= 1970 WAAA Championships =

British athletics event

- Dates: 19–20 June
- Host city: London
- Venue: Crystal Palace National Sports Centre
- Level: Senior
- Type: Outdoor

The 1970 WAAA Championships were the national track and field championships for women in the United Kingdom.

The event was held at the Crystal Palace National Sports Centre, London, from 19 to 20 June 1970.

== Results ==
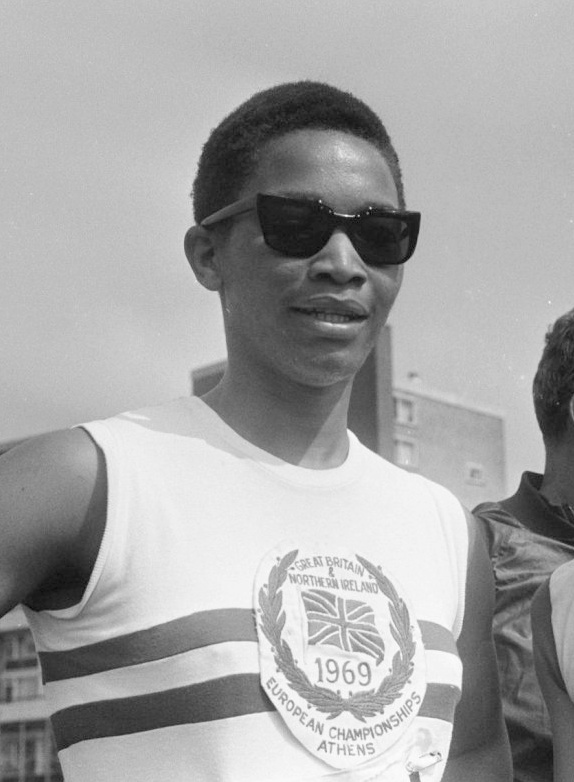
Marilyn Neufville

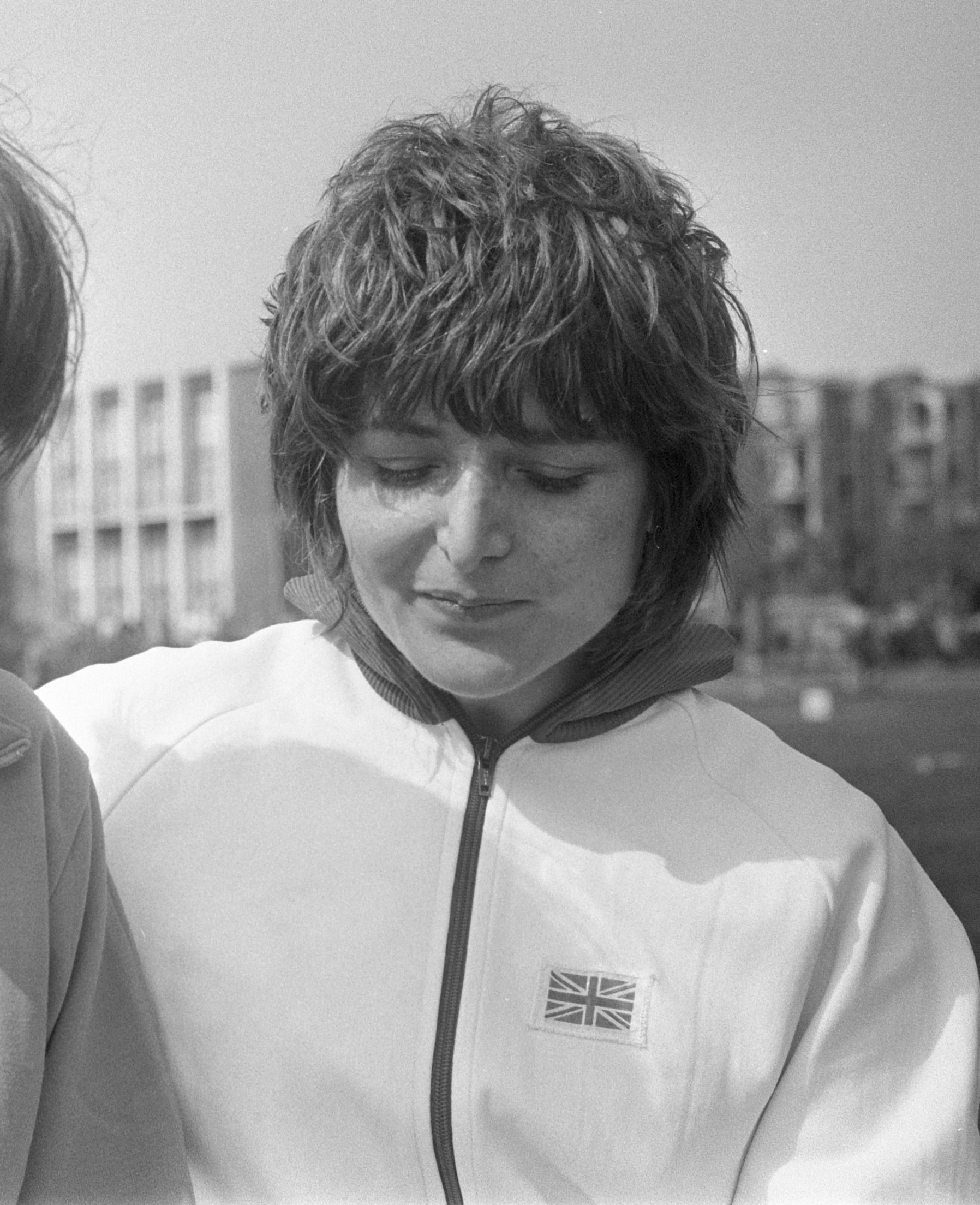
Sheila Carey

Event	Gold		Silver		Bronze	
100 metres	Anita Neil	11.6	(West Germany) Ingrid Becker	11.6	(Scotland) Helen Golden	11.6
200 metres	Margaret Critchley	23.8	Maureen Tranter	24.1	Della James	24.1
400 metres	Marilyn Neufville	52.6	(West Germany) Christel Frese	54.3	(West Germany) Inge Eckhoff	54.5
800 metres	Sheila Carey	2:03.6	(Republic of Ireland) Claire Walsh	2:04.9	Lillian Board	2:05.1
1500 metres	Rita Ridley	4:15.4 NR	(West Germany) Christa Merten	4:16.0	Norine Braithwaite	4:16.8
3000 metres	(Republic of Ireland) Ann O'Brien	9:34.4	Bridget Cushen	9:49.8	Barbara Banks	9:56.0
100 metres hurdles	Mary Peters	14.0	Christine Bell	14.2	Sue Scott	14.2
200 metres hurdles	Christine Bell	27.4	Sheila Garnett	27.8	Linda Robinson	27.9
High jump	Dorothy Shirley	1.68	(West Germany) Helga Letzelter	1.68	(Scotland) Moira Walls	1.68
Long jump	(West Germany) Ingrid Becker	6.50	Ann Wilson	6.32	Sheila Sherwood	6.30
Shot put	Mary Peters	14.85	(West Germany) Sigrun Kofink	14.77	Brenda Bedford	14.02
Discus throw	(Scotland) Rosemary Payne	52.58	(West Germany) Sigrun Kofink	48.58	(West Germany) Ilse Spiess	46.72
Javelin	(West Germany) Ameli Koloska	54.14	Angela King	46.68	Anne Farquhar	46.18
Pentathlon +	(Northern Ireland) Mary Peters	4841	Janet Oldall	4410	Shirley Clelland	4332
2500 metres walk	Judy Farr	12:34.0	Betty Jenkins	13:04.0	Margaret Lewis	13:09.2

+ Held on 26 & 27 June at Crystal Palace

== See also ==
- 1970 AAA Championships
