= 1968 WAAA Championships =

British athletics event

- Dates: 19–20 July
- Host city: London
- Venue: Crystal Palace National Sports Centre
- Level: Senior
- Type: Outdoor

The 1968 WAAA Championships were the national track and field championships for women in the United Kingdom.

The event was held at the Crystal Palace National Sports Centre, London, from 19 to 20 July 1968. The 3,000 metres event was held for the first time at the Championships.

It was the first time that the Championships were held at the Crystal Palace National Sports Centre.

== Results ==
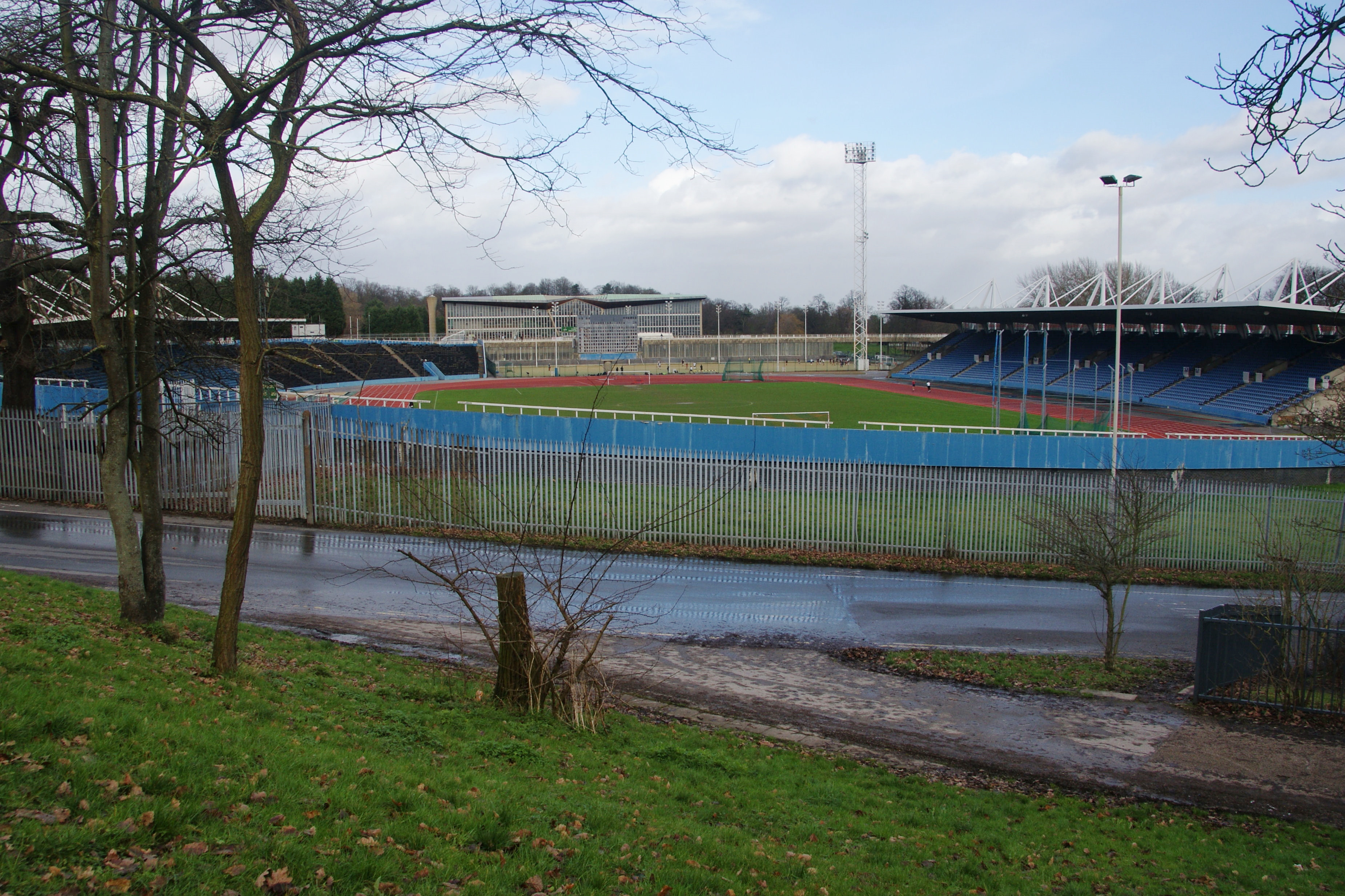
The WAAA Championships were held at Crystal Palace for the first time

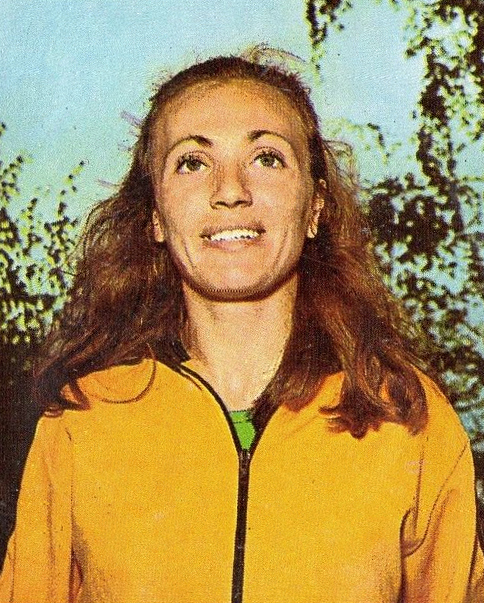
Vera Nikolić broke the world record in the 800 metres

Event	Gold		Silver		Bronze	
100 metres	Val Peat	11.5	Anita Neil	11.5	Della James	11.7
200 metres	Val Peat	23.6	Maureen Tranter	23.8	Della James	24.0
400 metres	(Netherlands) Mirna van der Hoeven	53.6	Janet Simpson	53.9	Mary Green	54.3
800 metres	(Socialist Federal Republic of Yugoslavia) Vera Nikolić	2:00.5 WR	Lillian Board	2:02.0	(United States) Doris Brown	2:02.2
1500 metres	Rita Lincoln	4:25.3	(Republic of Ireland) Ann O'Brien	4:29.7	Carol Firth	4:30.6
3000 metres	Carol Firth	10:06.4 NR	Pam Davies	10:19.2	Gabrielle Carpenter	10:28.6
80 metres hurdles	Pat Pryce	10.9	(Poland) Teresa Sukniewicz	10.9	(Italy) Carla Panerai	11.0
100 metres hurdles	Christine Perera	13.5 NR	Susan Hayward	14.2	(Scotland) Liz Toulalan	14.3
200 metres hurdles	Christine Perera	27.8	Sheila Garnett	28.0	Susan Hayward	29.0
High jump	Dorothy Shirley	1.715 jo	Barbara Inkpen	1.676	Leonie Esdaile	1.676
Long jump	Sheila Sherwood	6.42	Maureen Barton	6.25	Ann Wilson	6.22
Shot put	(East Germany) Margitta Gummel	16.99	(Netherlands) Els van Noorduyn	15.87	Brenda Bedford	14.71
Discus throw	(East Germany) Karin Illgen	57.22	(East Germany) Christine Spielberg	56.64	(Netherlands) Anneke de Bruin	50.52
Javelin	Sue Platt	53.26	Anne Farquhar	47.80	Pru French	44.86
Pentathlon +	(Northern Ireland) Mary Peters	4723	Sue Scott	4622	Susan Hayward	4326
1½ mile walk	Judy Farr	12:39.0	Betty Jenkins	12:44.2	Barbara Fisk	12:54.6

+ Held from 9 to 10 July at Crystal Palace

== See also ==
- 1968 AAA Championships
