= 1972 WAAA Championships =

British athletics event

- Dates: 7–8 July
- Host city: London
- Venue: Crystal Palace National Sports Centre
- Level: Senior
- Type: Outdoor

The 1972 WAAA Championships were the national track and field championships for women in the United Kingdom.

The event was held at the Crystal Palace National Sports Centre, London, from 7 to 8 July 1972.

== Results ==
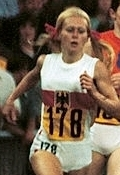
Ellen Tittel

Event	Gold		Silver		Bronze	
100 metres	Della Pascoe	11.86	Sonia Lannaman	11.88	Andrea Lynch	11.97
200 metres	Donna Murray	23.98	Della Pascoe	24.28	Judy Vernon	24.28
400 metres	Verona Bernard	53.20	Maureen Tranter	54.06	(Netherlands) Hilda Kooy	54.34
800 metres	(Republic of Ireland) Mary Tracey	2:02.98	Pat Cropper	2:03.68	Margaret Coomber	2:04.06
1500 metres	(West Germany) Ellen Tittel	4:17.15	Joyce Smith	4:17.60	(Netherlands) Ilja Keizer	4:17.68
3000 metres	Paula Yeoman	9:30.70	(Scotland) Ann Barrass	9:34.34	(Scotland) Wanda Sosinka	9:37.42
100 metres hurdles	(Australia) Pam Ryan	13.48	Judy Vernon	13.86	Pat Pryce	14.00
200 metres hurdles	(Australia) Pam Ryan	26.82	(Nigeria) Nnenna Njoku	29.26	Julie Wood	29.87
High jump	Ros Few	1.74	(Northern Ireland) Mary Peters	1.74	Barbara Inkpen	1.74
Long jump	Sheila Sherwood	6.37	Maureen Chitty	6.29	(Wales) Ruth Martin-Jones	6.27
Shot put	(Australia) Jean Roberts	15.34	Brenda Bedford	14.72	(Scotland) Heather Stuart	14.20
Discus throw	(Scotland) Rosemary Payne	53.78	(Australia) Jean Roberts	51.66	Brenda Bedford	45.84
Javelin	Pru French	51.00	Angela King	46.54	Sharon Corbett	45.28
Pentathlon +	Ann Wilson	4292	(Wales) Ruth Martin-Jones	4206	Janet Honour	4005
2500 metres walk	Betty Jenkins	12:31.2	Brenda Cook	12:49.0	Virginia Lovell	12:58.8

+ Held on 1 July at Birmingham University

== See also ==
- 1972 AAA Championships
