= 1969 WAAA Championships =

British athletics event

- Dates: 18–19 July
- Host city: London
- Venue: Crystal Palace National Sports Centre
- Level: Senior
- Type: Outdoor

The 1969 WAAA Championships were the national track and field championships for women in the United Kingdom.

The event was held at the Crystal Palace National Sports Centre, London, from 18 to 19 July 1969. The 80 metres hurdles was discontinued.

== Results ==
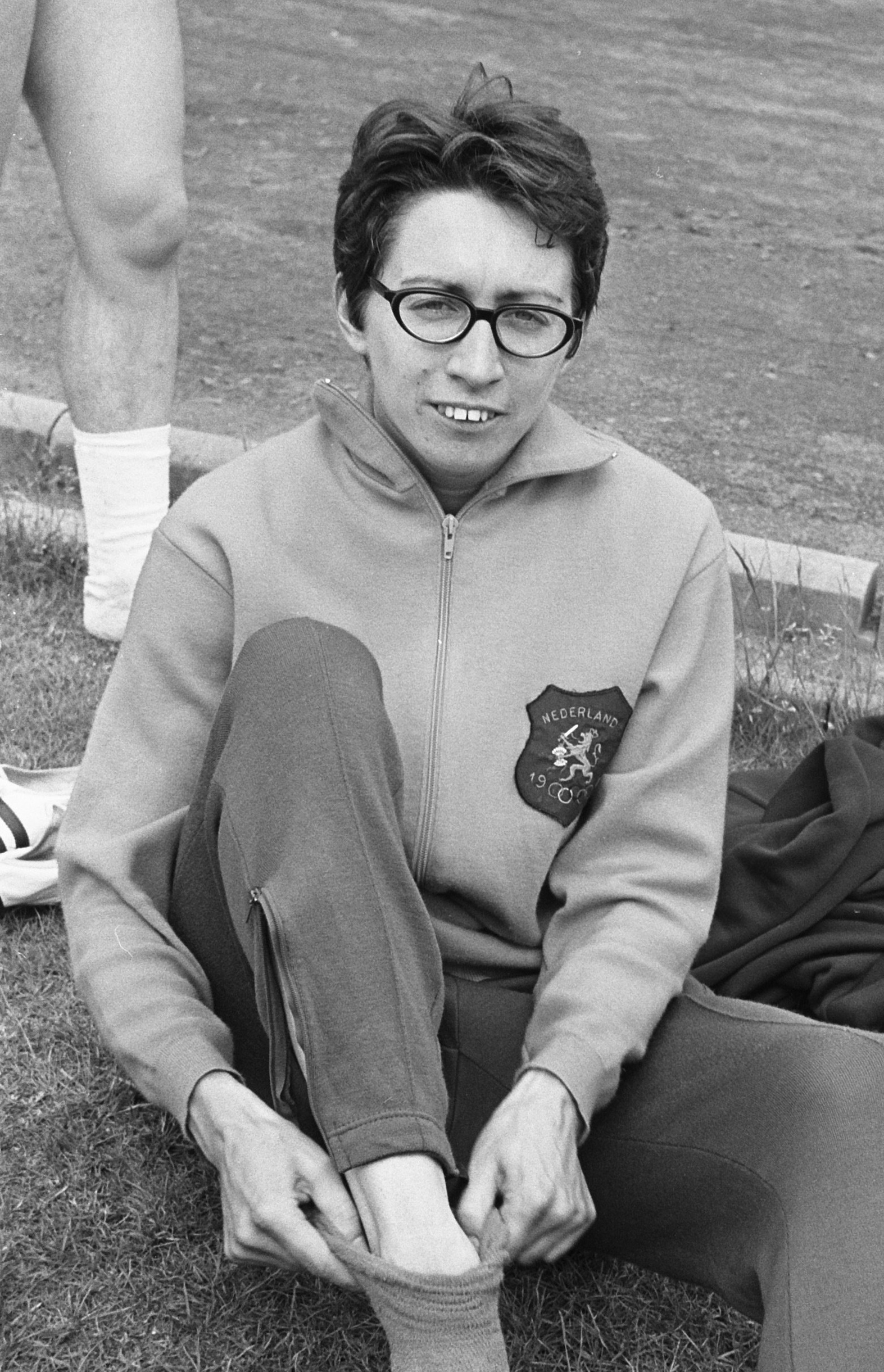
Mia Gommers winner of the 1500 metres

Event	Gold		Silver		Bronze	
100 metres	(Chinese Taipei) Chi Cheng	11.87	Dorothy Hyman	11.92	Anita Neil	12.10
200 metres	Dorothy Hyman	23.7	Marilyn Neufville	24.3	Val Peat	24.3
400 metres	Jennifer Pawsey	54.3	Pauline Attwood	55.2	(Scotland) Barbara Lyall	54.6
800 metres	Pat Lowe	2:03.3	(Netherlands) Ilja Keizer	2:03.5	(Socialist Federal Republic of Yugoslavia) Vera Nikolić	2:04.2
1500 metres	(Netherlands) Maria Gommers	4:16.0	Rita Ridley	4:25.4	(Wales) Thelwyn Bateman	4:26.1
3000 metres	(Republic of Ireland) Ann O'Brien	9:47.6	Barbara Banks	9:54.4	Madeleine Ibbotson	10:10.8
100 metres hurdles	(Chinese Taipei) Chi Cheng	13.52	(Poland) Teresa Nowak	13.8	(Poland) Teresa Sukniewicz	14.0
200 metres hurdles	Susan Hayward	28.5	Linda Robinson	28.5	Angela D'Arcy	29.3
High jump	Barbara Inkpen	1.72	Dorothy Shirley	1.72	Frances Slaap	1.70
Long jump	Sheila Sherwood	6.23	Anita Neil	6.20	Barbara-Anne Barrett	5.87
Shot put	Brenda Bedford	15.22	(Romania) Lia Manoliu	14.30	Gay Porter	13.01
Discus throw	(Romania) Lia Manoliu	55.58	(Scotland) Rosemary Payne	49.58	(Netherlands) Anneke de Bruin	48.50
Javelin	Sue Platt	49.34	Shara Spragg	48.58	Averil Williams	46.82
Pentathlon +	(Scotland) Moira Walls	459	Shirley Clelland	4279	Barbara Corbett	4222
2500 metres walk	Judy Farr	12:45.8	Betty Jenkins	12:53.4	Barbara Fisk	13:02.4

+ Held on 2 August at Birmingham University

== See also ==
- 1969 AAA Championships
