= 1967 European Cup (athletics) =

- Host city: Kiev, Soviet Union
- Level: Senior
- Type: Outdoor
- Events: 31

The 1967 European Cup was the 2nd edition of the international team competition in athletics between European nations, organised by the European Athletic Association.

The tournament consisted of three sections. Three preliminary competitions were held for men's teams of smaller nations on 24–25 June, held in Copenhagen, Athens and Dublin. Netherlands, Switzerland and Belgium progressed to the next round as winners. Three semi-finals were conducted for both men's and women's teams, with the men's held on 22–23 July in Ostrava, Duisburg and Stockholm, and the women's was held on 16 July Dresden, Oslo and Wuppertal . The top two teams in each semi-final qualified for the Finals held in Kiev, Soviet Union.

== Final ==
Held in Kiev on 15 September (women) and on 16–17 September (men).

=== Team standings ===
Men
Pos.	Nation	Points
1	Soviet Union	81
2	East Germany	80
3	West Germany	79
4	Poland	68
5	France	57
6	Hungary	53

Women
Pos.	Nation	Points
1	Soviet Union	51
2	East Germany	43
3	West Germany	36
4	Poland	35
5	Great Britain	34
6	Hungary	32

=== Results summary ===
==== Men's events ====
Event	Gold		Silver		Bronze	
100 m (Wind: +1.3 m/s)	Vladislav Sapeya; Soviet Union	10.3	Harmut Wilke; West Germany	10.4	Harald Eggers; East Germany	10.5
200 m	Jean-Claude Nallet; France	20.9	Jan Werner; Poland	20.9	László Mihályfi; Hungary	21.1
400 m	Jean-Claude Nallet; France	46.3	Fritz Roderfeld; West Germany	46.4	Andrzej Badeński; Poland	46.8
800 m	Manfred Matuschewski; East Germany	1:46.9	Franz-Josef Kemper; West Germany	1:46.9	Jean-Pierre Dufresne; France	1:48.2
1500 m	Manfred Matuschewski; East Germany	3:40.2	Bodo Tümmler; West Germany	3:40.5	Oleg Rayko; Soviet Union	3:41.2
5000 m	Harald Norpoth; West Germany	15:26.8	Jürgen Haase; East Germany	15:27.8	György Kiss; Hungary	15:29.2
10,000 m	Jürgen Haase; East Germany	28:54.2	Lajos Mecser; Hungary	28:55.6	Anatoliy Makarov; Soviet Union	28:58.6
3000 m steeplechase	Anatoliy Kuryan; Soviet Union	8:38.8	Manfred Letzerich; West Germany	8:39.6	Guy Texereau; France	8:41.2
110 m hurdles	Viktor Balikhin; Soviet Union	14.0	Adam Kołodziejczyk; Poland	14.2	Pierre Schoebel; France	14.2
400 m hurdles	Gerhard Hennige; West Germany	50.2	Wilhelm Weistand; Poland	50.5	Joachim Singer; East Germany	50.8
4 × 100 m	France; Marc Berger; Jocelyn Delecour; Claude Piquemal; Gérard Fenouil	39.2	West Germany; Jobst Hirscht; Gert Metz; Hartmut Wilk; Horst Assion	39.3 NR	East Germany; Heinz Erbstosser; Peter Haase; Hermann Burde; Harald Eggers	39.4
4 × 400 m	Poland; Stanisław Grędziński; Edmund Borowski; Jan Werner; Andrzej Badeński	3:04.4	West Germany; Helmar Müller; Ingo Roper; Jens Ulbricht; Fritz Roderfeld	3:04.5	East Germany; Wolfgang Müller; Michael Zerbes; Günter Klann; Wilfried Weiland	3:05.8
High jump	Valentin Gavrilov; Soviet Union	2.09	Wolfgang Schillkowski; West Germany	2.07	Sándor Noszály; Hungary	2.07
Pole vault	Wolfgang Nordwig; East Germany	5.10	Hennadiy Bleznitsov; Soviet Union	5.05	Klaus Lehnertz; West Germany	4.90
Long jump	Igor Ter-Ovanesyan; Soviet Union	8.14w	Andrzej Stalmach; Poland	7.88w	Josef Schwarz; West Germany	7.85w
Triple jump	Viktor Sanyeyev; Soviet Union	16.67	Hans-Jürgen Rückborn; East Germany	16.49	Józef Schmidt; Poland	16.29
Shot put	Vilmos Varjú; Hungary	19.25	Heinfried Birlenbach; West Germany	19.20	Dieter Prollius; East Germany	18.82
Discus throw	Edmund Piątkowski; Poland	59.10	Detlef Thorith; East Germany	57.86	Vitautas Jaras; Russia	56.60
Hammer throw	Romuald Klim; Soviet Union	70.58	Gyula Zsivótzky; Hungary	68.12	Uwe Beyer; West Germany	66.80
Javelin throw	Jānis Lūsis; Soviet Union	85.38	Manfred Stolle; East Germany	81.14	Gergely Kulcsár; Hungary	79.46
WR world record | AR area record | CR championship record | GR games record | NR national record | OR Olympic record | PB personal best | SB season best | WL world leading (in a given season)

==== Women's events ====
Event	Gold		Silver		Bronze	
100 m (Wind: +0.5 m/s)	Irena Kirszenstein; Poland	11.2	Renate Heldt; East Germany	11.5	Margit Nemesházi; Hungary	11.6
200 m (Wind: +0.5 m/s)	Irena Kirszenstein; Poland	23.0	Annamária Tóth; Hungary	23.4	Vera Popkova; Soviet Union	23.4
400 m	Lillian Board; Great Britain	53.7	Antónia Munkácsi; Hungary	54.1	Lyudmila Samotyosova; Soviet Union	54.3
800 m	Laine Erik; Soviet Union	2:06.8	Danuta Sobieska; Poland	2:07.0	Anita Rottmüller; West Germany	2:07.2
80 m hurdles (Wind: +0.8 m/s)	Karin Balzer; East Germany	10.8	Pat Jones; Great Britain	10.9	Inge Schell; West Germany	11.0
4 × 100 m	Soviet Union; Galina Bukharina; Liliya Tkachenko; Vera Popkova; Lyudmila Samotyosova	45.0	Great Britain; Anita Neil; Maureen Tranter; Jenny Pawsey; Della James	45.3	East Germany; Ingrid Tiedtke; Angela Vogel; Christina Heinich; Renate Heldt	45.3
High jump	Antonina Okorokova; Soviet Union	1.79	Rita Schmidt; East Germany	1.70	Dorothy Shirley; Great Britain	1.67
Long jump	Ingrid Becker; West Germany	6.63	Tatyana Talysheva; Soviet Union	6.49	Mary Rand; Great Britain	6.26
Shot put	Nadezhda Chizhova; Soviet Union	18.24	Margitta Gummel; East Germany	17.66	Judit Bognár; Hungary	16.58
Discus throw	Karin Illgen; East Germany	58.26	Lyudmila Muravyova; Soviet Union	56.70	Jolán Kleiber; Hungary	56.70
Javelin throw	Daniela Jaworska; Poland	56.88	Ameli Koloska; West Germany	54.22	Ruth Fuchs; East Germany	53.18
WR world record | AR area record | CR championship record | GR games record | NR national record | OR Olympic record | PB personal best | SB season best | WL world leading (in a given season)

== Semifinals ==
=== Men ===
All semifinals were held on 22 and 23 July.

Semifinal 1
Held in Ostrava

Pos.	Nation	Points
1	Poland	94
2	France	93
3	Czechoslovakia	79
4	Italy	71
5	Romania	51
6	Netherlands	31

Semifinal 2
Held in Duisburg

Pos.	Nation	Points
1	West Germany	105
2	Hungary	78
3	Great Britain	77
4	Switzerland	56
5	Bulgaria	54
6	Yugoslavia	37

Semifinal 3
Held in Stockholm

Pos.	Nation	Points
1	Soviet Union	105
2	East Germany	87
3	Sweden	69
4	Norway	55
5	Belgium	53
6	Finland	51

=== Women ===
All semifinals were held on 16 July.

Semifinal 1
Held in Dresden

Pos.	Nation	Points
1	East Germany	45
2	Hungary	39
3	Netherlands	36
4	Bulgaria	29
5	Italy	15

Semifinal 2
Held in Wuppertal

Pos.	Nation	Points
1	Poland	55
2	West Germany	54
3	Czechoslovakia	38
4	France	37
5	Yugoslavia	25
6	Austria	22

Semifinal 3
Held in Oslo

Pos.	Nation	Points
1	Soviet Union	55
2	Great Britain	47
3	Sweden	42
4	Romania	42
5	Norway	23
6	Denmark	21

== Preliminaries ==
=== Men ===
All preliminaries were held on 24–25 June.

Preliminary 1
Held in Copenhagen

Pos.	Nation	Points
1	Netherlands	59
2	Denmark	56
3	Austria	53
4	Turkey	31

Preliminary 2
Held in Athens

Pos.	Nation	Points
1	Switzerland	65
2	Spain	54
3	Greece	48
4	Portugal	33

Preliminary 3
Held in Dublin

Pos.	Nation	Points
1	Belgium	115
2	Ireland	98.5
3	Iceland	86.5
