= 1971 WAAA Championships =

British athletics event

- Dates: 16–17 July
- Host city: London
- Venue: Crystal Palace National Sports Centre
- Level: Senior
- Type: Outdoor

The 1971 WAAA Championships were the national track and field championships for women in the United Kingdom.

The event was held at the Crystal Palace National Sports Centre, London, from 16 to 17 July 1971.

== Results ==
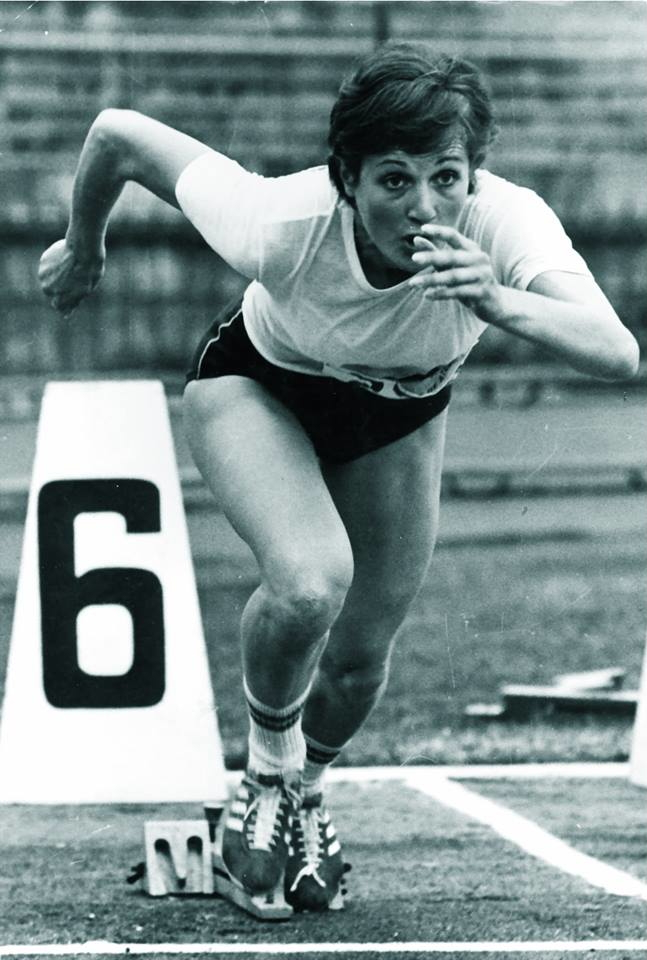
Valeria Bufanu

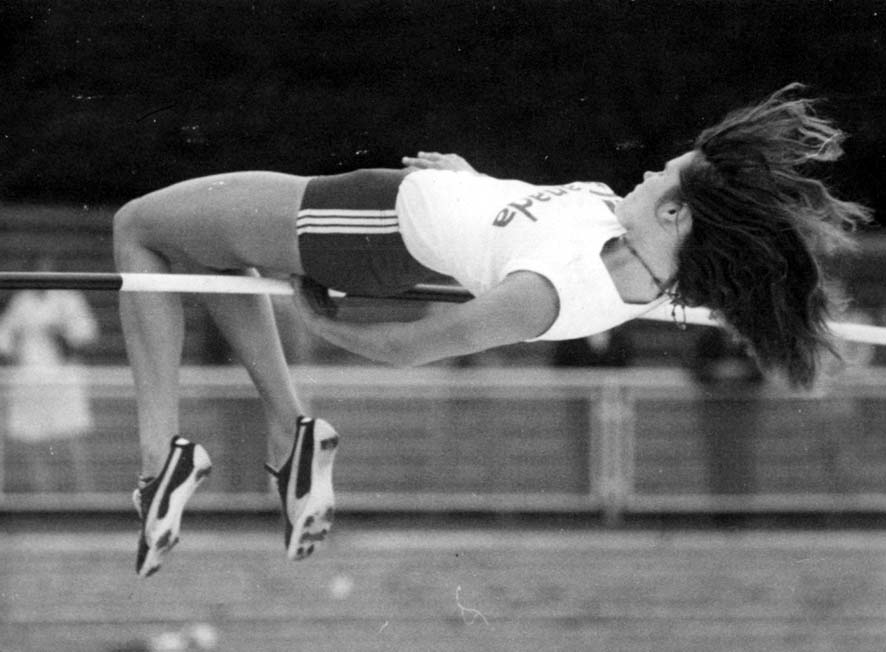
Debbie Brill

Event	Gold		Silver		Bronze	
100 metres	(Canada) Stephanie Berto	11.42	Anita Neil	11.51	Liz Johns	11.58
200 metres	(Canada) Stephanie Berto	23.54	Margaret Critchley	23.78	(Canada) Patty Loverock	23.84
400 metres	Jannette Roscoe	53.93	(Canada) Brenda Walsh	54.00	Verona Bernard	54.30
800 metres	(Canada) Abby Hoffman	2:04.04	Rosemary Stirling	2:04.30	Pat Lowe	2:05.22
1500 metres	Rita Ridley	4:14.32 NR	Joan Allison	4:16.42	Sheila Carey	4:16.93
3000 metres	Joyce Smith	9:23.40 WR	Bronwen Cardy	9:40.83	(Scotland) Ann Barrass	9:48.80
100 metres hurdles	(Romania) Valeria Bufanu	13.52	Sheila Garnett	13.91	(Canada) Penny May	14.02
200 metres hurdles	Sharon Colyear	26.68	Judy Vernon	27.06	Sheila Garnett	27.59
High jump	(Canada) Debbie Brill	1.83	(Canada) Debbie Van Kiekebelt	1.80	(Norway) Kari Karlsen	1.80
Long jump	Sheila Sherwood	6.52	Barbara-Anne Barrett	6.40	(Canada) Brenda Eisler	6.25
Shot put	(Australia) Jean Roberts	15.81	Brenda Bedford	14.93	(Scotland) Heather Stuart	13.87
Discus throw	(West Germany) Liesel Westermann	58.44	(Australia) Jean Roberts	52.76	(Scotland) Rosemary Payne	52.60
Javelin	(Norway) Inger Fallo	47.68	Janet Baker	46.18	Sharon Corbett	45.34
Pentathlon +	Janet Honour	4571	Judy Vernon	4544	(Nigeria) Nnenna Njoku	4297
2500 metres walk	Brenda Cook	12:39.8	Margaret Lewis	12:55.4	Maureen Graham	13:23.0

+ Held on 3 July at Birmingham University

== See also ==
- 1971 AAA Championships
