= 1973 WAAA Championships =

British athletics event

- Dates: 20–21 July
- Host city: London
- Venue: Crystal Palace National Sports Centre
- Level: Senior
- Type: Outdoor

The 1973 WAAA Championships were the national track and field championships for women in the United Kingdom.

The event was held at the Crystal Palace National Sports Centre, London, from 20 to 21 July 1973.

The 200 metres hurdles was replaced with the 400 metres hurdles and the 2,500 metres walk was replaced with the 3,000 metres walk.

== Results ==
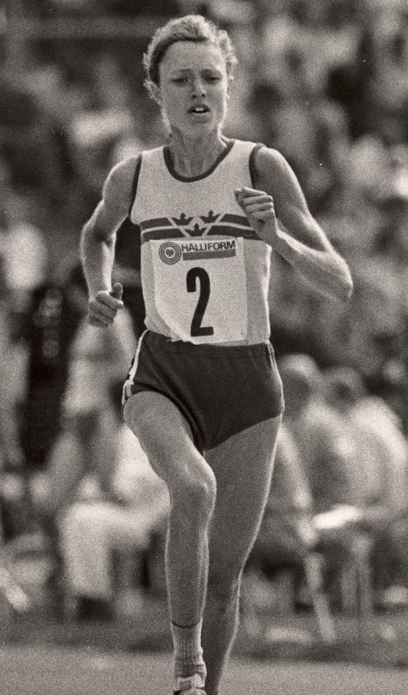
Inger Knutsson

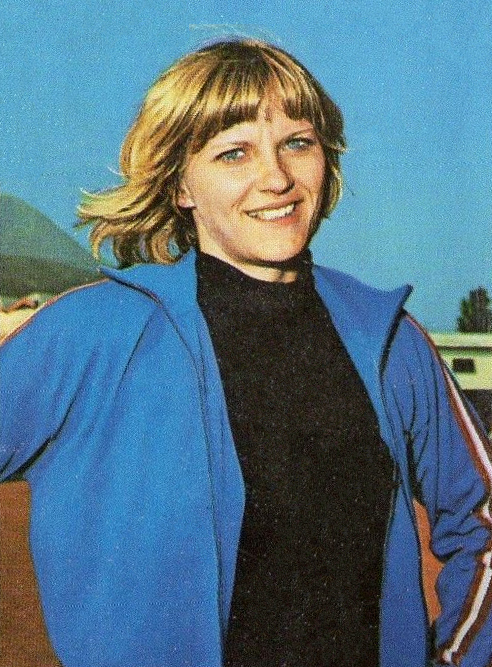
Ilona Gusenbauer

Event	Gold		Silver		Bronze	
100 metres	Andrea Lynch	11.74	(Scotland) Helen Golden	12.09	Barbara Martin	12.19
200 metres	(Scotland) Helen Golden	24.26	(Scotland) Alison MacRitchie	24.62	Barbara Martin	24.68
400 metres	Jannette Roscoe	53.78	(Republic of Ireland) Claire Walsh	54.26	(Republic of Ireland) Aideen Morrison	54.47
800 metres	(Republic of Ireland) Mary Tracey	2:03.31	(New Zealand) Sue Haden	2:03.71	(Scotland) Rosemary Wright	2:05.05
1500 metres+	Joan Allison	4:15.82	Norine Braithwaite	4:19.09	Rita Ridley	4:19.82
3000 metres	(Sweden) Inger Knutsson	9:08.04	Joyce Smith	9:11.45	Ann Yeoman	9:29.16
100 metres hurdles	Judy Vernon	14.03	(Northern Ireland) Mary Peters	14.40	Lorna Drysdale	14.50
400 metres hurdles	Sue Howell	61.41	Janice Farry	63.48	Christine Taylor	65.03
High jump	(Austria) Ilona Gusenbauer	1.85	Barbara Lawton	1.82	Val Harrison	1.76
Long jump	(Scotland) Myra Nimmo	6.33	Maureen Chitty	6.31	(Norway) Berit Berthelsen	6.16
Shot put	Brenda Bedford	14.82	(Northern Ireland) Mary Peters	14.49	Janis Kerr	14.02
Discus throw	(Scotland) Rosemary Payne	56.40	(Scotland) Meg Ritchie	50.54	(Sweden) Ulla Buuts	48.14
Javelin	Sharon Corbett	53.88	Jean Randall	48.10	Anne Goodlad	47.50
Pentathlon ++	(Northern Ireland) Mary Peters	4429	Gladys Taylor	3876	Janet Honour	3837
3000 metres walk	Betty Jenkins	14:59.4	Marion Fawkes	15:04.6	Christine Coleman	15:10.0

- +Grete Andersen finished 2nd in the 1500 metres in a time of 4:19.04, but was disqualified
- ++Pentahlon held on 27 May at Warley

== See also ==
- 1973 AAA Championships
