= 1967 WAAA Championships =

British athletics event

- Dates: 30 June – 1 July
- Host city: London
- Venue: White City Stadium
- Level: Senior
- Type: Outdoor

The 1967 WAAA Championships were the national track and field championships for women in the United Kingdom.

The event was held at White City Stadium, London, from 30 June to 1 July 1967.

It was the last time the Championships were held at White City. The 100 metres hurdles height was increased to 2'9".

== Results ==
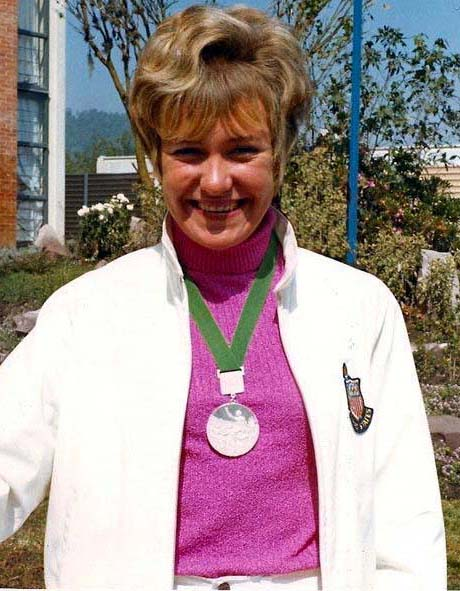
Lillian Board

Event	Gold		Silver		Bronze	
100 yards	(South Africa) Johanna Cornelissen	10.5	(Netherlands) Wilma van den Berg	10.6	Della James	10.7
220 yards	(South Africa) Johanna Cornelissen	24.0	Maureen Tranter	24.1	Sheena Willshire	24.1
440 yards	Lillian Board	55.3	Mary Green	55.3	(Scotland) Rosemary Stirling	55.7
880 yards	Anne Smith	2:04.8	(South Africa) Anne McKenzie	2:07.4	Pam Piercy	2:07.4
1 mile	Rita Lincoln	4:51.4	Joy Jordan	4:55.4	Gabrielle Carpenter	4:57.9
80 metres hurdles	Pat Jones	11.0	(South Africa) Eugene Bräsler	11.0	(East Germany) Regina Höfer	11.1
100 metres hurdles	Pat Jones	13.8	Eileen Dawson	14.3	Sheila Garnett	14.3
200 metres hurdles	Pat Jones	27.3 WR	Sandra Dyson	27.6	Christine Perera	28.0
High jump	Linda Knowles	1.702	Dorothy Shirley	1.676	Gwenda Hurst	1.651
Long jump	(Norway) Berit Berthelsen	6.47	Ann Wilson	6.13	(East Germany) Burghild Wieczorek	6.11
Shot put	Brenda Bedford	15.18	(Netherlands) Els van Noorduyn	14.93	(Northern Ireland) Mary Peters	13.66
Discus throw	(Scotland) Rosemary Payne	46.66	Jo Frampton	44.36	Brenda Bedford	44.04
Javelin	Sue Platt	49.16	Rosemary Morgan	46.92	(South Africa) Teresa Louw	41.60
Pentathlon +	Janet Oldall	3965	(Scotland) Linda Carruthers	3944	Pat Whitehead	3855
1½ mile walk	Judy Farr	12:09.2	Betty Jenkins	12:40.2	Sheila Jennings	12:56.8

+ Held on 10 June at Solihull

== See also ==
- 1967 AAA Championships
