= 1966 WAAA Championships =

British athletics event

- Dates: 1–2 July
- Host city: London
- Venue: White City Stadium
- Level: Senior
- Type: Outdoor

The 1966 WAAA Championships were the national track and field championships for women in the United Kingdom.

The event was held at White City Stadium, London, from 1 to 2 July 1966.

== Results ==
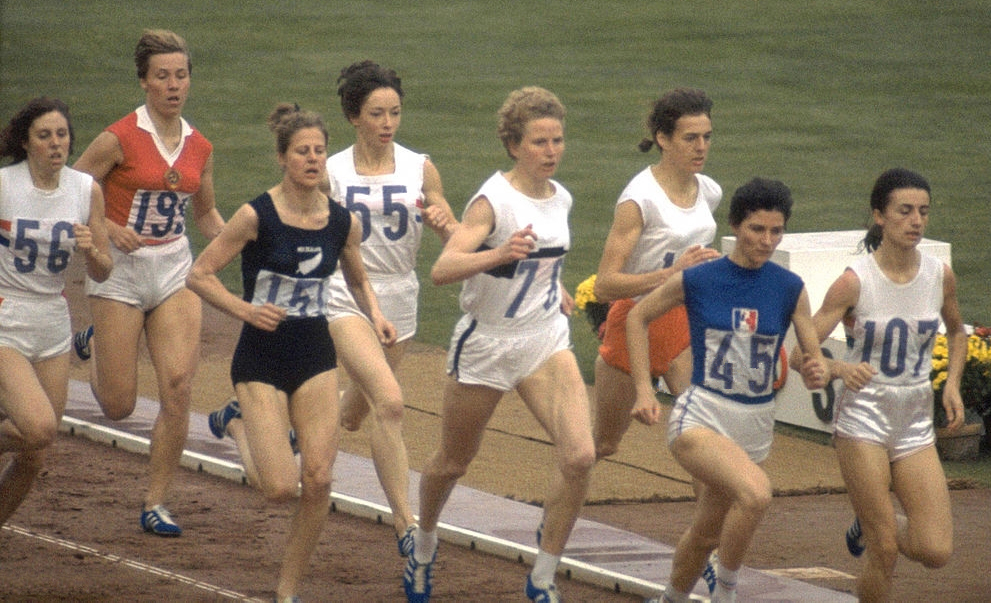
Anne Smith (no 56, pictured at the Olympics in 1964) won the 880 yards WAAA title

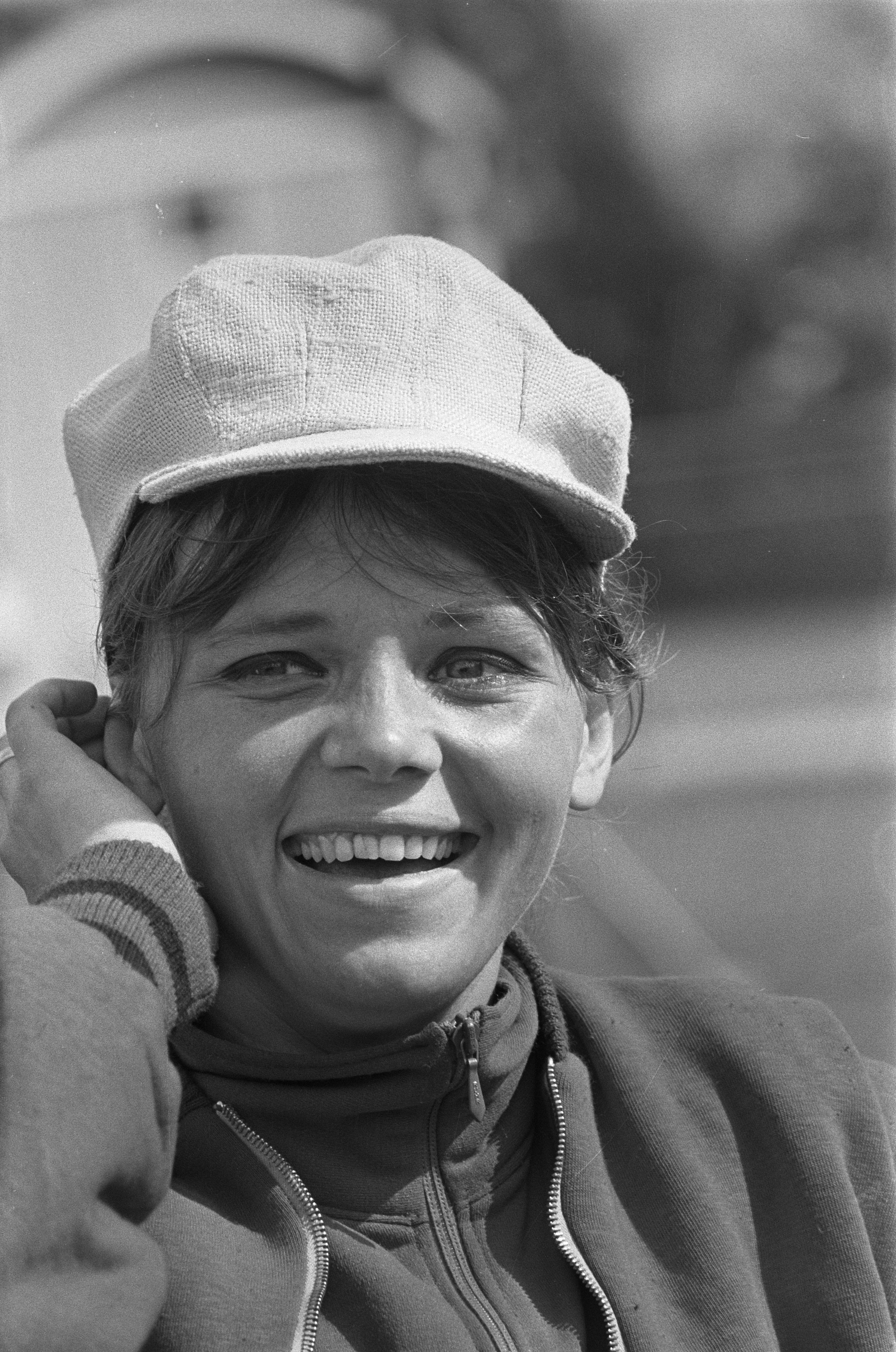
Hilde Slaman won the 440 yards

Event	Gold		Silver		Bronze	
100 yards	Daphne Slater	10.5	Jill Hall	10.5	Maureen Tranter	10.6
220 yards	Janet Simpson	24.1	Maureen Tranter	24.2	Daphne Slater	24.2
440 yards	(Netherlands) Hilde Slaman	54.7	Joy Grieveson	54.9	(Scotland) Rosemary Stirling	55.1
880 yards	Anne Smith	2:04.2 NR	(Netherlands) Ilja Laman	2:05.4	Pam Piercy	2:06.7
1 mile	Rita Lincoln	4:47.9	(Czechoslovakia) Marie Ingrová	4:48.8	Joyce Smith	4:55.2
80 metres hurdles	(Poland) Danuta Straszyńska	10.9	Pat Pryce	11.0	Maxine Botley	11.0
100 metres hurdles	Christine Perera	13.5 NR	Susan Mills	14.2	Liz Toulalan	14.3
200 metres hurdles	Pat Jones	27.7 NR	Susan Mills	28.8	Sandra Dyson	29.2
High jump	Dorothy Shirley	1.702	Frances Slaap	1.651	Mary Rand	1.651
Long jump	(Norway) Berit Berthelsen	6.30	Mary Rand	6.13	(Netherlands) Corrie Bakker	6.10
Shot put	Brenda Bedford	14.52	(Scotland) Moira Kerr	13.15	Kathryn Duckett	12.63
Discus throw	(Scotland) Rosemary Payne	49.88	Brenda Bedford	44.12	Gail Smith	41.78
Javelin	Sue Platt	45.18	Barbara Nicholls	44.40	Margaret Whitbread	44.20
Pentathlon +	(Northern Ireland) Mary Peters	4625	Gwenda Hurst	4151	(Scotland) Alix Jamieson	4070
1½ mile walk	Judy Farr	12:09.2	Sheila Jennings	12:16.8	Audrey Hackett	12:53.0

+ Held on 28 May at Birmingham University

== See also ==
- 1966 AAA Championships
