= Gwenda Matthews =

British athlete

Personal information
- Nationality: British (English)
- Born: 6 June 1944 (age 82) Uxbridge, London, England
- Height: 177 cm (5 ft 10 in)
- Weight: 63 kg (139 lb)

Sport
- Sport: Athletics
- Event: High jump
- Club: Ruislip & Northwood AC

Gwenda Mary Matthews married name Gwenda Hurst (born 6 June 1944) is a British retired athlete, who competed at the 1964 Summer Olympics.

== Biography ==
Matthews finished second behind Frances Slaap in the high jump event at the 1964 WAAA Championships.

Shortly afterwards at the 1964 Olympic Games in Tokyo, she represented Great Britain in the women's high jump competition.

Matthews was third behind Mary Peters in the Pentathlon at the 1965 WAAA Championships, shortly before she married David Hurst and Matthews competed under her married name thereafter.

Hurst improved to second place behind Mary Peters at the 1966 WAAA Championships and then one month later represented England in the high jump and long jump, at the 1966 British Empire and Commonwealth Games in Kingston, Jamaica.

Hurst finished third behind Linda Knowles at the 1967 WAAA Championships.
