= Norine Braithwaite =

British middle- and long-distance runner

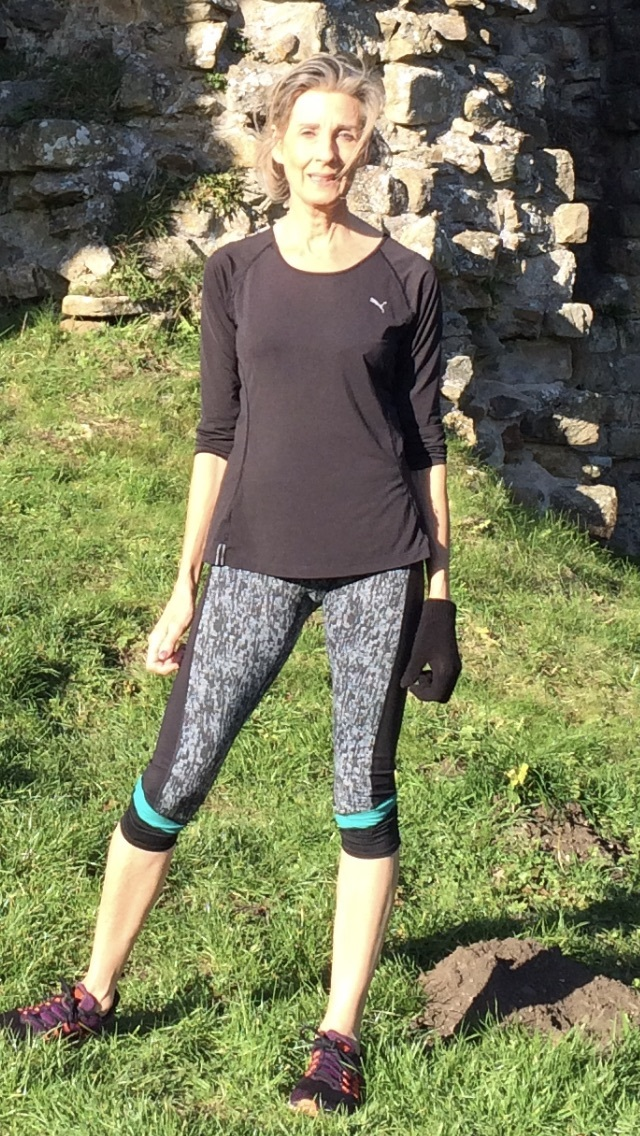
- Norine Braithwaite running at Hadrian's Wall 2022

Personal information
- Nationality: Athletics
- Born: 29 January 1951 (age 75) Preston, England

Sport
- Sport: Athletics

Norine Dorothy Braithwaite (born 29 January 1951), is a female former athlete who competed for England.

== Biography ==
Braithwaite attended Lancaster Girls' Grammar School, living in Scorton. Her father was Bob Braithwaite who received a medal in the 1968 Summer Olympics. At the University of Manchester she studied Spanish.

Braithwaite finished third behind Rita Ridley in the 1500 metres event at the 1970 WAAA Championships and one month later competed for England in the 800 and 1,500 metres, at the 1970 British Commonwealth Games in Edinburgh, Scotland.

Braithwaite finished second behind Joan Allison at the 1973 WAAA Championships and also represented England in the 1973 IAAF World Cross Country Championships in Waregem, where she won a gold medal in the team event.

The following year she represented England in the 1,500 metres at the 1974 British Commonwealth Games in Christchurch, New Zealand.
