= Athletics at the 1967 Summer Universiade – Women's high jump =

The women's high jump event at the 1967 Summer Universiade was held at the National Olympic Stadium in Tokyo on 1 September 1967.

== Results ==
Rank	Name	Nationality	Result	Notes
1st place, gold medalist(s)	Mami Takeda	Japan	1.68	
2nd place, silver medalist(s)	Linda Knowles	Great Britain	1.68	
3rd place, bronze medalist(s)	Liese Prokop	Austria	1.68	
4	Ilona Gusenbauer	Austria	1.65	
5	Susan Dennler	Great Britain	1.65	
6	Kimie Tanaka	Japan	1.65	
7	Liliane de Loynes de Fumichon	France	1.55	
