= 1965 WAAA Championships =

British athletics event

- Dates: 3 July
- Host city: London
- Venue: White City Stadium
- Level: Senior
- Type: Outdoor

The 1965 WAAA Championships were the national track and field championships for women in the United Kingdom.

The event was held at White City Stadium, London, on 3 July 1965.

== Results ==
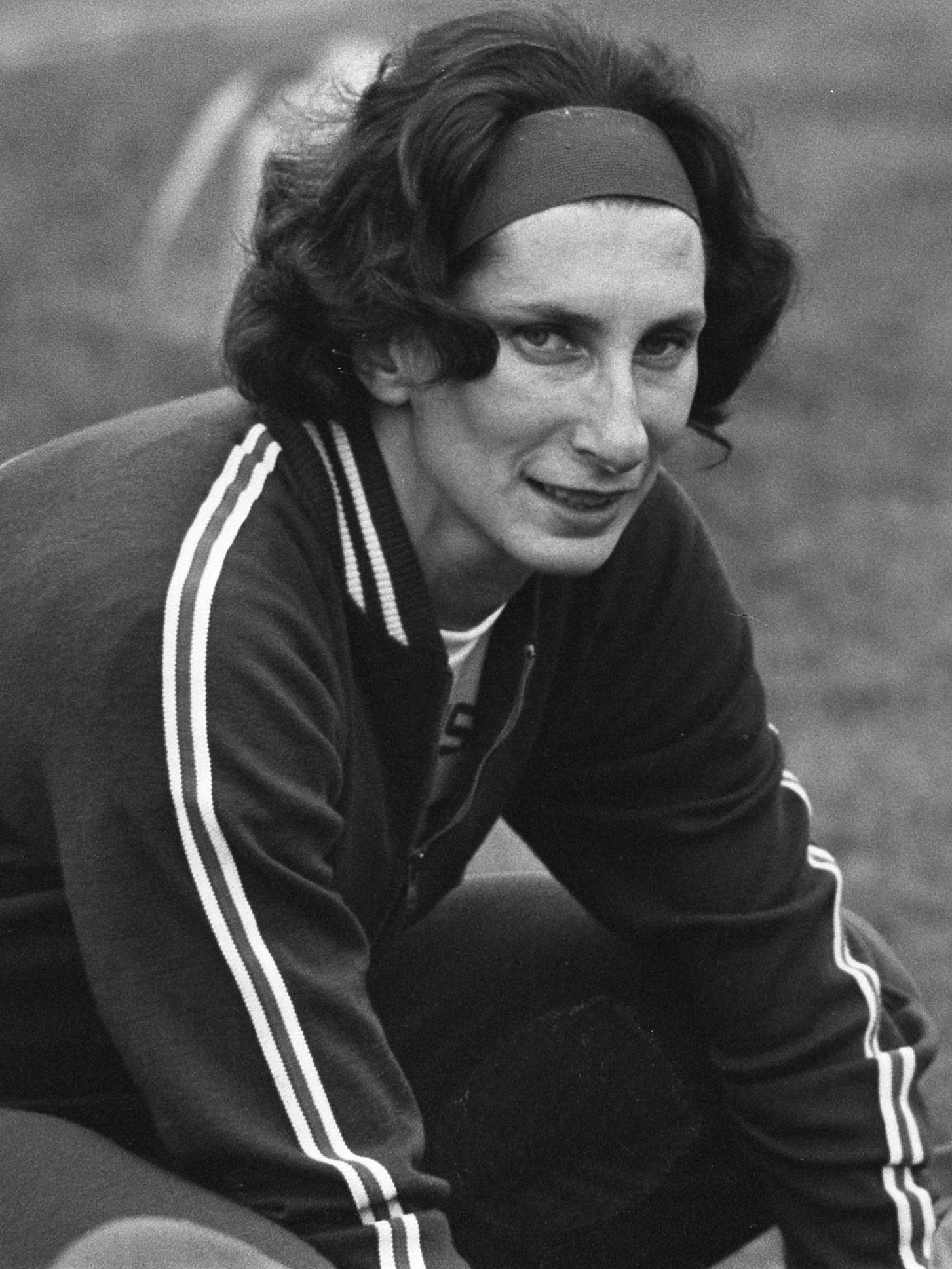
Irena Kirszenstein

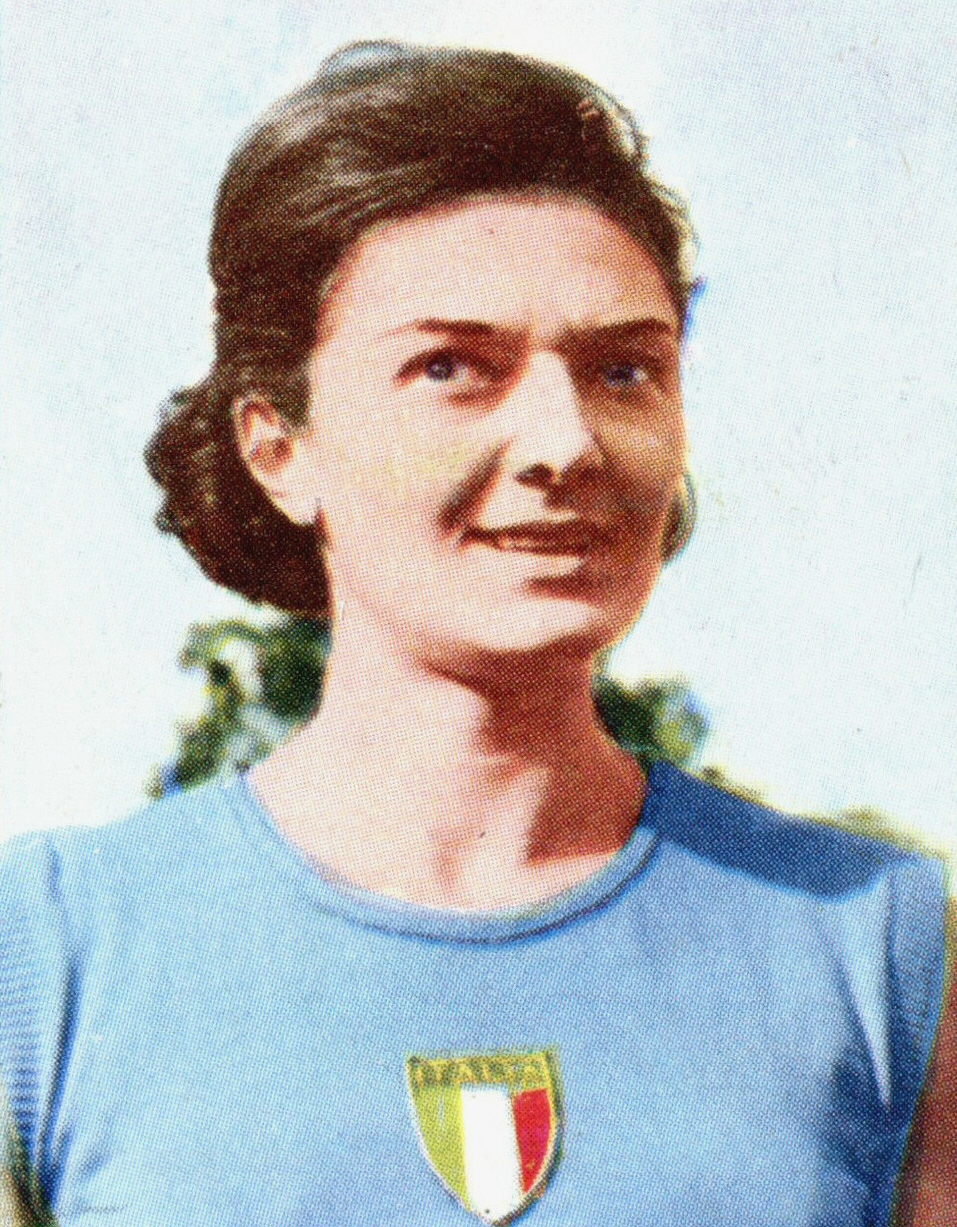
Elivia Ballotta

Event	Gold		Silver		Bronze	
100 yards	(Poland) Irena Kirszenstein	10.68	Jill Hall	10.77	Liz Gill	10.83
220 yards	Janet Simpson	24.06	Maureen Tranter	24.16	Daphne Arden	24.36
440 yards	Joy Grieveson	55.11	Deidre Watkinson	55.15	(East Germany) Gertrud Schmidt	56.02
880 yards	Anne Smith	2:07.5	Pam Piercy	2:09.4	(South Africa) Anne McKenzie	2:09.4
1 mile	Joyce Smith	4:53.46	Rita Lincoln	4:56.96	(Australia) Brenda Carr	4:57.70
80 metres hurdles	Pat Jones	11.28	(Poland) Teresa Ciepły	11.30	(Poland) Elżbieta Bednarek	11.33
100 metres hurdles	Pat Jones	13.8	Susan Mills	13.8	Patricia Baileff	14.1
200 metres hurdles	Susan Mills	28.14	Susan Webb	28.64	Patricia Baileff	29.10
High jump	Frances Slaap	1.702	Linda Knowles	1.676	Rosemary Curtis	1.626
Long jump	Mary Rand	6.40	(Poland) Irena Kirszenstein	6.39	(West Germany) Helga Hoffmann	6.14
Shot put	(West Germany) Gertrud Schäfer	14.81	(Northern Ireland) Mary Peters	14.06	Kathryn Duckett	13.07
Discus throw	(Italy) Elivia Ballotta	50.56	(West Germany) Kriemhild Limberg	50.10	(Scotland) Rosemary Payne	48.0
Javelin	(West Germany) Ameli Koloska	53.16	Averil Williams	43.09	Mary Brown	42.51
Pentathlon +	(Northern Ireland) Mary Peters	4413	Pat Jones	4083	Gwenda Matthews	3979
1½ mile walk	Judy Farr	12:14.2	Margaret Lewis	12:33.8	Joan Wallis	12:38.8

+ Held on 8 May at Parliament Hill

== See also ==
- 1965 AAA Championships
