= 1962 WAAA Championships =

British athletics event

- Dates: 7 July
- Host city: London
- Venue: White City Stadium
- Level: Senior
- Type: Outdoor

The 1962 WAAA Championships were the national track and field championships for women in the United Kingdom.

The event was held at White City Stadium, London, on 7 July 1962.

== Results ==
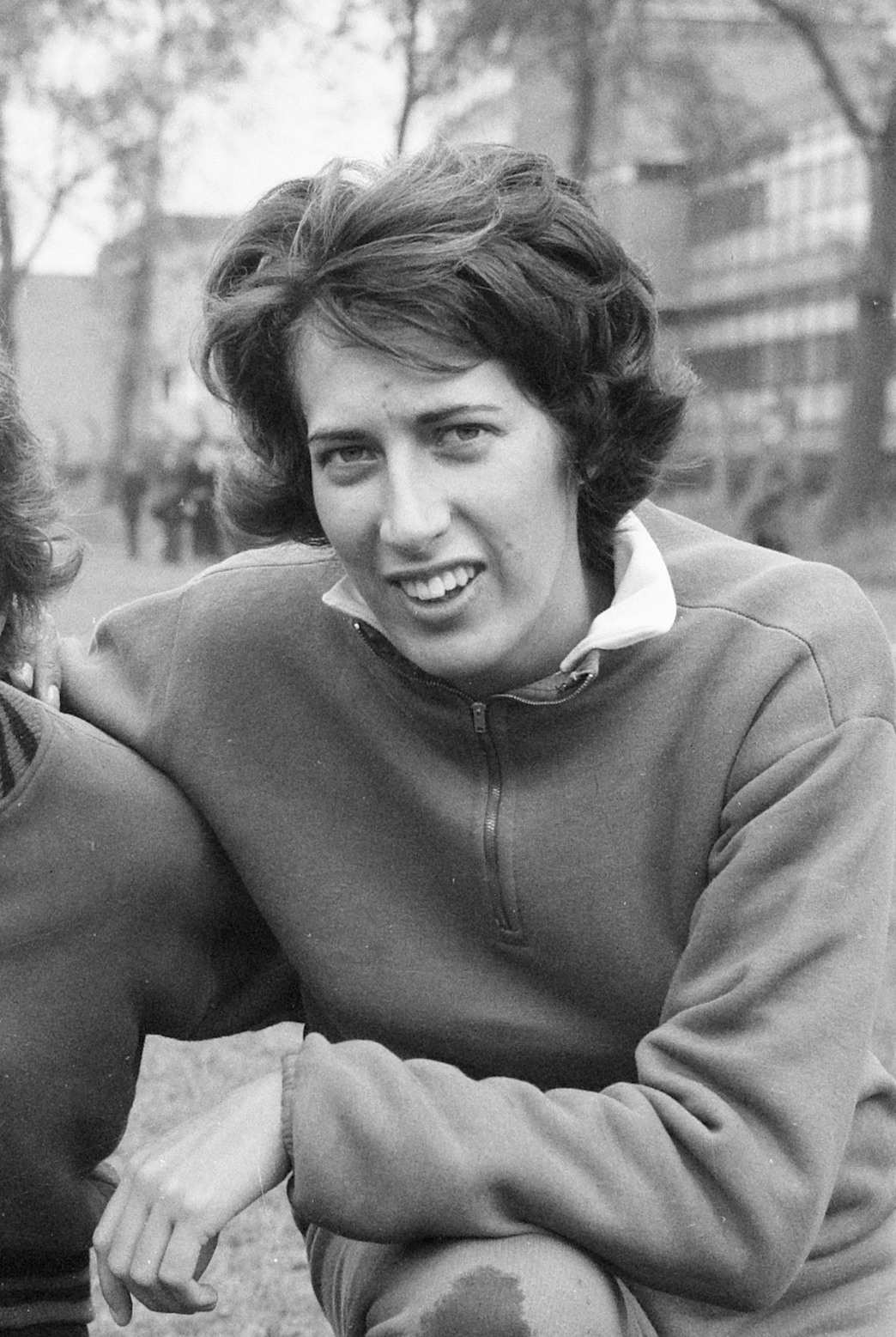
Joke Bijleveld, winner of the long jump

Event	Gold		Silver		Bronze	
100 yards	Dorothy Hyman	10.6 =NR	Daphne Arden	10.7	(Australia) Betty Moore	10.7
220 yards	Dorothy Hyman	23.8	(West Germany) Jutta Heine	24.1	Daphne Arden	24.5
440 yards	Jean Sorrell	55.1 NR	Joy Grieveson	55.3	(Republic of Ireland) Maeve Kyle	55.4
880 yards	Joy Jordan	2:08.0	Phyllis Perkins	2:09.4	(West Germany) Anita Wörner	2:09.8
1 mile	(Australia) Joan Beretta	4:57.0	Madeleine Ibbotson	5:00.4	(Scotland) Helen Cherry	5:02.5
80 metres hurdles	(Australia) Betty Moore	10.7	(West Germany) Erika Fisch	10.7	(France) Denise Guénard	11.0
200 metres hurdles	Pat Nutting	28.9	Susan Mills	29.0	Maxine Botley	29.3
High jump	(Romania) Iolanda Balaș	1.829	Frances Slaap	1.702	Thelma Hopkins	1.676
Long jump	(Netherlands) Joke Bijleveld	6.21	(West Germany) Ingrid Becker	6.02	Thelma Hopkins	5.97
Shot put	Suzanne Allday	13.88	(Northern Ireland) Mary Peters	13.04	Valerie Woods	12.55
Discus throw	(Netherlands) Loesje Boling	47.28	Suzanne Allday	46.09	Ann Duckham	42.36
Javelin	Sue Platt	50.72	Rosemary Morgan	47.98	Barbara Nicholls	45.46
Pentathlon +	(Northern Ireland) Mary Peters	4190	Brenda Gill	3891	Christine Lilleyman	3762
1½ mile walk	Judy Farr (Woodsford)	12:20.0	Sheila Jennings	12:33.8	Maureen Eyre	12:50.2

+ Held on 12 May at Chiswick

== See also ==
- 1962 AAA Championships
