= David Emery (sports journalist) =

British sports journalist (1946–2023)

David Emery (13 October 1946 – 4 June 2023) was a British sports journalist and author. He was chief sports writer and sports editor at the Daily Express, founded a number of sports newspapers, and wrote Lillian, the posthumous biography of his fiancée, the athlete Lillian Board.

== Career ==
In 1966, he was a district reporter on the Surrey Comet, having completed a journalism training course.

His first job in Fleet Street was with the Daily Mail. He also worked on the Daily Star in its very early years but it was at the Daily Express that he established himself as one of the top sports writers in the country covering the 1984 Olympics where he filed on the Zola Budd and Mary Decker drama.

He also covered the 1986 World Cup in Mexico, reporting on Maradona’s notorious "Hand of God" goal before being appointed sports editor later that year, a position he held for ten years.

Emery was also a long-time supporter of the Sports Journalists’ Association, serving on the committee and as chairman in 1986.

After leaving the Express in 1996 he worked for the Press Association and he launched the weekly newspaper "Sport First" in March 1998 which quickly achieved a circulation of nearly 100,000.

This was followed by the publication of weekly newspapers "The Football League Paper", "The Non-League Paper" (2000), "The Cricket Paper" and "The Rugby Paper" (2008) and "The Hockey Paper" 2016 by his publishing company Greenways Media.

In 2003 he was chairman of the Press Golf Society and in 1980 was a founding member of 26.2 Road Runners club, Surbiton.

Following the death of his fiancée, international athlete Lillian Board, he wrote her biography and subsequently married her twin sister Irene with whom he had two daughters, Alexandra and Georgie and two sons, Matt and Sam. He also has another son, Jack, with his second wife, Sarah.
