= List of British champions in decathlon/heptathlon =

The British decathlon champions and the British heptathlon champions covers three competitions; the current British Athletics Championships which was founded in 2007, the preceding AAA Championships (1928-2006) and the UK Athletics Championships which existed from 1977 until 1997 and ran concurrently with the AAA Championships.

Where an international athlete won the AAA Championships the highest ranking UK athlete is considered the National Champion in this list.

== Past winners ==
AAA Championships men's event only
Year	Men's champion
1928	Howard Ford
1936	Ronald Walker
1937	Jim Miggins
1938	Thomas Lockton
1947	Harry Whittle
1948	Les Pinder

AAA Championships & WAAA Championships
Year	Men's champion	Year	Women's champion
Decathlon		Pentathlon	
1949	Harry Whittle	1949	Bertha Crowther
1950	Harry Whittle	1950	Bertha Crowther
1951	Les Pinder	1951	Dorothy Tyler
1952	Les Pinder	1952	Sheila Sewell
1953	Les Pinder	1953	Jean Desforges
1954	Les Pinder	1954	Jean Desforges
1955	Malcolm Dodds	1955	Margaret Rowley
1956	Vic Matthews	1956	Margaret Rowley
1957	Hywell Williams	1957	Margaret Rowley
1958	Colin Andrews	1958	Janet Gaunt
1959	Colin Andrews	1959	Mary Bignal
1960	Colin Andrews	1960	Mary Bignal
1961	George McLachlan	1961	Carole Hamby
1962	George McLachlan	1962	Mary Peters
1963	John Jones	1963	Mary Peters
1964	Derek Clarke	1964	Mary Peters
1965	Norman Foster	1965	Mary Peters
1966	Derek Clarke	1966	Mary Peters
1967	Peter Gabbett	1967	Janet Oldall
1968	Peter Gabbett	1968	Mary Peters
1969	Stewart McCallum	1969	Moira Walls
1970	Peter Gabbett	1970	Mary Peters
1971	David Kidner	1971	Janet Honour
1972	Barry King	1972	Ann Wilson
1973	David Kidner	1973	Mary Peters
1974	Mike Corden	1974	Ann Wilson
1975	Pan Zeniou	1975	Susan Wright
1976	Daley Thompson	1976	Susan Longden
1977	Pan Zeniou	1977	Susan Longden
1978	Alan Drayton	1978	Yvette Wray
1979	Bradley McStravick	1979	Marcia Marriott
1980	Bradley McStravick	1980	Sue Longden
Decathlon		Heptathlon	
1981	Colin Boreham	1981	Kathy Warren
1982	Fidelis Obikwu	1982	Judy Livermore
1983	Ken Hayford	1983	Judy Livermore
1984	Ken Hayford	1984	Sarah Owen
1985	Greg Richards	1985	Charmaine Johnson
1986	Greg Richards	1986	Marcia Marriott
1987	Ken Hayford	1987	Charmaine Johnson

AAA Championships
Year	Men AAA	Women AAA
1988	Eugene Gilkes	Joanne Mulliner
1989	Alex Kruger	Kim Hagger
1990	Brian Taylor	Joanne Mulliner
1991	Eric Hollingsworth	Clova Court
1992	Alex Kruger	Clova Court
1993	Barry Thomas	Clova Court
1994	Barry Thomas	Vikki Schofield
1995	Stephen Rogers	Emma Beales
1996	Barry Thomas	Kerry Jury
1997	Alexis Sharp	Clova Court
1998	Rafer Joseph	Clova Court
1999	Paul Jones	Katherine Livesey
2000	Alex Kruger	Julie Hollman
2001	John Heanley	Laura Redmond
2002	Adrian Hemery	Caroline Pearce
2003	Paul Tohill	Fiona Harrison
2004	Louis Evling-Jones	Caroline Pearce
2005	Ben Hazell	Kate Brewington
2006	Dean Showler-Davis	Katia Lannon

British Athletics Championships 2007 to present
Year	Men's champion	Women's champion
2007	Ben Hazell	Phyllis Agbo
2008	Daniel Awde	Julie Hollman
2009	Guy Stroud	Catherine Holdsworth
2010	David Guest	Dominique Blaize
2011	Daniel Awde	Gemma Weetman
2012	Edward Dunford	Jo Rowland
2013	Osmun Muskwe	Jessica Tappin
2014	Michael Holden	Devon Byrne
2015	Jack Andrew	Elise Lovell
2016	Aiden Davies	Jessica Taylor
2017	James Finney	Niamh Emerson
2018	Ben Gregory	Emma Nwofor
2019	John Lane	Holly Mills
2020	nc	nc
2021	Tim Duckworth	Katie Stainton
2022	Elliot Thompson	Jodie Smith
2023	nc	nc
2024	Sammy Ball	Eden Robinson
2025	Callum Newby	Ellen Barber
2026	Sammy Ball	Neve Davenport

- NBA = No British athlete in medal placings
- nc = not contested
