= Pat Jones (hurdler) =

British hurdler

Personal information
- Nationality: British (English)
- Born: 20 June 1942 (age 84) Croydon, England
- Height: 173 cm (5 ft 8 in)
- Weight: 62 kg (137 lb)

Sport
- Sport: Athletics
- Event: hurdles
- Club: Birchfield Harriers

Patricia Ann "Pat" Jones (born 20 June 1942) is a British former track and field hurdler who mostly competed in the 80 metres hurdles, who competed at the 1968 Summer Olympics.

== Biography ==
Born in Croydon, England, Jones became a member of Birchfield Harriers, a Birmingham-based athletic club.

Jones became the national 200 metres hurdles champion after winning the British WAAA Championships title at the 1964 WAAA Championships, setting a world record 27.9 seconds. The following year she not only retained her 200 hurdles title but also became the national 80 metres hurdles champion at the 1965 WAAA Championships. She was also runner-up to future Olympic champion Mary Peters in the WAAA women's pentathlon in 1965. In 1966 Jones regained the 200 metres hurdles WAAA title.

Jones made a clean sweep of the three WAAA hurdles titles at the 1967 WAAA Championships and was runner-up to East Germany's Karin Balzer at the 1967 European Cup and won the 1967 European Cup semi-final with a best of 10.6 seconds, which ranked her eighth in the world for the discipline that year.

At the 1968 Olympic Games in Mexico City, she represented Great Britain (being eliminated in the first round).

Jones also competed at the AAA Indoor Championships and though she never won a title there she reached the 60-yard hurdles podium in 1965 and 1966, as well as the podium of the 1966 220 yards sprint. In regional competition, she had two wins in the 200 m hurdles at the North of England Athletics Championships (1962, 1963), and twelve individual wins at the Midland Counties Championships, including straight wins in the 80 m hurdles from 1964 to 1969, consecutive wins in the 200 m hurdles from 1964 to 1967, and three wins in the pentathlon between 1965 and 1968 (interrupted by Rosemary Payne in 1966).

== International competitions ==
Year	Competition	Venue	Position	Event	Notes
1967	European Cup	Kyiv, Soviet Union	2nd	80 m hurdles	10.9
1968	Olympic Games	Mexico City, Mexico	6th (heats)	80 m hurdles	11.0

== National titles ==
- WAAA Championships
  - 80 m hurdles: 1965, 1967
  - 100 m hurdles: 1965, 1967
  - 200 m hurdles: 1964, 1966, 1967
