= Mary Green (sprinter) =

British sprinter (1943–2022)

Mary Green née Tagg
Personal information
- Nationality: British (English)
- Born: 10 November 1943 Derby, England
- Died: 7 April 2022 (aged 78)
- Height: 166 cm (5 ft 5 in)
- Weight: 51 kg (112 lb)

Sport
- Sport: Athletics
- Event: Sprinting / 400 metres
- Club: Great Yarmouth / Norfolk Olympiades

Josephine Mary Green (née Tagg; 10 November 1943 – 7 April 2022) was a British sprinter who competed at the 1968 Summer Olympics.

== Biography ==
Tagg finished third behind Joy Grieveson in the 440 yards event at the 1963 WAAA Championships. Tagg married Andrew Green in late 1965 and competed under her married name thereafter.

Green did not medal again in the WAAA Championships until finishing second behind Lillian Board in the 440 yards event at the 1967 WAAA Championships.

At the 1968 Olympic Games in Mexico City, she represented Great Britain in the women's 400 metres competition.

She died in April 2022, at the age of 78.

== Family ==
Green was originally from Norfolk. Her brother, Mike Tagg, was also an athlete and represented Great Britain at the same Olympics.
