= Janet Simpson =

English sprinter

Personal information
- Nationality: British (English)
- Born: 2 September 1944 Barnet, England
- Died: 14 March 2010 (aged 65)
- Height: 166 cm (5 ft 5 in)
- Weight: 65 kg (143 lb)

Sport
- Sport: Athletics
- Event: Sprints
- Club: London Olympiades
Medal record
Women's athletics
Representing Great Britain
Olympic Games
Bronze medal – third place	1964 Tokyo	4 × 100 metres relay
European Championships
Gold medal – first place	1969 Athens	4 × 400 metres relay
Representing England
Commonwealth Games
Silver medal – second place	1966 Kingston	4 × 110 yards relay

Janet Mary Simpson (2 September 1944 – 14 March 2010) was a British athlete who competed in sprint events and the 400 metres and competed at three Olympic Games.

== Biography ==
Simpson finished third behind Daphne Arden in the 220 yards event at the 1964 WAAA Championships. Shortly afterwards at the 1964 Summer Olympics held in Tokyo, Japan, Simpson represented Great Britain in the 4 × 100 metres relay, where she won the bronze medal with her team-mates Mary Rand, Daphne Arden and Dorothy Hyman. She emulated her mother, Violet Webb, who had won bronze in the same event at the 1932 Summer Olympics in Los Angeles.

Simpson became the national 220 yards champion after winning the British WAAA Championships title at the 1965 WAAA Championships and retained her title the following year at the 1966 WAAA Championships.

Simpson competed for England in the 1966 Commonwealth Games held in Kingston, Jamaica, in the 4 × 110 yards relay, where she won the silver medal with her team-mates Maureen Tranter, Daphne Slater and Jill Hall.

She finished fourth in the 400 metres final at the 1968 Summer Olympics in Mexico City, missing the bronze medal by only 0.32 seconds.

She also was a member of the Great Britain team that won a gold medal in the 4 × 400 m relay at the 1969 European Championships in Athletics in Athens, Greece, setting a world record time of 3:30.8 minutes. Running the third leg, Janet ran the joint fastest time (52.1) of the British quartet and made up 15 metres on the leader, Eliane Jacq of France. The other members of that victorious team were Rosemary Stirling, Pat Lowe and Lillian Board.

She retired from athletics in 1969 but made a comeback to compete in the 1972 Summer Olympics in Munich, helping the Great Britain relay squad finish fifth in the final of the 4 × 400 metres in British record time (3:28.75).

She later married the Swiss sprinter Philippe Clerc, 200 metres champion at the 1969 European Athletics Championships. She died of a heart attack on 14 March 2010 at the age of 65.
