= Joan Page-Allison =

British middle-distance runner

Joan Page OBE
Personal information
- Nationality: British (English)
- Born: 10 June 1947 (age 79) London, England
- Height: 168 cm (5 ft 6 in)
- Weight: 55 kg (121 lb)

Sport
- Sport: Athletics
- Event: Middle-distance running
- Club: Cambridge Harriers
Medal record
Athletics
Representing England
Commonwealth Games
Silver medal – second place	1970 Edinburgh	1,500m
Silver medal – second place	1974 Christchurch	1,500m

Joan Florence Page OBE (née Allison; born 10 June 1947) is a retired British international middle-distance runner.

== Biography ==
Page competed in the women's 800 metres at the 1968 Summer Olympics.

Page represented England and won a silver medal in the 1,500 metres, at the 1970 British Commonwealth Games in Edinburgh, Scotland. Page married shortly after the Games and competed as Allison thereafter.

Allison finished second behind Rita Ridley in the 1500 metres event at the 1971 WAAA Championships.

Allison became the British 1500 metres champion after winning the British WAAA Championships title at the 1973 WAAA Championships. The following year, Allison won a second silver medal in the 1,500 metres and finished fourth in the 800 metres at the 1974 British Commonwealth Games in Christchurch, New Zealand.

She was appointed Officer of the Order of the British Empire (OBE) in the 1995 Birthday Honours for services to athletics.
