= List of British champions in sprint hurdles =

The British 110 metres hurdles athletics champions (men) and 100 metres hurdles athletics champions (women) covers four competitions; the current British Athletics Championships which was founded in 2007, the preceding LAC Championships (1866-1879), the AAA Championships (1880-2006) and finally the UK Athletics Championships which existed from 1977 until 1997 and ran concurrently with the AAA Championships.

Where an international athlete won the AAA Championships the highest ranking UK athlete is considered the National Champion in this list.

The most successful athlete in the event was Colin Jackson who won 18 national titles across 11 years in the AAA Championship/UK Athletics Championship era, winning both titles in seven of those years. The most 'undisputed' titles won is 9 by Don Finlay in the AAA era. Tiffany Porter and Sally Gunnell each won seven titles; Gunnell also won a UK Championship title in the dual championships era. Shirley Strong won nine titles in the dual championship era, six in the AAA Championship continuity and three in the UK Championships covering six years.

== Past winners ==
AAC Championships 120 yards hurdles, men's event only
Year	Men's champion
1866	Thomas Milvain
1867	Arthur Law
1868	William Tennent
1869	George Nunn
1870	John Stirling
1871	Edward Garnier
1872	John Stirling
1873	Hugh Upcher
1874	Hugh Upcher
1875	Hugh Upcher
1876	Alfred Loder
1877	John Reay
1878	Samuel Palmer
1879	Samuel Palmer / Charles Lockton

AAA Championships 120 yards hurdles, men's event only
Year	Men's champion
1880	George Lawrence
1881	George Lawrence
1882	Samuel Palmer
1883	Samuel Palmer
1884	Charles Gowthorpe
1885	Charles Daft
1886	Charles Daft
1887	John Le Fleming
1888	Sherard Joyce
1889	Cecil Haward
1890	Charles Daft
1891	NBA
1892	Godfrey Shaw
1893	Godfrey Shaw
1894	Godfrey Shaw
1895	Godfrey Shaw
1896	Godfrey Shaw
1897	Alfred Trafford
1898	Howard Parkes
1899	William Paget-Tomlinson
1900	Norman Pritchard
1901	Alfred Trafford
1902	Alfred Trafford
1903	George Garnier
1904	Robert Stronach
1905	Robert Stronach
1906	Robert Stronach
1907	Oswald Groenings
1908	Oswald Groenings
1909	Alfred Healey
1910	Gerard Anderson
1911	Percy Phillips
1912	Gerard Anderson
1913	George Gray
1914	George Gray
1919	George Gray
1920	George Gray
1921	Frederick Nicholas

AAA Championships & WAAA Championships
Year	Men's champion	Year	Women's champion
Sprint hurdles
1922	Fred Gaby	1922	Daisy Wright
1923	Fred Gaby	1923	Mary Lines
1924	Fred Gaby	1924	Mary Lines
1925	Fred Gaby	1925	Hilda Hatt
1926	Fred Gaby	1926	Hilda Hatt
1927	Fred Gaby	1927	Hilda Hatt^ / Muriel Gunn^^
1928	Fred Gaby	1928	Hilda Hatt^^
120 yards/80 metres
1929	Lord Burghley	1929	Hilda Hatt^{5}
1930	Lord Burghley	1930	Muriel Cornell
1931	Lord Burghley	1931	Elsie Green
1932	Don Finlay	1932	Elsie Green
1933	Don Finlay	1933	Elsie Green
1934	Don Finlay	1934	Elsie Green
1935	Don Finlay	1935	Elsie Green^{5}
1936	Don Finlay	1936	Violet Webb
1937	Don Finlay	1937	Kathleen Tiffen
1938	Don Finlay	1938	Kate Robertson
1939	Thomas Lockton	1939	Kate Robertson
1945	nc	1945	Zoe Hancock
1946	Rupert Powell	1946	Bertha Crowther
1947	Don Finlay	1947	Maureen Gardner
1948	Joe Birrell	1948	Maureen Gardner
1949	Don Finlay	1949	Jean Desforges
1950	Peter Hildreth	1950	Maureen Dyson
1951	Jack Parker	1951	Maureen Dyson
1952	Peter Hildreth	1952	Jean Desforges
1953	Peter Hildreth	1953	Jean Desforges
1954	Jack Parker	1954	Jean Desforges
1955	Jack Parker	1955	Margaret Francis
1956	Peter Hildreth	1956	Pamela Elliott
1957	Peter Hildreth	1957	Thelma Hopkins
1958	Peter Hildreth	1958	Carole Quinton
1959	Vic Matthews	1959	Mary Bignal
1960	Mike Parker	1960	Carole Quinton
1961	Bob Birrell	1961	Ann Charlesworth
1962	Laurie Taitt	1962	Dorothy Window
120 yards/100 metres
1963	Laurie Taitt	1963	Pat Nutting
1964	Mike Parker	1964	Pat Pryce
1965	Laurie Taitt	1965	Pat Jones
1966	David Hemery	1966	Pat Pryce / Mary Rand^^^
1967	Alan Pascoe	1967	Pat Jones
1968	Alan Pascoe	1968	Pat Pryce / Christine Perera
110 metres/100 metres - metrification
1969	Alan Pascoe	1969	Christine Perera
1970	David Hemery	1970	Mary Peters
1971	Alan Pascoe	1971	Sheila Garnett
1972	Alan Pascoe	1972	Judy Vernon
1973	Berwyn Price	1973	Judy Vernon
1974	Berwyn Price	1974	Lorna Drysdale
1975	Berwyn Price	1975	Lorna Boothe
1976	Berwyn Price	1976	Sharon Colyear

AAA Championships/WAAA Championships & UK Athletics Championships dual championships era 1977-1987
Year	AAA Men	Year	WAAA Women	Year	UK Men	UK Women
1977	Berwyn Price	1977	Lorna Boothe	1977	Berwyn Price	Sharon Colyear
1978	Berwyn Price	1978	Sharon Colyear	1978	Berwyn Price	Sharon Colyear
1979	Mark Holtom	1979	Shirley Strong	1979	Mark Holtom	Shirley Strong
1980	Mark Holtom	1980	Shirley Strong	1980	Wilbert Greaves	Shirley Strong
1981	Mark Holtom	1981	Shirley Strong	1981	Kieran Moore	Manndy Laing
1982	Mark Holtom	1982	Shirley Strong	1982	Wilbert Greaves	Elaine McMaster
1983	Mark Holtom	1983	Shirley Strong	1983	Nigel Walker	Shirley Strong
1984	Nigel Walker	1984	Shirley Strong	1984	Hugh Teape	Pat Rollo
1985	Nigel Walker	1985	Kim Hagger	1985	Wilbert Greaves	Judy Simpson
1986	Colin Jackson	1986	Sally Gunnell	1986	Colin Jackson	Sally Gunnell
1987	Jon Ridgeon	1987	Sally Gunnell	1987	Tony Jarrett	Lesley-Ann Skeete

AAA Championships & UK Athletics Championships dual championships era 1988-1997
Year	Men AAA	Women AAA	Year	Men UK	Women UK
1988	Colin Jackson	Sally Gunnell	1988	Tony Jarrett+	Lynne Green
1989	Colin Jackson	Sally Gunnell	1989	Colin Jackson	Kay Morley
1990	Colin Jackson	Lesley-Ann Skeete	1990	Colin Jackson	Kay Morley
1991	David Nelson	Sally Gunnell	1991	David Nelson	Lesley-Ann Skeete
1992	Colin Jackson	Sally Gunnell	1992	Colin Jackson	Kay Morley
1993	Colin Jackson	Sally Gunnell	1993	Andrew Tulloch	Jacqui Agyepong
1994	Andrew Tulloch	Clova Court	n/a		
1995	Neil Owen	Melanie Wilkins	n/a		
1996	Colin Jackson	Angie Thorp	n/a		
1997	Damien Greaves	Angie Thorp	1997	Tony Jarrett	Angie Thorp

AAA Championships second era 1998-2006
Year	Men's champion	Women's champion
1998	Colin Jackson	Keri Maddox
1999	Colin Jackson	Keri Maddox^{2}
2000	Colin Jackson	Diane Allahgreen
2001	Tony Jarrett	Diane Allahgreen
2002	Colin Jackson^{11}	Diane Allahgreen^{3}
2003	Damien Greaves^{2}	Rachel King
2004	Robert Newton	Sarah Claxton
2005	Allan Scott	Sarah Claxton
2006	Andy Turner	Sarah Claxton

British Athletics Championships 2007 to present
Year	Men's champion	Women's champion
2007	Andy Turner	Jessica Ennis
2008	Andy Turner	Sarah Claxton^{4}
2009	Andy Turner^{4}	Jessica Ennis
2010	Will Sharman	Louise Hazel
2011	Lawrence Clarke	Tiffany Porter
2012	Andrew Pozzi	Jessica Ennis^{3}
2013	Will Sharman	Tiffany Porter
2014	Will Sharman^{3}	Tiffany Porter
2015	Lawrence Clarke^{2}	Tiffany Porter
2016	Andrew Pozzi	Tiffany Porter
2017	David King	Alicia Barrett
2018	Andrew Pozzi^{3}	Alicia Barrett
2019	David King	Cindy Ofili
2020	David King^{3}	Cindy Ofili
2021	Tade Ojora	Tiffany Porter^{6}
2022	Tade Ojora	Cindy Sember
2023	Tade Ojora	Cindy Sember
2024	Daniel Goriola	Cindy Sember^{5}
2025	Tade Ojora^{4}	Alicia Barrett^{3}
2026	Sam Bennett	Marcia Sey

- NBA = No British athlete in medal placings
- nc = not contested
- ^ 75 metres hurdles
- ^^ 100 yards hurdles
- ^^^ 100 metres hurdles
