= 1964 WAAA Championships =

British athletics event

- Dates: 4 July
- Host city: London
- Venue: White City Stadium
- Level: Senior
- Type: Outdoor

The 1964 WAAA Championships were the national track and field championships for women in the United Kingdom.

The event was held at White City Stadium, London, on 4 July 1964.

== Results ==
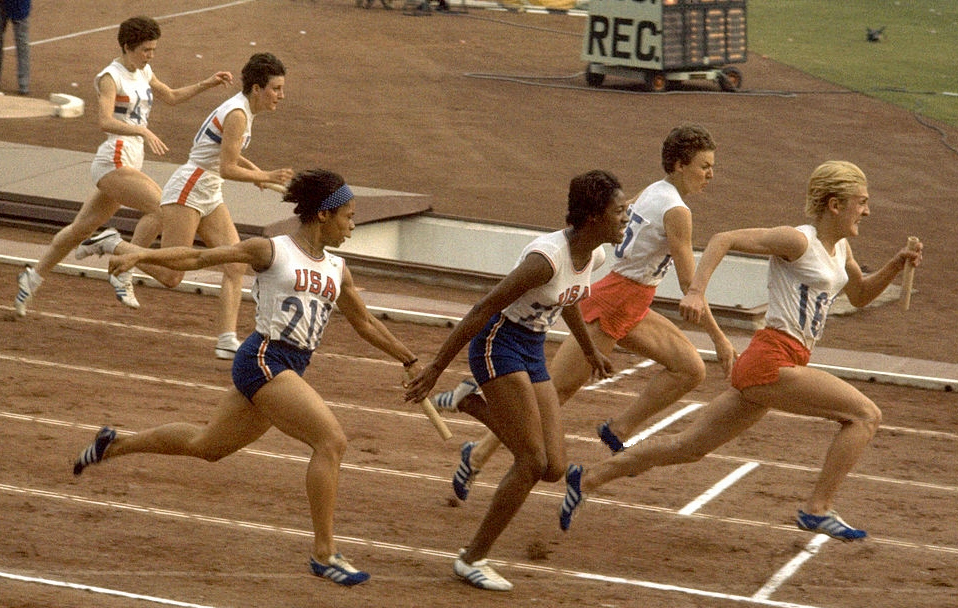
Daphne Arden (top left)

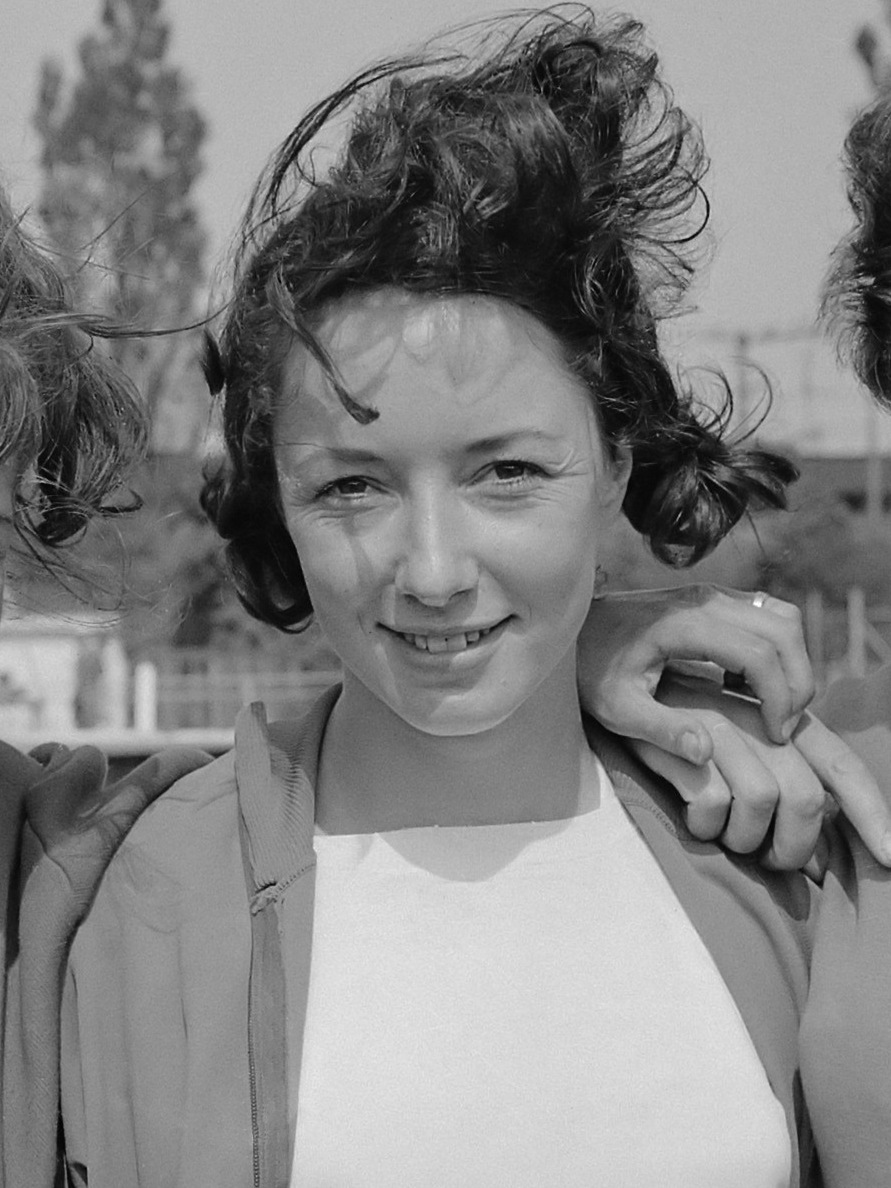
Ann Packer

Event	Gold		Silver		Bronze	
100 yards	Daphne Arden	10.6 =NR	Mary Rand	10.7	Dorothy Hyman	10.8
220 yards	Daphne Arden	23.6 NR	Dorothy Hyman	24.0	Janet Simpson	24.4
440 yards	Ann Packer	54.3	Joy Grieveson	55.8	(Republic of Ireland) Maeve Kyle	55.9
880 yards	Anne Smith	2:08.0	Anita Webb	2:10.5	(Canada) Abby Hoffman	2:12.0
1 mile	Alison Leggett	4:56.0	Penelope Gardner	4:56.9	Pamela Davies	5:04.1
80 metres hurdles	Pat Pryce	10.7	(Japan) Ikuko Yoda	10.8	Thelma Hopkins	11.2
100 metres hurdles	Pat Pryce	13.4	Maxine Botley	14.3	Susan Mills	14.3
200 metres hurdles	Pat Jones	27.9 WR	Susan Mills	28.3	Susan Webb	29.0
High jump	Frances Slaap	1.727	Linda Knowles	1.702	Gwenda Matthews	1.702
Long jump	Mary Rand	6.58 NR	(Norway) Berit Tøien	6.46	Sheila Parkin	6.29
Shot put	(Northern Ireland) Mary Peters	14.22	(Netherlands) Cornelia van Wijk	14.19	Suzanne Allday	13.87
Discus throw	(West Germany) Kriemhild Limberg	50.92	(Scotland) Rosemary Payne	46.25	Suzanne Allday	42.10
Javelin	(West Germany) Anneliese Gerhards	51.82	Sue Platt	49.26	(Norway) Oddrun Lange	45.46
Pentathlon +	(Northern Ireland) Mary Peters	4801 NR	Brenda Gill	4045	Annette Fathers	3588
1½ mile walk	Judy Farr	12:06.8	Joyce Heath	12:49.2	Margaret Lewis	13:14.0

+ Held on 30 May at Birmingham University

== See also ==
- 1964 AAA Championships
