= List of British champions in 200 metres hurdles =

The British 200 metres hurdles athletics champions (women) and 220 yards hurdles athletics champions (men) covers the Amateur Athletic Club Championships from 1952 until 1972.

Where an international athlete won the AAA Championships the highest ranking UK athlete is considered the National Champion in this list. The events were discontinued after the 1962 (men) and 1972 (women) editions.

== Past winners ==
AAA Championships 220 yards hurdles, men's event only
| Year | Men's champion |
|---|---|
| 1952 | Peter Hildreth |
| 1953 | Harry Whittle |
| 1954 | Peter Hildreth |
| 1955 | Paul Vine |
| 1956 | Paul Vine |
| 1957 | John Scott-Oldfield |
| 1958 | Ken Wilmshurst |
| 1959 | John Metcalf |
| 1960 | Chris Surety |

AAA Championships / WAAA Championships 220 yards hurdles (men), 200 metres hurdles (women)
| Year | Men's champion | Year | Women's champion |
|---|---|---|---|
| 1961 | Ken Wilmshurst | 1961 | Pat Nutting |
| 1962 | Raymond Barnes | 1962 | Pat Nutting |

WAAA Championships 200 metres hurdles
| Year | Women's champion |
|---|---|
| 1963 | Pat Nutting |
| 1964 | Pat Jones |
| 1965 | Susan Mills |
| 1966 | Pat Jones |
| 1967 | Pat Jones |
| 1968 | Christine Perera |
| 1969 | Susan Hayward |
| 1970 | Christine Bell |
| 1971 | Sharon Colyear |
| 1972 | Julie Wood |

DISCONTINUED
