= Anne Farquhar =

English javelin thrower

Personal information
- Nationality: British (English)
- Born: 8 October 1948 (age 77) Battersea, London, England

Sport
- Sport: Athletics
- Event: Javelin throw
- Club: Selsonia Ladies AC
Medal record
Athletics
Representing England
Commonwealth Games
Silver medal – second place	1970 Edinburgh	javelin

Anne Farquhar (born 1948), is a female former athlete who competed for England.

== Biography ==
Farquhar finished second behind Sue Platt in the javelin event at the 1968 WAAA Championships.

She represented England and won a silver medal in the javelin, at the 1970 British Commonwealth Games in Edinburgh, Scotland.

Farquhar became the national javelin throw champion after winning the British WAAA Championships title at the 1978 WAAA Championships.
