= Christine Bell (athlete) =

British hurdler

Christine Bell née Perera
Personal information
- Nationality: British (English)
- Born: 11 October 1949 (age 76)

Sport
- Sport: Athletics
- Event: hurdles
- Club: Stretford AC
Medal record
Athletics
Representing England
Commonwealth Games
Bronze medal – third place	1970 Edinburgh	100m hurdles

Christine Bell née Perera (born 1949), is a female former athlete who competed for England.

== Biography ==
Perera educated at Fairfield High School, became the national 100 metres hurdles champion after winning the British WAAA Championships title at the 1966 WAAA Championships. On 3 June 1967 in Blackburn she set an unofficial world-best time over 100 metres hurdles with 13.7 sec and later regained the WAAA 100 metres hurdles title at the 1968 WAAA Championships. She became engaged to fellow Stretford AC athlete Kevin Bell in January 1968.

In 1969 she won bronze at the European Indoor Games in Belgrade over 50 m hurdles and competed in the 1969 European Athletics Championships, in addition to winning the 1969 English indoor title over 60 metres hurdles.

Perera married Kevin Bell in 1970 and competed under her married name thereafter. Shortly afterwards Bell became the national 200 metres hurdles champion at the 1970 WAAA Championships and represented England at the 1970 British Commonwealth Games in Edinburgh, Scotland, winning a bronze medal in the 100 metres hurdles, .
