= Ingrid Becker =

German athlete (born 1942)

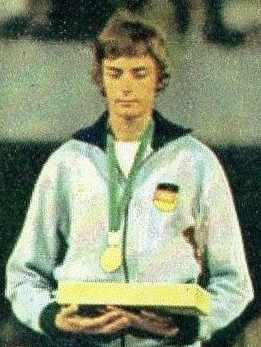
- Becker at the 1968 Olympics

Personal information
- Nationality: German
- Born: 26 September 1942 (age 83) Geseke, Province of Westphalia, Nazi Germany
- Height: 177 cm (5 ft 10 in)
- Weight: 66 kg (146 lb)

Sport
- Sport: Athletics
- Event: Pentathlon
- Club: LG Geseke; USC Mainz

Achievements and titles
- Personal bests: 100 m – 11.2 (1971); 200 m – 23.3 (1970); 100 mH – 13.5 (1970); HJ – 1.71 m (1961); LJ – 6.76 m (1971); Pentathlon – 5098 (1968)
Medal record
Women's athletics
Representing West Germany
Olympic Games
Gold medal – first place	1968 Mexico City	Pentathlon
Gold medal – first place	1972 Munich	4×100 m
European Championships
Gold medal – first place	1971 Helsinki	Long jump
Gold medal – first place	1971 Helsinki	4×100 m
Silver medal – second place	1969 Athens	4×100 m
Silver medal – second place	1971 Helsinki	100 m

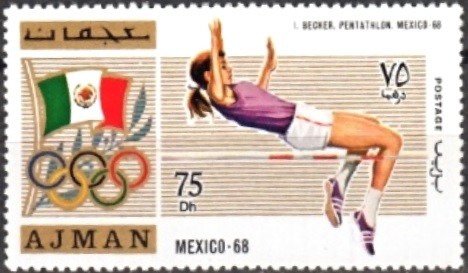
Ingrid Becker on a stamp of Ajman

Ingrid Mickler-Becker (German pronunciation: [ˈɪŋɡʁɪt ˈmɪklɐ ˈbɛkɐ]; née Ingrid Becker on 26 September 1942), is a former West German athlete who won gold medals at both the 1968 and 1972 Olympic Games.

== Biography ==
Her international career lasted from 1960 to 1972. She finished second behind Joke Bijleveld in the long jump event at the British 1962 WAAA Championships.

She won the pentathlon gold medal at the 1968 Summer Olympics and the 4 × 100 m relay gold medal at the 1972 Summer Olympics. Becker was the first German woman to clear 1.70 m in high jump (1960) and 6.50 m in the long jump (1967).

At the 1969 European Athletics Championships she won a silver medal as a member of the 4 × 100 metre relay team. In 1970 she won the European Cup Final in 100 metres, defeating the favourite Renate Stecher (GDR). Next year she won two European titles, in the long jump and 4 × 100 m relay, and placed second in the 100 meters. She won the British WAAA Championships title at the 1970 WAAA Championships.

Becker was elected German Sportswoman of the Year in 1968 and 1971, and received the Silbernes Lorbeerblatt (Silver Bay Leaf) in 1968. In 1969 she was awarded the Rudolf Harbig Memorial Award, and then for many years worked for the German Sports Federation. In 1982–84 and 1986–90 she was vice president of the Federal Panel of Women Sports of the German Athletics Association.

In 1990 she became secretary of state in Rhineland-Palatinate, but lost this position when her party, the CDU, lost the election in 1991. Afterwards she worked for a German-Swiss consultancy company. In 2005, she was awarded the "Goldene Sportpyramide" (Golden Sport Pyramid) from the Deutsche Sporthilfe (German Sports Aid), and in 2006 she was inducted into the Germany's Sports Hall of Fame. She is a member of the German National Olympic Committee.

Awards
Preceded by (Germany) Liesel Westermann	German Sportswoman of the Year; 1968	Succeeded by (Germany) Liesel Westermann
Preceded by (Germany) Heide Rosendahl	German Sportswoman of the Year; 1971	Succeeded by (Germany) Heide Rosendahl
