= Jill Hall (athlete) =

British athlete (born 1946)

Personal information
- Nationality: British (English)
- Born: 28 December 1946

Sport
- Sport: Athletics
- Event: Sprints
- Club: Mitcham AC
Medal record
Athletics
Representing England
British Empire & Commonwealth Games
| Silver medal – second place | 1966 Kingston | 4 x 110y relay |
| Bronze medal – third place | 1966 Kingston | 110 yards |

Jill Annette Hall (born 28 December 1946), is a female former athlete who competed for England in athletics events.

== Biography ==
Hall, a member of the Mitcham Athletics Club, finished second behind Irena Kirszenstein in the 100 yards event at the 1965 WAAA Championships but by virtue of being the highest placed British athlete was considered the British 100 yards champion. The following year at the 1966 WAAA Championships, Hall finished second again but this time behind Daphne Slater.

Shortly afterwards Hall represented the England team and won a silver medal in the 4 x 110 yards relay and a bronze medal in the 100 yards, at the 1966 British Empire and Commonwealth Games in Kingston, Jamaica.

Hall also reached the final of the 1966 European Athletics Championships.
