= Linda Knowles =

Former British athlete

Personal information
- Nationality: British (English)
- Born: 28 April 1946 (age 80) Hornchurch, England
- Height: 179 cm (5 ft 10 in)
- Weight: 65 kg (143 lb)

Sport
- Sport: Athletics
- Event: high jump
- Club: Hornchurch Harriers
Medal record
Women's athletics
Representing Great Britain
European Championships
Bronze medal – third place	1962 Belgrade	High jump
European Indoor Championships
Silver medal – second place	1967 Prague	High jump
Summer Universiade
Silver medal – second place	1967 Tokyo	High jump

Linda Yvonne Knowles (born 28 April 1946) is a retired track and field athlete who competed at the 1964 Summer Olympics.

== Biography ==
Knowles won the bronze medal at the 1962 European Championships in Belgrade, Yugoslavia when she was only 16. She represented England in the high jump at the 1962 British Empire and Commonwealth Games in Perth, Western Australia.

Knowles finished second behind Iolanda Balaș in the high jump event at the 1963 WAAA Championships and repeated the performance twice more at the 1964 WAAA Championships and 1965 WAAA Championships, only this time behind Frances Slaap.

At the 1964 Olympic Games in Tokyo, she represented Great Britain in the high jump competition.

Knowles became the national high jump champion after winning the British WAAA Championships title at the 1967 WAAA Championships.

Knowles married the Swedish decathlete Lennart Hedmark in 1968 and now resides in Malmö, Sweden.
