= Janet Honour =

British athlete

Janet Honour née Oldall
Personal information
- Nationality: British (English)
- Born: 1 September 1950 (age 75) Hammersmith, London

Sport
- Sport: Athletics
- Event: pentathlon
- Club: Woking AC

Janet Lee Honour née Janet Oldall (born 1950), is a female former athlete who competed for England.

== Biography ==
Oldall became the national pentathlon champion after winning the British WAAA Championships title at the 1967 WAAA Championships.

After finishing second behind Mary Peters at the 1970 WAAA Championships, she represented England at the British Commonwealth Games in Edinburgh, Scotland, finishing sixth in the high jump.

Oldall married George Honour in late 1970 and competed under her married name thereafter, which started with her regaining the national pentathlon title at the 1971 WAAA Championships.

Three years later she represented England in the 100 metres hurdles and pentathlon events, at the 1974 British Commonwealth Games in Christchurch, New Zealand.
