= Lillian Board =

British runner (1948–1970)

Lillian Board MBE
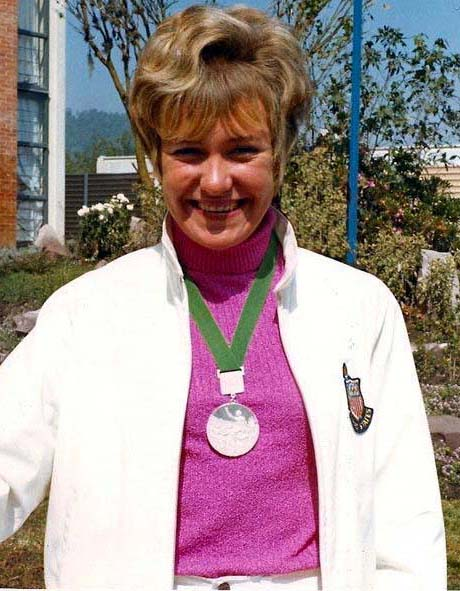
- Board at the 1968 Olympics

Personal information
- Full name: Lillian Barbara Board
- Nationality: British
- Born: 13 December 1948 Durban, South Africa
- Died: 26 December 1970 (aged 22) Munich, West Germany
- Height: 5 ft 6 in (168 cm)

Sport
- Country: Great Britain
- Sport: Track and field
- Events: 400 metres, 800 metres
- Club: London Olympiades
Medal record
Women's athletics
Representing Great Britain
Olympic Games
Silver medal – second place	1968 Mexico City	400 metres
European Championships
Gold medal – first place	1969 Athens	800 metres
Gold medal – first place	1969 Athens	4 × 400 m relay

Lillian Barbara Board (13 December 1948 – 26 December 1970) was a British athlete. She won the silver medal in the 400 metres at the 1968 Summer Olympics in Mexico City, and two gold medals at the 1969 European Championships in Athletics in Athens. Her career was cut short in 1970 when she developed the colorectal cancer that within months would claim her life at the age of 22.

== Early life ==
Board was born in Durban, South Africa on 13 December 1948. Her parents, George and Frances Board, had emigrated from Manchester, England in April 1947 with their son, George Alfred. Growing homesick, shortly after the birth of Lillian and her fraternal twin sister, Irene, the family moved back to Manchester in February 1950.

In 1956, the family moved to Ealing, west London, where Lillian and Irene, then aged 7, started studying at Drayton Green School.

== Developing athletics career ==
In 1960, at the age of 11, Lillian and her sister moved to Grange Secondary Modern Girls' School, also in Ealing and now part of The Ellen Wilkinson School for Girls. It was here in 1961 that Physical Education teacher Sue Gibson (a Middlesex county discus champion) spotted that Lillian, now aged 12, had a special talent for running. She took her to join London Olympiades, the leading all-female athletics club, which had a training base at Alperton, north-west London. Here she competed in relays and 100 and 150-yard sprints.

The following year, 1962, she began competing in the long jump and after training through that winter, improved markedly as both a sprinter and long jumper.

In 1963, aged 14, she won the junior long jump title at the All-England Schools Championships (now known as The English Schools Championships) with a leap of 17 ft 3 in (5.26 m), and then finished second (17 ft 5 3/4 in or 5.328 m) in the long jump at the Women's Amateur Athletic Association's national junior championships. She ended the season with victory in the long jump at the Southern Inter-Counties meeting, her leap of 17 ft 8 1/2 in (5.40 m) the best by a British junior girl that year.

Trained by her father George and inspired by an illustrious club-mate, international long jumper and pentathlete Mary Rand, she concentrated on the sprints from the 1964 season with an emphasis on strength work and with a view to eventually moving up from the short sprints to the 440 and 880 yards, where George felt sure her future lay. She made her debut over both 220 yds and 880 yds in 1964, winning both events in times of 26.2 and 2:30.8, respectively.

In 1965, aged 16, Board was a member of the London Olympiades squad that won the 4 × 100 m relay title at the Women's AAA junior championships. Later that year, she showed her versatility with a career best leap of 5.80 m in the Long Jump and indoor wins over 60 yards (7.2) and 300 yards (42.0). She also lowered her 100 y best time to 10.9 and her 220 y best to 24.7.

Due to age rules, Board was unable to make her debut at the 440 yds until April 1966 when, aged 17 and now a senior, she finished a close second in an inter-club meeting at Southall, London, in 58.1 seconds. She then ran 57.3 in the Southern Counties Championships, before taking fourth place in the Women's AAA senior 440 yds final in a time of 54.6, the fastest ever recorded by a 17-year-old in Europe. Meanwhile, she took a secretarial course at Chiswick Polytechnic after leaving school, and worked between training sessions as a typist.

== International success ==
=== 1966 season ===
Board's performances at 400 m in the 1966 season earned her a place in the England team for the Commonwealth Games held in Kingston, Jamaica, that August. Here, after winning her 400 m heat (54.7), Board finished fifth in the final in a time of 54.7 seconds, just outside her personal best. She was not chosen for the Great Britain team at the European Championships in Budapest, which were held from 30 August – 4 September. However, later in September, she made her Great Britain debut, achieving fourth in the 400 m (55.9) in a match against France in Lille.

=== 1967 season ===
Board became the national 440 yards champion after winning the British WAAA Championships title at the 1967 WAAA Championships.

Board announced her arrival onto the international scene when, at age 18, she won the 400 m race in a Commonwealth v USA match in Los Angeles, California on 9 July 1967. She came from last to first with a late surge and won in a time of 52.8 seconds, the second fastest ever recorded by a European woman. The race was broadcast live on British television and made her into a household name. This success marked a turning point in her career.

She followed this achievement with a run of four wins at 400 m in five international events, most notably securing the only victory for Britain's women (in a time of 53.7) in the 1967 European Cup final in Kyiv on 15 September. That season she also lowered her 200 m personal best to 24.6 and her 880 m best to 2.08.7. Following her successful season, she was chosen as Athlete of the Year by the Athletic Writers' Association.

=== 1968 season and Olympic Games ===
Board began the 1968 season by winning the 440-yard race at an inter-club meeting in Brighton, her time of 54.8 meeting the Olympic qualifying standard. She then rose to the top of the world rankings after winning over 400 m (53.5) at an international meeting in Moscow. However, at the Women's AAA championships in July, she declined to participate in the 400 m and instead decided to contest the 800 metres. Board won her heat (2.05.7), running a 2:02.0, the second fastest ever by a British woman, to finish 2nd to the reigning European 800 m champion, Vera Nikolic of Yugoslavia, whose time of 2:00.5 was a new world record.

She continued her preparations for Mexico with a personal best of 23.5 when winning the 200 m in a match against West Germany in August and taking the 400 m (53.0) against Poland in September. She also anchored a British relay team to a new 4 × 110 y world record (45.0) later that month.

She went into the 1968 Summer Olympics in Mexico City as favourite to win the 400 m gold medal. After finishing second in her 400 m heat (53.00), she won her semi-final with a personal best of 52.56. In the final on 16 October, she only took the lead about 100 m from the finish and maintained her advantage well down the home straight. She looked certain to win but was caught just before the line by Colette Besson of France and beaten into second place by 0.09 seconds. Although she placed second, her performance set a new UK record of 52.12.

=== 1969 season and European Championships ===
In 1969, Board began the season with a personal best 11.9 for 100 metres and a 52.9 contribution to a 4 × 400 metres world record (3:37.6), but in early July she strained ligaments in her back, forcing her to miss five weeks of the season. She returned in August with a 52.5 anchor leg in the 4 × 400 m relay to help Great Britain beat the USA in an international match at London's White City; and then win the 400 m (53.7) in a match against France, whose team included her previous Olympic competitor Colette Besson, in Middlesbrough.

However, her back was still painful, more so when she ran shorter distances, so she decided to go for the 800 metres at the 1969 European Athletics Championships in Athens that September. Still inexperienced at the longer event and ranked only 8th in Europe on her performances that season, she was not strongly favoured for 800 m gold. She won her heat (2:04.2) and then, two days later, in the final on 18 September, won by eight metres in a personal best time of 2:01.4, a new championship record. She was the first British woman to win this European title, the second being Lynsey Sharp in 2012.

Just two days later, 20 September, Board lined up for Great Britain in the 4 × 400 m relay. Running the last leg, she came from ten metres down entering the home straight to beat Besson, who was anchoring the French squad. Board both won gold for Britain and helped to set a new world record of 3:30.8. Having claimed two gold medals, she was named as 'Best Woman Athlete in the Games'. The relay team, featuring Board, Rosemary Stirling, Pat Lowe and Janet Simpson, was the first British team to win that title at the competition.

A further accolade came when she was appointed as a Member of the Order of the British Empire, for services to sport, in the 1970 New Year Honours. Known as the Golden Girl of British athletics for her blonde hair and medal success, Board had become a very popular public figure, earning herself another nickname: 'Britain's favourite girl'. In December 1969, she was the 'mystery runner' at the Nos Galan (New Year's Eve) festival, held annually in the Welsh village of Mountain Ash to commemorate the legendary Welsh runner, Guto Nyth Bran.

=== 1970 season ===
Board ran two-mile races early in the 1970 campaign, partly to build up stamina for the 800 m and partly with the aim of becoming the first athlete to represent Britain at all distances, the 1500 m being the only one missing from her collection. After running a 4:55.7 on her miling debut, she was selected for an international mile race in Rome on 16 May. Here she improved her personal best to 4:44.6, finishing second to a former mile world record holder, Paola Pigni of Italy. Her time moved her to No 2 in the UK all-time lists for the women's mile, behind former world record holder at the distance, Anne Smith.

== Cancer and early death ==
=== Initial health problems ===
Soon after the mile race in Rome, she began to suffer from stomach upsets. These were diagnosed as a virus and she was prescribed pills. She continued to feel unwell but still managed to contribute a 2:07.0 leg to a 4 × 800 m world record on 13 June in Edinburgh. She ran 2:06.8 six days later when winning her 800 m heat at the Women's AAA championships at Crystal Palace, London, despite being doubled up in pain before the race. Pale and underweight, she then finished a tired third (2:05.1) in the 800 m final on 20 June.

=== Diagnosis and treatment ===
That 800 m final proved to be her last race. X-rays revealed inflammation of the bladder and her condition was initially diagnosed as Crohn's disease, forcing her to halt training and ruling her out of July's Commonwealth Games in Edinburgh. However, after further X-rays, tests and two biopsies she was correctly diagnosed with terminal colorectal cancer (or bowel cancer) in September 1970. An exploratory operation at St Mark's Hospital, London, on 8 October, revealed that the cancer had spread to her stomach and she was given two months to live.

Seeking a cure, she travelled in November 1970 to the village of Rottach-Egern, in the Bavarian Alps near Munich, West Germany, to be treated by the controversial physician Dr Josef Issels at his Ringberg Cancer Clinic. Adhering to his belief in non-mainstream treatments, she was placed on a strict diet of healthy food and with spring water and herbal tea as her only drinks. She then had her tonsils and two front teeth removed as Issels believed they helped spread infection.

Her condition worsened and she was moved to an intensive care unit at the clinic on 11 December. The following day, she underwent an operation to drain water from her abdomen.

=== Early death ===
She was transferred to the LMU Klinikum on 21 December 1970, with suspected peritonitis. She was found not to have peritonitis but still needed to undergo an operation to remove a stomach blockage. This was done on 23 December. She recovered from the after-effects of the operation, but on 24 December she lapsed into a coma from which she would not emerge. She died in Munich two days later, aged 22. She was cremated at Putney Vale Crematorium on 1 January 1971.

A memorial service was held for her at St Paul's Cathedral, London, on 21 January 1971, and she is commemorated in Munich with an avenue bearing her name that leads to the Munich Olympic Stadium. A biography entitled simply Lillian was published by her fiancé, David Emery, in 1971.

== Honours and awards ==
- Voted 'Sportswoman of the Year' for 1968 by the Sports Journalists' Association.
- Named 'Best Woman Athlete in the Games' at the 1969 European Championships in Athletics.
- Appointed Member of the Order of the British Empire (MBE) in the New Year's Honours List, 1970 for services to athletics.
- Voted 'Sportswoman of the Year' for 1970 by readers of the Daily Express newspaper.
- British athlete Rebecca Lyne dedicated the bronze medal she won in the 800 m at the 2006 European Athletics Championships to Lillian Board.
- The footway from the Munich Olympic Stadium to the subway station was renamed as the Lillian-Board-Weg.
- Lilian Board Way, Greenford, in her hometown of Ealing, bears her name. Due to an administrative error, the spelling of her first name was spelt incorrectly.
- The Lillian Board Trophy, a memorial trophy provided by Irene Board and by Dame Marea Hartman, Chairwoman of the Woman's Commission of the IAAF and of the Women's AAA following Board's death is awarded each year for outstanding fundraising for cancer.

== Achievements ==
Year	Competition	Venue	Position	Event	Notes
1967	European Cup	Kyiv, Soviet Union	1st	400 m	53.7
1968	Summer Olympics	Mexico City, Mexico	2nd	400 m	UK record (52.12)
1969	European Championships	Athens, Greece	1st	800 metres	Championship record (2:01.4)
1969	European Championships	Athens, Greece	1st	4 × 400 metres	World record (3:30.8)

== National titles and records ==
- Won six titles at the WAAA's Championships, including the 440 yds title in 1967.
- Set 11 UK records, including a 400 m record of 52.12 in 1968.
- Helped set four relay world records (at 4 × 110 yds, 4 × 400 m (twice) and 4 × 800 m) between September 1968 and June 1970, running the anchor/last leg each time.

== Personal bests ==
Event	Mark	Year
100 metres	11.9	1969
200 metres	23.42	1968
400 metres	52.12	1968
800 metres	2:01.4	1969
Mile run	4:44.6	1970
Long jump	5.80 m	1965

She only competed twice in the mile run and ceased competing in the long jump in 1967.

== Personal life ==
Board was engaged to sports journalist David Emery at the time of her death. Emery was at her side throughout her illness. He subsequently married her twin sister Irene.

A talented dressmaker and designer, Board often made her own clothes, including a pink coat she wore to receive the MBE from Queen Elizabeth II in January 1970.

She was the only female panellist on the first nationwide edition of BBC TV's quiz show A Question of Sport, broadcast on 5 January 1970. The other panellists were footballers George Best and Tom Finney and cricketer Ray Illingworth (the team captains were boxer Henry Cooper and rugby player Cliff Morgan, and the presenter was David Vine.) The recording of this historic edition of one of television's most popular and durable programmes (now in its 54th year) is missing from the BBC archives.

== Notes ==
- David Emery, (1971). Lillian, Hodder & Stoughton, (ISBN 0-340-15695-3)
- Mel Watman, (2006). All-time Greats of British Athletics, (pp. 103–106), Sportsbooks Ltd.,(ISBN 1899807446)
