= Della Pascoe =

British sprinter (1949–2023)

Della Pascoe née James
Personal information
- Nationality: British (English)
- Born: 28 March 1949 Portsmouth, England
- Died: 22 June 2023 (aged 74)
- Height: 170 cm (5 ft 7 in)
- Weight: 56 kg (123 lb)

Sport
- Sport: Athletics
- Event: Sprinting
- Club: London Olympiades

Della Patricia Pascoe (née James; 28 March 1949 – 22 June 2023) was a British international sprinter, who competed at the 1968 Summer Olympics.

== Biography ==
James finished third behind Johanna Cornelissen in the 100 yards event at the 1967 WAAA Championships.

At the 1968 Olympic Games in Mexico City, she represented Great Britain in the women's 100 metres. James later represented England in the 100 metres and 200 metres, at the 1970 British Commonwealth Games in Edinburgh, Scotland.

Shortly after the 1970 Games, James married hurdler Alan Pascoe and competed under her married name thereafter As Pascoe she became the national 100 metres champion after winning the British WAAA Championships title at the 1972 WAAA Championships.

Pascoe died from complications of Parkinson's disease on 22 June 2023, at the age of 74. Della and Alan had two children, Lucy & Daniel
