= Frances Slaap =

British high jumper

Personal information
- Nationality: British (English)
- Born: 25 June 1941 (age 85) Perivale, England

Sport
- Sport: Athletics
- Event: High jump
- Club: Ruislip & Northwood AC

Frances Mary Slaap (born 25 June 1941) is a British retired athlete who competed in the women's high jump at the 1960 Summer Olympics and the 1964 Summer Olympics.

== Biography ==
Slaap attended Frays College and competed for the Ruislip Athletic Club, where she was trained by Dorothy Tyler-Odam. She won the All-England Schools title in 1960.

At the 1960 Olympic Games in Rome, she represented Great Britain in the high jump competition finishing equal 6th. Slaap also represented England in the 80 metres hurdles and high jump at the 1962 British Empire and Commonwealth Games in Perth, Western Australia.

Slaap finished second behind Iolanda Balaș in the high jump event at the 1962 WAAA Championships and by virtue of being the best placed British athlete was considered the national high jump champion.

Slaap taught biology at a Hertfordshire school but gave up teaching in 1964, which helped her achove considerable success during the year. On 4 July 1964 she won the WAAA title outright at the 1964 WAAA Championships, breaking the English high jump record at White City, jumping 5 ft 8.5in, and equalling the British record. On Saturday 15 August 1964, she jumped 5 ft 9in at White City, in a Britain versus Poland competition, taking the British record, which had stood since 1956. At Portsmouth she jumped 5 ft 9.25in, increasing the British record on Saturday 26 September 1964. At the same event at Alexandra Park, Portsmouth, Mary Rand also unofficially broke the women's long jump world record, and was the first woman to jump 22 ft, but she had a back wind.

The highlight however was on 15 October 1964 in the Olympic high jump final, where she came 6th, being the only British woman in the final.

A third WAAA title was won at the 1965 WAAA Championships.

Slaap emigrated to Australia in December 1966 after not being picked for the England Commonwealth or the British European team. She looked to compete for the Australian team in the 1968 Summer Olympics. She moved to Brisbane on 14 December 1966 to work for an airline.

She moved back to England for three months in 1968 in an attempt to get into the British team for the upcoming 1968 Summer Olympics and finished third behind Barbara Inkpen at the 1969 WAAA Championships.

Records
Preceded by (Northern Ireland) Thelma Hopkins	Women's High Jump British Record Holder; 15 August 1964 – 19 April 1969	Succeeded by (England) Barbara Inkpen
