= Ann O'Brien (runner) =

Irish runner

Personal information
- Born: May 9, 1943
- Height: 1.57 m (5 ft 2 in)
- Weight: 54 kg (119 lb)

Sport
- Sport: Running
- Event: 1500 meters

Ann O'Brien (later Cummins) was an Irish runner who held top marks in the 10,000 metres during the period before the event was formally recognized for women by the international governing body for athletics (then the IAAF, now World Athletics).

== Career ==
O’Brien recorded the women’s world best for the 10,000 m on 26 March 1967 with 36:06.4 at Gormanston, Ireland.

Note: The IAAF (now World Athletics) did not recognize the 10,000 m for record purposes by women until 1981.

O'Brien also achieved the 1 hour distance world record twice:

- 3 October 1965 with 14,141 m
- 10 October 1965 with 14,438 m

O’Brien won a team silver at the 1967 International Cross-Country Championships (representing Ireland) and four national titles between 1968–71. O'Brien was also a very successful competitor at the Irish Athletics Championships winning 19 titles in all. In addition representing Ireland, she was also a competitor in the 1500 m at the 1969 European Championships, finishing 11th in her heat.

Note: This was the first European Championship that the women had the 1500 m in their program and was the longest distance they could compete at.

O'Brien represented the club Clonliffe Harriers and with them won the following Irish national titles at :

- Mile 1966-68, 1500 m 1969-71
- 880 y in 1968, 800 m in 1969
- 440 y in 1967
