= Brenda Bedford =

British shot putter and discus thrower

Personal information
- Nationality: British (English)
- Born: 4 September 1937 (age 88) Battersea, London, England

Sport
- Sport: Athletics
- Event: Discus / Shot put
- Club: Mitcham AC; Hercules AC

Brenda Rose Bedford (née Sawyer) (born 4 September 1937), is a female former athlete who competed for England.

== Biography ==
Bedford finished third behind Suzanne Allday in the discus throw event at the 1961 WAAA Championships.

Bedford became the national shot put champion after winning the British WAAA Championships title and also finished second behind Rosemary Payne in the discus event at the 1966 WAAA Championships. She then represented England in the discus and shot put, at the 1966 British Empire and Commonwealth Games in Kingston, Jamaica.

Bedford retained her national shot put title at the 1967 WAAA Championships; a title she regained at the 1969 WAAA Championships.

She later competed at both the 1970 British Commonwealth Games in Edinburgh, Scotland and the 1974 British Commonwealth Games at Christchurch, New Zealand. In between the Games, Bedford won another WAAA shot put title at the 1973 WAAA Championships and went on to claim two more in 1975 and 1977.

In addition she took part in the 1968 European Indoor Games, in Madrid and at the 1969 European Athletics Championships, in Athens and was six times English champion (1966, 1967, 1969, 1973, 1975, 1977) and five times English indoor champion (1967, 1969, 1971, 1973, 1975).
