= Sheila Sherwood =

English long jumper (born 1945)

Sheila Sherwood née Parkin
Personal information
- Nationality: British (English)
- Born: 22 October 1945 (age 80) Sheffield, England
- Height: 168 cm (5 ft 6 in)
- Weight: 61 kg (134 lb)

Sport
- Sport: Athletics
- Event: Long jump
- Club: Hallamshire Harriers; Sheffield City AC
Medal record
Women's Athletics
Representing Great Britain
Olympic Games
| Silver medal – second place | 1968 Mexico City | Long jump |
Summer Universiade
| Gold medal – first place | 1967 Tokyo | Long jump |
Representing England
Commonwealth Games
| Gold medal – first place | 1970 Edinburgh | Long jump |
| Silver medal – second place | 1966 Kingston | Long jump |

Sheila Hilary Sherwood née Parkin (22 October 1945) is a former international long jumper who won a silver medal at the 1968 Summer Olympics in Mexico, and a gold medal at the 1970 British Commonwealth Games in Edinburgh. She competed in three consecutive Summer Olympic Games (1964, 1968 and 1972) and had a career best distance of 6.73 metres.

== Biography ==
As a child, her parents were caretaker and head cook at St Thomas More School in nearby Grenoside. Sherwood attended Yew Lane Secondary Modern, where at the age of fifteen she was appointed as Head-Girl. After a successful set of O-Level results, she transferred to nearby Ecclesfield Grammar School to study for her A-Levels.

Parkin first came to prominence as an athlete as a 16-year-old as a member of the Sheffield-based Sheffield United Harriers athletic club. She created an English Schools long jump record in the summer of 1962. On the strength of this she was selected to represent Great Britain against Poland in August 1962 where she finished second behind former world record holder Elzbieta Krzensinska by just 2 cm.

This performance started her long and distinguished career as an international long jumper, as it resulted in selection for the 1962 European championships in Belgrade, where she finished 12th, and then representing England in the long jump at the 1962 Commonwealth Games in Perth, Western Australia, where she achieved 5th position.

Sherwood's early career saw only a slight improvement in her jumping, and she was eclipsed by fellow British jumper Mary Rand on many occasions, such as finishing second behind her at the 1963 WAAA Championships and 1964 WAAA Championships.

At the 1964 Olympic Games in Tokyo, she represented Great Britain, finishing 13th behind gold medal winner Mary Rand. However, it was in Tokyo that Sheila met British hurdler John Sherwood and a romance began.

Parkin's relationship with Sherwood coincided with improvement in her jumping performances. She took the silver medal at the 1966 Commonwealth Games in Kingston, Jamaica, behind Rand. Parkin married John Sherwood in 1968 and competed under her married name thereafter.

Shortly after her marriage Sherwood became the national long jump champion after winning the British WAAA Championships at the 1968 WAAA Championships and later in October at the 1968 Olympic Games in Mexico City, she represented Great Britain, where she took the silver medal behind the Romanian Viorica Viscopoleanu with a personal best leap of 6.68 metres. Sherwood retained her national long jump title at the 1969 WAAA Championships.

Sherwood took the gold medal at the 1970 Commonwealth Games in Edinburgh with a career best jump of 6.73 metres and finished fourth at the 1971 European Championships in Helsinki. She regained her WAAA title in 1971 but in her latter years in the sport she was hindered by back problems. Despite this she was selected for the 1972 Olympic Games in Munich where she finished a commendable ninth. Her career as an international long jumper came to a conclusion at the 1974 Commonwealth Games in Auckland where she took seventh place.

== Retirement and personal life ==
In the mid-1970s Sherwood and her husband helped form the breakaway Sheffield Athletic Club, which then amalgamated with Sheffield United Harriers to form Sheffield City Athletic Club. The club later changed its name to the City of Sheffield Athletic Club.

Sherwood is the mother of British international tennis player David Sherwood who was born in 1980. After retiring from athletics she continued to work as a physical education teacher at Myers Grove Comprehensive School in Sheffield.
