= Maureen Tranter =

British sprinter

Personal information
- Nationality: British (English)
- Born: 7 May 1947 (age 79) Bilston, Wolverhampton, England
- Height: 173 cm (5 ft 8 in)
- Weight: 66 kg (146 lb)

Sport
- Sport: Athletics
- Event: Sprinting
- Club: Bilston AC / WBAC
Medal record
Athletics
Representing England
British Empire & Commonwealth Games
Silver medal – second place	1966 Kingston	4 x 110 yards relay

Maureen Dorothy Tranter married name Maureen Taylor, (born 7 May 1947) is a British retired sprinter, who competed at the 1968 Summer Olympics.

== Biography ==
Tranter finished second behind Janet Simpson in the 220 yards event at both the 1965 WAAA Championships and 1966 WAAA Championships. She also finished second behind Daphne Slater in the 100 yards in 1966.

Tranter represented the England team and won a silver medal in the 4 x 110 yards relay, at the 1966 British Empire and Commonwealth Games in Kingston, Jamaica.

Although she finished second behind Johanna Cornelissen at the 1967 WAAA Championships, she was the highest placed British athlete and therefore was classed as the national 220 yards champion.

After another second place finish at the 1968 WAAA Championships behind Val Peat, she represented Great Britain in the women's 200 metres at the 1968 Olympic Games in Mexico City.

Two years later she represented England in the 200 and 400 metres at the 1970 British Commonwealth Games in Edinburgh, Scotland.
