= Rita Ridley =

English runner (1946–2013)

Personal information
- Born: Rita Lincoln; 4 November 1946 Hackney, London, England
- Died: 12 February 2013 (aged 66)

Sport
- Sport: Athletics
- Event: middle-distance
- Club: Essex Ladies Athletics Club
Medal record
Women's athletics
Representing England
British Commonwealth Games
Gold medal – first place	1970 Edinburgh	1500 m

Rita Ridley (née Lincoln; 4 November 1946 – 12 February 2013) was an English middle- and long-distance runner.

== Biography ==
Lincoln started in athletics at school in Essex with her twin sister Iris. On 3 July at the 1965 WAAA Championships, aged 18, she finished second to Joyce Smith in the mile race at the WAAA Championships.

The following year Lincoln became the national mile champion after winning the British WAAA Championships title at the 1966 WAAA Championships, in a championship record time of 4:47.9. She retained the national mile title at the 1967 WAAA Championships and the 1968 WAAA Championships (although the mile was now called the 1500 metres.

Lincoln married Clive Ridley in early 1969 and competed under her married name thereafter. Ridley then won further WAA titles at both the 1970 WAAA Championships and 1971 WAAA Championships.

She won the national cross country championships in 1969, 1970, 1971, 1972 and 1974. In 1974 she also won the prestigious Cinque Mulini Cross country and gained a bronze medal in the IAAF World Cross Country Championships.

In 1969, she achieved a British record time of 4:15.9 in the 1500 m and she set a new record of 4:15.4 in 1970 and then 4:14.3 and 4:12.65 in 1971. In December 1968 she was the first British woman to break 10 minutes in the 3000 metres with a time of 9:59.6.

She represented England and won the gold medal in the 1,500 metres at the 1970 Commonwealth Games in Edinburgh. In a fiercely contested race, New Zealand's Sylvia Potts tripped and fell just one metre from the finish line, with Ridley avoiding the falling athlete on her outside, to take the title.

Rita trained as a PE teacher at All Saints College in North London and gained a BEd with Hons from London University at All Saints in 1980. Ridley died of cancer at the age of 66 in 2013.
