= Dorothy Shirley =

British athlete (born 1939)

Dorothy Emerson (née Shirley)
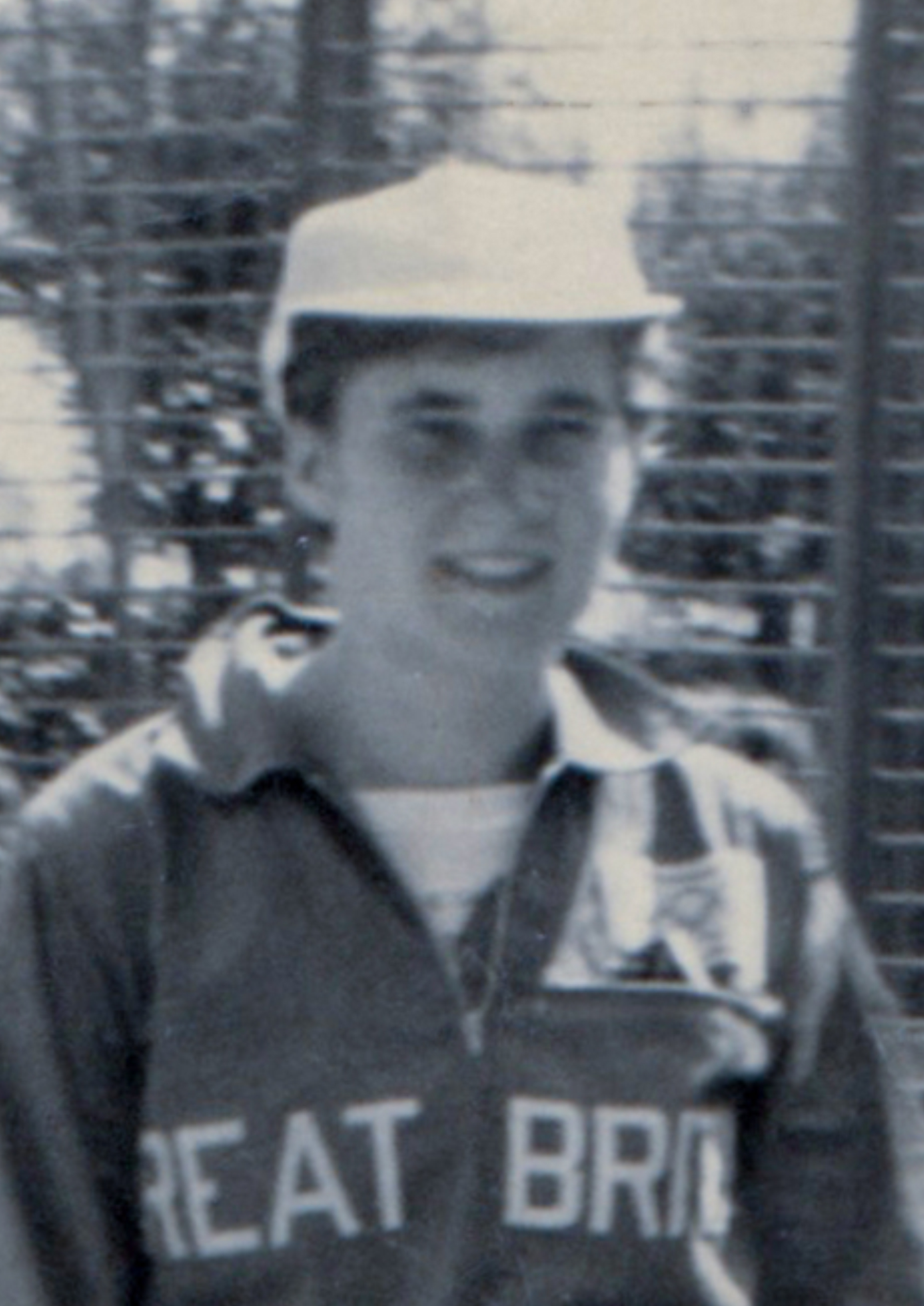
- Dorothy Shirley, in 1960

Personal information
- Nationality: British (English)
- Born: 15 May 1939 (age 87) Manchester, England
- Height: 164 cm (5 ft 5 in)
- Weight: 56 kg (123 lb)

Sport
- Sport: Athletics
- Event: high jump
- Club: Salford Harriers; Spartan LAC
Medal record
Women's athletics
Representing Great Britain
Olympic Games
Silver medal – second place	1960 Rome	High jump
European Championships
Bronze medal – third place	1958 Stockholm	High jump
Representing England
British Empire & Commonwealth Games
Silver medal – second place	1966 Kingston	high jump

Dorothy Ada Emerson (née Shirley) (born 15 May 1939) is a former British athlete, who mainly competed in the women's high jump event.

== Biography ==
Shirley represented England in the high jump at the 1958 British Empire and Commonwealth Games in Cardiff, Wales.

Shirley became the national high jump champion after winning the British WAAA Championships title at the 1960 WAAA Championships. Shortly afterwards Shirley competed for Great Britain in the 1960 Summer Olympics held in Rome, Italy, where she won the silver medal in the high jump jointly with Jarosława Jóźwiakowska. It was the fifth straight silver medal for Britain in this event.

After successfully retaining her national title at the 1961 WAAA Championships she competed for England in the high jump at the 1962 British Empire and Commonwealth Games in Perth, Western Australia.

After winning the British WAAA title at the 1966 WAAA Championships, Shirley won a silver medal at the 1966 British Empire and Commonwealth Games in Kingston, Jamaica

Shirley continued to perform at the highest level in the high jump and won two more WAAA titles in 1968 and 1970 respectively. A fourth consecutive Games appearance came in 1970 during the 1970 British Commonwealth Games in Edinburgh.

Shirley became a teacher and worked as a PE teacher at Bentham Grammar School in the West Riding of Yorkshire in the early 1970s. Later, she taught as a Primary School Teacher at St. Michael's Primary School in Alkrington, Middleton.
