= Rosemary Payne =

British discus thrower (1933–2026)

Personal information
- Nationality: British (Scottish)
- Born: 19 May 1933 Kelso, Scottish Borders, Scotland
- Died: November 2026 (aged 93)
- Height: 174 cm (5 ft 9 in)
- Weight: 76 kg (168 lb)

Sport
- Sport: Athletics
- Event: Discus
- Club: Lozells Harriers, Birmingham; Edinburgh Southern Harriers
Medal record
Women's Athletics
Representing Scotland
Commonwealth Games
Gold medal – first place	1970 Edinburgh	Discus Throw
Silver medal – second place	1974 Christchurch	Discus Throw

Christine Rosemary Payne (née Charters; 19 May 1933 – November 2026) was a British discus thrower. She represented Great Britain at the 1972 Summer Olympics in Munich and won the gold medal for Scotland at the 1970 Commonwealth Games.

== Biography ==
Charters was born in Kelso, Scottish Borders, on 19 May 1933. She attended Kelso High School and the University of Edinburgh, where she completed a teaching degree.

At the 1958 British Empire and Commonwealth Games, Charters represented Scotland in the women's discus throw finishing in 10th place. She met hammer thrower Howard Payne at the Games and they married in Birmingham on 5 February 1960. Charters competed under her married name of Payne thereafter.

Payne finished second behind Kriemhild Limberg in the discus throw event at the 1964 WAAA Championships but by virtue of being the best placed British athlete she became the national discus champion. Payne regained her discus title at the 1966 WAAA Championships and was classified British champion every year from 1964 to 1974.

At the age of 39 she competed in the 1972 Olympics. She ranked tenth in the qualification round with a distance of 55.56 m, in the final she finished 12th with a throw of 56.50 m. Her personal best of 58.02 m dates from the same year 1972.

At age 41, she took a silver medal in the 1974 Commonwealth Games. Also in 1974, she served as the British Junior Team Manager, supervising youngsters including Steve Cram, Fatima Whitbread, Colin Jackson and Steve Backley.

She competed in the 1975 World Masters Athletics Championships, showing her athletic versatility by winning gold in not only the discus and shot put throwing events, but also in the 100 metres and high jump.

After 1978, she took a break from competing, to return ten years later at the European Veterans Championships, adding the triple jump to her repertoire. Her British W55 record of 9.12 m still stands. In all she amassed 19 British age group records, including a complete sweep of Discus records from age 35 to 80, excepting the W50 division that fell during the years she was not competing. As of the start of 2014, she held five world records.

Payne died in November 2026, aged 93.

== Sources ==
- sports-reference
