= 1951 WAAA Championships =

British athletics event

- Dates: 7 July
- Host city: London
- Venue: White City Stadium
- Level: Senior
- Type: Outdoor

The 1951 WAAA Championships were the national track and field championships for women in the United Kingdom.

The event was held at White City Stadium in London on 7 July 1951.

== Results ==
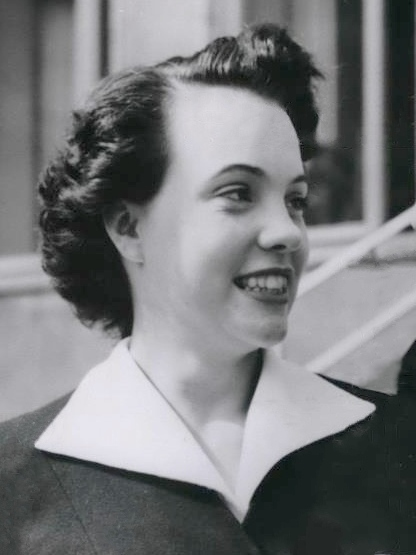
June Foulds retained her 100 metres title

| Event | Gold | | Silver | | Bronze | |
|---|---|---|---|---|---|---|
| 100 metres | June Foulds | 12.3 | Muriel Pletts | 12.5 | Anne Pashley | 12.5 |
| 200 metres | Sylvia Cheeseman | 25.0 | Dorothy Hall | 25.2 | Muriel Pletts | 26.3 |
| 400 metres | Valerie Ball | 58.2 | Margaret Taylor | 59.5 | Maureen Attwater | 60.6 |
| 800 metres | Nellie Batson | 2:18.4 | Enid Harding | 2:20.2 | Margaret Richards | 2:24.2 |
| 1 mile | Hazel Needham | 5:23.4 | Joan Dryden | 5:24.3 | Avery Gibson | 5:24.6 |
| 80 metres hurdles | Maureen Dyson | 11.7 | Jean Desforges | 11.8e | Sheila Pratt | |
| High jump | Sheila Lerwill | 1.718 WR | Dorothy Tyler | 1.600 | Ursula Hynes | 1.524 |
| Long jump | Dorothy Tyler | 5.58 | Shirley Cawley | 5.50 | (Scotland) Margaret Erskine | 5.40 |
| Shot put | Bevis Shergold | 11.78 | Joan Linsell | 11.49 | Suzanne Farmer | 10.43 |
| Discus throw | Bevis Shergold | 39.88 NR | Suzanne Farmer | 35.80 | Joan Linsell | 35.63 |
| Javelin | Diane Coates | 38.03 | Ann Dukes | 33.42 | Chreena MacDonald | 32.38 |
| Pentathlon + | Dorothy Tyler | 3224 NR | Bertha Crowther | 2948 (3810) | Marie Bridgford | 2877 (3768) |
| 1600 metres walk | Joyce Heath | 7:50.0 | Leila Deas | 7:59.0 | Brenda Stevenson | |

+ Held on 9 September at Ilford

== See also ==
- 1951 AAA Championships
