= 1939 WAAA Championships =

British athletics event

- Dates: 22 July
- Host city: London
- Venue: White City Stadium
- Level: Senior
- Type: Outdoor

The 1939 WAAA Championships were the national track and field championships for women in the United Kingdom.

The event was held at White City Stadium, London, on 22 July 1939. The Championships would not be held again until 1945 due to World War II.

== Results ==
Event	Gold		Silver		Bronze	
60 metres	Betty Lock	7.6	Dorothy Marshall	7.8	Muriel Turner	
100 metres	Betty Lock	12.4	Mary Holloway	½ yard	Dorothy Saunders	1 yard
200 metres	Lillian Chalmers	25.6w	Marjorie Smith	2½ yards	Dorothy Saunders	2 yards
400 metres	Lillian Chalmers	59.5	Olive Hall	15 yards	Beryl Hill	2 yards
800 metres	Olive Hall	2:21.0	Doris Harris	2:25.5	Miriam Clarke	2:27.4
1 mile	Evelyne Forster	5:15.3 WR	Doris Harris	5:36.0	Miriam Clarke	5:40.6
80 metres hurdles	Kate Roberston	12.4	Dorothy Odam	4 feet	Ethel Raby	1 yard
High jump	Dorothy Odam	1.651	Dora Gardner	1.575	Barbara Lovelock; Dorothy Cosnett	1.524; 1.524
Long jump	Ethel Raby	5.64	Vedder Schenck	5.51	Helene Mayer	5.48
Shot put	Bevis Reid	11.42	Kathleen Tilley	10.37	Ruby Davis	9.54
Discus throw	Bevis Reid	33.85	Kathleen Tilley	33.34	Katharine Connal	29.11
Javelin	Katharine Connal	34.98	Bevis Reid	33.65	Doris Endruweit	27.83
1600 metres walk	Florence Pengelly	8:19.9	Mary Harrington	8:21.4	Betty Jones	8:34.2

== See also ==
- 1939 AAA Championships
