= 1947 WAAA Championships =

British athletics event

- Dates: 2 August
- Host city: Chiswick, London
- Venue: Polytechnic Stadium
- Level: Senior
- Type: Outdoor

The 1947 WAAA Championships were the national track and field championships for women in the United Kingdom.

The event was held at Polytechnic Stadium in Chiswick, London, on 2 August 1947.

== Results ==
Event	Gold		Silver		Bronze	
60 metres	Irene Royse	7.9	Margaret Walker	8.0	Hazel Batson	8.1
100 metres	Winifred Jordan	12.1	Maureen Gardner	12.1	Sylvia Cheeseman	12.2
200 metres	Sylvia Cheeseman	25.0	Winifred Jordan	25.0?	Margaret Walker	
400 metres	Joan Upton	61.6	Joyce Heath	62.2	Rose Eaton	62.5
800 metres	Nellie Batson	2:23.1	Joyce Heath	2:24.5	Phyllis Richards	2:25.8
1 mile	Nellie Batson	5:37.6	Brenda Harris	5:41.5	Ruby Wright	5:41.9
80 metres hurdles	Maureen Gardner	11.5 NR	Jean Desforges	12.2	Bertha Crowther	12.6
High jump	Gladys Young	1.549	Bertha Crowther	1.499	Sheila Alexander	1.499
Long jump	Kathleen Duffy	5.26	Joan Shepherd	5.12	Vedder Schenck	4.75
Shot put	Bevis Reid	11.03	Margaret Lucas	10.30	Kathleen Dyer	10.23
Discus throw	Margaret Lucas	36.40 NR	Bevis Reid	36.17	(Czechoslovakia) Milena Taiblová	35.15
Javelin	(Czechoslovakia) Milena Taiblová	31.50	Margaret Lasbrey	29.64	Dora Chandler (Endruweit)	28.75
1600 metres walk	Joan Riddington	8:36.4	Margaret Brittain	8:37.7	Beryl Day	8:40.0

== See also ==
- 1947 AAA Championships
