= 1950 WAAA Championships =

British athletics event

- Dates: 8 July
- Host city: London
- Venue: White City Stadium
- Level: Senior
- Type: Outdoor

The 1950 WAAA Championships were the national track and field championships for women in the United Kingdom.

The event was held at White City Stadium, London, on 8 July 1950.

The 60 metres sprint was held for the last time.

== Results ==
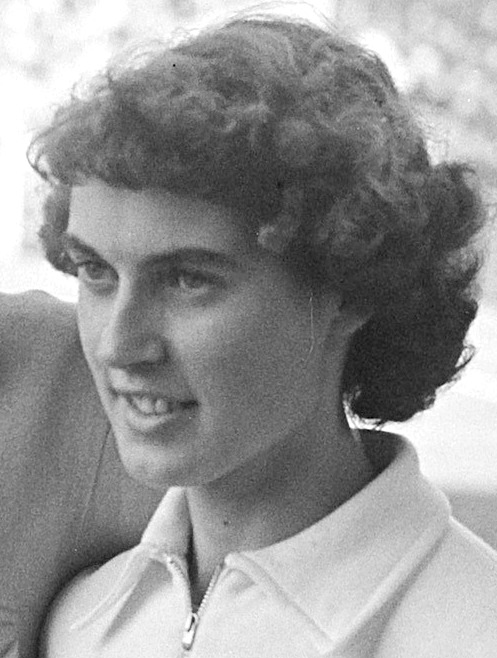
Dorothy Hall won the 200 metres

Event	Gold		Silver		Bronze	
60 metres	(Scotland) Quita Shivas	7.8	June Foulds	7.8	Doris Batter	7.9
100 metres	June Foulds	12.6	(Scotland) Quita Shivas	12.8	Barbara Foster	13.0
200 metres	Dorothy Hall	25.2	Sylvia Cheeseman	25.3	Margaret Brian	25.3
400 metres	Valerie Ball	57.5	Margaret Taylor	59.0	Pamela Germain	59.2
800 metres	Margaret Hume	2:20.5	Mary Webster	2:21.6	Enid Harding	2:21.8
1 mile	Joyce Heath	5:25.8	Hazel Needham	5:26.0	Joan Dryden	5:27.0
80 metres hurdles	Maureen Dyson	11.6	Jean Desforges	11.6	Sheila Pratt	11.9
High jump	Sheila Alexander	1.626	Dorothy Tyler	1.600	Joan Cowan	1.575
Long jump	(Scotland) Margaret Erskine	5.45	Bertha Crowther	5.43	Val Webster	5.31
Shot put	Joan Linsell	11.07	Kathleen Dyer	10.29	Josephine Page	10.01
Discus throw	Joyce Smith	33.04	Sylvia Needham	32.44	Gwen Buddle	32.18
Javelin	Diane Coates	39.06	Gladys Clarke	31.50	Chreena MacDonald	31.22
Pentathlon +	Bertha Crowther	2949 (3829)	Paddy Gunn	2762 (3712)	Sheila Pratt	2455 (3462)
1600 metres walk	Joyce Heath	8:17.0	Angela Douglas		Margaret Brittain	

+ Held on 27 July at Alperton

== See also ==
- 1950 AAA Championships
