= 1952 WAAA Championships =

British athletics event

- Dates: 14 June
- Host city: London
- Venue: White City Stadium
- Level: Senior
- Type: Outdoor

The 1952 WAAA Championships were the national track and field championships for women in the United Kingdom.

The event was held at White City Stadium, London, on 14 June 1952.

== Results ==
Event	Gold		Silver		Bronze	
100 yards	Heather Armitage	10.9w	(Scotland) Quita Shivas	11.1w	June Foulds	11.1w
220 yards	Sylvia Cheeseman	25.0	Shirley Hampton	25.4	Ann Johnson	25.6
440 yards	Valerie Ball	59.3	Betty Loakes	59.5	Margaret Taylor	60.0
880 yards	Margaret Taylor	2:17.5	Enid Harding	2:17.6	Phyllis Green	2:17.8
1 mile	Anne Oliver	5:11.0 WR	Hazel Needham	5:12.6	Iris Williams	5:28.8
80 metres hurdles	Jean Desforges	11.4	Pamela Seaborne	11.5	Dorothy Harper	11.7
High jump	Dorothy Tyler	1.651	Sheila Lerwill	1.626	(Northern Ireland) Thelma Hopkins	1.626
Long jump	Shirley Cawley	5.61	Constance Willoughby	5.42	Dorothy Tyler	5.23
Shot put	Joan Linsell	12.10	Bevis Shergold	12.01	Suzanne Farmer	11.35
Discus throw	Suzanne Farmer	39.33	Bevis Shergold	38.50	Maya Giri	36.93
Javelin	Diane Coates	45.30 NR	Ann Dukes	33.04	Muriel Hosking	32.87
Pentathlon +	Sheila Sewell (Pratt)	2544 (3514)	Marie Bridgford	2420 (3445)	Brenda Murfitt	2323 (3399)
1 mile walk	Beryl Day	7:58.2	Sheila Martin	8:05.7	Joyce Heath	8:26.0

+ Held on 6 September at Ilford

== See also ==
- 1952 AAA Championships
