= 1938 WAAA Championships =

British athletics event

- Dates: 2 July
- Host city: London
- Venue: White City Stadium
- Level: Senior
- Type: Outdoor

The 1938 WAAA Championships were the national track and field championships for women in the United Kingdom.

The event was held at White City Stadium, London, on 2 July 1938.

== Results ==
Event	Gold		Silver		Bronze	
60 metres	Betty Lock	7.6	Marjorie Smith	2½ yards	Dorothy Marshall	1 yard
100 metres	Betty Lock	12.2	Dorothy Saunders	1 yard	Audrey Brown	2 yards
200 metres	Dorothy Saunders	25.0	Lillian Chalmers	2 yards	Audrey Brown	3 yards
400 metres	Olive Hall	60.0	Betty Walters	6 yards	Marie Sole	4 yard
800 metres	Nellie Halstead	2:20.4	Olive Hall	1 yard	Doris Harris (Roden)	15 yards
1 mile	Doris Harris (Roden)	5:29.4	Miriam Clarke	20 yards	Nellie Halstead	30 yards
80 metres hurdles	Kate Robertson	12.2	Evelyn Matthews	1 yard	Linda Whitman	1½ yards
High jump	Dorothy Odam	1.575	Dora Gardner	1.575	Dorothy Cosnett	1.549
Long jump	Ethel Raby	5.40	Vedder Schenck	5.25	Alice Flack	5.17
Shot put	Bevis Reid	11.60 NR	Kathleen Tilley	10.63	Muriel Smith	9.66
Discus throw	Bevis Reid	35.42 NR	Kathleen Tilley	30.66	Katharine Connal	29.70
Javelin	Katharine Connal	34.69	Bevis Reid	30.92	Dorothy Hewitt	30.64
1600 metres walk	Evelyn Webb	8:39.0	Mary Harrington		D. Cooper	

== See also ==
- 1938 AAA Championships
