= 1949 WAAA Championships =

British athletics event

- Dates: 9 July
- Host city: London
- Venue: White City Stadium
- Level: Senior
- Type: Outdoor

The 1949 WAAA Championships were the national track and field championships for women in the United Kingdom.

The event was held at White City Stadium, London, on 9 July 1949.

The Pentathlon was added to the AAA Championships for the first time but was not held on the same date.

== Results ==
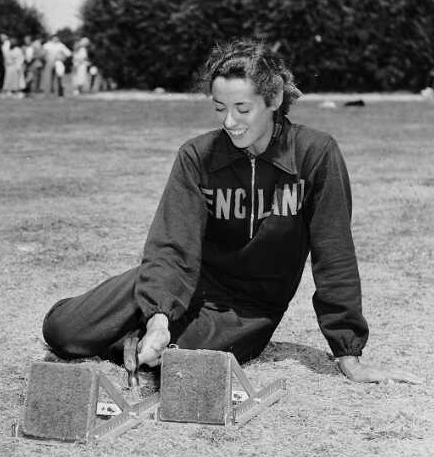
Sylvia Cheeseman won her fourth consecutive 200 metres title

Event	Gold		Silver		Bronze	
60 metres	Doris Batter	7.7	Betty Brickwood	7.7	June Kinna	
100 metres	Sylvia Cheeseman	12.1	Dorothy Manley	12.2	Doris Batter	12.4
200 metres	Sylvia Cheeseman	25.4	Paddy Gunn	26.4e	Margaret Walker	26.8e
400 metres	Valerie Ball	59.4	Margaret Walker	60.0	Pamela Germain	
800 metres	Hazel Spears	2:19.4	Audrey Stanley	2:20.6	Mary Webster	
1 mile	Eileen Garritt	5:20.0	Joyce Heath	5:34.6	Mary Bartleet	5:34.8
80 metres hurdles	Jean Desforges	11.9	Joan Upton	12.0	Bertha Crowther	12.8
High jump	Dorothy Tyler	1.600	Sheila Alexander	1.600	Bertha Crowther	1.600
Long jump	(Scotland) Margaret Erskine	5.37	(Scotland) Emma Anderson	5.25	Lorna Lee	5.24
Shot put	Bevis Shergold	12.36	Gwen Buddle	9.96	Ellen Allen	9.55
Discus throw	Bevis Shergold	36.97	Gwen Buddle	32.46	Joan Hesselwood	28.91
Javelin	Ellen Allen	31.62	Gladys Clarke	30.27	Bevis Shergold	29.40
Pentathlon +	Bertha Crowther	327 (3901 NR)	Paddy Gunn	288	Christine Wheeler	262
1600 metres walk	Joyce Heath	8:25.0	Angela Douglas	8:32.0	Beryl Day	8:37.6

+ held on 20 August

== See also ==
- 1949 AAA Championships
