= 1935 WAAA Championships =

British athletics event

- Dates: 10 August
- Host city: London
- Venue: White City Stadium
- Level: Senior
- Type: Outdoor

The 1935 WAAA Championships were the national track and field championships for women in the United Kingdom. The 60 metres event was held for the first time.

The event was held at White City Stadium, London, on 10 August 1935.

== Results ==
Event	Gold		Silver		Bronze	
60 metres	Audrey Wade	8.0	Ivy Walker	inches	Kathleen Stokes	inches
100 metres	Eileen Hiscock	12.2	Ivy Walker	2½ yards	Lillian Chalmers	1 foot
200 metres	Eileen Hiscock	25.3	Lillian Chalmers	2½ yards	Kathleen Stokes	1-2 yards
400 metres	Olive Hall	61.9	Cissely Colvil	62.3e	Vera Rudd	62.9e
800 metres	Nellie Halstead	2:15.6 NR	Dorothy Bruty	2:17.2	Constance Furneaux	2:19.3
80 metres hurdles	Elsie Green	12.3	Kathleen Tiffen	2½ yards	Evelyn Matthews	½ yard
High jump	Mary Milne	1.549	Dorothy Odam	1.524	Dorothy Cosnett	1.473
Long jump	Ethel Raby	5.50	Nellie Carrington	5.49	Kathleen Tilley	5.35
Shot put	Kathleen Tilley	10.08	(Argentina) Ruth Caro	9.29	Irene Phillips	9.09
Discus throw	Ada Holland	30.94	Irene Phillips	30.71	Joan Webster	30.68
Javelin	(Argentina) Ruth Caro	34.52	Gladys Lunn	32.00	Edith Halstead	31.59
1600 metres walk	Jessie Howes	7:57.8	P. Barratt	10:42.5	Queenie Waters	dsq

== See also ==
- 1935 AAA Championships
