= Katharine Connal =

British javelin thrower

Personal information
- Nationality: British (English)
- Born: 8 June 1912 Leeds, Yorkshire, England
- Died: 19 May 1983 (aged 70) Boyup Brook, Western Australia, Australia

Sport
- Sport: Athletics
- Event: Javelin throw
- Club: University of Leeds

Katharine Irene Connal (8 June 1912 – 19 May 1983) was a British athlete who competed at the 1936 Summer Olympics.

== Biography ==
Connal became the national javelin champion after winning the British WAAA Championships title at the 1936 WAAA Championships.

Shortly afterwards at the 1936 Olympic Games in Berlin, she competed in the women's javelin throw, where she finished in 14th position.

Connal retained her WAAA javelin title at the 1938 WAAA Championships and 1939 WAAA Championships. Additionally she finished third behind Bevis Reid in the shot put in 1938 and discus in 1939.

After her career was interrupted by World War II, Connal finished second behind Gladys Clarke in the javelin event at the 1945 WAAA Championships.
