= Athletics at the 1950 British Empire Games – Women's high jump =

Women's high jump at the Commonwealth Games

The women's high jump event at the 1950 British Empire Games was held on 7 February at the Eden Park in Auckland, New Zealand.

== Results ==
Rank	Name	Nationality	Result	Notes
1st place, gold medalist(s)	Dorothy Tyler	England	5 ft 3 in (1.60 m)	=GR
2nd place, silver medalist(s)	Bertha Crowther	England	5 ft 3 in (1.60 m)	=GR
3rd place, bronze medalist(s)	Noelene Swinton	New Zealand	5 ft 1 in (1.55 m)	
4	Dorothy Manley	England	5 ft 0 in (1.52 m)	
5	Joan Morrison	Australia	4 ft 10 in (1.47 m)	
5	Elaine Silburn	Canada	4 ft 10 in (1.47 m)	
5	Rosella Thorne	Canada	4 ft 10 in (1.47 m)	
5	Shirley Gordon	Canada	4 ft 10 in (1.47 m)	
5	Bev Brewis	New Zealand	4 ft 10 in (1.47 m)	
10	Jacqueline Bauman	Australia	4 ft 8 in (1.42 m)	
