= 1937 WAAA Championships =

British athletics event

- Dates: 7 August
- Host city: London
- Venue: White City Stadium
- Level: Senior
- Type: Outdoor

The 1937 WAAA Championships were the national track and field championships for women in the United Kingdom.

The event was held at White City Stadium, London, on 7 August 1937.

== Results ==
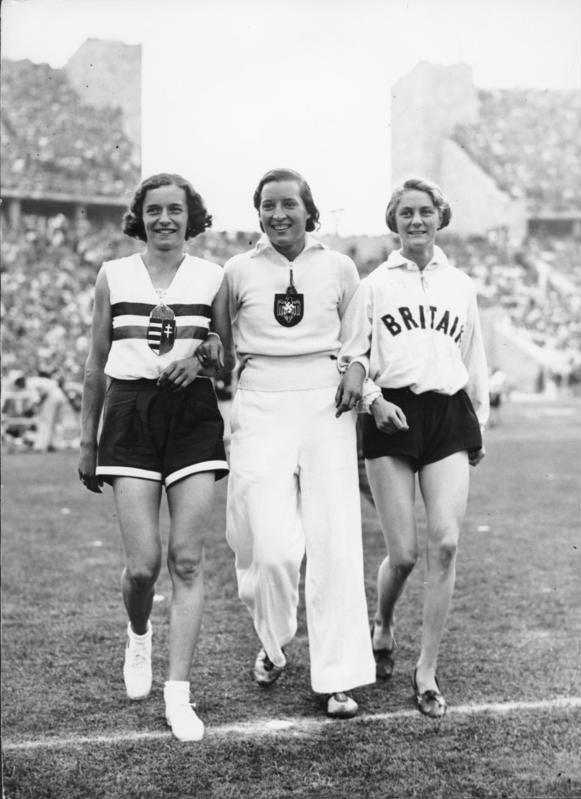
Dorothy Odam (right) won the second of her eight WAAA high jump titles

Event	Gold		Silver		Bronze	
60 metres	Betty Lock	7.8	Dorothy Marshall	1½ yards	Olive Moores	1 foot
100 metres	Winifred Jeffrey	12.2	(South Africa) Barbara Burke	12.2	Lillian Chalmers	12.2
200 metres	Lillian Chalmers	24.9	Kathleen Stokes	5 feet	(South Africa) Barbara Burke	inches
400 metres	Nellie Halstead	60.1	Vera Rudd	5 yards	Constance Furneaux	4 yards
800 metres	Gladys Lunn	2:18.5	Nellie Halstead	10 yards	Dorothy Bruty	20 yards
1 mile	Gladys Lunn	5:17.0 WR	Evelyne Forster	5:33.0	Doris Roden	40 yards
80 metres hurdles	(South Africa) Barbara Burke	12.1	Kathleen Tiffen	1 yard	Kate Robertson	inches
High jump	Dorothy Odam	1.635	Dora Gardner	1.600	Dorothy Cosnett	1.549
Long jump	Ethel Raby	5.79	Vedder Schenck	5.41	Mary Holloway	5.29
Shot put	Kathleen Tilley	10.59	Irene Phillips	9.36	Muriel Smith	8.83
Discus throw	Irene Phillips	32.61	Kathleen Tilley	29.20	Ada Holland	29.15
Javelin	Gladys Lunn	32.98	Dorothy Hewitt	31.91	Edith Halstead	31.39
1600 metres walk	Florence Pengelly	8:36.5	Doris Roden		N. Gardner	

== See also ==
- 1937 AAA Championships
