= Mary Holloway =

British athlete

Personal information
- Nationality: British (English)
- Born: 20 August 1917

Sport
- Sport: Athletics
- Club: Mitcham AC

Mary Holloway (born 20 August 1917) was an athlete who competed for England at the 1938 British Empire Games.

== Biography ==
Holloway finished third behind Ethel Raby in the long jump event at the 1937 WAAA Championships.

At the 1938 British Empire Games in Sydney, New South Wales, Australia, Holloway represented England in the 220 yards and long jump. At the time of the Games, Holloway was a typist by trade and lived in Bickley Street, Tooting.

Holloway finished second behind Betty Lock in the 100 metres event at the 1939 WAAA Championships.
