= 1948 WAAA Championships =

British athletics event

- Dates: 26 June
- Host city: Chiswick, London
- Venue: Polytechnic Stadium
- Level: Senior
- Type: Outdoor

The 1948 WAAA Championships were the national track and field championships for women in the United Kingdom.

The event was held at Polytechnic Stadium in Chiswick, London, on 26 June 1948.

== Results ==
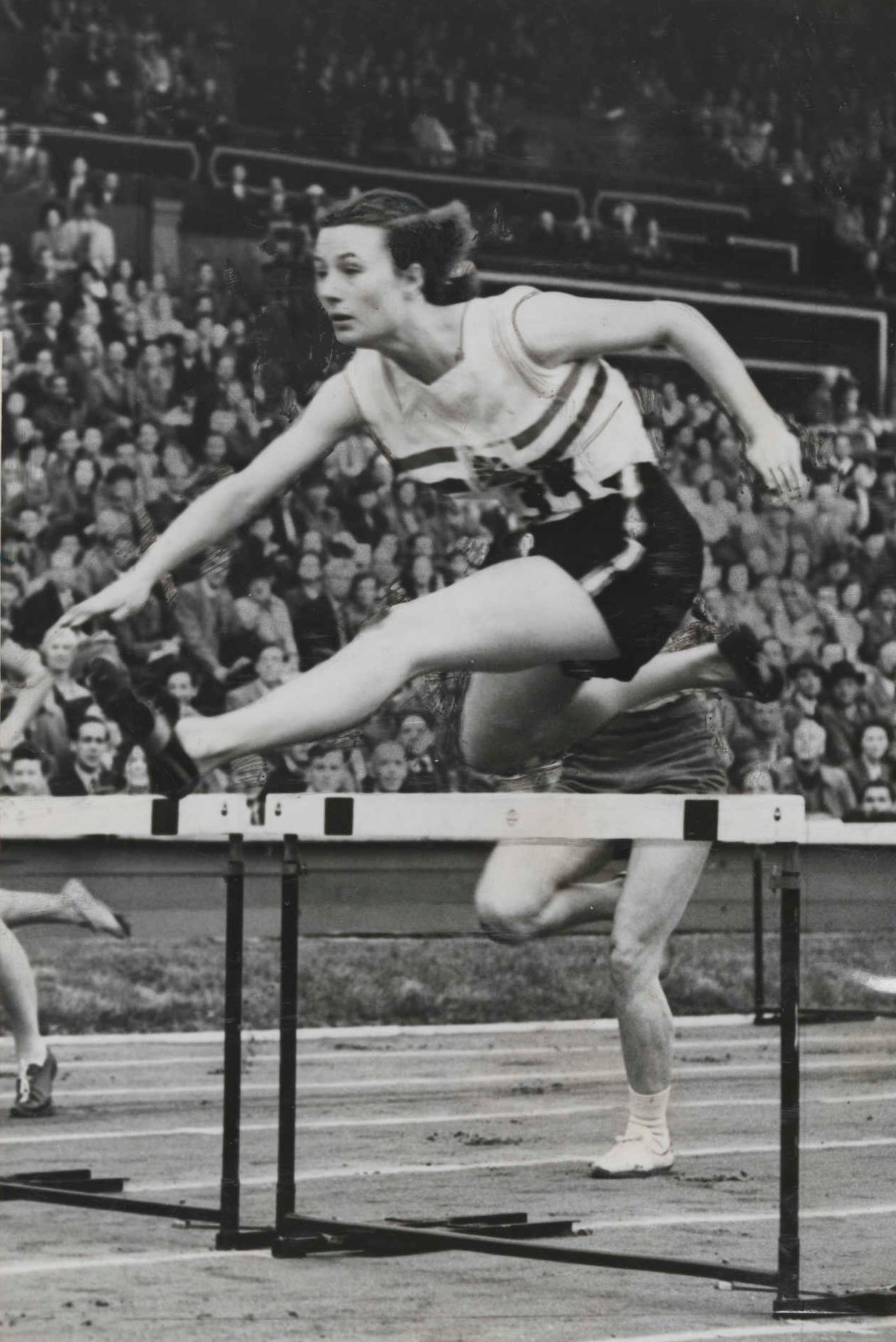
Maureen Gardner retained her 80 metres hurdles title

Event	Gold		Silver		Bronze	
60 metres	Doris Batter	9.1	Irene Robertson	9.2	(Scotland) Quita Shivas	9.2
100 metres	Winifred Jordan	12.6	Doris Batter	12.7	Muriel Pletts	12.7
200 metres	Sylvia Cheeseman	25.7	Margaret Walker	25.7	Audrey Williamson	25.8
400 metres	Valerie Ball	60.8	B. Kemp	61.3	Rose Eaton	61.8
800 metres	Nellie Batson	2:20.3	Dorothy Born	2:22.4	Eileen Garritt	2:24.0
1 mile	Nellie Batson	5:31.8	Eileen Garritt	5:37.5	Ivy Kibbler	5:38.3
80 metres hurdles	Maureen Gardner	12.0	Joan Upton	12.4	Bertha Crowther	12.5
High jump	Dorothy Tyler	1.626	Bertha Crowther	1.600	Gladys Young	1.524
Long jump	Joan Shepherd	5.70	(Scotland) Margaret Erskine	5.55	Lorna Lee	5.48
Shot put	Bevis Reid	12.34	Margaret Lucas	10.67	P. Evans	10.00
Discus throw	Bevis Reid	36.73	Elspeth Whyte	33.65	Margaret Lucas	32.25
Javelin	Bevis Reid	31.10	Marian Long	31.00	Gladys Clarke	30.63
1600 metres walk	Joyce Heath	8:17.8	Beryl Day	8:18.0	Gwen Thorne	8:20.0

== See also ==
- 1948 AAA Championships
