= Audrey Brown (athlete) =

British sprinter (1913–2005)

Personal information
- Nationality: British (English)
- Born: 24 May 1913 Bankura, West Bengal, India
- Died: 11 June 2005 (aged 92) Manchester, England

Sport
- Sport: Athletics
- Event: Sprints
- Club: Birmingham University AC; Birchfield Harriers
Medal record
Athletics
Representing the United Kingdom
Olympic Games
Silver medal – second place	1936 Berlin	4x100 metre relay

Audrey Kathleen Kilner Brown MBE (later Court; 24 May 1913 – 11 June 2005) was a British athlete who mainly competed in the 100 metres.

== Personal life ==
She was born in Bankura, India and was the younger sister of Ralph Kilner Brown and older sister of Godfrey Brown. At the age of nine, Brown moved to the United Kingdom. She studied at the University of Birmingham. In 1940, she married William Court.

== Career ==
Whilst at University, Brown competed for the Birchfield Harriers. She competed at the 1933 World Student Games.

Brown finished third behind Barbara Burke in the 100 metres event at the 1936 WAAA Championships. Shortly afterwards she competed for Great Britain at the 1936 Summer Olympics held in Berlin, Germany, where she won the silver medal in the 4 x 100 metres with her teammates Eileen Hiscock, Violet Olney and Barbara Burke.

Brown finished third behind Betty Lock and third behind Dorothy Saunders in the 100 and 200 metres events respectively at the 1938 WAAA Championships.

After retiring from athletics in 1938, Brown was an employee of Rowntree's Cocoa Works in York.
