= Dorothy Manley =

British sprint runner (1927–2021)

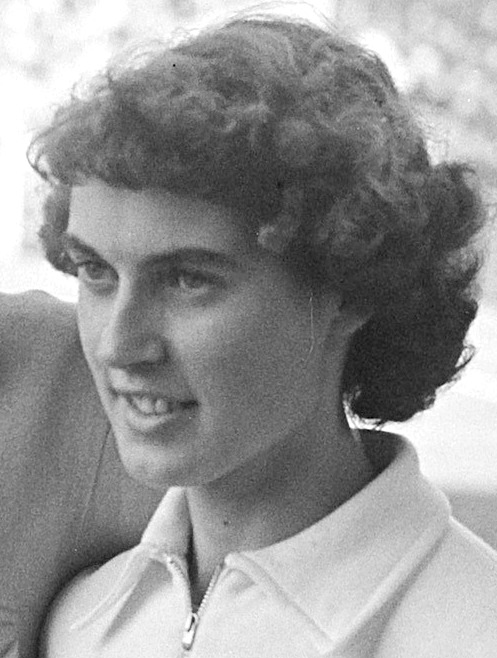
- Manley at the 1950 European championships

Personal information
- Full name: Dorothy Gladys Manley
- Nationality: British
- Born: 29 April 1927 Manor Park, London, England
- Died: 31 October 2021 (aged 94) Ilford, London, England
- Height: 1.65 m (5 ft 5 in)
- Weight: 51 kg (112 lb)

Sport
- Country: United Kingdom
- Sport: Athletics
- Club: Essex Ladies Athletics Club
- Retired: 1952

Achievements and titles
- Olympic finals: 1948 Summer Olympics: 100 m – Silver
Medal record
Women's athletics
Representing Great Britain
Olympic Games
Silver medal – second place	1948 London	100 m
European Championships
Gold medal – first place	1950 Brussels	4×100 m
Bronze medal – third place	1950 Brussels	200 m
Representing England
British Empire Games
Silver medal – second place	1950 Auckland	660 yards relay
Bronze medal – third place	1950 Auckland	440 yards relay

Dorothy Gladys Manley (later Hall, then Parlett; 29 April 1927 – 31 October 2021) was a British sprinter. She competed in the 1948 Summer Olympics, held in London, in the 100 metres where she won the silver medal with a time of 12.2 seconds. She was the first British woman to win an Olympic sprint medal. She was also a medallist in the 1950 British Empire Games, and the 1950 European Athletics Championships.

== Early life ==
Manley was born in Manor Park, London, on 29 April 1927. She was initially introduced into athletics by one of her school teachers and worked her way up from the school, to the district and then to running for her county before the Second World War. Contrary to reports, she was not evacuated during the war. In 1942 she competed in an athletics meeting at Ashton playing fields where she ran in the 200 metres for the first time.

== Athletic career ==
Manley raced for the Essex Ladies Athletics Club. Manley was added to a national list of potential Olympians in late 1947, and assigned to train with Sandy Duncan. She was originally accepted for the Olympics as a high jumper, but her coach told her she wouldn't make the grade and trained her to be a sprinter in just five months. She began her sprint training for the 1948 Summer Olympics early in March 1948, training on the track four times a week, but never using the gym. Manley described the trials as a "fiasco", but having finished second at the 1949 WAAA Championships, was picked to represent Great Britain. She was working full-time during 1948 for the Suez Canal Company as a typist, and used her summer holidays to attend the games although the leave was unpaid by her employer.

Her mother made her running vest and shorts for the Games, but she was given the blazer and skirt for the opening ceremony. While at the Games, she travelled to and from Wembley on the London Underground, as she was sharing a room with two other athletes near Eccleston Square in central London.

She qualified for the women's 100 metres final, and finished in second place, winning the silver medal in her first international athletics event. Fanny Blankers-Koen won the gold medal in first place with a time of 11.9, while Manley's time was 12.2, just ahead of Shirley Strickland de la Hunty, who registered the same time. Manley described her start in the race as the "best of her life", having described her normal starts as notoriously bad. She thought that this may have actually distracted her as her start was so good that she was expecting the race to be recalled.

Under her married name of Hall, she became the national 200 metres champion after winning the British WAAA Championships title at the 1950 WAAA Championships at White City Stadium, which was her only WAAA title. At the 1950 British Empire Games in New Zealand, she was asked after arrival if she would like to compete in the high jump – only then finding out that she had been entered in the event without her knowledge. With minimal training in the time available, she competed in the event and finished in fourth position behind Dorothy Tyler, Bertha Crowther and Noelene Swinton. She was part of the women's relay teams at the Games, and won silver in the 660 yards relay and bronze in the 440 yards relay. The team won gold in the 4 × 100 m relay at the 1950 European Athletics Championships. She described that race as particularly exciting as they had beaten the Dutch team, which included Fanny Blankers-Koen.

Hall finished second behind Sylvia Cheeseman in the 200 metres at the 1951 WAAA Championships but retired from athletics the following yeare after suffering from a thyroid condition.

== Personal life ==
Manley married twice, first in 1949 to Peter Hall, who died in 1973, and then in 1979 to John Parlett, a middle-distance runner she knew from the 1948 Olympics. In 2012 Manley had three children, five grandchildren, and 16 great-grandchildren.

Manley died on 31 October 2021, at the age of 94.
