= Joan Upton =

British hurdler

Personal information
- Nationality: British (English)
- Born: 16 December 1922 Brentford, London, England
- Died: 18 December 2016 (aged 94) Angmering, West Sussex, England
- Height: 166 cm (5 ft 5 in)
- Weight: 56 kg (123 lb)

Sport
- Sport: Track and field
- Event: 80 metres hurdles
- Club: Spartan Ladies

Joan Muriel Upton (16 December 1922 – 18 December 2016) was a British hurdler who competed at the 1948 Summer Olympics.

== Biography ==
Upton became the national 400 metres champion after winning the British WAAA Championships title at the 1947 WAAA Championships.

Upton finished second behind Maureen Gardner in the 80 metres hurdles event at the 1948 WAAA Championships.

Shortly afterwards, at the 1948 Olympic Games in London, she represented Great Britain in the women's 80 metres hurdles competition. Upton finished second again in the 80 metres hurdles event, this time behind Jean Desforges at the 1949 WAAA Championships.
