= Lorna Lee =

British long jumper (1931–2023)

Personal information
- Full name: Lorna Lee-Price
- Nationality: British
- Born: 16 July 1931 Houghton le Spring, Co. Durham, England
- Died: 6 January 2023 (aged 91) Llandough, Penarth, Wales
- Height: 162 cm (5 ft 4 in)
- Weight: 54 kg (119 lb)

Sport
- Sport: Athletics
- Event: Long jump
- Club: Tonbridge AC

Lorna Lee (16 July 1931 – 6 January 2023) was a British athlete who competed at the 1948 Summer Olympics.

== Biography ==
Lee finished third behind Joan Shepherd in the long jump event at the 1948 WAAA Championships.

Shortly afterwards representing Great Britain at the 1948 Olympic Games in London, she competed in the women's long jump competition. Lee finished second behind Margaret Erskine in the long jump event at the 1949 WAAA Championships.

Lee married James Price in 1959 in Pembroke and died in Llandough, Penarth on 6 January 2023, at the age of 91.
