= Sheila Lerwill =

British athlete (born 1928)

Sheila Lerwill (née Sheila Alexander)
Personal information
- Nationality: British (English)
- Born: 16 August 1928 (age 97) London, England
- Height: 171 cm (5 ft 7 in)
- Weight: 63 kg (139 lb)

Sport
- Sport: Athletics
- Event: high jump
- Club: Spartan Ladies
Medal record
Women's athletics
Representing Great Britain
Olympic Games
Silver medal – second place	1952 Helsinki	High jump
European Championships
Gold medal – first place	1950 Brussels	High jump

Sheila W. Lerwill (Née Alexander; born 16 August 1928) is a British retired athlete who competed mainly in the high jump and competed at the 1952 Summer Olympics.

== Biography ==
Alexander, born in London and originating from Streatham, she finished third behind Gladys Young in the high jump event at the 1947 WAAA Championships and second behind Dorothy Tyler at the 1949 WAAA Championships. She gained revenge on Tyler the following year by defeating her at the 1950 WAAA Championships.

She played netball for England and Surrey. She lived on Glenister Park Road.

In 1950 she was trained by George Pallett and took the British record on 5 August 1950 at 5 ft 6.5. She married Michael H. M. Lerwill, from Westerham, on Saturday 31 March 1951 at Holy Redeemer Church in Wandsworth and competed under her married name Lerwill thereafter.

During the 1951 WAAA Championships on 7 July 1951 at White City Stadium, Lerwill broke the world record for women's high jump, with a jump of 1.72 metres, beating the previous record of 1.71 metres set by Fanny Blankers-Koen of the Netherlands on 30 May 1943 in Amsterdam. (The record was broken on 22 May 1954 by Aleksandra Chudina of the USSR in Kiev with a jump of 1.73 metres).

Her rivalry with Dorothy Tyler continued as she finished second to her at the 1952 WAAA Championships. One month later she competed for Great Britain in the high jump at the 1952 Summer Olympics, held in Helsinki, Finland, where she won the silver medal with a jump of 1.65 metres. It was Britain's best athletics medal at the games.

Lerwill defeated Thelma Hopkins and Tyler to claim the 1953 WAAA Championships high jump title but finished second behind Jean Desforges in the long jump. The following year at the 1954 WAAA Championships, Lerwill won another WAA high jump title.

Records
Preceded by	Women's High Jump British Record Holder; 5 August 1950 – 5 May 1956	Succeeded by (Northern Ireland) Thelma Hopkins
