= Rosaline Few =

British high jumper

Personal information
- Nationality: British (English)
- Born: 20 January 1955 (age 71) Andover, Hampshire, England
- Height: 170 cm (5 ft 7 in)
- Weight: 53 kg (117 lb)

Sport
- Sport: Athletics
- Event: High jump
- Club: Mitcham AC

Rosaline Few (born 20 January 1955) is a British retired athlete who competed at the 1972 Summer Olympics.

== Biography ==
Few became the British high jump champion after winning the British WAAA Championships title at the 1972 WAAA Championships.

Shortly afterwards at the 1972 Olympics Games in Munich, she represented Great Britain in the women's high jump.
