= Gladys Clarke =

British javelin thrower

Personal information
- Nationality: British (English)
- Born: 15 February 1923 West Bromwich, England
- Died: 10 June 2013 (aged 90) Weston-super-Mare, England
- Height: 167 cm (5 ft 6 in)
- Weight: 66 kg (146 lb)

Sport
- Sport: Athletics
- Event: javelin
- Club: Birchfield Harriers

Gladys Mary Clarke (15 February 1923 – 10 June 2013) was a British javelin thrower who competed in the 1948 Summer Olympics.

== Biography ==
Clarke was born in West Bromwich on 15 February 1923. Clarke became the national javelin champion after winning the British WAAA Championships title at the 1945 WAAA Championships.

Clarke finished third behind Bevis Reid in the javelin throw event at the 1948 WAAA Championships. Shortly afterwards at the 1948 Olympic Games in London, she competed in the women's javelin throw competition. The following year, Clarke finished second behind Ellen Allen in the javelin event at the 1949 WAAA Championships and was second again at the 1950 WAAA Championships.

She died on 10 June 2013 in Weston-super-Mare, aged 90.
