= Muriel Pletts =

British sprinter (born 1931)

Personal information
- Nationality: British (English)
- Born: 23 February 1931 (age 94) Bradford, England
- Height: 171 cm (5 ft 7 in)
- Weight: 60 kg (132 lb)

Sport
- Sport: Sprinting
- Event(s): 100 metres 4 × 100 relay
- Club: Airedale Harriers, Bradford

Muriel Pletts (born 23 February 1931) is a British former sprinter who competed at the 1948 Summer Olympics.

== Biography ==
Pletts finished third behind Winifred Jordan in the 100 metres event at the 1948 WAAA Championships. Shortly afterwards at the 1948 Olympic Games in London, Pletts competed for Great Britain in the women's 4 × 100 metres relay.

She improved to runner-up behind June Foulds in the 100 metres at the 1951 WAAA Championships and placed third behind Sylvia Cheeseman in the 200 metres.

Pletts' daughter, Sue Hearnshaw, won the bronze medal in the long jump at the 1984 Summer Olympics She was also an English Schools champion.
