= List of British champions in 60 metres =

The British 60 metres athletics champions are only women because the AAA Championships for men did not hold the discipline. From 1935 until 1950 the WAAA Championships included a 60 metres event. The 60 metres event is now primarily an indoor event.

== Past winners ==
WAAA Championships 60 metres, women's event only
Year	Women's champion
1935	Audrey Wade
1936	Betty Lock
1937	Betty Lock
1938	Betty Lock
1939	Betty Lock
1946	Irene Royse
1947	Irene Royse
1948	Doris Batter
1949	Doris Batter
1950	Quita Shivas
