= 1945 WAAA Championships =

British athletics event

- Dates: 18 August
- Host city: Tooting Bec, London
- Venue: Tooting Bec Athletics Track
- Level: Senior
- Type: Outdoor

The 1945 WAAA Championships were the national track and field championships for women in the United Kingdom.

The event was held at Tooting Bec Athletics Track in Tooting Bec, London, on 18 August 1945. The Championships returned after a five-year absence due to World War II.

== Results ==
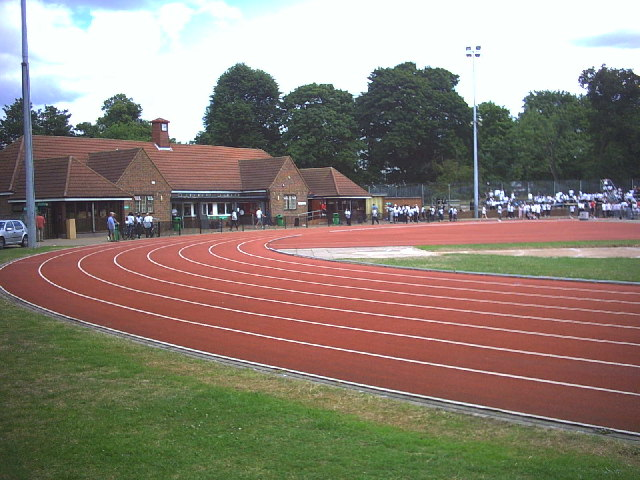
Tooting Bec athletics track in 2005

Event	Gold		Silver		Bronze	
100 metres	Winifred Jordan	12.8	Lillian Chalmers	inches	Irene Stretton	
200 metres	Winifred Jordan	26.7	Irene Stretton	inches	Joan Shepherd	
440 yards	Winifred Jordan	61.8	Lillian Chalmers		Irene Stretton	
880 yards	Phyllis Richards	2:26.7	Pat Sandall		Joyce Heath	
1 mile	Pat Sandall	5:40.2	Phyllis Richards		Helen Wright	
80 metres hurdles	Zoe Hancock	13.6	E. Lewis		J. R. Jones	
High jump	Dora Gardner	1.524	Dorothy Tyler	1.524	Doris Endruweit	1.473
Long jump	Kathleen Duffy	4.76	Vedder Schenck	4.66	Doreen Clutton	4.63
Discus throw	Kathleen Dyer (Tilley)	30.38	Muriel Smith	30.12	Margaret Lucas	27.24
Javelin	Gladys Clarke	31.72	Katharine Connal	30.10	M. Bruce	24.10
1 mile walk	Joan Riddington	8:42.8	Doris Hart		Joyce Heath	
