= List of British champions in 3000 metres walk =

The British 3,000 metres walk athletics champions covers the AAA Championships from 1901 to 1986.

Where an international athlete won the AAA Championships the highest ranking UK athlete is considered the National Champion in this list.

== Past winners ==
AAA Championships 2 miles walk, men's event only
Year	Men's champion
1901	H. T. Simpson
1902	William Sturgess
1903	Edward Negus
1904	George Larner
1905	George Larner
1906	Alfred Yeoumans
1907	Richard Harrison
1908	George Larner
1909	Ernest Webb
1910	Ernest Webb
1911	Harold Ross
1912	Bobby Bridge
1913	Bobby Bridge
1914	Bobby Bridge
1919	Bobby Bridge
1920	Charles Dowson
1921	John Evans
1922	J. W. Dowse

AAA Championships & WAAA Championships
Year	Men's champion	Year	Women's champion
	2 miles walk		880 yards walk
1923	Gordon Watts	1923	Edith Trickey
1924	Reg Goodwin	1924	Edith Trickey
1925	Reg Goodwin	1925	Florence Faulkner
1926	Wilf Cowley	1926	Daisy Crossley
1927	Alf Pope	1927	Marjorie Hegarty
	2 miles walk		1 mile walk
1928	Alf Pope	1928	Lucy Howes
1929	Alf Pope	1929	Lucy Howes
1930	Cecil Hyde	1930	Constance Mason
1931	Alf Pope	1931	Constance Mason
1932	Bert Cooper	1932	Constance Mason
	2 miles walk		1,600 metres walk
1933	Bert Cooper	1933	Jeanne Probekk
1934	Bert Cooper	1934	Jeanne Probekk
1935	Bert Cooper	1935	Jessie Howes
1936	Bert Cooper	1936	Jessie Howes
1937	Bert Cooper	1937	Florence Pengelly
1938	Bert Cooper	1938	Evelyn Webb
1939	Harry Churcher	1939	Florence Pengelly
1945	nc	1945	Joan Riddington
1946	Harry Churcher	1946	Doris Hart
1947	Harry Churcher	1947	Joan Riddington
1948	Harry Churcher	1948	Joyce Heath
1949	Harry Churcher	1949	Joyce Heath
1950	nc	1950	Joyce Heath
1951	Roland Hardy	1951	Joyce Heath
	2 miles walk		1 mile walk
1952	Roland Hardy	1952	Beryl Day
1953	George Coleman	1953	Beryl Randle
1954	George Coleman	1954	Beryl Randle
1955	George Coleman	1955	Beryl Randle
1956	Bob Goodall	1956	Dilys Williams
1957	Stan Vickers	1957	Dilys Williams
1958	Stan Vickers	1958	Dilys Williams
	2 miles walk		1.5 mile walk
1959	Ken Matthews	1959	Betty Franklin
1960	Stan Vickers	1960	Judy Woodsford
1961	Ken Matthews	1961	Sheila Jennings
1962	Ken Matthews	1962	Judy Farr
1963	Ken Matthews	1963	Judy Farr
1964	Ken Matthews	1964	Judy Farr
1965	Paul Nihill	1965	Judy Farr
1966	Ron Wallwork	1966	Judy Farr
1967	Ron Wallwork	1967	Judy Farr
1968	Arthur Jones	1968	Judy Farr
	3,000 metres walk		2,500 metres walk
1969	Roger Mills	1969	Judy Farr
1970	Paul Nihill	1970	Judy Farr
1971	Paul Nihill	1971	Brenda Cook
1972	Roger Mills	1972	Betty Jenkins
	3,000 metres walk		3,000 metres walk
1973	Roger Mills	1973	Betty Jenkins
1974	Roger Mills	1974	Marion Fawkes

3,000m walk, men's event only
Year	Men's champion
1975	Paul Nihill
1976	Roger Mills
1977	Roger Mills
1978	Roger Mills
1979	Roger Mills
1980	Steve Barry
1981	Roger Mills
1982	Roger Mills
1983	Phil Vesty
1984	Phil Vesty
1985	Ian McCombie
1986	Chris Smith

DISCONTINUED

nc = not contested
