= List of British champions in 200 metres =

The British 200 metres athletics champions covers three competitions; the current British Athletics Championships which was founded in 2007, the preceding AAA Championships which existed until 2006 and the UK Athletics Championships which existed from 1977 until 1997 and ran concurrently with the AAA Championships.

The AAA Championships were open to international athletes but were not considered the National Champion in this list if they won the relevant Championship.

Between 1977 and 1994, and again in 1997, two events effectively crowned national champions each year. The official UK Athletics Championships (not to be confused with the current championships, a rebranded British Athletics Championships) were specifically only open to British nationals and were organised by the national governing body. The AAA Championships continued, and due to their history, continued to be considered by both statisticians and athletes to be the more prestigious championships, with the exception of 1997 where the UK Championships were considered the principle championships for the only time. Winners at the UK Championships were nonetheless considered as having won a national title.

The UK Athletics Championships ceased to exist upon the insolvency of the governing body, the British Athletics Federation. The AAA championships continued until 2006, before they were replaced by the new British Athletics Championships.

Kathy Smallwood-Cook accumulated 11 titles in the dual championship era, and won six titles specifically in the AAA Championship continuity, a record shared with Sylvia Cheeseman. Smallwood-Cook is widely recognised as the most successful female 200 metre athlete in the history of the national championships.

John Regis won a total of six AAA Championship and four UK Championships titles, with at least one title in each of nine years with 1986 the only season he won both titles; however, Regis' total in the 'AAA continuity' lies one behind the outright record from the single championship era, the seven titles won by McDonald Bailey. The two are considered the most successful male athletes in the event.

== Past winners ==
AAA Championships 220 yards, men's event only
Year	Men's champion
1902	Reginald Wadsley
1903	George Brewill
1904	Claude Jupp
1905	Claude Jupp
1906	Claude Jupp ^{(3)}
1907	John George
1908	Lionel Reed
1909	Ernest Haley
1910	Ernest Haley ^{(2)}
1911	NBA
1912	Willie Applegarth
1913	Willie Applegarth
1914	Willie Applegarth ^{(3)}
1919	William Hill
1920	Harry Edward
1921	Harry Edward

AAA Championships & WAAA Championships
Year	Men's champion	Year	Women's champion
220 yards
1922	Harry Edward ^{(3)}	1922	Mary Lines
1923	Eric Liddell	1923	Eileen Edwards
1924	Eric Liddell ^{(2)}	1924	Eileen Edwards
1925	John Rinkel	1925	Vera Palmer
1926	Guy Butler	1926	Vera Palmer ^{(2)}
1927	Guy Butler ^{(2)}	1927	Eileen Edwards ^{(3)}
1928	Walter Rangeley	1928	Ivy Walker
1929	John Hanlon	1929	Winifred Weldon
1930	Stanley Engelhart	1930	Nellie Halstead
1931	Robin Murdoch	1931	Nellie Halstead
1932	Fred Reid	1932	Nellie Halstead
1933	Fred Reid ^{(2)}	1933	Eileen Hiscock
1934	Robin Murdoch	1934	Nellie Halstead ^{(4)}
1935	Arthur Sweeney	1935	Eileen Hiscock
1936	Arthur Sweeney	1936	Eileen Hiscock ^{(3)}
1937	Arthur Sweeney ^{(3)}	1937	Leonard Chalmers
1938	Robin Murdoch ^{(3)}	1938	Dorothy Saunders
1939	Cyril Holmes	1939	Leonard Chalmers ^{(2)}
1945	nc	1945	Winifred Jordan
1946	McDonald Bailey	1946	Sylvia Cheeseman
1947	McDonald Bailey	1947	Sylvia Cheeseman
1948	Alastair McCorquodale	1948	Sylvia Cheeseman
1949	McDonald Bailey	1949	Sylvia Cheeseman
1950	McDonald Bailey	1950	Dorothy Hall
1951	McDonald Bailey	1951	Sylvia Cheeseman
1952	McDonald Bailey	1952	Sylvia Cheeseman ^{(6)}
1953	McDonald Bailey ^{(7)}	1953	Ann Johnson
1954	Brian Shenton	1954	Ann Johnson ^{(2)}
1955	George Ellis	1955	Jean Scrivens
1956	Brian Shenton ^{(2)}	1956	June Paul
1957	David Segal	1957	Heather Young
1958	David Segal ^{(2)}	1958	Heather Young ^{(2)}
1959	David Jones	1959	Dorothy Hyman
1960	David Jones	1960	Dorothy Hyman
1961	David Jones	1961	Jenny Smart
1962	David Jones	1962	Dorothy Hyman
1963	David Jones ^{(5)}	1963	Dorothy Hyman
1964	Menzies Campbell	1964	Daphne Arden
1965	Pat Morrison	1965	Janet Simpson
1966	Menzies Campbell	1966	Janet Simpson ^{(2)}
1967	Menzies Campbell ^{(3)}	1967	Maureen Tranter
1968	Ralph Banthorpe	1968	Val Peat
200 metres - metrification
1969	David Dear	1969	Dorothy Hyman ^{(5)}
1970	Martin Reynolds	1970	Margaret Critchley
1971	Alan Pascoe	1971	Margaret Critchley ^{(2)}
1972	Alan Pascoe ^{(2)}	1972	Donna Murray
1973	Chris Monk	1973	Helen Gordon
1974	Chris Monk ^{(2)}	1974	Helen Gordon
1975	Ainsley Bennett	1975	Helen Gordon ^{(3)}
1976	Glen Cohen	1976	Denise Ramsden

AAA Championships/WAAA Championships & UK Athletics Championships dual championships era 1977-1987
Year	Men AAA	Year	Women WAAA	Year	Men UK	Women UK
1977	Glen Cohen ^{(2)}	1977	Sonia Lannaman	1977	Ainsley Bennett	Sonia Lannaman
1978	Mike McFarlane	1978	Kathy Smallwood	1978	Allan Wells	Sonia Lannaman ^{(2)}
1979	Mike McFarlane	1979	Kathy Smallwood	1979	Trevor Hoyte	Heather Hunte
1980	Trevor Hoyte	1980	Kathy Smallwood	1980	Cameron Sharp	Kathy Smallwood
1981	Mike McFarlane ^{(3)}	1981	Sonia Lannaman ^{(2)}	1981	Earl Tulloch	Linsey MacDonald
1982	Buster Watson	1982	Kathy Smallwood	1982	Mike McFarlane	Bev Callender
1983	Donovan Reid	1983	Michelle Scutt	1983	Buster Watson	Kathy Smallwood
1984	Todd Bennett	1984	Kathy Cook (née Smallwood)	1984	Todd Bennett	Heather Oakes
1985	Ade Mafe	1985	Kathy Cook ^{(6)}	1985	John Regis; Linford Christie	Kathy Cook
1986	John Regis	1986	Simmone Jacobs	1986	John Regis	Kathy Cook ^{(5)}
1987	John Regis	1987	Joan Baptiste	1987	Roger Black	Paula Dunn

AAA Championships & UK Athletics Championships dual championships era 1988-1997
Year	Men AAA	Women AAA	Year	Men UK	Women UK
1988	Linford Christie	Simmone Jacobs	1988	Linford Christie ^{(2)}	Paula Dunn ^{(2)}
1989	Marcus Adam	Paula Dunn	1989	Marcus Adam	Jennifer Stoute
1990	John Regis	Jennifer Stoute	1990	Ade Mafe	Phylis Smith
1991	Michael Rosswess	Stephi Douglas	1991	John Regis ^{(3)}	Linda Keough
1992	John Regis	Sallyanne Short	1992	Marcus Adam ^{(2)}	Phylis Smith ^{(2)}
1993	Toby Box	Simmone Jacobs	1993	John Regis ^{(4)}	Katharine Merry
1994	Solomon Wariso	Katharine Merry	n/a		
1995	John Regis	Catherine Murphy	n/a		
1996	John Regis ^{(6)}	Simmone Jacobs ^{(4)}	n/a		
1997	Marlon Devonish	Sharon Tunaley	1997	Doug Walker	Katharine Merry ^{(2)}

AAA Championships second era 1998-2006
Year	Men's champion	Women's champion
1998	Doug Walker	Katharine Merry ^{(2)}
1999	Julian Golding	Joice Maduaka
2000	Darren Campbell	Sarah Wilhelmy
2001	Marlon Devonish	Shani Anderson
2002	Marlon Devonish	Shani Anderson ^{(2)}
2003	Julian Golding ^{(2)}	Abiodun Oyepitan
2004	Chris Lambert	Joice Maduaka
2005	Christian Malcolm	Donna Fraser
2006	Marlon Devonish	Joice Maduaka ^{(3)}

British Athletics Championships 2007 to present
Year	Men's champion	Women's champion
2007	Marlon Devonish ^{(5)}	Jeanette Kwakye
2008	Christian Malcolm	Emily Freeman
2009	Toby Sandeman	Emily Freeman ^{(2)}
2010	Christian Malcolm	Laura Turner
2011	Christian Malcolm ^{(4)}	Jeanette Kwakye ^{(2)}
2012	James Ellington	Margaret Adeoye
2013	James Ellington ^{(2)}	Anyika Onuora
2014	Danny Talbot	Jodie Williams
2015	Zharnel Hughes	Margaret Adeoye ^{(2)}
2016	Adam Gemili	Dina Asher-Smith
2017	Nethaneel Mitchell-Blake	Shannon Hylton
2018	Nethaneel Mitchell-Blake	Beth Dobbin
2019	Adam Gemili	Jodie Williams
2020	Andrew Morgan-Harrison	Hannah Williams
2021	Adam Gemili ^{(3)}	Jodie Williams ^{(3)}
2022	Nethaneel Mitchell-Blake ^{(3)}	Daryll Neita
2023	Zharnel Hughes	Daryll Neita ^{(2)}
2024	Matthew Hudson-Smith	Dina Asher-Smith
2025	Zharnel Hughes	Dina Asher-Smith ^{(3)}
2026	Zharnel Hughes ^{(4)}	Success Eduan

NBA = No British athlete in final nc = not contested + = UK Championships

=== Most titles ===
('AAA continuity' only; athletes in bold still active)

200 metres - most titles
Titles	Men	Women
7	McDonald Bailey (1946-47, 1949-53)	
6	John Regis (1986-87, 1990, 1992, 1995-96)	Sylvia Cheeseman (1946-49, 1951-52); Kathy Smallwood-Cook (1978-80. 1982, 1984-85)
5	Marlon Devonish (1997, 2001-02, 2006-07); David Jones (1959-63)	Dorothy Hyman (1959-60, 1962-63, 1969)
4	**Zharnel Hughes** (2015, 2023, 2025-26); Christian Malcolm (2005, 2008, 2010-11)	Nellie Halstead (1930-32, 1934); Simmone Jacobs (1986, 1988, 1993, 1996)
3	9 athletes (1 active)	6 athletes (1 active)
