= Diane Coates =

British javelin thrower

Personal information
- Nationality: British (English)
- Born: 25 June 1932 Oxford, England
- Died: 21 November 2021 (aged 89)
- Height: 170 cm (5 ft 7 in)
- Weight: 70 kg (154 lb)

Sport
- Sport: Athletics
- Event: Javelin throw
- Club: Oxford LAC

Diane Coates married name Seaman (25 June 1932 – 21 November 2021) was a British athlete who comepeted at the 1952 Summer Olympics.

== Career ==
Coates became the national javelin champion after winning the British WAAA Championships title at the 1950 WAAA Championships and successfully retained her title at the 1951 WAAA Championships and 1952 WAAA Championships.

Coates was selected to represent Great Britain in the women's javelin throw competition at the 1952 Olympic Games in Helsinki, where she finished 15th.

Coates won another WAAA title at the 1955 WAAA Championships.
