= Suzanne Allday =

British discus thrower and shot putter

Personal information
- Full name: Suzanne Allday-Goodison (née Suzanne Farmer)
- Nationality: British (English)
- Born: 26 November 1934 Shoreham-by-Sea, West Sussex, England
- Died: 26 July 2017 (aged 82)

Sport
- Sport: Athletics
- Event: Discus / Shot put
- Club: Brighton LAC; Spartan LAC
Medal record
Women's Athletics
Representing England
Commonwealth Games
Silver medal – second place	1954 Vancouver	Discus Throw
Gold medal – first place	1958 Cardiff	Discus Throw
Silver medal – second place	1958 Cardiff	Shot Put
Bronze medal – third place	1962 Perth	Shot Put

Suzanne Allday-Goodison née Farmer (26 November 1934 – 26 July 2017) was an English discus thrower and shot putter who represented Great Britain at three Summer Olympics in 1952, 1956 and 1960.

== Biography ==
Farmer was born in Shoreham-by-Sea, West Sussex and was affiliated with the Brighton Ladies Athletic Club and the Spartan Ladies Athletic Club during her career.

Farmer finished second behind Bevis Shergold in the discus throw event and third behind Shergold in the shot put event at the 1951 WAAA Championships.

Farmer became the national discus champion for the first time after winning the British WAAA Championships title at the 1952 WAAA Championships and duly retained the title at the 1953 WAAA Championships.

In 1953, Farmer married hammer thrower Peter Allday and competed under her married name thereafter. In 1954 she won the first of four medals for England at the Commonwealth Games. The first was a silver medal in the discus at the 1954 British Empire and Commonwealth Games.

Allday won a remarkable eight shot put national titles and nine national discus title. Only Josephine Cook (in 1955 and 1957) stopped her from winning ten consecutive shot out titles from 1954 to 1963.

Allday-Goodison represented England at the 1958 British Empire and Commonwealth Games in Cardiff winning a gold medal in the discus and a silver medal in the shot put.

Four years later she won a bronze medal in the shot put at the 1962 Commonwealth Games in Perth, Western Australia.
