= Constance Furneaux =

British athlete

Personal information
- Nationality: British (English)
- Born: 20 April 1916 (age 109) Wandsworth, London, England

Sport
- Sport: Athletics
- Event: middle-distance
- Club: Mitcham AC

Constance Mary Furneaux (20 April 1916 – unknown), married name Clarke, was an athlete who competed for England at the 1934 British Empire Games.

== Biography ==
At the 1934 British Empire Games in London, she competed for England in the 880 yards competition.

Furneaux finished third behind Nellie Halstead in the 800 metres event at the 1935 WAAA Championships and the 1937 WAAA Championships.

Furneaux married James Clarke in Croydon during 1939.
