= Violet Olney =

English athlete (1911–1999)

Personal information
- Nationality: British (English)
- Born: 22 May 1911 Southwark, England
- Died: 3 January 1999 (aged 87) Addlestone, England
- Height: 162 cm (5 ft 4 in)
- Weight: 56 kg (123 lb)

Sport
- Sport: Athletics
- Event: Sprints
- Club: Civil Service WAC
Medal record
Women's athletics
Representing Great Britain
Olympic Games
Silver medal – second place	1936 Berlin	4x100 metre relay

Violet Rose Olney (later Parish; 22 May 1911 – 3 January 1999) was an English athlete who competed at the 1936 Summer Olympics.

== Biography ==
Olney from Southwark, London, who mainly competed in the 100 metres.

Olney finished second behind Eileen Hiscock in the 200 metres event at the 1933 WAAA Championships.

After finishing third behind Barbara Burke in the 200 metres event at the 1936 WAAA Championships, Olney competed for Great Britain at the 1936 Olympic Games in Berlin, where she won the silver medal in the women's 4 x 100 metres with her teammates Eileen Hiscock, Audrey Brown and Barbara Burke.
