= List of British champions in long jump =

The British long jump athletics champions covers four competitions; the current British Athletics Championships which was founded in 2007, the preceding AAA Championships (1880-2006), the Amateur Athletic Club Championships (1866-1879) and finally the UK Athletics Championships which existed from 1977 until 1997 and ran concurrently with the AAA Championships.

+Where an international athlete won the AAA Championships the highest ranking UK athlete is considered the National Champion in this list. Irish athletes originally represented Great Britain.

== Past winners ==
AAC Championships men's event only
Year	Men's champion
1866	Richard Fitzherbert
1867	Richard Fitzherbert
1868	Robert Mitchell
1869	Alick Tosswill
1870	Robert Mitchell
1871	Jenner Davies & Robert Mitchell
1872	Jenner Davies
1873	Charles Lockton
1874	Jenner Davies
1875	Charles Lockton
1876	John Alkin
1877	John Alkin
1878	Edmund Baddeley
1879	William Elliott / Charles Lockton
AAA Championships long jump, men's event only
1880	Charles Lockton
1881	Patrick Davin
1882	Thomas Malone
1883	John Parsons
1884	Ernest Horwood
1885	John Purcell
1886	John Purcell
1887	Francis Roberts
1888	NBA
1889	Daniel Delany Bulger
1890	Robert Hogarth
1891	Daniel Delany Bulger
1892	Daniel Delany Bulger
1893	Tom Donovan
1894	Tom Donovan
1895	William Oakley
1896	Claude Leggatt
1897	Claude Leggatt
1898	William Newburn
1899	William Newburn
1900	Peter O'Connor
1901	Peter O'Connor
1902	Peter O'Connor
1903	Peter O'Connor
1904	Peter O'Connor
1905	Peter O'Connor
1906	Peter O'Connor
1907	Denis Murray
1908	Wilfred Bleaden
1909	Tim Ahearne
1910	Percy Kirwan
1911	Percy Kirwan
1912	Percy Kirwan
1913	Sidney Abrahams
1914	Philip Kingsford
1919	Harold Abrahams
1920	NBA
1921	Leonard Ingrams
1922	Guy Brockington

AAA Championships & WAAA Championships
Year	Men's champion	Year	Women's champion
1923	Harold Abrahams	1923	Mary Lines
1924	Harold Abrahams	1924	Mary Lines
1925	William Childs	1925	Hilda Hatt
1926	Henry Bagnall-Oakeley	1926	Phyllis Green
1927	Reg Revans	1927	Muriel Gunn
1928	Reg Revans	1928	Muriel Gunn
1929	James Cohen	1929	Muriel Cornell
1930	Reg Revans	1930	Muriel Cornell
1931	Stanley Edenborough	1931	Muriel Cornell
1932	Stanley Edenborough	1932	Phyllis Bartholomew
1933	Edward Boyce	1933	Phyllis Bartholomew
1934	Sandy Duncan	1934	Phyllis Bartholomew
1935	Sandy Duncan	1935	Ethel Raby
1936	George Traynor	1936	Ethel Raby
1937	Sam Beattie	1937	Ethel Raby
1938	William Breach	1938	Ethel Raby
1939	William Breach	1939	Ethel Raby
1945	nc	1945	Kathleen Duffy
1946	Denis Watts	1946	Ethel Davies (Raby)
1947	Harry Whittle	1947	Kathleen Duffy
1948	Harry Whittle	1948	Joan Shepherd
1949	Harry Whittle	1949	Margaret Erskine
1950	Harry Askew	1950	Margaret Erskine
1951	Roy Cruttenden	1951	Dorothy Tyler
1952	Roy Cruttenden	1952	Shirley Cawley
1953	Peter Whaley	1953	Jean Desforges
1954	Roy Cruttenden	1954	Jean Desforges
1955	Roy Cruttenden	1955	Thelma Hopkins
1956	Roy Cruttenden	1956	Sheila Hoskin
1957	Roy Cruttenden	1957	Christina Persighetti
1958	Roy Cruttenden	1958	Sheila Hoskin
1959	David Whyte	1959	Mary Bignal
1960	Fred Alsop	1960	Ann Packer
1961	John Howell	1961	Mary Rand
1962	John Howell	1962	Thelma Hopkins
1963	Fred Alsop	1963	Mary Rand
1964	Lynn Davies	1964	Mary Rand
1965	Fred Alsop	1965	Mary Rand
1966	Lynn Davies	1966	Mary Rand
1967	Lynn Davies	1967	Ann Wilson
1968	Lynn Davies	1968	Sheila Sherwood
1969	Lynn Davies	1969	Sheila Sherwood
1970	Alan Lerwill	1970	Ann Wilson
1971	Alan Lerwill	1971	Sheila Sherwood
1972	Alan Lerwill	1972	Sheila Sherwood
1973	Geoff Hignett	1973	Myra Nimmo
1974	Alan Lerwill	1974	Ruth Martin-Jones
1975	Alan Lerwill	1975	Myra Nimmo
1976	Roy Mitchell	1976	Sue Reeve

AAA Championships/WAAA Championships & UK Athletics Championships dual championships era 1977-1987
Year	AAA Men	Year	WAAA Women	Year	UK Men	UK Women
1977	Daley Thompson	1977	Sue Reeve	1977	Tony Henry	Sharon Colyear
1978	Roy Mitchell	1978	Jill Davies	1978	Ken Cocks	Sue Reeve
1979	Roy Mitchell	1979	Sue Hearnshaw	1979	Daley Thompson	Sue Reeve
1980	Gus Udo	1980	Sue Reeve	1980	Roy Mitchell	Sue Hearnshaw
1981	Roy Mitchell	1981	Allison Manley	1981	Colin Rattigan	Sandra Green
1982	John Herbert	1982	Sue Hearnshaw	1982	John Herbert	Beverly Kinch
1983	Fred Salle	1983	Joyce Oladapo	1983	Derrick Brown	Beverly Kinch
1984	Fred Salle	1984	Sue Hearnshaw	1984	Derrick Brown	Sue Hearnshaw
1985	Derrick Brown	1985	Joyce Oladapo	1985	Denis Costello	Margaret Cheetham
1986	Derrick Brown	1986	Mary Berkeley	1986	Derrick Brown	Kim Hagger
1987	Keith Fleming	1987	Mary Berkeley	1987	Stewart Faulkner	Mary Berkeley

AAA Championships & UK Athletics Championships dual championships era 1988-1997
Year	Men AAA	Women AAA	Year	Men UK	Women UK
1988	Stewart Faulkner	Fiona May	1988	Derrick Brown	Mary Berkeley
1989	Stewart Faulkner	Fiona May	1989	Mark Forsythe	Fiona May
1990	Stewart Faulkner	Fiona May	1990	Kevin Liddington	Mary Berkeley
1991	Barrington Williams	Fiona May	1991	Mark Forsythe	Fiona May
1992	Mark Forsythe	Fiona May	1992	Stewart Faulkner	Oluyinka Idowu
1993	Fred Salle	Joanne Wise	1993	Ian Simpson	Fiona May
1994	Barrington Williams	Oluyinka Idowu	n/a		
1995	Fred Salle	Denise Lewis	n/a		
1996	Darren Ritchie	Denise Lewis	n/a		
1997	Steve Phillips	Andrea Coore	1997	Steve Phillips	Joanne Wise

AAA Championships second era 1998-2006
Year	Men's champion	Women's champion
1998	Nathan Morgan	Denise Lewis
1999	Steve Phillips	Jo Wise
2000	George Audu	Jo Wise
2001	Nathan Morgan	Ann Danson
2002	Darren Ritchie	Jade Johnson
2003	Darren Ritchie	Jade Johnson
2004	Chris Tomlinson	Jade Johnson
2005	Greg Rutherford	Kelly Sotherton
2006	Greg Rutherford	Kelly Sotherton
British Athletics Championships 2007 to present
Year	Men's champion	Women's champion
2007	Chris Tomlinson	Kelly Sotherton
2008	Greg Rutherford	Jade Johnson
2009	Chris Tomlinson	Phyllis Agbo
2010	Chris Tomlinson	Jade Johnson
2011	Julian Reid	Shara Proctor
2012	Greg Rutherford	Shara Proctor
2013	Chris Tomlinson	Shara Proctor
2014	JJ Jegede	Katarina Johnson-Thompson
2015	Greg Rutherford	Shara Proctor
2016	Daniel Gardiner	Jazmin Sawyers
2017	Dan Bramble	Lorraine Ugen
2018	Tim Duckworth	Lorraine Ugen
2019	Tim Duckworth	Abigail Irozuru
2020	Reynold Banigo	Jazmin Sawyers
2021	Alexander Farquharson	Jazmin Sawyers
2022	Reynold Banigo	Lorraine Ugen
2023	Jacob Fincham-Dukes	Jazmin Sawyers
2024	Jacob Fincham-Dukes	Jade O'Dowda
2025	Alessandro Schenini	Jazmin Sawyers
2026	Stephen Mackenzie	

- NBA = No British athlete in medal placings
- nc = not contested
