= 1936 WAAA Championships =

British athletics event

- Dates: 18 July
- Host city: London
- Venue: White City Stadium
- Level: Senior
- Type: Outdoor

The 1936 WAAA Championships were the national track and field championships for women in the United Kingdom. The 1 mile event was held for the first time.

The event was held at White City Stadium, London, on 18 July 1936.

== Results ==
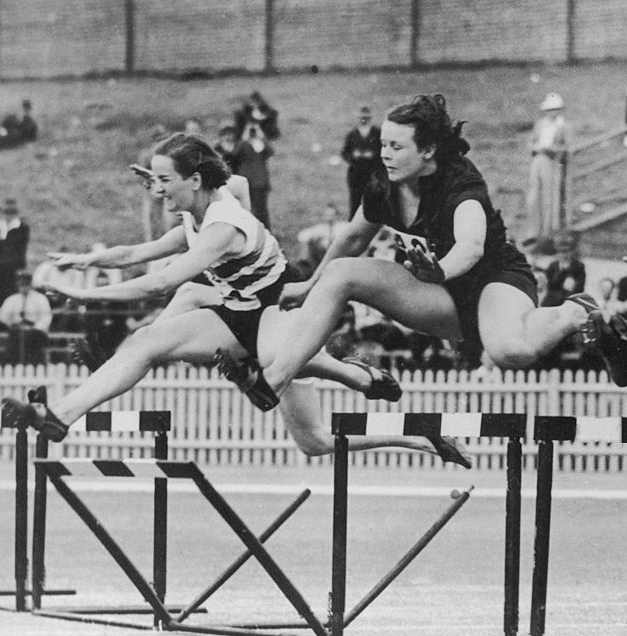
Barbara Burke (right) won three WAAA titles

Event	Gold		Silver		Bronze	
60 metres	Betty Lock	7.6 NR	Ethel Raby	1 yard	Irene Bigwood	1 foot
100 metres	(South Africa) Barbara Burke	12.3	Eileen Hiscock	1 yard	Audrey Brown	inches
200 metres	(South Africa) Barbara Burke	25.2	Eileen Hiscock	1 yard	Violet Olney	3 yards
400 metres	Olive Hall	58.6	Vera Rudd	61.0	Betty Walters	61.5
800 metres	Olive Hall	2:20.2	Evelyne Forster	2:24.8e	Mary French	2 yards
1 mile	Gladys Lunn	5:23.0 WR	Nellie Halstead	5:28.0	Helen Wright	5:32.0
80 metres hurdles	(South Africa) Barbara Burke	11.9	Violet Webb	11.9e	(South Africa) Bernice Steyl	12.8e
High jump	Dorothy Odam	1.537	Nellie Carrington	1.524	Alice Flack	1.499
Long jump	Ethel Raby	5.45	Nellie Carrington	5.22	Grace Gregory	5.14
Shot put	(South Africa) Bernice Steyl	10.74	Kathleen Tilley	10.32 NR	Irene Phillips	9.76
Discus throw	Irene Phillips	30.82	Ada Holland	30.20	Margaret Cox	29.94
Javelin	Katharine Connal	35.99 NR	(Argentina) Ruth Caro	33.48	Gladys Lunn	32.88
1600 metres walk	Jessie Howes	8:14.2	Florence Pengelly	20 yards	Queenie Waters	15 yards

== See also ==
- 1936 AAA Championships
