= 1946 WAAA Championships =

British athletics event

- Dates: 13 July
- Host city: London
- Venue: White City Stadium
- Level: Senior
- Type: Outdoor

The 1946 WAAA Championships were the national track and field championships for women in the United Kingdom.

The event was held at White City Stadium, London, on 13 July 1946.

== Results ==
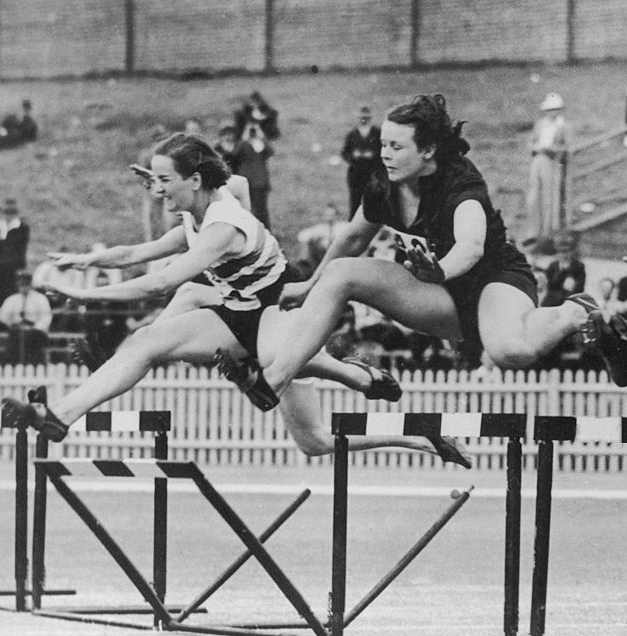
Ethel Davies (left) (née Raby) won her sixth WAAA long jump title

Event	Gold		Silver		Bronze	
60 metres	Irene Royse	8.1	Rosa Hibberd		Betty Witts	
100 metres	Maureen Gardner	12.6	Winifred Jordan	12.8e	Joyce Judd	
200 metres	Sylvia Cheeseman	25.7	Winifred Jordan		Joyce Judd	
400 metres	Margaret Walker	59.3	Phyllis Richards		Lillian Chalmers	
800 metres	Phyllis Richards	2:21.0	Brenda Harris		Joyce Heath	
1 mile	Brenda Harris	5:33.6	Dorothy Daniels		Helen Wright	
80 metres hurdles	Bertha Crowther	12.8	Zoe Hancock		(Scotland) Doris M. C. Young	
High jump	Dora Gardner	1.549	Doris Endruweit	1.524	Bertha Crowther	1.524
Long jump	Ethel Davies	5.05	Kathleen Duffy	4.94	Doreen Clutton	4.86
Shot put	Kathleen Dyer	10.19	Margaret Lasbrey	9.45	P. Evans	8.78
Discus throw	Margaret Lasbrey	28.36	Doris Endruweit	28.04	Kathleen Dyer	26.57
Javelin	Margaret Lasbrey	34.44	Doris Endruweit	26.37	Vera Wheeler	23.64
1600 metres walk	Doris Hart	8:38.6	Beryl Day		Betty Sankey	

== See also ==
- 1946 AAA Championships
