= Bertha Crowther =

British athlete

Bertha Crowther née Piggott
Personal information
- Nationality: British (English)
- Born: 9 December 1921 Hendon, England
- Died: 8 August 2007 (aged 85) Cheshire, England
- Height: 174 cm (5 ft 9 in)
- Weight: 63 kg (139 lb)

Sport
- Sport: Track and field
- Event: 80 metres hurdles / high jump
- Club: Middlesex Ladies
Medal record
Women's athletics
Representing England
British Empire Games
| Silver medal – second place | 1950 Auckland | high jump |
Representing Great Britain
European Championships
| Silver medal – second place | 1950 Brussels | Pentathlon |

Bertha Crowther, née Bertha Piggott, (9 December 1921 – 8 August 2007) was a British athlete who competed at the 1948 Summer Olympics.

== Biography ==
Crowther became the national 80 metres hurdles champion after winning the British WAAA Championships title at the 1946 WAAA Championships. She also finished third behind Dora Gardner in the high jump event.

Crowther finished second behind Dorothy Tyler in the high jump event and third behind Maureen Gardner in the 80 metres hurdles event at the 1948 WAAA Championships.

Shortly afterwards, representing Great Britain at the 1948 Olympic Games in London, she competed in the women's 80 metres hurdles competition.

Crowther showcased her all round ability by becoming the inaugural national pentathlon champion at the 1949 WAAA Championships. She successfully retained her title the following year at the 1950 WAAA Championships.

She represented England and won a silver medal in the high jump at the 1950 British Empire Games in Auckland, New Zealand. She also competed in the javelin, long jump and 80 metres hurdles.
