= Dorothy Saunders =

English sprinter

Personal information
- Nationality: British (English)
- Born: 22 January 1915 Brentford, Middlesex, England
- Died: 12 November 2013 (aged 98) Devon, England

Sport
- Sport: Athletics
- Event: Sprints
- Club: Spartan LAC
Medal record
Women's athletics
Representing England
British Empire Games
Silver medal – second place	1938 Sydney	4×110/220 yd
Bronze medal – third place	1938 Sydney	3×110/220 yd

Dorothy Sylvia Saunders (later Jackson; 22 January 1915 – 12 November 2013) was an English track and field athlete who competed in the 1938 British Empire Games.

== Biography ==
Saunders was born in Brentford, Middlesex. She became the national 200 metres champion after winning the British WAAA Championships at the 1938 WAAA Championships. In addition she finished second behind Betty Lock in the 100 metres.

At the 1938 Empire Games she was a member of the England relay team which won the silver medal in the 220-110-220-110 yards event and the bronze medal in the 110-220-110 yards competition. In the 100 yards contest as well as in the 220 yards event she was eliminated in the semi-finals. She also competed in the 1938 European Championships in Athletics held in Vienna and finished fourth in the 100 metre contest and fifth in the 200 metre event.

In April 1942, she married Harold F. Jackson in Brentford. Saunders died in Devon in November 2013 at the age of 98.
