= Margaret Erskine (athlete) =

British long jumper

Personal information
- Nationality: British (English)
- Born: 31 July 1925 Alton, England
- Died: 21 May 2006 (aged 80) Elgin, Scotland

Sport
- Sport: Athletics
- Event: Long jump
- Club: Birmingham Atalanta

Margaret Erskine (31 July 1925 – 21 May 2006) was a British athlete who competed at the 1948 Summer Olympics.

== Biography ==
Erskine finished second behind Joan Shepherd in the long jump event at the 1948 WAAA Championships.

Shortly afterwards representing Great Britain at the 1948 Olympic Games in London, she competed in the women's long jump.

Erskine became the national long jump champion after winning the British WAAA Championships title at the 1949 WAAA Championships and successfully retained her title the following year at the 1950 WAAA Championships.
