= Gladys Lunn =

English track and field athlete

Personal information
- Nationality: British (English)
- Born: 1 June 1908 King's Norton, Worcestershire, England
- Died: 3 January 1988 (aged 79) Sandwell, Staffordshire, England

Sport
- Sport: Athletics
- Event: 800m/880y
- Club: Birchfield Harriers
Medal record
Representing Great Britain
Women's World Games
Gold medal – first place	1930 Prague	800 metres
Bronze medal – third place	1934 London	800 metres
Representing England
British Empire Games
Gold medal – first place	1934 London	880 yards
Gold medal – first place	1934 London	Javelin throw
Bronze medal – third place	1938 Sydney	Javelin throw

Gladys Anne Lunn (1 June 1908 – 3 January 1988) was an English track and field athlete from Birmingham, England who competed in the 1934 British Empire Games in the 1938 British Empire Games.

== Biography ==
Lunn was a member of Birchfield Harriers athletics club.

At the 1934 Empire Games she won the gold medal in the 880 yards event as well as in the javelin throw competition, an unorthodox combination.

Four years later she won the bronze medal in the javelin throw event at the 1938 Empire Games. She also participated in the 220 yards contest but did not start in her semi-final heat.

She was the inaugural winner of the (unofficial) ladies race at the International Cross Country Championships. She was also twice a medallist in the 800 metres at the Women's World Games, taking gold in 1930 before returning for a bronze medal in 1934.

Nationally, she was a multiple champion at the Women's Amateur Athletic Association Championships. This included three consecutive national 880-yard titles in 1930, 1931 and 1932, the first ever national a mile champion title in 1936 and the following year in 1937, a 1937 javelin title and two cross country titles.

Lunn had two world records ratified by the International Women's Sports Federation (FSFI): 3:04.4 minutes for the 1000 m in 1931 and 3:00.6 minutes over the same distance in 1934. Four of her performances over the mile were later recognised as world best times.
