= Oxford City Athletic Club =

Athletics club

- Founded: 1944
- Ground: Horspath Sports Ground
- Location: Horspath Road, Oxford OX4 2RR, England
- Coordinates: 51°44′15″N 1°11′13″W
- Website: official website

The Oxford City Athletic Club is an athletics club in Oxford, England.

The club is at the Horspath Sports Ground by the BMW Mini factory. It is affiliated with the Oxfordshire Athletics Association, the South of England Athletic Association (SEAA), and UK Athletics. The club is accredited by England Athletics.

== History ==
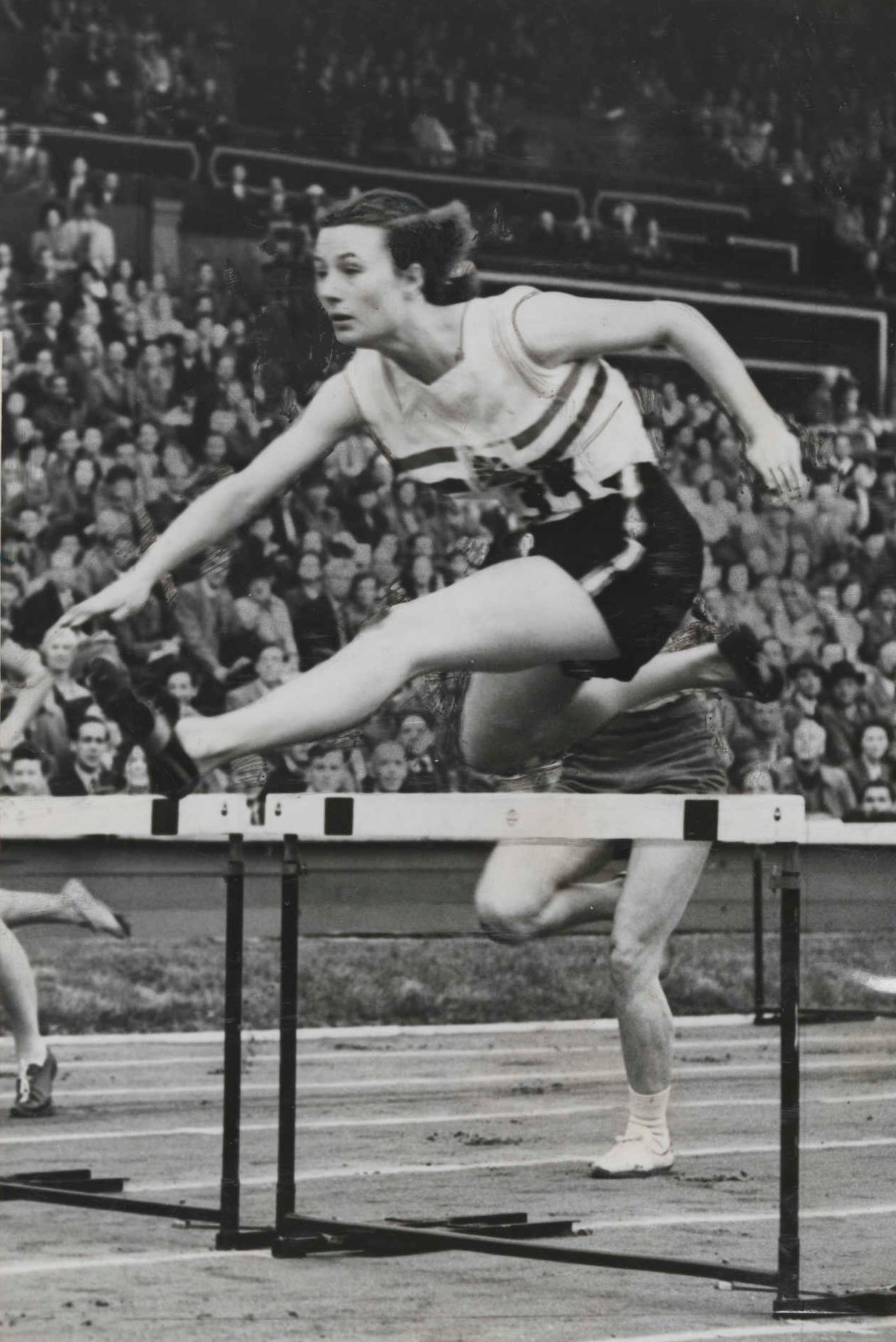
Maureen Gardner at the 1948 Olympic Games

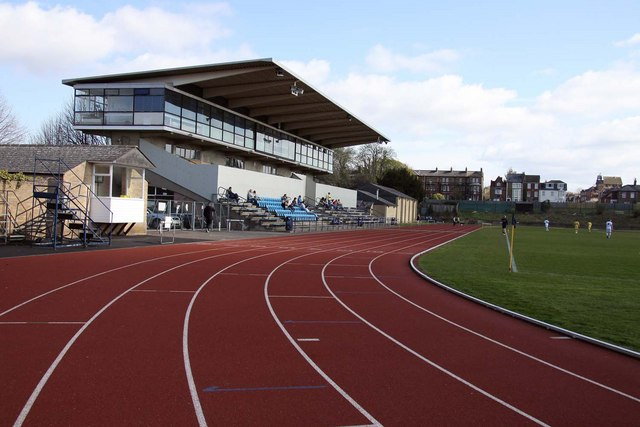
Iffley Road, the club's home until 1976

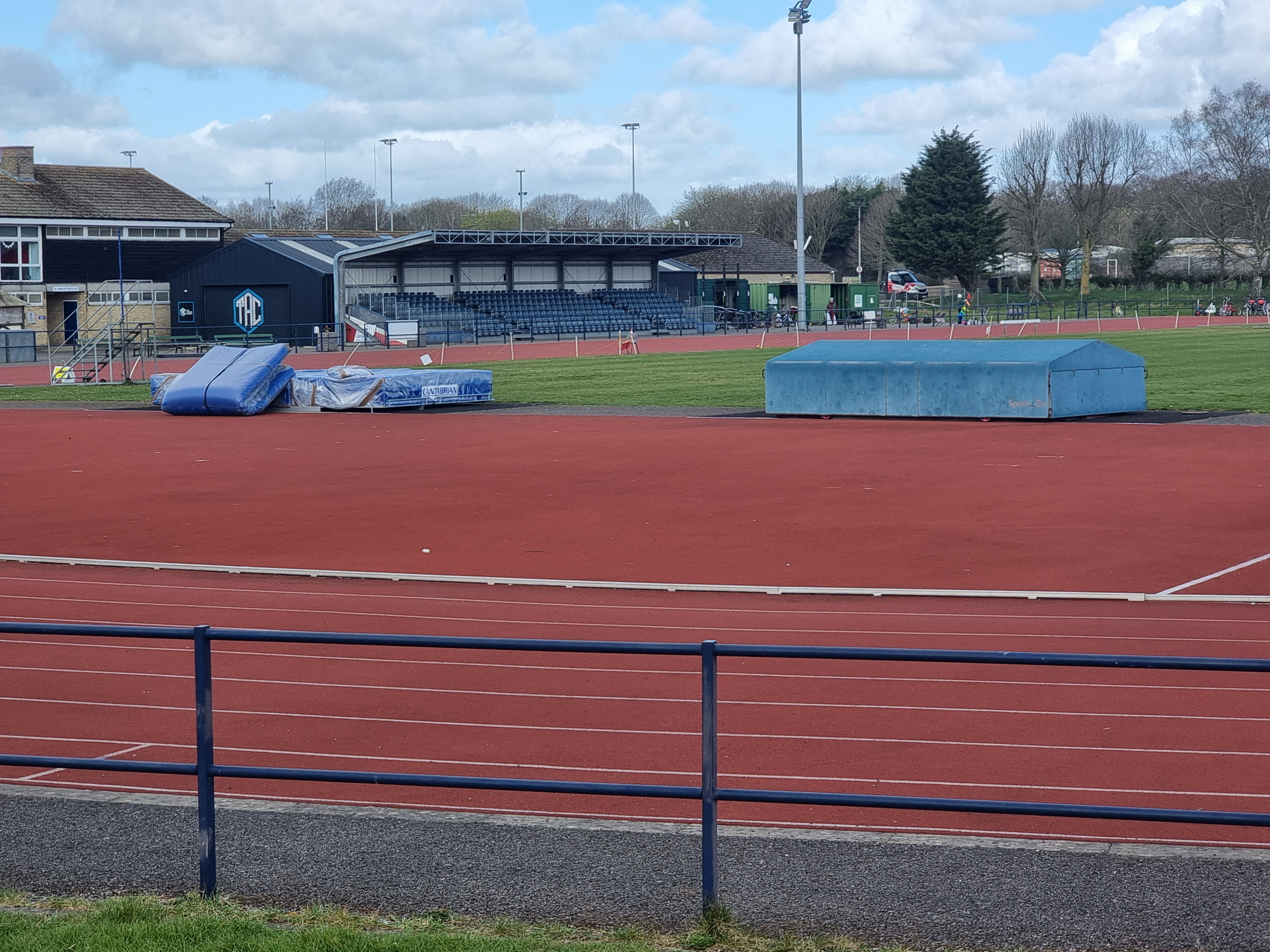
Horspath Sports Ground in 2025

The origins of the club come from the formation of the YMCA Athletics Club and the Oxford Harriers AAC. In 1944, Monty Hillier of the Harriers, formed the Oxford Ladies Athletic Club. The men's club followed in 1946, which then led to the amalgamation of the two clubs later that year, although the official merger did not take place until 1976.

Maureen Gardner represented the Oxford LAC during the 1948 Summer Olympics and won a silver medal in the 80 metres hurdles. Four years later in 1952, Diane Coates competed at the 1952 Summer Olympics.

Training was at the Iffley Road track (famous for Roger Bannister's first four minute mile). However, the ladies section moved to Barracks Lane and then to the current site at Horspath, which was built in the 1960s. The men continued at Iffley Road until 1976 when the official merger took place in 1976. The first synthetic track was laid at Horspath in 1996.

== Notable athletes ==
=== Olympians ===
Athlete	Events	Games	Medals/Ref
Maureen Gardner	80m hurdles, 4x100m	1948	Silver medal
Diane Coates	javelin	1952	

=== Other ===
- Gemma Bridge, British 5,000m racewalking champion
- Nathan Douglas, triple jumper (5 times British champion & double European silver medallist)
- Hannah England, middle-distance runner (World Championship silver medallist)
- Lynn Gibson, 1994 and 1998 Commonwealth Games
- Marcia Marriott, 1979 national pentathlon champion
- Barbara Simmonds, 1982 Commonwealth Games bronze medallist in high jump
