= Polytechnic Stadium (London) =

Sports venue in London

The Polytechnic Stadium
- The 1938 grandstand (Historic England)
- Interactive map of The Polytechnic Stadium
- Location: Chiswick, London
- Coordinates: 51.4759°N 0.2685°W

Tenant
- Fulham RLFC (1985-1990)

The Polytechnic Stadium is a sports venue on Hartington Road, Chiswick, London. It is the centre piece of the Quintin Hogg Memorial Grounds (now known as University of Westminster Sports Grounds).

== History ==
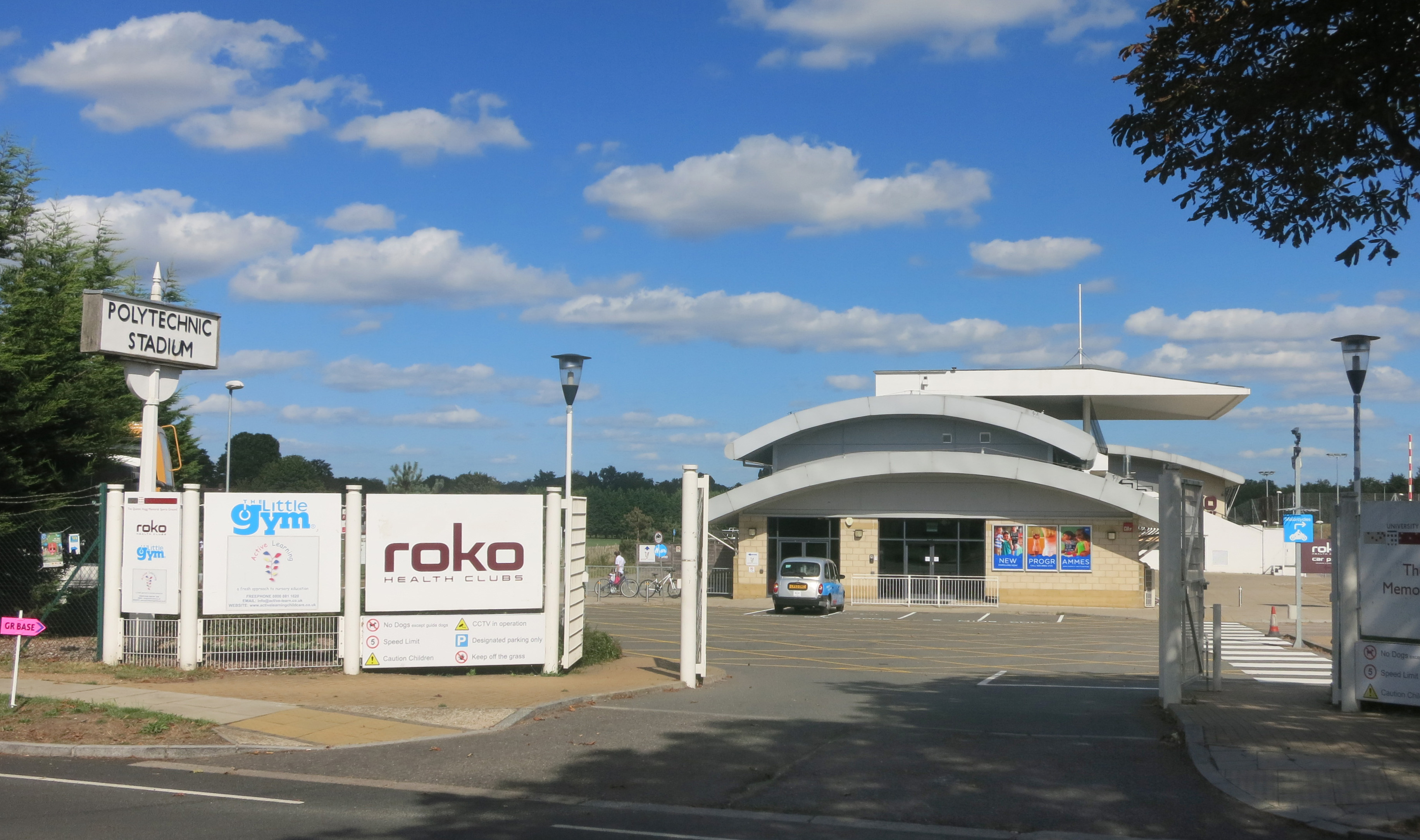
The stadium entrance in 2016

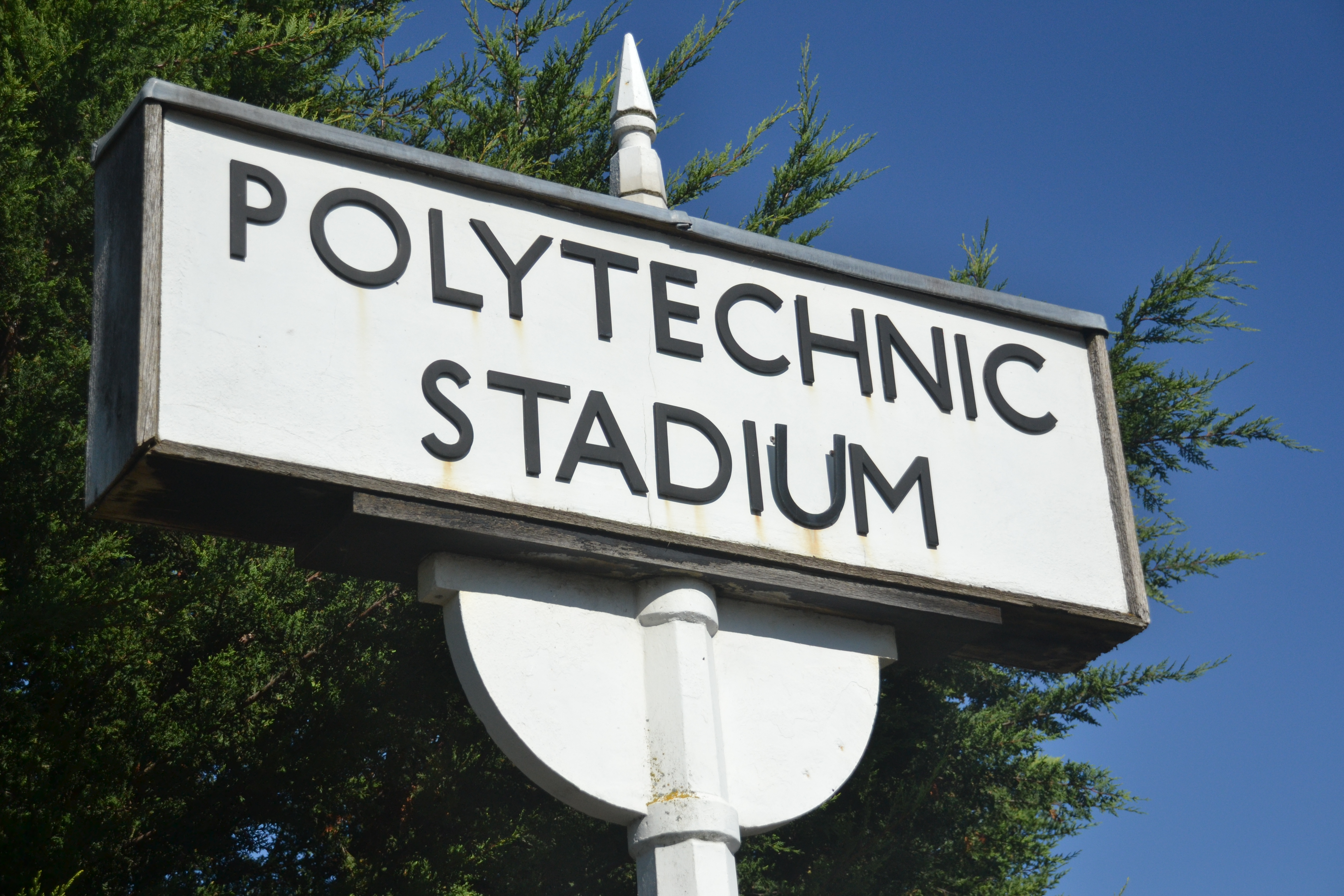
The sign

In 1888 Quintin Hogg built a boathouse near Chiswick Bridge, which is used at the finish of the university boat race each year. When Hogg died in 1903, an appeal to raise funds for a memorial in his memory took place. The Quintin and Alice Hogg Memorial was built and a piece of land in Chiswick was purchased. In 1936 plans were drawn up for a sports stadium to be built at the site. The design was undertaken by Joseph Addison, Head of Architecture at Regent Street Polytechnic. The stadium was home to the Polytechnic Harriers athletics club, along with several local clubs and schools. It was also used for international and national competitions as soon as it was built.

In 1938 the sports ground was extended for the stadium to be built by 7.5 acres. The grandstand had a capacity of 658 spectators and contained a restaurant on the first floor. In July 1944 the stadium suffered bomb damage with all the windows blown out and the running track damaged. Behind the stand there is a miniature railway.

The venue hosted the Women's Amateur Athletic Association Championships in 1947 and 1948.

From 1938 until 1973 the Polytechnic Marathon finished at the stadium. In the 1963 edition of the marathon a world record was set at the stadium by Leonard Edelen.

Primarily a track and field athletics venue, it hosted the field hockey preliminaries for the 1948 Summer Olympics.

The grandstand is now a Grade II listed structure, but is unused due to it not being able to meet modern health and safety criteria.

It was the home stadium of rugby league team Fulham RLFC (now the London Broncos) between 1985 and 1990.

== See also ==
- Polytechnic Harriers
