= Dora Gardner =

English athlete (1912–1994)

Personal information
- Nationality: British (English)
- Born: 6 May 1912 Croydon, South London, England
- Died: June 1994 (aged 82) Bournemouth, England
- Height: 167 cm (5 ft 6 in)
- Weight: 60 kg (132 lb)

Sport
- Sport: Athletics
- Event: high jump
- Club: Middlesex LAC
Medal record
Women's athletics
Representing England
British Empire Games
Silver medal – second place	1938 Sydney	High jump

Dora Kathleen Gardner (6 May 1912 – June 1994) was an English track and field athlete who competed for Great Britain in the 1948 Olympic Games.

== Biography ==
She was born in Croydon, South London. Gardner finished second behind Dorothy Odam in the high jump event at the 1937 WAAA Championships and the 1938 WAAA Championships. At the 1938 British Empire Games, she won the silver medal for England in the high jump event. In the long jump competition she finished seventh. Also in the 1938 European Athletics Championships she finished fifth in the high jump contest and in the 1946 European Championships in Athletics she finished seventh in the high jump event.

Gardner became the national high jump champion after winning the British WAAA Championships title at the 1945 WAAA Championships and 1946 WAAA Championships.

In 1948 she finished eighth in the Olympic high jump contest.

She died in Bournemouth.
