= Betty Lock =

British athlete (1921–1986)

Personal information
- Born: 7 May 1921 Surrey, England
- Died: July 1986 (aged 65) London, England

Sport
- Sport: Athletics
- Event: Sprints
- Club: Hercules AC; Mitcham AC
Medal record
Representing England
WAAA Championships
Gold medal – first place	1936 White City	60 metres
Gold medal – first place	1937 White City	60 metres
Gold medal – first place	1938 White City	60 metres
Gold medal – first place	1938 White City	100 metres
Gold medal – first place	1939 White City	60 metres
Gold medal – first place	1939 White City	100 metres

Dorothy Betty Lock (married name Brickwood) (7 May 1921 – July 1986) was a British athlete who specialised in the sprint disciplines and was a six-times British champion.

== Career ==
Lock won four consecutive 60 metres titles at the WAAA Championships.

Lock representing the Hercules Athletic Club, won her first title at the 1936 WAAA Championships and recorded a national record of 7.6 seconds over the 60 metres. She successfully retained her title at the 1937 WAAA Championships, before moving to the Mitcham Athletic Club.

Lock secured a double success at the 1938 WAAA Championships, winning both the 60 metres and equalling her own British record and becoming British 100 metres champion, setting a Championship record of 12.2 seconds. The following year in 1939, Lock retained both titles at the 1939 WAAA Championships and once again equalled her own 60 metres national record.

She married in 1944 and became Dorothy Brickwood. After World War II, she continued to race for Mitcham AC until 1950 and finished second behind Doris Batter in the 100 metres event at the 1949 WAAA Championships.
