= Barbara Burke =

British & South African sprint runner (1917-1998)

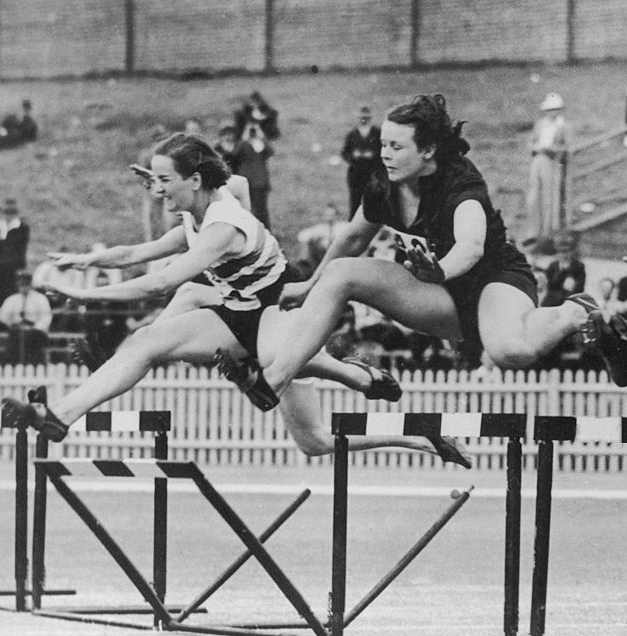
- Burke (right) at the 1938 British Empire Games

Personal information
- Nationality: British/South African
- Born: 13 May 1917 South Norwood, Greater London, England
- Died: 8 August 1998 (aged 81) Johannesburg, South Africa
- Height: 177 cm (5 ft 10 in)
- Weight: 63 kg (139 lb)

Sport
- Sport: Athletics
- Event(s): Sprints, hurdles
- Club: Mitcham Ladies AC

Achievements and titles
- Personal best(s): 100 m – 12.2 (1935); 200 m – 24.7 (1935); 80 mH – 11.6 (1937)
Medal record
Representing Great Britain
Olympic Games
Silver medal – second place	1936 Berlin	4×100 m relay
Representing South Africa
British Empire Games
Gold medal – first place	1938 Sydney	80 m hurdles

Barbara Hannah Anita Burke (13 May 1917 – 8 August 1998) was a British and South African sprint runner who competed for Great Britain in the 1936 Summer Olympics.

== Biography ==
Burke was a member of the South African relay team which finished fourth in the 110-220-110 yards relay. In the individual 100 and 220 yard events she was eliminated in the heats.

Burke won three British WAAA Championships titles in the 100 metres, 200 metres and 80 metres hurdles at the 1936 WAAA Championships.

Shortly afterwards at the 1936 Olympic Games in Berlin, Burke won a silver medal in the 4 × 100 m relay and placed fourth in a semi-final of the individual 100 m event.

Burke won another WAAA 80 metres hurdles title at the 1937 WAAA Championships and at the 1938 British Empire Games, she competed for South Africa and won the 80 metres hurdles contest. In the 100 and 220 yard sprint events she finished fourth and fifth respectively.
