= Doris Batter =

British sprinter (1929–2002)

Personal information
- Nationality: British (English)
- Born: 22 April 1929 Brentford, Middlesex
- Died: 23 April 2002 (aged 73) Hampshire, England

Sport
- Sport: Sprinting
- Event: Sprints
- Club: London Olympiades AC
Medal record
Athletics
Representing England
British Empire Games
Silver medal – second place	1950 Auckland	660 yard relay

Doris M. Batter (married name Hatton) (22 April 1929 – 23 April 2002) was a British sprinter, who competed at the 1948 Summer Olympics.

== Career ==
Batter competed in the women's 100 metres at the 1948 Olympic Games in London. She won her heat before being eliminated in the first semi-final.

Batter won two consecutive 60 metres titles at the prestigious WAAA Championships. She won her first AAA title and became British champion at the 1948 WAAA Championships over the 60 metres. The following year, the London Olympiades Athletics Club member successfully retained her 60 metres title at the 1949 WAAA Championships.

Batter also represented England and won a silver medal in the 660 yards relay at the 1950 British Empire Games in Auckland, New Zealand.

She married Leonard Hatton in 1951.
