= Joan Shepherd =

British long jumper

Personal information
- Nationality: British (English)
- Born: 5 May 1924
- Died: 24 November 2012 (aged 88)
- Height: 157 cm (5 ft 2 in)
- Weight: 47 kg (104 lb)

Sport
- Sport: Athletics
- Event: Long jump
- Club: Essex Ladies AC

Joan Constance Evelyn Shepherd (5 May 1924 – 24 November 2012) was a British athlete who competed at the 1948 Summer Olympics.

== Biography ==
Shepherd finished third behind Winifred Jordan in the 200 metres event at the 1945 WAAA Championships and second behind Kathleen Duffy at the 1947 WAAA Championships.

Shepherd finally became the national long jump champion after winning the British WAAA Championships title at the 1948 WAAA Championships.

Shortly afterwards, representing Great Britain at the 1948 Olympic Games in London, she competed in the women's long jump competition.
