= Sutton and District Athletics Club =

British athletic club

- Founded: 1920/1985
- Ground: David Weir Leisure Centre
- Location: Middleton Road, Carshalton, south London, Surrey SM5 1SL, England
- Coordinates: 51°23′04″N 0°10′57″W
- Website: official website

Sutton and District Athletics Club, is an athletics club based in Carshalton, England. The club was officially founded in 1985 but has much earlier origins. The club trains on Tuesday and Thursday evenings.

== History ==
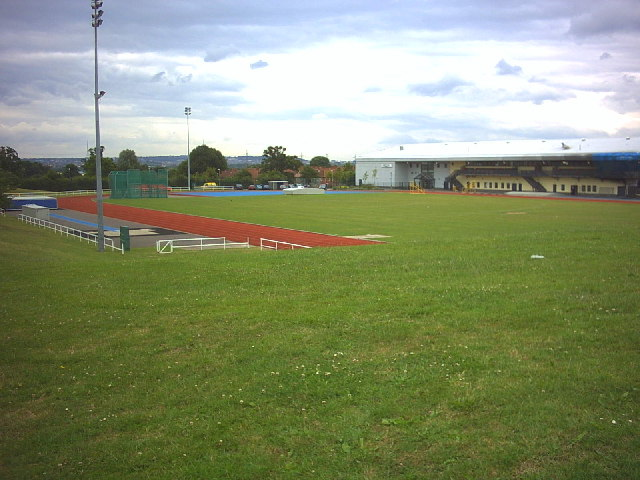
The athletics arena in 2005

The origins of the club began with the formation of Mitcham AC in 1920. The club actively encouraged female athletes, which led to it being one of the early pioneer clubs to include women, although women's only clubs such as London Olympiades Athletic Club were formed the following year in 1921.

In 1938 Mitcham AC won the English National Cross Country Championships.

The club raced at the News of the World track (the modern day Canons Recreation Ground) before moving to the Carshalton Sports Arena from 1960.

A second club called Sutton and Cheam Harriers were based at Sutton United F.C.'s ground Gander Green Lane and in 1985 merged with Mitcham AC to become the Sutton and District Athletics Club.

In February 2003, the arena was redeveloped, with funding from Sport England, the lottery, the Sutton Council and the London Marathon Trust and a new opening ceremony was performed.

== Honours ==
- English National Cross Country Championships team winners: 1938 (men), 1963 (women)

== Notable athletes ==
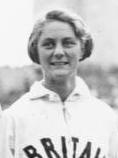
Dorothy Odam-Tyler won two silver medals

=== Olympians (or Olympiad) athletes ===
Athlete	Club	Events	Games	Medals/Pos, Ref
Muriel Gunn Cornell	Mitcham AC	long jump	1926, 1930	
Dorothy Odam-Tyler	Mitcham AC	high jump	1936, 1948, 1952, 1956	Silver medal Silver medal
Bevis Reid	Mitcham AC	shot put, discus	1948	
Brian Hewson	Mitcham AC	800m, 1500m	1956—1960	
Anne Smith	Mitcham AC	800m	1964	
Andrea Lynch	Mitcham AC	100m, 4 × 100 m relay	1972, 1976, 1980	
Ros Few	Mitcham AC	high jump	1972	
Judy Vernon	Mitcham AC	100m hurdles, 4 × 100 m relay	1972	
Harry Aikines-Aryeetey	Sutton & District AC	4 × 100 m relay	2016	
Imani-Lara Lansiquot	Sutton & District AC	4 × 100 m relay	2020	Bronze medal
