= Maureen Gardner =

British athlete (1928–1974)

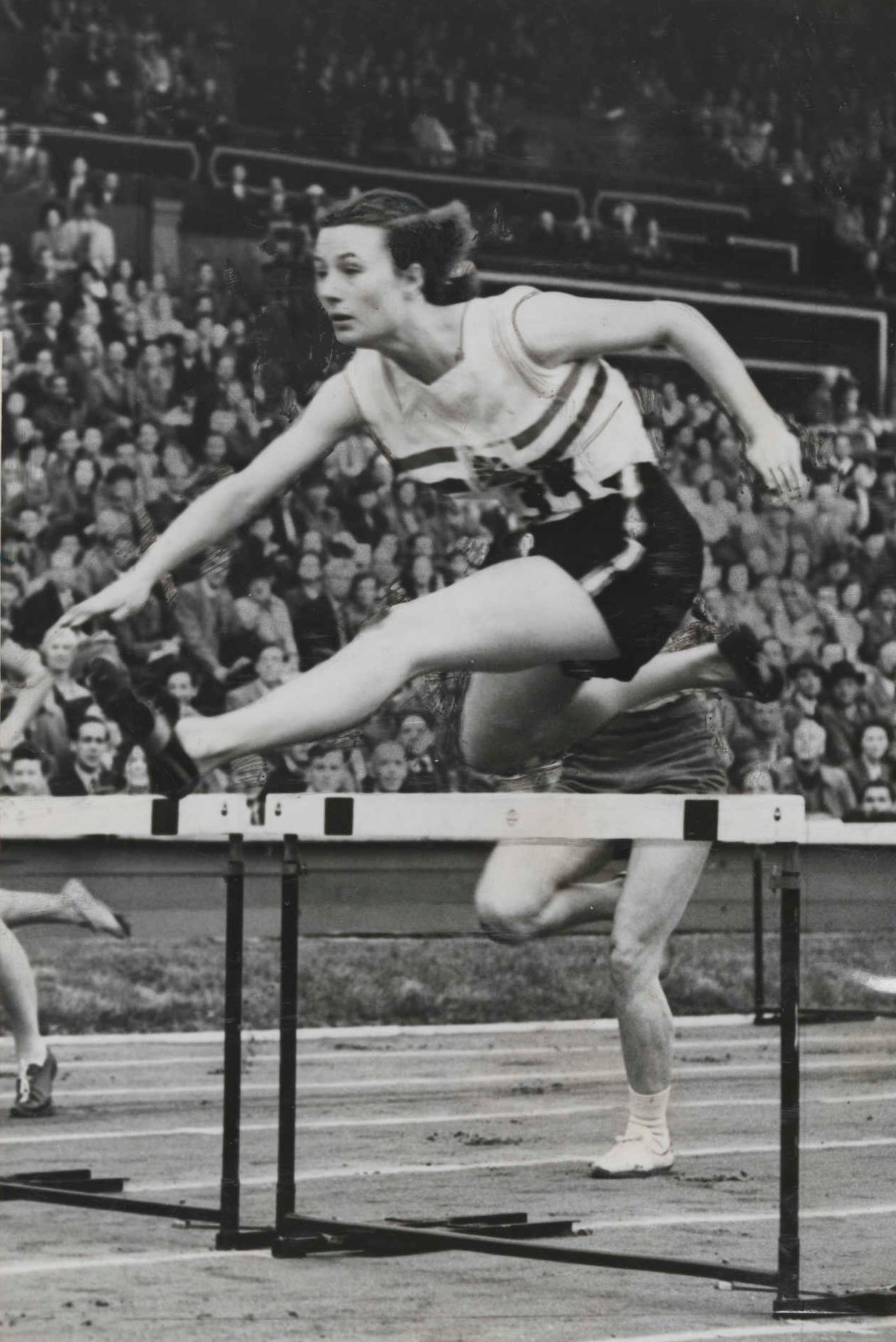
- Gardner at the 1948 Olympics

Personal information
- Born: Maureen Angela Jane Gardner; 12 November 1928 Oxford, England
- Died: 2 September 1974 (aged 45) North Stoneham, England
- Height: 1.72 m (5 ft 8 in)
- Weight: 59 kg (130 lb)

Sport
- Sport: Hurdles
- Club: Oxford LAC
Medal record
Women's athletics
Representing Great Britain
Olympic Games
| Silver medal – second place | 1948 London | 80 m hurdles |
European Championships
| Silver medal – second place | 1950 Brussels | 80 m hurdles |

Maureen Angela Jane Dyson (née Gardner, 12 November 1928 – 2 September 1974) was a British athlete who competed mainly in the 80 metres hurdles. She won silver medals at the 1948 Summer Olympics and 1950 European Athletics Championships, both times losing to Fanny Blankers-Koen. She was coached by Geoff Dyson, whom she married one month after the 1948 Olympics.

Maureen Gardner grew up in the Florence Park area of Temple Cowley, Oxford, and went to Donnington Junior School, Florence Park, Oxford. Her former home at 17 Maidcroft Road now has a blue plaque in her honour.

== Running ==
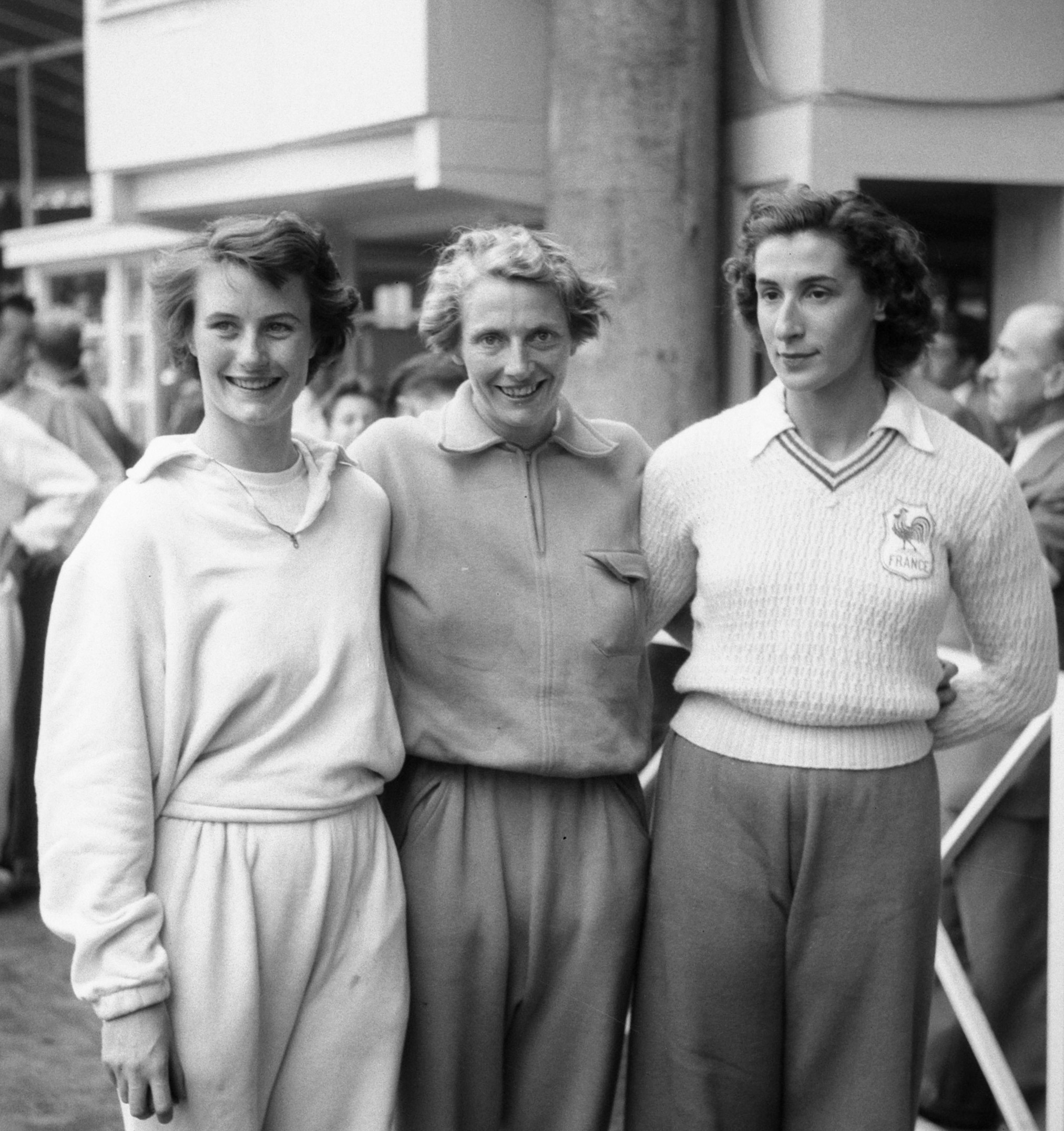
Maureen Gardner, Fanny Blankers-Koen and Micheline Ostermeyer – the 80 m hurdle medalists of the 1950 European Championships

Gardner became the national 100 metres champion after winning the British WAAA Championships title at the 1946 WAAA Championships. The following month, Gardner competed in flat running at the 1946 European Athletics Championships and finished fourth in the 4 × 100 m relay (with Sylvia Cheeseman, Winifred Jordan and Joyce Judd) and fifth in the 100 m sprint.

At the 1948 Summer Olympics she came second in the 80 metre hurdles to Fanny Blankers-Koen, both of them recording the same time of 11.2 seconds. She also helped Great Britain place fourth in the 4 × 100 m relay. Two years later she again lost the 80 metre hurdles to Blankers-Koen at the 1950 European Athletics Championships. In addition to her 1946 national 100 metres title, Gardner was four time WAAA national 80 metres hurdles champion (1947, 1948, 1950, 1951).

== Ballet schools ==
She started a ballet and dance school in Oxford. On moving to London she started a new school in Wanstead, and both of them continued for a number of years until, in 1962, the Dyson family moved to live in Ottawa, Ontario, Canada. She founded another school in that city.

Maureen's involvement with ballet when she returned to England from 1968 onwards, was mainly as an examiner for the Royal Ballet School. Two years before she died of cancer she was made the Chief Examiner of that organisation.

== Family ==
Gardner married Geoff Dyson at St Mary Magdalen's Church, Oxford, and they had two children. Her son was born in 1949, and after his birth she started training again with the 1952 Summer Olympics as her goal; but when she became pregnant again, she decided to retire from her athletics career. She died from cancer on 2 September 1974, aged 45, and is buried at Winchester's Magdalen Hill cemetery alongside Geoff
