= Jean Pickering =

British track and field athlete

Jean Pickering MBE
Personal information
- Nationality: British (English)
- Born: Jean Catherine Desforges; 4 July 1929 Forest Gate, London, England
- Died: 25 March 2013 (aged 83)

Sport
- Sport: Athletics
- Events: Sprints, long jump, hurdles
- Club: Essex Ladies AC
Medal record
Women's athletics
Representing Great Britain
Olympic Games
Bronze medal – third place	1952 Helsinki	4×100 m
European Championships
Gold medal – first place	1950 Brussels	4×100 m
Gold medal – first place	1954 Berne	Long jump
Representing England
Commonwealth Games
Bronze medal – third place	1954 Vancouver	Long jump
Bronze medal – third place	1954 Vancouver	80 m hurdles

Jean Catherine Pickering MBE (née Desforges; 4 July 1929 – 25 March 2013) was a female track and field athlete from Great Britain, who competed mainly in the 80 metres hurdles and long jump.

She won bronze medals at the Olympics and the Commonwealth Games and is the only British woman to have won gold medals at the European Athletics Championships in both a track and a field event (4 × 100 m relay in 1950, long jump in 1954). During her career she set British records in the women's pentathlon and the long jump.

She and her husband, Ron Pickering, had a lasting impact on British athletics, particularly through the Ron Pickering Memorial Fund, which provides support to young track and field athletes. Their son, Shaun Pickering, became an Olympian and a Commonwealth Games medallist, competing in the shot put.

== Athletics career ==
Born in Forest Gate, London, she made her international debut at the age of eighteen, competing in the 80 m hurdles. She represented Great Britain at the 1952 Summer Olympics held in Helsinki, Finland, where she finished fifth in the 80 m hurdles and won the 4 × 100 metres relay bronze medal with her teammates Sylvia Cheeseman, June Foulds and Heather Armitage.

In 1953, Jean Desforges broke a British record and became the first British woman to long jump over 20 feet, when jumping 6.10 m in Nienburg, Germany.

In the 1950 European Championships in Brussels, Desforges finished fifth in the 80 m hurdles and was part of the gold medal-winning 4 × 100 m relay team. She was European Champion in the long jump, in the 1954 European Championships in Berne, Switzerland, with a leap of 6.04 m. At the same championships Desforges finished sixth in the 80 m hurdles. She remains the only British athlete to have won a European gold medal in both a track and a field event.

In the 1954 Commonwealth Games in Vancouver, Canada, Desforges won a bronze medal in both the long jump and 80 m hurdles.

Desforges was an eight-time WAAA Championships winner, having won the 80 metres hurdles title four times (1949, 1952, 1953 and 1954), the long jump title twice (1953 and 1954), and the pentathlon title twice (1953 and 1954).

She ended her career with personal bests of 11.1 seconds for both the 100-yard dash and the 80 m hurdles. She also broke the British record for the pentathlon in her career, accumulating a total of 3997 points in 1953.

== Family and foundation ==
She married Ron Pickering, a prominent athletics coach and television commentator, on 23 October 1954, in Forest Gate, London. The couple had two children, a daughter (Kim) in 1958, and a son (Shaun Pickering) in 1961 who went on to athletic success in his own right.

Her husband's death in 1991 led her to create the Ron Pickering Memorial Fund to help support athletics in Britain at a grass-roots level. By 2013, the Memorial Fund had given out £2.0 million in grants to young athletes, coaches and athletics groups. Such was the breadth of the fund's support, around 75% of the British track and field team had been Ron Picking Memorial Fund grant recipients earlier in their career, among them Olympic champions Mo Farah, Jessica Ennis, Christine Ohuruogu and Greg Rutherford.

She was appointed a Member of the Order of the British Empire (MBE) in the 2010 New Years Honours List for her services to athletics. She was inducted into the England Athletics Hall of Fame in 2011. Her passion for the sport remained until the end of her life – she suffered from poor health due to a heart condition in her last years but focused on being present for the Athletics at the 2012 London Olympics. She died aged 83 on 25 March 2013.
