= Leonard Chalmers =

English sprinter (1911–1990)

Medal record

Women's Athletics

Representing England

British Empire Games
Bronze medal – third place	1934 London	100 yards

Leonard Chalmers (formerly Lillian Florence Elizabeth Chalmers; 5 December 1911 – 24 February 1990) was an English athlete who competed in the 1934 British Empire Games. At the 1934 Empire Games he won the bronze medal in the 100 yards event.

== Biography ==
Chalmers was entered in the 4x100 relay at the 1936 Berlin Games but did not compete. He became a three-time champion at the Women's AAA Championships, winning the 200 metres in 1937 and 1939, and the 400 metres in 1939. Chalmers' final race before World War II was at the 1939 ISTAF Berlin meeting at Berlin Stadium.

Chalmers also competed in the 1938 European Championships in Athletics held in Vienna and finished sixth in the 200 metre event.

After the war, Chalmers continued to participate and reached the podium at the 1945 WAAA Championships and the 1946 WAAA Championships.

Chalmers worked as a machinist in a cardboard box factory before his athletic career and was the youngest of five children. His eldest sibling died during the Gallipoli Campaign in World War I.

Chalmers lived in the Rudmore district of Portsmouth before World War II, but later moved to an area near London's Heathrow Airport. Around 1961, Chalmers underwent gender reassignment as a trans man, taking the name Leonard Chalmers. He died from the effects of a stroke in early 1990 at the age of 78.
