= Ethel Raby =

English track and field athlete

Ethel Davies (née Ethel Raby)
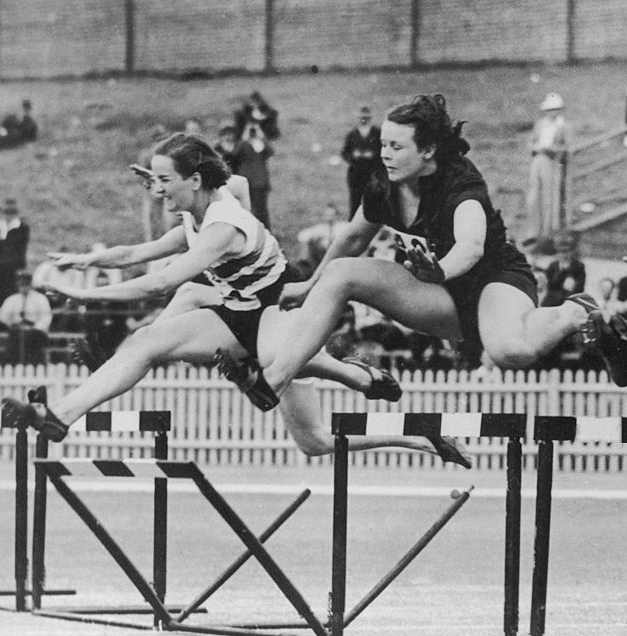
- Raby (left) at the 1938 British Empire Games

Personal information
- Born: 8 October 1914 London
- Died: 30 March 2008 (aged 93) Wellington, New Zealand

Sport
- Sport: Athletics
- Event(s): Sprint, hurdles, long jump
- Club: Middlesex Ladies' Athletic Club

Achievements and titles
- Personal best: LJ – 5.80 m (1937)
Medal record
Representing England
British Empire Games
Silver medal – second place	1938 Sydney	Long jump
Silver medal – second place	1938 Sydney	4×110/220 yd

Ethel Mabel Raby, married name Davies (8 October 1914 – 30 March 2008), was an English athlete who competed in the 1938 British Empire Games.

== Biography ==
At the 1938 British Empire Games, Raby won silver medals in the long jump and 220-110-220-110 yards relay; in the 100 yards and 80 metre hurdles events she was eliminated in the heats. Later that year she competed in the 1938 European Championships in Athletics and finished fourth in the long jump.

Raby married swimmer Goldup Davies in late 1939. Davies also competed at the same 1938 British Empire Games and was an Olympian in 1948.

Raby became the national long jump champion after winning won the British WAAA Championships title at the 1935 WAAA Championships. She went on to successfully defend her title every year from 1936 to 1939 and regained the title at the 1946 WAAA Championships.
