= Bevis Reid =

British track and field athlete (1919–1997)

Bevis Shergold (née Reid)
Personal information
- Born: 13 June 1919 Edinburgh, Scotland
- Died: 4 July 1997 (aged 78) Richmond, London, England

Sport
- Sport: Athletics
- Events: Discus throw, shot put and javelin
- Club: Mitcham AC
Medal record
Shot put at the AAA Championships
Gold medal – first place	1938	Women's Shot put
Gold medal – first place	1939	Women's Shot put
Gold medal – first place	1947	Women's Shot put
Gold medal – first place	1948	Women's Shot put
Gold medal – first place	1949	Women's Shot put
Gold medal – first place	1951	Women's Shot put

Bevis Maria Anael Shergold (née Reid, 13 June 1919 – 4 July 1997) was a British track and field athlete who competed in the 1938 European Athletics Championships and the 1948 Summer Olympics.

== Athletic career ==
Reid was a member of the Mitcham Athletics Club in London. By the time she was 19 years old she had unofficially broken the British record in the discus and the javelin. She competed in both the shot put and the discus at the 1938 European Athletics Championships held in Vienna, finishing in fifth place in the shot put and eighth place in the discus.

Due to the war Reid had to wait ten years before she could compete in the Summer Olympics, where she threw 35.84 metres in the discus and finished in 14th place. She fared better in the shot put, finishing in third place in the qualifying round, but could only throw 12.170 metres in the final to finish in eighth place.

Reid won the national shot put title (two-hand aggregate, 8lb shot) at the WAAA Championships on six occasions and was five times national discus champion. In addition she also won the javelin title at the 1948 WAAA Championships.

== Personal life ==
During World War II she was an intelligence servicewoman and was one of the first women to be posted aboard. She worked in Egypt and Algeria as a translator during the interrogation of POWs.

She married Harold Taplin Shergold, a senior officer in the Secret Intelligence Service, responsible for handling Oleg Penkovsky and unmasking George Blake.
