= Sylvia Cheeseman =

English sprinter

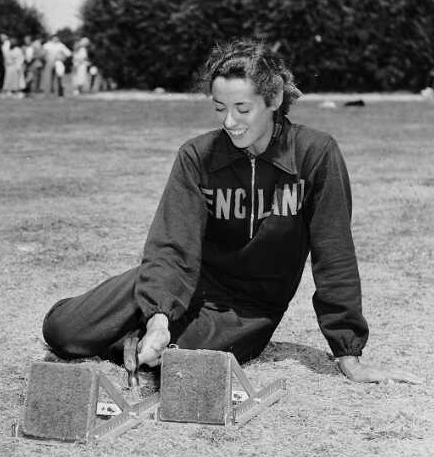
- Cheeseman hammering her starting blocks into place at the 1950 British Empire Games

Personal information
- Nationality: British (English)
- Born: 19 May 1929 (age 97) Richmond, London, England
- Height: 171 cm (5 ft 7 in)
- Weight: 63 kg (139 lb)

Sport
- Sport: Athletics
- Event: Sprint
- Club: Spartan Ladies
- Coached by: Sandy Duncan

Achievements and titles
- Personal best(s): 100 m – 12.0 (1954); 200 m – 24.4 (1949)
Medal record
Representing Great Britain
Olympic Games
Bronze medal – third place	1952 Helsinki	4×100 m
Representing England
Commonwealth Games
Silver medal – second place	1950 Auckland	660 yards relay
Bronze medal – third place	1950 Auckland	440 yards relay

Sylvia Cheeseman (born 19 May 1929) is an English retired sprinter who won a bronze medal at the 1952 Summer Olympics.

== Biography ==
Cheeseman's mother was a concert pianist, her father was a double bass player and a founding member of the Royal Philharmonic Orchestra, and her sister was an international model. She lived on Derwent Road, in Whitton, London. She attended Spring Grove Grammar School.

Cheeseman became the national 200 metres champion after winning the British WAAA Championships title at the 1946 WAAA Championships. She would go on to win the same title another five times from 1947 to 1952.

At the 1948 Olympic Games in London, represeting Great Britain, she was eliminated in the semi-finals of the 200 metres competition.

Competing in relays, she won two medals for England at the 1950 British Empire Games.

In the 1952 Olympics she won her heat but was eliminated in the semi-final.

In 1957 she married the Olympic runner John Disley; they had two daughters. After retiring from competitions, she worked as a freelance journalist in China and all around Europe.
