= Dorothy Tyler-Odam =

British athlete

Dorothy Tyler MBE (née Odam)
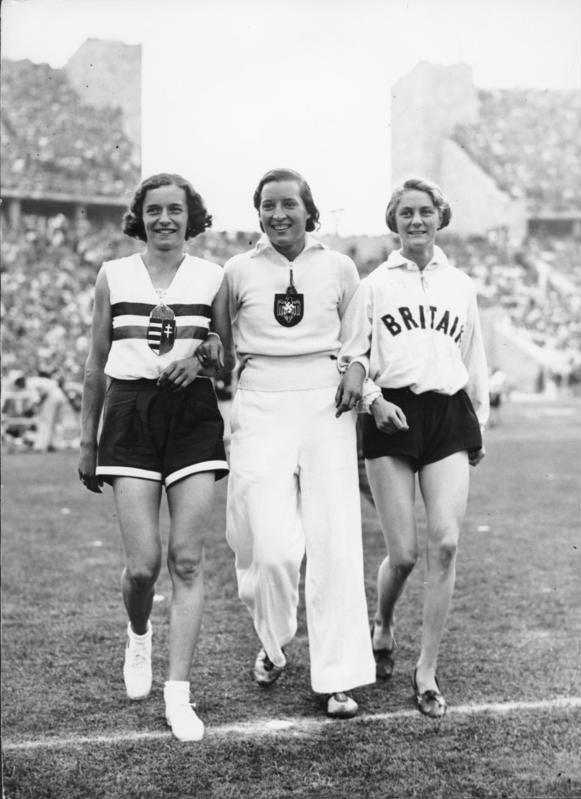
- Ibolya Csák, Elfriede Kaun and Dorothy Odam at the 1936 Olympics.

Personal information
- Nationality: British (English)
- Born: 14 March 1920 Stockwell, London, England
- Died: 25 September 2014 (aged 94) Long Melford, England

Sport
- Sport: Athletics
- Event: high jump
- Club: Mitcham AC
Medal record
Women's athletics
Representing Great Britain
Olympic Games
Silver medal – second place	1936 Berlin	High jump
Silver medal – second place	1948 London	High jump
European Championships
Silver medal – second place	1950 Brussels	High jump
Representing England
British Empire Games
Gold medal – first place	1938 Sydney	High jump
Gold medal – first place	1950 Auckland	High jump
British Empire and Commonwealth Games
Silver medal – second place	1954 Vancouver	High jump

Dorothy Jennifer Beatrice Tyler, MBE (née Odam; 14 March 1920 – 25 September 2014) was a British athlete who competed mainly in the high jump.

== Biography ==
She was born in Stockwell, London. Odam competed for Great Britain in the 1936 Summer Olympics held in Berlin, Germany, where she won the silver medal behind Ibolya Csák. She jumped the highest and was the first to clear 1.60 meters, and would have won under modern countback rules, but under the 1936 rulebook a jump-off was called for, and Csák won the gold.

Shortly before the 1936 Olympic Games, Odam won her first British WAAA Championships title, becoming the national high jump champion at the 1936 WAAA Championships. She would go on to win another seven national high jump titles, spanning from 1936 until 1956.

In 1939 she broke the world record in the high jump with 1.66m, but Germany's Dora Ratjen allegedly broke her record quickly. Odam was suspicious of Ratjen and, according to Odam, "They wrote to me telling me I didn't hold the record, so I wrote to them saying, 'She's not a woman, she's a man'. They did some research and found 'her' serving as a waiter called Hermann Ratjen. So I got my world record back." Odam's world record was formally recognized by the sport's world governing body, the IAAF, in 1957.

She won the silver medal again representing Great Britain in the 1948 Summer Olympics in London, making her the only woman to win Olympic athletics medals before and after the war. Her 1936 win also made her the first British woman to win an individual Olympic medal in athletics.

Odam was also twice a gold medallist at the British Empire Games, winning at Sydney in 1938 and Auckland in 1950. In Sydney she was the only Englishwoman to win athletics gold, setting a Games record of 5 ft 3 in, which is the same as 1.60 meters.

She was appointed Member of the Order of the British Empire (MBE) in the 2002 New Year Honours for services to athletics.

In 2012, she was the official starter for the London Marathon.

She died on 25 September 2014 aged 94 following a long illness.
