= WAAA Championships =

British athletics competition

- Sport: Track and field
- Founded: 1922
- Folded: 2006
- Country: England/United Kingdom

The WAAA Championships was an annual track and field competition organised by the Women's Amateur Athletic Association (WAAA) in England. It was the foremost domestic athletics event for women during its lifetime.

== History ==
Since 1880, the Amateur Athletic Association of England had held the AAA Championships, but it admitted men only and did not wish to include women. Women's clubs and competitions were typically separate from the men's and in line with growing interest in the sport the WAAA was founded in 1922. Several contests in the country were approved by the WAAA with "Championships of England" status that year, and this was subsequently replaced with an organised WAAA Championships in 1923. Aside from the 1927 championships in Reading, Berkshire, the WAAA track and field event was based at various locations in London up to 1939. The competition was interrupted by World War II but was re-instigated in 1945 and remained in London until a move to Birmingham in 1985.

As women's athletics developed in the 20th century, major international men's and women's events typically were held in conjunction, with women first appearing on the Olympic athletics programme in 1928 and the European Athletics Championships being fully combined by its third edition in 1946. The AAA and WAAA events remained divided for much longer and it was not until 1988 that the women's events were merged into an all-gender AAA Championships in 1988, though the WAAA remained the organiser of the women's events. This change came during a period of reform that would see the sport fully professionalise and, in the UK, organisation move to national level.

The establishment of UK Athletics in 1999 to serve as the national governing body for professional, elite athletics ultimately started the decline of the AAA Championships. UK Athletics took over the role of both national championships and international team selection with its own British Athletics Championships from 2007 onwards.

The long-distance track events, marathon, racewalking events and combined track and field events were regularly held outside of the main track and field championship competition.

== Events ==
The following athletics events featured as standard on the main WAAA Championships programme:

- 100 metres, 200 metres, 400 metres, 800 metres, 1500 metres, 3000 metres (until 1999) 5000 metres, 100 metres hurdles, 400 metres hurdles, 3000 metres steeplechase, long jump, triple jump, high jump, pole vault, shot put, discus, hammer and javelin.

The following events were regularly held, but often outside of the main programme:

- 10,000 metres, pentathlon/heptathlon, 5000 metres walk, 10,000 metres walk and marathon

Races were contested, and field events measured, in yards and feet up until 1968. The 2000 metres steeplechase was held in 2002 and 2003 before moving to the standard 3000 m distance. The 80 metres hurdles was contested until 1968 before being replaced by the new international standard 100 metres hurdles. The 200 metres hurdles was on the programme from 1961 to 1972, before being dropped in favour of the 400 metres hurdles. A 60 metres event was available from 1935 to 1950. A women's mile run was first contested in 1936, indicating a growing acceptance to women taking part in distance events. The 3000 metres was introduced in 1968 and lasted until 1999. The standard 5000 metres and 10,000 metres events came after, being first held in 1980 as non-championship events before achieving full status.

The field events expanded roughly in line with international changes. The triple jump first appeared in 1989, followed by championship events in pole vault and hammer throw in 1993, bringing women to parity with men in field events. A women's pentathlon (first held in 1949) was replaced with a heptathlon in 1981.

Racewalking events underwent progressive change in distance, from 880 yards (1923–1927), to one mile (1928–1932), rounded down to 1600 m in 1933 to 1939, back to one mile (1945–1958), up to 1.5 miles (1960–68), then 2500 m (1969–1972), 3000 m in 1973 and 1974, before finally reaching the 5000 m distance in 1975. A 10,000 m walk was introduced in 1978. A variety of relay races were contested by clubs prior to 1960.

== Editions ==
#	Year	Date	Venue	Stadium	Notes/ref
—	1922	n/a	Various	Various	Championships status provided to several events
1	1923	18 August	London	Bromley, Oxo Sports Ground	
2	1924	28 June	London	Woolwich Stadium, Woolwich Common	Discus added
3	1925	11 July	London	Stamford Bridge	
4	1926	19 June	London	Stamford Bridge	
5	1927	9 July	Reading	Palmer Park	
6	1928	14 July	London	Stamford Bridge	Single handed javelin introduced
7	1929	13 July	London	Stamford Bridge	
8	1930	16 August	London	Stamford Bridge	single hand shot introduced
9	1931	11 July	London	Stamford Bridge	
10	1932	9 July	London	Stamford Bridge	
11	1933	15 July	London	White City Stadium	
12	1934	30 June	London	Herne Hill Athletics Ground	
13	1935	10 August	London	White City Stadium	60 metres sprint introduced
14	1936	18 July	London	White City Stadium	1 mile introduced
15	1937	7 August	London	White City Stadium	
16	1938	2 July	London	White City Stadium	
17	1939	22 July	London	White City Stadium	
Not held 1940 to 1944 due to World War II
18	1945	18 August	London	Tooting Bec Athletics Track	
19	1946	13 July	London	White City Stadium	
20	1947	2 August	London	Polytechnic Stadium	
21	1948	26 June	London	Polytechnic Stadium	
22	1949	9 July	London	White City Stadium	Pentathlon introduced
23	1950	8 July	London	White City Stadium	
24	1951	7 July	London	White City Stadium	60 metres discontinued
25	1952	14 June	London	White City Stadium	
26	1953	4 July	London	White City Stadium	
27	1954	19 June	London	White City Stadium	
28	1955	2 July	London	White City Stadium	
29	1956	11 August	London	White City Stadium	
30	1957	5–6 July	London	White City Stadium	Held over 2 days for the first time
31	1958	7 June	London	Motspur Park	
32	1959	4 July	London	Motspur Park	
33	1960	1–2 July	London	White City Stadium	
34	1961	8 July	London	White City Stadium	200 metres hurdles introduced
35	1962	7 July	London	White City Stadium	
36	1963	6 July	London	White City Stadium	100 metres hurdles introduced over a height of 2'6"
37	1964	4 July	London	White City Stadium	
38	1965	3 July	London	White City Stadium	
39	1966	1–2 July	London	White City Stadium	
40	1967	30 June–1 July	London	White City Stadium	Last event at White City, 100m hurdle height increased to 2'9"
41	1968	19–20 July	London	Crystal Palace National Sports Centre	Imperial distances replaced with metric distances, 3,000m introduced
42	1969	18–19 July	London	Crystal Palace National Sports Centre	80 metres hurdles discontinued
43	1970	19–20 June	London	Crystal Palace National Sports Centre	
44	1971	16–17 July	London	Crystal Palace National Sports Centre	
45	1972	7–8 July	London	Crystal Palace National Sports Centre	
46	1973	20–21 July	London	Crystal Palace National Sports Centre	200 metres hurdles increased to 400 metres hurdles, 2,500 metres walk increased to 3,000 metres
47	1974	19–20 July	London	Crystal Palace National Sports Centre	
48	1975	18–19 July	London	Crystal Palace National Sports Centre	3,000m walk increased to 5,000m
49	1976	20–21 August	London	Crystal Palace National Sports Centre	
50	1977	19–20 August	London	Crystal Palace National Sports Centre	
51	1978	18–19 August	London	Crystal Palace National Sports Centre	Marathon and 10,000 metres walk introduced
52	1979	27–28 July	London	Crystal Palace National Sports Centre	
53	1980	15–16 August	London	Crystal Palace National Sports Centre	5,000 metres and 10,000 metres introduced
54	1981	24–25 July	London	Crystal Palace National Sports Centre	
55	1982	30–31 July	London	Crystal Palace National Sports Centre	
56	1983	29–30 July	London	Crystal Palace National Sports Centre	
57	1984	15–16 June	London	Crystal Palace National Sports Centre	
58	1985	26–27 July	Birmingham	Alexander Stadium	
59	1986	6–7 June	Birmingham	Alexander Stadium	
60	1987	24–25 July	Birmingham	Alexander Stadium	
—	1988	5–7 August	Birmingham	Alexander Stadium	Olympic trials
—	1989	11–13 August	Birmingham	Alexander Stadium	Triple jump introduced
—	1990	3–4 August	Birmingham	Alexander Stadium	
—	1991	26–27 July	Birmingham	Alexander Stadium	Hammer throw introduced
—	1992	27–28 July	Birmingham	Alexander Stadium	Olympic trials
—	1993	16–17 July	Birmingham	Alexander Stadium	Pole vault introduced
—	1994	11–12 July	Sheffield	Don Valley Stadium	
—	1995	15–16 July	Birmingham	Alexander Stadium	
—	1996	14–16 July	Birmingham	Alexander Stadium	Olympic trials
—	1997	24–25 July	Birmingham	Alexander Stadium	
—	1998	24–26 July	Birmingham	Alexander Stadium	
—	1999	23–25 July	Birmingham	Alexander Stadium	New javelin model introduced
—	2000	11–13 July	Birmingham	Alexander Stadium	Olympic trials
—	2001	13–15 July	Birmingham	Alexander Stadium	
—	2002	12–14 July	Birmingham	Alexander Stadium	Steeplechase introduced
—	2003	25–27 July	Birmingham	Alexander Stadium	
—	2004	10–11 July	Manchester	Sportcity	Olympic trials
—	2005	9–10 July	Manchester	Sportcity	
—	2006	15–16 July	Manchester	Sportcity	

== Most successful athletes by event ==
Event	Women	Women's titles
100 metres	Joice Maduaka	5
200 metres	Kathy Smallwood-Cook	6
400 metres	Joslyn Hoyte-Smith Linda Keough	3
800 metres	Kelly Holmes	7
1500 metres	Hayley Tullett	4
3000 metres	Yvonne Murray	4
5000 metres	Hayley Yelling	3
10,000 metres	Hayley Yelling	3
3000 m steeplechase	Tina Brown	2
100 m hurdles	Sally Gunnell	7
200 m hurdles	Pat Nutting Pat Jones	3
400 m hurdles	Gowry Retchakan	5
High jump	Dorothy Tyler	8
Pole vault	Janine Whitlock	6
Long jump	Ethel Raby	6
Triple jump	Michelle Griffith	5
Shot put	Judy Oakes	17
Discus throw	Suzanne Allday	7
Hammer throw	Lorraine Shaw	6
Javelin throw	Tessa Sanderson	10
Combined events	Mary Peters	8
3000/5000 m race walk	Betty Sworowski	4
10,000 m race walk	Irene Bateman Helen Elleker Betty Sworowski Vicky Lupton	3
