= 1874 AAC Championships =

Outdoor track and field competition

- Dates: 30 March 1874
- Host city: London, England
- Venue: Lillie Bridge Grounds, London
- Level: Senior
- Type: Outdoor

The 1874 AAC Championships was an outdoor track and field competition organised by the Amateur Athletic Club (AAC). The championships were held on 30 March 1874, at the Lillie Bridge Grounds in London.

== Summary ==
- Marshall Brooks set a world record of 1.803 in the high jump.
- Edwin Woodburn equalled the world record of 3.23 in the pole jump.

== Results ==
Event	1st			2nd			3rd		
100 yards	E. Jenner Davies	Trinity C	10.5	John Potter	London AC	1 ft	Alfred H. Pearson	Notts City F.C.	inches
quarter-mile	George A. Templer	Trinity C	53¾	John Potter	London AC	4 yd	George W. Gower	G.W.R CC	6 yd
half-mile	Edward A. Sandford	Christ Church C	2:04.0	F. W. Todd (Ireland)	Irish Champion AC	3 yd	Joseph W. Moore	Birmingham AC	1 yd
1 mile	Walter Slade	AAC	4:43.0	E. B. Grimmer	Norwich AC	dnf	only 1 finished		
4 miles	Walter Slade	AAC	20:52.0	James E. Warburton	Haslingden AC	30 yd	Augustus E. Micklefield	St John's C	450 yd
120yd hurdles	Hugh K. Upcher	St John's C	16.5	John H. A. Reay	London AC	3 yd	Henry W. Beauchamp	Corpus Christi C	1 yd
7 miles walk	William J. Morgan	Atalanta RC	55:26.8	A. Gilmour	Trinity Hall	withdrew	only 1 competitor		
high jump	Marshall Brooks	Brasenose	1.803 WR	Thomas Davin (Ireland)	Irish Champion AC	1.778	J. T. Yellowly Watson	London AC	1.702
pole jump	Edwin Woodburn	Ulverston CC	3.23 =WR	Hugh M. Fyffe; Robert W. Sabin; William Kelsey	South London Harriers; Culworth AC; Hull CC	3.15; 3.15; 3.15	n/a		
long jump	E. Jenner Davies	Trinity C	6.83	Hugh K. Upcher	St John's C	6.10+	William Kelsey	Hull CC	
shot put	William F. Powell Moore	AAC	12.17	Tom Stone	Liverpool	11.96	Nicholas J. Littleton	St John's C	11.62
hammer throw	Stephen S. Brown	St John's C	36.58	William A. Burgess	Oxford U.A.C	36.47	James Paterson	Trinity C	35.61
