= 1876 AAC Championships =

Outdoor track and field competition

- Dates: 10 April 1876
- Host city: London, England
- Venue: Lillie Bridge Grounds, London
- Level: Senior
- Type: Outdoor

The 1876 AAC Championships was an outdoor track and field competition organised by the Amateur Athletic Club (AAC). The championships were held on 10 April 1876, at the Lillie Bridge Grounds in London.

== Results ==
| Event | 1st | | | 2nd | | | 3rd | | |
|---|---|---|---|---|---|---|---|---|---|
| 100 yards | Montague Shearman | Oxford UAC | 10.6 | Edward M. Salmon | Cambridge UAC | ¾ yd | E. Jenner Davies | late Cambridge UAC | |
| quarter-mile | Frederick T. Elborough | London AC | 52.4 | Alfred R. Lewis | Cambridge UAC | 4 yd | only 2 competitors | | |
| half-mile | Frederick T. Elborough | London AC | 2:03.0 | Hon. Arthur L. Pelham | Cirencester Agricultural College | 1 yd | Henry Bryden | London AC | 2 yd |
| 1 mile | Walter Slade | London AC | 4:35.2 | Harold Lee-Evans | late Cambridge UAC | 27 yd | only 2 competitors | | |
| 4 miles | Alfred Goodwin | Oxford UAC | 21:17.2 | Charles H. Mason | London AC | 3 yd | Julius C. Bendixen | South London Harriers | 120 yd |
| 120yd hurdles | Alfred B. Loder | Cambridge UAC | 16.4 | John H. A. Reay | London AC | 3 yd | Francis J. W. Wood | late Harrow School | 3-4 yd |
| 7 miles walk | Harry Venn | London AC | 55:11.8 | William J. Morgan | Atalanta RC | dnf | only 1 finished | | |
| high jump | Marshall Brooks | Oxford UAC | 1.829 | | | | only 1 competitor | | |
| pole jump | Horace W. Strachan | London AC | 3.07 | Charles W. Gaskin | Wisbech CC | 2.77 | only 2 competitors | | |
| long jump | John G. Alkin | Nuneaton AC | 6.48 | William E. Tomkin | late Eton | 6.40 | Francis J. W. Wood | late Harrow School | 6.16 |
| shot put | Tom Stone Jr. | Newton-le-Willows CC | 11.77 | William Y. Winthrop | London AC | 10.64 | only 2 competitors | | |
| hammer throw | George H. Hales | Cambridge UAC | 29.34 NR | Tom Stone Jr. | Newton-le-Willows CC | 26.11 | only 2 competitors | | |
