= 1877 AAC Championships =

Outdoor track and field competition

- Dates: 26 March 1877
- Host city: London, England
- Venue: Lillie Bridge Grounds, London
- Level: Senior
- Type: Outdoor

The 1877 AAC Championships was an outdoor track and field competition organised by the Amateur Athletic Club (AAC). The championships were held on 26 March 1877, at the Lillie Bridge Grounds in London.

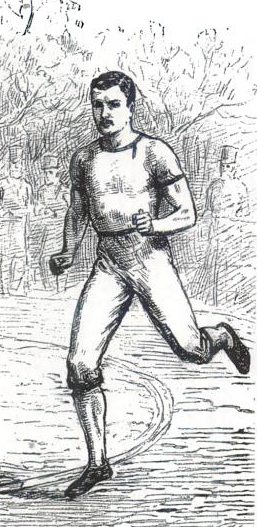
Walter Slade in 1877

== Summary ==
- Walter Slade won his fifth consecutive 1 mile title.

== Results ==
Event	1st			2nd			3rd		
100 yards	Henry MacDougall	London AC	10.4	Edward M. Salmon	Cambridge UAC	1 ft	Ernest C. Trepplin	Oxford UAC	1 yd
quarter-mile	Frederick Elborough	London AC	51.4	William H. Churchill	Cambridge UAC	5 yd	Henry W. Hill	London AC	4 yd
half-mile	Frederick Elborough	London AC	2:00.0	Arthur Pelham	AAC	3 yd	only 2 competitors		
1 mile	Walter Slade	London AC	4:29.2	W. O Moore		dnf	only 2 competitors		
4 miles	James Gibb	South London Harriers	walk over				only 1 competitor		
120yd hurdles	John H. A. Reay	London AC	17.2	Sydney F. Jackson	Oxford UAC	3 yd	Henry MacDougall	London AC	
7 miles walk	Harry Webster	Knotty Ash, Liverpool	53:59.6	William J. Morgan	Atalanta Rowing Club	53:59.8	S. W. Metcalfe	London AC	55:06.0
high jump	Gerard W. Blathwayt	Cambridge UAC	1.676	Henry E. Kayll; Horace W. Strachan; John Alkin	Sunderland FC; London AC; Nuneaton AC	1.607; 1.607; 1.607	n/a		
pole jump	Henry E. Kayll	Sunderland FC	3.28	Horace W. Strachan	London AC	3.20	only 2 competitors		
long jump	John G. Alkin	Nuneaton AC	6.27	Horace W. Strachan	London AC	5.99	only 2 competitors		
shot put	Tom Stone Jr.	Newton-le-Willows CC	11.63	William J. Winthrop	AAC	11.02	only 2 competitors		
hammer throw	George H. Hales	Cambridge UAC	33.54 NR				only 1 competitor		
