= 1875 AAC Championships =

Outdoor track and field competition

- Dates: 22 March 1875
- Host city: London, England
- Venue: Lillie Bridge Grounds, London
- Level: Senior
- Type: Outdoor

The 1875 AAC Championships was an outdoor track and field competition organised by the Amateur Athletic Club (AAC). The championships were held on 22 March 1875, at the Lillie Bridge Grounds in London.

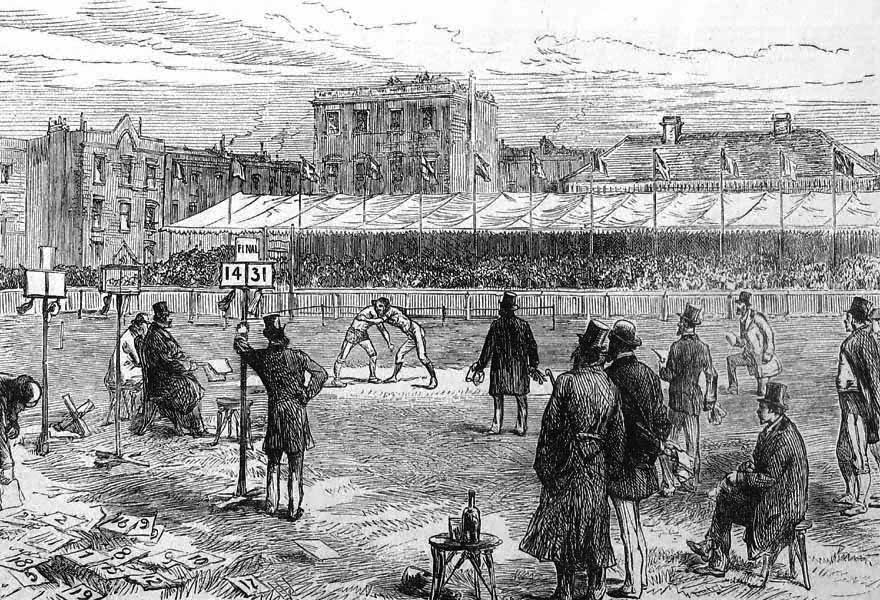
The Lillie Bridge Grounds in 1875

== Summary ==
- Michael Glazebrook equalled the world record of 1.803 in the high jump.

== Results ==
Event	1st			2nd			3rd		
100 yards	John Potter	Manchester	10.6	H. Lucas	Reading AC	6 ins - ½ yd	William C. Bedford	Clare C, Camb	6 inches
quarter-mile	Frederick T. Elborough	London AC	51.0	Alfred R. Lewis	Cambridge UAC	5 yd	John Potter	Manchester	1 ft
half-mile	Edward A. Sandford	Christ Church C	2:04.2	Henry Bryden	Clapham Rovers F.C.	1 yd	F. W. Todd	Irish Champion AC	3 yd
1 mile	Walter Slade	Albert AAC	4:35.4	T. R. Hewitt	Cambridge UAC	walked in	William Y. Winthrop	Cambridge UAC	dnf
4 miles	James Gibb	South London Harriers	21:09.4	Walter Slade	Albert AAC	dns (lap 9)	only 1 finished		
120yd hurdles	Hugh K. Upcher	St John's C	16.8	Alfred B. Loder	Cambridge UAC	1 ft	Charles A. Bayly	Lincoln C, Oxford	1 yd
7 miles walk	William J. Morgan	Atalanta RC	53:47.0 NR	H. Webster	Victoria AC, Stoke-on-Trent	dnf (lap 17)	J. H. Becke	University C, Oxford	dnf (lap 2)
high jump	Michael Glazebrook	Balliol C	1.803 =WR				only 1 competitor		
long jump	Charles L. Lockton	Merchant Taylors' School	6.36	Hugh K. Upcher	St John's C	6.21	only 2 competitors		
shot put	Tom Stone	Liverpool	12.14	William Y. Winthrop	Cambridge UAC	nm	only 2 competitors		
hammer throw	William A. Burgess	Oxford UAC	31.62	John D. Todd	Oxford UAC	30.94	Stephen S. Brown	St John's C	29.87
