= 1870 AAC Championships =

Outdoor track and field competition

- Dates: 9 April 1870
- Host city: London, England
- Venue: Lillie Bridge Grounds, London
- Level: Senior
- Type: Outdoor

The 1870 AAC Championships was an outdoor track and field competition organised by the Amateur Athletic Club (AAC). The championships were held on 9 April 1870, at the Lillie Bridge Grounds in London.

== Summary ==
- Robert Mitchell equalled the high jump record with a jump of 1.753.
- Robert Mitchell won a record four titles at one championships.

== Results ==
Event	1st			2nd			3rd		
100 yards	Alfred Baker	London AC	10.2	Francis O. Philpott	St Edmund Hall	1 ft	Edward J. Colbeck	AAC	½ yd
quarter-mile	Abbott R. Upcher	First Trinity	52.6	Edward J. Colbeck	AAC	53.2	A. G. Clarke	South Essex AC	
half-mile	Robert V. Somers-Smith	Merton C	2:02.6	Arthur J. C. Dowding	New C	2 yd	Hon. Arthur L. Pelham	Third Trinity	12 yd
1 mile	Robert H. Benson	Balliol C	4:54.6	Ellis Ashmead Bartlett	Christ Church C	4:57.6	Thomas R. Hewitt	Trinity Hall	5:02.0
4 miles	Henry C. Riches	London AC	21:24.0	Edward Hawtrey	St John's C	21:25.6	A. Hardy	London AC	500 yd
120yd hurdles	John L. Stirling	First Trinity	17.0	Francis O. Philpott	St Edmund Hall	5 yd	Ernest E. Toller	London AC	4 yd
7 miles walk	Thomas Griffith	South Essex Club	55:30 NR	R.H. Nunn	London AC	55:55	J.E. Bentley	London AC	57:01
high jump	Robert J. C. Mitchell	Manchester AC	1.753 =WR	Edward Bergman; John Harwood	St Edmund Hall; London AC	1.651	n/a		
pole jump	Robert J. C. Mitchell	Manchester AC	3.12	Edward Bergman	St Edmund Hall	3.10	Robert Graham	London RC	2.74
broad jump	Robert J. C. Mitchell	Manchester AC	6.09	Edmund Loder	Trinity C	5.84	Edward Havers	Ingatestone	5.82
shot put	Robert J. C. Mitchell	Manchester AC	11.58 NR	Edmund Phelps	Sidney Sussex C	9.88	unknown		
hammer throw	Henry Leeke	Trinity C	31.09	Francis U. Waite	Balliol C	31.06	William A. Burgess	Queen's C	30.58
