= 1878 AAC Championships =

Outdoor track and field competition

- Dates: 15 April 1878
- Host city: London, England
- Venue: Lillie Bridge Grounds, London
- Level: Senior
- Type: Outdoor

The 1878 AAC Championships was an outdoor track and field competition organised by the Amateur Athletic Club (AAC). The championships were held on 15 April 1878, at the Lillie Bridge Grounds in London.

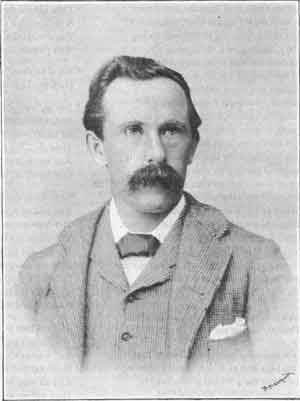
The mile champion, Arnold Hills

== Summary ==
- The attendance was between 5 and 6,000.
- Samuel Palmer set a world record of 16.0 in the 120 yards hurdles event.

== Results ==
| Event | 1st | | | 2nd | | | 3rd | | |
|---|---|---|---|---|---|---|---|---|---|
| 100 yards | Louis Junker | London AC | 10.2 | Gerald L. Spencer | Cambridge UAC | 2½ yd | Henry MacDougall | London AC | 1 yd |
| quarter-mile | John Shearman | London AC | 52.8 | Montague Shearman | Oxford UAC | 1 yd | William H. Churchill | Cambridge UAC | 6 yd |
| half-mile | Henry A. Whately; Lees Knowles | Oxford UAC; Cambridge UAC | 2:03.4; 2:03.4 | n/a | | | John D. Sadler | London AC | 4 yd |
| 1 mile | Arnold Hills | Oxford UAC | 4:28.8 | James Gibb | London AC | 2½ yd | Harold Lee-Evans | Cambridge UAC | 60 yd |
| 4 miles | James Gibb | London AC | 20:29.8 | A. P. Smith | London AC | dnf | only 2 competed | | |
| 120yd hurdles | Samuel Palmer | Cambridge UAC | 16.0 WR | Sydney F. Jackson; Charles L. Lockton | Oxford UAC; London AC | 3 yd 3 yd | n/a | | |
| 7 miles walk | Harry Venn | London AC | 52:25.0 | H. Webster | Liverpool | dnf (4.5 miles) | G. A Jones | West London Harriers | dnf (lap 5) |
| high jump | Thomas Tomlinson | Northumberland | 1.784 | Gerard Blathwayt | Cambridge UAC | 1.753 | G Sowerby (Ireland) | Louth AC | |
| pole jump | Horace W. Strachan | London AC | 3.05 | | | | only 1 competitor | | |
| long jump | Edmund Baddeley | Cambridge UAC | 6.91 | Gerard Fowler | Birmingham AC | 6.76 | | | |
| shot put | William Y. Winthrop | London AC | 11.84 | | | | only 1 competitor | | |
| hammer throw | Edmund Baddeley | Cambridge UAC | 30.12 NR | William A. Burgess | Oxford UAC | 27.00 | only 2 competitors | | |
