= 1872 AAC Championships =

Outdoor track and field competition

- Dates: 27 March 1872
- Host city: London, England
- Venue: Lillie Bridge Grounds, London
- Level: Senior
- Type: Outdoor

The 1872 AAC Championships was an outdoor track and field competition organised by the Amateur Athletic Club (AAC). The championships were held on 27 March 1872, at the Lillie Bridge Grounds in London.

== Summary ==
- Thomas Christie and George Templer tied and both set a new world record in the half-mile, recording 2.01.0.

== Results ==
Event	1st			2nd			3rd		
100 yards	William A. Dawson	First Trinity	10.5	Robert Philpot	Third Trinity	2½ yd	George E. R. Johnstone	Civil Service AA	1½ yd
quarter-mile	Robert Philpot	Third Trinity	52.8	Arthur W. Brodie	Sidney Sussex C	1½ yd	Edmund Loder	Trinity C	4 yd
half-mile	Thomas Christie; George Templer	Lincoln C Trinity C	2:01.0 WR	n/a			Hon. Arthur L. Pelham	Third Trinity	8yd
1 mile	Charles H. Mason	London AC	4:42.25	Thomas R. Hewitt	Trinity Hall	8 yd	Edward Hawtrey	St John's C	8 yd
4 miles	James B. Edgar	Isle of Man	21:31.25	Alfred Wheeler	German Gymnastic Society	21:44.0	J. Powell	Barnes Football Club	22:22.0
120yd hurdles	John L. Stirling	London AC	16.8	Edward Garnier	University C	½ yd	Henry W. Beauchamp	Corpus Christi C	2 yd
7 miles walk	T. R. Hogg	Lewisham CC	57:22	H. W. Steib	Preston GC	5 yd	J. A. Jobling	Northumberland CC	600 yd
high jump	Edward S. Prior	Caius C	1.626	Francis H. Woods	Jesus C	1.600	James F. Bland (Ireland)	University of Dublin	
pole jump	Henry Fellowes	Lichfield College	2.90	William F. Powell Moore	AAC	2.84	only 2 competitors		
long jump	E. Jenner Davies	Pembroke C	6.88 NR	Ralph L. Dixon	Catherine Hall	6.17	William A. Dawson	First Trinity	5.79
shot put	Edward J. Bor (Ireland)	Royal Engineers	12.93 NR	William F. Powell Moore	AAC	10.74	Henry W. R. Domville	Pembroke C	10.67
hammer throw	Henry Leeke	Stafford	34.01 NR	James Paterson	Trinity C	33.86	William A. Burgess	Derby School	32.08
