= 1869 AAC Championships =

Outdoor track and field competition

- Dates: 3 April 1869
- Host city: London, England
- Venue: Lillie Bridge Grounds, London
- Level: Senior
- Type: Outdoor

The 1869 AAC Championships was an outdoor track and field competition organised by the Amateur Athletic Club (AAC). The championships were held on 3 April 1869, at the Lillie Bridge Grounds for the first time, which were the new headquarters of the AAC.

== Summary ==
- Heavy rain affected the field events.

== Results ==
Event	1st			2nd			3rd		
100 yards	John G. Wilson	Worcester C	10.4	Edmund Loder	Eton College	1 yd	John H. Hague	Enfield Lock	level
quarter-mile	Edward J. Colbeck	AAC	53.6	W. G. Grace	Downend	10 yd	Frederick Thornton Down	Pembroke C	5 yd
half-mile	Robert V. Somers-Smith	Merton C	2:02.6	Edward J. Colbeck	AAC	2 yd	William B. Newson	German Gymnastic Society	12 yd
1 mile	Walter M. Chinnery	London AC	4:50.0	George A. Templer	Harrow	5:01.5	only 2 competitors		
4 miles	Walter M. Chinnery	London AC	21:30.0	Edward Hawtrey	London AC	21:35.0	W. Gilmour	London AC	
120yd hurdles	George R. Nunn	Guy's Hospital	18.6	Ernest E. Toller	Trinity College	4 yd	Walter F. Eaton	AAC	6 inches
7 miles walk	Thomas Griffith	South Essex Club	58:35	C. E. Broad	Middlesex AC	64:02	Walter Rye	London AC	did not start
high jump	John Gurney Hoare	Trinity College	1.575	John A. Harwood	London AC	1.524	only 2 competitors		
pole jump	Robert G. Graham	Barnes Football Club	2.82	n/a			only 1 competitor		
broad jump	Alick C. Tosswill	Oriel C	5.97	John H. Hague	Enfield Lock	5.28	only 2 competitors		
shot put	Henry Leeke	Trinity College	9.56	A. MacFie	Birmingham AC	9.19	only 2 competitors		
hammer throw	William A. Burgess	Queen's C	31.17	Henry Leeke	Trinity College	30.28	Francis U. Waite	Balliol C	29.41
