= 1873 AAC Championships =

Outdoor track and field competition

- Dates: 5 April 1873
- Host city: London, England
- Venue: Lillie Bridge Grounds, London
- Level: Senior
- Type: Outdoor

The 1873 AAC Championships was an outdoor track and field competition organised by the Amateur Athletic Club (AAC). The championships were held on 5 April 1873, at the Lillie Bridge Grounds in London.

== Summary ==
- Several events were affected by absentees.

== Results ==
Event	1st			2nd			3rd		
100 yards	John Potter	S.L.H	10.4	Alfred W. Oldfield	Birmingham AC	½ yd	George E. R. Johnstone	AAC	4 ft
quarter-mile	Abbott R. Upcher	First Trinity	53.4	Charles D. Risbee	Northampton	8-10 yd	J. G. MacLean	Carlton FC	5 yd
half-mile	Hon. Arthur L. Pelham	Third Trinity	2:05.5	George A. Templer	Trinity	3 yd	Joseph W. Moore	Birmingham AC	1½ yd
1 mile	Walter Slade	AAC	4:32.6	Edward A. Sandford	Christ Church C	3 yd	Joseph W. Moore	Birmingham AC	30 yd
4 miles	Arthur F. Somerville	Trinity Hall	21:38.0	Alfred Wheeler	Stoke-upon-Trent	21:48.0			
120yd hurdles	Hugh K. Upcher	St John's C	16.4	Edward S. Garnier; John H. A. Reay	University C AAC	½ yd ½ yd	n/a		
7 miles walk	William J. Morgan	Atalanta RC	54:56 NR				only 1 finished		
high jump	John B. Hurst (Ireland)	Louth	1.676	Edward S. Prior; Francis H. Woods; John Harwood	Caius C Jesus C London AC	1.626; 1.626; 1.626	n/a		
pole jump	William Kelsey	Hull	3.20	Charles Leeds	AAC	3.10	A. F Deck; T. B. Wholley	Bartholomew's; Gipsies FC	
long jump	Charles Lockton	Thames H & H	5.89				only 1 competitor		
shot put	Edward J. Bor (Ireland)	Royal Engineers	12.19	Tom Stone	Newton-le-Willows	11.76	William F. Powell Moore	AAC	11.20
hammer throw	James Paterson	Trinity C	32.92				only 1 competitor		
