= 1890 AAA Championships =

Outdoor track and field competition

- Dates: 12 July 1890
- Host city: Birmingham, England
- Venue: Aston Lower Grounds
- Level: Senior
- Type: Outdoor
- Events: 14

The 1890 AAA Championships was an outdoor track and field competition organised by the Amateur Athletic Association (AAA), held on Saturday 12 July 1890 at the Aston Lower Grounds in Birmingham, England in front of 3,000 spectators.

The 14 events were the same number and disciplines as in the previous year.

== Results ==
Event	Gold		Silver		Bronze	
100 yards	(Leinster) Norman Morgan	10.4	Ernest E. Parlby	1 ft	H. Beswick	1 ft
440 yards	(Wales) Thomas Nicholas	51.8	Thomas Pitman	1½ yd	W Lock	½ yd
880 yards	Thomas Pitman	1.58.4	Harry Whittick	4 yd	Walter Uriah Churley	7 yd
1 mile	James Kibblewhite	4.23.2	William Fowler	6 yd	Charles Hookins	20 yd
4 miles	James Kibblewhite	20.16.4	Charles Hookins	20.26.0	J.R. Hainsworth	20.37.4
10 miles	James Kibblewhite	53.49.0	Tom Birch	54.23.0	H. Bamford	56.28.0
steeplechase	Edward Parry	10.54.6	Colin Souch	200 yd	only 2 finished	
120yd hurdles	Charles Daft	16.8	Cecil Haward	2 yd	Tom Baylis	5 yd
7 miles walk	Harry Curtis	52.28.4	William Wheeler	54.29.2	John Wells	54.58.6
high jump	Cecil Haward	1.740	Thomas Jennings	1.676	Arthur Watkinson	1.600
pole jump	Robert Dickinson	3.35	Tom Ray	3.20	J.A.T. Hall & Robert Watson	3.05
long jump	(Scotland) Robert G. Hogarth	6.09	(Leinster) Daniel Bulger	6.04	Arthur Badger	5.97
shot put	R.A. Greene	11.48	W.E. West	10.41	only 2 competed	
hammer throw	Robert Lindsay	31.50	(Scotland) G. Chisholm	29.82	J.E. Fraser	nm
