= Clement Jackson =

British athlete and academic

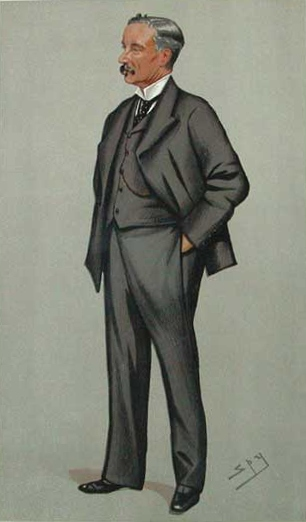
- "Jacky"; As depicted by "Spy" (Leslie Ward) in Vanity Fair, 3 September 1892

Personal information
- Born: 2 April 1846 Simla, India
- Died: 1924 (aged 77–78)

Sport
- Sport: Athletics
- Event: Hurdles
- Club: Oxford University Athletic Club

Clement Nugent Jackson (2 April 1846 – 1924) was a British athlete, academic and athletics administrator.

== Early life ==
He was born in Simla, India, the second son of Lt-Gen George Jackson of the Bengal Staff Corps, and Phillis Sophia Strode. He was educated at Magdalen Hall, Oxford (later to be Hertford College).

== Athlete ==
Jackson was a gifted hurdler, winning the high hurdles at the fourth Varsity Sports of 1867, with a time of 17.8s. He subsequently competed in the 120 yards hurdles event at the 1867 AAC Championships. He later improved this to 16.0s, a British record (that stood for many years) and probably a World record, although at that time there was no international body to such records.

He had to retire from competition after badly cutting his foot on an oyster shell while running against W G Grace.

== Academic career ==
In 1869, he was elected as a don at Hertford College. He was known as "The Jacker". In the first Oxford Telephone Directory of 1895, he was one of only 96 subscribers. By this time he was Bursar of Hertford, and would later be Senior Proctor for the University.

== Athletics administrator ==
In 1868, he was appointed Club Auditor of the Oxford University Athletic Club (OUAC), and in 1869, Senior Treasurer, a position he held for some sixty years. He guided the club towards a position of international prominence and Jackson became renowned as an authority figure within athletics.

He also acted as mentor and coach to the club's members. As a trusted official, Jackson was called upon to determine who had won in a close finish at the Varsity Sports.

Together with two other Oxford men, Montague Shearman and Bernhard Wise, he was the guiding force in the founding of the Amateur Athletic Association on 24 April 1880. The first AAA Championships were held on 3 July 1880 at the Lillie Bridge Grounds.

== Personal life ==
He married Ada Louisa Martin. His brother, Morton Strode Jackson married her sister, Edith Rosine Martin. Morton's son Arnold Jackson won the gold medal in the 1500m at the 1912 Olympic Games in Stockholm, coached by his uncle, Clement Jackson.

== Legacy ==
In 1926, Sir Montague Shearman and other members of the Achilles Club presented a Trophy in memory of Jackson, to be awarded annually to the winning team in the Oxford vs Cambridge Varsity Sports. In recent years it has been noted that the trophy was inscribed as the "ARNOLD Jackson Memorial Trophy". Apparently, during the 1970s the original had been stolen, and a mistake was made when ordering the replacement. A further inscription, correcting the error, has been added to the trophy.

The CN Jackson Memorial Cup is awarded annually by the AAA to the English male athlete who is adjudged to be the outstanding athlete of that year.
