= List of British champions in 400 metres =

The British 400 metres athletics champions covers four competitions; the current British Athletics Championships which was founded in 2007, the preceding AAA Championships (1880-2006), the Amateur Athletic Club Championships (1866-1879) and finally the UK Athletics Championships which existed from 1977 until 1997 and ran concurrently with the AAA Championships.

The AAA Championships were open to international athletes but were not considered the National Champion in this list if they won the relevant Championship. Between 1977 and 1994, and again in 1997, two events effectively crowned national champions each year. The official UK Athletics Championships (not to be confused with the current championships, a rebranded British Athletics Championships) were specifically only open to British nationals and were organised by the national governing body. The AAA Championships continued, and due to their history, continued to be considered by both statisticians and athletes to be the more prestigious championships, with the exception of 1997 where the UK Championships were considered the principle championships for the only time. Winners at the UK Championships were nonetheless considered as having won a national title.

The UK Athletics Championships ceased to exist upon the insolvency of the governing body, the British Athletics Federation. The AAA championships continued until 2006, before they were replaced by the new British Athletics Championships. David Jenkins, with nine AAA titles, including eight successive titles between 1971 and 1978 and again in 1982, and a single UK Athletics Championships gold medal in 1980, is the most successful 400 metre athlete in British domestic history. Linda Keough won eight national women's titles, five AAA and three UK championships; on three occasions she won both titles in the same year, while Joslyn Hoyte-Smith won seven titles in the two championships era, again winning both titles in three separate years; but Valerie Ball's six successive AAA wins in the immediate post-war era where only one championship was available annually means she is normally considered the most successful domestic British female athlete in the event, crowned national champion in six separate years.

== Past winners ==
AAC Championships 440 yards, mens event only
Year	Men's champion
1866	John Ridley
1867	John Ridley ^{(2)}
1868	Edward Colbeck
1869	Edward Colbeck ^{(2)}
1870	Abbott Upcher
1871	Abbott Upcher
1872	Robert Philpot
1873	Abbott Upcher ^{(3)}
1874	George Templer
1875	Frederick Elborough
1876	Frederick Elborough
1877	Frederick Elborough ^{(3)}
1878	John Shearman
1879	Edgar Storey / Henry Ball

AAA Championships 440 yards, men's event only
Year	Men's champion
1880	Montague Shearman
1881	William Phillips
1882	Henry Ball ^{(2)}
1883	James Cowie
1884	James Cowie
1885	James Cowie ^{(3)}
1886	Charles Wood
1887	Charles Wood ^{(2)}
1888	Henry Tindall
1889	Henry Tindall ^{(2)}
1890	Thomas Nicholas
1891	J.P. Shuter
1892	David Basan
1893	Edgar Bredin
1894	Edgar Bredin ^{(2)}
1895	William Fitzherbert
1896	William Fitzherbert
1897	Samuel Elliott
1898	William Fitzherbert ^{(3)}
1899	Reginald Wadsley
1900	William Welsh
1901	Reginald Wadsley ^{(2)}
1902	George White
1903	Charles McLachlan
1904	Robert Watson
1905	Wyndham Halswelle
1906	Wyndham Halswelle
1907	Edwin Montague
1908	Wyndham Halswelle ^{(3)}
1909	Alan Patterson
1910	Lionel Reed
1911	William Tettenhall
1912	Cyril Seedhouse
1913	George Nicol
1914	Cyril Seedhouse ^{(2)}
1919	Guy Butler
1920	Guy Butler
1921	Robert Lindsay

AAA Championships & WAAA Championships
Year	Men's champion	Year	Women's champion
440 yards
1922	Harry Edward	1922	Mary Lines
1923	Guy Butler ^{(3)}	1923	Mary Lines ^{(2)}
1924	Eric Liddell	1924	Vera Palmer
1925	Henry Stallard	1925	Vera Palmer
1926	John Rinkel	1926	Vera Palmer ^{(3)}
1927	Douglas Lowe	1927	Dorothy Proctor
1928	Douglas Lowe ^{(2)}	1928	Florence Haynes
1929	John Hanlon	1929	Marion King
1930	Kenneth Brangwin	1930	Elsie Wright
1931	Godfrey Rampling	1931	Nellie Halstead
1932	Crew Stoneley	1932	Nellie Halstead
1933	Freddie Wolff	1933	Nellie Halstead
1934	Godfrey Rampling ^{(2)}	1934	Violet Branch
1935	Bill Roberts	1935	Olive Hall
1936	Godfrey Brown	1936	Olive Hall
1937	Bill Roberts	1937	Nellie Halstead ^{(4)}
1938	Godfrey Brown ^{(2)}	1938	Olive Hall
1939	Alan Pennington	1939	Olive Hall ^{(4)}
1945	nc	1945	Winifred Jordan
1946	Bill Roberts	1946	Margaret Walker
1947	John Mark	1947	Joan Upton
1948	Bill Roberts ^{(4)}	1948	Valerie Ball
1949	Derek Pugh	1949	Valerie Ball
1950	Leslie Lewis	1950	Valerie Ball
1951	Derek Pugh ^{(2)}	1951	Valerie Ball
1952	Leslie Lewis ^{(2)}	1952	Valerie Ball
1953	Peter Fryer	1953	Valerie Ball ^{(6)}
1954	Peter Fryer	1954	Gloria Goldsborough
1955	Peter Fryer ^{(3)}	1955	Janet Ruff
1956	Mike Wheeler	1956	Janet Ruff
1957	Peter Higgins	1957	Janet Ruff ^{(3)}
1958	John Salisbury	1958	Shirley Pirie
1959	John Wrighton	1959	Margaret Pickerill
1960	Robbie Brightwell	1960	Pam Piercy
1961	Adrian Metcalfe	1961	Maeve Kyle
1962	Robbie Brightwell	1962	Jean Sorrell
1963	Adrian Metcalfe ^{(2)}	1963	Joy Grieveson
1964	Robbie Brightwell ^{(3)}	1964	Ann Packer
1965	John Adey	1965	Joy Grieveson
1966	Tim Graham	1966	Joy Grieveson ^{(3)}
1967	Tim Graham ^{(2)}	1967	Lillian Board
1968	Martin Winbolt-Lewis	1968	Janet Simpson
400 metres - metrification
1969	Gwynne Griffiths	1969	Jenny Pawsey
1970	Martin Bilham	1970	Marilyn Neufville
1971	David Jenkins	1971	Jannette Roscoe
1972	David Jenkins	1972	Verona Bernard
1973	David Jenkins	1973	Jannette Roscoe ^{(2)}
1974	David Jenkins	1974	Donna Murray
1975	David Jenkins	1975	Donna Murray ^{(2)}
1976	David Jenkins	1976	Verona Elder (née Bernard)

AAA Championships/WAAA Championships & UK Athletics Championships dual championships era 1977-1987
Year	AAA Men	Year	WAAA Women	Year	UK Men	UK Women
1977	David Jenkins	1977	Verona Elder ^{(3)}	1977	Walcott Taylor	Donna Hartley (née Murray)
1978	David Jenkins	1978	Josyln Hoyte	1978	Richard Ashton	Jane Colebrook
1979	Sebastian Coe	1979	Joslyn Hoyte-Smith	1979	Steve Scutt	Joslyn Hoyte-Smith
1980	Rod Milne	1980	Michelle Probert	1980	David Jenkins	Linsey MacDonald
1981	Garry Cook	1981	Joslyn Hoyte-Smith	1981	Steve Scutt ^{(2)}	Joslyn Hoyte-Smith
1982	David Jenkins ^{(9)}	1982	Michelle Scutt	1982	Phil Brown	Michelle Scutt
1983	Ainsley Bennett	1983	Joslyn Hoyte-Smith ^{(4)}	1983	Alan Slack	Joslyn Hoyte-Smith ^{(3)}
1984	Alan Slack	1984	Tracy Lawton	1984	Kriss Akabusi	Jane Parry
1985	Derek Redmond	1985	Linda Keough	1985	Phil Brown	Linda Keough
1986	Roger Black	1986	Kathy Cook	1986	Phil Brown ^{(3)}	Angela Piggford
1987	Derek Redmond	1987	Linda Keough	1987	Steve Heard	Carol Finlay

AAA Championships & UK Athletics Championships dual championships era 1988-1997
Year	Men AAA	Women AAA	Year	Men UK	Women UK
1988	Kriss Akabusi	Linda Keough	1988	Brian Whittle	Linda Keough
1989	Phil Brown	Linda Keough	1989	Paul Sanders	Linda Keough ^{(3)}
1990	Lewis Samuel	Linda Keough ^{(5)}	1990	Roger Black	Diane Edwards
1991	Derek Redmond	Lorraine Hanson	1991	Paul Sanders ^{(2)}	Sandra Leigh
1992	Derek Redmond ^{(4)}	Phylis Smith	1992	Roger Black ^{(2)}	Sandra Douglas (née Leigh) ^{(2)}
1993	Ade Mafe	Phylis Smith	1993	Du'aine Ladejo	Phylis Smith
1994	Roger Black	Melanie Neef	n/a		
1995	Mark Richardson	Melanie Neef ^{(2)}	n/a		
1996	Roger Black ^{(3)}	Phylis Smith ^{(3)}	n/a		
1997	Kent Ulyatt	Lorraine Hanson	1997	Iwan Thomas	Donna Fraser

AAA Championships second era 1998-2006
Year	Men's champion	Women's champion
1998	Iwan Thomas	Allison Curbishley
1999	Jamie Baulch	Katharine Merry
2000	Mark Richardson	Donna Fraser
2001	Mark Richardson ^{(3)}	Lesley Owusu
2002	Tim Benjamin	Lee McConnell
2003	Daniel Caines	Helen Karagounis
2004	Tim Benjamin	Christine Ohuruogu
2005	Tim Benjamin	Donna Fraser ^{(2)}
2006	Tim Benjamin ^{(4)}	Nicola Sanders

British Athletics Championships 2007 to present
Year	Men's champion	Women's champion
2007	Andrew Steele	Nicola Sanders ^{(2)}
2008	Martyn Rooney	Lee McConnell
2009	Robert Tobin	Christine Ohuruogu
2010	Martyn Rooney	Lee McConnell ^{(3)}
2011	Martyn Rooney	Perri Shakes-Drayton
2012	Martyn Rooney	Christine Ohuruogu
2013	Nigel Levine	Christine Ohuruogu ^{(4)}
2014	Martyn Rooney ^{(5)}	Kelly Massey
2015	Rabah Yousif	Anyika Onuora
2016	Matthew Hudson-Smith	Emily Diamond
2017	Matthew Hudson-Smith	Zoey Clark
2018	Matthew Hudson-Smith	Anyika Onuora ^{(2)}
2019	Matthew Hudson-Smith	Laviai Nielsen
2020	Alex Knibbs	Laviai Nielsen ^{(2)}
2021	Niclas Baker	Jodie Williams
2022	Matthew Hudson-Smith	Victoria Ohuruogu
2023	Alex Haydock-Wilson	Victoria Ohuruogu ^{(2)}
2024	Charlie Dobson	Amber Anning
2025	Charlie Dobson ^{(2)}	Amber Anning
2026	Matthew Hudson-Smith ^{(6)}	Amber Anning ^{(3)}

nc = not contested

=== Most titles ===
('AAA continuity' only; athletes in bold still active)

400 metres - most titles
Titles	Men	Women
9	David Jenkins (1971-78, 1982)	
6	**Matthew Hudson-Smith** (2016-19, 2022, 2026)	Valerie Ball (1948-53)
5	Martyn Rooney (2008, 2010-12, 2014)	Linda Keough (1985, 1987-90)
4	Bill Roberts (1935, 1937, 1946, 1948); Derek Redmond (1985, 1987, 1991-92); Tim Benjamin (2002, 2004-06)	Nellie Halstead (1931-33, 1937); Olive Hall (1935-36, 1938-39); Joslyn Hoyte-Smith (1978-79, 1981, 1983); Christine Ohuruogu (2004, 2009, 2012-13)
3	10 athletes	7 athletes (1 active)
