= 1896 AAA Championships =

Outdoor track and field competition

- Dates: 4 July 1896
- Host city: Northampton, England
- Venue: County Cricket Ground, Northampton
- Level: Senior
- Type: Outdoor
- Events: 14

The 1896 AAA Championships was an outdoor track and field competition organised by the Amateur Athletic Association (AAA), held on Saturday 4 July 1896 at the County Cricket Ground, Northampton in Northampton, England, in front of 7,000 spectators.

The 14 events were the same number as in the previous year and all 14 event disciplines remained the same.

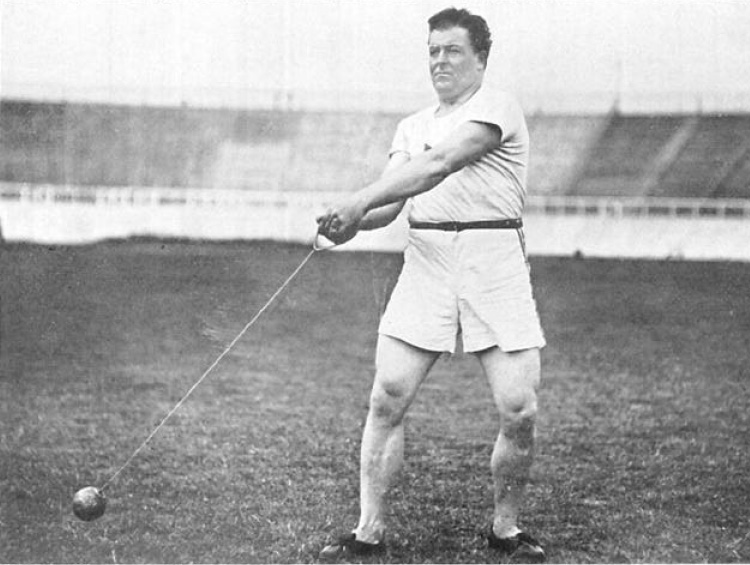
John Flanagan

== Results ==
| Event | Gold | | Silver | | Bronze | |
|---|---|---|---|---|---|---|
| 100 yards | (Leinster) Norman Morgan | 10.4 | Max Wittenberg | 1½ yd | Charles Thomas | |
| 440 yards | (Leinster) James Meredith | 52.0 | William Fitzherbert | 3 yd | H.D. Casey | 5 yd |
| 880 yards | William King | 2:01.4 | Henry Cullum | 1 ft | Alec Nelson | 8 yd |
| 1 mile | Benson Lawford | 4:31.4 | Robert Wellin | 10 yd | Montague Davie | 8 yd |
| 4 miles | Henry Harrison | 20:27.4 | Charles Pearce | 60 yd | James Collins | 50 yd |
| 10 miles | George Crossland | 52:05.0 | Harry Watkins | 52:10.0 | Percy Biss | 56:10.4 |
| steeplechase | Sidney Robinson | 11:25.0 | A.G. Dabbs | 50 yd | George Lee | 30 yd |
| 120yd hurdles | Godfrey Shaw | 15.6 | J. King | 6 yd | Frederic Allfrey | 4 yd |
| 4 miles walk | William Sturgess | 28:57.6 | Harry Curtis | 29:27.4 | M.K. Forrester | 30:02.4 |
| high jump | (Leinster) Murty O'Brien | 1.803 | Reginald Williams | 1.651 | only 2 competitors | |
| pole jump | R.E. Forshaw | 3.05 | Edwin Newby | 2.97 | only 2 competitors | |
| long jump | Claude Leggatt | 7.03 | (Leinster) R.D. Barbour | 6.92 | J. Richardson | 6.37 |
| shot put | (Leinster) Denis Horgan | 13.24 | (Leinster) John Flanagan | 12.32 | only 2 competitors | |
| hammer throw | (Leinster) John Flanagan | 13.24 | (Leinster) Denis Horgan | 12.32 | only 2 competitors | |
