= 1892 AAA Championships =

Outdoor track and field competition

- Dates: 2 July 1892
- Host city: London, England
- Venue: Stamford Bridge (stadium)
- Level: Senior
- Type: Outdoor
- Events: 14

The 1892 AAA Championships was an outdoor track and field competition organised by the Amateur Athletic Association (AAA), held on Saturday 2 July 1892 at Stamford Bridge (stadium) in London, England.

The 14 events were the same number and disciplines as in the previous year.

== Results ==
Event	Gold		Silver		Bronze	
100 yards	Charles Bradley	10.2	Hugh Bell	2 yd	(Leinster) Daniel Bulger	1 yd
440 yards	(Leinster) C.R. Dickenson	50.4	David Basan	inches	(Gibraltar) Edgar Bredin	inches
880 yards	William Holmes	2:00.0	F. Owen-Jones	3½ yd	A.R. Williams	3½ yd
1 mile	Harold Wade	4:19.2	William Fowler	4:21.6	William Lutyens	50 yd
4 miles	James Kibblewhite	19:50.6	(Scotland) Henry Munro	19:51.6	Sidney Thomas	
10 miles	Sidney Thomas	53:25.2	Herbert Heath	54:27.8	Harold Wade	54:40.6
steeplechase	W.H. Smith	11:23.8	George Martin	11:31.8	only 2 finished	
120yd hurdles	(Leinster) Daniel Bulger	16.0 =NR	Godfrey Shaw	¾ yd	(New Zealand) Harold Batger	1 yd
7 miles walk	Harry Curtis	55:56.2	David Fenton	57:06.2	A. Wooll	57:34.2
high jump	Arthur Watkinson	1.740	William Wylie; Hugh Le Fleming	1.689; 1.689	not awarded	
pole jump	Robert Watson; Robert Dickinson	3.35; 3.35	not awarded		only 2 competitors	
long jump	(Leinster) Daniel Bulger	6.51	J.S. Mackintosh	6.29	Arthur Square	6.28
shot put	(Leinster) William Barry	13.07	William Murray	11.59	(Leinster) William Kelly	11.20
hammer throw	(Leinster) William Barry	40.62 NR	(Leinster) William Kelly	30.99	R.G.H. Woods	30.25
