= List of British champions in 100 metres =

The British 100 metres athletics champions covers four competitions;

- the current British Athletics Championships which was founded in 2007,
- the preceding AAA Championships (1880-2006),
- the Amateur Athletic Club Championships (1866-1879) and finally
- the UK Athletics Championships which existed from 1977 until 1997 and ran concurrently with the AAA Championships.

The AAA Championships were open to international athletes but those athletes were not considered the National Champion in this list if they won the relevant Championship, with the highest ranking British athlete given that title.

Between 1977 and 1994, and again in 1997, two events effectively crowned national champions each year. The official UK Athletics Championships (not to be confused with the current championships, a rebranded British Athletics Championships) were specifically only open to British nationals and were organised by the national governing body. The AAA Championships continued, and due to their history, continued to be considered by both statisticians and athletes to be the more prestigious championships, with the exception of 1997 where the UK Championships were considered the principle championships for the only time. Winners at the UK Championships were nonetheless considered as having won a national title.

The UK Athletics Championships ceased to exist upon the insolvency of the governing body, the British Athletics Federation. The AAA championships continued until 2006, before they were replaced by the new British Athletics Championships.

The most successful sprinter in championships history is Linford Christie, who amassed nine in the AAA Championship continuity, in addition to six in the UK Championships. In total he won at least one version of the national title in eleven separate years. McDonald Bailey with seven titles and Dwain Chambers with eight, all in the single championship era, are the nearest challengers.

In women's sprinting, Paula Dunn accumulated five wins in the AAA Championship and three in the UK Championship - and on three occasions completed AAA/UK Championships doubles - but Joice Maduaka, with six titles in the single championships era, is considered the most successful female 100 metre sprinter in championships history.

*nc= no championship held

== Past winners ==
- ^{(#)} indicates the final victory of a multiple winner, and the number of titles they won; 1980-90s UK Athletics Championships titles are counted separately.

AAC Championships 100 yards, mens event only
Year	Men's champion
1866	Thomas Codmore
1867	John Ridley
1868	William Tennent
1869	John Wilson
1870	Alfred Baker
1871	John Wilson ^{(2)}
1872	William Dawson
1873	John Potter
1874	Jenner Davies
1875	John Potter ^{(2)}
1876	Montague Shearman
1877	Henry MacDougall
1878	Gerald Spencer
1879	Melville Portal / Charles Lockton
AAA Championships First Era 1880-1977
1880	William Phillips
1881	William Phillips
1882	William Phillips ^{(3)}
1883	James Cowie
1884	James Cowie
1885	James Cowie ^{(3)}
1886	Arthur Wharton
1887	Arthur Wharton ^{(2)}
1888	Frank Ritchie
1889	Ernest Pelling
1890	Ernest Parlby
1891	Ernest Kirkwood House
1892	Charles Bradley
1893	Charles Bradley
1894	Charles Bradley
1895	Charles Bradley ^{(4)}
1896	Max Wittenberg
1897	J H Palmer
1898	Frederick Cooper
1899	Reginald Wadsley
1900	NBA
1901	Reginald Wadsley
1902	Reginald Wadsley ^{(3)}
1903	F Rivers
1904	John Morton
1905	John Morton
1906	John Morton
1907	John Morton
1908	John Morton ^{(5)}
1909	Meyrick Chapman
1910	Willie Applegarth
1911	Victor d'Arcy
1912	Willie Applegarth
1913	Willie Applegarth
1914	Willie Applegarth ^{(4)}
1919	William Hill
1920	Harry Edward
1921	Harry Edward ^{(2)}

AAA Championships & WAAA Championships
Year	Men's champion	Year	Women's champion
100 yards
1922	Harry Edward ^{(3)}	1922	Nora Callebout
1923	Eric Liddell	1923	Mary Lines
1924	Harold Abrahams	1924	Eileen Edwards
1925	Walter Rangeley	1925	Rose Thompson
1926	Jack London	1926	Florence Haynes
1927	Harold Hodge	1927	Eileen Edwards ^{(2)}
1928	Jack London	1928	Muriel Gunn
1929	Jack London ^{(3)}	1929	Ivy Walker
1930	Stanley Engelhart	1930	Eileen Hiscock
1931	Ernest Page	1931	Nellie Halstead
1932	Fred Reid	1932	Ethel Johnson
1933	George Saunders	1933	Eileen Hiscock
1934	Arthur Sweeney	1934	Eileen Hiscock
1935	Arthur Sweeney	1935	Eileen Hiscock
1936	Arthur Sweeney	1936	Eileen Hiscock ^{(5)}
1937	Cyril Holmes	1937	Winifred Jeffrey
1938	Maurice Scarr	1938	Betty Lock
1939	Arthur Sweeney ^{(4)}	1939	Betty Lock ^{(2)}
1945	nc	1945	Winifred Jordan
1946	McDonald Bailey	1946	Maureen Gardner
1947	McDonald Bailey	1947	Winifred Jordan
1948	Alastair McCorquodale	1948	Winifred Jordan ^{(4)}
1949	McDonald Bailey	1949	Sylvia Cheeseman
1950	McDonald Bailey	1950	June Foulds
1951	McDonald Bailey	1951	June Foulds
1952	McDonald Bailey	1952	Heather Armitage
1953	McDonald Bailey ^{(7)}	1953	Anne Pashley
1954	George Ellis	1954	Anne Pashley ^{(2)}
1955	Roy Sandstrom	1955	Margaret Francis
1956	John Young	1956	June Paul (née Foulds) ^{(3)}
1957	Ken Box	1957	Heather Young ^{(2)}
1959	Ron Jones	1958	Madeleine Weston
1959	Peter Radford	1959	Dorothy Hyman
1960	Peter Radford	1960	Dorothy Hyman
1961	David Jones	1961	Jenny Smart
1962	Peter Radford ^{(3)}	1962	Dorothy Hyman
1963	Berwyn Jones	1963	Dorothy Hyman
1964	Lynn Davies	1964	Daphne Arden
1965	Barrie Kelly	1965	Jill Hall
1966	Barrie Kelly	1966	Daphne Slater ^{(2)}
1967	Barrie Kelly ^{(3)}	1967	Della James
1968	Ron Jones	1968	Val Peat
100 metres - metrification
1969	Ron Jones ^{(3)}	1969	Dorothy Hyman ^{(5)}
1970	Brian Green	1970	Anita Neil
1971	Brian Green	1971	Anita Neil ^{(2)}
1972	Brian Green ^{(3)}	1972	Della Pascoe (née James) ^{(2)}
1973	Don Halliday	1973	Andrea Lynch
1974	Don Halliday ^{(2)}	1974	Andrea Lynch
1975	Ainsley Bennett	1975	Andrea Lynch
1976	Allan Wells	1976	Andrea Lynch ^{(4)}

AAA Championships/WAAA Championships & UK Athletics Championships dual championships era 1977-1987
Year	Men AAA	Year	Women WAAA	Year	Men UK	Women UK
1977	Tim Bonsor	1977	Sonia Lannaman	1977	Ainsley Bennett	Sonia Lannaman
1978	)	1978	Kathy Smallwood	1978	Allan Wells	Sonia Lannaman ^{(2)}
1979	Mike McFarlane	1979	Heather Hunte	1979	Trevor Hoyte	Heather Hunte
1980	Allan Wells	1980	Kathy Smallwood	1980	Cameron Sharp	Heather Hunte
1981	Drew McMaster	1981	Wendy Hoyte	1981	Cameron Sharp ^{(2)}	Linsey MacDonald
1982	Cameron Sharp	1982	Wendy Hoyte ^{(2)}	1982	Earl Tulloch	Heather Oakes
1983	Allan Wells (4)	1983	Kathy Cook (n. Smallwood)	1983	Buster Watson	Kathy Cook
1984	Donovan Reid	1984	Kathy Cook ^{(4)}	1984	Mike McFarlane	Heather Oakes ^{(4)}
1985	Lincoln Asquith+	1985	Heather Oakes ^{(2)}	1985	Linford Christie	Jayne Andrews
1986	Linford Christie	1986	Paula Dunn	1986	Jamie Henderson	Paula Dunn
1987	John Regis	1987	Paula Dunn	1987	Linford Christie	Paula Dunn

AAA Championships & UK Athletics Championships dual championships era 1988-1997
Year	Men AAA	Women AAA	Year	Men UK	Women UK
1988	Linford Christie	Paula Dunn	1988	John Regis	Paula Dunn ^{(3)}
1989	Linford Christie	Paula Dunn	1989	Marcus Adam	Stephi Douglas
1990	Linford Christie	Stephi Douglas	1990	Linford Christie	Sallyanne Short
1991	Linford Christie	Stephi Douglas	1991	Linford Christie	Beverly Kinch
1992	Linford Christie	Stephi Douglas	1992	Linford Christie	Marcia Richardson
1993	Linford Christie	Beverly Kinch	1993	Linford Christie ^{(6)}	Beverly Kinch ^{(2)}
1994	Linford Christie	Katharine Merry	n/a		
1995	Darren Braithwaite	Paula Thomas (née Dunn) ^{(5)}	n/a		
1996	Linford Christie ^{(9)}	Stephi Douglas ^{(4)}	n/a		
1997	Jason Gardener	Donna Fraser	1997	Ian Mackie	Simmone Jacobs

AAA Championships second era 1998-2006
Year	Men's champion	Women's champion
1998	Darren Campbell	Joice Maduaka
1999	Jason Gardener	Joice Maduaka
2000	Dwain Chambers	Marcia Richardson
2001	Dwain Chambers	Sarah Wilhelmy
2002	Mark Lewis-Francis	Joice Maduaka
2003	Darren Campbell ^{(2)}	Joice Maduaka
2004	Jason Gardener	Abiodun Oyepitan
2005	Jason Gardener ^{(4)}	Laura Turner
2006	Marlon Devonish	Joice Maduaka
British Athletics Championships 2007 to present
Year	Men's champion	Women's champion
2007	Marlon Devonish ^{(2)}	Jeanette Kwakye
2008	Dwain Chambers	Jeanette Kwakye
2009	Simeon Williamson	Joice Maduaka ^{(6)}
2010	Dwain Chambers	Laura Turner ^{(2)}
2011	Dwain Chambers	Jeanette Kwakye ^{(3)}
2012	Dwain Chambers	Ashleigh Nelson
2013	Dwain Chambers	Asha Philip
2014	Dwain Chambers ^{(8)}	Asha Philip
2015	Chijindu Ujah	Dina Asher-Smith
2016	James Dasaolu	Asha Philip
2017	Reece Prescod	Asha Philip ^{(4)}
2018	Reece Prescod ^{(2)}	Dina Asher-Smith
2019	Ojie Edoburun	Dina Asher-Smith
2020	Harry Aikines-Aryeetey	Imani Lansiquot
2021	Chijindu Ujah ^{(2)}	Dina Asher-Smith
2022	Jeremiah Azu	Daryll Neita
2023	Zharnel Hughes	Dina Asher-Smith ^{(5)}
2024	Louie Hinchliffe	Daryll Neita ^{(2)}
2025	Zharnel Hughes ^{(2)}	Amy Hunt
2026	Romell Glave	Amy Hunt ^{(2)}

=== Most titles ===
('AAA continuity' only; athletes in bold still active)

100 metres - most titles
Titles	Men	Women
9	Linford Christie (1986, 1988-94, 1996)	—
8	Dwain Chambers (2000-01, 2008, 2010-14)	—
7	McDonald Bailey (1946-47, 1949-53)	—
6	—	Joice Maduaka (1998-99, 2002-03, 2006, 2009)
5	John Morton (1904-08)	**Dina Asher-Smith** (2015, 2018-19, 2021, 2023); Paula Dunn Thomas (1986-89, 1995); Dorothy Hyman (1959-60, 1962-63, 1969); Eileen Hiscock (1930, 1933-36)
4	5 athletes	5 athletes

== Notes ==
+Lincoln Asquith finished fifth and was the leading British athlete.
