= 1891 AAA Championships =

Outdoor track and field competition

- Dates: 29 June 1891
- Host city: Manchester, England
- Venue: Manchester AA Grounds, Old Trafford
- Level: Senior
- Type: Outdoor
- Events: 14

The 1891 AAA Championships was an outdoor track and field competition organised by the Amateur Athletic Association (AAA), held on Saturday 29 June 1891 at the grounds of the Manchester Athletic Association in Old Trafford, Manchester, England.

The 14 events were the same number and disciplines as in the previous year.

== Results ==
| Event | Gold | | Silver | | Bronze | |
|---|---|---|---|---|---|---|
| 100 yards | (United States) Luther Cary | 10.2 | E. Kirkwood House | 3 yd | William Seward | ½ yd |
| 440 yards | (United States) Alfred Remington | 51.8 | J.P. Shuter | 6 yd | only 2 finished | |
| 880 yards | William Holmes | 2:00.8 | Harold Wade | 4 yd | Alfred Le Maitre | inches |
| 1 mile | James Kibblewhite | 4:28.6 | William Fowler | 1½ yd | Herbert Heath | 15 yd |
| 4 miles | William Morton | 20:53.6 | J.R. Hainsworth | 21:02.2 | only 2 finished | |
| 10 miles | William Morton | 52:33.8 | Sidney Thomas | 52:36.8 | (Scotland) Andrew Hannah | 54:46.2 |
| steeplechase | Edward Parry | 11:24.8 | L'Argent Keer | 170 yd | Colin Souch | dnf |
| 120yd hurdles | (Leinster) Daniel Bulger | 16.3-5 sec | C. W. Haward | | Godfrey Shaw | |
| 7 miles walk | Harry Curtis | 54:00.2 | John Wells | 56:24.4 | (United States) Charles Nicoll | 56:34.2 |
| high jump | Thomas Jennings | 1.765 | Arthur Watkinson (United States) Henry Hallock | 1.740; 1.740 | not awarded | |
| pole jump | Robert Watson | 3.43 | Robert Dickinson | 3.35 | Tom Ray | 3.12 |
| long jump | (Leinster) Daniel Bulger (United States) Malcolm Ford | 6.20; 6.20 | not awarded | | Cecil Haward | 5.87 |
| shot put | (Leinster) William Barry | 12.09 | (United States) Charles Queckberner | 11.53 | Harry Brown | |
| hammer throw | (United States) Charles Queckberner | 39.58 | (Scotland) R. Nelson Robbie | 38.78 | (Leinster) William Barry | 35.26 |
