= 1889 AAA Championships =

Outdoor track and field competition

- Dates: 29 June 1889
- Host city: London, England
- Venue: Stamford Bridge (stadium)
- Level: Senior
- Type: Outdoor
- Events: 14

The 1889 AAA Championships was an outdoor track and field competition organised by the Amateur Athletic Association (AAA), held on Saturday 29 June 1889 at the Stamford Bridge (stadium) in London, England in front of 2,800 spectators.

The 14 events were the same number and disciplines as in the previous year.

Henry Tindall set a new world record of 48.5 seconds in the 440 yards event.

== Results ==
Event	Gold		Silver		Bronze	
100 yards	Ernest Pelling	10.4	Monte Billimore	1 yd	J.F. Veneer	1 yd
440 yards	Henry Tindall	48.5 WR	Ernest Pelling	6-7 yd	Ernest Fryer	1 ft
880 yards	Henry Tindall	1.56.4	Thomas Pitman	12 yd	G.H. Pillin	5 yd
1 mile	James Kibblewhite	4.29.9	Walter Uriah Churley	4.31.6	(Scotland) David Duncan	4.32.4
4 miles	Sidney Thomas	20.31.8	Charles Rogers	20.39.6	J.R. Hainsworth	20.56.4
10 miles	Sidney Thomas	51.31.4	James Kibblewhite	51.40.4	Harold Wade	54.34.8
steeplechase	Thomas White	11.34.4	S. Jones	20 yd	only 2 finished	
120yd hurdles	Cecil Haward	16.4	Charles Daft	inches	Sherard Joyce	1 yd
7 miles walk	William Wheeler	56.29.4	Harry Curtis	57.00.2	W. Curtis	57.22.4
high jump	Thomas Jennings	1.765	Cecil Haward	1.715	B.C. Green	1.600
pole jump	Lat Stones	3.39	Tom Ray	3.35	R. Herschell	3.05
long jump	(Leinster) Daniel Bulger	6.55	(Scotland) J. Barbour	6.20	(Leinster) P Lawless	6.06
shot put	R.A. Greene & (Leinster) William Barry	12.09	not awarded		W.E. West	10.87
hammer throw	(Leinster) William Barry	39.62	(Leinster) P Lawless	35.22	(Leinster) J.P. O'Sullivan	33.22
