= List of British champions in 1500 metres =

The British 1,500 metres athletics champions covers four competitions; the current British Athletics Championships which was founded in 2007, the preceding AAA Championships (1880-2006), the Amateur Athletic Club Championships (1866-1879) and finally the UK Athletics Championships which existed from 1977 until 1997 and ran concurrently with the AAA Championships.

The AAA Championships were open to international athletes but were not considered the National Champion in this list if they won the relevant Championship.

Between 1977 and 1994, and again in 1997, two events effectively crowned national champions each year. The official UK Athletics Championships (not to be confused with the current championships, a rebranded British Athletics Championships) were specifically only open to British nationals and were organised by the national governing body. The AAA Championships continued, and due to their history, continued to be considered by both statisticians and athletes to be the more prestigious championships, with the exception of 1997 where the UK Championships were considered the principle championships for the only time. Winners at the UK Championships were nonetheless considered as having won a national title.

The UK Athletics Championships ceased to exist upon the insolvency of the governing body, the British Athletics Federation. The AAA championships continued until 2006, before they were replaced by the new British Athletics Championships. Sydney Wooderson, John Mayock and Rita Ridley are the most successful athletes in th event, with six victories each.

== Past winners ==
AAC Championships 1 mile, men's event only
Year	Men's champion
1866	Charles Lawes-Wittewronge
1867	Samuel Scott
1868	Walter Chinnery
1869	Walter Chinnery
1870	Robert Benson
1871	Walter Chinnery ^{(3)}
1872	Charles Mason
1873	Walter Slade
1874	Walter Slade
1875	Walter Slade
1876	Walter Slade
1877	Walter Slade ^{(5)}
1878	Arnold Hills
1879	Walter George

AAA Championships 1 mile, men's event only
Year	Men's champion
1880	Walter George
1881	Walter George
1882	Walter George
1883	William Snook
1884	Walter George ^{(5)}
1885	William Snook ^{(2)}
1886	Thomas Nalder
1887	Francis Cross
1888	William Pollock-Hill
1889	James Kibblewhite
1890	James Kibblewhite
1891	James Kibblewhite ^{(3)}
1892	Harold Wade
1893	Fred Bacon
1894	Fred Bacon
1895	Fred Bacon ^{(3)}
1896	Benson Lawford
1897	Alfred Tysoe
1898	Hugh Welsh
1899	Hugh Welsh ^{(2)}
1900	Charles Bennett
1901	Francis Cockshott
1902	Joseph Binks
1903	Alfred Shrubb
1904	Alfred Shrubb ^{(2)}
1905	George Butterfield
1906	George Butterfield
1907	George Butterfield ^{(3)}
1908	Harold A. Wilson
1909	Eddie Owen
1910	Emil Voigt
1911	Douglas McNicol
1912	Eddie Owen ^{(2)}
1913	Gerald Gorringe
1914	George Hutson
1919	Albert Hill
1920	Duncan McPhee
1921	Albert Hill ^{(2)}
1922	Duncan McPhee ^{(2)}
1923	Henry Stallard
1924	William Seagrove
1925	Bertram Macdonald
1926	Thomas Riddell
1927	Cyril Ellis
1928	Cyril Ellis
1929	Cyril Ellis ^{(3)}
1930	Reg Thomas
1931	Reg Thomas
1932	Jerry Cornes
1933	Reg Thomas ^{(3)}
1934	Sydney Wooderson
1935	Sydney Wooderson

AAA Championships & WAAA Championships
Year	Men's champion	Year	Women's champion
1 mile
1936	Sydney Wooderson	1936	Gladys Lunn
1937	Sydney Wooderson	1937	Gladys Lunn ^{(2)}
1938	Sydney Wooderson	1938	Doris Harris Roden
1939	Sydney Wooderson ^{(6)}	1939	Evelyne Forster
1945	nc	1945	Pat Sandall
1946	Doug Wilson	1946	Brenda Harris
1947	Bill Nankeville	1947	Nellie Batson
1948	Bill Nankeville	1948	Nellie Batson ^{(2)}
1949	Bill Nankeville	1949	Eileen Garritt
1950	Bill Nankeville	1950	Joyce Heath
1951	Roger Bannister	1951	Hazel Needham
1952	Bill Nankeville ^{(5)}	1952	Anne Oliver
1953	Roger Bannister	1953	Enid Harding
1954	Roger Bannister ^{(3)}	1954	Phyllis Green
1955	Brian Hewson	1955	Phyllis Perkins ^{(2)}
1956	Ken Wood	1956	Diane Leather
1957	Brian Hewson ^{(2)}	1957	Diane Leather ^{(2)}
1958	Ken Wood	1958	Maureen Smith
1959	Ken Wood	1959	Joan Briggs
1960	Mike Wiggs	1960	Roma Ashby
1961	Ken Wood ^{(4)}	1961	Roma Ashby ^{(2)}
1962	Stan Taylor	1962	Madeleine Ibbotson
1963	Alan Simpson	1963	Pamela Davies
1964	Alan Simpson	1964	Alison Leggett
1965	Alan Simpson ^{(3)}	1965	Joyce Smith
1966	Walter Wilkinson	1966	Rita Lincoln
1967	Andy Green	1967	Rita Lincoln
1968	John Whetton	1968	Rita Lincoln
1,500 metres - metrification
1969	John Whetton ^{(2)}	1969	Rita Ridley (née Lincoln)
1970	Walter Wilkinson ^{(2)}	1970	Rita Ridley
1971	Peter Stewart	1971	Rita Ridley ^{(6)}
1972	Peter Stewart ^{(2)}	1972	Joyce Smith ^{(2)}
1973	Frank Clement	1973	Joan Allison
1974	Ray Smedley	1974	Christine Tranter
1975	Frank Clement	1975	Mary Stewart
1976	David Moorcroft	1976	Penny Yule

AAA Championships/WAAA Championships & UK Athletics Championships dual championships era 1977-1987
Year	AAA Men	Year	WAAA Women	Year	UK Men	UK Women
1977	Glen Grant	1977	Penny Yule ^{(2)}	1977	Steve Ovett	Lesley Kiernan
1978	David Moorcroft ^{(2)}	1978	Cherry Hanson	1978	John Robson	Hilary Hollick
1979	Steve Ovett	1979	Mary Stewart ^{(2)}	1979	Alan Mottershead	Gillian Dainty
1980	Steve Ovett ^{(2)}	1980	Gillian Dainty	1980	David Moorcroft	Jo White+
1981	Steve Cram	1981	Gillian Dainty	1981	Steve Ovett ^{(2)}	Gillian Dainty ^{(2)}
1982	Steve Cram	1982	Christina Boxer	1982	Alan Mottershead ^{(2)}	Carole Bradford
1983	Steve Cram ^{(3)}	1983	Gillian Green (née Dainty) ^{(3)}	1983	John Gladwin	Kathy Carter
1984	Peter Elliott	1984	Christine Benning ^{(2)}	1984	Alan Salter	Zola Budd
1985	Alistair Currie	1985	Julie-Ann Laughton	1985	Mark Rowland	Bridget Smyth
1986	John Gladwin	1986	Zola Budd	1986	Rob Harrison	Christina Boxer
1987	Steve Crabb	1987	Bev Nicholson	1987	Neil Horsfield	Christine Benning

AAA Championships & UK Athletics Championships dual championships era 1988-1997
Year	Men AAA	Women AAA	Year	Men UK	Women UK
1988	Peter Elliott ^{(2)}	Christina Cahill	1988	Richard McDonnell	Bev Nicholson
1989	Sebastian Coe	Bev Nicholson ^{(2)}	1989	Richard McDonnell ^{(2)}	Bev Nicholson
1990	Neil Horsfield	Christina Cahill ^{(3)}	1990	Neil Horsfield ^{(2)}	Alison Wyeth
1991	Matthew Yates	Ann Williams	1991	Simon Fairbrother	Alison Wyeth ^{(2)}
1992	Kevin McKay	Yvonne Murray	1992	Steve Crabb	Bev Nicholson ^{(3)}
1993	Matthew Yates ^{(2)}	Alison Wyeth	1993	Curtis Robb	Jayne Spark
1994	Kevin McKay ^{(2)}	Kelly Holmes	n/a		
1995	John Mayock	Yvonne Murray ^{(2)}	n/a		
1996	John Mayock	Kelly Holmes	n/a		
1997	Richard Ashe	Dianne Henigan	1997	John Mayock	Jo Pavey

AAA Championships second era 1998-2006
Year	Men's champion	Women's champion
1998	John Mayock	Lynn Gibson
1999	John Mayock	Hayley Tullett
2000	John Mayock	Hayley Tullett
2001	John Mayock ^{(6)}	Helen Pattinson
2002	Tony Whiteman	Kelly Holmes ^{(3)}
2003	Michael East	Hayley Tullett
2004	Chris Mulvaney	Hayley Tullett ^{(4)}
2005	Nick McCormick	Helen Clitheroe
2006	Andrew Baddeley	Helen Clitheroe ^{(3)}

British Athletics Championships 2007 to present
Year	Men's champion	Women's champion
2008	Tom Lancashire	Lisa Dobriskey
2009	Jermaine Mays	Charlene Thomas
2010	Andrew Baddeley	Hannah England
2011	James Shane	Hannah England
2012	Andrew Baddeley ^{(3)}	Laura Weightman
2013	Chris O'Hare	Hannah England ^{(3)}
2014	Charlie Grice	Laura Weightman
2015	Charlie Grice	Laura Muir
2016	Charlie Grice ^{(3)}	Laura Muir
2017	Chris O'Hare	Laura Weightman
2018	Chris O'Hare ^{(3)}	Laura Weightman
2019	Neil Gourley	Sarah McDonald
2020	George Mills	Laura Weightman ^{(5)}
2021	Josh Kerr	Revée Walcott-Nolan
2022	Jake Wightman	Laura Muir ^{(3)}
2023	Neil Gourley	Katie Snowden
2024	Neil Gourley	Georgia Bell
2025	Neil Gourley ^{(4)}	Sarah Calvert
2026	Arlo Ludewick	Sarah Calvert ^{(2)}

nc = not contested

=== Most titles ===
('AAA continuity' only; athletes in bold still active)

1500 metres - most titles
Titles	Men	Women
6	Sydney Wooderson (1934-39); John Mayock (1995-96, 1998-2001)	Rita Ridley (1965-1971)
5	Walter Slade (1873-77); Walter George (1879-82, 1884); Bill Nankeville (1947-50, 1952)	Laura Weightman (2012, 2014, 2017-18, 2020)
4	Ken Wood (1956, 1958-59, 1961); **Neil Gourley** (2019, 2023-25)	Hayley Tullett (1999-2000, 2003-2004)
3	12 athletes	6 athletes (1 active)
