= 1887 AAA Championships =

Outdoor track and field competition

- Dates: 2 July 1887
- Host city: Stourbridge, England
- Venue: Stourbridge Cricket Ground
- Level: Senior
- Type: Outdoor
- Events: 14

The 1887 AAA Championships was an outdoor track and field competition organised by the Amateur Athletic Association (AAA), held on Saturday 2 July 1887 at Stourbridge Cricket Ground, Stourbridge, England.

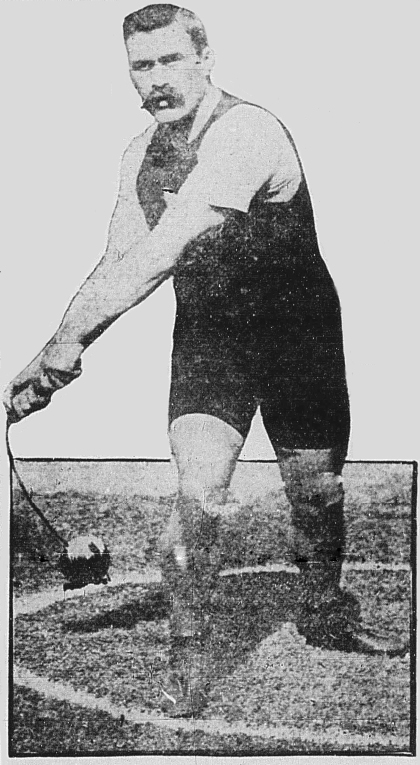
Irishman James Mitchel

The 14 events were the same number and disciplines as in the previous year.

== Results ==
Event	Gold		Silver		Bronze	
100 yards	Arthur Wharton	10.1	Charles Wood	½ yd	Herbert Fletcher	10.37
440 yards	Charles Wood	51.0	Alfred Le Maitre	7 yd	Alfred Hind	5 yd
880 yards	Francis Cross	1.59.0	Alfred Le Maitre	3½ yd	only 2 finished	
1 mile	Francis Cross	4.25.4	James Kibblewhite	2 yd	F. Mills	10 yd
4 miles	(United States) Edward Carter	21.10.0	F. Mills	21.33.6	only 2 finished	
10 miles	(United States) Edward Carter	55.09.0	A. Houlding	57.01.0	Sidney Thomas	57.37.0
steeplechase	M.A. Harrison	12.08.4	E. Wall	120-220 yd	only 2 competed	
120yd hurdles	John Le Fleming	16.2	Sherard Joyce	1¼ yd	Arthur Gould	¾ yd
7 miles walk	(United States) Christopher Clarke	56.59.8	(United States) Edward Lange	57.00.0	J.R. Lewis	57.52.5
high jump	George Rowdon & (United States) William Page	1.829	not awarded		(United States) Francis Fogg	1.753
pole vault	Tom Ray	3.38	F.G.F. Thompson	3.05	T. Stanley Green	2.89
long jump	Francis Roberts	6.81	(Leinster) John Purcell	6.63	only 2 competed	
shot put	(Leinster) James Mitchel	11.92	F.G.F. Thompson	11.21	Tom Stone	11.00
hammer throw	(Leinster) James Mitchel	37.80	F.G.F. Thompson	23.78	only 2 competed	
