= Ernest Ion Pool =

British athlete

Personal information
- Nationality: British (English)
- Born: 22 November 1857 Westminster, London, England
- Died: 26 September 1931 (aged 73) Hastings, England

Sport
- Sport: Athletics
- Event: marathon
- Club: London Athletic Club

Ernest Ion Pool (22 November 1857 – 26 September 1931) was a British athlete who competed in the Marathon at the 1900 Olympic Games in Paris.

== Biography ==
Pool was born in Westminster, London, England and was a member of the London Athletic Club.

Having finished third in the 1899 London to Brighton race, Pool was selected for the British marathon team to compete in the 1900 Olympic Games. However, he was one of six runners who did not finish the race, attributed to the warm weather on the day.

After he returned to England he wrote an article for the club magazine of the South London Harriers commenting on his experiences;

"The marathon turned out a dismal fiasco. The whole conduct of the race on the part of

the responsible officials, beginning with the tardy date of the announcement abroad down to the smallest details providing, or rather failing to provide, for the convenience of contestants on the fatal day, and the entire absence of precautions to ensure fair play, can only be characterized by the one word “Presposterous” – with a capital P.

Add to this the non-sporting instincts of the French populace and it will not be necessary to cite fully the details of the troubles that invariably beset the strangers only bicycles and cars for obstacles.

At the best it proved a steeplechase, 25 miles is really too far for a steeplechase, but that was with mere circumstance. Suffice it to say that when the three placed men in last year's London to Brighton GAYP found it necessary to retire inside of four miles and Arthur Newton (a well known long distance record breaker in the States), who was unwise enough to finish, took longer than walking time to complete the distance, it shows that things were very, very wrong.

I could a further tale unfold...but 'no mattah.'"

Pool was a dentist by trade (as was his father). In addition to being a long distance runner he was a cyclist and race walker.
