= Joslyn Hoyte-Smith =

British sprinter (born 1954)

Joslyn Hoyte-Smith MBE OLY
Personal information
- Nationality: British/Barbadian
- Born: 16 December 1954 (age 71) Barbados
- Height: 163 cm (5 ft 4 in)
- Weight: 52 kg (115 lb)

Sport
- Sport: Athletics
- Event: Sprints/400m
- Club: Dorothy Hyman Track Club
Medal record
Women's athletics
Representing Great Britain
Olympic Games
Bronze medal – third place	1980 Moscow	4 x 400m Relay
Representing England
Commonwealth Games
Gold medal – first place	1978 Edmonton	4 x 400m Relay
Bronze medal – third place	1982 Brisbane	400m

Joslyn Yvonne Hoyte, married name Smith MBE (born 16 December 1954) is a British/Barbadian former 400 metres athlete who competed at the 1980 Summer Olympics.

== Biography ==
Hoyte grew up in Leeds, England, and attended Matthew Murray High School between 1966 and 1973.

Hoyte finished third behind Sonia Lannaman in the 200 metres event at the 1977 WAAA Championships before British 400 metres champion after winning the British WAAA Championships title at the 1978 WAAA Championships. She represented England and won a gold medal in the 4x400 metres relay event, at the 1978 Commonwealth Games in Edmonton, Alberta, Canada.

Hoyte married Kenneth Smith in Barnsley in early 1979 and competed under the name Hoyte-Smith thereafter.

At the 1980 Olympics Games in Moscow, Hoyte-Smith represented Great Britain, where, as part of the women's 4×400 metres relay team, she won a bronze medal. In 1981 she regained her 400 metres WAAA title at the 1981 WAAA Championships.

Four years later, she represented England and won a bronze medal in the 400 metres event, at the 1982 Commonwealth Games in Brisbane, Australia.

Hoyte-Smith ran in the 4×400 metres relay team at the 1984 Summer Olympics in Los Angeles. She was the winner of the 400 metres race at the UK Championships in 1979, 1981 and 1983.

She now lives in Kent, England, and is currently Athlete Support Manager for Yorkshire. Hoyte-Smith is chair of the GB Olympians, the national association for Olympic athletes.

Hoyte-Smith was appointed Member of the Order of the British Empire (MBE) in the 2024 New Year Honours for services to athletics.

== Personal bests ==
Her personal best in the 400 metres was 50.75 seconds, achieved in 1982.
