= Michael George Glazebrook =

British educationalist

Michael Glazebrook
Personal information
- Born: 4 August 1853 London, England
- Died: 1 May 1926 (aged 72) Ely, Cambridgeshire, England

Sport
- Sport: Athletics
- Event: High jump

Michael George Glazebrook was a Headmaster of Clifton College, later a Canon of Ely, and once held the world record for the high jump.

== Early life ==
Michael George Glazebrook was born in 1853. He was the son of M. G. Glazebrook and first cousin of the famous mathematician and physicist Richard Tetley Glazebrook and brother of the portrait painter Hugh de Twenbrokes Glazebrook (1855–1937). Like his cousin, he studied at Dulwich College and went on to study at Balliol College, Oxford in both Classics and Maths, where he received First Class Honours.

== Sporting achievement ==
At Oxford, Glazebrook was an athletics blue and won the Varsity Match high jump in 1875 and went on to become the British Amateur Champion in that year after winning the 1875 AAC Championships.

Prior to 1912, the high jump world record was not ratified by the IAAF and therefore there is only an unofficial progression. However, on 22 March 1875 Glazebrook is said to have jumped 1.80m (equalling a mark set by Marshall Brooks) which at the time was the highest thus far attained.

== Master of students ==
Glazebrook worked briefly at Harrow and then was called to Manchester Grammar School in 1888 to replace Dill as High Master. Years later one of the students, Ernest Barker, recalled his presence:

[Glazebrook] gave me the impression of competence and of being in the general trend and current of educational advance; but I did not feel, though I may well have been mistaken, that he had the scholarship either of his predecessor or successor. He had married a lady who was kind to us boys, and in a stately way he sought to be kind himself. But in those days he seemed to me very 'high and lifted up' (I did not feel like that when I came to know him on more equal terms, thirty years later, when he was a Cannon of Ely and I was the principal of a London school.)

While at Manchester he was Elected to membership of the Manchester Literary and Philosophical Society on 7 January 1890

In 1891 he became the Headmaster of Clifton College. This post was one that had been held by two previous appointments, John Percival and James Wilson, both of whom had encouraged science as a subject at the school (which still today has a strong tradition having had three Nobel laureates). Having studied classics and mathematics at Balliol College, Oxford, Glazebrook seemed the ideal candidate. He held the post until 1905. However, he has been described in this role as having been a regrettably forbidding man, nicknamed "The Bogey" by his pupils. Although he was successful in maintaining excellent academic standards and a high moral tone, and although he had a reputation for having promoted music in the school, he was not popular and this was reflected in the steady decline in numbers at Clifton during his time.

The pride in his earlier sporting achievements was evident in the fact that his medals were framed and hung outside his Clifton study for all to see.

== Canon of Ely ==
He held the office of Canon of Ely from 1905 to 1926. During this time he chaired the Governing Body of Ripon Hall from 1919 to 1924. He graduated with a Doctor of Divinity (D.D.).

== Family and later life ==
On 29 July 1880 he married Ethel Brodie, the daughter of the chemist Sir Benjamin Collins Brodie, 2nd Baronet, and Philothea Margaret Thompson. He died on 1 May 1926.

Academic offices
Preceded by Samuel Dill	High Masters of Manchester Grammar School; 1888–1890	Succeeded by John Edward King
Preceded by James Wilson	Headmaster of Clifton College; 1891–1905	Succeeded by Albert Augustus David
