= 1977 WAAA Championships =

British athletics event

- Dates: 19–20 August
- Host city: London
- Venue: Crystal Palace National Sports Centre
- Level: Senior
- Type: Outdoor

The 1977 WAAA Championships were the national track and field championships for women in the United Kingdom.

The event was held at the Crystal Palace National Sports Centre, London, from 19 to 20 August 1977.

1977 saw the introduction of the UK Athletics Championships, which was open to British athletes only. Although designed to rival the AAA and WAAA Championships it failed to attract all of the leading British athletes.

== Results ==
Event	Gold		Silver		Bronze	
100 metres	Sonia Lannaman	11.24	Sharon Colyear	11.35	Val Peat	11.87
200 metres	Sonia Lannaman	23.06	Donna Hartley	23.40	Joslyn Hoyte	23.95
400 metres	Verona Elder	52.3	Gladys McCormack	53.3	Christine Warden	53.7
800 metres	Christina Boxer	2:03.78	Angela Creamer	2:04.04	Janet Prictoe	2:04.88
1500 metres	Penny Yule	4:12.71	Mary Stewart	4:13.74	Janet Lawrence	4:14.40
3000 metres	Carol Gould	9:20.71	Val Rowe	9:23.32	Annette Roberts	9:24.64
100 metres hurdles	Lorna Boothe	13.48	Shirley Strong	13.76	Tessa Sanderson	13.93
400 metres hurdles	(Scotland) Liz Sutherland	57.93	(Australia) Marian Fisher	59.25	Frances McCall	60.24
High jump	Brenda Gibbs	1.85	Kathy Warren	1.79	(Scotland) Moira Walls	1.76
Long jump	Sue Reeve	6.31	Sharon Colyear	6.30	Sue Longden	6.04
Shot put	Brenda Bedford	15.79	Angela Littlewood	15.49	Judy Oakes	15.30
Discus throw	(Scotland) Meg Ritchie	53.98	Janis Kerr	45.28	Janet Beese	44.12
Javelin	Tessa Sanderson	59.96	Sandra O'Toole	48.98	Yvonne Gregory	48.02
Pentathlon +	Sue Longden	4152 NR	Yvette Wray	3930	Susan Wright	3897
5000 metres walk	Marion Fawkes	24:50.6	Judy Farr	25:04.6	Pamela Branson	26:13.0

+ Held on 8 May at Wolverhampton

== See also ==
- 1977 AAA Championships
