= Gillian Dainty =

English middle-distance runner

Gillian Green née Dainty
Personal information
- Nationality: British (English)
- Born: 24 November 1958 (age 67) Birmingham, England

Sport
- Sport: Athletics
- Event: middle-distance
- Club: Birchfield Harriers
Medal record
Athletics
Representing England
Commonwealth Games
Silver medal – second place	1982 Brisbane	1,500m

Gillian Green (née Dainty) (born 24 November 1958), is a female former athlete who competed for England.

== Biography ==
Dainty became the British 1500 champion after winning the British WAAA Championships title at the 1980 WAAA Championships and retained her title the following year at the 1981 WAAA Championships.

Dainty represented England and won a silver medal in the 1,500 metres, at the 1982 Commonwealth Games in Brisbane, Australia.

Dainty married Ian Green in Walsall in 1983 and competed under her married name thereafter and shortly afterwards won her third WAAA title at the 1983 WAAA Championships.

Three years later she represented England in the 1,500 metres event again, at the 1986 Commonwealth Games in Edinburgh, Scotland.
