= 1981 WAAA Championships =

British athletics event

- Dates: 24–25 July
- Host city: London
- Venue: Crystal Palace National Sports Centre
- Level: Senior
- Type: Outdoor

The 1981 WAAA Championships sponsored by Sunsilk, were the national track and field championships for women in the United Kingdom.

The event was held at the Crystal Palace National Sports Centre, London, from 24 to 25 July 1981.

The Pentathlon became the Heptathlon following the addition of two disciplines.

== Results ==
Event	Gold		Silver		Bronze	
100 metres	Wendy Hoyte	11.73	Sonia Lannaman	11.77	Shirley Thomas	11.90
200 metres	Sonia Lannaman	23.14	Joslyn Hoyte-Smith	23.34	Janine MacGregor	23.63
400 metres	Joslyn Hoyte-Smith	51.70	Linda Forsyth	53.48	(Scotland) Alison Reid	53.92
800 metres	(Scotland) Anne Clarkson	2:03.92	Lorraine Baker	2:04.21	(Wales) Kirsty McDermott	2:05.63
1,500 metres	Gillian Dainty	4:12.26	Paula Fudge	4:13.02	Janet Marlow	4:14.34
3,000 metres	(United States) Cathie Twomey	9:05.39	Val Rowe	9:05.99	(Republic of Ireland) Regina Joyce	9:18.02
5,000 metres	Kathryn Binns	16:23.35	(Wales) Hilary Hollick	16:44.14	Carole Bradford	16:44.63
10,000 metres	Kathryn Binns	33:56.3	Alison Blake	36:09.8	Kim Webb	37:56.9
marathon+	(Scotland) Leslie Watson	2:49:08	Gillian Burley	2:52:40	Véronique Marot	2:53:39
100 metres hurdles	Shirley Strong	13.36	Tessa Sanderson	13.46	Diane Greenidge	13.84
400 metres hurdles	Christine Warden	56.75	Sue Morley	58.10	(Scotland) Margaret Southerden	58.59
High jump	Ann-Marie Cording	1.90	Diana Elliott	1.76	Brenda Gibbs	1.80
Long jump	Allison Manley	6.27	Carol Earlington	6.24	Barbara Clarke	6.15
Shot put	Angela Littlewood	16.26	(Zimbabwe) Mariette Van Heerden	15.26	Helen Clarke	14.59
Discus throw	(Scotland) Meg Ritchie	62.22	(Zimbabwe) Mariette Van Heerden	52.40	Lesley Bryant	52.06
Javelin	Fatima Whitbread	57.74	Jeanette Rose	54.50	Sharon Gibson	51.44
Heptathlon ++	Kathy Warren	5674	Sarah Owen	5519	Joanne Taylor	5097
5,000 metres walk	Carol Tyson	23:12.55	Irene Bateman	23:48.10	(Canada) Ann Peel	23:50.85
10,000 metres walk	Irene Bateman	49:54.3	Lillian Millen	52:58.3	Jill Barrett	53:11.4

- + Held on 10 May at Rugby
- ++ Held on 8 & 9 August at the Alexander Stadium

== See also ==
- 1981 AAA Championships
