= Marshall Brooks =

British sportsman

The Hon. Marshall Jones Brooks
- Born: Marshall Jones Brooks; 30 May 1855 Crawshawbooth, Lancashire, England
- Died: 5 January 1944 (aged 88) Tarporley, Cheshire, England
- School: Rugby School
- University: Brasenose College, Oxford

Rugby union career
- Position: Fullback
Amateur team(s)
Years	Team	Apps	(Points)
-	Oxford University		
International career
Years	Team	Apps	(Points)
1874	England	1	

Marshall Jones Brooks (30 May 1855 – 5 January 1944) was a nineteenth-century sportsman who was the British Amateur High jump champion in 1874 and 1876, world record holder for the High jump on three occasions, as well as a rugby union international who represented England in 1874.

== Early life ==
The Hon. Marshall Jones Brooks was born on 30 May 1855 in Crawshawbooth, Lancashire, the second son of Thomas Brooks, 1st Baron Crawshaw of Crawshaw Hall and Catherine Jones. He attended Rugby School and went on to study at Brasenose College, Oxford from where he received his Master of Arts (M.A.).

== Rugby union career ==
Brooks, having played for the Rugby School side, continued his playing at Oxford and there won a blue. From Oxford he was called up for England, and made his only international appearance on 23 February 1874 at The Oval against Scotland.

== Athletics ==
At Oxford, Brooks was also an athletics blue and won the Varsity Match high jump in both 1874 and 1876 and went on to become the British Amateur Champion in both those years after winning the AAC Championships.

Prior to 1912, the high jump world record was not ratified by the IAAF and therefore there is only an unofficial progression. However, on 30 March 1874, Brooks jumped 1.80m which at the time was the highest thus far recorded in the world. The mark was the next year equaled by a fellow Oxford student, Michael George Glazebrook, but on 17 March 1876, in Oxford, Brooks broke the record by jumping 1.83m. He broke this the next month in London at Lillie Bridge Grounds, jumping 1.89m on 7 April 1876. This mark stood for four years until broken by Patrick Davin of Ireland on 5 July 1880, in Garrick.

== Later life and family ==
Brooks married Florence Thomas, the daughter of Frederick Freeman Thomas and Hon. Mabel Brand, on 29 April 1889 with whom he had the following children:

1. Dorothy Brooks b. 22 Mar 1890
2. Thomas Marshall Brooks b. 23 Feb 1893, d. 15 Sep 1967
3. Noel Brand Brooks b. 17 Dec 1896, d. 1984
4. Marjorie Nell Brooks b. 11 Dec 1901, d. 1993, married Thomas Ashton, 2nd Baron Ashton of Hyde.

Brooks at one point held the office of Justice of the Peace for Cheshire and also the office of Justice of the Peace for Lancashire. He died on 5 January 1944 in Tarporley, Cheshire, England.
