= Daniel Delany Bulger =

Irish athlete (1865–1930)

Personal information
- Nationality: Irish
- Born: 18 December 1865
- Died: 8 December 1930 (aged 64) Hampstead, London, England

Sport
- Sport: Athletics

Daniel Delany Bulger (18 December 1865 – 8 December 1930) was a leading Irish athlete. Along with his younger brothers, Michael Joseph Bulger (1867–1938) and Lawrence Bulger (1870–1928), he was prominent in the Irish sporting world in the late 19th century. Daniel was one of the 79 delegates who attended the Congress of the Sorbonne in Paris in 1894 that lit the flame of the Olympic Games of the Modern Era in Athens in 1896.

== Family background ==
The Bulger family were from Moore Street, Kilrush, County Clare, where their father, Daniel Scanlan Bulger (1831–1904), was a woollen merchant and draper and ran a loan office. Around 1880, the family moved to Dublin, where Daniel Scanlan Bulger became a member of the Dublin Stock Exchange and his sons were educated at Blackrock College and Trinity College Dublin, from where Daniel Delany Bulger graduated with a BA degree in 1886.

== Athletic achievements ==
Between 1885 and 1892, Bulger was the winner of 25 gold medals at Irish athletic championships run by either the Irish Amateur Athletic Association (IAAA) or the Gaelic Athletic Association (GAA).

On 1 August 1887, he set the Irish Native Record for 100 yards of 10.2 seconds at the GAA Championships held at the County Kerry Athletic Club Grounds, Tralee. He held this record, jointly with Norman D. Morgan [1896], Denis Murray [1904], and James P. Roche [1907], until Frederick R. Shaw (Dublin University Athletic Club) clocked 10.0 seconds in Belfast on 20 July 1913. Alaso in 1887, he was a member of the Irish athletics team that visited America.

Between 1889 and 1892, he won five British Amateur Athletic Association Championships. The first was the long jump event at the 1889 AAA Championships and this was followed by two wins in the 1891 AAA Championships in the 120 yards hurdles and long jump. The fourth and fifth titles were at the 1892 AAA Championships, when he repeated the double of hurdles and long jump.

His achievements included multiple Irish championships in each of the 100 yards, 220 yards, 120 yards hurdles, and long jump, as well as British championships in the long jump and 120 yards hurdles. He introduced the crouch start into Irish sprinting.

In the 120 yards hurdles, he equalled the world record of 15.8 seconds at the IAAA championships at Ballsbridge on 1 August 1892.

The full list of his Irish athletics titles is as follows:

IAAA 100 yd Champion:

- 1888 – 10.4 sec [RDS Showgrounds, Ballsbridge, Dublin]
- 1889 – 10.5 sec [RDS Showgrounds, Ballsbridge, Dublin]
- 1890 – 10.6 sec [RDS Showgrounds, Ballsbridge, Dublin]
- 1892 – 10.4 sec [RDS Showgrounds, Ballsbridge, Dublin]

GAA 100 yd Champion

- 1886 – 10.6 sec [RDS Showgrounds, Ballsbridge, Dublin]
- 1887 – 10.2 sec [County Kerry Athletic Club, Tralee]
- 1888 – 10.4 sec [Market's Field, Limerick]
- 1889 – 10.6 sec [Duke's Meadow, Kilkenny]
- 1890 – 10.4 sec [Clonturk Park, Drumcondra, Dublin]

IAAA 220 yd Champion

- 1885 – 24.6 sec [RDS Showgrounds, Ballsbridge, Dublin]
- 1886 – 23.4 sec [RDS Showgrounds, Ballsbridge, Dublin]

GAA 220 yd Champion

- 1886 – 23.8 sec [RDS Showgrounds, Ballsbridge, Dublin]
- 1887 – 24.0 sec [County Kerry Athletic Club, Tralee]
- 1888 – 24.6 sec [Market's Field, Limerick]

IAAA 120 yd Hurdles Champion

- 1888 – 17.0 sec [RDS Showgrounds, Ballsbridge, Dublin]
- 1892 – 16.4 sec [RDS Showgrounds, Ballsbridge, Dublin]

GAA 120 yd Hurdles Champion

- 1887 – 17.6 sec [County Kerry Athletic Club, Tralee]
- 1888 – 17.2 sec [Market's Field, Limerick]
- 1889 – 17.0 sec [Duke's Meadow, Kilkenny]
- 1890 – 16.8 sec [Clonturk Park, Drumcondra, Dublin]

IAAA Long Jump Champion

- 1889 – 20 ft 11½ in [6.39 m] [RDS Showgrounds, Ballsbridge, Dublin]
- 1892 – 22 ft 10 in [6.96 m] [RDS Showgrounds, Ballsbridge, Dublin]

GAA Long Jump Champion

- 1888 – 22 ft 0½ in [6.72 m] [Market's Field, Limerick]
- 1889 – 21 ft 5¼ in [6.53 m] [Duke's Meadow, Kilkenny]
- 1890 – 21 ft 4 in [6.50 m] [Clonturk Park, Drumcondra, Dublin]

His other Irish Championships placings included:

- 1885: Irish Athletic Championship 100 yards – 2nd [RDS Showgrounds, Ballsbridge, Dublin]
- 1886: IAAA Championship 100 yards – 3rd [RDS Showgrounds, Ballsbridge, Dublin]
- 1886: GAA Championship 120 yards Hurdles – 2nd [RDS Showgrounds, Ballsbridge, Dublin]
- 1887: IAAA Championship 100 yards – 2nd [RDS Showgrounds, Ballsbridge, Dublin]
- 1887: IAAA Championship 220 yards - 2nd [RDS Showgrounds, Ballsbridge, Dublin]
- 1887: IAAA Championship 120 yards Hurdles – 2nd [RDS Showgrounds, Ballsbridge, Dublin]
- 1888: IAAA Championship 220 yards – 2nd [RDS Showgrounds, Ballsbridge, Dublin]
- 1888: All-Round Championship – 12 events – 3rd [RDS Showgrounds, Ballsbridge, Dublin]
- 1890: IAAA Championship Long Jump – 2nd [RDS Showgrounds, Ballsbridge, Dublin]
- 1890: All-Round Championship – 10 events – 2nd [RDS Showgrounds, Ballsbridge, Dublin]
- 1891: IAAA Championship 120 yards Hurdles – 2nd [RDS Showgrounds, Ballsbridge, Dublin]

The full list of his British athletics titles is as follows:

AAA Long Jump Champion

- 1889 – 21 ft 6 in [6.55 m] [Stamford Bridge, London]
- 1891 – 20 ft 4 in [6.20 m], equal 1st with Malcolm W. Ford (USA) [Old Trafford, Manchester]
- 1892 – 21 ft 4¼ in [6.51 m] [Stamford Bridge, London]

AAA 120 yd Hurdles Champion

- 1891 – 16.6 sec [Old Trafford, Manchester]
- 1892 – 16.0 sec [Stamford Bridge, London]

== Olympic involvement ==
Bulger was prominent in Irish athletics not only as a successful participant, but also as an administrator. As Vice-president of the I.A.A.A., he was one of the Irish delegates to the Congress of the Sorbonne in 1894, organised by Baron Pierre de Coubertin, resulting in the foundation of the modern Olympic Games in 1896.

From 16 – 24 June 1894 Daniel Bulger and Joseph Magee of the I.A.A.A. Competitions' Committee attended the Congress in Paris, as representatives of the I.A.A.A. This international congress led to the establishment of the Olympic Games of the Modern Era, the creation of the International Olympic Committee and the decision to hold the inaugural Olympic Games in Athens in April 1896. Bulger and Magee played an integral part for Ireland in this momentous Olympic Congress.

== Personal life ==
In 1892, Daniel Delany Bulger was admitted a member of the Dublin Stock Exchange, and taken into partnership by his father. He married his first wife Maria Frances Daly on 18 January 1893 at St. Francis Xavier Church on Upper Gardiner Street in Dublin. Around 1900, they moved to London, where she died in 1904. He remarried in 1910, to Elsie Mary Regnart (1881–1972). During World War I, he held a commission in the East Surrey Regiment and Army Service Corps. He died in Hampstead in 1930.

== Bibliography ==
- White, Cyril (2003) ‘An Irish-French Sporting Connection: Daniel Bulger, Pierre de Coubertin, and the Modern Olympic Games’, pp. 33–44 in S. A. Stacey (ed) Essays on Heroism in Sport in Ireland and France. Lewiston: The Edwin Mellen Press. ISBN 0-7734-6919-2
- Dublin University Harriers and Athletic Club, Trinity's Brightest Stars
