= Walter Slade =

British athlete

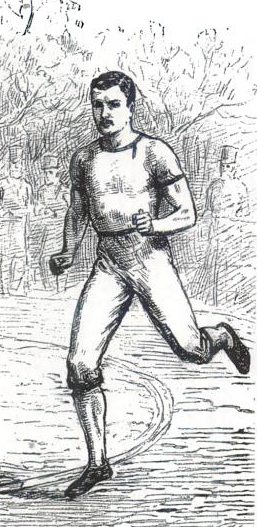
- Walter Slade in 1877

Personal information
- Nationality: English
- Born: 1854
- Died: June 13, 1919 (aged 64–65)

Sport
- Sport: Running
- Event: 1 mile.

Walter Slade (1854 – 13 June 1919) was a nineteenth-century British runner who set a number of world records for the mile as an amateur, but never became a professional athlete.

== Early life ==
Walter Slade was the second son of the stockbroker Adolphus Frederick Slade (1804 to 1875) and his wife Charlotte Amelia Hulme. Walter's paternal grandfather, Henry Slade (1766 to 1834) was the first cousin of Sir John Slade, 1st Baronet. Adolphus Slade was a stockbroker, born in Battersea in 1804. He was forty years old when he married the nineteen-year-old Charlotte Amelia Hulme in 1844 in Battersea. With Charlotte he had twelve children, seven sons and five daughters. The children were born whilst the family resided at Kemnal House in Kent, leased by Adolphus until 1871. Adolphus sent his sons, including Walter, to study at Tonbridge School and at least four of them, again including Walter, followed him into the stock-broking business. Of Walter's siblings at appears that ten survived to adulthood (his brothers, Adolphus Hulme, Edmund, Ernest, Sidney and Herbert, and his sisters Fanny, Florence, Amy, Ada and Laura). His brother Percy appears to have died in infancy. By 1871, Adolphus claimed in the 1871 census that he was a "Landed Proprietor & Occupier of 246 acres of land – Employing 23 labourers, 5 boys & 3 women", rather than a stockbroker.

At school Walter was a noted sportsman, being in both the Cricket Eleven (1870-1) and the Football Thirteen, (1870). He was also a noted runner at school and took this forward as an adult into the world of amateur running events.

== Athletics ==
Walter Slade by contemporary accounts was a natural runner who trained very little. In England the professional milers, Lang and Richards, had set an 1865 record of 4:17.25 for the mile. However, the mile was also a popular event in amateur meets and there the 4:30 was still considered a barrier . This was first broken in 1868 by Walter Moresby Chinnery on 14 March 1868, running in at 4:29.75. Chinnery went on to found the London Athletic Club, but his record was broken on 3 April 1868 by Walter Gibbs. This record held until 1874 when a third Walter, Walter Slade, lowered the amateur record by taking over two seconds off the previous best, lowering the record to 4:26.00 at the Civil Service Sports meet in a race he won from scratch. This event was known as the Strangers' Open Mile, and it was at this race that in 1868 Chinnery had set his record previously.

At the AAC Championships, Walter Slade had already won the English Amateur Mile Championship in 1873, and went on to win it five years in a row from 1873 to 1877.

In 1874 he was also the Four Mile champion. He lowered the mile record to 4:24.25 in 1875 at a London Athletic Club meet at Stamford Bridge. His record was to stand for four years until broken by William Cummings in 1880.

Walter Slade was also on various occasions the fastest amateur on record for the half-mile, two miles and four miles.

Slade was by contemporary accounts about six feet in height and weighing over eleven stone when in strict training. His style was described by Montague Shearman thus: "he ran heavily, crunching the cinders as he sped over the path."

== Career ==
Walter followed his father into stockbroking and became a Member of the London Stock Exchange. After moving to Australia he continued in this profession, setting up an office by 1881, becoming a Member of the Melbourne Stock Exchange, and becoming chairman of the Melbourne Stock Exchange by 1890.
