= Montague Shearman =

English judge (1857–1930)

The Right Honourable Sir Montague Shearman
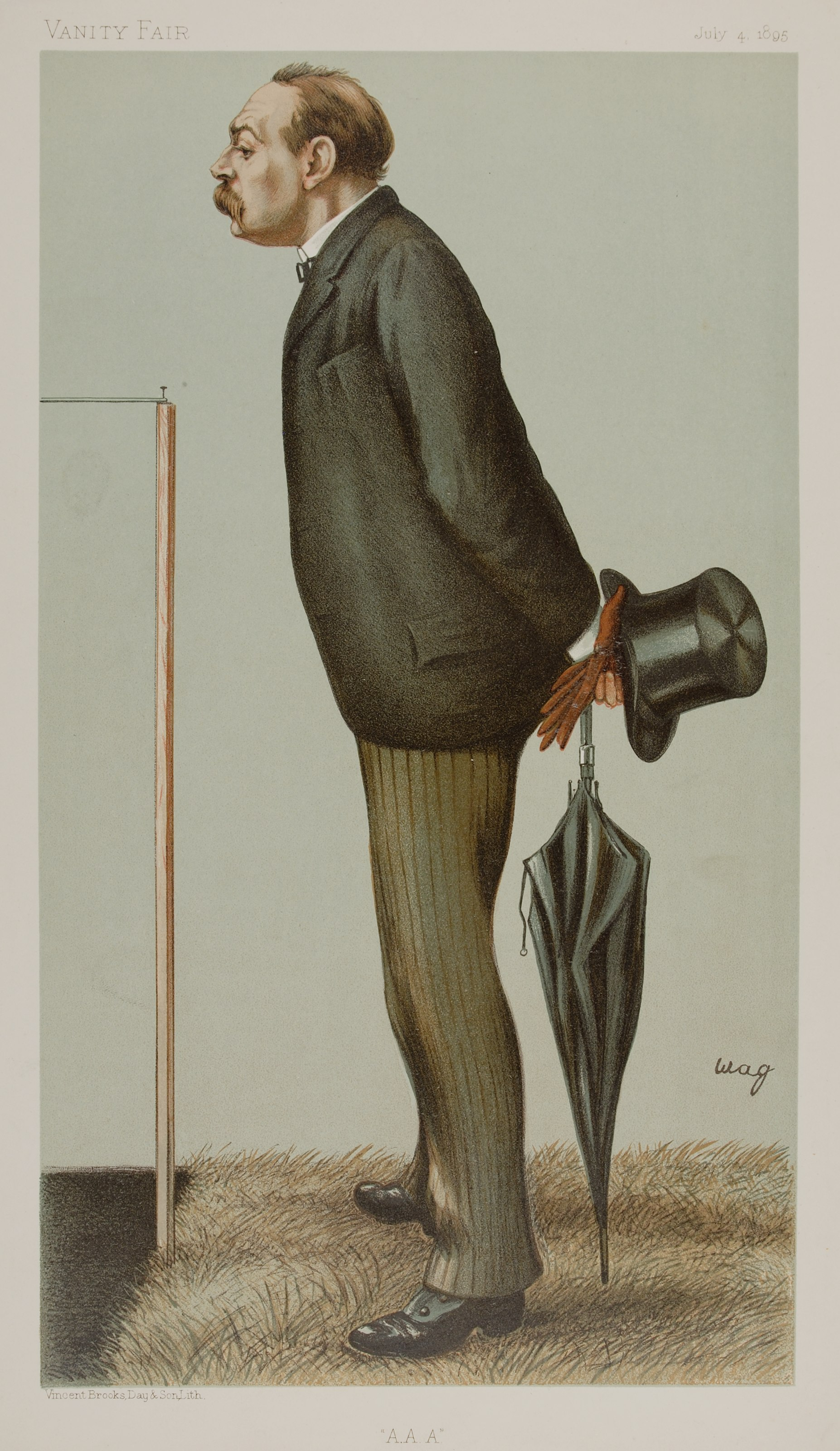
- As caricatured by wag (Arthur George Witherby) in Vanity Fair, July 1895

Justice of the High Court
- In office 1914–1929

Personal details
- Education: Merchant Taylors' School; St John's College, Oxford

Sir Montague Shearman, PC (7 April 1857 – 6 January 1930) was an English judge and athlete. He was a co-founder of the Amateur Athletics Association in 1880.

== Early life ==
Shearman was the second son of Montagu Shearman, a solicitor, from Wimbledon, Surrey and his wife Mary, née Catty. He was educated at Merchant Taylors' School in the City of London, where he played association football, captaining the first XV in 1874–1875. He received a scholarship to St John's College, Oxford, taking a first in Classical Moderations and in Literae Humaniores.

=== Amateur athletics ===
He was a noted athlete, winning the one hundred yards race at the Oxford and Cambridge University Games in 1876, and was president of the Oxford University Athletics Club in 1878. He subsequently became the British 100 yards champion, after winning the AAC Championships title at the 1876 AAC Championships. Montague also became the 440 yards national champion at the 1880 AAA Championships. Montague's brother John Shearman won the quarter-mile championship at the 1878 AAC Championships, defeating Montague into second place.

Montague was also an accomplished rugby player, obtaining his "blue" as a forward and three-quarter in the university team from 1878 – 1880. Shearman was one of the founder members of the association, and served as the first honorary secretary from 1880 to 1883, then as vice-president until 1910. In that year he succeeded Lord Alverstone as president of the AAA. He was also a member of the Wanderers amateur football club.

== Career ==
=== Legal ===
Shearman entered the Inner Temple as a student in 1877, and was called to the bar in 1881. He practised on the Midland Circuit for twenty-two years before "taking silk" to become a king's counsel in February 1903. He was a specialist in common law and commercial cases.

=== Judicial ===
In May 1914, just months before the outbreak of the First World War, Shearman was appointed a judge of the King's Bench Division on the nomination of the Lord Chancellor, Lord Haldane, and was knighted. Along with Lord Hardinge and Sir Mackenzie Chalmers he conducted an official inquiry into the origin and causes of the "Sinn Fein Rebellion" of 1916.

Notable cases at which Shearman presided were the trial of Harold Greenwood at Carmarthen in 1920; of Edith Thompson and Frederick Bywaters; of the murderers of General Henry Wilson at the Central Criminal Court in 1922; and of John Walter Knowles, also in 1922, for the "Tipton Catastrophe", a factory explosion which killed 19 teenaged girls, and which Shearman described as the worst case of manslaughter he had dealt with.

His role in the Thompson-Bywaters trial has been subject to controversy because of the prejudice he showed towards Edith Thompson, who had been charged as a co-conspirator in the murder of her husband by her lover, Freddy Bywaters. In his memoirs journalist and politician, Beverley Baxter, referred to it as only being "in a nightmare that judicial killing was ever countenanced by a supposedly civilised people". He also described the trial as having the atmosphere of "the days of the Roman Empire when the Christians were thrown to the lions". Shearman was unequivocal about his views of the young woman when he told the jurors during his summing up (he would only call them all gentlemen despite there being two women on the jury) what he thought about Thompson's adultery: "I am certain that you, like any other right-minded person, will be filled with disgust at such a notion."

In 1925 Shearman became seriously ill, partly due to an old injury acquired on the football field. Following a medical operation, his speech was impaired, although he returned to work. He retired in October 1929.

== Personal life ==
In 1884 he married Mary Louise Long of New York, and they had two sons. His son, also called Montague Shearman (1885-1940), was a noted art collector, who assembled the Montague Shearman Collection, which contains such famous painters as Picasso, Dalí, Matisse, Utrillo, Sisley, Pissarro, Monet, Renoir, Lautrec, Rowlandson and many others.

The Burlington Magazine noted that the collection focusses on "themes with a clear relationship to comfortable middle-class life .. the satirical element never becoming obtrusive, and in the Lautrec having a distinctly moralising tendency. One wonders whether there was a reason in Shearman's taste for preferring a Renoir landscape to a figure subject - did he dislike Renoir's fleshy and voluptuous types ? - and one's suspicions are strengthened on noticing that the little group of Etty nude-studies are all back-views !"

== Death ==
Shearman died at his London residence, Leigh House, 6 Eaton Gate, in January 1930, aged 72.

== In popular culture ==
In the 1981 Granada Television series Lady Killers, Shearman was played by Hugh Morton in an episode entitled "The Darlingest Boy".

== Books ==
- Shearman, Montague; Vincent, James Edmund (1885). Football: its History for Five Centuries. London: Leadenhall Press.
- Shearman, Montague (1887). Athletics and Football. London: Longmans, Green.. (This book ran to five editions, and according to the Oxford Dictionary of National Biography "stood the test of time for its comprehensiveness and for the quality of its writing")
  - "New edition" (1888)
  - Third edition (1893)
  - Fourth edition (1894)
- Shearman, Montague (1899). Football: History. The Badminton library of sports and pastimes. London: Longmans, Green, and Co. hdl:2027/chi.19338017. (material from Athletics and Football: "issued separately, largely rewritten")
