= AAC Championships =

Annual track and field competition

- Sport: Track and field
- Founded: 1866
- Ceased: 1880
- Country: England/United Kingdom
- Related competitions: AAA Championships

The AAC Championships was an annual track and field competition organised by the Amateur Athletic Club (the de facto governing body for amateur athletics in the United Kingdom). It was the foremost domestic athletics event in the United Kingdom during its lifetime and was the predecessor of the prestigious AAA Championships.

== History ==
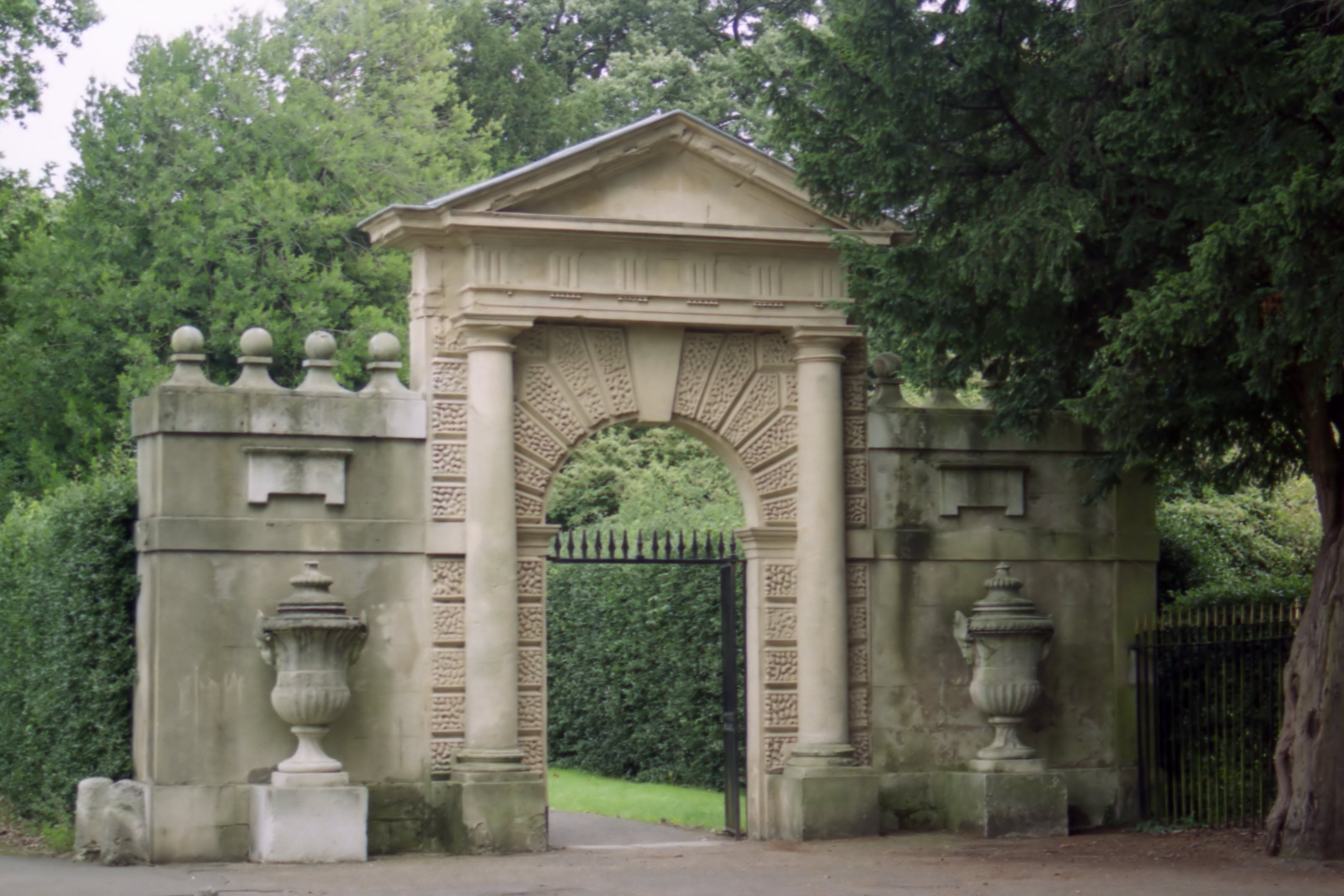
The north gate of Beaufort House, now at Chiswick Park, London

The competition was founded in 1866 as a men-only competition and was held at the club's home base at the Lillie Bridge Grounds in London. By 1879, the championships had arrived at a crossroads because club athletes complained that the staging of the events only suited the University athletes because of the dates chosen to stage the championships. This led to an additional Summer championships in 1879, hosted by the London Athletics Club at the nearby Stamford Bridge Running Grounds. The Northern Athletics Association, whose membership was wider than that of its southern counterparts, threatened to boycott the AAC's annual championships, causing the AAC to collapse and in 1880 the Amateur Athletic Association (AAA) was formed, with rules that ensured any genuine amateur could join irrespective of their occupation or social class.

In 1880, representatives of the Amateur Athletic Club handed over to the new association the challenge cups that had been competed for at their championship for presentation at the new competition. The prizes were presented by Lady Jersey, wife of the Earl of Jersey.

== Past Winners ==
	Year	Date	Venue	Stadium	Notes
1	1866	23 March	London	Beaufort House, Walham Green	
2	1867	15 April	London	Beaufort House, Walham Green	
3	1868	19–20 June	London	Beaufort House, Walham Green	
4	1869	3 April	London	Lillie Bridge Grounds	
5	1870	9 April	London	Lillie Bridge Grounds	
6	1871	3 April	London	Lillie Bridge Grounds	
7	1872	27 March	London	Lillie Bridge Grounds	
8	1873	5 April	London	Lillie Bridge Grounds	
9	1874	30 March	London	Lillie Bridge Grounds	
10	1875	22 March	London	Lillie Bridge Grounds	
11	1876	10 April	London	Lillie Bridge Grounds	
12	1877	26 March	London	Lillie Bridge Grounds	
13	1878	15 April	London	Lillie Bridge Grounds	
14	1879	7 April	London	Lillie Bridge Grounds	Spring championships
15	1879	14/16 June	London	Stamford Bridge Running Grounds	Summer championships

== See also ==
List of British athletics champions
