= London Athletic Club =

British athletics club

LAC
- Ground: Barn Elms Sports Centre
- Location: Queen Elizabeth Walk, London SW13 9SA, England
- Coordinates: 58°28′25″N 0°13′58″W
- Website: official website (facebook)

London Athletic Club (LAC) is a track and field club based in London, England. It is the oldest independent track and field club in the world and celebrated its first 150 years in 2013. More than sixty athletes connected with the club have become Olympians and top athletics administrators in Britain.

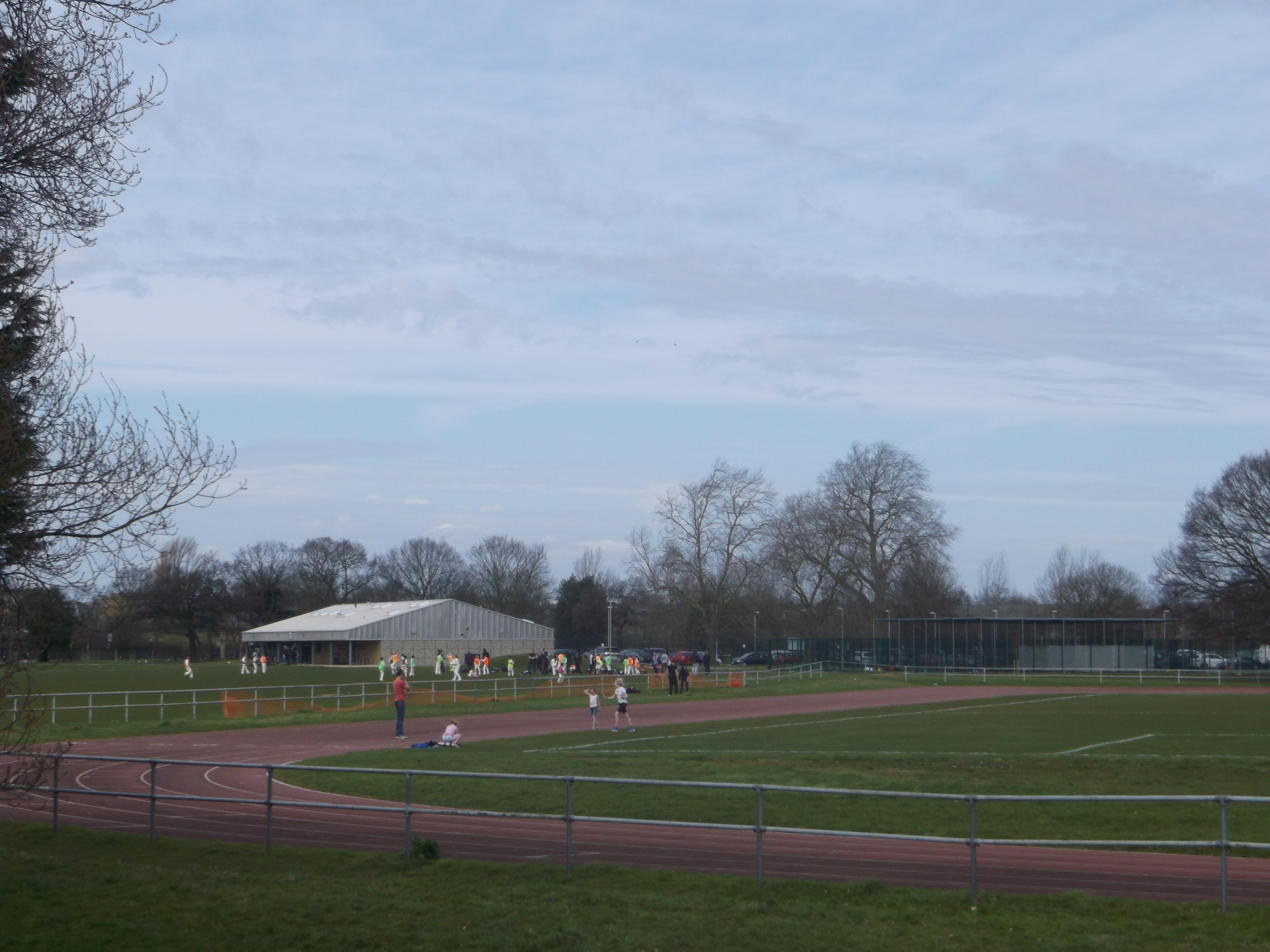
Barns Elms Athletics Track in 2013

== Club colours ==
LAC's colours are Classic Green and Old Gold. The club's kit includes a green vest with a single horizontal gold band. Inside the gold band on the front of the vest is the name of the club or the club's crest.

== History ==
The London Athletic Club, founded in 1863, is the oldest independent track and field club in the world. Initially the club was named Mincing Lane Athletic Club because its members were mainly businessmen in the City of London.

=== Early meetings ===
Its first meeting, on 27 June 1863, was at the (then recently opened) West London Cricket and Running Grounds, Brompton. A later meeting, held on 9 April 1864 at Bow running grounds, was reported in The Sporting Life: "From the attendance….and the excellent sports exhibited, the club promises to become very popular". Meetings were held at various locations across London: another was at the West London running grounds held on 25 November 1865. On 16 January 1866 The Sporting Life reported that the Mincing Lane Athletic Club had been renamed the London Athletic Club, because "gentlemen from all parts of London and most of the principal pedestrians of the day [were] among its members". Three years later, in 1869, the club moved its base to the newly-opened Lillie Bridge Grounds, a few hundred yards north of where Stamford Bridge Stadium is today. Then, in 1870, the brothers James and William Waddell, who had joined LAC as athletes, became treasurer and secretary. Profits soared and in 1877 they secured six and a half acres at Stamford Bridge. The grounds made LAC the premier club of the time. (The brothers fled the country in 1883 and they left the club in debt.)

The early meetings featured events such as cricket ball throwing, bicycle races and, in winter, regular "Assault at Arms" evenings which included fencing and boxing. The LAC even raised a rugby team. Charles Dickens Jr wrote that in 1878 LAC had 700 active and non-active (i.e. non-competing) members; it held 90 competitions with over 1,000 competitors and in that year 268 new members had joined. In 1879 LAC held its own ‘national championships’, since its members had boycotted those of the Amateur Athletic Club based at Lillie Bridge and the forerunner to the governing body of the sport, the Amateur Athletic Association.

In 1897 it was said to be the most important athletic club in London that "takes the lead in almost all matters connected with amateur ... athletics sports."

=== Early association football ===
The club had a football section which early adopted the association football laws. For the most part, the club only hosted matches between its members, but had a handful of games against external opposition between 1867 and 1870. The most notable result for the club was a 3-2 win over the Wanderers in 1868, but this was largely due to a number of L.A.C. players not turning up and some of the Wanderers playing for the opposition to make the sides equal; the posts also did not have the regulation tape and the L.A.C. was credited with one goal that would ordinarily have been considered "over". The club's most notable footballers were F.H. Hartung, who also played for the Clapham Common Club and later joined the Wanderers, and the Chinnery brothers, who also played for the Amateur Athletic Club and the C.C.C.

=== 1870s world records ===
London Athletic Club was the leading track and field club in the 1870s, illustrated by the fact that its members held every track world record between 220 yards to 10 miles during that decade.

Event	Performance	Record holder	Year
220 yd	22.6 s	F T Elborough	1876
440 yd	50.4 s	E J Colbeck	1868
880 yd	1 min 57.5 s	F T Elborough	1876
1 mile	4 min 24.5 s	W Slade	1875
2 mile	9 min 42.0 s	W Slade	1876
3 mile	15 min 8.6 s	J Scott	1871
4 mile	20 min 22 s	W Slade	1875
6 mile	33 min 38 s	W E Fuller	1875
10 mile	56 min 7 s	W E Fuller	1875

Walter Rye, the champion walker of the time, recalled in his autobiography what was arguably the first ever international athletics meeting, when a team from London Athletic Club weathered the Irish Sea to take part in a match in Ireland on 5 June 1876. In 1895 the club sailed to America for a match against New York Athletic club. Another international match took place in 1903 – and was celebrated with a return match in 1985 – at Le Touquet, France. As well as track and field, the events included fencing, tennis, cycling and horse-riding.

=== Stamford Bridge years ===
In 1904 London Athletic Club moved to a new stadium and grounds at Stamford Bridge. The old stand it had used there was demolished and the new construction used spoil from excavating the tube lines of the London Underground in order to level the land. The result was a grandstand overlooking a football field that was surrounded by a quarter mile running track, a banked cycling track and terraces that held six thousand spectators. The inaugural meeting of the London Athletic Club at the new ground was held on 10 May 1905 (Chelsea Football Club used the ground in the winter months and its first match there was on 4 September 1905). The Bridge was to remain LAC's base until 1933.

=== After Stamford Bridge ===
During 1933 the track at Stamford Bridge was converted for use as a greyhound racing track and the club moved its base to White City after being evicted by the Greyhound Racing Association. In 1954 the club moved again to Hurlingham Park stadium, which had been opened by Roger Bannister four months after he had broken the four-minute mile barrier. The club moved its base yet again in 1966 to Crystal Palace, then returned to Hurlingham in 1972 and later used Motspur Park, one of the locations in the film, "Chariots of Fire". LAC President Sir Arthur Gold appeared in the film’s depiction of the memorial service for Harold Abrahams.

=== LAC Schools' meetings ===
The club initiated the idea of a national athletics meeting for English schools. The annual meetings began in the 19th century and until 1948 were restricted to public schools. The first complete London Athletic Club Public Schools’ Meeting was held at Queen's Club, on 10 April 1897. Boys competed at 100, 440, 880 yards, the mile, 120 yards hurdles, high jump and long jump. Later meetings were held at Stamford Bridge until 1933, then mainly at White City until 1962, and then at Motspur Park. Typically over 200 schools would compete each year in the 1940s and 1950s. The schools' meetings would lead to further club competitions against public schools and grammar schools and several of the young athletes who competed would go on to join the club. The LAC Schools’ meetings were transferred to the Independent Schools’ Physical Education Conference in 1973.

=== 100th and 150th Anniversaries ===
The 100th and 150th anniversaries were commemorated at historically significant locations for the club. The 100th anniversary dinner in 1963 was at the Clothworkers Hall, in Mincing Lane in the City of London–significant because the club was founded as Mincing Lane Athletic Club. HRH Prince Philip was guest of honour as President of the British Amateur Athletic Board and the President of the club, the Marquess of Exeter, was in the chair. The 150th anniversary celebration in 2013 was at Stamford Bridge stadium. The President, Richard Solomons, was in the chair and speakers included Lord Puttnam, producer of the Oscar-winning film "Chariots of Fire", who was the guest of honour, the sports historian Philip Barker, and Vice-President, Dr John Disley.

== Club archives ==
The LAC archives reside, with other track and field memorabilia of national importance, in the library of the National Union of Track Statisticians (NUTS) at Orchard Park High School, South Croydon, where they may be viewed by prior appointment with the NUTS librarian.

== Club records ==
Event	Performance	Record holder	Location	Date
100 m	10.3 s	E.R. Sandstrom	Brussels	1957-09-18
200 m	21.1 s	B.A. Smouha	Sofia	1961-09-03
400 m	46.8 s	M.J. Winbolt-Lewis	White City	1966-08-20
800 m	1 min 49.4 s *	J.K. Johnson	Motspur Park	1966-05-21
1500 m	3 min 49.0 s	D.C. Seaman	Stockholm	1953-09-03
1 mile	4 min 05.4 s	J.I. Disley	Walton	1958-06-14
5000 m	14 min 13.2 s	J.I. Disley	White City	1957-07-20
110 m hurdles	14.5 s	V.C. Matthews	Paris	1958-09-14
400 m hurdles	51.5 s	H. Kane	White City	1954-10-13
3000 m s/chase	8 min 44.2 s	J.I. Disley	Moscow	1955-09-11
4×100 m	43.3 s *	N.H. Seale, R.H. Solomons, M.J. Winbolt-Lewis, N. K. Rice	RMA Sandhurst	1966-07-02
4×400 m	3.18.7 s *	E.A.L. Riley, C.P.N. Reilly, J.V. Powell, F.A.R. Hunter	Motspur Park	1934-07-07
High Jump	2.31 m	G.P. Parsons	Victoria, Canada	1994-08-26
Long Jump	7.49 m	J.D. Gangadeen	Bristol	1973-09-02
Triple Jump	14.75 m	J. Mackin	Hurlingham	1973-05-17
Shot	16.83 m	J.A. Savidge	Cardiff	1954-05-08
Discus	54.01 m	E.A. Cleaver	Minden	1962-10-21
Javelin	74.30 m	R.D.W. Miller	Chiswick	1963-07-27
Hammer	59.61 m	P.C. Allday	Bisham Abbey	1956-09-02
Pole Vault	4.14 m	G. Elliott	Paris	1952-08-23
Decathlon	6 638	C.J. Andrews	Welwyn Garden City	1960-07-08/09

 * Times adjusted from 440 yard, 880 yard, 4×110 yard and 4×440 yard respectively.

== Notable athletes ==
=== Olympians ===
Over sixty members of London Athletic Club have competed at the Olympic Games. Australian Teddy Flack won the first Olympic medals for the club: double gold in the 800 and 1500 metres at the first modern Olympics in Athens. The London Olympics of 1908 saw 28 club members representing the UK and Wyndham Halswelle winning gold in the 400 metres by a controversial walkover. Several club members competed at the 1912 Olympics in Stockholm including Sidney Abrahams (Long Jump) and Philip Noel-Baker (800 and 1500 metres), who also captained the British Olympic team at Antwerp in 1920 after World War I. Also running for Britain at the Antwerp Olympics were Robert Lindsay and Guy Butler in the winning 4 x 400 metre relay team. Guy Butler went on to win Olympic medals again in the 1924 Paris Olympics and the Amsterdam Olympics of 1928. Other club members had Olympic success in 1924 and 1928. In the 100 metres in 1924 Harold Abrahams won gold and Arthur Porritt won bronze while in the 800 metres Douglas Lowe won gold. In 1928 Lord Burghley won gold in the 400 metre hurdles and Douglas Lowe took the gold medal in the 800 metres. Pre–World War II Olympic success continued with Frederick Wolff leading Britain’s 4 x 400 metres relay team to gold in Berlin in 1936.

After World War II, at the 1948 London Olympics, Michael Pope competed in the 400 metre hurdles. Four years later, John Disley won bronze in the 3000 metre steeplechase in Helsinki in 1952 and later became synonymous with the London Marathon. Javelin thrower Dick Miller from Northern Ireland and hurdler Jack Parker also represented Great Britain at the 1952 summer olympics. Jack Parker competed in the 1956 Summer Olympics in Melbourne in the 110 metres hurdles. The high-jumper Geoff Parsons, who competed in the 1984 and 1988 Olympic Games, reached the final in 1988.

Athlete	Games	Medals
Teddy Flack	1896	Gold medal Gold medal Bronze medal
Ernest Ion Pool	1900	
(United States) Wesley Coe	1904	
James Cormack	1906	
Reginald Crabbe	1906	
Wyndham Halswelle	1906, 1908	Gold medal Silver medal Bronze medal
Henry Hawtrey	1906	Gold medal
Kristian Hellström	1906, 1910	Bronze medal
John Horne	1906	
Reginald Reed	1906	
Walter Henderson	1908, 1912	
Frederick Kitching	1908	
William Knyvett	1908	
Edward Leader	1908	
Henry Leeke	1908	
Ernest May	1908	
Lionel Reed	1908	
Sydney Sarel	1908	
Lancelot Stafford	1908	
Harry Watson	1908	
Richard Yorke	1908, 1912	
Sidney Abrahams	1912	
Arthur Anderson	1912	
Philip Noel-Baker	1912, 1920	Silver medal
Henry Blakeney	1912	
Philip Kingsford	1912	
William Stewart	1912	
Denis Black	1920	
Harold Abrahams	1924	Gold medal Silver medal
David, Lord Burghley	1924, 1928, 1932	Gold medal Silver medal
Guy Butler	1924	
Robert Lindsay	1924	
Douglas Lowe	1924, 1928	Gold medal Gold medal
Arthur Porritt	1924	Bronze medal
Vernon Morgan	1928	
Douglas Neame	1928	
Roly Harper	1932	
Jack Powell	1932, 1936	
Brian MacCabe	1936	
Jack Newman	1936	
Freddie Wolff	1936	Gold medal
Malcolm Dalrymple	1948	
Alastair McCorquodale	1948	Silver medal
Michael Pope	1948	
Peter Allday	1952, 1956	
John Disley	1952, 1956	Bronze medal
June Foulds-Paul	1952, 1956	Silver medal Bronze medal
Dick Miller	1952	
Rafiu Oluwa	1952, 1956	
Lavy Pinto	1952	
John Savidge	1952	
Peter Wells	1952, 1956	
Paul Engo	1956	
Harry Kane	1956	
Mike Wheeler	1956	
Vic Matthews	1960	
Geoff Parsons	1984, 1988	
