= Amateur Athletic Club =

UK Athletics organisation

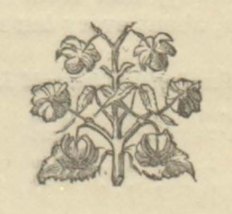
- Abbreviation: AAC
- Successor: Amateur Athletic Association
- Formation: 20 January 1866; 160 years ago
- Dissolved: 1879
- Type: Amateur Sports Organization
- Headquarters: Lillie Bridge
- Chairman: Major Frederick Hammersley

== History ==
The Amateur Athletic Club or AAC was the predecessor of the Amateur Athletic Association (later renamed the Amateur Athletic Association of England) and from 1866 to 1879 was the de facto governing body for amateur athletics in the United Kingdom. The club was formed at the beginning of 1866 by some old University and London athletes. In the prospectus it was announced that the club was formed to 'supply a want which existed of some established ground on which competitions in amateur athletic sports might take place, and to afford as completely as possible to all classes of gentlemen amateurs the means of practising and competing against one another, without being compelled to mix with professional runners.' The newly formed club determined to institute an Annual Open Athletics Championship and the first of these known as the AAC Championships took place on 23 March 1866 at Beaufort House, Walham Green, a venue already known for hosting athletics, such as the 1865 Civil Service Athletics competition.

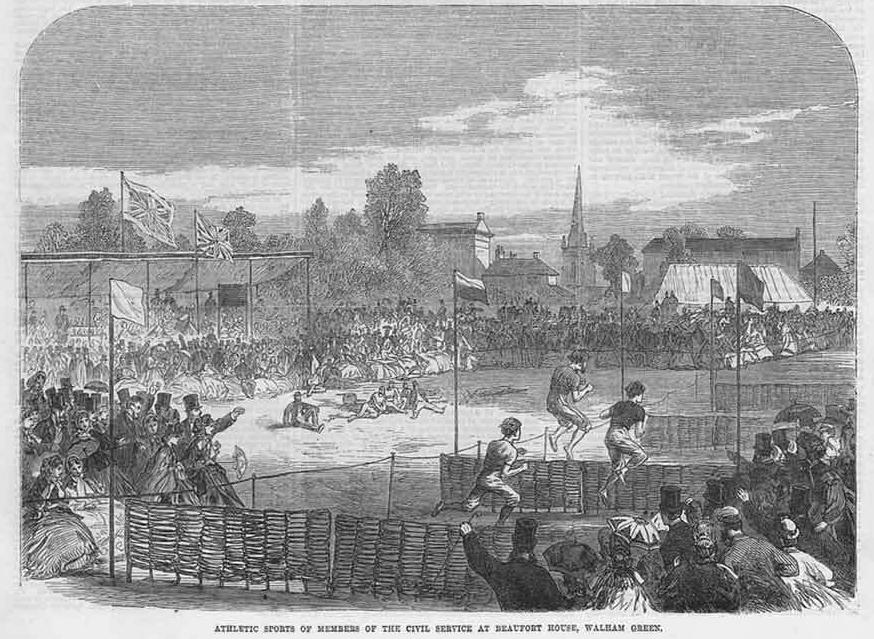
The 1865 Civil Service Athletics at Beaufort House, Walham Green - the site of the 1866 AAC championships.

Contemporary sources reported that the event was a success and one of the founders of the AAA later recalled this. Montague Shearman later wrote that he believed the intention of the founders of the Amateur Athletic Club was to place their club in the same position with athletes as the M.C.C. stood to cricketers. To this end, the AAC began well and by 1868 the club had opened a very well received running ground for amateurs at Lillie Bridge, which became the headquarters.

It has been argued that the cause of the demise of The Amateur Athletic Club was drafted into its original constitution. There was an assumption that those who engaged in manual labour might have a competitive edge. As such, what has been termed a 'mechanics clause' was introduced that effectively prevented anyone in manual labour from joining. This caused debate and unease from the beginning and by 1879, the Northern Athletics Association, whose membership was wider than that of its southern counterparts, threatened to boycott the AAC's annual championships. This caused the AAC to collapse and in 1880 the Amateur Athletic Association was formed, with rules that ensured any genuine amateur could join irrespective of their occupation or social class.

== Football club ==
Football club
- Full name: Amateur Athletic Club
- Nicknames: A.A.C., The Amateurs
- Founded: 1866
- Dissolved: 1876
- Ground: Lillie Bridge
Home colours

The club included a football club which was a member of the Football Association from 1868 to 1876 and which played its first match against external opposition in November 1866. It entered the FA Cup in 1873–74 but scratched when drawn to play Clapham Rovers because of an inability to get a team together.

Despite the club claiming a membership of over 350 in 1873, there is no record of it having played a match against external opposition after November 1868, suggesting the football side was mainly aimed at matches within the membership. There is no record of the club ever having won a match against external opposition; the club's best result was a 0–0 draw against the Royal Engineers A.F.C. in February 1868, thanks in part to the presence of Edgar Lubbock and Charles W. Alcock in the side.

=== Colours ===
The club's colours were all white with cerise trimmings.

=== Grounds ===
Home matches were originally played at Beaufort House but by 1872 the club was based at Lillie Bridge.

=== Notable players ===
- E.E. Bowen, Thomas Hooman, and W.J. Dixon of Crusaders played for the club in 1867.

== See also ==
- Amateur Athletic Association
- Amateur Athletic Union
