= Amateur Athletic Association of England =

Athletic Association in England

- Abbreviation: AAA
- Predecessor: Amateur Athletic Club
- Formation: 24 April 1880; 146 years ago
- Founders: Clement Jackson, Montague Shearman and Bernhard Wise
- Type: Amateur Sports Organization
- Headquarters: Wincham, Cheshire
- Chairman: Walter Nicholls

The Amateur Athletic Association of England or AAA (pronounced 'three As') is the oldest national governing body for athletics in the world, having been established on 24 April 1880. Historically it effectively oversaw athletics throughout Britain (until 2005) and Ireland (until 1923). Its role changed to support regional athletic clubs within England alone. This role was effectively taken over by England Athletics in 2005 and the Amateur Athletic Association of England was absorbed into that organisation. It is now concerned with the development of young athletes and has taken on the role of safeguarding the history of the sport and still awards trophies to elite athletes.

The championships of the Association were effectively the British national championships in the sport until the creation of the first iteration of the UK Athletics Championships by the new national federation. Even with this challenge, the AAA events continued to be held, and broadly recognised by athletes and media as national championships, and often more prestigious than the events organised by the governing federation itself until 1999, and the founding of the successor to the defunct British Athletics Federation (BAF), UK Athletics (UKA). By 2007, the new federation's championships had achieved primacy as the AAA evolved to more community ends.

== History ==
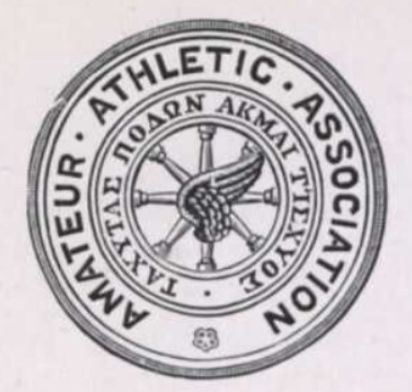
Original logo of the Amateur Athletic Association

Three men from Oxford University, Clement Jackson, Montague Shearman and Bernhard Wise, were responsible for the founding of the Amateur Athletic Association which succeeded the Amateur Athletic Club ("AAC") in 1880. The Amateur Athletic Club had had a narrow definition of 'amateur' and had drafted into its original constitution what has been termed a 'mechanics clause' that effectively prevented anyone engaged in manual labour from joining on the assumption that those who engaged in such physical work might have a competitive edge. This caused debate and unease from the beginning and by 1879, the Northern Athletics Association, whose membership was wider than that of its southern counterparts, threatened to boycott the AAC's annual championships. This caused the AAC to collapse and in 1880 the Amateur Athletic Association was formed, with rules that ensured any genuine amateur could join irrespective of their occupation or social class. The AAA's original motto was in Ancient Greek and read 'ΤΑΧΥΤΛΣ ΠΟΔΩΝ ΑΚΜΑΙ ΤΊΣΧΥΟΣ' which translates to 'Fast Feet and Strength'. The first AAA Championships were held on the 3 July 1880 at Lillie Bridge. Dame Marea Hartman was the first woman president of the AAA when she was appointed in 1991. The AAA of England was formed in 1991 following the merger of the previous AAA and the Women's Amateur Athletic Association (formed in 1922). The WAAA held the first WAAA Championships in 1923. It is now headquartered in Wincham in Cheshire West and Chester, towards the east of Northwich.

The AAA Championships (widely regarded as the de facto British national championships) were held annually from 3 July 1880 up to 2006 (with breaks for the two world wars). Trials events for the British teams for the Olympics, World Championships in Athletics, European Athletics Championships and Commonwealth Games were often included as part of the competitions. The AAA Indoor Championships served a similar role from its creation in 1935. The creation in 1999 of a new national governing body for athletics, UK Athletics, signaled the waning influence of the AAA and its championships, with the new body running its own British Athletics Championships and trials events indoors and outdoors from 2007 onwards.

== Archives ==
Archives of the Amateur Athletic Association of England are held at the Cadbury Research Library, University of Birmingham. Archives of the Women's Amateur Athletic Association are also held at the Cadbury Research Library, University of Birmingham.

== See also ==
- England Athletics - the parent organisation since 2005
- Amateur Athletic Union, American equivalent
- Irish Amateur Athletic Association Irish offshoot, later to merge into the Athletics Ireland
