= Lillie Bridge Grounds =

Football stadium

Coordinates: 51.4854°N 0.1943°W

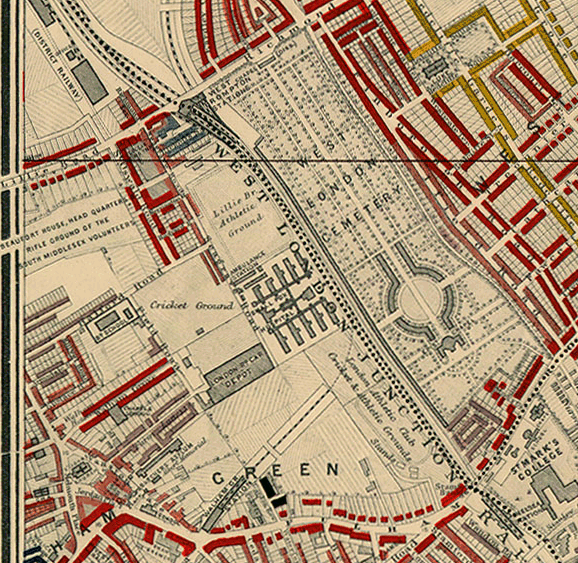
Location of the Lillie Bridge Athletic Ground, adjacent to the railway line close to West Brompton station. (Click to enlarge). The then newly opened Stamford Bridge can be seen a little to the south ("London Athletics Club"). Detail from Charles Booth's 1889 descriptive map of London.

The Lillie Bridge Grounds was a sports ground on the Fulham side of West Brompton, London. It opened in 1866, coinciding with the opening of West Brompton station. It was named after the local landowner, Sir John Scott Lillie (1790–1868) and the Lillie bridge over the West London Line, that links Old Brompton Road with Lillie Road. The grounds were adjacent to the railway on the south side of Lillie Road. Although geographically near to present day Stamford Bridge, there was never direct access, there being the 13-acre now defunct Western Hospital site between the two. The ground was the scene in its day of many sports including athletics, boxing, cricket, cycling and football, and hosted the FA Cup Final in 1873. It closed in 1888 following a riot reported in The Times.

== History ==
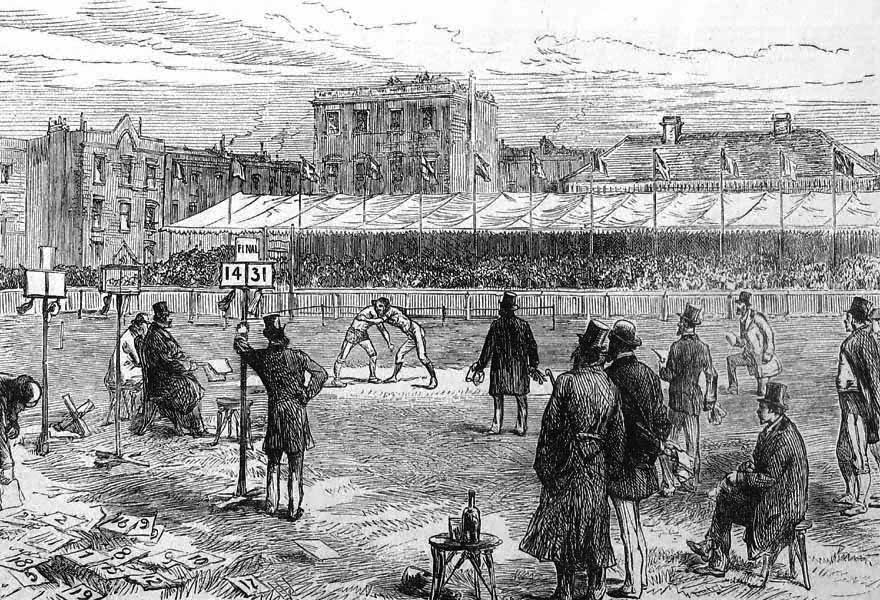
Lillie Grounds

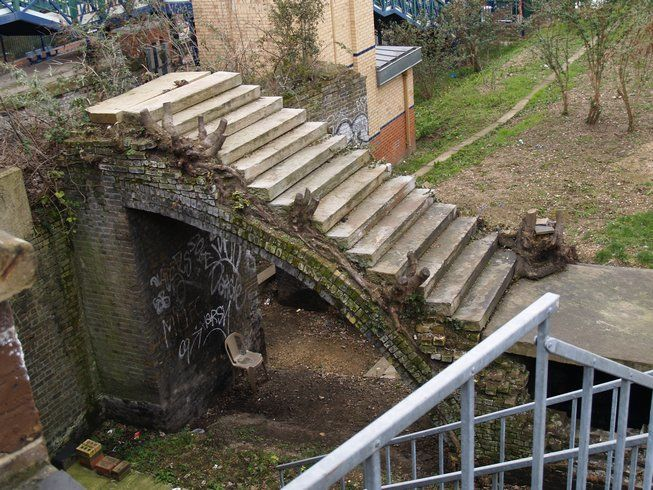
steps to the old canal basin to the North of Lillie Grounds

The London Athletic Club, founded in 1866, moved to the Grounds in 1869 where it stayed until 1876, prior to its transfer to Stamford Bridge. Meanwhile, the venue began hosting other sports including: bicycle racing, football, cricket and wrestling. There were also hot air balloon festivals and county fairs. It fell into disuse after a riot on 18 September 1888 following the cancellation of an athletics meeting at which 6,000 to 7,000 people had paid to watch and placed their bets. The ensuing riot destroyed the track and grandstand, leading to closure the following year. This coincided with the development on the north side of Lillie Bridge, of John Robinson Whitley's 1887 Earl's Court Exhibition Grounds. This was transformed in 1937 into the internationally famous venue, which hosted the indoor Volleyball competition of the 2012 Olympics before itself being consigned to demolition.

=== Athletics ===
Lillie Bridge was the home of the Amateur Athletic Club whose moving spirit was the Cambridge University athlete, John Graham Chambers and who helped to organise the Amateur Championships before they were held under the auspices of the Amateur Athletic Association. From 1867 to 1887, the annual athletics Varsity match between Oxford and Cambridge Universities were held here before moving to Queen's Club on the ground's closure. Many World Records were set at Lillie Bridge, including for example, 6' 2.5" in the high jump in 1876 by Marshall Brooks in front of a crowd of 12,000.

=== Boxing ===
The person to codify the Marquess of Queensberry Rules was John Graham Chambers. The ground held the first ever amateur boxing matches in 1867, cups being supplied by the Marquess of Queensberry.

=== Football ===
The Wanderers, after winning the first FA Cup final in 1872, were allowed to defend the cup in the second final of 1873 with choice of venue. Not having a ground of their own, they chose Lillie Bridge and Oxford University were defeated 2–0. The attendance was over 1,000 higher than the previous final.

Results of FA Cup Finals at Lillie Bridge

| Year | Attendance | Winner | | Runner-up | |
|---|---|---|---|---|---|
| 1873 | 3,000 | Wanderers | 2 | Oxford University | 0 |

=== Cricket ===
Middlesex County Cricket Club moved to Lillie Bridge in 1869. WG Grace scored several centuries here before the MCCC left in 1872 to find better quality turf at Lord's. The club nearly folded at this time, a vote for continuing being won 7–6.

== The grounds today ==
The LNWR opened its Brompton and Fulham Goods and Coal Station on the site in 1892. This was closed in the 1960s and the site was used for many years as a car park serving the Earls Court Exhibition Centre. From 2012 to 2017 the site was being redeveloped as part of the Lillie Square housing scheme.

| Preceded by The Oval; London | FA Cup; Final Venue; 1873 | Succeeded by The Oval; London |
