= Deaths in February 1994 =

The following is a list of notable deaths in February 1994.

Entries for each day are listed alphabetically by surname. A typical entry lists information in the following sequence:

- Name, age, country of citizenship at birth, subsequent country of citizenship (if applicable), reason for notability, cause of death (if known), and reference.

== February 1994 ==
=== 1 ===
- Sergei Dubov, 50, Russian journalist, publisher and entrepreneur, homicide.
- Lars Eriksson, 67, Swedish footballer and Olympian (1952).
- Ray Ferris, 73, Northern Irish football player.
- Guy Lefranc, 74, French director and screenwriter.
- John Littlejohn, 62, American electric blues guitarist, kidney failure.
- Jo Richardson, 70, British Labour Party politician.
- Radovan Samardžić, 71, Yugoslav/Serbian historian and academic.
- Olan Soule, 84, American actor, lung cancer.

=== 2 ===
- Steve Barclay, 75, American film actor.
- Jim Bedard, 66, Canadian ice hockey player (Chicago Black Hawks).
- Jean Couturier, 82, French Olympic basketball player (1936).
- Marija Gimbutas, 73, Lithuanian archaeologist and anthropologist.
- Zaim Imamović, 73, Bosnian folk singer, accordionist and author.
- Otto Kippes, 88, German Catholic priest.
- Yōichi Nakanishi, 76, Japanese politician and Governor of Ishikawa Prefecture.
- John Rewald, 81, American academic, author and art historian.
- Willie Mae Ford Smith, 89, American gospel musician and Christian evangelist.
- Jack Streader, 66, Australian rules footballer.
- Mary Washburn, 86, American Olympic sprinter (1928).
- Anona Winn, 90, Australian-British actress, broadcaster and singer.

=== 3 ===
- Anatoly Petrovich Alexandrov, 90, Soviet and Russian physicist and academic.
- Roberto Amoroso, 83, Italian screenwriter and film producer.
- Rauf Atakishiyev, 68, Soviet and Azerbaijani singer and pianist.
- Carroll Borland, 79, American professor, writer, and actress, pneumonia.
- Herbert Busemann, 88, German-American mathematician.
- Frederick Copleston, 86, English Roman Catholic Jesuit priest, philosopher, and historian.
- Justinus Darmojuwono, 79, Indonesian Roman Catholic cardinal.
- Walter Havighurst, 92, American novelist, critic, and literary and social historian.
- Alan Helffrich, 93, American athlete and Olympic champion (1924).
- Ellen King, 85, Scottish swimmer and Olympian (1924, 1928).
- Patrick El Mabrouk, 65, French Olympic middle-distance runner (1952).
- Raúl Padilla, 75, Mexican actor (El Chavo del Ocho, El Chanfle 2), heart attack.
- Glenn Wade Salisbury, 83, American agriculture biologist.
- Georgy Shchedrovitsky, 64, Soviet and Russian philosopher and methodologist.
- Dale Warren, 54, American musician.

=== 4 ===
- Jane Arbor, 90, British writer.
- Fred De Bruyne, 63, Belgian road cyclist.
- Brunetto Bucciarelli Ducci, 79, Italian politician and magistrate.
- Bedri Gürsoy, 92, Turkish football player.
- Mikhail Linge, 35, Soviet Russian Olympic middle-distance runner (1980), murdered.
- Thelma Stovall, 74, American politician.

=== 5 ===
- Hermann Josef Abs, 92, German banker and advisor to Chancellor Konrad Adenauer.
- Ben Enwonwu, 72, Nigerian painter and sculptor.
- Joachim Halupczok, 25, Polish racing cyclist and Olympian (1988), heart failure.
- Tiana Lemnitz, 96, German operatic soprano.
- George Sauer, 83, American football player (Green Bay Packers), coach, and football executive (New York Titans, Boston Patriots).
- James F. Walker, 80, American graphic artist.

=== 6 ===
- Bill Chamberlain, 84, American baseball player (Chicago White Sox).
- Joseph Cotten, 88, American actor (Citizen Kane, Shadow of a Doubt, The Third Man), pneumonia.
- Norman Del Mar, 74, British conductor, horn player, and biographer.
- Felice Gremo, 92, Italian racing cyclist.
- Ross Grimsley, 71, American Major League Baseball player (Chicago White Sox).
- Jack Kirby, 76, American comic book artist and writer (Fantastic Four, Captain America, X-Men), heart failure.
- Aurora Mardiganian, 93, Armenian-American author and actress.
- Hilda Simms, 75, American stage actress, pancreatic cancer.
- Ignace Strasfogel, 84, Polish pianist, composer and conductor, Alzheimer's disease.
- Luis Alberto Sánchez, 93, Peruvian jurist, philosopher, writer and politician.
- Gwen Watford, 66, English actress, cancer.
- Frank Whitman, 69, American baseball player (Chicago White Sox).

=== 7 ===
- Richard M. Bissell, Jr., 84, American CIA officer.
- Billy Briscoe, 97, English football player.
- Laurence Brown, 86, English Anglican clergyman.
- Jorge Brum do Canto, 83, Portuguese film director and actor.
- Witold Lutosławski, 81, Polish composer and conductor.
- Bill McDonald, 77, American basketball player.
- Stephen Milligan, 45, British politician and journalist, erotic asphyxiation.
- Marcel Miquel, 80, French footballer.
- Charles Richardson, 85, British Army officer.
- Arnold Smith, 79, Canadian diplomat.
- Maarten Vrolijk, 74, Dutch socialist politician.

=== 8 ===
- Saul Davis, 92, American baseball player.
- Pierrette Glotin, 60 French Olympic long jumper (1952).
- Ken G. Hall, 92, Australian film producer and director.
- Jack Lugg, 74, Australian rules footballer.
- Amparo Ochoa, 47, Mexican singer-songwriter.
- Bob Reynolds, 79, American gridiron football player (Detroit Lions).
- Raymond Scott, 85, American musician, record producer, and inventor of electronic instruments.

=== 9 ===
- Raymond A. Hare, 92, American diplomat and ambassador.
- Louis Kaufman, 88, American violinist.
- Ray Lamanno, 74, American baseball player (Cincinnati Reds).
- Gherasim Luca, 80, Romanian surrealist theorist and poet, suicide.
- Norman Mann, 79, English-born Canadian ice hockey player (Toronto Maple Leafs).
- Joe Mowry, 85, American baseball player (Boston Braves).
- Jarmila Novotná, 86, Czechoslovak and Chech soprano and actress.
- Sam Parrilla, 50, American baseball player (Philadelphia Phillies).
- Tom Pettersen, 58, Norwegian Olympic swimmer (1952).
- Howard Temin, 59, American geneticist and virologist, lung cancer.
- Bud Wilkinson, 77, American football player, coach, broadcaster, and politician.

=== 10 ===
- Mel Calman, 62, British cartoonist, thrombosis.
- Robert Crépeaux, 93, French chess master.
- Fritz John, 83, German-American mathematician.
- Bernard Lucas, 86, British Olympic hurdler (1928).
- Dominic McGlinchey, 39–40, Irish republican paramilitary leader, shot.
- Antonio Oré, 79, Peruvian Olympic basketball player (1936).
- Laurie Tetley, 72, Australian rules footballer.
- Augusts Voss, 77, Soviet and Latvian politician.

=== 11 ===
- Robert Bobin, 73, French Olympic triple jumper (1948).
- Neil Bonnett, 47, American racing driver, racing accident.
- Sorrell Booke, 64, American actor (The Dukes of Hazzard, Fail-Safe, Freaky Friday), colorectal cancer.
- William Conrad, 73, American actor (Jake and the Fatman, Cannon, The Killers), heart failure.
- Joseph Cordeiro, 76, Pakistani Catholic priest.
- Paul Feyerabend, 70, Austrian philosopher of science, brain cancer.
- Osrik Forsberg, 81, Finnish Olympic rower (1948).
- Aredio Gimona, 70, Italian footballer and Olympian (1952).
- Mercè Comaposada i Guillén, 92, Spanish pedagogue, lawyer, and anarcha-feminist.
- Sune Mangs, 61, Swedish actor.
- Ryszard Mańko, 47, Polish footballer.
- Antonio Martín, 23, Spanish road bicycle racer, bicycle accident.
- Irénée Pelletier, 54, Canadian politician, member of the House of Commons of Canada (1972-1984).
- Saul Weprin, 66, American attorney and politician, stroke.
- Vincent Wigglesworth, 94, British entomologist.

=== 12 ===
- Charles Critchfield, 83, American mathematical physicist.
- Ray Dandridge, 80, American Negro league baseball player.
- Ivor Darreg, 76, American composer of xenharmonic music.
- Rafael Durán, 82, Spanish actor.
- Bill Ewing, 84, Australian rules footballer.
- Rahela Ferari, 82, Yugoslavian and Serbian actress.
- Jimmy Franks, 79, Canadian ice hockey player (Detroit Red Wings, New York Rangers, Boston Bruins).
- Donald Judd, 65, American minimalist artist, lymphoma.
- Sir Richard Luyt, 78, South African Governor of British Guiana.
- Sue Rodriguez, 43, Canadian right-to-die activist, ALS.
- Karl Wirtz, 83, German nuclear physicist.

=== 13 ===
- James Aitchison, 73, Scottish cricketer.
- Michael Lindsay, 2nd Baron Lindsay of Birker, 84, British peer and academic.
- Robert Bloom, 85, American oboist, composer and arranger.
- Roy Winfield Harper, 88, American district judge.
- Walter Judd, 95, American politician and physician, member of the United States House of Representatives (1943-1963).
- Les McCann, 73, Australian rules footballer.
- Mostafa Salimi, 90, Iranian football player and manager.
- Robert Sherrod, 85, American journalist, editor and writer, pulmonary emphysema.

=== 14 ===
- Pietro Belluschi, 94, Italian-American architect.
- Andrei Chikatilo, 57, Soviet serial killer, execution by shooting.
- Ivan Chodák, 80, Slovak football player and coach.
- Jean Goldschmit, 69, Luxembourgish road bicycle racer.
- Tiger Haynes, 79, American actor and film and jazz musician.
- Margaret Lane, 87, British journalist, biographer and novelist.
- Christopher Lasch, 61, American historian, moralist and social critic, leukemia.
- Rodney Orr, 31, American racing driver.
- Henry Milton Taylor, 90, Governor-general of the Bahamas.

=== 15 ===
- Ray Blemker, 56, American baseball player (Kansas City Athletics).
- Doc Bracken, 78, American baseball player.
- Lewis Brand, 68, Canadian politician, member of the House of Commons of Canada (1965-1968).
- Richard Emory, 75, American actor, stroke.
- Elliott Jones, 86, American Olympic sports shooter (1936).
- Frank Kitto, 90, Australian lawyer and judge.
- Gennady Modoy, 70, Soviet Russian Olympic middle-distance runner (1952).
- Liu Ningyi, 86, Chinese politician.
- Halfdan Petterøe, 88, Norwegian Olympic equestrian (1936).
- Andrea Heinemann Simon, 84, American civil rights activist and mother of singer Carly Simon, lung cancer.
- Bob Skarda, 68, American basketball player.

=== 16 ===
- Wolfgang Erndl, 72, Austrian Olympic sailor (1952, 1956).
- Noël Foré, 61, Belgian road bicycle racer.
- François Marty, 89, French Catholic Cardinal and Archbishop of Paris, railway accident.
- Richard O'Kane, 83, American Navy submarine commander during World War II, Medal of Honor recipient.
- Bob C. Riley, 69, American educator and politician.
- Ann Wigmore, 84, Lithuanian-American holistic health practitioner and naturopath.

=== 17 ===
- Neville Broderick, 66, Australian rules football player.
- Aleksandr Chakovsky, 80, Soviet/Russian editor and novelist.
- Gretchen Fraser, 75, American alpine ski racer and Olympian (1948).
- Rosario García Ortega, 82, Argentine actress.
- Chimanbhai Patel, 64, Indian politician.
- Scott Elgin Reed, 72, American district judge (United States District Court for the Eastern District of Kentucky).
- Randy Shilts, 42, American journalist and author, AIDS-related complications.
- Vilmos Varjú, 56, Hungarian shot putter and Olympian (1964, 1968, 1972).
- Frederick Weber, 88, American Olympic athlete (1936).

=== 18 ===
- Annemarie Ackermann, 80, German politician and member of the Bundestag.
- Ruth Adler, 49, British feminist and human rights campaigner.
- Bill Clemensen, 74, American baseball player (Pittsburgh Pirates).
- Michel Duran, 93, French actor, author, and screenwriter.
- John Edwards, 18, American murder victim.
- Jake Gaither, 90, American gridiron football coach (Florida A&M Rattlers).
- Gopi Krishna, 58, Indian dancer, actor and choreographer, heart attack.
- Beltrán Alfonso Osorio, 75, Spanish peer and jockey.
- Robert H. Park, 91, American electrical engineer and inventor.
- Ameer Hamza Shinwari, 87, Afghan Pashto-language poet.
- John Tedder, 2nd Baron Tedder, 67, British noble and chemist.
- Ralph W. Tyler, 91, American educator.
- Barbara Willard, 84, British novelist.

=== 19 ===
- Hubert Hammerschmied, 79, Austrian Olympic skier (1948).
- Johnny Hancocks, 74, English football player and manager.
- Derek Jarman, 52, English film director (Caravaggio, Sebastiane, Edward II), author and gay rights activist, AIDS-related complications.
- Patrick O'Reilly, 66, Irish politician.
- Fyodor Odinokov, 81, Soviet and Russian actor.
- Vittorio Rieti, 96, Italian-American composer.
- Ivan Sidorenko, 74, Soviet sniper during World War II and Hero of the Soviet Union.
- Yitzhak Yitzhaky, 57, Israeli educator and politician.

=== 20 ===
- Vladimir Druzhnikov, 71, Soviet actor.
- Marino Girolami, 80, Italian film director and actor.
- Rolf Jacobsen, 86, Norwegian author.
- Eric McKay, 94, Canadian politician, member of the House of Commons of Canada (1945-1949).
- Víctor Parra, 74, Mexican actor and producer.

=== 21 ===
- Gerda Alexander, 86, German-Danish teacher and psychologist.
- Evgeny Belyaev, 67, Russian tenor.
- Oscar Collazo, 80, Puerto Rican militant.
- Homa Darabi, 54, Iranian pediatrician, academic and political activist, suicide.
- Jacob Gjerding, 64, Danish Olympic diver (1952).
- Fred Larson, Canadian politician, member of the House of Commons of Canada (1949-1953).
- Mary Lasker, 93, American health activist and philanthropist.
- Douglas Neil, 70, Canadian lawyer and politician, member of the House of Commons of Canada (1973-1984).
- Johannes Steinhoff, 80, German Luftwaffe fighter ace during World War II, and NATO official.

=== 22 ===
- Papa John Creach, 76, American blues violinist.
- Hans Hürlimann, 75, Swiss politician.
- Lore Lorentz, 73, German kabarett artist and standup comedian, pneumonia.
- János Pap, 68, Hungarian communist politician, suicide.
- Pete Preboske, 80, American basketball player.
- T. Chalapathi Rao, 73, Indian film music director.
- Barry Warren, 60, British actor.
- Dan Zakhem, 35, Israeli performance artist, AIDS-related brain cancer.

=== 23 ===
- Marvin Burke, 75, American NASCAR racecar driver.
- Odd Højdahl, 73, Norwegian politician.
- Arthur Piantadosi, 77, American sound engineer (All the President's Men, Tootsie, Altered States), Oscar winner (1977).
- Jackie Power, 77, Irish hurler and gaelic football player.
- Manfredo Tafuri, 58, Italian architect, historian, critic and academic, heart attack.

=== 24 ===
- Alighiero Boetti, 53, Italian conceptual artist.
- Maude Bonney, 96, South African-Australian aviator.
- Ulrich Gabler, 80, German U-boat chief engineer during World War II .
- Robert Gronowski, 67, Polish football player and manager.
- Klaas de Groot, 74, Dutch Olympic wrestler (1948).
- Ion Lăpușneanu, 85, Romanian football goalkeeper.
- Jim McKnight, 57, American baseball player (Chicago Cubs).
- Ladislav Mňačko, 75, Slovak writer and journalist.
- Jean Sablon, 87, French singer, songwriter, composer and actor.
- Dinah Shore, 77, American singer, actress, and television personality, ovarian cancer.
- Hugh Tayfield, 65, South African cricket player.

=== 25 ===
- Noel Alsop, 79, Australian rules footballer.
- Marvin J. Ashton, 78, American politician, writer, and apostle of the LDS Church.
- Russell Bufalino, 90, Italian-American mobster, heart attack.
- Givi Chokheli, 56, Georgian football player.
- Baruch Goldstein, 37, American-Israeli mass murderer and religious extremist, beaten to death.
- Hamoud bin Abdulaziz Al Saud, 47, Saudi royal and businessman.
- Jersey Joe Walcott, 80, American boxer.

=== 26 ===
- Else Ahlmann-Ohlsen, 86, Danish Olympic fencer (1928).
- Tarık Buğra, 75, Turkish journalist, novelist and short story author.
- J. L. Carr, 81, English novelist, publisher, and eccentric.
- Sofka Dolgorouky, 86, Russian-British princess, writer and communist.
- Avery Fisher, 87, Amateur violinist and philanthropist.
- Bill Hicks, 32, American stand-up comedian, satirist, and musician, pancreatic cancer.
- Leopold Kohr, 84, Austrian-American economist, jurist and political scientist.
- Jack Oatey, 73, Australian rules football player and coach.

=== 27 ===
- Sir Harold Acton, 89, British writer, scholar, and aesthete.
- Layton Fergusson, 85, Canadian politician.
- Charlie Kolb, 86, Australian rules footballer.
- Arnold Townsend, 81, English cricket player.
- Tor Ørvig, 77, Norwegian-Swedish paleontologist.

=== 28 ===
- Olivier Alain, 75, French organist, pianist, musicologist and composer.
- Harvey Leibenstein, 71, Ukrainian-American economist.
- Jozef Melis, 74, Belgian footballer.
- Jamie Nicolson, 22, Australian boxer and Olympian (1992).
- Pujie, 86, Chinese Qing dynasty imperial prince.
- Enrico Maria Salerno, 67, Italian actor, voice actor and film director, lung cancer.
- Jimmy Stevens, 74, Ni-Vanuatu nationalist and politician, stomach cancer.
- Jürgen von Alten, 91, German actor, screenwriter and film director.
- Skippy Williams, 77, American jazz tenor saxophonist and musical arranger.
