= 1956 WAAA Championships =

British athletics event

- Dates: 11 August
- Host city: London
- Venue: White City Stadium
- Level: Senior
- Type: Outdoor

The 1956 WAAA Championships were the national track and field championships for women in the United Kingdom.

The event was held at White City Stadium, London, on 11 August 1956.

== Results ==
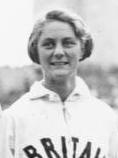
Dorothy Tyler won her 8th high jump title (her first was 20 years previous back in 1936)

Event	Gold		Silver		Bronze	
100 yards	June Paul	10.6w	Anne Pashley	10.7w	Heather Armitage	10.7w
220 yards	June Paul	23.8w	Jean Scrivens	24.0w	Shirley Hampton	24.5w
440 yards	Janet Ruff	56.5 WR	Janice Bonner	57.0	Joy Buckmaster	57.6
880 yards	Phyllis Perkins	2:13.2	Betty Loakes	2:15.7	Madeleine Ibbotson	2:16.1
1 mile	Diane Leather	5:01.0	June Bridgland	5:03.2	Anne Oliver	5:06.4
80 metres hurdles	Pamela Elliott	11.1w	Iris Pond	11.2w	Pauline Wainwright	11.2w
High jump	Dorothy Tyler	1.600	Mary Bignal	1.600	Jean Pearce	1.600
Long jump	Sheila Hoskin	5.65	Jean Whitehead	5.64	Christina Cops	5.59
Shot put	Suzanne Allday	13.39	Josephine Cook	12.16	Mary Nusser	11.12
Discus throw	Suzanne Allday	47.02 NR	Sylvia Needham	41.29	Maya Giri	40.73
Javelin	(Germany) Doris Orphall	40.82	Monica Podmore	40.62	Averil Williams	39.61
Pentathlon +	Margaret Rowley	3812	(Northern Ireland) Mary Peters	3679	Alma Osborne	3656
1 mile walk	Dilys Williams	7:47.6	Beryl Randle	7:58.2	Rita Phillips	8:13.4

+ Held on 15 September at Birmingham University

== See also ==
- 1956 AAA Championships
