= 1954 European Athletics Championships – Women's 4 × 100 metres relay =

Women's 4 × 100 metres relay at the European Athletics Championships

The women's 4 × 100 metres relay at the 1954 European Athletics Championships was held in Bern, Switzerland, at Stadion Neufeld on 28 and 29 August 1954.

== Medalists ==
Gold	Vera Krepkina; Rimma Ulitkina; Mariya Itkina; Irina Turova; Soviet Union
Silver	Irmgard Egert; Charlotte Böhmer; Irene Brutting; Maria Sander; West Germany
Bronze	Maria Musso; Giuseppina Leone; Letizia Bertoni; Milena Greppi; Italy

== Results ==
=== Final ===
29 August

Rank	Nation	Competitors	Time	Notes
1st place, gold medalist(s)	Soviet Union	Vera Krepkina; Rimma Ulitkina; Mariya Itkina; Irina Turova	45.8	CR
2nd place, silver medalist(s)	West Germany	Irmgard Egert; Charlotte Böhmer; Irene Brutting; Maria Sander	46.3	
3rd place, bronze medalist(s)	Italy	Maria Musso; Giuseppina Leone; Letizia Bertoni; Milena Greppi	46.6	NR
4	Great Britain	Heather Armitage; Jean Desforges; Shirley Hampton; Anne Pashley	46.7	
5	Poland	Maria Ilwicka; Barbara Lerczak; Celina Jesionowska; Maria Kusion	47.1	NR
6	Czechoslovakia	Zlata Ptáčková; Jana Rábová; Anna Kovaříková; Libuše Strejčková	48.5	

=== Heats ===
28 August

==== Heat 1 ====
Rank	Nation	Competitors	Time	Notes
1	Italy	Maria Musso; Giuseppina Leone; Letizia Bertoni; Milena Greppi	46.8	CR NR Q
2	West Germany	Irmgard Egert; Charlotte Böhmer; Irene Brutting; Maria Sander	47.1	Q
3	Poland	Maria Ilwicka; Barbara Lerczak; Celina Jesionowska; Maria Kusion	47.3	NR Q
4	France	Henriette Robert; Yvette Monginou; Monique Jacquet; Denise Laborie	47.4	NR
5	Hungary	Olga Gyarmati; Ida Dénes; Ibolya Greminger; Vera Neszmélyi	48.5	
6	Switzerland	Edith Jakob; Trudy Hänseler; Gretel Bolliger; Sonja Pretot	48.8	NR

==== Heat 2 ====
Rank	Nation	Competitors	Time	Notes
1	Soviet Union	Vera Krepkina; Rimma Ulitkina; Mariya Itkina; Irina Turova	46.1	CR Q
2	Great Britain	Heather Armitage; Jean Desforges; Shirley Hampton; Anne Pashley	46.7	Q
3	Czechoslovakia	Zlata Ptáčková; Jana Rábová; Anna Kovaříková; Libuše Strejčková	48.3	Q
4	Austria	Trude Wareka; Elfriede Steurer; Elfriede Geist; Friedrike Harasek	48.3	NR
5	Saar	Inge Eckel; Helga Hoffmann; Trudi Schaller; Ursula Finger	48.3	NR

== Participation ==
According to an unofficial count, 44 athletes from 11 countries participated in the event.

- Austria (4)
- France (4)
- Czechoslovakia (4)
- Hungary (4)
- Italy (4)
- Poland (4)
- Saar (4)
- Soviet Union (4)
- Switzerland (4)
- Great Britain (4)
- West Germany (4)
