= 1954 European Athletics Championships – Women's 200 metres =

Women's 200 metres at the European Athletics Championships

The women's 200 metres at the 1954 European Athletics Championships was held in Bern, Switzerland, at Stadion Neufeld on 28 and 29 August 1954.

== Medalists ==
Gold	Mariya Itkina; Soviet Union
Silver	Irina Turova; Soviet Union
Bronze	Shirley Hampton; Great Britain

== Results ==
=== Final ===
29 August

Rank	Name	Nationality	Time	Notes
1st place, gold medalist(s)	Mariya Itkina	Soviet Union	24.3	
2nd place, silver medalist(s)	Irina Turova	Soviet Union	24.4	
3rd place, bronze medalist(s)	Shirley Hampton	Great Britain	24.4	
4	Barbara Janiszewska	Poland	24.4	NR
5	Rimma Ulitkina	Soviet Union	24.7	
6	Charlotte Böhmer	West Germany	25.0	

=== Semi-finals ===
28 August

==== Semi-final 1 ====
Rank	Name	Nationality	Time	Notes
1	Mariya Itkina	Soviet Union	24.3	Q
2	Shirley Hampton	Great Britain	24.6	Q
3	Rimma Ulitkina	Soviet Union	24.8	Q
4	Patricia Devine	Great Britain	24.8	
5	Dicki van Dijk	Netherlands	25.3	
6	Helga Erny	West Germany	25.7	

==== Semi-final 2 ====
Rank	Name	Nationality	Time	Notes
1	Irina Turova	Soviet Union	24.5	Q
2	Charlotte Böhmer	West Germany	24.9	Q
3	Barbara Janiszewska	Poland	24.9	Q
4	Maria Jeibmann	West Germany	25.0	
5	Anne Johnson	Great Britain	25.5	
	Bertha Van Duyne	Netherlands	DNS	

=== Heats ===
28 August

==== Heat 1 ====
Rank	Name	Nationality	Time	Notes
1	Patricia Devine	Great Britain	24.9	Q
2	Rimma Ulitkina	Soviet Union	24.9	Q
3	Helga Erny	West Germany	25.4	Q
4	Anna-Lise Thoresen	Norway	25.4	
5	Josiane Fournet	France	25.4	

==== Heat 2 ====
Rank	Name	Nationality	Time	Notes
1	Bertha Van Duyne	Netherlands	24.9	Q
2	Charlotte Böhmer	West Germany	25.1	Q
3	Anne Johnson	Great Britain	25.8	Q
4	Grete Jenny	Austria	26.6	
5	Aycan Önel	Turkey	27.4	

==== Heat 3 ====
Rank	Name	Nationality	Time	Notes
1	Shirley Hampton	Great Britain	24.5	Q
2	Barbara Janiszewska	Poland	24.5	Q
3	Irina Turova	Soviet Union	24.6	Q
4	Libuše Strejčková	Czechoslovakia	25.6	
5	Trudy Hänseler	Switzerland	26.5	

==== Heat 4 ====
Rank	Name	Nationality	Time	Notes
1	Mariya Itkina	Soviet Union	24.6	Q
2	Maria Jeibmann	West Germany	25.3	Q
3	Dicki van Dijk	Netherlands	25.5	Q
4	Sonja Pretot	Switzerland	26.3	

== Participation ==
According to an unofficial count, 19 athletes from 11 countries participated in the event.

- Austria (1)
- Czechoslovakia (1)
- France (1)
- Netherlands (2)
- Norway (1)
- Poland (1)
- Soviet Union (3)
- Switzerland (2)
- Turkey (1)
- Great Britain (3)
- West Germany (3)
