= 1954 European Athletics Championships – Women's 100 metres =

Women's 100 metres at the 1954 European Athletics Championships
- Venue: Stadion Neufeld
- Location: Bern
- Dates: 26 August (heats); 27 August (semifinals & final)
- Competitors: 31 from 15 nations
- Winning time: 11.8

Medalists
gold medal	Irina Turova	Soviet Union
silver medal	Bertha Van Duyne	Netherlands
bronze medal	Anne Pashley	Great Britain

The women's 100 metres at the 1954 European Athletics Championships was held in Bern, Switzerland, at Stadion Neufeld on 26 and 27 August 1954.

== Participation ==
According to an unofficial count, 31 athletes from 15 countries participated in the event.

- Austria (2)
- Czechoslovakia (1)
- France (3)
- Hungary (2)
- Italy (1)
- Netherlands (3)
- Norway (1)
- Poland (2)
- Saar (2)
- Soviet Union (3)
- Switzerland (3)
- Turkey (1)
- Great Britain (3)
- West Germany (3)
- Yugoslavia (1)

== Results ==
=== Heats ===
26 August

==== Heat 1 ====
Rank	Name	Nationality	Time	Notes
1	Irina Turova	Soviet Union	11.9	Q
2	Elfriede Butz	West Germany	12.3	Q
3	Anna Kovaříková	Czechoslovakia	12.4	
4	Monique Jacquet	France	12.5	
5	Doris Kunz	Switzerland	13.0	

==== Heat 2 ====
Rank	Name	Nationality	Time	Notes
1	Anne Pashley	Great Britain	11.9	Q
2	Irmgard Egert	West Germany	12.1	Q
3	Ibolya Greminger	Hungary	12.3	
4	Yvette Monginou	France	12.4	
5	Sonja Pretot	Switzerland	12.7	
6	Aycan Önel	Turkey	12.9	

==== Heat 3 ====
Rank	Name	Nationality	Time	Notes
1	Giuseppina Leone	Italy	12.2	Q
2	Vera Neszmélyi	Hungary	12.3	Q
3	Patricia Devine	Great Britain	12.5	
4	Anna-Lise Thoresen	Norway	12.5	
5	Milka Babović	Yugoslavia	12.7	

==== Heat 4 ====
Rank	Name	Nationality	Time	Notes
1	Heather Armitage	Great Britain	12.1	Q
2	Barbara Janiszewska	Poland	12.3	Q
3	Henriette Robert	France	12.5	
4	Els Witkamp	Netherlands	12.7	
5	Edith Jakob	Switzerland	12.9	

==== Heat 5 ====
Rank	Name	Nationality	Time	Notes
1	Bertha Van Duyne	Netherlands	11.9	Q
2	Celina Jesionowska	Poland	12.3	Q
3	Inge Eckel	Saar	12.5	
4	Friedrike Harasek	Austria	12.7	
5	Olga Kosheleva	Soviet Union	12.7	

==== Heat 6 ====
Rank	Name	Nationality	Time	Notes
1	Mariya Itkina	Soviet Union	12.1	Q
2	Charlotte Böhmer	West Germany	12.3	Q
3	Hilde Veth	Netherlands	12.4	
4	Elfriede Geist	Austria	12.6	
5	Trudi Schaller	Saar	12.8	

=== Semi-finals ===
27 August

==== Semi-final 1 ====
Rank	Name	Nationality	Time	Notes
1	Giuseppina Leone	Italy	11.9	Q
2	Bertha Van Duyne	Netherlands	11.9	Q
3	Heather Armitage	Great Britain	12.0	Q
4	Mariya Itkina	Soviet Union	12.1	
5	Charlotte Böhmer	West Germany	12.2	
6	Celina Jesionowska	Poland	12.4	

==== Semi-final 2 ====
Rank	Name	Nationality	Time	Notes
1	Irina Turova	Soviet Union	12.1	Q
2	Anne Pashley	Great Britain	12.1	Q
3	Vera Neszmélyi	Hungary	12.2	Q
4	Barbara Janiszewska	Poland	12.2	
5	Irmgard Egert	West Germany	12.6	
6	Elfriede Butz	West Germany	12.6	

=== Final ===
27 August

Rank	Name	Nationality	Time	Notes
1st place, gold medalist(s)	Irina Turova	Soviet Union	11.8	
2nd place, silver medalist(s)	Bertha Van Duyne	Netherlands	11.9	
3rd place, bronze medalist(s)	Anne Pashley	Great Britain	11.9	
4	Giuseppina Leone	Italy	12.0	
5	Vera Neszmélyi	Hungary	12.1	
6	Heather Armitage	Great Britain	12.1	
