= 1957 WAAA Championships =

British athletics event

- Dates: 5–6 July
- Host city: London
- Venue: White City Stadium
- Level: Senior
- Type: Outdoor

The 1957 WAAA Championships were the national track and field championships for women in the United Kingdom. The Championships were held over two days for the first time.

The event was held at White City Stadium, London, from 5 to 6 July 1957.

== Results ==
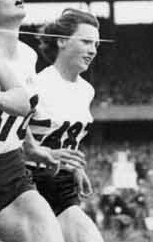
Heather Young won both the 100 and 220 yards titles

Event	Gold		Silver		Bronze	
100 yards	Heather Young	10.9	Madeleine Weston	11.1	Elizabeth Wheeler	11.2
220 yards	Heather Young	24.2 NR	Moyra Hiscox	24.6	Jill Dudderidge	25.0
440 yards	Janet Ruff	56.4 WR	Violet Murphy	56.5	Margaret Pickerill	56.7
880 yards	Diane Leather	2:09.4	Phyllis Perkins	2:10.8	Anne Oliver	2:11.2
1 mile	Diane Leather	4:55.3	Maureen Bonnano	5:01.0	Roma Ashby	5:03.5
80 metres hurdles	(Northern Ireland) Thelma Hopkins	11.4	Carole Quinton	11.5	Carolyn Ivins	11.6
High jump	(Northern Ireland) Thelma Hopkins	1.651	Susan Etherton	1.651	Mary Bignal	1.626
Long jump	Christina Persighetti	5.87	Jean Whitehead	5.72	Carole Hamby	5.62
Shot put	Josephine Cook	12.60	Gwen Charman	11.63	Joan Linsell	11.38
Discus throw	Sylvia Needham	40.22	Maya Giri	39.45	Maureen Burtenshaw	38.19
Javelin	Averil Williams	40.23	Mary Tadd	38.27	Margaret Callender	37.42
Pentathlon +	Margaret Rowley	4183	Joan Day	3964	Janet Pulfer	3706
1 mile walk	Dilys Williams	8:08.4	Helen Vincent	8:08.8	Betty Franklin	8:23.0

+ Held on 31 August at Birmingham University

== See also ==
- 1957 AAA Championships
