= 1954 WAAA Championships =

British athletics event

- Dates: 19 June
- Host city: London
- Venue: White City Stadium
- Level: Senior
- Type: Outdoor

The 1954 WAAA Championships were the national track and field championships for women in the United Kingdom.

The event was held at White City Stadium, London, on 19 June 1954.

== Results ==
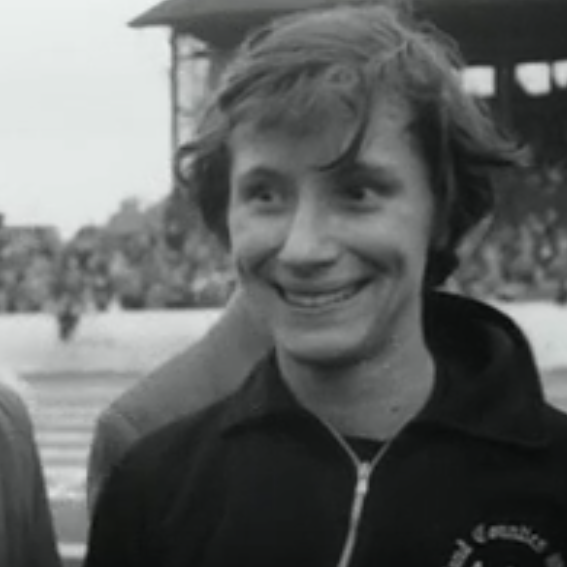
Diane Leather set a world record when winning the 880 yards

| Event | Gold | | Silver | | Bronze | |
|---|---|---|---|---|---|---|
| 100 yards | Anne Pashley | 11.1 | (Scotland) Patricia Devine | 11.1 | Heather Armitage | 11.3 |
| 220 yards | Ann Johnson | 25.1 | Shirley Hampton | 25.2 | Margaret Brian | 25.3 |
| 440 yards | Gloria Goldsborough | 57.1 | Janet Ruff | 57.4 | Madeleine Wooller | 59.2 |
| 880 yards | Diane Leather | 2:09.0 WR | Anne Oliver | 2:11.4 | Valerie Winn | 2:11.7 |
| 1 mile | Phyllis Green | 5:09.6 | Helen Vincent | 5:11.4 | (Scotland) Aileen Drummond | 5:12.9 |
| 80 metres hurdles | Jean Desforges | 11.4 | Pamela Seaborne | 11.5 | (Northern Ireland) Thelma Hopkins | 11.7 |
| High jump | Sheila Lerwill | 1.651 | Dorothy Tyler | 1.626 | (Northern Ireland) Thelma Hopkins | 1.575 |
| Long jump | Jean Desforges | 5.83 | Shirley Cawley | 5.73 | Jean Whitehead | 5.43 |
| Shot put | Suzanne Allday | 12.52 | Josephine Cook | 11.40 | Maya Giri | 10.41 |
| Discus throw | Maya Giri | 39.42 | Suzanne Allday | 39.09 | Sylvia Needham | 36.32 |
| Javelin | Ann Dukes | 39.55 | Anne Collins | 38.20 | Jacqueline Ogden | 36.27 |
| Pentathlon + | Jean Desforges | 3170 (3973) | Pamela French | 2983 (3854) | Betty Lovell | 2695 (3639) |
| 1 mile walk | Beryl Randle | 7:38.4 | Patricia Grant | 8:07.2 | Rita Phillips | 8:18.0 |

+ Held on 4 September at Paddington

== See also ==
- 1954 AAA Championships
