= 1958 European Athletics Championships – Women's long jump =

Women's long jump at the European Athletics Championships

The women's long jump at the 1958 European Athletics Championships was held in Stockholm, Sweden, at Stockholms Olympiastadion on 21 and 22 August 1958.

== Medalists ==
Gold	Liesel Jakobi; West Germany
Silver	Valentina Lituyeva; Soviet Union
Bronze	Nina Protsenko; Soviet Union

== Results ==
=== Final ===
22 August

Rank	Name	Nationality	Result	Notes
1st place, gold medalist(s)	Liesel Jakobi	West Germany	6.14	CR
2nd place, silver medalist(s)	Valentina Lituyeva	Soviet Union	6.00	
3rd place, bronze medalist(s)	Nina Protsenko	Soviet Union	5.99	
4	Aida Chuyko	Soviet Union	5.99	
5	Maria Ciastowska	Poland	5.97	
6	Maria Chojnacka	Poland	5.97	
7	Helga Hoffmann	West Germany	5.85	
8	Inga Broberg	Sweden	5.85	
9	Jean Whitehead	Great Britain	5.84	
10	Marthe Djian	France	5.83	
11	Zlata Rozkošná	Czechoslovakia	5.78	
12	Erika Fisch	West Germany	5.72	
13	Teresa Wieczorek	Poland	5.63	
14	Sheila Hoskin	Great Britain	5.56	

=== Qualification ===
21 August

Rank	Name	Nationality	Result	Notes
1	Marthe Djian	France	6.13	CR NR Q
2	Maria Ciastowska	Poland	?	Q
3	Erika Fisch	West Germany	5.95	Q
4	Liesel Jakobi	West Germany	5.93	Q
5	Helga Hoffmann	West Germany	5.92	Q
6	Zlata Rozkošná	Czechoslovakia	5.83	Q
7	Nina Protsenko	Soviet Union	5.78	Q
8	Aida Chuyko	Soviet Union	5.72	Q
9	Teresa Wieczorek	Poland	5.69	Q
10	Maria Chojnacka	Poland	5.68	Q
11	Sheila Hoskin	Great Britain	5.68	Q
12	Jean Whitehead	Great Britain	5.67	Q
13	Inga Broberg	Sweden	5.62	Q
14	Valentina Lituyeva	Soviet Union	5.61	Q
15	Annie Segouffin	France	5.51	
16	Reinelde Knapp	Austria	5.35	

== Participation ==
According to an unofficial count, 16 athletes from 8 countries participated in the event.

- Austria (1)
- Czechoslovakia (1)
- France (2)
- Poland (3)
- Soviet Union (3)
- Sweden (1)
- Great Britain (2)
- West Germany (3)
