= 1953 WAAA Championships =

British athletics event

- Dates: 4 July
- Host city: London
- Venue: White City Stadium
- Level: Senior
- Type: Outdoor

The 1953 WAAA Championships were the national track and field championships for women in the United Kingdom.

The event was held at White City Stadium, London, on 4 July 1953.

== Results ==
| Event | Gold | | Silver | | Bronze | |
|---|---|---|---|---|---|---|
| 100 yards | Anne Pashley | 11.0 | Shirley Burgess | 11.1 | Jean Scrivens | 11.2 |
| 220 yards | Ann Johnson | 25.0 | Anne Pashley | 25.2 | Jean Newboult | 25.5 |
| 440 yards | Valerie Winn (Ball) | 57.6 | Betty Loakes | 57.8 | Dorothy Saunders | 59.9 |
| 880 yards | Anne Oliver | 2:15.0 | Norah Smalley | 2:17.8 | Diane Leather | 2:18.2 |
| 1 mile | Enid Harding | 5:09.8 WR | Phyllis Green | 5:14.8 | Dilys Williams | 5:17.3 |
| 80 metres hurdles | Jean Desforges | 11.5 | Iris Pond | 11.6 | Sheila Sewell | 11.6 |
| High jump | Sheila Lerwill | 1.651 | (Northern Ireland) Thelma Hopkins | 1.651 | Dorothy Tyler | 1.600 |
| Long jump | Jean Desforges | 5.76 | Sheila Sewell | 5.47 | Shirley Cawley | 5.47 |
| Shot put | Joan Linsell | 12.11 | Suzanne Farmer | 12.04 | Maya Giri | 10.51 |
| Discus throw | Suzanne Farmer | 40.01 | Maya Giri | 37.85 | Pamela Jones | 37.54 |
| Javelin | Anne Collins | 36.56 | Joy Evans | 35.99 | Jean Elliott | 35.36 |
| Pentathlon + | Jean Desforges | 3221 (3997 NR) | Joan Linsell | 2931 (3815) | Betty Lovell | 2903 (3761) |
| 1 mile walk | Beryl Randle | 7:48.2 | Sheila Jennings (Martin) | 7:49.8 | Sheila Irwin | 8:16.8 |

+ Held on 12 September at Birmingham

== See also ==
- 1953 AAA Championships
