= Athletics at the 1954 British Empire and Commonwealth Games – Women's 220 yards =

Women's 220 yards at the Commonwealth Games
- Venue: Empire Stadium
- Dates: 4 and 6 August

The women's 220 yards event at the 1954 British Empire and Commonwealth Games was held on 4 and 6 August at the Empire Stadium in Vancouver, Canada.

== Medalists ==
Gold	Silver	Bronze
Marjorie Jackson; Australia	Winsome Cripps; Australia	Shirley Hampton; England

== Results ==
=== Heats ===
Held on 5 August

Qualification: First 2 in each heat (Q) qualify directly for the final.

Rank	Heat	Name	Nationality	Time	Notes
1	1	Winsome Cripps	Australia	24.7	Q
2	1	Ann Johnson	England	25.4	Q
3	1	Shirley Burgess	England	25.4	
4	1	Diane Palmason	Canada	25.9	
5	1	Norma Higgs	Canada	26.4	
1	2	Marjorie Jackson	Australia	24.3	Q
2	2	Shirley Hampton	England	25.5	Q
3	2	Patricia Devine	Scotland	25.7	
4	2	Annabelle Murray	Canada	26.2	
1	3	Geraldine Bemister	Canada	25.6	Q
2	3	Heather Armitage	England	25.6	Q
3	3	Nancy Fogarty	Australia	25.8	
	3	Marlene Mathews	Australia	DNS	

=== Final ===
Rank	Name	Nationality	Time	Notes
1st place, gold medalist(s)	Marjorie Jackson	Australia	24.0	GR
2nd place, silver medalist(s)	Winsome Cripps	Australia	24.5	
3rd place, bronze medalist(s)	Shirley Hampton	England	25.0	
4	Ann Johnson	England	25.2	
5	Heather Armitage	England	25.3	
6	Geraldine Bemister	Canada	25.5	
