= Valentina Lituyeva =

Soviet athletics competitor (1930–2008)

Medal record

Women's athletics

Representing the Soviet Union

European Championships
Gold medal – first place	1950 Brussels	Long jump
Silver medal – second place	1958 Stockholm	Long jump

Valentina Mikhaylovna Lituyeva (Russian: Валентина Михайловна Литуева; 11 February 1930 – 4 April 2008) was a Soviet track and field athlete who competed in the long jump. Her personal best was 6.10 m (20 ft 0 in) and she was the European champion in the event in 1950.

Born Valentina Bogdanova (Russian: Валентина Богданова) in Leningrad, she joined local club Burevestnik Leningrad and ranked within the top ten in the world for the first time in 1949, having jumped a best of 5.76 m (18 ft 10 3/4 in) that year. She improved to 5.87 m (19 ft 3 in) in the 1950 season. Fellow Soviet athlete Aleksandra Chudina topped the world rankings that year, but in her absence at the 1950 European Athletics Championships Lituyeva won the long jump easily, nearly twenty centimetres ahead of the runner-up Wilhelmina Lust of the Netherlands.

Lituyeva missed the 1951 season but returned for the 1952 Summer Olympics and managed to place eleventh in the final. She improved to 5.98 m (19 ft 7 1/4 in) and ranked fifth for the season. Her next international appearance was at the 1955 World Festival of Youth and Students. She won a bronze medal and the level of competition was high, with Galina Vinogradova taking the title with one of the best jumps that year. Lituyeva cleared six metres for the first time with a jump of 6.07 m (19 ft 10 3/4 in) that November. She remained at a high standard until her last season in 1959, jumping beyond six metres each year and setting a career best of 6.10 m (20 ft 0 in) in Moscow in 1958.

Lituyeva returned to try to regain her long jump title at the 1958 European Athletics Championships, but came up short behind West German athlete Liesel Jakobi and ended up with the silver medal. That was the last major competition that she competed in.

== International competitions ==
Year	Competition	Venue	Position	Event	Notes
1950	European Championships	Brussels, Belgium	1st	Long jump	5.82 m
1952	Olympic Games	Helsinki, Finland	11th	Long jump	5.65 m
1955	World Festival of Youth and Students	Warsaw, Poland	3rd	Long jump	5.90 m
1958	European Championships	Stockholm, Sweden	2nd	Long jump	6.00 m

== See also ==
- List of European Athletics Championships medalists (women)
