= 1950 European Athletics Championships – Women's long jump =

Women's long jump at the European Athletics Championships

The women's long jump at the 1950 European Athletics Championships was held in Brussels, Belgium, at Heysel Stadium on 24 August 1950.

== Medalists ==
| Gold | Valentina Bogdanova; Soviet Union |
| Silver | Wilhelmina Lust; Netherlands |
| Bronze | Maire Österdahl; Finland |

== Results ==
=== Final ===
24 August

| Rank | Name | Nationality | Result | Notes |
|---|---|---|---|---|
| 1st place, gold medalist(s) | Valentina Bogdanova | Soviet Union | 5.82 | |
| 2nd place, silver medalist(s) | Wilhelmina Lust | Netherlands | 5.63 | |
| 3rd place, bronze medalist(s) | Maire Österdahl | Finland | 5.57 | |
| 4 | Yvonne Curtet-Chabot | France | 5.38 | |
| 5 | Silvana Pierucci | Italy | 5.34 | |
| 6 | Margaret Erskine | Great Britain | 5.29 | |
| 7 | Valerie Ann Webster | Great Britain | 5.29 | |
| 8 | Tineke de Jongh | Netherlands | 5.23 | |
| 9 | Monique Jacquet | France | 5.22 | |
| 10 | Spomenka Koledin | Yugoslavia | 5.22 | |
| 11 | Nel de Vos | Netherlands | 5.22 | |
| 12 | Paulette Dussarat | France | 5.09 | |
| 13 | Milica Šumak | Yugoslavia | 5.05 | |
| 14 | Patricia Devine | Great Britain | 4.95 | |

== Participation ==
According to an unofficial count, 14 athletes from 7 countries participated in the event.

- Finland (1)
- France (3)
- Italy (1)
- Netherlands (3)
- Soviet Union (1)
- Great Britain (3)
- Yugoslavia (2)
