= Constance Willoughby =

British long jumper

Constance Willoughby née Smith
Personal information
- Nationality: British (English)
- Born: 6 January 1930
- Died: December 1997 Kettering, England

Sport
- Sport: Athletics
- Event: Long jump
- Club: Middlesex Ladies Athletic Club

Constance Lydia Willoughby née Smith (6 January 1930 – December 1997) was a British athlete who competed at the 1952 Summer Olympics.

== Biography ==
Born Constance Smith, she married Highgate Harriers' sprinter Derek Willoughby in March 1952. Three months later she finished second behind Shirley Cawley in the long jump event at the 1952 WAAA Championships.

The following month she represented Great Britain at the 1952 Olympic Games in Helsinki, in the women's long jump compeititon.
