= Athletics at the 1955 Summer International University Sports Week – Women's 4 × 100 metres relay =

The women's 4 × 100 metres relay event at the 1955 International University Sports Week was held in San Sebastián on 14 August 1955.

== Results ==
Rank	Nation	Athletes	Time	Notes
1st place, gold medalist(s)	Italy	Angiolina Costantino, Giuseppina Leone, Luciana Cecchi, Milena Greppi	49.0	
2nd place, silver medalist(s)	West Germany	Hilde Ostermann, Hilke Thymm, Ilse Schauwienhold, Ursula Schitteck	49.5	
3rd place, bronze medalist(s)	Great Britain	L. Barr, W. Bowden, Ann Cartwright, Mary Bridgeford	50.5	
