= Athletics at the 1955 Summer International University Sports Week – Women's discus throw =

The women's discus throw event at the 1955 International University Sports Week was held in San Sebastián on 11 August 1955.

== Results ==
Rank	Name	Nationality	Result	Notes
1st place, gold medalist(s)	Almut Brömmel	West Germany	43.48	
2nd place, silver medalist(s)	Lore Klute	West Germany	41.51	
3rd place, bronze medalist(s)	Maya Giri	Great Britain	41.39	
4	Ursula Dreimann	West Germany	34.63	
5	Babette Schweizer	Switzerland	31.99	
6	Mary Bridgeford	Great Britain	31.13	
