= Athletics at the 1952 Summer Olympics – Women's long jump =

Women's long jump at the Games of the XV Olympiad
- Date: July 23, 1952
- Competitors: 34 from 22 nations
- Winning distance: 6.24 OR

Medalists
1st place, gold medalist(s)		Yvette Williams; New Zealand
2nd place, silver medalist(s)		Aleksandra Chudina; Soviet Union
3rd place, bronze medalist(s)		Shirley Cawley; Great Britain

The Women's long jump at the 1952 Olympic Games took place on July 23 at the Helsinki Olympic Stadium. Yvette Williams from New Zealand won the gold medal and set a new Olympic record.

== Records ==
Prior to this competition, the existing world and Olympic records were as follows.

World record	(Netherlands) Fanny Blankers-Koen (NED)	6.25 m	Leiden, Netherlands	19 September 1943
Olympic record	Olga Gyarmati (HUN)	5.69 m	London, United Kingdom	4 August 1948

The following new Olympic records was set during this competition.

Date	Event	Athlete	Time	OR	WR
23 July	Final	Yvette Williams (NZL)	6.24 m	OR	

== Results ==
=== Qualifying round ===
Qualifying Performance 5.30 advance to the Final.

Rank	Group	Name	Nationality	Mark
1	B	Yvette Williams	New Zealand	6.16 OR
2	B	Mabel Landry	United States	5.88
3	A	Aleksandra Chudina	Soviet Union	5.77
4	B	Nina Tyurkina	Soviet Union	5.77
5	A	Shirley Cawley	Great Britain	5.73
6	B	Wilhelmina Lust	Netherlands	5.63
7	B	Elfriede von Nitzsch	Germany	5.62
7	B	Maire Österdahl	Finland	5.62
9	B	Irmgard Schmelzer	Germany	5.61
10	A	Verna Johnston	Australia	5.58
11	A	Thelma Jones	Bermuda	5.55
12	A	Gladys Erbetta	Argentina	5.51
13	B	Valentina Lituyeva	Soviet Union	5.51
14	A	Olga Gyarmati	Hungary	5.50
15	B	Adriana Millard	Chile	5.49
16	B	Greta Magnusson	Sweden	5.45
17	B	Constance Willoughby	Great Britain	5.44
18	A	Elżbieta Krzesińska	Poland	5.43
19	A	Leni Hofknecht	Germany	5.41
20	A	Yvonne Chabot-Curtet	France	5.36
21	B	Wanda dos Santos	Brazil	5.35
22	B	Dawn Josephs	Canada	5.34
22	B	Ayako Yoshikawa	Japan	5.34
24	A	Helena de Menezes	Brazil	5.33
25	A	Ursel Finger	Saar	5.27
26	A	Suzanne Glotin	France	5.26
27	A	Lilián Buglia	Argentina	5.25
28	A	Éliane Dudal	France	5.21
29	B	Tamara Metal	Israel	5.16
30	A	Gretel Bolliger	Switzerland	5.14
31	B	Kathleen Russell	Jamaica	5.10
32	A	Maria Piątkowska	Poland	5.09
33	A	Phyllis Lightbourn-Jones	Bermuda	4.92
	B	Rosella Thorne	Canada	NM
	A	Barbara Jones	United States	DNS

=== Final ===
Rank	Athlete	Nationality	1	2	3	4	5	6	Result
1st place, gold medalist(s)	Yvette Williams	New Zealand	x	x	5.90	6.24	6.11	5.99	6.24 OR
2nd place, silver medalist(s)	Aleksandra Chudina	Soviet Union	5.99	6.14	5.74	5.90	5.95	6.07	6.14
3rd place, bronze medalist(s)	Shirley Cawley	Great Britain	5.92	x	5.53	5.46	5.78	5.82	5.92
4	Irmgard Schmelzer	Germany	5.89	5.76	5.90	x	5.84	x	5.90
5	Wilhelmina Lust	Netherlands	5.68	5.65	5.79	x	5.81	x	5.81
6	Nina Tyurkina	Soviet Union	5.61	5.81	5.76	5.52	x	x	5.81
7	Mabel Landry	United States	x	x	5.75				5.75
8	Verna Johnston	Australia	5.51	5.60	5.74				5.74
9	Maire Österdahl	Finland	5.62	5.73	5.70				5.73
10	Olga Gyarmati	Hungary	5.48	5.67	5.60				5.67
11	Valentina Lituyeva	Soviet Union	5.50	5.63	5.65				5.65
12	Elżbieta Krzesińska	Poland	5.65	5.40	5.55				5.65
13	Adriana Millard	Chile	5.58	5.56	5.59				5.59
14	Elfriede von Nitzsch	Germany	x	5.57	x				5.57
15	Leni Hofknecht	Germany	5.45	5.54	5.55				5.55
16	Ayako Yoshikawa	Japan	5.54	x	5.38				5.54
17	Dawn Josephs	Canada	5.17	5.47	5.44				5.47
18	Gladys Erbetta	Argentina	5.39	5.40	5.47				5.47
19	Constance Willoughby	Great Britain	5.39	5.44	5.13				5.44
20	Greta Magnusson	Sweden	5.37	5.43	5.40				5.43
21	Wanda dos Santos	Brazil	5.36	5.30	5.21				5.36
22	Thelma Jones	Bermuda	5.33	5.27	5.31				5.33
23	Yvonne Chabot-Curtet	France	5.28	4.94	5.09				5.28
24	Helena de Menezes	Brazil	x	4.98	4.66				4.98

NM — No Mark
