= Athletics at the 1955 Summer International University Sports Week – Women's shot put =

The women's shot put event at the 1955 International University Sports Week was held in San Sebastián on 13 August 1955.

== Results ==
Rank	Name	Nationality	Result	Notes
1st place, gold medalist(s)	Lore Klute	West Germany	13.13	GR
2nd place, silver medalist(s)	Almut Brömmel	West Germany	11.63	
3rd place, bronze medalist(s)	Ursula Dreimann	West Germany	11.26	
4	Babette Schweizer	Switzerland	10.12	
5	Maya Giri	Great Britain	9.98	
6	Mary Bridgeford	Great Britain	8.63	
