= George Coleman (athlete) =

British racewalker

Personal information
- Nationality: British (English)
- Born: 21 November 1916 Fulham, London, England
- Died: 27 January 2005 (aged 88) Great Yarmouth, England

Sport
- Sport: Athletics
- Event: racewalking
- Club: Highgate Harriers

George William Coleman (21 November 1916 – 27 January 2005) was a British racewalker who competed in the 1952 Summer Olympics and in the 1956 Summer Olympics.

== Biography ==
Coleman was born in Fulham, England and was a member of the Highgate Harriers.

Coleman finished third behind Roland Hardy in the 2 miles walk event at the 1951 AAA Championships and third behind Hardy in the 7 miles walk at the 1952 AAA Championships. Shortly afterwards he represented the Great Britain team at the 1952 Olympic Games in Helsinki, ranking fifth in the 10 kilometre walk.

Coleman became the British 2 miles walk champion after winning the British AAA Championships title at the 1953 AAA Championships Before scoring the double success of 2 and 7 miles walk at the 1954 AAA Championships.

Coleman won the 2 miles walk again the following year at the 1955 AAA Championships and the 7 miles walk at the 1956 AAA Championships cementing his place as Britain's leading racewalker and later that year represented Great Britain at the 1956 Olympic Games in Melbourne, finishing seventh in the 20 kilometre walk event.

Coleman continued racewalking for many years competing in the 1971 Calne Road Walk, a race he previously won in 1946.
