= Mary Tadd =

Former British athlete

Personal information
- Nationality: British (English)
- Born: 3 August 1936 (age 89) Brentford, England

Sport
- Sport: Athletics
- Event: Javelin
- Club: London Olympiades AC

Mary Ann R Tadd (born 3 August 1936), is a British former athlete who competed for England.

== Biography ==
Tadd finished second behind Averil Williams in the javelin throw event at the 1957 WAAA Championships and the 1958 WAAA Championships.

Shortly afterwards she represented England in the javelin at the 1958 British Empire and Commonwealth Games in Cardiff, Wales.
