= Jean Whitehead =

British long jumper

Personal information
- Nationality: British (English)
- Born: Q3. 1937 Southport, England

Sport
- Sport: Athletics
- Event: long jump
- Club: Liverpool Harriers; London Olympiades AC

Jean Whitehead (born 1937) is a female former athlete who competed for England.

== Biography ==
Whitehead was educated at Southport High School and joined Liverpool Harriers & AC in 1953 and aged just 18 established a new record of 18 ft 9ins (5.71 m) in winning the Northern Senior title in 1955.

Whitehead finished third behind Jean Desforges in the long jump event at the 1954 WAAA Championships and repeated the performance twice more at the 1956 WAAA Championships and 1957 WAAA Championships but this time behind Sheila Hoskin and Christina Persighetti respectively.

Whitehead represented England in the long jump at the 1958 British Empire and Commonwealth Games in Cardiff, Wales.

In 1962 she was teaching physical education at Finchley School.
