= Athletics at the 1955 Summer International University Sports Week – Women's 80 metres hurdles =

The women's 80 metres hurdles event at the 1955 Summer International University Sports Week was held in San Sebastián on 13 August 1955.

== Results ==
Rank	Name	Nationality	Time	Notes
1st place, gold medalist(s)	Milena Greppi	Italy	11.5	GR
2nd place, silver medalist(s)	Hilke Thymm	West Germany	11.5	
3rd place, bronze medalist(s)	Ursula Schitteck	West Germany	12.5	
4	Mary Bridgeford	Great Britain	12.6	
5	Ilse Schauwienhold	West Germany	12.6	
