= Janus van der Zande =

Dutch marathon runner

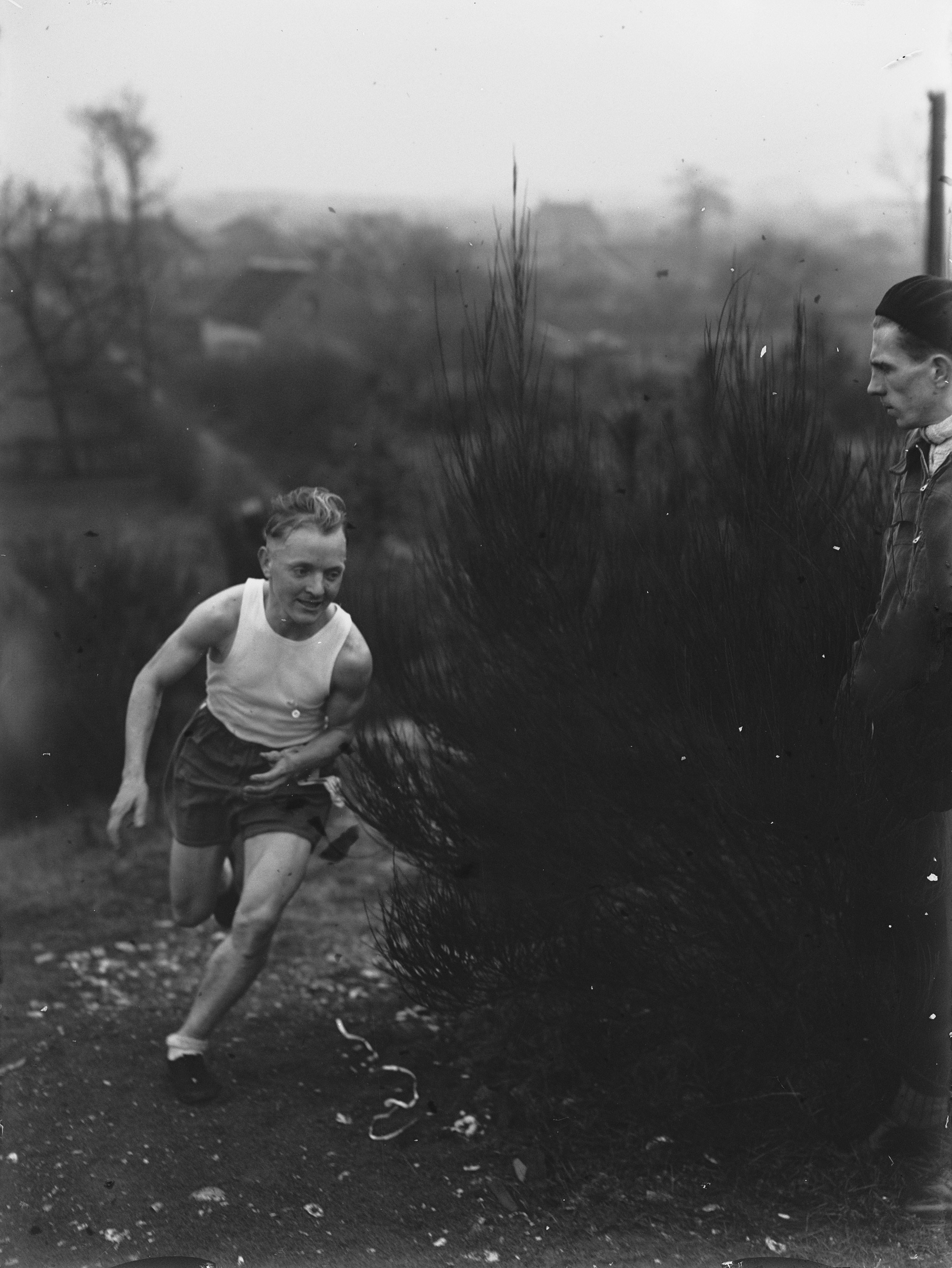
Janus van der Zande (1951)

Janus van der Zande (16 September 1924 – 7 August 2016) was a Dutch marathon runner who competed in the 1952 Summer Olympics. He was born in Halsteren.

Awards
Preceded by Wil Lust	KNAU Cup; 1954	Succeeded by Cor Aafjes
