= Inga Broberg =

Swedish athletics competitor

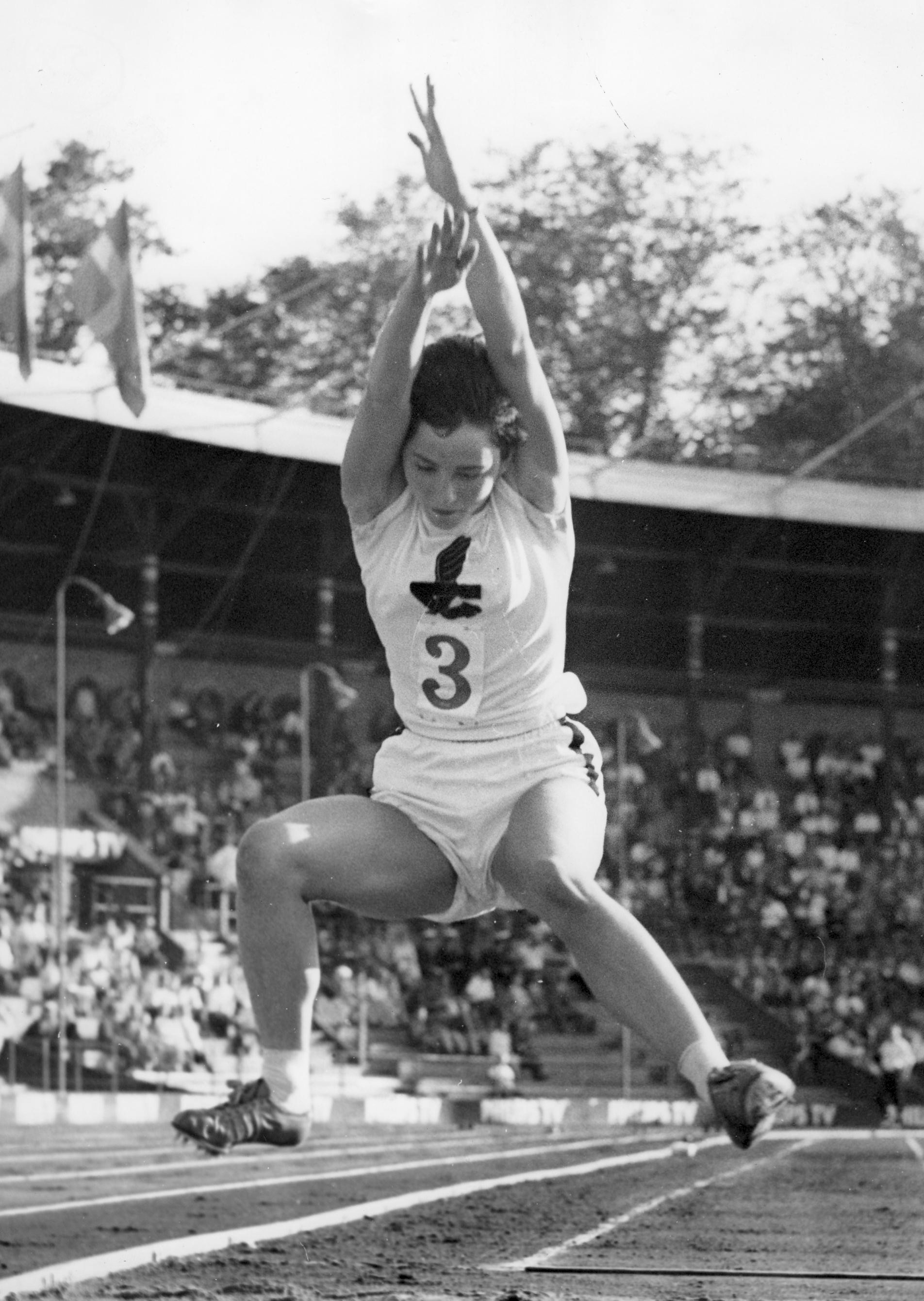

Personal information
- Born: 5 November 1939 (age 86)

Sport
- Sport: Athletics
- Event(s): Long jump, sprint
- Club: SK Svolder; IK Göta, Stockholm

Achievements and titles
- Personal best: LJ – 5.92 m

Inga Broberg (later Stenbrink, born 5 November 1939) is a retired Swedish athlete. She won national titles in the long jump (1958 and 1959) and 4 × 100 m relay (1957) and placed eights in the long jump at the 1958 European Championships.
