= Ellie Leather =

British runner (born 1998)

Personal information
- Nationality: British
- Born: 9 December 1998 (age 27)

Sport
- Sport: Athletics
- Event: Middle distance

Achievements and titles
- Personal best(s): 800m: 2:02.19 (Los Angeles, 2025); 1500m: 4:06.12 (Los Angeles, 2024); Mile: 4:25.23 (Boston, 2024); 3000m: 8:54.67 (Sheffield, 2024); 5000m 15:51.15 (Raleigh, 2024)

Ellie Leather (born 9 December 1998) is a British middle-distance runner. She was a bronze medalist at the 2025 British Indoor Athletics Championships over 1500 metres. She is the great-niece of Diane Leather.

== Early life ==
Leather is a member of Westbury Harriers and Yate & District Athletics Club. She first competed for Westbury in 2008 in the under 11s age group in the Gwent League and the BMC Cross Country Classic in Ashton Court. She attended Marlwood School in South Gloucestershire. She competed in the American college system for Rice University and Cincinnati University on a sporting scholarship.

== Career ==
In March 2021, she ran a personal best time of 4:41.78 for the mile run at the 2021 NCAA Division I Indoor Track and Field Championships in Houston, Texas. The following year, she finished third in the mile at the 2022 NCAA Indoor Championships, in Birmingham, Alabama.

In the summer of 2022, she signed a professional endorsement contract with Under Armour. Competing at the 2022 British Athletics Championship, she was a finalist in the 1500 metres after winning her qualifying heat, placing eighth overall. In 2022, she lowered her personal best to 4:11.33 for the 1500m, and 4:34.89 for the mile.

In January 2024, Leather won the 3000 metres race at the BMC Meeting in Sheffield, with a half-minute personal best time of 8:54.67. In February 2024, she improved her personal best to 4:25.23 at the BU Invitational Mile in Boston, Massachusetts to move to fifth place on the UK indoor all-time mile list. On 17 February 2024, she qualified again for the final at the 2024 British Indoor Athletics Championships in Birmingham, in the 1500 metres.

Leather ran a new 1500 metres personal best time of 4:06.12 in Los Angeles on 17 May 2024. In June 2024, she qualified for the final of the 1500 metres at the 2024 British Athletics Championships in which she placed sixth.

She won bronze over 1500 metres at the 2025 British Indoor Athletics Championships in Birmingham, on 23 February 2025, behind Georgia Bell and Revée Walcott-Nolan.

In May 2025, she set a new personal best for the 800 metres, running 2:02.19 in Los Angeles.

In June 2026, Leather reached the final of the 800 metres at the 2026 British Championships.

== Personal life ==
She is the great-niece of Diane Leather, the first woman to run a sub-5-minute mile.
