= Athletics at the 1955 Summer International University Sports Week – Women's 100 metres =

The women's 100 metres event at the 1955 International University Sports Week was held in San Sebastián on 11 and 14 August 1955.

== Medalists ==
Gold	Silver	Bronze
Giuseppina Leone; Italy	Friederike Harasek; Austria	Hilke Thymm; West Germany

== Results ==
=== Heats ===
Rank	Heat	Athlete	Nationality	Time	Notes
1	1	Giuseppina Leone	Italy	12.3	Q
2	1	Hilke Thymm	West Germany	12.6	Q
3	1	Ann Cartwright	Great Britain	13.0	Q
4	1	L. Barr	Great Britain	13.2	
5	1	Luciana Cecchi	Italy	13.5	
1	2	Friederike Harasek	Austria	12.8	Q
2	2	Hilde Ostermann	West Germany	12.9	Q
3	2	W. Bowden	Great Britain	14.5	Q

=== Final ===
Rank	Name	Nationality	Time	Notes
1st place, gold medalist(s)	Giuseppina Leone	Italy	12.0	GR
2nd place, silver medalist(s)	Friederike Harasek	Austria	12.5	
3rd place, bronze medalist(s)	Hilke Thymm	West Germany	12.6	
4	Ann Cartwright	Great Britain	12.7	
	Hilde Ostermann	West Germany	?	
	W. Bowden	Great Britain	?	
