= Nina Tyurkina =

Soviet long jumper

Personal information
- Nationality: Soviet
- Born: 4 August 1931

Sport
- Sport: Athletics
- Event: Long jump

Nina Tyurkina (born 4 August 1931) is a Soviet athlete. She competed in the women's long jump at the 1952 Summer Olympics.
