= Angèle Picado =

French sprinter

Personal information
- Full name: Marie-Angèle Picado
- Nationality: French
- Born: 13 December 1934 Lisbon, Portugal
- Died: 27 October 1997 (aged 62)

Sport
- Sport: Sprinting
- Event: 4 × 100 metres relay

Marie-Angèle Picado (13 December 1934 – 27 October 1997) was a French sprinter. She competed in the women's 4 × 100 metres relay at the 1956 Summer Olympics.
