= Athletics at the 1955 Summer International University Sports Week – Women's 200 metres =

The women's 200 metres event at the 1955 International University Sports Week was held in San Sebastián on 11 and 13 August 1955.

== Medalists ==
Gold	Silver	Bronze
Giuseppina Leone; Italy	Ann Cartwright; Great Britain	L. Barr; Great Britain

== Results ==
=== Heats ===
Rank	Heat	Athlete	Nationality	Time	Notes
1	1	W. Bowden	Great Britain	26.8	Q
2	1	L. Barr	Great Britain	27.0	Q
3	1	Angiolina Costantino	Italy	27.1	Q
4	1	De Ceuleneer	Belgium	28.1	
1	2	Giuseppina Leone	Italy	25.9	Q
2	2	Ann Cartwright	Great Britain	26.5	Q
3	2	Friederike Harasek	Austria	26.5	Q
4	2	Ursula Schitteck	West Germany	27.8	

=== Final ===
Rank	Name	Nationality	Time	Notes
1st place, gold medalist(s)	Giuseppina Leone	Italy	24.8	GR, NR
2nd place, silver medalist(s)	Ann Cartwright	Great Britain	25.8	
3rd place, bronze medalist(s)	L. Barr	Great Britain	26.4	
4	Angiolina Costantino	Italy	26.7	
5	W. Bowden	Great Britain	26.8	
	Friederike Harasek	Austria	?	
