= Leni Hofknecht =

German long jumper (1929–2021)

Personal information
- Full name: Helene Magdalena Hofknecht
- Nationality: German
- Born: 19 February 1929 Bayreuth, Germany
- Died: 5 September 2021 (aged 92) Jennersville, Pennsylvania, United States

Sport
- Sport: Athletics
- Event: Long jump

Helene Magdalena Hofknecht (19 February 1929 – 5 September 2021) was a German athlete. She competed in the women's long jump at the 1952 Summer Olympics.
