= Dawn Josephs =

Canadian athlete (1932–2023)

Personal information
- Nationality: Canadian
- Born: Evereld Dawn Josephs; 26 February 1932 Duncan, British Columbia, Canada
- Died: 10 October 2023 (aged 91) North Vancouver, British Columbia, Canada

Sport
- Sport: Athletics
- Events: Long jump High jump

Achievements and titles
- Olympic finals: 1 (1952)

Evereld Dawn Macpherson (née Josephs; 26 February 1932 – 10 October 2023) was a Canadian athlete. She competed in the women's long jump and the women's high jump at the 1952 Summer Olympics.

Josephs died in North Vancouver on 10 October 2023, at the age of 91.
