= Josephine Cook =

British shot putter (1931–2023)

Personal information
- Nationality: British (English)
- Born: 9 February 1931
- Died: 20 November 2023 (aged 92)

Sport
- Sport: Athletics
- Event: Shot put
- Club: London Olympiades AC

Josephine Cook (née Page and later Honnor, 9 February 1931 – 20 November 2023) was an English athlete who competed in shot put.

== Biography ==
Cook finished second behind Suzanne Allday in the shot put event at the 1954 WAAA Championships before becoming the national shot put champion after winning the British WAAA Championships title at the 1955 WAAA Championships.

A continuing rivalry with Suzanne Allday, saw Cooke finish second behind her at the 1956 WAAA Championships and 1958 WAAA Championships but Cook won her second title at the 1957 WAAA Championships.

Cook represented England in the shot put at the 1958 British Empire and Commonwealth Games in Cardiff, Wales.

Cook died on 20 November 2023, at the age of 92.
