= Beryl Randle =

British racewalker (1928–2023)

Beryl Randle née Beryl Day
Personal information
- Nationality: British (English)
- Born: 16 December 1928 Tamworth, England
- Died: 28 November 2023 (aged 94)

Sport
- Sport: Athletics
- Event: Race walking
- Club: Birchfield Harriers

Beryl E. M. Randle née Beryl Day (16 December 1928 – 28 November 2023) was a British race walker and an athletics administrator.

== Biography ==
Day took up competitive walking in 1946, after coming last in a 100-metre sprint, and was coached by Doris Nelson Neal. To train, she would walk from her home in Walsall to her workplace in Digbeth, Birmingham, and back - 18 miles (29 km) each day.

Day became the national 1 mile walk champion after winning the British WAAA Championships title at the 1952 WAAA Championships. Beryl Day married Ronald Randle in Birmingham during the latter part of 1952 and would compete under her married name of Randle thereafter.

Randle retained her 1 mile walk title at the 1953 WAAA Championships.

On 29 May 1954, she broke the world record for the one-mile walk, with a time of 7 minutes 49 seconds. On 19 June 1954, she shaved over ten seconds from her own record, at the White City Stadium, with a time of 7 minutes 38.4 seconds. In doing so, she became the Women's Amateur Athletic Association Champion. She was honoured for this achievement with a brooch depicting the stag logo of Birchfield Harriers in solid gold, commissioned by G.H. Alexander, then president of the club. She later said:

I remember finishing the walk with a last gasp supreme effort. I had no idea I was going to break the world record because Nelson our coach was the sort of person who would not give away any times in training which meant that I had no idea what sort of shape that I was in that day... I just went for it from the start.

Randle won her third and fourth 1 mile national titles, after winning the WAAA title at both the 1954 WAAA Championships and the 1955 WAAA Championships.

Randle was a six-time Midland mile track champion, and three-time Midland road-walking champion.

After winning £1,000 for coming in second in a 1960 John O'Groats–Land's End walk sponsored by Billy Butlin – she lost the lead to Wendy Lewis after twisting her ankle – she had to relinquish her amateur status, though it was later restored, and she resumed competing. During the 1980s, she coached Birchfield Harriers' girls' teams.

At the age of 71, she broke the over-70s age group world record for the 3000-metres walk.

Randle was Honorary General Secretary of the Race Walking Association from 1988 to 1991, and its president from 1996 to 1998. She was subsequently made an Honorary Life Member, and was given their lifetime achievement award in 2014.

In 2009, she was elected President of the Midland Counties Athletics Association.

Randle died on 28 November 2023, at the age of 94.
