= Irmgard Schmelzer =

German long jumper (1921–2002)

Personal information
- Nationality: German
- Born: 19 June 1921 Frankfurt am Main, Hessen
- Died: 20 September 2002 (aged 81) Kassel, Hessen

Sport
- Sport: Athletics
- Event: Long jump

Achievements and titles
- Olympic finals: 1952
- Personal best: 5.94 m (1952)

Irmgard Schmelzer (née Kirchhoff; 19 June 1921 – 20 September 2002) was a German athlete. She competed in the women's long jump at the 1952 Summer Olympics, finishing in 4th place.
