= 1955 WAAA Championships =

British athletics event

- Dates: 2 July
- Host city: London
- Venue: White City Stadium
- Level: Senior
- Type: Outdoor

The 1955 WAAA Championships were the national track and field championships for women in the United Kingdom.

The event was held at White City Stadium, London, on 2 July 1955.

== Results ==
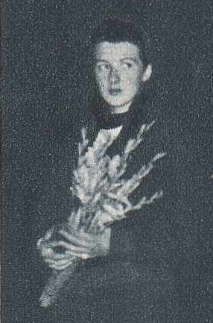
Thelma Hopkins won both the high jump and long jump titles

Event	Gold		Silver		Bronze	
100 yards	Margaret Francis	10.8w	Heather Armitage	11.0w	Shirley Hampton	11.1w
220 yards	Jean Scrivens	24.9	Shirley Hampton	25.3	Margaret Brian	25.6
440 yards	Janet Ruff	56.9	(Scotland) Anne Herman	58.4	Violet Murphy	58.4
880 yards	Diane Leather	2:09.7	Anne Dawson	2:14.9	Madeleine Wooller	2:15.0
1 mile	Phyllis Perkins	5:05.2	Leila Buckland	5:09.0	Roma Ashby	5:17.0
80 metres hurdles	Margaret Francis	11.3	Pauline Wainwright	11.4	Pamela Seaborne	11.4
High jump	(Northern Ireland) Thelma Hopkins	1.651	Dorothy Tyler	1.626	Audrey Bennett	1.600
Long jump	(Northern Ireland) Thelma Hopkins	5.76	Sheila Hoskin	5.64	Christina Cops	5.64
Shot put	Josephine Cook	11.90	Joan Balkwill	10.69	Gwen Charman	10.65
Discus throw	Maya Giri	41.68	Sylvia Needham	40.43	Gwen Charman	35.38
Javelin	Diane Coates	41.78	Anne Collins	40.62	Jacqueline Ogden	38.36
Pentathlon +	Margaret Rowley	3943	Carole Quinton	3786	Janis Long	3744
1 mile walk	Beryl Randle	7:59.4	Sheila Jennings	8:08.6	Roma Phillips	8:13.2

+ Held on 17 September at Birmingham University

== See also ==
- 1955 AAA Championships
