= Christina Persighetti =

British long jumper

Christina Persighetti née Christina Cops
Personal information
- Nationality: British (English)
- Born: 6 July 1936 Shoeburyness, Southend-on-Sea, England
- Died: 31 October 2012 (aged 76) Southend-on-Sea, England
- Height: 165 cm (5 ft 5 in)
- Weight: 59 kg (130 lb)

Sport
- Sport: Athletics
- Event: Long jump
- Club: Southend AC

May Christina Persighetti née Cops (6 July 1936 – 31 October 2012) was a British athlete who competed at the 1960 Summer Olympics.

== Biography ==
Cops finished third behind Thelma Hopkins in the long jump event at the 1955 WAAA Championships and third again behind Sheila Hoskin at the 1956 WAAA Championships.

Cops married Bernard Persighetti in the spring of 1957 and competed under her married name thereafter. She became the national long jump champion after winning the British WAAA Championships title at the 1957 WAAA Championships.

At the 1960 Olympic Games in Rome, she represented Great Britain in the women's long jump competition.

Persighetti finished second behind Mary Rand at the 1961 WAAA Championships.
