= Alf Pope (athlete) =

English athlete (1904–1985)

Personal information
- Nationality: British (English)
- Born: 24 March 1904 Islington, Middlesex, England
- Died: 1 March 1985 (aged 80) Newmarket, Suffolk, England

Sport
- Sport: Athletics
- Event: Racewalking
- Club: Woodford Green AC

Alfred Henry George Pope (24 March 1904 – 1 March 1985) was an English athlete who was a multiple British champion and one of the leading pre-World War II racewalkers in the world.

== Biography ==
Pope was a member of the Woodford Green AC.

Pope first became the British champion in 1927 after securing the 2 miles walk title at the 1927 AAA Championships. He successfully retained the title at both the 1928 AAA Championships and 1929 AAA Championships.

Pope was denied the opportunity to compete at both the Olympic Games and British Empire Games during the 1930s, due to the fact that the event was not on either of the programmes. However, at the 1931 AAA Championships, Pope not only won his fourth British title but also became the national champion for 7 miles walk by virtue of being the best placed British athlete, finishing third behind the Italian triple Olympic champion Ugo Frigerio. After competing in Latvia, Pope and Bert Cooper invited Jānis Daliņš over to England to compete.

Pope won the 7 miles walk title outright the following year at the 1932 AAA Championships but Bert Cooper then emerged as Britain's leading racewalker.

Pope was awarded an M.B.E and later in 1963, when residing at Marlhurst, Southwater, was awarded the Imperial Service Order, after working for the Commonwealth Relations Office until his retirement in 1961.

He died on 1 March 1985 in Newmarket, Suffolk.
