= Diane Leather =

British runner (1933–2018)

Diane Charles (née Leather)
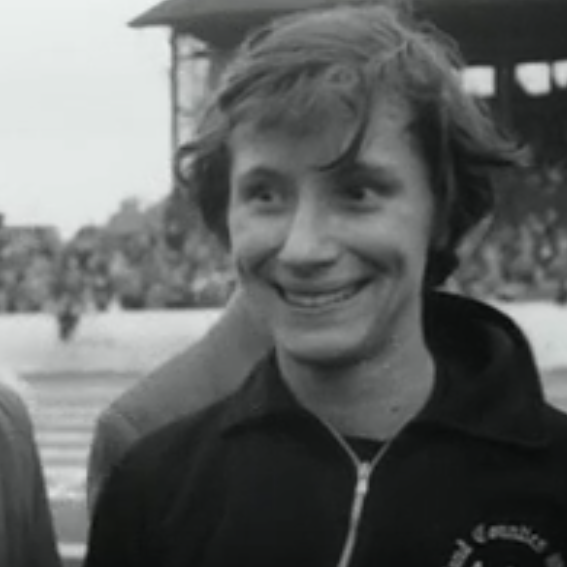
- Diane Leather in 1954

Personal information
- Born: 7 January 1933 Streetly, Staffordshire, England
- Died: 5 September 2018 (aged 85) Truro, Cornwall, England
Medal record
Women's athletics
Representing Great Britain
European Championships
Silver medal – second place	1954 Bern	800 m
Silver medal – second place	1958 Stockholm	800 m

Diane Susan Leather Charles, née Leather, (7 January 1933 – 5 September 2018) was an English athlete who was the first woman to run a sub-5-minute mile.

Inspired to take up running aged 19 after watching the 1952 Olympic Games, within months Leather had become national cross-country champion, a title she would go on to win four times.

On the track, she first came to prominence as part of a team that broke the world record for the 3 x 880 yd (800 m) relay. Then on only her second attempt at running the mile, she broke the world record. The following year, having lost the record to Romanian athlete Edith Treybal, she reclaimed the record in a time of 5:00.2, then in the same week lowered it to 4:59.6, the first woman ever to break five minutes. Leather broke the record five times in total, taking it to 4:45 by the end of 1955, a mark which stood until 1962. During her career Leather also achieved world bests at 800 metres, 880 yards and 1500 metres.

Leather's record in major championships was hampered by the lack of events available to women. There were no women's events over 200 m in the Olympic Games between 1928 and 1960, and the 1500 m was not introduced to the women's programme until 1972. Leather represented Great Britain in the European Athletics Championships in 1954 and 1958. She won silver in the 800m on both occasions. By the time the 800m was introduced to the Olympics in 1960, Leather, by then known as Diane Charles through marriage, was no longer British number one, and was eliminated in the heats.

After retiring from running aged 27, Leather Charles moved to Cornwall, where she worked in social care, and lived there for the rest of her life. She died in September 2018, following a stroke.

== Early life ==
Leather was born in Streetly, Staffordshire. She was one of six children, and the only daughter, of Mabel (née Barringer) and James Leather, a surgeon. She played lacrosse as a child, and watching the 1952 Summer Olympics sparked her interest in athletics. While studying chemistry at the Birmingham College of Technology, in October 1952 she joined the Birchfield Harriers athletics club in Birmingham and was coached by Doris Nelson Neal. She later worked as an analytical chemist at the University of Birmingham. As was customary for the era, Leather ran as an unpaid amateur, commenting in a 2014 interview that "We were all amateurs. There was no money involved until a decade or so later".

Running was initially a way for her to maintain her fitness for playing hockey.

== Athletic career ==
=== Early career to mile record ===
Leather was coached by Dorette Neal, a long-serving secretary of the Midland Counties WAAA. Neal saw that Leather had the potential to perform well in longer races, however at the time the longest recognised event in women's athletics was the 200-metre race. This limit had been adopted after false media reports that six women collapsed at the finish line in an 800-metre race at the 1928 Olympics.

Leather's maiden cross-country season was an immediate success. She went into the 1953 national championships having won every race she had entered, including the national junior cross-country title, and the Midland Championships. The nationals were held over two and a half miles at Woodgate Valley Country Park outside Birmingham. Leather led from start to finish, and won by a 76-second margin, making her national champion not long after turning 20, having only taken up the sport a few months before. Her club Birchfield Harriers won the team prize with ease, all four of their scoring runners finishing in the top twenty.

In the track season, Leather collected regional titles at 880 yards (Staffordshire), and 800 metres (Midlands). At national level, she placed third behind Anne Oliver over 880 yards at the 1953 WAAA Championships. Leather gained a niche world record in August 1953. In a Great Britain v France meeting at White City, Leather anchored Great Britain "B" in a 3 x 880 yard relay. Leather maintained a lead over Great Britain "A" throughout her leg to bring her team home in a world record 6 minutes 49 seconds. The same teams contested a rematch in September, but on this occasion Leather was unable to overhaul individual world record holder Valerie Winn in the home straight, with both teams falling short of the record.

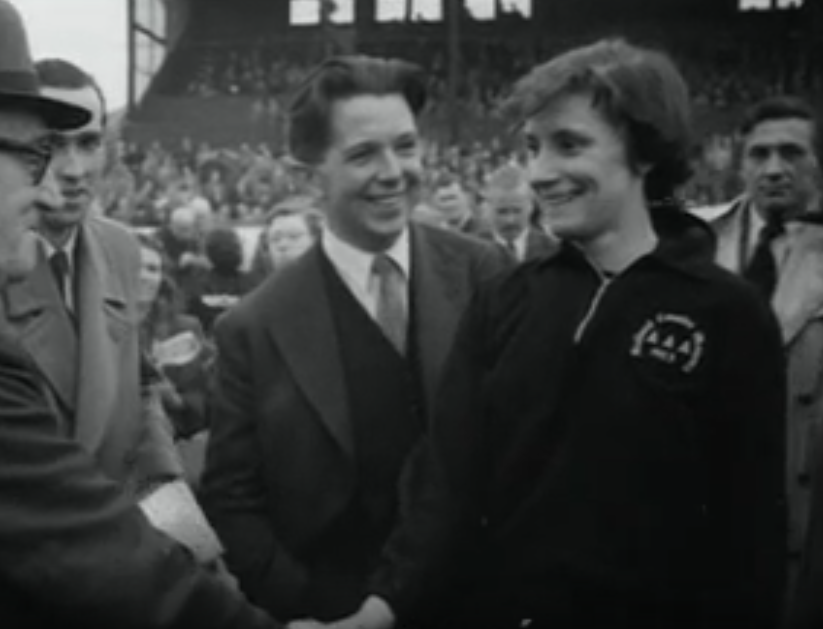
Diane Leather's run in Birmingham in May 1954 was reported by Pathe News

Also in September 1953, shortly after fellow Briton Anne Oliver set a world's best for the mile of 5:08, Leather tackled the distance, for only the second time. Taking the lead just before passing halfway in 2:37.8, Leather upped the pace to move well ahead of the field and gain the world best with 5:02.6, eight seconds clear of Enid Harding. Her achievement was labelled a "world best" rather than a "world record" because the International Amateur Athletics Federation (IAAF) did not officially recognise the distance for women until 1967. The nature of the race, with the second half much quicker than the first, led the Athletics Weekly correspondent to write "it seems obvious that this girl could beat five minutes for the distance if she had any real opposition". Leather only held the world mark until November, when Edith Treybal posted a time of 5:00.3.

Leather had a strong cross-country season in 1954. She retained her Midland title, took an emphatic victory in the English national championship at Aylesbury, and took first place in an England v Scotland international meeting at Perry Barr.

An April 1954 Athletics Weekly interview gave some insight into Leather's training schedule. In summer she trained three times a week plus races on Saturday, or four times a week in winter, with a duration of up to about hour in summer, or half an hour in winter. A typical winter training session would be warm up exercises followed by a two to three mile run.

Carrying her form into the track season, Leather made an attempt at the mile record at a Birchfield Harriers hosted meeting on 26 May 1954. Leading the race throughout, Leather was behind record pace for the first three laps, but ran the last lap in 71.6 seconds to record a world best of 5:00.2, nearly 36 seconds clear of the field and a tenth of a second under Treybal's record. Three days later Leather competed in the Midlands Women's AAA Championships at Birmingham's Alexander Sports Ground. In the 800 m, Leather battled for position with Loakes of Kettering until pulling clear with 200 m to go, and set a British all-comers record of 2:14.1. Having secured the 800 m win, Leather decided to "have a go" at the mile race, which took place less than an hour later. Leather broke the 5-minute mile barrier with a time of 4 minutes and 59.6 seconds. The record came despite a very uneven pace; her second lap was nearly ten seconds slower than her first; unlike attempts at the men's record from the era, Leather's record was achieved without the aid of pacers. Coincidentally, it was only 23 days since Roger Bannister had become the first man to run a sub 4-minute mile, 100 km away. The five minute mile feat garnered relatively little attention; at the time the Women's Amateur Athletic Association (WAAA) had a rule prohibiting publicity pictures for their athletes, an approach advocated by Leather's coach Dorette Nelson Neal. According to the Daily Mirror, Leather's reaction to breaking the record was to say "Thank goodness that's over. Now I can concentrate on my chemistry exams". On 19 June 1954, she broke the world record in winning the national 880 yards title at the 1954 WAAA Championships.

=== International athlete ===
The idiosyncrasies of which performances were counted as world records by the IAAF meant only one of Leather's records gained official recognition during her career. When Leather set a new best of 2:09.0 for 880 yards (804.67 metres) on 21 June 1954, it was recognised as an 800-metre world record despite being set on a longer course.

In July 1954 a Leather-anchored England and Wales team again broke the world record for the 3 x 880 yard relay, clocking 6:46 in an England and Wales vs Scotland and Ireland competition. However, the record lasted only four days until it was broken by Hungary in 6:36.2.

Leather was selected in the Great Britain team for the 1954 European Championships in Bern, to compete in the 800 metres. Though Leather had great prowess at longer distances, this was not an option; 800 metres was the longest distance event in the women's programme. Leather came through her heat in second place, a tenth of a second behind Soviet Lyudmila Lysenko in 2:08.9. In the final, Leather initially hung back to avoid jostling in the early stages. An opening lap of 66 seconds left her with too much work to do to have a chance of catching Nina Otkalenko, but she came through the field to claim silver in 2:09.8, one second behind the Soviet.

Further international competition came in October in the form of matches for the Great Britain women's team against Hungary in Budapest, and Czechoslovakia in Ostrava, held back to back in the same week. Leather won the 800 m in both, despite border and transport delays meaning the team did not arrive in Ostrava until 1:30 a.m. on the day of competition. She also formed part of a 3 x 800 m (2,600 ft) relay team that, though defeated by Hungary, set a British record.

Another international match at White City billed as "London v Moscow" saw Leather go up against two of her foes from the European Championship final, Lysenko and Otkalenko, in the 880 yd (800 m). Leather passed leader Lysenko on the final bend, only to see Otkalenko pass them both on the home straight, for a repeat of the result in Bern.

Third consecutive Midland and National cross-country titles were secured in the 1955 season. The nationals were held in Leeds, on a snow-covered 2.5 mi (4.0 km) course. On this occasion, Leather's winning margin was 30 seconds. A fortnight later, Leather added an easy win in the England v Scotland international.

In May 1955, Leather further improved her mile world record to 4:50.8, in a race where the top three all broke 5 minutes. She entered four events in the Midland Championships, winning the 440 yd (400 m), 880 yd (800 m) and 1 mile (1,600 m), and won her second 880 yd (800 m) national title in 2:09.7, just outside the world record, at the 1955 WAAA Championships.

In September 1955, Leather broke the 1 mi (1,600 m) record by a further 5 seconds, achieving her personal best of 4:45. Every single lap time of her race was inside record pace, so it was apparent to the crowd that a landmark time was about to be obtained. The fifth world best Leather had set at the distance, her 4:45 remained the world record for seven years until New Zealand's Marise Chamberlain ran 4:41.4 in 1962.

The 1956 Midland Cross-Country Championships saw Leather win a record equalling fourth consecutive title, though the race was closer than her previous victories, as Coventry Godiva's Roma Ashby was only five seconds back. She also took a fourth consecutive title in the following month's national championships at Sutton Coldfield, by a 50-yard margin from 1952 winner Phyllis Perkins.

Leather's 1956 track season was disrupted by illness and injury. She won the WAAA mile title, but only required a time of 5:01 to do so.

Leather won a fifth Midland Cross-Country title in 1957, pulling away from Roma Ashby in the final 400m to win by seven seconds. However, her reign in the national championship was brought to an end, as she finished third behind June Bridgland and Ashby.

In an event at Hornchurch in May 1957, Leather set a new world best of 4:30.0 for 1500 m, more than five seconds quicker than the previous record set by Phyllis Perkins. At the 1957 AAA Championships, Leather became national champion at both 880 yards and the mile. This double of middle-distance events went unmatched by any woman for 39 years, until Kelly Holmes won the 800 m and 1500 m in 1996. The same year, Leather also set a world's best at 1500 m, in 4 minutes 30 seconds. In August, at a Great Britain v USSR international match, Leather beat Yelizaveta Yermolayeva and Nina Otkalenko in the 800m, setting a new British record of 2:06.8. This time put her fifth on the all-time list, the fastest by any runner from outside the Soviet Union.

At the 1958 European Athletics Championships in Stockholm, Leather won her heat, coming through on the final straight to finish 0.2 seconds ahead of Dzidra Levitska of the Soviet Union in 2:09.8, making her the fastest qualifier.

In the final the Soviet trio of Levitska, Yelizaveta Yermolayeva and Vera Mukhanova took control of the race. At the bell lap, Leather was in last place. She came through the field, passing Levitska on the line to win silver, 0.3 seconds behind Yermolayeva in 2:06.6.

Leather was also a two-time winner of the women's race at the International Cross Country Championships in 1954 and 1955, and won the national cross country women's title four times.

=== Later career ===
In Autumn 1958, Leather moved to London. Having previously trained exclusively with Birchfield Harriers, she joined London Olympiades AC, which had formed in 1921 as the first women-only Athletics club in the country.

The 1959 National Cross-Country Championships were held in adverse weather conditions. Leather led for the first 1.5 mi (2,400 m), but faded in the second half and came in sixth, 40 seconds behind winner Joyce Byatt. By this time Leather was no longer dominant on the domestic track scene. Over the 1959 season she was beaten over 880 yd (800 m) several times by Joy Jordan, and finished fourth in the WAAA Championships.

She married Peter Charles, an industrial engineer turned financial consultant whom she first met as a student, in 1959. In the 1960 Women's A.A.A. Championships, Diane Charles placed third in the 880 yards, one and a half seconds behind winner Joy Jordan, and second in the mile, four seconds down on Roma Ashby. Charles competed in her final competition, the 1960 Summer Olympics in Rome, where the women's 800 m was contested for the first time since 1928. She captained the Great Britain women's team, but was eliminated in the heats of the 800 metres, in 2:14.24. She held the British record for the 1500 m for 11 years and held the world best in the mile for 8 years in total.

After Diane's competitive career was over, the Charles family maintained links with the sport. Diane looked after the infant child of long jump world record holder Mary Rand while Rand was away at the 1964 Tokyo Olympics. Her husband Peter later gave financial advice and assistance to Daley Thompson ahead of his first Olympic Games in 1980.

Leather's achievements have gained more recognition in recent years. A trophy at the Westminster Mile race is named after her.

== Personal life ==
Charles retired from athletics at the age of 27 and had her first child the following year. After gaining a social work diploma, she lived in Cornwall for the remainder of her life. She worked for child protection agencies, fostered children and was a volunteer for Cruse Bereavement Care and Samaritans. She was married for more than 55 years—her husband died in 2017—and had four children and 13 grandchildren. She died on 5 September 2018, aged 85, in Truro, Cornwall. She had recently suffered a stroke. Among the mourners to pay their respects at Penmount Crematorium in Truro were double Olympic decathlon champion Daley Thompson, and karate world champion Geoff Thompson.

Charles' great-niece, Ellie Leather, also ran under 5 minutes for the mile shortly before Charles' death. She became a professional miler in 2022, and ran her best time of 4:25.23 seconds in 2024. She suggested a singlet number of 29 for herself because 29 May 1954 was the day that her great-aunt first ran under 5 minutes.

Records
Preceded by Anne Oliver	Women's mile world record holder 30 September 1953 – 1 November 1953; 26 May 1954 – 8 December 1962	Succeeded by Edith Treybal
Preceded by Edith Treybal	Women's mile world record holder 30 September 1953 – 1 November 1953; 26 May 1954 – 8 December 1962	Succeeded by Marise Chamberlain
