= Éliane Dudal =

French long jumper (1926–2022)

Personal information
- Nationality: French
- Born: 6 May 1926 Argenteuil, France
- Died: 6 January 2022 (aged 95) Neuville-sur-Oise, France

Sport
- Sport: Athletics
- Event: Long jump

Éliane Dudal (6 May 1926 – 6 January 2022) was a French athlete. She competed in the women's long jump at the 1952 Summer Olympics.
