= Bärbel Mayer =

German sprinter (born 1935)

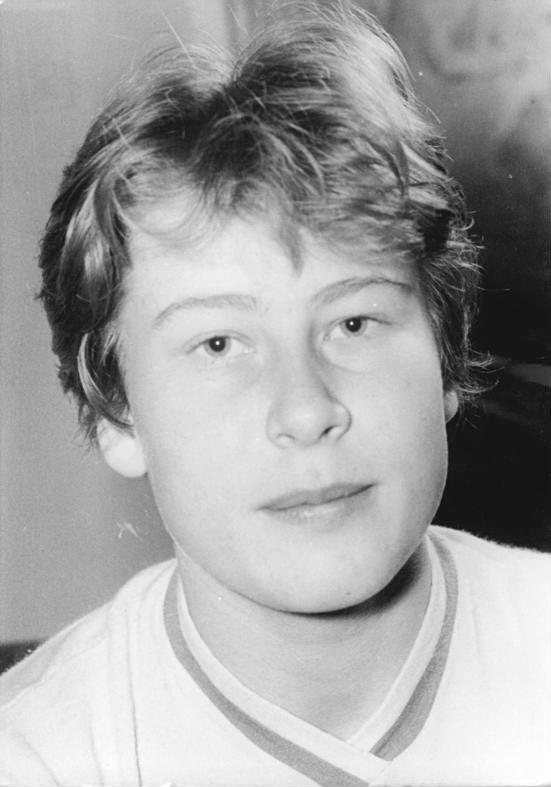
- Mayer in 1956

Personal information
- Full name: Barbara Mayer
- Nationality: German
- Born: 14 March 1935 (age 90)

Sport
- Sport: Sprinting
- Event: 4 × 100 metres relay

Barbara "Bärbel" Mayer (born 14 March 1935) is a German sprinter. She competed in the women's 4 × 100 metres relay at the 1956 Summer Olympics.
