= Sylvia Needham =

British discus thrower

Personal information
- Nationality: British (English)
- Born: 28 March 1935 (age 90) London, England

Sport
- Sport: Athletics
- Event: Discus
- Club: Spartan LAC

Sylvia J Needham (born 28 March 1935) is a female former athlete who competed for England.

== Biography ==
Needham finished third behind Maya Giri in the discus throw event at the 1954 WAAA Championships, improving to second behind the same athlete the following year at the 1955 WAAA Championships. Needham was unfortunate to then meet Suzanne Allday in competition because she denied Needham on several occasions for the national title, although Needham did claim the WAAA discus title at the 1957 WAAA Championships.

She represented England in the discus at the 1958 British Empire and Commonwealth Games in Cardiff, Wales.
