= Elfriede von Nitzsch =

German long jumper

Personal information
- Nationality: German
- Born: 26 January 1920
- Died: 29 October 2011 (aged 91)

Sport
- Sport: Athletics
- Event: Long jump

Elfriede von Nitzsch (26 January 1920 – 29 October 2011) was a German athlete. She competed in the women's long jump at the 1952 Summer Olympics.
