= Ryszard Mańko =

Polish footballer

Personal information
- Date of birth: 8 April 1946
- Date of death: 11 February 1994 (aged 47)
- Place of death: Hamilton, Ontario, Canada
- Position: Forward

Senior career*
Years	Team	Apps	(Gls)
- Arkonia Szczecin
- Pogoń Szczecin

International career
1970	Poland	1	(0)
- * Club domestic league appearances and goals

Ryszard Mańko (8 April 1946 – 11 February 1994) was a Polish footballer who played as a forward.

Mańko played in one match for the Poland national team in 1970.

He was shot and killed by a robber while working at a pizzeria in Hamilton, Canada on 11 February 1994, at the age of 47.
