= Maria Musso =

Italian athlete (1931–2024)

Personal information
- Nationality: Italian
- Born: 14 September 1931 Turin, Italy
- Died: 31 January 2024 (aged 92) Turin, Italy

Sport
- Country: Italy
- Sport: Athletics
- Event(s): Sprint; Pentathlon
- Club: Atalanta Torino

Achievements and titles
- Personal bests: 100 m: 12.1 (1955); 80 m hs: 11.5 (1957); Pentathlon: 4003 pt (1954)
Medal record
Women's athletics
Representing Italy
European Championships
Bronze medal – third place	1954 Bern	4×100 m

Maria Musso (14 September 1931 – 31 January 2024) was an Italian sprinter and pentathlete.

== Biography ==
Musso was born in Turin on 14 September 1931. She participated twice in the Summer Olympics (1952 and 1956) and had 29 caps with the national team from 1949 to 1960. Musso died on 31 January 2024, at the age of 92.

== Achievements ==
Year	Competition	Venue	Position	Event	Performance	Notes
1954	European Championships	(Switzerland) Bern	3rd	4 × 100 m relay	46.6	
1956	Olympic Games	(Australia) Melbourne	5th	4 × 100 m relay	45.7	

== National titles ==
Musso won the individual national championship six times.

- 2 wins in 80 metres hurdles (1950, 1957)
- 1 win in Long jump (1954)
- 3 wins in Pentathlon (1953, 1957, 1959)

== See also ==
- Italy national relay team - All the medals
