= Jack Streader =

Australian rules footballer

Personal information
- Full name: Jack Streader
- Born: 13 May 1927
- Died: 2 February 1994 (aged 66)
- Original team: Fairfield
- Height: 183 cm (6 ft 0 in)
- Weight: 92 kg (203 lb)
- Position: Half forward / Follower

Playing career^{1}
Years	Club	Games (Goals)
1949–55	Fitzroy	69 (45)
- ^{1} Playing statistics correct to the end of 1955.

Jack Streader (13 May 1927 – 2 February 1994) was a former Australian rules footballer who played with Fitzroy in the Victorian Football League (VFL).
