= Irina Turova =

Soviet sprinter

Personal information
- Born: 14 May 1935 Leningrad, Russian SFSR, USSR
- Died: 8 February 2012 (aged 76) Moscow, Russia

Sport
- Country: Soviet Union
- Sport: Track and field
- Events: Sprint, long jump
- Club: Dynamo Moscow

Achievements and titles
- Personal bests: 100 m – 11.6 (1954); 200 m – 24.2 (1956); LJ – 6.00 m (1956)
Medal record
Women's athletics
Representing the Soviet Union
European Championships
Gold medal – first place	1954 Bern	100 m
Gold medal – first place	1954 Bern	4×100 m
Silver medal – second place	1954 Bern	200 m

Irina Robertovna Turova (later Bochkaryova and Mordovtseva, Russian: Ирина Робертовна Турова-Бочкарёва; 14 May 1935 – 8 February 2012) was a Soviet sprinter. She placed fourth in the 4 × 100 m relay at the 1952 and 1956 Summer Olympics and won two gold and one silver medal at the 1954 European Athletics Championships.

Turova was coached by her parents, who competed nationally in various track events, including sprint. Her son Pyotr Bochkaryov became an Olympic pole vaulter.
