= Shirley Hampton =

English sprinter (born 1935)

Personal information
- Nationality: British (English)
- Born: 15 September 1935 (age 91)

Sport
- Sport: Athletics
- Event: Sprinting
- Club: Orpington LAC; Phoenix AC
Medal record
Women's athletics
Representing Great Britain
European Championships
Bronze medal – third place	1954 Bern	200 m
Representing England
British Empire & Commonwealth Games
Silver medal – second place	1954 Vancouver	4×110 yards
Bronze medal – third place	1954 Vancouver	220 yards

Shirley Hampton married name Shirley Pirie (born 15 September 1935) is a former athlete who competed for England.

== Early life ==
Hampton originated from Orpington. Her father was Harold and she attended Woolwich Polytechnic.

== Athletics career ==
Hampton finished second behind Sylvia Cheeseman in the 220 yards event at the 1952 WAAA Championships. After finished second behind Ann Johnson in the 220 yards event at the 1952 WAAA Championships, she represented England and won a silver medal in the 4 × 110 yards relay and a bronze medal in the 220 yards at the 1954 British Empire and Commonwealth Games in Vancouver, Canada.

Other achievements in 1954 included winning a bronze medal at the European Athletics Championships in Bern. In 1955, she finished second and third respectively in the sprints at the 1955 WAAA Championships.

Hampton finished third behind June Paul in the 220 yards event at the 1956 WAAA Championships and then broke the world record with a time of 56.4 when she won the 1958 WAAA Championships.

== Personal life ==
She married the English Olympic silver medallist long-distance runner and coach Gordon Pirie on 24 September 1956 at Caxton Hall and became Shirley Pirie. There were two daughters of the marriage, Joanne and Sara. The couple separated in 1978.
