= Jack Lugg =

Australian rules footballer

Personal information
- Full name: John Charles Lugg
- Born: 3 December 1919; South Melbourne, Victoria
- Died: 8 February 1994 (aged 74)
- Original team: Army / Boundary Rovers
- Height: 185 cm (6 ft 1 in)
- Weight: 83 kg (183 lb)

Playing career^{1}
Years	Club	Games (Goals)
1946	South Melbourne	2 (0)
- ^{1} Playing statistics correct to the end of 1946.

John Charles Lugg (3 December 1919 – 8 February 1994) was an Australian rules footballer who played with South Melbourne in the Victorian Football League (VFL).
