= Roland Hardy =

British racewalker

Personal information
- Nationality: British (English)
- Born: 11 June 1926 Sheepbridge, Derbyshire, England
- Died: 14 June 2016 (aged 90) Chesterfield, Derbyshire, England
- Height: 176 cm (5 ft 9 in)
- Weight: 64 kg (141 lb)

Sport
- Sport: Athletics
- Event: Racewalking
- Club: Sheffield United Harriers

Roland Hardy (11 June 1926 – 14 June 2016) was a British racewalker who competed in the 1952 Summer Olympics and in the 1956 Summer Olympics. He was born in Sheepbridge, Derbyshire. Hardy was a five-time national champion in the 7 miles walk and a two-time national champion in the 2 miles walk.

== Biography ==
Hardy was born in Sheepbridge, Derbyshire, in June 1926. At school, Hardy took part in both cricket and football. In the latter, he was noticed by Sheffield United's manager Teddy Davison, who signed him to play for the side. However, Hardy's National service stopped him from taking up a career in football. In April 1949, Hardy began to take up race walking, where he joined the Sheffield United Harriers. Later that year, Hardy won the 1949 Sheffield Star Walk, breaking the course record by 53 seconds.

Hardy became the British 7 miles walk champion after winning the British AAA Championships title at the 1950 AAA Championships and successfully retained his title for the next three years in 1951, 1952 and 1953.

In August 1951, Hardy set a new world record in the 5-mile walk, beating the previous time by nine seconds, and then broke the British 7-mile record one year later. With this form, Hardy was selected to represent Great Britain at the Olympics.

Hardy competed at two Olympic Games. At the 1952 Summer Olympics in Helsinki, Hardy took part in the men's 10 kilometres walk, but was disqualified in his heat. Four years later, at the 1956 Summer Olympics in Melbourne, he finished in eighth place in the men's 20 kilometres walk.

He died in June 2016, in Chesterfield, Derbyshire, at the age of 90.
