= Doris Nelson Neal =

British athletics coach (1908–1982)

Dorothy (Dorette) Nelson Neal
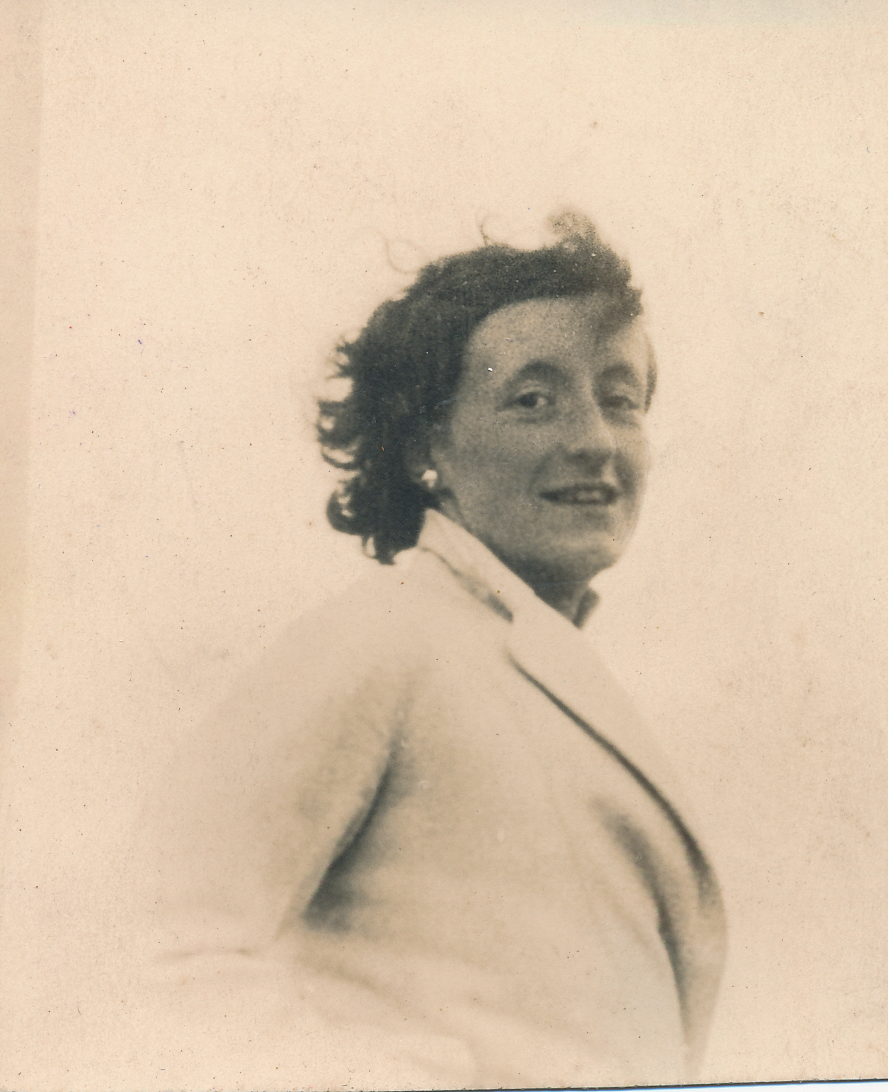
- Born: 1908
- Died: 1982 (aged 73–74)
- Occupation: athletics coach

Dorothy Nelson Neal OBE (1908–1982) was influential in the early days of women's athletics in Great Britain.

Neal was a member of Birchfield Harriers athletics club for 53 years.

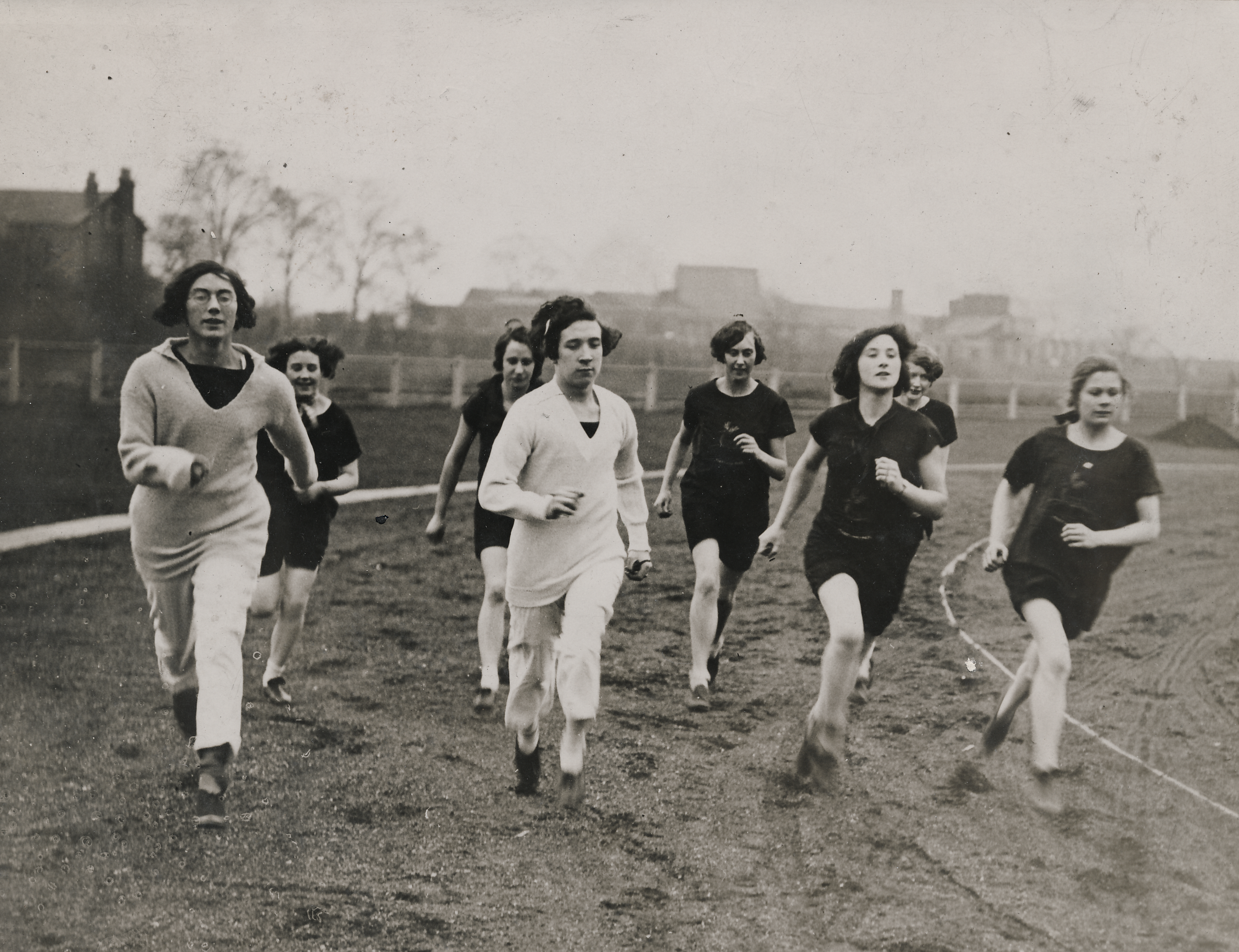
Birchfield Harriers Ladies training at Perry Barr in 1929

She competed as an athlete before taking up coaching and is recognised as the first female to coach a female athlete to a World Record, having been the coach of Diane Leather when she became the first women to run the mile in under five minutes.

Neal was an official at the 1948 Summer Olympics in London.

She was awarded the OBE for services to athletics, and a stand at Alexander Stadium is named after her.
