= Bill Ewing (footballer) =

Australian rules footballer

Personal information
- Full name: Bill Ewing
- Born: 28 May 1909
- Died: 12 February 1994 (aged 84)
- Original team: South Bendigo
- Height: 191 cm (6 ft 3 in)
- Weight: 88 kg (194 lb)

Playing career^{1}
Years	Club	Games (Goals)
1933	Essendon	5 (3)
- ^{1} Playing statistics correct to the end of 1933.

Bill Ewing (28 May 1909 – 12 February 1994) was an Australian rules footballer who played with Essendon in the Victorian Football League (VFL).
