= 1952 Olympics =

1952 Olympics refers to both:

- The 1952 Winter Olympics, which were held in Oslo, Norway
- The 1952 Summer Olympics, which were held in Helsinki, Finland
