= Liesel Jakobi =

Medal record

Women's athletics

Representing West Germany

European Championships
Gold medal – first place	1958 Stockholm	Long jump

Elisabeth "Liesel" Jakobi, married surname Luxenburger (née Jakobi; born 28 February 1939) is a German former track and field athlete who competed in the long jump for West Germany.

Born in Saarbrücken, she took up athletics and began training with the local club, ATSV Saarbrücken. She reached the peak of continental competition at the age of nineteen by winning the gold medal in the long jump at the 1958 European Athletics Championships in Stockholm. Her winning mark of 6.14 m (20 ft 1 1/2 in) was a championship record by ten centimetres (improving the four-year-old record of Britain's Jean Desforges).

At national level that year she only placed third in the long jump at the West German Athletics Championships. Over her career she was a national runner-up once (1959) and twice more a third-place finisher (1960 and 1963), but she never won the West German title. She was, however, twice a national sprint champion indoors over 60 metres, winning that title first in 1960 and again in 1963. She stopped competing at a high level shortly after getting married.

== See also ==
- List of European Athletics Championships medalists (women)
