= Laurie Tetley =

Australian rules footballer

Personal information
- Full name: Laurie Tetley
- Born: 3 September 1921
- Died: 10 February 1994 (aged 72)
- Original team: East Fremantle
- Height: 179 cm (5 ft 10 in)
- Weight: 72 kg (159 lb)

Playing career^{1}
Years	Club	Games (Goals)
1942	South Melbourne	1 (0)
- ^{1} Playing statistics correct to the end of 1942.

Laurie Tetley (3 September 1921 – 10 February 1994) was an Australian rules footballer who played with South Melbourne in the Victorian Football League (VFL).
