= Noel Alsop =

Australian rules footballer, born 1914

Personal information
- Full name: Noel George Alsop
- Born: 24 December 1914; Lorne, Victoria, Australia
- Died: 25 February 1994 (aged 79)
- Original team: Lorne
- Height: 178 cm (5 ft 10 in)
- Weight: 70 kg (154 lb)

Playing career^{1}
Years	Club	Games (Goals)
1937–38	Footscray	7 (4)
- ^{1} Playing statistics correct to the end of 1938.

Noel George Alsop (24 December 1914 – 25 February 1994) was an Australian rules footballer who played with Footscray in the Victorian Football League (VFL).
