= Averil Williams =

British athlete (1935–2019)

Personal information
- Nationality: British (English/Welsh)
- Born: 19 March 1935 Essex, England
- Died: 16 December 2019 (aged 84)
- Height: 171 cm (5 ft 7 in)
- Weight: 69 kg (152 lb)

Sport
- Sport: Athletics
- Event: Javelin throw
- Club: Lozells Harriers; Blue Coat AC (Hereford)
Medal record
Athletics
Representing England
British Empire & Commonwealth Games
| Bronze medal – third place | 1958 Cardiff | javelin |

Averil Muriel Williams (19 March 1935 – 16 December 2019) was a British athlete who competed at the 1960 Summer Olympics.

== Biography ==
Williams finished third behind Doris Orphall in the javelin throw event at the 1956 WAAA Championships. The following year she became the national javelin champion after winning the British WAAA Championships title at the 1957 WAAA Championships and successfully retained the title at the 1958 WAAA Championships.

One month later, Williams represented England and won a bronze medal in the javelin at the 1958 British Empire and Commonwealth Games in Cardiff, Wales.

After finishing second behind Sue Platt at the 1960 WAAA Championships she represented Great Britain at the 1960 Olympic Games in Rome, competing in the women's javelin throw competition.

Williams continued to compete for several years and finished second behind Ameli Koloska in the javelin event at the 1965 WAAA Championships and third behind Sue Platt at the 1969 WAAA Championships.

In 1970 she competed for Wales at the 1970 British Commonwealth Games in Edinburgh.
