= Aida Chuyko =

Soviet long jumper

Personal information
- Nationality: Soviet
- Born: 24 November 1936 (age 89)

Sport
- Sport: Athletics
- Event: Long jump

Aida Chuyko (born 24 November 1936) is a Soviet athlete. She competed in the women's long jump at the 1964 Summer Olympics.
