= Jozef Melis =

Belgian footballer

Personal information
- Date of birth: 28 August 1919
- Date of death: 28 February 1994 (aged 74)

International career
Years	Team	Apps	(Gls)
1946	Belgium	1	(0)

Jozef Melis (28 August 1919 – 28 February 1994) was a Belgian footballer. He played in one match for the Belgium national football team in 1946.
