= Jean Scrivens =

British sprinter

Personal information
- Nationality: British (English)
- Born: 15 October 1935 (age 90) Camberwell, London, England
- Height: 170 cm (5 ft 7 in)
- Weight: 61 kg (134 lb)

Sport
- Sport: Athletics
- Event: Sprinting
- Club: Selsonia LAC
Medal record
Representing Great Britain
Women's Athletics
Silver medal – second place	1956 Melbourne	4×100 metres relay

Jean Eileen Scrivens (born 15 October 1935) is a retired British track and field athlete, who competed in the 100 metres at the 1956 Summer Olympics.

== Biography ==
Scrivens attended Ensham School in south London, having lived on Wingford Road. She finished third behind Anne Pashley in the 100 yards event at the 1953 WAAA Championships.

Two years later, Scrivens became the national 220 yards champion after winning the British WAAA Championships title at the 1955 WAAA Championships. Scrivens was selected to compete for Great Britain for the 1956 Olympics Games, held in Melbourne, Australia, in the 4 × 100 metres relay, where she won the silver medal, behind Australia, with her teammates Anne Pashley, June Foulds and Heather Armitage.
