= Milena Greppi =

Italian hurdler and sprinter

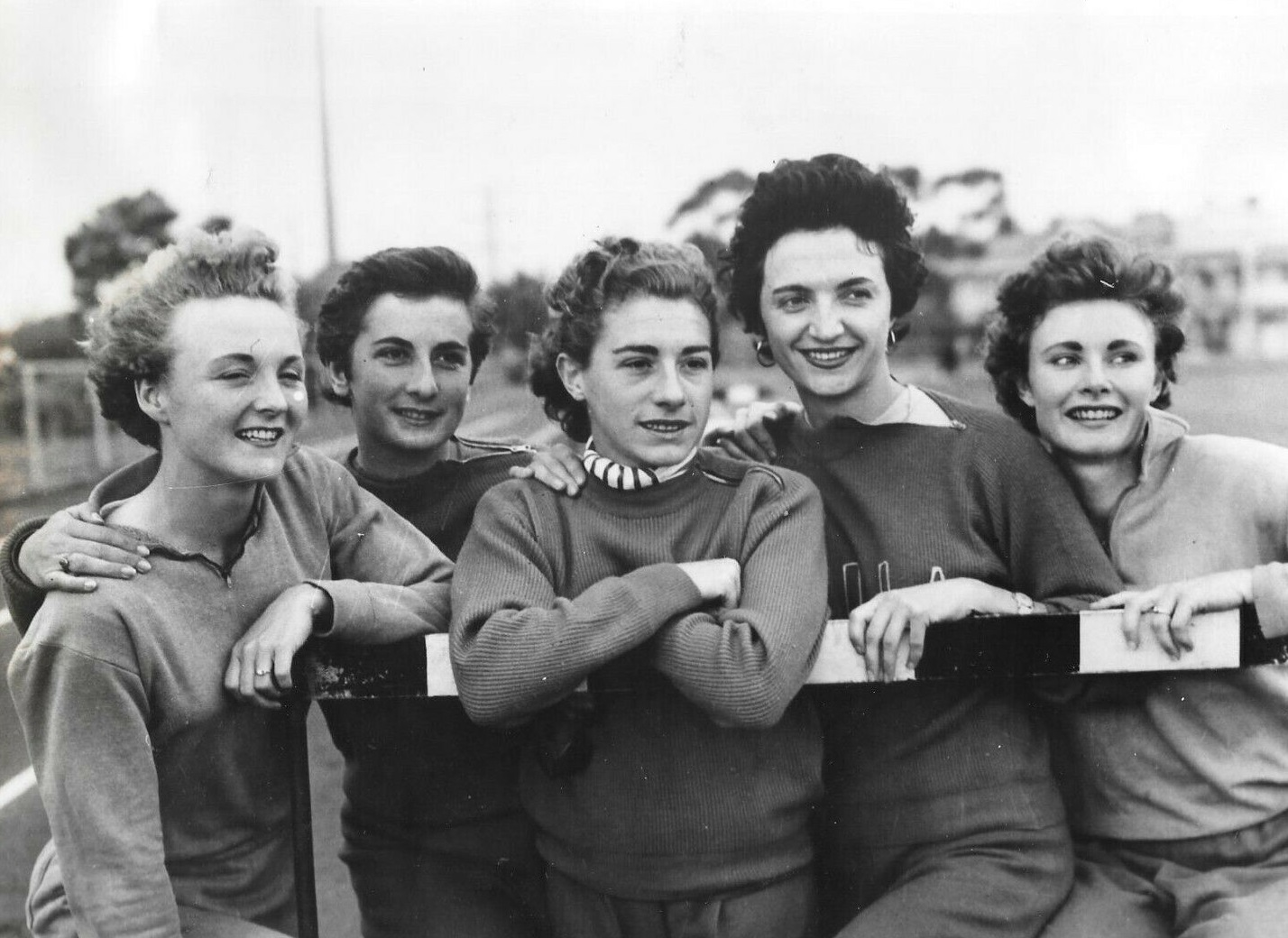
- Gloria Cooke, Franca Peggion, Milena Greppi, Maria Musso, Marlene Mathews at Royal Park, Melbourne in 1956

Personal information
- Nationality: Italian
- Born: 8 July 1929 Milan, Italy
- Died: 13 December 2016 (aged 87)

Sport
- Country: Italy
- Sport: Athletics
- Event(s): Hurdles; Sprint
- Club: SC Bergamo

Achievements and titles
- Personal bests: 100 m: 12.1 (1953); 80 m hs: 11.2 (1957)
Medal record
Women's athletics
Representing Italy
European Championships
Bronze medal – third place	1954 Bern	4×100 m

Milena Greppi (8 July 1929 – 13 December 2016) was an Italian hurdler.

== Biography ==
Milena Greppi was born in Milan into an aristocratic family. Her father was Antonio Greppi (1901–1991), 8th Count of Bussero and Corneliano and her mother was Aurora Mattei. She participated at two editions of the Summer Olympics (1952 and 1956), and had 23 caps in national team from 1951 to 1958.

== Achievements ==
Year	Competition	Venue	Position	Event	Performance	Note
1954	European Championships	(Switzerland) Bern	3rd	4 × 100 m relay	46.6	
1956	Olympic Games	(Australia) Melbourne	5th	4 × 100 m relay	45.7	

== National titles ==
Milena Greppi won five times the individual national championship.

- 7 wins on 80 metres hurdles (1952, 1953, 1954, 1955, 1956)

== See also ==
- Italy national relay team
