= Aycan Önel =

Turkish sprinter

Personal information
- Nationality: Turkish
- Born: 17 April 1933 (age 92)
- Spouse: Cahit Önel

Sport
- Sport: Sprinting
- Event: 100 metres

Aycan Önel (born 17 April 1933) is a Turkish sprinter. She competed in the women's 100 metres at the 1960 Summer Olympics.

She competed at the 1957 AAA Championships, along with Gul Ciray being the first Turkish woman ever to compete in the United Kingdom.

Önel is the wife of Cahit Önel, another Turkish athletics Olympian at the 1960 and 1964 Games.
