= Wilhelmina Lust =

Dutch athlete (1932–2026)

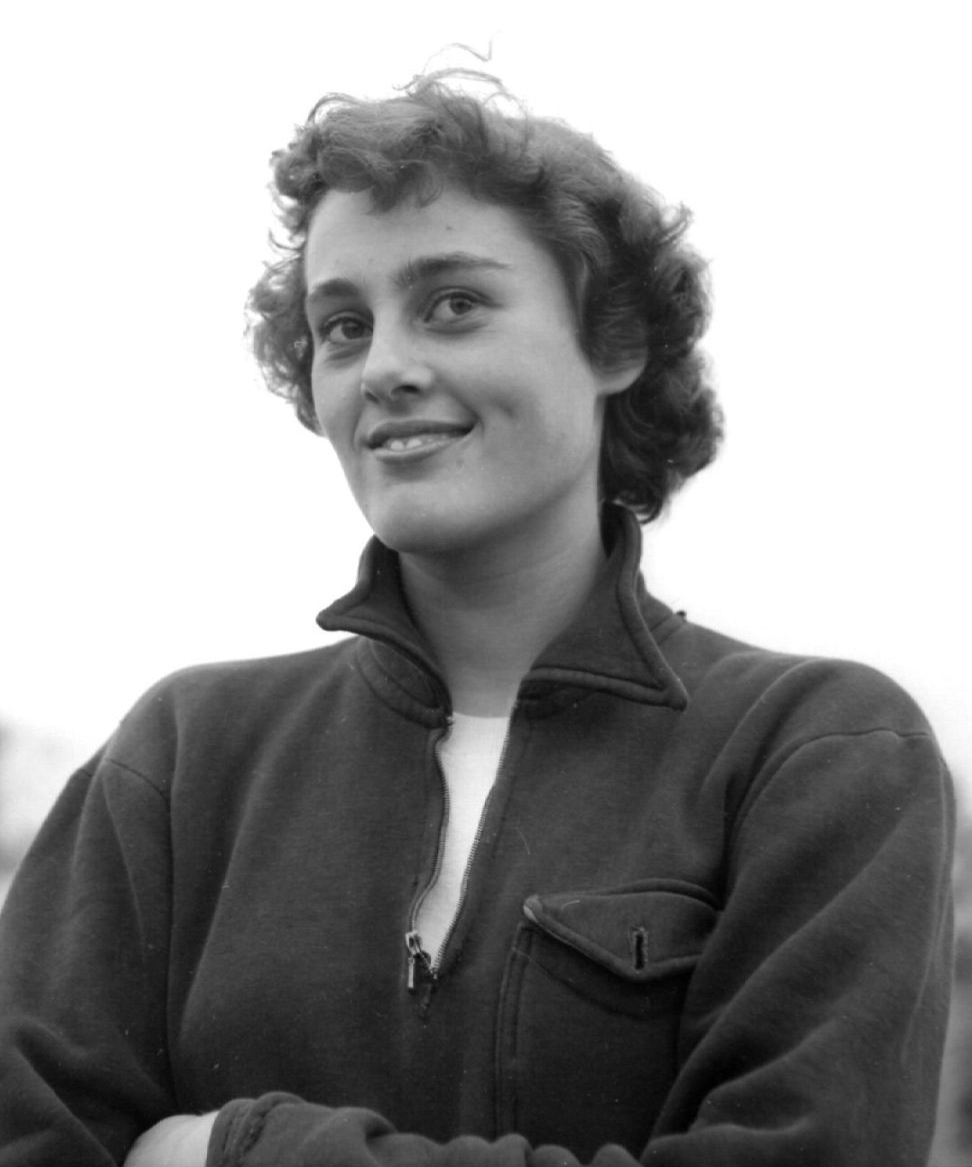
- Lust in 1951

Personal information
- Born: 19 June 1932 Zaandam, Netherlands
- Died: 5 August 2026 (aged 94) Cairns, Queensland, Australia

Sport
- Sport: Sprint, hurdles, long jump, pentathlon
- Club: Zaanland, Zaandam

Achievements and titles
- Personal bests: 80mH – 11.4 (1952); LJ – 5.81 m (1952)
Medal record
Women's athletics
Representing the Netherlands
European Championships
Silver medal – second place	1950 Brussels	Long jump

Wilhelmina Maria "Willy" "Wil" Lust (later Postma, 19 June 1932 – 5 August 2026) was a Dutch track-and-field athlete. She won a silver medal in the long jump at the 1950 European Athletics Championships. Two years later she competed at the 1952 Summer Olympics, in the 80 m hurdles, long jump and 4 × 100 m relay; she finished in fifth place in the long jump and in sixth place in the relay. She was also successful in the pentathlon, holding national records and winning two national titles in 1950 and 1951. In 1954, together with her husband she immigrated to Australia and retired from her career. She had a son and daughter.

In August 2024 it was announced Lust had been diagnosed with dementia. She died in Cairns on 5 August 2026, at the age of 94.

Awards
Preceded by Puck Brouwer	KNAU Cup; 1953	Succeeded by Janus van der Zande
