= Pierrette Glotin =

French athlete

Pierrette Glotin (26 November 1933 – 8 February 1994) was a French athlete who specialises in the long jump. Glotin competed at the 1952 Summer Olympics.
