= Bertha Brouwer =

Dutch sprinter

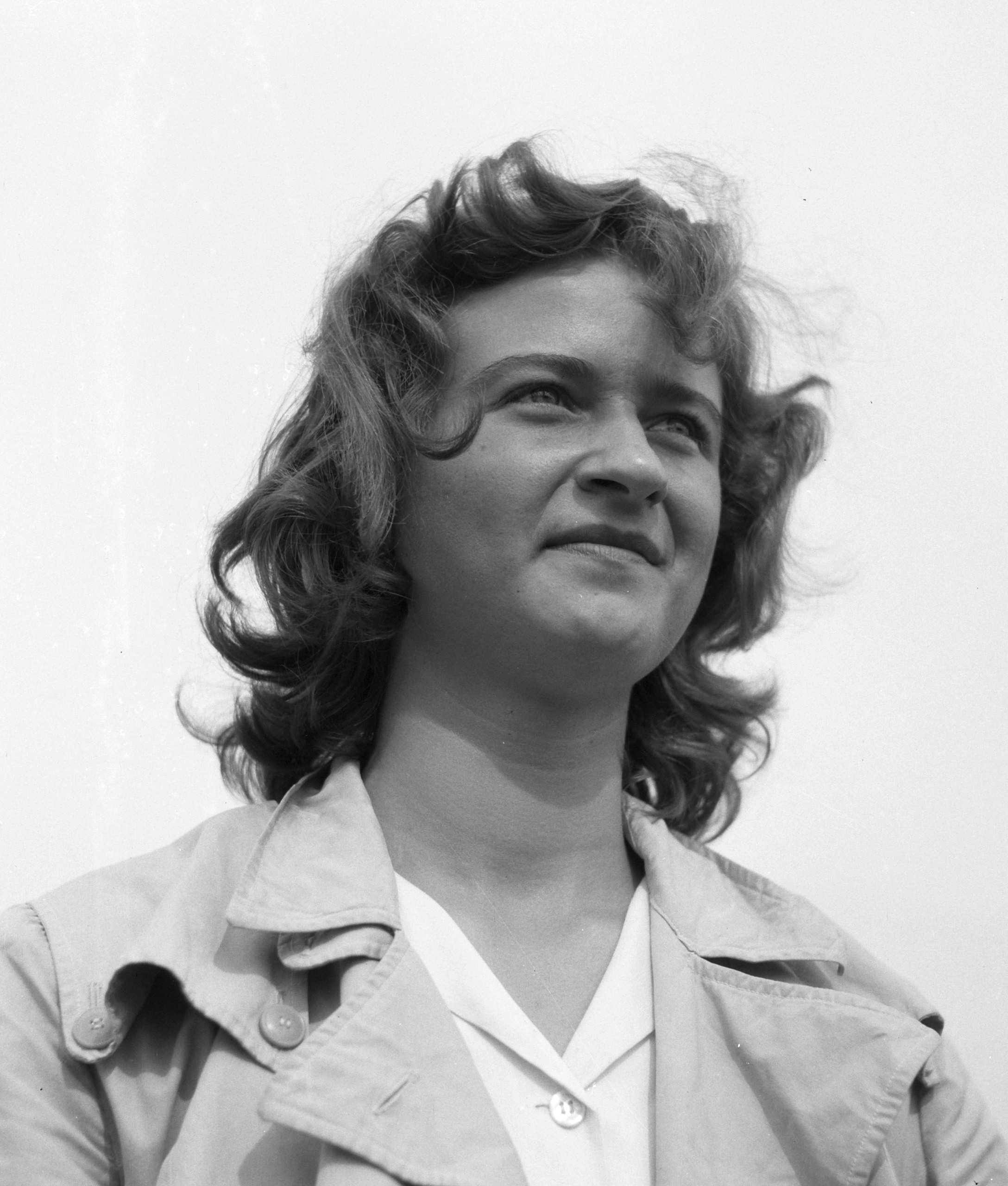
- Puck Brouwer in 1950

Personal information
- Born: 29 October 1930 Leidschendam, the Netherlands
- Died: 6 October 2006 (aged 75) Oostvoorne, the Netherlands
- Height: 1.74 m (5 ft 9 in)
- Weight: 73 kg (161 lb)

Sport
- Sport: Sprint
- Club: Celebes, Den Haag
Medal record
Men's athletics
Representing the Netherlands
Olympic Games
| Silver medal – second place | 1952 Helsinki | 200 m |
European Championships
| Silver medal – second place | 1950 Brussels | 4×100 m |
| Silver medal – second place | 1954 Bern | 100 m |

Bertha "Puck" Brouwer (later van Duyne; 29 October 1930 – 6 October 2006) was a Dutch sprinter.

Brouwer accomplished her first international notable result in 1950, when she won the silver medal at the European Championships, being part of the 4×100 metres relay team alongside Fanny Blankers-Koen. She competed at the 1952 Summer Olympics in the 100 m, 200 m and 4×100 m relay, and won a silver medal in the 200 m. A third silver medal was added in 1954, when she finished second on the 100 m at the European Championships in Bern. She also was a member of the Dutch team for the 1956 Summer Olympics; however the Dutch decided to boycott the Games, and Van Duyne, who was already in Melbourne, had to go home. Disappointed, she shortly afterwards retired from competitions.

Awards
| Preceded by Nico Lutkeveld | KNAU Cup; 1952 | Succeeded by Wil Lust |
