= Ann Johnson (athlete) =

British sprinter (born 1933)

Personal information
- Nationality: British (English)
- Born: 28 September 1933 (age 92) Elham, Kent, England
- Height: 175 cm (5 ft 9 in)
- Weight: 64 kg (141 lb)

Sport
- Sport: Athletics
- Event: Sprinting
- Club: Cambridge Harriers

Ann Elaine Johnson (born 28 September 1933) is a British sprinter who competed at the 1952 Summer Olympics.

== Biography ==
Johnson grew up in Hythe, Kent. Her father Joe was a sprinter.

Johnson finished third behind Sylvia Cheeseman in the 220 yards event at the 1952 WAAA Championships.

Shortly afterwards she represented Great Britain at the 1952 Olympic Games in Helsinki, competing in the women's 200 metres competition.

Johnson national 220 yards champion after winning the British WAAA Championships title at the 1953 WAAA Championships and successfully retained her title the following year at the 1954 WAAA Championships.

One month later she represented England in the 220 yards and long jump at the 1954 British Empire and Commonwealth Games in Vancouver, Canada.
