= Inge Eckel =

German sprinter

Personal information
- Nationality: German
- Born: 7 October 1932
- Died: 23 July 2003 (aged 70)

Sport
- Sport: Sprinting
- Event: 4 × 100 metres relay

Inge Eckel (7 October 1932 – 23 July 2003) was a German sprinter. She competed in the women's 4 × 100 metres relay at the 1952 Summer Olympics representing Saar.

== See also ==
- Saar at the 1952 Summer Olympics
