= Anne Pashley =

British sprinter and opera singer (1935 - 2016)

Personal information
- Nationality: British (English)
- Born: 5 June 1935 Skegness, England
- Died: 7 October 2016 (aged 81) Chilton, England
- Height: 162 cm (5 ft 4 in)
- Weight: 50 kg (110 lb)

Sport
- Sport: Athletics
- Event: Sprinting
- Club: Great Yarmouth
Medal record
Women's athletics
Representing Great Britain
Olympic Games
Silver medal – second place	1956 Melbourne	4×100 m
European Championships
Bronze medal – third place	1954 Berne	100 m
Representing England
British Empire & Commonwealth Games
Silver medal – second place	1954 Vancouver	4×110 y

Anne Pashley (5 June 1935 – 7 October 2016) was a British track and field sprinter, who represented Great Britain at the 1956 Summer Olympics. Following her track and field career, she made a second career as a soprano singer.

== Biography ==
Pashley was born on 5 June 1935 in Skegness, Lincolnshire, the younger of two daughters of Roy Pashley, an English teacher, and his wife Milly Pashley, who ran a holiday camp. She attended school in Great Yarmouth, where her athletic skills came to attention.

Pashley finished third behind June Foulds in the 100 metres event at the 1951 WAAA Championships. Two years later Pashley became the national 100 yards champion after winning the British WAAA Championships title at the 1953 WAAA Championships, equalling the British women's 100-yard record of 10.8 seconds.

Pashley took the bronze medal at the 1954 European Championships in Berne, Switzerland in the women's individual 100 metres, behind Irina Turova (Soviet Union) and Bertha van Duyne (Netherlands). At the 1956 Summer Olympics, she and her teammates Jean Scrivens, June Foulds and Heather Armitage won the silver medal in the women's 4 × 100 m relay. Pashley retired from athletic competition soon after the Melbourne Olympics.

Pashley them embarked on a second career as an opera singer, as a soprano. She studied at the Guildhall School of Music, and made her stage debut in 1959. She made her debut at Glyndebourne as the Second Boy in Die Zauberflöte in 1962, with her Covent Garden debut as a bridesmaid in Le nozze di Figaro in 1963 and Barbarina in the same opera the following year, going on to sing a wide range of roles at the Royal Opera House, from a Page in Lohengrin, Berta in Il barbiere di Siviglia, a niece in Peter Grimes, Amor in Orfeo ed Euridice, Karolka in Jenůfa, Ascanius in The Trojans, Emma in Khovanshchina, A Flower Maiden in Parsifal, Mercédès in Carmen, Feódor in Boris Godunov and two roles in the world premiere of We Come to the River.

She sang Siébel in Faust at Sadler's Wells in 1965, later singing Gretel with the company. She also sang for Welsh National Opera including the premiere of The Parlour, Scottish Opera, Kent Opera and the New Opera Company, with whom she participated in the first UK performance of Cardillac in 1970, as Cardillac's Daughter, opposite her husband as an officer, her lover. Her work in concert opera included a 1972 performance of Sir Arthur Bliss' The Olympians, as Madeleine.

At Wexford she appeared as Stéphano in Roméo et Juliette (1967), Aminta in Il re pastore (1971), and the title role in Eritrea (1975). She also appeared at the Aldeburgh and Edinburgh festivals. In 1969 she sang the Second niece in the BBC video of Peter Grimes, recorded in the Maltings and took the same role in the 1978 Philips recording under Colin Davis and the 1981 video, also with Davis. She appeared in a television version of The Rise and Fall of the City of Mahagonny on the BBC in 1965, as Jenny.

Pashley married fellow opera singer Jack Irons, a fellow Guildhall student, in 1959. The marriage produced a son, Leon, and a daughter, Cleo. The marriage lasted until Irons' death in 2005. Their son Leon died in 2013. Pashley's daughter Cleo survives her.
