= Phyllis Perkins =

British middle-distance runner (1934–2023)

Phyllis Perkins (née Phyllis Green)
Personal information
- Nationality: British (English)
- Born: 22 February 1934 Horfield, England
- Died: 22 February 2023 (aged 89) Kent, England
- Height: 165 cm (5 ft 5 in)
- Weight: 60 kg (132 lb)

Sport
- Sport: Athletics
- Event: Middle-distance running
- Club: Ilford AC

Phyllis Else Maureen Perkins (née Green; 22 February 1934 – 22 February 2023) was a British middle-distance runner who competed at the 1960 Summer Olympics.

== Biography ==
Under her maiden name of Green, she finished third behind Margaret Taylor in the 440 yards event at the 1952 WAAA Championships. before becoming the national 1 mile champion after winning the British WAAA Championships title at the 1954 WAAA Championships.

Perins retained her 1 mile title at the 1955 WAAA Championships and won the 880 yards title at the 1956 WAAA Championships.

At the 1960 Olympic Games in Rome, she represented Great Britain in the women's 800 metres.

Perkins finished second behind Joy Jordan at the 1962 WAAA Championships and shortly afterwards represented England in the 880 yards at the 1962 British Empire and Commonwealth Games in Perth, Australia.

Perkins won another WAAA title at the 1963 WAAA Championships.

Perkins died on 22 February 2023, her 89th birthday.
