= Patricia Devine (athlete) =

British sprinter

Personal information
- Nationality: British (Scottish)
- Born: 25 April 1932 (age 94) Dundee, Scotland
- Height: 159 cm (5 ft 3 in)
- Weight: 50 kg (110 lb)

Sport
- Sport: Athletics
- Event: Sprinting
- Club: Q Club (Dundee)

Priscilla Mary Patricia Yvonne Devine (born 25 April 1932) is a former British sprinter who competed at the 1952 Summer Olympics.

== Biography ==
Devine educated at the Morgan Academy, was a member of the Q Club in Dundee, a club formed by her father Dr J. Bernard Devine.

Devine represented Great Britain in the women's 200 metres at the 1952 Olympic Games in Helsinki.

Devine finished second behind Anne Pashley in the 100 yards event at the 1954 WAAA Championships.

She representated the Scottish team at the 1954 British Empire and Commonwealth Games in Vancouver, Canada, where she participated in the 100y, 220y and long jump events.
