= Shirley Cawley =

British athlete (born 1932)

Personal information
- Nationality: British (English)
- Born: 26 April 1932 (age 94) Croydon, England
- Height: 168 cm (5 ft 6 in)
- Weight: 56 kg (123 lb)

Sport
- Sport: Athletics
- Event: long jump
- Club: Croydon Harriers
Medal record
Representing Great Britain
Women's Olympics
| Bronze medal – third place | 1952 Helsinki | Long jump |

Shirley Cawley (born 26 April 1932) is a British former athlete who won the bronze medal in the long jump at the 1952 Summer Olympics held in Helsinki, Finland.

== Biography ==
Cawley was born in Croydon and ran for the Croydon Harriers.

Cawley finished second behind Dorothy Tyler in the long jump event at the 1951 WAAA Championships but became national long jump champion after winning the British WAAA Championships title at the 1952 WAAA Championships.

At the 1952 Olympic Games in Helsinki, Cawley represented Great Britain and finished in the long jump competition, winning a bronze medal.

She married John R. Berry in 1958.
