= Sonja Prétôt =

Swiss sprinter (1931–2025)

Personal information
- Nationality: Swiss
- Born: 7 June 1931
- Died: 24 November 2025 (aged 94)

Sport
- Sport: Sprinting
- Event: 100 metres

Sonja Prétôt (7 June 1931 – 24 November 2025) was a Swiss sprinter. She competed in the women's 100 metres at the 1952 Summer Olympics. Prétôt died on 24 November 2025, at the age of 94.
