= Sheila Hoskin =

British long jumper

Personal information
- Full name: Sheila Hilary Hoskin
- Born: 14 October 1936 (age 89) Hammersmith, London, England
- Height: 162 cm (5 ft 4 in)
- Weight: 53 kg (117 lb)

Sport
- Sport: Athletics
- Event: long jump
- Club: Spartan LAC
Medal record
Women's Athletics
Representing England
British Empire and Commonwealth Games
Gold medal – first place	1958 Cardiff	Long Jump

Sheila Hilary Hoskin (born 14 October 1936) is a former female track and field athlete from England who competed at the 1956 Summer Olympics.

== Biography ==
Born in Hammersmith, Hoskin competed in the women's long jump events during her career. She finished second behind Thelma Hopkins in the long jump event at the 1955 WAAA Championships.

The following year Hoskin represented Great Britain at the 1956 Olympic Games in Melbourne, Australia, where she competed in the long jump competition. Hoskin also became the national long jump champion after winning the British WAAA Championships title at the 1956 WAAA Championships.

Hoskin represented England and won a gold medal in the long jump at the 1958 British Empire and Commonwealth Games in Cardiff, Wales.

At one point Hoskin held the British record for the long jump.
