= Maya Giri =

British discus thrower (born 1929)

Personal information
- Nationality: British (English)
- Born: 1929 (age 95–96) Eastbourne, England

Sport
- Sport: Athletics
- Event: Discus / Shot put
- Club: Horsham Blue Star Harriers; Phoenix AC; London Univ

Maya Giri (born 1929) is a former athlete who competed for England.

== Biography ==
Giri was born in Eastbourne to a Russian father and Indian mother. Giri finished third behind Suzanne Farmer in the discus throw event at the 1952 WAAA Championships

Giri a school teacher by trade was later selected for Britain against France in August 1952.

Giri improved to second place behind Farmer the following year at the 1953 WAAA Championships. Giri became a double national discus champion after winning the WAAA Championships title at both the 1954 WAAA Championships and 1955 WAAA Championships.

Giri represented England in the discus at the 1958 British Empire and Commonwealth Games in Cardiff, Wales.
