= Athletics at the 1964 Summer Olympics – Women's pentathlon =

Women's pentathlon at the Games of the XVIII Olympiad
- Venue: Olympic Stadium
- Dates: 16–17 October 1964
- Competitors: 20 from 15 nations

Medalists
1st place, gold medalist(s)		Irina Press	Soviet Union
2nd place, silver medalist(s)		Mary Rand	Great Britain
3rd place, bronze medalist(s)		Galina Bystrova	Soviet Union

The women's pentathlon was part of the Athletics at the 1964 Summer Olympics program in Tokyo. It was held on 16 October and 17 October 1964, with the first three events on 16 October and the last two on 17 October. 20 athletes from 15 nations entered. The 1964 Summer Olympics were the first appearance of the women's pentathlon.

The events of the pentathlon, in order, were:

1. 80 metre hurdles
2. Shot put
3. High jump
4. Long jump
5. 200 metres

== Results ==
=== First day ===
==== 80 metre hurdles ====
Place	Athlete	Nation	Time	Points		
Place	Athlete	Nation	Time	Event	Total	Rank
1	Galina Bystrova	Soviet Union	10.7 seconds	1096	1096	1
1	Irina Press	Soviet Union	10.7 seconds	1096	1096	1
3	Mary Rand	Great Britain	10.9 seconds	1061	1061	3
3	Draga Stamejčič	Yugoslavia	10.9 seconds	1061	1061	3
5	Mary Elizabeth Peters	Great Britain	11.0 seconds	1044	1044	5
6	Chi Cheng	Taiwan	11.1 seconds	1027	1027	6
6	Denise Guenard	France	11.1 seconds	1027	1027	6
6	Nina Hansen	Denmark	11.1 seconds	1027	1027	6
6	Mariya Sizyakova	Soviet Union	11.1 seconds	1027	1027	6
10	Helga Hoffmann	United Team of Germany	11.2 seconds	1011	1011	10
11	Amelia Hinten	Netherlands	11.3 seconds	995	995	11
11	Jenny Wingerson	Canada	11.3 seconds	995	995	11
13	Ingrid Becker	United Team of Germany	11.6 seconds	948	948	13
14	Helen Frith	Australia	11.9 seconds	904	904	14
14	Dianne Gerace	Canada	11.9 seconds	904	904	14
16	Oddrun Hokland	Norway	12.0 seconds	890	890	16
16	Miyuki Takahashi	Japan	12.0 seconds	890	890	16
16	Pat Winslow	United States	12.0 seconds	890	890	16
19	Ulla Flegel	Austria	12.2 seconds	862	862	19
20	Lee Hak Ja	South Korea	12.6 seconds	809	809	20

==== Shot put ====
Press's shot put, nearly 2.7 metres further than the nearest competitor's, combined with her hurdles victory to give her a solid lead after two events.

Place	Athlete	Nation	Distance	Points		
Place	Athlete	Nation	Distance	Event	Total	Rank
1	Irina Press	Soviet Union	17.16 metres	1173	2269	1
2	Mary Elizabeth Peters	Great Britain	14.48 metres	1015	2059	3
3	Galina Bystrova	Soviet Union	14.47 metres	1014	2110	2
4	Pat Winslow	United States	13.04 metres	924	1814	10
5	Draga Stamejčič	Yugoslavia	12.73 metres	904	1965	4
6	Jennifer Wingerson	Canada	12.06 metres	859	1854	6
7	Maria Siziakova	Soviet Union	11.87 metres	846	1873	5
8	Ulla Flegel	Austria	11.66 metres	832	1694	17
9	Ingrid Becker	United Team of Germany	11.62 metres	829	1777	11
10	Denise Guenard	France	11.30 metres	807	1834	8
11	Nina Hansen	Denmark	11.26 metres	804	1831	9
12	Dianne Gerace	Canada	11.19 metres	799	1703	15
13	Helen Frith	Australia	11.16 metres	797	1701	16
14	Mary Rand	Great Britain	11.05 metres	789	1850	7
15	Amelia Hinten	Netherlands	10.72 metres	766	1761	13
16	Helga Hoffmann	United Team of Germany	10.67 metres	762	1773	12
17	Lee Hak Ja	South Korea	10.19 metres	727	1536	20
18	Oddrun Hokland	Norway	10.05 metres	717	1607	18
19	Chi Cheng	Taiwan	9.79 metres	697	1724	14
20	Takahashi Miyuki	Japan	9.56 metres	680	1570	19

==== High jump ====
Place	Athlete	Nation	Height	Points		
Place	Athlete	Nation	Height	Event	Total	Rank
1	Mary Rand	Great Britain	1.72 metres	1067	2917	4
2	Dianne Gerace	Canada	1.69 metres	1037	2740	9
2	Helen Frith	Australia	1.69 metres	1037	2738	10
4	Irina Press	Soviet Union	1.63 metres	976	3245	1
4	Pat Winslow	United States	1.63 metres	976	2790	6
4	Ulla Flegel	Austria	1.63 metres	976	2670	14
4	Oddrun Hokland	Norway	1.63 metres	976	2583	16
8	Galina Bystrova	Soviet Union	1.60 metres	945	3055	2
8	Mary Elizabeth Peters	Great Britain	1.60 metres	945	3004	3
8	Denise Guenard	France	1.60 metres	945	2779	8
8	Ingrid Becker	United Team of Germany	1.60 metres	945	2722	11
8	Helga Hoffmann	United Team of Germany	1.60 metres	945	2718	12
13	Maria Siziakova	Soviet Union	1.57 metres	913	2786	7
14	Draga Stamejčič	Yugoslavia	1.54 metres	880	2845	5
14	Nina Hansen	Denmark	1.54 metres	880	2711	13
16	Jennifer Wingerson	Canada	1.48 metres	814	2668	15
17	Amelia Hinten	Netherlands	1.45 metres	780	2541	17
18	Chi Cheng	Taiwan	1.40 metres	721	2445	18
18	Takahashi Miyuki	Japan	1.40 metres	721	2291	19
20	Lee Hak Ja	South Korea	1.35 metres	660	2196	20

==== First day rankings ====
1. Irina Press, 3245 points
2. Galina Bystrova, 3055 points
3. Mary Elizabeth Peters, 3004 points
4. Mary Rand, 2917 points
5. Draga Stamejčič, 2845 points
6. Pat Winslow, 2790 points
7. Maria Siziakova, 2786 points
8. Denise Guenard, 2779 points
9. Dianne Gerace, 2740 points
10. Helen Frith, 2738 points
11. Ingrid Becker, 2722 points
12. Helga Hoffmann, 2718 points
13. Nina Hansen, 2711 points
14. Ulla Flegel, 2670 points
15. Jennifer Wingerson, 2668 points
16. Oddrun Hokland, 2583 points
17. Amelia Hinten, 2541 points
18. Chi Cheng, 2445 points
19. Takahashi Miyuki, 2291 points
20. Lee Hak Ja, 2196 points

=== Second day ===
==== Long jump ====
Rand won her second straight event, climbing back up to third place overall after her fall to seventh following the shot put. Press, never having been outside the top four in any event, increased her lead to over 200 points above fellow Soviet Bystrova.

Place	Athlete	Nation	Distance	Points		
Place	Athlete	Nation	Distance	Event	Total	Rank
1	Mary Rand	Great Britain	6.55 metres	1111	4028	3
2	Helga Hoffmann	United Team of Germany	6.44 metres	1087	3805	6
3	Nina Hansen	Denmark	6.27 metres	1049	3760	8
4	Irina Press	Soviet Union	6.24 metres	1042	4287	1
5	Draga Stamejčič	Yugoslavia	6.19 metres	1031	3876	5
6	Ingrid Becker	United Team of Germany	6.17 metres	1027	3749	10
7	Galina Bystrova	Soviet Union	6.11 metres	1014	4069	2
8	Maria Siziakova	Soviet Union	5.94 metres	975	3761	7
9	Pat Winslow	United States	5.90 metres	966	3756	9
10	Helen Frith	Australia	5.87 metres	959	3697	11
11	Amelia Hinten	Netherlands	5.82 metres	948	3489	16
12	Oddrun Hokland	Norway	5.79 metres	941	3524	15
13	Dianne Gerace	Canada	5.76 metres	934	3674	13
14	Chi Cheng	Taiwan	5.72 metres	924	3369	18
15	Denise Guenard	France	5.69 metres	918	3697	11
16	Mary Elizabeth Peters	Great Britain	5.60 metres	897	3901	4
17	Jennifer Wingerson	Canada	5.52 metres	878	3546	14
18	Takahashi Miyuki	Japan	5.51 metres	875	3166	19
19	Ulla Flegel	Austria	5.22 metres	806	3476	17
20	Lee Hak Ja	South Korea	4.91 metres	729	2925	20

==== 200 metres ====
Rand won her third straight event to pass Bystrova and take the silver medal. Press, who had won the first two events, had her lowest finish of the pentathlon in sixth place, still winning the gold medal by over 200 points and breaking her own world record (5137 points, set in 1961) by more than 100 points.

Place	Athlete	Nation	Time	Points		
Place	Athlete	Nation	Time	Event	Total	Rank
1	Mary Rand	Great Britain	24.2 seconds	1007	5035	2
2	Amelia Hinten	Netherlands	24.5 seconds	977	4466	14
3	Pat Winslow	United States	24.6 seconds	968	4724	7
3	Ingrid Becker	United Team of Germany	24.6 seconds	968	4717	8
3	Jennifer Wingerson	Canada	24.6 seconds	968	4514	13
6	Irina Press	Soviet Union	24.7 seconds	959	5246	1
7	Helga Hoffmann	United Team of Germany	25.0 seconds	932	4737	6
8	Draga Stamejčič	Yugoslavia	25.2 seconds	914	4790	5
9	Oddrun Hokland	Norway	25.3 seconds	905	4429	16
10	Mary Elizabeth Peters	Great Britain	25.4 seconds	896	4797	4
11	Galina Bystrova	Soviet Union	25.5 seconds	887	4956	3
12	Helen Frith	Australia	25.8 seconds	860	4557	11
12	Chi Cheng	Taiwan	25.8 seconds	860	4229	17
14	Nina Hansen	Denmark	25.9 seconds	851	4611	9
14	Denise Guenard	France	25.9 seconds	851	4548	12
16	Maria Siziakova	Soviet Union	26.3 seconds	819	4580	10
17	Dianne Gerace	Canada	26.9 seconds	771	4445	15
18	Takahashi Miyuki	Japan	27.2 seconds	748	3914	18
19	Lee Hak Ja	South Korea	27.5 seconds	724	3649	19
—	Ulla Flegel	Austria	Withdrew	—	3476	—

==== Final standings ====
Place	Athlete	Nation	Points
1st place, gold medalist(s)	Irina Press	Soviet Union	5246 WR
2nd place, silver medalist(s)	Mary Rand	Great Britain	5035
3rd place, bronze medalist(s)	Galina Bystrova	Soviet Union	4956
4	Mary Elizabeth Peters	Great Britain	4797
5	Draga Stamejčič	Yugoslavia	4790
6	Helga Hoffmann	United Team of Germany	4737
7	Pat Winslow	United States	4724
8	Ingrid Becker	United Team of Germany	4717
9	Nina Hansen	Denmark	4611
10	Maria Siziakova	Soviet Union	4580
11	Helen Frith	Australia	4557
12	Denise Guenard	France	4548
13	Jennifer Wingerson	Canada	4514
14	Amelia Hinten	Netherlands	4466
15	Dianne Gerace	Canada	4445
16	Oddrun Hokland	Norway	4429
17	Chi Cheng	Taiwan	4229
18	Takahashi Miyuki	Japan	3914
19	Lee Hak Ja	South Korea	3649
—	Ulla Flegel	Austria	Did not finish 3476 after 4 events
