= Athletics at the 1964 Summer Olympics – Women's 80 metres hurdles =

Women's 80 metres hurdles at the Games of the XVIII Olympiad
- Venue: Olympic Stadium
- Dates: 18–19 October 1964
- Competitors: 31 from 20 nations
- Winning time: 10.5

Medalists
1st place, gold medalist(s)		Karin Balzer; United Team of Germany
2nd place, silver medalist(s)		Teresa Ciepły; Poland
3rd place, bronze medalist(s)		Pam Kilborn; Australia

Official Video Highlights @59:07 Video on YouTube

The women's 80 metres hurdles was the only women's hurdle race in the Athletics at the 1964 Summer Olympics program in Tokyo. It was held on 18 October and 19 October 1964. 31 athletes from 20 nations entered, with 4 not starting the first round. The first round was held on 18 October, with the semifinals and final on 19 October. The 1965 film Tokyo Olympiad by Kon Ichikawa shows amazingly great detail of the preliminaries, preparation, final and medal ceremony surrounding this event. The slow motion study of the final shows Yoda Ikuko getting a fast start. Joining Ikuko in the lead is Teresa Ciepły. Rosie Bonds crashed the second hurdle and is awkward the rest of the race. By the third hurdle Pam Kilborn has overtaken Ikuko and Ciepły for the lead. Karin Balzer and Irina Press were close behind. Over the course of the final five hurdles, Balzer and Press edged closer as Ikuko lost a little ground. Ciepły, Kilborn and Balzer landing at virtually the same moment and Press inches behind. On the run in, Balzer was able to gain just enough ground to take the gold over a straining Ciepły.

== Results ==
=== First round ===
The top four runners in each of the 4 heats advanced.

==== Heat 1 ====
Wind: +0.9 m/s

Place	Athlete	Nation	Time (hand)	Time (automatic)
1	Karin Balzer	United Team of Germany	10.7	10.71
2	Galina Bystrova	Soviet Union	10.9	10.96
3	Rose Hart	Ghana	11.3	11.34
4	Snejana Kerkova	Bulgaria	11.5	11.50
5	Lorraine Dunn	Panama	11.5	11.53
—	Amy Snider	Canada	Disqualified	–
—	Amelia Hinten	Netherlands	Did not start	–

==== Heat 2 ====
Wind: +2.6 m/s

Place	Athlete	Nation	Time (hand)	Time (automatic)
1	Irina Press	Soviet Union	10.7	10.77
2	Pat Pryce	Great Britain	10.8	10.82
3	Avis Mcintosh	New Zealand	10.8	10.84
4	Gundula Diel	United Team of Germany	10.9	10.94
5	Cherrie Sherrard	United States	11.0	11.00
6	Marlene Canguio	France	11.0	11.09
7	Chi Cheng	Taiwan	11.1	11.18
8	Sirkka Norrlund	Finland	11.2	11.23

==== Heat 3 ====
Wind: +6.5 m/s There was a strong wind behind the runners; the official report does not credit Piątkowska with equalling the Olympic record of 10.6.

Place	Athlete	Nation	Time (hand)	Time (automatic)
1	Maria Piątkowska	Poland	10.6	10.67
2	Pam Kilborn	Australia	10.7	10.79
3	Tatyana Talysheva	Soviet Union	10.9	10.92
4	Lacey O'Neal	United States	10.9	10.93
5	Carmen Smith	Jamaica	11.8	–
6	Yeh Chu Mei	Taiwan	12.1	–
—	Zenta Kopp	United Team of Germany	Did not start	–
—	Mary Rand	Great Britain	Did not start	–

==== Heat 4 ====
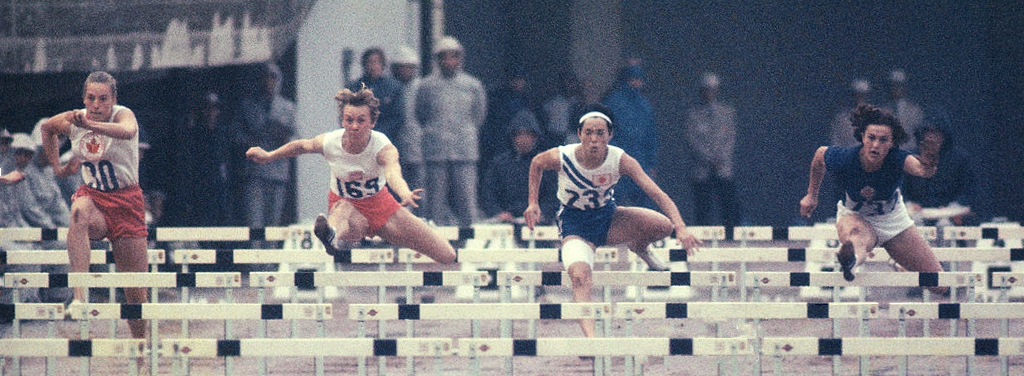
Left-right: Jenny Meldrum, Teresa Ciepły, Ikuko Yoda and Draga Stamejčič running heat 4

Wind: +4.2 m/s

Place	Athlete	Nation	Time (hand)	Time (automatic)
1	Rosie Bonds	United States	10.6	10.64
2	Yoda Ikuko	Japan	10.7	10.71
3	Teresa Ciepły	Poland	10.7	10.73
4	Draga Stamejčič	Yugoslavia	10.8	10.84
5	Jenny Wingerson	Canada	11.1	11.16
6	Inge Aigner	Austria	11.2	11.27
7	Mary Musani	Uganda	12.9	–
—	Denise Guenard	France	Did not start	–

=== Semifinals ===
The top four runners in each semifinal advanced to the final.

==== Semifinal 1 ====
Wind: +0.2 m/s

Place	Athlete	Nation	Time (hand)	Time (automatic)
1	Pam Kilborn	Australia	10.6 =OR	10.69
2	Teresa Ciepły	Poland	10.7	10.77
3	Irina Press	Soviet Union	10.8	10.85
4	Rosie Bonds	United States	10.8	10.87
5	Avis Mcintosh	New Zealand	10.9	10.90
6	Tatyana Talysheva	Soviet Union	10.9	10.98
7	Gundula Diel	United Team of Germany	11.0	11.05
8	Snejana Kerkova	Bulgaria	11.4	11.41

==== Semifinal 2 ====
Wind: +1.7 m/s

Place	Athlete	Nation	Time (hand)	Time (automatic)
1	Karin Balzer	United Team of Germany	10.6 =OR	10.65
2	Yoda Ikuko	Japan	10.7	10.72
3	Draga Stamejčič	Yugoslavia	10.7	10.73
4	Maria Piątkowska	Poland	10.7	10.75
5	Pat Pryce	Great Britain	10.7	10.75
6	Galina Bystrova	Soviet Union	10.8	10.89
7	Leahseneth O'Neal	United States	10.9	10.99
8	Rose Hart	Ghana	11.1	11.16

=== Final ===
Balzer, Ciepły, and Kilborn are not credited by the official report with tying the world record of 10.5 (and breaking the 10.6 second Olympic record) due to the wind advantage. They finished in one of the closest endings to an Olympic final ever, with Balzer defeating Ciepły by about one-hundredth of a second and Kilborn by two one-hundredths.

Wind: +2.3 m/s

Place	Athlete	Nation	Time (hand)	Time (automatic)
1st place, gold medalist(s)	Karin Balzer	United Team of Germany	10.5	10.54
2nd place, silver medalist(s)	Teresa Ciepły	Poland	10.5	10.55
3rd place, bronze medalist(s)	Pam Kilborn	Australia	10.6	10.56
4	Irina Press	Soviet Union	10.6	10.62
5	Ikuko Yoda	Japan	10.7	10.72
6	Maria Piątkowska	Poland	10.7	10.76
7	Draga Stamejčič	Yugoslavia	10.8	10.86
8	Rosie Bonds	United States	10.8	10.88
