= Athletics at the 1960 Summer Olympics – Women's 80 metres hurdles =

Women's 80 metres hurdles at the Games of the XVII Olympiad
- Venue: Olympic Stadium
- Dates: August 31, 1960 (heats and semifinals); September 1, 1960 (final)
- Competitors: 36 from 21 nations
- Winning time: 10.9

Medalists
1st place, gold medalist(s)		Irina Press; Soviet Union
2nd place, silver medalist(s)		Carole Quinton; Great Britain
3rd place, bronze medalist(s)		Gisela Birkemeyer; United Team of Germany

The women's 80 metres hurdles hurdling event at the 1960 Olympic Games took place between August 31 and September 1.

== Results ==
=== Heats ===
The top two runners in each of the six heats advanced to the semifinal round.

==== Heat 1 ====
Wind: +0.4 m/s

Rank	Athlete	Nation	Time	Notes
1	Irina Press	Soviet Union	10.91	OR
2	Carole Quinton	Great Britain	11.07	
3	Draga Stamejčič	Yugoslavia	11.47	
4	Ulla-Britt Wieslander	Sweden	11.60	
5	Irene Robertson	United States	11.69	

==== Heat 2 ====
Wind: -0.5 m/s

Rank	Athlete	Nation	Time	Notes
1	Mary Bignal	Great Britain	11.40	
2	Norma Thrower	Australia	11.54	
3	Snezhana Kerkova	Bulgaria	11.73	
4	Wanda dos Santos	Brazil	11.84	
5	Bertha Díaz	Cuba	11.84	

==== Heat 3 ====
Wind: -0.4 m/s

Rank	Athlete	Nation	Time	Notes
1	Rimma Koshelyova	Soviet Union	11.26	
2	Denise Laborie-Guénard	France	11.37	
3	Alena Stolzová	Czechoslovakia	11.59	
4	Jo Ann Terry-Grissom	United States	11.59	
	Mária Bácskai	Hungary	DNS	

==== Heat 4 ====
Wind: -0.5 m/s

Rank	Athlete	Nation	Time	Notes
1	Gisela Birkemeyer	United Team of Germany	11.31	
2	Barbara Sosgórnik	Poland	11.56	
3	Pat Nutting	Great Britain	11.65	
4	Sally McCallum	Canada	11.90	
5	Friedl Murauer	Austria	12.08	

==== Heat 5 ====
Wind: -0.5 m/s

Rank	Athlete	Nation	Time	Notes
1	Karin Balzer	United Team of Germany	11.40	
2	Teresa Ciepły	Poland	11.46	
3	Simone Brièrre	France	11.75	
4	Gloria Cooke-Wigney	Australia	11.89	

==== Heat 6 ====
Wind: -0.4 m/s

Rank	Athlete	Nation	Time	Notes
1	Zenta Gastl-Kopp	United Team of Germany	11.10	
2	Galina Bystrova	Soviet Union	11.26	
3	Letizia Bertoni	Italy	11.54	
4	Shirley Crowder	United States	12.43	
5	Chi Cheng	Formosa	12.71	

=== Semifinal ===
The top three runners in each of the two heats advanced to the final round.

==== Heat 1 ====
Wind: -0.9 m/s

Rank	Athlete	Nation	Time	Notes
1	Galina Bystrova	Soviet Union	11.16	
2	Mary Bignal	Great Britain	11.16	
3	Rimma Koshelyova	Soviet Union	11.22	
4	Karin Balzer	United Team of Germany	11.27	
5	Norma Thrower	Australia	11.44	
6	Barbara Sosgórnik	Poland	11.46	

==== Heat 2 ====
Wind: 0.0 m/s

Rank	Athlete	Nation	Time	Notes
1	Irina Press	Soviet Union	10.77	OR
2	Gisela Birkemeyer	United Team of Germany	11.01	
3	Carole Quinton	Great Britain	11.07	
4	Zenta Gastl-Kopp	United Team of Germany	11.09	
5	Teresa Ciepły	Poland	11.40	
6	Denise Laborie-Guénard	France	11.51	

=== Final ===
Wind: 0.0 m/s.

Rank	Athlete	Nation	Time	Notes
1st place, gold medalist(s)	Irina Press	Soviet Union	10.93	
2nd place, silver medalist(s)	Carole Quinton	Great Britain	10.99	
3rd place, bronze medalist(s)	Gisela Birkemeyer	United Team of Germany	11.13	
4	Mary Bignal	Great Britain	11.22	
5	Galina Bystrova	Soviet Union	11.26	
6	Rimma Koshelyova	Soviet Union	11.28	

Key: OR = Olympic record

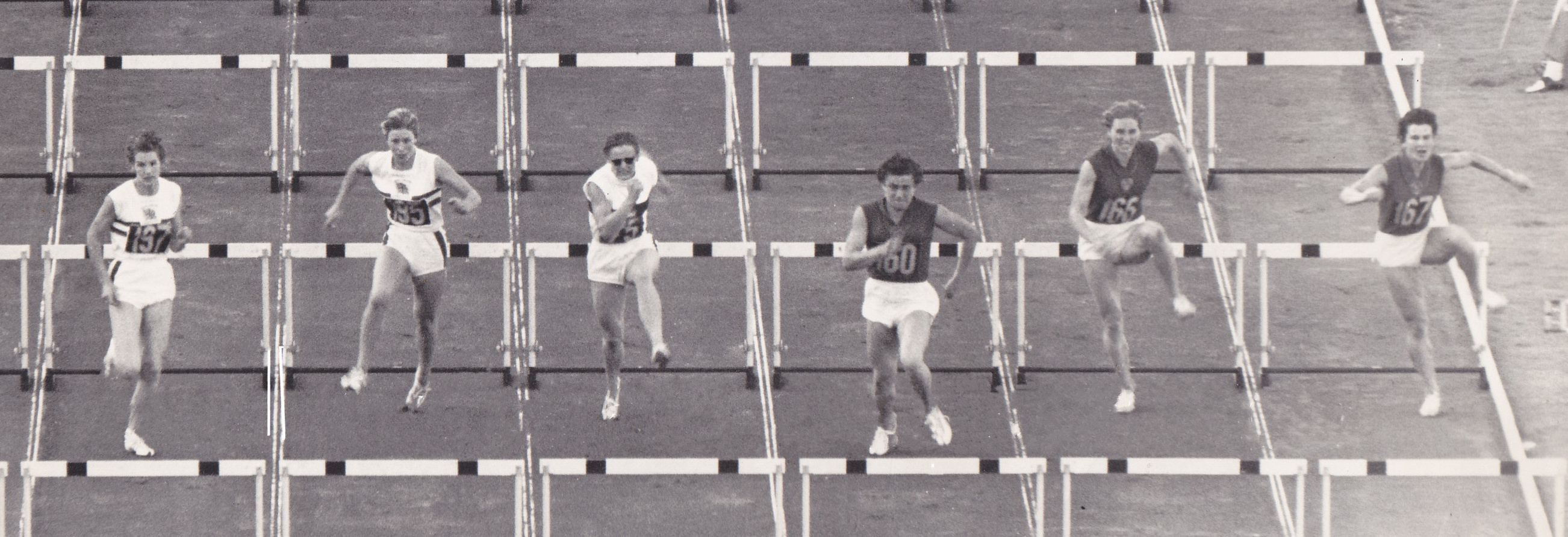
80 m final. Birkemeyer and Press are in the center, Quinton is on the left
