= 1962 European Athletics Championships – Women's 80 metres hurdles =

Women's 80 metres hurdles at the European Athletics Championships

The women's 80 metres hurdles at the 1962 European Athletics Championships was held in Belgrade, then Yugoslavia, at JNA Stadium on 14, 15, and 16 September 1962.

== Medalists ==
Gold	Teresa Ciepły; Poland
Silver	Karin Balzer; East Germany
Bronze	Maria Piątkowska; Poland
Bronze	Erika Fisch; West Germany

== Results ==
=== Final ===
16 September Wind: 0.1 m/s

Rank	Name	Nationality	Time	Notes
1st place, gold medalist(s)	Teresa Ciepły	Poland	10.6	CR NR
2nd place, silver medalist(s)	Karin Balzer	East Germany	10.6	CR
3rd place, bronze medalist(s)	Maria Piątkowska	Poland	10.6	CR NR
3rd place, bronze medalist(s)	Erika Fisch	West Germany	10.6	CR NR
5	Rimma Koshelyova	Soviet Union	10.8	
6	Galina Bystrova	Soviet Union	10.8	

=== Semi-finals ===
15 September

==== Semi-final 1 ====
Wind: -3 m/s

Rank	Name	Nationality	Time	Notes
1	Maria Piątkowska	Poland	11.0	Q
2	Erika Fisch	West Germany	11.0	Q
3	Rimma Koshelyova	Soviet Union	11.1	Q
4	Letizia Bertoni	Italy	11.3	
4	Dorothy Window	Great Britain	11.3	
6	Draga Stamejčič	Yugoslavia	11.6	

==== Semi-final 2 ====
Wind: -3.8 m/s

Rank	Name	Nationality	Time	Notes
1	Galina Bystrova	Soviet Union	11.2	Q
2	Karin Balzer	East Germany	11.3	Q
3	Teresa Ciepły	Poland	11.4	Q
4	Marlène Canguio	France	11.4	
5	Halina Krzyżańska	Poland	11.5	
	Nina Hansen	Denmark	DNS	

=== Heats ===
14 September

==== Heat 1 ====
Wind: 1.9 m/s

Rank	Name	Nationality	Time	Notes
1	Maria Piątkowska	Poland	10.8	Q
2	Dorothy Window	Great Britain	11.1	Q
3	Letizia Bertoni	Italy	11.1	Q

==== Heat 2 ====
Wind: 1.6 m/s

Rank	Name	Nationality	Time	Notes
1	Erika Fisch	West Germany	10.7	CR Q
2	Galina Bystrova	Soviet Union	10.7	CR Q
3	Nina Hansen	Denmark	11.4	Q

==== Heat 3 ====
Wind: 0.8 m/s

Rank	Name	Nationality	Time	Notes
1	Teresa Ciepły	Poland	10.7	CR Q
2	Rimma Koshelyova	Soviet Union	10.9	Q
3	Marlène Canguio	France	10.9	NR Q
4	Ingrid Schlundt	West Germany	11.0	
5	Pat Nutting	Great Britain	11.1	

==== Heat 4 ====
Wind: 2.1 m/s

Rank	Name	Nationality	Time	Notes
1	Karin Balzer	East Germany	10.9 w	Q
2	Draga Stamejčič	Yugoslavia	11.0 w	Q
3	Halina Krzyżańska	Poland	11.0 w	Q
4	Ann Charlesworth	Great Britain	11.3 w	
5	Canel Konvur	Turkey	12.7 w	

== Participation ==
According to an unofficial count, 16 athletes from 10 countries participated in the event.

- Denmark (1)
- East Germany (1)
- France (1)
- Italy (1)
- Poland (3)
- Soviet Union (2)
- Turkey (1)
- Great Britain (3)
- West Germany (2)
- Yugoslavia (1)
