= 1958 European Athletics Championships – Women's pentathlon =

Women's pentathlon at the European Athletics Championships

The women's pentathlon at the 1958 European Athletics Championships was held in Stockholm, Sweden, at Stockholms Olympiastadion on 21 August 1958.

== Medalists ==
Gold	Galina Bystrova; Soviet Union
Silver	Nina Vinogradova; Soviet Union
Bronze	Edeltraud Eiberle; West Germany

== Results ==
=== Final ===
21 August

The highest mark recorded in each event is highlighted in yellow

Rank	Name	Nationality	SP	HJ	200m	80m H	LJ	Points	Notes
1st place, gold medalist(s)	Galina Bystrova	Soviet Union	13.14	1.54	25.2	10.9	5.82	3989 (4733)	CR
2nd place, silver medalist(s)	Nina Vinogradova	Soviet Union	13.62	1.54	25.6	11.2	5.60	3861 (4627)	
3rd place, bronze medalist(s)	Edeltraud Eiberle	West Germany	11.30	1.54	25.1	11.1	5.65	3786 (4545)	
4	Diny Hobers	Netherlands	13.01	1.66	26.0	11.9	5.27	3708 (4494)	
5	Olga Modrachová	Czechoslovakia	11.82	1.64	25.2	12.3	5.59	3706 (4484)	
6	Maria Bibro	Poland	10.65	1.47	24.4	11.5	5.89	3728 (4477)	
7	Mary Rand	Great Britain	9.07	1.66	25.0	11.4	5.64	3730 (4466)	
8	Lidiya Shmakova	Soviet Union	12.41	1.52	25.8	11.7	5.68	3676 (4448)	
9	Maria Chojnacka	Poland	10.53	1.50	25.2	11.6	5.88	3659 (4411)	
10	Draga Stamejčič	Yugoslavia	12.83	1.41	25.5	11.4	5.42	3585 (4363)	
11	Corrie van den Bosch	Netherlands	11.95	1.47	25.9	11.7	5.38	3493 (4281)	
12	Isabel Heider	West Germany	10.31	1.47	26.2	11.6	5.68	3464 (4228)	
13	Madeleine Thetu	France	10.88	1.50	26.4	12.3	5.54	3363 (4154)	
14	Snezhana Zhalova	Bulgaria	11.31	1.38	25.7	11.5	5.02	3306 (4093)	
15	Ulla Flegel	Austria	11.21	1.47	25.9	12.3	5.10	3270 (4077)	
16	Trude Fries	Austria	9.46	1.52	26.8	11.7	5.18	3252 (4038)	
17	Jorun Tangen	Norway	10.43	1.47	26.3	12.1	5.16	3232 (4033)	
18	Stina Cronholm	Sweden	8.94	1.52	26.9	11.7	4.82	3112 (3901)	
19	Gertrud Hantschk	West Germany	11.96	1.50	25.0	18.0	5.40	2959 (3794)	
20	Inga-Britt Lorentzon	Sweden	9.64	1.56	28.3	12.8	4.94	2956 (3775)	
21	Fry Frischknecht	Switzerland	11.60	1.44	27.8	DNF	5.00	2377 (3049)	
	Gretel Bolliger	Switzerland	11.07	1.35				DNF	

== Participation ==
According to an unofficial count, 22 athletes from 13 countries participated in the event.

- Austria (2)
- Bulgaria (1)
- Czechoslovakia (1)
- France (1)
- Netherlands (2)
- Norway (1)
- Poland (2)
- Soviet Union (3)
- Sweden (2)
- Switzerland (2)
- Great Britain (1)
- West Germany (3)
- Yugoslavia (1)
