= Athletics at the 1961 Summer Universiade – Women's long jump =

The women's long jump event at the 1961 Summer Universiade was held at the Vasil Levski National Stadium in Sofia, Bulgaria, in September 1961.

== Results ==
Rank	Athlete	Nationality	Result	Notes
1st place, gold medalist(s)	Tatyana Shchelkanova	Soviet Union	6.49	
2nd place, silver medalist(s)	Diana Yorgova	Bulgaria	6.12	
3rd place, bronze medalist(s)	Elżbieta Krzesińska	Poland	6.11	
4	Uta Böge	West Germany	5.98	
5	Thelma Hopkins	Great Britain	5.87	
6	Sanda Grosu	Romania	5.74	
7	Barbara Krötenheerdt	West Germany	5.61	
8	Federica Galli	Italy	5.53	
9	Donka Naneva	Bulgaria	5.46	
