= Athletics at the 1961 Summer Universiade – Women's 4 × 100 metres relay =

The women's 4 × 100 metres relay event at the 1961 Summer Universiade was held at the Vasil Levski National Stadium in Sofia, Bulgaria, in September 1961.

== Results ==
=== Final ===
| Rank | Nation | Athletes | Time | Notes |
|---|---|---|---|---|
| 1st place, gold medalist(s) | Soviet Union | Irina Press, Tatyana Shchelkanova, Rimma Koshelyova, Larisa Kuleshova | 46.2 | |
| 2nd place, silver medalist(s) | Poland | Mirosława Sałacińska, Irena Szczupak, Elżbieta Krzesińska, Barbara Janiszewska | 47.6 | |
| 3rd place, bronze medalist(s) | Bulgaria | Stefka Ilieva, Diana Yorgova, Svetlana Isaeva, Rossitsa Madzharska | 47.9 | |
| 4 | Italy | Nadia Mecocci, Fausta Galuzzi, Federica Galli, Angela Nattino | 48.1 | |
| 5 | West Germany | Antje Gleichfeld, Gisela Winckler (runner), Uta Böge, ? | 48.3 | |
