= 1962 European Athletics Championships – Women's long jump =

Women's long jump at the European Athletics Championships

The women's long jump at the 1962 European Athletics Championships was held in Belgrade, then Yugoslavia, at JNA Stadium on 14 and 15 September 1962.

== Medalists ==
Gold	Tatyana Shchelkanova; Soviet Union
Silver	Elżbieta Krzesińska; Poland
Bronze	Mary Rand; Great Britain

== Results ==
=== Final ===
15 September

Rank	Name	Nationality	Result	Notes
1st place, gold medalist(s)	Tatyana Shchelkanova	Soviet Union	6.36	
2nd place, silver medalist(s)	Elżbieta Krzesińska	Poland	6.22	
3rd place, bronze medalist(s)	Mary Rand	Great Britain	6.22	
4	Joke Bijleveld	Netherlands	6.21	
5	Helga Hoffmann	West Germany	6.19	
6	Hildrun Claus	East Germany	6.12	
7	Diana Yorgova	Bulgaria	5.98	
8	Bärbel Geissler	East Germany	5.95	
9	Tatyana Talysheva	Soviet Union	5.92	
10	Viorica Viscopoleanu	Romania	5.83	
11	Oddrun Lange	Norway	5.82	
12	Sheila Sherwood	Great Britain	5.78	

=== Qualification ===
14 September

Rank	Name	Nationality	Result	Notes
1	Tatyana Shchelkanova	Soviet Union	6.38	CR Q
2	Mary Rand	Great Britain	6.29	Q
3	Hildrun Claus	East Germany	6.25	Q
4	Helga Hoffmann	West Germany	6.23	Q
5	Joke Bijleveld	Netherlands	6.22	Q
6	Sheila Sherwood	Great Britain	6.15	Q
7	Diana Yorgova	Bulgaria	6.14	Q
8	Viorica Viscopoleanu	Romania	6.14	NR Q
9	Elżbieta Krzesińska	Poland	6.13	Q
10	Bärbel Geissler	East Germany	6.11	Q
11	Tatyana Talysheva	Soviet Union	6.05	Q
12	Oddrun Lange	Norway	5.98	NR Q
13	Vera Rozsavölgyi	Hungary	5.96	
14	Orsolya Petró	Hungary	5.86	
15	Berit Berthelsen	Norway	5.81	
16	Maija Koivusaari	Finland	5.80	
17	Halina Krzyżańska	Poland	5.76	
18	Magaly Vettorazzo	Italy	5.17	

== Participation ==
According to an unofficial count, 18 athletes from 12 countries participated in the event.

- Bulgaria (1)
- East Germany (2)
- Finland (1)
- Hungary (2)
- Italy (1)
- Netherlands (1)
- Norway (2)
- Poland (2)
- Romania (1)
- Soviet Union (2)
- Great Britain (2)
- West Germany (1)
