= Athletics at the 1965 Summer Universiade – Women's long jump =

The women's long jump event at the 1965 Summer Universiade was held at the People's Stadium in Budapest on 27 August 1965.

== Results ==
Rank	Name	Nationality	Result	Notes
1st place, gold medalist(s)	Tatyana Shchelkanova	Soviet Union	6.42	
2nd place, silver medalist(s)	Viorica Viscopoleanu	Romania	6.18	
3rd place, bronze medalist(s)	Dorothee Sander	West Germany	5.98	
4	Bärbel Palmié	West Germany	5.96	
5	Eva Kucmanová	Czechoslovakia	5.93	
6	Ecaterina Potoroacă	Romania	5.92	
7	Mirosława Sarna	Poland	5.86	
8	Loraine Winfield	Great Britain	5.64	
9	Annamária Kovács	Hungary	5.57	
10	Małgorzata Stepczyńska	Poland	5.28	
	Sheila Parkin	Great Britain	NM	
