= Athletics at the 1964 Summer Olympics – Women's long jump =

Women's long jump at the Games of the XVIII Olympiad
- Venue: Olympic Stadium
- Date: 14 October 1964
- Competitors: 32 from 20 nations
- Winning distance: 6.76 WR

Medalists
1st place, gold medalist(s)		Mary Rand; Great Britain
2nd place, silver medalist(s)		Irena Kirszenstein-Szewinska; Poland
3rd place, bronze medalist(s)		Tatyana Schelkanova; Soviet Union

Official Video Highlights

The women's long jump was one of two women's jumping events on the Athletics at the 1964 Summer Olympics program in Tokyo. It was held on 14 October 1964. 32 athletes from 20 nations entered, with 1 not starting in the qualification round.

== Results ==
=== Qualification ===
The qualification standard was 6.00 metres. Each jumper had three opportunities.

Place	Athlete	Nation	Best mark	Jump 1	Jump 2	Jump 3
1	Mary Rand	Great Britain	6.52 metres OR	6.52	—	
2	Helga Hoffmann	United Team of Germany	6.44 metres	6.44	—	
3	Irena Kirszenstein-Szewinska	Poland	6.43 metres	5.80	6.43	—
4	Ingrid Becker	United Team of Germany	6.37 metres	6.37	—	
4	Viorica Viscopoleanu	Romania	6.37 metres	X	6.37	—
6	Berit Berthelsen	Norway	6.32 metres	X	6.32	—
6	Tatyana Shchelkanova	Soviet Union	6.32 metres	6.32	—	
8	Hildrun Laufer	United Team of Germany	6.28 metres	X	6.28	—
8	Willye White	United States	6.28 metres	6.28	—	
10	Maria Vittoria Trio	Italy	6.18 metres	6.18	—	
11	Diana Jorgova	Bulgaria	6.11 metres	X	X	6.11
12	Tatyana Talysheva	Soviet Union	6.08 metres	6.08	—	
13	Sheila Parkin	Great Britain	6.04 metres	6.04	—	
14	Oddrun Hokland	Norway	6.03 metres	5.90	5.93	6.03
15	Johanna Bijleveld	Netherlands	6.02 metres	X	6.02	—
16	Aida Chuyko	Soviet Union	6.00 metres	5.71	5.88	6.00
16	Alix Jamieson	Great Britain	6.00 metres	6.00	—	
18	Martha Watson	United States	5.94 metres	X	5.94	5.88
19	Joann Grissom	United States	5.91 metres	5.65	5.59	5.91
20	Nina Hansen	Denmark	5.89 metres	5.89	5.73	5.58
21	Sachiko Kishimoto	Japan	5.87 metres	5.87	5.80	5.70
22	Helen Frith	Australia	5.83 metres	5.83	5.71	5.83
23	Skultety Kispal	Hungary	5.69 metres	5.69	5.64	5.48
24	Chi Cheng	Taiwan	5.67 metres	5.67	5.64	X
25	Emiko Koumaru	Japan	5.66 metres	5.26	5.44	5.66
26	Evelia Farina	Argentina	5.57 metres	5.56	5.39	5.57
27	Lolita Lagrosas	Philippines	5.52 metres	5.18	5.52	5.19
28	Alice Anum	Ghana	5.45 metres	5.45	5.27	4.80
28	Han Juk-hui	South Korea	5.45 metres	5.38	5.45	5.25
30	Alicia Kaufmanas	Argentina	5.29 metres	X	X	5.29
31	Simin Safa-Mehr	Iran	5.06 metres	5.06	4.99	4.80
—	Pam Kilborn	Australia	Did not start	—		

=== Final ===
Place	Athlete	Nation	Best mark	Jump 1	Jump 2	Jump 3	Jump 4	Jump 5	Jump 6
1	Mary Rand	Great Britain	6.76 metres WR	6.59	6.56	6.57	6.63	6.76	6.61
2	Irena Kirszenstein-Szewinska	Poland	6.60 metres	5.86	6.43	6.56	6.03	6.60	X
3	Tatyana Schelkanova	Soviet Union	6.42 metres	6.21	6.09	6.42	6.34	6.39	X
4	Ingrid Becker	United Team of Germany	6.40 metres	5.97	6.24	6.34	6.25	6.38	6.40
5	Viorica Viscopoleanu	Romania	6.35 metres	X	6.35	X	6.32	X	6.32
6	Diana Jorgova	Bulgaria	6.24 metres	6.24	6.01	6.21	X	5.63	6.06
7	Hildrun Laufer	United Team of Germany	6.24 metres	6.06	6.24	6.04			
8	Helga Hoffmann	United Team of Germany	6.23 metres	6.03	6.23	X			
9	Berit Berthelsen	Norway	6.19 metres	6.19	X	6.03			
10	Tatyana Talysheva	Soviet Union	6.18 metres	6.18	6.04	6.03			
11	Aida Chuiko	Soviet Union	6.13 metres	6.13	5.53	X			
12	Willye White	United States	6.07 metres	5.90	5.65	6.07			
13	Sheila Parkin	Great Britain	6.04 metres	4.77	X	6.04			
14	Maria Vittoria Trio	Italy	5.98 metres	X	5.98	5.82			
15	Johanna Bijleveld	Netherlands	5.93 metres	5.77	5.88	5.93			
16	Oddrun Hokland	Norway	5.68 metres	5.54	5.61	5.68			
17	Alix Jamieson	Great Britain	5.65 metres	5.64	5.65	X			
