= 1962 European Athletics Championships – Women's pentathlon =

Women's pentathlon at the European Athletics Championships

The women's pentathlon at the 1962 European Athletics Championships was held in Belgrade, then Yugoslavia, at JNA Stadium on 14 September 1962.

== Medalists ==
Gold	Galina Bystrova; Soviet Union
Silver	Denise Guénard; France
Bronze	Helga Hoffmann; West Germany

== Results ==
=== Final ===
14 September

The highest mark recorded in each event is highlighted in yellow

Rank	Name	Nationality	80m H	SP	HJ	LJ	200m	Points	Notes
1st place, gold medalist(s)	Galina Bystrova	Soviet Union	10.70w	13.10	1.57	6.05	23.40w	4324 (4833)	CR
2nd place, silver medalist(s)	Denise Guénard	France	10.90	11.65	1.57	5.80	24.40w	4015 (4735)	NR
3rd place, bronze medalist(s)	Helga Hoffmann	West Germany	11.10	10.78	1.57	6.03	24.70w	3961 (4676)	
4	Ingrid Mickler	West Germany	11.40w	11.03	1.63	5.80	24.50w	3939 (4663)	
5	Mary Peters	Great Britain	11.30	13.30	1.60	5.42	25.90w	3834 (4586)	
6	Draga Stamejčič	Yugoslavia	11.00	12.44	1.48	5.68	25.50w	3807 (4544)	NR
7	Lidiya Shmakova	Soviet Union	11.60	12.21	1.60	5.74	26.10w	3784 (4526)	
8	Nina Hansen	Denmark	11.10	10.27	1.54	5.79	25.70w	3728 (4450)	NR
9	Ulla Flegel	Austria	11.80w	11.18	1.60	5.61	26.60w	3600 (4355)	
10	Ingrid Bandow	East Germany	11.90	11.91	1.48	5.48	25.70w	3536 (4304)	
	Thelma Hopkins	Great Britain	12.30	14.51				DNF	
	Gunilla Cederström	Sweden	11.80	10.05	1.48	5.07		DNF	
	Irina Press	Soviet Union	11.40w	9.98	1.63	5.36		DNF	

== Participation ==
According to an unofficial count, 13 athletes from 9 countries participated in the event.

- Austria (1)
- Denmark (1)
- East Germany (1)
- France (1)
- Soviet Union (3)
- Sweden (1)
- Great Britain (2)
- West Germany (2)
- Yugoslavia (1)
