= 1954 European Athletics Championships – Women's long jump =

Women's long jump at the European Athletics Championships

The women's long jump at the 1954 European Athletics Championships was held in Bern, Switzerland, at Stadion Neufeld on 26 August 1954.

== Medalists ==
Gold	Jean Desforges; Great Britain
Silver	Aleksandra Chudina; Soviet Union
Bronze	Elżbieta Krzesińska; Poland

== Results ==
=== Final ===
26 August

Rank	Name	Nationality	Result	Notes
1st place, gold medalist(s)	Jean Desforges	Great Britain	6.04	CR
2nd place, silver medalist(s)	Aleksandra Chudina	Soviet Union	5.93	
3rd place, bronze medalist(s)	Elżbieta Krzesińska	Poland	5.83	
4	Erika Fisch	West Germany	5.81	
5	Galina Popova	Soviet Union	5.79	
6	Maria Piątkowska	Poland	5.73	
7	Shirley Cawley	Great Britain	5.73	
8	Maria Bibro	Poland	5.63	
9	Renate Ibert	West Germany	5.63	
10	Lore Fauth	West Germany	5.53	
11	Suzanne Giotin	France	5.53	
12	Sanda Grosu	Romania	5.48	
13	Galina Segen	Soviet Union	5.46	
14	Helga Hoffmann	Saar	5.46	
15	Olga Gyarmati	Hungary	5.39	
16	Colette Drou	France	5.32	
17	Karin Mårtensson	Sweden	5.26	
18	Ursula Finger	Saar	5.24	
19	Friedrike Harasek	Austria	5.24	
20	Reinelde Knapp	Austria	5.13	
21	Sheila Hoskin	Great Britain	5.06	
22	Mieke de Graaf	Netherlands	5.03	
23	Inge Eckel	Saar	4.90	

== Participation ==
According to an unofficial count, 23 athletes from 11 countries participated in the event.

- Austria (2)
- France (2)
- Hungary (1)
- Netherlands (1)
- Poland (3)
- Romania (1)
- Saar (3)
- Soviet Union (3)
- Sweden (1)
- Great Britain (3)
- West Germany (3)
