= Erika Fisch =

German athlete (1934–2021)

Personal information
- Nationality: German
- Born: 29 April 1934 Hanover, Niedersachsen, Germany
- Died: 9 November 2021 (aged 87) Hanover, Niedersachsen, Germany

Sport
- Sport: Athletics
- Event: long jump / sprints
- Club: MTV Osterode
Medal record
Women's athletics
Representing West Germany
European Championships
Silver medal – second place	1962 Belgrade	4×100 m
Bronze medal – third place	1962 Belgrade	80 m hurdles

Erika Fisch (29 April 1934 – 9 November 2021) was a German athlete. She represented the United Team of Germany at the 1956 Summer Olympics in Melbourne, placing fourth in the long jump. At the 1962 European Championships she won silver in the 4 × 100 m relay with the West German team and tied for bronze in the 80 m hurdles.

== Biography ==
In March 1954 Fisch broke the unofficial indoor world record in women's long jump, jumping 5.95 m. (Note: The outdoor record at the time was 6.28 m by New Zealand's Yvette Williams.) At that summer's European Championships in Bern Fisch placed fourth with a jump of 5.81 m, only 2 cm behind bronze medallist Elżbieta Duńska of Poland.

Fisch was part of a German team that broke the 4 × 100 m world record (with a time of 45.1) in 1956. At the 1956 Olympics in Melbourne she injured herself in the long jump, but still placed fourth with a wind-aided 5.89 m; she was supposed to also compete in the 4 × 100 m relay, but had to sit out due to the injury. At the 1958 European Championships in Stockholm Fisch was third in the long jump qualification with a jump of 5.95 m, but only reached 5.72 m in the final and placed twelfth.

Fisch missed the 1960 Summer Olympics in Rome after breaking her leg in a skiing accident. She won two medals at the 1962 European Championships in Belgrade, silver in the 4 × 100 m relay (44.6) and bronze in the 80 m hurdles. The hurdles final was extremely close, with Fisch, Teresa Ciepły, Karin Balzer and Maria Piątkowska all running 10.6; eventually, judges announced that Ciepły had won and Balzer placed second, while Fisch and Piątkowska shared third place. In 1964 Fisch again missed out on the Olympics due to an injury.

In addition to her relay world record and long jump indoor world best, Fisch twice broke the indoor world best in the 50 m hurdles (7.1 and 7.0) and equalled the indoor world best in the 60 m hurdles (8.4) five times. In his annual rankings starting in 1956, Czechoslovak sports statistician Jan Popper ranked Fisch in the world's top ten five times in the 80 m hurdles (with a peak ranking of No. 4 in 1962) and twice in the long jump (with a peak ranking of No. 3 in 1956). Her personal best in the long jump was 6.21 m from 1958.

Fisch died on 9 November 2021, at the age of 87.
