= 1969 European Athletics Championships – Women's long jump =

Women's long jump at the European Athletics Championships

The women's long jump at the 1969 European Athletics Championships was held in Athens, Greece, at Georgios Karaiskakis Stadium on 19 September 1969.

== Medalists ==
Gold	Mirosława Sarna; Poland
Silver	Viorica Viscopoleanu; Romania
Bronze	Berit Berthelsen; Norway

== Results ==
=== Final ===
19 September

Rank	Name	Nationality	Result	Notes
1st place, gold medalist(s)	Mirosława Sarna	Poland	6.49	
2nd place, silver medalist(s)	Viorica Viscopoleanu	Romania	6.45	
3rd place, bronze medalist(s)	Berit Berthelsen	Norway	6.44	
4	Deana Yorgova	Bulgaria	6.31	
5	Tatyana Bychkova	Soviet Union	6.29	
6	Maureen Barton	Great Britain	6.28	
7	Eva Kucmanová	Czechoslovakia	6.21	
8	Kristina Hauer	East Germany	6.19	
9	Moira Walls	Great Britain	6.16	
10	Sheila Sherwood	Great Britain	6.15	
11	Sieglinde Ammann	Switzerland	6.14	
12	Meta Antenen	Switzerland	6.13	
13	Charoula Sasagianni	Greece	5.43	

== Participation ==
According to an unofficial count, 13 athletes from 10 countries participated in the event.

- Bulgaria (1)
- Czechoslovakia (1)
- East Germany (1)
- Greece (1)
- Norway (1)
- Poland (1)
- Romania (1)
- Soviet Union (1)
- Switzerland (2)
- Great Britain (3)
