= Elżbieta Krzesińska =

Polish long jumper (1934–2015)

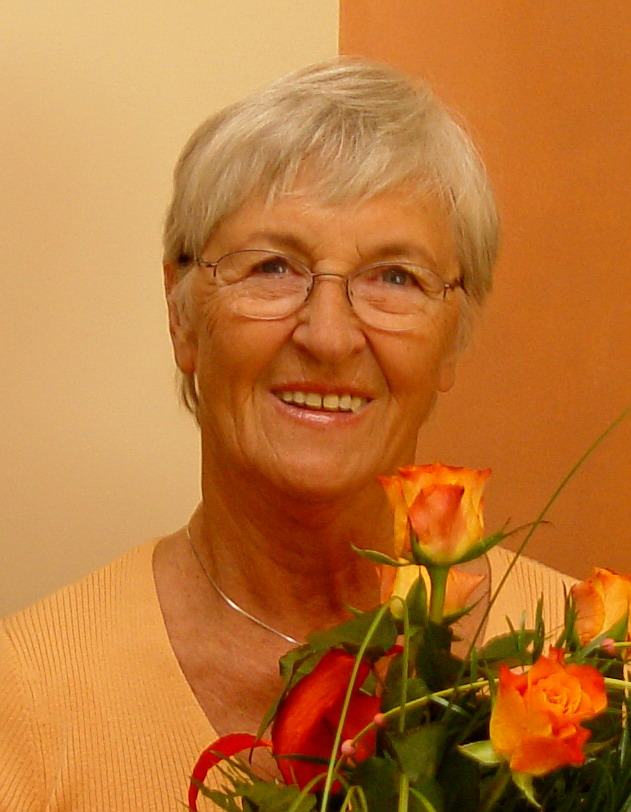

Personal information
- Born: 11 November 1934 Warsaw, Poland
- Died: 29 December 2015 (aged 81) Warsaw, Poland

Sport
- Sport: Track and field
- Events: Long jump, 80 m hurdles, sprinting
- Club: Spójnia Gdańsk (1949-1956); LKS Sopot (1957-1960); SLA Sopot-Spójnia Gdańsk (1961-1963); Skra Warszawa (1964-1965).
Medal record
Representing Poland
Olympic Games
Gold medal – first place	1956 Melbourne	Long Jump
Silver medal – second place	1960 Rome	Long Jump
European Championships
Silver medal – second place	1962 Belgrade	Long jump
Bronze medal – third place	1954 Bern	Long jump
Summer Universiade
Gold medal – first place	1959 Turin	Long jump
Silver medal – second place	1959 Turin	80m hurdles
Silver medal – second place	1961 Sofia	4x100m relay
Bronze medal – third place	1961 Sofia	Long jump

Elżbieta Maria Krzesińska (née Duńska; November 11, 1934 – December 29, 2015) was a track and field athlete from Poland, who competed in the long jump. Born in Warsaw, she competed for her native country at the 1956 Summer Olympics held in Melbourne, Australia where she won the gold medal in the Women's Long Jump. She returned to the 1960 Summer Olympics in Rome but failed to defend her title, finishing second behind Soviet Vera Krepkina.

She won the Polish championships in Long Jump (1952, 1953, 1954, 1957, 1959, 1962, 1963), 80m Hurdles (1957), and Pentathlon (1953, 1962). Duńska-Krzesińska participated in three Olympic Games. In 1952, she took 12th place in long jump at the 15th Olympic Games in Helsinki. In 1956, she won gold medal at the 16th Olympic Games in Melbourne. In 1960, she won silver medal, behind Vera Krepkina, at the 17th Olympic Games in Rome.

In 1954, she took 3rd, behind Jean Desforges, and Aleksandra Chudina, at the 5th European Championships in Athletics in Bern. In 1954, she won both in long jump and pentathlon at World Student Games in Budapest. In August 1956, she broke the world record in long jump (6.35) in Budapest, and equal in November 1956 in the Melbourne Olympics. In 1959, she won at the 1st Universiade in Turin. In 1962, she took 2nd, behind Tatyana Shchelkanova, at the 7th European Athletics Championships in Belgrade.

She was married to fellow Olympian Andrzej Krzesiński and they competed together at the 1960 Summer Olympics.

She lived in the United States of America from 1981 until 2000, then she came back to Poland. She died on 29 December 2015 after long illness.

== International competitions ==
Year	Competition	Venue	Position	Event	Notes
Representing Poland
1952	Olympic Games	Helsinki, Finland	12th	Long jump	5.65 m
1954	World Student Games	Budapest, Hungary	1st	Long jump	6.12 m
1954	World Student Games	Budapest, Hungary	1st	Pentathlon	3971 pts
1954	European Championships	Bern, Switzerland	11th (sf)	80 m hurdles	11.6 s
1954	European Championships	Bern, Switzerland	3rd	Long jump	5.83 m
1956	Olympic Games	Melbourne, Australia	1st	Long jump	6.35 m
1959	Universiade	Turin, Italy	3rd	80 m hurdles	11.5
1959	Universiade	Turin, Italy	6th	4 × 100 m relay	49.2 s
1959	Universiade	Turin, Italy	1st	Long jump	5.94 m
1960	Olympic Games	Rome, Italy	2nd	Long jump	6.27 m
1961	Universiade	Sofia, Bulgaria	–	80 m hurdles	DNF
1961	Universiade	Sofia, Bulgaria	2nd	4 × 100 m relay	47.6 s
1961	Universiade	Sofia, Bulgaria	3rd	Long jump	6.11 m
1962	European Championships	Belgrade, Yugoslavia	2nd	Long jump	6.22 m
1964	Olympic Games	Tokyo, Japan	6th	80 m hurdles	10.76 s

== Personal bests ==
- 100 metres – 12.1h (Elbląg 1962)
- 200 metres – 25.7h (Budapest 1954)
- 80 metres hurdles – 11.0h (Poznań 1961)
- High jump – 1.625 m (Olecko 1955)
- Long jump – 6.35 m (Budapest 1956)
