= Miyuki Takahashi =

Miyuki Takahashi may refer to:

- Miyuki Takahashi (volleyball)
- Miyuki Takahashi (pentathlete)
- Miyuki Takahashi (footballer)
- Miyuki Takahashi (manga artist)
