= Vincent Bachet =

French ice hockey player

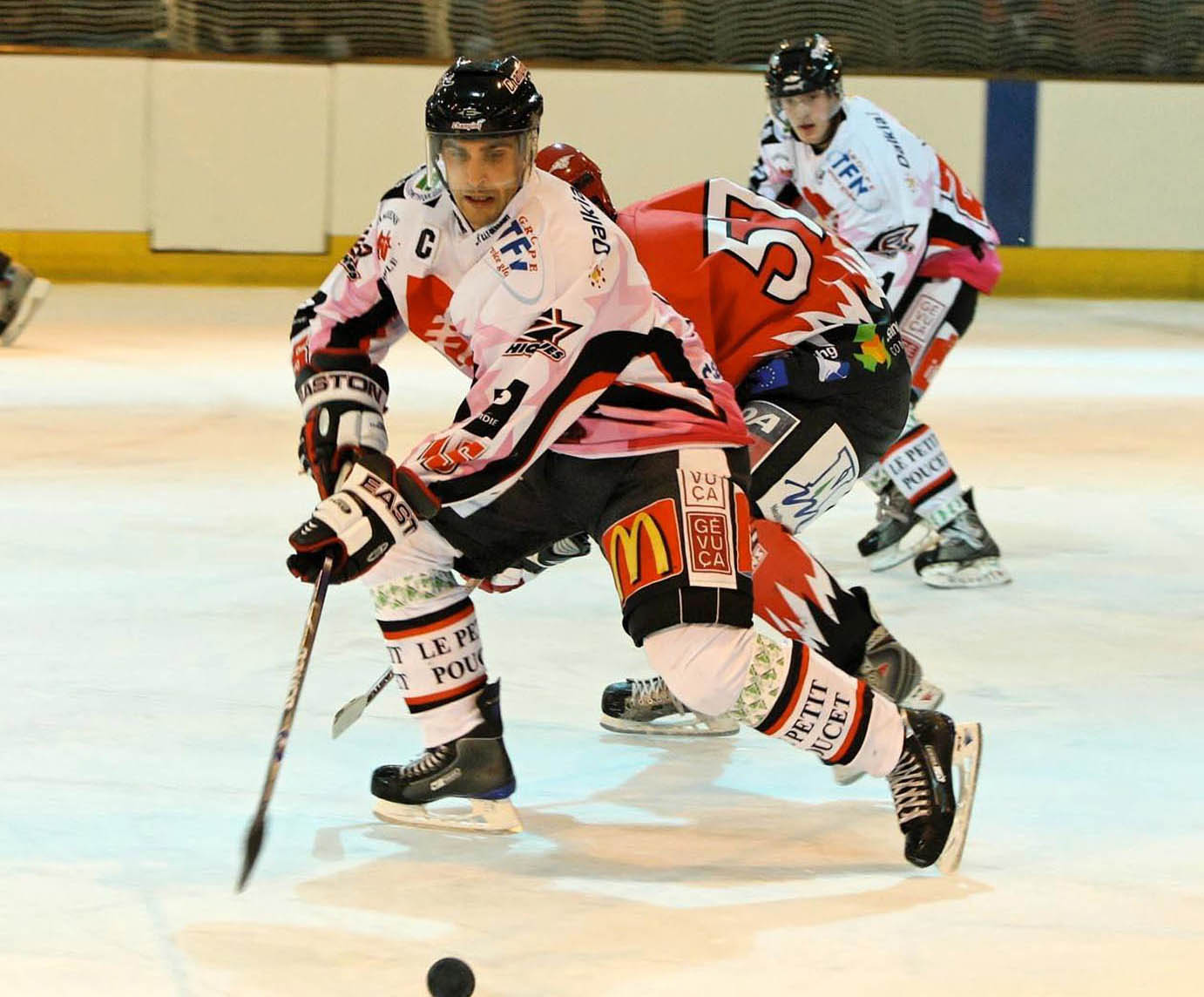
- Born: April 29, 1978 (age 46); Saint-Maurice-le-Girard, France
- Height: 5 ft 11 in (180 cm)
- Weight: 187 lb (85 kg; 13 st 5 lb)
- Position: Defence
- Shot: Left
- National team: France
- Playing career: 1996–2014

Vincent Bachet (born 29 April 1978 in Saint-Maurice-le-Girard, France) is a professional French ice hockey defenceman who participated at the 2010 IIHF World Championship as a member of the France National men's ice hockey team.
