= 1958 European Athletics Championships – Women's 80 metres hurdles =

Women's 80 metres hurdles at the European Athletics Championships

The women's 80 metres hurdles at the 1958 European Athletics Championships was held in Stockholm, Sweden, at Stockholms Olympiastadion on 20, 21, and 22 August 1958.

== Medalists ==
| Gold | Galina Bystrova; Soviet Union |
| Silver | Zenta Kopp; West Germany |
| Bronze | Gisela Birkemeyer; East Germany |

== Results ==
=== Final ===
22 August Wind: 0.4 m/s

| Rank | Name | Nationality | Time | Notes |
|---|---|---|---|---|
| 1st place, gold medalist(s) | Galina Bystrova | Soviet Union | 10.9 | |
| 2nd place, silver medalist(s) | Zenta Kopp | West Germany | 10.9 | |
| 3rd place, bronze medalist(s) | Gisela Birkemeyer | East Germany | 11.0 | |
| 4 | Carole Quinton | Great Britain | 11.0 | |
| 5 | Nelli Yeliseyeva | Soviet Union | 11.2 | |
| 6 | Wil Bakker | Netherlands | 11.5 | |

=== Semi-finals ===
21 August

==== Semi-final 1 ====
Wind: 0 m/s

| Rank | Name | Nationality | Time | Notes |
|---|---|---|---|---|
| 1 | Galina Bystrova | Soviet Union | 10.7 | CR Q |
| 2 | Zenta Kopp | West Germany | 10.9 | Q |
| 3 | Wil Bakker | Netherlands | 11.5 | Q |
| 4 | Maria Musso | Italy | 11.5 | |
| 5 | Friedl Murauer | Austria | 11.8 | |
| | Marthe Djian | France | DNF | |

==== Semi-final 2 ====
Wind: 0.4 m/s

| Rank | Name | Nationality | Time | Notes |
|---|---|---|---|---|
| 1 | Gisela Birkemeyer | East Germany | 10.8 | Q |
| 2 | Carole Quinton | Great Britain | 10.9 | Q |
| 3 | Nelli Yeliseyeva | Soviet Union | 11.0 | Q |
| 4 | Valentina Maslovskaya | Soviet Union | 11.2 | |
| 5 | Anneliese Karl | West Germany | 11.5 | |
| 6 | Miroslava Trkalová | Czechoslovakia | 11.7 | |

=== Heats ===
20 August

==== Heat 1 ====
Wind: 0.7 m/s

| Rank | Name | Nationality | Time | Notes |
|---|---|---|---|---|
| 1 | Galina Bystrova | Soviet Union | 11.1 | Q |
| 2 | Marthe Djian | France | 11.2 | Q |
| 3 | Anneliese Karl | West Germany | 11.5 | Q |
| 4 | Snezhana Zhalova | Bulgaria | 11.6 | |

==== Heat 2 ====
Wind: 1 m/s

| Rank | Name | Nationality | Time | Notes |
|---|---|---|---|---|
| 1 | Carole Quinton | Great Britain | 11.1 | Q |
| 2 | Nelli Yeliseyeva | Soviet Union | 11.1 | Q |
| 3 | Friedl Murauer | Austria | 11.4 | Q |

==== Heat 3 ====
Wind: 0.4 m/s

| Rank | Name | Nationality | Time | Notes |
|---|---|---|---|---|
| 1 | Zenta Kopp | West Germany | 11.0 | Q |
| 2 | Wil Bakker | Netherlands | 11.5 | Q |
| 3 | Miroslava Trkalová | Czechoslovakia | 11.6 | Q |

==== Heat 4 ====
Wind: 0.9 m/s

| Rank | Name | Nationality | Time | Notes |
|---|---|---|---|---|
| 1 | Gisela Birkemeyer | East Germany | 11.1 | Q |
| 2 | Valentina Maslovskaya | Soviet Union | 11.4 | Q |
| 3 | Maria Musso | Italy | 11.5 | Q |
| 4 | Milka Babović | Yugoslavia | 11.6 | |

== Participation ==
According to an unofficial count, 14 athletes from 11 countries participated in the event.

- Austria (1)
- Bulgaria (1)
- Czechoslovakia (1)
- East Germany (1)
- France (1)
- Italy (1)
- Netherlands (1)
- Soviet Union (3)
- Great Britain (1)
- West Germany (2)
- Yugoslavia (1)
