= Athletics at the 1961 Summer Universiade – Women's 100 metres =

The women's 100 metres event at the 1961 Summer Universiade was held at the Vasil Levski National Stadium in Sofia, Bulgaria, in September 1961.

== Medalists ==
Gold	Silver	Bronze
Tatyana Shchelkanova; Soviet Union	Galina Vinogradova; Soviet Union	Joan Atkinson; Great Britain

== Results ==
=== Heats ===
Rank	Heat	Name	Nationality	Time	Notes
1	1	Tatyana Shchelkanova	Soviet Union	11.87	Q
2	1	Mirosława Sałacińska	Poland	12.05	Q
3	1	Stefka Ilieva	Bulgaria	12.4	
4	1	Gisela Winckler	West Germany	12.6	
5	1	Yuko Kobayashi	Japan	12.9	
1	2	Joan Atkinson	Great Britain	11.91	Q
2	2	Hisako Tamura	Japan	12.5	Q
3	2	Uta Böge	West Germany	12.5	
4	2	Nadia Mecocci	Italy	12.6	
1	3	Galina Vinogradova	Soviet Union	12.06	Q
2	3	Miryam Sidranski	Israel	13.4	Q

=== Final ===
Rank	Athlete	Nationality	Time	Notes
1st place, gold medalist(s)	Tatyana Shchelkanova	Soviet Union	11.78	
2nd place, silver medalist(s)	Galina Vinogradova	Soviet Union	11.90	
3rd place, bronze medalist(s)	Joan Atkinson	Great Britain	11.93	
4	Mirosława Sałacińska	Poland	12.09	
5	Miryam Sidranski	Israel	12.4	
6	Hisako Tamura	Japan	12.5	
