= Athletics at the 1961 Summer Universiade – Women's 80 metres hurdles =

The women's 80 metres hurdles event at the 1961 Summer Universiade was held at the Vasil Levski National Stadium in Sofia, Bulgaria, in September 1961.

== Medalists ==
Gold	Silver	Bronze
Irina Press; Soviet Union	Rimma Koshelyova; Soviet Union	Snezhana Kerkova; Bulgaria

== Results ==
=== Heats ===
Rank	Heat	Name	Nationality	Time	Notes
1	1	Irina Press	Soviet Union	11.28	Q
2	1	Rossitsa Madzharska	Bulgaria	11.52	Q
3	1	Thelma Hopkins	Great Britain	11.63	Q
4	1	Sanda Grosu	Romania	11.80	
5	1	Hilke Thymm-Windh	West Germany	11.83	
	1	Elżbieta Krzesińska	Poland	DNF	
1	1	Rimma Koshelyova	Soviet Union	11.1	Q
2	1	Snezhana Kerkova	Bulgaria	11.2	Q
3	1	Hisako Tamura	Japan	11.6	Q
4	1	Fausta Galuzzi	Italy	12.0	
5	1	Hatibi Hakhire	Albania	13.3	

=== Final ===
Rank	Athlete	Nationality	Time	Notes
1st place, gold medalist(s)	Irina Press	Soviet Union	10.90	
2nd place, silver medalist(s)	Rimma Koshelyova	Soviet Union	11.01	
3rd place, bronze medalist(s)	Snezhana Kerkova	Bulgaria	11.09	
4	Rossitsa Madzharska	Bulgaria	11.48	
5	Thelma Hopkins	Great Britain	11.53	
6	Hisako Tamura	Japan	11.54	
