= Simone Brièrre =

French hurdler

Personal information
- Nationality: French
- Born: 14 June 1937 (age 89)

Sport
- Sport: Track and field
- Event: 80 metres hurdles

Simone Brièrre (born 14 June 1937) is a French hurdler. She competed in the women's 80 metres hurdles at the 1960 Summer Olympics.
