= Athletics at the 1959 Summer Universiade – Women's long jump =

The women's long jump event at the 1959 Summer Universiade was held at the Stadio Comunale di Torino in Turin on 4 September 1959.

== Results ==
Rank	Name	Nationality	Result	Notes
1st place, gold medalist(s)	Elżbieta Krzesińska	Poland	5.94	
2nd place, silver medalist(s)	Tamara Makarova	Soviet Union	5.76	
3rd place, bronze medalist(s)	Larisa Kuleshova	Soviet Union	5.71	
4	Inge Fuhrmann	West Germany	5.65	
5	Maria Ciastowska	Poland	5.65	
6	Inge Weigle	West Germany	5.42	
7	Francie Edington	Great Britain	5.39	
8	Nadia Mecocci	Italy	5.10	
9	Anita Follows	Great Britain	4.99	
10	Amalia Liechtenstein	Israel	4.88	
