= 1973 European Athletics Indoor Championships – Women's long jump =

The men's long jump event at the 1973 European Athletics Indoor Championships was held on 10 March in Rotterdam.

== Results ==
Rank	Name	Nationality	Result	Notes
1st place, gold medalist(s)	Diana Yorgova	Bulgaria	6.45	
2nd place, silver medalist(s)	Jarmila Nygrýnová	Czechoslovakia	6.30	
3rd place, bronze medalist(s)	Mirosława Sarna	Poland	6.15	
4	Nedyalka Angelova	Bulgaria	6.13	
5	Meta Antenen	Switzerland	6.08	
6	Viorica Viscopoleanu	Romania	6.04	
7	Edda Schmiedel	West Germany	5.99	
