= Lee Hak-ja =

South Korean sprinter

Personal information
- Nationality: South Korean
- Born: 2 April 1941 (age 84)

Sport
- Sport: Sprinting
- Event: 4 × 100 metres relay

Lee Hak-ja (Korean: 이학자; RR: I Hakja, born 2 April 1941) is a South Korean track and field athlete.

She competed in the women's 800 metres at the 1960 Summer Olympics. At the 1964 Summer Olympics, she competed in the women's 4 × 100 metres relay and women's pentathlon.

She married Chung Kyo-mo and immigrated to Texas, United States.
