= Mirosława Sarna =

Polish athlete

Personal information
- Born: 8 June 1942 (age 84) Łódź, Poland

Sport
- Sport: Track and field
Medal record
Representing Poland
European Championships
Gold medal – first place	1969 Athens	Long jump
European Indoor Championships
Bronze medal – third place	1970 Vienna	Long jump
Bronze medal – third place	1973 Rotterdam	Long jump
Summer Universiade
Silver medal – second place	1961 Sofia	4x100m relay
Silver medal – second place	1965 Budapest	4x100m relay

Mirosława Kazimiera Sarna (née Sałacińska; born 8 June 1942) is a Polish former track and field athlete who competed in the long jump, short sprints and the women's pentathlon. She was the gold medallist in the long jump at the 1969 European Athletics Championships and was twice a bronze medallist in that discipline at the European Athletics Indoor Championships.

An 8-time Polish national champion, she represented her country at the 1968 Summer Olympics. Her long jump best was 6.54 m (21 ft 5 1/4 in).

== Career ==
Sarna was born in Łódź to Stefana Sałacińska and Józef Sałaciński and studied at the city's XVIII high school. She took up track and field in her youth, joining the Ogniwa athletics club in 1955 and made her international debut for Poland in 1959. She continued to study during this period and ultimately gained a master's degree in physical education. She married her coach, Edmund Sarna, in 1968 and began competing under her married from that point onwards.

Sarna's first national title was in the long jump in 1964 and her performance of 6.13 m (20 ft 1 1/4 in) equalled the championship record. After that she had a national win in the women's pentathlon in 1966, amassing a score of 4332 points. She was chosen to represent Poland in that event at the 1966 European Athletics Championships and placed 15th. After a win in the 200 metres at the Polish Athletics Championships in 1967, she transitioned into a sprint and long jump specialist. A second Polish long jump title in 1968 gained her selection for the 1968 Mexico City Olympics, being one of two Polish entrants alongside Irena Szewińska. She achieved a personal best there, recording 6.47 m (21 ft 2 1/2 in) to take fifth place in the final.

The 1969 season proved to be the best of Sarna's career. She won a 200 metres/long jump double at the national championships. She was entered in three events for the 1969 European Athletics Championships in Athens: the long jump, 100 metres and the 4 × 100 metres relay. In the long jump, she again improved her best in championship competition and her mark of 6.49 m (21 ft 3 1/2 in) was enough to beat the reigning Olympic champion Viorica Viscopoleanu and secure the first and only international gold medal of her career. She reached the semi-finals of the 100 m and ran the anchor leg of the relay to bring the team of Krystyna Mandecka, Danuta Jędrejek and Urszula Jóźwik to fifth in the final.

Following her European Championships success, she won two further continental medals: at the 1970 European Athletics Indoor Championships she jumped a lifetime best of 6.54 m (21 ft 5 1/4 in) to take the bronze medal just two centimetres behind Viscopoleanu. The runner-up, Heide Rosendahl, succeeded Sarna as European champion a year later. The quality of the competition was not as high at the 1973 European Athletics Indoor Championships and despite only having a mark of 6.15 m (20 ft 2 in) she was again third on the podium, this time behind Diana Yorgova and Jarmila Nygrýnová. She also ran in the 60 metres at the 1970 edition, placing fifth.

Sarna's final national titles came in the 1973 season when she was Poland's long jump champion both indoors and outdoors. Her indoor winning mark of 6.29 m (20 ft 7 1/2 in) remained the championship record until 1978, when it was improved by Anna Włodarczyk. Sarna made the last of her 47 international appearances in the 1973 season. After retiring from the sport, she went into education as a coach and physical education teacher.

== National titles ==
- Polish Athletics Championships
  - 200 m: 1967, 1969
  - Long jump: 1964, 1968, 1969, 1973
  - Pentathlon: 1966
- Polish Indoor Championships
  - Long jump: 1973

== International competitions ==
Year	Competition	Venue	Position	Event	Notes
1961	Universiade	Sofia, Bulgaria	4th	100 metres	12.09
1961	Universiade	Sofia, Bulgaria	4th	200 metres	25.14
1961	Universiade	Sofia, Bulgaria	2nd	4 × 100 m relay	47.6
1966	European Championships	Budapest, Hungary	15th	Pentathlon	3564 pts
1968	Olympic Games	Mexico City, Mexico	5th	Long jump	6.47 m
1968	Olympic Games	Mexico City, Mexico	14th	4 × 100 m relay	53.0
1969	European Championships	Athens, Greece	1st	Long jump	6.49 m
1969	European Championships	Athens, Greece	5th (semis)	100 m	12.0
1969	European Championships	Athens, Greece	5th	4 × 100 m relay	44.7
1970	European Indoor Championships	Vienna, Austria	3rd	Long jump	6.54
1970	European Indoor Championships	Vienna, Austria	5th	60 m	7.6
1973	European Indoor Championships	Rotterdam, Netherlands	3rd	Long jump	6.15 m

== See also ==
- List of European Athletics Championships medalists (women)
