= Amy Snider =

Canadian hurdler

Personal information
- Full name: Marion Amy Snider
- Born: 26 May 1942 (age 84) Toronto, Ontario, Canada

Sport
- Sport: Track and field
- Event: 80 metres hurdles

Marion Amy Snider (born 26 May 1942) is a Canadian hurdler. She competed in the women's 80 metres hurdles at the 1964 Summer Olympics.
