= Sachiko Kishimoto =

Japanese long jumper (born 1936)

Personal information
- Nationality: Japanese
- Born: 25 April 1936 (age 89)

Sport
- Sport: Athletics
- Event: Long jump

Sachiko Kishimoto (岸本 幸子, Kishimoto Sachiko; born 25 April 1936) is a Japanese athlete. She competed in the women's long jump at the 1964 Summer Olympics.
