= Rosie Bonds =

American hurdler (born 1944)

Rosie Bonds Kreidler (born July 7, 1944) competed in the 1964 Summer Olympics for the United States in the Women's 80 metre hurdles. She finished in 1st place in the fourth heat of the first round (10.6 seconds), in 4th place in the first semifinal (10.8 seconds), and in 8th place in the final race (10.8 seconds) after crashing the second hurdle. After retiring from athletics two years later, she started a career in nursing.

She is the sister of Bobby Bonds and the aunt of Barry Bonds, Ricky Bonds and Bobby Bonds Jr.

In May 1973, Kreidler was arrested on suspicion of murdering a Wilmington, Los Angeles tavern owner. She was held for six days without being charged. She subsequently sued the city for wrongful arrest.

In 2002, the automobile in which she was traveling was rammed by a tractor-trailer, breaking her neck, back and ribs. The injury prevented her from continuing her work as a nurse. When her insurance stopped paying for physical therapy in 2005, Kreidler lived in her car and in the St. Mary's Center homeless shelter. She said she was too proud to ask family members for help. She then became an advocate for better care for seniors in Alameda County.
