= Athletics at the 1959 Summer Universiade – Women's 80 metres hurdles =

The women's 80 metres hurdles event at the 1959 Summer Universiade was held at the Stadio Comunale di Torino in Turin on 4 September 1959.

== Medalists ==
Gold	Silver	Bronze
Nelli Yelisayeva; Soviet Union	Snezhana Kerkova; Bulgaria	Elżbieta Krzesińska; Poland

== Results ==
=== Heats ===
Rank	Heat	Athlete	Nationality	Time	Notes
1	1	Nelli Yelisayeva	Soviet Union	11.3	Q
2	1	Elżbieta Krzesińska	Poland	11.6	Q
3	1	Fausta Galluzzi	Italy	11.7	Q
4	1	Gertrude Fries	Austria	12.0	
	1	Eva-Maria Hatheysen	West Germany	DQ	
1	2	Snezhana Kerkova	Bulgaria	11.5	Q
2	2	Ilsabe Heider	West Germany	11.8	Q
3	2	Maria Ciastowska	Poland	12.0	Q
4	2	Janet Simpson	Great Britain	24.6	

=== Final ===
Rank	Name	Nationality	Time	Notes
1st place, gold medalist(s)	Nelli Yelisayeva	Soviet Union	11.1	
2nd place, silver medalist(s)	Snezhana Kerkova	Bulgaria	11.4	
3rd place, bronze medalist(s)	Elżbieta Krzesińska	Poland	11.5	
4	Maria Ciastowska	Poland	11.6	
4	Ilsabe Heider	West Germany	11.6	
6	Fausta Galluzzi	Italy	12.2	
