= Goleni =

- Village
- Location within Moldova
- Coordinates: 48°12′25″N 27°26′12″E
- Country: Moldova

Government
  - Mayor: Ion Guranda (PDM)
- Elevation: 176 m (577 ft)

Population (2014 census)
  - Total: 961
- Time zone: UTC+2 (EET)
  - Summer (DST): UTC+3 (EEST)
- Postal code: MD-4630

Goleni is a village in Edineț District, Moldova.

== Notable people ==
- Maria Piątkowska (1931–2020), Polish athlete
