= Zenta Gastl-Kopp =

German hurdler

Personal information
- Nationality: German
- Born: Kreszentia „Zenta“ Gastl; 29 December 1933 (age 92) Munich
- Height: 1.75 m (5 ft 9 in)
- Weight: 62 kg (137 lb)

Sport
- Sport: Track and field
- Club: TSV 1860 München
Medal record
Women's athletics
Representing West Germany
European Championships
Silver medal – second place	1958 Stockholm	80 m hurdles

Zenta Gastl-Kopp (born as Zenta Gastl, 29 December 1933 in Munich – 17 April 2026) was a former German track and field athlete and world record holder in the women's 80 metres hurdles and two-times Olympian.

== Career ==
Between 1952 and 1964, she won five German championship titles in the 80-meter hurdles, three runner-up finishes and one third place.

On 29 July 1956, she set a world record of 10.6 seconds in the 80-metre hurdles in Frechen, Germany. The Zenta-Kopp-Gastl-Weg path was dedicated to her in Frechen in 2001.

In 1958, she won the silver medal in this discipline at the European Championships in Stockholm. In 1959 and 1960, she also became German champion in the long jump. She retired in 1964.

=== Olympic Games ===
She competed in women's 80 metres hurdles at the 1956 Summer Olympics in Melbourne and the 1960 Summer Olympics in Rome. She was eliminated in the semi-finals in both competitions.

After the birth of her twins in 1961, she took a break from competitive sport, then qualified once again for the 1964 Summer Olympics in Tokyo, but did not start.
