= Han Juk-hui =

South Korean long jumper

Personal information
- Nationality: South Korean
- Born: 8 May 1941 (age 85)

Sport
- Sport: Athletics
- Event: Long jump

Han Juk-hui (born 8 May 1941) is a South Korean athlete. She competed in the women's long jump at the 1964 Summer Olympics.

At the 17th South Korean Athletics Championships, Han broke the South Korean records in both the long jump and 4 × 100 metres relay, winning both events. In the long jump she jumped 5.45 m to break the previous 5.40 m mark, and in the 4 × 100 m she ran 50.9 seconds representing Hanjeon to break the previous record of 52.5 seconds.
