= Chung Kyo-mo =

South Korean middle-distance runner

Personal information
- Nationality: South Korean
- Born: 25 July 1938 (age 87)

Sport
- Sport: Middle-distance running
- Event: 800 metres

Chung Kyo-mo (Korean: 정교모; RR: Jeong Gyomo, born 25 July 1938) is a South Korean middle-distance runner. He competed in the men's 800 metres at the 1964 Summer Olympics.

He married Lee Hak-ja and immigrated to the Texas, United States.
