= Nikola Prodanov =

Bulgarian gymnast (born 1940)

- Никола Димитров Проданов
- Full name: Nikola Dimitrov Prodanov
- Born: 26 May 1940 (age 86) Burgas, Bulgaria
- Spouse: Diana Yorgova (m. 1964)

Gymnastics career
- Discipline: Men's artistic gymnastics
- Country represented: Bulgaria

Nikola Dimitrov Prodanov (Bulgarian: Никола Димитров Проданов, born 26 May 1940) is a Bulgarian gymnast. He competed at the 1960 Summer Olympics and the 1964 Summer Olympics.

Prodanov is married to Bulgarian athlete Diana Yorgova, whom he married on 23 October 1964 during the 1964 Summer Olympics in the Olympic village.
