= Barbara Sosgórnik =

Polish hurdler

Personal information
- Born: Barbara Gaweł; 15 July 1934 Węgierska Górka, Śląskie, Poland
- Died: 7 April 2016 (aged 81)
- Height: 167 cm (5 ft 6 in)
- Weight: 62 kg (137 lb)

Sport
- Country: Poland
- Sport: Track and field
- Event: 80 metres hurdles
- Club: Stal Bielsko (1950–1953); Stal Poznań (1954–1955); Warta Poznań (1956–1957); Górnik Zabrze (1959–1960)

Barbara Sosgórnik (née Gaweł; 15 July 1934 – 7 April 2016) was a Polish hurdler. She competed in the women's 80 metres hurdles at the 1960 Summer Olympics.

She was married to a shot putter Alfred Sosgórnik.

== International competitions ==
Year	Competition	Venue	Position	Event	Notes
Representing Poland
1960	Olympic Games	Rome, Italy	11th (sf)	80 m hurdles	11.46

== Personal bests ==
- 100 metres – 12.3h (Katowice 1955)
- 200 metres – 26.2h (Łódź 1955)
- 80 metres hurdles – 11.0h (Tula 1960)
- High jump – 1.54 metres (Warsaw 1959)
- Long jump – 5.81 metres (Berlin 1957)
