= Sieglinde Ammann =

Swiss pentathlete and long jumper (born 1946)

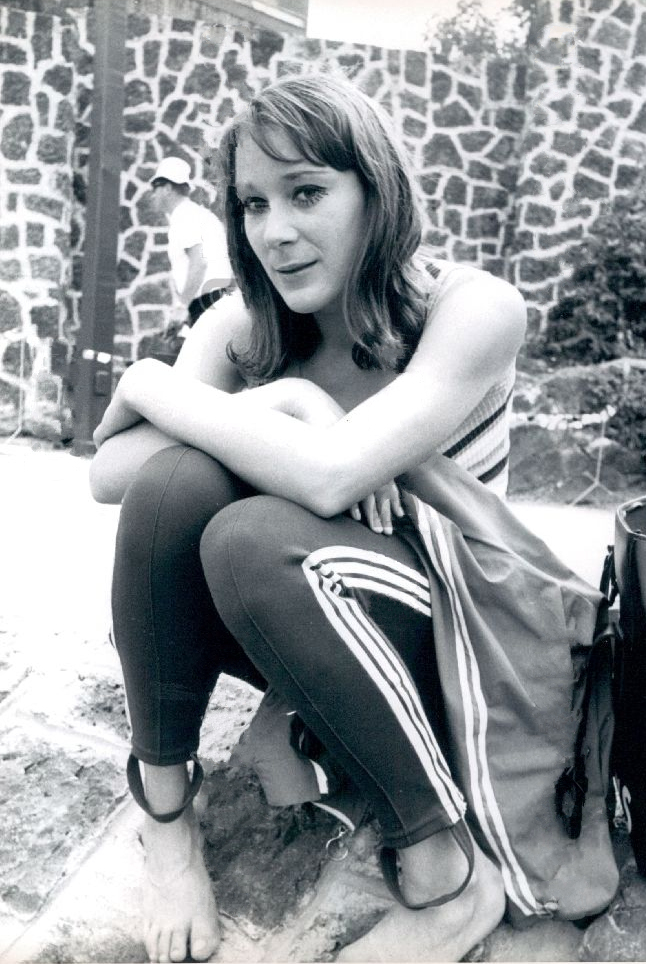
- Ammann at the 1968 Olympics

Personal information
- Born: Sieglinde Pfannerstill; 4 February 1946 (age 80) Tägerwilen, Switzerland
- Height: 178 cm (5 ft 10 in)
- Weight: 65 kg (143 lb)

Sport
- Sport: Athletics
- Events: Pentathlon, long jump
- Club: LC Zürich; LC Dübendorf; SC Liestal

Achievements and titles
- Personal best: LJ – 6.64 m (1969)

Sieglinde Ammann (née Pfannerstill; born 4 February 1946) is a retired Swiss pentathlete and long jumper. She competed at the 1968 and 1972 Summer Olympics with the best result of 17th place in the long jump in 1972. Previously Ammann finished 11th in this event at the 1969 European Championships. Her husband Ernst Ammann competed in the hammer throw at the 1968 Olympics.
