= Emiko Komaru =

Japanese long jumper

Personal information
- Nationality: Japanese
- Born: 17 November 1946 (age 78)

Sport
- Sport: Athletics
- Event: Long jump

Emiko Komaru (香丸 恵美子, Kōmaru Emiko; born November 17, 1946) is a Japanese track and field athlete. She competed in the women's long jump at the 1964 Summer Olympics.
