= Friedl Murauer =

Austrian hurdler

Personal information
- Nationality: Austrian
- Born: 4 July 1938 (age 88)

Sport
- Sport: Track and field
- Event: 80 metres hurdles

Friedl Murauer (born 4 July 1938) is an Austrian hurdler. She competed in the women's 80 metres hurdles at the 1960 Summer Olympics.
