= Maria Piątkowska =

Polish sportsperson (1931–2020)

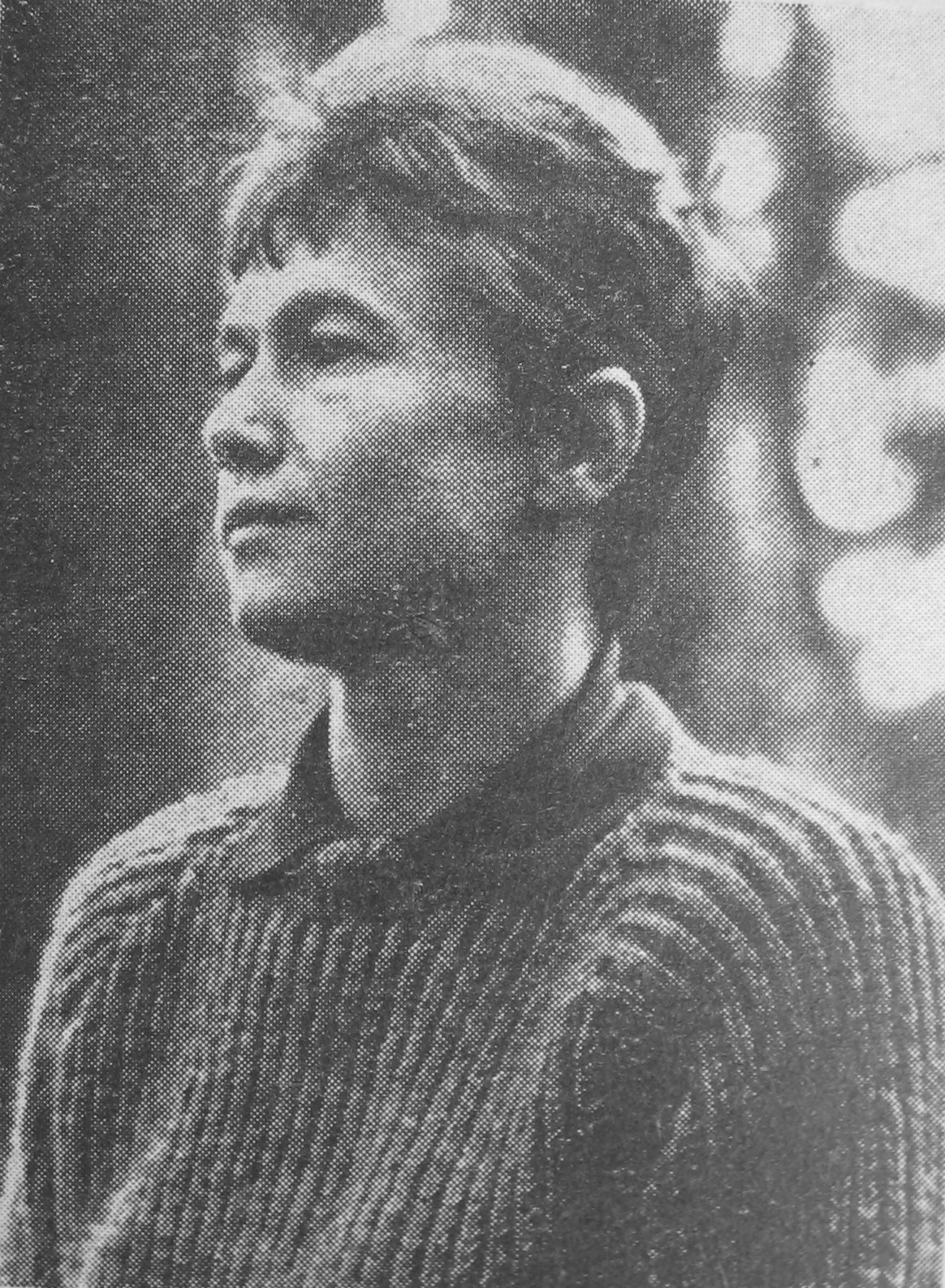
- Piątkowska in 1964

Personal information
- Born: Maria Ilwicka; 24 February 1931 Goleni, Kingdom of Romania
- Died: 19 December 2020 (aged 89) Warsaw, Poland

Sport
- Sport: Athletics
Medal record
Women's athletics
Representing Poland
European Championships
| Gold medal – first place | 1962 Belgrade | 4×100 m |
| Bronze medal – third place | 1958 Stockholm | 4×100 m |
| Bronze medal – third place | 1962 Belgrade | 80 m hurdles |

Maria Piątkowska (Polish pronunciation: [ˈmarja pjɔntˈkɔfska]; previously Chojnacka, née Ilwicka; 24 February 1931 – 19 December 2020) was a Polish sprinter, hurdler, and long jumper.

She won the 4 × 100 m relay event at the 1962 European Athletics Championships, and came third in two other European Athletics Championships events. She was Polish national champion in long jump, pentathlon, and the 80 metres running event.

== Career ==
Piątkowska was a member of Legia Warsaw athletics club, and the University Sports Association of Poland. In 1951 and 1958, she won the Polish National Championships long jump event. In 1954, she won the Polish National Championships pentathlon event, and in 1959 and 1963, she won the Polish National Championships 80 metres event.

Piątkowska competed at the Summer Olympic Games in 1952, 1960, and 1964. At the 1964 Games, she finished sixth in the 80 metres hurdles event, in a time of 10.7 seconds. Piątkowska competed at three European Athletics Championships, in 1954, 1958, and 1962. In 1958, she won a bronze medal in the 4 × 100 metres relay. At the 1962 European Athletics Championships, Piątkowska, Teresa Ciepły, Barbara Sobotta, and Elżbieta Szyroka won the 4 × 100 metres relay race. She also won a bronze medal in the 80 metres hurdles race. Piątkowska finished on the same time as winner Teresa Ciepły.

In 1961, Piątkowska set the Polish national 80 metres record of 10.7 seconds. In 1962, she ran 10.6 seconds, which equalled the national record set by Teresa Ciepły. In 1964, Piątkowska, Irena Szewińska, Halina Górecka, and Ewa Kłobukowska set the 4 × 100 metres relay world record in Łódź, Poland.

== Personal life ==
Piątkowska was born Maria Ilwicka in Goleni, Kingdom of Romania, and after the Second World War her family moved to Masuria, Poland. She was a graduate of the University of Physical Education in Warsaw. She was first married to Polish discus thrower Henryk Chojnacki. She was later married to Polish discus thrower and national record holder Edmund Piątkowski. The couple had two sons. Edmund Piątkowski died in 2016.

In 2020, Piątkowska contracted COVID-19 whilst in hospital for hip surgery. She died on 19 December 2020, aged 89.

== International competitions ==
| Year | Competition | Venue | Position | Event | Notes |
Representing Poland
| 1952 | Olympic Games | Helsinki, Finland | 12th (h) | 4 × 100 m relay | 48.21 s |
| 1952 | Olympic Games | Helsinki, Finland | 32nd (q) | Long jump | 5.09 m |
| 1954 | European Championships | Bern, Switzerland | 5th | 4 × 100 m relay | 47.1 s |
| 1954 | European Championships | Bern, Switzerland | 6th | Long jump | 5.73 m |
| 1954 | European Championships | Bern, Switzerland | 6th | Pentathlon | 3469 pts |
| 1958 | European Championships | Stockholm, Sweden | 3rd | 4 × 100 m relay | 46.0 s |
| 1958 | European Championships | Stockholm, Sweden | 6th | Long jump | 5.97 m |
| 1958 | European Championships | Stockholm, Sweden | 9th | Pentathlon | 3659 pts |
| 1960 | Olympic Games | Rome, Italy | 11th | Long jump | 5.98 m |
| 1962 | European Championships | Belgrade, Yugoslavia | 3rd | 80 m hurdles | 10.6 s |
| 1962 | European Championships | Belgrade, Yugoslavia | 1st | 4 × 100 m relay | 44.5 s |
| 1964 | Olympic Games | Tokyo, Japan | 6th | 80 m hurdles | 10.76 s |

== Personal bests ==
- 100 metres – 11.7h (1962)
- 80 metres hurdles – 10.75 (1964)
- Long jump – 6.10 m (1959)

== See also ==
- Poles in Moldova
