= Denise Guénard =

French track and field athlete

Denise Guénard née Laborie
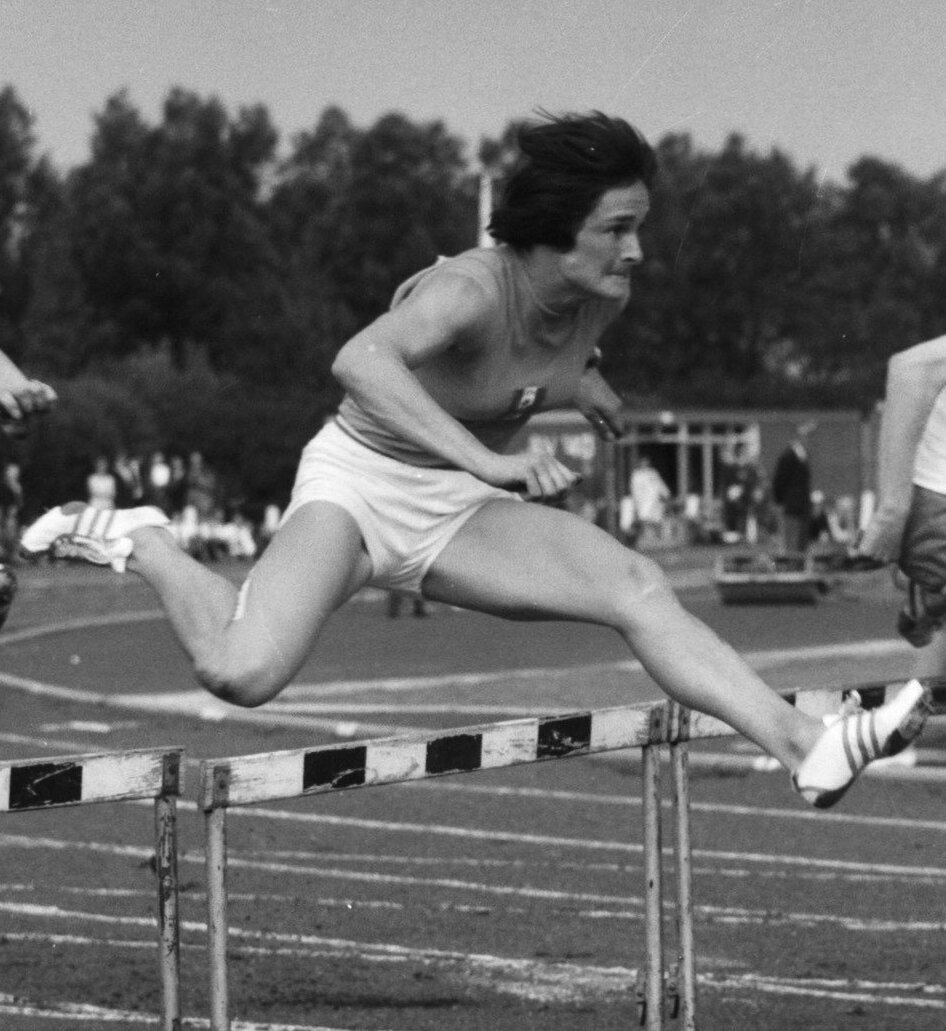

Personal information
- Nationality: French
- Born: 13 January 1934 Saint-Maurice-le-Girard, France
- Died: 23 May 2017 (aged 83) Le Kremlin-Bicêtre, Val-de-Marne, France
- Height: 168 cm (5 ft 6 in)
- Weight: 57 kg (126 lb)

Sport
- Sport: Athletics
- Event: Pentathlon / hurdles
- Club: USe Métro-Transport; US Ivry
Medal record
Women's athletics
Representing France
European Championships
Silver medal – second place	1962 Belgrade	Pentathlon

Denise Guénard née Laborie; (13 January 1934 – 23 May 2017) was a French athlete who specialised in the combined events and competed at three Olympics from 1952 to 1964.

== Biography ==
Guénard won the silver medal in the pentathlon during the 1962 European Athletics Championships, at Belgrade, with a total of 4,735 points, beaten that day by the Soviet Galina Bystrova. Guénard finished second behind Betty R. Moore in the 80 metres hurdles event at the British 1962 WAAA Championships.

Guénard was an extremely versatile athlete, having won a total of 20 individual events at French National championships in five different disciplines: the 80 metres hurdles, the high jump, the long jump, the discus throw, and the pentathlon.

She was selected 47 times for French national athletic teams.

Guénard died on 23 May 2017, aged 83.

=== Awards ===
- (silver) Silver medal in the European championships for the pentathlon in 1962
- (gold) Champion of France in 80 metre hurdles: 1954, 1955, 1960, 1961, 1962 and 1965
- (gold) France champion in the high jump: 1953, 1964
- (gold) France champion in the long jump: 1965 and 1966
- (gold) Champion of France in the discus throw: 1959
- (gold) French champion in the pentathlon: 1953, 1954, 1961, 1963, 1964, 1965, 1966, 1967 and 1968
- Participation in three Olympics: 1952, 1960 and 1964 (8th in the 4 × 100 metre women's relay in Tokyo); and in three European Championships: 1954 (4th in the 80 metre hurdles), 1962, and 1966 (8th in pentathlon)
