= Federica Galli =

Italian figurative artist

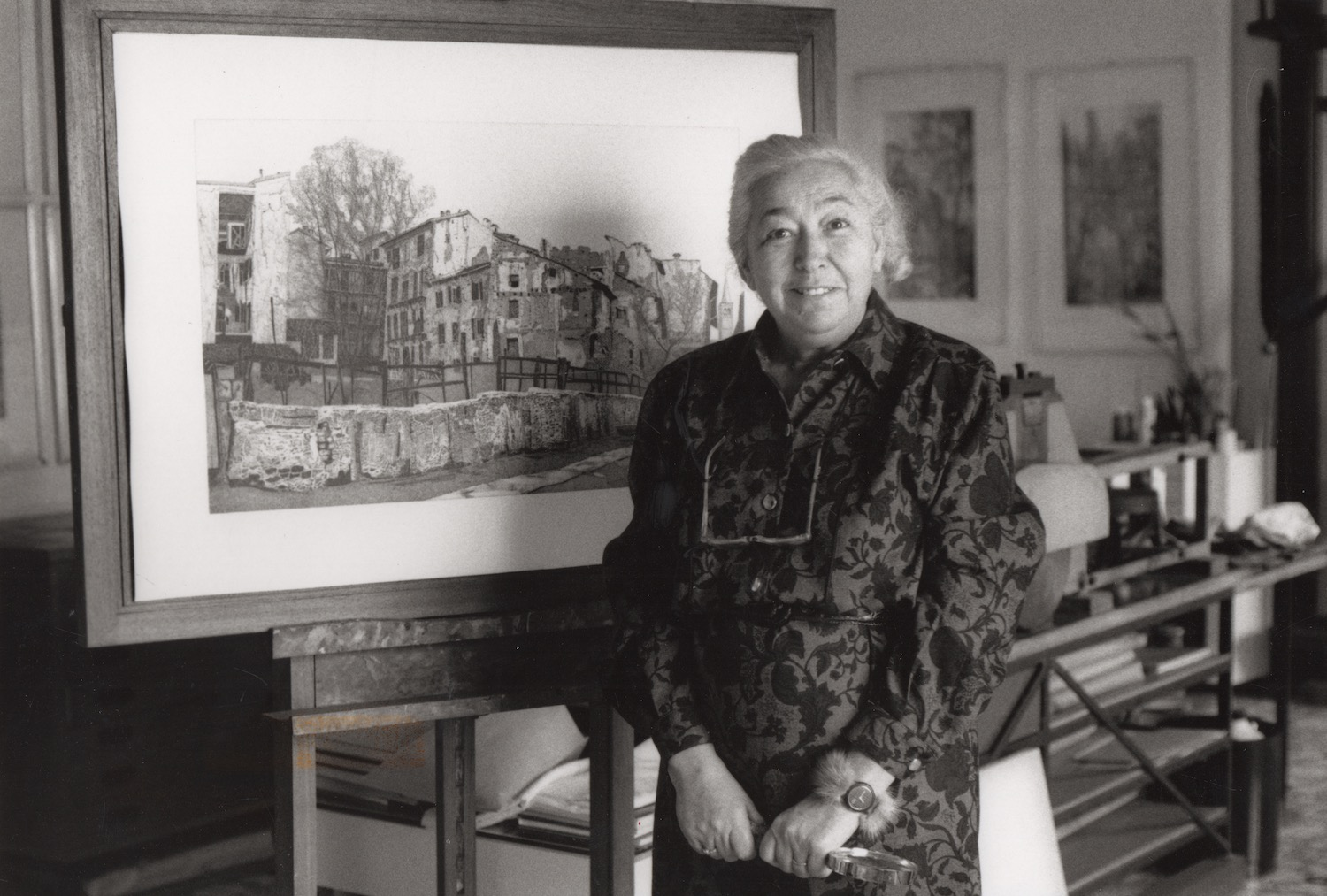
Federica Galli posing in front of her art

Federica Galli (15 August 1932 – 6 February 2009) was an Italian figurative artist known for her etchings. Her work depicts the landscapes and architecture of the Po valley, the Alps, the Mediterranean coast, Milan, and Venice, with a particular focus on the trees occupying these environments.

== Life and Training ==
Galli was born in Soresina, in the Lombardy region of Italy, in 1932. She married Giovanni Raimondi, a journalist, in 1946. In 1950, she attended the Brera Academy of fine arts in Milan, where she trained as a painter.

Galli was first drawn to etching when she visited an exhibition in Amsterdam in honour of the 350th anniversary of Rembrandt's birth. She was fascinated by his nuanced use of the technique that would form the basis for her own work. She created her first etching, Il paese dell'Alberta, in 1954. Galli's commitment to etching greatly increased in the later decades of her career, and in 1966 she decided to dedicate herself exclusively to the medium.

After her death in 2009, Galli's artistic legacy was left to the foundation in her name., where much of her work, as well as letters, books, and documentation of her numerous international connections to poets, writers, essayists, and journalists, are housed.

== Works ==
In her 50 years of activity, Galli made more than 900 etchings. Her work focuses on the landscapes and architecture of the Po valley, the Alps, the Mediterranean coast, Milan, and Venice. She is best known for her poetic interpretations of trees, for which she drew inspiration from a variety of sources, including history, literature, Milanese and Venetian culture, and botany.

In 1987, Galli was invited to display her work at the Cini Foundation in Venice, with a collection dedicated to the city. The following year, she exhibited at the Museo Civico del Palazzo Te in Mantua (1987), and at the Castello Sforzesco in Milan (1988). Galli was the first Italian female artist to be invited to exhibit in the imperial archives of the Forbidden City in China, via the Wang Fung Art Gallery, in 1995.

Her work can be found at the Museo Civico Ala Ponzone in Cremona, the Bertarelli Collection at the Castello Sforzesco in Milan, the Villa Reale in Monza, the Biblioteca Ambrosiana, and at the National Museum of Women in the Arts in Washington DC. A catalogue raisonné of her etchings was published in 2000 by gallerist Oreste Bellinzona, curated by Marco Fragonara.

In honour of the 10th anniversary of her death, Galli was added to the Famedio of the Monumental Cemetery of Milan

== Themes ==
=== "La Signora Degli Alberi" ===
Galli is best known for her depiction of the trees that occupied her environment. Over the course of her career, she became known as “La Signora degli alberi” ("The Lady of the Trees"). In 1982, she developed a cycle of prints that took her to every region of Italy to depict their typical trees. The series comprises almost 70 etchings, realised over the span of 30 years.

=== Lombardy Farmhouses ===
Galli's Cremonese origins informed her representations of the rural architecture of Lombardy. The first farmhouses to appear in her etchings are ones she knew from her childhood. Her work later evolved to portray landscapes from across the Po Valley.

=== Nature, Po Valley ===
Much of Galli's work is dedicated to nature. She surveyed most of Lombardy's forests and its countryside for sources of imagery.

=== Scenes of Venice ===
In the first half of the 1980s, Galli made a cycle of etchings featuring scenes of Venice. She spent two years studying the city before starting the project, and two years working “en plein air,” producing 39 etchings.

=== Postwar Milan ===
Galli arrived in Milan in 1954, at a time when the city still showed signs of bombings from World War II. Her work depicts both the ruins of the city and its reconstruction.

== Records ==
- Federica Galli was the first Italian female artist to be invited to exhibit in the imperial archives of the Forbidden City in China (1995);
- The first Italian female contemporary artist to be invited to the Google Arts & Culture project;
- The first Italian etcher to be acquired in the National Museum for Women in the Arts in Washington, DC.

== Honours ==
- In 1971, she was awarded an Ambrogino d’Oro, the commune of Milan's highest honour
- In 1991, she was named a Cittadino Benemerito by the Associazione Benemeriti of the Commune and Province of Milan
- In 2010, she was awarded the title of Benefactor of the city of Milan by the Mayor of Milan
- In 2011, she was included among Gianni Berengo Gardin’s portraits of the 214 most significant people in Italian modern history
- In 2018, her name was added to the Famedio of the Monumental Cemetery of Milan

== Sources ==
- Arensi, Flavio. Federica Galli, l'incanto dello sguardo, Torino: Allemandi & c., 2008.
- Berger, Daniel and Dell'Acqua, Gian Alberto. Federica Galli, with contributions from Testori, Giovanni and Salamon, Harry. Milan: Fabbri, 1990.
- Bo, Carlo. Le cascine di Federica Galli, Milan: Compagnia del Disegno, 1987.
- Cattaneo, Enrico and Grittini, Giuliano. L'acquaforte. with contributions from Luciano Prada, Corbetta: Edizioni d'Arte L'Incisione, 1990.
- De Micheli, Mario. Federica Galli, Milano: Galleria Trentadue, 1969.
- Frangi, Giuseppe and Frangi, Francesco. Federica Galli e la pittura lombarda. Preface by Mina Gregori. Milan: Compagnia del Disegno, 1984.
- Fragonara, Marco. Federica Galli, Catalogo generale 1954-2003, Milan: Oreste Bellinzona, 2003.
- Giacomoni, Sivia. "Parte prima," in Alberi monumentali di Federica Galli. Milan: Compagnia del Disegno, 1996.
- Giacomoni, Sivia. "Parte seconda," in Alberi monumentali di Federica Galli. Milan: Compagnia del Disegno, 1998.
- Landau, David. Federica Galli: Acqueforti. Milan: Compagnia del Disegno, 1982.
- Sala, Alberico. Federica Galli. Acqueforti. 2 vols. Milan: Galleria Trentadue, 1977–1979.
- Tassi, Roberto. Trentanove vedute di Venezia. Milan: Fondazione Cini, 1987.
- Testori, Giovanni. Itinerario di Fedrica Galli. Milan: Compagnia del Disegno, 1980.
- Uccello, Antonino. Gli alberi di Federica Galli. Caltanissetta: Salvatore Sciascia, 1965.
