= Miyuki Takahashi (pentathlete) =

Japanese pentathlete

Personal information
- Nationality: Japanese
- Born: 25 September 1946 (age 78)

Sport
- Sport: Athletics
- Event: Pentathlon

Miyuki Takahashi (高橋 美由紀, Takahashi Miyuki, born 25 September 1946) is a Japanese track and field athlete. She competed in the women's pentathlon at the 1964 Summer Olympics.
