= Saint-Maurice-le-Girard =

- Commune
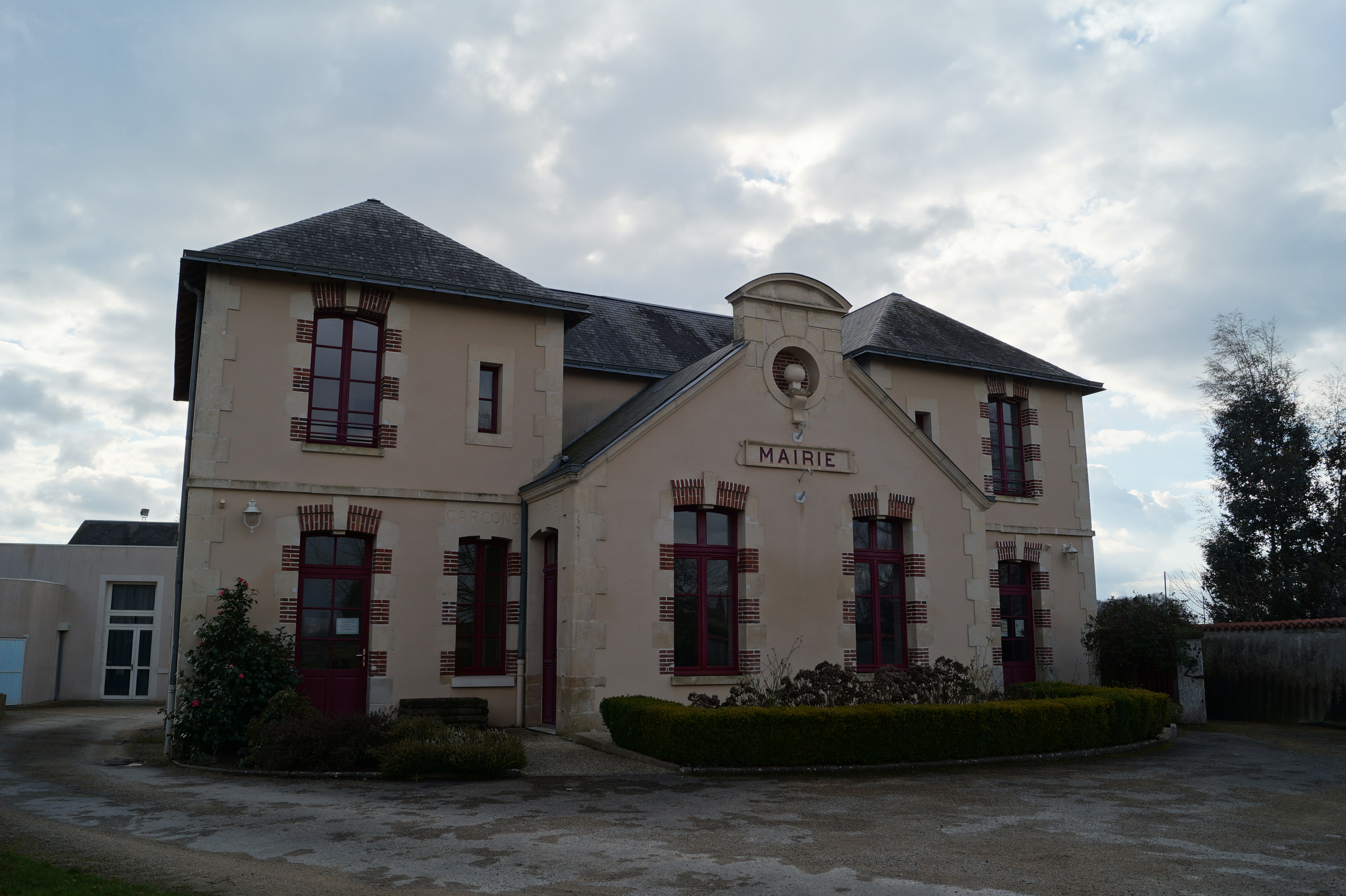

- Coat of arms
- Location of Saint-Maurice-le-Girard
- Location within France Location within Pays de la Loire
- Coordinates: 46°38′40″N 0°48′13″W
- Country: France
- Region: Pays de la Loire
- Department: Vendée
- Arrondissement: Fontenay-le-Comte
- Canton: La Châtaigneraie
- Intercommunality: Pays de la Châtaigneraie

Government
  - Mayor (2020–2026): Jean Pacteau
- Area^{1}: 11.42 km^{2} (4.41 sq mi)
- Highest elevation: 136 m (446 ft)
- Lowest elevation: 64 m (210 ft)
- Population (2023): 597
  - Density: 52.3/km^{2} (135/sq mi)
- Time zone: UTC+01:00 (CET)
  - Summer (DST): UTC+02:00 (CEST)
- INSEE/Postal code: 85252 /85390
- ^{1} French Land Register data, which excludes lakes, ponds, glaciers > 1 km^{2} (0.386 sq mi or 247 acres) and river estuaries.

Saint-Maurice-le-Girard (French pronunciation: [sɛ̃ mɔʁis lə ʒiʁaʁ]) is a commune in the Vendée department in the Pays de la Loire region in western France.

== See also ==
- Communes of the Vendée department
