= Marlène Canguio =

French athlete (1942–2025)

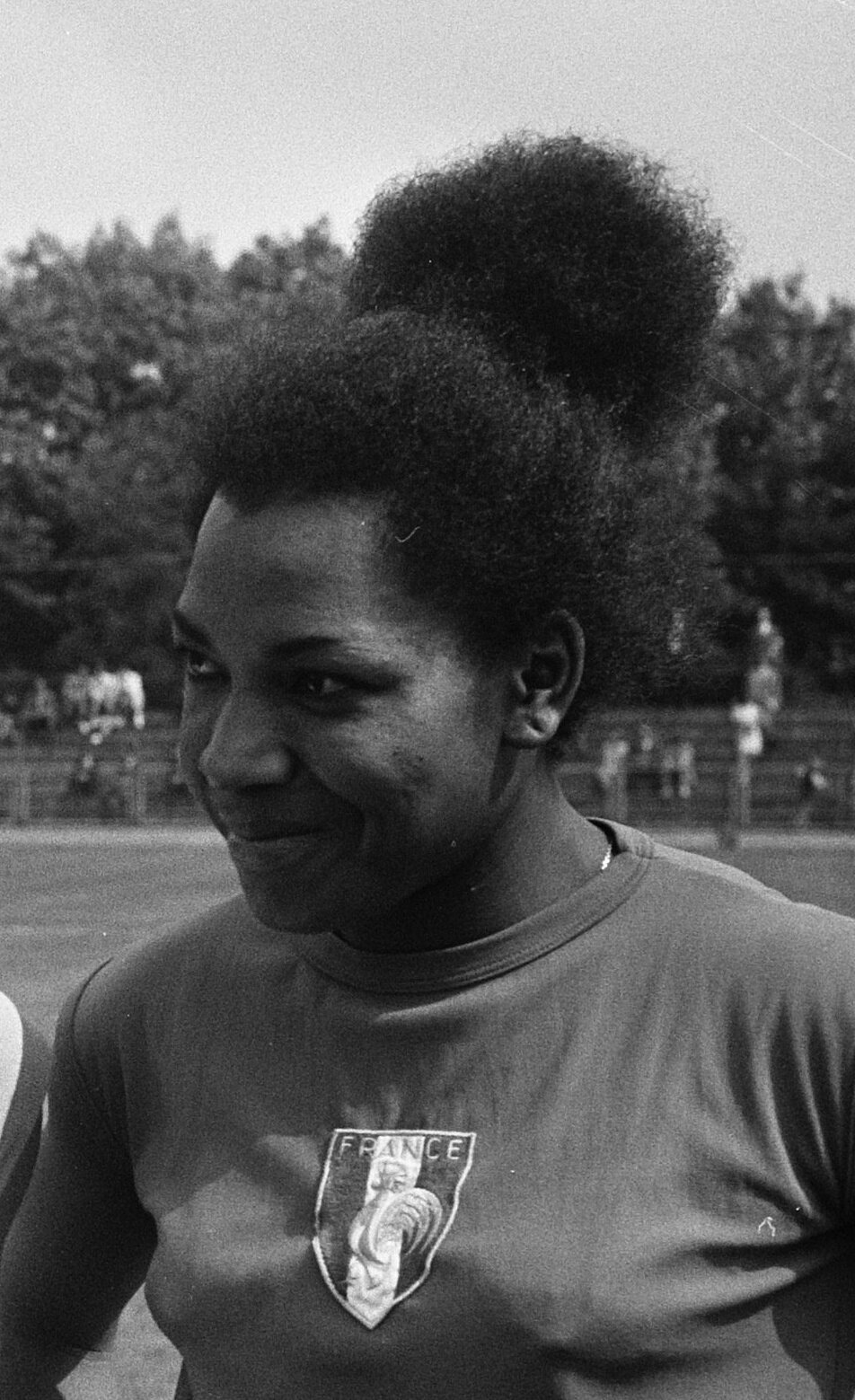
- Canguio in 1969

Personal information
- Born: 10 March 1942 Sainte-Rose, Guadeloupe, France
- Died: 25 January 2025 (aged 82)
- Height: 1.71 m (5 ft 7 in)

Sport
- Country: France
- Sport: Track and field
- Event(s): 80 metres hurdles, 100 meters hurdles, long jump
- Club: RACC Nantes et Racing club de France Paris

Marlène Canguio (10 March 1942 – 25 January 2025) was a French athlete who specialised in the hurdles.

== Biography ==
Marlene Canguio won five champion of France titles: the 80 metres hurdles in 1963 and 1964, the long jump in 1967, and 100 meters hurdles in 1969.

She is the first holder of the French record in the 100 meter hurdles (13.6 in 1969) and she also improved five times the record for the 4 × 100 Metres Relay (in 1964, 1967 and 1968).

Canguio participated in the 1964 Olympic Games in Tokyo. Eliminated in the preliminary heats of the 80 meter hurdles, she took eighth place in the 4 × 100 m relay. Selected for the games in Mexico in 1968 in several disciplines, an injury deprived her of a second Olympics.^{[ref. necessary]}

Canguio died on 25 January 2025, at the age of 82.

=== Prize list ===
- French Championships in Athletics :
  - winner of the 80m hurdles in 1963 and 1964.
  - winner of 100 m hurdles 1969.
  - winner of the long jump 1967.

=== Records ===
Personal records
Event	Performance	Place	Date
80 m hurdles	10.8 s	1964	
100 m hurdles	13.6 s	1969	
100 m	11.8 s	1964	
Long Jump	6.15 m	1969	
