= Ulla Flegel =

Austrian high jumper (1939–2026)

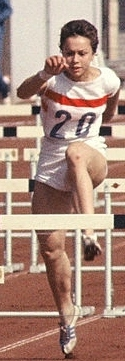
- Flegel in 1964

Personal information
- Nationality: Austrian
- Born: 22 October 1939 Linz, Reichsgau Oberdonau, Nazi Germany
- Died: 1 August 2026 (aged 86) Vienna, Austria

Sport
- Sport: Athletics
- Event: High jump

Ulla Flegel (22 October 1939 – 1 August 2026) was an Austrian athlete. She competed in the women's high jump at the 1964 Summer Olympics.

Flegel died on 1 August 2026, at the age of 86.
