= Helga Hoffmann =

German long jumper (born 1937)

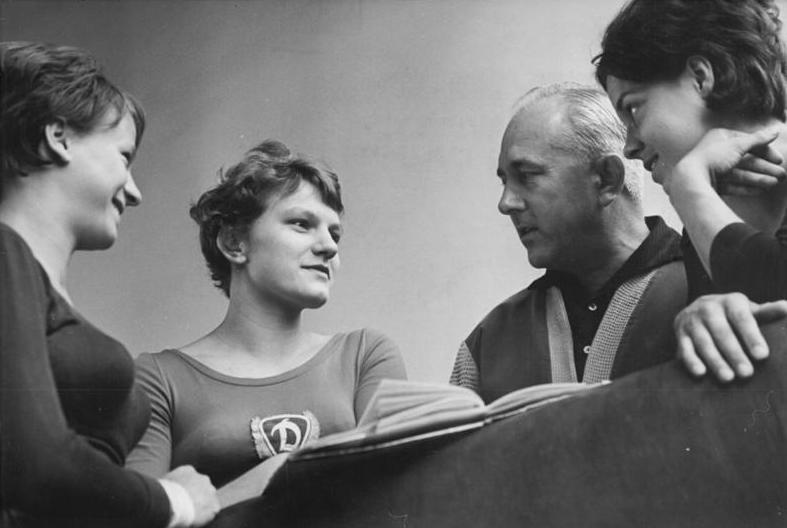
- Karin Jorcik, Birgit Radochla, Herbert Hoffmann, Helga Schildhauer

Personal information
- Nationality: German
- Born: 24 September 1937 (age 88) Saarbrücken, Saarland, Germany
- Height: 168 cm (5 ft 6 in)
- Weight: 62 kg (137 lb)

Sport
- Sport: Athletics
- Event: Long jump
- Club: ATSV Saarbrücken
Medal record
Women's athletics
Representing West Germany
European Championships
Bronze medal – third place	1962 Belgrade	Pentathlon
Bronze medal – third place	1966 Budapest	Long jump

Helga Hoffmann (German pronunciation: [ˈhɛlɡa ˈhɔfˌman]; born 24 September 1937) is a German retired track and field athlete who competed at three Olympic Games.

== Biography ==
Hoffmann competed in the women's long jump at the 1956, 1960 and the 1964 Summer Olympics.

Hoffmann finished third behind Mary Rand in the long jump event at the 1965 WAAA Championships.
