= Rimma Koshelyova =

Soviet hurdler

Personal information
- Nationality: Soviet
- Born: 1 April 1936 Nizhny Novgorod, Soviet Union
- Died: July 2023 (aged 87)

Sport
- Sport: Track and field
- Event: 80 metres hurdles
Medal record
Representing Soviet Union
Summer Universiade
Gold medal – first place	1961 Sofia	4x100m relay
Silver medal – second place	1961 Sofia	80m hurdles

Rimma Koshelyova (1 April 1936 – July 2023) was a Soviet hurdler. She competed in the women's 80 metres hurdles at the 1960 Summer Olympics.
