= Galina Bystrova =

Soviet track and field athlete

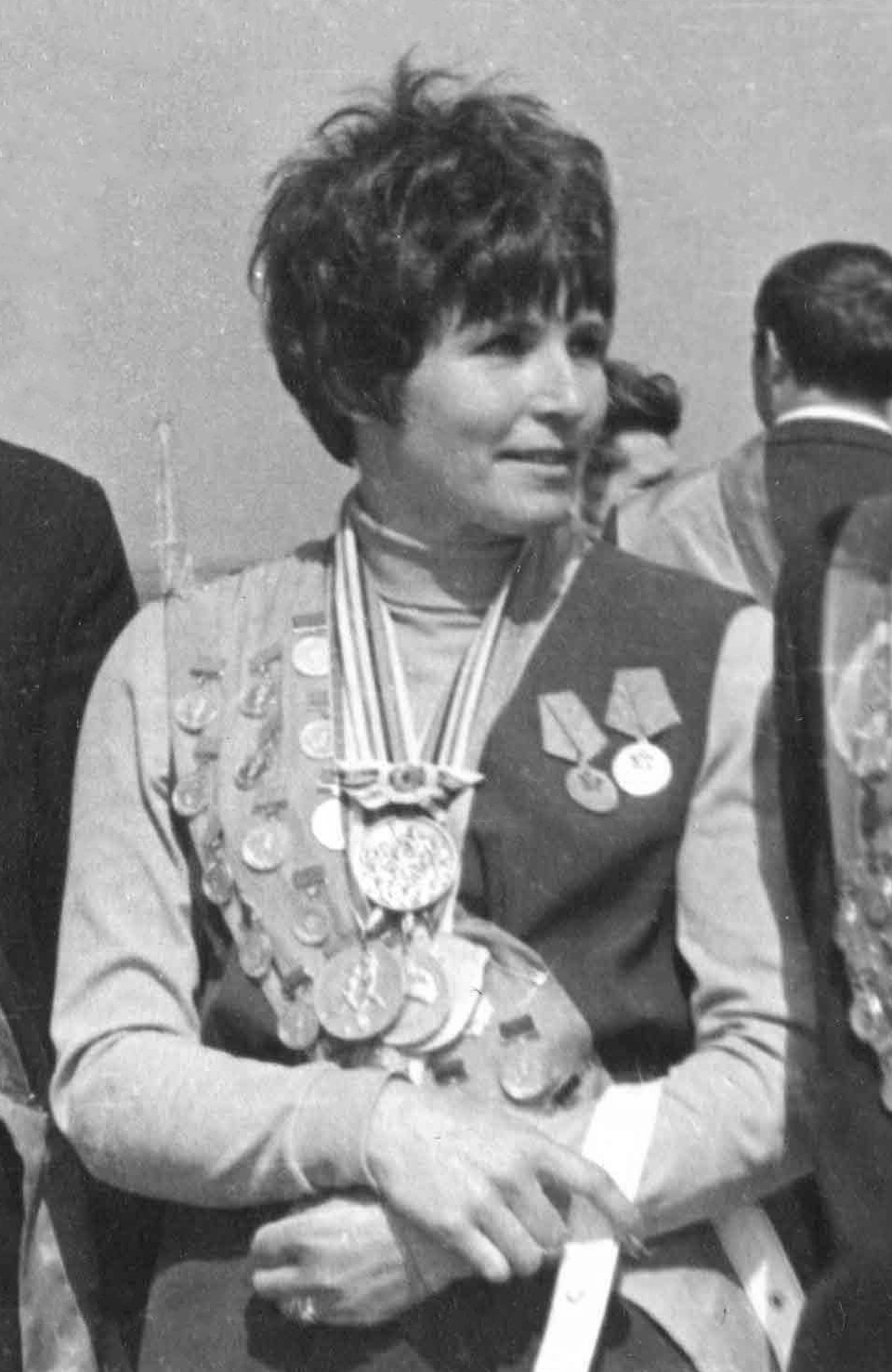
- Bystrova in 1973

Personal information
- Born: 8 February 1934 Nakhichevan, Azerbaijan SSR, Soviet Union
- Died: 11 October 1999 (aged 65) Volgograd, Russia
- Height: 1.70 m (5 ft 7 in)
- Weight: 65 kg (143 lb)

Sport
- Sport: Pentathlon, hurdles, long jump
- Club: Burevestnik, Gorky

Achievements and titles
- Personal bests: 80 mH – 10.6 (1958); LJ – 6.19 m (1962)
Medal record
Women's athletics
Representing Soviet Union
Olympic Games
Bronze medal – third place	1964 Tokyo	Pentathlon
European Championships
Gold medal – first place	1958 Stockholm	80 m hurdles
Gold medal – first place	1958 Stockholm	Pentathlon
Gold medal – first place	1962 Belgrade	Pentathlon

Galina Petrovna Bystrova (née Dolzhenkova; Russian: Галина Петровна Быстрова; 8 February 1934 – 11 October 1999) was a Soviet athlete. She competed in the 80 m hurdles at the 1956, 1960 and 1964 Olympics with the best achievement of fourth place in 1956. In 1964 she also took part in the newly introduced pentathlon event and won a bronze medal. She also won three European titles, two in the pentathlon (1958 and 1962) and one in the hurdles (1958) and set three world records in these events. Domestically she won six national titles, in the pentathlon, hurdles and long jump.

Bystrova was born to a Russian family in Azerbaijan, where her father served with the Soviet Border Guard. After his service ended, the family moved to Nizhny Novgorod, where Bystrova started training in gymnastics. In 1952 she met her future husband and athletics coach Vasily Bystrov, who convinced her to switch to athletics. After retiring from competitions, Bystrova worked as an athletics coach alongside her husband. Her last years were marred by osteoarthritis developed as a result of arduous training and by conflicts were her husband. She died aged 65.
