= Mary Rand =

English athlete (1940–2026)

Mary Rand MBE
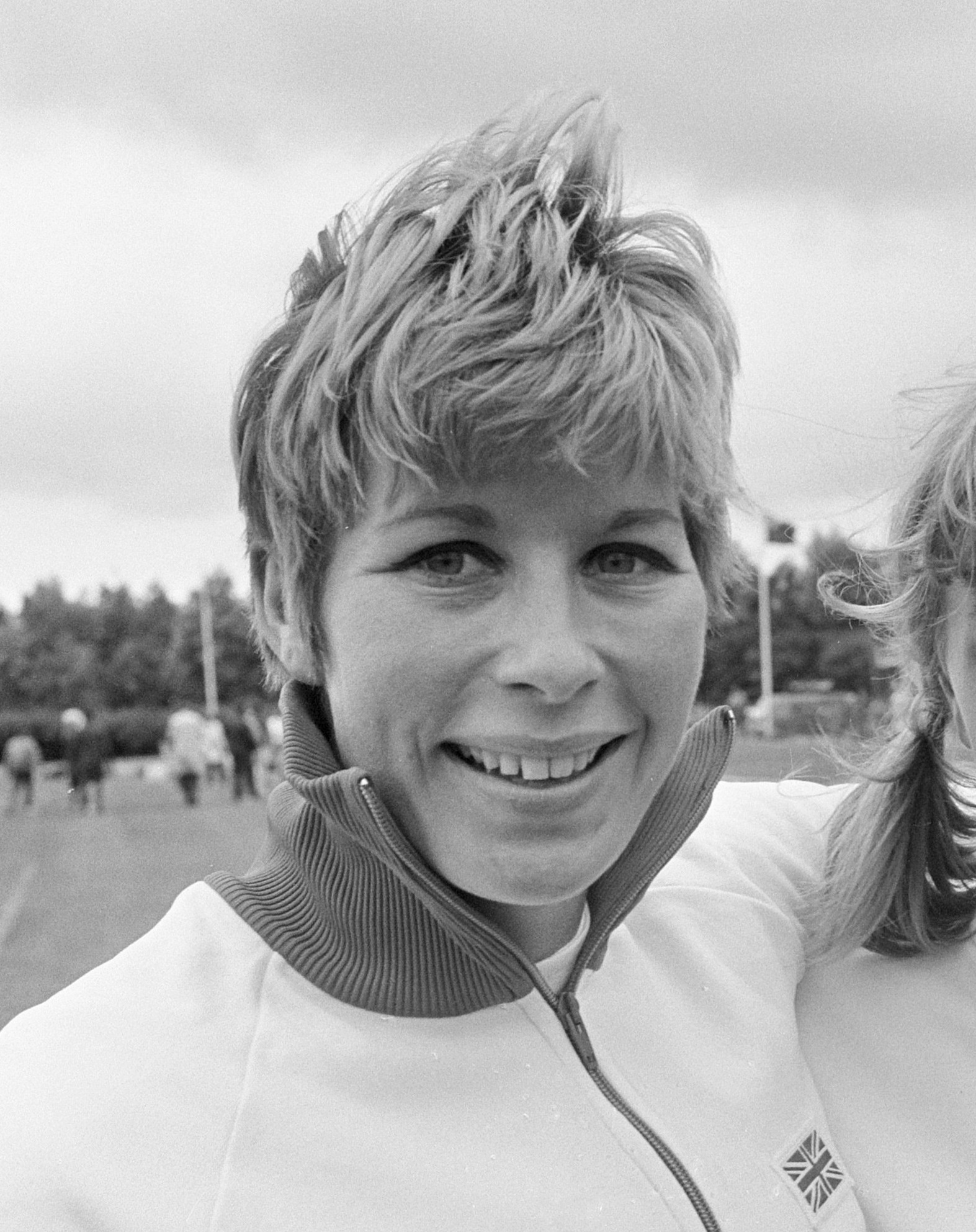
- Rand in 1966

Personal information
- Born: Mary Denise Bignal; 10 February 1940 Wells, Somerset, England
- Died: 26 March 2026 (aged 86) Reno, Nevada, US
- Height: 1.73 m (5 ft 8 in)
- Weight: 61 kg (134 lb)

Sport
- Sport: Athletics
- Events: pentathlon, long jump, high jump
- Club: London Olympiades
Medal record
Women's athletics
Representing Great Britain
Olympic Games
Gold medal – first place	1964 Tokyo	Long jump
Silver medal – second place	1964 Tokyo	Pentathlon
Bronze medal – third place	1964 Tokyo	4×100 m
European Championships
Bronze medal – third place	1962 Belgrade	Long jump
Bronze medal – third place	1962 Belgrade	4×100 m
Representing England
British Empire and Commonwealth Games
Gold medal – first place	1966 Kingston	Long jump
Silver medal – second place	1958 Cardiff	Long jump

Mary Denise Rand (née Bignal; 10 February 1940 – 26 March 2026) was an English athlete who excelled at jumping, hurdles and the pentathlon. She won the long jump at the 1964 Summer Olympics by breaking the world record, the first British female to win an Olympic gold medal in athletics. Until 2024, Rand was the only British female athlete to win three medals in a single Olympics.

== Early life ==
She was born Mary Bignal on 10 February 1940 in Wells in Somerset, where she grew up. Her father, Eric Bignal, was a chimney sweep and window cleaner while her mother, Hilda, was a nurse. Millfield School, which has educated many Olympic athletes, offered her an athletics scholarship when she was 16. She excelled in all sports and won All-England Schools' titles but was expelled for a romantic dalliance with a former pupil of the school. She was outstanding at high jump, long jump and hurdles. She was a guest of the Olympic squad at a training camp in Brighton in 1956, where she beat Britain's best high jumpers.

== Athletics career ==
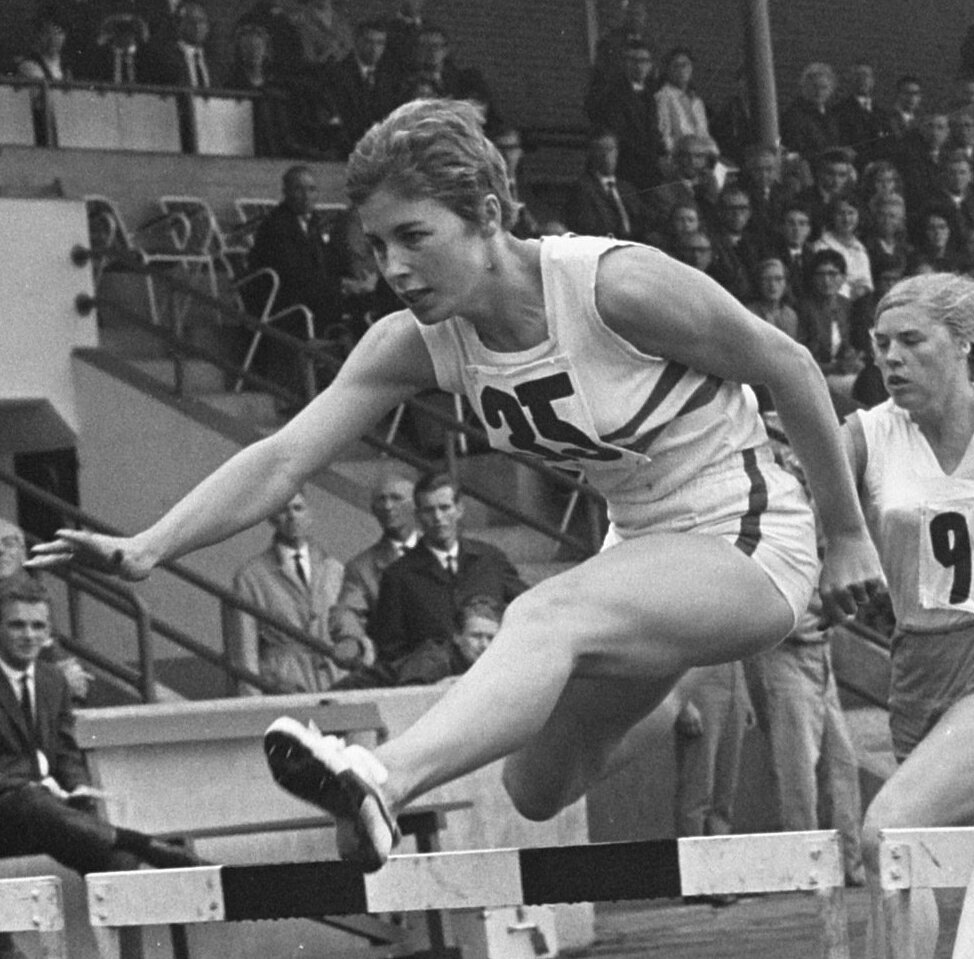
Rand in the 80m hurdles at a Netherlands versus England event at Enschede on 6 September 1964

Aged 17, she set a British record of 4,046 points in the Pentathlon. She was selected for England and won a silver medal in the 1958 Commonwealth Games for the long jump and came fifth in the high jump. One month later, she came seventh in the European pentathlon championship.

In the 1960 Olympics in Rome, she set a British record of 6.33 m in the qualifying round of the long jump, which if repeated, would have won a silver in the final. In the final, she fouled two of the three jumps and finished ninth. She also finished fourth in the 80 metres hurdles. She won a bronze medal in the European championship long jump in 1962, four months after giving birth to her daughter.

At the 1964 Olympics in Tokyo, Rand set an Olympic record in the long jump in the qualifying rounds, jumping 6.52 m. In the final she beat the favourites, world record holder Tatyana Schelkanova of the USSR and Poland's Irena Kirszenstein. Her first jump of 6.59m was a British record. However, in the fifth round, on a wet runway with a headwind of 1.6 metres a second, she broke the world record, leaping 6.76 m to take gold. Her record lasted four years until it was broken at altitude by Viorica Viscopoleanu in the 1968 Mexico City Olympics.

Rand also won the silver medal in the pentathlon, her 5,035 points putting her second in the all-time rankings. She was beaten to the gold by Irina Press, whose biological sex has been the subject of speculation. She also won a bronze as a member of the Great Britain team that finished third in the 4 × 100 metres relay.

Six days after Rand won the gold medal, her roommate Ann Packer won the 800 metres. Rand was the only British female to win three medals at a single Olympics until cyclist Emma Finucane matched her in 2024.

She won a gold in the long jump at the 1966 Commonwealth Games in Jamaica with a jump of 20 feet 10.5 inches. Due to injury to her Achilles tendon, she failed to make the 1968 British Olympic team and retired in September that year.

Rand also held the world record in the triple jump from 1959 to 1981; it was unofficial as a world record because the women's triple jump was not recognised by the International Association of Athletics Federations until 1990. She won 12 national WAAA Championships; six long jump titles (1959, 1961, 1963–1966), two high jump titles, (1958, 1959) two sprint hurdles (1959, 1966) and two pentathlon titles (1959, 1960).

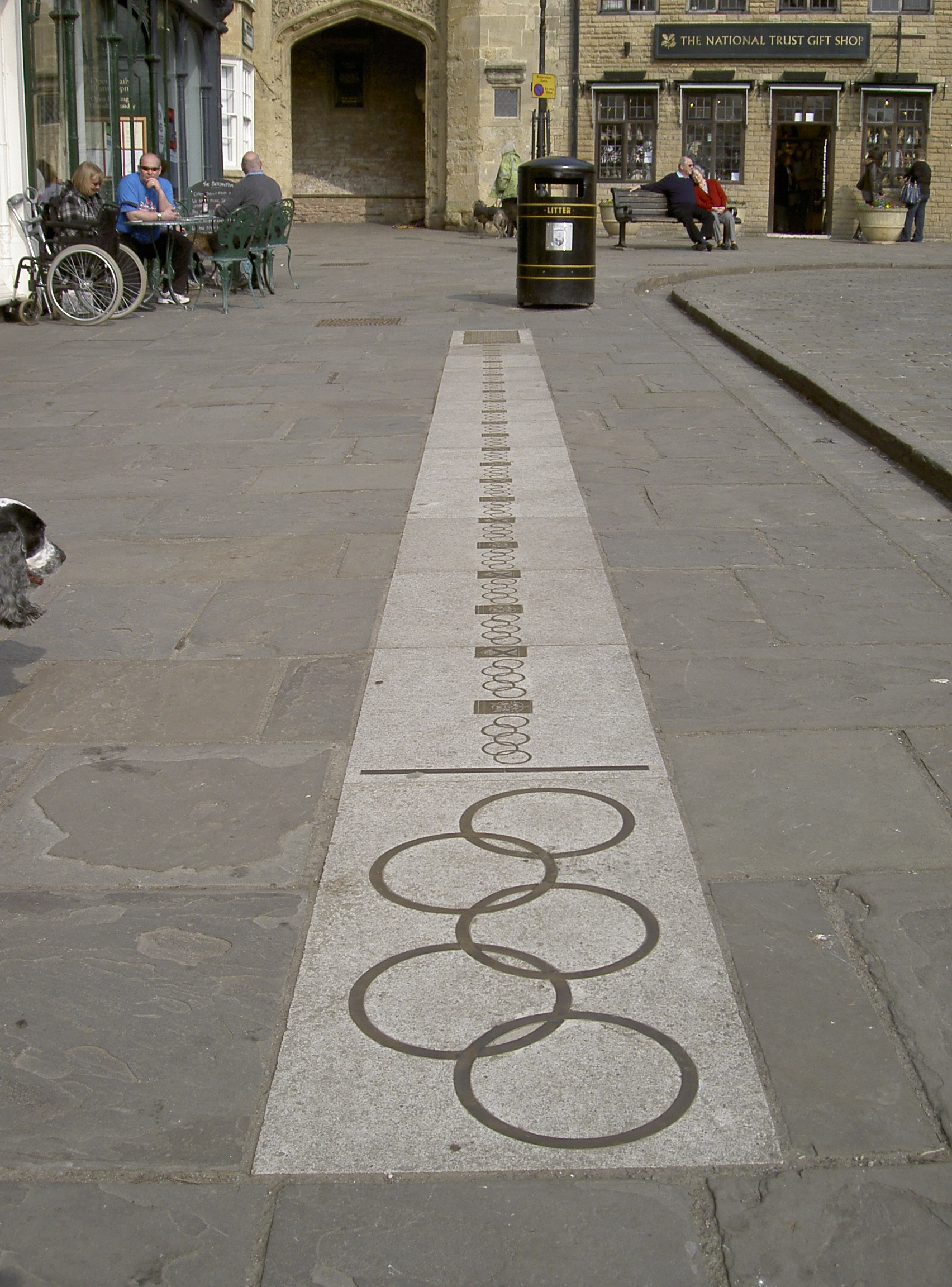
The plaque in Wells showing the distance of Rand's 1964 world record long jump of 6.76 metres (22.2 ft)

Rand was made a Member of the Order of the British Empire (MBE) in the 1965 New Year Honours for services to athletics and voted BBC Sports Personality of the Year for 1964. She wore a mini-skirt to collect her MBE medal from Queen Elizabeth II. In 2009, Rand was inducted into the England Athletics Hall of Fame. On 26 January 2012, Wells awarded her freedom of the city, following a campaign started by Wells resident Tony Williams. In the market, there is a plaque commemorating Rand's 1964 world record long jump; the distance is marked out by a row of Olympic rings set into the pavement.

== Personal life and death ==
Around 1960, Bignal dated Dutch decathlete Eef Kamerbeek. In 1961, she met rower Sid Rand. Three days after meeting, she agreed to marry him and they married five weeks later. They had a daughter. The marriage lasted five years.

In December 1969, she married her second husband, American Bill Toomey, the 1968 Olympics' decathlon champion. This marriage lasted 22 years and they had two daughters. She later married John Reese and lived with him in Atascadero, California, in the United States. She held dual UK/US citizenship.

Rand died on 26 March 2026 at an independent living facility in Reno, Nevada from acute myeloid leukaemia, aged 86. After her death Mary Peters, who was one of her roommates at the Tokyo Olympics, paid tribute to her: "She was the golden girl of her era and the most gifted athlete I ever saw."

Records
Preceded by Tatyana Shchelkanova	Women's Long Jump World Record Holder; 1964-10-14 – 1968-10-14	Succeeded by Viorica Viscopoleanu
Preceded by Rie Yamaguchi	Women's Triple Jump World Record Holder; Not officially ratified by the IAAF; 1959-06-18 – 1981-05-09	Succeeded by Terri Turner
