= Tatyana Shchelkanova =

Soviet track and field athlete (1937-2011)

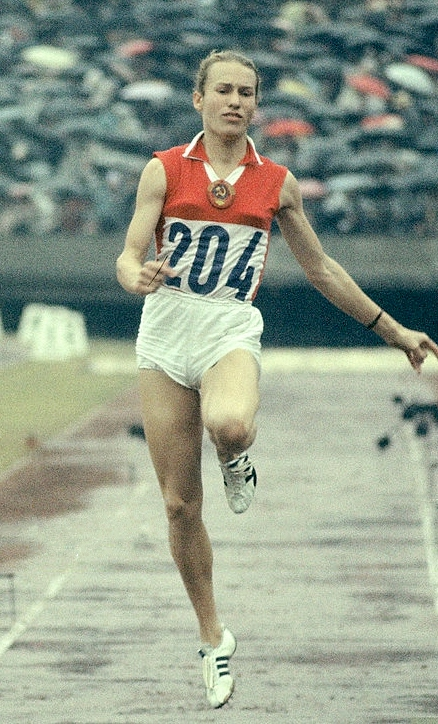
- Shchelkanova at the 1964 Olympics

Personal information
- Born: 18 April 1937 Rostov, Russian SFSR, Soviet Union
- Died: 24 November 2011 (aged 74) Saint Petersburg, Russia

Sport
- Sport: Athletics
- Events: Long jump, sprint, pentathlon
- Club: Burevestnik Leningrad
Medal record
Women's athletics
Representing the Soviet Union
Olympic Games
Bronze medal – third place	1964 Tokyo	Long jump
European Championships
Gold medal – first place	1962 Belgrade	Long jump
European Indoor Games
Gold medal – first place	1966 Westfalenhalle	Long jump
Universiade
Gold medal – first place	1961 Sofia	Long jump
Gold medal – first place	1961 Sofia	100 m
Gold medal – first place	1963 Porto Alegre	Long jump
Gold medal – first place	1965 Budapest	Long jump
Gold medal – first place	1965 Budapest	Pentathlon
Silver medal – second place	1963 Porto Alegre	80 hurdles

Tatyana Shchelkanova (Russian: Татья́на Щелка́нова, 18 April 1937 – 24 November 2011) was a Soviet long jumper, sprinter and pentathlete who won a bronze medal in the long jump at the 1964 Olympics. In 1961 she set a world record at 6.48 m and extended it to 6.53 m in 1962 to and 6.70 m in 1964. However, in the Olympic final she only managed 6.42 m, while the winner Mary Rand broke the world record at 6.76 m. Shchelkanova won two European titles in the long jump, in 1962 and 1966 (indoor).

Shchelkanova won five gold (long jump in 1961, 1963 and 1965; 100 m in 1961; and pentathlon in 1965) and one silver medal (80 hurdles in 1963) at the Summer Universiade, as well as 10 national titles in the long jump (1961–66), 4 × 100 m relay (1961–63), and pentathlon (1963). After retiring from competitions she headed a department at the St. Petersburg State University of Telecommunications.
