= Diana Yorgova =

Bulgarian long jumper (born 1942)

Personal information
- Born: 9 December 1942 (age 83) Lovech, Bulgaria

Sport
- Sport: Track and field
Medal record
Representing Bulgaria
Olympic Games
Silver medal – second place	1972 Munich	Long Jump
European Championships
Silver medal – second place	1966 Budapest	Long jump
European Indoor Championships
Gold medal – first place	1973 Rotterdam	Long jump
Summer Universiade
Silver medal – second place	1961 Sofia	Long jump
Bronze medal – third place	1961 Sofia	4x100m relay

Dianа Hristova Yorgova (Bulgarian: Диана Йоргова) (born 9 December 1942) is a former Bulgarian athlete, who competed mainly in the Long Jump. She competed for Bulgaria at the 1972 Summer Olympics held in Munich, Germany in the Long Jump where she won the silver medal. She also competed at the 1964 Summer Olympics.

Yorgova is married to Bulgarian gymnast Nikola Prodanov, whom she married during the 1964 Summer Olympics in the Olympic village.
