= Draga Stamejčič =

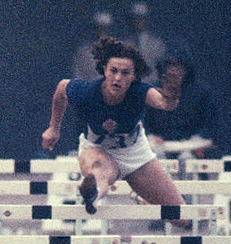
- Draga Stamejčič at the 1964 Olympics

Personal information
- Born: 27 February 1936 Ljubljana, Slovenia
- Died: August 2015
- Height: 1.67 m (5 ft 6 in)
- Weight: 66 kg (146 lb)

Sport
- Sport: Athletics
- Event(s): Hurdles, pentathlon
- Club: AK Olimpija, Ljubljana

Achievements and titles
- Personal best(s): 80 mH – 10.73 (1964); Pentathlon – 4790 (1964)

Draga Stamejčič (Cyrillic: Драга Стамејчић, 27 February 1937 – August 2015) was a Slovenian athlete who competed at the 1960 and 1964 Olympics. In 1960 she was eliminated in the heats of the 80 m hurdles event. Two weeks before the 1964 Games she set a world record in the hurdles, but at the Olympics finished only seventh due to a knee injury. She also finished fifth in the pentathlon. The knee injury required an extensive operation and resulted in her retirement around mid-1960s. She married, gave birth to twins and devoted herself to the family. In 2012, she was inducted into the Slovenian Athletes Hall of Fame.
