= 1958 European Athletics Championships – Women's 200 metres =

Women's 200 metres at the European Athletics Championships

The women's 200 metres at the 1958 European Athletics Championships was held in Stockholm, Sweden, at Stockholms Olympiastadion on 22 and 23 August 1958.

== Medalists ==
Gold	Barbara Janiszewska; Poland
Silver	Hannelore Sadau; East Germany
Bronze	Mariya Itkina; Soviet Union

== Results ==
=== Final ===
23 August Wind: 1.8 m/s

Rank	Name	Nationality	Time	Notes
1st place, gold medalist(s)	Barbara Janiszewska	Poland	24.1	
2nd place, silver medalist(s)	Hannelore Sadau	East Germany	24.3	
3rd place, bronze medalist(s)	Mariya Itkina	Soviet Union	24.3	
4	Vera Zabelina	Soviet Union	24.6	
5	Christa Stubnick	East Germany	25.7	
	June Paul	Great Britain	DNF	

=== Semi-finals ===
22 August

==== Semi-final 1 ====
Wind: 0.5 m/s

Rank	Name	Nationality	Time	Notes
1	June Paul	Great Britain	24.0	Q
2	Hannelore Sadau	East Germany	24.1	Q
3	Johanna Bloemhof	Netherlands	24.7	
4	Letizia Bertoni	Italy	24.8	
5	Ida Németh	Hungary	25.5	
	Linda Kepp	Soviet Union	DNS	

==== Semi-final 2 ====
Wind: 0.2 m/s

Rank	Name	Nationality	Time	Notes
1	Christa Stubnick	East Germany	24.2	Q
2	Vera Zabelina	Soviet Union	24.4	Q
3	Celina Jesionowska	Poland	24.8	
4	Micheline Fluchot	France	25.0	
5	Maria van Kuik	Netherlands	25.1	
6	Olga Šikovec	Yugoslavia	25.1	

==== Semi-final 3 ====
Wind: 0 m/s

Rank	Name	Nationality	Time	Notes
1	Barbara Janiszewska	Poland	24.1	Q
2	Mariya Itkina	Soviet Union	24.2	Q
3	Inge Fuhrmann	West Germany	24.8	
4	Claire Dew	Great Britain	24.9	
5	Nannie Haase	Netherlands	24.9	
6	Ulla-Britt Johansson	Sweden	25.2	

=== Heats ===
22 August

==== Heat 1 ====
Wind: 0 m/s

Rank	Name	Nationality	Time	Notes
1	Mariya Itkina	Soviet Union	24.7	Q
2	Nannie Haase	Netherlands	25.0	Q
3	Letizia Bertoni	Italy	25.1	Q
4	Friedl Murauer	Austria	25.4	
5	Alice Merz	Switzerland	27.0	

==== Heat 2 ====
Wind: 0.7 m/s

Rank	Name	Nationality	Time	Notes
1	Christa Stubnick	East Germany	24.2	Q
2	Celina Jesionowska	Poland	24.5	Q
3	Maria van Kuik	Netherlands	24.8	Q
4	Danila Costa	Italy	25.2	

==== Heat 3 ====
Wind: 0.8 m/s

Rank	Name	Nationality	Time	Notes
1	Barbara Janiszewska	Poland	24.4	Q
2	Claire Dew	Great Britain	24.7	Q
3	Olga Šikovec	Yugoslavia	25.1	Q
4	Vivi Markussen	Denmark	25.4	

==== Heat 4 ====
Wind: 0.4 m/s

Rank	Name	Nationality	Time	Notes
1	June Paul	Great Britain	24.2	Q
2	Inge Fuhrmann	West Germany	24.7	Q
3	Linda Kepp	Soviet Union	25.0	Q
4	Alice Fischer	Switzerland	26.0	

==== Heat 5 ====
Wind: 1.1 m/s

Rank	Name	Nationality	Time	Notes
1	Hannelore Sadau	East Germany	24.1	Q
2	Vera Zabelina	Soviet Union	24.3	Q
3	Ulla-Britt Johansson	Sweden	25.3	Q
4	Elżbieta Ćmok	Poland	25.5	
5	Angèle Picado	France	25.6	

==== Heat 6 ====
Wind: 0.3 m/s

Rank	Name	Nationality	Time	Notes
1	Johanna Bloemhof	Netherlands	24.5	Q
2	Micheline Fluchot	France	24.9	Q
3	Ida Németh	Hungary	25.9	Q
4	Stella Mousouri	Greece	26.3	

== Participation ==
According to an unofficial count, 26 athletes from 15 countries participated in the event.

- Austria (1)
- Denmark (1)
- East Germany (2)
- France (2)
- Greece (1)
- Hungary (1)
- Italy (2)
- Netherlands (3)
- Poland (3)
- Soviet Union (3)
- Sweden (1)
- Switzerland (2)
- Great Britain (2)
- West Germany (1)
- Yugoslavia (1)
