= Athletics at the 1956 Summer Olympics – Women's 4 × 100 metres relay =

Women's 4 × 100 metres relay at the Games of the XVI Olympiad
- Dates: December 1, 1956 (heats, final)
- Teams: 9
- Winning time: 45.9

Medalists
1st place, gold medalist(s)		Norma Croker; Betty Cuthbert; Fleur Mellor; Shirley Strickland de la Hunty	Australia
2nd place, silver medalist(s)		Heather Armitage; Anne Pashley; June Foulds; Jean Scrivens	Great Britain
3rd place, bronze medalist(s)		Isabelle Daniels; Mae Faggs; Margaret Matthews; Wilma Rudolph	United States

Video on YouTube Official Video @1:07:45

The women's 4 × 100 metres relay was an event at the 1956 Summer Olympics in Melbourne, Australia. There were nine nations competing, with France, Poland and Canada failing to reach the final. The Australian team won in a world record time of 44.5 seconds.

== Results ==
=== Heats ===
Rank	Heat	Nation	Athletes	Time (hand)	Time (automatic)	Notes
1	1	Australia	Shirley Strickland de la Hunty, Norma Croker, Fleur Mellor, Betty Cuthbert	44.9	45.00	Q, WR
2	1	United Team of Germany	Maria Sander, Christa Stubnick, Gisela Köhler, Bärbel Mayer	44.9	45.07	Q, WR
3	2	Great Britain	Anne Pashley, Jean Scrivens, June Foulds, Heather Armitage	45.3	45.38	Q
4	2	United States	Mae Faggs, Margaret Matthews, Wilma Rudolph, Isabelle Daniels	45.4	45.52	Q
5	1	Italy	Letizia Bertoni, Milena Greppi, Giuseppina Leone, Maria Musso	45.9	45.91	Q
6	2	Soviet Union	Vera Krepkina, Galina Rezchikova, Maria Itkina, Irina Botchkareva	46.1	46.20	Q
7	1	France	Catherine Capdeville, Micheline Fluchot, Simone Henry, Angèle Picado	46.3	46.39	
8	2	Poland	Maria Kusion, Barbara Lerczak, Genowefa Minicka, Halina Richter	46.5	46.58	
9	1	Canada	Eleanor Haslam, Dorothy Kozak, Diane Matheson, Maureen Rever	46.6	46.79	

=== Final ===
Rank	Nation	Athletes	Time (hand)	Time (automatic)	Notes
1st place, gold medalist(s)	Australia	Shirley Strickland de la Hunty, Norma Croker, Fleur Mellor, Betty Cuthbert	44.5	44.65	WR
2nd place, silver medalist(s)	Great Britain	Anne Pashley, Jean Scrivens, June Foulds, Heather Armitage	44.7	44.70	
3rd place, bronze medalist(s)	United States	Mae Faggs, Margaret Matthews, Wilma Rudolph, Isabelle Daniels	44.9	45.04	
4	Soviet Union	Vera Krepkina, Galina Rezchikova, Maria Itkina, Irina Botchkareva	45.6	45.81	
5	Italy	Letizia Bertoni, Milena Greppi, Giuseppina Leone, Maria Musso	45.7	45.90	
6	United Team of Germany	Maria Sander, Christa Stubnick, Gisela Köhler, Bärbel Mayer	47.2	47.29	
