= Athletics at the 1956 Summer Olympics – Women's 200 metres =

Women's 200 metres at the Games of the XVI Olympiad
- Venue: Melbourne Cricket Ground
- Date: November 29–30, 1956
- Competitors: 27 from 12 nations
- Winning time: 23.4

Medalists
| 1st place, gold medalist(s) | | Betty Cuthbert | Australia |
| 2nd place, silver medalist(s) | | Christa Stubnick | United Team of Germany |
| 3rd place, bronze medalist(s) | | Marlene Mathews-Willard | Australia |

Video on YouTube Official Video @1:04:35

The women's 200 metres competition at the 1956 Summer Olympics in Melbourne, Australia was held at the Olympic Stadium on November 29–30. The winning margin was 0.3 seconds.

== Summary ==
At home, Australia got three athletes into the final, led by already 100 metres champion Betty Cuthbert. Running in lane 5, with 100 metres silver medalist Christa Stubnick to her outside in lane 6, Cuthbert took an early lead making up the stagger on Stubnick more than 20 metres before the end of the turn. By the time they were all on the straightaway, she had a meter lead on Stubnick with no competition coming from the inside. She widened it to three metres by the finish. The race for bronze was more competitive as the other semi-final winner, June Foulds had opened up a metre lead over the other two Australians through the turn, but both were gaining. 50 metres out, Norma Croker caught Foulds marginally ahead, but Marlene Mathews-Willard continued to gain, opening up a meter on her compatriot by the finish, to take bronze. It was the same finish order as the 100 metres.

== Competition format ==
The women's 200 metres competition started with six heats, where the fastest two from each heat qualified to one of the two semifinals groups. The three fastest runners from each semifinals group advanced to the final.

== Records ==
Prior to the competition, the existing World and Olympic records were as follows.

| World record | Betty Cuthbert (AUS) | 23.2 | Sydney, Australia | September 16, 1956 |
| Olympic record | Marjorie Jackson (AUS) | 23.4 | Helsinki, Finland | July 26, 1952 |

== Results ==
=== Heats ===
Heat 1

| Rank | Name | Country | Time (hand) | Time (automatic) | Notes |
|---|---|---|---|---|---|
| 1 | Betty Cuthbert | Australia | 23.5 | 23.60 | Q |
| 2 | Mae Faggs | United States | 24.9 | 24.99 | Q |
| 3 | Diane Matheson | Canada | 25.7 | 25.86 | |
| 4 | Mary Klass | Singapore | 26.3 | 26.37 | |
| 5 | Maeve Kyle | Ireland | 26.4 | 26.57 | |

Heat 2

| Rank | Name | Country | Time (hand) | Time (automatic) | Notes |
|---|---|---|---|---|---|
| 1 | Mariya Itkina | Soviet Union | 24.1 | 24.31 | Q |
| 2 | Gisela Birkemeyer | United Team of Germany | 24.4 | 24.53 | Q |
| 3 | Wilma Rudolph | United States | 24.6 | 24.83 | |
| 4 | Genowefa Minicka | Poland | 25.0 | 25.19 | |
| — | Annie Choong | Malaya | DNS | – | |

Heat 3

| Rank | Name | Country | Time (hand) | Time (automatic) | Notes |
|---|---|---|---|---|---|
| 1 | Christa Stubnick | United Team of Germany | 24.5 | 24.58 | Q |
| 2 | Norma Croker | Australia | 24.9 | 25.10 | Q |
| 3 | Giuseppina Leone | Italy | 25.6 | 25.77 | |
| 4 | Meredith Ellis | United States | 26.3 | 26.46 | |
| — | Catherine Capdevielle | France | DNS | – | |

Heat 4

| Rank | Name | Country | Time (hand) | Time (automatic) | Notes |
|---|---|---|---|---|---|
| 1 | June Foulds | Great Britain | 23.8 | 24.00 | Q |
| 2 | Vera Yugova | Soviet Union | 24.9 | 25.13 | Q |
| 3 | Letizia Bertoni | Italy | 25.2 | 25.33 | |
| 4 | Claudette Masdammer | Guyana | 25.4 | 25.73 | |
| — | Maria Kusion | Poland | DNS | – | |

Heat 5

| Rank | Name | Country | Time (hand) | Time (automatic) | Notes |
|---|---|---|---|---|---|
| 1 | Heather Armitage | Great Britain | 24.8 | 24.87 | Q |
| 2 | Barbara Janiszewska | Poland | 24.8 | 24.99 | Q |
| 3 | Simone Henry | France | 25.0 | 25.13 | |
| 4 | Eleanor Haslam | Canada | 25.3 | 25.27 | |
| 5 | Olga Kosheleva | Soviet Union | 25.3 | 25.48 | |

Heat 6

| Rank | Name | Country | Time (hand) | Time (automatic) | Notes |
|---|---|---|---|---|---|
| 1 | Marlene Mathews-Willard | Australia | 24.0 | 24.16 | Q |
| 2 | Jean Scrivens | Great Britain | 24.3 | 24.27 | Q |
| 3 | Inge Fuhrmann | United Team of Germany | 24.7 | 25.05 | |
| 4 | Micheline Fluchot | France | 24.9 | 25.12 | |
| 5 | Maureen Rever | Canada | 26.1 | 26.17 | |

=== Semifinals ===
Group 1

| Rank | Name | Country | Time (hand) | Time (automatic) | Notes |
|---|---|---|---|---|---|
| 1 | Betty Cuthbert | Australia | 23.6 | 23.75 | Q |
| 2 | Christa Stubnick | United Team of Germany | 23.9 | 24.17 | Q |
| 3 | Norma Croker | Australia | 24.3 | 24.41 | Q |
| 4 | Maria Itkina | Soviet Union | 24.3 | 24.42 | |
| 5 | Jean Scrivens | Great Britain | 24.4 | 24.66 | |
| 6 | Barbara Janiszewska | Poland | 25.2 | 25.12 | |

Group 2

| Rank | Name | Country | Time (hand) | Time (automatic) | Notes |
|---|---|---|---|---|---|
| 1 | June Foulds | Great Britain | 24.2 | 24.36 | Q |
| 2 | Marlene Mathews-Willard | Australia | 24.3 | 24.42 | Q |
| 3 | Gisela Birkemeyer | United Team of Germany | 24.3 | 24.48 | Q |
| 4 | Heather Armitage | Great Britain | 24.7 | 24.78 | |
| 5 | Mae Faggs | United States | 24.8 | 25.06 | |
| 6 | Vera Yugova | Soviet Union | 24.9 | 25.12 | |

=== Final ===
| Rank | Name | Country | Time (hand) | Time (automatic) | Notes |
|---|---|---|---|---|---|
| 1st place, gold medalist(s) | Betty Cuthbert | Australia | 23.4 | 23.55 | WR |
| 2nd place, silver medalist(s) | Christa Stubnick | United Team of Germany | 23.7 | 23.89 | |
| 3rd place, bronze medalist(s) | Marlene Mathews-Willard | Australia | 23.8 | 24.10 | |
| 4 | Norma Croker | Australia | 24.0 | 24.22 | |
| 5 | June Foulds | Great Britain | 24.3 | 24.30 | |
| 6 | Gisela Birkemeyer | United Team of Germany | 24.3 | 24.68 | |
