= 1958 European Athletics Championships – Women's 4 × 100 metres relay =

Women's 4 × 100 metres relay at the European Athletics Championships

The women's 4 × 100 metres relay at the 1958 European Athletics Championships was held in Stockholm, Sweden, at Stockholms Olympiastadion on 23 and 24 August 1958.

== Medalists ==
Gold	Vera Krepkina; Linda Kepp; Nonna Polyakova; Valentina Maslovskaya; Soviet Union
Silver	Madeleine Weston; Dorothy Hyman; Claire Dew; Carole Quinton; Great Britain
Bronze	Maria Chojnacka; Barbara Janiszewska; Celina Jesionowska; Maria Bibro; Poland

== Results ==
=== Final ===
24 August

Rank	Nation	Competitors	Time	Notes
1st place, gold medalist(s)	Soviet Union	Vera Krepkina; Linda Kepp; Nonna Polyakova; Valentina Maslovskaya	45.3	CR
2nd place, silver medalist(s)	Great Britain	Madeleine Weston; Dorothy Hyman; Claire Dew; Carole Quinton	46.0	
3rd place, bronze medalist(s)	Poland	Maria Chojnacka; Barbara Janiszewska; Celina Jesionowska; Maria Bibro	46.0	
4	Netherlands	Johanna Bloemhof; Ine Spijk; Ria van Kuik; Joke Bijleveld	46.2	
5	Italy	Sandra Valenti; Letizia Bertoni; Maria Musso; Giuseppina Leone	46.3	
6	East Germany	Brigitte Weinmeister; Hannelore Sadau; Gisela Birkemeyer; Bärbel Mayer	46.4	

=== Heats ===
23 August

==== Heat 1 ====
Rank	Nation	Competitors	Time	Notes
1	East Germany	Brigitte Weinmeister; Hannelore Sadau; Gisela Birkemeyer; Bärbel Mayer	45.9	Q
2	Italy	Sandra Valenti; Letizia Bertoni; Maria Musso; Giuseppina Leone	46.2	Q
3	Poland	Maria Chojnacka; Barbara Janiszewska; Celina Jesionowska; Maria Bibro	46.5	Q
4	Switzerland	Gretel Bolliger; Fry Frischknecht; Alice Fischer; Alice Merz	50.8	

==== Heat 2 ====
Rank	Nation	Competitors	Time	Notes
1	Soviet Union	Vera Krepkina; Linda Kepp; Nonna Polyakova; Valentina Maslovskaya	45.7	CR Q
2	Netherlands	Johanna Bloemhof; Ine Spijk; Ria van Kuik; Joke Bijleveld	46.1	Q
3	Great Britain	Madeleine Weston; Dorothy Hyman; Claire Dew; Carole Quinton	46.3	Q
4	Sweden	Maj-Lena Lundström; Marianne Johansson; Ulla-Britt Johansson; Britt Mårtensson	47.3	
	France	Françoise Piccardy; Juliette Angenieux; Micheline Fluchot; Catherine Capdevielle	DQ	

== Participation ==
According to an unofficial count, 36 athletes from 9 countries participated in the event.

- East Germany (4)
- France (4)
- Italy (4)
- Netherlands (4)
- Poland (4)
- Soviet Union (4)
- Sweden (4)
- Switzerland (4)
- Great Britain (4)
