= Athletics at the 1960 Summer Olympics – Women's 200 metres =

Women's 200 metres at the Games of the XVII Olympiad
- Venue: Olympic Stadium
- Dates: September 3, 1960 (heats); September 5, 1960 (semifinals and final)
- Competitors: 29 from 17 nations
- Winning time: 24.1

Medalists
1st place, gold medalist(s)		Wilma Rudolph; United States
2nd place, silver medalist(s)		Jutta Heine; United Team of Germany
3rd place, bronze medalist(s)		Dorothy Hyman; Great Britain

Official Video Highlights

The women's 200 metres sprint event at the 1960 Olympic Games took place between September 3 and September 5. The winning margin was 0.45 seconds.

== Results ==
=== Heats ===
Held on September 3 from 3pm

The top two runners in each of the six heats (blue), plus the next two fastest (pink) advanced to the semifinal round.

Heat one

Rank	Name	Nationality	Time	Notes
1	Giuseppina Leone	Italy	23.90	
2	Lucinda Williams	United States	24.10	
3	Hannelore Raepke	United Team of Germany	24.32	
4	Pat Duggan	Australia	24.80	
	Maria Ionescu	Romania	DNS	
	Snezhana Kerkova	Bulgaria	DNS	

Heat two

Rank	Name	Nationality	Time	Notes
1	Gisela Köhler-Birkemeyer	United Team of Germany	24.32	
2	Catherine Capdevielle	France	24.46	
3	Ulla-Britt Wieslander	Sweden	24.82	
4	Jean Hiscock	Great Britain	24.85	
5	Ilana Karaszyk	Israel	26.69	
	Jean Holmes	Panama	DNS	

Heat three

Rank	Name	Nationality	Time	Notes
1	Jutta Heine	United Team of Germany	24.04	
2	Norma Croker-Fleming	Australia	24.35	
3	Alena Stolzová	Czechoslovakia	24.85	
4	Lyudmila Ignatyeva	Soviet Union	24.90	
5	Valerie Morgan	New Zealand	25.39	
	Stephie D'Souza	India	DNS	

Heat four

Rank	Name	Nationality	Time	Notes
1	Barbara Lerczak-Janiszewska-Sobotta	Poland	24.08	
2	Mariya Itkina	Soviet Union	24.20	
3	Antónia Munkácsi	Hungary	24.53	
4	Mona Sulaiman	Philippines	25.98	
	Christiana Boateng	Ghana	DNS	
	Carlota Gooden	Panama	DNS	

Heat five

Rank	Name	Nationality	Time	Notes
1	Dorothy Hyman	Great Britain	23.82	
2	Celina Jesionowska	Poland	24.45	
3	Eleanor Haslam	Canada	24.63	
4	Ernestine Pollards	United States	24.64	
5	Olga Šikovec	Yugoslavia	24.95	
	Betty Cuthbert	Australia	DNS	

Heat six

Rank	Name	Nationality	Time	Notes
1	Wilma Rudolph	United States	23.30	OR
2	Valentyna Maslovska	Soviet Union	24.12	
3	Jenny Smart	Great Britain	24.12	
4	Halina Górecka	Poland	24.31	
5	Maeve Kyle	Ireland	25.06	
6	Erzsébet Heldt	Hungary	25.50	

=== Semifinals ===
Held on September 5 from 3:40pm

The fastest three runners in each of the two heats advanced to the final round.

Heat one

Rank	Name	Nationality	Time	Notes
1	Wilma Rudolph	United States	23.79	
2	Jutta Heine	United Team of Germany	24.15	
3	Barbara Lerczak-Janiszewska-Sobotta	Poland	24.36	
4	Norma Croker-Fleming	Australia	24.44	
5	Jenny Smart	Great Britain	24.74	
6	Valentina Maslovskaya	Soviet Union	24.77	
7	Catherine Capdevielle	France	25.04	

Heat two

Rank	Name	Nationality	Time	Notes
1	Giuseppina Leone	Italy	24.69	
2	Dorothy Hyman	Great Britain	24.78	
3	Mariya Itkina	Soviet Union	24.81	
4	Gisela Köhler-Birkemeyer	United Team of Germany	25.05	
5	Lucinda Williams	United States	25.14	
6	Celina Jesionowska	Poland	25.45	
	Halina Górecka	Poland	DNS	

=== Final ===
Held on September 5 at 5:10pm

Rank	Name	Nationality	Time	Notes
1st place, gold medalist(s)	Wilma Rudolph	United States	24.13	
2nd place, silver medalist(s)	Jutta Heine	United Team of Germany	24.58	
3rd place, bronze medalist(s)	Dorothy Hyman	Great Britain	24.82	
4	Mariya Itkina	Soviet Union	24.85	
5	Barbara Lerczak-Janiszewska-Sobotta	Poland	24.96	
6	Giuseppina Leone	Italy	25.01	

Key: OR = Olympic record

Note: For the only time in Olympic sprint history, every finalist ran their fastest time for the event in the heats and their slowest time in the final, owing to rain, head winds and the schedule where the finalists had less than 90 minutes rest between the semi-final and final, instead of the usual entire day.
