= 1958 European Athletics Championships – Women's 100 metres =

Women's 100 metres at the 1958 European Athletics Championships
- Venue: Stockholms Olympiastadion
- Location: Stockholm
- Dates: 20 August (heats); 21 August (semifinals & final)
- Competitors: 27 from 15 nations
- Winning time: 11.7

Medalists
| gold medal | Heather Young | Great Britain |
| silver medal | Vera Krepkina | Soviet Union |
| bronze medal | Christa Stubnick | East Germany |

The women's 100 metres at the 1958 European Athletics Championships was held in Stockholm, Sweden, at Stockholms Olympiastadion on 20 and 21 August 1958.

== Participation ==
According to an unofficial count, 27 athletes from 15 countries participated in the event.

- Austria (1)
- Denmark (1)
- East Germany (1)
- France (2)
- Greece (1)
- Italy (2)
- Netherlands (3)
- Norway (1)
- Poland (3)
- Soviet Union (3)
- Sweden (1)
- Switzerland (2)
- Great Britain (3)
- West Germany (2)
- Yugoslavia (1)

== Results ==
=== Heats ===
20 August

==== Heat 1 ====
| Rank | Name | Nationality | Time | Notes |
|---|---|---|---|---|
| 1 | Valentina Maslovskaya | Soviet Union | 11.8 | Q |
| 2 | Inge Fuhrmann | West Germany | 11.9 | Q |
| 3 | Dorothy Hyman | Great Britain | 12.0 | Q |
| 4 | Reidun Buer | Norway | 12.8 | |

==== Heat 2 ====
| Rank | Name | Nationality | Time | Notes |
|---|---|---|---|---|
| 1 | Nonna Polyakova | Soviet Union | 11.9 | Q |
| 2 | Christa Stubnick | East Germany | 11.9 | Q |
| 3 | Joke Bijleveld | Netherlands | 12.1 | Q |
| 4 | Vivi Markussen | Denmark | 12.5 | |

==== Heat 3 ====
| Rank | Name | Nationality | Time | Notes |
|---|---|---|---|---|
| 1 | Heather Young | Great Britain | 11.7 | CR, Q |
| 2 | Elżbieta Ćmok | Poland | 12.0 | Q |
| 3 | Juliette Angenieux | France | 12.2 | Q |
| 4 | Alice Fischer | Switzerland | 12.4 | |

==== Heat 4 ====
| Rank | Name | Nationality | Time | Notes |
|---|---|---|---|---|
| 1 | Madeleine Weston | Great Britain | 12.0 | Q |
| 2 | Barbara Janiszewska | Poland | 12.1 | Q |
| 3 | Britt Mårtensson | Sweden | 12.4 | Q |
| 4 | Ine Spijk | Netherlands | 12.5 | |
| 5 | Alice Merz | Switzerland | 13.4 | |

==== Heat 5 ====
| Rank | Name | Nationality | Time | Notes |
|---|---|---|---|---|
| 1 | Vera Krepkina | Soviet Union | 11.9 | Q |
| 2 | Anni Biechl | West Germany | 12.0 | Q |
| 3 | Catherine Capdevielle | France | 12.1 | Q |
| 4 | Sandra Valenti | Italy | 12.3 | |
| 5 | Olga Šikovec | Yugoslavia | 12.4 | |

==== Heat 6 ====
| Rank | Name | Nationality | Time | Notes |
|---|---|---|---|---|
| 1 | Giuseppina Leone | Italy | 12.0 | Q |
| 2 | Johanna Bloemhof | Netherlands | 12.1 | Q |
| 3 | Celina Jesionowska | Poland | 12.4 | Q |
| 4 | Friedl Murauer | Austria | 12.4 | |
| 5 | Stella Mousouri | Greece | 13.1 | |

=== Semi-finals ===
21 August

==== Semi-final 1 ====
| Rank | Name | Nationality | Time | Notes |
|---|---|---|---|---|
| 1 | Heather Young | Great Britain | 11.6 | CR, Q |
| 2 | Vera Krepkina | Soviet Union | 11.8 | Q |
| 3 | Anni Biechl | West Germany | 11.9 | |
| 4 | Catherine Capdevielle | France | 11.9 | |
| 5 | Britt Mårtensson | Sweden | 12.3 | |
| 6 | Elżbieta Ćmok | Poland | 12.3 | |
| | | | Wind: +1.7 m/s | |

==== Semi-final 2 ====
| Rank | Name | Nationality | Time | Notes |
|---|---|---|---|---|
| 1 | Christa Stubnick | East Germany | 11.8 | Q |
| 2 | Valentina Maslovskaya | Soviet Union | 11.9 | Q |
| 3 | Johanna Bloemhof | Netherlands | 12.2 | |
| 4 | Celina Jesionowska | Poland | 12.2 | |
| 5 | Dorothy Hyman | Great Britain | 12.3 | |
| 6 | Juliette Angenieux | France | 12.6 | |
| | | | Wind: +1.0 m/s | |

==== Semi-final 3 ====
| Rank | Name | Nationality | Time | Notes |
|---|---|---|---|---|
| 1 | Madeleine Weston | Great Britain | 11.7 | Q |
| 2 | Giuseppina Leone | Italy | 11.8 | Q |
| 3 | Nonna Polyakova | Soviet Union | 11.9 | |
| 4 | Inge Fuhrmann | West Germany | 12.0 | |
| 5 | Barbara Janiszewska | Poland | 12.1 | |
| 6 | Joke Bijleveld | Netherlands | 12.3 | |
| | | | Wind: +1.0 m/s | |

=== Final ===
21 August

| Rank | Name | Nationality | Time | Notes |
|---|---|---|---|---|
| 1st place, gold medalist(s) | Heather Young | Great Britain | 11.7 | |
| 2nd place, silver medalist(s) | Vera Krepkina | Soviet Union | 11.7 | |
| 3rd place, bronze medalist(s) | Christa Stubnick | East Germany | 11.8 | |
| 4 | Madeleine Weston | Great Britain | 11.8 | |
| 5 | Giuseppina Leone | Italy | 11.8 | |
| 6 | Valentina Maslovskaya | Soviet Union | 11.9 | |
| | | | Wind: -1.0 m/s | |
