= Athletics at the 1959 Summer Universiade – Women's 200 metres =

The women's 200 metres event at the 1959 Summer Universiade was held at the Stadio Comunale di Torino in Turin on 5 and 6 September 1959.

== Medalists ==
Gold	Silver	Bronze
Giuseppina Leone; Italy	Barbara Janiszewska; Poland	Lyudmila Nechayeva; Soviet Union

== Results ==
=== Heats ===
Rank	Heat	Athlete	Nationality	Time	Notes
1	1	Barbara Janiszewska	Poland	24.5	Q
2	1	Micheline Fluchot	France	25.4	Q
3	1	Helen Mason	Great Britain	25.8	
4	1	Antje Gleichfeld	West Germany	26.2	
5	1	Yael Ditkovsky	Israel	26.5	
1	2	Giuseppina Leone	Italy	24.4	Q
2	2	Snezhana Kerkova	Bulgaria	25.7	Q
3	2	Simone Henry	France	26.3	
4	2	Janet Simpson	Great Britain	26.4	
1	3	Lyudmila Nechayeva	Soviet Union	24.8	Q
2	3	Inge Fuhrmann	West Germany	25.7	Q
3	3	Anna Doro	Italy	27.0	

=== Final ===
Rank	Name	Nationality	Time	Notes
1st place, gold medalist(s)	Giuseppina Leone	Italy	23.8	NR
2nd place, silver medalist(s)	Barbara Janiszewska	Poland	24.2	
3rd place, bronze medalist(s)	Lyudmila Nechayeva	Soviet Union	24.7	
4	Inge Fuhrmann	West Germany	25.0	
5	Micheline Fluchot	France	25.4	
6	Snezhana Kerkova	Bulgaria	26.3	
