= 1962 European Athletics Championships – Women's 4 × 100 metres relay =

Women's 4 × 100 metres relay at the European Athletics Championships

The women's 4 × 100 metres relay at the 1962 European Athletics Championships was held in Belgrade, then Yugoslavia, at JNA Stadium on 15 and 16 September 1962.

== Medalists ==
Gold	Teresa Ciepły; Maria Piątkowska; Barbara Sobotta; Elżbieta Szyroka; Poland
Silver	Erika Fisch; Martha Pensberger; Maren Collin; Jutta Heine; West Germany
Bronze	Ann Packer; Dorothy Hyman; Daphne Arden; Mary Rand; Great Britain

== Results ==
=== Final ===
16 September

Rank	Nation	Competitors	Time	Notes
1st place, gold medalist(s)	Poland	Teresa Ciepły; Maria Piątkowska; Barbara Sobotta; Elżbieta Szyroka	44.5	AR
2nd place, silver medalist(s)	West Germany	Erika Fisch; Martha Pensberger; Maren Collin; Jutta Heine	44.6	NR
3rd place, bronze medalist(s)	Great Britain	Ann Packer; Dorothy Hyman; Daphne Arden; Mary Rand	44.9	NR
4	Yugoslavia	Olga Šikovec; Nadja Simic; Zdenka Leskovac; Draga Stamejčič	46.4	NR
	Soviet Union	Lyudmila Motina; Valentina Maslovskaya; Mariya Itkina; Galina Popova	DQ	
	Italy	Donata Govoni; Daniela Spampani; Letizia Bertoni; Nadia Mecocci	DQ	

=== Heats ===
15 September

==== Heat 1 ====
Rank	Nation	Competitors	Time	Notes
1	Poland	Teresa Ciepły; Maria Piątkowska; Barbara Sobotta; Elżbieta Szyroka	45.1	CR Q
2	Great Britain	Ann Packer; Dorothy Hyman; Daphne Arden; Mary Rand	45.4	Q
3	Italy	Donata Govoni; Daniela Spampani; Letizia Bertoni; Nadia Mecocci	46.6	Q
4	France	Marlène Canguio; Renée Enjalbert; Claudette Actis; Denise Guénard	52.9	

==== Heat 2 ====
Rank	Nation	Competitors	Time	Notes
1	West Germany	Renate Bronnsack; Maren Collin; Martha Pensberger; Jutta Heine	45.4	Q
2	Soviet Union	Lyudmila Motina; Valentina Maslovskaya; Mariya Itkina; Galina Popova	45.5	Q
3	Yugoslavia	Olga Šikovec; Nadja Simic; Zdenka Leskovac; Draga Stamejčič	46.7	NR Q
4	Hungary	Antónia Munkácsi; Erzsébet Heldt; Teréz Bata; Ida Such	47.1	

== Participation ==
According to an unofficial count, 33 athletes from 8 countries participated in the event.

- France (4)
- Hungary (4)
- Italy (4)
- Poland (4)
- Soviet Union (4)
- Great Britain (4)
- West Germany (5)
- Yugoslavia (4)
