= Athletics at the 1959 Summer Universiade – Women's 4 × 100 metres relay =

The women's 4 × 100 metres relay event at the 1959 Summer Universiade was held at the Stadio Comunale di Torino in Turin on 6 September 1959.

== Results ==
Rank	Nation	Athletes	Time	Notes
1st place, gold medalist(s)	Soviet Union	Nelli Yeliseyeva, Larisa Kuleshova, Tamara Makarova, Lyudmila Nechayeva	46.9	
2nd place, silver medalist(s)	Italy	Anna Doro, Fausta Galluzzi, Giuseppina Leone, Nadia Mecocci	47.5	
3rd place, bronze medalist(s)	West Germany	Ilsabe Heider, Antje Gleichfeld, Kristianne Foss, Inge Fuhrmann	48.1	
4	France	Micheline Fluchot, Nicole Gouilleux, Simone Henry, Catherine Capdevielle	48.3	
5	Great Britain	Janet Simpson, Francie Edington, Anita Follows, Helen Mason	49.2	
6	Poland	Jarosława Jóźwiakowska, Barbara Janiszewska, Elżbieta Krzesińska, Maria Ciastowska	49.2	
