= Athletics at the 1959 Summer Universiade – Women's 100 metres =

The women's 100 metres event at the 1959 Summer Universiade was held at the Stadio Comunale di Torino in Turin on 3 and 4 September 1959.

== Medalists ==
Gold	Silver	Bronze
Giuseppina Leone; Italy	Lyudmila Nechayeva; Soviet Union	Catherine Capdevielle; France

== Results ==
=== Heats ===
Rank	Heat	Athlete	Nationality	Time	Notes
1	1	Giuseppina Leone	Italy	11.8	Q
2	1	Lyudmila Nechayeva	Soviet Union	12.1	Q
3	1	Snezhana Kerkova	Bulgaria	12.4	
4	1	Kristianne Voss	West Germany	12.5	
5	1	Trude Fries	Austria	12.8	
1	2	Barbara Janiszewska	Poland	12.2	Q
2	2	Tamara Makarova	Soviet Union	12.3	Q
3	2	Yael Ditkovskiy	Israel	12.8	
4	2	Anita Follows	Great Britain	12.9	
1	3	Catherine Capdevielle	France	12.0	Q
2	3	Inge Fuhrmann	West Germany	12.3	Q
3	3	Nadia Mecocci	Italy	12.4	
4	3	Helen Mason	Great Britain	12.4	
5	3	Ulla Flegel	Austria	12.8	

=== Final ===
Rank	Name	Nationality	Time	Notes
1st place, gold medalist(s)	Giuseppina Leone	Italy	11.7	
2nd place, silver medalist(s)	Lyudmila Nechayeva	Soviet Union	12.07	
3rd place, bronze medalist(s)	Catherine Capdevielle	France	12.1	
4	Barbara Janiszewska	Poland	12.2	
5	Inge Fuhrmann	West Germany	12.3	
	Tamara Makarova	Soviet Union	DNF	
