= 1962 European Athletics Championships – Women's 200 metres =

Women's 200 metres at the European Athletics Championships

The women's 200 metres at the 1962 European Athletics Championships was held in Belgrade, then Yugoslavia, at JNA Stadium on 14 and 15 September 1962.

== Medalists ==
Gold	Jutta Heine; West Germany
Silver	Dorothy Hyman; Great Britain
Bronze	Barbara Sobotta; Poland

== Results ==
=== Final ===
15 September Wind: -2.3 m/s

Rank	Name	Nationality	Time	Notes
1st place, gold medalist(s)	Jutta Heine	West Germany	23.5	CR
2nd place, silver medalist(s)	Dorothy Hyman	Great Britain	23.7	
3rd place, bronze medalist(s)	Barbara Sobotta	Poland	23.9	
4	Daphne Arden	Great Britain	24.2	
5	Valentina Maslovskaya	Soviet Union	24.2	
6	Ann Packer	Great Britain	24.4	

=== Semi-finals ===
14 September

==== Semi-final 1 ====
Wind: 0 m/s

Rank	Name	Nationality	Time	Notes
1	Barbara Sobotta	Poland	23.8	CR Q
2	Valentina Maslovskaya	Soviet Union	24.0	Q
3	Ann Packer	Great Britain	24.2	Q
4	Hannelore Raepke	East Germany	24.3	
5	Claudette Actis	France	24.5	
6	Ida Such	Hungary	25.1	

==== Semi-final 2 ====
Wind: 0 m/s

Rank	Name	Nationality	Time	Notes
1	Jutta Heine	West Germany	23.6	CR Q
2	Dorothy Hyman	Great Britain	23.7	Q
3	Daphne Arden	Great Britain	24.3	Q
4	Elżbieta Szyroka	Poland	24.7	
5	Donata Govoni	Italy	24.8	
6	Olga Šikovec	Yugoslavia	25.0	

=== Heats ===
14 September

==== Heat 1 ====
Wind: 1.3 m/s

Rank	Name	Nationality	Time	Notes
1	Valentina Maslovskaya	Soviet Union	23.8	CR Q
2	Barbara Sobotta	Poland	24.1	Q
3	Hannelore Raepke	East Germany	24.2	Q
4	Michèle Davaze	France	25.3	

==== Heat 2 ====
Wind: 1 m/s

Rank	Name	Nationality	Time	Notes
1	Dorothy Hyman	Great Britain	23.9	Q
2	Claudette Actis	France	24.7	Q
3	Ida Such	Hungary	25.1	Q

==== Heat 3 ====
Wind: 2.8 m/s

Rank	Name	Nationality	Time	Notes
1	Ann Packer	Great Britain	24.0 w	Q
2	Elżbieta Szyroka	Poland	24.1 w	Q
3	Donata Govoni	Italy	24.4 w	Q
4	Johanna Gaiser	West Germany	24.6 w	
5	Renée Enjalbert	France	25.3 w	

==== Heat 4 ====
Wind: 0.9 m/s

Rank	Name	Nationality	Time	Notes
1	Jutta Heine	West Germany	24.1	Q
2	Daphne Arden	Great Britain	24.5	Q
3	Olga Šikovec	Yugoslavia	25.1	Q
4	Therese Schueremans	Belgium	26.5	

== Participation ==
According to an unofficial count, 16 athletes from 10 countries participated in the event.

- Belgium (1)
- East Germany (1)
- France (3)
- Hungary (1)
- Italy (1)
- Poland (2)
- Soviet Union (1)
- Great Britain (3)
- West Germany (2)
- Yugoslavia (1)
