= Barbara Sobotta-Janiszewska =

Polish sprinter (1936–2000)

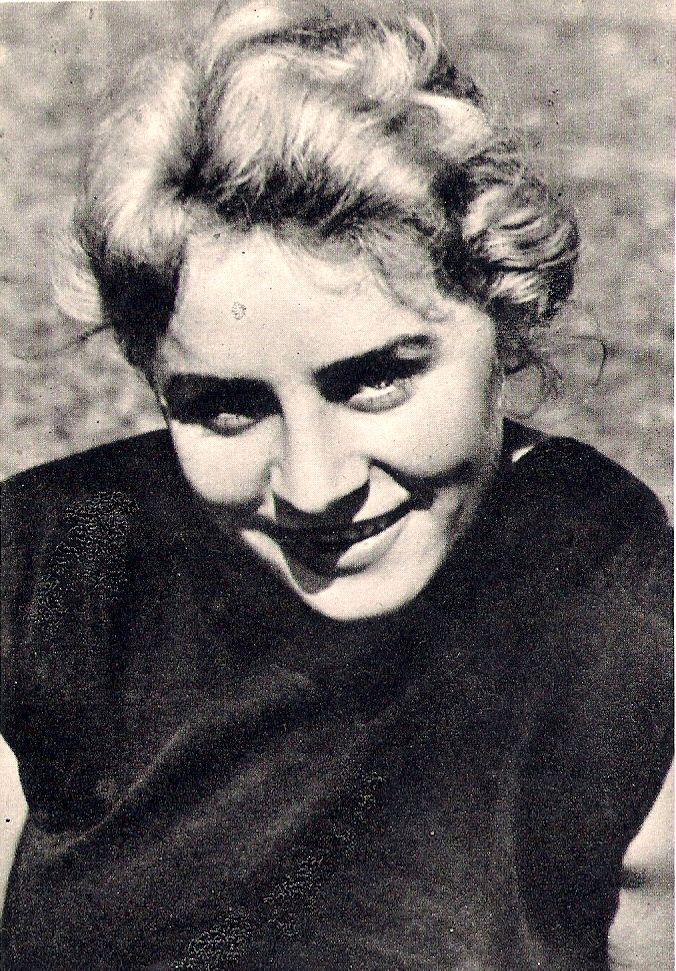

Personal information
- Nationality: Polish
- Born: Barbara Lerczak; 6 December 1936 Poznań, Poland
- Died: 20 November 2000 (aged 63) Kraków, Poland
- Life partner: Jan Nowicki (1970–1974/1975)

Sport
- Sport: Sprinting
- Events: 100 metres 200 metres
- College team: AZS Poznań
- Club: AZS Poznań
Medal record
Women's athletics
Representing Poland
Olympic Games
Bronze medal – third place	1960 Rome	4×100 m
European Championships
Gold medal – first place	1958 Stockholm	200 m
Gold medal – first place	1962 Belgrade	4×100 m
Bronze medal – third place	1958 Stockholm	4×100 m
Bronze medal – third place	1962 Belgrade	200 m
Universiade
Gold medal – first place	1961 Sofia	200 m

Barbara Sobotta-Janiszewska, née Barbara Lerczak, (December 4, 1936 – November 20, 2000) was a Polish athlete who mainly competed in the women's sprint events during her career.

In 1958 in Stockholm, she won the European Championships 200 metres race (as Maria Leontyavna Itkina won the bronze medal).

She competed for Poland at the 1960 Summer Olympics held in Rome, Italy where she won the bronze medal in the women's 4 × 100 metres with her teammates Teresa Wieczorek, Celina Jesionowska and Halina Richter.

== Personal life ==
Her first husband was Piotr Sobotta, a high jumper. She was later in informal relationship with Jan Nowicki, with whom she later had a son, Łukasz Nowicki, an actor and television presenter. After 4–5 years, Jan Nowicki broke up with Barbara for Irena Paszyn. Later she married the pole vaulter Zbigniew Janiszewski.

== International competitions ==
Year	Competition	Venue	Position	Event	Notes
Representing Poland
1954	World Student Games	Budapest, Hungary	3rd	4 × 100 m relay	47.4
1954	European Championships	Bern, Switzerland	9th (sf)	100 m	12.2
1954	European Championships	Bern, Switzerland	4th	200 m	24.4
1954	European Championships	Bern, Switzerland	5th	4 × 100 m relay	47.1
1955	World Festival of Youth and Students	Warsaw, Poland	3rd	4 × 100 m relay	47.4
1956	Olympic Games	Melbourne, Australia	21st (h)	100 m	12.37
1956	Olympic Games	Melbourne, Australia	11th (sf)	200 m	25.12
1956	Olympic Games	Melbourne, Australia	8th (h)	4 × 100 m relay	46.58
1958	European Championships	Stockholm, Sweden	11th (sf)	100 m	12.1
1958	European Championships	Stockholm, Sweden	1st	200 m	24.1
1958	European Championships	Stockholm, Sweden	3rd	4 × 100 m relay	46.0
1959	Universiade	Turin, Italy	4th	100 m	12.2
1959	Universiade	Turin, Italy	2nd	200 m	24.2
1959	Universiade	Turin, Italy	6th	4 × 100 m relay	49.2
1960	Olympic Games	Rome, Italy	5th	200 m	24.96
1960	Olympic Games	Rome, Italy	3rd	4 × 100 m relay	45.19
1961	Universiade	Sofia, Bulgaria	1st	200 m	24.44
1961	Universiade	Sofia, Bulgaria	2nd	4 × 100 m relay	47.6
1962	European Championships	Belgrade, Yugoslavia	3rd	200 m	23.9
1962	European Championships	Belgrade, Yugoslavia	1st	4 × 100 m relay	44.5
1964	Olympic Games	Tokyo, Japan	19th (qf)	100 m	11.8
1964	Olympic Games	Tokyo, Japan	6th	200 m	23.97

== Additional images ==
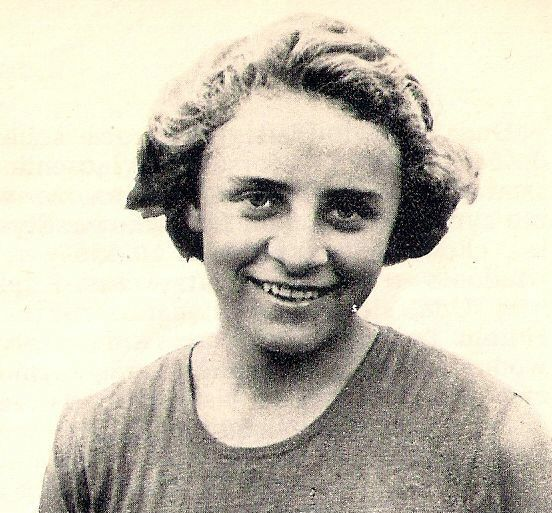

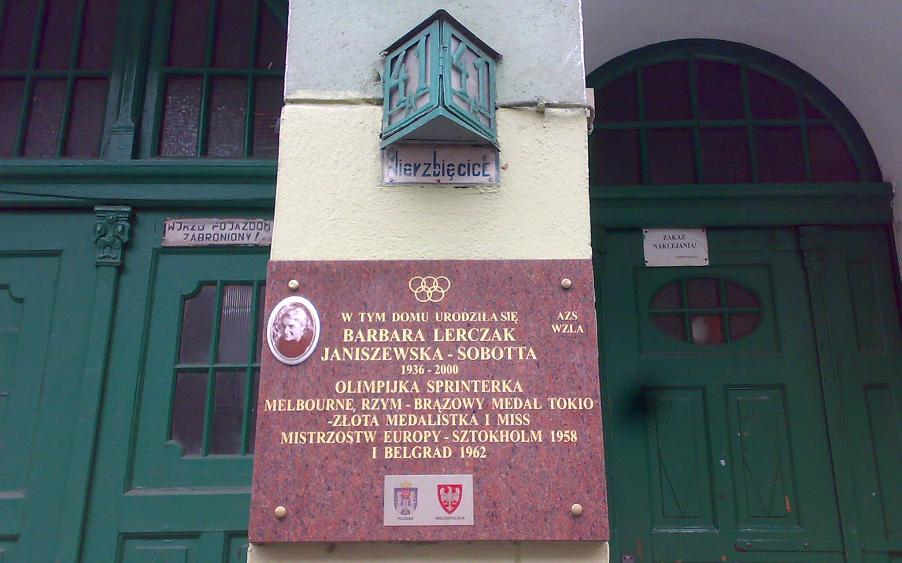
Commemorative plaque outside Barbara Sobotta's family home at 41a Wierzbięcice Street in Poznań
