= Celina Jesionowska =

Polish sprinter (1933–2026)

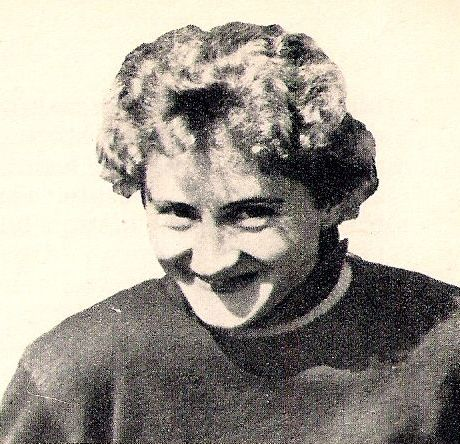

Personal information
- National team: Poland
- Born: 3 November 1933 Łomża, Poland
- Died: 19 July 2026 (aged 92) Stara Wrona, Poland
- Education: Financial Technical College, accounting, athletics
- Occupations: Accountant and athlete
- Years active: 1953–1966
- Height: 164 cm (5 ft 5 in)
- Weight: 55 kg (121 lb)

Sport
- Country: Poland
- Sport: Athletics
- Events: 100m, 200m, 400 m, 4 × 100 m relay, long jump
- Club: CWKS "Legia" Warsaw

Achievements and titles
- Olympic finals: 1960, Bronze Medal, 4 × 100 m relay
Medal record
Women's athletics
Representing Poland
Olympic Games
Bronze medal – third place	1960 Rome	4 × 100 m
European Championships
Bronze medal – third place	1958 Stockholm	4 × 100 m
- Updated on 8 July 2017

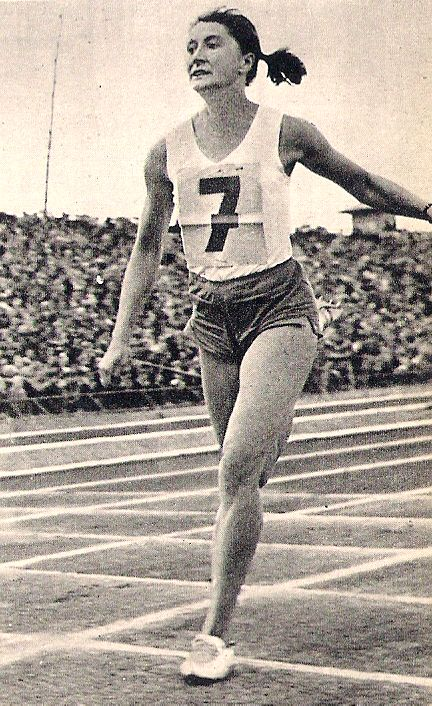
Celina Jesionowska

Celina Jesionowska (later names Gerwin and Orzechowska, 3 November 1933 – 19 July 2026) was a Polish athlete who competed mainly in the 100 and 200 metres and, during the last part of her career, in the 400 metres. She competed for Poland in the 1960 Summer Olympics held in Rome, Italy, in the 4 × 100 metres where she won the bronze medal with her teammates Teresa Wieczorek, Barbara Janiszewska and Halina Richter.

Jesionowska also competed in three European Championships:

- 1954 in Bern, where she was eliminated in the 100 metres semi-finals, and took fifth place in the 4 × 100 metres relay with her teammates Marią Ilwicką, Barbarą Lerczak and Marią Kusion.
- 1958 in Stockholm, where she won the bronze medal in the 4 × 100 metres relay with the same team, and reached the semi-finals in the 200 and 100 metres.
- 1966 in Budapest, where she was eliminated in the first round qualifiers for the 100 metres.

Throughout her career, Jesionowska was a competitor with the Central Military Sports Club "Legia" Warsaw (CWKS "Legia" Warsaw), through which she attained seven Polish championships:

- 400 metres – 1964, 1965 and 1966.
- 4 × 100 metres relay – 1957, 1958, 1959 and 1960.

Jesionowska died on 19 July 2026, at the age of 92.

== Cultural influence ==
In 1976, Jesionowska appeared in an episode of the television series The Way It Was which showcased the 1960 Summer Olympics, in which she gained her bronze medal.

== International competitions ==
Year	Competition	Venue	Position	Event	Notes
Representing Poland
1954	World Student Games	Budapest, Hungary	3rd	4 × 100 m relay	47.4
1954	European Championships	Bern, Switzerland	10th (sf)	100 m	12.4
1954	European Championships	Bern, Switzerland	5th	4 × 100 m relay	47.1
1955	World Festival of Youth and Students	Warsaw, Poland	3rd	4 × 100 m relay	47.4
1958	European Championships	Stockholm, Sweden	13th (sf)	100 m	12.2
1958	European Championships	Stockholm, Sweden	8th (sf)	200 m	24.8
1958	European Championships	Stockholm, Sweden	3rd	4 × 100 m relay	46.0
1960	Olympic Games	Rome, Italy	13th (sf)	200 m	25.45
1960	Olympic Games	Rome, Italy	3rd	4 × 100 m relay	45.19
1965	European Cup Final	Kassel, West Germany	5th	400 m	56.1
1966	European Championships	Budapest, Hungary	25th (h)	400 m	55.9

== Personal bests ==
Jesionowska's published personal bests include:

- 100 metres – 11.8 seconds (Bydgoszcz 1958)
- 200 metres – 23.8 seconds (Olsztyn 1960)
- 400 metres – 55.4 seconds (Wrocław 1966)
- 80 meters hurdles – 11.0 seconds (Kraków 1965)
- Long jump – 5.85 metres (Łódź 1959)
