= Jean Hiscock =

British sprinter

Personal information
- Nationality: British (English)
- Born: 9 April 1939 (age 86) Bristol, England
- Height: 175 cm (5 ft 9 in)
- Weight: 64 kg (141 lb)

Sport
- Sport: Athletics
- Event: Sprinting
- Club: Bristol & West AC

Hilary Jean Hiscock (born 9 April 1939) is a British retired sprinter who competed at the 1960 Summer Olympics.

== Biography ==
Hiscock finished third behind Dorothy Hyman in the 220 yards event at the 1960 WAAA Championships.

At the 1960 Olympic Games in Rome, she represented Great Britain in the women's 200 metres competition.
