= 1960 WAAA Championships =

British athletics event

- Dates: 1–2 July
- Host city: London
- Venue: White City Stadium
- Level: Senior
- Type: Outdoor

The 1960 WAAA Championships were the national track and field championships for women in the United Kingdom.

The event was held at White City Stadium, London, from 1 to 2 July 1960.

== Results ==
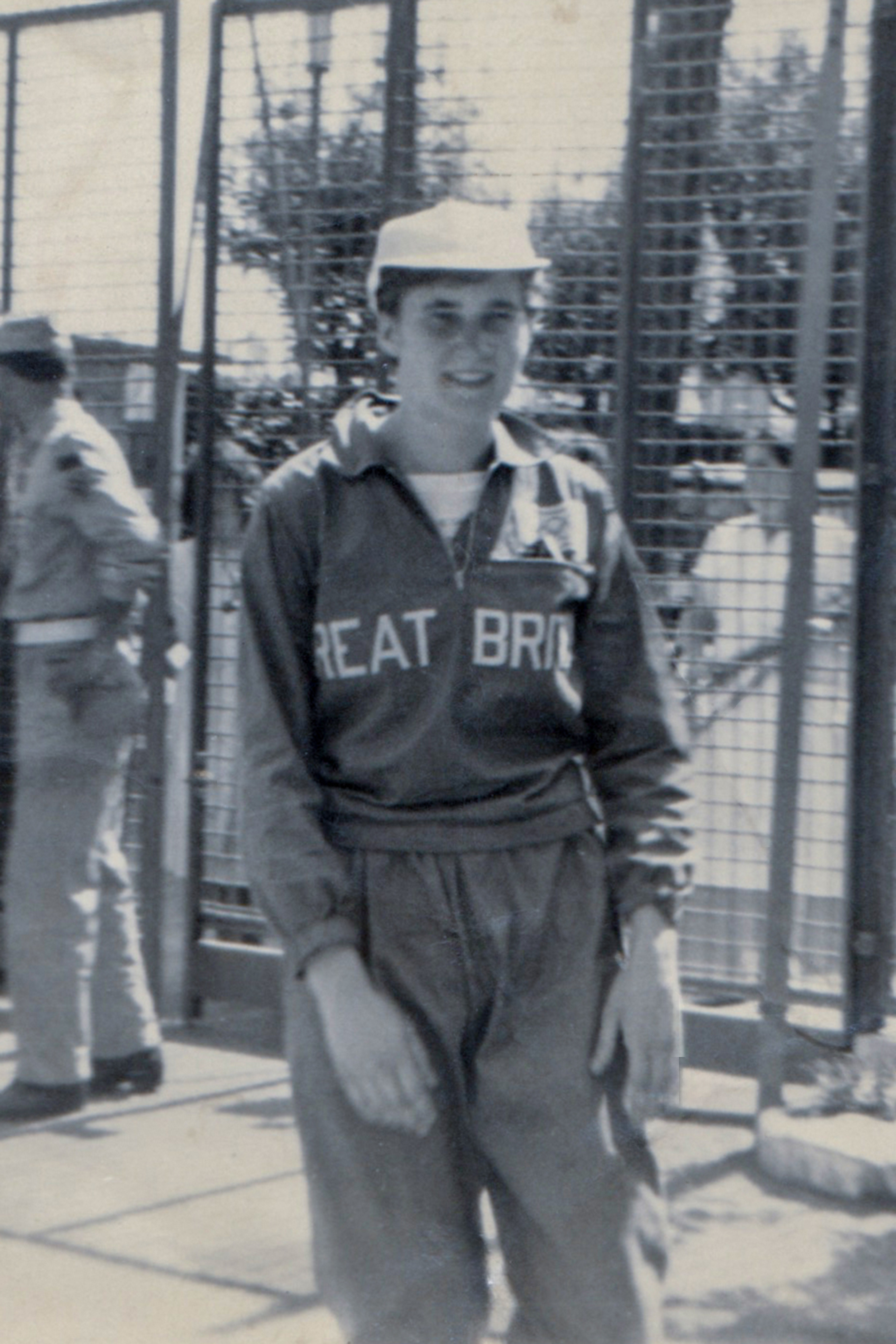
Dorothy Shirley won the high jump

Event	Gold		Silver		Bronze	
100 yards	Dorothy Hyman	11.7	(Scotland) Jennifer Smart	11.7	Elizabeth Wheeler	12.0
220 yards	Dorothy Hyman	24.0	(Scotland) Jennifer Smart	24.0	Jean Hiscock	24.7
440 yards	Pam Piercy	57.2	Lesley Davis	57.5	Jean Dunbar	58.0
880 yards	Joy Jordan	2:09.1	Phyllis Perkins	2:09.6	Diane Charles	2:10.6
1 mile	Roma Ashby	4:54.2	Diane Charles	4:58.2	Joan Briggs	5:04.2
80 metres hurdles	Carole Quinton	10.8w	(Australia) Betty R. Moore	11.0w	Pat Nutting	11.2w
High jump	Dorothy Shirley	1.676	Janet Gaunt	1.676	Iris Pegley	1.651
Long jump	Ann Packer	5.68	Marion Needham	5.67	Barbara Brooks	5.61
Shot put	Suzanne Allday	14.30	Iris Mouzer	13.10	Ann Duckham	12.38
Discus throw	Suzanne Allday	45.25	Betty Smith	40.80	Sylvia Needham	40.66
Javelin	Sue Platt	50.83	Averil Williams	45.17	Monica Podmore	43.58
Pentathlon +	Mary Bignal	4568	Janet Gaunt	4261	Pat Nutting	4051
1½ mile walk	Judy Woodsford	12:31.2	Joan Wallis	12:32.0	Sheila Jennings	12:38.6

+ Held on 4 June at Birmingham University

== See also ==
- 1960 AAA Championships
