= Jutta Heine =

German sprinter (born 1940)

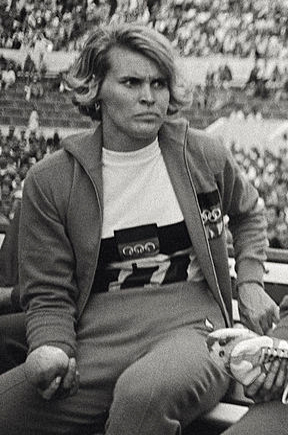
- Heine at the 1960 Olympics

Personal information
- Nationality: German
- Born: 16 September 1940 (age 85) Stadthagen, Germany
- Height: 182 cm (6 ft 0 in)
- Weight: 71 kg (157 lb)

Sport
- Sport: Athletics
- Events: Sprint, pentathlon
- Club: DHC Hannover; ASV Köln

Achievements and titles
- Personal bests: 100 m – 11.4 (1962); 200 m – 23.3 (1962); 80 mH – 10.7 (1962)
Medal record
Women's athletics
Representing Germany
Olympic Games
Silver medal – second place	1960 Rome	200 m
Silver medal – second place	1960 Rome	4×100 m
Representing West Germany
European Championships
Gold medal – first place	1962 Belgrade	200 m
Silver medal – second place	1962 Belgrade	100 m
Silver medal – second place	1962 Belgrade	4×100 m
Summer Universiade
Gold medal – first place	1963 Porto Alegre	200m
Gold medal – first place	1963 Porto Alegre	80m hurdles
Silver medal – second place	1963 Porto Alegre	4x100m relay

Judith Heine (German pronunciation: [ˈjʊta ˈhaɪnə]; born 16 September 1940) is a retired West German sprinter who competed at two Olympic Games.

== Biography ==
Heine competed in the 200 metres and 4 × 100 metres relay events at the 1960 and 1964 Olympics and won two silver medals in 1960. In 1964 she finished fifth in the relay and was disqualified in the 200 m heats for false starts. In 1962 Heine won one gold and two silver medals at the European Championships and was selected as West German Sportswoman of the Year.

Domestically she held West German national titles in 200 m (1959 and 1961–63), 100 m (1962) and pentathlon (1960 and 1962). Heine also finished second behind Dorothy Hyman in the 220 yards event at the British 1962 WAAA Championships.

Besides athletics, Heine was an amateur harness race driver and has a degree in finances.

Awards
Preceded by Heidi Schmid	German Sportswoman of the Year; 1962	Succeeded by Ursel Brunner
