= Carole Quinton =

British athletics competitor

Personal information
- Nationality: British (English)
- Born: Rugby, Warwickshire, England
- Height: 5 ft 8 in (173 cm)
- Weight: 132 lb (60 kg)

Sport
- Sport: Athletics
- Event(s): Hurdling, sprinting, pentathlon
- Club: Birchfield Harriers

Achievements and titles
- Olympic finals: 1956, 1960
- Regional finals: 1958
- Commonwealth finals: 1958
Medal record
Women's athletics
Representing Great Britain
Olympic Games
Silver medal – second place	1960 Rome	80 m hurdles
European Championships
Silver medal – second place	1958 Stockholm	4x100 m relay
Representing England
British Empire and Commonwealth Games
Silver medal – second place	1958 Cardiff	80 m hurdles

Carole Louise Quinton (born 11 July 1936) is an English former track and field athlete, who won silver medals at the 1958 British Empire and Commonwealth Games, 1958 European Athletics Championships and 1960 Summer Olympics.

== Early life ==
Quinton was born in Rugby, Warwickshire and attended St Paul's RC School in Coleshill. She moved to Anchorage Road in Sutton Coldfield in 1951. Her father Fred was an inspector in the Police.

== Athletics career ==
Quinton competed in the sprint and 80 metres hurdles events.

Quinton finished second behind Margaret Rowley in the pentathlon event at the 1955 WAAA Championships.

Quinton competed for Great Britain at the 1956 Summer Olympics. Despite not being in the initial British squad, she was selected to replace Pamela Elliott, who withdrew as she was pregnant.

Quinton finished second behind Thelma Hopkins in the 80 metres hurdles event at the 1957 WAAA Championships before becoming the national 80 metres hurdles champion after winning the British WAAA Championships title at the 1958 WAAA Championships.

She represented England and won a silver medal in the 80 metres hurdles at the 1958 British Empire and Commonwealth Games in Cardiff, Wales. In the final, Quinton and winner Norma Thrower finished in a wind assisted 10.7 seconds in the final, faster than the previous Games record, though due to the wind assistance, it was not classified as a Games record time. At the time of her British Commonwealth and Empire Games medal, Quinton was the reigning British national champion in the 80 metres event. In the same year, she was in the British team that came second in the 4 × 100 metres relay event at the 1958 European Athletics Championships.

In 1959, she competed in a Great Britain vs West Germany athletics meeting in White City, London. She came second in the 80 metres hurdles event. Quinton regained her WAAA 80 metres title at the 1960 WAAA Championships.

In 1960, she set the British national record time for the 80 metres hurdles twice. She ran a record time of 11.0 seconds in July 1960, and later in the month, she ran a new record time of 10.9 seconds. At the 1960 Summer Olympics in Rome, Italy, Quinton won the silver medal in the 80 m hurdles. She also competed in the 4 × 100 metres relay alongside Dorothy Hyman, Jenny Smart and Mary Rand. They did not finish in the final of the event.

== Personal life ==
She worked as a shorthand typist. In 1961, she married water polo player David Barr in Hove.
