= Athletics at the 1965 Summer Universiade – Women's 80 metres hurdles =

The women's 80 metres hurdles event at the 1965 Summer Universiade was held at the People's Stadium in Budapest on 26 August 1965.

== Medalists ==
Gold	Silver	Bronze
Danuta Straszyńska; Poland	Snezhana Kerkova; Bulgaria	Tatyana Ilyina; Soviet Union

== Results ==
=== Heats ===
Wind:
Heat 1: +4.3 m/s, Heat 2: +4.6 m/s

Rank	Heat	Athlete	Nationality	Time	Notes
?	1	Irina Press	Soviet Union	11.0	Q
?	1	Alena Schusterová	Czechoslovakia	11.3	Q
?	1	Ritsuko Sukegawa	Japan	11.4	Q
?	1	Snezhana Kerkova	Bulgaria	?.??	Q
5	1	Susan Hayward	Great Britain	11.4	
6	1	Małgorzata Stepczyńska	Poland	11.5	
7	1	Margarete Weiher	West Germany	11.6	
1	2	Tatyana Ilyina	Soviet Union	10.8	Q
2	2	Danuta Straszyńska	Poland	10.8	Q
3	2	Eva Kucmanová	Czechoslovakia	11.4	Q
4	2	Anne Fordyce	Great Britain	11.5	Q
5	2	Elisabeth Ermatinger	Switzerland	11.6	
6	2	Ildikó Jónas	Hungary	11.8	
7	2	Angelika Müller	West Germany	12.1	

=== Final ===
Rank	Name	Nationality	Time	Notes
1st place, gold medalist(s)	Danuta Straszyńska	Poland	10.6	
2nd place, silver medalist(s)	Snezhana Kerkova	Bulgaria	10.8	
3rd place, bronze medalist(s)	Tatyana Ilyina	Soviet Union	10.9	
4	Alena Schusterová	Czechoslovakia	11.1	
5	Ritsuko Sukegawa	Japan	11.3	
6	Eva Kucmanová	Czechoslovakia	11.5	
	Anne Fordyce	Great Britain	DNF	
	Irina Press	Soviet Union	DNS	
