= Marianne Dew =

Former English athlete

Personal information
- Nationality: British (English)
- Born: 8 September 1938
- Died: 16 September 2013 (aged 75)

Sport
- Sport: Athletics
- Event: Sprinting
- Club: Selsonia Ladies AC
Medal record
Women's athletics
Representing Great Britain
European Championships
Silver medal – second place	1958 Stockholm	4×100 m

Marianne Claire Dew married name Black (8 September 1938 – 16 September 2013), was an athlete who competed for England.

== Biography ==
Dew won the 1958 Surrey and 1958 Southern 220 yards titles, and then finished third behind Heather Young in the 220 yards event at the 1958 WAAA Championships.

Shortly afterwards she represented England in the 220 yards at the 1958 British Empire and Commonwealth Games in Cardiff, Wales.

She won a silver medal at the 1958 European Athletics Championships.

Dew finished second behind Dorothy Hyman in the 220 yards event at the 1959 WAAA Championships.

She married Alan Black of the Belgrave Harriers in early 1974.
