= 1962 European Athletics Championships – Women's 100 metres =

Women's 100 metres at the 1962 European Athletics Championships
- Venue: JNA Stadium
- Location: Belgrade
- Dates: 12 September (heats); 13 September (semifinals & final)
- Competitors: 19 from 11 nations
- Winning time: 11.3

Medalists
gold medal	Dorothy Hyman	Great Britain
silver medal	Jutta Heine	West Germany
bronze medal	Teresa Ciepły	Poland

The women's 100 metres at the 1962 European Athletics Championships was held in Belgrade, then Yugoslavia, at JNA Stadium on 12 and 13 September 1962.

== Participation ==
According to an unofficial count, 19 athletes from 11 countries participated in the event.

- Belgium (1)
- Bulgaria (1)
- East Germany (1)
- France (1)
- Hungary (3)
- Italy (1)
- Poland (3)
- Soviet Union (2)
- Great Britain (3)
- West Germany (2)
- Yugoslavia (1)

== Results ==
=== Heats ===
12 September

==== Heat 1 ====
Rank	Name	Nationality	Time	Notes
1	Hannelore Raepke	East Germany	11.9	Q
2	Galina Popova	Soviet Union	11.9	Q
3	Erzsébet Heldt	Hungary	12.0	Q
4	Zdenka Leskovac	Yugoslavia	12.1	
5	Michèle Davaze	France	12.2	
			Wind: -0.2 m/s	

==== Heat 2 ====
Rank	Name	Nationality	Time	Notes
1	Jutta Heine	West Germany	11.5	CR, Q
2	Halina Górecka	Poland	11.7	Q
3	Margit Markó	Hungary	11.8	Q
4	Madeleine Cobb	Great Britain	12.0	
5	Therese Schueremans	Belgium	13.0	
			Wind: -0.3 m/s	

==== Heat 3 ====
Rank	Name	Nationality	Time	Notes
1	Dorothy Hyman	Great Britain	11.6	Q
2	Teresa Ciepły	Poland	11.8	Q
3	Lyudmila Motina	Soviet Union	11.9	Q
4	Daniela Spampani	Italy	12.1	
5	Veselina Kolarova	Bulgaria	12.2	
			Wind: -0.5 m/s	

==== Heat 4 ====
Rank	Name	Nationality	Time	Notes
1	Elżbieta Szyroka	Poland	12.0	Q
2	Martha Pensberger	West Germany	12.0	Q
3	Daphne Arden	Great Britain	12.1	Q
4	Teréz Bata	Hungary	12.2	
			Wind: -0.9 m/s	

=== Semi-finals ===
13 September

==== Semi-final 1 ====
Rank	Name	Nationality	Time	Notes
1	Jutta Heine	West Germany	11.4	CR, Q
2	Teresa Ciepły	Poland	11.6	Q
3	Daphne Arden	Great Britain	11.7	Q
4	Galina Popova	Soviet Union	11.8	
5	Erzsébet Heldt	Hungary	12.0	
6	Margit Markó	Hungary	12.6	
			Wind: +0.8 m/s	

==== Semi-final 2 ====
Rank	Name	Nationality	Time	Notes
1	Dorothy Hyman	Great Britain	11.6	Q
2	Elżbieta Szyroka	Poland	11.7	Q
3	Hannelore Raepke	East Germany	11.7	Q
4	Martha Pensberger	West Germany	11.8	
5	Lyudmila Motina	Soviet Union	11.9	
6	Halina Górecka	Poland	12.0	
			Wind: +0.6 m/s	

=== Final ===
13 September

Rank	Name	Nationality	Time	Notes
1st place, gold medalist(s)	Dorothy Hyman	Great Britain	11.3	
2nd place, silver medalist(s)	Jutta Heine	West Germany	11.3	
3rd place, bronze medalist(s)	Teresa Ciepły	Poland	11.4	
4	Daphne Arden	Great Britain	11.5	
5	Hannelore Raepke	East Germany	11.6	
6	Elżbieta Szyroka	Poland	11.8	
			Wind: +2.3 m/s	
