= Meredith Ellis =

American sprinter

Personal information
- Nationality: American
- Born: September 9, 1941 (age 84) New York, New York, United States

Sport
- Sport: Sprinting
- Event: 200 metres

Meredith Ellis (born September 9, 1941) is an American sprinter. She competed in the women's 200 metres at the 1956 Summer Olympics.
