= Hannelore Raepke =

German sprinter

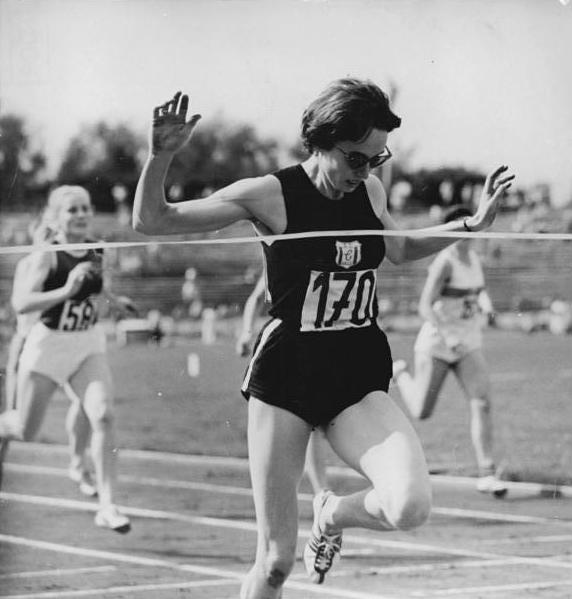
- Raepke at th East German Championships in 1961

Personal information
- Born: 25 October 1935 (age 90) Berlin, Germany
- Height: 1.65 m (5 ft 5 in)

Sport
- Event(s): 100 metres, 200 metres
- Club: SC Chemie Halle
Medal record
Women's athletics
Representing East Germany
European Championships
Silver medal – second place	1958 Stockholm	200 m

Hannelore Raepke, née Hannelore Sadau, (25 October 1935) is a German sprinter.

She grew up in Eisleben, where her mother was a master tailor. Hannelore Sadau tried gymnastics, handball and basketball as a child, but eventually set a school record in the 100 metres. Still, she did not break through internationally until after she finished her higher education.

She most notably won a silver medal in the 200 metres at the 1958 European Championships. Here, she also placed sixth in the 4 × 100 metres relay. In the same year, she set a world record in the rarely-contested 4 × 200 metres relay.

She competed in the 100 and 200 metres at the 1960 Summer Olympics without reaching the final. Her failure in the 100 metres reportedly came after a very slow start.

At the 1962 European Championships, she finished fifth in the 100 metres and competed in the 200 metres without reaching the final.

She became double 100 and 200 metres champion in East Germany in 1961, 1962 and 1963 whereas in 1964 she only won the 200 metres. She became East German indoor champion in the 400 metres in 1964. She represented the club SC Chemie Halle.
