= 1958 WAAA Championships =

British athletics event

- Dates: 7 June
- Host city: London
- Venue: Motspur Park
- Level: Senior
- Type: Outdoor

The 1958 WAAA Championships were the national track and field championships for women in the United Kingdom.

The event was held at Motspur Park, London, on 7 June 1958.

== Results ==
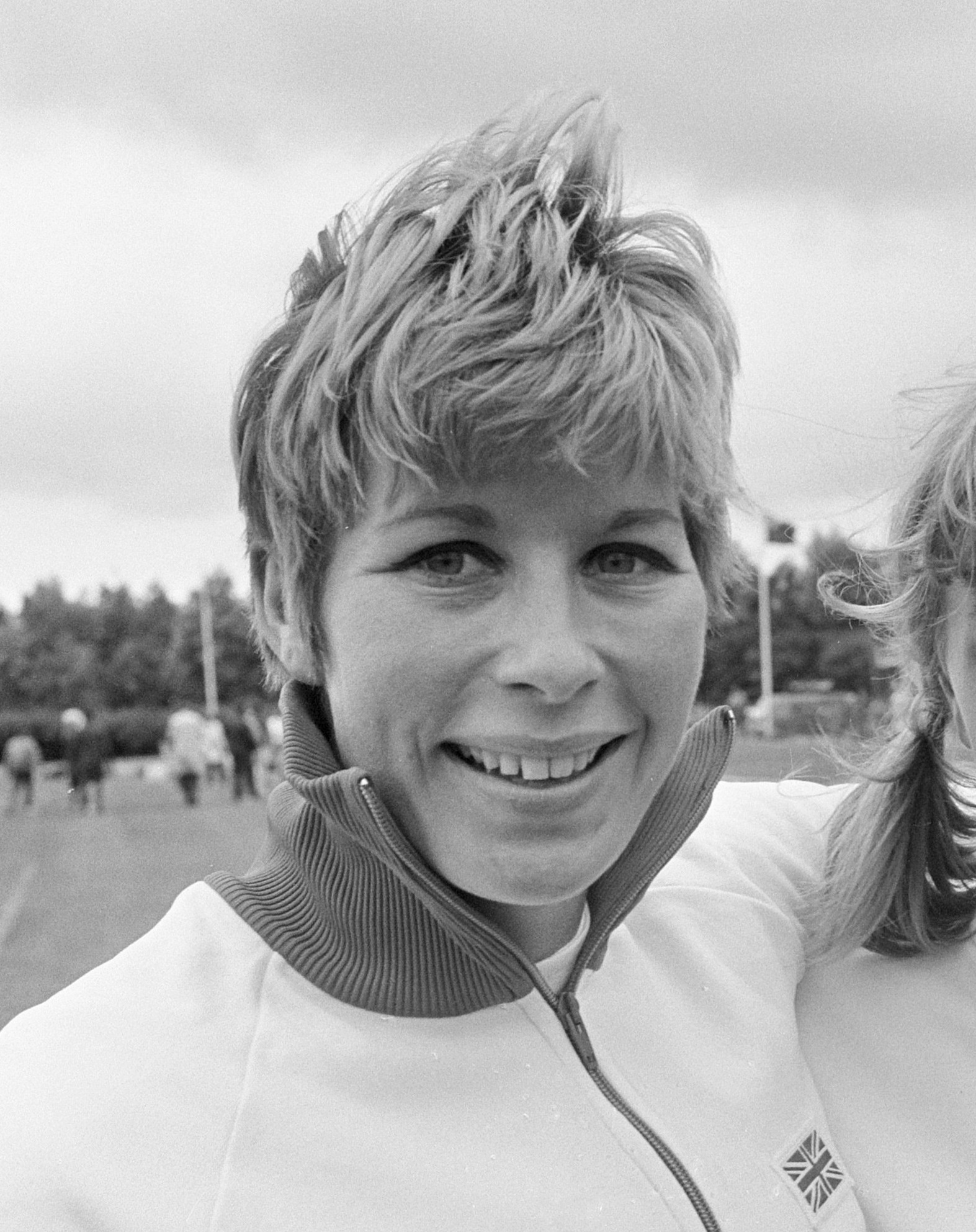
Mary Bignal won the first of her 12 national titles

Event	Gold		Silver		Bronze	
100 yards	Madeleine Weston	10.6w	Heather Young	10.7w	June Paul	10.7w
220 yards	Heather Young	24.5	June Paul	24.6	Marianne Dew	24.7
440 yards	Shirley Pirie	56.4 =WR	(Scotland) Lesley Mackinnnon	57.5	Pam Piercy	57.6
880 yards	Joy Jordan	2:13.3	Diane Leather	2:13.4	Maureen Smith	2:14.9
1 mile	Maureen Smith	5:02.6	Roma Ashby	5:02.7	Madeleine Ibbotson	5:02.8
80 metres hurdles	Carole Quinton	10.9w	Pat Nutting	11.6w	Kathleen Degg	11.6w
High jump	Mary Bignal	1.651	Audrey Bennett	1.626	Thelma Hopkins	1.600
Long jump	Sheila Hoskin	5.96	Mary Bignal	5.88	Jean Whitehead	5.79
Shot put	Suzanne Allday	13.80	Josephine Cook	13.60	Iris Mouzer	12.10
Discus throw	Suzanne Allday	47.70 NR	Maya Giri	42.20	Sylvia Needham	42.18
Javelin	Averil Williams	43.49	Mary Tadd	42.72	Sue Platt	41.33
Pentathlon +	Janet Gaunt	3887	Jean Adamson	3661	(Republic of Ireland) Maeve Kyle	3655
1 mile walk	Betty Franklin	8:09.4	Helen Vincent	8:17.4	Beryl Randle	8:22.8

+ Held on 13 September at Stoke-on-Trent

== See also ==
- 1958 AAA Championships
