= Iris Mouzer =

English shot putter

Personal information
- Nationality: British (English)
- Born: 24 July 1937 (age 88)

Sport
- Sport: Athletics
- Event: Shot put
- Club: Birchfield Harriers

Iris Jane Mouzer (born 1937), is a female former athlete who competed for England.

== Biography ==
Mouzer finished third behind Suzanne Allday in the shot put event at the 1958 WAAA Championships and improved to second behind Allday at the 1960 WAAA Championships and 1961 WAAA Championships.

Shortly afterwards she represented England in the shot put at the 1958 British Empire and Commonwealth Games in Cardiff, Wales. She was a post office worker at the time of the Games.
