= Athletics at the 1961 Summer Universiade – Women's 200 metres =

The women's 200 metres event at the 1961 Summer Universiade was held at the Vasil Levski National Stadium in Sofia, Bulgaria, in September 1961.

== Medalists ==
Gold	Silver	Bronze
Barbara Janiszewska; Poland	Joan Atkinson; Great Britain	Vera Kabranyuk; Soviet Union

== Results ==
=== Heats ===
Rank	Heat	Name	Nationality	Time	Notes
1	1	Joan Atkinson	Great Britain	24.62	Q
2	1	Mirosława Sałacińska	Poland	25.1	Q
3	1	Hisako Tamura	Japan	26.1	
1	2	Barbara Janiszewska	Poland	24.5	Q
2	2	Vera Kabranyuk	Soviet Union	24.8	Q
3	2	Stefka Ilieva	Bulgaria	25.7	
1	3	Snezhana Kerkova	Bulgaria	25.2	Q
3	3	Yuko Kobayashi	Japan	26.7	
4	3	Hatibi Hakhire	Albania	28.7	
	3	Monika Kropáčová	Czechoslovakia	DNF	

=== Final ===
Rank	Athlete	Nationality	Time	Notes
1st place, gold medalist(s)	Barbara Janiszewska	Poland	24.44	
2nd place, silver medalist(s)	Joan Atkinson	Great Britain	24.49	
3rd place, bronze medalist(s)	Vera Kabranyuk	Soviet Union	24.70	
4	Mirosława Sałacińska	Poland	25.14	
	Snezhana Kerkova	Bulgaria	DNS	
