= Teresa Ciepły =

Polish sprinter and hurdler

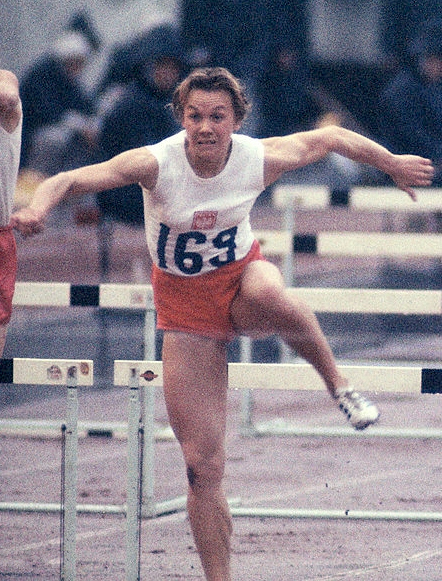
- Teresa Ciepły at the 1964 Olympics

Personal information
- Born: 19 October 1937 Brodnia, Poland
- Died: 8 March 2006 (aged 68) Bydgoszcz, Poland
- Height: 1.66 m (5 ft 5 in)
- Weight: 60 kg (132 lb)

Sport
- Sport: Athletics
- Events: 100 m, 200 m, hurdles, high jump, long jump, pentathlon
- Club: ŁKS Łódź; Zawisza Bydgoszcz

Achievements and titles
- Personal bests: 100 m – 11.5 (1962); 200 m – 24.7 (1960); 80 mH – 10.77 (1964); HJ – 1.50 m (1960); LJ – 6.22 m (1962); Pentathlon – 4420 (1960)
Medal record
Women's athletics
Representing Poland
Olympic Games
Gold medal – first place	1964 Tokyo	4×100 m
Silver medal – second place	1964 Tokyo	80 m Hurdles
Bronze medal – third place	1960 Rome	4×100 m
European Championships
Gold medal – first place	1962 Belgrade	80 m hurdles
Gold medal – first place	1962 Belgrade	4×100 m
Bronze medal – third place	1962 Belgrade	100 m

Teresa Barbara Ciepły, née Wieczorek (19 October 1937 – 8 March 2006) was a Polish sprinter and hurdler who competed at the 1960 Summer Olympics.

== Biography ==
At the 1960 Olympic Games in Rome, she represented Poland and won a bronze medal in the 4 × 100 metre relay. Shortly after the 1960 Olympics she married Olgierd Ciepły, an Olympic hammer thrower. Two years later she won gold medals in the 4 × 100 m relay (in European record time of 44.5 seconds) and the 80 m hurdles, and a bronze medal in the 100 m sprint at the 1962 European Championships. The same year she was chosen as the Polish Sportspersonality of the year. At the 1964 Olympics she won a gold medal in the 4 × 100 m relay, in a world record time of 43.6 seconds, and a silver in the 80 m hurdles. Nationally Ciepły won the Polish titles in the 80 m hurdles (1961–62, 1964–1965) and in the 100 m sprint (1960–1962).

Ciepły finished second behind Pat Jones in the 80 metres hurdles event at the British 1965 WAAA Championships.

In retirement Ciepły worked as a clerk and an athletics coach in Bydgoszcz. After her death, a secondary school there was named in her honor.

== International competitions ==
Year	Competition	Venue	Position	Event	Notes
Representing Poland
1958	European Championships	Stockholm, Sweden	13th	Long jump	5.63 m
1959	World Festival of Youth and Students	Vienna, Austria	2nd	Long jump	5.98 m
1960	Olympic Games	Rome, Italy	10th (sf)	100 m	12.05
1960	Olympic Games	Rome, Italy	9th (sf)	80 m hurdles	11.40
1960	Olympic Games	Rome, Italy	3rd	4 × 100 m relay	45.19
1961	Universiade	Sofia, Bulgaria	1st	200 m	24.44
1961	Universiade	Sofia, Bulgaria	2nd	4 × 100 m relay	47.6
1962	World Festival of Youth and Students	Helsinki, Finland	2nd	80 m hurdles	11.0
1962	European Championships	Belgrade, Yugoslavia	3rd	100 m	11.4 (w)
1962	European Championships	Belgrade, Yugoslavia	1st	80 m hurdles	10.6
1962	European Championships	Belgrade, Yugoslavia	1st	4 × 100 m relay	44.5
1964	Olympic Games	Tokyo, Japan	2nd	80 m hurdles	10.55
1964	Olympic Games	Tokyo, Japan	1st	4 × 100 m relay	43.6
1965	European Cup Final	Kassel, West Germany	1st	4 × 100 m relay	44.9
