= 1961 WAAA Championships =

British athletics event

- Dates: 8 July
- Host city: London
- Venue: White City Stadium
- Level: Senior
- Type: Outdoor

The 1961 WAAA Championships were the national track and field championships for women in the United Kingdom.

The event was held at White City Stadium, London, on 8 July 1961.

== Results ==
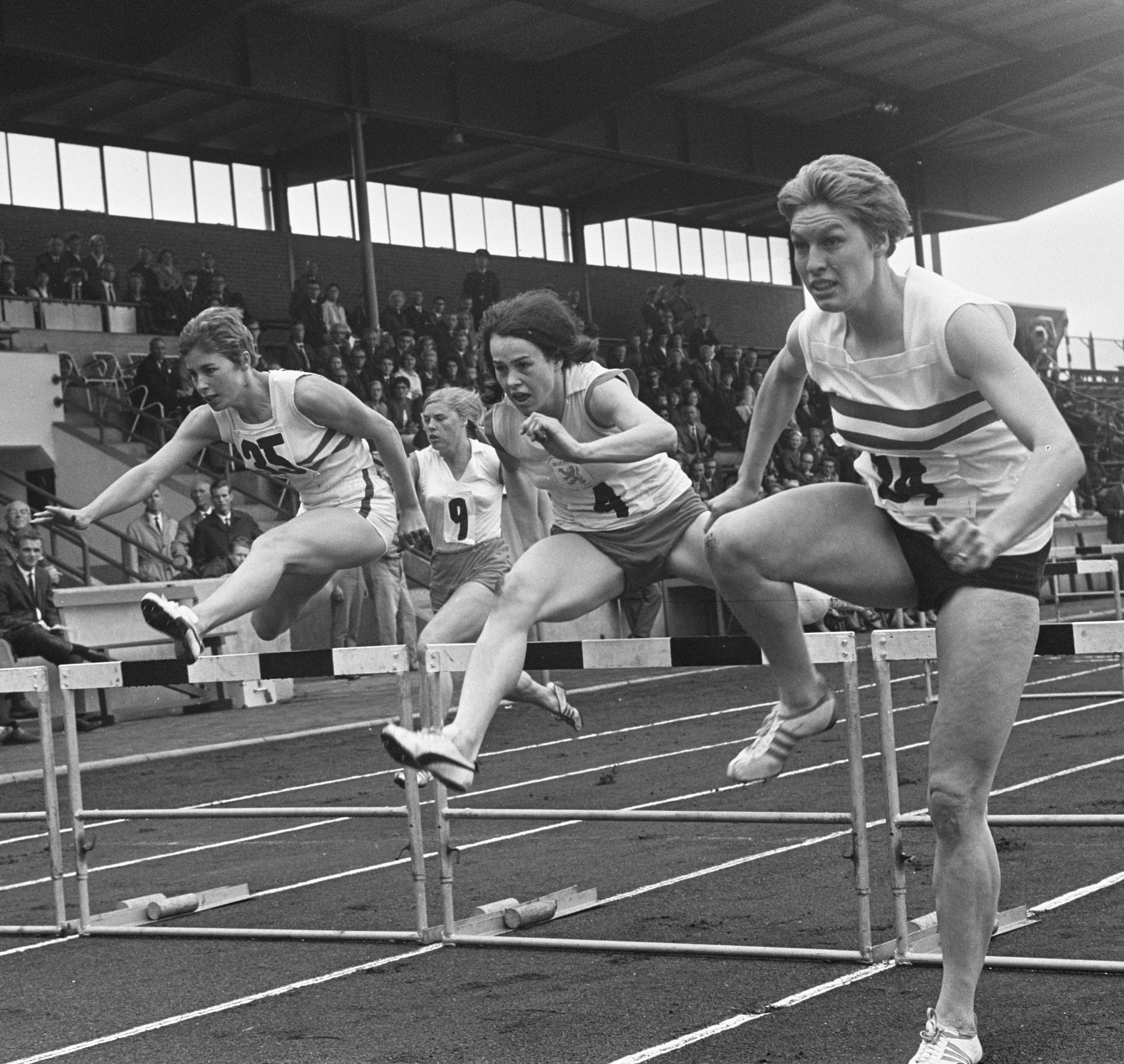
Pat Nutting (seen on the right) finally won her first WAAA title and broke the world record in the 200 metres hurdles

Event	Gold		Silver		Bronze	
100 yards	(Scotland) Jennifer Smart	10.7	Carole Carter	10.9	Daphne Arden	11.0
220 yards	(Scotland) Jennifer Smart	24.0	Jennifer Taylor	24.9	Daphne Arden	25.0
440 yards	(Republic of Ireland) Maeve Kyle	56.3	Jean Dunbar	56.9	Joy Grieveson	57.3
880 yards	Joy Jordan	2:11.0	Anne Oliver	2:13.0	Sallie Newell	2:13.8
1 mile	Roma Ashby	5:01.8	Elizabeth Joyce	5:05.7	Joan Briggs	5:06.8
80 metres hurdles	(Australia) Betty Moore	10.8w	Ann Charlesworth	10.9w	Pat Nutting	11.1w
200 metres hurdles	Pat Nutting	28.3 WR	Ann Charlesworth	28.6	Anne Fordyce	28.6
High jump	Dorothy Shirley	1.702	Thelma Hopkins	1.676	Patricia Veals	1.651
Long jump	Mary Rand	5.95	Christina Persighetti	5.83	Lorraine Winfield	5.81
Shot put	Suzanne Allday	13.73	Iris Mouzer	12.51	(Northern Ireland) Mary Peters	12.24
Discus throw	Suzanne Allday	45.30	Wendy Thomas	39.98	Brenda Bedford	39.42
Javelin	Sue Platt	47.88	Rosemary Morgan	43.25	Monica Podmore	41.90
Pentathlon +	Carole Hamby	3986	Brenda Gill	3972	Janet Gaunt	3923
1½ mile walk	Sheila Jennings	12:18.4	Judy Woodsford	12:29.6	Maureen Eyre	12:30.8

+ Held on 29 July at Birmingham University

== See also ==
- 1961 AAA Championships
