= Linda Ojastu =

Estonian athletics competitor (1936–2006)

Medal record

Women's athletics

Representing Soviet Union

European Championships
Gold medal – first place	1958 Stockholm	4×100 m

Linda Ojastu (until 1960, Linda Kepp; 29 February 1936 – 26 September 2006) was an Estonian athletics competitor.

She was born in Tartu. In 1958 she graduated from the University of Tartu's Institute of Physical Education.

She started her athletics exercising in 1950, coached by Vilma Jürisma. Since 1954 her coach was Fred Kudu. In 1958 she won gold medal at European Athletics Championships being a member of Soviet Union 4 × 100 m relay team.

She was multiple-times Estonian champion.

1957–1979 she worked as a coach at the sport club Tartu Kalev's athletics school.

She was married to track and field athlete Eino Ojastu. Their children are track and field athletes Annely Ojastu and Aivar Ojastu.

Records:

- 100 m: 11,8 (1958; repeating of Estonian record)
- long jump: 5.52 (1958)
