= Vera Krepkina =

Soviet athletics competitor (1933–2023)

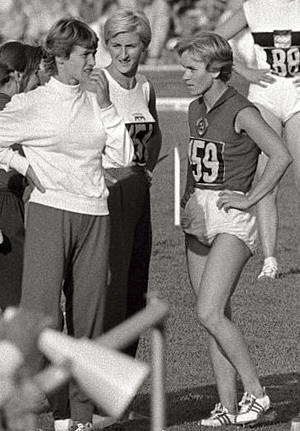
- Krepkina (right) at the 1960 Olympics

Personal information
- Born: 15 April 1933 Kotelnich, Russian SFSR, Soviet Union
- Died: 25 April 2023 (aged 90) Kyiv, Ukraine
- Height: 1.59 m (5 ft 3 in)
- Weight: 58 kg (128 lb)

Sport
- Country: Soviet Union
- Sport: Athletics
- Events: Sprints, long jump
- Club: Lokomotiv Vologda; Lokomotiv Kiev

Achievements and titles
- Personal bests: 100 m: 11.3 (1958); Long jump: 6.37 m (1960)
Medal record
Women's athletics
Representing Soviet Union
Olympic Games
Gold medal – first place	1960 Rome	Long jump
European Championships
Gold medal – first place	1954 Bern	4×100 m
Gold medal – first place	1958 Stockholm	4×100 m
Silver medal – second place	1958 Stockholm	100 m

Vera Samuilovna Krepkina, née Kalashnikova, (Russian: Вера Самуиловна Крепкина (Калашникова); 15 April 1933 – 25 April 2023) was a Soviet-Ukrainian track and field athlete. She competed for the Soviet Union at the 1952, 1956, and 1960 Olympics. At all these Olympics she finished fourth in the 4 × 100 m relay and was eliminated in the heats of the 100 m sprint. In 1960, she also took part in the long jump and won a surprise gold medal with an Olympic record of 6.37 m, ahead of the defending champion Elżbieta Krzesińska and the world record holder Hildrun Claus.

At the European Championships she won gold medals in the 4 × 100 m relay in 1954 and 1958 and finished second in the 100 m in 1958. She was a member of the Soviet team that set a world record in the 4 × 100 m relay in 1956, and she tied the world record (11.3 seconds) in the 100 meter dash in 1958. During her career Krepkina won eight Soviet titles: 100 m in 1952, 1957 and 1958; 200 m in 1952; 4 × 100 m relay in 1952, 1960 and 1965; and 4 × 200 m relay in 1952. In retirement she worked as a children's athletics coach in Ukraine.

Krepkina died on 25 April 2023, at the age of 90.
