= Pat Pryce =

English hurdler

Pat Pryce (née Nutting)
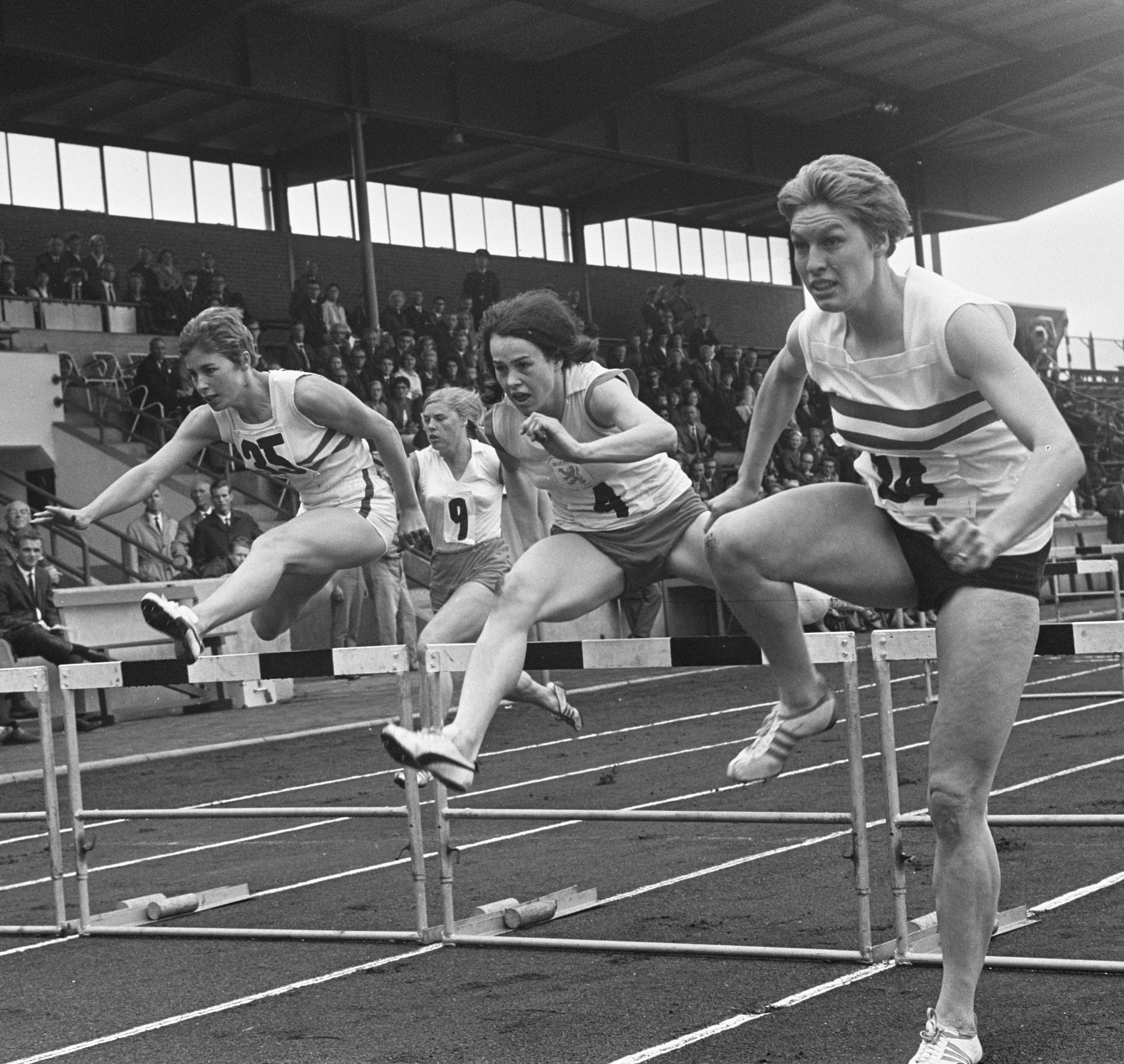
- Mary Rand, Lia Hinten and Pat Pryce in 1964

Personal information
- Nationality: British (English)
- Born: 4 January 1942 (age 84) Willesden, London, England
- Height: 1.73 m (5 ft 8 in)
- Weight: 64 kg (141 lb)

Sport
- Sport: Athletics
- Event: Hurdling
- Club: Ruislip & Northwood AC; Hillingdon AC

Patricia Anne Pryce (née Nutting; born 4 January 1942) is an English former hurdler who competed at the 1960, 1964 and 1968 summer Olympics.

== Biography ==
Nutting finished second behind Carole Quinton in the 80 metres hurdles event at the 1958 WAAA Championships and then third behind Mary Bignal the following year at the 1959 WAAA Championships and third behind Quinton in 1960.

At the 1960 Olympic Games in Rome, she represented Great Britain in the 80 metres hurdles event.

A WAAA title eluded her until she became the national 200 metres hurdles champion after winning the British WAAA Championships title at the 1961 WAAA Championships. The longer distance suited her and she retained the title at the 1962 WAAA Championships.

Later that year, Nutting represented England in the 80 metres hurdles and long jump at the 1962 British Empire and Commonwealth Games in Perth, Western Australia. At the 1963 WAAA Championships, Nutting won three titles, all over the hurdles at distances of 80, 100 and 200 metres.

Nutting married frederick Pryce in early 1964 and competed under her married name thereafter and she duly retained both the 80 and 100 metres title at the 1964 WAAA Championships.

Pryce competed in the 80 metres hurdles in the 1966 British Empire and Commonwealth Games in Kingston, Jamaica.

Pryce won her eighth and last WAAA Championships title in the 80 metres hurdles at 1968 WAAA Championships.
