= Daphne Arden =

British athlete (born 1941)

Daphne Arden (married name Slater)
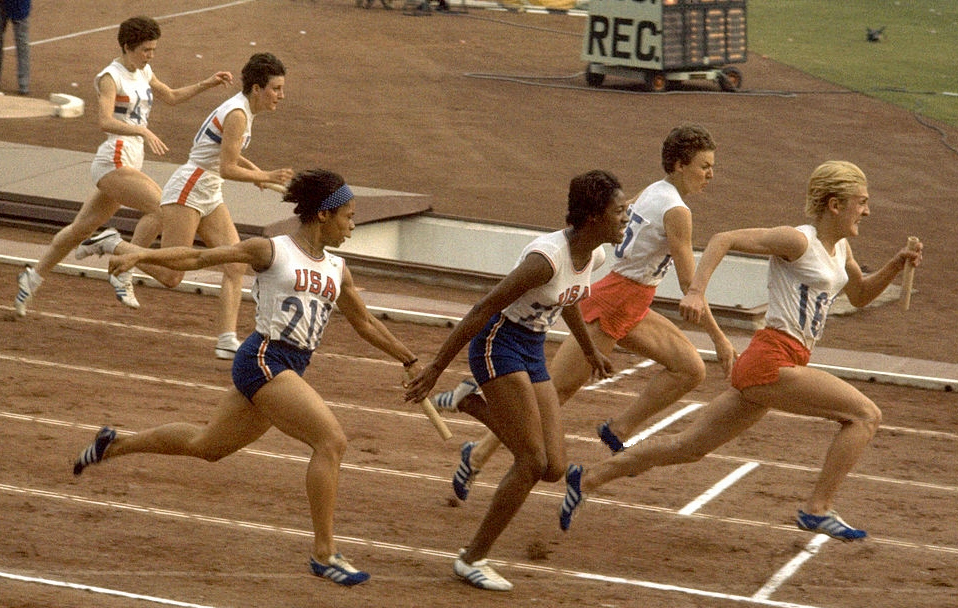
- Daphne Arden (top left) passes the baton to Dorothy Hyman in the Women's 4 × 100 m Relay Final at the 1964 Tokyo Olympics

Personal information
- Nationality: British (English)
- Born: 29 December 1941 (age 84) Birkenhead, England
- Height: 167 cm (5 ft 6 in)
- Weight: 60 kg (132 lb)

Sport
- Sport: Athletics
- Event: Sprints
- Club: Birchfield Harriers
Medal record
Women's Athletics
Representing Great Britain
Olympic Games
Bronze medal – third place	1964 Tokyo	4x100 metre relay
European Championships
Bronze medal – third place	1962 Belgrade	4 × 100 m relay
Representing England
Commonwealth Games
Silver medal – second place	1962 Perth	4 × 110 yd relay
Silver medal – second place	1966 Kingston	4 × 110 yd relay

Daphne Arden (married name Slater; born 29 December 1941) is a British retired athlete who competed at the 1964 Summer Olympics.

== Biography ==
Daphne Arden was born in Birkenhead and was educated at Moseley Secondary Modern School in Birmingham.

Arden finished third behind Jennifer Smart in the 100 and 220 yards events at the 1961 WAAA Championships, before finishing second and third respectively in the same events the following year at the 1962 WAAA Championships, but this time behind Dorothy Hyman.

Later in November 1962, she represented England and won a silver medal in the 4 × 110 yards relay at the 1962 British Empire and Commonwealth Games in Perth, Western Australia.

Arden once again finished behind Dorothy Hyman in the 100 yards at the 1963 WAAA Championships before finally becoming the national 100 yards champion and national 220 yards champion at the 1964 WAAA Championships and breaking the national records for both in the process. She then competed for Great Britain in the 1964 Olympic Games held in Tokyo, Japan in the 200 metres, finishing 8th in the final; and in the 4 × 100 metres, where she won the bronze medal with her teammates Janet Simpson, long jump gold medallist Mary Rand and Dorothy Hyman.

In 1965, Arden married Roger Slater in Solihull and competed under her married name thereafter.

Slater then regained her WAAA title at the 1966 WAAA Championships and one month later won another silver medal for the England team at the 1966 British Empire and Commonwealth Games in Kingston, Jamaica.
