= Vera Yugova =

Soviet sprinter

Personal information
- Nationality: Soviet
- Born: 25 June 1937 (age 88)

Sport
- Sport: Sprinting
- Event: 200 metres

Vera Yugova (born 25 June 1937) is a Soviet sprinter. She competed in the women's 200 metres at the 1956 Summer Olympics.
