= Christa Stubnick =

East German sprinter (1933–2021)

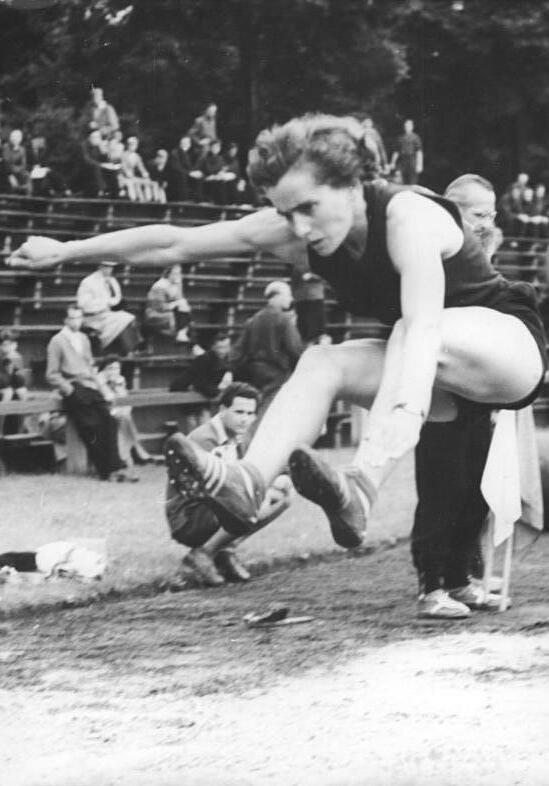
- Stubnick in 1956

Personal information
- Born: 12 December 1933 Gardelegen, Germany
- Died: 13 May 2021 (aged 87)
- Height: 159 cm (5 ft 3 in)
- Weight: 52 kg (115 lb)

Sport
- Sport: Athletics
- Event(s): Sprint, long jump
- Club: SC Dynamo Berlin

Achievements and titles
- Personal best(s): 100 m – 11.5 (1956); 200 m – 23.5 (1956); 400 m – 54.7 (1960); LJ – 6.03 m (1957)
Medal record
Women's athletics
Representing Germany
Olympic Games
Silver medal – second place	1956 Melbourne	100 m
Silver medal – second place	1956 Melbourne	200 m
European Championships
Bronze medal – third place	1958 Stockholm	100 m
World Student Games
Gold medal – first place	1954 Budapest	100 m
Gold medal – first place	1954 Budapest	200 m

Christa Stubnick (German pronunciation: [ˈkʁɪsta ˈʃtup̩ˌnɪk]; née Christa Seliger on 12 December 1933 – 13 May 2021) was an East German sprinter who competed for the United Team of Germany in the 1956 Summer Olympics. She won silver medals in the 100 m and 200 m events, splitting the Australians Betty Cuthbert (winner) and Marlene Matthews (third). Her 4 × 100 m relay team finished sixth.
