= Jenny Smart =

British sprinter

Personal information
- Nationality: British (English)
- Born: 19 February 1943 (age 82) Surbiton, England
- Height: 170 cm (5 ft 7 in)
- Weight: 61 kg (134 lb)

Sport
- Sport: Athletics
- Event: Sprinting
- Club: Spartan Ladies

Jennifer Ann Smart (born 19 February 1943) is a British retired sprinter who competed at the 1960 Summer Olympics.

== Biography ==
Smart finished second behind Dorothy Hyman in both the 100 and 220 yards events at the 1960 WAAA Championships.

At the 1960 Olympic Games in Rome, she represented Great Britain in the women's 100 metres competition.

Smart became the British national 100 yards champion and the national 220 yards champion after winning the British WAAA Championships titles at the 1961 WAAA Championships.
