= Halina Górecka =

Polish sprinter (born 1938)

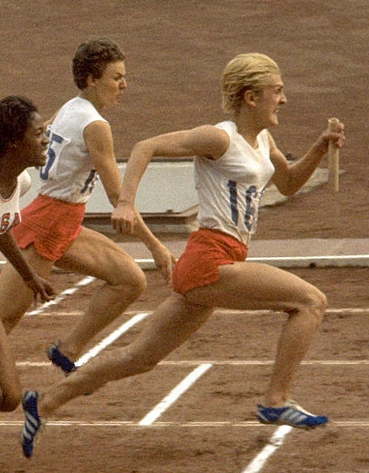
- Halina Górecka (left) and Ewa Kłobukowska at the 1964 Olympics

Personal information
- Born: 4 February 1938 (age 88) Chorzów, Poland
- Height: 1.67 m (5 ft 6 in)
- Weight: 57 kg (126 lb)

Sport
- Sport: Athletics
- Event: Sprint
- Club: AKS Chorzów; Górnik Zabrze; ASV Köln

Achievements and titles
- Personal bests: 100 m – 11.5 (1964); 200 m – 23.6 (1964)
Medal record
Representing Poland
Olympic Games
Bronze medal – third place	1960 Rome	4 × 100 m relay
Gold medal – first place	1964 Tokyo	4 × 100 m relay

Halina Sylwia Górecka (née Richter, later Herrmann; born 4 February 1938) is a retired Polish and German sprinter. At the Summer Olympics she competed for Poland in 1956, 1960 and 1964 and for West Germany in 1968. She won a bronze and a gold medal in the 4 × 100 m relay in 1960 and 1964, respectively. The Polish team set a world record in the 1964 final, but it was annulled after one teammate, Ewa Kłobukowska, failed a gender test in 1967.

In 1964 Górecka became a double champion of Poland: in 100 m and 200 m, adding to her earlier Polish title in the 4 × 100 m relay in 1954. In 1965, at an international meet in Dortmund, she defected to West Germany and went to Cologne to a friend Reinhold Herrmann. They married in 1966. Her appearance for West Germany at the 1968 Olympic Games in Mexico City did not result in any medals. In Germany Górecka worked as an office clerk. In 2012 her Olympic gold medal was stolen from her apartment.

== International competitions ==
Year	Competition	Venue	Position	Event	Notes
Representing Poland
1955	World Festival of Youth and Students	Warsaw, Poland	3rd	4 × 100 m relay	47.4
1956	Olympic Games	Melbourne, Australia	22nd (h)	100 m	12.38 (w)
1956	Olympic Games	Melbourne, Australia	8th (h)	4 × 100 m relay	46.58
1960	Olympic Games	Rome, Italy	8th (sf)	100 m	11.93
1960	Olympic Games	Rome, Italy	10th (h)	200 m	24.31^{1}
1960	Olympic Games	Rome, Italy	3rd	4 × 100 m relay	45.19
1962	European Championships	Belgrade, Yugoslavia	10th (sf)	100 m	12.0
1964	Olympic Games	Tokyo, Japan	7th	100 m	11.83
1964	Olympic Games	Tokyo, Japan	1st	4 × 100 m relay	43.6
Representing West Germany
1968	Olympic Games	Mexico City, Mexico	32nd (h)	100 m	11.88
1968	Olympic Games	Mexico City, Mexico	32nd (h)	200 m	24.62

^{1}Did not start in the semifinal
