= Heather Armitage =

British sprinter (born 1933)

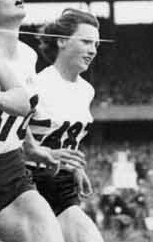
- Armitage at the 1956 Olympics

Personal information
- Born: 17 March 1933 (age 93) Colombo, British Ceylon
- Height: 171 cm (5 ft 7 in)
- Weight: 64 kg (141 lb)

Sport
- Sport: Athletics
- Event: Sprint
- Club: Longwood Harriers

Achievements and titles
- Personal best(s): 100 m – 11.6 (1956); 200 – 23.79y (1958)
Medal record
Women's athletics
Representing Great Britain
Olympic Games
Silver medal – second place	1956 Melbourne	4 × 100 m relay
Bronze medal – third place	1952 Helsinki	4 × 100 m relay
European Championships
Gold medal – first place	1958 Stockholm	100 m
Representing England
Commonwealth Games
Silver medal – second place	1954 Vancouver	4 × 110 yd relay
Gold medal – first place	1958 Cardiff	4 × 110 yd relay
Silver medal – second place	1958 Cardiff	100 yd
Bronze medal – third place	1958 Cardiff	220 yd

Heather Joy Armitage (later Young, then McClelland; born 17 March 1933) is a British retired sprinter and British record holder for the 100 yards.

== Biography ==
Armitage won her first major title representing Yorkshire in the all England schools 100 yards in 1951 aged 18.

Armitage became the national yards champion after winning the British WAAA Championships title at the 1952 WAAA Championships.

Shortly afterwards, Armitage represented Great Britain at the 1952 Olympic Games in Helsinki and won a bronze medal in the relay event with Sylvia Cheeseman, Jean Desforges and June Foulds.

At the 1956 Olympic Games, she competed in the 100 metres, 200 metres and 4 × 100 meres events and won a silver medal in the relay with Anne Pashley, June Foulds and Jean Scrivens. Her best individual achievement was sixth place in the 100 metres. Later the same year she married Frank Young and ran under the name Young.

Young became a double British champion after securing the national 100 yards title and the national 220 yards title, winning both events at the 1957 WAAA Championships.

One month after retaining her 220 yards national title at the 1958 WAAA Championships, she captained and represented England and won three medals at the 1958 Commonwealth Games in Cardiff including as the anchor in the English 4 × 110 yards relay team alongside Madeleine Weston, June Paul and anchor Dorothy Hyman that won the gold medal and set a new world record of 45.37 seconds in the process.

Later that year Young took 100 metres gold at the 1958 European Championships in Athletics in Stockholm, thereby becoming the first British woman to win an individual European track title. As of December 2006, she still holds the official British Record for the 100 yards.

== Post athletic career ==
She retired from competitions in 1960 and devoted herself to teaching, mostly on religious topics.
