= Letizia Bertoni =

Italian sprinter and hurdler

Personal information
- Nationality: Italian
- Born: 5 March 1937 (age 89) Milan, Italy
- Height: 1.70 m (5 ft 7 in)
- Weight: 60 kg (132 lb)

Sport
- Sport: Athletics
- Event(s): Hurdles; Sprint
- Club: SC Italia Milano Milano; SC Imec Bergamo

Achievements and titles
- Personal bests: 100 m: 11.9 (1960); 200 m: 24.6 (1961); 80 m hs: 11.0 (1963)
Medal record
Women's athletics
Representing Italy
European Championships
Bronze medal – third place	1954 Bern	4×100 m

Letizia Bertoni (born 5 March 1937) is a former Italian hurdler who competed at two Olympic Games.

== Biography ==
At the 1956 Olympic Games in Melbourne, Bertoni finished fifth in the 4 × 100 metres relay and also competed in the 200 metres.

Bertoni finished third behind Pat Nutting in the 80 metres hurdles event at the British 1963 WAAA Championships.

At her home Olympics, the 1960 Olympics in Rome, she once again finished in 5th place during the 4 × 100 metres relay, in addition to competing in the 80 metres hurdles.

Bertoni earned 33 caps in national team from 1953 to 1965 and won eight individual national championships.

== Achievements ==
Year	Competition	Venue	Position	Event	Performance	Note
1954	European Championships	(Switzerland) Bern	3rd	4 × 100 m relay	46.6	
1956	Olympic Games	(Australia) Melbourne	5th	4 × 100 m relay	45.7	
1960	Olympic Games	(Italy) Rome	5th	4 × 100 m relay	45.80	

== National titles ==
- 7 wins on 80 metres hurdles (1958, 1959, 1960, 1961, 1962, 1963, 1964)
- 1 win on 200 metres (1962)

== See also ==
- Italy national relay team
