= Valentyna Bolshova =

Ukrainian sprinter (1937–2023)

Valentyna Maslovskaya
Personal information
- Native name: Валенти́на Анатоліївна Масло́вська
- Nationality: Ukrainian
- Born: Valentyna Anatoliyivna Maslovskaya; 30 January 1937 Odesa, Ukrainian SSR, USSR
- Died: 21 May 2023 (aged 86) Palafrugell, Spain

Sport
- Sport: Sprinting
- Event: 200 metres
Medal record
Women's athletics
Representing Soviet Union
European Championships
Gold medal – first place	1958 Stockholm	4×100 m
Bronze medal – third place	1966 Budapest	4×100 m

Valentyna Anatoliyivna Bolshova (Ukrainian: Валенти́на Анато́ліївна Большо́ва; Russian: Валенти́на Анато́льевна Большо́ва; née Maslovskaya; 30 January 1937 – 21 May 2023) was a Ukrainian sprinter. She competed in the women's 200 metres at the 1960 Summer Olympics representing the Soviet Union.

Maslovskaya was the wife of Soviet athlete Viktor Bolshov, mother of Soviet-Moldovan athlete Olga Bolșova, and grandmother of Moldovan-Spanish tennis player Aliona Bolșova. Maslovskaya died on 21 May 2023 in Spain; she was previously misreported to have died in 2002.
