= Simone Henry =

French sprinter

Personal information
- Nationality: French
- Born: 3 May 1938 (age 87)

Sport
- Sport: Sprinting
- Event: 200 metres

Simone Henry (born 3 May 1938) is a French sprinter. She competed in the women's 200 metres at the 1956 Summer Olympics.
