= Gisela Birkemeyer =

German sprint runner (1931–2024)

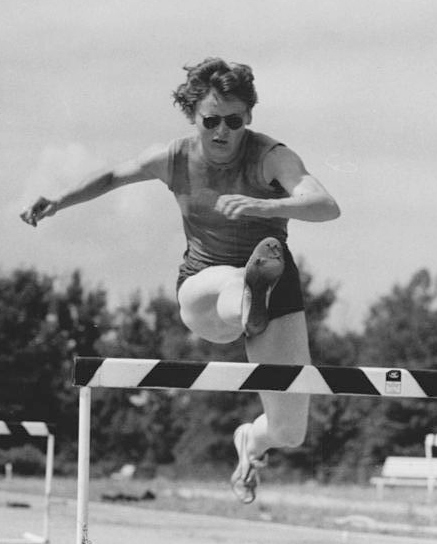
- Gisela Birkemeyer in 1960

Personal information
- Nationality: German
- Born: Gisela Köhler; 22 December 1931 Fasendorf, Germany
- Died: 26 March 2024 (aged 92) Berlin, Germany
- Height: 1.62 m (5 ft 4 in)
- Weight: 60 kg (132 lb)

Sport
- Sport: Sprint running, hurdles
- Club: SC Dynamo Berlin
Medal record
Women's athletics
Representing Germany
Olympic Games
Silver medal – second place	1956 Melbourne	80 m hurdles
Bronze medal – third place	1960 Rome	80 m hurdles
Representing East Germany
European Championships
Bronze medal – third place	1958 Stockholm	80 m hurdles

Gisela Birkemeyer (née Köhler, 22 December 1931 – 26 March 2024) was a German hurdler and sprinter who won two medals in the 80 m hurdles at the 1956 and 1960 Olympics. During her career she set nine world records in the 80 m hurdles and in the 4 × 100 m, 4 × 110 yd and 4 × 200 m relays. She won 40 East German championships, mostly in the 80 m hurdles (1953–1961) and 200 m sprint (1956–1960). At the European Championships in Stockholm in 1958, she was third in the 80 m hurdles. In 1959, she was voted GDR Sportswoman of the Year.

Earlier in 1957 she married Heinz Birkemeyer and from 1960 competed under his name. After retiring from competitions she worked as a coach. Birkemeyer later lived as a pensioner in Berlin Marzahn. She died in Berlin on 26 March 2024, at the age of 92.

Awards
Preceded by (East Germany) Karin Beyer	East German Sportswoman of the Year; 1959	Succeeded by (East Germany) Ingrid Krämer
