= 1958 European Athletics Championships =

6th European Athletics Championships
- Dates: 19 – 24 August
- Host city: Stockholm, Sweden
- Venue: Stockholms Olympiastadion
- Level: Senior
- Type: Outdoor
- Events: 36
- Participation: 626 athletes from 26 nations

The 6th European Athletics Championships were held from 19–24 August 1958 in the Olympic Stadium of Stockholm, Sweden. Contemporaneous reports on the event were given in the Glasgow Herald.

== Medal summary ==
Complete results were published.

=== Men ===
Event	Gold		Silver		Bronze	
100 metres	Armin Hary (FRG)	10.3 CR	Manfred Germar (FRG)	10.4	Peter Radford (GBR)	10.4
200 metres	Manfred Germar (FRG)	21.0	David Segal (GBR)	21.3	Jocelyn Delecour (FRA)	21.3
400 metres	John Wrighton (GBR)	46.3 CR	John Salisbury (GBR)	46.5	Karl-Friedrich Haas (FRG)	47.0
800 metres	Mike Rawson (GBR)	1:47.8	Audun Boysen (NOR)	1:47.9	Paul Schmidt (FRG)	1:47.9
1500 metres	Brian Hewson (GBR)	3:41.9 CR	Dan Waern (SWE)	3:42.1	Ron Delany (IRL)	3:42.3
5000 metres	Zdzisław Krzyszkowiak (POL)	13:53.4 CR	Kazimierz Zimny (POL)	13:55.2	Gordon Pirie (GBR)	14:01.6
10,000 metres	Zdzisław Krzyszkowiak (POL)	28:56.0 CR	Yevgeni Zhukov (URS)	28:58.6	Nikolay Pudov (URS)	29:02.2
110 metres hurdles	Martin Lauer (FRG)	13.7 CR	Stanko Lorger (YUG)	14.1	Anatoly Mikhailov (URS)	14.4
400 metres hurdles	Yuriy Lituyev (URS)	51.1	Per-Ove Trollsås (SWE)	51.6	Bruno Galliker (SUI)	51.8
3000 metres steeplechase	Jerzy Chromik (POL)	8:38.2 CR	Semyon Rzhishchin (URS)	8:38.8	Hans Huneke (FRG)	8:43.6
4 × 100 metres relay	West Germany; Walter Mahlendorf; Armin Hary; Heinz Fütterer; Manfred Germar	40.2 CR	Great Britain; Peter Radford; Roy Sandstrom; David Segal; Adrian Breacker	40.2	Soviet Union; Boris Tokarev; Edvin Ozolin; Yuriy Konovalov; Leonid Bartenev	40.2
4 × 400 metres relay	Great Britain; Ted Sampson; John MacIsaac; John Wrighton; John Salisbury	3:07.9 CR	West Germany; Carl Kaufmann; Manfred Poerschke; Johannes Kaiser; Karl-Friedrich Haas	3:08.2	Sweden; Nils Holmberg; Hans Lindgren; Lennart Johnssson; Alf Petersson	3:10.7
Marathon	Sergei Popov (URS)	2:15:17.0 CR	Ivan Filin (URS)	2:20:50.6	Frederick Norris (GBR)	2:21:15.0
20 kilometres walk	Stan Vickers (GBR)	1:33:09.0	Leonid Spirin (URS)	1:35:04.2	Lennart Back (SWE)	1:35:22.2
50 kilometres walk	Yevgeniy Maskinskov (URS)	4:17:15.4 CR	Abdon Pamich (ITA)	4:18:00.0	Max Weber (GDR)	4:19:58.6
High jump	Rickard Dahl (SWE)	2.12 m CR	Jiří Lanský (TCH)	2.10 m	Stig Pettersson (SWE)	2.10 m
Pole vault	Eeles Landström (FIN)	4.50 m CR	Manfred Preussger (GDR)	4.50 m	Vladimir Bulatov (URS)	4.50 m
Long jump	Igor Ter-Ovanesyan (URS)	7.81 m CR	Kazimierz Kropidłowski (POL)	7.67 m	Henryk Grabowski (POL)	7.51 m
Triple jump	Józef Schmidt (POL)	16.43 m CR	Oleg Ryakhovskiy (URS)	16.02 m	Vilhjálmur Einarsson (ISL)	16.00 m
Shot put	Arthur Rowe (GBR)	17.78 m CR	Viktor Lipsnis (URS)	17.47 m	Jiří Skobla (TCH)	17.12 m
Discus throw	Edmund Piątkowski (POL)	53.92 m CR	Todor Artarski (BUL)	53.82 m	Vladimir Trusenyev (URS)	53.74 m
Javelin throw	Janusz Sidło (POL)	80.16 m CR	Egil Danielsen (NOR)	78.27 m	Gergely Kulcsár (HUN)	75.25 m
Hammer throw	Tadeusz Rut (POL)	64.78 m CR	Mikhail Krivonosov (URS)	63.78 m	Gyula Zsivótzky (HUN)	63.68 m
Decathlon	Vasili Kuznetsov (URS)	7865 pts CR	Uno Palu (URS)	7329 pts	Walter Meier (GDR)	7249 pts

=== Women ===
Event	Gold		Silver		Bronze	
100 metres	Heather Young (GBR)	11.7 =CR	Vera Krepkina (URS)	11.7	Christa Stubnick (GDR)	11.8
200 metres	Barbara Janiszewska (POL)	24.1	Hannelore Sadau (GDR)	24.3	Maria Itkina (URS)	24.3
400 metres	Maria Itkina (URS)	53.7 CR	Yekaterina Parlyuk (URS)	54.8	Moyra Hiscox (GBR)	55.7
800 metres	Yelizaveta Yermolayeva (URS)	2:06.3 CR	Diane Leather (GBR)	2:06.6	Dzidra Levitska (URS)	2:06.6
4 × 100 metres relay	Soviet Union; Vera Krepkina; Linda Kepp; Nina Polyakova; Valentina Maslovskaya	45.3 CR	Great Britain; Madeleine Weston; Dorothy Hyman; Marianne Dew; Carole Quinton	46.0	Poland; Maria Chojnacka; Barbara Janiszewska; Celina Jesionowska; Maria Bibro	46.0
80 metres hurdles	Galina Bystrova (URS)	10.9 CR	Zenta Kopp (FRG)	10.9	Gisela Birkemeyer (GDR)	11.0
Long jump	Liesel Jakobi (FRG)	6.14 m CR	Valentina Lituyeva (URS)	6.00 m	Nina Protchenko (URS)	5.99 m
High jump	Iolanda Balaş (ROU)	1.77 m CR	Taisia Chenchik (URS)	1.70 m	Dorothy Shirley (GBR)	1.67 m
Shot put	Marianne Werner (FRG)	15.74 m CR	Tamara Tyshkevich (URS)	15.54 m	Tamara Press (URS)	15.53 m
Discus throw	Tamara Press (URS)	53.32 m CR	Štěpánka Mertová (TCH)	52.19 m	Kriemhild Hausmann (FRG)	50.99 m
Javelin throw	Dana Zátopková (TCH)	56.02 m CR	Birutė Zalogaitytė (URS)	51.30 m	Jutta Neumann (FRG)	50.50 m
Pentathlon	Galina Bystrova (URS)	4733 pts CR	Nina Vinogradova (URS)	4627 pts	Edeltraud Eiberle (FRG)	4545 pts

== Medal table ==
Rank	Nation	Gold	Silver	Bronze	Total
1	Soviet Union (URS)	11	15	9	35
2	Poland (POL)	8	2	2	12
3	Great Britain (GBR)	7	5	5	17
4	West Germany (FRG)	6	3	6	15
5	Sweden (SWE)	1	2	3	6
6	Czechoslovakia (TCH)	1	2	1	4
7	Finland (FIN)	1	0	0	1
7	Romania (ROM)	1	0	0	1
9	East Germany (GDR)	0	2	4	6
10	Norway (NOR)	0	2	0	2
11	Bulgaria (BUL)	0	1	0	1
11	Italy (ITA)	0	1	0	1
11	Yugoslavia (SFR Yugoslavia)	0	1	0	1
14	Hungary (HUN)	0	0	2	2
15	France (FRA)	0	0	1	1
15	Iceland (ISL)	0	0	1	1
15	Ireland (IRL)	0	0	1	1
15	Switzerland (SUI)	0	0	1	1
Totals (18 entries)		36	36	36	108

== Participation ==
According to an unofficial count, 629 athletes from 26 countries participated in the event, three athletes more than the official number of 626 as published. A joint German team comprising athletes from both East and West Germany was competing. Assignment of the athletes to East or West Germany was accomplished using the database of Deutsche Gesellschaft für Leichtathletik-Dokumentation 1990 e.V.

- Austria (15)
- Belgium (13)
- Bulgaria (8)
- Czechoslovakia (24)
- Denmark (9)
- Finland (29)
- France (38)
- Germany (76)
  - East Germany (25)
  - West Germany (51)
- Great Britain (55)
- Greece (14)
- Hungary (22)
- Iceland (9)
- Ireland (4)
- Italy (35)
- Malta (1)
- Netherlands (21)
- Norway (25)
- Poland (49)
- Portugal (1)
- Romania (7)
- Soviet Union (68)
- Spain (7)
- Sweden (48)
- Switzerland (23)
- Turkey (5)
- Yugoslavia (23)
