= Olga Šikovec =

Croatian sprinter (1933–2023)

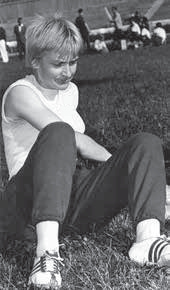

Personal information
- Born: 17 January 1933 Trbovlje, Slovenia
- Died: 4 April 2023 (aged 90) Zagreb, Croatia
- Height: 162 cm (5 ft 4 in)
- Weight: 60 kg (132 lb)

Sport
- Sport: Athletics
- Event: Sprint
- Club: AD Kladivar, Celje

Achievements and titles
- Highest world ranking: 20
- Personal best(s): 100 m – 11.7 (1961); 200 m – 24.2 (1961)

Olga Šikovec (later Luncer, 17 January 1933 – 4 April 2023) was a Croatian sprinter of Slovenian origin. She competed for Yugoslavia at the 1960 Summer Olympics in the 100 m and 200 m events, but failed to reach the finals. Two years later she was part of the Yugoslav 4 × 100 m relay team that finished fourth at the European championships and set a national record.

Šikovec had a brother Rudi and sister Sonja; they lost their father in World War II. At school she played volleyball and table tennis, and changed to athletics in 1953. In 1959 she married a well known sports journalist Vilko Luncer, and in 1961 moved from Trbovlje to Zagreb. Between 1955 and 1965 she won 24 Yugoslav titles over 60 m, 100 m and 200 m distances, and was named as Slovenian (1960) and Croatian (1962) Athlete of the Year. She retired from competitions in 1966 and later worked as a sports administrator and referee. Following an example of her husband, who was a long-term editor for the Zagreb Sports News, she also wrote on sport-related topics. Her son Bojan Luncer became a middle-distance runner and a member of the Yugoslav junior team and Croatian champion in 800m and 4x400m relay. He was first founding CEO of Lidl Croatia and Lidl International Board Member later.

Olga Šikovec died in Zagreb on 4 April 2023, at the age of 90.
