= Snezhana Kerkova =

Bulgarian sprinter (born 1938)

Personal information
- Nationality: Bulgarian
- Born: 30 January 1938 (age 88) Sofia, Bulgaria

Sport
- Sport: Sprinting
- Event: 100 metres
Medal record
Representing Bulgaria
Summer Universiade
| Silver medal – second place | 1959 Turin | 80m hurdles |
| Silver medal – second place | 1965 Budapest | 80m hurdles |
| Bronze medal – third place | 1961 Sofia | 80m hurdles |

Snezhana Angelova Kerkova (married Dzhalova; born 30 January 1938) is a Bulgarian sprinter. She competed in the women's 100 metres at the 1960 Summer Olympics.
