= Maria Itkina =

Soviet sprinter (1932–2020)

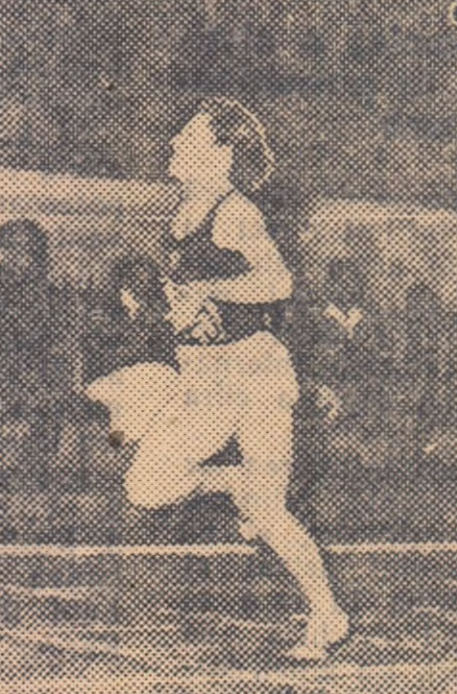
- Maria Itkina in 1955

Personal information
- Born: 3 May 1932 Roslavl, RSFSR, USSR
- Died: 1 December 2020 (aged 88) Minsk, Belarus
- Height: 1.66 m (5 ft 5 in)
- Weight: 62 kg (137 lb)

Sport
- Sport: Athletics
- Event: 60–400 m
- Club: Spartak Minsk; Dynamo Minsk

Achievements and titles
- Personal best(s): 100 m – 11.4 (1960); 200 m – 23.4 (1956); 400 m – 52.9 (1965)
Medal record
Women's athletics
Representing the Soviet Union
European Championships
| Gold medal – first place | 1954 Bern | 200 m |
| Gold medal – first place | 1954 Bern | 4×100 m |
| Gold medal – first place | 1958 Stockholm | 400 m |
| Gold medal – first place | 1962 Belgrade | 400 m |
| Bronze medal – third place | 1958 Stockholm | 200 m |

Maria (also "Mariya" and "Marina") Leontievna Itkina (Belarusian: Марыя Лявонцеўна Іткіна; Russian: Мария Леонтьевна Иткина; 3 May 1932 – 1 December 2020) was a Soviet runner who set multiple world records in various sprint events. She competed at the 1956, 1960, and 1964 Olympics and finished four times in fourth place. Domestically Itkina held 17 Soviet sprint titles.

== Early life ==
Itkina was born in Roslavl in the Smolensk region of the Soviet Union on 3 May 1932. She later moved with her family to Minsk in the Byelorussian Soviet Socialist Republic. Itkina competed in athletics for Spartak Minsk and Dynamo Minsk. She graduated from the Belarusian State University of Physical Culture in 1957. Itkina came to specialise in sprint races, competing in the 100 m, 200 m, 400 m and 4 × 100 m relay. She won 32 USSR championship titles and set 18 national records. Itkina won a sprint event at the first Spartakiad of the Peoples of the USSR in 1956.

== Competitions ==
Itkina won four European titles: one in the 200 m (24.3 s, 1954), one in the 4 × 100 m relay (1954), and two in the 400 m (53.7 s in 1958 and 53.4 s in 1962). She also won the 200 m sprint at the 1957 World University Games in Paris, in 24.6 seconds.

In her three Olympics, Itkina came in fourth in four events: the 4 × 100 m relay in 1956 and 1960, and the 100 m and 200 m sprint in 1960; she finished fifth in the 400 m in 1964. Her differences with the bronze medalists in the individual events were 0.06, 0.03 and 0.2 seconds, respectively. In 1956 she was eliminated in the 200 m semi-finals coming in 0.01 seconds behind the qualifier Norma Croker. Itkina also won a sprint event at the first (1965) European Cup.

== Records ==
In July 1956, Itkina set a 220-yard world record of 23.6 seconds, yet her favorite events were the 400 m and 440 yd, in which she set at least four world records between 1957 and 1962, improving the record from 54.0 to 53.4 seconds. The only other female athlete to break multiple 400 m records was Marita Koch.

In 1960 Itkina ran her personal best of 11.4 seconds in the 100 meter sprint, which remained a world-top level result for many decades. In 1961, she tied the indoor 60 meter world record of 7.3 seconds, and in 1963 she was part of the Soviet 800-meter relay team that set a world record of 1.34.7.

== Awards ==
Itkina was recognised as an Honoured Master of Sports of the USSR and an Honoured Trainer of the Byelorussian Soviet Socialist Republic. In 1957 she was appointed a member of the Order of the Badge of Honour and in 1960 was awarded the Medal "For Labour Valour". In 2000 she was awarded the IOC Prize for Contribution to the Olympic Movement and in 2006 became a third class member of the Russian Order "For Merit to the Fatherland".

== Personal life ==
Itkina was Jewish. In 1991 she was inducted into the International Jewish Sports Hall of Fame.

Itkina died in Belarus on 1 December 2020.

== See also ==
- List of select Jewish track and field athletes

Records
| Preceded by (Soviet Union) Polina Lazareva | Women's 400 metres World Record Holder; 8 June 1957 – 23 October 1962 | Succeeded by (North Korea) Shin Geum-Dan |
