= Micheline Fluchot =

French sprinter

Personal information
- Nationality: French
- Born: 1 November 1934 (age 91) Paris, France

Sport
- Sport: Sprinting
- Event: 100 metres

Micheline Fluchot (born 1 November 1934) is a French sprinter. She competed in the women's 100 metres at the 1956 Summer Olympics.
