= Dorothy Hyman =

English sprinter (born 1941)

Dorothy Hyman MBE
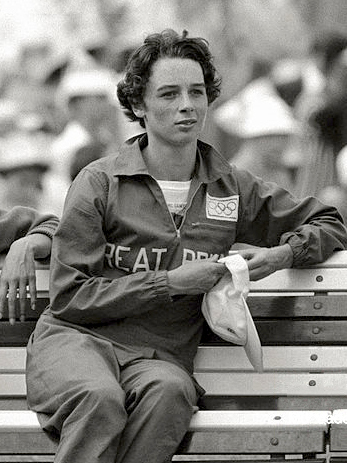
- Dorothy Hyman at the 1960 Olympics

Personal information
- Born: 9 May 1941 (age 85) Cudworth, Yorkshire, England
- Height: 1.70 m (5 ft 7 in)
- Weight: 59 kg (130 lb)

Sport
- Sport: Athletics
- Events: 100 m, 200 m
- Club: Hickleton Main YC

Achievements and titles
- Personal bests: 100 m – 11.3 (1963); 200 m – 23.2 (1963)
Medal record
Women's athletics
Representing Great Britain
Olympic Games
Silver medal – second place	1960 Rome	100 m
Bronze medal – third place	1960 Rome	200 m
Bronze medal – third place	1964 Tokyo	4×100 m
European Championships
Gold medal – first place	1962 Belgrade	100 m
Silver medal – second place	1958 Stockholm	4×100 m
Silver medal – second place	1962 Belgrade	200 m
Bronze medal – third place	1962 Belgrade	4×100 m
Representing England
Commonwealth Games
Gold medal – first place	1958 Cardiff	4×110 yd
Gold medal – first place	1962 Perth	100 yd
Gold medal – first place	1962 Perth	220 yd
Silver medal – second place	1962 Perth	4×110 yd

Dorothy Hyman MBE (born 9 May 1941) is an English retired sprinter. She competed at the 1960 and 1964 Summer Olympics in the 100 m, 200 m and 4 × 100 m events, winning three medals. She also won individual 100 m gold and 200 m silver at the 1962 European Championships in Belgrade and, representing England, completed the 100 yd/220 yd sprint double at the 1962 Commonwealth Games.

Winner of the 1963 BBC Sports Personality of the Year award, she has a stadium in her home village of Cudworth named in her honour. She was appointed Member of the Order of the British Empire (MBE) in the 1965 Birthday Honours for services to Women's Athletics, and in 2011 she was inducted into the England Athletics Hall of Fame.

== Early life ==
Hyman was born on 9 May 1941 in Cudworth, West Riding of Yorkshire, to a family of five. Her father was a coal miner and it was he who first noticed her natural talent for sprinting. She started training from the age of 13, but it took a lot of commitment because the nearest track was 8 miles away. "Each journey involved two buses," she said later. "It was a case of finish work, eat, get the bus, train, get the bus home and go to bed, each day."

Hyman established herself over the next few years as one of England's best upcoming sprinters, becoming junior champion at every age group.

== Senior career ==
At the age of just 17 she participated in the 1958 Commonwealth Games and reached the semi-final of the 100 yd event, but more significantly she was a member of the English 4 × 110 yards relay team alongside Madeleine Weston, June Paul and anchor Heather Armitage that won the gold medal and set a new world record of 45.37 seconds in the process.

Later in 1958 she competed in the European Athletics Championships and won a silver medal as part of the English women's 4 × 100 m relay team, a result that set the platform for her to compete at a global level in the 1960 Summer Olympics.

Hyman completed a 'double double' of the 100 yards and 220 yards events at the WAAA Championships, when winning both sprints at the 1959 WAAA Championships and 1960 WAAA Championships.

Although Hyman was not expected to rank amongst the medallists at the Olympics, and likely not even reach the finals, she finished first in both her heat and semifinal runs for the 100 metres. In the final she led for much of the race before being overtaken by American Wilma Rudolph, finishing in second place for a silver medal. Hyman also medalled in the 200 m, finishing third.

=== 1962–1963 ===
It was in 1962 when Dorothy Hyman confirmed her status as one of the world's best sprinters. At the 1962 Commonwealth Games in Perth, she achieved the sprint double, winning both the 100 yd and 220 yd races. Additionally, she won a silver medal as part of the English 4 × 110 yd relay team.

At the 1962 European Championships, Hyman continued her form, winning gold in the 100 m, silver in the 200 m, and helping the English team to bronze in the 4 × 100 m relay. Hyman's winning time of 11.3 seconds in the 100 m would have been a new European record except that the wind was above permitted levels.

There were no international championships during 1963 but Hyman dominated in national events, going unbeaten in the 100 m and setting her personal best of 11.3, equalling the European record and only 0.1 outside the world record. She also set a new British record of 23.2 in the 200 m, and once again contributed to a world record in the 4 × 110 yd relay, setting a time of 45.2 on 5 August.

In recognition of her unbeaten national season and new records, Hyman was presented with the 1963 BBC Sports Personality of the Year Award.

=== Later career ===
Hyman's preparations for the 1964 Summer Olympics were derailed by injury, and as a result she could only achieve a bronze medal in the 4 × 100 m relay. Despite being only 23 years of age, Hyman retired from the track at the end of 1964. In 1965 she wrote an autobiography titled Sprint to Fame.

Hyman started to coach voluntarily at the Dorothy Hyman Track Club in Cudworth, at a stadium that had been named after her. By 1969, Hyman was reconsidering her decision to retire. She later said, "I was 24 and I felt I was ready to finish, but five years later I was running faster than I had all my life." However she had surrendered her amateur status by writing her autobiography, and so was only able to compete nationally. She made a significant comeback at the 1969 WAAA Championships, winning the 200 metres and finishing second behind Chi Cheng in the 100 metres. She retired from sprinting for good soon after. "I could not run internationally so there did not seem much point in the end."

In 2011 Hyman was inducted into the England Athletics Hall of Fame.

== Personal life ==
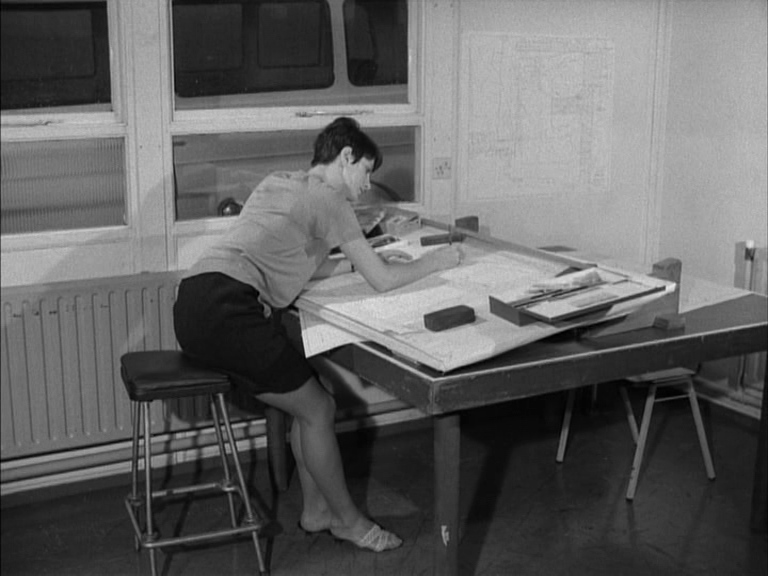
Dorothy Hyman depicted working as a tracer in Mining Review 22nd year No.5

Hyman's father was a miner, and for 30 years, even while competing nationally, she worked as a tracer for the National Coal Board in Cudworth. She retired after publishing her book, Sprint to Fame. In 1994 she lived in Stairfoot, Barnsley.

== National titles ==
- 4-times national 100y/100m champion (1959–1960, 1962–1963)
- 5-times national 200y/200m champion (1959–1960, 1962–1963, 1969)

== International competitions ==
Year	Competition	Venue	Position	Event	Notes
Representing Great Britain
1958	European Athletics Championships	Stockholm, Sweden	semifinal	100 m	12.3
1958	European Athletics Championships	Stockholm, Sweden	2nd	4 × 100 m relay	46.0
1960	Olympic Games	Rome, Italy	2nd	100 m	11.43
1960	Olympic Games	Rome, Italy	3rd	200 m	24.82
1960	Olympic Games	Rome, Italy	6th	4 × 100 m relay	DNF
1962	European Athletics Championships	Belgrade, Yugoslavia	1st	100 m	11.3
1962	European Athletics Championships	Belgrade, Yugoslavia	2nd	200 m	23.7
1962	European Athletics Championships	Belgrade, Yugoslavia	3rd	4 × 100 m relay	44.9
1964	Olympic Games	Tokyo, Japan	8th	100 m	11.9
1964	Olympic Games	Tokyo, Japan	semifinal	200 m	23.9
1964	Olympic Games	Tokyo, Japan	3rd	4 × 100 m relay	44.9
Representing England
1958	Commonwealth Games	Cardiff, Wales	semifinal	100 yd	11.1
1958	Commonwealth Games	Cardiff, Wales	1st	4 × 110 yd relay	45.37
1962	Commonwealth Games	Perth, Western Australia	1st	100 yd	11.2
1962	Commonwealth Games	Perth, Western Australia	1st	220 yd	23.8
1962	Commonwealth Games	Perth, Western Australia	2nd	4 × 110 yd relay	46.6

Notes:

- DNS = did not start. DNF = did not finish
- All AAA results from GBR Athletics.

Awards
Preceded by Anita Lonsbrough	BBC Sports Personality of the Year; 1963	Succeeded by Mary Rand
