= Catherine Capdevielle =

French sprinter

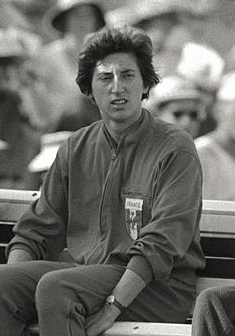
- Catherine Capdevielle at the 1960 Olympics

Personal information
- Born: 2 September 1938 (age 87) Agnos, France
- Height: 1.74 m (5 ft 9 in)
- Weight: 65 kg (143 lb)

Sport
- Sport: Athletics
- Event(s): 100 m, 200 m
- Club: FC Oloron

Achievements and titles
- Personal best(s): 100 m – 11.4 (1960); 200 m – 23.7 (1960)
Medal record
Representing France
Summer Universiade
Bronze medal – third place	1959 Turin	100 m

Catherine Capdevielle (born 2 September 1938) is a retired French sprinter. She competed at the 1956 and 1960 Olympics in various sprint events and finished fifth in the 100 m in 1960. She won a bronze medal in the 100 m at the 1959 Summer Universiade.
