= Giuseppina Leone =

Italian sprinter

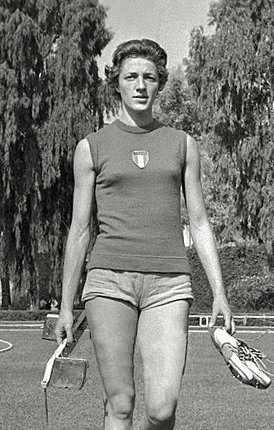
- Giuseppina Leone at the 1960 Olympics

Personal information
- Nationality: Italian
- Born: 21 December 1934 (age 91) Turin, Italy
- Height: 1.68 m (5 ft 6 in)
- Weight: 58 kg (128 lb)

Sport
- Country: Italy
- Sport: Athletics
- Event: Sprint
- Club: Sipra Torino; Fiat Torino

Achievements and titles
- Personal bests: 100 m: 11.4 (1956); 200 m: 23.7 (1960)
Medal record
Women's athletics
Representing Italy
Olympic Games
Bronze medal – third place	1960 Rome	100 m
European Championships
Bronze medal – third place	1954 Bern	4×100 m
Summer Universiade
Gold medal – first place	1959 Turin	100 m
Gold medal – first place	1959 Turin	200 m
Silver medal – second place	1959 Turin	4×100 m

Giuseppina "Giusy" Leone (born 21 December 1934) is a retired Italian sprinter. She competed in the 100 m, 200 m and 4 × 100 m events at the 1952, 1956 and 1960 Olympics and reached the final on five occasions. In 1960 she won a bronze medal in the 100 m.

== Achievements ==
Year	Competition	Venue	Position	Event	Performance	Note
1954	European Championships	(Switzerland) Bern	3rd	4 × 100 m relay	46.6	
1960	Olympic Games	(Italy) Rome	3rd	100 metres	11.3	
1960	Olympic Games	(Italy) Rome	6th	200 metres	24.9	

== See also ==
- Italian Athletics Championships - Multi winners
- Italy national relay team
