= Athletics at the 1960 Summer Olympics – Women's high jump =

Women's high jump at the Games of the XVII Olympiad
- Venue: Olympic Stadium
- Dates: September 8, 1960
- Competitors: 23 from 15 nations
- Winning height: 1.85 OR

Medalists
1st place, gold medalist(s)		Iolanda Balaș; Romania
2nd place, silver medalist(s)		Dorothy Shirley; Great Britain
2nd place, silver medalist(s)		Jarosława Jóźwiakowska; Poland

The women's high jump field event at the 1960 Olympic Games took place on September 8.

== Results ==
Top 12 jumpers and ties and all jumpers clearing 1.65 metres advanced to the finals. All heights are listed in metres.

=== Qualifying ===
Rank	Name	Nationality	Mark	1.50	1.55	1.60	1.65
1	Iolanda Balaș	Romania	1.65	p	p	o	o
2T	Valentina Ballod	Soviet Union	1.65	p	o	o	o
2T	Marlene Schmitz-Portz	United Team of Germany	1.65	p	o	o	o
4T	Ingrid Becker	United Team of Germany	1.65	o	o	o	o
4T	Jarosława Jóźwiakowska	Poland	1.65	o	o	o	o
4T	Dorothy Shirley	Great Britain	1.65	o	o	o	o
7T	Olga Gere	Yugoslavia	1.65	o	o	o	xo
7T	Inga-Britt Lorentzon	Sweden	1.65	o	o	o	xo
7T	Neomia Rogers	United States	1.65	o	o	o	xo
10T	Taisiya Chenchik	Soviet Union	1.65	o	o	xo	xo
10T	Florence Pétry	France	1.65	o	xo	o	xo
12	Frances Slaap	Great Britain	1.65	o	xxo	o	xo
13	Helen Frith	Australia	1.65	o	p	o	xxo
14T	Galina Dolya	Soviet Union	1.65	o	o	o	xxo
14T	Nel Zwier	Netherlands	1.65	o	o	o	xxo
16T	Diny Hobers	Netherlands	1.60	o	o	o	xxx
16T	Karin Lenzke	United Team of Germany	1.60	o	o	o	xxx
18	Mette Oxvang	Denmark	1.60	o	o	xo	xxx
19	Marinella Bortoluzzi	Italy	1.55	o	o	xxx	
20	Brenda Archer	Guyana	1.55	o	xo	xxx	
21T	Barbara Brown	United States	1.50	o	xxx		
21T	Jean Gaertner	United States	1.50	o	xxx		
23	Canel Konvur	Turkey	1.50	xxo	xxx		
	Wu Jin-Yun	Chinese Taipei	DNS				

=== Final ===
Rank	Name	Nationality	Mark	1.55	1.60	1.65	1.68	1.71	1.73	1.75	1.77	1.81	1.85	1.87	Notes
1st place, gold medalist(s)	Iolanda Balaș	Romania	1.85	p	o	p	o	o	o	o	o	xo	xxo	xxp	OR
2nd place, silver medalist(s)	Jarosława Jóźwiakowska	Poland	1.71	p	o	o	o	o	xxx						
2nd place, silver medalist(s)	Dorothy Shirley	Great Britain	1.71	p	o	o	o	o	xxx						
4	Galina Dolya	Soviet Union	1.71	o	o	xo	o	xxo							
5	Taisiya Chenchik	Soviet Union	1.68	o	o	o	o	xxx							
6T	Helen Frith	Australia	1.65	o	o	o	xxx								
6T	Inga-Britt Lorentzon	Sweden	1.65	o	o	o	xxx								
6T	Frances Slaap	Great Britain	1.65	o	o	o	xxx								
9T	Ingrid Becker	United Team of Germany	1.65	o	o	xo	xxx								
9T	Nel Zwier	Netherlands	1.65	o	o	xo	xxx								
9T	Florence Pétry	France	1.65	o	o	xo	xxx								
9T	Marlene Schmitz	United Team of Germany	1.65	o	o	xo	xxx								
9T	Olga Gere	Yugoslavia	1.65	o	o	xo	xxx								
14	Neomia Rogers	United States	1.65	xo	xxo	xo	xxx								
15	Valentina Ballod	Soviet Union	1.65	o	xo	xxo	xxx								

Key: OR = Olympic record; o = clear; p = pass; x = fail
