= Athletics at the 1956 Summer Olympics – Women's high jump =

Women's high jump at the Games of the XVI Olympiad
- Venue: Melbourne Cricket Ground
- Competitors: 19 from 12 nations
- Winning height: 1.76 WR

Medalists
1st place, gold medalist(s)		Mildred McDaniel; United States
2nd place, silver medalist(s)		Thelma Hopkins; Great Britain
2nd place, silver medalist(s)		Mariya Pisareva; Soviet Union

The women's high jump was an event at the 1956 Summer Olympics in Melbourne, Australia. The qualification round mark was set at 1.58 metres. Just one athlete, Ann Marie Flynn from the United States, did not surpass that height in the morning qualification round.

== Results ==
=== Qualification ===
Qualifying height: 1.58 metres

Rank	Athlete	Nation	1.40	1.50	1.55	1.58	Result	Notes
1	Thelma Hopkins	Great Britain	–	–	o	o	1.58	Q
1	Iolanda Balaș	Romania	–	–	o	o	1.58	Q
1	Gunhild Larking	Sweden	–	o	–	o	1.58	Q
4	Reinelde Knapp	Austria	–	o	o	o	1.58	Q
4	Dorothy Tyler	Great Britain	–	o	o	o	1.58	Q
4	Hermina Geyser	South Africa	–	o	o	o	1.58	Q
7	Michele Mason	Australia	o	o	o	o	1.58	Q
7	Jessie Donaghy	New Zealand	o	o	o	o	1.58	Q
7	Jiřina Vobořilová	Czechoslovakia	o	o	o	o	1.58	Q
7	Mariya Pisareva	Soviet Union	o	o	o	o	1.58	Q
7	Mildred McDaniel	United States	o	o	o	o	1.58	Q
12	Audrey Bennett	Great Britain	–	o	xo	o	1.58	Q
13	Olga Modrachová	Czechoslovakia	–	o	o	xo	1.58	Q
14	Carol Bernoth	Australia	o	o	o	xo	1.58	Q
14	Valentina Ballod	Soviet Union	o	o	o	xo	1.58	Q
16	Alice Whitty	Canada	o	xo	o	xo	1.58	Q
17	Inge Kilian	United Team of Germany	–	xo	o	xxo	1.58	Q
18	Janice Cooper	Australia	o	o	xxo	xxo	1.58	Q
19	Ann Marie Flynn	United States	o	xo	xxx		1.50	
	Paola Paternoster	Italy					DNS	

=== Final ===
Rank	Athlete	Nation	1.40	1.50	1.55	1.60	1.64	1.67	1.70	1.76	1.80	Result	Notes
1st place, gold medalist(s)	Mildred McDaniel	United States	o	o	o	xo	o	o	xo	xo	xxx	1.76	WR
2nd place, silver medalist(s)	Thelma Hopkins	Great Britain	–	–	o	o	o	o	xxx			1.67	
2nd place, silver medalist(s)	Mariya Pisareva	Soviet Union	–	–	o	o	o	o	xxx			1.67	
4	Gunhild Larking	Sweden	–	–	o	xxo	xo	o	xxx			1.67	
5	Iolanda Balaș	Romania	–	–	o	o	o	xo	xxx			1.67	
6	Michele Mason	Australia	o	–	o	o	o	xxo	xxx			1.67	
7	Jessie Donaghy	New Zealand	–	o	o	o	xo	xxo	xxx			1.67	
8	Hermina Geyser	South Africa	–	o	o	o	o	xxx				1.64	
8	Jiřina Vobořilová	Czechoslovakia	–	o	o	o	o	xxx				1.64	
10	Olga Modrachová	Czechoslovakia	–	–	o	o	xo	xxx				1.64	
11	Valentina Ballod	Soviet Union	–	–	o	o	xxx					1.60	
12	Reinelde Knapp	Austria	–	o	o	o	xxx					1.60	
12	Dorothy Tyler	Great Britain	–	o	o	o	xxx					1.60	
14	Carol Bernoth	Australia	–	o	o	xxo	xxx					1.60	
15	Janice Cooper	Australia	–	–	o	xxx						1.55	
16	Audrey Bennett	Great Britain	–	o	o	xxx						1.55	
16	Alice Whitty	Canada	–	o	o	xxx						1.55	
18	Inge Kilian	United Team of Germany	–	o	xxo	xxx						1.55	
