= 1962 European Athletics Championships – Women's high jump =

Women's high jump at the European Athletics Championships

The women's high jump at the 1962 European Athletics Championships was held in Belgrade, then Yugoslavia, at JNA Stadium on 13 and 14 September 1962.

== Medalists ==
Gold	Iolanda Balaș; Romania
Silver	Olga Gere; Yugoslavia
Bronze	Linda Knowles; Great Britain

== Results ==
=== Final ===
14 September

Rank	Name	Nationality	Result	Notes
1st place, gold medalist(s)	Iolanda Balaș	Romania	1.83	CR
2nd place, silver medalist(s)	Olga Gere	Yugoslavia	1.76	NR
3rd place, bronze medalist(s)	Linda Knowles	Great Britain	1.73	
4	Dorothy Shirley	Great Britain	1.67	
5	Doris Walther	East Germany	1.67	
6	Taisiya Chenchik	Soviet Union	1.64	
7	Jarosława Bieda	Poland	1.64	
8	Heidi Hummel	West Germany	1.64	
9	Frances Slaap	Great Britain	1.64	
10	Leena Kaarna	Finland	1.61	
10	Nel Zwier	Netherlands	1.61	
12	Éva Mihályfi	Hungary	1.61	

=== Qualification ===
13 September

Rank	Name	Nationality	Result	Notes
	Iolanda Balaș	Romania	1.67	Q
	Olga Gere	Yugoslavia	1.67	Q
	Taisiya Chenchik	Soviet Union	1.67	Q
	Linda Knowles	Great Britain	1.67	Q
	Dorothy Shirley	Great Britain	1.64	Q
	Leena Kaarna	Finland	1.64	Q
	Jarosława Bieda	Poland	1.64	Q
	Heidi Hummel	West Germany	1.64	Q
	Frances Slaap	Great Britain	1.64	Q
	Doris Walther	East Germany	1.61	Q
	Nel Zwier	Netherlands	1.61	Q
	Éva Mihályfi	Hungary	1.61	Q
	Erika Strössenreuther	West Germany	1.61	
	Canel Konvur	Turkey	1.50	

== Participation ==
According to an unofficial count, 14 athletes from 11 countries participated in the event.

- East Germany (1)
- Finland (1)
- Hungary (1)
- Netherlands (1)
- Poland (1)
- Romania (1)
- Soviet Union (1)
- Turkey (1)
- Great Britain (3)
- West Germany (2)
- Yugoslavia (1)
