= 1958 European Athletics Championships – Women's high jump =

Women's high jump at the European Athletics Championships

The women's high jump at the 1958 European Athletics Championships was held in Stockholm, Sweden, at Stockholms Olympiastadion on 21 August 1958.

== Medalists ==
Gold	Iolanda Balaș; Romania
Silver	Taisiya Chenchik; Soviet Union
Bronze	Dorothy Shirley; Great Britain

== Results ==
=== Final ===
21 August

Rank	Name	Nationality	Result	Notes
1st place, gold medalist(s)	Iolanda Balaș	Romania	1.77	CR
2nd place, silver medalist(s)	Taisiya Chenchik	Soviet Union	1.70	
3rd place, bronze medalist(s)	Dorothy Shirley	Great Britain	1.67	
4	Inge Kilian	West Germany	1.67	
5	Galina Dolya	Soviet Union	1.64	
6	Maj-Lena Lundström	Sweden	1.61	
7	Reinelde Knapp	Austria	1.61	
8	Olga Gere	Yugoslavia	1.61	
9	Inga Söderlind	Sweden	1.61	
10	Anka Abadzhiyeva	Bulgaria	1.58	
11	Margareta Samuelsson	Sweden	1.58	

== Participation ==
According to an unofficial count, 11 athletes from 8 countries participated in the event.

- Austria (1)
- Bulgaria (1)
- Romania (1)
- Soviet Union (2)
- Sweden (3)
- Great Britain (1)
- West Germany (1)
- Yugoslavia (1)
