= 1954 European Athletics Championships – Women's high jump =

Women's high jump at the European Athletics Championships

The women's high jump at the 1954 European Athletics Championships was held in Bern, Switzerland, at Stadion Neufeld on 25 and 28 August 1954.

== Medalists ==
Gold	Thelma Hopkins; Great Britain
Silver	Iolanda Balaș; Romania
Bronze	Olga Modrachová; Czechoslovakia

== Results ==
=== Final ===
28 August

Rank	Name	Nationality	Result	Notes
1st place, gold medalist(s)	Thelma Hopkins	Great Britain	1.67	CR
2nd place, silver medalist(s)	Iolanda Balaș	Romania	1.65	NR
3rd place, bronze medalist(s)	Olga Modrachová	Czechoslovakia	1.63	
4	Gunhild Larking	Sweden	1.63	NR
5	Sheila Lerwill	Great Britain	1.60	
6	Aleksandra Chudina	Soviet Union	1.60	
7	Liduska Ajglova	Czechoslovakia	1.55	
8	Renate Kramer	West Germany	1.55	
9	Ursula Schmückle	West Germany	1.55	
10	Lyudmila Mochilina	Soviet Union	1.55	
10	Reinelde Knapp	Austria	1.55	
12	Simone Peirone	France	1.55	
13	Berta Sablatnig	Austria	1.50	
14	Anka Abadzhiyeva	Bulgaria	1.50	

=== Qualification ===
25 August

Rank	Name	Nationality	Result	Notes
	Sheila Lerwill	Great Britain	1.50	Q
	Anka Abadzhiyeva	Bulgaria	1.50	Q
	Aleksandra Chudina	Soviet Union	1.50	Q
	Reinelde Knapp	Austria	1.50	Q
	Iolanda Balaș	Romania	1.50	Q
	Berta Sablatnig	Austria	1.50	Q
	Gunhild Larking	Sweden	1.50	Q
	Lyudmila Mochilina	Soviet Union	1.50	Q
	Ursula Schmückle	West Germany	1.50	Q
	Olga Modrachová	Czechoslovakia	1.50	Q
	Simone Peirone	France	1.50	Q
	Liduska Ajglova	Czechoslovakia	1.50	Q
	Thelma Hopkins	Great Britain	1.50	Q
	Renate Kramer	West Germany	1.50	Q

== Participation ==
According to an unofficial count, 14 athletes from 9 countries participated in the event.

- Austria (2)
- Bulgaria (1)
- Czechoslovakia (2)
- France (1)
- Romania (1)
- Soviet Union (2)
- Sweden (1)
- Great Britain (2)
- West Germany (2)
