= 1966 European Athletics Championships – Women's high jump =

Women's high jump at the European Athletics Championships

The women's high jump at the 1966 European Athletics Championships was held in Budapest, Hungary, at Népstadion on 3 and 4 September 1966.

== Medalists ==
| Gold | Taisiya Chenchik; Soviet Union |
| Silver | Lyudmila Komleva; Soviet Union |
| Bronze | Jarosława Bieda; Poland |

== Results ==
=== Final ===
4 September

| Rank | Name | Nationality | Result | Notes |
|---|---|---|---|---|
| 1st place, gold medalist(s) | Taisiya Chenchik | Soviet Union | 1.75 | |
| 2nd place, silver medalist(s) | Lyudmila Komleva | Soviet Union | 1.73 | |
| 3rd place, bronze medalist(s) | Jarosława Bieda | Poland | 1.71 | |
| 4 | Mária Faithová | Czechoslovakia | 1.71 | |
| 5 | Olga Pulić | Yugoslavia | 1.71 | |
| 6 | Marjan Thomas | Netherlands | 1.68 | |
| 7 | Dagmar Melzer | East Germany | 1.65 | |
| 8 | Dorothy Shirley | Great Britain | 1.65 | |
| 9 | Radmila Hušková | Czechoslovakia | 1.65 | |
| 9 | Bärbel Graf | East Germany | 1.65 | |
| 11 | Vera Bernardová | Czechoslovakia | 1.65 | |
| 12 | Gabriele Thiele | East Germany | 1.60 | |
| 12 | Geneviève Laureau | France | 1.60 | |
| 14 | Gun Nordlund | Finland | 1.60 | |
| 15 | Ilona Majdan | Austria | 1.60 | |
| 16 | Erika Stoenescu | Romania | 1.60 | |
| 17 | Inger Husted | Denmark | 1.60 | |
| | Valentina Kozyr | Soviet Union | DNS | |

=== Qualification ===
3 September

| Rank | Name | Nationality | Result | Notes |
|---|---|---|---|---|
| | Jarosława Bieda | Poland | 1.65 | Q |
| | Mária Faithová | Czechoslovakia | 1.65 | Q |
| | Dorothy Shirley | Great Britain | 1.65 | Q |
| | Taisiya Chenchik | Soviet Union | 1.65 | Q |
| | Gabriele Thiele | East Germany | 1.65 | Q |
| | Valentina Kozyr | Soviet Union | 1.65 | Q |
| | Marjan Thomas | Netherlands | 1.65 | Q |
| | Olga Pulić | Yugoslavia | 1.65 | Q |
| | Bärbel Graf | East Germany | 1.65 | Q |
| | Lyudmila Komleva | Soviet Union | 1.65 | Q |
| | Dagmar Melzer | East Germany | 1.60 | Q |
| | Gun Nordlund | Finland | 1.60 | Q |
| | Inger Husted | Denmark | 1.60 | Q |
| | Erika Stoenescu | Romania | 1.60 | Q |
| | Radmila Hušková | Czechoslovakia | 1.60 | Q |
| | Ilona Majdan | Austria | 1.60 | Q |
| | Geneviève Laureau | France | 1.60 | Q |
| | Vera Bernardová | Czechoslovakia | 1.60 | Q |
| | Rita Vanherck | Belgium | 1.55 | |
| | Nevenka Mrinjek | Yugoslavia | 1.55 | |
| | Anna Noszály | Hungary | 1.55 | |
| | Solveig Rasmussen | Denmark | 1.55 | |
| | Marjeta Pronjari | Albania | NH | |
| | Sigrún Sæmundsdóttir | Iceland | NH | |

== Participation ==
According to an unofficial count, 24 athletes from 16 countries participated in the event.

- Albania (1)
- Austria (1)
- Belgium (1)
- Czechoslovakia (3)
- Denmark (2)
- East Germany (3)
- Finland (1)
- France (1)
- Hungary (1)
- Iceland (1)
- Netherlands (1)
- Poland (1)
- Romania (1)
- Soviet Union (3)
- Great Britain (1)
- Yugoslavia (2)
