= Ruas =

Ruas is a surname. Notable people with the name include:

- Arturo Ruas (born 1981), Lebanese-born Brazilian professional wrestler, Jiu-Jitsu practitioner, and former amateur wrestler
- Charles Ruas (born 1938), American author, translator, literary and art critic, and interviewer
- Douglas Ruas (born 1989), Brazilian politician
- Hércules Brito Ruas (1939–2026), Brazilian footballer known as Brito
- Marco Ruas (born 1961), Brazilian mixed martial arts fighter, submission wrestler and instructor
- Maria Aparecida Soares Ruas (1948–2025), Brazilian mathematician and university professor
- Simone Ruas (1919–2001), French Olympic high jumper
