= Athletics at the 1957 World University Games – Women's high jump =

The women's high jump event at the 1957 World University Games was held at the Stadium Charlety in Paris on 6 September 1957.

== Results ==
Rank	Name	Nationality	Result	Notes
1st place, gold medalist(s)	Iolanda Balas	Romania	1.66	
2nd place, silver medalist(s)	Valentina Ballod	Soviet Union	1.60	
3rd place, bronze medalist(s)	Jarosława Jóźwiakowska	Poland	1.55	
4	Anka Rouseva	Bulgaria	1.50	
5	Gertrude Fries	Austria	1.50	
6	Luisa Masoero	Italy	1.45	
