= Lorentzon =

Lorentzon is a Swedish surname that may refer to:

- Albin Lorentzon (born 1986), Swedish ice hockey player
- Inga-Britt Lorentzon (1936–1987), Swedish Olympic high jumper
- Martin Lorentzon (born 1969), Swedish businessman
- Susanne Lorentzon (born 1961), Swedish Olympic high jumper, daughter of Inga-Britt
- Tanja Lorentzon (born 1971), Sweden-Finnish actress

== See also ==
- Martin Lorentzson (born 1984), Swedish former footballer
- Yuriy Lorentsson (1930–2002), Russian rowing coxswain
