= Athletics at the 1961 Summer Universiade – Women's high jump =

The women's high jump event at the 1961 Summer Universiade was held at the Vasil Levski National Stadium in Sofia, Bulgaria, in September 1961.

== Medalists ==
| Gold | Silver | Bronze |
|---|---|---|
| Iolanda Balaș; Romania | Klara Pushkaryeva; Soviet Union | Thelma Hopkins; Great Britain |

== Results ==
| Rank | Athlete | Nationality | Result | Notes |
|---|---|---|---|---|
| 1st place, gold medalist(s) | Iolanda Balaș | Romania | 1.85 | |
| 2nd place, silver medalist(s) | Klara Pushkaryeva | Soviet Union | 1.67 | |
| 3rd place, bronze medalist(s) | Thelma Hopkins | Great Britain | 1.65 | |
| 4 | Jarosława Jóźwiakowska | Poland | 1.65 | |
| 5 | Liese Sykora | Austria | 1.59 | |
| 6 | Barbara Schlurmann | West Germany | 1.56 | |
| 7 | Barbara Owczarek | Poland | 1.56 | |
| 8 | Adelinde Weig | West Germany | 1.53 | |
