= Athletics at the 1963 Summer Universiade – Women's high jump =

Sporting event

The women's high jump event at the 1963 Summer Universiade was held at the Estádio Olímpico Monumental in Porto Alegre in September 1963.

== Results ==
Rank	Athlete	Nationality	Result	Notes
1st place, gold medalist(s)	Taisiya Chenchik	Soviet Union	1.72	
2nd place, silver medalist(s)	Susan Dennler	Great Britain	1.67	
3rd place, bronze medalist(s)	Heidi Hummel	West Germany	1.65	
4	Genevieve Laureau	France	1.65	
5	Mitsuko Torii	Japan	1.56	
6	Hilda Fabré	Cuba	1.45	
6	Astrid Hohne	Brazil	1.45	
8	Mercedes Lee	Cuba	1.45	
	Margarida Bitencourt	Brazil	NM	
