= Athletics at the 1959 Summer Universiade – Women's high jump =

The women's high jump event at the 1959 Summer Universiade was held at the Stadio Comunale di Torino in Turin on 6 September 1959.

== Results ==
Rank	Name	Nationality	Result	Notes
1st place, gold medalist(s)	Iolanda Balaș	Romania	1.80	
2nd place, silver medalist(s)	Valentina Ballod	Soviet Union	1.73	
3rd place, bronze medalist(s)	Jarosława Jóźwiakowska	Poland	1.61	
4	Justa Holtz	West Germany	1.45	
4	Maria Ciastowska	Poland	1.45	
6	Amalia Liechtenstein	Israel	1.45	
7	Beate Rosenthal	West Germany	1.40	
