= 1954 European Athletics Championships – Women's pentathlon =

Women's pentathlon at the European Athletics Championships

The women's pentathlon at the 1954 European Athletics Championships was held in Bern, Switzerland, at Stadion Neufeld on 27 August 1954.

== Medalists ==
Gold	Aleksandra Chudina; Soviet Union
Silver	Maria Sander; West Germany
Bronze	Maria Sturm; West Germany

== Results ==
=== Final ===
27 August

The highest mark recorded in each event is highlighted in yellow

Rank	Name	Nationality	SP	HJ	200m	80m H	LJ	Points	Notes
1st place, gold medalist(s)	Aleksandra Chudina	Soviet Union	13.21	1.58	25.9	12.0	5.73	3754 (4526)	CR
2nd place, silver medalist(s)	Maria Sander	West Germany	12.09	1.44	25.1	11.2	5.71	3726 (4485)	
3rd place, bronze medalist(s)	Maria Sturm	West Germany	11.88	1.54	26.2	11.9	5.61	3574 (4357)	
4	Lena Stumpf	West Germany	12.48	1.44	25.9	12.2	5.91	3571 (4336)	
5	Sofiya Burdulenko	Soviet Union	12.48	1.47	26.2	11.6	5.20	3468 (4265)	
6	Maria Piątkowska	Poland	11.14	1.41	25.8	11.8	5.73	3469 (4233)	
7	Nina Vinogradova	Soviet Union	11.26	1.47	25.9	11.9	5.44	3432 (4220)	
8	Marthe Lambert	France	10.81	1.50	26.4	11.9	5.53	3419 (4203)	
9	Olga Modrachová	Czechoslovakia	10.52	1.60	26.4	12.2	5.28	3395 (4189)	
10	Mira Tuce	Yugoslavia	11.08	1.50	26.0	12.4	5.49	3380 (4176)	
11	Arlette Ben Hamo	France	10.70	1.47	26.5	11.9	5.33	3312 (4106)	
12	Trude Wareka	Austria	9.49	1.44	26.6	12.1	5.52	3214 (3992)	
13	Alena Holarkova	Czechoslovakia	10.00	1.56	26.9	12.1	4.91	3185 (3991)	
14	Gretel Bolliger	Switzerland	11.39	1.41	26.9	12.2	5.13	3155 (3963)	
15	Jorun Tangen	Norway	10.34	1.41	26.3	12.2	5.10	3129 (3928)	
16	Stina Cronholm	Sweden	9.83	1.47	26.7	12.3	5.08	3105 (3928)	
17	Fani Argiriou	Greece	11.19	1.41	28.5	12.8	5.23	2957 (3776)	
18	Alice Bernard	Switzerland	9.41	1.30	26.7	13.1	4.79	2709 (3498)	
	Alda Rossi	Italy	11.03	1.44				DNF	

== Participation ==
According to an unofficial count, 19 athletes from 12 countries participated in the event.

- Austria (1)
- Czechoslovakia (2)
- France (2)
- Greece (1)
- Italy (1)
- Norway (1)
- Poland (1)
- Soviet Union (3)
- Sweden (1)
- Switzerland (2)
- West Germany (3)
- Yugoslavia (1)
