= Athletics at the 1964 Summer Olympics – Women's high jump =

Women's high jump at the Games of the XVIII Olympiad
- Venue: Olympic Stadium
- Date: 15 October
- Competitors: 27 from 18 nations
- Winning height: 1.90 OR

Medalists
1st place, gold medalist(s)		Iolanda Balaș; Romania
2nd place, silver medalist(s)		Michele Brown; Australia
3rd place, bronze medalist(s)		Taisia Chenchik; Soviet Union

The women's high jump was one of two women's jumping events on the Athletics at the 1964 Summer Olympics program in Tokyo. Both qualification and the final were held on 15 October 1964. 27 athletes from 18 nations entered, with 1 not starting in the qualification round.

== Results ==
=== Qualification ===
Jumpers had to clear 1.70 metres to qualify for the final or be in the top 12 (with all those tying for a place in the top 12 qualifying). Since only 11 jumpers cleared 1.70 metres, all those clearing 1.68 advanced. The bar started at 1.55 metres, increasing gradually to 1.70 metres. Each jumper had three attempts at each height or could skip any lower height (but could not return to a lower height if he determined that he could not succeed).

Place	Athlete	Nation	Best mark	1.55	1.60	1.65	1.68	1.70
1	Iolanda Balaș	Romania	1.70 metres			1st		1st
1	Michele Brown	Australia	1.70 metres			1st		1st
1	Dianne Gerace	Canada	1.70 metres			1st		1st
4	Frances Slaap	Great Britain	1.70 metres		1st	1st		1st
5	Jarosława Bieda	Poland	1.70 metres		1st	1st	1st	1st
5	Aída dos Santos	Brazil	1.70 metres		1st	1st	1st	1st
7	Robyn Woodhouse	Australia	1.70 metres	1st	1st	1st	1st	1st
8	Olga Pulic	Yugoslavia	1.70 metres		2nd	2nd	1st	1st
9	Eleanor Montgomery	United States	1.70 metres			1st	3rd	1st
10	Taisia Chenchik	Soviet Union	1.70 metres		1st	1st	1st	2nd
11	Gerda Kupferschmied	United Team of Germany	1.70 metres	1st	1st	2nd	2nd	2nd
12	Terri Brown	United States	1.68 metres			1st	2nd	Fail
13	Ulla Flegel	Austria	1.68 metres	2nd	1st	3rd	2nd	Fail
14	Leena Kaarna	Finland	1.68 metres	1st	1st	2nd	3rd	Fail
15	Karin Rüger	United Team of Germany	1.68 metres	1st	1st	2nd	1st	Fail
16	Galina Kostenko	Soviet Union	1.65 metres	1st	1st	1st	Fail	
16	Gwenda Matthews	Great Britain	1.65 metres	1st	1st	1st	Fail	
18	Amelia Okoli	Nigeria	1.65 metres		2nd	1st	Fail	
19	Estelle Baskerville	United States	1.65 metres	1st	1st	2nd	Fail	
19	Michel Lamdani	Israel	1.65 metres	1st	1st	2nd	Fail	
21	Liese Sykora	Austria	1.65 metres	2nd	3rd	3rd	Fail	
22	Linda Knowles	Great Britain	1.60 metres	1st	1st	Fail		
23	Mitsuko Torii	Japan	1.60 metres	1st	2nd	Fail		
24	Lolita Lagrosas	Philippines	1.55 metres	1st	Fail			
25	Nazli Bayat Makou	Iran	No mark	Fail				
25	Tipapan Leenasen	Thailand	No mark	Fail				
—	Doris Langer	United Team of Germany	Did not start					

=== Final ===
Each jumper again had three attempts at each height.

Place	Athlete	Nation	Best mark	1.55	1.60	1.65	1.68	1.71	1.74	1.76	1.78	1.80	1.82	1.86	1.90	1.92
1	Iolanda Balaş	Romania	1.90 metres OR	–	–	o	–	o	–	o	o	o	o	o	o	xxx
2	Michele Brown	Australia	1.80 metres	–	–	o	–	o	–	o	xo	xo	xxx			
3	Taisia Chenchik	Soviet Union	1.78 metres	–	–	o	o	xo	o	xxo	o	xxx				
4	Aida dos Santos	Brazil	1.74 metres	–	o	o	o	o	o	xxx						
5	Dianne Gerace	Canada	1.71 metres	–	–	o	–	o	xxx							
6	Frances Slaap	Great Britain	1.71 metres	–	–	o	o	o	xxx							
7	Olga Pulic	Yugoslavia	1.71 metres	–	o	o	o	o	xxx							
8	Eleanor Montgomery	United States	1.71 metres	–	–	xo	xo	o	xxx							
9	Karin Rüger	United Team of Germany	1.71 metres	–	o	xo	xo	xo	xxx							
10	Jarosława Bieda	Poland	1.71 metres	–	o	o	xo	xxo	xxx							
11	Robyn Woodhouse	Australia	1.71 metres	o	o	o	xo	xxo	xxx							
12	Gerda Kupferschmied	United Team of Germany	1.68 metres	–	o	o	o	xxx								
13	Leena Kaarna	Finland	1.65 metres	o	xo	xo	–	xxx								
14	Terrezene Brown	United States	No mark	–	–	xxx										
14	Ulla Flegel	Austria	No mark	–	–	xxx										
