= David Wiener =

American artist and serial entrepreneur (born 1958)

David M. Wiener
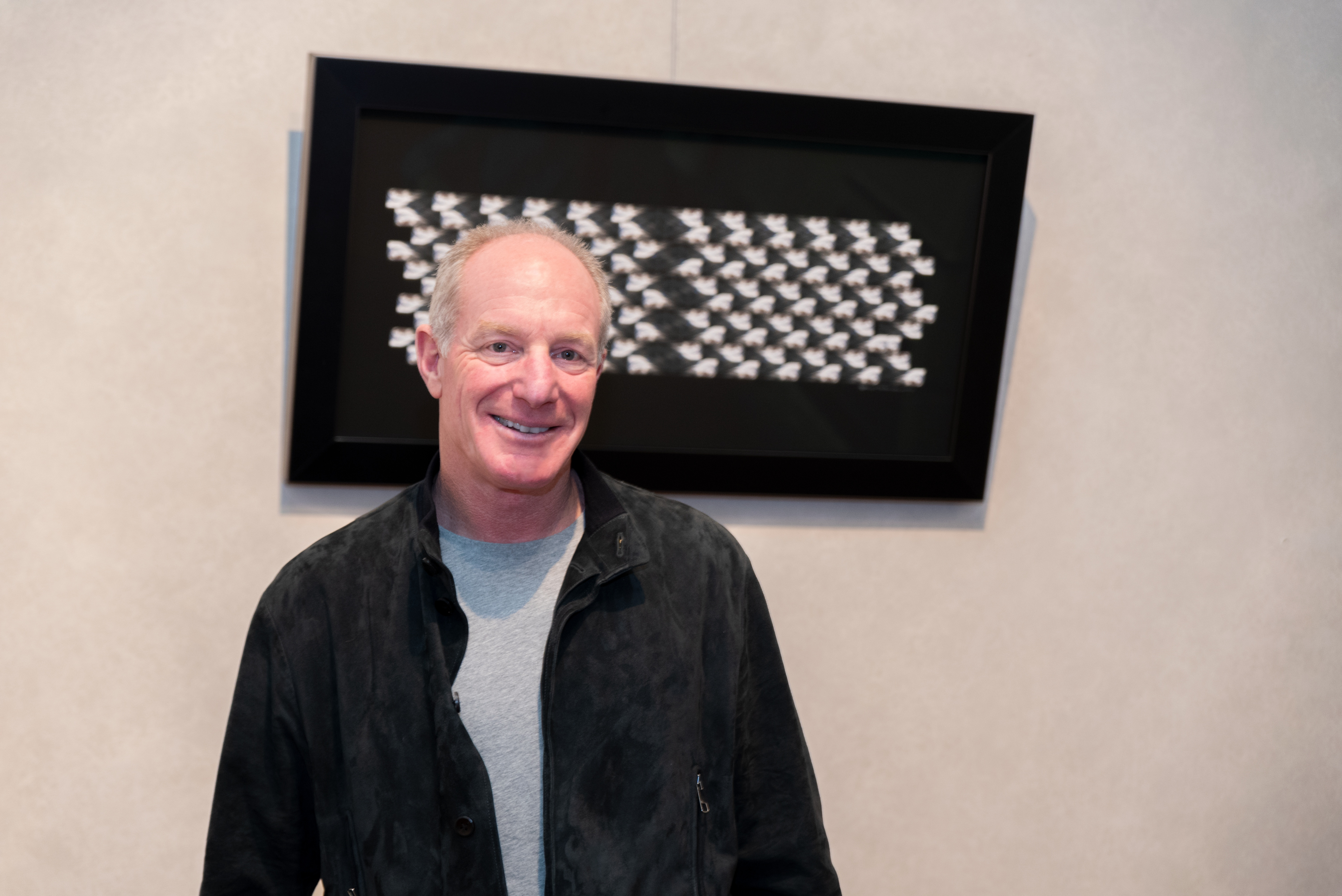
- The artist and serial entrepreneur David Wiener
- Born: January 1958; New York City, United States
- Known for: Digital Art, Design, NFT

David Michel Wiener (born January 1958 in New York City) is an American artist and serial entrepreneur.

== Biography ==
David Michel Wiener is an American artist and serial entrepreneur. His father, Sam Wiener, is also an artist, and his grandfather Samuel G. Wiener was an architect featured in the documentary “Unexpected Modernism” and an artist (painter). David worked as an apprentice to George Silk to become one of the youngest professional photographers shooting Formula One, Indianapolis 500, America's Cup, and US Open Events during his teenage years. David was represented at that time by Focus On Sports, A New York City-based agency. Before graduating from Hampshire College, he was the subject of a PBS documentary, “Human Power”, featuring the vehicles he designed and built for the Human Power World Speed Championship in 1981. When he was at college, he invented a low-slung three-wheel bicycle that could go 60 miles an hour. For David, art represents many things such as aesthetics, self-expression, and something to share. His creative and entrepreneurial work has crossed diverse industries such as fashion for sportswear, avant-garde furniture, audio, encryption technology, aircraft, custom Porsches, manufacturing and designing audio speakers, founding SoundTube Entertainment and also for important brands such as Ferrari. In recent years, David has turned his creative attention to produce artwork. He channeled his photography as the source medium to create modern abstract pieces with specific subject matter that brings the detail of life into critical focus.

== Exhibitions ==
- Departure Car, Winfield Gallery, Carmel, California - 2024
- Open Art Code Real Círculo Artístico, Barcelona, Spain – 2024
- Public Outdoor Sculpture, GRAND PRIX, Canyons Resort & Pendry Hotel Park City, Utah – 2022
- OpenArtCode Salone di Donatello, San Lorenzo church, Florence, Italy -2018
- GemlucArt – Monaco, Monte Carlo - 2017
- AJAC exhibition, Tokyo Metropolitan Art Museum, Japan - 2017
- Art for Water, Waterkeeper Alliance, Sotheby’s New York City – 2017
- Photo Constructs, ARTIFACT Gallery, New York City – 2016
- Art.Engine, Ferrari SpA, Maranello, Italy - 2009
