= Audrey Bennett =

British athlete

Personal information
- Nationality: British (English)
- Born: 1 April 1936 (age 90) Essex
- Height: 165 cm (5 ft 5 in)
- Weight: 60 kg (132 lb)

Sport
- Sport: Athletics
- Event: High jump
- Club: Essex Ladies A.C. Chingford A.C

Audrey Ethel Bennett, married name Banfield (born 1 April 1936) is a former British athlete who competed at the 1956 Summer Olympics.

== Biography ==
Bennett emigrated to Australia in late 1953 but returned to re-join the Essex Ladies Athletics Club for the 1955 season.

Bennett finished third behind Thelma Hopkins in the high jump event at the 1955 WAAA Championships.

Bennett competed in the women's high jump competition at the 1956 Olympic Games.

Bennett finished second behind Mary Bignal in the high jump event at the 1958 WAAA Championships. Shortly afterwards she represented England in the high jump at the 1958 British Empire and Commonwealth Games in Cardiff, Wales. She finished in sixth place with a distance of 5'4 (1.62 m) feet.
