= Jönköpings AIF =

Defunct Swedish Sports club

- Full name: Jönköpings Allmänna Idrottsförening
- Short name: Jönköpings AIF
- Founded: 30 January 1901; 124 years ago
- Ground: Jönköping

Jönköpings AIF was a Swedish sports club in Jönköping active in football and athletics.

== History ==
=== First Jönköpings AIF ===
A first Jönköpings AIF was founded 30 January 1901 and had, by the end of its first year, 132 members. Together with the city, the club created the first stadium in Jönköping – Stadsparksvallen on Dunkehalla. In its first year, Lennart Rosengren, won the national athletics championship titles in high jump and grenhopp for the club.

On 30–31 August 1902, Jönköpings AIF organised the 3rd Svenska Gymnastik- och Idrottsförbundets mästerskapstävlingar, which included the 7th Swedish Athletics Championships, the Swedish Football Championship, and the Dicksonpokalen one mile race. In the Swedish Football Championship final, the football team lost to Örgryte IS. Örgryte, who were considered to have practiced more according to Smålands Allehanda, made an early goal and then continued and won by 8–0 in the end.

In 1902, the club took the initiative to found Smålands Idrottsförbund, the first Swedish district sports association.

=== Jönköpings IS ===
The club then merged with Jönköpings AIK in 1910 to form Jönköpings IS. Jönköpings IS played football in the 1916–17 second-tier Västsvenska serien against IF Elfsborg, GAIS, IS Halmia, IFK Halmstad, Surte IS, IFK Uddevalla, and IK Wega. They also played in the 1920–21 second-tier Sydsvenska serien against IS Halmia, IFK Helsingborg, Husqvarna IF, Landskrona BoIS, and Malmö FF.

=== Second Jönköpings AIF ===
Jönköpings IS merged in 1930 with another Jönköpings AIK to become Jönköpings AIF again. From 1952 to 1956, Gunhild Larking won five national championship titles in high jump for the club. Larking also competed in the 1952 and 1956 Summer Olympics while at the club. Larking finished fourth in the 1956 high jump event.

In December 1995, the club took up floorball. In 2001, IK Hakarpspojkarna took over the athletics department.
