= Canel =

== Given name ==
- Canel Konvur (1939–2018), Turkish high jumper

== Surname ==
- Atılay Canel (born 1955), Turkish football coach
- Buck Canel (1906–1980), American Spanish language Major League Baseball broadcaster
- Eva Canel (1857–1932), Spanish journalist and writer
- Miguel Díaz-Canel (born 1960), Cuban politician

== See also ==
- Canel's
