= Jean Card =

English high jumper

Jean Card née Pearce
Personal information
- Nationality: British (English)
- Born: 1 April 1936 (age 89)

Sport
- Sport: Athletics
- Event: high jump
- Club: Croydon Harriers

Jean R. Card née Pearce (born 1 April 1936) is a female former athlete who competed for England.

== Biography ==
Pearce finished third behind Dorothy Tyler in the high jump event at the 1956 WAAA Championships.

Pearce married Terence Card in late 1957 and competed under her married name thereafter.

Card represented England in the high jump at the 1958 British Empire and Commonwealth Games in Cardiff, Wales.

Card finished third again in the high jump event at the 1959 WAAA Championships, this time behind Dutchwoman Nel Zwier.
