= Athletics at the 1963 Summer Universiade – Women's 80 metres hurdles =

The women's 80 metres hurdles event at the 1963 Summer Universiade was held at the Estádio Olímpico Monumental in Porto Alegre in September 1963.

== Results ==
Rank	Athlete	Nationality	Time	Notes
1st place, gold medalist(s)	Jutta Heine	West Germany	10.95	
2nd place, silver medalist(s)	Tatyana Shchelkanova	Soviet Union	11.01	
3rd place, bronze medalist(s)	Alla Chernysheva	Soviet Union	11.1	
4	Mitsuko Torii	Japan	12.5	
5	Astrid Hohne	Brazil	12.5	
6	Neusa Gonçalves	Brazil	13.1	
