= Arlette Ben Hamo =

French former track and field athlete

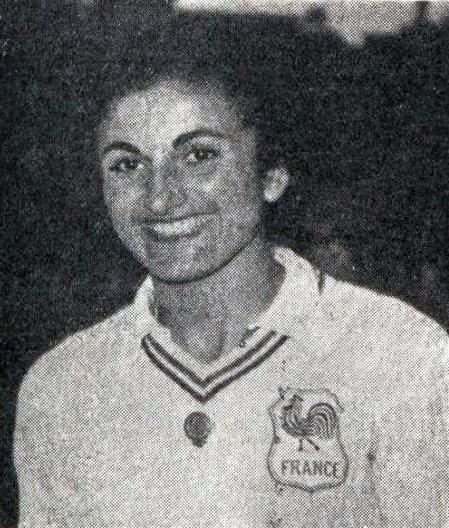
- Arlette Ben Hamo in 1950

Personal information
- Born: 22 March 1930 (age 96) Saint-Martin-de-May, France
- Height: 167 cm (5 ft 6 in)
- Weight: 60 kg (132 lb)
Medal record
Women's athletics
Representing France
European Championships
Gold medal – first place	1950 Brussels	Pentathlon

Arlette Ben Hamo (born 22 March 1930) is a French former track and field athlete who competed in the women's pentathlon.

Born in Saint-Martin-de-Fontenay, she became the first ever European women's combined events champion when she won the pentathlon at the 1950 European Athletics Championships in Brussels. She won by a margin of more than 150 points ahead of Britain's Bertha Crowther and Olga Modrachová of Czechoslovakia. In spite of winning this high honour, she was ranked only twelfth globally for the event – the highest ranked athletes, Fanny Blankers-Koen, Aleksandra Chudina and Micheline Ostermeyer instead focused on competing in multiple individual events.

Ben Hamo returned to attempt a defence of her title at the 1954 European Athletics Championships, but the standard of competition had risen following the introduction of the championship event and her improved score of 4106 points left her in eleventh place, well behind the winner Chudina and also her national rival Marthe Lambert.

She remained France's only combined events champion until 2012, when Antoinette Nana Djimou won the heptathlon. An indoor track and field stadium in Caen was named in Ben Hamo's honour as the Halle Arlette Ben Hamo.

== International competitions ==
Year	Competition	Venue	Position	Event	Notes
1950	European Championships	Brussels, Belgium	1st	Pentathlon	3204 pts CR
1954	European Championships	Bern, Switzerland	11th	Pentathlon	4106 pts

== See also ==
- List of European Athletics Championships medalists (women)
