= Thelma Hopkins =

Thelma Hopkins may refer to:

- Telma Hopkins (born 1948), American actress
- Thelma Hopkins (athlete) (1936–2025), Northern Irish athlete
