= 1959 WAAA Championships =

British athletics event

- Dates: 4 July
- Host city: London
- Venue: Motspur Park
- Level: Senior
- Type: Outdoor

The 1959 WAAA Championships were the national track and field championships for women in the United Kingdom.

The event was held at Motspur Park, London, on 4 July 1959.

== Results ==
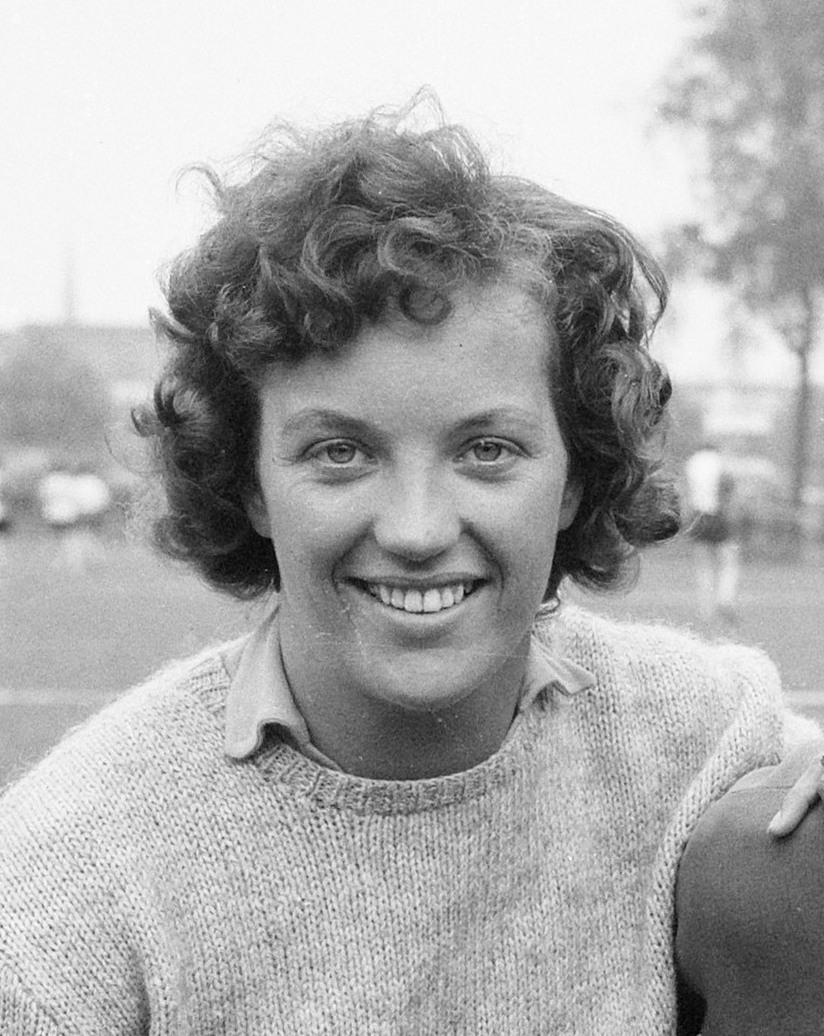
Nel Swier was one of several Dutch athletes to compete in the 1959 Championships

Event	Gold		Silver		Bronze	
100 yards	Dorothy Hyman	10.8	(Netherlands) Joke Bijleveld	10.8	Madeleine Weston	11.0
220 yards	Dorothy Hyman	24.5	Marianne Dew	25.1	(Republic of Ireland) Maeve Kyle	25.3
440 yards	Margaret Pickerill	55.9	(Netherlands) Ine ter Laak-Spijk	56.5	Ann Sissons	56.8
880 yards	Joy Jordan	2:09.5	Phyllis Perkins	2:10.8	Betty Loakes	2:11.6
1 mile	Joan Briggs	5:02.2	Anne Oliver	5:07.4	Elizabeth Brade-Birks	5:07.4
80 metres hurdles	Mary Bignal	11.3	Carole Quinton	11.3	Pat Nutting	11.3
High jump	(Netherlands) Nel Zwier	1.651	Mary Bignal	1.626	Jean Card	1.626
Long jump	Mary Bignal	6.04	Marion Needham	6.02	(Netherlands) Wemmy Scholtmeyer	5.92
Shot put	Suzanne Allday	13.80	(Netherlands) Diny Hobers	13.49	Maureen Costard	12.07
Discus throw	Suzanne Allday	45.21	Brenda Hampton	42.18	Sylvia Needham	39.74
Javelin	Sue Platt	49.04	Averil Williams	48.02	Mary Tadd	42.37
Pentathlon +	Mary Bignal	4679 NR	Jean Adamson	4092	Janet Gaunt	4027
1½ mile walk	Betty Franklin	12:56.4	Joyce Heath	13:03.6	Nellie Loines	13:15.0

+ Held on 8 August at Wolverhampton

== See also ==
- 1959 AAA Championships
