= Ine ter Laak-Spijk =

Dutch runner

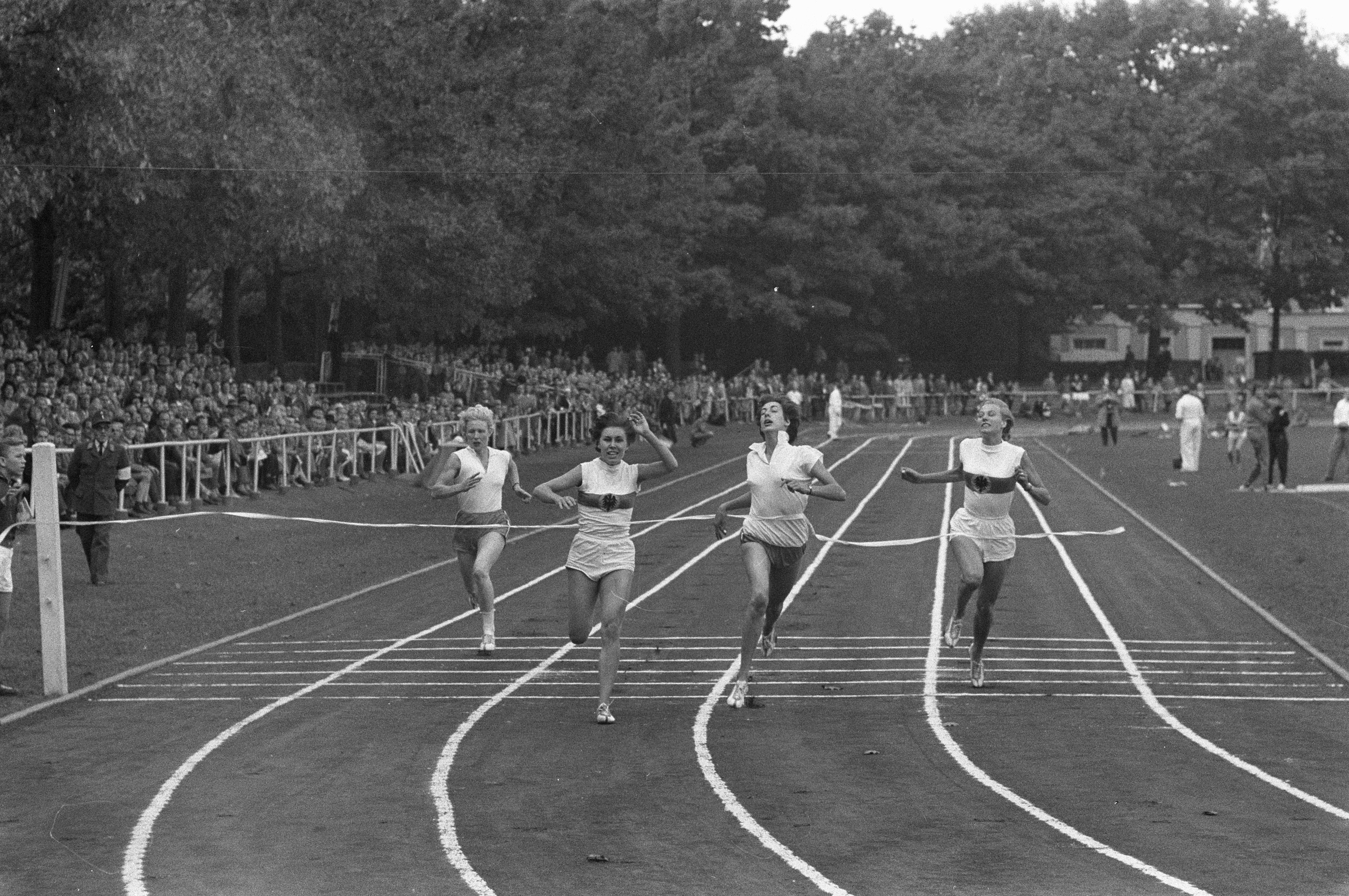
- Ter Laak (left) running 100 m in 1959

Personal information
- Nationality: Dutch
- Born: 2 January 1931 Enschede, Netherlands
- Died: 29 September 2002 (aged 71) Enschede, Netherlands
- Height: 1.66 m (5 ft 5 in)
- Weight: 60 kg (130 lb)

Sport
- Sport: Athletics
- Events: Sprints, middle distance
- Club: RKEAV, Enschede

Gesina Geertruida Hermina "Ine" ter Laak-Spijk (2 January 1931 – 29 September 2002) was a Dutch short and middle-distance runner who competed at the 1960 Summer Olympics.

== Biography ==
Laak-Spijk finished second behind Margaret Pickerill in the 440 yards event at the British 1959 WAAA Championships.

Laak-Spijk represented the Netherlands at the 1960 Olympic Games in Rome, competing in the 800 m event, but failed to reach the final.
