= Janice Cooper (athlete) =

Australian high jumper

Personal information
- Nationality: Australian
- Born: 17 February 1940
- Died: 28 February 2002 (aged 62)

Sport
- Sport: Athletics
- Event: High jump

Janice Cooper (17 February 1940 – 28 February 2002) was an Australian athlete. She competed in the women's high jump at the 1956 Summer Olympics.
