= Mona-Lisa Englund =

Swedish athlete

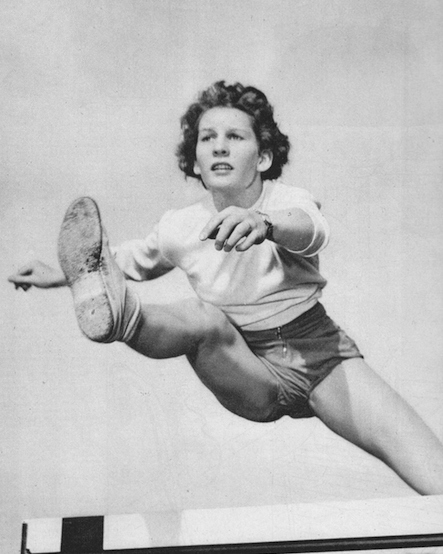

Personal information
- Born: 3 February 1933 Fuxerna, Sweden
- Died: 2 September 1999 (aged 66) Täby, Sweden

Sport
- Country: Sweden
- Sport: Athletics, figure skating, handball, badminton
- Club: Kvinnliga IK Sport

Mona-Lisa Englund (later Crispin, 3 February 1933 – 2 September 1999) was a Swedish athlete, who competed in track and field athletics, figure skating, handball and badminton among other sports. Her best achievement was fourth place in the pentathlon at the 1950 European Championships.

== Athletics ==
Englund finished fourth in the pentathlon at the 1950 European Championships. She won national titles in the 80 m hurdles (1949–51), high jump (1950), triathlon (1949–50) and pentathlon (1951) and held national records in triathlon and pentathlon.

== Figure skating ==
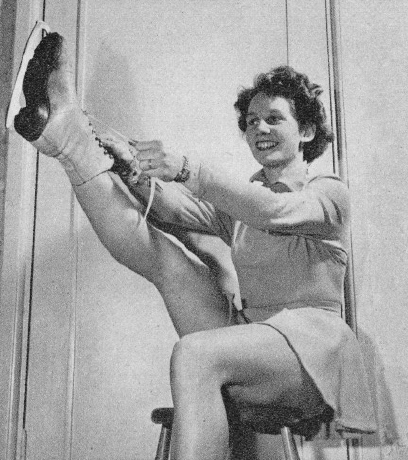
Mona-Lisa Englund

In 1951 Englund won a junior national title in pair skating. Later, competing with Ronny Hall in senior pairs, she placed second at the 1956 Nordic Figure Skating Championships and at the 1956 Swedish Figure Skating Championships; she finished third in 1955.

== Handball ==
Between 1949 and 1956 Englund won three Nordic Championships and eight national titles with Kvinnliga IK Sport. She played 16 international matches for Sweden.

== Badminton ==
In 1951 Englund won junior national badminton titles in singles and doubles.

== Personal life ==
In 1960, she married Carl Anders Henry Crispin (1928–2008), changed her last name and retired from competitions. She had a daughter (born 1960) and a son (1962–1997). In 1969–1977 she wrote a few books about figure skating.

== Publications ==
- Mona-Lisa Englund-Crispin (1969). Konståkning. Wahlström & Widstrand. – translated into Danish and Finnish
- Mona-Lisa Englund-Crispin (1977). Lär dig mer om konståkning. Svenska konståkningsförbundet. ISBN 978-91-568-0045-0.
- Mona-Lisa Englund-Crispin (1977). Konståkning för alla. Svenska Konståkningsförbundet. ISBN 9789156800979.
