= Maj-Lena Lundström =

Swedish athletics competitor

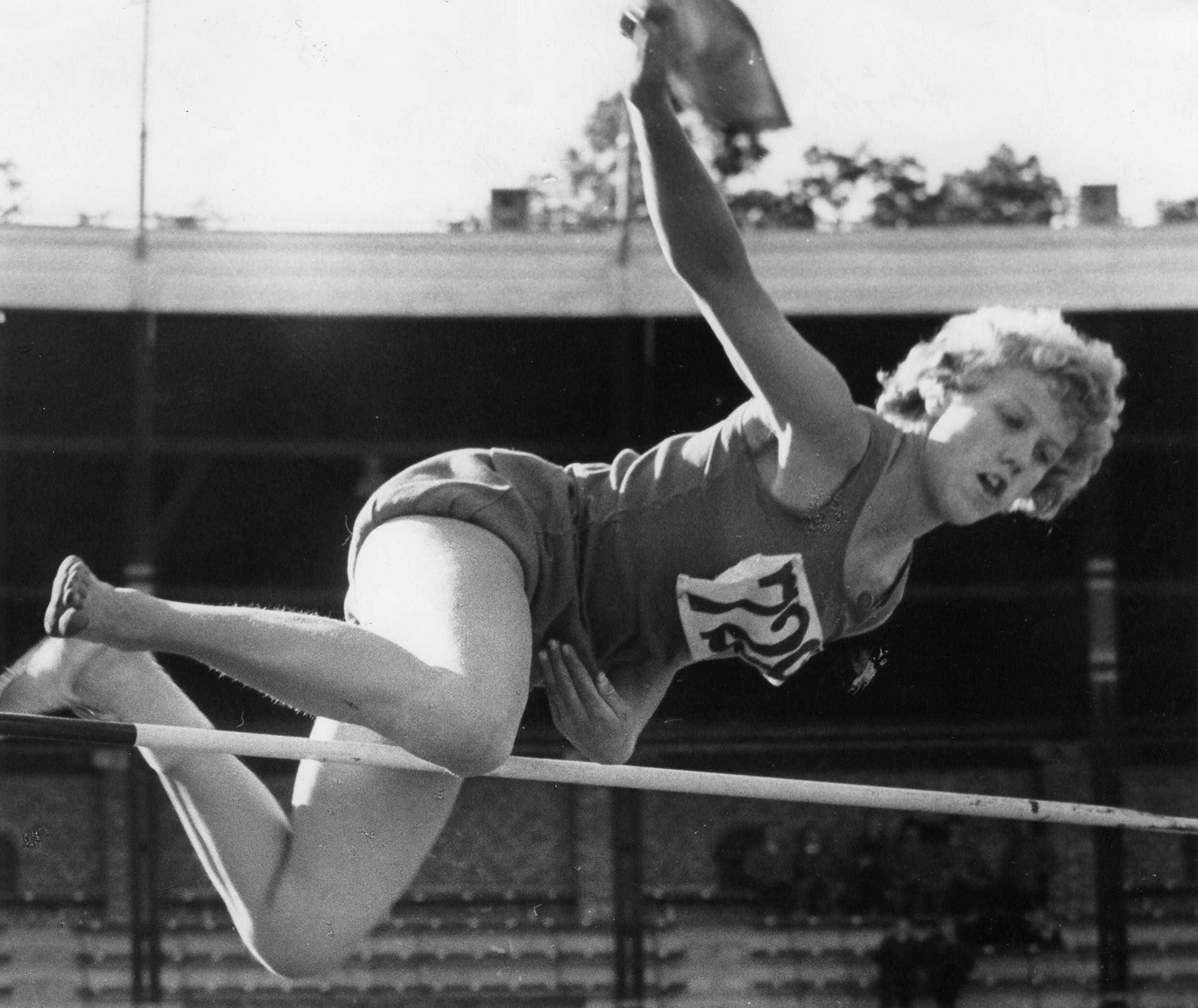

Personal information
- Born: 29 December 1941 (age 84)

Sport
- Sport: Athletics
- Event(s): High jump, long jump, sprint, pentathlon
- Club: IFK Norrköping

Achievements and titles
- Personal best(s): HJ – 1.66 m (1959); LJ – 5.69 m 80 mH – 11.5; Pentathlon – 4169

Maj-Lena Lundström (born 29 December 1941) is a retired Swedish athlete. She won the national titles in high jump (1958), 80 m hurdles (1959 and 1962), 100 m (1962), pentathlon (1959) and 4 × 200 m relay (1961). She placed sixth in the high jump, her strongest event, at the 1958 European Championships in Stockholm.
