= 1902 Svenska Mästerskapet =

Tournament details
- Country: Sweden
- Teams: 2

Final positions
- Champions: Örgryte
- Runners-up: Jönköpings AIF

The 1902 Svenska Mästerskapet was the seventh season of Svenska Mästerskapet, the football Cup to determine the Swedish champions. Örgryte IS won the tournament by defeating Jönköpings AIF in the final with an 8–0 score.

== Final ==
30 August 1902

Jönköpings AIF	0–8	Örgryte IS

Vallområdet, Jönköping
Referee: Isaac Westergren, Gävle
