= Galina Kostenko =

Soviet high jumper (1938–2021)

Personal information
- Nationality: Soviet
- Born: 8 October 1938
- Died: 3 July 2021 (aged 82)

Sport
- Sport: Athletics
- Event: High jump

Galina Kostenko (8 October 1938 – 3 July 2021) was a Soviet athlete. She competed in the women's high jump at the 1964 Summer Olympics.
