= Inge Kilian =

German high jumper (born 1935)

Personal information
- Born: 3 June 1935 (age 91) Geisenheim, Germany
- Height: 1.70 m (5 ft 7 in)
- Weight: 60 kg (130 lb)

Sport
- Country: West Germany
- Sport: Athletics
- Event: High jump
- Club: Eintracht Braunschweig

Achievements and titles
- Personal best: 1.68 (1958)

Inge Offermann (née Kilian, born 3 June 1935) is a retired German high jumper, who competed in the 1956 Summer Olympics.

Born in Geisenheim, Kilian moved to Braunschweig as a child, where she took up athletics at the age of 12. She competed for the sports club Eintracht Braunschweig. Kilian won national championships in 1955, 1956, 1957 and 1958, as well as West German indoor titles in 1956 and 1959. She set German records in 1956 (three times) and 1958.

Kilian represented the United Team of Germany at the 1956 Summer Olympics in Melbourne, where she placed 18th. She also placed 4th at the 1958 European Athletics Championships in Stockholm.

== Competition record ==
Year	Competition	Venue	Position	Event	Notes
Representing Germany
1956	Summer Olympics	Melbourne, Australia	18th	High jump	1.55
Representing West Germany
1958	European Athletics Championships	Stockholm, Sweden	4th	High jump	1.67
