= Nazli Bayat Makoo =

Iranian high jumper

Personal information
- Nationality: Iranian
- Born: 16 September 1945
- Died: 2018 United Kingdom

Sport
- Sport: Athletics
- Event: High jump

Nazli Bayat Makoo (Persian: نازلی بیات ماکو; born 16 September 1945) was an Iranian athlete. She competed in the women's high jump at the 1964 Summer Olympics.
