= Doris Langer =

German competitive high jumper

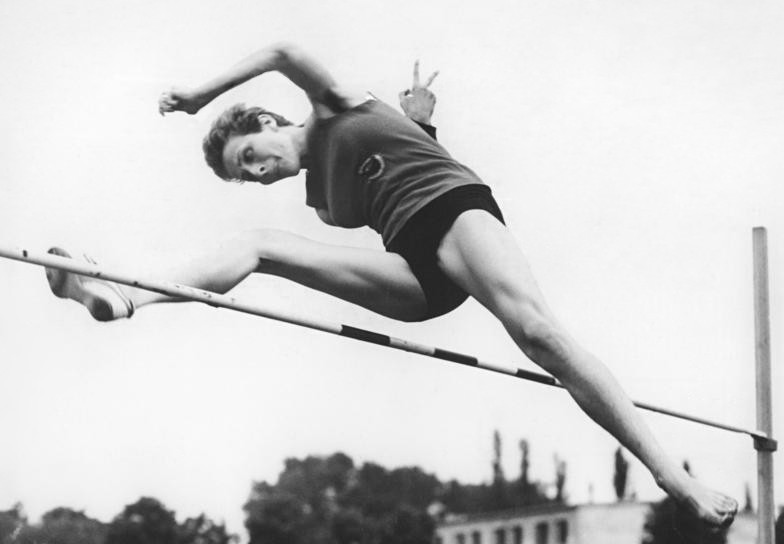
Doris Langer, 1962

Doris Langer, née Walther (born 29 September 1938 in Weißenfels) is a retired East German high jumper.

She finished fifth at the 1962 Athletics Championships and was entered for the 1964 Olympic Games, but did not start.

She became East German champion in 1960, 1962, and 1963, won silver in 1964 and 1965 and bronze in 1966. She competed for the sports club SC Lok Leipzig/SC Leipzig during her active career.
