= Mette Oxvang =

Danish high jumper

Personal information
- Nationality: Danish
- Born: 2 December 1937 Copenhagen, Denmark
- Died: 19 September 2010 (aged 72)

Sport
- Sport: Athletics
- Event: High jump

Mette Oxvang (2 December 1937 – 19 September 2010) was a Danish athlete. She competed in the women's high jump at the 1960 Summer Olympics.
