= Carol Bernoth =

Australian high jumper (born 1938)

Personal information
- Full name: Carol Estelle Bernoth
- Nationality: Australian
- Born: 11 May 1938 (age 88) Coolangatta, Queensland

Sport
- Sport: Athletics
- Event: High jump

Achievements and titles
- Olympic finals: 1956 Summer Olympics

Carol Estelle Bernoth (born 11 May 1938) is a retired Australian athlete. She competed in the women's high jump at the 1956 Summer Olympics.
