= Karin Lenzke =

German high jumper

Personal information
- Nationality: German
- Born: 27 July 1936 (age 89)

Sport
- Sport: Athletics
- Event: High jump

Karin Lenzke (born 27 July 1936) is a German athlete. She competed in the women's high jump at the 1960 Summer Olympics.
