= Hermina Geyser =

South African high jumper

Personal information
- Nationality: South African
- Born: 4 February 1938 (age 88) Pietermaritzburg, South Africa

Sport
- Sport: Athletics
- Event: High jump

Hermina Geyser (born 4 February 1938) is a South African athlete. She competed in the women's high jump at the 1956 Summer Olympics.
