= 1950 European Athletics Championships – Women's pentathlon =

Women's pentathlon at the European Athletics Championships

The women's pentathlon at the 1950 European Athletics Championships was held in Brussels, Belgium, at Heysel Stadium on 25 August 1950.

== Medalists ==
Gold	Arlette Ben Hamo; France
Silver	Bertha Crowther; Great Britain
Bronze	Olga Modrachová; Czechoslovakia

== Results ==
=== Final ===
25 August

The highest mark recorded in each event is highlighted in yellow

Rank	Name	Nationality	SP	HJ	200m	80m H	LJ	Points	Notes
1st place, gold medalist(s)	Arlette Ben Hamo	France	10.11	1.50	26.1	12.4	5.18	3221 (3204)	CR
2nd place, silver medalist(s)	Bertha Crowther	Great Britain	8.66	1.56	27.1	12.5	5.15	3087 (3048)	
3rd place, bronze medalist(s)	Olga Modrachová	Czechoslovakia	10.40	1.53	27.0	12.9	4.96	3066 (3026)	
4	Mona-Lisa Englund	Sweden	10.26	1.45	27.0	12.6	5.03	3028 (2936)	
5	Marguerite Martel	France	9.66	1.45	28.0	12.4	5.32	3019 (2918)	
6	Unni Sæther	Norway	9.90	1.45	26.8	13.2	5.23	2996 (2870)	
7	Klavdiya Tochenova	Soviet Union	13.82	1.40	28.1	14.0	4.67	2850 (2818)	
8	Ivanka Knez	Yugoslavia	9.74	1.50	28.3	13.0	5.04	2894 (2778)	
9	Gretel Bolliger	Switzerland	11.23	1.40	28.1	13.6	4.68	2726 (2501)	
10	Kirsti Jordet	Norway	10.75	1.45	28.4	13.7	4.64	2704 (2489)	
11	Fani Argiriou	Greece	9.79	1.35	30.1	14.5	4.56	2304 (1862)	

== Participation ==
According to an unofficial count, 11 athletes from 9 countries participated in the event.

- Czechoslovakia (1)
- France (2)
- Greece (1)
- Norway (2)
- Soviet Union (1)
- Sweden (1)
- Switzerland (1)
- Great Britain (1)
- Yugoslavia (1)
