= Barbara Brown (athlete) =

American high jumper

Personal information
- Nationality: American
- Born: August 21, 1941
- Died: April 1969 (aged 27)

Sport
- Sport: Athletics
- Event: High jump

Barbara Brown (August 21, 1941 – April 1969) was an American athlete. She competed in the women's high jump at the 1960 Summer Olympics.
