= Michal Lamdani =

Personal information
- Native name: מיכל למדני
- Full name: Michal Lamdani-Cohen
- Nationality: Israeli
- Born: December 5, 1944 (age 81)
- Height: 5 ft 7.5 in (171 cm)
- Weight: 141 lb (64 kg)

Sport
- Sport: Track & field
- Event: High jump

Achievements and titles
- National finals: Israeli national high jump champion (1960-66, 1968)

Michal Lamdani (Hebrew: מיכל למדני; born December 5, 1944), also Michal Lamdani-Cohen, is an Israeli former Olympic high jumper, eight-time Israeli champion, and former Maccabiah Games gold medal winner.

She was born in Israel, and is Jewish.

== High jumping career ==
Lamdani was the Israeli Women's high jump champion in 1960–66, and in 1968 (as Michal Cohen), with a best jump of 3.65 metres.

Lamdani competed for Israel at the 1964 Summer Olympics in Tokyo, Japan, at the age of 19. In the Women's High Jump she tied for 19th out of 26 competitors, with a best height cleared of 1.65 metres. When she competed in the Olympics, she was 5 ft 7.5 in (171 cm) tall and weighed 141 lb (64 kg).

She competed for Israel at the 1965 Maccabiah Games, winning a gold medal in the high jump.
