= Marian Needham =

Former British athlete

Personal information
- Nationality: British (English)
- Born: 9 September 1941 (age 84) Rutland, England

Sport
- Sport: Athletics
- Event: Long jump
- Club: Walton AC

Marian I. Needham also spelt Marion Needham (born 9 September 1941), is a female former athlete who competed for England.

== Biography ==
Needham represented England in the long jump at the 1958 British Empire and Commonwealth Games in Cardiff, Wales.

Needham finished second behind Mary Bignal in the long jump event at the 1959 WAAA Championships and was second again, this time behind Ann Packer at the 1960 WAAA Championships.

Needham, a shorthand typist at the time, informed the British Olympic selectors that she was unavailable for selection for the 1960 Olympic Games in Rome because she did not want to leave her fiancée. She married Clive Jones the following year and competed under her married name thereafter.

She later coached at Feltham Middlesex AC.
