= Mildred McDaniel =

American high jumper (1933–2004)

Personal information
- Full name: Mildred Louise McDaniel-Singleton
- Born: Mildred Louise McDaniel; November 4, 1933 Atlanta, Georgia, U.S.
- Died: September 30, 2004 (aged 70) Pasadena, California, U.S.
Medal record
Women's athletics
Representing the United States
Olympic Games
Gold medal – first place	1956 Melbourne	High jump
Pan American Games
Gold medal – first place	1955 Mexico City	High jump

Mildred "Millie" Louise McDaniel-Singleton (née McDaniel, November 4, 1933 – September 30, 2004) was an American athlete, who competed mainly in the women's high jump event during her career.

Born in Atlanta, Georgia, she attended David T. Howard High School. She competed for the United States at the 1956 Summer Olympics held in Melbourne, Australia where she won the gold medal in the women's high jump event. In the process, she beat the current world record holder, Iolanda Balas and set a new world record.

She attended the Tuskegee Institute where she played basketball. While there she was the National Champion in 1953, 1955 and 1956. In 1983 she was inducted into the Georgia Sports Hall of Fame.

== Death ==
McDaniel-Singleton died of cancer, aged 70, in Pasadena, California.
