= Terri Brown =

American high jumper

Personal information
- Nationality: American
- Born: September 27, 1947 (age 78) Birmingham, Alabama, United States

Sport
- Sport: Athletics
- Event: High jump

Terri Brown (born September 27, 1947) is an American athlete. She competed in the women's high jump at the 1964 Summer Olympics.
