= Gerda Kupferschmied =

German high jumper

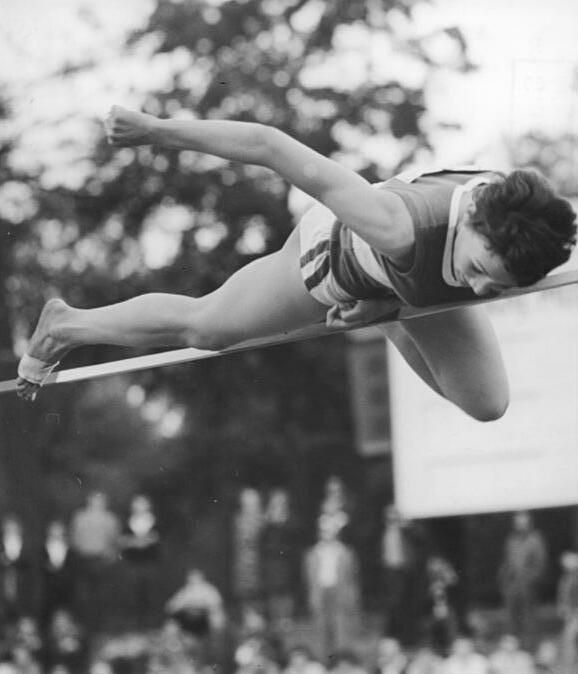
- Gerda Kupferschmied

Personal information
- Nationality: German
- Born: 19 August 1942 (age 83) Cottbus, Nazi Germany

Sport
- Sport: Athletics
- Event: High jump

Gerda Kupferschmied (born 19 August 1942) is a German athlete. She competed in the women's high jump at the 1964 Summer Olympics.
