= Bärbel Graf =

East German high jumper

Bärbel Graf (born 25 June 1949) is a retired East German high jumper.

She finished ninth at the 1966 European Championships. She also became East German champion in 1966, competing for the sports club SC DHfK Leipzig.
