= Neomia Rodgers =

American high jumper (born 1940)

Neomia Rogers
Personal information
- Nationality: American
- Born: July 12, 1940
- Died: January 13, 2025 (aged 84)

Sport
- Sport: Athletics
- Event: High jump

Neomia Rogers (July 12, 1940 – January 13, 2025) was an American athlete. She competed in the women's high jump at the 1960 Summer Olympics.
