= Jarosława Jóźwiakowska =

Polish high jumper (born 1937)

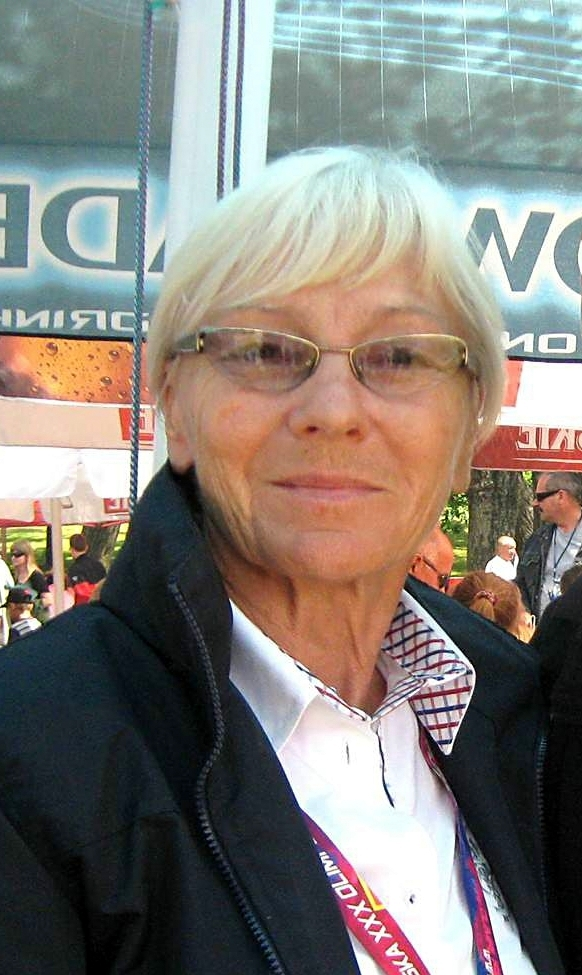

Personal information
- Born: 20 January 1937 (age 89) Poznań, Poland
- Height: 1.67 m (5 ft 6 in)
- Weight: 59 kg (130 lb)

Sport
- Sport: Track and field
- Club: AZS-AWF Gdańsk; AZS Kraków
Medal record
Representing Poland
Olympic Games
Silver medal – second place	1960 Rome	High jump
European Championships
Bronze medal – third place	1966 Budapest	High jump
Summer Universiade
Bronze medal – third place	1959 Turin	High jump

Jarosława Jóźwiakowska (later Bieda, Ringer, Zdunkiewicz; born January 20, 1937) is a Polish athlete who mainly competed in the high jump.

She competed for Poland at the 1960 Summer Olympics held in Rome, Italy in the high jump where she won the silver medal jointly with Dorothy Shirley. At the 1964 Summer Olympics in Tokyo she ended up in 10th place.

She won a bronze medal at the 1966 European Championships in Budapest.

Her personal best in the event is 1.75 metres set in 1964, which was the national record at the time.

== International competitions ==
Year	Competition	Venue	Position	Event	Notes
Representing Poland
1957	World University Games	Paris, France	3rd	High jump	1.55 m
1959	Universiade	Turin, Italy	6th	4 × 100 m relay	49.2 s
1959	Universiade	Turin, Italy	3rd	High jump	1.61 m
1960	Olympic Games	Rome, Italy	2nd	High jump	1.71 m
1961	Universiade	Sofia, Bulgaria	4th	High jump	1.65 m
1962	European Championships	Belgrade, Yugoslavia	7th	High jump	1.64 m
1964	Olympic Games	Tokyo, Japan	10th	High jump	1.71 m
1965	European Cup Final	Kassel, West Germany	3rd	High jump	1.64 m
1966	European Championships	Budapest, Hungary	3rd	High jump	1.71 m
