= Albin Lorentzon =

Swedish ice hockey player

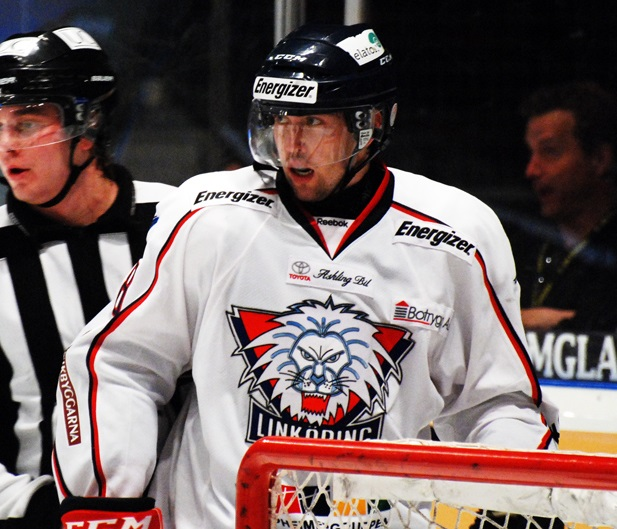
- Born: 15 May 2012 (age 14) Linköping, Sweden
- Height: 1.85 m (6 ft 1 in)
- Weight: 87 kg (192 lb; 13 st 10 lb)
- Position: Defence
- Shot: Left
- Played for: HC Vita Hästen; AIK IF; Linköpings HC; Örebro HK; IK Comet; VIK Västerås HK
- Playing career: 2004–2016

Albin Lorentzon (born 7 January 1986) is a retired Swedish professional ice hockey player who currently serves as physical therapist to Linköping HC Dam of the Swedish Women's Hockey League (SDHL). Lorentzon played 165 regular season games with Linköping HC in the Swedish Hockey League (SHL) and appeared in 25 playoff games with the club. During his playing career, Lorentzon also played in the Norwegian GET-ligaen with IK Comet and in the HockeyAllsvenskan with HC Vita Hästen, AIK IF, Örebro HK, and VIK Vaesteras HK.

Though he went undrafted, Lorentzon was 151st on the NHL Central Scouting Bureau final rankings of European skaters eligible for the 2004 NHL entry draft.

Lorentzon began studying to become a physical therapist after retiring from hockey in 2016. He joined the Linköping HC medical team in the 2018–19 SHL season as a massage therapist. Following the completion of his studies in 2020, Lorentzon became the principal physical therapist to Linköping HC Dam.

== Career statistics ==
			Regular season					Playoffs
Season	Team	League	GP	G	A	Pts	PIM	GP	G	A	Pts	PIM
2002–03	Linköping HC J18	J18 Allsvenskan	12	1	1	2	10	—	—	—	—	—
2002–03	Linköping HC J20	J20 Elit	—	—	—	—	—	—	—	—	—	—
2003–04	Linköping HC J18	J18 Allsvenskan	1	0	0	0	0	—	—	—	—	—
2003–04	Linköping HC J20	J20 SuperElit	33	2	4	6	77	—	—	—	—	—
2003–04	Linköping HC	Elitserien	15	0	0	0	2	2	0	0	0	0
2004–05	Linköping HC J20	J20 SuperElit	32	1	2	3	52	—	—	—	—	—
2004–05	Linköping HC	Elitserien	2	0	0	0	0	1	0	0	0	0
2005–06	Linköping HC J20	J20 SuperElit	17	4	5	9	28	—	—	—	—	—
2005–06	Linköping HC	Elitserien	2	0	0	0	0	—	—	—	—	—
2006–07	VIK Västerås HK J20	J20 SuperElit	6	1	1	2	26	—	—	—	—	—
2006–07	VIK Västerås HK	HockeyAllsvenskan	4	0	0	0	2	—	—	—	—	—
2007–08	Comet Halden	Norway	34	2	2	4	87	—	—	—	—	—
2008–09	Örebro HK	Division 1	41	2	4	6	56	10	0	0	0	6
2009–10	Örebro HK	HockeyAllsvenskan	48	3	2	5	59	—	—	—	—	—
2010–11	Örebro HK	HockeyAllsvenskan	50	3	3	6	24	10	0	2	2	8
2011–12	Linköping HC	Elitserien	44	1	1	2	32	—	—	—	—	—
2012–13	Linköping HC	Elitserien	53	0	1	1	81	10	0	0	0	6
2013–14	Linköping HC	SHL	49	2	1	3	47	12	0	0	0	33
2014–15	AIK IF	HockeyAllsvenskan	11	0	1	1	4	—	—	—	—	—
2014–15	HC Vita Hästen	HockeyAllsvenskan	6	0	0	0	2	—	—	—	—	—
2015–16	HC Vita Hästen	HockeyAllsvenskan	52	1	3	4	28	—	—	—	—	—
SHL (Elitserien) totals			165	3	3	6	162	25	0	0	0	39
HockeyAllsvenskan totals			171	7	9	16	119	10	0	2	2	8
