= George Silk =

Photojournalist

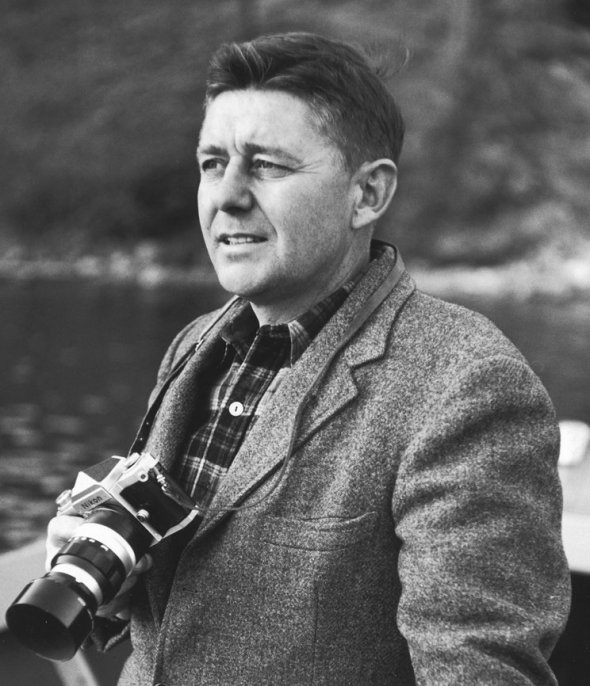
- Born: Arthur George Silk; 17 November 1916; Levin, New Zealand
- Died: 23 October 2004 (aged 87); Norwalk, Connecticut, U.S.
- Occupation: Photojournalist
- Spouse: Margery Gray Schieber (1947–2004)

George Silk (17 November 1916 – 23 October 2004) was a New Zealand-born Australian photojournalist. He served as a photojournalist for Life for 30 years.

== Early life ==
Silk was born in the New Zealand town of Levin, New Zealand, the fourth child of Arthur Silk and Emma Constance Naylor. He left school at the age of 14 and worked in a camera shop at 16.

== Career ==
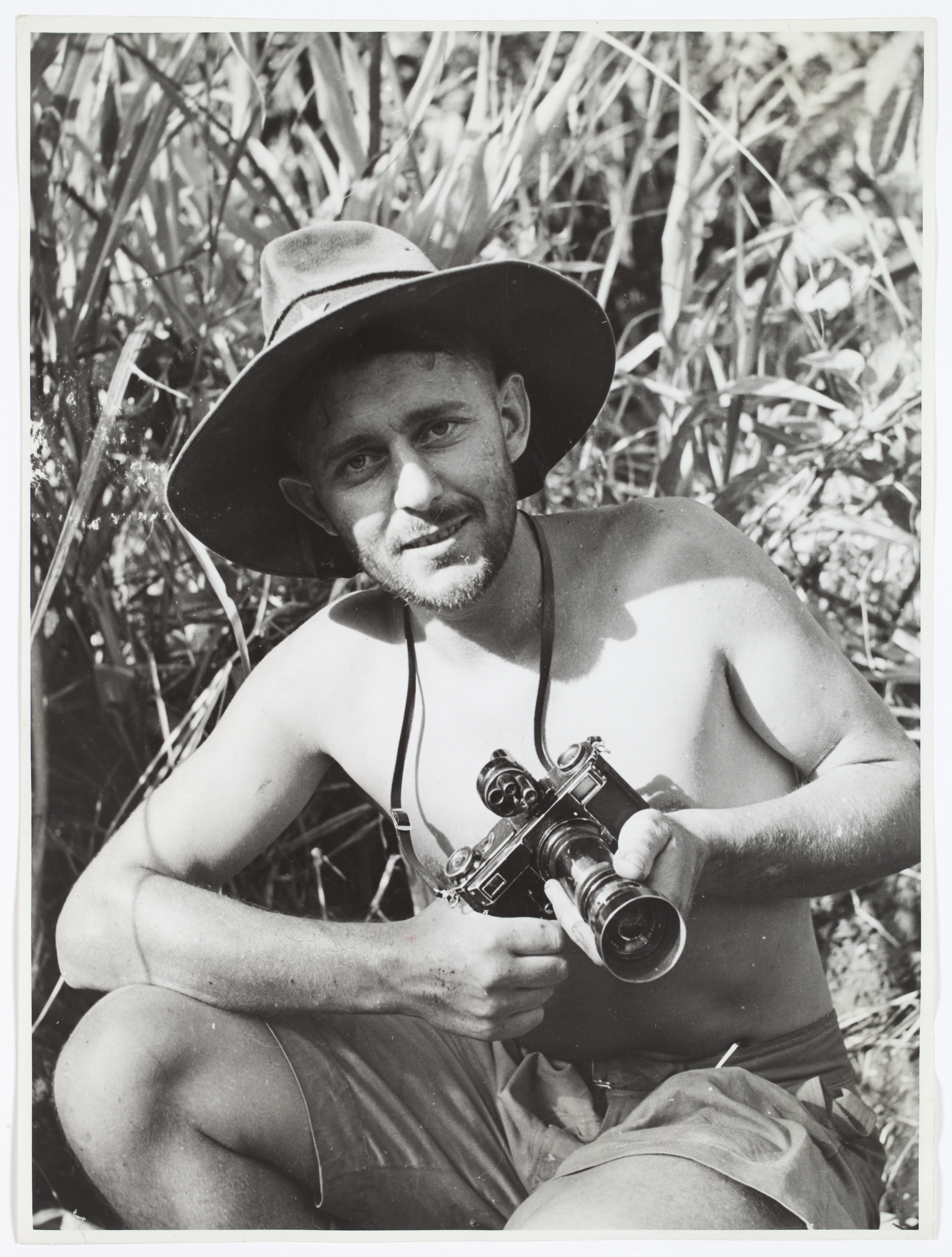
George Silk in New Guinea

His career as a war photographer began in 1939, when he was a combat cameraman for the Australian government, covering action in the Middle East, North Africa and Greece. Trapped with the famed Desert Rats at Tobruk in Libya, he was captured by German field marshal Erwin Rommel's forces but escaped 10 days later.

He worked for Life magazine from 1943 to 1972.

Silk photographed many important events during World War II. He covered the war on the Italian front, the Allied invasions of France and the Pacific. In New Guinea, Silk walked 300 miles with the Allied forces, an ordeal later described in the book War in New Guinea. He was with U.S. forces in the Battle of the Bulge in 1944 and was wounded by a grenade during a river crossing in Germany. His co-worker Will Lang Jr. reported on the Battle of the Bulge and the river crossing. Silk took the first photographs of Nagasaki, Japan, after the atomic bomb was dropped there on 9 August 1945, as well as Japanese war criminals awaiting trial in post-war Tokyo.

Following the war, Silk’s work primarily focused on sports photography and found innovative ways to capture motion. His expertise included sailing and once shot the America’s Cup races atop a 90-foot mast.

In December 1972, Silk was in Nepal, shooting an assignment on Himalayan game parks, when he received news that the magazine had folded. According to the 1977 book That Was the Life, he replied by saying, "Your message . . . badly garbled. Please send one-half million dollars additional expenses."

== Accolades ==
In 1961, Silk was chosen as one of 50 outstanding Americans of meritorious performance in the fields of endeavour, to be honoured as a Guest of Honor to the first annual Banquet of the Golden Plate in Monterey, California. Honor was awarded by vote of the National Panel of Distinguished Americans of the Academy of Achievement.

Edward Steichen included his pictures taken in Jamaica in the 1955 Museum of Modern Art exhibition The Family of Man which toured the world to be seen by 9 million visitors.

He was named magazine photographer of the year four times by the National Press Photographers Association.

== Personal ==
Silk became a U.S. citizen in 1947 and married Margery Gray Schieber on 22 November 1947 at San Gabriel, California, USA. Silk died in Norwalk, Connecticut on 23 October 2004 due to congestive heart failure.

Selected photographs by George Silk

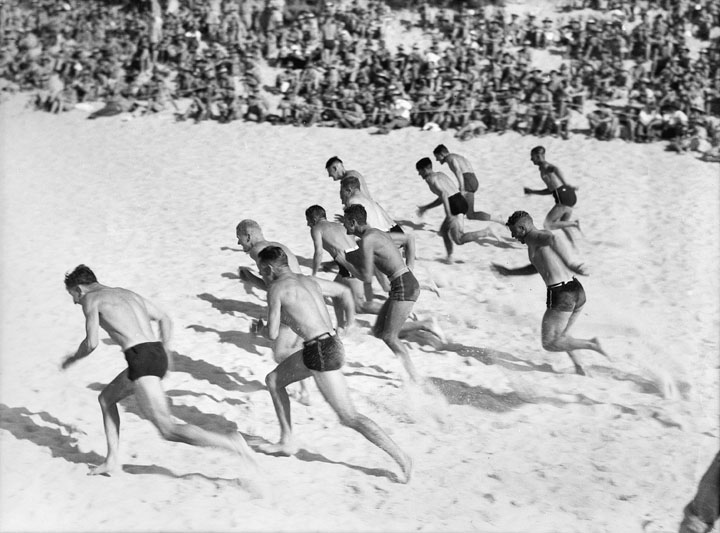
Beach sports under summer skies, Gaza Beach, September 1941

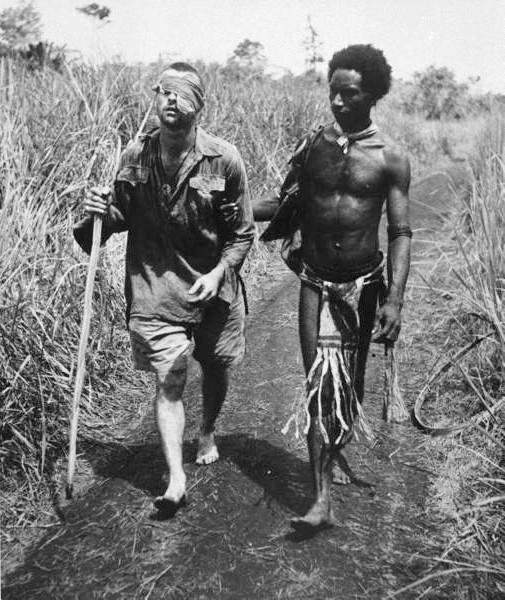
An Australian soldier, Private George "Dick" Whittington, is aided by Papuan orderly Raphael Oimbari, near Buna on 25 December 1942. Whittington died in February 1943 from the effects of bush typhus

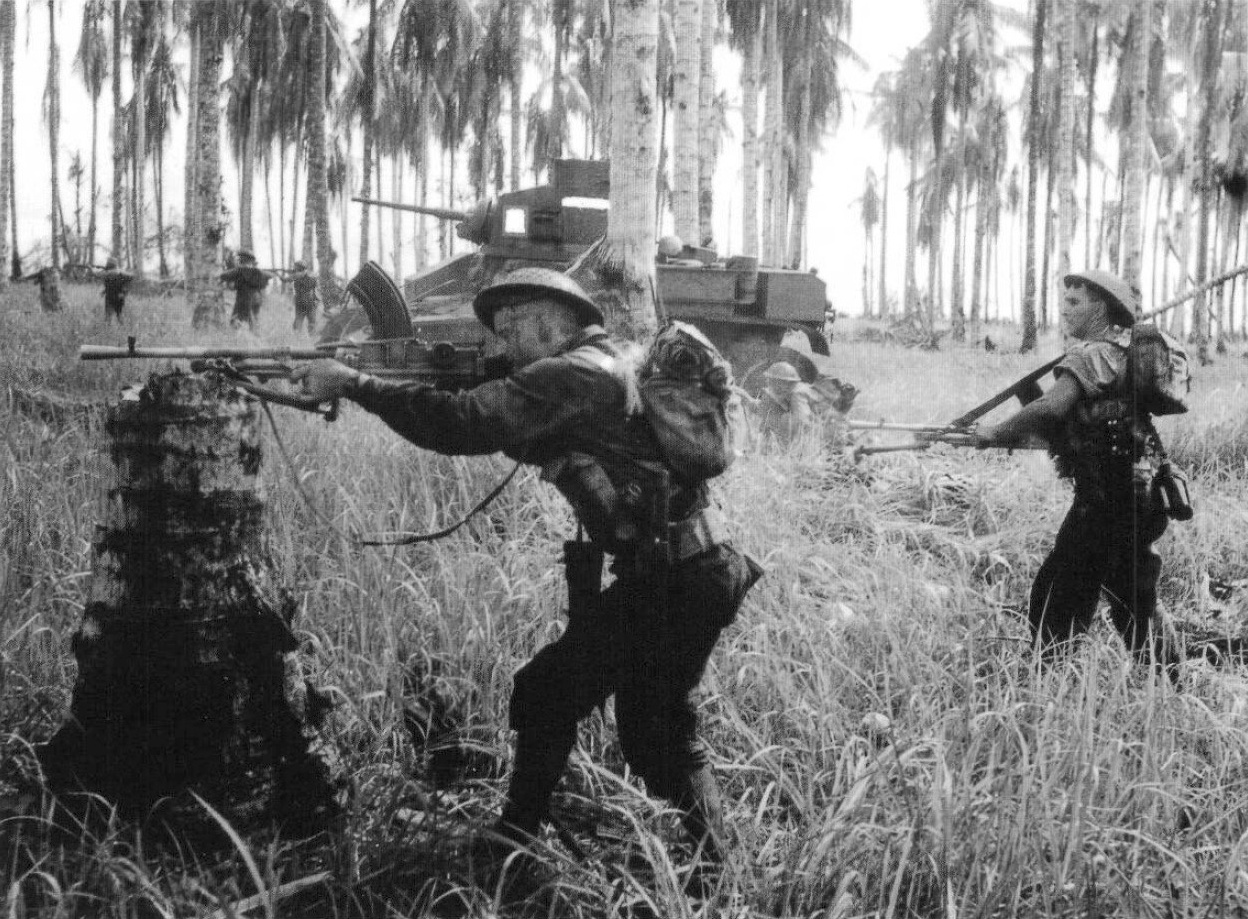
Australian assault on pillbox, January 1943, Papua, Giropa Point

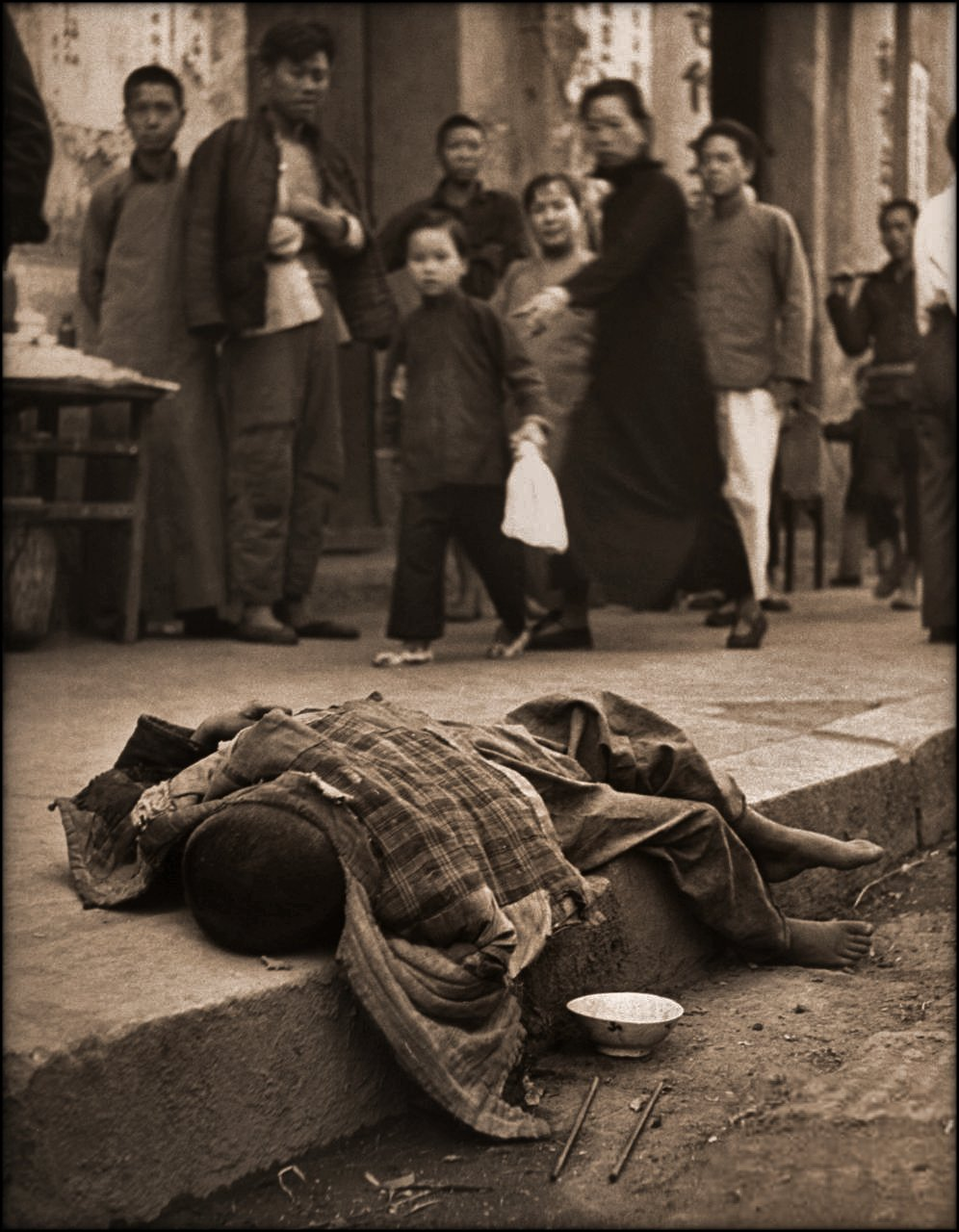
During The Famine Young Child Dying in the Gutter, China (1946)

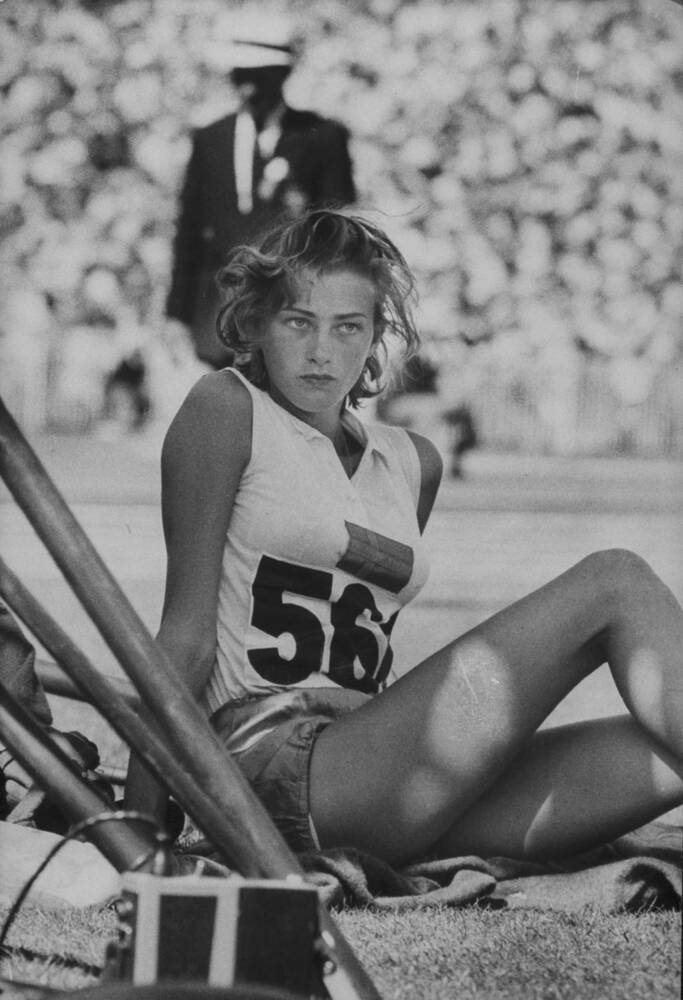
Gunhild Larking at the 1956 Olympic Games. Published in the 17 December 1956 issues of both LIFE and Sports Illustrated, this photo became widely famous and the Swedish athlete herself received many calls to pose as a model.
