= Maria Aparecida Soares Ruas =

Brazilian mathematician

Maria Aparecida Soares Ruas (1948–2025) was a Brazilian mathematician specializing in differential geometry and singularity theory. She was a professor at the University of São Paulo.

== Education and career ==
Ruas was born on 5 January 1948, in Lins, São Paulo. She became interested in mathematics through a junior high school mathematics teacher, Râmisa Jorge, and after entering university study in 1967, earned a licenciate in mathematics in 1970 through what is now the Faculty of Science and Letters of the Araraquara campus of São Paulo State University.

She became a teaching assistant at the same campus in 1971, while at the same time studying for a master's degree at the University of São Paulo, working there with Gilberto Francisco Loibel; she completed her degree in 1974, and was promoted to assistant professor. In 1982 she moved to the University of São Paulo as a professor. She defended her doctoral dissertation, Finity Determinacy and Applications at the University of São Paulo in 1983. It was jointly advised by Luiz Antonio Fávaro and Terence Gaffney.

She headed the mathematics department at the University of São Paulo, was a founding member of the Brazilian Mathematical Society, and organized the biennial Workshop on Real and Complex Singularities in Brazil. She was a coauthor of the book Differential Geometry from a Singularity Theory Viewpoint (World Scientific, 2016, with Shyuichi Izumiya, Maria del Carmen Romero Fuster, and Farid Tari).

== Recognition and awards ==
Ruas was a member of the Brazilian Academy of Sciences, elected in 2008, and in 2009 was named a commander in the National Order of Scientific Merit.

In January 2025, she received the Latin American Prize for Mathematical Leadership from the Institute of Mathematical Sciences of the Americas, in recognition of her scientific contributions and her role in academic training. The Prize is awarded to an individual or a group whose work enhances collaboration and advances research connecting mathematicians across multiple countries in the Americas.
