= Florence Pétry-Amiel =

French high jumper

Personal information
- Nationality: France
- Born: 29 September 1942 (age 83) Soustons (Landes)
- Years active: 1960s
- Height: 1.81 m (5 ft 11 in)
- Weight: 65Kg

Sport
- Event: High Jump
- Club: CSA Molière, Paris

Achievements and titles
- Personal best: 1.68 m (1959)

Florence Pétry-Amiel (born 29 September 1942, at Soustons, country), is a former French athlete who specialized in the High Jump.

== Biography ==
Florence-Petry Amiel was ninth in the High Jump competition at the 1960 Summer Olympics at Rome.

She was also champion of France in the high jump in 1961.
