= Mariya Pisareva =

Soviet high jumper (1933–2023)

Olympic medal record

Women's Athletics
Silver medal – second place	1956 Melbourne	High jump

Mariya Pisareva (Russian: Мария Писарева; 19 April 1933 – 10 December 2023) was a Soviet athlete who competed mainly in the High Jump. She trained at Zenit in Moscow.

Pisareva competed in the 1956 Summer Olympics held in Melbourne, Australia in the High Jump where she won the silver medal jointly with Thelma Hopkins.

After her athletic career, she married a discus thrower Oto Grigalka. Mariya Pisareva died on 10 December 2023, at the age of 90.
