= Marjan Ackermans-Thomas =

Dutch pentathlete

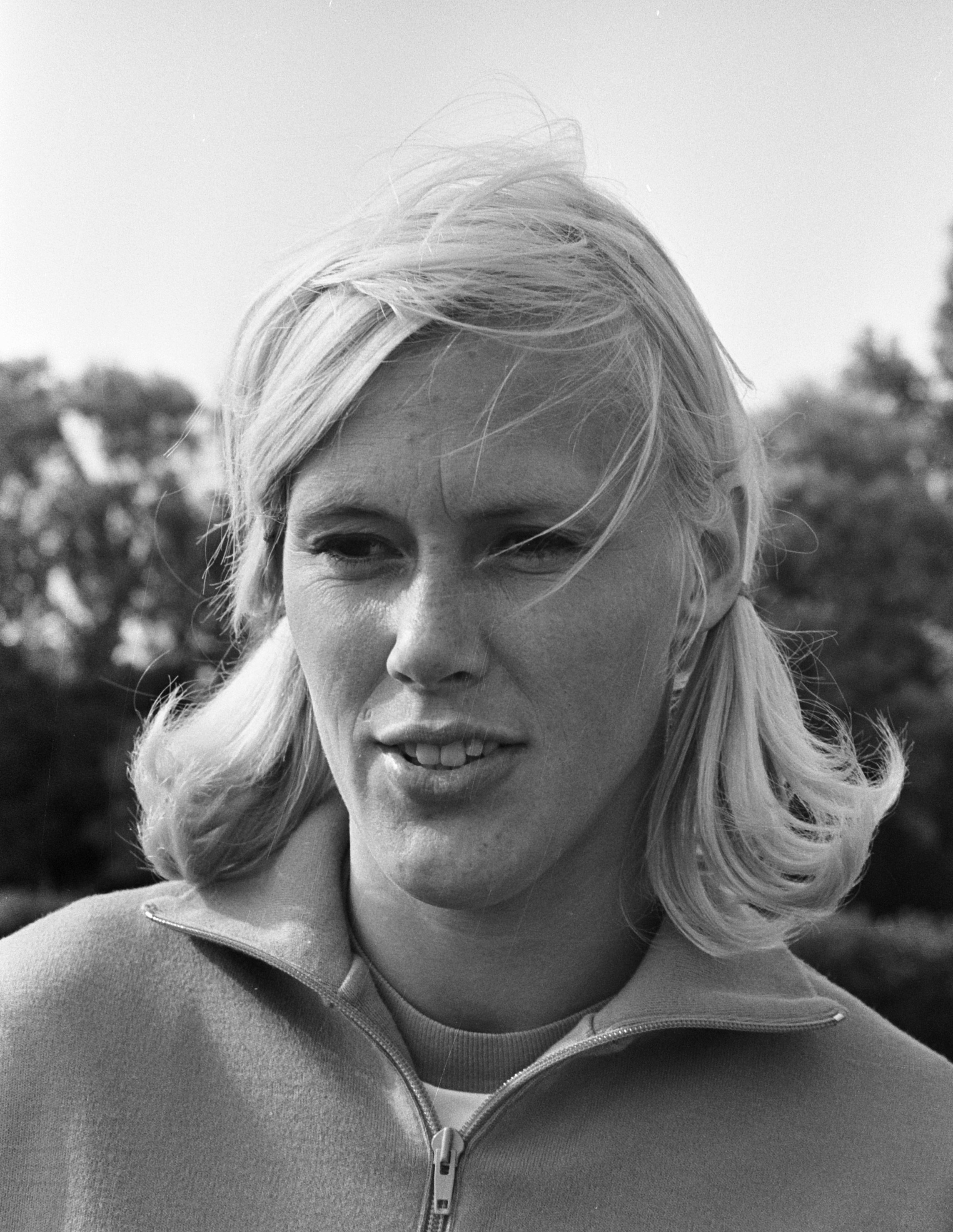
- Marjan Ackermans-Thomas in 1969

Personal information
- Born: 5 April 1942 (age 84) Beverwijk, the Netherlands
- Height: 1.80 m (5 ft 11 in)
- Weight: 70 kg (150 lb)

Sport
- Sport: Pentathlon
- Club: DEM, Beverwijk

Marianne "Marjan" Ackermans-Thomas (born 5 April 1942) is a retired Dutch pentathlete. She competed at the 1968 Summer Olympics and finished in 17th place.
