= Galina Dolya =

Soviet high jumper

Personal information
- Nationality: Soviet
- Born: 2 March 1933
- Died: 29 April 2021 (aged 88)

Sport
- Sport: Athletics
- Event: High jump

Galina Dolya (2 March 1933 – 29 April 2021) was a Soviet athlete. She competed in the women's high jump at the 1960 Summer Olympics.
