= Simone Ruas =

French high jumper

Personal information
- Full name: Simone Marie Ruas
- Nationality: French
- Born: 10 June 1919 Neuilly-sur-Seine, France
- Died: 14 January 2001 (aged 81) Nice, France

Sport
- Sport: Athletics
- Event: High jump

Simone Marie Ruas (10 June 1919 – 14 January 2001) was a French athlete. She competed in the women's high jump at the 1948 Summer Olympics.
