= Mitsuko Torii =

Japanese athlete

Personal information
- Nationality: Japanese
- Born: 9 August 1943 (age 82)

Sport
- Sport: Athletics
- Event: High jump

Mitsuko Torii (鳥居 充子, Torii Mitsuko; born 9 August 1943) is a Japanese athlete. She competed in the women's high jump at the 1964 Summer Olympics.
