= Nel Zwier =

Dutch high jumper

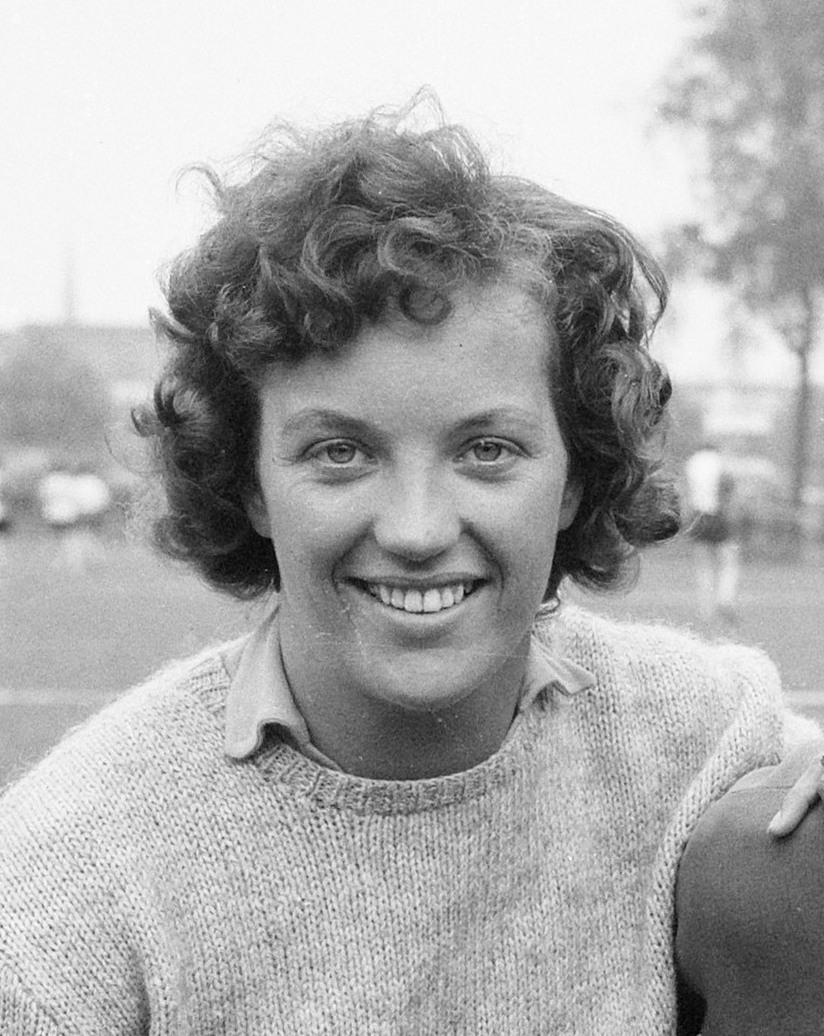
- Nel Zwier in 1962

Personal information
- Nationality: Dutch
- Born: 29 August 1936 Enkhuizen, Netherlands
- Died: 8 October 2001 (aged 65) Enkhuizen, Netherlands
- Height: 1.74 m (5 ft 9 in)
- Weight: 70 kg (150 lb) Athletics

Sport
- Event: high jump
- Club: HBS Flevo

Petronella Veronica Maria "Nel" Zwier (29 August 1936 – 8 October 2001) was a Dutch high jumper who competed at the 1960 Summer Olympics.

== Biography ==
Zwier won the British WAAA Championships title in the high jump event at the 1959 WAAA Championships. with a jump of 1.65 m.

At the 1960 Olympic Games in Rome, she finished in equal ninth place in the high jump competition.
