= Inga-Britt Lorentzon =

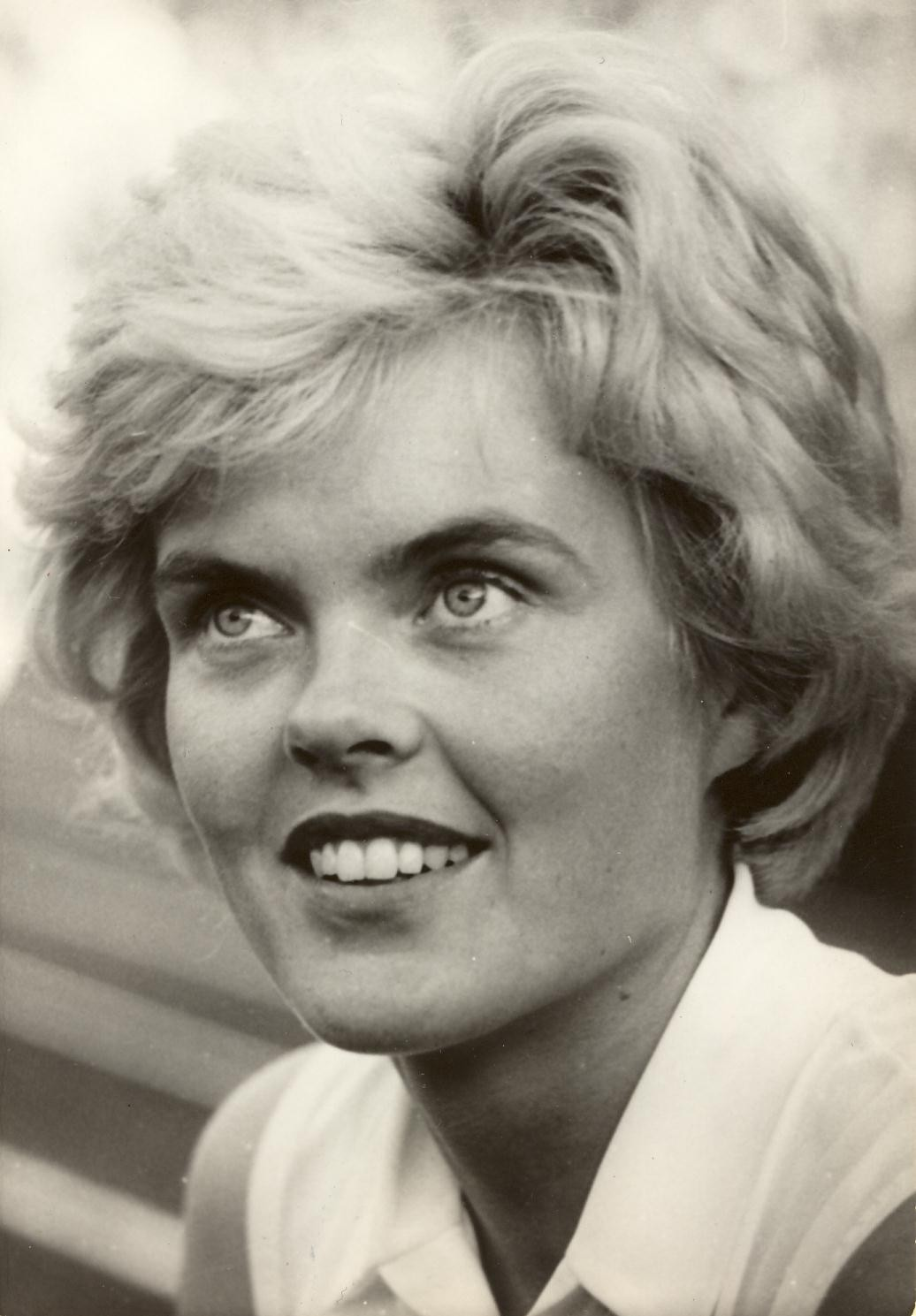

Personal information
- Born: 21 February 1936 Västerås, Sweden
- Died: 15 June 1987 (aged 51) Olofström, Sweden
- Height: 1.73 m (5 ft 8 in)
- Weight: 62 kg (137 lb)

Sport
- Sport: Athletics
- Event(s): High jump, hurdles
- Club: IFK Västerås

Achievements and titles
- Personal best(s): HJ – 1.75 m 80 mH – 12.2

Barbro Anita Inga-Britt Lorentzon (née Gyborn, 21 February 1936 – 15 June 1987) was a Swedish high jumper. She competed at the 1960 Summer Olympics and finished in sixth place.

Lorentzon won Swedish titles in the high jump in 1959 and 1960 and in the pentathlon in 1960. She held the Swedish high jump record and was an elite hurdler. Her daughters Susanne and Annika also became international athletes.
