= Canel Konvur =

Turkish high jumper (1939–2018)

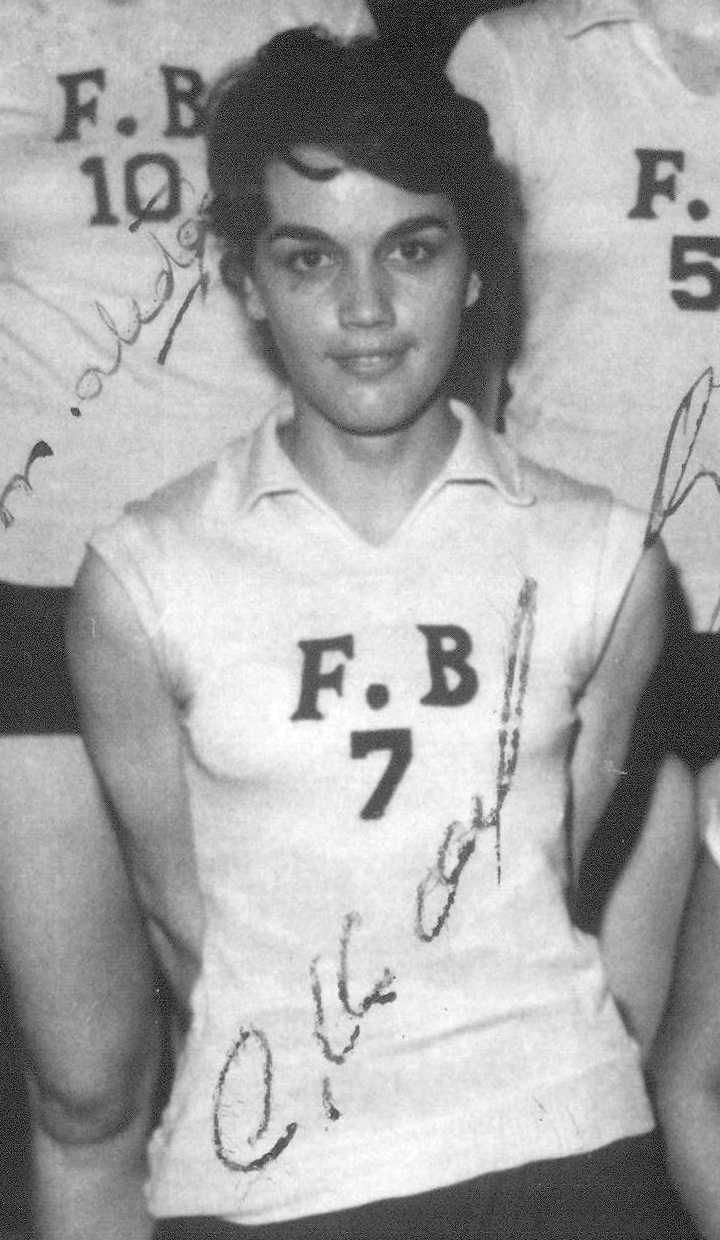

Personal information
- Nationality: Turkish
- Born: 27 November 1939 Kuşadası, Turkey
- Died: 4 June 2018 (aged 78)

Sport
- Sport: Athletics
- Event: High jump

Canel Konvur (27 November 1939 – 4 June 2018) was a Turkish athlete. She competed in the women's high jump at the 1960 Summer Olympics.
