= Reinelde Knapp =

Austrian high jumper

Reinelde Knapp-Bartenbach
Personal information
- Nationality: Austrian
- Born: Reinelde Knapp; 8 February 1933 Nüziders, Austria
- Died: 14 September 2022 (aged 89) Bludenz, Austria

Sport
- Sport: Athletics
- Event: High jump

Reinelde Knapp-Bartenbach (née Knapp; 8 February 1933 – 14 September 2022) was an Austrian athlete. She competed in the women's high jump at the 1956 Summer Olympics.
