= Gunhild Larking =

Swedish high jumper

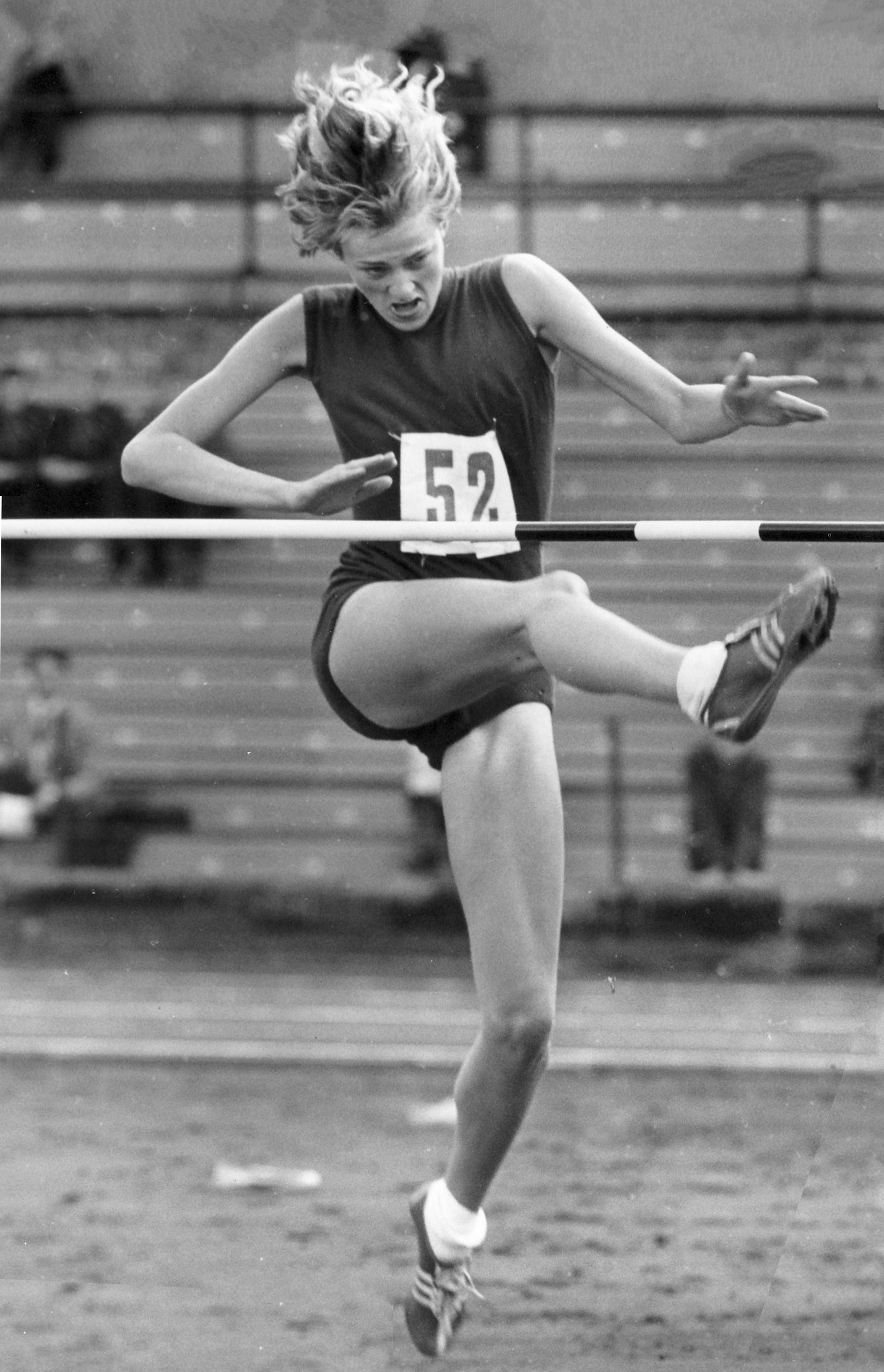

Personal information
- Born: 13 January 1936 (age 90) Jönköping, Sweden
- Height: 1.73 m (5 ft 8 in)
- Weight: 56 kg (123 lb)

Sport
- Sport: Athletics
- Event: High jump
- Club: Jönköpings AIF

Achievements and titles
- Personal best: 1.67 m (1956)

Gunhild Maria Larking (born 13 January 1936) is a retired Swedish high jumper.

== Biography ==
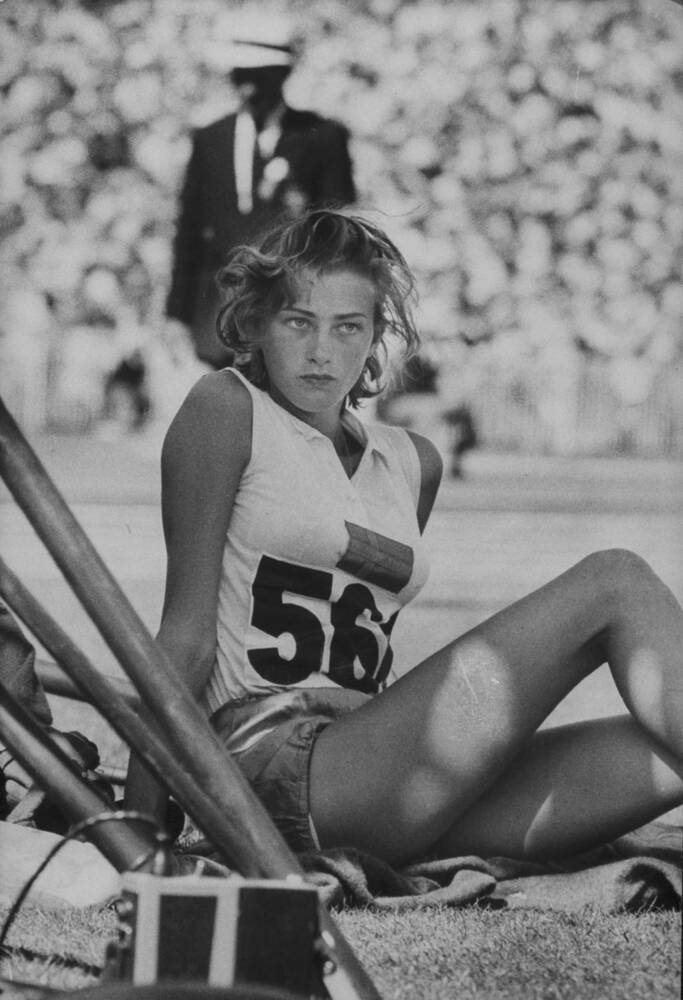
Gunhild Larking in 1956 Olympic Games. This photograph from Life received international spreading and Larking herself began a career as a model.

She competed at the 1952 Summer Olympics, 1954 European Athletics Championships and 1956 Summer Olympics and placed ninth in 1952 and fourth in 1954 and 1956. She won five consecutive national titles from 1952 to 1956.

While she was at the 1956 Summer Olympic Games, she was the subject of a series of shots taken by George Silk. Ten such photographs were featured in a two-page spread titled "Sixth Best Jumper" in the 17 December 1956 issue of Sports Illustrated, one of which also appeared in its sibling publication LIFE that same week. The one in both magazines received international fame and Larking herself began receiving requests as a model.
