= Olga Modrachová =

Czech athletics competitor

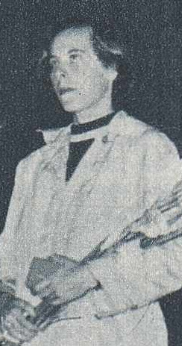

Personal information
- Nationality: Czech
- Born: 9 May 1930 Prague, Czechoslovakia
- Died: 30 January 1995 (aged 64) Brno, Czech Republic

Sport
- Sport: Athletics
- Event: High jump
Medal record
Women's athletics
Representing Czechoslovakia
European Championships
Bronze medal – third place	1950 Brussels	Pentathlon
Bronze medal – third place	1954 Bern	High jump

Olga Modrachová, married Davidová (9 May 1930 – 30 January 1995) was a Czech athlete. She competed in the women's high jump at the 1952 Summer Olympics and the 1956 Summer Olympics.

Her husband was Jiří David, a Czech sprinter.
