= Taisia Chenchik =

Soviet high jumper

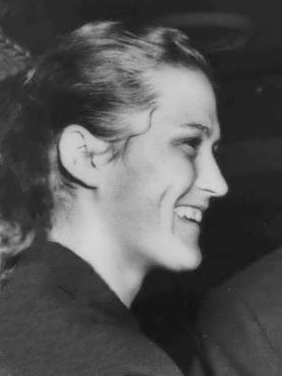
- Chenchik at the US-Soviet meet in Philadelphia in 1959

Personal information
- Born: 30 January 1936 Pryluky, Ukrainian SSR, Soviet Union
- Died: 19 November 2013 (aged 77) Moscow, Russia
- Height: 175 cm (5 ft 9 in)
- Weight: 54 kg (119 lb)

Sport
- Sport: Athletics
- Event: High jump
- Club: Burevestnik Chelyabinsk (1956–62); Burevestnik Moscow (1963–69)

Achievements and titles
- Personal best: 1.78 m (1959)
Medal record
Women's athletics
Representing the Soviet Union
Olympic Games
Bronze medal – third place	1964 Tokyo	High jump
European Championships
Silver medal – second place	1958 Stockholm	High jump
Gold medal – first place	1966 Budapest	High jump
European Indoor Games
Gold medal – first place	1967 Prague	High jump
Universiade
Gold medal – first place	1963 Porto Alegre	High jump

Taisiya Filipivna Chenchik (Russian: Таисия Филипповна Ченчик; 30 January 1936 – 19 November 2013) was a Soviet high jumper. She competed at the 1960 and 1964 Olympics and finished fifth and third, respectively. At the European championships she won a gold medal in 1966 and a silver in 1958. Chenchik also won the high jump event at the 1963 Universiade, 1967 European Indoor Championships, USSR-USA dual meets (1958–59, 1962–63, 1965) and Soviet championships (1957–59 and 1962).

Chenchik was born in Ukraine in 1936. In 1941, when Germany invaded Ukraine during World War II, her family was evacuated to Chelyabinsk. There she took up athletics while studying at the Chelyabinsk Polytechnic Institute. In 1959 she graduated in electrical engineering, and then worked as a lecturer at the same institute (1959–62) and at the Moscow Power Engineering Institute (1963–91). In retirement she headed Moscow Veteran's Athletics Federation and was a board member of the Moscow Athletics Federation.
