= Iolanda Balaș =

Romanian high jumper

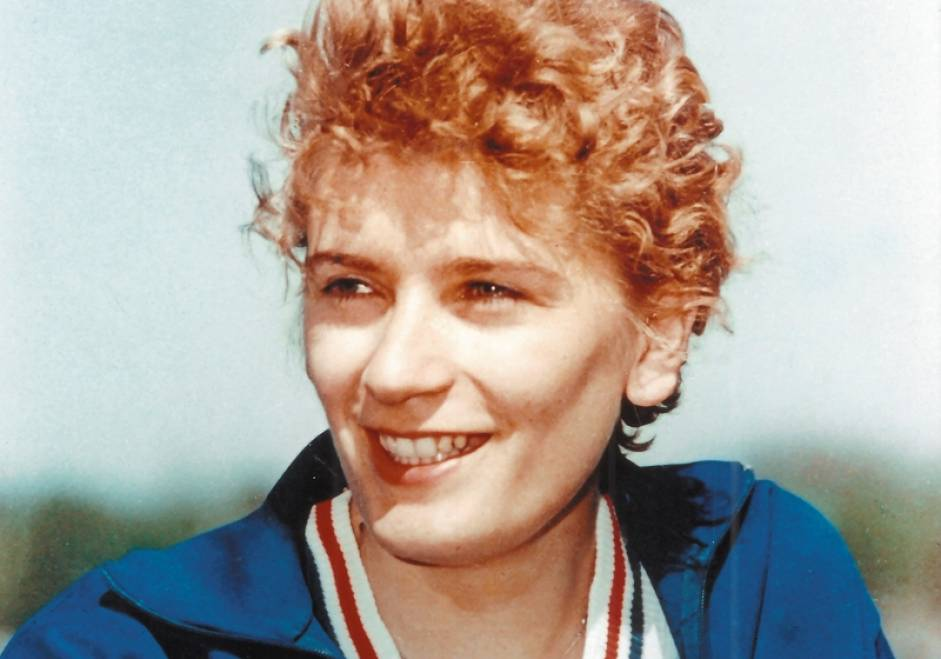
- Iolanda Balaș during the 1960s

Personal information
- Born: 12 December 1936 Timișoara, Romania
- Died: 11 March 2016 (aged 79) Bucharest, Romania
- Height: 1.85 m (6 ft 1 in)
- Weight: 72 kg (159 lb)

Sport
- Sport: Athletics
- Event: High jump

Achievements and titles
- Personal best: 1.91 m (1961)
Medal record
Women's athletics
Representing Romania
Olympic Games
Gold medal – first place	1960 Rome	High jump
Gold medal – first place	1964 Tokyo	High jump
European Championships
Gold medal – first place	1958 Stockholm	High jump
Gold medal – first place	1962 Belgrade	High jump
Silver medal – second place	1954 Bern	High jump
Universiade
Gold medal – first place	1959 Torino	High jump
Gold medal – first place	1961 Sofia	High jump

Iolanda Balaș (Romanian pronunciation: [joˈlanda ˈbalaʃ], Hungarian: Balázs Jolán, later Balázs-Sőtér Jolán; 12 December 1936 – 11 March 2016) was a Romanian athlete, an Olympic champion and former world record holder in the high jump. She was the first Romanian woman to win an Olympic gold medal and is considered to have been one of the greatest high jumpers of the twentieth century.

== Early life ==
Balaș was born in Timișoara to an ethnic Hungarian family. Her mother, Etel Bozó was a homemaker, while her father, Frigyes, was originally a locksmith. Her father served in the Hungarian army until he was captured and brought to the Soviet Union and later back to Hungary, where he settled in Budapest. Balaș tried to reunite the family and move to Hungary, but although she managed to obtain a Hungarian passport in 1947, she was not allowed to leave Romania. When asked in an interview in 2005 whether she had ever thought about defection, she said that it had crossed her mind; however, as it could have resulted in serious retaliation against her relatives, she did not want to risk it. In the interview she said, "I feel sorry that I did not win Olympics for Hungary. But a person represents herself and after that a nation. It was not given for me to bear the Hungarian colors, to make happy those who speak my mother tongue. It evolved this way and I feel sorry for it, but I would have gone mad if I would thought constantly about this contradictory situation. I hope that besides Romanians also Hungarians are proud of me."

== Career ==
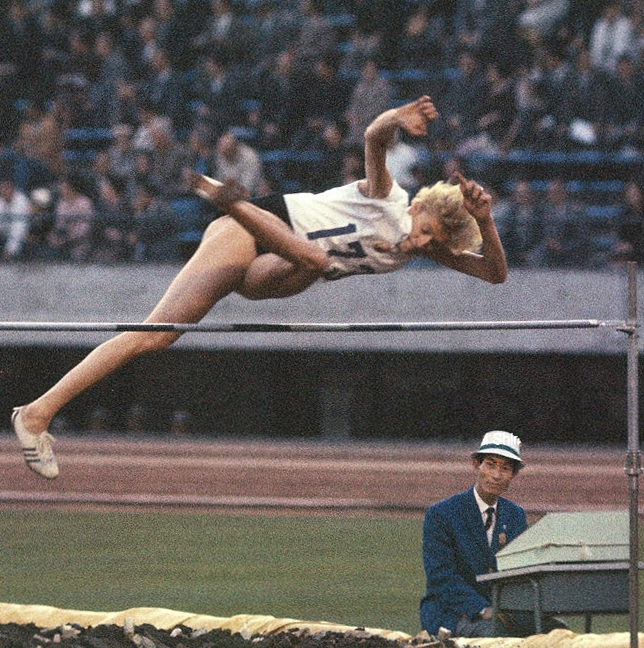
Balaș at the 1964 Summer Olympics in Tokyo

Balaș took up athletics owing to her caretaker Luisa Ernst, who was also a retired high jumper. In 1953 she transferred from Timișoara club "Electrica" to CCA (CSA Steaua). After finishing fifth in the 1956 Melbourne Olympics, she won Olympic gold medals at Rome in 1960 (becoming the first Romanian woman to do so) and Tokyo in 1964. At the 1964 Olympics she competed with a torn tendon, which forced her later to withdraw from the 1966 European Championships. Nevertheless, between 1957 and 1966, Balaș won 154 consecutive competitions, not including qualifying competitions or exhibitions. She improved the world record 14 times, from 1.75 m to 1.91 m, and equalled it once outdoors and once indoors. She was the first woman to jump over six feet. Her technique was a sophisticated version of the scissors technique.

Balaș won two British WAAA Championships high jump titles at the 1962 WAAA Championships and the 1963 WAAA Championships.

Her record of 1.91 m, set in 1961, lasted until the end of 1971 (beaten by Ilona Gusenbauer from Austria), when jumpers with a more efficient technique (the straddle technique, and later the Fosbury style) took over.

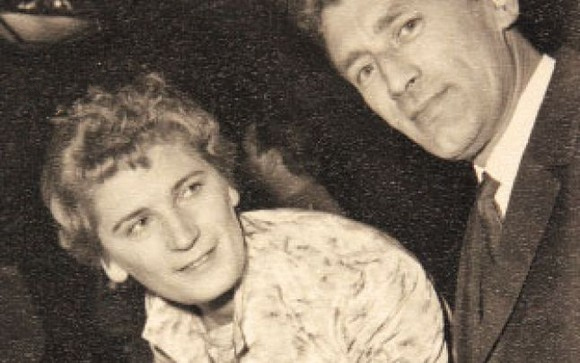
Balaș with her husband and coach Ioan Soter

After retiring from competition in 1967, Balaș married her former coach Ioan Söter, and taught physical education in Bucharest. Between 1988 and 2005 she was president of the Romanian Athletics Federation. She was also a member of the technical committee of the European Athletics Association, and in 1995 was elected to the women's commission of the International Association of Athletics Federations (IAAF).

== Death ==
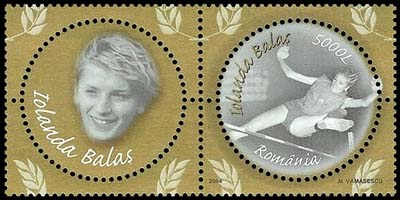
Balaș on 2004 Romanian stamps

Balaș was diagnosed with type II diabetes several years before her death and was hospitalized several times after that. She died following gastric complications at Elias Hospital in Bucharest, Romania, at the age of 79. She is buried at Ghencea Cemetery in Bucharest.

== Awards ==
Balaș was named an honorary citizen of Timișoara (in 1999) and of Bucharest (in 2001). In 2010, she received the royal decoration "Nihil Sine Deo" for special merits to the Romanian sports from Michael I of Romania, in a ceremony held at the Elisabeta Palace in Bucharest, for the way she led the Romanian Athletics Federation and to promote Romanian excellence in sport and young athletes. In 2000, Track & Field News voted Balaș as the best female high jumper of the 20th century. She was inducted into the IAAF Hall of Fame in 2012.

== See also ==
- Women's high jump world record progression

Records
Preceded by Thelma Hopkins	Women's high jump world record holder 14 July 1956 – 1 December 1956	Succeeded by Mildred McDaniel
Preceded by Mildred McDaniel	Women's high jump world record holder 13 October 1957 – 17 November 1957	Succeeded by Zheng Fengrong
Preceded by Zheng Fengrong	Women's high jump world record holder 7 June 1958 – 4 September 1971	Succeeded by Ilona Gusenbauer
