= Olga Gere =

Yugoslav high jumper

Personal information
- Born: September 27, 1942 (age 83) Novi Sad, SFR Yugoslavia
Medal record
Women's athletics
Representing Yugoslavia
European Championships
Silver medal – second place	1962 Belgrade	High jump
European Indoor Games
Silver medal – second place	1966 Dortmund	High jump

Olga Gere-Pulić, née Olga Gere (Serbian Cyrillic: Олга Гере-Пулић; born September 27, 1942, in Novi Sad, Yugoslavia) is a former Yugoslav high jumper.

She won first medal for Yugoslavia at the European Athletics Championships, silver in 1962. Gere represented Yugoslavia at the 1960 and 1964 Summer Olympics where she was placed 7th.

Awards
Preceded by Draga Stamejčić; Hilda Zeier	Yugoslav Sportswoman of the Year; 1960; 1962	Succeeded by Hilda Zeier; Natalija Stefanović
