= Thelma Hopkins (athlete) =

Northern Irish athlete (1936–2025)

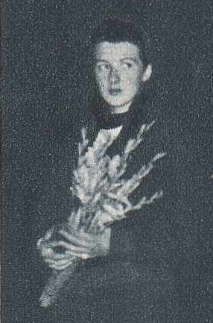
- Hopkins in 1955

Personal information
- Full name: Thelma Elizabeth Hopkins
- Nationality: British
- Born: 16 March 1936 Kingston upon Hull, East Riding of Yorkshire, England
- Died: 10 January 2025 (aged 88) Edmonton, Alberta, Canada
- Height: 170 cm (5 ft 7 in)
- Weight: 66 kg (146 lb)

Sport
- Sport: Athletics
- Event: high jump / long jump
- Club: Queen's University Belfast
Medal record
Women's athletics
Representing Great Britain
Olympic Games
| Silver medal – second place | 1956 Melbourne | High jump |
European Championships
| Gold medal – first place | 1954 Bern | High jump |
Summer Universiade
| Bronze medal – third place | 1961 Sofia | High jump |
Representing Northern Ireland
British Empire and Commonwealth Games
| Gold medal – first place | 1954 Vancouver | High jump |
| Silver medal – second place | 1954 Vancouver | Long jump |

Thelma Elizabeth Hopkins (16 March 1936 – 10 January 2025) was a Northern Irish athlete who competed in the high jump and the long jump. She won the high jump silver medal at the 1956 Melbourne Olympics and was European champion in 1954.

== Biography ==
Hopkins was born in Kingston upon Hull but grew up in Belfast as a child; she had one older sister.

Hopkins finished third behind Dorothy Tyler in the high jump event at the 1952 WAAA Championships.

At both the 1953 WAAA Championships and 1954 WAAA Championships she was defeated by Sheila Lerwill in the high jump competition.

In the 1954 Commonwealth Games she won a gold medal for Northern Ireland in high jump. Later that year, she got the gold medal in high jump for Great Britain at the 1954 European Athletics Championships.

Hopkins became a double British champion in 1955, winning the national high jump title and national long jump title at the 1955 WAAA Championships.

On 5 May 1956, Hopkins set a new world high jump record with a leap of 1.74 metres in Belfast, erasing the mark of 1.73 metres set by Aleksandra Chudina of the USSR on 22 May 1954. Her record was broken on 14 July 1956 in Bucharest by Iolanda Balaș of Romania. Olympic gold medallist Mary Peters called Hopkins her "inspiration". Coached by Franz Stampfl, she competed for Great Britain in the 1956 Summer Olympics held in Melbourne, Australia in high jump, where she jointly won the silver medal with Mariya Pisareva.

Hopkins completed another double of national championships when winning the 80 metres hurdles and high jump at the 1957 WAAA Championships.

As well as athletics she excelled at hockey where she was a regular choice for the Ireland women's national field hockey team, playing at forward and winning 40 caps. She also represented Ireland as an international squash player.

She was one of many signatories in a letter to The Times on 17 July 1958 opposing 'the policy of apartheid' in international sport and defending 'the principle of racial equality which is embodied in the Declaration of the Olympic Games'.

Hopkins moved to Canada, where she died on 10 January 2025, at the age of 88 in Edmonton.

Her achievement in breaking the world record is commemorated by a plaque erected by Belfast City Council in 2006 in Cherryvale Playing Fields, South Belfast.

Records
| Preceded by (England) Sheila Lerwill | Women's High Jump British Record Holder; 5 May 1956 – 15 August 1964 | Succeeded by (England) Frances Slaap |
