= Valentina Ballod =

Uzbekistani athlete

Personal information
- Nationality: Uzbekistani
- Born: 1 July 1937 Samarkand, Uzbek SSR, Soviet Union
- Died: 23 March 2014 (aged 76)

Sport
- Sport: Athletics
- Event: High jump
Medal record
Representing Soviet Union
Summer Universiade
Silver medal – second place	1959 Turin	High jump

Valentina Aleksandrovna Ballod (née Lebedinskaya, 1 July 1937 – 23 March 2014) was an Uzbekistani athlete. She competed in the women's high jump at the 1956 Summer Olympics and the 1960 Summer Olympics, representing the Soviet Union.
