= Athletics at the 1958 British Empire and Commonwealth Games – Women's 4 × 110 yards relay =

Women's 4 × 110 yards relay at the Commonwealth Games

The women's 4 × 110 yards relay event at the 1958 British Empire and Commonwealth Games was held on 26 July at the Cardiff Arms Park in Cardiff, Wales.

The Welsh team were denied a place in the final after being disqualified following an illegal baton change.

== Medalists ==
Gold	Silver	Bronze
England; Heather Young; June Paul; Dorothy Hyman; Madeleine Weston	Australia; Betty Cuthbert; Kay Johnson; Wendy Hayes; Marlene Mathews-Willard	Canada; Diane Matheson; Eleanor Haslam; Maureen Rever; Freyda Berman

== Results ==
=== Heats ===
Qualification: First 3 teams of each heat (Q) qualified directly for the final.

Rank	Heat	Nation	Athletes	Time	Notes
1	1	Australia	Betty Cuthbert, Kay Johnson, Wendy Hayes, Marlene Mathews-Willard	46.6	Q, GR
2	1	Canada	Diane Matheson, Eleanor Haslam, Maureen Rever, Freyda Berman	47.4	Q
3	1	Northern Ireland	Thelma Hopkins, Bridget Robinson, Mary Peters, Maeve Kyle	50.1	Q
	1	Wales	Bronwen Jones, Ellen Grainger, Gwyneth Lewis, Jean Whitehead	DQ	
1	2	England	Heather Young, June Paul, Dorothy Hyman, Madeleine Weston	46.1	Q, GR
2	2	New Zealand	Marise Chamberlain, Margaret Stuart, Beverly Weigel, Jessica Donaghy	48.2	Q
3	2	Scotland	Doris Tyndall, Moira Campbell, Isabel Bond, Mary Symon	48.3	Q
4	2	Nigeria	Olu Onwuchekwa, Esther Ogbeni, Violet Odogwu, Folashade Payne	49.6	

=== Final ===
Rank	Lane	Nation	Athletes	Time	Notes
1st place, gold medalist(s)	4	England	Heather Young, June Paul, Dorothy Hyman, Madeleine Weston	45.37	WR
2nd place, silver medalist(s)	5	Australia	Betty Cuthbert, Kay Johnson, Wendy Hayes, Marlene Mathews-Willard	46.12	
3rd place, bronze medalist(s)	3	Canada	Diane Matheson, Eleanor Haslam, Maureen Rever, Freyda Berman	47.21	
4	6	New Zealand	Marise Chamberlain, Margaret Stuart, Beverly Weigel, Jessica Donaghy	48.3	
5	2	Scotland	Doris Tyndall, Moira Campbell, Isabel Bond, Mary Symon	48.5	
6	1	Northern Ireland	Thelma Hopkins, Bridget Robinson, Mary Peters, Maeve Kyle	50.3	
