= Athletics at the 1958 British Empire and Commonwealth Games – Women's 100 yards =

Women's 100 yards at the Commonwealth Games

The women's 100 yards event at the 1958 British Empire and Commonwealth Games was held on 19 and 22 July at the Cardiff Arms Park in Cardiff, Wales.

== Medalists ==
Gold	Silver	Bronze
Marlene Mathews-Willard; Australia	Heather Young; England	Madeleine Weston; England

== Results ==
=== Heats ===
Qualification: First 2 in each heat (Q) qualify directly for the semifinals.

Wind:
Heat 1: -0.3, Heat 2: 0.0 m/s, Heat 3: +0.3, Heat 4: ? m/s, Heat 5: ?, Heat 6: 0.0 m/s

Rank	Heat	Name	Nationality	Time	Notes
1	1	Betty Cuthbert	Australia	10.8	Q
2	1	Dorothy Hyman	England	11.0	Q
3	1	Eleanor Haslam	Canada	11.1	
4	1	Bronwen Jones	Wales	11.4	
5	1	Alix Jamieson	Scotland	11.5	
6	1	Folashade Payne	Nigeria	11.5	
1	2	Marlene Mathews-Willard	Australia	10.9	Q
2	2	Margaret Stuart	New Zealand	11.3	Q
3	2	Mary Symon	Scotland	11.5	
4	2	Freyda Berman	Canada	11.5	
5	2	Claudette Masdammer	British Guiana	11.6	
1	3	June Paul	England	10.7	Q, =GR
2	3	Kay Johnson	Australia	11.1	Q
3	3	Marise Chamberlain	New Zealand	11.4	
4	3	Jean Whitehead	Wales	11.4	
5	3	Doris Tyndall	Scotland	11.4	
6	3	Helen Quartey-Papafio	Ghana	11.7	
1	4	Heather Young	England	10.7	Q, =GR
2	4	Magdalena Myburgh	South Africa	11.0	Q
3	4	Maureen Rever	Canada	11.2	
4	4	Stephanie D'Souza	India	12.0	
	4	Elizabeth Bright	Sierra Leone	DQ	
1	5	Madeleine Weston	England	11.0	Q
2	5	Edith Shaw	South Africa	11.0	Q
3	5	Esther Ogbeni	Nigeria	11.4	
4	5	Gwyneth Lewis	Wales	11.4	
5	5	Daisy Williams	Sierra Leone	11.6	
1	6	Wendy Hayes	Australia	11.0	Q
2	6	Moira Campbell	Scotland	11.4	Q
3	6	Maeve Kyle	Northern Ireland	11.4	
4	6	Beverly Weigel	New Zealand	11.4	
5	6	Beryl Turner	Wales	11.9	

=== Semifinals ===
Qualification: First 3 in each heat (Q) qualify directly for the final.

Wind:
Heat 1: 0.0, Heat 2: +2.3 m/s

Rank	Heat	Name	Nationality	Time	Notes
1	1	Madeleine Weston	England	10.9	Q
2	1	Elizabeth Cuthbert	Australia	10.9	Q
3	1	June Paul	England	10.9	Q
4	1	Wendy Hayes	Australia	10.9	
5	1	Magdalena Myburgh	South Africa	10.9	
6	1	Margaret Stuart	New Zealand	11.1	
1	2	Marlene Mathews-Willard	Australia	10.7	Q
2	2	Heather Young	England	10.9	Q
3	2	Edith Shaw	South Africa	11.0	Q
4	2	Dorothy Hyman	England	11.1	
5	2	Moira Campbell	Scotland	11.3	
6	2	Kay Johnson	Australia	11.6	

=== Final ===
Wind: +0.3 m/s

Rank	Lane	Name	Nationality	Time	Notes
1st place, gold medalist(s)	1	Marlene Mathews-Willard	Australia	10.70	GR
2nd place, silver medalist(s)	2	Heather Young	England	10.73	
3rd place, bronze medalist(s)	3	Madeleine Weston	England	10.81	
4	4	Elizabeth Cuthbert	Australia	10.84	
5	5	June Paul	England	10.8	
6	6	Edith Shaw	South Africa	11.0	
