= Canada at the 1956 Summer Olympics =

- IOC code: CAN
- NOC: Canadian Olympic Committee

in Melbourne/Stockholm
- Competitors: 92 (77 men and 15 women) in 14 sports
- Flag bearer: Robert Steckle
- Medals Ranked 15th: Gold 2 Silver 1 Bronze 3 Total 6

Summer Olympics appearances (overview)
- 1900; 1904; 1908; 1912; 1920; 1924; 1928; 1932; 1936; 1948; 1952; 1956; 1960; 1964; 1968; 1972; 1976; 1980; 1984; 1988; 1992; 1996; 2000; 2004; 2008; 2012; 2016; 2020; 2024

Other related appearances
- 1906 Intercalated Games

Canada competed at the 1956 Summer Olympics in Melbourne, Australia and Stockholm, Sweden (equestrian events). 92 competitors, 77 men and 15 women, took part in 81 events in 14 sports.

== Medallists ==
=== Gold ===
- Archibald MacKinnon, Kenneth Loomer, Walter D'Hondt, and Donald Arnold in Rowing, men's Coxless Four
- Gerald Ouellette in Shooting, men's 50m Rifle Prone

=== Silver ===
- Philip Kueber, Richard McClure, Robert Wilson, David Helliwell, Wayne Pretty, Bill McKerlich, Douglas McDonald, Lawrence West, Carlton Ogawa – Rowing, men's eight with coxswain

=== Bronze ===
- Irene MacDonald – Diving, women's 3m springboard
- Stuart Boa – Shooting, men's 50m Rifle Prone
- John Rumble, James Elder, Brian Herbinson – Equestrian, Team Three-Day Event

== Athletics ==
Key

- Note–Ranks given for track events are within the athlete's heat only
- Q = Qualified for the next round

Men
Track & road events

Athlete	Event	Heat		Quarterfinal		Semifinal		Final	
Athlete	Event	Result	Rank	Result	Rank	Result	Rank	Result	Rank
Jack Parrington	100 m	11.62	5	Did not advance					
Stan Levenson	100 m	10.94	1 Q	10.93	3 Q	10.94	5	Did not advance	
Dick Harding	100 m	11.20	3	Did not advance					
Stan Levenson	200 m	DNS		Did not advance					
Joseph Foreman	200 m	22.28	4	Did not advance					
Jack Parrington	200 m	22.61	5	Did not advance					
Murray Cockburn	400 m	49.0	2 Q	49.5	6	Did not advance			
Terry Tobacco	400 m	47.9	1 Q	47.7	4	Did not advance			
Laird Sloan	400 m	50.0	4	Did not advance					
Murray Cockburn	800 m	DNS		—N/a		Did not advance			
Doug Clement	800 m	1:56.92	8	—N/a		Did not advance			
Douglas Kyle	5000 m	14:59.0	21	—N/a				Did not advance	
Douglas Kyle	10,000 m	—N/a						31:21.0	23
Stanley Levenson; Richard Harding; John Parrington; Joseph Foreman	4 × 100 m relay	41.7	12	—N/a		Did not advance			
Laird Sloan; Douglas Clement; Murray Cockburn; Terry Tobacco	4 × 400 m relay	3:10.6	4 Q	—N/a				3:10.2	5
Alexander Oakley	20 km walk	—N/a						DNF	

Field events

Athlete	Event	Qualification		Final	
Athlete	Event	Result	Rank	Result	Rank
Ken Money	High jump	1.92	17 Q	2.03	5

Women
Track & road events

Athlete	Event	Heat		Semifinal		Final	
Athlete	Event	Result	Rank	Result	Rank	Result	Rank
Maureen Rever	100 m	12.2	5	Did not advance			
Diane Matheson	100 m	12.4	6	Did not advance			
Eleanor Haslam	100 m	11.8	4	Did not advance			
Diane Matheson	200 m	25.7	3	Did not advance			
Eleanor Haslam	200 m	25.3	4	Did not advance			
Maureen Rever	200 m	26.1	5	Did not advance			
Eleanor Haslam; Dorothy Kozak; Diane Matheson; Maureen Rever	4 × 100 m relay	46.6	9	—N/a		Did not advance	

Field events

Athlete	Event	Qualification		Final	
Athlete	Event	Result	Rank	Result	Rank
Dorothy Kozak	Long jump	5.50	17	Did not advance	
Maureen Rever	Long jump	DNS		Did not advance	
Alice Whitty	High jump	1.58	16 Q	1.55	16
Jackie MacDonald	Shot put	13.11	13 Q	14.31	10
Jackie MacDonald	Discus throw	40.41	19	Did not advance	
Margaret George	Javelin throw	39.73	16	Did not advance	

== Cycling ==
Sprint

- Fred Markus – 17th place

Time trial

- James Davies – 1:15.2 (→ 17th place)

Individual road race

- Patrick Murphy – 5:27:28 (→ 29th place)
- Fred Markus – did not finish (→ no ranking)
- James Davies – did not finish (→ no ranking)

== Diving ==
Men

Athlete	Event	Preliminary		Final			
Athlete	Event	Points	Rank	Points	Rank	Total	Rank
William Patrick	3 m springboard	75.64	11 Q	51.68	10	127.32	=10
William Patrick	10 m platform	67.71	15	Did not advance			

Women

Athlete	Event	Preliminary		Final			
Athlete	Event	Points	Rank	Points	Rank	Total	Rank
Irene MacDonald	3 m springboard	73.25	2 Q	48.15	5	121.40	3rd place, bronze medalist(s)

== Fencing ==
One fencer represented Canada in 1956.

Men's foil

- Roland Asselin

Men's épée

- Roland Asselin

Men's sabre

- Roland Asselin

== Rowing ==
Canada had 13 male rowers participate in two out of seven rowing events in 1956.

Men's coxless four

- Archibald MacKinnon
- Lorne Loomer
- Walter D'Hondt
- Donald Arnold

Men's eight

- Philip Kueber
- Richard McClure
- Robert Wilson
- David Helliwell
- Wayne Pretty
- Bill McKerlich
- Douglas McDonald
- Lawrence West
- Carlton Ogawa (cox)

== Shooting ==
Five shooters represented Canada in 1956. In the 50 m rifle, prone event, Gerald Ouellette won gold and Gil Boa won bronze.

25 m pistol

- James Zavitz

50 m pistol

- James Zavitz

300 m rifle, three positions

- Gerald Ouellette

50 m rifle, three positions

- Gil Boa
- Gerald Ouellette

50 m rifle, prone

- Gil Boa
- Gerald Ouellette

Trap

- Earl Caldwell
- Frank Opsal

== Swimming ==
Men

Athlete	Event	Heat		Semifinal		Final	
Athlete	Event	Time	Rank	Time	Rank	Time	Rank
George Park	100 m freestyle	58.8	17	Did not advance			
William Slater	400 m freestyle	4:40.4	12	—N/a		Did not advance	
William Slater	1500 m freestyle	18:51.6	8 Q	—N/a		18:38.1	5
George Park	200 m butterfly	2:47.2	15	—N/a		Did not advance	

Women

Athlete	Event	Heat		Semifinal		Final	
Athlete	Event	Time	Rank	Time	Rank	Time	Rank
Virginia Grant	100 m freestyle	1:05.1	=4 Q	1:05.5	=5 Q	1:05.4	5
Helen Stewart	100 m freestyle	1:07.1	=12 Q	1:06.9	=14	Did not advance	
Gladys Priestley	400 m freestyle	5:27.5	21	—N/a		Did not advance	
Beth Whittall	400 m freestyle	5:21.7	15	—N/a		Did not advance	
Sara Barber	100 m backstroke	1:14.3	4 Q	—N/a		1:14.3	7
Lenora Fisher	100 m backstroke	1:17.5	=18	—N/a		Did not advance	
Sara Barber	100 m butterfly	1:16.2	6 Q	—N/a		1:18.4	8
Beth Whittall	100 m butterfly	1:16.9	7 Q	—N/a		1:17.9	7
Helen Stewart; Gladys Priestley; Sara Barber; Virginia Grant	4 × 100 m freestyle	4:29.3	6 Q	—N/a		4:28.3	5
