= Athletics at the 1958 British Empire and Commonwealth Games – Women's 220 yards =

Women's 220 yards at the Commonwealth Games

The women's 220 yards event at the 1958 British Empire and Commonwealth Games was held on 22 and 24 July at the Cardiff Arms Park in Cardiff, Wales.

== Medalists ==
| Gold | Silver | Bronze |
|---|---|---|
| Marlene Mathews-Willard; Australia | Betty Cuthbert; Australia | Heather Young; England |

== Results ==
=== Heats ===
Qualification: First 2 in each heat (Q) qualify directly for the semifinals.

| Rank | Heat | Name | Nationality | Time | Notes |
|---|---|---|---|---|---|
| 1 | 1 | Betty Cuthbert | Australia | 24.5 | Q |
| 2 | 1 | Maureen Rever | Canada | 25.4 | Q |
| 3 | 1 | Alix Jamieson | Scotland | 26.0 | |
| 4 | 1 | Daphne Howard-Williams | Wales | 27.5 | |
| | 1 | Claudette Masdammer | British Guiana | DNF | |
| 1 | 2 | Marlene Mathews-Willard | Australia | 24.3 | Q |
| 2 | 2 | Moyra Hiscox | England | 24.6 | Q |
| 3 | 2 | Doris Tyndall | Scotland | 25.2 | |
| 4 | 2 | Maeve Kyle | Northern Ireland | 25.7 | |
| 5 | 2 | Folashade Payne | Nigeria | 26.2 | |
| 1 | 3 | June Paul | England | 24.7 | Q |
| 2 | 3 | Freyda Berman | Canada | 25.7 | Q |
| 3 | 3 | Gwyneth Lewis | Wales | 26.5 | |
| 4 | 3 | Daisy Williams | Sierra Leone | 27.4 | |
| 1 | 4 | Marianne Dew | England | 24.4 | Q |
| 2 | 4 | Edith Shaw | South Africa | 24.7 | Q |
| 3 | 4 | Jean Whitehead | Wales | 25.2 | |
| 4 | 4 | Elizabeth Bright | Sierra Leone | 27.8 | |
| 1 | 5 | Eleanor Haslam | Canada | 24.4 | Q |
| 2 | 5 | Magdalena Myburgh | South Africa | 24.7 | Q |
| 3 | 5 | Moira Campbell | Scotland | 25.4 | |
| 4 | 5 | Stephanie D'Souza | India | 26.2 | |
| 1 | 6 | Heather Young | England | 24.7 | Q |
| 2 | 6 | Marise Chamberlain | New Zealand | 25.8 | Q |
| 3 | 6 | Isabel Bond | Scotland | 26.2 | |
| 4 | 6 | Jacqueline Barnett | Wales | 27.0 | |

=== Semifinals ===
Qualification: First 3 in each heat (Q) qualify directly for the final.

| Rank | Heat | Name | Nationality | Time | Notes |
|---|---|---|---|---|---|
| 1 | 1 | Betty Cuthbert | Australia | 24.0 | Q |
| 2 | 1 | Heather Young | England | 24.1 | Q |
| 3 | 1 | Magdalena Myburgh | South Africa | 24.5 | Q |
| 4 | 1 | Freyda Berman | Canada | 26.0 | |
| | 1 | Marianne Dew | England | DQ | |
| | 1 | Marise Chamberlain | New Zealand | DNS | |
| 1 | 2 | Marlene Mathews-Willard | Australia | 24.0 | Q |
| 2 | 2 | June Paul | England | 24.1 | Q |
| 3 | 2 | Eleanor Haslam | Canada | 24.1 | Q |
| 4 | 2 | Moyra Hiscox | England | 24.9 | |
| 5 | 2 | Edith Shaw | South Africa | 25.1 | |
| 6 | 2 | Maureen Rever | Canada | 25.3 | |

=== Final ===
| Rank | Name | Nationality | Time | Notes |
|---|---|---|---|---|
| 1st place, gold medalist(s) | Marlene Mathews-Willard | Australia | 23.65 | GR |
| 2nd place, silver medalist(s) | Betty Cuthbert | Australia | 23.77 | |
| 3rd place, bronze medalist(s) | Heather Young | England | 23.9 | |
| 4 | June Paul | England | 24.0 | |
| 5 | Magdalena Myburgh | South Africa | 24.4 | |
| 6 | Eleanor Haslam | Canada | 24.7 | |
