= Athletics at the 1958 British Empire and Commonwealth Games – Women's 80 metres hurdles =

Women's 80 metres hurdles at the Commonwealth Games

The women's 80 metres hurdles event at the 1958 British Empire and Commonwealth Games was held on 24 and 26 July at the Cardiff Arms Park in Cardiff, Wales.

== Medalists ==
Gold	Silver	Bronze
Norma Thrower; Australia	Carole Quinton; England	Gloria Cooke-Wigney; Australia

== Results ==
=== Heats ===
Qualification: First 2 in each heat (Q) qualify directly for the final.

Rank	Heat	Name	Nationality	Time	Notes
1	1	Norma Thrower	Australia	10.9	Q
2	1	Margaret Stuart	New Zealand	11.1	Q
3	1	Florette Iyo	Nigeria	12.3	
4	1	Jestina Ashwood	Sierra Leone	13.0	
1	2	Heather Young	England	11.2	Q
2	2	Wendy Hayes	Australia	11.2	Q
3	2	Sheila Lewis	Wales	11.8	
4	2	Beverley Watson	Australia	11.8	
1	3	Gloria Cooke-Wigney	Australia	11.1	Q
2	3	Carole Quinton	England	11.2	Q
3	3	Carol Thomas	Wales	11.6	
4	3	Helen Quartey-Papafio	Ghana	11.8	

=== Final ===
Wind: +4.9 m/s

Rank	Lane	Name	Nationality	Time	Notes
1st place, gold medalist(s)	1	Norma Thrower	Australia	10.72w	
2nd place, silver medalist(s)	3	Carole Quinton	England	10.77w	
3rd place, bronze medalist(s)	4	Gloria Cooke-Wigney	Australia	10.94w	
4	6	Margaret Stuart	New Zealand	11.0w	
5	5	Wendy Hayes	Australia	11.21w	
6	2	Heather Young	England	11.3w	
