= Athletics at the 1957 World University Games – Women's 4 × 100 metres relay =

The women's 4 × 100 metres relay event at the 1957 World University Games was held at the Stadium Charlety in Paris on 8 September 1957.

== Results ==
Rank	Nation	Athletes	Time	Notes
1st place, gold medalist(s)	Soviet Union	Vera Krepkina, Nina Dyeonskaya, Mariya Itkina, Galina Popova	46.4	
2nd place, silver medalist(s)	West Germany	Christiane Voß, Inge Fuhrmann, Irene Brütting, Hilke Thymm	47.4	
3rd place, bronze medalist(s)	Italy	Elisabetta Mattana, Giuseppina Leone, Franca Peggion, Anna Doro	49.0	
4	Great Britain	Helen Mason, Jean Whitehead, Bonner, Margaret Francis	51.1	
