= Athletics at the 1956 Summer Olympics – Women's 100 metres =

Women's 100 metres at the Games of the XVI Olympiad
- Venue: Melbourne Cricket Ground
- Date: November 24th, 1956 (heats & semifinals); November 26th, 1956 (final)
- Competitors: 34 from 18 nations
- Winning time: 11.5

Medalists
1st place, gold medalist(s)		Betty Cuthbert	Australia
2nd place, silver medalist(s)		Christa Stubnick	United Team of Germany
3rd place, bronze medalist(s)		Marlene Mathews-Willard	Australia

Video on YouTube Official Video @16:22

The women's 100 metres competition at the 1956 Summer Olympics in Melbourne, Australia was held at the Olympic Stadium on November 29–30.

In the final, Betty Cuthbert clearly beat her teammate Marlene Mathews-Willard out of the blocks, with Heather Armitage and Isabelle Daniels out quickly in close contention. Christa Stubnick had a burst of acceleration to quickly draw even with Daniels as Armitage was unable to hold her speed. Cuthbert expanded upon her slight advantage to pull away to a clear win. Stubnick was able to separate slightly from Daniels with Mathews-Willard steadily gaining from the back. Mathews-Willard caught Daniels and almost nipped Stubnick, clearly the fastest moving athlete at the finish.

== Competition format ==
The women's 100 metres competition started with six heats, where the fastest two from each heat qualified to one of the two semifinals groups. The three fastest runners from each semifinals group advanced to the final.

== Records ==
Prior to the competition, the existing World and Olympic records were as follows.

World record	Shirley Strickland (AUS)	11.3	Warsaw, Poland	August 4, 1955
Olympic record	Helen Stephens (USA)	11.5	Berlin, Germany	August 4, 1936

== Results ==
=== Heats ===
==== Heat 1 ====
Wind: +1.3 m/s

Rank	Athlete	Country	Time (hand)	Time (automatic)	Notes
1	Giuseppina Leone	Italy	11.8	12.00	Q
2	Vira Kalashnykova-Krepkina	Soviet Union	11.9	12.08	Q
3	Mae Faggs	United States	12.2	12.36	
4	Micheline Fluchot	France	12.4	12.55	
5	Janet Jesudason	Singapore	13.2	13.41	
—	Mary Rao	India	DNF	–	

==== Heat 2 ====
Wind: +0.6 m/s

Rank	Athlete	Country	Time (hand)	Time (automatic)	Notes
1	Marlene Mathews-Willard	Australia	11.5	11.81	Q, OR
2	Galina Rezchikova	Soviet Union	11.8	12.11	Q
3	Lucinda Williams	United States	12.0	12.14	
4	Maria Kusion-Bibro	Poland	12.2	12.34	
5	Maureen Rever	Canada	12.2	12.36	
6	Franca Peggion	Italy	12.4	12.55	
7	Mary Klass	Singapore	12.6	12.57	

==== Heat 3 ====
Wind: -1.2 m/s

Rank	Athlete	Country	Time (hand)	Time (automatic)	Notes
1	Betty Cuthbert	Australia	11.4	11.72	Q, OR
2	Isabelle Daniels	United States	11.6	11.91	Q
3	Anne Pashley	Great Britain	11.7	11.94	
4	Barbara Janiszewska	Poland	12.2	12.37	
5	Maria Musso	Italy	12.2	12.40	
6	Diane Matheson	Canada	12.4	12.59	

==== Heat 4 ====
Wind: +2.4 m/s

Rank	Athlete	Country	Time (hand)	Time (automatic)	Notes
1	Heather Armitage	Great Britain	11.5	11.81	Q
2	Gisela Birkemeyer	United Team of Germany	11.7	11.85	Q
3	Shirley Strickland	Australia	11.7	11.86	
4	Eleanor Haslam	Canada	11.8	11.98	
5	Halina Górecka	Poland	12.2	12.38	
6	Maeve Kyle	Ireland	12.3	12.48	

==== Heat 5 ====
Wind: +3.5 m/s

Rank	Athlete	Country	Time (hand)	Time (automatic)	Notes
1	Galina Popova	Soviet Union	11.6	11.86	Q
2	Catherine Capdevielle	France	11.7	12.10	Q
3	Inge Fuhrmann	United Team of Germany	12.2	12.31	
4	Annie Choong	Malaya	12.5	12.73	
—	Bertha Díaz	Cuba	DNS	–	
—	Francisca Sañopal	Philippines	DNS	–	

==== Heat 6 ====
Wind: -4.0 m/s

Rank	Athlete	Country	Time (hand)	Time (automatic)	Notes
1	Christa Stubnick	United Team of Germany	11.7	11.89	Q
2	June Foulds	Great Britain	11.9	12.15	Q
3	Margaret Stuart	New Zealand	12.3	12.38	
4	Elaine Winter	South Africa	12.5	12.59	
5	Claudette Masdammer	Guyana	12.7	12.87	
—	Manolita Cinco	Philippines	DNS	–	

=== Semifinals ===
==== Semifinal 1 ====
Wind: -4.0 m/s

Rank	Athlete	Country	Time (hand)	Time (automatic)	Notes
1	Christa Stubnick	United Team of Germany	11.9	12.05	Q
2	Betty Cuthbert	Australia	12.0	12.08	Q
3	Giuseppina Leone	Italy	12.1	12.22	Q
4	June Foulds	Great Britain	12.1	12.24	
5	Galina Popova	Soviet Union	12.2	12.34	
6	Catherine Capdevielle	France	12.4	12.53	

==== Semifinal 2 ====
Wind: 0.0 m/s

Rank	Athlete	Country	Time (hand)	Time (automatic)	Notes
1	Marlene Mathews-Willard	Australia	11.6	11.80	Q
2	Heather Armitage	Great Britain	11.6	11.87	Q
3	Isabelle Daniels	United States	11.7	11.94	Q
4	Gisela Birkemeyer	United Team of Germany	11.9	12.07	
5	Vira Kalashnykova-Krepkina	Soviet Union	11.9	12.07	
6	Galina Reshchikova	Soviet Union	12.1	12.23	

=== Final ===
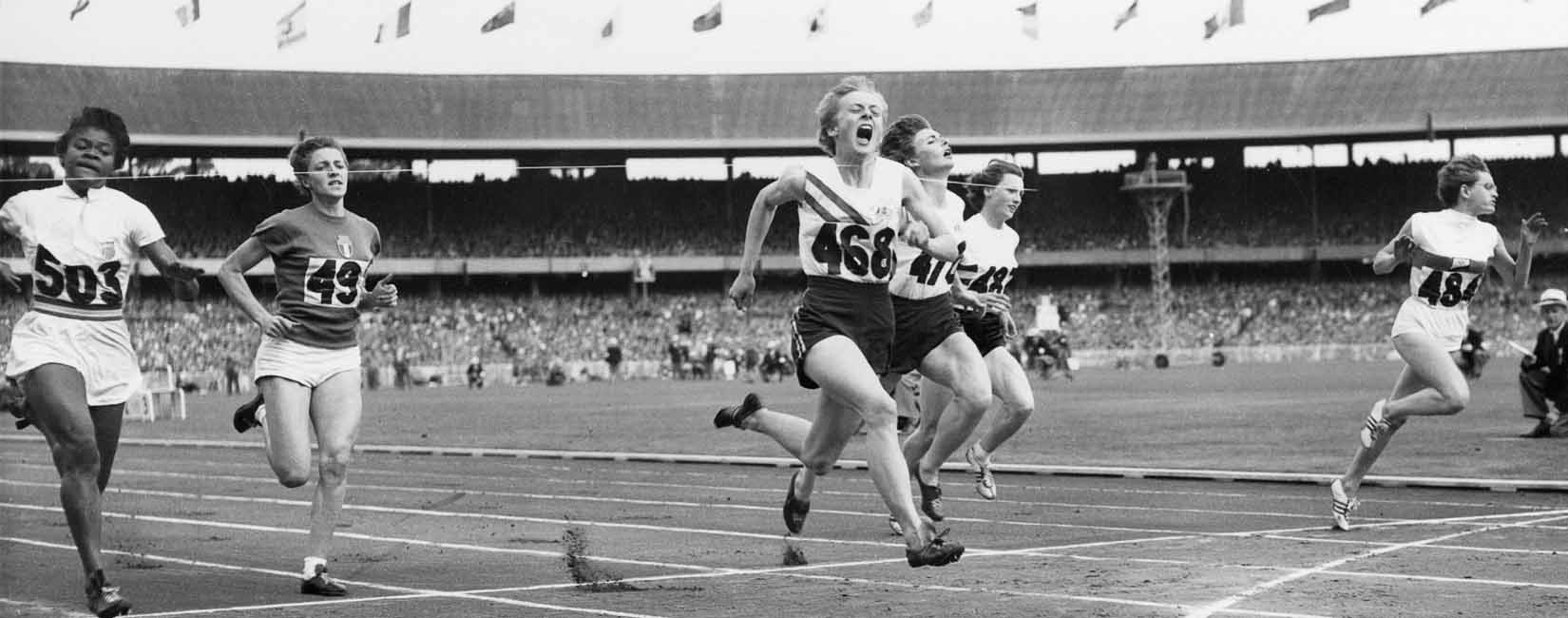
Left-right: Isabelle Daniels, Giuseppina Leone, Betty Cuthbert, Marlene Mathews, Heather Armitage, Christa Stubnick

Wind: -2.3 m/s

Rank	Athlete	Country	Time (hand)	Time (automatic)	Notes
1st place, gold medalist(s)	Betty Cuthbert	Australia	11.5	11.82	
2nd place, silver medalist(s)	Christa Stubnick	United Team of Germany	11.7	11.92	
3rd place, bronze medalist(s)	Marlene Mathews-Willard	Australia	11.7	11.94	
4	Isabelle Daniels	United States	11.8	11.98	
5	Giuseppina Leone	Italy	11.9	12.07	
6	Heather Armitage	Great Britain	12.0	12.10	
