= Athletics at the 1958 British Empire and Commonwealth Games – Women's shot put =

Women's shot put at the Commonwealth Games

The women's shot put event at the 1958 British Empire and Commonwealth Games was held on 19 July at the Cardiff Arms Park in Cardiff, Wales.

== Results ==
Rank	Name	Nationality	Result	Notes
1st place, gold medalist(s)	Val Sloper	New Zealand	51 ft 0 in (15.54 m)	
2nd place, silver medalist(s)	Suzanne Allday	England	47 ft 4 3/4 in (14.45 m)	
3rd place, bronze medalist(s)	Jackie Gelling	Canada	46 ft 0 1/2 in (14.03 m)	
4	Magdalena Swanepoel	South Africa	43 ft 2 3/4 in (13.18 m)	
5	Jennifer Thompson	New Zealand	41 ft 11 1/2 in (12.79 m)	
6	Iris Mouzer	England	40 ft 8 1/2 in (12.41 m)	
7	Josephine Cook	England	40 ft 4 in (12.29 m)	
8	Mary Peters	Northern Ireland	36 ft 9 1/4 in (11.21 m)	
9	Edith Okoli	Nigeria	32 ft 0 in (9.754 m)	
	Anna Pazera	Australia	DNS	
	Marie Dupree	Canada	DNS	
