= Athletics at the 1957 World University Games – Women's 100 metres =

The women's 100 metres event at the 1957 World University Games was held at the Stadium Charlety in Paris on 5 and 6 September 1957.

== Medalists ==
Gold	Silver	Bronze
Vera Krepkina; Soviet Union	Galina Popova; Soviet Union	Giuseppina Leone; Italy

== Results ==
=== Heats ===
Rank	Heat	Athlete	Nationality	Time	Notes
1	1	Galina Popova	Soviet Union	12.2	Q
2	1	Inge Fuhrmann	West Germany	12.3	Q
3	1	Franca Peggion	Italy	13.0	
4	1	Hannelore Poetscher	Brazil	13.4	
4	1	Bonner	Great Britain	13.4	
1	2	Vera Krepkina	Soviet Union	12.2	Q
2	2	Giuseppina Leone	Italy	12.5	Q
3	2	Christiane Voß	West Germany	12.5	
4	2	Hélène Joye	Belgium	13.8	
	2	Margaret Francis	Great Britain	DNS	
1	3	Mariya Itkina	Soviet Union	12.2	Q
2	3	Helen Mason	Great Britain	12.8	Q
3	3	Maria Kusion-Bibro	Poland	12.9	
4	3	Alessandra Taffi	Italy	13.6	

=== Final ===
Rank	Lane	Name	Nationality	Time	Notes
1st place, gold medalist(s)	3	Vera Krepkina	Soviet Union	11.8	
2nd place, silver medalist(s)	1	Galina Popova	Soviet Union	11.8	
3rd place, bronze medalist(s)	6	Giuseppina Leone	Italy	11.9	
4	4	Mariya Itkina	Soviet Union	12.1	
5	2	Inge Fuhrmann	West Germany	12.3	
6	5	Helen Mason	Great Britain	12.4	
