= Athletics at the 1957 World University Games – Women's 200 metres =

The women's 200 metres event at the 1957 World University Games was held at the Stadium Charlety in Paris on 6 and 7 September 1957.

== Medalists ==
Gold	Silver	Bronze
Mariya Itkina; Soviet Union	Nina Dyeonskaya; Soviet Union	Giuseppina Leone; Italy

== Results ==
=== Heats ===
Rank	Heat	Athlete	Nationality	Time	Notes
1	1	Nina Dyeonskaya	Soviet Union	24.8	Q
2	1	Inge Fuhrmann	West Germany	25.4	Q
3	1	Bonner	Great Britain	26.4	
4	1	Anna Doro	Italy	26.8	
1	2	Mariya Itkina	Soviet Union	25.0	Q
2	2	Helen Mason	Great Britain	25.9	Q
3	2	Maria Kusion-Bibro	Poland	26.0	
4	2	Hélène Joye	Belgium	27.0	
5	2	Franca Peggion	Italy	28.3	
1	3	Giuseppina Leone	Italy	25.0	Q
2	3	Christiane Voß	West Germany	25.4	Q
3	3	Margaret Francis	Great Britain	27.0	

=== Final ===
Rank	Lane	Name	Nationality	Time	Notes
1st place, gold medalist(s)	3	Mariya Itkina	Soviet Union	24.6	
2nd place, silver medalist(s)	2	Nina Dyeonskaya	Soviet Union	25.0	
3rd place, bronze medalist(s)	4	Giuseppina Leone	Italy	25.0	
4	1	Christiane Voß	West Germany	25.3	
5	5	Inge Fuhrmann	West Germany	25.7	
6	6	Helen Mason	Great Britain	26.5	
