= Athletics at the 1958 British Empire and Commonwealth Games – Women's javelin throw =

Women's javelin throw at the Commonwealth Games

The women's javelin throw event at the 1958 British Empire and Commonwealth Games was held on 24 July at the Cardiff Arms Park in Cardiff, Wales.

== Results ==
Rank	Name	Nationality	Result	Notes
1st place, gold medalist(s)	Anna Pazera	Australia	188 ft 4 in (57.40 m)	
2nd place, silver medalist(s)	Magdalena Swanepoel	South Africa	159 ft 10 1/2 in (48.73 m)	
3rd place, bronze medalist(s)	Averil Williams	England	153 ft 5 1/2 in (46.77 m)	
4	Sue Platt	England	148 ft 10 1/2 in (45.38 m)	
5	Margaret Callender	England	145 ft 4 1/2 in (44.31 m)	
6	Mary Tadd	England	136 ft 5 in (41.58 m)	
7	Elizabeth Davenport	India	132 ft 11 1/2 in (40.53 m)	
8	Bridget Robinson	Northern Ireland	120 ft 3 1/2 in (36.66 m)	
	Jacqueline Gelling	Canada	DNS	
