= Athletics at the 1956 Summer Olympics – Women's 80 metres hurdles =

Video on YouTube Official Video @1:05:35

The women's 80 metres hurdles was an event at the 1956 Summer Olympics in Melbourne, Australia.

== Summary ==
The Australians again qualified three women to the final. Shirley Strickland in lane 6 and Gloria Cooke in lane 1 sandwiched the field with a slight lead over the first barrier. By the second barrier, Strickland had edged ahead while Cooke was getting competition from Gisela Köhler in lane 2 next to her. By the next barrier, Köhler had some separation in second, while Galina Bystrova and Norma Thrower we battling for bronze in 4 and 5 respectively. By the seventh hurdle, Strickland had a full metre on Köhler. Almost a metre behind, Thrower had her head in front of Bystrova. In between the final flight, Bystrova edged ahead. Strickland won by almost two metres over Köhler, and behind on the run in from the last hurdle, Thrower managed to lean ahead for a microscopic advantage for bronze.

== Final classification ==
Rank	Athlete	Nation	Heat	Semi	Final
1st place, gold medalist(s)	Shirley Strickland de la Hunty	Australia	10.8	10.8	10.7
2nd place, silver medalist(s)	Gisela Köhler	United Team of Germany	11.0	10.8	10.9
3rd place, bronze medalist(s)	Norma Thrower	Australia	10.8	11.0	11.0
4	Galina Bystrova	Soviet Union	10.9	11.0	11.0
5	Maria Golubnichaya	Soviet Union	11.1	11.0	11.3
6	Gloria Cooke	Australia	11.4	11.1	11.4
—	Marthe Lambert	France	10.9	11.1	DNQ
—	Zenta Gastl-Kopp	United Team of Germany	10.9	11.1	DNQ
—	Bertha Díaz	Cuba	11.4	11.2	DNQ
—	Elaine Winter	South Africa	11.1	11.3	DNQ
—	Margaret Stuart	New Zealand	11.3	11.3	DNQ
—	Carole Quinton	Great Britain	11.4	11.4	DNQ
—	Maria Sander	United Team of Germany	11.1	DNQ	DNQ
—	Angele Picado	France	11.5	DNQ	DNQ
—	Niliya Besedina-Kulakova	Soviet Union	11.5	DNQ	DNQ
—	Barbara Mueller	United States	11.6	DNQ	DNQ
—	Francisca Sanopal	Philippines	11.8	DNQ	DNQ
—	Constance Darnowski	United States	11.9	DNQ	DNQ
—	Pauline Wainwright	Great Britain	11.9	DNQ	DNQ
—	Irene Robertson	United States	11.9	DNQ	DNQ
—	Manolita Cinco	Philippines	12.1	DNQ	DNQ
—	Milena Greppi	Italy	12.3	DNQ	DNQ
