= Athletics at the 1957 World University Games – Women's long jump =

The women's long jump event at the 1957 World University Games was held at the Stadium Charlety in Paris on 5 September 1957.

== Results ==
Rank	Name	Nationality	#1	#2	#3	#4	#5	#6	Result	Notes
1st place, gold medalist(s)	Vera Krepkina	Soviet Union	6.03	x	5.92	5.75	x	5.55	6.03	
2nd place, silver medalist(s)	Maria Ciastowska	Poland	5.84	5.43	5.71	5.63	5.93	4.63	5.93	
3rd place, bronze medalist(s)	Inge Fuhrmann	West Germany	5.72	5.67	5.72	5.61	5.83	5.74	5.83	
4	Ilsabe Heider	West Germany	5.75	x	5.55	5.80	x	5.68	5.80	
5	Galina Popova	Soviet Union	5.33	5.51	5.60	5.27	5.66	5.42	5.66	
6	Maria Kusion-Bibro	Poland	5.62	5.52	5.89	5.16	?	?	5.62	
7	Jean Whitehead	Great Britain							5.58	
8	Norsa	Italy							5.39	
9	Elisabetta Mattana	Italy							5.15	
