= Athletics at the 1957 World University Games – Men's 1500 metres =

The men's 1500 metres event at the 1957 World University Games was held at the Stadium Charlety in Paris on 6 and 8 September 1957.

== Medalists ==
Gold	Silver	Bronze
Josef Cegledi; Austria	Jonas Pipynė; Soviet Union	Harald Mengler; West Germany

== Results ==
=== Heats ===
Rank	Heat	Athlete	Nationality	Time	Notes
1	1	Jonas Pipynė	Soviet Union	3:52.5	Q
2	1	Josef Cegledi	Austria	3:53.0	Q
3	1	Harald Mengler	West Germany	3:55.0	Q
4	1	Joško Murat	Yugoslavia	3:55.8	Q
5	1	John Evans	Great Britain	3:58.5	Q
6	1	Jean-Marie Argelès	France	4:03.0	
7	1	Félix Arribas	Spain	4:10.8	
8	1	Michel Lallemand	Belgium	4:15.6	
9	1	Garo Kazandijan	Lebanon	4:35.0	
1	2	Olaf Lawrenz	West Germany	3:56.8	Q
2	2	Roger Dunkley	Great Britain	3:57.2	Q
3	2	Rudolf Klaban	Austria	3:57.6	Q
4	2	Somkutt	Hungary	3:57.8	Q
5	2	Henryk Gralewski	Poland	3:58.4	Q
6	2	André Guilhaumon	France	3:59.2	
7	2	Tadahiko Fujii	Japan	4:00.9	
8	2	Jaime Rodrigo	Spain	4:12.0	
9	2	Pérez	Spain	4:15.6	

=== Final ===
Rank	Name	Nationality	Time	Notes
1st place, gold medalist(s)	Josef Cegledi	Austria	3:50.5	
2nd place, silver medalist(s)	Jonas Pipynė	Soviet Union	3:51.0	
3rd place, bronze medalist(s)	Harald Mengler	West Germany	3:51.3	
4	Joško Murat	Yugoslavia	3:52.1	
5	Roger Dunkley	Great Britain	3:52.8	
6	John Evans	Great Britain	3:54.0	
7	Henryk Gralewski	Poland	3:55.6	
	Rudolf Klaban	Austria	?	
	Somkutt	Hungary	?	
	Olaf Lawrenz	West Germany	DNS	
