= Maria Kusion-Bibro =

Polish sprinter

Maria Bronisława Anna Kusion-Bibro-Pokorny
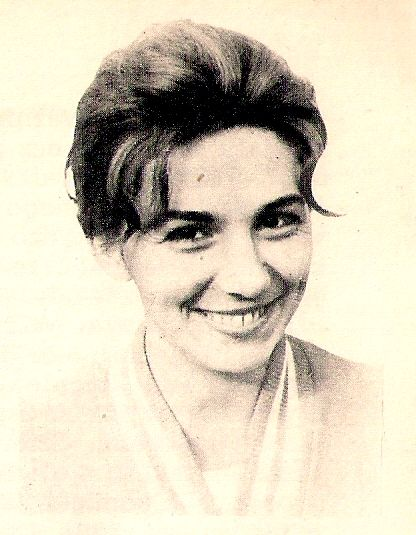
- Maria Kusion-Bibro

Personal information
- Nationality: Polish
- Born: 18 July 1936 Jurków, Poland
- Died: 9 January 1996 (aged 59) Tarnów, Poland
- Height: 1.69 m (5 ft 7 in)
- Weight: 63 kg (139 lb)

Sport
- Sport: Sprinting
- Event: 100 metres
- Club: Stal Poznań (1952); Stal Kraków (1953)); AZS Kraków (1954–1956)); Cracovia (1959–1962)
Medal record
Women's athletics
Representing Poland
European Championships
Bronze medal – third place	1958 Stockholm	4×100 m

Maria Bronisława Anna Kusion-Bibro-Pokorny (18 July 1936 – 9 January 1996) was a Polish sprinter. She competed in the women's 100 metres at the 1956 Summer Olympics.

== International competitions ==
Year	Competition	Venue	Position	Event	Notes
Representing Poland
1954	World Student Games	Budapest, Hungary	3rd	4 × 100 m relay	47.4 s
1954	World Student Games	Budapest, Hungary	2nd	Long jump	6.00 m
1954	European Championships	Bern, Switzerland	5th	4 × 100 m relay	47.1 s
1954	European Championships	Bern, Switzerland	8th	Long jump	5.63 m
1955	World Festival of Youth and Students	Warsaw, Poland	5th	100 m	11.9 s
1955	World Festival of Youth and Students	Warsaw, Poland	2nd	Long jump	5.92 m
1956	Olympic Games	Melbourne, Australia	18th (h)	100 m	12.34 s
1956	Olympic Games	Melbourne, Australia	8th (h)	4 × 100 m relay	46.58 s
1956	Olympic Games	Melbourne, Australia	9th	Long jump	5.79 m
1957	World University Games	Paris, France	8th (h)	100 m	12.9 s
1957	World University Games	Paris, France	7th (h)	200 m	26.0 s
1957	World University Games	Paris, France	6th	Long jump	5.62 m
1958	European Championships	Stockholm, Sweden	3rd	4 × 100 m relay	46.0 s
1958	European Championships	Stockholm, Sweden	6th	Pentathlon	3728 pts
1960	Olympic Games	Rome, Italy	13th	Long jump	5.86 m

== Personal bests ==
- 100 metres – 11.7h (Prague 1956)
- 200 metres – 24.4h (Budapest 1955)
- 80 metres hurdles – 11.4h (Hanover 1958)
- High jump – 1.55 (Kraków 1960)
- Long jump – 6.38 (Łódź 1961)
- Pentathlon – 4477 (Stokholm 1958)
