= Jacqueline Barnett =

Welsh athlete

Personal information
- Nationality: British (Welsh)
- Born: c. 1939 Wales

Sport
- Sport: Athletics
- Event: Sprints / 440y / middle-distance / Long jump
- Club: Chelsea College; Newport Harriers

Jacqueline Barnett also known as Jackie Barnett (born c. 1939) is a former track and field athlete from Wales, who competed at the 1958 British Empire and Commonwealth Games and the 1962 British Empire and Commonwealth Games (now Commonwealth Games).

== Biography ==
Barnett was educated at Pontllanfraith Grammar School and studied at Chelsea College and was a member of their athletics team and was also a member of the Newport Harriers Athletics Club. She won the 1955 Welsh long jump title.

In June 1957 she won a sprint treble of 100, 220 and 440 yards at the Monmouthshire Championships and in June 1958 she represented South Wales against North Wales in a warm up event before the Empire Games, finishing runner-up behind Jean Whitehead in the 220 yards event. She also finished runner-up to Whitehead in the 220 yards at the 1958 AAA Welsh championships.

She represented the 1958 Welsh team at the 1958 British Empire and Commonwealth Games in Cardiff, Wales, where she participated in one event; the 220 yards.

At the time of the Games, she was the first Welsh woman to have broken 60 seconds for 440 yards.

Barnett went to a second Commonwealth Games when she represented the 1962 Welsh team at the 1962 British Empire and Commonwealth Games in Perth, Australia, where she participated in one event; the 880 yards race.
