= Athletics at the 1957 World University Games – Men's 10,000 metres walk =

The men's 10,000 metres walk event at the 1957 World University Games was held at the Stadium Charlety in Paris on 5 September 1957. There were only two starters, both from Poland. It was the first time race walking was featured at the World University Games (future Universiade) and also the last until 1981.

== Results ==
Rank	Name	Nationality	Time	Notes
1st place, gold medalist(s)	Franciszek Szyszka	Poland	47:10.6	
2nd place, silver medalist(s)	Jerzy Łoskoczyński	Poland	49:30.2	
