= Athletics at the 1955 Summer International University Sports Week – Women's long jump =

The women's long jump event at the 1955 International University Sports Week was held in San Sebastián on 12 August 1955.

== Results ==
Rank	Name	Nationality	Result	Notes
1st place, gold medalist(s)	Friederike Harasek	Austria	5.54	
2nd place, silver medalist(s)	Ursula Schitteck	West Germany	5.48	
3rd place, bronze medalist(s)	Ilse Schauwienhold	West Germany	5.40	
4	Hilde Ostermann	West Germany	5.38	
5	L. Barr	Great Britain	5.31	
6	Milena Greppi	Italy	5.25	
7	W. Bowden	Great Britain	5.05	
8	Franca Peggion	Italy	5.00	
9	Lesley Line	Great Britain	4.82	
10	Babette Schweizer	Switzerland	4.79	
