= Sheila Lewis =

Welsh athlete

Sheila Lewis née Cox
Personal information
- Nationality: British (Welsh)
- Born: c. 1936 Wales

Sport
- Sport: Athletics
- Event: Sprints / 440y / Hurdles
- Club: Roath Harriers, Cardiff

Sheila L. Lewis née Sheila Cox (born c. 1936) is a former track and field athlete from Wales, who competed at the 1958 British Empire and Commonwealth Games (now Commonwealth Games).

== Biography ==
Lewis was a member of the Roath Harriers of Cardiff. She was a Welsh champion over 440 yards.

In June 1958 she represented South Wales against North Wales in a warm up event before the Empire Games, finishing runner-up behind Carol Thomas in the 80 metres hurdles event. She also finished runner-up to Thomas at the 1958 AAA Welsh championships.

Lewis represented the 1958 Welsh team at the 1958 British Empire and Commonwealth Games in Cardiff, Wales, where she participated in one event; the 80 metres hurdles.

At the time of the Games, she was a physical training teacher.
