= Carol Thomas (hurdler) =

Welsh athlete

Personal information
- Nationality: British (Welsh)
- Born: c. 1942 Wales

Sport
- Sport: Athletics
- Event: Sprints / Hurdles
- Club: Roath Harriers, Cardiff

Carol Mary Thomas (born c. 1942) is a former track and field athlete from Wales, who competed at the 1958 British Empire and Commonwealth Games (now Commonwealth Games).

== Biography ==
Thomas was educated at Whitchurch Grammar School and was a member of the Roath Harriers of Cardiff.

In June 1958 she represented South Wales against North Wales in a warm up event before the Empire Games, defaeting Sheila Lewis in winning the 80 metres hurdles event. She also beat Lewis in the hurdles event at the 1958 AAA Welsh championships.

She represented the 1958 Welsh team at the 1958 British Empire and Commonwealth Games in Cardiff, Wales, where she participated in one event; the 80 metres hurdles.
