= Athletics at the 1954 British Empire and Commonwealth Games – Women's javelin throw =

Women's javelin throw at the Commonwealth Games
- Venue: Empire Stadium
- Dates: 6 August

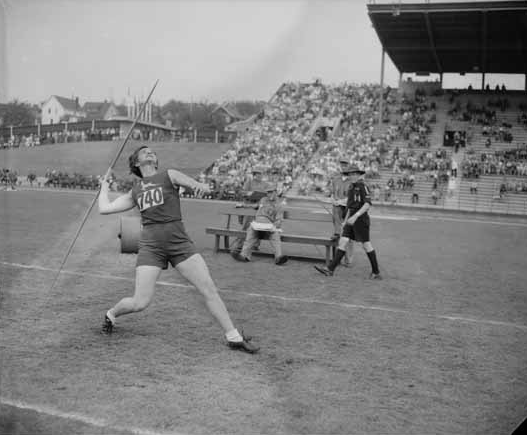
Shirley Couzens in the javelin at the games. Attribution:Province newspaper

The women's javelin throw event at the 1954 British Empire and Commonwealth Games was held on 6 August at the Empire Stadium in Vancouver, Canada.

== Results ==
Rank	Name	Nationality	Result	Notes
1st place, gold medalist(s)	Magdalena Swanepoel	South Africa	143 ft 9 1/2 in (43.83 m)	GR
2nd place, silver medalist(s)	Pearline Thornhill-Fisher	Northern Rhodesia	137 ft 8 1/2 in (41.97 m)	
3rd place, bronze medalist(s)	Shirley Couzens	Canada	127 ft 10 1/2 in (38.98 m)	
4	Mary Lawrence	Canada	115 ft 5 in (35.18 m)	
5	Dorothy Tyler	England	108 ft 0 1/2 in (32.93 m)	
6	Suzanne Allday	England	92 ft 10 in (28.30 m)	
	Helen Metchuck	Canada	DNS	
	Thelma Hopkins	Northern Ireland	DNS	
