= Beryl Turner =

Welsh athlete

Personal information
- Nationality: British (Welsh)
- Born: 1941 Anglesey, Wales

Sport
- Sport: Athletics
- Event: Sprints
- Club: Holyhead C.S.

Beryl Turner (born 1941) is a former track and field athlete from Wales, who competed at the 1958 British Empire and Commonwealth Games (now Commonwealth Games).

== Biography ==
Turner was educated at Holyhead County Secondary School and was a member of their athletics club.

She finished third behind Jean Whitehead in the 100 yards event at the 1958 AAA Welsh championships and at the North Wales AAA Championships, she was second to Daphne Howard-Williams, although both athletes broke the meeting record.

Turner represented the 1958 Welsh team at the 1958 British Empire and Commonwealth Games in Cardiff, Wales, where she participated in one event; the 100 yards.
