= Daphne Howard-Williams =

Welsh athlete

Personal information
- Nationality: British (Welsh)
- Born: c.1942 Colwyn Bay, Wales

Sport
- Sport: Athletics
- Event: Sprints
- Club: Eirias Athletics Club

Daphne Howard-Williams (born 1942) is a former track and field athlete from Wales, who competed at the 1958 British Empire and Commonwealth Games (now Commonwealth Games).

== Biography ==
Howard-Williams was educated at Colwyn Bay Grammar School and was a member of the Eirias Athletics Club.

At the 1958 North Wales AAA Championships, she won both the 100 yards and 220 yards titles, when beating Beryl Turner in the latter. She also finished runner-up behind Jean Whitehead in the 220 yards evens at the 1958 AAA Welsh championships.

She represented the 1958 Welsh team at the 1958 British Empire and Commonwealth Games in Cardiff, Wales, where she participated in one event; the 220 yards.

At the time of the Games, Williams was Welsh Secondary Schools champion and North Wales AAA record holder in 100 and 220 yards.
