= Joseph Foreman =

Joseph Foreman may refer to:

- Afroman (Joseph Edgar Foreman, born 1974), American musician
- Joe Foreman (1939–1995), Canadian sprinter
