= Bridget Robinson (javelin thrower) =

Northern Irish athlete (born c.1941)

Personal information
- Nationality: British (Northern Irish)
- Born: c.1941

Sport
- Sport: Athletics
- Event: Javlin throw / Sprints
- Club: Belfast High School; Ballymena AC

Bridget A. Robinson married name Dickson (born c.1941) is a former athlete from Northern Ireland, who represented Northern Ireland at the British Empire and Commonwealth Games (now Commonwealth Games).

== Biography ==
Robinson attended Belfast High School and was a member of their Athletics Club and while at the school broke Thelma Hopkins' Northern Ireland javelin record.

Robinson was named by the Northern Ireland AAA in the final 1958 Northern Irish Team for the forthcoming Empire and Commonwealth Games. She subsequently competed at the 1958 British Empire and Commonwealth Games in Cardiff, Wales, participating in the two athletics events; the javelin throw and the 4 x 110 yards relay race, reaching the final with Mary Peters, Maeve Kyle and Thelma Hopkins.

After leaving Belfast High School, the art student joined the Ballymena Athletics Club, where she became club captain.
