= Moira Campbell =

Scottish athlete

Personal information
- Nationality: British (Scottish)
- Born: c.1939

Sport
- Sport: Athletics
- Event: Sprints
- Club: Maryhill Harriers

Moira Campbell (born c.1939) is a former track and field athlete from Scotland who competed at the 1958 British Empire and Commonwealth Games (now Commonwealth Games).

== Biography ==
Campbell was a 100 yards Scottish Schools' champion and record holder and then attended college in Glasgow. She was a member of the Maryhill Harriers and won the 100 yards at the 1957 Scottish Western Championships, defeating Scottish champion Isabel Bond.

She represented the Scottish Empire and Commonwealth Games team at the 1958 British Empire Games in Cardiff, Wales, participating in three events, the 100 yards, the 220 yards and the 4 × 110 yards relay, with Mary Symon, Isabel Bond and Doris Tyndall.
