= Galina Rezchikova =

Soviet sprinter

Personal information
- Nationality: Soviet
- Born: 21 December 1934
- Died: 1994 (aged 59–60)

Sport
- Sport: Sprinting
- Event: 100 metres

Galina Rezchikova (21 December 1934 – 1994) was a Soviet sprinter. She competed in the women's 100 metres at the 1956 Summer Olympics.
