= Doug Clement =

Canadian sprinter (born 1933)

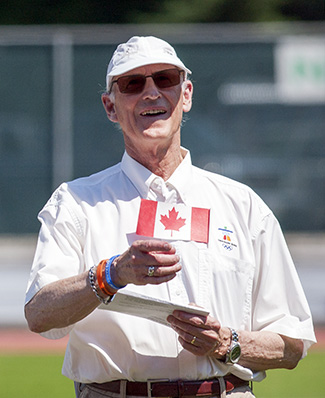
- Doug Clement in 2013

Personal information
- Born: 15 July 1933 (age 93) Montreal, Quebec, Canada

Sport
- Sport: Sprinting
- Event: 400 metres
Medal record
Men's Athletics
Representing Canada
British Empire and Commonwealth Games
Silver medal – second place	1954 Vancouver	4×440 yards relay

Doug Clement (born 15 July 1933) is a Canadian sprinter. He competed in the men's 400 metres at the 1952 Summer Olympics. He won a silver medal in the 4 x 440 yards relay at the 1954 British Empire and Commonwealth Games alongside Terry Tobacco, Joe Foreman, and Laird Sloan. Clement attended the University of Oregon and University of British Columbia, where he obtained undergraduate and medical degrees respectively. He was also responsible for the introduction of sports medicine to Canada. Along with his wife, Diane, they have both been an integral part of athletics in British Columbia.

== Biography ==
Clement was born Montreal, Quebec, in 1933. He attended the University of Oregon on a track scholarship in the 1950s.

Clement competed at two Olympic Games. At the 1952 Summer Olympics in Helsinki, he competed in the men's 400 metres, but finished in last place in his heat. He was also part of the Canadian team for the men's 4 × 400 metres relay, with the team finishing in fourth place. Four years later, at the 1956 Summer Olympics in Melbourne, Clement competed in the men's 800 metres, but again did not get out of the heats. Once again, he was also part of the team for the men's 4 × 400 metres relay, finishing in fifth place.

In between the two Olympic Games, Clement also represented Canada at the 1954 British Empire and Commonwealth Games in Vancouver. In the men's 4 × 440 yards relay, he was part of the team that won the silver medal. He then went to the University of British Columbia, studying for a medical degree, before retiring from sport in 1959.

Clement went on to become a medical researcher, and taught at Simon Fraser University and the University of British Columbia. His wife, Diane also competed in the athletics events at the 1956 Summer Olympics, with the two of them forming a track club in 1962.

Clement has been inducted into the University of British Columbia Hall of Fame and the British Columbia Sports Halls of Fame, along with being inducted into the Canadian Olympic Hall of Fame. He was also made an Order of Canada in 1992. In 2019, his wife was awarded with the Order of Canada too.
