= Mary Symon (sprinter) =

Scottish athlete

Personal information
- Nationality: British (Scottish)
- Born: c.1941 Huntly, Scotland

Sport
- Sport: Athletics
- Event: Sprints
- Club: Bellahouston Harriers

Mary Symon (born c.1941) is a former track and field athlete from Scotland who competed at the 1958 British Empire and Commonwealth Games (now Commonwealth Games).

== Biography ==
Symon was born in Huntly but moved to Glasgow aged 5 and was educated at the Bellahouston Academy. She was a member of the Bellahouston Harriers and was the 1957 Scottish 100 yards intermediate champion and Scottish junior champion.

Symon competed at the 1958 Scottish national championships at New Meadowbank, with the view to gaining a place at the forthcoming Empire Games.

She represented the Scottish Empire and Commonwealth Games team at the 1958 British Empire Games in Cardiff, Wales, participating in two events, the 100 yards and the 4 × 110 yards relay, with Moira Campbell, Isabel Bond and Doris Tyndall.
