= Isabel Bond =

Scottish athlete

Isabel Bond née Murray
Personal information
- Nationality: British (Scottish)
- Born: 1935

Sport
- Sport: Athletics
- Event: Sprints
- Club: Ardeer Recreation Club

Isabel S. H. Bond née Murray (born 1935) is a former track and field athlete from Scotland who competed at the 1958 British Empire and Commonwealth Games (now Commonwealth Games).

== Biography ==
Bond was a member of the Ardeer Recreation Club and was the 1957 Scottish 100 yards champion.

She represented the West of Scotland in May 1957, defeating Doris Tyndall in the 220 yards final but was defeated by Moira Campbell at the 1957 Scottish Western Championships.

Bond represented the Scottish Empire and Commonwealth Games team at the 1958 British Empire Games in Cardiff, Wales, participating in two events, the 220 yards and the 4 × 110 yards relay, with Moira Campbell, Mary Symon and Doris Tyndall.
