= Annie Choong =

Malaysian sprinter (1934–2024)

Annie Choong OLY
Personal information
- National team: Malaysia
- Born: 20 February 1934
- Died: 2 November 2024 (aged 90) Petaling Jaya, Malaysia

Sport
- Sport: Sprinting
- Event: 100 metres

Annie Choong (20 February 1934 – 2 November 2024) was a Malaysian sprinter. She competed in the women's 100 metres at the 1956 Summer Olympics. She was the first woman to represent Malaysia at the Olympics.

Choong died from complications of dementia in Petaling Jaya, on 2 November 2024, at the age of 90.
