= Niliya Besedina-Kulakova =

Soviet hurdler

Personal information
- Nationality: Soviet
- Born: 1 December 1935 (age 90)

Sport
- Sport: Track and field
- Event: 80 metres hurdles

Niliya Besedina-Kulakova (born 1 December 1935) is a Soviet hurdler. She competed in the women's 80 metres hurdles at the 1956 Summer Olympics.
