= Mary Donaghy =

New Zealand athlete (born 1939)

Mary Hayward
Personal information
- Born: Jessie Mary Donaghy; 7 December 1939 (age 86) Thames, New Zealand
- Height: 1.59 m (5 ft 2 1/2 in)
- Weight: 52 kg (115 lb)
- Spouse: John Clive Hayward (m. 1963)

Sport
- Country: New Zealand
- Sport: Track and field
- Coached by: Frank Sharpley

Achievements and titles
- National finals: High jump champion (1955, 1956, 1957, 1958, 1959, 1961); Long jump champion (1959)
- Personal best: High jump – 1.71 m (5 ft 7 1/2 in)
Medal record
Women's athletics
Representing New Zealand
Commonwealth Games
Silver medal – second place	1958 Cardiff	high jump

Jessie Mary Hayward (née Donaghy, born 7 December 1939) is a former New Zealand high jumper and long jumper. She represented her country at the 1956 Summer Olympics and 1958 British Empire and Commonwealth Games, winning a silver medal in the high jump at the latter event.

== Early life and family ==
Hayward was born Jessie Mary Donaghy in Thames on 7 December 1939, the daughter of Nona Jessie Donaghy (née Baverstock) and James Stanly Donaghy. She grew up on her parents' farm at Waitakaruru, near Ngatea. After leaving school she worked in Ngatea for a motor company, before moving to Auckland in 1960 where she worked for a bank. In 1963, she married a dairy and poultry farmer, John Clive Hayward, and they lived on their farm at Netherton, near Paeroa.

== Athletics ==
Donaghy took up high jumping at the age of 14, when she entered a competition in Hamilton "just for fun", and cleared a height of 4 ft 10 in (1.47 m). At an athletics meet in Te Aroha in January 1955, Donaghy jumped 4 ft 11 in (1.50 m) at an event won by the national champion, Noelene Swinton, who suggested that Hayward should seek coaching from Frank Sharpley. For the next four years, Hayward had weekly training sessions with Sharpley at the Papakura Military Camp, where Sharpley was a physical trainer.

After just one session with Sharpley, Hayward leapt 5 ft 3 1/8 in (1.60 m) at the Thames Valley children's championships in February 1955, breaking the New Zealand women's high jump record. She went on to win the New Zealand national high jump title six times, winning every year from 1955 to 1961 except 1960. She recorded her personal best of 5 ft 7 1/2 in (1.71 m) in winning the 1961 championship. Donaghy also competed in the long jump, winning the national title in 1959 with a distance of 19 ft 9 in (6.02 m).

At 16 years old, Donaghy competed in the high jump at the 1956 Summer Olympics in Melbourne. Her best height of 1.67 m was the same as that of the silver medallists, but she finished in seventh place on a countback.

At the 1958 British Empire and Commonwealth Games in Cardiff, Donaghy cleared a height of 5 ft 7 in (1.70 m), the same as the winner, Michele Brown of Australia, but was awarded the silver medal on a countback. Donaghy also competed in the long jump, placing fifth with a distance of 18 ft 11 in (5.77 m), and was part of the New Zealand women's 4 x 110 yard relay team (with Beverly Weigel, Margaret Stuart and Marise Chamberlain) that finished fourth in the final.

Donaghy retired from athletics competition after the 1961 New Zealand national championships. She was the first woman to jump over her own height (1.59 m (5 ft 2 1/2 in)).

Following her retirement and marriage, Hayward coached at the Paeroa Amateur Athletics Club.
