= Frank Sharpley =

New Zealand track and field athlete

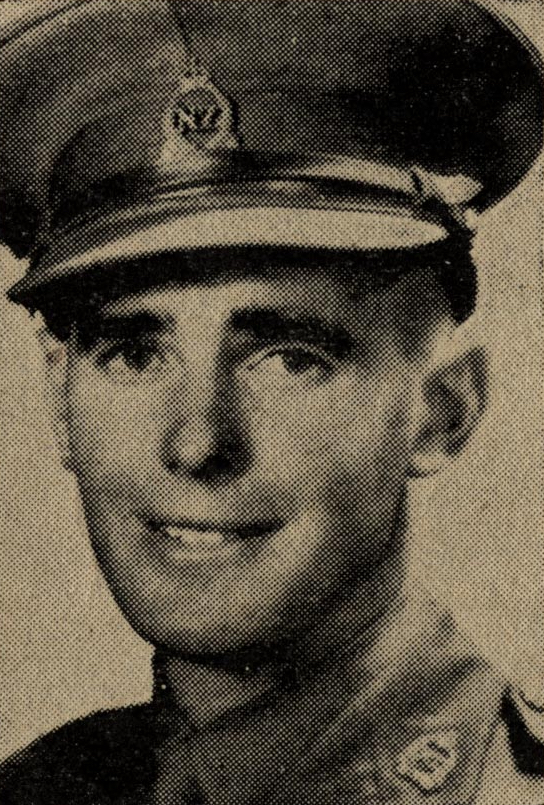

Personal information
- Born: Philip Francis Sharpley; 30 May 1914 Dublin, Ireland
- Died: 6 September 1987 (aged 73)
- Occupation(s): Soldier; Schoolteacher
- Spouse(s): Winifred Sheila Mary von Dadelszen (m. 1940) Una May Addis (m. 1950)

Sport
- Country: New Zealand
- Sport: Athletics

Achievements and titles
- National finals: 100 yd champion (1939); 120 yd hurdles champion (1934, 1936, 1939, 1940); 220 yd hurdles champion (1934, 1936, 1939, 1940)

Philip Francis Sharpley (30 May 1914 – 6 September 1987) was a New Zealand track and field athlete who represented his country at the 1938 British Empire Games.

== Early life and family ==
Born in Dublin, Ireland, on 30 May 1914, Sharpley was the son of Frederick James Sharpley and Sarah Jane Barry. The family emigrated to New Zealand in 1924, and settled in Hastings. Sharpley married Winifred Sheila Mary von Dadelszen, great-niece of Edward John von Dadelszen, at Havelock North on 30 December 1940. He married his second wife, Una May Addis, in 1950, and they had two children.

== Athletics ==
In all, Sharpley won nine New Zealand national athletics titles: the 120 yards hurdles and 220 yards hurdles in 1934, 1936, 1939, and 1940; and the 100 yards sprint in 1930. He held the national records for the 120 yards hurdles and 220 yards hurdles, with times of 14.8 seconds and 24.4 seconds, respectively.

At the 1938 British Empire Games in Sydney, Sharpley finished sixth in the final of the men's 120 yards hurdles. In the men's 100 yards sprint, he finished second in his heat and then last in his semi-final, and did not progress further.

Sharpley became involved in athletics coaching and assisted Rona Tong with her hurdling skills in the lead-up to the 1938 British Empire Games. He coached the New Zealand athletics team at the 1950 British Empire Games in Auckland, and later coached Mary Donaghy. Sharpley was also the athletics coach for the New Zealand team at the 1966 British Empire and Commonwealth Games in Kingston.

== Military service ==
During World War II, Sharpley served with the 2nd New Zealand Expeditionary Force. He was commissioned as a second lieutenant in the Anti-Tank Companies (4th reinforcements) in August 1940. At an army sports meeting in Cairo in July 1941, he won the 100 yards sprint and 220 yards hurdles events. Promoted to the rank of lieutenant, he was reported missing in August 1942, and was held as a prisoner of war in Germany. At the end of April 1945 he was reported to have returned to Britain, and held the rank of captain.

Sharpley was later a physical trainer at the Papakura Military Camp during compulsory military training in the 1950s.

== Later life and death ==
Sharpley became a schoolteacher, and he wrote and illustrated publications for Department of Education, including Running, jumping and throwing (1950), and Athletics: a guide book for teachers, coaches and players, which was first published in 1960, and reissued in 1973 and 1978.

In retirement, Sharpley worked with his wife, Una, a noted studio potter, and also developed a home-made pug mill for mixing clay for pottery.

Sharpley died on 6 September 1987, and his ashes were buried at Papakura Cemetery.

== Honorific eponym ==
Sharpley Place, in the Hamilton suburb of Chartwell, is named in Sharpley's honour.
