= Doris Tyndall =

Scottish athlete

Personal information
- Nationality: British (Scottish)
- Born: 31 March 1940 Carnoustie, Scotland
- Died: 2020 Dundee, Scotland

Sport
- Sport: Athletics
- Event: Sprints
- Club: Tayside AAC

Doris Millicent Tyndall (31 March 1940 – 2020) was a track and field athlete from Scotland who competed at the 1958 British Empire and Commonwealth Games (now Commonwealth Games).

== Biography ==
Tyndall was educated at Arbroath High School and was a member of the Tayside Amateur Athletic Club, making her senior debut for the East of Scotland in May 1957. At those championships she finished runner-up to Isabel Bond in the 220 yards. At the 1958 Scottish national championships at New Meadowbank, with the view to gaining a place at the forthcoming Empire Games.

She represented the Scottish Empire and Commonwealth Games team at the 1958 British Empire Games in Cardiff, Wales, participating in three events, the 100 yards, the 220 yards and the 4 × 110 yards relay, with Moira Campbell, Mary Symon and Isabel Bond.

She died in 2024.
