= Laird Sloan =

Canadian sprinter

Personal information
- Born: 3 October 1935 Quebec City, Quebec, Canada
- Died: 23 June 2017 (aged 81) Houston, Texas, US

Sport
- Sport: Sprinting
- Event: 400 metres
Medal record
Men's Athletics
Representing Canada
British Empire and Commonwealth Games
Silver medal – second place	1954 Vancouver	4×440 yards relay

Laird Sloan (3 October 1935 – 23 June 2017) was a Canadian sprinter. He competed in the men's 400 metres at the 1956 Summer Olympics. He finished second in the 1954 British Empire and Commonwealth Games 4 x 440 yards relay (with Terry Tobacco, Doug Clement, and Joe Foreman). In the 1954 British Empire and Commonwealth Games Sloan was eliminated in the semi-finals of the 440 yards.

As a student at the University of Michigan, Sloan was a member of Lambda Chi Alpha fraternity.
