= Elaine Winter (athlete) =

South African sprinter (born 1932)

Personal information
- Nationality: South African
- Born: 1 May 1932 (age 93) Barberton, South Africa

Sport
- Sport: Sprinting
- Event: 100 metres

Elaine Winter (born 1 May 1932) is a South African sprinter. She competed in the women's 100 metres at the 1956 Summer Olympics.
