= Norma Thrower =

Australian hurdler

Personal information
- Full name: Norma Claire Thrower
- Born: Norma Claire Austin; 5 February 1936 (age 90) Adelaide, South Australia
- Height: 166 cm (5 ft 5 in)
- Weight: 57 kg (126 lb)
Medal record
Women's athletics
Representing Australia
Olympic Games
Bronze medal – third place	1956 Melbourne	80 metres hurdles
British Empire and Commonwealth Games
Gold medal – first place	1958 Cardiff	80 metres hurdles

Norma Claire Thrower (née Austin, born 5 February 1936) is a retired Australian hurdler. The South Australian hurdler ran for the Western Districts club in Adelaide.

At the 1956 Summer Olympics in Melbourne, Australia she won the bronze medal over 80 metres hurdles behind countrywoman Shirley Strickland (gold) and German Gisela Köhler (silver).

At the 1958 British Empire and Commonwealth Games in Cardiff she again won the 80m hurdles event, this time ahead of Carole Quinton (silver) and countrywoman Gloria Wigney (bronze).

At the Australian championships she won a silver medal in 1952, a bronze in 1954 and gold medals in 1956, 1958 and 1960.

Thrower set a world record of 10.6 seconds for 80 metres hurdles in 1960, but could not make the final at the 1960 Summer Olympics in Rome.
