= Jonas Pipynė =

Lithuanian Olympic runner (1935–1997)

Olympic medal record

Men’s Athletics

Representing Soviet Union

World University Games
Silver medal – second place	1957 Paris	1500 m

Jonas Pipynė (30 November 1935 in Biržai – 23 September 1997 in Vilnius) was a Lithuanian track and field runner and skier.

In 1957, he was named the Lithuanian Sportsman of the Year. In 1954 Pipynė won gold medal in national cross country skiing championships. Sixteen times he won gold medals in Lithuanian Athletics Championships. He reached national Lithuanian running records 32 times in 1500 m, 800 m, 1000 m, 2000 m, 5000 m, mile, 4x800, 4x1500, 4x400 events and four times achieved Soviet Union record in 1500 m run. 4 times in a row 1956–1959 became Soviet Union champion. Pipynė represented Soviet Union in the 1956 Summer Olympics.

== Personal bests ==
Event	Time (sec)	Venue	Date
1500 metres	3:41.1 (NRU23)	Moscow, Soviet Union	4 August 1957
2000 metres	5:08.4 (NR)	Vilnius, Soviet Union	7 September 1958
