= Kay Johnson (athlete) =

Australian sprinter (born 1940)

Personal information
- Nationality: Australian
- Born: 18 July 1940 (age 85) Western Australia

Sport
- Sport: Track and field
Medal record
Representing Australia
British Empire and Commonwealth Games
Silver medal – second place	1958 Cardiff	4 × 110 yards relay

Kay Johnson (born 18 July 1940) is a retired sprinter from Western Australia. During the 1958 British Empire and Commonwealth Games in Cardiff, she won a silver medal in the 4 × 110 yards relay, and also competed in the 100 yards event.
