= Beverly Weigel =

New Zealand athlete (born 1940)

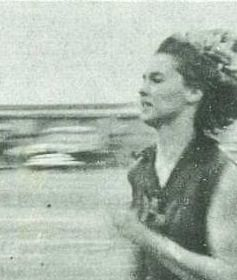
- Weigel in 1957

Personal information
- Born: Beverly Dawn Edith Weigel; 16 August 1940 (age 86) Auckland, New Zealand
- Education: Kelston High School
- Height: 164 cm (5 ft 5 in)
- Weight: 53 kg (117 lb)

Sport
- Country: New Zealand
- Sport: Long jump

Beverly Dawn Edith Weigel (born 16 August 1940), with her first name commonly misspelled as Beverley and since her marriage known as Beverly Robertson, is a New Zealand athlete. Mainly active as a long jumper, but also as a sprinter, she represented her country at the 1956 Summer Olympics, the 1958 British Empire and Commonwealth Games, and the 1960 Summer Olympics.

== Life ==
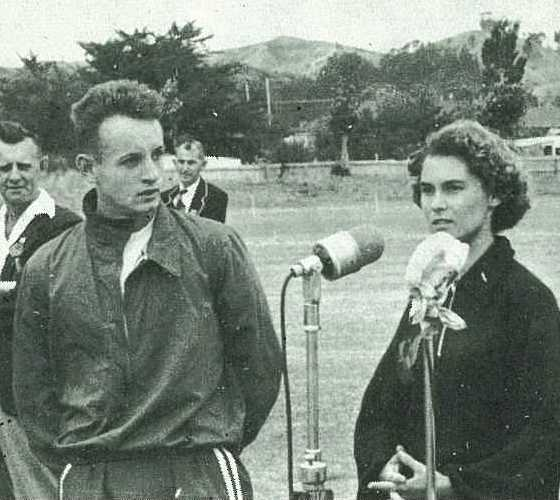
NZ sprinter Maurice Rae and Weigel in 1957

Weigel was born in 1940 in Auckland, New Zealand. She received her education at Kelston High School (now Kelston Girls' College, but co-ed at the time). Described as a "phenomenal athlete", she won the New Zealand senior women's long jump title at age 15. This secured her a place on the New Zealand Olympic team for the 1956 Summer Olympics in Melbourne, Australia, and she is listed as New Zealand Olympian number 126. Of the nine track and field athletes who represented the country, she was the youngest at age 16. She competed in long jump and of 19 competitors, she came 7th. In 1957, she set a world junior record with a long jump of 6.23 metres (20.4 ft) in Auckland – a distance that would have won her a silver medal at the 1956 Olympics.

At the 1958 British Empire and Commonwealth Games, Weigel competed in three events. In the women's long jump, she placed eighth. In the 100 yards women's race, she was eliminated in the heats. With Mary Donaghy, Margaret Stuart, and Marise Chamberlain, she competed in the 4×110 yards relay and they came 4th. At the 1960 Summer Olympics in Rome, Italy, she was one of New Zealand's fourteen track and field athletes. Again competing in the long jump, she came 10th from 30 competitors.

On 9 February 1957 Beverly beat the 1949 Junior World Best by 11 cm at a meet in Papakura. She was also only 12 cm under the Women's Open World Record. This performance was never officially recognised as a record.
