= 1957 World University Games =

Multi-sport event in Paris, France

- Host city: Paris, France
- Events: 54 in 7 sports
- Opening: August 31, 1957
- Closing: September 8, 1957
- Main venue: Stade Sébastien Charléty

The 1957 World University Games, the 22nd edition of the World University Games, were held between 31 August and 8 September. They were organised under the direction of Jean Petitjean by the Paris University Club in Paris at their Stadium Charlety. He engaged an American student athlete at the Paris University Club, Martin Feinberg, as his assistant. Petitjean met with and encouraged both Eastern and Western Bloc student sports federations to participate together, which they did for the first time since the end of World War II.

A documentary of the event

== Sports ==
- Athletics
- Basketball
- Fencing
- Swimming
- Tennis
- Volleyball
- Water polo
