= Anna Bocson =

Australian javelin thrower

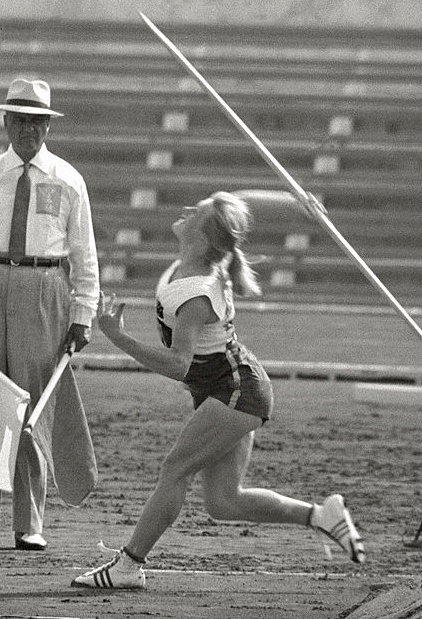
- Bocson at the 1960 Olympics

Personal information
- Born: Anna Wojtaszek; 25 November 1936 (age 89) Krzanowice, Poland
- Height: 1.60 m (5 ft 3 in)
- Weight: 65 kg (143 lb)

Sport
- Sport: Athletics
- Event: Javelin throw
- Club: Budowlani Opole (–1956)

Achievements and titles
- Personal best: 57.40 m (1958)
Medal record
Representing Australia
Commonwealth Games
Gold medal – first place	1958 Cardiff	Javelin
Silver medal – second place	1966 Kingston	Javelin
Bronze medal – third place	1962 Perth	Javelin

Anna Bocson (née Wojtaszek, divorced Pazera; born 25 November 1936) is a Poland-born Australian retired athlete who specialised in the javelin throw.

She competed for Poland at the 1956 Olympic Games in Melbourne and finished ninth. After the Games, she emigrated to South Australia, becoming Anna Pazera through marriage. She then represented Australia at the 1958 British Empire and Commonwealth Games in Cardiff and won a gold medal with a throw of 57.40 metres, breaking Dana Zátopková's world record by a metre and a half. Her best Olympic performance was in 1960, when she placed sixth in the final of the Rome Games.

Remarried and known as Anna Bocson for the latter part of her career, she retired from sport after the 1968 Australian Championships.

== International competitions ==
Year	Competition	Venue	Position	Event	Notes
Representing Poland
1956	Olympic Games	Melbourne, Australia	9th	Javelin throw	46.92 m
Representing Australia
1958	British Empire and Commonwealth Games	Melbourne, Australia	1st	Javelin throw	57.40 m
1960	Olympic Games	Rome, Italy	6th	Javelin throw	51.15 m
1962	British Empire and Commonwealth Games	Perth, Australia	3rd	Javelin throw	48.68 m
1964	Olympic Games	Tokyo, Japan	15th (q)	Javelin throw	44.87 m
1966	British Empire and Commonwealth Games	Kingston, Jamaica	2nd	Javelin throw	47.81 m

== See also ==
- List of Australian athletics champions (women)
