= Joe Foreman =

Canadian sprinter (1935–1999)

Joseph Foreman
Personal information
- Born: 19 May 1935 Toronto, Ontario, Canada
- Died: 28 April 1999 (aged 63) Lambton County, Ontario, Canada

Sport
- Sport: Sprinting
- Event: 200 metres
Medal record
Men's Athletics
Representing Canada
British Empire and Commonwealth Games
Silver medal – second place	1954 Vancouver	4×440 yards relay

Joseph Foreman (19 May 1935 – 28 April 1999) was a Canadian sprinter. He competed in the men's 200 metres at the 1956 Summer Olympics. He finished second in the 1954 British Empire and Commonwealth Games 4 x 440 yards relay (with Terry Tobacco, Doug Clement, and Laird Sloan). In the 1954 British Empire and Commonwealth Games Foreman was eliminated in the heats of the 440 yards. He died in an automobile accident in 1999.
