= Claudette Masdammer =

Guyanese sprinter

Personal information
- Nationality: Guyanese
- Born: 30 March 1939
- Died: 13 November 2013 (aged 74)

Sport
- Sport: Sprinting
- Event: 100 metres

Claudette Masdammer (30 March 1939 – 13 November 2013) was a Guyanese sprinter. She competed in the women's 100 metres and women's 200 metres at the 1956 Summer Olympics. She was the first woman to represent Guyana at the Olympics. She also competed in the 1958 British Empire and Commonwealth Games.
