= Magdalena Swanepoel =

South African track and field athlete

Medal record

Women's athletics

Representing South Africa

British Empire and Commonwealth Games
| Gold medal – first place | 1954 Vancouver | Javelin throw |
| Silver medal – second place | 1958 Cardiff | Javelin throw |
| Bronze medal – third place | 1954 Vancouver | Shot put |

Magdalena Catherina Swanepoel (7 November 1930 – 2 June 2007) was a South African track and field athlete who competed in the shot put and javelin throw events.

She was born in Hopetown, a town in the north-west part of South Africa in Thembelihle Local Municipality. She spent most of her life in Pretoria. Over her sporting career she broke the South African record six times in the javelin and on ten occasions for the shot put, ending with lifetime bests of 49.28 m (161 ft 8 in) for the javelin and 13.53 m (44 ft 4 1/2 in) for the shot put. She was a 13-time national champion in throwing events, including eight javelin titles.

Her greatest achievements came at the Commonwealth Games. At the 1954 British Empire and Commonwealth Games she added almost five metres to the previous javelin games record by winning the gold medal with a throw of 43.83 m (143 ft 9 1/2 in). THis made her South Africa's first women's throws champion at the competition. She also took a bronze in the shot put that year, about a metre down on the winner, New Zealand's Yvette Williams.

Swanepoel returned four years later to defend her title but although she threw close to a career best with 48.73 m (159 ft 10 1/2 in) she was a long way short of Australia's Anna Pazera, whose winning throw of 57.41 m (188 ft 4 in) would stand as a record for twenty years. Swanepoel also had an improved performance in the shot put, with 13.17 m (43 ft 2 1/2 in), but finished off the podium in fourth as all medallists went beyond fourteen metres that year.

After retiring from active competition she took up coaching in Pretoria and worked as a lecturer at Normal College Pretoria.

== International competitions ==
| Year | Competition | Venue | Position | Event | Notes |
|---|---|---|---|---|---|
| 1954 | British Empire and Commonwealth Games | Vancouver, British Columbia, Canada | 3rd | Shot put | 12.81 m |
| 1954 | British Empire and Commonwealth Games | Vancouver, British Columbia, Canada | 1st | Javelin throw | 43.83 m GR |
| 1958 | British Empire and Commonwealth Games | Cardiff, Wales | 4th | Shot put | 13.17 m |
| 1958 | British Empire and Commonwealth Games | Cardiff, Wales | 2nd | Javelin throw | 48.73 m |
