= Diane Matheson =

Canadian sprinter

Personal information
- Born: 27 September 1936 (age 89) Moncton, New Brunswick, Canada

Sport
- Sport: Sprinting
- Event: 100 metres
Medal record
Women's athletics
Representing Canada
British Empire and Commonwealth Games
| Bronze medal – third place | 1958 Cardiff | 4×110 yards relay |

Diane Matheson (born 27 September 1936) is a Canadian sprinter. She competed in the women's 100 metres at the 1956 Summer Olympics. At the 1958 British Empire and Commonwealth Games, she won a bronze medal in the 4×110 yard relay event alongside Eleanor Haslam, Maureen Rever, and Freyda Berman.
