= Athletics at the 1957 World University Games =

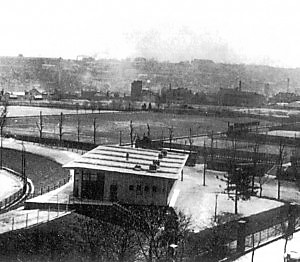
- Dates: 5–8 September
- Host city: Paris, France
- Venue: Stadium Charlety
- Events: 29

Athletics events were contested at the 1957 World University Games in Paris, France, between 5 and 8 September.

== Medal summary ==
=== Men ===
Event	Gold		Silver		Bronze	
100 metres	Manfred Germar (FRG)	10.5	Ira Murchison (USA)	10.6	Leonid Bartenyev (URS)	10.7
200 metres	Manfred Germar (FRG)	21.3	Leonid Bartenyev (URS)	21.7	Habib Thiam (FRA)	21.8
400 metres	Jim Paterson (GBR)	48.4	Walter Oberste (FRG)	48.8	Csaba Csutorás (HUN)	48.8
800 metres	Olaf Lawrenz (FRG)	1:50.3	Josef Cegledi (AUT)	1:50.6	Edward Buswell (GBR)	1:51.6
1500 metres	Josef Cegledi (AUT)	3:50.5	Jonas Pipyne (URS)	3:51.0	Harald Mengler (FRG)	3:51.3
5000 metres	Kevin Gilligan (GBR)	14:31.0	Veliša Mugoša (YUG)	14:32.8	Gerhart Hecker (HUN)	14:37.0
110 metres hurdles	Stanko Lorger (YUG)	14.5	Georgi Kaburov (BUL)	14.9	Milad Petrušić (YUG)	14.9
400 metres hurdles	Igor Ilyin (URS)	53.3	Anubes da Silva (BRA)	53.6	Keiji Ogushi (JPN)	54.1
4 × 100 metres relay	(France) France; Hubert Dufernez; Christian Larrieu; Habib Thiam; Joël Caprice	41.4	(West Germany) West Germany; Dieter Kröger; Klaus Förster; Karl-Heinz Naujoks; Manfred Germar	41.4	(Soviet Union) Soviet Union; Vladilyen Marin; Albert Plaskeyev; Yuriy Petrov; Leonid Bartenyev	41.5
4 × 400 metres relay	(West Germany) West Germany; Günther Glaeske; Otto Klappert; Ralph Seidel; Walter Oberste	3:16.9	(United Kingdom) Great Britain & N.I. Chris Goudge; Les Locke; Edward Buswell; Jim Paterson	3:18.6	(Italy) Italy; Germano Gimelli; Elio Catola; Mario Paoletti; Enrico Archilli	3:21.8
10,000 metres walk	Franciszek Szyszka (POL)	47:10.6	Jerzy Łoskoczyński (POL)	49:30.2	only 2 finishers	N/A
High jump	Yuriy Stepanov (URS)	2.12	Igor Kashkarov (URS)	2.01	Ernie Shelton (USA)	1.98
Pole vault	Zenon Ważny (POL)	4.40	Jerry Welbourn (USA)	4.30	Leon Lukman (YUG)	4.25
Long jump	Dieter Witte (FRG)	7.41	Vladimir Popov (URS)	7.23	Branko Miler (YUG)	7.19
Triple jump	Oleg Ryakhovskiy (URS)	16.01	Éric Battista (FRA)	15.78	Kari Rahkamo (FIN)	15.38
Shot put	Vartan Ovsepyan (URS)	16.57	Josef Klik (FRG)	15.91	Jean-Pierre Lassau (FRA)	15.89
Discus throw	Viktor Kompaniyets (URS)	53.38	József Szécsényi (HUN)	51.57	Eugeniusz Wachowski (POL)	49.59
Hammer throw	Anatoliy Samotsvetov (URS)	58.60	Zvonko Bezjak (YUG)	57.95	Gyula Zsivótzky (HUN)	55.81
Javelin throw	Viktor Tsybulenko (URS)	80.63	Jan Kopyto (POL)	77.79	Tadeusz Paprocki (POL)	73.58

=== Women ===
Event	Gold		Silver		Bronze	
100 metres	Vera Krepkina (URS)	11.8	Galina Popova (URS)	11.8	Giuseppina Leone (ITA)	11.9
200 metres	Mariya Itkina (URS)	24.6	Nina Dyeonskaya (URS)	25.0	Giuseppina Leone (ITA)	25.0
800 metres	Yelizaveta Yermolayeva (URS)	2:12.3	Ariane Doser (FRG)	2:13.4	Milica Rajkov (YUG)	2:13.6
80 metres hurdles	Milka Babović (YUG)	11.5	Hilke Thymm (FRG)	11.7	Ilsabe Heider (FRG)	11.7
4 × 100 metres relay	(Soviet Union) Soviet Union; Vera Krepkina; Nina Dyeonskaya; Mariya Itkina; Galina Popova	46.4	(West Germany) West Germany; Christiane Voß; Inge Fuhrmann; Irene Brütting; Hilke Thymm	47.4	(Italy) Italy; Elisabetta Mattana; Giuseppina Leone; Franca Peggion; Anna Doro	49.0
High jump	Iolanda Balas (ROM)	1.66	Valentina Ballod (URS)	1.60	Jarosława Jóźwiakowska (POL)	1.55
Long jump	Vera Kalashnikova (URS)	6.03	Maria Ciastowska (POL)	5.93	Inge Fuhrmann (FRG)	5.83
Shot put	Galina Zybina (URS)	15.75	Earlene Brown (USA)	14.43	Milena Usenik (YUG)	14.02
Discus throw	Irina Beglyakova (URS)	48.83	Györgyi Hegedus (HUN)	45.11	Ida Bucsányi (HUN)	43.64
Javelin throw	Maria Diţi (ROM)	52.38	Inese Jaunzeme (URS)	52.19	Almut Brömmel (FRG)	51.76

== Medal table ==
Rank	Nation	Gold	Silver	Bronze	Total
1	Soviet Union (URS)	14	8	2	24
2	West Germany (FRG)	5	6	4	15
3	Poland (POL)	2	3	3	8
4	Yugoslavia (YUG)	2	2	5	9
5	Great Britain (GBR)	2	1	1	4
6	Romania (ROM)	2	0	0	2
7	Austria (AUT)	1	1	0	2
8	France (FRA)	1	0	2	3
9	United States (USA)	0	3	1	4
10	Hungary (HUN)	0	2	4	6
11	Brazil (BRA)	0	1	0	1
11	Bulgaria (BUL)	0	1	0	1
13	Italy (ITA)	0	0	4	4
14	Finland (FIN)	0	0	1	1
14	Japan (JPN)	0	0	1	1
Totals (15 entries)		29	28	28	85

== See also ==
- FISU World University Games § Precursors
- University and college sport
