= Madeleine Cobb =

British sprinter (born 1940)

Madeleine Cobb née Weston
Personal information
- Nationality: British (English)
- Born: 3 July 1940 (age 85) Wandsworth, London, England
- Height: 157 cm (5 ft 2 in)
- Weight: 51 kg (112 lb)

Sport
- Sport: Athletics
- Event: Sprinting
- Club: Selsonia Ladies AC
Medal record
Women's athletics
Representing Great Britain
European Championships
Silver medal – second place	1958 Stockholm	4×100 m relay
Representing England
British Empire and Commonwealth Games
Gold medal – first place	1958 Cardiff	4×110 yd relay
Bronze medal – third place	1958 Cardiff	100 yd
Silver medal – second place	1970 Edinburgh	4 x 100m relay

Violet Madeleine Cobb née Weston (born 3 July 1940), is a British former sprinter. She competed in the women's 100 metres at the 1964 Summer Olympics.

== Career ==
Westin finished second behind Heather Young in the 100 yards event at the 1957 WAAA Championships.

The following year Weston became the national 100 yards champion after winning the British WAAA Championships title at the 1958 WAAA Championships. One month later she represented England and won a gold medal in the 4 x 110 yard relay and a bronze medal in the 100 yards at the 1958 British Empire and Commonwealth Games in Cardiff, Wales.

Weston married David Cobb in spring 1961 and competed under her married name thereafter.

Twelve years later she represented England again and won a silver medal in the 4 x 100 metres relay, at the 1970 British Commonwealth Games in Edinburgh.

== Personal life ==
Cobb lived on Garratt Lane in Earlsfield, south London.
