= Gloria Wigney =

Australian athletics competitor

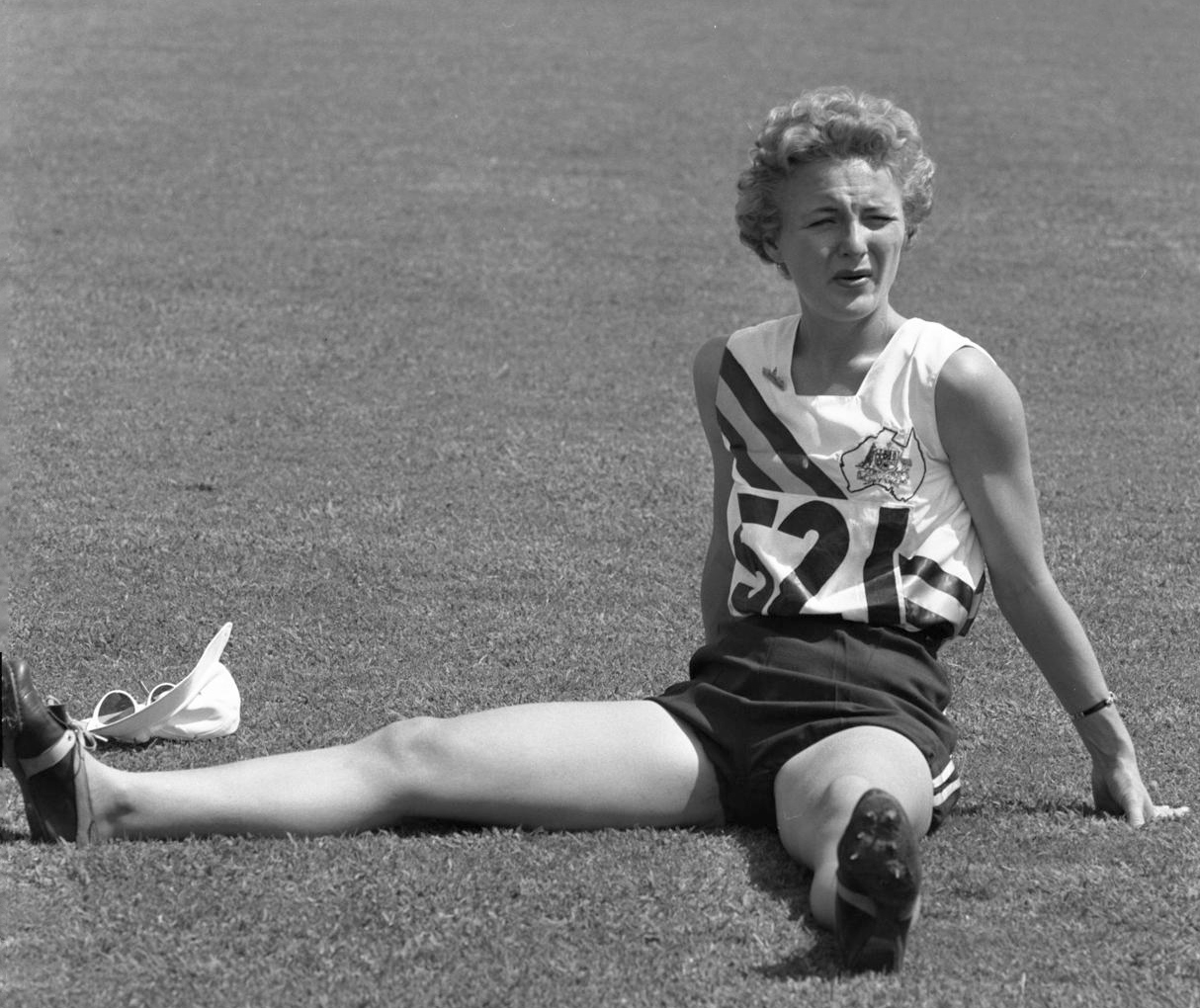
- Gloria Wigney at the 1960 Olympics

Personal information
- Born: 17 November 1934 (age 91) Stanmore, New South Wales, Australia
- Height: 165 cm (5 ft 5 in)
- Weight: 55 kg (121 lb)

Sport
- Sport: Athletics
- Events: Hurdles, sprint
- Club: Western Suburbs AAC, Sydney

Achievements and titles
- Personal bests: 80 mH – 10.8 (1960); 100 m – 11.7 (1959)
Medal record
Representing Australia
British Empire and Commonwealth Games
Bronze medal – third place	1958 Cardiff	80 m hurdles

Gloria Janet Wigney (née Cooke on 17 November 1934) is a retired Australian sprinter. Competing in the 80 m hurdles event she placed third at the 1958 British Empire and Commonwealth Games and sixth at the 1956 Summer Olympics. In late 1961 she gave birth to a son. At the time, she lived in Bantry Bay (New South Wales). She twice represented Australia at the Summer Olympics, competing in 1956 and 1960.
