= June Foulds =

British sprinter (1934–2020)

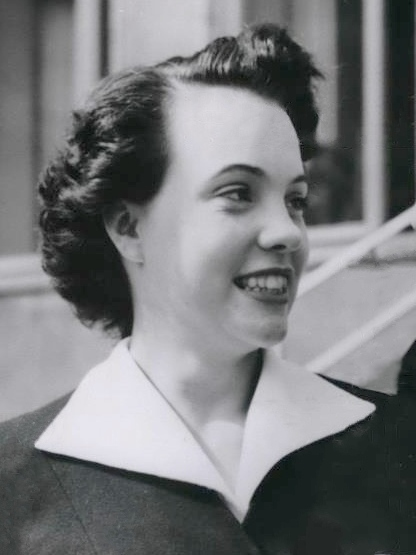
- June Foulds in 1952

Personal information
- Born: June Florence Foulds; 13 June 1934 Shepherd's Bush, England
- Died: 6 November 2020 (aged 86)
- Height: 170 cm (5 ft 7 in)
- Weight: 63 kg (139 lb)

Sport
- Sport: Athletics
- Event(s): 100 m, 200 m
- Club: Spartan Ladies; L.A.C.

Achievements and titles
- Personal best(s): 100 m – 11.6 (1956); 200 m – 23.7 (1956)
Medal record
Women's athletics
Representing Great Britain
Olympic Games
Silver medal – second place	1956 Melbourne	4×100 m
Bronze medal – third place	1952 Helsinki	4×100 m
European Championships
Gold medal – first place	1950 Brussels	4×100 m
Bronze medal – third place	1950 Brussels	100 m
Representing England
British Empire and Commonwealth Games
Gold medal – first place	1958 Cardiff	4×110 yd

June Florence Paul, née Foulds, (13 June 1934 – 6 November 2020) was a British track and field sprint runner.

== Early life ==
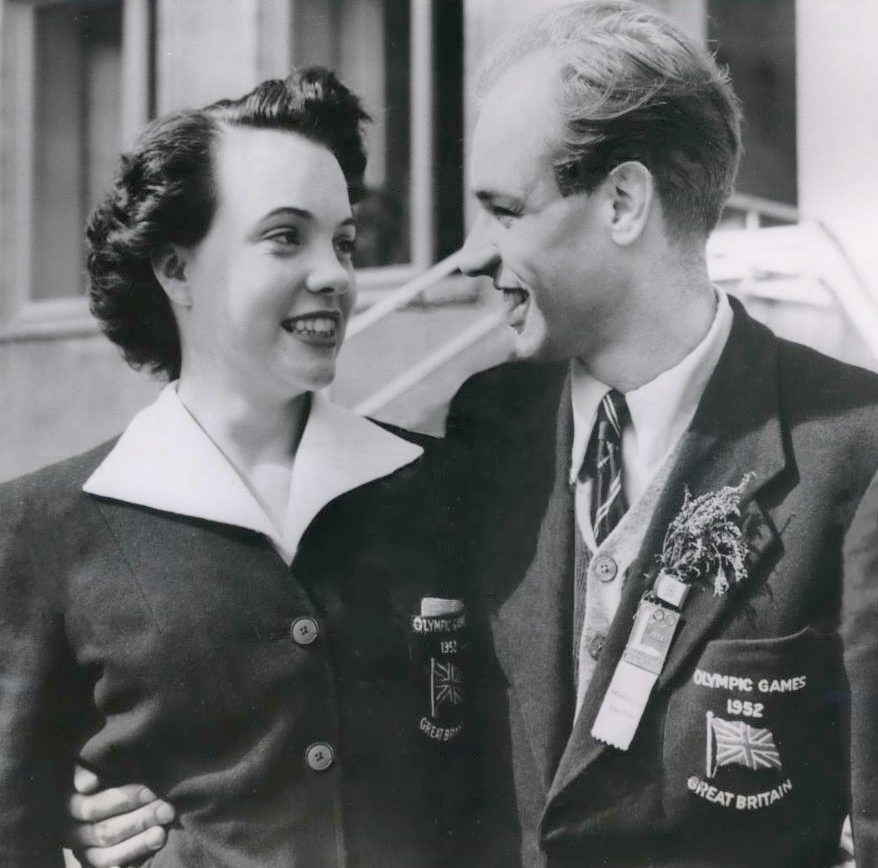
Foulds (left) and Raymond Paul in 1952

Born June Florence Foulds in Shepherd's Bush in 1934, she was brought up by her grandparents.

She originated from East Acton. She lived at 80 Fitzneal Street. She attended Burlington Grammar School on Wood Lane. She left school in 1951 aged 17.

== Personal life ==
She married British Olympic fencer Raymond Paul. Their son Steven Paul also became an Olympic fencer and their nephew Barry Paul won a Commonwealth Games gold medal. She was the second wife of singer Ronnie Carroll, with whom she co-owned a successful club in Grenada in the 1970s, until political unrest halted tourism. They were to later divorce. Her third husband was Eric Reynolds, divorcing after two years. She ran a food stall and became a key figure in the development of the Camden Lock Markets, she ran several restaurants in London, including those trading as "Huffs". In 1993 she started running the "Hampstead Everyman Cinema", in Hampstead, London, turning the basement into a popular bar and restaurant, later selling the entire site to the Everyman Group.

She appeared as a castaway on the BBC Radio programme Desert Island Discs on 17 November 1958.

Foulds died at the age of 86.

== Athletics career ==
Foulds became the national 100 metres champion after winning the British WAAA Championships title at the 1950 WAAA Championships and successfully retained her title the following year at the 1951 WAAA Championships.

Foulds competed in the 100 m, 200 m and 4 × 100 metres relay at the 1952 and 1956 Olympics and won a bronze and a silver medal in the relay. Her best individual result was fifth place in the 200 m in 1956.

Paul sealed a sprint double at the 1956 WAAA Championships, winning both the 100 and 220 yards titles.

At the 1958 British Empire and Commonwealth Games she won a gold medal in the 4 × 110 yd relay in a world-record time alongside Dorothy Hyman, Madeleine Weston, and Heather Armitage and placed fourth in the 220 yards and fifth in the 100 yards.
