= Wendy Ey =

Australian track and field athlete, administrator, academic, author and feminist

Wendy Ey BEM
Personal information
- Nationality: Australian
- Born: Wendy Hayes; 21 May 1938 Merrylands, New South Wales, Australia
- Died: 30 May 1997 (aged 59) Mandurah, Western Australia, Australia

Sport
- Country: Australia
- Sport: Athletics
Medal record
Women's athletics
Representing Australia
British Empire and Commonwealth Games
Silver medal – second place	1958 Cardiff	4×110 yards relay

Wendy Ey BEM (21 May 1938 -30 May 1997), born Wendy Hayes, was an Australian track and field athlete, administrator, academic, author and feminist. She was an athletics sprint and hurdles champion from 1954 until 1960 and a Commonwealth Games silver medalist in Cardiff, Wales in 1958. Ey also excelled at squash and hockey. Ey continued to be an active sport participant all her life and was a master’s world champion in athletics.

Ey was awarded the British Empire Medal in the 1977 Silver Jubilee and Birthday Honours for service to sport.

Ey was a lecturer and researcher in physical education at the University of South Australia. She co-authored and published a range of papers on women in sport. In 1987 she was appointed as Women’s Adviser to the South Australian Minister of Sport and Recreation. She died from cancer in 1997.

== Wendy Ey Scholarship ==
Ey was committed to enhancing opportunities for women in sport and recreation. Her legacy has been continued through the establishment of scholarships by the Office for Recreation and Sport, to encourage and assist female coaches or officials (who are coaching/officiating at, or striving to coach/officiate at an elite level), to accept further professional development opportunities in their chosen sport.

== Wendy Ey Award ==
In recognition and honour of Ey's work Sports Medicine Australia has awarded the "Wendy Ey Award for Best Paper on Women in Sport" as part of its annual Conference of Science and Medicine in Sport since 1998.
