= Jackie MacDonald =

Canadian athlete (1932–2026)

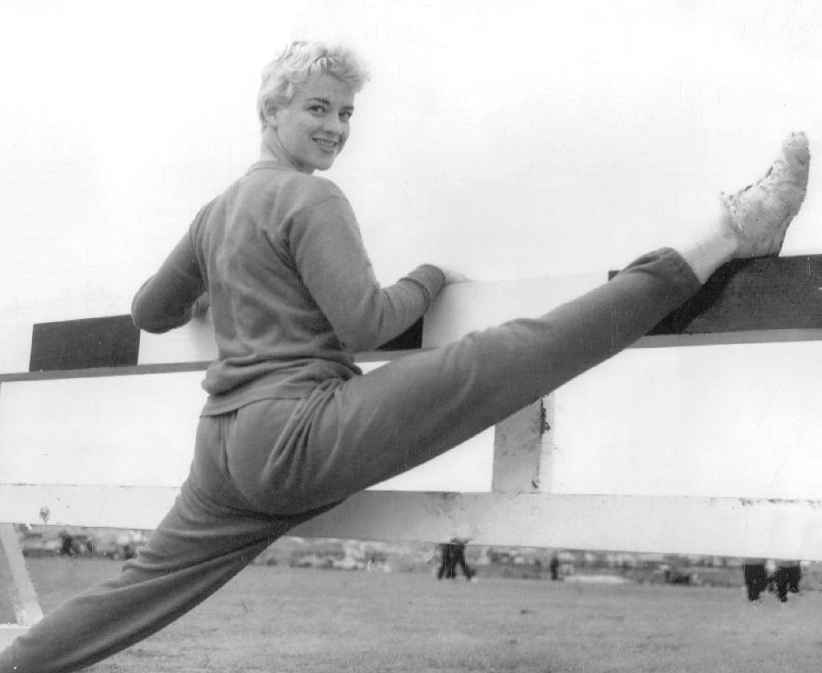
- MacDonald in 1956

Personal information
- Born: October 12, 1932 Toronto, Ontario, Canada
- Died: June 25, 2026 (aged 93)

Sport
- Sport: Athletics
- Events: Shot put, discus throw

Achievements and titles
- Personal bests: SP – 14.31 m (1956); DT – 43.30 m (1956)
Medal record
Representing Canada
British Empire and Commonwealth Games
Silver medal – second place	1954 Vancouver	Shot put
Bronze medal – third place	1958 Cardiff	Shot put

Jacqueline MacDonald (October 12, 1932 – June 25, 2026) was a Canadian track and field athlete.

MacDonald competed in the 1956 Summer Olympics and placed 10th in the shot put and 19th in the discus throw. She won a silver medal in the shot at the 1954 British Empire and Commonwealth Games, was fifth in the discus at the 1955 Pan American Games, sixth in the shot at the 1957 World Youth Games in Moscow, and, under her married name of Jackie Gelling, won a bronze medal in the shot at the 1958 British Empire and Commonwealth Games.

== The early years ==
Toronto high schools in the late 1940s limited girls sports to watered down volleyball and basketball, no track and field or other sports, and no inter high school competition. At 15, frustrated with girl's rules basketball, MacDonald joined a Toronto city league basketball team, setting a record of 38 points in one game. Her team won junior city, provincial and national championships. In the 1953 Ontario Intermediate B Championships she scored 35 points in one game, 10 more than the entire opposing team from Sudbury. She also started swimming competitively and won the Ontario Junior Diving Championship in 1948.

In 1953, at age 20, she approached Lloyd Percival to coach her in shot put and discus. This led to MacDonald winning the Canadian Championship in the shot in her first year of competition. Percival also introduced her to weight training for strength, which was innovative for women athletes in the 1950s. This drew a lot of international media attention.

== Track and field achievements ==
MacDonald's career in track and field included five international competitions between 1954 and 1958. The following list includes the most important achievements over that period:

- 1954: Broke existing Canadian records in shot and discus
- 1954: Silver medal in shot at the British Empire and Commonwealth Games in Vancouver
- 1954: Ranked first in the women's shot in the Western Hemisphere, second in the Commonwealth, and equal 57th in the world
- 1955: Fifth place in the discus at the Pan American Games in Mexico City (there was no shot put for women)
- 1955: Ranked first in the women's shot in the Western Hemisphere, second in the Commonwealth, and 37th in the world
- 1955: Ranked third in the women's discus in the Western Hemisphere and 57th in the world
- 1956: Second place in the shot (and broke the existing US record) at the US Indoor Track and Field Championships in Washington
- 1956: Second place in the shot and discus (and broke the existing US record in each event) at the US Outdoor Track and Field Championships in Philadelphia
- 1956: Tenth place in the shot at the Olympic Games in Melbourne, Australia
- 1956: Ranked second in the women's shot put in the Western Hemisphere and 26th in the world
- 1956: Ranked fifth in the women's discus in the Western Hemisphere and 93rd in the world
- 1957: Sixth place in the shot at the World Youth Games in Moscow (The World Youth Games were the Athletics part of the World Youth Festival where MacDonald was the only Canadian participant by special invitation)
- 1958: Bronze medal in the shot at the British Empire and Commonwealth Games in Cardiff, Wales (competing as Jackie Gelling)
- Canadian Champion in Women's Shot Put for 1953, 1954, 1955, 1956 and 1958; and in Women's Discus for 1955 and 1956
- Held Canadian record for Women's Shot Put continuously from 1954 through 1962. Personal bests achieved in 1956 Olympics exceeded existing Canadian records for both shot and discus but the Amateur Athletic Association of Canada did not recognize records set outside Canada at that time.

== Controversies ==
At the British Empire and Commonwealth Games in 1954, after winning a silver medal in the shot, MacDonald was withdrawn from the discus just minutes before the competition was to start on suspicion of professionalism. This arose from her appearance in a newspaper advertisement wearing her team uniform and holding a soft drink in her hand. The Amateur Athletic Association of Canada exonerated her a few days later, preserving her amateur status but too late for the discus event. After experiencing nationwide controversy over the eviction of one of his athletes from her event and amidst other issues surrounding the selection of coaches for the Canadian team, Percival quit coaching track and field, leaving MacDonald without a coach for the rest of her athletics career.

== The later years ==
MacDonald married William Gelling in 1958, and used Jackie Gelling as her married name until 1990. In 1990, when living with her husband in Montreal, she officially changed her name back to MacDonald, as was common practice in the Province of Quebec.

After the 1958 British Empire and Commonwealth Games, MacDonald returned home disillusioned by what she felt was a lack of interest and support for amateur sport in Canada. Without a coach and no financial support, she withdrew from track and field competition.

MacDonald took up masters swimming, winning medals in Canadian and American Championships. At 39 she started playing water polo. In her mid 40s MacDonald started cycling with the Ottawa Bicycle Club. In 1985 she competed in the World Masters Championships, winning the criterium and placing second in both the time trial and the road race in the 50 to 54 age category. At 61 she joined the Ottawa Rowing Club and competed as a member of a coxed four in her first year. MacDonald became the first woman to participate in cycling club time trials in the 80 to 89 age category. At 81 she was interviewed at a local gym by an Ottawa TV station as she stretched, did weight training and worked out on a rowing machine.

MacDonald died on June 25, 2026, at the age of 93.

== Academic and professional ==
- Toronto Normal School: Ontario Teaching Certificate
- Carleton University: BA
- University of Ottawa: BEd Cum Laude (Specialist in Teaching English as a Second Language)
- Manitoba Professional (Teaching) Certificate
- Univérsité de Montréal: MA (Linguistique)

MacDonald taught elementary school, including physical education, and later ESL (English as a Second Language) for many years in Ottawa, Winnipeg and Mexico. She also taught swimming and quilting, and coached competitive swimming.

== Archival records ==
MacDonald started documenting her sports activity in 1947 at age 15 in a series of scrapbooks that grew to 280 pages by 1958, including separate books for each of her five international track and field competitions.

On viewing the scrapbooks, sports historian Anne Hall urged her to preserve them. In 2012 MacDonald donated them to the Archives of the Province of Ontario. In 2014 she added a DVD to the collection which replicates the scrapbook content and adds personal information and a convenient indexing to assist researchers in finding particular information.

In 2015, to celebrate the 2015 Pan American Games in Toronto, the Archives featured excerpts from the scrapbooks in an exhibit entitled "The Spirit of Sport: The Legacy of Jackie MacDonald" in the Archives lobby.

== Bibliography ==
- Sports Illustrated (first issue) August 16, 1954
- Sports Illustrated August 27, 1956
- Who's Who in Canadian Sport, Bob Ferguson, Volume 40, Number 2, November 2009
- "Remembering the 'Forgotten Games': A Reinterpretation of the 1954 British Empire and Commonwealth Games" by Jackie MacDonald and M. Ann Hall, Sport History Review, vol 40 number 2, (2009): pp. 111–125. Human Kinetics Inc. ISSN 1087-1659 (print) ISSN 1543-2947 (online)
- The Girl and the Game: A History of Women's Sport in Canada (second edition) 2016 by M. Ann Hall, University of Toronto Press ISBN 978-1-4426-3413-8 (hardback), ISBN 978-1-4426-3412-1 (paperback) ISBN 978-1-4426-3414-5 (html) ISBN 978-1-4426-3415-2 (pdf)
- Lloyd Percival: Coach and Visionary 2013 by Gary Mossman, Seraphin Editions, ISBN 978-1-927079-18-8 (pbk)
- The Miracle Mile: Stories of the 1954 British Empire and Commonwealth Games 2016 by Jason Beck, Caitlan Press Inc. ISBN 978-1-987915-00-6 (pbk)
- Ladies Don’t Do That! Memoir of an Olympian 2023 by Jackie MacDonald, FriesenPress ISBN 978-1-03-914780-5 (Hardcover) ISBN 978-1-03-914780-5 (Paperback) ISBN 978-1-03-914781-2 (eBook)
