= Galina Popova =

Soviet-Russian sprinter

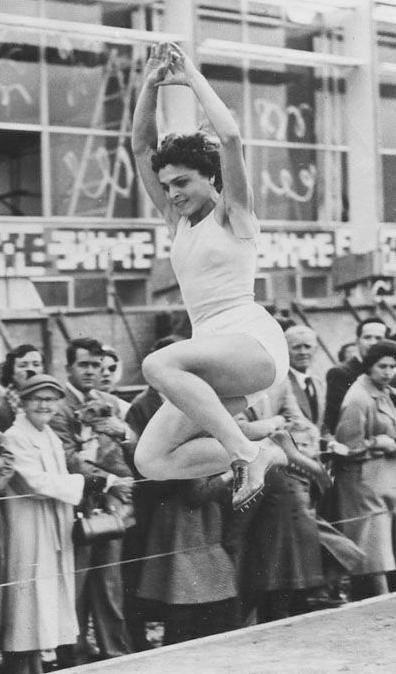
- Popova in Australia in 1956

Personal information
- Born: Vinogradova; 2 June 1932 Moscow, Russian SFSR, Soviet Union
- Died: 17 December 2017 (aged 85)
- Height: 162 cm (5 ft 4 in)
- Weight: 53 kg (117 lb)

Sport
- Sport: Athletics
- Event(s): 100 m, 200 m, long jump
- Club: Burevestnik Leningrad
- Coached by: D. P. Ionov

Achievements and titles
- Personal best(s): 100 m – 11.4 (1959); 200 m – 23.4 (1963); LJ – 6.31 m (1955)
Medal record
Representing Soviet Union
Universiade
Silver medal – second place	1957 Paris	100 m
Silver medal – second place	1961 Sofia	100 m

Galina Mikhailovna Popova (Russian: Галина Михайловна Попова; née Vinogradova 2 June 1932 – 17 December 2017) was a Russian track athlete. She competed in the 100 metres at the 1956 and 1964 Summer Olympics, but failed to reach the finals. In 1954 she equaled the European record over 100 m (11.5) four times, and in 1956 she set two world records in the long jump.

Popova took up athletics in 1951 and was a member of the Soviet national team between 1953 and 1964. After retiring from competitions in 1964 she worked at the Lesgaft University, where in 1971 she defended a PhD on "Gas exchange and oxygenation of arterial blood during muscular load of maximum intensity".
