= Maureen Rever =

Canadian sprinter (born 1938)

Personal information
- Born: Maureen Rever; 21 July 1938 (age 87) Regina, Saskatchewan, Canada

Sport
- Sport: Sprinting
- Event: 100 metres
Medal record
Women's athletics
Representing Canada
Pan American Games
Bronze medal – third place	1959 Chicago	4×100 metres relay
British Empire and Commonwealth Games
Bronze medal – third place	1958 Cardiff	4×110 yards relay

Maureen Rever (born 21 July 1938 in Regina) is a Canadian sprinter. She competed in the women's 100 metres at the 1956 Summer Olympics. She finished third in the 1958 British Empire and Commonwealth Games 4×110 yards relay (with Diane Matheson, Eleanor Haslam, and Freyda Berman) and third in the 1959 Pan American Games 4×100 metres relay (with Sally McCallum, Valerie Jerome, and Heather Campbell). In the 1958 British Empire and Commonwealth Games Rever was eliminated in the semi-finals of the 220 yards and in the heats of the 100 yards. She also finished fourth in the 1959 Pan American Games long jump. She attended Luther College high school in Regina, Saskatchewan.
