= Marlene Mathews =

Australian sprinter (born 1934)

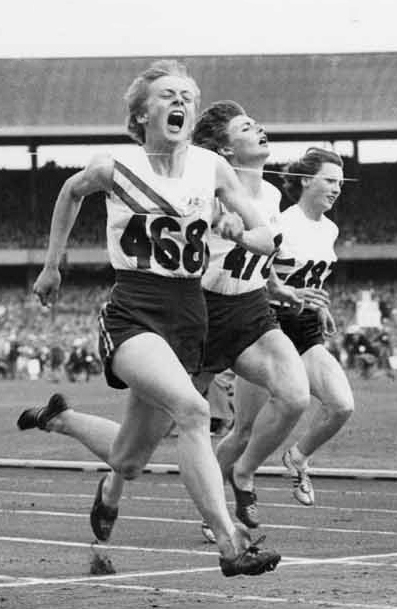
- Mathews (center) at the 1956 Olympics

Personal information
- Born: 14 July 1934 (age 91) Sydney, New South Wales
- Height: 170 cm (5 ft 7 in)
- Weight: 64 kg (141 lb)

Sport
- Sport: Athletics
- Event: Sprint
- Club: Western Suburbs AAC, Sydney

Achievements and titles
- Personal bests: 100 m – 11.4 (1956); 200 m – 23.3 (1958); 400 m – 56.7 (1957)
Medal record
Representing Australia
Olympic Games
Bronze medal – third place	1956 Melbourne	100 metres
Bronze medal – third place	1956 Melbourne	200 metres
Commonwealth Games
Gold medal – first place	1958 Cardiff	100 yards
Gold medal – first place	1958 Cardiff	220 yards
Silver medal – second place	1958 Cardiff	4×110y relay

Marlene Judith Mathews AO (later Willard; born 14 July 1934) is a retired Australian Olympic sprinter. She has been described as 'one of Australia's greatest and unluckiest' champions.

== Early career ==
Mathews attended Fort Street High School in Sydney and began competing in athletics in the late 1940s.

At the 1950 Australian Championships, she placed fourth, behind Shirley Strickland, in the 80 m hurdles and ran in the winning state relay team, but was not selected for the 1950 British Empire Games team.

A few days after her 16th birthday at the NSW Championships, she ran a great race at the New South Wales Championships 100 yards final, placing second to world record-holder Marjorie Jackson and beating four members of the Australian Empire Games team, including Olympic medalist Strickland.

Mathews was considered a certainty to gain selection to the 1952 Summer Olympics before a leg injury forced her out of competition.

== International career ==
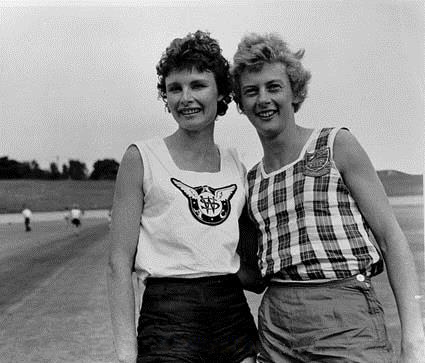
Matthews (left) in 1960 with Betty Cuthbert

In 1954, recovered from her injuries, Mathews ran second to Jackson in the National 100 yards championship (and third in the 220 yards) and was duly selected to run in her first international championships at the 1954 British Empire and Commonwealth Games in Vancouver. She was unlucky again, breaking down injured in her heat of the 100 yards.

At the 1956 Olympics in Melbourne, she won two bronze medals, over 100 metres and 200 metres. In both races she was beaten by countrywoman Betty Cuthbert (gold) and German Christa Stubnick (silver).

In a controversial move, she was left out of the gold-medal winning Australian 4×100 metres relay team as she was 'not considered a good relay runner" but soon after the Games she assisted an Australian team to world records for 4×200 metres and 4×220 yards relay events.

She proved her versatility in the sprint events by setting a new world record at 400 metres with 57.0 seconds on 6 January 1957.

On 20 March 1958, at the Australian Championships, she set a new world record over 100 yards with 10.3 seconds, and two days later she ran 220 yards in 23.4 seconds, which was also a world record. In both races, she defeated world-record holder and Olympic champion Cuthbert.

At the 1958 Commonwealth Games in Cardiff, Wales, Mathews took out the 100 yards and 220 yards, again beating Cuthbert. She was ranked #1 in the world for both 100 metres and 200 metres in both 1957 and 1958.

Mathews' final top-level competition was at the 1960 Olympics in Rome, where she was eliminated in the 100 metres semi-finals.

== Personal details and honours ==
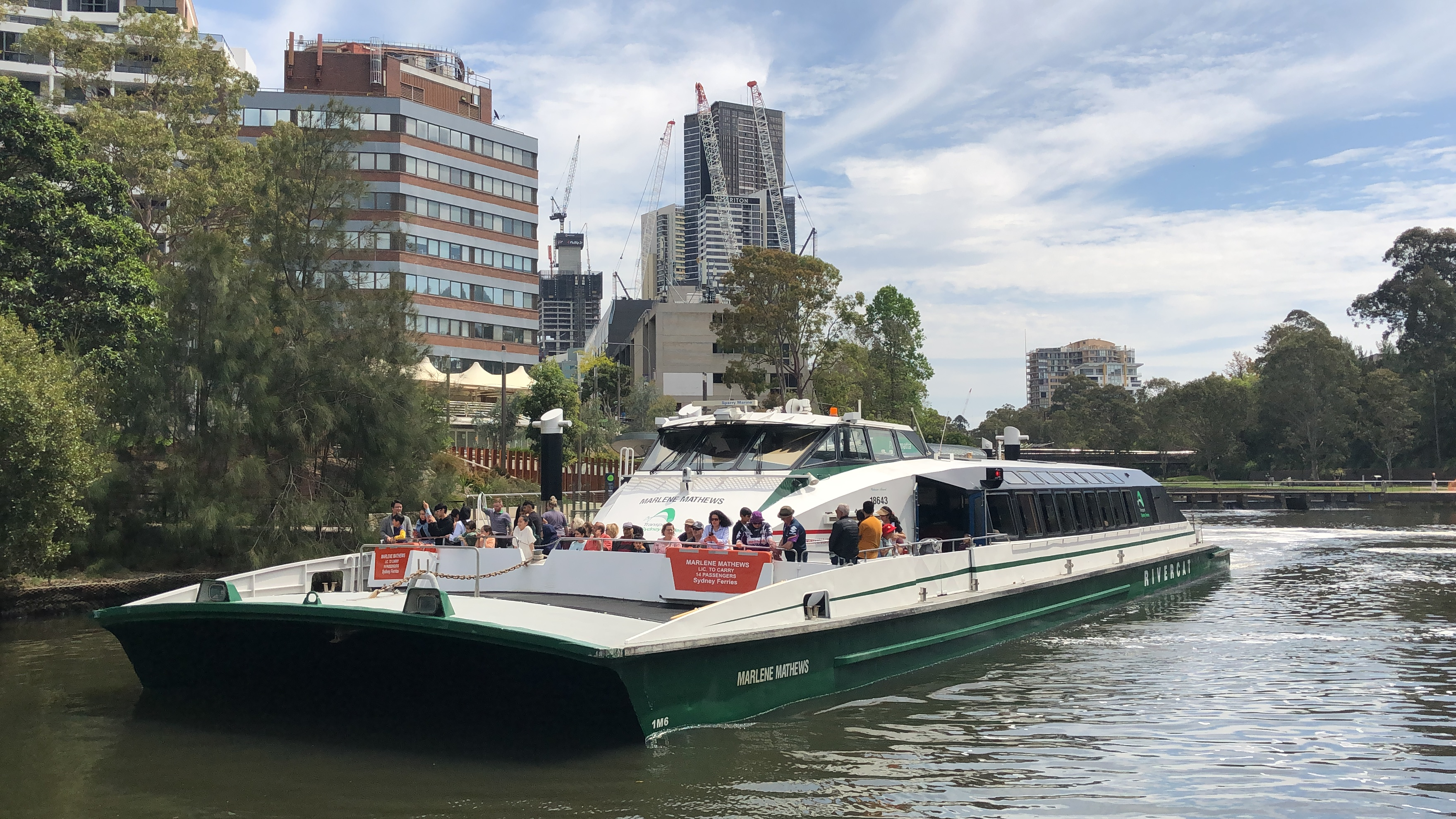
MV Marlene Matthews RiverCat departing Parramatta ferry wharf.

Mathews married fireman Barry Willard in 1958 but they later separated. She was an assistant manager of the Australian Olympic Team at the 1972 Olympics in Munich. She became a Member of the Order of Australia (AM) in 1979 for her services to athletics, and an Officer of the Order of Australia (AO) in 1999. Mathews was inducted into the Sport Australia Hall of Fame in 1985 and into the Athletics Australia Hall of Fame in 2010. In 1993, the State Transit Authority named a RiverCat ferry after Mathews. In February 2025 Rivercat "Marlene Mathews" was retired from service before being scrapped in July 2025. In 2018 a bronze sculpture of her (and one of Betty Cuthbert) was unveiled at the Sydney Cricket Ground in Sydney, Australia. This makes them the first female athletes added to the bronze sculptures in the Sydney Cricket Ground precinct.

== Statistics ==
Personal bests

Event	Time	Wind	Place	Date
100 y	10.3	0.0	Sydney, Australia	20 March 1958
100 m	11.5	–	Sydney, Australia	10 March 1956
200 m	23.4	0.0	Sydney, Australia	22 March 1958
220 y	23.4	0.0	Sydney, Australia	22 March 1958
400 m	57.0	–	Sydney, Australia	6 January 1957
440 y	57.0	–	Sydney, Australia	6 January 1957

World Records

Event	Time	Place	Date
100 y	10.3	Sydney, Australia	20 March 1958
200 m	23.4	Sydney, Australia	22 March 1958
400 m	57.0	Sydney, Australia	6 January 1957
440 y	57.0	Sydney, Australia	6 January 1957
4 × 200 m	1–36.3	Sydney, Australia	5 December 1956
4 × 220 y	1–36.3	Sydney, Australia	5 December 1956

World Rankings – 100m and 200m – rankings commenced in 1956.

Year	Event	Ranking
1956	100m	3
	200m	4
1957	100m	1
	200m	1
1958	100m	1
	200m	1
1959	100m	2
1960	100m	9

Australian Championships Record – prior to 1963 Championships were held every two years

Year	100y	220y	80m hurdles	4×110y relay
1950	–	–	4	1
1952	–	–	–	–
1954	2	3	–	1
1956	3	2	–	1
1958	1	1	–	1
1960	3	DNQ	–	2
