= Franca Peggion =

Italian pentathlete

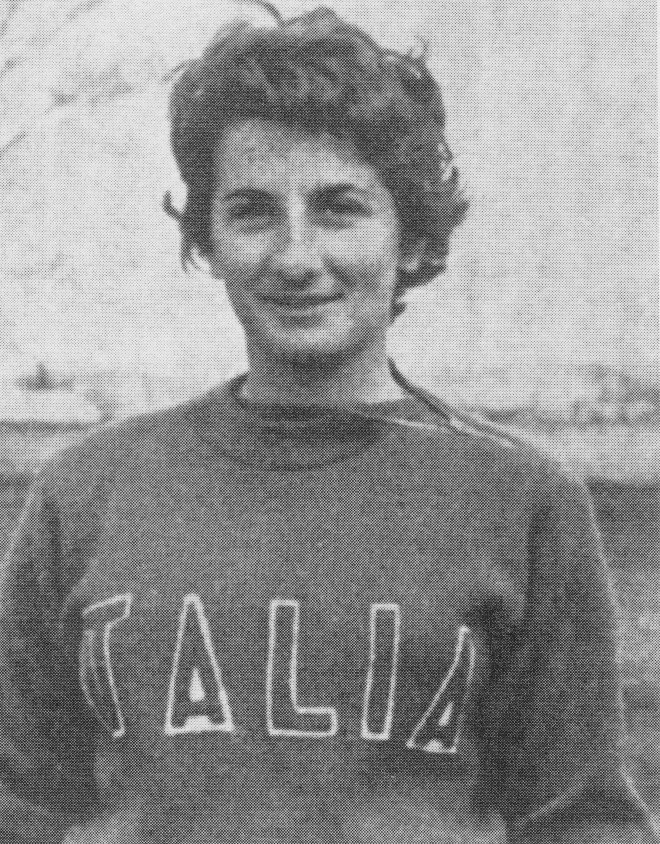
- Peggion in 1950s

Personal information
- National team: Italy: 4 (1956-1958)
- Born: 14 January 1934 (age 92) San Giorgio delle Pertiche, Italy

Sport
- Sport: Athletics
- Event: Pentathlon

Achievements and titles
- Personal best: 100 m: 12.0 (1956)

Franca Peggion (born 14 January 1934) is a former Italian pentathlete.

== Career ==
She competed in the women's 100 metres at the 1956 Summer Olympics.
