= Inge Fuhrmann =

German sprinter

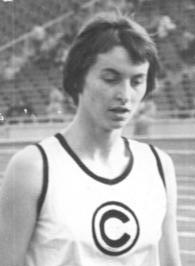
- Inge Fuhrmann, 1956

Personal information
- Nationality: German
- Born: 11 May 1936 (age 90) Küstrin, Germany

Sport
- Sport: Sprinting
- Event: 100 metres
Medal record
Representing West Germany
Summer Universiade
Bronze medal – third place	1959 Turin	4x100m relay

Ingeborg "Inge" Fuhrmann (born 11 May 1936) is a German sprinter. She competed in the women's 100 metres at the 1956 Summer Olympics.
