= Eleanor Haslam =

Canadian sprinter (born 1939)

Personal information
- Born: 11 September 1939 (age 86) Saskatoon, Saskatchewan, Canada

Sport
- Sport: Sprinting
- Event: 100 metres
Medal record
Women's athletics
Representing Canada
British Empire and Commonwealth Games
Bronze medal – third place	1958 Cardiff	4×110 yards relay

Eleanor Jean Haslam (later Jensen; born 11 September 1939) is a Canadian sprinter. She competed in the 100 metres at the 1956 Summer Olympics and the 1960 Summer Olympics. She finished third in the 1958 British Empire and Commonwealth Games 4×110 yards relay (with Diane Matheson, Maureen Rever, and Freyda Berman). Haslam also finished sixth in the 220 yards and was eliminated in the heats of the 100 yards at the 1958 British Empire and Commonwealth Games.
