= Margaret Stuart (athlete) =

New Zealand sprinter

Personal information
- Nationality: New Zealand
- Born: 5 June 1934 Hastings, New Zealand
- Died: 10 September 1999 (aged 65)

Sport
- Sport: Sprinting
- Event: 100 metres

Margaret Fiona Stuart (later Wall, 5 June 1934 – 10 September 1999) was a New Zealand sprinter. She competed in the women's 100 metres at the 1956 Summer Olympics.
