= Athletics at the 1958 British Empire and Commonwealth Games =

Athletics at the 6th British Empire and Commonwealth Games
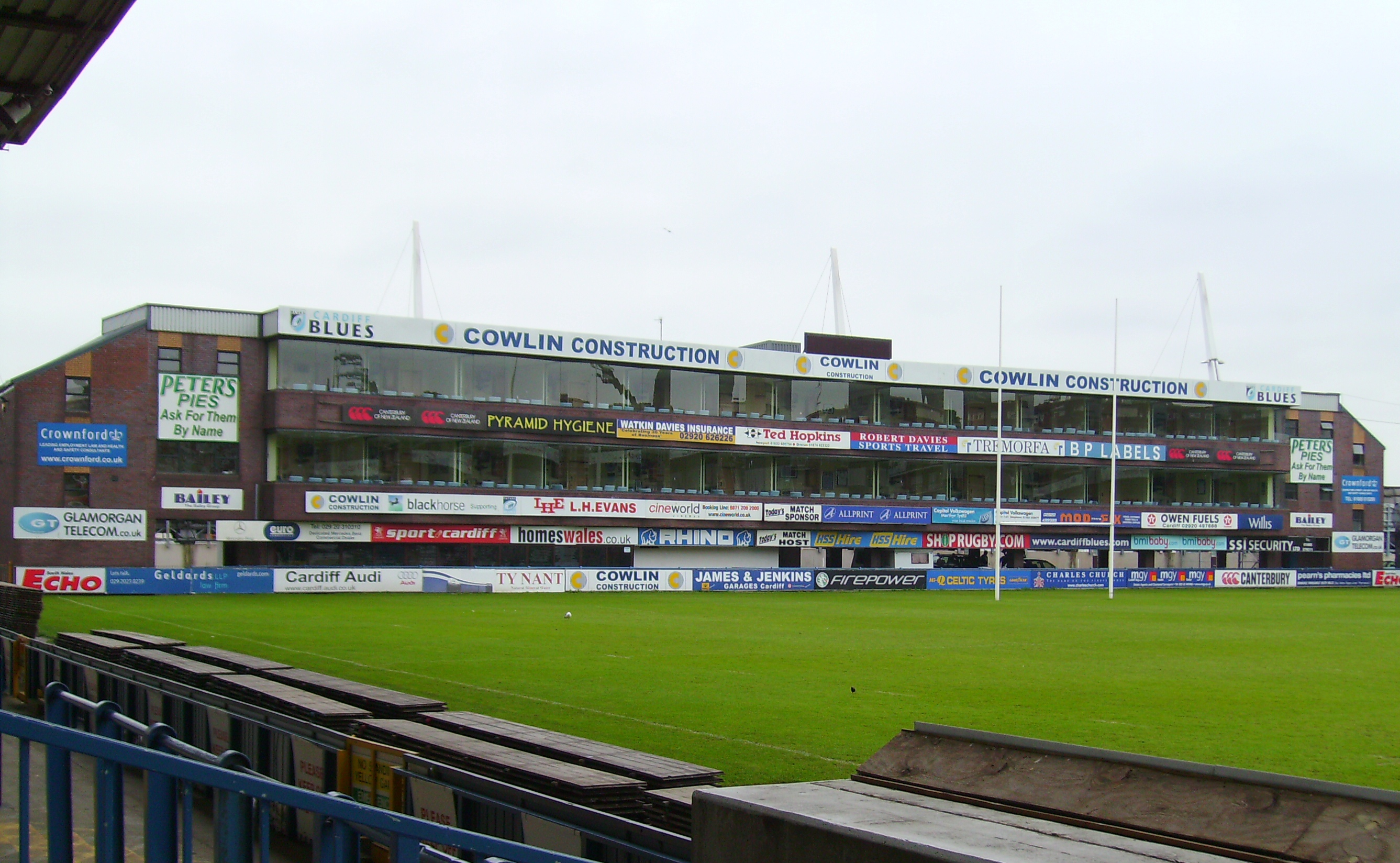
- The now-modernised Cardiff Arms Park.
- Dates: 18–26 July 1958
- Host city: Cardiff, Wales
- Venue: Cardiff Arms Park
- Level: Senior
- Events: 29
- Participation: 424 athletes from 32 nations
- Records set: 3 WR

At the 1958 British Empire and Commonwealth Games, the athletics events were held at Cardiff Arms Park in Cardiff, Wales in July 1958. A total of 29 athletics events were contested at the Games, 20 by men and 9 by women. Four Games records were improved during the competition and three world records were set (at 440 yards hurdles, women's javelin, women's 4 × 110 yards relay).

== Medal summary ==
=== Men ===
Medallists in men's athletics by event with link to details; also times, heights and distances
Event	Gold		Silver		Bronze	
100 yards	Keith Gardner (JAM)	9.66	Tom Robinson (BAH)	9.69	Mike Agostini (TRI)	9.79
220 yards	Tom Robinson (BAH)	21.08	Keith Gardner (JAM)	21.11	Gordon Day (SAF)	21.15
440 yards	Milkha Singh (IND)	46.71	Malcolm Spence (SAF)	46.9	Terry Tobacco (CAN)	47.05
880 yards	Herb Elliott (AUS)	1:49.32	Brian Hewson (ENG)	1:49.47	Mike Rawson (ENG)	1:50.94
1 mile	Herb Elliott (AUS)	3:59.03	Merv Lincoln (AUS)	4:01.80	Albie Thomas (AUS)	4:02.77
3 miles	Murray Halberg (NZL)	13:14.96	Albie Thomas (AUS)	13:24.37	Neville Scott (NZL)	13:26.06
6 miles	Dave Power (AUS)	28:48.16	John Merriman (WAL)	28:48.84	Arere Anentia (KEN)	28:51.48
Marathon	Dave Power (AUS)	2:22:46	Johannes Barnard (SAF)	2:22:58	Peter Wilkinson (ENG)	2:24:42
120 yards hurdles (wind: +3.5 m/s)	Keith Gardner (JAM)	14.20w	Jacobus Swart (SAF)	14.30w	Ghulam Raziq (PAK)	14.32w
440 yards hurdles	Gert Potgieter (SAF)	49.73 (WR) GR	David Lean (AUS)	50.59	Bartonjo Rotich (KEN)	51.75
4 × 110 yards relay	England; Peter Radford; Roy Sandstrom; David Segal; Adrian Breacker	40.72	Nigeria; Thomas Obi; Jimmy Omagbemi; Victor Odofin; Smart Akrara	41.05	Australia; Jim McCann; Hector Hogan; Terry Gale; Kevan Gosper	41.64
4 × 440 yards relay	South Africa; Gordon Day; Gerald Evans; Gert Potgieter; Malcolm Spence	3:08.21	England; Ted Sampson; John Wrighton; John Salisbury; Derek Johnson	3:09.61	Jamaica; Gerald James; Malcolm Spence; George Kerr; Keith Gardner	3:10.08
High jump	Ernle Haisley (JAM)	2.06 m	Chilla Porter (AUS)	2.03 m	Robert Kotei (GHA)	2.01 m
Pole vault	Geoff Elliott (ENG)	4.17 m	Robert Reid (CAN)	4.17 m	Merv Richards (NZL)	4.17 m
Long jump	Paul Foreman (JAM)	7.47 m	Deryck Taylor (JAM)	7.47 m	Muhammad Ramzan Ali (PAK)	7.33 m
Triple jump	Ian Tomlinson (AUS)	15.74 m (w)	Jack Smyth (CAN)	15.69 m	Dave Norris (NZL)	15.45 m
Shot put	Arthur Rowe (ENG)	17.58 m	Martyn Lucking (ENG)	16.50 m	Barry Donath (AUS)	15.79 m
Discus throw	Fanie du Plessis (SAF)	55.94 m	Les Mills (NZL)	51.73 m	Gerry Carr (ENG)	51.63 m
Hammer throw	Mike Ellis (ENG)	62.90 m	Muhammad Iqbal (PAK)	61.70 m	Peter Allday (ENG)	57.58 m
Javelin throw	Colin Smith (ENG)	71.29 m	Jalal Khan (PAK)	70.83 m	Hans Moks (CAN)	70.41 m

=== Women ===
Medallists in women's athletics by event with link to details; also times, heights and distances
Event	Gold		Silver		Bronze	
100 yards (wind: +0.3 m/s)	Marlene Willard (AUS)	10.7	Heather Young (ENG)	10.73	Madeleine Weston (ENG)	10.81
220 yards	Marlene Willard (AUS)	23.65 GR	Betty Cuthbert (AUS)	23.77	Heather Young (ENG)	23.9
80 metres hurdles (wind: +4.9 m/s)	Norma Thrower (AUS)	10.72w	Carole Quinton (ENG)	10.77w	Gloria Wigney (AUS)	10.94w
4 × 110 yards relay	England; Heather Young; June Paul; Dorothy Hyman; Madeleine Weston	45.37 (WR)	Australia; Betty Cuthbert; Kay Johnson; Wendy Hayes; Marlene Mathews-Willard	46.12	Canada; Diane Matheson; Eleanor Haslam; Maureen Rever; Freyda Berman	47.21
High jump	Michele Mason (AUS)	1.70 m	Mary Donaghy (NZL)	1.70 m	Helen Frith (AUS)	1.65 m
Long jump	Sheila Hoskin (ENG)	6.02 m (w)	Mary Bignal (ENG)	5.97 m (w)	Bev Watson (AUS)	5.97 m (w)
Shot put	Val Sloper (NZL)	15.54 m	Suzanne Allday (ENG)	14.44 m	Jackie Gelling (CAN)	14.03 m
Discus throw	Suzanne Allday (ENG)	45.91 m	Jennifer Thompson (NZL)	45.29 m	Val Sloper (NZL)	44.93 m
Javelin throw	Anna Pazera (AUS)	57.40 m (WR)	Magdalena Swanepoel (SAF)	48.73 m	Averil Williams (ENG)	46.78 m

== Medal table ==
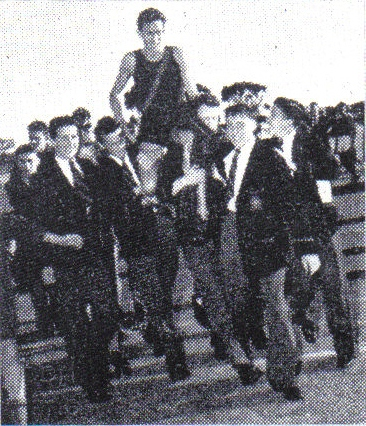
Australia's Herb Elliott scored double gold with wins in the 880 yards and mile run.

* Host nation (Wales)

Medals won by nation, ranked and sortable, with totals
Rank	Nation	Gold	Silver	Bronze	Total
1	Australia (AUS)	10	6	6	22
2	England (ENG)	8	7	7	22
3	Jamaica (JAM)	4	2	1	7
4	South Africa (SAF)	3	4	1	8
5	New Zealand (NZL)	2	3	4	9
6	Bahamas (BAH)	1	1	0	2
7	India (IND)	1	0	0	1
8	Canada (CAN)	0	2	5	7
9	Pakistan (PAK)	0	2	2	4
10	Nigeria (NGR)	0	1	0	1
10	Wales (WAL)*	0	1	0	1
12	Kenya (KEN)	0	0	2	2
13	Ghana (GHA)	0	0	1	1
Totals (13 entries)		29	29	29	87

== Participating nations ==
- Australia (29)
- Bahamas (1)
- British Guiana (10)
- Canada (23)
- Ceylon (2)
- England (88)
- Fiji (3)
- Ghana (10)
- Gibraltar (2)
- Hong Kong (1)
- India (12)
- Isle of Man (3)
- Jamaica (8)
- Jersey (2)
- Kenya (10)
- Malaya (1)
- Mauritius (4)
- New Zealand (19)
- Nigeria (30)
- North Borneo (1)
- Northern Ireland (19)
- Pakistan (13)
- Saint Vincent and the Grenadines (2)
- Sarawak (3)
- Scotland (38)
- Sierra Leone (9)
- Singapore (1)
- South Africa (19)
- Southern Rhodesia (5)
- Trinidad and Tobago (8)
- Uganda (6)
- Wales (42)
