= Jody Smith =

British sprinter (born 2000)

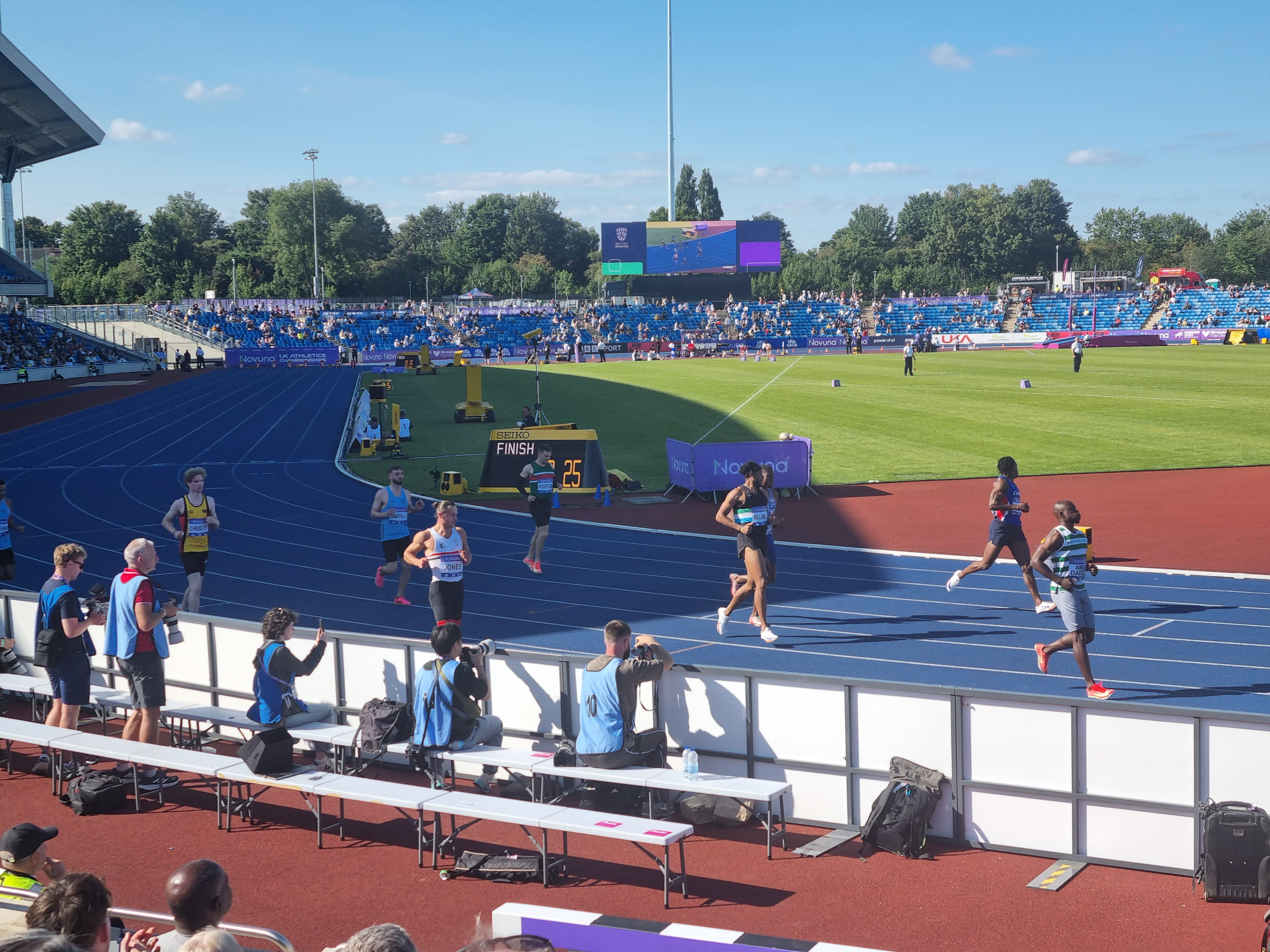
- Smith at the 2025 UK Champs

Personal information
- Nationality: British
- Born: 17 September 2000 (age 25) Leicestershire

Sport
- Sport: Athletics
- Event: Sprint
- Club: Thames Valley Harriers

Achievements and titles
- Personal best(s): 60m: 6.52 (Loughborough, 2025); 100m: 10.40 (Birmingham, 2024)

Jody Smith (born 17 September 2000) is a British sprinter. He placed third over 60 metres at the 2026 British Indoor Athletics Championships and was selected to represent Great Britain at the 2026 World Athletics Indoor Championships.

== Biography ==
As a junior athlete, Smith competed in sprint events at English schools and represented England Midlands at The Welsh International.

Smith was a semi-finalist at the 2025 British Indoor Athletics Championships in Birmingham in February 2025, running 6.76 seconds for the 60 metres in both his heat and semi-final. Smith was also a semi-finalist in the 100 metres at the 2025 UK Athletics Championships in Birmingham on 2 August.

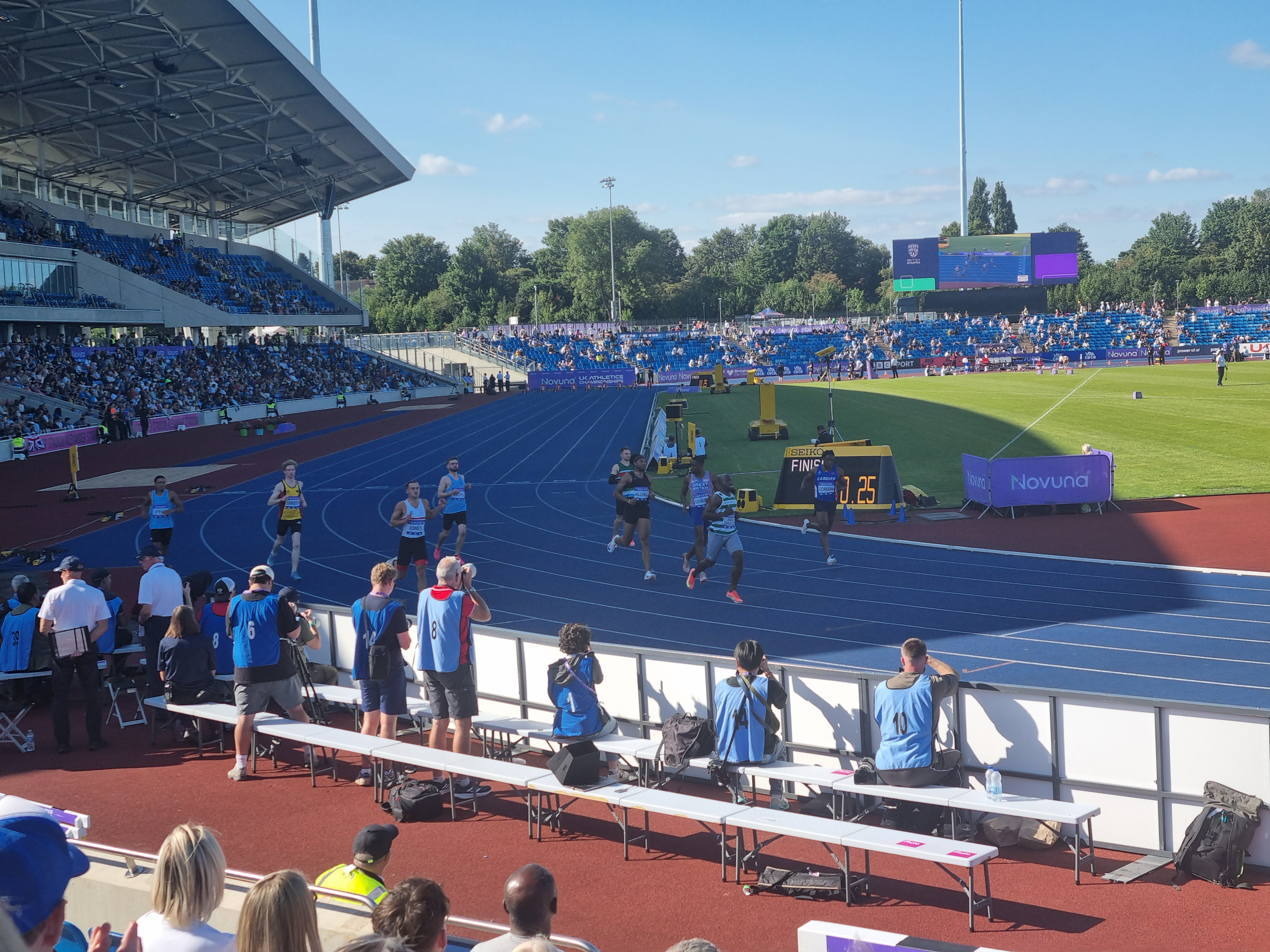

A member of Thames Valley Harriers, Smith ran a succession of race times which met the automatic qualifying standard for the 60 metres for the upcoming 2026 World Indoors Championships during the indoor season of 2025-26. In December 2025, Smith ran a personal best 6.52 seconds for the 60 metres. The following month, he backed-up that performance with runs of 6.57 seconds for the 60 metres in Loughborough and 6.58 seconds at the BAUHAUS-galan Indoor in Stockholm, Sweden.

Smith placed third in the final of the 60 metres at the 2026 British Indoor Athletics Championships in Birmingham on 14 February 2026, finishing behind Jeremiah Azu and Romell Glave, running 6.63 seconds in the final. He was subsequently named for the 60 metres in the British squad for the 2026 World Athletics Indoor Championships in Poland. At the championships on 20 March in Toruń, Smith placed fourth in his heat won by Jordan Anthony, with Smith's time of 6.65 seconds not enough to advance.

Smith was named in the British squad for the 4 x 100 metres relay at the 2026 World Athletics Relays in Gaborone, Botswana. In May, he won over 100 metres competing for Thames Valley Harriers in the National Athletics League opener in Derby. On 20 June, he was a semi-finalist in the 100 metres at the 2026 UK Athletics Championships.
