= 2022 British Athletics Championships =

British Athletics Championships in 2022

- Dates: 24–26 June
- Host city: Manchester, United Kingdom
- Venue: Manchester Regional Arena
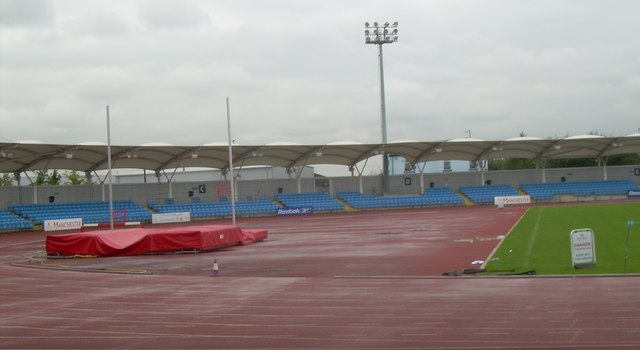
- Level: Senior
- Type: Outdoor

The 2022 British Athletics Championships was the national championships in outdoor track and field for athletes in the United Kingdom, which also served as a qualifying event for the 2022 World Athletics Championships.

== Background ==
The 2022 British Athletics Championships were held from the 24–24 June 2022 at the Manchester Regional Arena. The event was used to determine British qualifiers for the 2022 World Athletics Championships. The Championships were broadcast on the BBC Sport website.

The British title for the 10,000 metres event was held in May 2022 at the Night of the 10,000m PBs event. The women's race was won by Jessica Judd, who qualified for the World Championships as a result. The men's competition was won by Italian Yeman Crippa, with Sam Atkin as the highest finishing Briton, and thus the British title winner.

== Highlights ==
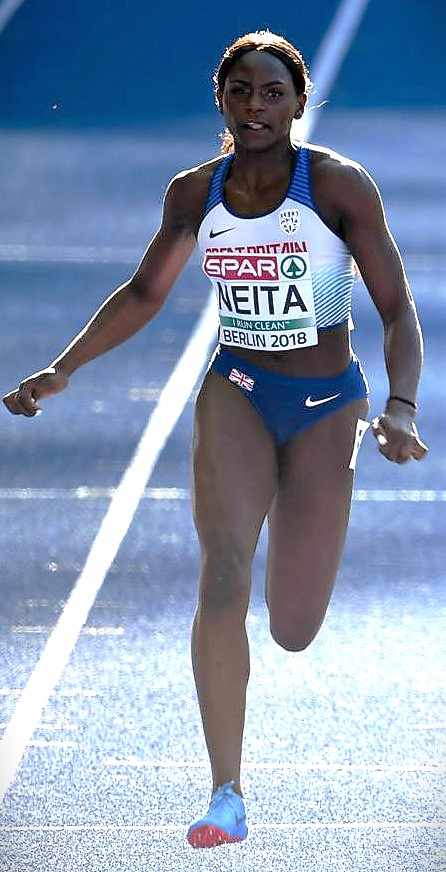
Daryll Neita, pictured here in 2018, won the women's 100 and 200 metres events.

Daryll Neita won the women's 100 and 200 metres events, the first time since 2010 that a woman had won both races at the same British Athletics Championships. Neita missed the qualifying time for the 200 metres event at the 2022 World Athletics Championships by 0.01 seconds; her times at these Championships were excluded from the qualification criteria as both races had a large tail wind. Jeremiah Azu won the men's 100 metres event, and both Neita and Azu's victories were considered upsets, as Dina Asher-Smith and Reece Prescod were considered the favourites for the events. Nethaneel Mitchell-Blake won the men's 200 metres event in a championship record time of 20.05 seconds. Victoria Ohuruogu, the sister of former Olympic gold medallist Christine, won the 400 metres event. Matthew Hudson-Smith won the men's 400 metres race in a British Championships record time of 44.92 seconds. Tade Ojora won the men's 110 metres hurdles event for the second consecutive year, but also missed out on qualifying for the World Championships due to a large tail wind.

In the field events, Holly Bradshaw won her tenth pole vault championship. Charlotte Payne won the hammer throw event with the third best throw by a British woman in history. Jade Lally won her eighth British discus throw title, and Lorraine Ugen won her fifth British long jump title. Elliot Thompson, the son of Daley Thompson, won the decathlon event. It was his first British title.

The 400 metres wheelchair events were won by Nathan Maguire and Hannah Cockroft respectively. Melanie Woods and Eden Rainbow-Cooper finished second and third respectively in the women's race.

== Results ==
=== Men ===
Event	Gold		Silver		Bronze	
100 metres	Jeremiah Azu	9.90	Reece Prescod	9.94	Zharnel Hughes	9.97
200 metres	Nethaneel Mitchell-Blake	20.05 CR	Joe Ferguson	20.23 PB	Jeriel Quainoo	20.40 PB
400 metres	Matthew Hudson-Smith	44.92	Lewis Davey	46.18 PB	Rio Mitcham	46.22 PB
800 metres	Max Burgin	1:44.54	Daniel Rowden	1:45.58 SB	Kyle Langford	1:46.34
1500 metres	Jake Wightman	3:40.26	Neil Gourley	3:40.38	Josh Kerr	3:40.63
5000 metres	Marc Scott	13:42.83	James West	13:44.47 PB	Jack Rowe	13:45.30
10,000 metres (Note: The 10,000 metres events were held in May 2022.)	Sam Atkin	27:31.98	Emile Cairess	27:34.08 PB	Ben Connor	27:51.82 PB
110 metres hurdles	Tade Ojora	13.27	Joshua Zeller	13.31	David King	13.38
400 metres hurdles	Alastair Chalmers	49.21	Chris McAlister	49.40	Jacob Paul	49.89
3000 metres steeplechase	Jamaine Coleman	8:27:01 PB	Zak Seddon	8:28.26	Phil Norman	8:34.47
5000 metres walk	Tom Bosworth	19:51.21	Christopher Snook	21:20.14	Luc Legon	22:33:18 SB
Long jump	Reynold Banigo	8.00 m	Jack Roach	7.88 m	Samuel Khogali	7.83 m PB
High jump	Joel Clarke-Khan	2.21 m	David Smith	2.18 m	Kelechi Aguocha	2.18 m PB
Triple jump	Ben Williams	16.76 m	Jude Bright-Davies	16.10 m	Seun Okome	16.09 m
Pole vault	Harry Coppell	5.75 m SB	Adam Hague	5.40 m	Lazarus Benjamin	5.30 m PB
Shot put	Scott Lincoln	20.40 m	Youcef Zatat	18.21 m	Patrick Swan	17.24 m
Discus throw	Nicholas Percy	65.00 m PB	Zane Duquemin	63.76 m PB	Greg Thompson	61.23 m SB
Hammer throw	Nick Miller	73.84 m	Osian Jones	69.68 m	Jake Norris	68.79 m
Javelin throw	James Whiteaker	74.06 m	Benjamin East	73.49 m PB	Daniel Bainbridge	71.35 m
Decathlon	Elliot Thompson	7197	Caius Joseph	7169	Jack Turner	7121

=== Women ===
Event	Gold		Silver		Bronze	
100 metres	Daryll Neita	10.80	Dina Asher-Smith	10.87	Imani Lansiquot	11.03
200 metres	Daryll Neita	22.34	Beth Dobbin	22.49	Imani Lansiquot	22.70
400 metres	Victoria Ohuruogu	51.45	Nicole Yeargin	51.69	Laviai Nielsen	51.97
800 metres	Jemma Reekie	2:06.03	Ellie Baker	2:06.26	Isabelle Boffey	2:06.59
1500 metres	Laura Muir	4:12.91	Melissa Courtney-Bryant	4:17.72	Sabrina Sinha	4:19.76
5000 metres	Amy-Eloise Markovc	15:37.23 SB	Jessica Judd	15:38.39	Sarah Inglis	15:39.55
10,000 metres	Jessica Judd	31:22.26	Amy-Eloise Markovc	31:25.57 PB	Samantha Harrison	31:30.63
100 metres hurdles	Cindy Sember	12.56	Jessica Hunter	12.79	Alicia Barrett	12.98
400 metres hurdles	Jessie Knight	55.08	Lina Nielsen	55.32	Hayley Mclean	56.74
3000 metres steeplechase	Elizabeth Bird	9:46.16	Aimee Pratt	9:49.32	Elise Thorner	9:57.06
5000 metres walk	Bethan Davies	22:30.59	Gracie Griffiths	25:18.40 PB	Abigail Jennings	25:26.23
Long jump	Lorraine Ugen	6.79 m	Jazmin Sawyers	6.67 m	Lucy Hadaway	6.45 m
High jump	Morgan Lake	1.85 m SB	Emily Borthwick	1.85 m	Kate Anson	1.79 m SB
Triple jump	Naomi Metzger	14.17 m	Sineade Gutzmore	13.36 m SB	Lily Hulland	12.84 m
Pole vault	Holly Bradshaw	4.50 m	Molly Caudery	4.50 m	Jade Ivy	4.30 m
Shot put	Adele Nicoll	17.59 m PB	Sophie McKinna	17.49 m SB	Divine Oladipo	17.20 m
Discus throw	Jade Lally	61.42 m	Kirsty Law	55.18 m	Amy Holder	54.54 m
Hammer throw	Charlotte Payne	70.59 m	Jessica Mayho	65.73 m	Katie Head	65.58 m
Javelin throw	Bekah Walton	51.87 m	Emily Dibble	51.54 m PB	Emma Hamplett	49.02 m
Heptathlon	Jodie Smith	5929 CR	Ella Rush	5469	Eloise Hind	5318

=== Parasports – Men ===
Event	Gold		Silver		Bronze	
100 metres ambulant	Zac Shaw	10.66	Thomas Young	10.80	Emmanuel Oyinbo-Coker	11.03
400 metres wheelchair race	Nathan Maguire	51.37	Moatez Jomni	56.44	Isaac Towers	58.47
1500 metres Paralympic race	Steven Bryce	4:11.57	Kieran O'Hara	4:12.67	Daniel Wolff	4:13.23

=== Parasports – Women ===
Event	Gold		Silver		Bronze	
100 metres ambulant	Sophie Hahn	12.82	Ali Smith	13.09	Hetty Bartlett	13.25
400 metres wheelchair race	Hannah Cockroft	58.79	Melanie Woods	1:00.54	Eden Rainbow-Cooper	1:05.88
