= Grace Vans Agnew =

British athlete (born 2000)

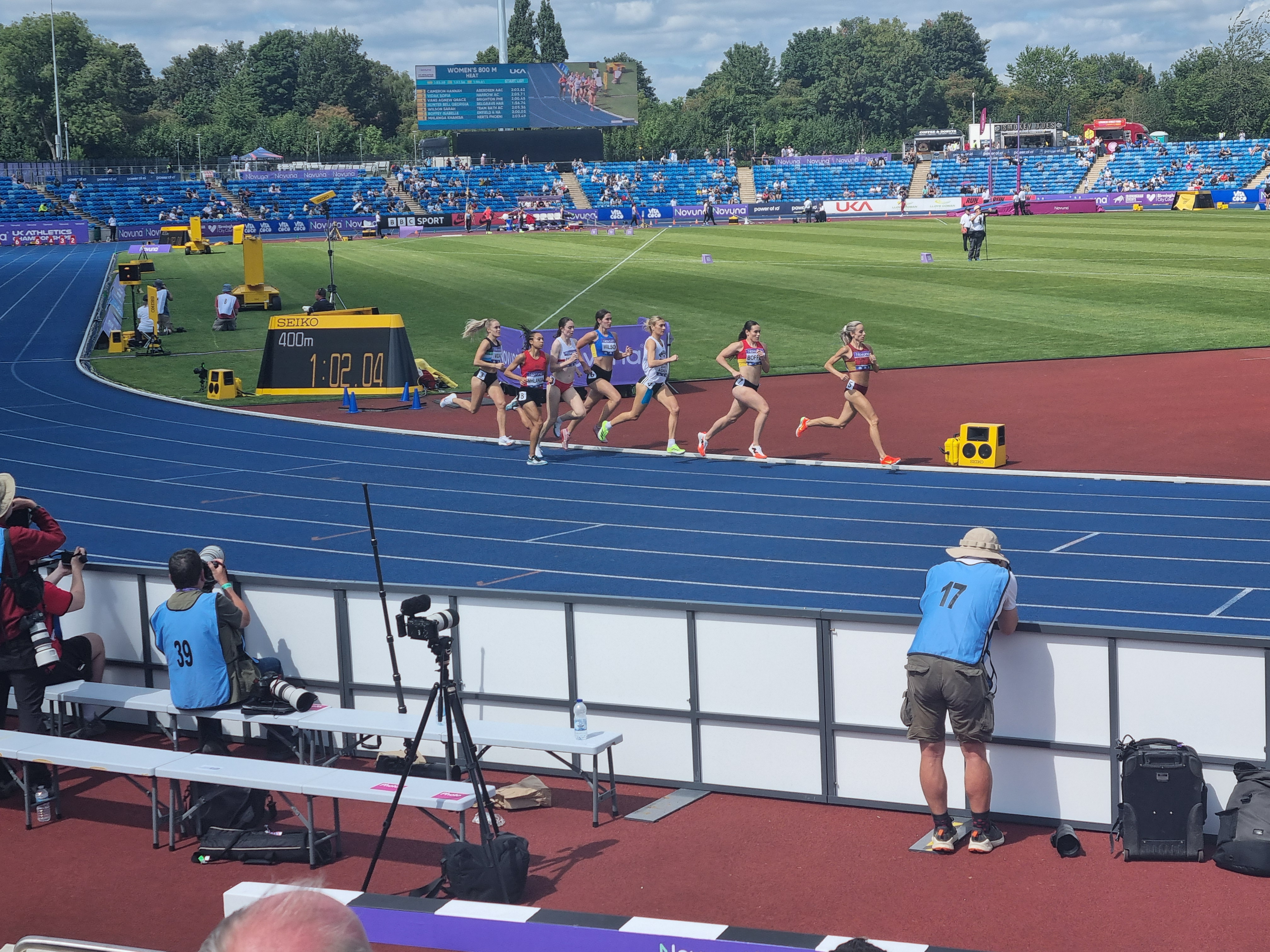
- Vans Agnew at the 2025 UK Championships

Personal information
- Nationality: British
- Born: 30 December 2000 (age 25)

Sport
- Sport: Athletics
- Event: Middle distance runner

Achievements and titles
- Personal best: 800m: 2:00.45 (2025)

Grace Vans Agnew (born 30 December 2000) is a British middle-distance runner. She was runner-up over 800 metres at the 2025 British Indoor Athletics Championships.

== Early life ==
She is from Sussex. She was schooled at Millfield in Somerset. She later studied sport and exercise at St Mary's University, Twickenham in London.

== Career ==
Running for Ouse Valley in the 400 metres hurdles, she won the bronze medals respectively at the South of England championships in 2019. That year, at the Sussex Track and Field Championship she set a county record for the U20 women's 400 hurdles, running 62.05 seconds.

In May 2024, she ran a new personal best time of 2:01.21 for the 800 metres whilst competing in Belfast. That month, she was selected to represent England at the Loughborough International. In June 2024, she finished in fifth place at the British Athletics Championships in Manchester over 80 metres.

She set an indoor 800 metres personal best of 2:02.81 in February 2025 in Lee Valley, London. She finished second behind Isabelle Boffey in the final of the 800 metres at the 2025 British Indoor Athletics Championships in Birmingham in a time of 2:04.28. She won the women's 800m B-race in an indoor best of 2:02.20 at the Madrid World Athletics Indoor Tour Gold meeting on 28 February 2025, in Spain.

She was selected for the British team for the 2025 European Athletics Indoor Championships in Apeldoorn, Netherlands. Competing in the 800 metres at the championships, she ran a time of 2:08.87 in her qualifying heat to finish in third place and did not progress to the semi-finals.

On 3 August, she finished in fifth place in the final of the 800 metres at the 2025 UK Athletics Championships in Birmingham.

In June 2026, she reached the final of the 800 metres at the 2026 British Championships, winning her semi-final prior to placing fourth overall with 2:00.94 in the final. In July, she finished second in the 800 m to Nina Vuković with 2:00.93 at the Cork City Sports in Ireland.
