= Kimani Jack =

British high jumper (born 2004)

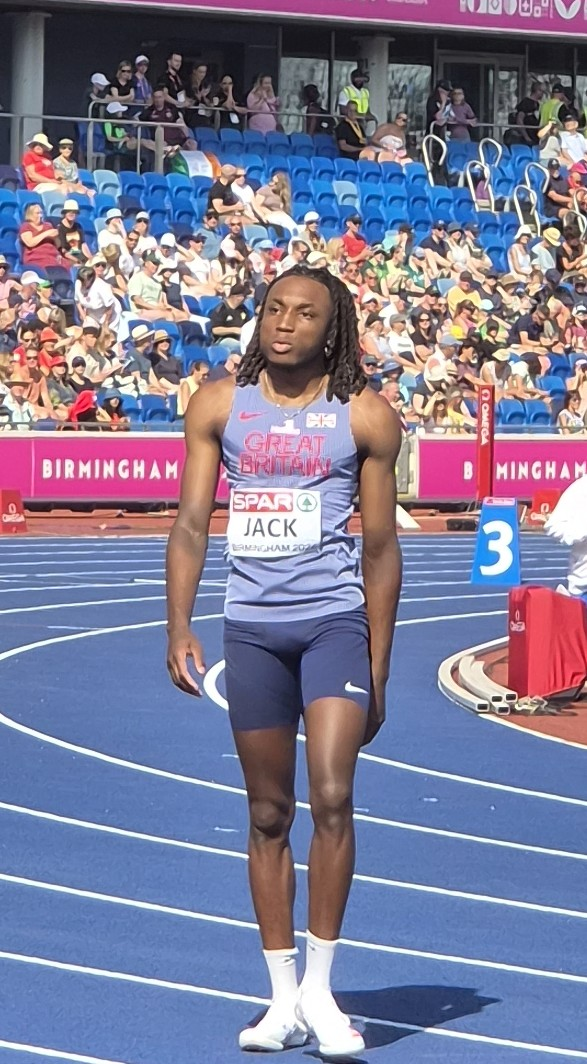
- Kimani at the 2026 European Championships

Personal information
- Nationality: British (English)
- Born: 31 January 2004 (age 22) London
- Education: St Albans School, Hertfordshire; University of Birmingham; University of Georgia
- Height: 6 ft 2 in (188 cm)

Sport
- Sport: Athletics
- Event: High jump

Achievements and titles
- Personal best: High jump: 2:31 m (2026)
Medal record
Men's athletics
Representing England
Commonwealth Games
Bronze medal – third place	2026 Glasgow	High jump

Kimani Jack (born 31 January 2004) is a British high jumper. He made his senior debut representing Great Britain at the 2025 European Athletics Team Championships having been the runner-up at the 2025 British Indoor Athletics Championships. Competing in the United States, he won the 2026 NCAA Outdoor Championships. In August of the same year, he won a bronze medal at the 2026 Commonwealth Games and placed fourth at the 2026 European Athletics Championships.

== Early Life ==
Born on Saturday 31st January 2004 at the Portland Hospital (London), Kimani is the third and youngest son of Jules Sankofa (né Jack) and Jennifer Sankofa (née Small). His family hail from Caribbean nations, namely Saint Vincent and the Grenadines, Barbados and Trinidad and Tobago. He spent most of his formative years living in Finchley, north London.

Between 2015-2022, Kimani attended St Albans School, Hertfordshire where he achieved A*A*A at A Level. He studied History at the University of Birmingham where he also competed for the track and field team.

He has been a member of Shaftesbury Barnet Harriers since July 2018.

== Early Career ==
In 2024, Kimani won both the indoor and outdoor high jump titles at British Universities and Colleges Sport (BUCS) championships. He won the outdoor title again in 2025.

In February 2025, he jumped a personal best height of 2.18m whilst competing at the Hustopecské skákání event in the Czech Republic. He was runner-up at the 2025 British Indoor Athletics Championships in Birmingham later that month, with a best jump of 2.15m to finish second behind Otis Poole.

He was selected for the British team to compete at the 2025 European Athletics Team Championships in Madrid in June 2025, jumping a personal best 2.21m on his senior international debut to place seventh, helping the Great Britain team to finish in fifth place overall. He was named in the British team for the 2025 European Athletics U23 Championships in Bergen, Norway, placing eighth in the final. Kimani placed third at the 2025 UK Athletics Championships with a jump of 2.14m on 2 August 2025 in Birmingham, clearing the same height as joint-winners Divine Duruaku and Charlie Husbands but awarded third on countback.

== University of Georgia ==
After graduating from the University of Birmingham with a 2:1 degree in History, Kimani was awarded a full academic and athletic scholarship and transferred to the to the University of Georgia (United States) to study for an MS in Kinesiology (Sport Management and Policy). On 10th January 2026, in his first outing representing UGA, he set a new personal best with a 2.25m clearance at the Clemson Invitational in Clemson, South Carolina. The following month he improved to 2.28m to win the SEC Indoor Championships. On 14 March 2026, he won a bronze medal with a jump of 2.21m at the 2026 NCAA Division I Indoor Track and Field Championships. At the close of the indoor season, Kimani was named an NCAA D1 All-American and in the All-SEC Indoor T&F First Team.

In May 2026, at the start of the outdoor season, he cleared a personal best 2.31m at the Torrin Lawrence Memorial in Athens, Georgia. It was the first time he had breached the 2.30m barrier. The jump broke the University of Georgia school record which had stood since 1985 and meant he held both the indoor and outdoor records for the university. Moreover, it moved him to number 22 on the all-time collegiate list, and to seventh on the British all-time list.. Also in May, he won the 2026 SEC Outdoor Championship to complete conference the set.

On 12 June 2026, Kimani jumped 2.28m to win the 2026 NCAA Outdoor Championships in Eugene, Oregon. The victory meant he bacame only the tenth non-American to win the title in the then 104 editions of the champs and only the second European.

At the close of the indoor season, Kimani was named an NCAA D1 All-American, in the All-SEC Outdoor T&F First Team and Academic All-America Second Team – NCAA Division I Men’s Track & Field/Cross Country.

In November 2026, Kimani was named the University of Georgia's Most Valuable Track and Field Athlete of the year.

== 2026: First Major Individual Champs ==
A week after his NCAA title, Kimani cleared 2.24m to place second behind Joel Clarke-Khan at the 2026 UK Athletics Championships in Birmingham. A few days later, he was invited to his first Diamond League and on 10 July, placed second with a clearance of 2.30m behind Oleh Doroshchuk at the 2026 Herculis event in Monaco.

He was selected to represent England at the 2026 Commonwealth Games in Glasgow, winning the bronze medal with a jump of 2.20m. It was a cold and rain soaked competition and having passed his final attempt at 2.25m he attempted a final jump of 2.28m in an attampt to win the title. Two weeks later, he placed fourth with a clearance of 2.23m at the 2026 European Championships in Birmingham.

Kimani finished the 2026 season ranked 12th in the World Rankings (by points) and 6th in the World Athletics Toplist (by performance). In October 2026, he was moved up to the confirmation level in the 2026-27 Olympic World Class Programme awarded by UK Athletics.

In November, he was nominated for Athletics Weekly's British Male Athlete of the Year award.
