= Tom Hewes =

British high jumper

Personal information
- Born: 15 September 1999 (age 26)

Sport
- Sport: Athletics
- Event: High jump
- Club: Chelmsford Athletics Club

Achievements and titles
- Personal best(s): High jump: 2.18 m (Birmingham, 2024)

Tom Hewes (born 15 September 1999) is a British high jumper. He won the 2024 British Indoor Athletics Championships with a personal best of 2.18 metres.

== Early life ==
From Langham, Essex, he attended Colchester Sixth Form College. He started athletics at Colchester and Tendring Athletics Club. He set a county championship record at the Essex and Eastern Counties Indoor Championships at Lee Valley, winning both titles in the under-17 high jump after clearing 1.93 metres in 2015.

== Career ==
He is a member of Chelmsford Athletics Club. He jumped a personal best of 2.15 metres to win the bronze medal at the English Schools Championships in Birmingham in the U20 event in July 2017, finishing behind Tom Gale and equal in height with silver medallist Joel Khan.

He later made his junior British international debut at the 2017 European Athletics U20 Championships in Grosseto, Italy, in July 2017. At the championships, he cleared 2.00 metres, which was not enough to reach the final.

He set a new personal best of 2.18 metres to win the 2024 British Indoor Athletics Championships in Birmingham. His previous best of 2.15 m had been set in 2017, before a series of injuries hampered his progression and led him to consider retiring from the sport.

In May 2024, he competed for England at the Loughborough International, placing fifth overall.

Defending his national indoor title at the 2025 British Indoor Athletics Championships on 22 February 2025 in Birmingham, he finished eighth with a jump of 2.03 metres.
