= Jack Turner (decathlete) =

British decathlete (born 2001)

Personal information
- Born: 11 July 2001 (age 25)

Sport
- Sport: Athletics
- Events: Decathlon, Heptathlon

Achievements and titles
- Personal bests: Decathlon: 8011 (Denton, 2023); Indoors; Heptathlon: 6000 (Fayeteville, 2024)

Jack Turner (born 11 July 2001) is a British multi-event athlete. He was runner-up in the heptathlon at the 2025 NCAA Indoor Championships.

== Early life ==
From Devon, he attended St Peter’s Prep School, in Lympstone, before later attending Wellington School, Somerset.

== Career ==
A member of Exteer Harriers, he won the U20 decathlon title at the 2019 England Athletics Championships, with a personal best score of 7297 points.

He completed his first senior decathlon in May 2021 representing the University of Texas at San Antonio, and scored a tally of 7659 points, but suffered an injury with three bulging discs in his back. The following year, he placed third overall in the decathlon at the 2022 British Athletics Championships behind Elliot Thompson.

In May 2023, Turner exceeded the 8000-point barrier for the first time with a score of 8011 points whilst competing in Texas, becoming the seventh British man to exceed 8000 points. That summer, he competed for Great Britain at the 2023 European Athletics U23 Championships in Espoo, Finland and placed fifth after the first day but was unable to complete the competition after suffering an injury.

Competing for the University of Arkansas, he scored 6000 points in his first indoor heptathlon of 2024 to win the Razorback Invitational, and become only the second British athlete to achieve that score. He won the men's decathlon title with 7,935 points at the 2024 Southeastern Conference Championships at in Gainesville, Florida. The points tally moved him to fourth on the all-time Arkansas Razorbacks list. He finished fourth in the decathlon at the 2024 NCAA Outdoor Championships in Eugene, Oregon with 7963 points.

He was runner-up to Peyton Bair in the indoor heptathlon at the 2025 NCAA Indoor Championships with 5962 points. He placed seventh in the decathlon at the 2025 NCAA Outdoor Championships in Eugene, Oregon. In July 2025, he competed in the decathlon at the England Athletics Championships in Birmingham.

== Personal life ==
He studied for a Master's degree in operations management at the University of Arkansas.
