= Adrianna Topolnicka =

Polish middle-distance runner (born 1999)

Personal information
- Native name: Polish: Adrianny Czapli
- Full name: Adrianna Daria Czapla; Adrianna Daria Topolnicka
- Nationality: Poland
- Born: Adrianna Czapla (1999-2022); 4 July 1999 (age 27)
- Home town: Silesia, Poland
- Height: 169 cm (5 ft 7 in)
- Weight: 53 kg (117 lb)

Sport
- Sport: Athletics
- Events: 800 metres 600 metres
- Club: AZS AWF Katowice

Achievements and titles
- National finals: 2015 Polish U18s; • 800m, 2nd (silver); 2016 Polish Indoor U18s; • 600m, 1st (gold); 2016 Polish U18s; • 800m, 1st (gold); 2017 Polish Indoor U20s; • 800m, 1st (gold); 2017 Polish Indoors; • 800m, 5th; 2017 Polish U20s; • 800m, 2nd (silver); 2019 Polish Champs; • 800m, 8th; 2021 Polish Champs; • 800m, DNF; 2022 Polish Champs; • 800m, 3rd (bronze)
- Personal bests
Medal record
Women's athletics
Representing Poland
European Youth Olympic Festival
Bronze medal – third place	2015 Tbilisi	800 m
- Updated on 15 January 2024

Adrianna Daria Topolnicka (née Czapla; born 4 July 1999) is a Polish middle-distance runner specialising in the 800 metres. Though her career has been marked by injuries, she achieved her personal best of 1:59.86 at the 2022 Kamila Skolimowska Memorial and was a bronze medalist at the 2022 Polish Athletics Championships.

== Biography ==
Topolnicks is from Silesia, and she trains with the AZS AWF Katowice athletics club in Katowice.

Topolnicka's first international competition was at the 2015 European Youth Olympic Festival, where she won the bronze medal in the 800 m behind winner Malin Edland.

The following year at the World U20 Championships, Topolnicka qualified for the semifinals with a 2:08 clocking, third in her heat in a good position to make the finals. However, she finished last among the semifinalists running 2:11.44 and failed to make the finals. It was noted by the Polish Athletic Association that Topolnicka was younger than most of her competitors, and that she had just recently competed at the 2016 European Athletics Youth Championships where she finished 5th.

Topolnicka returned to continental competition at the 2021 European U23 Championships. She qualified for the finals on time by finishing 3rd in her heat with a 2:04.30 mark. At the finals, Topolnicka started the race but did not finish due to injury, placing 8th by default.

At the 2022 European Championships, Topolnicka advanced past the first round but again had a poor showing in the semifinals, running 2:04.15 and failing to qualify for the finals.

== Statistics ==
=== Best performances ===
Event	Mark	Place	Competition	Venue	Date	Ref
800 metres	1:59.86	7th	Kamila Skolimowska Memorial	Chorzów, Poland	6 August 2022	
600 metres	1:26.84	1st place, gold medalist(s)	Internationales Thallos Läufermeeting	Pliezhausen, Germany	14 May 2023	
