= Hannah Hopper =

British race walker (born 2000)

Personal information
- Nationality: British
- Born: 24 April 2003 (age 23)

Sport
- Sport: Athletics
- Event: Racewalking
- Club: Cambridge Harriers

Hannah Hopper (born 24 April 2003) is a British racewalking athlete. She has won the British national championships titles, both indoors and outdoors.

== Biography ==
Hopper is a member of the Cambridge Harriers, was runner-up at the England Athletics Championships in July 2023 in Chelmsford over 5000 metres behind Abigail Jennings.

She won the 2025 British Indoor Athletics Championships in Birmingham in February 2025, over 3000 metres. She won the England Athletics Championships title in July 2025 over 3000 metres. Hopper became the British 5000 metres walk champion after she won the title at the 2025 UK Athletics Championships title in Birmingham on 3 August 2025 in a personal best 24:24.42 to win by 23 seconds ahead of Bethan Davies and Abigail Jennings.
