= Adelaide Omitowoju =

British athlete

- Omitowoju at the Meeting Indoor de Limoges 2026

Personal information
- Nationality: British
- Born: 22 October 1999 (age 27)

Sport
- Club: Harrow AC

Achievements and titles
- Personal bests: Triple jump: 13.62m (Birmingham, 2025)

Adelaide Omitowoju (born 22 October 1999) is a British triple jumper.

== Biography ==
Omitowoju won the triple jump gold medal competing for Cambridgeshire, at the 2017 English Schools' AA Track & Field Championships, with a personal best of 12.30m.

She won triple jump titles at the British Universities and Colleges Sport (BUCS) championships both indoors and outdoors in 2023 competing for the University of Sheffield.

In July 2023, she placed third in the triple jump at the 2023 British Athletics Championships with a personal best of 13.10 metres to finish behind Temi Ojora and event winner Georgina Forde-Wells in July 2023 in Manchester.

She was runner-up to Lily Hulland at the 2024 British Indoor Athletics Championships with a jump of 12.94 metres and placed fourth in the 2024 British Athletics Championships behind Hulland, Ojora and Naomi Metzger with a jump of 13.12 metres

Omitowoju was runner-up to Forde-Wells in the triple jump at the 2025 British Indoor Athletics Championships in Birmingham with a jump of 13.29 metres and won the England Athletics title with 13.29 metres in July 2025, before winning her first senior national title in the triple jump at the 2025 UK Athletics Championships in Birmingham on 2 August 2025, with a personal best 13.62 metres.
