= Charlie Husbands =

British high jumper (born 2002)

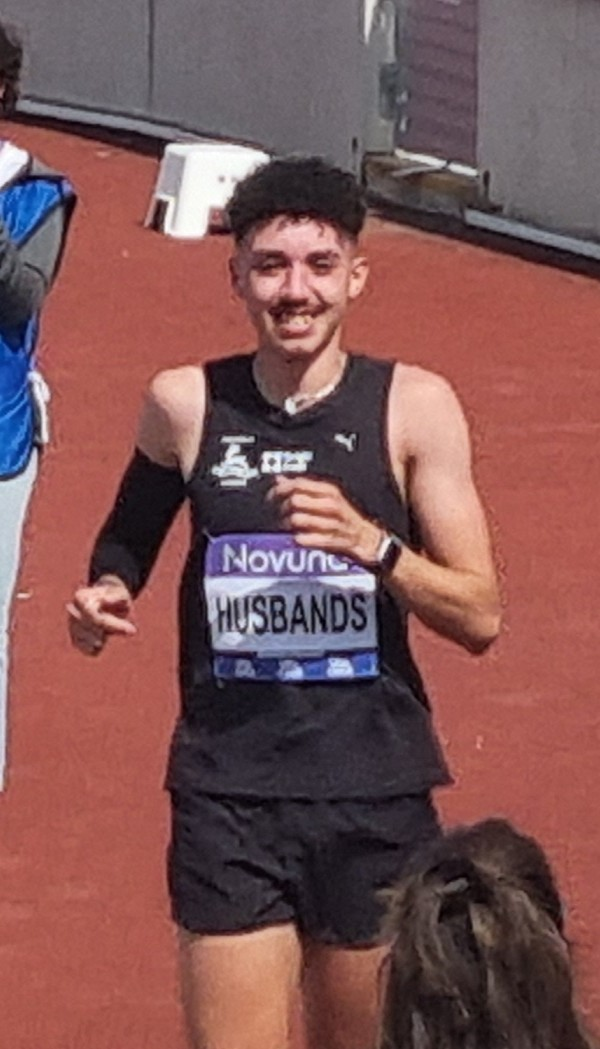
- 2025 UK Athletics Championships

Personal information
- Nationality: British
- Born: 2 May 2002 (age 24)

Sport
- Sport: Athletics
- Event: High jump
- Club: Bromsgrove and Redditch AC

Achievements and titles
- Personal bests: High jump: 2:21m (Loughborough, 2026)
Medal record
UK Athletics Championships
Gold medal – first place	2025 Birmingham	high jump

Charlie Husbands (born 2 May 2002) is a British high jumper. He was joint-winner of the 2025 UK Athletics Championships.

== Biography ==
Husbands is a member of Bromsgrove and Redditch AC. He won the silver medal in the high jump at the Scottish Athletics National Indoor Championships in Glasgow in January 2022, setting a personal best of 1.99 metres.

In February 2025, he placed third at the British Indoor Athletics Championships in Birmingham, with a best jump of 2.11 metres to finish behind Otis Poole and Kimani Jack.

In 2025, Husbands became the British high jump champion, after being joint-winner of the 2025 UK Athletics Championships in Birmingham on 2 August 2025, alongside Divine Duruaku, with both athletes clearing 2.14 metres and agreeing to share the title.

Husbands jumped a personal best 2.21 metres in Loughborough in January 2026. He equalled his personal best with 2.21 metres in Hustopeče in February 2026. Competing at the 2026 British Indoor Athletics Championships in Birmingham that month, he placed fourth overall with a jump of 2.15 metres. In May, he won the high jump in the National Athletics League opener in Derby, with a jump of 2.21 metres, ahead of Duruaku and Joel Clarke-Khan. On 20 June, Husbands jumped 2.21 metres to place third behind Clarke-Khan and Kimani Jack at the 2026 British Championships in Birmingham. On 5 July, Husbands won the England Athletics Championships on count back with 2.14 metres.
