= 2021 European Athletics U23 Championships – Women's 800 metres =

Women's 800 metres at the 2021 European Athletics U23 Championships
- Venue: Kadriorg Stadium, Tallinn
- Dates: 8, 10 July
- Competitors: 27 from 21 nations
- Winning time: 2:01.80

Medalists
gold medal	Isabelle Boffey	Great Britain
silver medal	Eloisa Coiro	Italy
bronze medal	Wilma Nielsen	Sweden

The women's 800 metres event at the 2021 European Athletics U23 Championships was held in Tallinn, Estonia, at Kadriorg Stadium on 8 and 10 July.

== Records ==
Prior to the competition, the records were as follows:

European U23 record	Ekaterina Zavyalova (RUS)	1:58.15	Cheboksary, Russia	4 July 2012
Championship U23 record	Elena Kofanova (RUS)	1:58.94	Kaunas, Lithuania	18 July 2009

== Results ==
=== Round 1 ===
Qualification rule: First 2 in each heat (Q) and the next 2 fastest (q) advance to the Final.

Rank	Heat	Name	Nationality	Time	Notes
1	3	Delia Sclabas	Switzerland	2:03.83	Q
2	3	Khahisa Mhlanga	Great Britain	2:04.04	Q, PB
3	2	Isabelle Boffey	Great Britain	2:04.05	Q
4	1	Eloisa Coiro	Italy	2:04.06	Q
5	2	Wilma Nielsen	Sweden	2:04.12	Q, PB
6	1	Daniela García	Spain	2:04.25	Q
7	3	Adrianna Czapla	Poland	2:04.30	q
8	3	Gaël De Coninck	Sweden	2:04.31	q
9	2	Gabriela Gajanová	Slovakia	2:04.50	
10	2	Majtie Kolberg	Germany	2:04.52	
11	1	Viola Westling	Finland	2:04.81	PB
12	1	Bregje Sloot	Netherlands	2:05.07	
13	3	Laura Pellicoro	Italy	2:05.70	
14	2	Gabija Galvydytė	Lithuania	2:05.81	PB
15	2	Hédi Heffner	Hungary	2:06.19	PB
16	2	Adéla Sádlová	Czech Republic	2:06.39	
17	1	Tuğba Toptaş	Turkey	2:06.40	PB
18	1	Daria Vdovychenko	Ukraine	2:07.08	SB
19	1	Mia Helene Mørck	Denmark	2:07.60	
20	3	Edita Sklenská	Czech Republic	2:07.62	
21	3	Solveig Vråle	Norway	2:08.30	
22	2	Palina Kiberava	Belarus	2:08.49	PB
23	3	Sivan Auerbach	Israel	2:08.69	
24	1	Julia Nielsen	Sweden	2:10.71	
25	3	Angela Veronica Olenici	Romania	2:14.16	
26	2	Silan Ayyıldız	Turkey	2:16.86	
	1	Albina Deliu	Kosovo	DNF	

=== Final ===
Rank	Name	Nationality	Time	Notes
1st place, gold medalist(s)	Isabelle Boffey	Great Britain	2:01.80	
2nd place, silver medalist(s)	Eloisa Coiro	Italy	2:02.07	PB
3rd place, bronze medalist(s)	Wilma Nielsen	Sweden	2:02.29	PB
4	Khahisa Mhlanga	Great Britain	2:04.05	
5	Daniela García	Spain	2:04.13	PB
6	Delia Sclabas	Switzerland	2:04.35	
7	Gaël De Coninck	Sweden	2:05.39	
	Adrianna Czapla	Poland	DNF	
