= Jude Bright-Davies =

British triple jumper (born 1999)

Personal information
- Born: 27 March 1999 (age 27)
- Education: Lincoln College, Oxford (MMath)

Sport
- Sport: Athletics
- Event: Triple jump
- Club: Thames Valley Harriers, Achilles Club
- Coached by: David Johnson (triple jumper)

Achievements and titles
- Personal bests: Triple jump: 16.28m (Loughborough, 2023)

Jude Bright-Davies (born 27 March 1999) is a British triple jumper. He was British Indoor champion in 2023 and represented Great Britain at the 2023 European Athletics Team Championships.

== Biography ==
From Harrow, London, Bright-Davies attended Claremont High School, Kenton, and won triple jump gold at the 2015 School Games with a jump of 14.27 metres and set a personal best that year with a 14.62m jump at the England Athletics Championships.

A member of Thames Valley Harriers, Bright-Davies set a new personal best of 16.18 metres in Loughborough in May 2022. He was runner-up at the 2022 British Athletics Championships. He became British indoor champion at the 2023 British Indoor Athletics Championships in 2023. That year, he placed fifth competing for Great Britain at the 2023 European Athletics Team Championships First Division in Poland. Having improved his personal best to 16.23 metres, he jumped a wind-assisted 16.50 metres to win the 2023 England Championships. He placed second in the triple jump at the 2023 British Athletics Championships but finished the year ranked number one in the UK for the event.

In August 2025, he won a share of the silver medal behind Archie Yeo at the 2025 UK Athletics Championships. In 2026, he placed second behind Tito Odunaike at the 2026 British Indoor Athletics Championships in Birmingham on 14 February. He placed placed second behind Daniel Falode at the 2026 UK Athletics Championships in Birmingham on 21 June. Having been leading the competition with 15.72 metres, he was pushed into second place as Falode won the title with his final round jump.
