= Lily Hulland =

British athlete

Personal information
- Nationality: British
- Born: Lily Rosa Hulland; 1 September 2001 (age 25)

Sport
- Sport: Athletics
- Events: Triple jump, long jump

Achievements and titles
- Personal bests: Long jump: 5.86m (Loughborough, 2024); Triple jump: 13.25m (Manchester, 2024)

Lily Hulland (born 1 September 2001) is a British track and field athlete. In February 2024, she became the British national champion in the triple jump indoors.

== Early life and education ==
Born in Marbella, Spain to British parents from Manchester, Hulland grew up in Ronda. By 2019 she held the under-18 and under-20 record for Andalucía. She has a younger sister called Jasmine who also competes in athletics.

Hulland studied graphic design at Loughborough University. After graduating in 2024 she began a sports scholarship at the University of Virginia in the United States.

== Career ==
Hulland was British Universities and College (BUCS) indoors triple jump champion in 2020, and again in 2022.

In June 2022 she finished third in the triple jump at the 2022 British Athletics Championships in Manchester. In February 2023, Hulland was runner-up at the 2023 British Indoor Athletics Championships in the triple jump.

In June 2023, she won the triple jump at the England Athletics U23 championship in Chelmsford, recording a personal best 13.24m with her first jump and a wind-assisted 13.39m.

On 18 February 2024, Hulland won gold at the 2024 British Indoor Athletics Championships in Birmingham with a new indoors personal best distance of 13.06m. In May 2024, she was selected to represent England at the Loughborough International. In June 2024, Hulland placed third in the triple jump at the 2024 British Athletics Championships in Manchester with a personal best wind-legal jump of 13.25 metres (+0.8).

On 8 February 2026, Hulland won the triple jump at the Welsh Indoor Championships in Cardiff with a jump of 12.85 metres. The following week at the 2026 British Indoor Athletics Championships in Birmingham, Hulland placed fourth overall with 12.63 metres. On 20 June, she placed fifth in the triple jump at the 2026 UK Championships.

== Personal life ==
In 2024, she wrote a children's book about British and European champion jumper Jazmin Sawyers. She said she hoped it would help provide relatable role models for other young women progressing in sport. The book later formed part of a Team Record Breakers series including picture books about Keely Hodgkinson, Katarina Johnson-Thompson and Molly Caudery.
