= Wilma Nielsen =

Swedish athlete

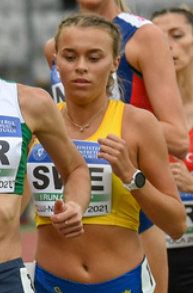

Personal information
- Born: 2 June 2001 (age 25) Gothenburg, Sweden

Sport
- Sport: Track and field
- Events: 800 metres, 1500 metres
- College team: Bradley Braves, Oregon Ducks
Medal record
Women's athletics
Representing Sweden
European U23 Championships
Bronze medal – third place	2021 Tallinn	800 m

Wilma Nielsen (born 2 June 2001) is a Swedish middle-distance runner. She won a bronze medal at the 2021 European Athletics U23 Championships in the 800 metres and currently runs collegiately for the Oregon Ducks. She previously ran for Bradley University and the University of Washington.

== Career ==
Nielsen has won three national outdoor titles in the 800 meters, at the 2022, 2024 and 2025 Swedish Championships respectively. She also won a national indoor title in the same event in 2023.

She competed for Sweden at the 2024 European Athletics Championships in Rome in June 2024, qualifying for the semi-finals of the women's 800 metres.

In March 2025, she competed in the 800 metres at the 2025 European Athletics Indoor Championships in Apeldoorn. Later that month, she held off the fast finishing British runner Mena Scatchard to win the mile run at the 2025 NCAA Indoor Championships in Virginia Beach on 15 March, as the Oregon Ducks won the women's team title. She was selected to compete for Sweden at the 2025 World Athletics Indoor Championships in Nanjing, where she competed in her sixth race in fifteen days on three different continents on 21 March 2025.

In September 2025, she competed over 1500 metres at the 2025 World Championships in Tokyo, Japan, without advancing to the semi-finals.

On 1 February 2026, Nielsen finished 8th in the Wanamaker Mile at the 2026 Millrose Games in New York, with her time of 4:23.56 setting a national record.

== NCAA ==
Wilma Nielsen is an NCAA Champion, 5-time All-American, 3-time Missouri Valley Conference Champion, 8-time MVC honoree, & 2-time Big Ten Conference Champion.

representing Oregon Ducks
2025	2025 NCAA Division I Indoor Track and Field Championships	Mile	4:32.40	(gold) 1st
2025	2025 NCAA Division I Indoor Track and Field Championships	Distance Medley Relay	10:45.99	(silver) 2nd
2025	Big Ten Conference Indoor Track and Field Championships	Mile	4:38.77	(gold) 1st
2025	Big Ten Conference Indoor Track and Field Championships	Distance Medley Relay	10:56.97	(gold) 1st
2024	2024 NCAA Division I Cross Country Championships	6 km	20:43.0	127th
2024	Big Ten Conference Cross Country Championships	6 km	19:50.8	21st
representing Washington Huskies
2024	2024 NCAA Division I Outdoor Track and Field Championships	800 m	DNS	24th
2024	Pac-12 Conference Outdoor Track and Field Championships	800 m	2:03.53	4th
2024	2024 NCAA Division I Indoor Track and Field Championships	800 m	2:02.33	6th
representing Bradley Braves
2023	Missouri Valley Conference Cross Country Championships	6 km	21:00.5	6th
2023	2023 NCAA Division I Indoor Track and Field Championships	800 m	2:03.34	6th
2023	Missouri Valley Conference Indoor Track and Field Championships	800 m	2:09.66	(gold) 1st
2022	2022 NCAA Division I Outdoor Track and Field Championships	800 m	2:06.08	35th
2022	Missouri Valley Conference Outdoor Track and Field Championships	800 m	2:06.82	5th
2022	Missouri Valley Conference Outdoor Track and Field Championships	1500 m	4:23.60	(gold) 1st
2022	2022 NCAA Division I Indoor Track and Field Championships	800 m	2:03.34	6th
2022	Missouri Valley Conference Indoor Track and Field Championships	800 m	2:09.66	(gold) 1st
2021	Missouri Valley Conference Cross Country Championships	6 km	21:41.3	12th
2021	2021 NCAA Division I Outdoor Track and Field Championships	800 m	2:07.78	22nd
2021	Missouri Valley Conference Outdoor Track and Field Championships	800 m	2:07.51	(bronze) 3rd
2021	Missouri Valley Conference Outdoor Track and Field Championships	4 × 400 m relay	3:46.17	4th
2021	2020 Missouri Valley Conference Cross Country Championships	4.88 km	18:08.6	10th
2021	Missouri Valley Conference Indoor Track and Field Championships	800 m	2:09.32	(silver) 2nd
2021	Missouri Valley Conference Indoor Track and Field Championships	Mile	4:47.41	(silver) 2nd

== Personal bests ==
- 800 metres – 2:00.86 (Rome 2024)
- 1500 metres – 4:02.05 (Budapest 2025)
- Mile – 4:25.89i (New York 2025)
