= Revée Walcott-Nolan =

British middle-distance runner (born 1995)

Personal information
- Nationality: British
- Born: 6 March 1995 (age 31) Luton, Bedfordshire, England

Sport
- Sport: Track and Field
- Event: 1500m

Achievements and titles
- Personal bests: 800m: 1:59.05 (Tooting, 2025); 1500m: 3:58.08 (Paris, 2024)
Medal record
Women's athletics
Representing Great Britain
European Indoor Championships
Bronze medal – third place	2025 Apeldoorn	1500 m

Revée Walcott-Nolan (born 6 March 1995) is a British athlete, known for being the 1500m British Champion in 2021, and competing for Britain in the 2020 Tokyo Olympics and the 2024 Paris Olympics.

== Early and personal life ==
From Luton, Walcott-Nolan is of Jamaican, English and Irish descent. She was an attendee at Bedford Girls' School until 2013, she has said she was inspired by her grandmother into athletics. She has run for Woodford Green Essex Ladies as well as the Newham & Essex Beagles and has been at Luton AC since a teenager. She graduated from St Mary’s University, Twickenham with a degree in sports science in 2016.

== Career ==
Walcott-Nolan won the 3000m in the European Athletics Team Championships (Poland) in March 2021. Walcott-Nolan won the 1500 metres race at the 2021 British Championships, and in July 2021 was officially named in the British squad for the delayed 2020 Summer Games in Tokyo. In the heats of the 1500 m she came 7th, and missed out on a fastest loser place for the semi-finals by 0.01 of a second.

In January 2024, she set a new indoor personal best over 1500 metres, running 4:03.93 in Dortmund. On 18 February 2024, she was runner-up at the 2024 British Indoor Athletics Championships in Birmingham, over 1500 metres. She was selected for the 2024 World Athletics Indoor Championships in Glasgow where she qualified for the final of the women's 1500 metres race. She finished sixth in the final in a time of 4:04.60.

In May 2024, she finished seventh in the 1500 metres at the Doha Diamond League in 4:03.99. Later that month she ran 4:02.42 in Ostrava. On 2 June, she ran 4:00.77 at the 2024 BAUHAUS-galan Diamond League event in Stockholm. She lowered her personal best to 4:00.43 in Bydgoszcz on 20 June 2024. That month, she finished third in the 1500 metres at the 2024 British Athletics Championships in Manchester.

=== Paris 2024 Summer Olympic Games ===
Revée Walcott-Nolan was selected to represent Great Britain in the 1,500 metres at the 2024 Summer Olympics between August 6 and August 8, 2024. On August 6, she finished in eighth in her heat with a time of 4:06.44. A day after, she finished second in her repechage round heat with a time of 4:06.73 minutes and qualified to the semi finals. On August 8 in the semifinals she finished ninth in 3:58:08, a personal best.

On 31 December 2024, she pipped compatriot Poppy Tank to win the Battersea New Years Eve 5k in London.

=== 2025 ===
She finished runner-up over 1500 metres at the 2025 British Indoor Athletics Championships. She was selected for the British team for the 2025 European Athletics Indoor Championships in Apeldoorn, winning the bronze medal in the 1500 metres. She was named in the British team for the 2025 World Athletics Indoor Championships in March 2025.

She placed third in the 1500 metres at the European Team Championships First Division in Madrid on 29 June 2025. On 3 August, she placed third in the final of the 1500 metres at the 2025 UK Athletics Championships in Birmingham. That month, she ran a personal best of 1:59.05 for the 800 metres in Tooting.

In September 2025, she was a semi-finalist over 1500 metres at the 2025 World Championships in Tokyo, Japan.

=== 2026 ===
Walcott-Nolan placed third in the 1500 metres at the British Indoor Championships in Birmingham on 15 February 2026 behind Jemma Reekie and Molly Hudson. On 19 February, in Liévin, France, Walcott-Nolan ran a British record of 5:35.87 for the 2000 metres, breaking Yvonne Murray's time of 5:40.86 from 1993. On 1 March in Glasgow, she ran an indoor 1500 m personal best of 4:01.50, the fourth-fastest ever by a Briton. In May, she ran 4:00.78 for the 1500 m at the 2026 Xiamen Diamond League. In June, she reached the final of the 1500 metres at the 2026 UK Championships. She competed in the mile at the 2026 Commonwealth Games in Glasgow, Scotland.
