= 2024 British Indoor Athletics Championships =

Indoor track and field competition for British athletes

- Dates: 17-18 February
- Host city: Birmingham, United Kingdom
- Venue: Arena Birmingham
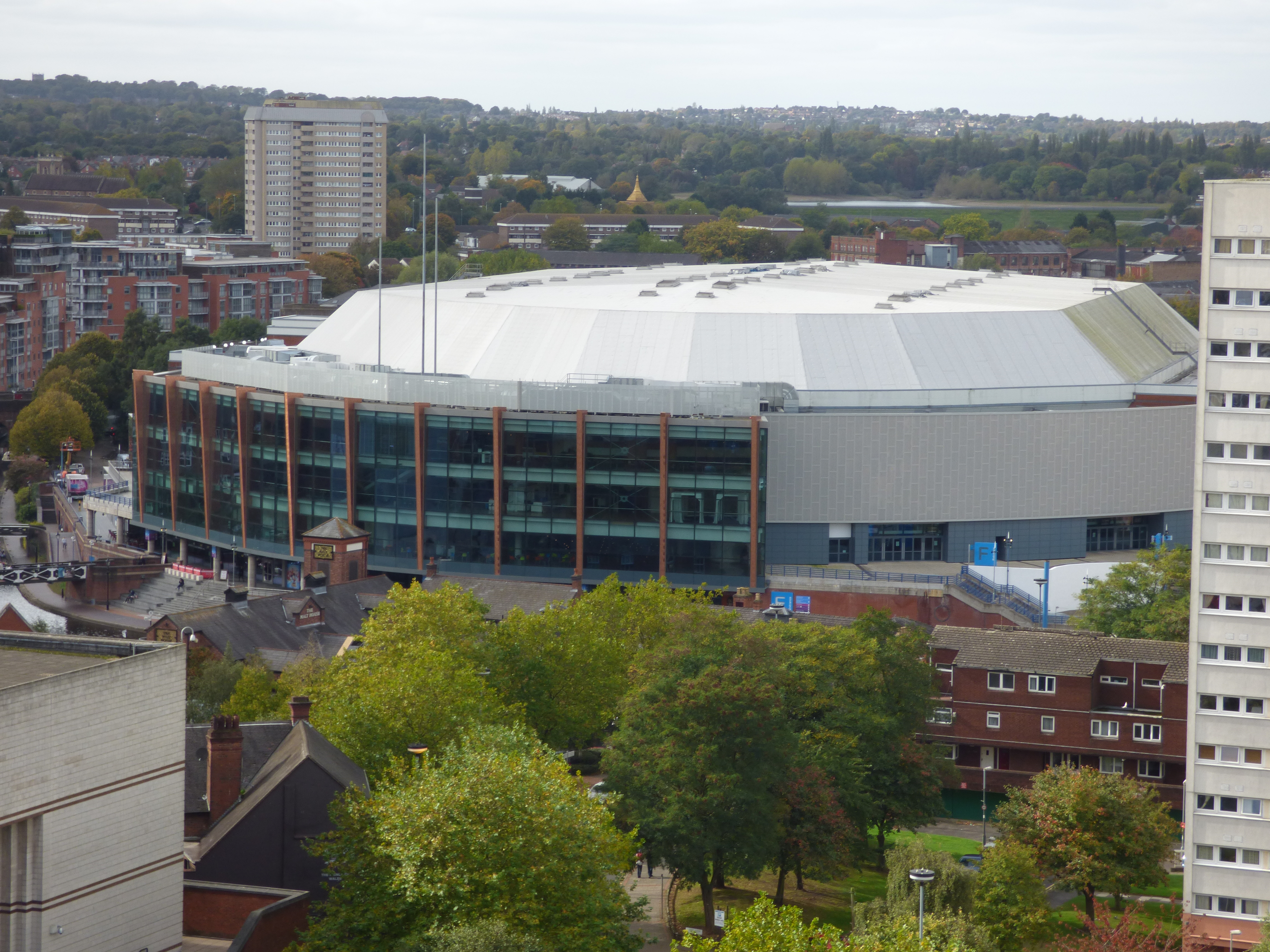
- Level: Senior
- Type: Indoor

The 2024 British Indoor Athletics Championships were the national indoor track and field competition for British athletes, held on 17 and 18 February 2024 at Arena Birmingham. The competition served as a qualification event for the 2024 World Athletics Indoor Championships, to be held in Glasgow, Scotland.

== Background ==
The 2024 British Indoor Athletics Championships were held on 17 and 18 February 2024 at Arena Birmingham. In the United Kingdom, they were shown online by the BBC. The championships were used as a qualification event for the 2024 World Athletics Indoor Championships.

== Results ==
=== Men ===
Event	Gold		Silver		Bronze	
60 metres	Jeremiah Azu	6.60	Andrew Robertson	6.68	Ojie Edoburun	6.71
200 metres	Richard Akinyebo	21.28	Sagesse Nguie	21.38	Harry Taylor	21.47
400 metres	Lee Thompson	46.69	Ben Higgins	46.79	Isaac Osei-Tutu	48.21
800 metres	Jack Higgins	1:47.91	Guy Learmonth	1:47.91	Justin Davies	1:49.44
1500 metres	Piers Copeland	3:48.43	Callum Elson	3:48.54	Adam Fogg	3:48.63
3000 metres	James West	7:51.09	Charles Wheeler	7:52.19	Zak Seddon	7:53.52
3000 metres race walk	Chris Snook	11:45.68	Tom Partington	13:04.21	Luc Legon	13:05.05
60 metres hurdles	Tade Ojora	7.62	David King	7.65	Daniel Goriola	7.87
High jump	Tom Hewes	2.18	William Grimsey	2.18	Akin Coward	2.12
Pole vault	Owen Heard	5.26	Lazarus Benjamin	5.16	Thomas Walley	5.16
Long jump	Alexander Farquharson	7.46	Samuel Khogali	7.41	Sam Danson	7.40
Triple jump	Archie Yeo	15.55	Seun Okome	15.36	Daniel AkinRadewo	15.19
Shot put	Scott Lincoln	20.08	Patrick Swan	18.33	Andrew Knight	17.28
Para 60 Metres	Kevin Santos (T47)	7.00	Zac Shaw (T12)	7.04	Zak Skinner (T13)	7.22

=== Women ===
Event	Gold		Silver		Bronze	
60 metres	Amy Hunt	7.26	Bianca Williams	7.30	Mabel Akande	7.32
200 metres	Ama Pipi	23.29 SB	Success Eduan	23.41 PB	Brooke Ironside	23.68
400 metres	Laviai Nielsen	51.54	Lina Nielsen	51.95 PB	Jessie Knight	52.79
800 metres	Jemma Reekie	1:58.24 CR	Isabelle Boffey	2:00.27 SB	Erin Wallace	2:01.35 PB
1500 metres	Georgia Bell	4:09.66	Revée Walcott-Nolan	4:10.48	Sarah McDonald	4:12.92
3000 metres	Laura Muir	8:58.80	Hannah Nuttall	9:01.94	Kate Axford	9:08.03 PB
3000 metres race walk	Abigail Jennings	14:09.22 PB	Gracie Griffiths	14:12.62 PB	Abby Hughes	14:19.09 PB
60 metres hurdles	Cindy Sember	7.98	Abigail Pawlett	8.24	Jessica Hunter	8.27
High jump	Morgan Lake	1.85 m	Kate Anson	1.82 m	Lucy Walliker	1.78 m
Pole vault	Molly Caudery	4.85 m WL CR	Jade Ive	4.31 m	Jade Spencer-Smith	4.31 m
Long jump	Jade O'Dowda	6.19 m PB	Cleo Martin-Evans	6.18 m PB	Molly Palmer	6.18 m PB
Triple jump	Lily Hulland	13.06 m PB	Adelaide Omitowoju	12.94 m PB	Amy Warre	12.88 m PB
Shot put	Amelia Campbell	17.74 m	Serena Vincent	16.69 m	Sophie McKinna	16.55 m
Para 60 Metres	Olivia Breen (T38)	8.22	Maddie Down (T38)	8.24	Rebecca Scott (T47)	8.49
