= Tom Gale (high jumper) =

English high jumper (born 1998)

Personal information
- Nationality: British (English)
- Born: 18 December 1998 (age 27) Bath, England
- Height: 1.93 m (6 ft 4 in)
- Weight: 78 kg (172 lb)

Sport
- Sport: Athletics
- Event: High jump
- Club: Team Bath
- Coached by: Denis Doyle (2015–); Diana Viles (–2015)

Tom Gale (born 18 December 1998) is an English athlete specialising in the high jump. He won the bronze medal at the 2017 European U20 Championships. In 2018 he competed at the 2018 Commonwealth Games without qualifying for the final. In 2019 he won the silver medal at the 2019 European U23 Championships. He holds the title of the youngest Briton to clear 2.30m in the high jump, achieving this at 18 years old.

== Biography ==
Born in Bath, Somerset, Gale grew-up in Trowbridge, Wiltshire, where he attended John of Gaunt School.

Gale won the English Schools Championships, in Birmingham, in the U20 events in July 2017, with a jump of 2.22 metres to finish ahead of silver medalist Joel Khan and bronze medalist Tom Hewes who both cleared 2.15 metres. Later that month, he won the bronze medal representing Great Britain at the European U20 Championships in Grosseto, Italy, with a best jump of 2.28 metres.

In 2018, he represented England at the 2018 Commonwealth Games in Gold Coast, Australia, without qualifying for the final. In July 2019, he won the silver medal at the 2019 European U23 Championships in Gävle, Sweden, with a best jump of 2.27 metres.

He set a personal best of 2.33 metres whilst competing indoors in Hustopeče, Czech Republic in February 2020. Later that month, he jumped 2.30 metres to win the 2020 British Indoor Athletics Championships in Glasgow.

In June 2021, he won the British Athletics Championships in Manchester with a jump of 2.23 metres. At the delayed 2020 Olympic Games, held in Tokyo, Japan, in 2021, he was one of thirteen who qualified for the final by jumping 2.28 metres, his season's best. He placed 11th overall after three attempts at 2.30. Whilst competing in the final, Gale was in considerable pain due to a pre-existing injury that he had carried with him into the Olympics; it proved to be his last competition for 766 days, as he suffered further injury during his rehabilitation.

He moved from Bath to Loughborough in May 2023 to train alongside fellow British high jumpers Joel Clarke-Khan and Morgan Lake. He returned to competition at the Palio Citta' della Quercia in Rovereto, Italy in May 2023, winning the competition.

== International competitions ==
Year	Competition	Venue	Position	Notes
Representing Great Britain and England
2016	World U20 Championships	Bydgoszcz, Poland	9th	2.18 m
2017	European U20 Championships	Grosseto, Italy	3rd	2.28 m
2018	Commonwealth Games	Gold Coast, Australia	14th (q)	2.18 m
2019	European U23 Championships	Gävle, Sweden	2nd	2.27 m
2021	Olympic Games	Tokyo	11th	2.27 m
