= Molly Hudson =

British middle-distance runner

Personal information
- Born: 16 August 2002 (age 24)

Sport
- Sport: Athletics
- Event: Middle-distance running

Achievements and titles
- Personal bests: 800m: 2:02.84 (2026); 1500m: 4:04.28 (2026); Mile: 4:30.92 (2024); 3000m: 9:17.55 (2024)

Molly Hudson (born 16 August 2002) is a British middle-distance runner. She was runner-up over 1500 metres at the 2026 British Indoor Athletics Championships.

== Biography ==
From Derbyshire and coached in the early part of her career by Helen Clitheroe, Hudson represented England at the 2023 Reykjavik International Games where she won the women’s 800 metres with a personal best time of 2:07:10. Hudson spent two years studying in the United States at Boston College before returning to the United Kingdom and training in Loughborough with Ben Pattison.

Hudson won the England Athletics title over 800 metres in July 2025. Hudson won the Ayo Falola Dream Mile at Lee Valley on 4 February 2026 in a track record time of 4:32.36.

Having ran an outright personal 1500 metres personal best competing indoors in 2026, Hudson ran 4:27.21 to place second overall at the 2026 British Indoor Athletics Championships over 1500 metres, finishing runner-up to Jemma Reekie on 15 February 2026, and finishing ahead of Revee Walcott-Nolan.

In May 2026, Hudson finished third with a personal best 4:07.27 for the 1500 metres at The Belfast Classic, and third over 1500 metres at the British Milers' Club Trafford Grand Prix in Manchester, before equalling her personal best late that month in Brussels. In June, she reached the final of the 1500 metres at the 2026 UK Championships, placing sixth overall.
