= Chukwuemeka Osammor =

British athlete (born 2001)

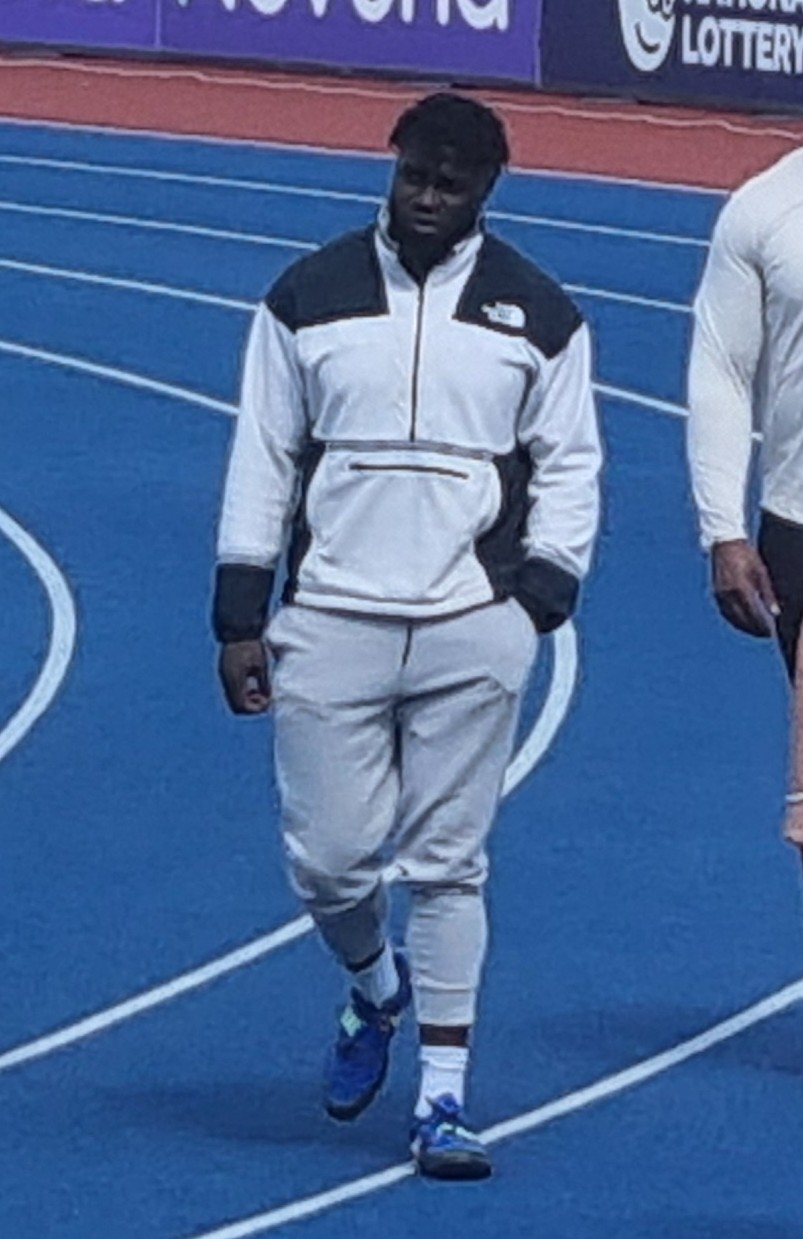
- 2025 UK Athletics Championships

Personal information
- Nationality: British (English)
- Born: 15 June 2001 (age 25)

Sport
- Sport: Athletics
- Event(s): Discus, Shot put
- Club: Sheffield & Dearne Athletic Club

Achievements and titles
- Personal best(s): Discus: 60.81m (Manchester, 2022); Shot put 16.71m (Sheffield, 2023)
Medal record
Men's athletics
Representing Great Britain
British Athletics Championships
Gold medal – first place	2024 Manchester	Discus

Chukwuemeka Osammor (born 15 June 2001) is a British discus thrower and shot putter. In 2024, he became British national champion in the discus.

== Biography ==
From Sheffield, he attended De Montfort University.

In June 2022, as a member of Sheffield & Dearne Athletic Club, he threw a personal best distance in the discus of 60.81 metres.

In February 2023, he won the discus at the UK Winter Long Throws Championships, in Loughborough. In March 2023, he captained the England team and won the U23 discus at the Indoor Throwing competition at Växjö, Sweden.

In May 2023, he won the gold medal in the discus throw with a distance of 54.09 metres at the British Universities and Colleges (BUCS) Championships in Manchester. In July 2023, he competed for Great Britain at the 2023 European Athletics U23 Championships in Espoo, Finland.

In June 2024, he became British national champion in the discus at the 2024 British Athletics Championships in Manchester.

He finished in third place in the shot put at the 2025 British Indoor Athletics Championships in Birmingham, on 23 February 2025.
