= Daniel Falode =

British triple jumper (born 2002)

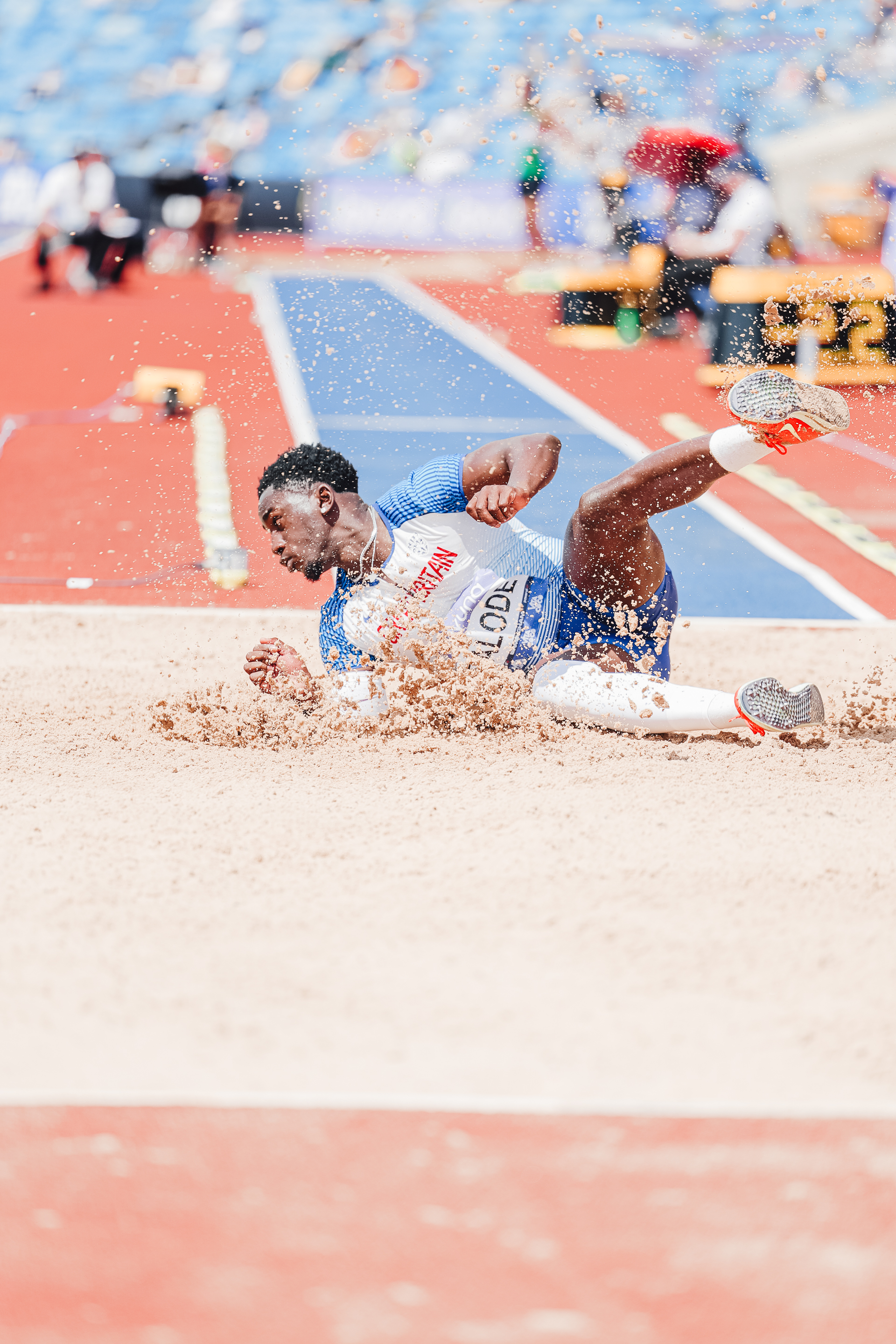
- Daniel Falode at the 2026 British Championships in Birmingham

Personal information
- Full name: Daniel Oluwatoniloba Falode
- Citizenship: British and Nigerian
- Born: 27 November 2002 (age 23) London, England
- Education: Harris Academy Greenwich; Harvard University; Texas A&M University

Sport
- Country: Great Britain
- Sport: Athletics
- College team: Harvard Crimson; Texas A&M Aggies
- Club: Cambridge Harriers
- Coached by: Guy Spencer (2019–)

Achievements and titles
- National finals: 2026 British Champion; 2024 Olympic Trials Finalist (u23); 2021 Olympic Trials Finalist (u20)
- Personal best: Triple jump: 16.39 m (2026)
Medal record
Men's athletics
UK Championships
| Gold medal – first place | 2026 Birmingham | Triple Jump |

Daniel Falode (born 27 November 2002) is a British triple jumper. He won the 2026 UK Athletics Championships.

== Biography ==
From London, Falode attended Harris Academy in Greenwich. A member of Cambridge Harriers, he set a triple jump personal best of 15.90 metres in February 2020, an U18 British Indoor Record, before going on to win the British U20 indoor title with a jump of 15.77 metres that month. He was invited onto the British Athletics Olympic Futures Academy programme in 2021. That summer, he was selected for the 2021 European Athletics U20 Championships in Tallinn, Estonia, where he placed fifth overall in the triple jump final with a jump of 15.81 metres.

Competing for Harvard University in the United States, Falode won six back to back Ivy-League championship titles (3-indoor and 3 outdoor) as well as All American honours at the 2024 NCAA Indoor Championships before redshirting his senior year.

Having transferred to the Texas A&M University ahead of the 2026 season, Falode went over 16 metres for the first time at the Alumni Muster home meet at E.B Cushing Stadium in College Station with a jump of 16.07 metres. He then jumped a season’s and personal best 16.39 metres at the NCAA West Regionals in Fayetteville, Arkansas in May 2026, before placing ninth overall at the 2026 NCAA Outdoor Championships on 12 June, with 16.20 metres. On 21 June, he won his first national title at the 2026 UK Athletics Championships in Birmingham, after landing a final round jump of 15.76 metres to take the win from Jude Bright-Davies.
