= Jack Kavanagh (runner) =

British long-distance runner

Personal information
- Nationality: British (English)
- Born: England
- Height: 1.83 m (6 ft 0 in)

Sport
- Sport: Athletics
- Event: Long-distance running

Achievements and titles
- Personal bests: 1500m: 3:38.61 (Twickenham, 2025); 3000m: 7:50.67 (London, 2026); 5000m: 13:44.95 (London, 2025); Road; 5k 13:34 (Leicester, 2025)

Jack Kavanagh (born 13 April 2000) is a British long-distance runner. In 2026, he became the UK champion in the 5k run. In 2025, he became English champion over 5000 metres and was runner-up to Josh Kerr over that distance at the 2025 UK Athletics Championships.

== Biography ==
Kavanagh grew up in Surrey and attended Hurst Green Infant School, Holland Junior School and Oxted School. He has a family background in athletics, and his grandfather helped build the track at Holland Sports Athletics Club, and although Kavanagh himself trained himself there as a child, he later focused more on team sports such as football.

Kavanagh worked as a teacher in Hurst Green, near Oxted, Surrey, and started running again as a hobby during the Covid-19 pandemic. He completed the 2021 London Marathon for charity in three hours and four minutes. In 2021, he also ran 5 km on the road in 16:32. He began to train again at Holland Sports Athletics Club in Hurst Green where he began to be coached by former Olympic competitor Neil Danby. He also received coaching around aspects such as mindset, nutrition and sleep from former professional footballer Nicky Forster, who also grew up in Hurst Green.

Kavanagh had his first elite race at the PUL5K Friday Night Under the Lights, in Battersea Park in February 2024, where he came second with a time of 14:03. He lowered his 5 km road personal best to 13:48 whilst representing England for the first time at the Home Nations race in Cardiff in August 2024, where he finished in second place.

Kavanagh finished second over 5k at the Armagh International Road Race in February 2025, in a time of 13:35. He ran a personal best on the road of 13:34 for 5 km at the Podium Festival in Leicester in March 2025. In July 2025, Kavanagh became the English champion on the track over 5000 metres. The following month, Kavanagh was runner up behind Josh Kerr over 5000 metres at the 2025 UK Athletics Championships in Birmingham.

Kavanagh ran 13:44 at the FNUL x Adidas x SportsShoes 5 km in Battersea in November 2025, breaking the course record set by Jack Rowe in 2021, and moved to third on the British 2025 list for the distance behind Sam Atkin and Will Barnicoat. In January 2026, Kavanagh ran a 14:48 Parkrun on New Years Day before winning the Senior Men's race at the Surrey Cross Country Championships. In May, he ran a meeting record 13:46.71 to win over 5000 m in Prague at the KPMG Prague Night of PBs. Kavanagh represented Great Britain in the European 10,000m Cup. In June, he ran a personal best of 7:54.09 as he retained his men's 3000 m title at Hercules Wimbledon. In September, he won the UK Athletics 5km Road Race Championships at the SportsShoes Podium Home Nations 5km in Cardiff.
