= Divine Duruaku =

British high jumper (born 2002)

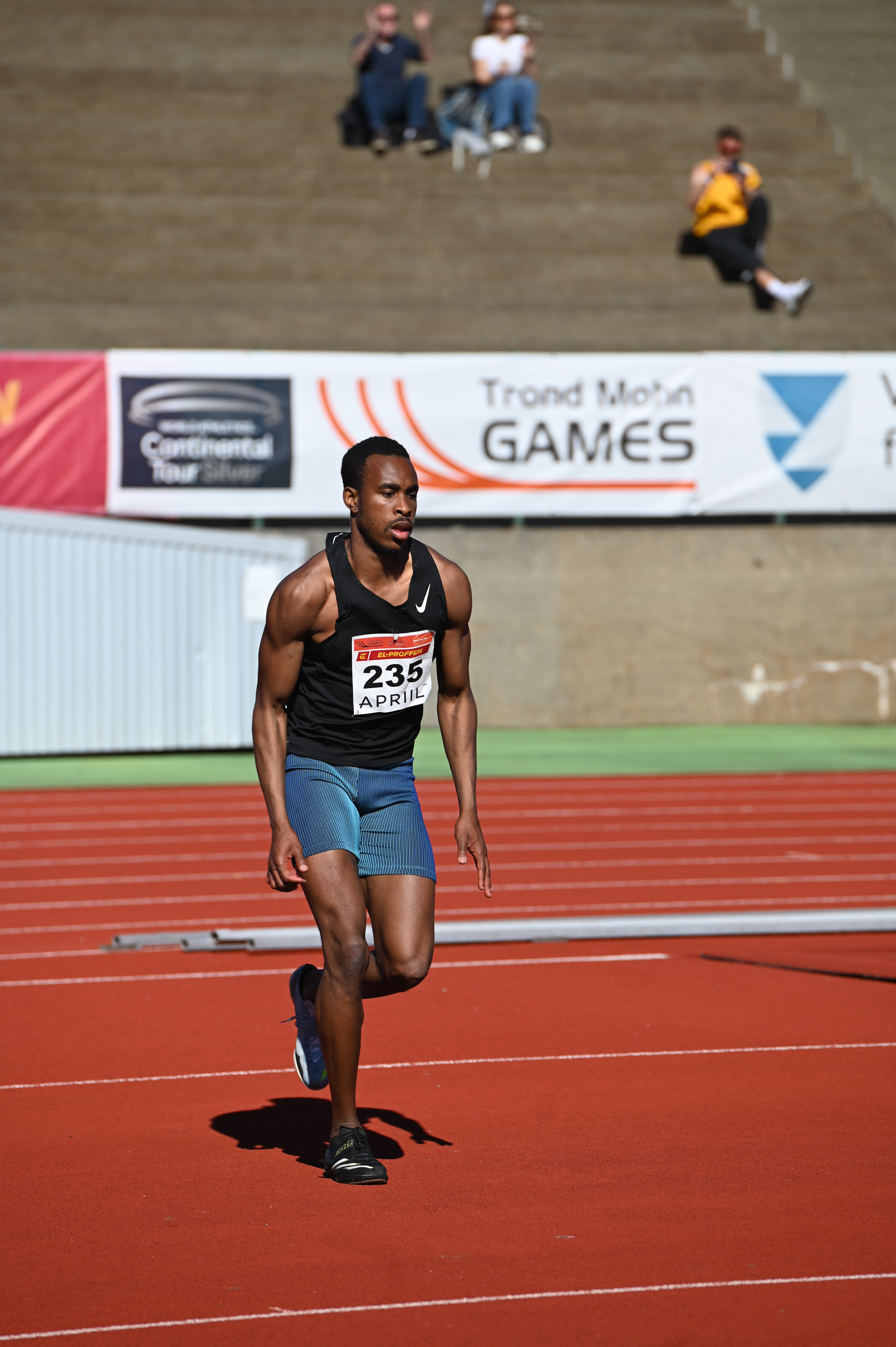
- Duruaku in 2026

Personal information
- Nationality: British (English)
- Born: 10 February 2002 (age 24)

Sport
- Sport: Athletics
- Event: High jump

Achievements and titles
- Personal best(s): High jump: 2.22m (Birmingham, 2026)
Medal record
UK Athletics Championships
Gold medal – first place	2025 Birmingham	high jump

Divine Duruaku (born 10 February 2002) is a British high jumper. He was joint-winner of the 2025 UK Athletics Championships.

== Biography ==
Duruaku competed in the 2022 Loughborough International and won the England Athletics Championships title in Chelmsford in July 2023, with a jump of 2.10 metres.

He finished third in the high jump at the 2024 British Athletics Championships in Birmingham.

In 2025, Duruaku became the British high jump champion, after being a joint-winner of the 2025 UK Athletics Championships in Birmingham on 2 August 2025, alongside Charlie Husbands, with both athletes clearing 2.14 metres and agreeing to share the title.

On 15 February, he jumped 2.15 metres at the 2026 British Indoor Athletics Championships in Birmingham, placing third behind Joel Clarke-Khan and Regan Corrin. That month he jumped a new personal best of 2.21 metres at Cardiff Met JumpsFest in Wales. In April, he improved his personal best to 2.22 metres in Birmingham.
