= Elliot Thompson =

British athlete

Elliott Thompson
Personal information
- Nationality: British (English)
- Born: 10 August 1992 (age 33)

Sport
- Sport: Track and Field
- Event: Decathlon
- Club: Enfield & Haringey AC

Achievements and titles
- Personal best(s): Decathlon: 7204 (Laval, 2022)

Elliott Thompson (born 10 August 1992) is a British athlete. He is the 2022 British champion of decathlon. He is the son of two time Olympic champion decathlete Daley Thompson.

== Biography ==
Thompson graduated with a degree in mechatronics and robotics from Leeds University and played rugby union as a back before suffering a serious shoulder injury. Thompson later worked as a personal trainer.

Thompson took up decathlon in 2016 at the age of 24 years-old. Thompson set a new personal best decathlon score of 7204 points in June 2022. He became national champion in the decathlon at the 2022 British Athletics Championships in Manchester. This came 46 years after his father Daley won his first British national title.

== Personal life ==
He is the son of two time Olympic champion decathlete Daley Thompson. Elliot's brother Alex Clayton played rugby union for the University of Bath and England Sevens.
