= AZS AWF Katowice =

Polish multi-sport team

AZS-AWF Katowice
- Full name: Klub Sportowy Akademickiego Związku Sportowego-AWF Katowice
- Founded: 1971; 54 years ago
- Club colours

AZS AWF Katowice is a Polish women's multi-sport club, based in Katowice.

Some of its most prominent sports include:

- Team handball
- Sport of athletics

== See also ==
- Handball in Poland
- Sports in Poland
