= Isabelle Boffey =

British middle-distance runner

Isabelle Sian Boffey
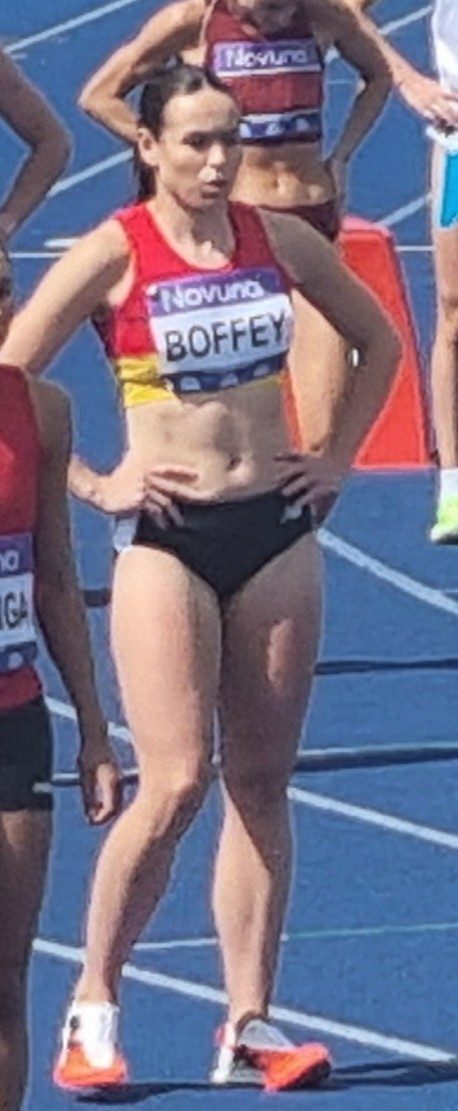
- 2025 UK Athletics Championships

Personal information
- Full name: Isabelle Sian Boffey
- Born: 13 April 2000 (age 26) Enfield, London
- Education: Dame Alice Owen's School; University of Birmingham

Sport
- Country: Great Britain; Wales
- Sport: Athletics
- Event: 800 metres
- Club: Enfield & Haringey
- Coached by: Luke Gunn

Achievements and titles
- Highest world ranking: 19th (800 m)
- Personal bests: Indoors; 800 m: 1:57.43 (Boston 2026)
Medal record
Women's athletics
Representing Great Britain
European U23 Championships
Gold medal – first place	2021 Tallinn	800 m
European U20 Championships
Gold medal – first place	2019 Borås	800 m
Gold medal – first place	2019 Borås	4x400 m relay
European U18 Championships
Gold medal – first place	2016 Tbilisi	800 m

Isabelle Boffey (born 13 April 2000) is a British middle-distance runner. She was the 2023, 2025 and 2026 British indoor champion in the 800 m and she competed at the 2023 World Championships. Her 800 m personal best of 1:57.43, run indoors, ranks her in the ninth all-time for the indoor 800 m and as the second fastest from Great Britain.

A successful junior, Boffey won gold over 800 m at the 2016 European U18 Championships. In 2019, she won gold over both the 800 m and 4×400 m relay at the 2019 European U20 Championships. At the 2021 European U20 Championships, she won gold over 800 m.

== Early life and education ==
Boffey was born in Enfield, London and attended Dame Alice Owen's School. She graduated with a BSc Biomedical Sciences from the University of Birmingham in 2022.

== Career ==
=== 2021–2024: Early career ===
A member of Enfield & Haringey athletics club, she was a successful junior athlete and completed a "clean sweep" of gold medals in the 800 metres at each of the three age-grade championships in European Athletics – at the 2021 European Under-23 Championships held in Tallinn, the 2019 European U20 Championships in Borås and the 2016 European U18 Championships in Tbilisi. She was also part of the England Team at the 2017 Commonwealth Youth Games in the Bahamas.

She first competed for her country as a senior in the women's 800 metres event at the 2021 European Indoor Championships held in Toruń, Poland, finishing sixth. In February 2022, she won the 1000 metres at the Birmingham Indoor Grand Prix.

In February 2023, as a 22-year-old, she claimed her first national title, winning the 800 m at the British Indoor Championships. She competed at the 2023 European Athletics Indoor Championships, but did not make the final. She set a new personal best for the 800 metres in running 1:59.30 in Madrid on 22 July 2023. She competed for Great Britain at the 2023 World Athletics Championships, in Budapest, Hungary. A grade-two hamstring tear ruled her out of action for the majority of the 2024 season.

=== 2025–present: British indoor champion ===
She won the women's 800 metres at the inaugural Keely Klassic in Birmingham on 15 February 2025. She won the final of the 800 metres at the 2025 British Indoor Athletics Championships, in Birmingham, having also been the quickest qualifier. She was selected for the British team for the European Indoor Championships in Apeldoorn, Netherlands. She ran a time of 2:04.28 in her qualifying heat to finish in fourth place and did not progress to the semi-finals.

In May 2025 she opted to compete for Wales, having represented England as a youth athlete. She cited her Welsh mother, who was born and raised in Porthcawl as the reason for the change, with her sights set on representing Wales at the 2026 Commonwealth Games. She was selected to represent Wales for her debut Welsh vest at the 2025 Loughborough International. On 2 August, she qualified for the final of the 800 metres at the 2025 UK Athletics Championships in Birmingham, placing fourth overall in 2:01.68.

On 24 January 2026, Boffey ran an indoor 800 metres personal best of 2:00.14 at the New Balance Indoor Grand Prix, in Boston, Massachusetts. The following week, Boffey lowered her outright personal best by nearly two seconds to move to second on the British all-time indoors list, behind only Keely Hodgkinson, with 1:57.43 to win the 800 m at the John Thomas Terrier Classic in Boston on 30 January, ahead of American champion Roisin Willis and Kenyan Gladys Chepngetich. The time also moved Boffey into the top-ten on the all-time indoors world list. Boffey reached the semi-finals of the 800 m at the 2026 World Athletics Indoor Championships in Toruń, Poland. She was a finalist representing Wales in the 800 metres at the 2026 Commonwealth Games in Glasgow, Scotland, placing fifth overall.

== Achievements ==
Information taken from World Athletics profile unless otherwise noted. Last updated on 6 February 2026.

=== Personal bests ===
Event	Time	Venue	Date	Notes
400 metres	53.21	Birmingham, United Kingdom	15 May 2024	
400 metres indoor	53.39 i	London, United Kingdom	9 Feb 2022	
800 metres	1:57.43 i	Boston, United States	30 Jan 2026	8th all-time and 2nd fastest Brit.
800 metres indoor	1:57.43 i	Boston, United States	30 Jan 2026	8th all-time and 2nd fastest Brit.
1000 metres	2:38.25 i	Birmingham, United Kingdom	19 Feb 2022	
1000 metres indoor	2:38.25 i	Birmingham, United Kingdom	19 Feb 2022	
1500 metres	4:18.39	Manchester, United Kingdom	8 May 2021	

=== International championships and competitions ===
Representing Great Britain & Wales
Year	Competition	Venue	Position	Event	Time
2016	European Youth Championships	Tbilisi, Georgia	1st	800 m	2:07.19
2017	Commonwealth Youth Games	Nassau, The Bahamas	4th	800 m	2:06.67
2018	World U20 Championships	Tampere, Finland	24th (sf)	800 m	2:11.49
2019	European U20 Championships	Borås, Sweden	1st	800 m	2:02.92
2019	European U20 Championships	Borås, Sweden	1st	4 x 400 m relay	3:33.03
2021	European Indoor Championships	Toruń, Poland	6th	800 m	2:07.26
2021	European U23 Championships	Tallinn, Estonia	1st	800 m	2:01.80
2021	European U23 Championships	Tallinn, Estonia	5th	4 x 400 m relay	3:33.06
2023	European Indoor Championships	Istanbul, Turkey	12th (sf)	800 m	2:03.94
2023	European Team Championships First Division	Chorzów, Poland	2nd	800 m	2:00.39
2023	World Championships	Budapest, Hungary	39th (h)	800 m	2:01.40
2024	World Indoor Championships	Glasgow, United Kingdom	18th (h)	800 m	2:02.81
2025	European Indoor Championships	Apeldoorn, Netherlands	18th (h)	800 m	2:04.28
2026	World Indoor Championships	Toruń, Poland	10th (sf)	800 m	2:01.12
2026	Commonwealth Games	Glasgow, United Kingdom	5th	800 m	2:01.44

=== National championships and competitions ===
Year	Competition	Venue	Position	Event	Time
2015	England Indoor Championships, U17 events	Sheffield	1st	800 m	2:12.53
2015	England Championships, U20 events	Bedford	2nd	800 m	2:10.30
2016	England Indoor Championships, U17 events	Sheffield	1st	800 m	2:06.68
2016	England Championships, U20 events	Bedford	1st	800 m	2:06.90
2016	England Championships, U17 events	Bedford	2nd	800 m	2:05.68
2017	England Indoor Championships, U20 events	Sheffield	1st	800 m	2:07.57
2017	England Championships, U20 events	Bedford	1st	800 m	2:05.87
2018	England Championships, U20 events	Bedford	2nd	800 m	2:05.24
2019	British Indoor Championships	Birmingham	4th	800 m	2:05.84
2019	British Championships	Birmingham	4th	800 m	2:03.11
2020	British Championships	Manchester	2nd	800 m	2:04.73
2021	British Indoor Championships	Event cancelled due to the COVID-19 pandemic			
2021	British Championships	Manchester	7th	800 m	2:04.81
2023	British Indoor Championships	Birmingham	1st	800 m	2:03.27
2023	British Championships	Manchester	5th	800 m	2:02.28
2024	British Indoor Championships	Birmingham	2nd	800 m	2:00.27
2025	British Indoor Championships	Birmingham	1st	800 m	2:04.24
2025	British Championships	Manchester	4th	800 m	2:01.68
2026	British Indoor Championships	Birmingham	1st	800 m	1:59.64
