= 2026 British Indoor Athletics Championships =

Indoor track and field competition for British athletes

- Dates: 14-15 February
- Host city: Birmingham, United Kingdom
- Venue: Arena Birmingham
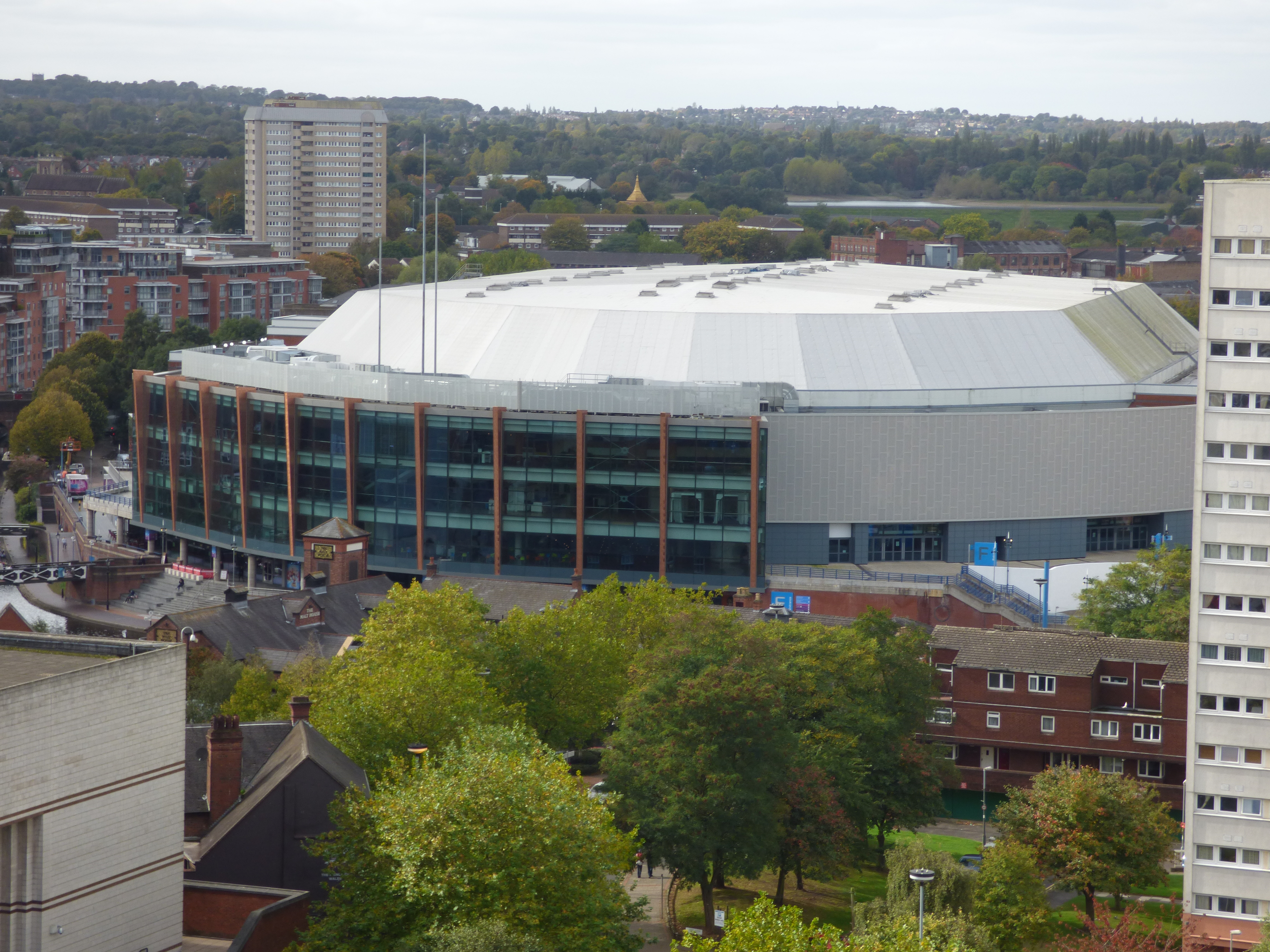
- Level: Senior
- Type: Indoor

The 2026 British Indoor Athletics Championships, also known as the 2026 UK Athletics Indoor Championships, is the national indoor track and field competition for British athletes, held on 14 and 15 February 2026 at Arena Birmingham. The competition serves indirectly as a qualification event for the 2026 World Athletics Indoor Championships shortly afterwards but is not a formal trials.

== Background ==
In the United Kingdom, the championships are shown online by the BBC as part of a multi-event deal with UK Athletics.

== Results ==
=== Men ===
Event	Gold		Silver		Bronze	
60 metres	Jeremiah Azu	6.56	Romell Glave	6.62	Jody Smith	6.63
200 metres	Jeremiah Azu	20.77	Lee Thompson	21.34 PB	Corey Nealon-Richards	21.63
400 metres	Lewis Davey	46.45 SB	Harry Bradley	47.04 PB	Seamus Derbyshire	47.12
800 metres	Ben Pattison	1:46.74	Henry Fisher	1:47.40	Ethan Hussey	1:47.74
1500 metres	Jack Higgins	3:38.12 CR	James McMurray	3:38.36 SB	Henry Jonas	3:38.39
3000 metres	Thomas Keen	7:51.68	Henry McLuckie	7:51.70	Ted Higgins	7:53.21 PB
3000 metres race walk	Cameron Corbishley	11:55.13	Guy Thomas	12:36.46	Fraser Higginson	16:32.68
60 metres hurdles	Daniel Goriola	7.78	Tade Ojora	7.78	Ethan Akkani	7.90
High jump	Joel Clarke-Khan	2.19 m	Regan Corrin	2.19 m	Divine Duruaku	2.15 m
Pole vault	Owen Heard	5.55 m	Jax Thoirs	5.45 m	Thomas Walley	5.25 m
Long jump	Alessandro Schenini	7.53 m	Jack Roach	7.52 m	Daniel Emegbor	7.50 m
Triple jump	Tito Odunaike	15.75 m	Jude Bright-Davies	15.58 m	Harley Henry	15.46 m
Shot put	Scott Lincoln	20.80 m SB	Patrick Swan	17.12 m SB	Dillon Claydon	16.87 m PB
Para 60 Metres	Kevin Santos	6.93	Zac Shaw	7.08	Thomas Young	7.21

The British Athletics Indoor Championships in multievents were held in Glasgow on 28 February and 1 March 2026.

Event	Gold	Silver	Bronze
Heptathlon	Sammy Ball	Callum Newby	Adam Hoole

=== Women ===
Event	Gold		Silver		Bronze	
60 metres	Dina Asher-Smith	7.05 CR	Amy Hunt	7.15	Aleeya Sibbons	7.29
200 metres	Renee Regis	22.95 CR	Hannah Brier	23.37	Brooke Ironside	23.92
400 metres	Yemi Mary John	51.69	Louisa Stoney	51.83	Amber Anning	51.83
800 metres^{§}	Isabelle Boffey	1:59.64	Emily Simpson	2:01.43	Shakira King	2:01.49
1500 metres	Jemma Reekie	4:26.26	Molly Hudson	4:27.21	Revée Walcott-Nolan	4:27.28
3000 metres	Hannah Nuttall	8:41.75 CR	Katie Snowden	8:46.09	Eloise Walker	8:48.45
3000 metres race walk	Bethan Davies	14:00.94	Abigail Jennings	14:11.59	Jessica Wilton	15:01.59 PB
60 metres hurdles	Abigail Pawlett	8.05	Emma Nwofor	8.14	Thea Brown	8.22
High jump	Kate Anson	1.84 m	Thea Brown	1.81 m	Hannah Lake	1.78 m
Pole vault	Molly Caudery	4.65 m	Jade Spencer-Smith	4.25 m	Jade Ive	4.15 m
Long jump	Lucy Hadaway	6.45 m	Alice Hopkins	6.26 m	Molly Palmer	6.22 m
Triple jump	Georgina Forde-Wells	13.53 m	Reese Robinson	13.05 m PB	Leila Newth	12.95 m PB
Shot put	Serena Vincent	17.33 m	Sophie McKinna	16.27 m	Sabrina Fortune	15.12 m
Para 60 Metres	Maddie Down	8.24	Rebecca Scott	8.36	Sophie Hahn	8.38

§ Keely Hodgkinson broke the national and championship records in the heats, but had previously announced she would not race the final.

The British Athletics Indoor Championships in multievents were held in Glasgow on 28 February and 1 March 2026.

Event	Gold	Silver	Bronze
Pentathlon	Thea Brown	Ellen Barber	Lily Holt
