= 2025 UK Athletics Championships =

British athletics event

- Dates: 2–3 August
- Host city: Birmingham, England
- Venue: Alexander Stadium
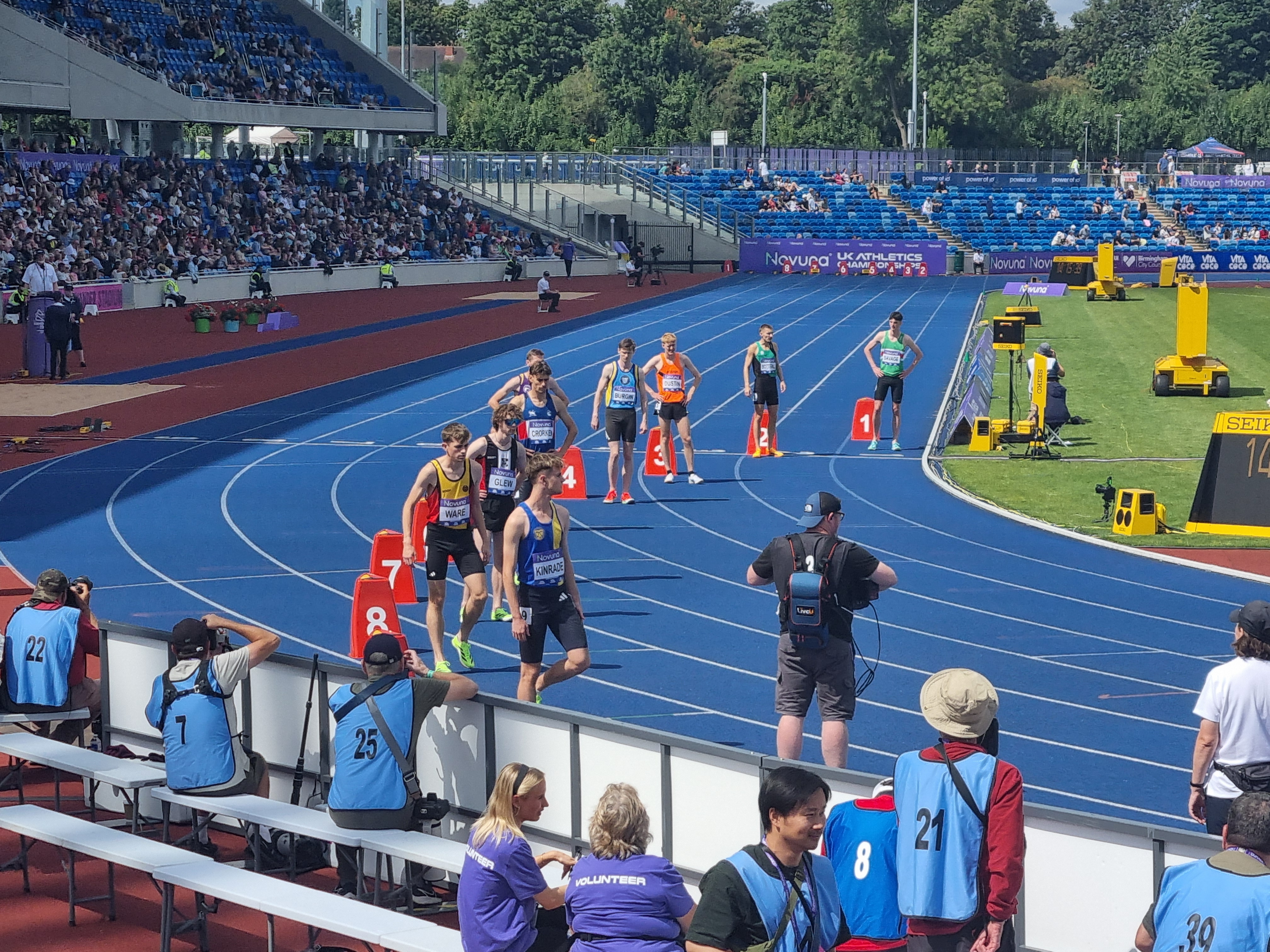
- Level: Senior
- Type: Outdoor

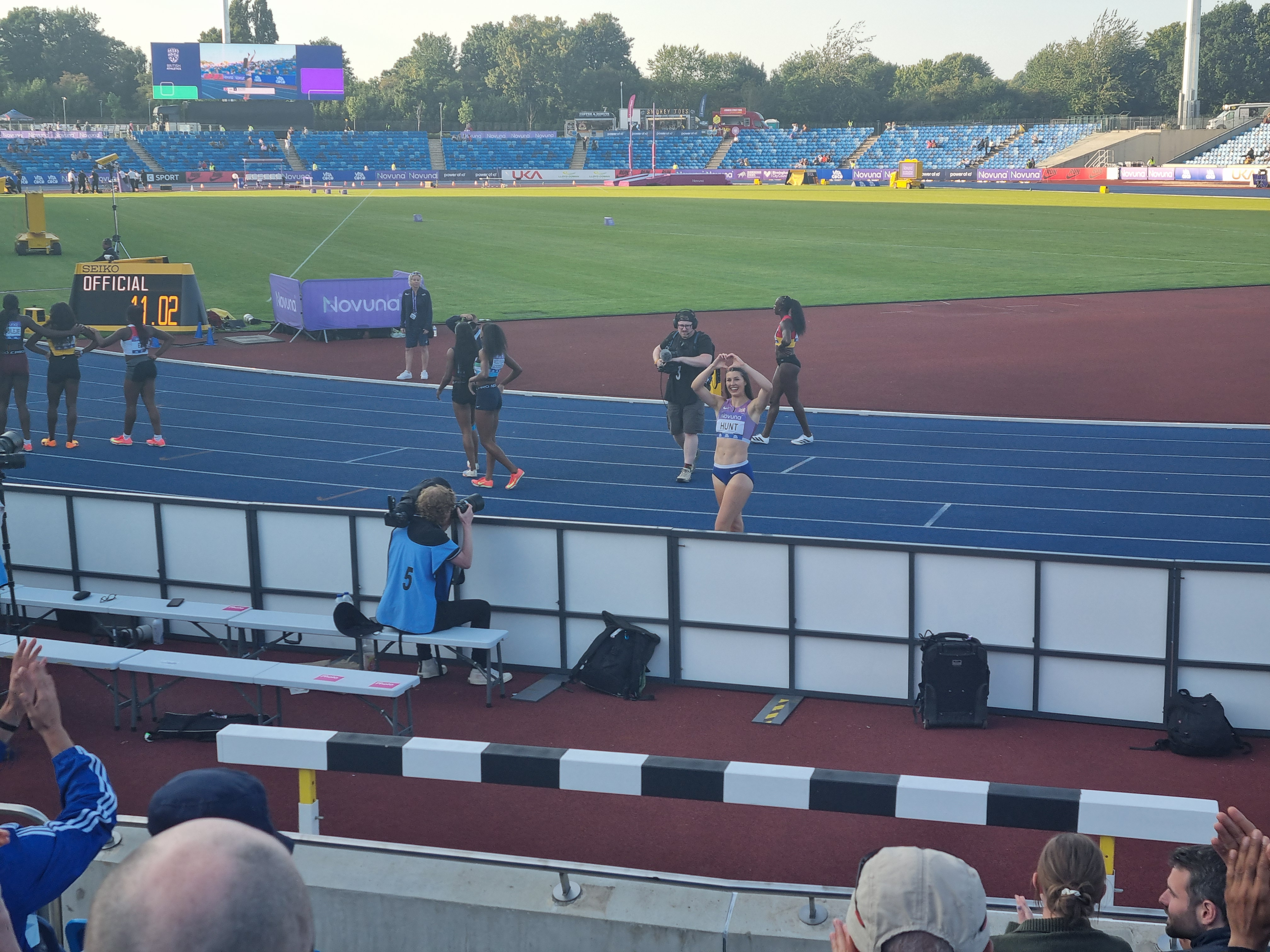
Amy Hunt after 100m final finish.

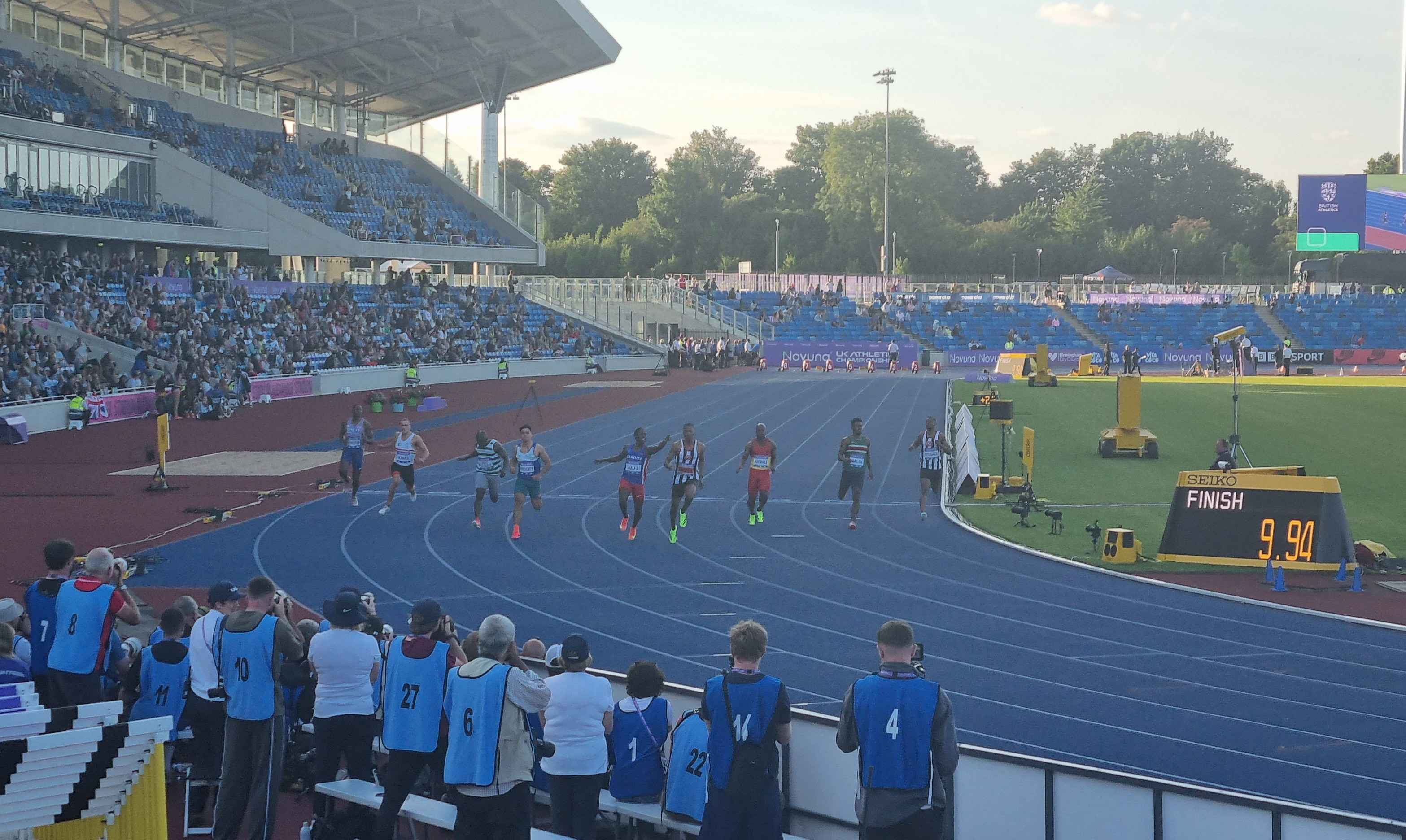
Men's 100m final finish.

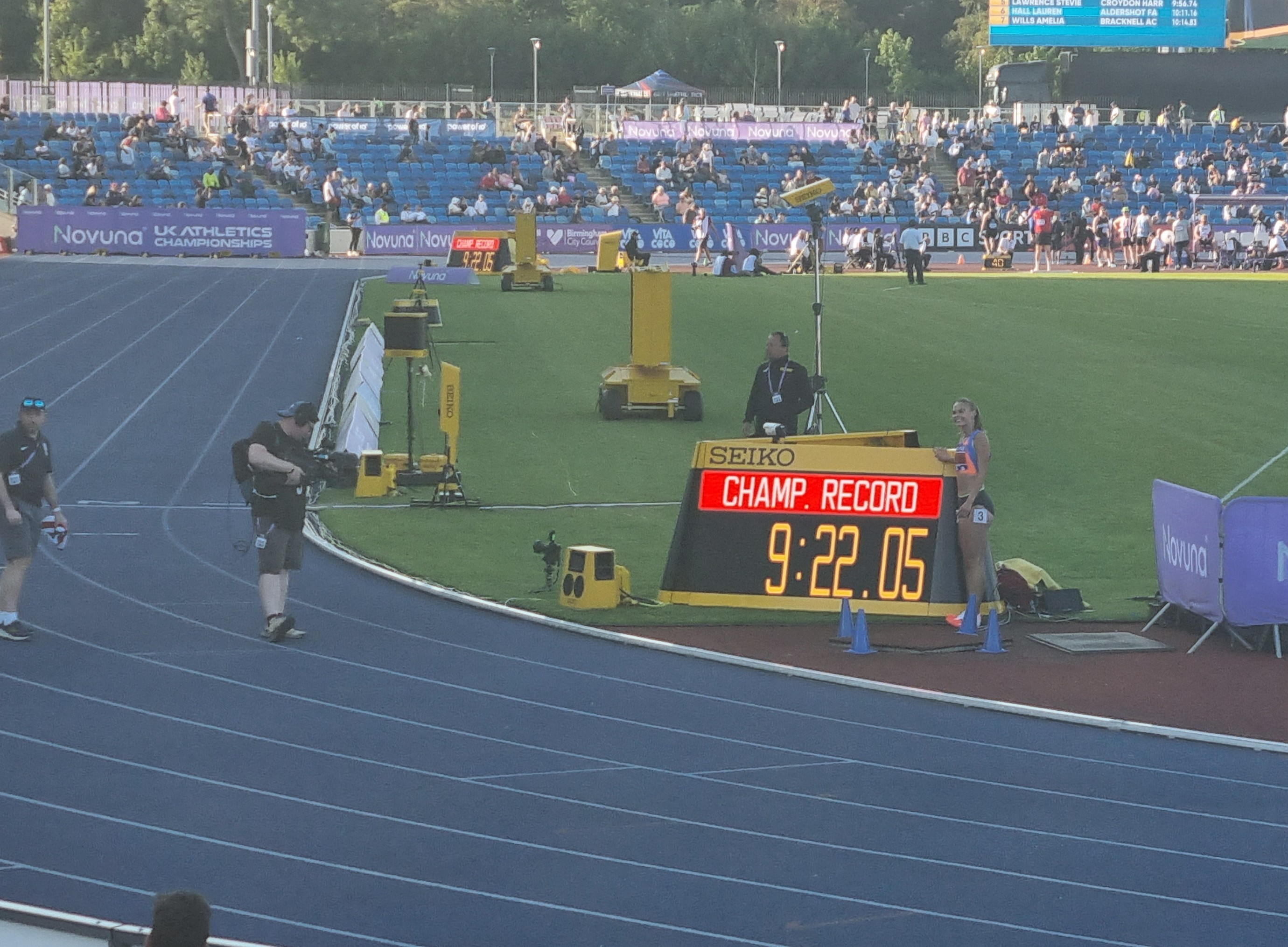
Elise Thorner posing after reaching new championships record.

The 2025 UK Athletics Championships (formally known as the British Athletics Championships) is the 2025 edition of the annual national championships in outdoor track and field for athletes in the United Kingdom, and also serves as a qualifying event or trials for the 2025 World Athletics Championships. The event was sponsored by Novuna and were held from 2 to 3 August 2025. The championships returned to the Alexander Stadium in Birmingham for the first time since 2019.

The 10,000 metres, marathon and decathlon/heptathlon disciplines to determine the British champions in those events will be held separately, at different venues and dates - in all three cases, they were combined with other athletics events.

== World championships qualification ==
Athletes finishing in the top two of each event will gain automatic selection for the World Championships, on condition they have also achieved the World Athletics qualification standard, or alternatively achieve both the UK Athletics consideration standard for the event and a ranking invitation from World Athletics.

Further qualification wildcard places are available for reigning world champions from 2023, namely Josh Kerr in the men's 1500 metres and Katarina Johnson-Thompson in the Heptathlon, and for any British winners of the 2025 Diamond League finals. Wild cards are additional to the three places that can otherwise be attained.

2023 World Championship medalists and 2024 Olympic medalists are guaranteed discretionary selection if they have achieved either the World Athletics Qualification Standard or the UK Athletics Consideration Standard and a World Athletics Invitation, and have shown sufficient form.

- 2023 World Championship individual medalists:
  - Zharnel Hughes, men's 100 metres
  - Matthew Hudson-Smith, men's 400 metres
  - Ben Pattison, men's 800 metres
  - Josh Kerr, men's 1500 metres (wildcard)
  - Keely Hodgkinson, women's 800 metres
  - Katarina Johnson-Thompson, women's heptathlon (wildcard)
- 2024 individual Olympic medalists
  - ~~Matthew Hudson-Smith, men's 400 metres~~
  - ~~Josh Kerr, men's 1500 metres~~
  - ~~Keely Hodgkinson, women's 800 metres~~
  - Georgia Hunter Bell, women's 1500 metres
  - ~~Katarina Johnson-Thompson, women's heptathlon~~

In addition to the wildcard selections, Abigail Pawlett and Jade O'Dowda(heptathlon), Emile Cairess (marathon) and Toby Harries (200 m) were also selected for events other than those in which they competed at the Championships.

== Results ==
Key: Qualification for World Athletics Championships
: qualified by placing and standard; : qualified by discretionary selection; : qualified by wild card

=== Men ===
Event	Gold		Silver		Bronze	
100 metres (+2.2 m/s)	Zharnel Hughes	9.94	Jeremiah Azu	9.97	Louie Hinchliffe	10.01
200 metres (+1.3 m/s)	Zharnel Hughes	19.90 CR	Jona Efoloko	20.42 PB	Ethan Wiltshire	20.51 PB
400 metres	Charlie Dobson	45.36	Lewis Davey	45.61	Toby Harries	45.98
800 metres	Max Burgin	1:43.92	Tiarnan Crorken	1:45:56	Alex Botterill	1:45.67
1500 metres	Neil Gourley	3:47.06	Elliot Giles	3:47.20	Samuel Charig	3:47.42
5000 metres	Josh Kerr	13:44.73	Jack Kavanagh	13:53.35	Rory Leonard	13:54.50
110 metres hurdles (+1.7 m/s)	Tade Ojora	13.34	Daniel Goriola	13.81	Sam Bennett	13.87
400 metres hurdles	Tyri Donovan	49.18	Alistair Chalmers	49.20	Seamus Derbyshire	49.50
3000m s'chase	Phil Norman	8:40.47	Zak Seddon	8:40.67	Mark Pearce	8:41.65
5000 metres walk	Cam Corbishley	19:51.31	Chris Snook	21:38.67	Luc Legon	23:19.99
Long jump	Alessandro Schenini	7.85 m (+2.7 m/s)	Archie Yeo	7.81 m (+1.9 m/s)	Samuel Ebonine	7.80 m PB (+1.4 m/s)
Triple jump	Archie Yeo	15.79 m (−0.2 m/s)	Jude Bright-Davies	15.44 m (Note: Silver awarded on countback) (−0.3 m/s)	Bera Ajala	15.44 m (+0.4 m/s)
High jump	Divine Duruaku Charlie Husbands	2.14 m	not awarded		Kimani Jack	2.14 m
Pole vault	Owen Heard	5.45 m	Adam Hague	5.25 m	Thomas Walley	5.10 m
Shot put	Scott Lincoln	20.77 m	Patrick Swan	18.15 m SB	Mike Jenkins	17.94 m SB
Discus throw	Lawrence Okoye	65.93 m CR	Nicholas Percy	58.95 m	Zane Duquemine	58.89 m
Hammer throw	Jake Norris	74.08 m	Jack Paget	71.06 m	Craig Murch	70.34 m
Javelin throw	Michael Allison	78.48 m PB	Ben East	77.40 m PB	Daniel Bainbridge	76.86 m PB

The UK Athletics 10,000 metre Championships were held on 16 April at the University of Birmingham. The event was open to non-British Athletes, with the three highest ranked Britons receiving the British Championship medals. This format was similar to that previously used at the AAA Championships for all events, the predecessor to the British Athletics Championships.

Event	Gold		Silver		Bronze	
10,000 m	Emile Cairess	27:27.95	Ellis Cross	28:14.47	Logan Rees	28:52.25

The 2025 London Marathon was, as has been the case for several years, designated as the British Championship in that event for 2025. As with the 10,000 metre championships, the highest placed British athletes from the mixed field determine the placings. Emile Cairess was pre-selected by UK Athletics to compete in this event in Tokyo.

Event	Gold		Silver		Bronze	
Marathon	Mahamed Mahamed	2:08:52	Alex Yee	2:11:08 PB	Weynay Ghebresilasie	2:11:21

The 2025 English Athletics Combined Events Championships also incorporate the British National Championships, and are open to Scottish, Welsh and Northern Irish athletes. They will be held between 25 and 27 July 2025.

Event	Gold		Silver		Bronze	
Decathlon	Callum Newby	7441 PB	Oliver Adnitt	7410 PB	Stephen Simmons	7349 PB

=== Women ===
Event	Gold		Silver		Bronze	
100 metres	Amy Hunt	11.02 PB	Desiree Henry	11.32	Faith Akinibileje	11.34
200 metres	Dina Asher-Smith	22.14 CR	Amy Hunt	22.14 PB	Daryll Neita	22.30
400 metres	Amber Anning	50.53	Victoria Ohuruogu	50.79	Yemi Mary John	50.84
800 metres	Georgia Hunter Bell	1:59.53	Jemma Reekie	2:00.97	Abigail Ives	2:01.11
1500 metres	Sarah Calvert	4:16.27	Laura Muir	4:16.32	Revee Walcott-Nolan	4:16.39
5000 metres	Hannah Nuttall	15:46.90	India Weir	15:47.98	Innes Fitzgerald	15:48.66
100 metres hurdles	Alicia Barrett	13.06 SB	Abigail Pawlett	13.12	Emily Tyrrell	13.44 PB
400 metres hurdles	Lina Nielsen	55.39	Emily Newnham	55.64	Hayley McLean	56.94
3000m s'chase	Elise Thorner	9:22.05 CR	Sarah Tait	9:25.17	Cari Hughes	9:41.66 PB
5000 metres walk	Hannah Hopper	24:24.42 PB	Bethan Davies	24:47.93	Abigail Jennings	24:54.56 PB
Long jump	Jazmin Sawyers	6.82 w	Lucy Hadaway	6.50 w	Alice Hopkins	6.28 w
Triple jump	Adelaide Omitowoju	13.62 m PB (+2.0 m/s)	Shanara Hibbert	13.25 m PB (+1.4 m/s)	Silver Nwabuzor	12.90 m (+3.2 m/s)
High jump	Morgan Lake	1.90	Gabrielle Garber	1.83 PB	Halle Ferguson	1.79
Pole vault	Molly Caudery	4.85 m	Tilly Hooper	4.35 m	Felicia Miloro	4.25 m PB
Shot put	Adele Nicoll	17.17	Serena Vincent	16.77	Nana Gyedu	15.64
Discus throw	Zara Obamakinwa	55.90	Kirsty Law	53.87	Sophie Mace	50.08
Hammer throw	Anna Purchase	72.96 m CR	Charlotte Payne	67.59 m	Amber Simpson	65.64 m
Javelin throw	Bekah Walton	58.44	Freya Jones	56.53 PB	Sophie Hamilton	53.53 PB

The UK Athletics 10,000 metre Championships were held on 16 April at the University of Birmingham. The event was open to non-British Athletes, with the three highest ranked Britons receiving the British Championship medals. This format was similar to that previously used at the AAA Championships for all events, the predecessor to the British Athletics Championships.

Event	Gold		Silver		Bronze	
10,000 m	Megan Keith	31:19.88	Calli Hauger-Thackery	31:25.31	Izzy Fry	31:47.60

The 2025 London Marathon incorporated the 2025 British Marathon Championship, as has been the case for several years. The highest placed British athletes determined the placings within the British championship. Calli Hauger-Thackery was pre-selected by UK Athletics to compete in this event in Tokyo.

Event	Gold		Silver		Bronze	
Marathon	Eilish McColgan	2:24:25	Rose Harvey	2:25:01	Philippa Bowden	2:30:28

The 2025 English Athletics Combined Events Championships also incorporate the British National Championships, and are open to Scottish, Welsh and Northern Irish athletes. They will be held between 25 and 27 July 2025.

Event	Gold		Silver		Bronze	
Heptathlon	Ellen Barber	6037	Anna McCauley	5663	Ella Rush	5464

=== Para-athletic events ===
The Championships also hosted a number of para-athletic events. Racing events were freestanding, while field events took place within the able-bodied event.

Event	Gold		Silver		Bronze	
Men's events
100 m ambulant	Thomas Young (T38)	11.19	James Ledger (T11)	11.75	Euan Murray (T64)	12.14
1500 m ambulant (T20)	Kieran O'Hara	4:03.70	Stephen Bryce	4:03.77	Daniel Wolff	4:05.86
Long jump	Luke Sinnot (T61)	6.39	Barney Corrall (T37)	5.40	no other entrants	
Shot put	Michael Jenkins (F38)	17.94	Aled Davies (F42)	16.51	no other entrants	
Javelin (F13)	Daniel Pembroke	63.62 PB	no other entrants			
Discus throw	Daniel Greaves (F44)	55.63	Harrison Walsh (F44)	54.04	Aled Davies (F42)	48.59
Women's events
100 m ambulant	Sophie Hahn (T38)	12.76	Hetty Bartlett (T38)	13.32	Rebecca Scott (T47)	13.60
800 m wheelchair (T34)	Kare Adenegan	2:12.87	Daina Donnelly	2:47.15	Anya Waugh	2:49.02
Long jump (T38)	Olivia Breen	5.00	Madeline Down	4.80	no other entrants	
Shot put	Sabrina Fortune (F20)	15.75	Funmy Oduwaiye (F44)	12.04	no other entrants	
Javelin	Hollie Arnold (F46)	41.37	no other entrants			
Discus throw	Funmi Oduwaiye (F44)	38.77	Bree Cronin (F44)	35.77	no other entrants	
