= 2025 British Indoor Athletics Championships =

Indoor track and field competition for British athletes

- Dates: 22-23 February
- Host city: Birmingham, United Kingdom
- Venue: Arena Birmingham
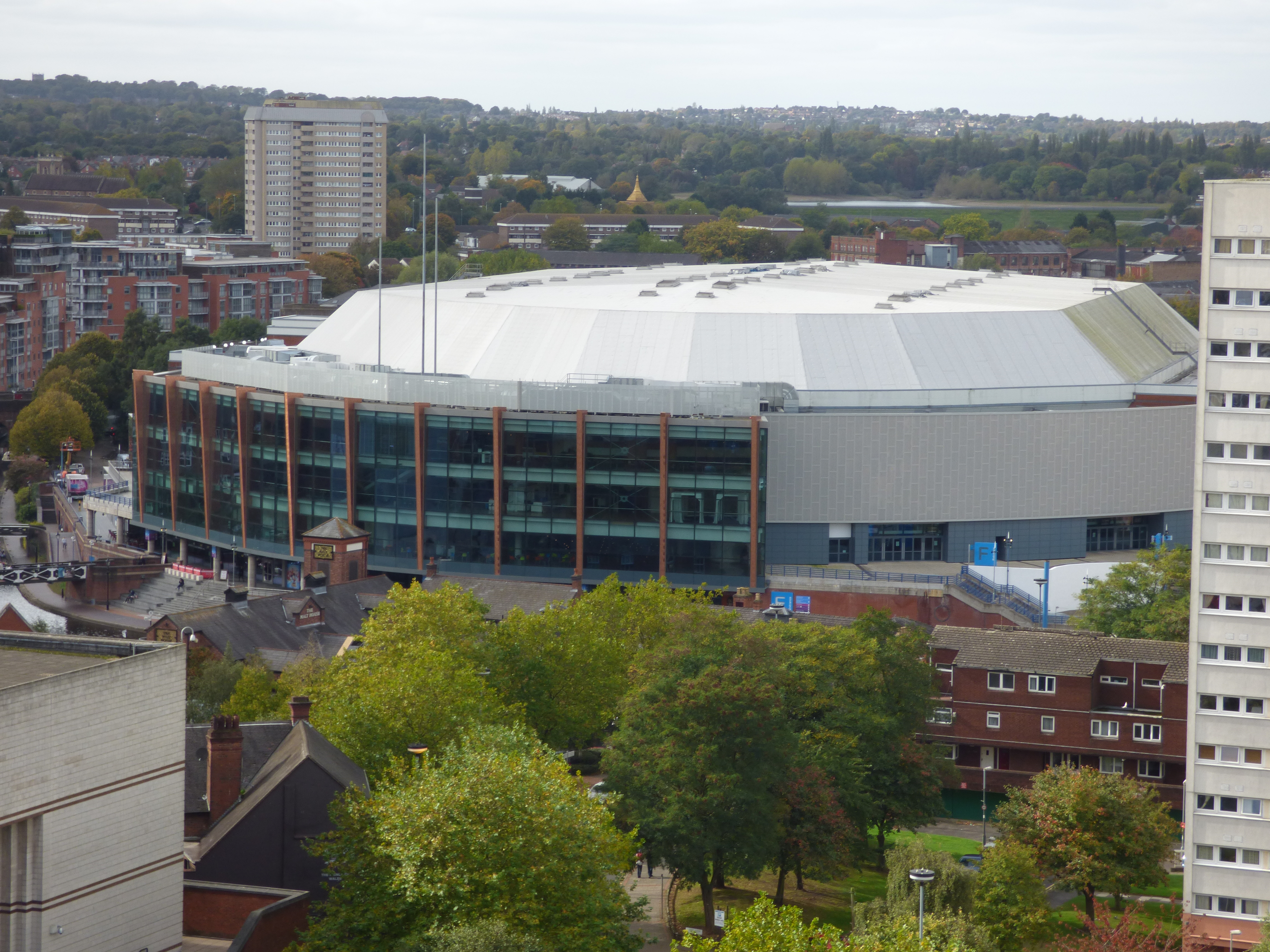
- Level: Senior
- Type: Indoor

The 2025 British Indoor Athletics Championships was the national indoor track and field competition for British athletes, held on 22 and 23 February 2025 at Arena Birmingham. The competition served as a qualification event for the 2025 European Athletics Indoor Championships, and indirectly for the 2025 World Athletics Indoor Championships shortly afterwards.

== Background ==
The 2025 British Indoor Athletics Championships was held on 22 and 23 February 2025 at Arena Birmingham. In the United Kingdom, they were shown online by the BBC.

== Results ==
=== Men ===
Event	Gold		Silver		Bronze	
60 metres	Jeremiah Azu	6.56 SB	John Otugade	6.64	Andy Robertson	6.64
200 metres	Joe Ferguson	20.93 PB	Harry Taylor	21.28	Krishawn Aiken	21.37
400 metres	Alex Haydock-Wilson	46.70	Josh Faulds	46.85 PB	Alastair Chalmers	47.14
800 metres	Justin Davies	1:47.16	Jack Higgins	1:48.02	Thomas Randolph	1:48.11
1500 metres	Neil Gourley	3:38.84 CR	Tom Keen	3:39.97	Tyler Bilyard	3:39.98
3000 metres	George Mills	7:40.16 CR	James West	7:40.33	Henry McLuckie	7:48.88
3000 metres race walk	Callum Wilkinson	11:12.44	Cameron Corbishley	11:49.53	Edson Wilkinson	13:50.51
60 metres hurdles	Daniel Goriola	7.76 SB	Iolo Grant	7.83 PB	William Ritchie-Moulin	7.77 PB
High jump	Otis Poole	2.20 PB	Kimani Jack	2.15	Charlie Husbands	2.11
Pole vault	Owen Heard	5.26	Adam Hague SB; Mark Mellor	5.26 PB	Two silvers, no bronze awarded	
Long jump	Jacob Fincham-Dukes	7.69	Alessandro Schenini	7.65	Sam Danson	7.60 PB
Triple jump	Efe Uwaifo	15.64	Jordan Aki-Sawyerr	15.61 PB	Henry Clarkson	15.45 SB
Shot put	Scott Lincoln	20.86 CR	Patrick Swan	16.97	Chukwuemeka Osammor	16.73 SB
Para 60 Metres	Zac Shaw; T12	7.07	Thomas Young; T38	7.16	James Arnott; T46	7.53

=== Women ===
Event	Gold		Silver		Bronze	
60 metres	Bianca Williams	7.19 PB	Joy Eze	7.25	Cheyanne Evans-Gray	7.26 SB
200 metres	Alyson Bell	23.12 PB	Kissiwaa Mensah	23.50	Jazmine Moss	23.61
400 metres	Amber Anning	51.40	Lina Nielsen	51.77 PB	Ama Pipi	52.10 SB
800 metres	Isabelle Boffey	2:04.24	Grace Vans Agnew	2:04.28	Shaikira King	2:04.64
1500 metres	Georgia Hunter Bell	4:13.23	Revee Walcott-Nolan	4:14.57	Ellie Leather	4:15.82
3000 metres	Hannah Nuttall	8:49.49	Laura Muir	8:50.16	Innes Fitzgerald	8:52.56
3000 metres race walk	Hannah Hooper	14:21.97	Jessica Wilton	15:28.50	only two entrants	
60 metres hurdles	Abigail Pawlett	8.09 PB	Emma Nwofor	8.11 SB	Marli Jessop	8.27 SB
High jump	Morgan Lake	1.94 SB	Emily Borthwick	1.84 SB	Hannah Lake	1.84 PB
Pole vault	Nemiah Munir	4.21	Sophie Ashurst	4.11	Isabella Turner	4.11 PB
Long jump	Alice Hopkins	6.59 SB	Jade O'Dowda	6.43	Leigh Thompson	6.19 SB
Triple jump	Georgina Forde-Wells	13.36	Adelaide Omitowoju	13.29 SB	Amy Warre	12.72
Shot put	Serena Vincent	16.89	Nana Gyedu	16.36	Sabrina Fortune; F20	15.50
Para 60 Metres	Sophie Hahn; T38	8.12 SB	Madeline Down; T38	8.26	Hetty Bartlett; T38	8.57 SB
