= Abigail Jennings =

British race walker (born 2000)

Personal information
- Nationality: British
- Born: 10 July 2000 (age 25)

Sport
- Sport: Athletics
- Event: Racewalking
- Club: Aldershot, Farnham & District AC

Abigail Jennings (born 10 July 2000) is a British racewalking athlete. She has won multiple England and UK national championships, both indoors and outdoors.

== Biography ==
Jennings is coached by Verity Snook and is a member of Aldershot, Farnham and District Athletics Club. In February 2020, she won the women's indoor 5000m race walk at the 2020 British Indoor Athletics Championships in Glasgow.

In February 2022, she set a personal best of 51:46.2 to finish second at the England Athletics Winter Race Walking Championships over 10,000m. In May 2022, she won the England 20k walks title.

She set a personal best of 13:40.33 to win the 2023 British Indoor Athletics Championships title over 3000 metres in February 2023.

In March 2023, she won the England senior title over 10,000 metres at the England Athletics Winter Race Walking Championships in Coventry. She set a personal best over 5000 metres finishing third at the 2023 UK Championships in Manchester in 24:11.68. In June of that year she won national title at the British Grand Prix of Race Walking over 20,000m in Leeds.

She won the England Athletics Championships in July 2023 in Chelmsford in the 5000 metres in 24:37.35, ahead of Hannah Hopper.

In February 2024, she won at the 2024 British Indoor Athletics Championships over 3000 metres in Birmingham. She was runner-up at the 2024 British Athletics Championships in the 5000m race walk in Manchester in June 2024.

She won the British 20km Race Walking Championships in March 2025. She was runner-up at the England Athletics Championships title in July 2025 over 3000 metres behind Hopper.

On 15 February 2026, Jennings placed second in the 3000 metres at the 2026 British Indoor Athletics Championships in Birmingham. On 21 June, Jennings placed second to Bethan Davies in the 5000m walk at the 2026 UK Athletics Championships. In July, she won the 3000 m race walk title at the 2026 England Athletics Championships.
