= Joel Clarke-Khan =

English high jumper (born 1999)

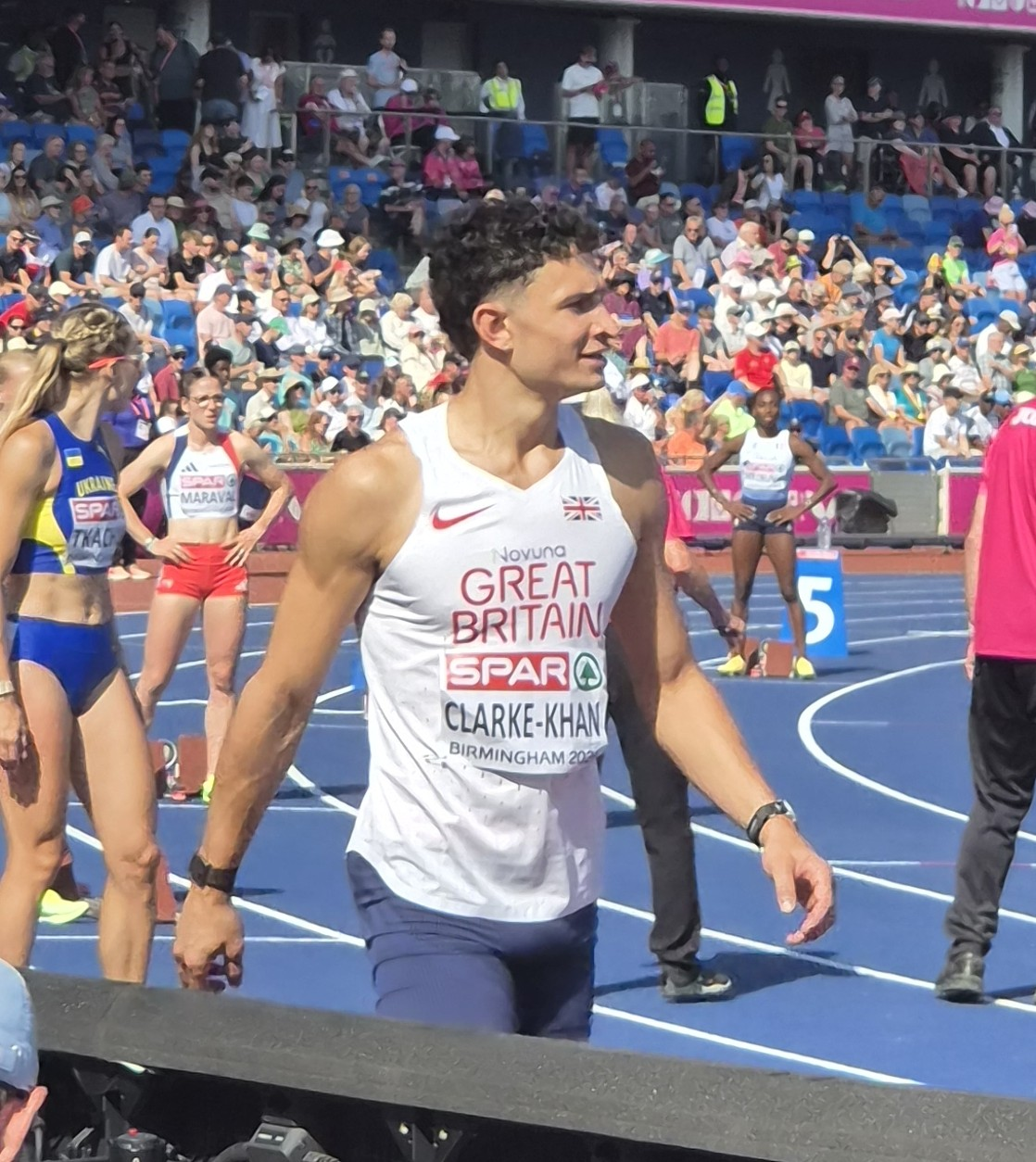
- 2026 European Championships

Personal information
- Nationality: British (English)
- Born: 30 September 1999 (age 26)

Sport
- Sport: Athletics
- Event: High jump
- Club: Worcester
- Coached by: Deirdre Elmhirst

Joel Clarke-Khan (born 30 September 1999) is a British athlete specialising in the high jump. He won the British Athletics Championships in 2020, 2022 2023 and 2026. He competed for Great Britain at the 2022 World Athletics Championships and for England at the 2022 Commonwealth Games.

== Biography ==
From Worcestershire, Clarke-Khan began competing in the high jump at Worcester Athletics Club. Clarke-Khan jumped of 2.15 metres to finish runner-up at the English Schools Championships, in Birmingham, in the U20 Events in July 2017, behind Tom Gale and finishing ahead of the bronze medalist Tom Hewes on countback. He subsequently competed at the 2017 European Athletics U20 Championships in Grosseto, Italy, later in July 2017, where he cleared a height of 2.08 metres which was not enough to qualify for the final.

He became British champion when winning the high jump event at the 2020 British Athletics Championships with a jump of 2.18 metres. Defending his British title in June 2021, he finished second to Tom Gale at the 2021 British Athletics Championships in Manchester with a jump of 2.21 metres.

He regained the British title at the 2022 British Athletics Championships with a clearance of 2.21 metres. He finished fifth overall representing England in the high jump at the 2022 Commonwealth Games in Birmingham, England, clearing a best height of 2.22 metres. He qualified for the final of the 2022 European Athletics Championships in Munich in August 2022. He competed at the 2022 World Athletics Championships in Eugene, Oregon, without reaching the final.

He won the 2023 British Athletics Championships for his third national title, in Manchester in July 2023 with a jump of 2.18 metres. In September 2023, he was training in Loughborough as part of a group alongside Tom Gale and Morgan Lake.

In February 2026, he jumped 2.22 metres competing indoors in the Czech Republic. The following week, he won the 2026 British Indoor Athletics Championships ahead of Regan Corrin.

Clarke-Khan won his fourth outdoor national title at the UK Championships on 20 June 2026 with a best clearance of 2.27 metres.
