= 2019 British Athletics Championships =

- Dates: 24–25 August
- Host city: Birmingham, England
- Venue: Alexander Stadium
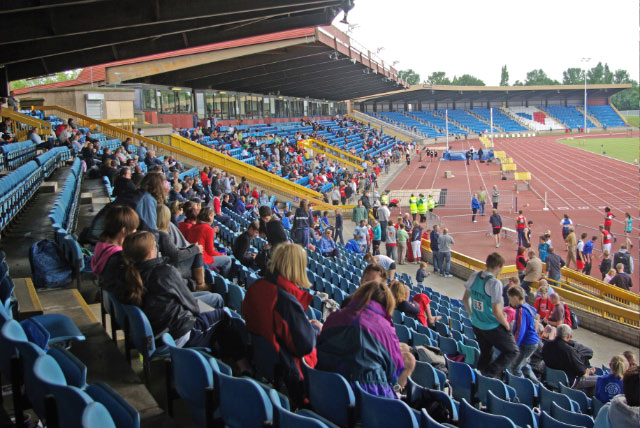
- Level: Senior
- Type: Outdoor

The 2019 British Athletics Championships was the national championship in outdoor track and field for athletes in the United Kingdom, held from 24 to 25 August 2019 at Alexander Stadium in Birmingham. It was organised by UK Athletics. A full range of outdoor events were held up to 5000 metres. The competition served as the main selection event for the 2019 World Athletics Championships.

The British Championships for 10,000 metres were held during the European 10,000m Cup as part of the Night of 10,000 metres PBs event at Highgate Stadium on 6 July. This event also served as the main qualification event for the 2019 World Championships 10,000 m.

Selections for the men's and women's marathons were based on results in the 2019 London Marathon.

== Results ==
=== Men ===
Event	Gold		Silver		Bronze	
Track events
100 metres (−1.9 m/s)	Ojie Edoburun	10.18	Adam Gemili	10.18	Zharnel Hughes	10.18
200 metres (−1.2 m/s)	Adam Gemili	20.08 CR	Zharnel Hughes	20.25	Miguel Francis	20.34
400 metres	Matthew Hudson-Smith	45.15	Cameron Chalmers	45.84	Rabah Yousif	46.32
800 metres	Spencer Thomas	1:46.79	Guy Learmonth	1:46.79	Jamie Webb	1:46.84
1500 metres	Neil Gourley	3:48.36	Josh Kerr	3:48.51	Jake Wightman	3:48.69
5000 metres	Andrew Butchart	13:54.29	Marc Scott	14:01.48	Ben Connor	14:04.33
110 metres hurdles (−2.5 m/s)	David King	13.78	Cameron Fillery	13.78	Jake Porter	13.90
400 metres hurdles	Jacob Paul	49.57	Dai Greene	49.67	Chris McAlister	49.80
3000m s'chase	Zak Seddon	8:36.29	Phil Norman	8:40.61	Ieuan Thomas	8:44.09
5000 metres walk	Callum Wilkinson	18:41.23	Cam Corbishley	20:41.23	Tom Partington	22:07.03
Field events
Long jump	Tim Duckworth	7.92 m (+1.1 m/s)	Dan Bramble	7.92 m (+0.9 m/s)	Feron Sayers	7.82 m (+2.5 m/s)
High jump	Allan Smith	2.25 m	Chris Baker	2.22 m	Tom Gale	2.22 m
Triple jump	Ben Williams	17.27 m PB (+1.1 m/s)	Nathan Douglas	16.88 m (+1.1 m/s)	Nathan Fox	16.47 m (+1.9 m/s)
Pole vault	Harry Coppell	5.71 m CR	Jax Thoirs	5.56 m	Adam Hague	5.46 m
Shot put	Scott Lincoln	19.56 m	Youcef Zatat	18.12 m	Samuel Heawood	17.01 m PB
Discus throw	Nicholas Percy	60.57 m	Lawrence Okoye	58.84 m	George Armstrong	57.67 m
Hammer throw	Nick Miller	76.31 m	Taylor Campbell	74.63 m PB	Osian Jones	73.89 m PB
Javelin throw	Harry Hughes	75.11 m	Joe Dunderdale	70.57 m	Gavin Johnson-Assoon	67.25 m
Night of 10K PBs, Parliament Hill Fields Athletics Track.
10,000 metres	Ben Connor	27:57.60	Nick Goolab	28:10.49	Chris Thompson	28:28.55

=== Women ===
Event	Gold		Silver		Bronze	
Track events
100 metres (−0.9 m/s)	Dina Asher-Smith	10.96 CR	Asha Philip	11.29	Daryll Neita	11.30
200 metres (−4.3 m/s)	Jodie Williams	23.06	Beth Dobbin	23.13	Ashleigh Nelson	23.18
400 metres	Laviai Nielsen	52.04	Emily Diamond	52.39	Zoey Clark	52.52
800 metres	Shelayna Oskan-Clarke	2:02.67	Lynsey Sharp	2:02.79	Alexandra Bell	2:02.87
1500 metres	Sarah McDonald	4:22.94	Jemma Reekie	4:23.41	Dani Chattenton	4:26.03
5000 metres	Eilish McColgan	15:21.38	Jessica Judd	15:35.82	Laura Weightman	15:36.73
100 metres hurdles (−1.6 m/s)	Cindy Ofili	13.09	Alicia Barrett	13.40	Yasmin Miller	13.40
400 metres hurdles	Meghan Beesley	55.81	Jessica Turner	56.06	Jessie Knight	56.31 PB
3000m s'chase	Rosie Clarke	9:46.66	Elizabeth Bird	9:46.95	Aimee Pratt	9:53.24
5000 metres walk	Bethan Davies	21:56.45	Erika Kelly	24:39.08	Madeline Shott	25:33.67
Field events
Long jump	Abigail Irozuru	6.86 m PB (+1.6 m/s)	Shara Proctor	6.84 m (+1.7 m/s)	Jazmin Sawyers	6.71 m (+1.4 m/s)
High jump	Morgan Lake	1.94 m	Katarina Johnson-Thompson	1.90 m	Nikki Manson	1.84 m
Triple jump	Naomi Ogbeta	13.87 m (+0.5 m/s)	Angela Barrett	13.22 m (+1.4 m/s)	Mary Fasipe	13.07 m PB (+0.8 m/s)
Pole vault	Holly Bradshaw	4.73 m CR	Sophie Cook	4.36 m PB	Lucy Bryan	4.25 m
Shot put	Sophie McKinna	17.97 m	Amelia Strickler	17.09 m	Divine Oladipo	16.38 m
Discus throw	Kirsty Law	54.23 m	Amy Holder	54.00 m	Shadine Duquemin	53.23 m
Hammer throw	Jessica Mayho	64.79 m	Annabelle Crossdale	61.95 m PB	Pippa Wingate	58.85 m
Javelin throw	Laura Whittingham	52.39 m	Emma Hamplett	51.01 m	Bethan Rees	49.19 m
Night of 10K PBs, Parliament Hill Fields Athletics Track.
10,000m	Stephanie Twell	31:08.13	Eilish McColgan	31:16.76	Fionnuala McCormack	32:05.29
