= 2018 British Athletics Championships =

- Dates: 30 June-1 July
- Host city: Birmingham, England
- Venue: Alexander Stadium
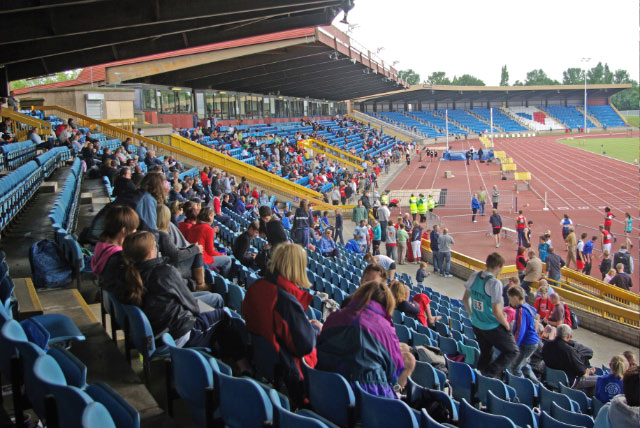
- Level: Senior
- Type: Outdoor

The 2018 British Athletics Championships was the national championship in outdoor track and field for athletes in the United Kingdom, held from 3–5 July 2018 at Alexander Stadium in Birmingham. It was organised by UK Athletics. A full range of outdoor events were held up to 5000 metres. The competition served as the main selection event for the 2018 European Athletics Championships and the 2018 Athletics World Cup.

The British Championships for 10,000 metres were held during the European 10,000 metres Cup as part of the Night of 10,000 metre PBs event at Highgate earlier in the year. This event also served as the main qualification event for the 2018 European Athletics Championships for 10,000m.

Selections for the men's and women's marathons were based on results in the 2018 London Marathon.

== Results ==
=== Men ===
Event	Gold		Silver		Bronze	
Track events
100m	Reece Prescod	10.06	Zharnel Hughes	10.13	Chijindu Ujah	10.18
200m	Nethaneel Mitchell-Blake	20.24	Adam Gemili	20.26	Leon Reid	20.31
400m	Matthew Hudson-Smith	44.68	Rabah Yousif	45.39	(Guernsey) Cameron Chalmers	45.79
800m	Elliot Giles	1:45.46	Daniel Rowden	1:45.83	(Scotland) Guy Learmonth	1:46.42
1,500m	(Scotland) Chris O'Hare	3:46.72	(Scotland) Jake Wightman	3:46.86	(Scotland) Neil Gourley	3:46.87
5,000m	Marc Scott	13:47.00	Andy Vernon	13:47.81	Chris Thompson	13:49.85
110m hurdles	Andy Pozzi	13.61	Dave King	13.81	Khai Riley-La Borde	13.96
400m hurdles	Dai Greene	50.06	Jack Green	50.13	Sebastian Rodger	50.18
3000m s'chase	Zac Seddon	8:33.12	(Wales) Ieuen Thomas	8:33.88	Jamaine Coleman	8:38.17
5000m walk	Tom Bosworth	19:01.20	Callum Wilkinson	19:17.41	Tom Partington	21:36.64
Field events
long jump	Tim Duckworth	8.00	Dan Bramble	7.99	Feron Sayers	7.98
high jump	Chris Baker	2.26	(Scotland) David Smith	2.26	(Scotland) Allan Smith	2.23
triple jump	Nathan Douglas	16.83	Julian Reid	16.70	Jonathan Ilori	16.25
pole vault	Charlie Myers	5.55	Adam Hague	5.45	Harry Coppell	5.35
shot put	Scott Lincoln	18.44	Youcef Zatat	18.01	Gareth Winter	17.28
discus throw	(Wales) Brett Morse	58.90	Greg Thompson	58.10	(Scotland) Nicholas Percy	57.26
hammer throw	Nick Miller	75.33	(Scotland) Chris Bennett	73.29	(Scotland) Mark Dry	71.40
javelin throw	James Whiteaker	71.29	Joe Dunderdale	67.53	Joe Harris	66.11
Night of 10k PBs, Parliament Hill Fields Athletics Track.
10,000 metres	Alex Yee	27:51.94	Andy Vernon	27:52.32	Christopher Thompson	27:25.56

=== Women ===
Event	Gold		Silver		Bronze	
Track events
100m	Dina Asher-Smith	10.97 CR	Daryll Neita	11.19	Bianca Williams	11.20
200m	(Scotland) Beth Dobbin	22.59 CR	Bianca Williams	22.60	Jodie Williams	22.78
400m	Anyika Onuora	51.95	Laviai Nielsen	51.99	Amy Allcock	52.10
800m	(Scotland) Laura Muir	2:01.22	Shelayna Oskan-Clarke	2:01.94	Adelle Tracey	2:02.00
1,500m	Laura Weightman	4:08.80	(Scotland) Jemma Reekie	4:09.10	Sarah McDonald	4:09.28
5,000m	(Scotland) Stephanie Twell	16:07.24	Melissa Courtney	16:07.59	(Scotland) Eilish McColgan	16.08.06
100m hurdles	Alicia Barrett	13.28	Megan Marrs	13.37	Jessica Hunter	13.37
400m hurdles	Meghan Beesley	55.73	(Scotland) Kirsten McAslan	56.48	Jessica Turner	57.10
3000m s'chase	Rosie Clarke	9:45.83	Iona Lake	10:08.61	Emily Moyes	10:18.00
5000m walk	(Wales) Bethan Davies	22:04.98	Abigail Jennings	26:00.31	Natalie Myers	26:39.76
Field events
long jump	Lorraine Ugen	7.05 CR	Jazmin Sawyers	6.86	Shara Proctor	6.81
high jump	Morgan Lake	1.97 CR	Katarina Johnson-Thompson	1.90	(Scotland) Nikki Manson	1.87
triple jump	Naomi Ogbeta	13.95	Laura Samuel	13.75	Sineade Gutzmore	13.51
pole vault	Holly Bradshaw	4.60	Sophie Cook	4.25	Sally Peake	4.15
shot put	Amelia Strickler	17.22	Sophie McKinna	17.10	Rachel Wallader	16.71
discus throw	Jade Lally	56.81	(Scotland) Kirsty Law	54.63	Phoebe Dowson	53.05
hammer throw	Sophie Hitchon	72.02 CR	Jessica Mayho	65.21	Rebecca Keating	61.13
javelin throw	Laura Whittingham	55.55	Emma Hamplett	49.54	Bethan Rees	48.30
Night of 10k PBs, Parliament Hill Fields Athletics Track.
10,000m	Charlotte Arter	32:15.74	Phillippa Bowden	32:33.10	Louise Small	32.34.73
