= 2016 British Athletics Championships =

- Dates: 24-26 June
- Host city: Birmingham, England
- Venue: Alexander Stadium
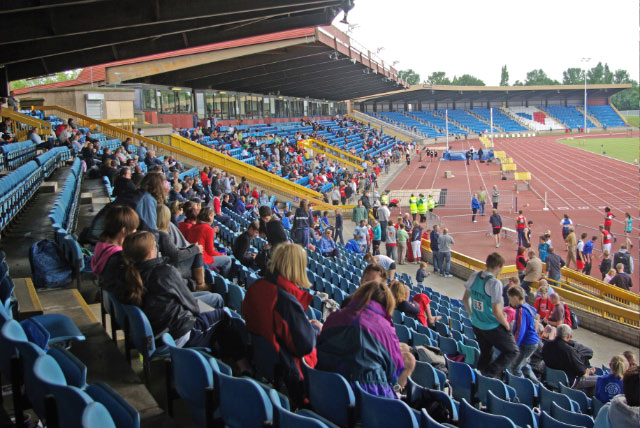
- Level: Senior
- Type: Outdoor

The 2016 British Athletics Championships was the national championship in outdoor track and field for the United Kingdom held at Alexander Stadium, Birmingham, from 24–26 June 2016. The event was organised by UK Athletics. A full range of outdoor events were held.

The championships served as the main qualification event for the Great Britain and Northern Ireland team at the 2016 Summer Olympics for all events except combined events, marathons, race walks and the 10,000 metres. In addition, shorter track walking events were held during the British Championships that did not involve qualification for the 2016 Summer Olympics.

== Medal summary ==
=== Men ===
Key:
≠ Qualified for 2016 Summer Olympics at trials
≠ Selected other than from trials.

Event	Gold		Silver		Bronze	
100m(w 3.0 m/s)	James Dasaolu ≠	9.93w	James Ellington ≠	9.96w	Chijindu Ujah	9.97w
200m(w -0.1 m/s)	Adam Gemili ≠	20.44	Danny Talbot ≠	20.46	Reece Prescod	20.84
400m	Matthew Hudson-Smith ≠	44.88	Rabah Yousif ≠	45.52	Martyn Rooney	46.01
800m	Elliot Giles	1:48.00	Jamie Webb	1:48.49	Michael Rimmer	1:48.78
1,500m	Charlie Grice ≠	3:43.41	(Scotland) Chris O'Hare ≠	3:43.68	(Scotland) Jake Whitman	3:43.90
5,000m	(Scotland) Andrew Butchart ≠	13:44.00	Tom Farrell ≠	13.47:60	Andy Vernon	13:49.28
110m hurdles	Andrew Pozzi ≠	13.31	Lawrence Clarke ≠	13.44	David King	13.57
400m hurdles	Sebastian Rodger	49.45	Jack Green ≠	49.49	Rhys Williams	49.90
3000m s'chase	Rob Mullett	8:41.67	Tom Wade	8:43.40	Zak Seddon	8:46.63
5000m walk	(Australia) Dane Bird-Smith	19:08.76	Tom Bosworth	19:13.56	Callum Wilkinson	19:54.47
high jump	Robbie Grabarz ≠	2.26	Chris Baker ≠	2.26	(Scotland) Allan Smith	2.23
pole vault	Luke Cutts ≠	5.40	Steven Lewis (Scotland) Jax Thoirs	5.25	n/a	
long jump	Daniel Gardiner	7.67	(Turks and Caicos Islands) Ifeanyi Otuonye	7.66	JJ Jegede	7.59
triple jump	Nathan Douglas	16.58	Julian Reid	16.45	Ben Williams	16.31
shot put	Scott Lincoln	19.03	Anthony Oshodi	17.43	Gareth Winter	17.28
discus throw	(Scotland) Nicholas Percy	60.43	(Wales) Brett Morse	60.34	Zane Duquemin	58.75
hammer throw	(Scotland) Chris Bennett	75.67	(Scotland) Mark Dry	74.92	Nick Miller	72.21
javelin throw	Matti Mortimore	74.40	Joe Dunderdale	71.87	James Whiteaker	71.84

=== Women ===
Event	Gold		Silver		Bronze	
100m	Asha Philip ≠	11.17	Daryll Neita ≠	11.24	Desiree Henry	11.28
200m	Dina Asher-Smith ≠	23.11	Desiree Henry ≠	23.13	Jodie Williams	23.22
400m	Emily Diamond ≠	51.94	Seren Bundy-Davies ≠	52.38	Anyika Onuora	52.57
800m	Shelayna Oskan-Clarke ≠	2:01.99	(Scotland) Lynsey Sharp ≠	2:02.14	Alison Leonard	2:02.45
1,500m	(Scotland) Laura Muir ≠	4.10:14	Laura Weightman ≠	4:11.76	Charlene Thomas	4:11.84
5,000m	(Scotland) Stephanie Twell ≠	15:53.35	(Scotland) Eilish McColgan ≠	15:54.75	(Scotland) Laura Whittle	15:56.63
100m hurdles	Tiffany Porter ≠	12.91	Cindy Ofili ≠	12.93	Lucy Hatton	13.21
400m hurdles	(Scotland) Eilidh Doyle ≠	54.93	Jessica Turner	57.34	Bethan Close	57.70
3000m s'chase	Rosie Clarke	9:52.20	(Scotland) Lennie Waite ≠	9:54.06	Louise Webb	9:57.18
5000m walk	(Wales) Bethan Davies	22:03.82	Sophie Lewis Ward	24:24.47	Brianna Mulvee	24:35.56
high jump	Morgan Lake ≠	1.90	Bethan Partridge	1.82	Niamh Emerson	1.82
pole vault	Holly Bradshaw ≠	4.60	Sally Peake	4.15	Jade Ive	4.15
long jump	Jazmin Sawyers ≠	6.75	Shara Proctor ≠	6.65	Holly Mills	6.23
triple jump	Laura Samuel	14.09	Sineade Gutzmore	13.53	Yamile Aldama	13.07
shot put	Rachel Wallader	16.67	Sophie McKinna	16.16	Adele Nicoll	16.14
discus throw	Jade Lally ≠	59.15	Eden Francis	56.24	(Scotland) Kirsty Law	52.19
hammer throw	Sophie Hitchon ≠	69.99	Sarah Holt	63.72	Carys Parry	61.78
javelin throw	Joanna Blair	57.44	Goldie Sayers	54.98	Laura Whittingham	52.33

== Other Olympic trials ==
A number of qualification trials were held at other meetings to earn a place for the 2016 Summer Olympics, in addition to a small number of preselected athletes:

Key:
≠ Qualified for 2016 Summer Olympics at trials
≠ Selected other than from trials.

- 10000 metres: Highgate Night of 10,000 m PBs:at Parliament Hill Fields Athletics Track. The top two British finishers in each race qualified if they have the qualification time. Jess Andrews made the qualification time to win the event, while Beth Potter, the second Briton, already had the time and also qualified automatically. In the men's race, neither of the top two British finishers made the qualification time. Following the event, however, Ross Millington made the time and secured qualification. World and Olympic champion Mo Farah has been pre-selected for the event at Rio.

Track

Event	Gold		Silver		Bronze	
10000 metres, Men	Ross Millington ≠	28.28.2	(Spain) Juan Antonio Perez	28.30.1	Dewi Griffiths	28.34.4
10000 metres, Women	Jessica Andrews ≠	31:58.0	(Kenya) Linet Masai	32.02.05	(Scotland) Beth Potter ≠	32.05.4
Preselected*	Men; Mo Farah					

- Race walks:
- Combined events: Hypo-Meeting at Gotzis : Athletes had to achieve a top 12 finish and have the qualification score to achieve selection through the Hypo-Meeting event. Katarina Johnson-Thompson achieved the necessary place and score to confirm selection. World and Olympic champion, Jessica Ennis-Hill, was pre-selected.
- Marathon: 2016 London Marathon
