= 2017 British Athletics Championships =

- Dates: 1–2 July
- Host city: Birmingham, England
- Venue: Alexander Stadium
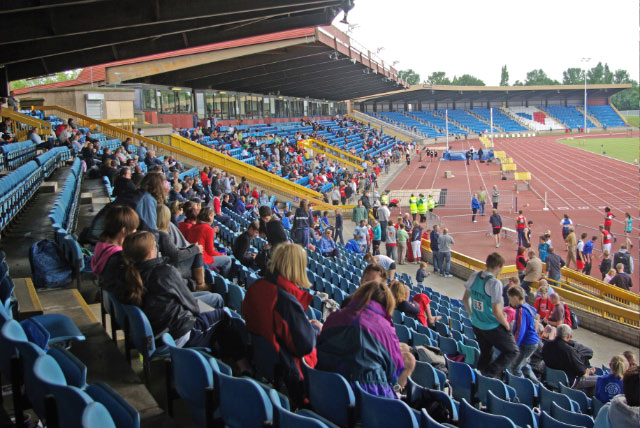
- Level: Senior
- Type: Outdoor

The 2017 British Athletics Championships was the national championship in outdoor track and field for athletes in the United Kingdom, held from 1–2 July 2017 at Alexander Stadium in Birmingham. It was organised by UK Athletics. A full range of outdoor events were held up to 5000 metres. The competition served as the main selection event for the 2017 World Championships in Athletics.

== Results ==
=== Men ===
Event	Gold		Silver		Bronze	
100m (Wind: +0.0 m/s)	Reece Prescod	10.09	James Dasaolu	10.11	Harry Aikines-Aryeetey	10.20
200m (Wind: +0.8 m/s)	Nethaneel Mitchell-Blake	20.18 CR	Danny Talbot	20.20	Leon Reid	20.38
400m	Matthew Hudson-Smith	44.99	Rabah Yousif Bkheit	45.82	Cameron Chalmers	46.11
800m	Elliot Giles	1:49.52	(Scotland) Guy Learmonth	1:49.89	Kyle Langford	1:50.13
1,500m	(Scotland) Chris O'Hare	3:47.28	(Scotland) Josh Kerr	3:47.71	(Scotland) Jake Wightman	3:47.74
5,000m	(Scotland) Andrew Butchart	13:50.56	Andy Vernon	13:54.63	Ben Connor	13:56.71
110m hurdles (Wind: +2.1 m/s)	David King	13.55w	Khai Riley-La Borde	13.71w	Jake Porter	13.79w
400m hurdles	Jack Green	49.34	Jacob Paul	49.66	Sebastian Rodger	50.23
3000m s'chase	Rob Mullett	8:41.43	Zak Seddon	8:43.14	(Wales) Ieuan Thomas	8:43.77
high jump	Robbie Grabarz	2.26 m	Chris Baker	2.20 m	Mike Edwards	2.20 m
pole vault	Luke Cutts	5.45 m	(Scotland) Jax Thoirs	5.40 m	Harry Coppell	5.30 m
long jump	Dan Bramble	8.02 m	Feron Sayers	7.95 m w	Jacob Fincham-Dukes	7.90 m
triple jump	Ben Williams	16.71 m	Nathan Fox	16.42 m	Nonso Okolo	16.29 m
shot put	Scott Lincoln	17.82 m	Gareth Winter	17.35 m	Youcef Zatat	16.68 m
discus throw	(Scotland) Nicholas Percy	60.78 m	Zane Duquemin	60.36 m	(Wales) Brett Morse	60.12 m
hammer throw	Nick Miller	74.98 m	Taylor Campbell	72.87 m	(Scotland) Mark Dry	70.51 m
javelin throw	Joe Dunderdale	73.58 m	Matti Mortimore	72.19 m	Joe Harris	70.50 m
5000m walk	Tom Bosworth	18:43.28 NR	Callum Wilkinson	18:56.96	Damian Blocki	19:43.39

=== Women ===
Event	Gold		Silver		Bronze	
100m (Wind: -1.3 m/s)	Asha Philip	11.21	Daryll Neita	11.25	Ashleigh Nelson	11.28
200m (Wind: 0.0 m/s)	Shannon Hylton	22.94	Bianca Williams	23.05	Desirèe Henry	23.14
400m	(Scotland) Zoey Clark	52.30	Emily Diamond	52.34	Anyika Onuora	52.82
800m	Shelayna Oskan-Clarke	2:01.54	Adelle Tracey	2:01.80	(Scotland) Lynsey Sharp	2:01.81
1,500m	Laura Weightman	4:06.49	Jessica Judd	4:07.09	Sarah McDonald	4:08.14
5,000m	(Scotland) Stephanie Twell	15:35.50	(Scotland) Eilish McColgan	15:38.57	Charlotte Arter	15:43.46
100m hurdles (Wind: -1.4 m/s)	Alicia Barrett	13.26	Yasmin Miller	13.29	Jessica Hunter	13.45
400m hurdles	(Scotland) Eilidh Doyle	55.59	Meghan Beesley	56.68	Jessica Turner	56.79
3000m s'chase	Iona Lake	9:57.53	Charlotte Taylor-Green	9:59.58	Katie Ingle	10:02.34
high jump	Morgan Lake	1.96 m	(Scotland) Emma Nuttall	1.83 m	(Scotland) Nikki Manson	1.79 m
pole vault	Holly Bradshaw	4.45 m	Lucy Bryan	4.35 m	Sally Peake	4.25 m
long jump	Lorraine Ugen	6.59 m	Rebecca Chapman	6.54 m	Holly Mills	6.31 m
triple jump	Naomi Ogbeta	13.64 m	Sineade Gutzmore	13.44 m	Jahisha Thomas	13.25 m
shot put	Rachel Wallader	16.70 m	Amelia Strickler	16.59 m	Sophie McKinna	16.23 m
discus throw	Jade Lally	58.14 m	(Scotland) Kirsty Law	52.73 m	Shadine Duqemin	51.31 m
hammer throw	Sophie Hitchon	67.58 m	(Scotland) Rachel Hunter	63.27 m	Sarah Holt	61.53 m
javelin throw	Laura Whittingham	52.07 m	Joanna Blair	51.31 m	Emma Hamplett	51.02 m
5000m walk	(Wales) Bethan Davies	21:21.52 NR	Erika Kelly	23:20.19	Sophie Lewis Ward	24:57.51
