= 2019 British Indoor Athletics Championships =

- Dates: 9–10 February
- Host city: Birmingham, United Kingdom
- Venue: Arena Birmingham
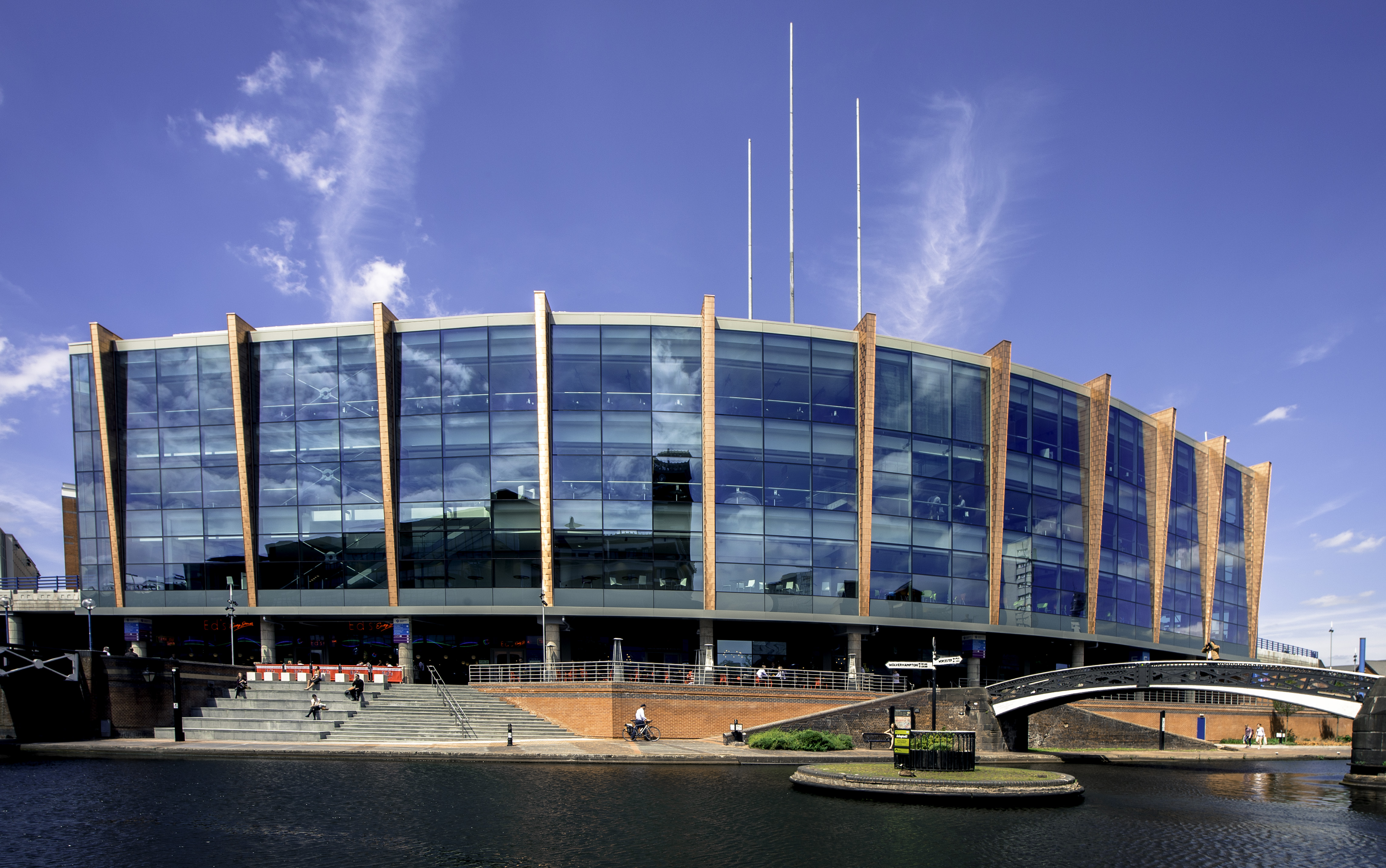
- Level: Senior
- Type: Indoor

The 2019 British Indoor Athletics Championships was the national indoor track and field competition for British athletes, held on 9 and 10 February 2019 at the Arena Birmingham in Birmingham, England. The event served as the team trials for the 2019 European Athletics Indoor Championships.

Holly Bradshaw set a championship record in the women's pole vault, with a clearance of 4.80 metres.

== Medal summary ==
=== Men ===
Event	Gold		Silver		Bronze	
60 metres	Dominic Ashwell	6.64	Adam Thomas	6.66	Jeremiah Azu	6.66
200 metres	Connor Wood	20.94	Chris Stone	20.96	Shemar Boldizsar	21.13
400 metres	Cameron Chalmers	46.26	Owen Smith	46.37	Alex Haydock-Wilson	47.29
800 metres	Joseph Reid	1:48.41	Guy Learmonth	1:48.51	Spencer Thomas	1:49.73
1500 metres	Neil Gourley	3:44.76	Elliot Giles	3:44.93	Piers Copeland	3:45.85
3000 metres	Chris O'Hare	7:52.86	Charlie Grice	7:54.33	Andrew Butchart	7:54.61
5000 metres race walk	Tom Bosworth	19:22.56	Cameron Corbishley	20:29.40	Christopher Snook	21:41.47
60 metres hurdles	David King	7.78	Cameron Fillery	7.80	Khai Riley-LaBorde	7.85
High jump	Chris Baker	2.22 m	Dominic Ogbechie	2.18 m	Tom Gale	2.14 m
Pole vault	Charlie Myers	5.45 m	Harry Coppell Jack Phipps	5.25 m	Not awarded	
Long jump	Feron Sayers	7.72 m	James Lelliott	7.68 m	Reynold Banigo	7.67 m
Triple jump	Michael Puplampu	16.28 m	Nathan Douglas	16.27 m	Nathan Fox	16.12 m
Shot put	Scott Lincoln	19.06 m	Youcef Zatat	17.45 m	Samuel Heawood	16.38 m

=== Women ===
Event	Gold		Silver		Bronze	
60 metres	Asha Philip	7.19	Rachel Miller	7.20	Kristal Awuah	7.35
200 metres	Hayley Mills	23.59	Kiah Dubarry-Gay	24.01	Melissa Roberts	24.28
400 metres	Zoey Clark	52.85	Amber Anning	53.00	Laviai Nielsen	53.03
800 metres	Shelayna Oskan-Clarke	2:05.04	Mari Smith	2:05.68	Adelle Tracey	2:05.72
1500 metres	Jemma Reekie	4:17.08	Sarah McDonald	4:18.10	Katie Snowden	4:19.34
3000 metres	Laura Muir	8:48.03	Melissa Courtney	8:50.61	Amy-Eloise Markovc	8:59.86
5000 metres race walk	Heather Lewis	22:55.15	Madeline Shott	25:15.58	Pagen Spooner	26:43.74
60 metres hurdles	Cindy Ofili	8.16	Katarina Johnson-Thompson	8.27	Gabriella Ade-Onojobi	8.31
High jump	Morgan Lake	1.94 m	Bethan Partridge	1.87 m	Nikki Manson	1.80 m
Pole vault	Holly Bradshaw	4.80 m CR	Jade Ive	4.40 m	Sophie Cook	4.30 m
Long jump	Katarina Johnson-Thompson	6.46 m	Jahisha Thomas	6.36 m	Abigail Irozuru	6.35 m
Triple jump	Naomi Ogbeta	14.05 m	Laura Samuel	13.61 m	Alexandra Russell	13.27 m
Shot put	Sophie McKinna	17.97 m	Amelia Strickler	17.28 m	Adele Nicoll	15.58 m
