= 2020 British Indoor Athletics Championships =

- Dates: 22–23 February
- Host city: Glasgow, United Kingdom
- Venue: Emirates Arena
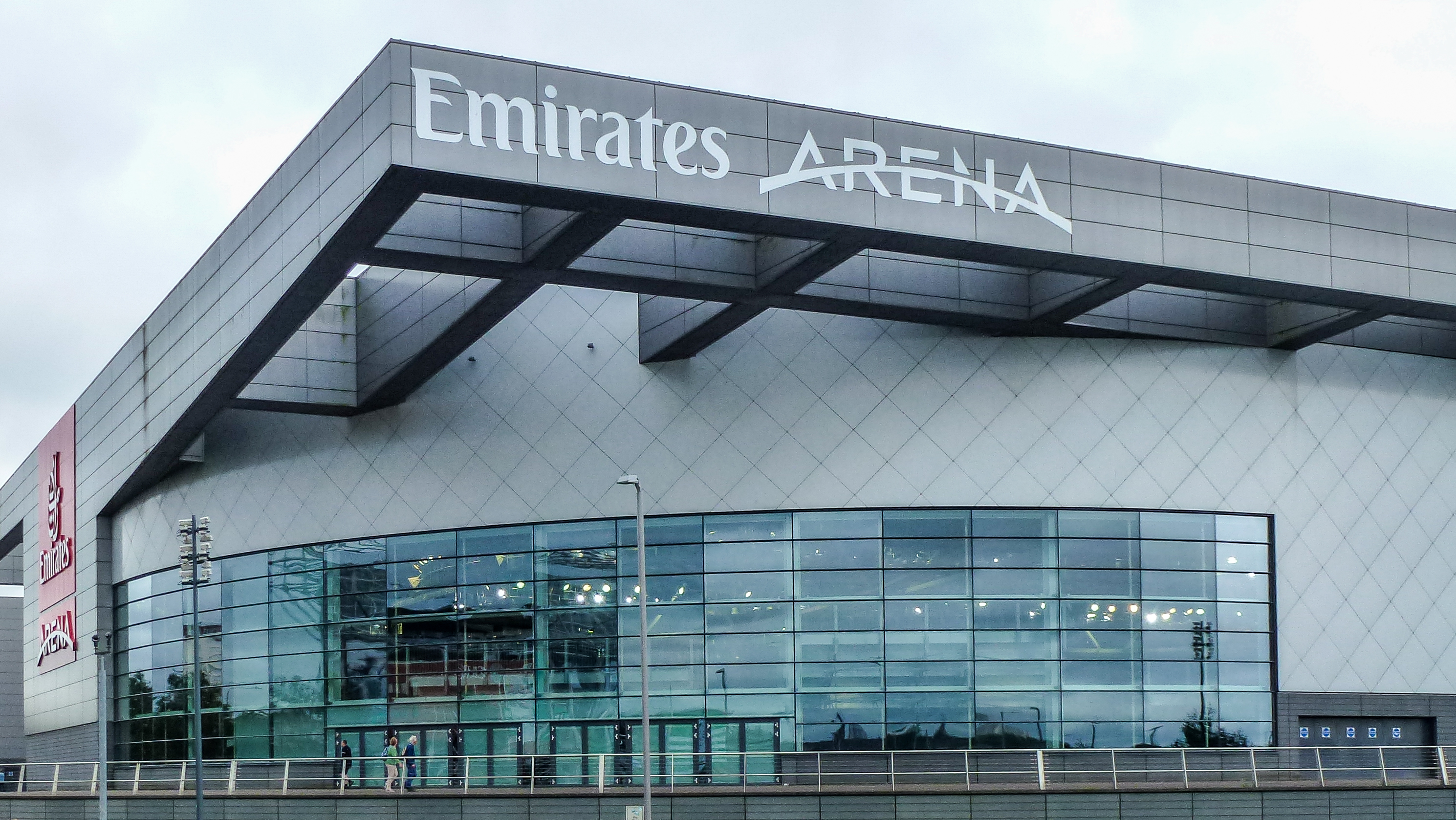
- Level: Senior
- Type: Indoor

The 2020 British Indoor Athletics Championships was the national indoor track and field competition for British athletes, held on 22 and 23 February 2020 at the Emirates Arena in Glasgow, Scotland.

== Medal summary ==
=== Men ===
Event	Gold		Silver		Bronze	
60 metres	Andrew Robertson	6.66	Sam Gordon	6.70	Toby Makowayo	6.74
200 metres	Andrew Morgan-Harrison	21.20	Nicholas Pryce	21.29	Ben Snaith	21.47
400 metres	James Williams	47.24	Joe Brier	47.92	Krishawn Aiken	48.00
800 metres	Guy Learmonth	1:46.89	Andrew Osagie	1:46.98	Piers Copeland	1:47.21
1500 metres	George Mills	3:50.69	Thomas Keen	3:52.40	Jonothan Kay	3:52.56
3000 metres	Jonathan Davies	8:07.96	Philip Sesemann	8:08.86	Michael Ward	8:10.31
5000 metres race walk	Tom Bosworth	18:20.97 NR	Tom Pattington	22:17.26	Luc Legon	23:00.52
60 metres hurdles	David King	7.78	Cameron Fillery	7.85	Ethan Akanni	7.92
High jump	Tom Gale	2.27 m	David Smith	2.24 m	Chris Baker	2.20 m
Pole vault	Adam Hague	5.55 m	Ethan Walsh	5.15 m	Andrew Murphy	5.00 m
Long jump	Dan Bramble	7.81 m	Alex Farguharson	7.77 m	Reynold Banigo	7.75 m
Triple jump	Michael Puplampu	16.21 m	Efa Uwaifo	16.18 m	Julian Reid	16.08 m
Shot put	Scott Lincoln	19.49 m	Youcef Zatat	18.61 m	Patrick Swan	16.49 m

=== Women ===
Event	Gold		Silver		Bronze	
60 metres	Amy Hunt	7.39	Alisha Rees	7.49	Ebony Carr	7.55
200 metres	Ama Pipi	23.23	Jazmine Moss	24.17	Rebecca Jeggo	24.33
400 metres	Jessie Knight	52.76	Holly Turner	54.22	Krystal Galley	54.83
800 metres	Keely Hodgkinson	2:04.37	Mari Smith	2:04.72	Philippa Millage	2:07.27
1500 metres	Holly Archer	4:21.99	Jenny Selman	4:22.57	Jacqueline Fairchild	4:22.58
3000 metres	Melissa Courtney-Bryant	9:48.54	Verity Ockenden	9:50.39	Rosie Clarke	9:52.02
5000 metres race walk	Abigail Jennings	25:28.46	Pagen Spooner	27:42.05	Not awarded	
60 metres hurdles	Yasmin Miller	8.29	Jessica Hunter	8.31	Marcia Sey	8.34
High jump	Bethan Partridge	1.87 m	Morgan Lake	1.84 m	Nikki Manson	1.84 m
Pole vault	Sophie Cook	4.50	Natalie Hooper	4.00 m	Courtney Macguire	4.00 m
Long jump	Abigail Irozuru	6.60 m	Jazmin Sawyers	6.44 m	Sarah Abrams	6.40 m
Triple jump	Naomi Ogbeta	13.83 m	Shanara Hibbert	13.03 m	Eavion Richardson	12.73 m
Shot put	Amelia Strickler	17.97 m	Sophie McKinna	17.39 m	Adele Nicoll	16.19 m
