= 2010 British Athletics Championships =

- Dates: 25–27 June
- Host city: Birmingham, England
- Venue: Alexander Stadium
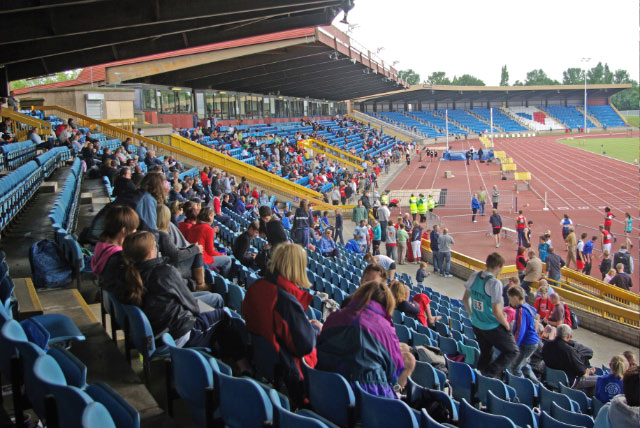
- Level: Senior
- Type: Outdoor

The 2010 British Athletics Championships was the national championship in outdoor track and field for athletes in the United Kingdom, held from 25–27 June at Alexander Stadium in Birmingham. It was organised by UK Athletics. It served as a selection meeting for Great Britain at the 2010 European Athletics Championships.

The best British performer in the men's 10,000 m race was James Walsh, who was sixth in 29:04.62 minutes. Men's long jump winner Chris Tomlinson also had a wind-legal jump of 8.04 m.

== Results ==
=== Men ===
Event	Gold		Silver		Bronze	
100m (Wind: -0.6 m/s)	Dwain Chambers	10.14	James Dasaolu	10.23	Marlon Devonish	10.34
200m (Wind: -0.8 m/s)	Christian Malcolm	20.77	Marlon Devonish	20.85	Jeffrey Lawal-Balogun	20.89
400m	Martyn Rooney	44.99	Michael Bingham	45.67	Conrad Williams	45.76
800m	Michael Rimmer	1:47.22	(Wales) Gareth Warburton	1:48.31	Darren St. Clair	1:48.50
1,500m	Andy Baddeley	3:41.49	Colin McCourt	3:41.95	Nick McCormick	3:42.52
5,000m	Chris Thompson	13:48.15	Andy Vernon	14:01.14	Ryan McLeod	14:12.03
10,000 metres	(Uganda) Stephen Kiprotich	27:58.03	(Romania) Marius Ionescu	28:54.83	(Finland) Jussi Utriainen	28:56.22
110m hurdles (Wind: -0.4 m/s)	William Sharman	13.45	Andy Turner	13.48	Lawrence Clarke	13.75
400m hurdles	(Wales) Dai Greene	48.77	(Wales) Rhys Williams	49.76	Richard Yates	50.07
3000m s'chase	Luke Gunn	8:37.35	Samatar Farah	8:52.42	Tom Wade	8:53.75
5000m walk	Alex Wright	20:11.09	Tom Bosworth	20:50.01	Luke Finch	21:29.89
high jump	Martyn Bernard	2.28 m	Tom Parsons	2.28 m	Robbie Grabarz	2.25 m
pole vault	Joe Ive	5.35 m	Max Eaves	5.35 m	Luke Cutts	5.20 m
long jump	Chris Tomlinson	8.17 m w (+2.7 m/s)	JJ Jegede	7.84 m (+1.9 m/s)	Matthew Burton	7.80 m w (+2.5 m/s)
triple jump	Phillips Idowu	17.12 m (+1.6 m/s)	Nathan Douglas	17.03 m (+1.9 m/s)	Nathan Fox	15.39 m (+0.3 m/s)
shot put	Carl Myerscough	19.77 m	Scott Rider	18.44 m	Leslie Richards	17.21 m
discus throw	(Wales) Brett Morse	61.45 m	Carl Myerscough	59.06 m	Chris Scott	57.12 m
hammer throw	Alex Smith	70.68 m	Mike Floyd	69.91 m	James Bedford	67.34 m
javelin throw	(Scotland) James Campbell	74.00 m	Brett Byrd	69.88 m	Mervyn Luckwell	68.57 m

=== Women ===
Event	Gold		Silver		Bronze	
100m (Wind: -0.4 m/s)	Laura Turner-Alleyne	11.41	Joice Maduaka	11.42	(Republic of Ireland) Elaine O'Neill	11.52
200m (Wind: -2.5 m/s)	Laura Turner-Alleyne	23.66	(Republic of Ireland) Elaine O'Neill	23.83	Katherine Endacott	23.88
400m	(Scotland) Lee McConnell	51.55	Nicola Sanders	52.70	Nadine Okyere	53.07
800m	Jemma Simpson	2:01.50	Vicky Griffiths	2:02.37	Marilyn Okoro	2:02.44
1,500m	Hannah England	4:33.23	Celia Taylor	4:33.81	Lisa Dobriskey	4:34.29
5,000m	(Scotland) Freya Ross	15:48.75	(Scotland) Laura Whittle	15:54.57	Justina Heslop	16:23.24
10,000m	Jo Pavey	31:51.91	Lara Tamsett	33:10.72	Claire Hallissey	33:24.15
100m hurdles (Wind: -2.1 m/s)	Louise Hazel	13.32	Angelita Broadbelt-Blake	13.38	Gemma Bennett	13.42
400m hurdles	Meghan Beesley	57.63	Caryl Granville	58.36	Hannah Douglas	58.49
3000m s'chase	Barbara Parker	9:37.77	Hatti Archer	9:40.69	Tina Brown	10:00.11
5000m walk	Johanna Jackson	21:52.95	Lisa Kehler	24:21.92	Fiona Oakes	26:08.99
high jump	Stephanie Pywell	1.84 m	Kay Humberstone	1.76 m	Bethan Partridge	1.71 m
pole vault	Kate Dennison	4.45 m	Holly Bradshaw	4.35 m	Henrietta Paxton	4.35 m
long jump	Jade Johnson	6.48 m w (+2.9 m/s)	Amy Harris	6.39 m (+1.3 m/s)	Abigail Irozuru	6.37 m (+0.7 m/s)
triple jump	Laura Samuel	13.52 m (+0.8 m/s)	Nadia Williams	13.49 m (+0.0 m/s)	Zainab Ceesay	12.74 m (+1.7 m/s)
shot put	Eden Francis	16.02 m	Eleanor Gatrell	15.82 m	(Scotland) Alison Rodger	15.25 m
discus throw	Jade Lally	57.81 m	(Wales) Philippa Roles	57.27 m	Eden Francis	50.47 m
hammer throw	Zoe Derham	66.11 m	Sophie Hitchon	65.03 m	Laura Douglas	61.91 m
javelin throw	Goldie Sayers	58.60 m	Laura Whittingham	55.29 m	Katy Temple	51.69 m
