= List of British champions in javelin throw =

The British javelin champions covers three competitions; the current British Athletics Championships which was founded in 2007, the preceding AAA Championships (1914-2006) and the UK Athletics Championships which existed from 1977 until 1997 and ran concurrently with the AAA Championships.

Where an international athlete won the AAA Championships the highest ranking UK athlete is considered the National Champion in this list.

== Past winners ==
AAA Championships men's event only
Year	Men's champion
1914	C. A. Mack
1920	Vic D'Arcy
1921	NBA
1922	James Dalrymple

AAA Championships & WAAA Championships
Year	Men's champion	Year	Women's champion
1923	James Dalrymple	1923	Sophie Eliott-Lynn
1924	James Dalrymple	1924	Sophie Eliott-Lynn
1925	James Dalrymple	1925	Ivy Wilson
1926	James Dalrymple	1926	Louise Fawcett
1927	NBA	1927	E. Willis
1928	Reginald Eyles	1928	Mary Weston
1929	James Dalrymple	1929	Mary Weston
1930	Robert Turner	1930	Nellie Purvey
1931	Stanley Wilson	1931	Louise Fawcett
1932	Stanley Wilson	1932	Edith Halstead
1933	William Abell	1933	Edith Halstead
1934	Charles Bowen	1934	Edith Halstead
1935	Stanley Wilson	1935	Gladys Lunn
1936	Stanley Wilson	1936	Katharine Connal
1937	Stanley Wilson	1937	Gladys Lunn
1938	Stanley Wilson	1938	Katharine Connal
1939	James McKillop	1939	Katharine Connal
1945	nc	1945	Gladys Clarke
1946	Malcolm Dalrymple	1946	Dora Endruweit
1947	NBA	1947	Dora Chandler (Endruweit)
1948	Malcolm Dalrymple	1948	Bevis Reid
1949	Antony Francis Hignell	1949	Ellen Allen
1950	Michael Denley	1950	Diane Coates
1951	Michael Denley	1951	Diane Coates
1952	Michael Denley	1952	Diane Coates
1953	Michael Denley	1953	Anne Collins
1954	Maurice Morrell	1954	Ann Dukes
1955	Dennis Tucker	1955	Diane Coates
1956	Peter Cullen	1956	Doris Orphall
1957	Peter Cullen	1957	Averil Williams
1958	Colin Smith	1958	Averil Williams
1959	Colin Smith	1959	Sue Platt
1960	Roger Lane	1960	Sue Platt
1961	John Greasley	1961	Sue Platt
1962	John McSorley	1962	Sue Platt
1963	Colin Smith	1963	Rosemary Morgan
1964	John FitzSimons	1964	Sue Platt
1965	Dave Travis	1965	Averil Williams
1966	John FitzSimons	1966	Sue Platt
1967	Barry Sanderson	1967	Sue Platt
1968	David Travis	1968	Sue Platt
1969	David Travis	1969	Sue Platt
1970	David Travis	1970	Angela King
1971	David Travis	1971	Janet Baker
1972	David Travis	1972	Prudence French
1973	David Travis	1973	Sharon Corbett
1974	David Travis	1974	Sharon Corbett
1975	David Travis	1975	Tessa Sanderson
1976	David Ottley	1976	Tessa Sanderson

AAA Championships/WAAA Championships & UK Athletics Championships dual championships era 1977-1987
Year	AAA Men	Year	WAAA Women	Year	UK Men	UK Women
1977	David Ottley	1977	Tessa Sanderson	1977	Peter De Kremer	David Ottley
1978	Peter Yates	1978	Anne Farquhar	1978	David Ottley	Tessa Sanderson
1979	Simon Osborne	1979	Tessa Sanderson	1979	David Ottley	Jacqueline Zaslona
1980	David Ottley	1980	Tessa Sanderson	1980	David Ottley	Diane Royle
1981	David Ottley	1981	Fatima Whitbread	1981	David Ottley	Fatima Whitbread
1982	David Ottley	1982	Fatima Whitbread	1982	David Ottley	Fatima Whitbread
1983	David Ottley	1983	Fatima Whitbread	1983	Peter Yates	Fatima Whitbread
1984	David Ottley	1984	Fatima Whitbread	1984	Peter Yates+	Fatima Whitbread
1985	David Ottley	1985	Tessa Sanderson	1985	Mick Hill	Fatima Whitbread
1986	David Ottley	1986	Fatima Whitbread	1986	Mick Hill	Fatima Whitbread
1987	Mick Hill	1987	Fatima Whitbread	1987	Mick Hill	Fatima Whitbread

AAA Championships & UK Athletics Championships dual championships era 1988-1997
Year	Men AAA	Women AAA	Year	Men UK	Women UK
1988	David Ottley	Sharon Gibson	1988	Steve Backley	Fatima Whitbread
1989	Steve Backley	Tessa Sanderson	1989	Steve Backley	Sharon Gibson
1990	Mick Hill	Tessa Sanderson	1990	Steve Backley	Sharon Gibson
1991	Mick Hill	Sharon Gibson	1991	Gary Jenson	Sharon Gibson
1992	Steve Backley	Tessa Sanderson	1992	Mick Hill	Mandy Liverton
1993	Colin Mackenzie	Shelley Holroyd	1993	Mick Hill	Sharon Gibson
1994	Mick Hill	Shelley Holroyd	n/a		
1995	Mick Hill	Lorna Jackson	n/a		
1996	Nick Nieland	Tessa Sanderson	n/a		
1997	Mark Roberson	Karen Martin	1997	Steve Backley	Tessa Sanderson

AAA Championships second era 1998-2006
Year	Men's champion	Women's champion
1998	Steve Backley	Lorna Jackson
1999	Steve Backley	Kirsty Morrison
2000	Steve Backley	Kelly Morgan
2001	Mark Roberson	Karen Martin
2002	Mick Hill	Kelly Morgan
2003	Mick Hill	Goldie Sayers
2004	Steve Backley	Goldie Sayers
2005	Nick Nieland	Goldie Sayers
2006	Nick Nieland	Goldie Sayers

British Athletics Championships 2007 to present
Year	Men's champion	Women's champion
2007	Nick Nieland	Goldie Sayers
2008	Michael Allen	Goldie Sayers
2009	Mervyn Luckwell	Goldie Sayers
2010	James Campbell	Goldie Sayers
2011	Lee Doran	Goldie Sayers
2012	Lee Doran	Goldie Sayers
2013	Lee Doran	Rosie Semenytsh
2014	Lee Doran	Goldie Sayers
2015	Bonne Buwembo	Izzy Jeffs
2016	Matti Mortimore	Joanna Blair
2017	Joe Dunderdale	Laura Whittingham
2018	James Whiteaker	Laura Whittingham
2019	Harry Hughes	Laura Whittingham
2020	James Whiteaker	Freya Jones
2021	Daniel Bainbridge	Bekah Walton
2022	James Whiteaker	Bekah Walton
2023	Benjamin East	Bekah Walton
2024	Joe Dunderdale	Bekah Walton
2025	Michael Allison	Bekah Walton
2026	Benjamin East	Freya Jones

- NBA = No British athlete in medal placings
- nc = not contested
