= Zoey Clark =

British sprinter

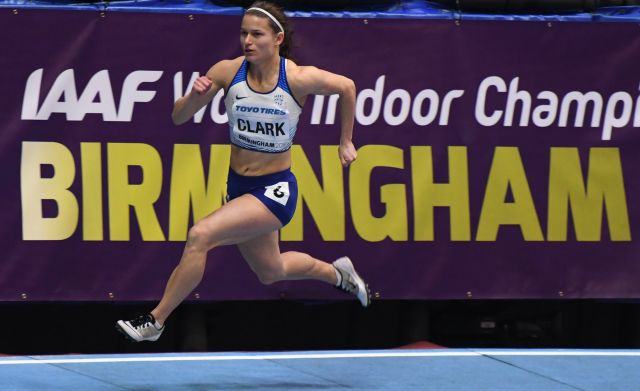
- Zoey Clark in 2018

Personal information
- Nationality: British
- Born: 25 October 1994 (age 31) Aberdeen, Scotland
- Height: 1.65 m (5 ft 5 in)
- Weight: 60 kg (132 lb)

Sport
- Country: Great Britain; Scotland
- Sport: Women's athletics
- Event: 400 metres
Medal record
Representing Scotland
Commonwealth Games
Bronze medal – third place	2022 Birmingham	4x400 m
Representing Great Britain
World Championships
Silver medal – second place	2017 London	4×400 m
World Indoor Championships
Bronze medal – third place	2018 Birmingham	4×400 m
European Championships
Bronze medal – third place	2018 Berlin	4×400 m
Bronze medal – third place	2022 Munich	4x400 m
European Indoor Championships
Silver medal – second place	2019 Glasgow	4×400 m
Silver medal – second place	2021 Toruń	4×400 m

Zoey Clark (born 25 October 1994) is a British sprinter. She competed in the women's 400 metres and was part of the British 4 × 400 relay team that won the silver medal at the 2017 World Championships in Athletics. Since then she has won two international bronzes in the relay and most recently a silver in the same event at the 2019 European Athletics Indoor Championships. She was selected as part of the 4 × 400 m relay team for the Tokyo 2020 Olympic Games.

In January 2022, she struck national double gold at Glasgow's Emirates Arena, winning the 60m in 7.50secs after a battle with Leeds athlete Hilary Gode, before going on to lower her Scottish record to 23.36sec with her win in the 200m. That was an improvement on the 23.58 she ran at the same venue four years previously. Clark has a degree in chemical engineering from the University of Aberdeen.

== Athletics achievements ==
=== Personal bests ===
Type	Distance	Time (s)	Wind (m/s)	Venue	Date	Notes
Individual events
Indoor	60 metres	7.42	—N/a	Glasgow, United Kingdom	26 January 2019	
Indoor	200 metres sh	23.36	—N/a	Glasgow, United Kingdom	22 January 2022	
Indoor	300 metres sh	39.81	—N/a	Glasgow, United Kingdom	5 March 2011	
Indoor	400 metres sh	52.03	—N/a	Glasgow, United Kingdom	6 February 2021	
Outdoor	100 metres	11.54	-0.6	Bromley, United Kingdom	16 July 2017	
Outdoor	200 metres	23.36	0.0	Bromley, United Kingdom	16 July 2017	
Outdoor	300 metres	39.44	—N/a	Inverness, United Kingdom	5 September 2010	
Outdoor	400 metres	51.22	—N/a	Geneva, Switzerland	11 June 2022	
Team events
Indoor	4x400 metres relay sh	3:28.20	—N/a	Toruń, Poland	7 March 2021	
Outdoor	4x400 metres relay	3:23.02	—N/a	Doha, Qatar	6 October 2019	
Outdoor	4 × 400 metres relay Mx	3:11.95	—N/a	Tokyo, Japan	30 July 2021	

=== International competitions ===
Representing Great Britain & Scotland
Year	Competition	Venue	Position	Event	Time
2011	2011 European Junior Championships	Tallinn, Estonia	1st	4 × 400 m relay	3:35.29
2011	Commonwealth Youth Games	Douglas, Isle of Man	4th	400 m	57.41
2014	Commonwealth Games	Glasgow, United Kingdom	9th (h)	4 × 400 m relay	3:33.91
2015	European U23 Championships	Tallinn, Estonia	1st	4 × 400 m relay	3:30.07
2017	World Championships	London, United Kingdom	16th (sf)	400 m	51.81
2017	World Championships	London, United Kingdom	2nd	4 × 400 m relay	3:25.00
2018	World Indoor Championships	Birmingham, United Kingdom	6th	400 m	52.16
2018	World Indoor Championships	Birmingham, United Kingdom	3rd	4 × 400 m relay	3:29.38
2018	Commonwealth Games	Gold Coast, Australia	10th (sf)	400 m	52.06
2018	Commonwealth Games	Gold Coast, Australia	6th	4 × 400 m relay	3:29.18
2018	World Cup	London, United Kingdom	5th	4 × 400 m relay	3:26.48
2018	European Championships	Berlin, Germany	3rd	4 × 400 m relay	3:27.40
2019	European Indoor Championships	Glasgow, United Kingdom	30th (h)	400 m	53.85
2019	European Indoor Championships	Glasgow, United Kingdom	2nd	4 × 400 m relay	3:29.55
2019	World Relays	Yokohama, Japan	6th	4 × 400 m relay	3:28.96
2019	European Team Championships Super League	Bydgoszcz, Poland	2nd	4 × 400 m relay	3:27.12
2019	World Championships	Doha, Qatar	4th	4 × 400 m relay Mx	3:12.27
2019	World Championships	Doha, Qatar	4th	4 × 400 m relay	3:23.02
2021	European Indoor Championships	Toruń, Poland	2nd	4 × 400 m relay	3:28.20
2021	World Relays	Chorzów, Poland	3rd	4 × 400 m relay	3:29.27
2021	World Relays	Chorzów, Poland	5th	4 × 400 m relay Mx	3:18.87
2021	Olympic Games	Tokyo, Japan	6th	4 × 400 m relay Mx	3:12.07
2021	Olympic Games	Tokyo, Japan	5th	4 × 400 m relay	3:22.59
2022	World Championships	Eugene, United States	9th (h)	4 × 400 m relay Mx	3:14.75
2022	Commonwealth Games	Birmingham, United Kingdom	8th	400 m	51.90
2022	Commonwealth Games	Birmingham, United Kingdom	3rd	4 × 400 m relay	3:30.15
2022	European Championships	Munich, Germany	3rd	4 × 400 m relay	3:21.74

=== National championships and competitions ===
Year	Competition	Venue	Position	Event	Time
2011	Scottish Indoor Championships, U17 events	Glasgow	2nd	200 m	25.16
2011	Scottish Indoor Championships, U17 events	Glasgow	1st	300 m	39.81
2011	England Championships, U17 events	Bedford	3rd	300 m	39.76
2012	Scottish Indoor Championships, U20 events	Glasgow	2nd	200 m	25.17
2012	Scottish Championships	Glasgow	2nd	400 m	55.73
2012	Scottish Championships, U20 events	Glasgow	3rd	200 m	25.68
2012	Scottish Championships, U20 events	Glasgow	1st	400 m	55.57
2013	British Indoor Championships	Sheffield	—	400 m	56.56
2013	Scottish Indoor Championships	Glasgow	1st	60 m	7.69
2013	Scottish Indoor Championships	Glasgow	3rd	200 m	24.99
2013	British Championships	Birmingham	—	400 m	54.94
2013	Scottish Championships	Glasgow	3rd	400 m	55.48
2013	Scottish Championships, U20 events	Aberdeen	1st	200 m	24.59
2013	Scottish Championships, U20 events	Aberdeen	1st	400 m	55.55
2014	Scottish Indoor Championships	Glasgow	2nd	200 m	24.62
2014	Scottish Indoor Championships	Glasgow	2nd	60 m	7.75
2014	England Championships, U23 events	Bedford	2nd	400 m	53.51
2014	British Championships	Birmingham	—	400 m	54.59
2015	Scottish Indoor Championships	Glasgow	1st	60 m	7.58
2015	Scottish Indoor Championships	Glasgow	1st	200 m	23.96
2015	England Championships, U23 events	Bedford	2nd	400 m	53.73
2015	Scottish Championship	Aberdeen	1st	400 m	53.31
2016	British Championships	Birmingham	—	400 m	53.87
2016	Scottish Championships	Grangemouth	1st	400 m	53.67
2017	British Championships	Birmingham	1st	400 m	52.30
2018	Scottish Indoor Championships	Glasgow	1st	200 m	23.58
2018	British Indoor Championships	Birmingham	2nd	400 m	52.12
2018	British Championships	Birmingham	4th	400 m	52.13
2019	Scottish Indoor Championships	Glasgow	2nd	60 m	7.42
2019	Scottish Indoor Championships	Glasgow	1st	200 m	23.60
2019	British Indoor Championships	Birmingham	1st	400 m	52.85
2019	British Championships	Birmingham	3rd	400 m	52.52
2021	British Championships	Manchester	6th	400 m	52.00
2024	Scottish Championships	Grangemouth	1st	100 m	11.68
2024	Scottish Championships	Grangemouth	2nd	200 m	24.12
2024	Scottish Championships	Grangemouth	2nd	400 m	53.83
2025	British Indoor Championships	Birmingham	—	60 m	7.64
2025	British Indoor Championships	Birmingham	—	200 m	24.21
