= Jacob Paul =

British hurdler

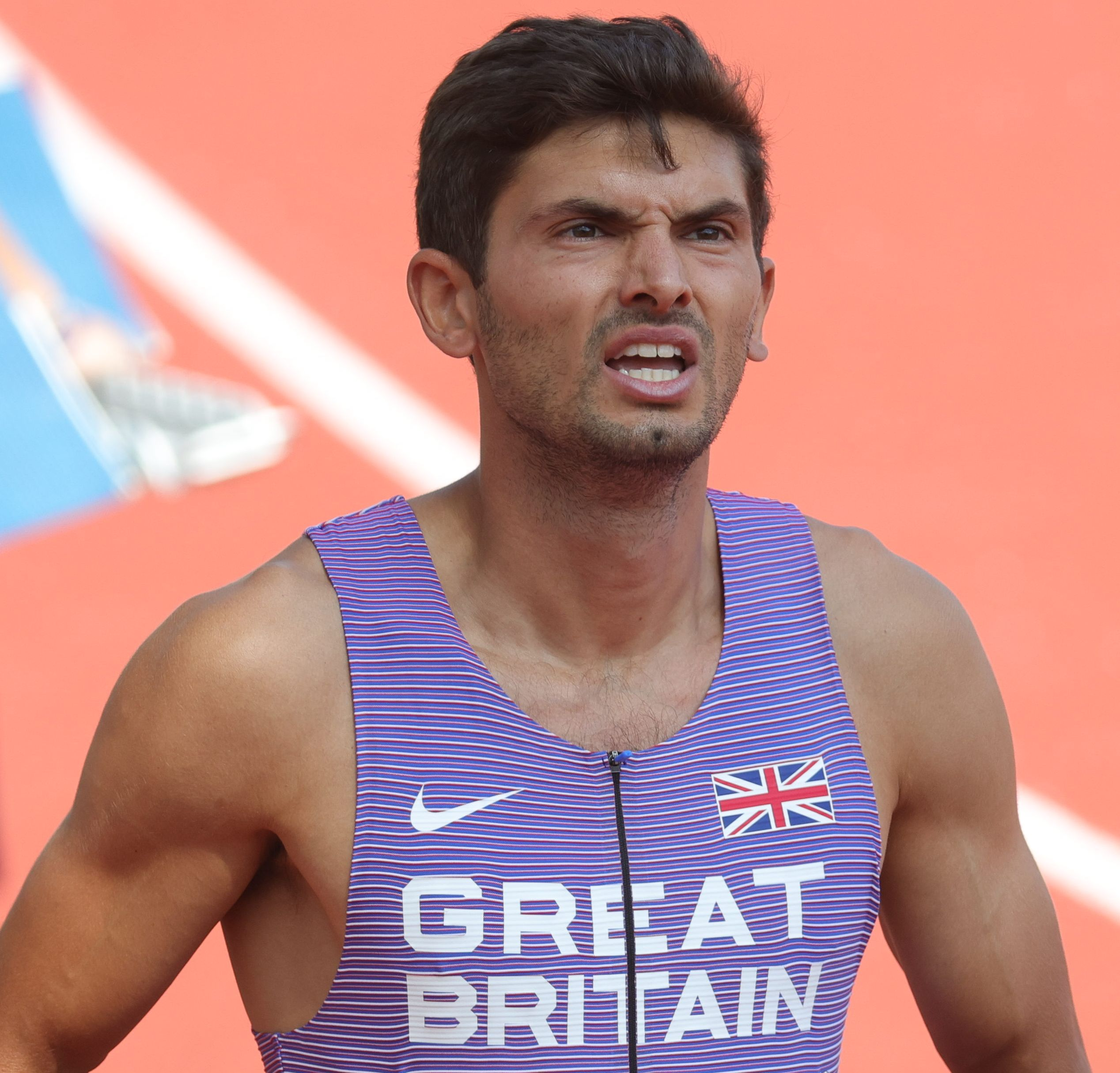
- Jacob Paul during ECh in 2022

Personal information
- Born: 6 February 1995 (age 31) Banstead, Surrey, England
- Education: University of Bath

Sport
- Sport: Hurdling
- Club: TeamBath

Achievements and titles
- National finals: 2019
- Commonwealth finals: 2018
Medal record
Representing Great Britain
British Athletics Championships
Silver medal – second place	2017 Birmingham	400 metre hurdles
Gold medal – first place	2019 Birmingham	400 metre hurdles
Bronze medal – third place	2021 Manchester	400 metre hurdles

Jacob Paul (born 6 February 1995) is a British hurdler who won the 400 metres hurdles event at the 2019 British Athletics Championships. He competed for England at the 2018 Commonwealth Games in Gold Coast, Australia.

== Personal life ==
Paul is from Banstead, Surrey. He studied at the University of Bath, and graduated in 2016.

== Career ==
In the 2010 season, he led the under-17 decathlon rankings, before choosing to switch to hurdling. He competed at the 2011 Commonwealth Youth Games on the Isle of Man, finishing fourth, and also the 2011 European Youth Summer Olympic Festival. at the 2013 European Athletics Junior Championships, Paul came third in the 400m hurdles event. He competed at the 2017 Summer Universiade, finishing third in his semi-final and missing out on the final by one place. In 2017, Paul came second in the British Championships, in a personal best time of 49.49, which was the first time he had run under 50 seconds. In the same year, he came fifth in the European U-23 Championships.

Paul received a late call up to the 2018 Commonwealth Games in Gold Coast, Australia after long jumper Greg Rutherford withdrew from the Games. The Games were Paul's first major senior championship. In 2019, Paul won the 400 metres hurdles event at the British Athletics Championships. In 2021, Paul won the 400 metres hurdles event at the National Athletics League, and came third in the event at the 2021 British Athletics Championships. He was not selected for the delayed 2020 Summer Olympics. At the 2022 European Athletics Championships, Paul was eliminated in the semi-finals of the 400 metres hurdles event, after finishing fifth in his semi-final. He set personal best times in both the heats and semi-finals.
