= Freya Jones =

English javelin thrower (born 1993)

Personal information
- Nationality: British (English)
- Born: 13 November 1993 (age 32)

Sport
- Sport: Athletics
- Event: Javelin throw
- Club: Southampton Athletic Club
- Coached by: David Callaway

Freya Jones (born 13 November 1993) is an English track and field athlete specialising in the javelin throw.

== Biography ==
Competing for the Georgia Bulldogs women's track and field team, Jones won the 2013 javelin throw at the NCAA Division I Outdoor Track and Field Championships.

She became British champion when winning the javelin throw event at the 2020 British Athletics Championships with a throw of 53.12 metres.

Jones has finished runner-up to Bekah Walton four times at the British Championships in 2021, 2023, 2024 and 2025. Finally, in 2026, she won her second British title.
