= Angela King (javelin thrower) =

British athlete

Personal information
- Nationality: British (English)
- Born: 21 October 1951

Sport
- Sport: Athletics
- Event: Javelin throw
- Club: Small Heath Harriers

Angela Hilary King (born 21 October 1951) is a former international athlete who competed at the Commonwealth Games.

== Biography ==
King was a member of the Small Heath Harriers and specialised in the javelin throw.

In June 1970, King became the British javelin throw champion by virtue of being the highest placed British athlete at the 1970 WAAA Championships, finishing runner-up behind Ameli Koloska of West Germany.

King represented the England team at the 1970 British Commonwealth Games in Edinburgh, Scotland, where she competed in the 100 metres hurdles event, finishing just outside the medal rostrum in fourth place.

King studied at the University of Sheffield and set a university record of 44.92 metres at the 1971 British Universities Sports Federation Championships. In 1972 she finished runner-up behind Pru French at the 1972 WAAA Championships.
