= Ogbeta =

Ogbeta is a surname. Notable people with the surname include:

- Naomi Ogbeta (born 1998), British triple jumper
- Nathanael Ogbeta (born 2001), English footballer
