= 1951 AAA Championships =

Outdoor track and field competition

- Dates: 13–14 July 1951
- Host city: London, England
- Venue: White City Stadium
- Level: Senior
- Type: Outdoor

The 1951 AAA Championships was the 1951 edition of the annual outdoor track and field competition organised by the Amateur Athletic Association (AAA). It was held from 13 to 14 July 1951 at White City Stadium in London, England.

== Summary ==
The Championships covered two days of competition. The marathon was held in Birmingham and the decathlon event was held in Cannock.

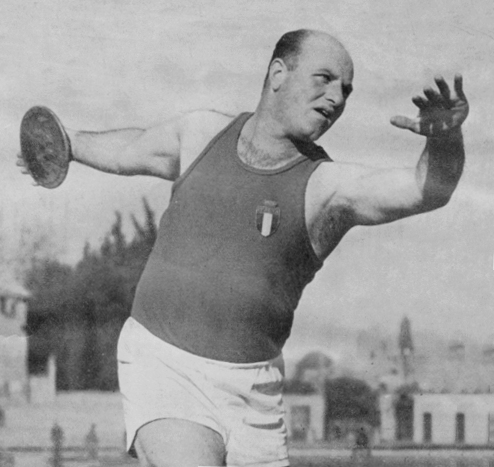
Giuseppe Tosi

== Results ==
Event	Gold		Silver		Bronze	
100 yards	McDonald Bailey	9.6 =NR	Brian Shenton	9.8	George Ellis	10.0
220 yards	McDonald Bailey	21.4	Nick Stacey	21.9	George Ellis	22.0
440 yards	Derek Pugh	47.9	Terry Higgins	48.6	Leslie Lewis	48.8
880 yards	Arthur Wint	1:49.6	Frank Evans	1:53.2	Tom White	1:53.5
1 mile	Roger Bannister	4:07.8	Bill Nankeville	4:08.6	John Parlett	4:09.2
3 miles	Roy Beckett	14:02.6	Chris Chataway	14:02.6	Harry Hicks	14:10.0
6 miles	Gordon Pirie	29:32.0 NR	Walter Hesketh	29.50.0	Bill Gray	30:12.4
marathon	Jim Peters	2:31:42.6	(Wales) Tom Richards	2:37:02	Jack Winfield	2:41:42
steeplechase	(Socialist Federal Republic of Yugoslavia) Petar Šegedin	9:58.6	(Wales) John Disley	10:04.0 NR	Rene Howell	10:25.0
120y hurdles	Jack Parker	14.8	Peter Hildreth	14.9	(Iceland) Örn Clausen	15.0
440y hurdles	Harry Whittle	54.2	Angus Scott	54.7	Jack Parker	55.2
2 miles walk	Roland Hardy	13:43.2	Gerald Gregory	14:00.8	George Coleman	14:15.6
7 miles walk	Roland Hardy	51:14.6	Lol Allen	2:54.4	Harry Churcher	54:04.0
high jump	Ron Pavitt	1.956	(Belgium) Jacques Delelienne	1.930	(Belgium) Walter Herssens	1.930
pole vault	(Iceland) Torfi Bryngeirsson	4.04	(Italy) Giulio Chiesa	3.88	(Scotland) Norman Gregor	3.81
long jump	Sylvanus Williams	7.05	Roy Cruttenden	7.03	Ian Walker	6.89
triple jump	Sidney Cross	14.32	Peter Goldsmith	14.24	(Rhodesia) Roderick Salmon	14.04
shot put	(Iceland) Gunnar Huseby	15.87	John Savidge	15.70	(Belgium) Willy Wuyts	14.50
discus throw	(Italy) Giuseppe Tosi	53.58	(Belgium) Clement Mertens	43.93	(Belgium) Raymond Kintziger	43.80
hammer throw	(Italy) Teseo Taddia	54.00	(Scotland) Duncan Clark	52.42	Peter Allday	49.70
javelin throw	(Italy) Amos Matteucci	61.08	Michael Denley	60.16	Malcolm Dalrymple	55.89
decathlon	Les Pinder	5089	Harry Whittle	5068	Alec Hardy	4474

== See also ==
- 1951 WAAA Championships
