= Matthew Hudson-Smith =

British sprinter (born 1994)

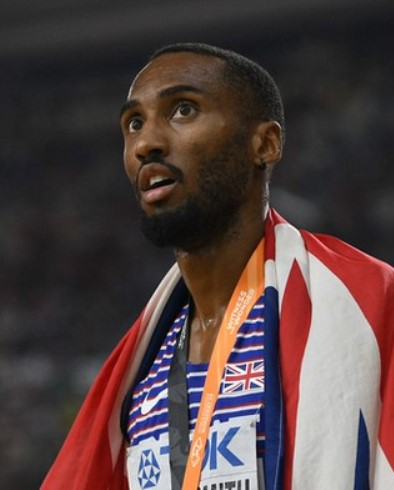
- Hudson-Smith in 2023

Personal information
- Born: 26 October 1994 (age 32) Wolverhampton, England
- Height: 1.94 m (6 ft 4 in)
- Weight: 78 kg (172 lb)

Sport
- Sport: Track and field
- Event: 400 metres
- Club: Birchfield Harriers
Medal record
Men's athletics
Representing Great Britain
Olympic Games
Silver medal – second place	2024 Paris	400 m
Bronze medal – third place	2024 Paris	4 × 400 m relay
World Championships
Silver medal – second place	2023 Budapest	400 m
Bronze medal – third place	2017 London	4 × 400 m relay
Bronze medal – third place	2022 Eugene	400 m
European Championships
Gold medal – first place	2014 Zürich	4 × 400 m relay
Gold medal – first place	2018 Berlin	400 m
Gold medal – first place	2022 Munich	400 m
Gold medal – first place	2022 Munich	4 × 400 m relay
Gold medal – first place	2026 Birmingham	400 m
Silver medal – second place	2014 Zürich	400 m
Silver medal – second place	2018 Berlin	4 × 400 m relay
Silver medal – second place	2026 Birmingham	4 × 400 m relay
Bronze medal – third place	2016 Amsterdam	4 × 400 m relay
Representing England
Commonwealth Games
Gold medal – first place	2014 Glasgow	4 × 400 m relay
Silver medal – second place	2022 Birmingham	400 m

Matthew Hudson-Smith (born 26 October 1994) is a British track and field sprinter who specialises in the 400 metres and is, as of August 2026, the fastest European and sixth fastest athlete of all-time over the distance. In September 2024 he was ranked as the number one 400 m runner in the world and has won six British titles (five in the 400 m and one in the 200 m), five Diamond League events, three individual European titles, an individual Olympic silver medal, World Championships silver and bronze individual medals and an individual Commonwealth silver medal. He has also won a number of relay titles including an Olympic bronze medal, World Championships bronze medal, two European gold medals, one European silver medal, one European bronze medal and a Commonwealth Games gold medal. Hudson-Smith also holds the European and British 4 × 400 m records (2:55.83) along with the GB Team who ran in the final of the men's 4 × 400 m event in the Paris 2024 Olympics.

He holds, as of September 2024 the British and European record, running a personal best of 43.44 seconds for the distance at the 2024 Summer Olympics. He currently holds the top 5 fastest times ever run by a European Athlete in the 400 m and is widely considered to be the greatest British and European 400 m runner in history. He is the only athlete to win three individual European Championships 400 metres titles.

== Career ==
Born in Wolverhampton, he joined a nearby athletics club, Birchfield Harriers, in 2006. He competed in a variety of events before focusing more on the sprints from 2008 onwards. In 2010 and 2011 he mainly concentrated as a 200 metres runner. He was runner-up at the English Schools Championships over that distance in both 2011 and 2012 before finally winning the title in 2013 at the age of eighteen, after returning from a series of hamstring injuries and illness. During 2012 to 2013 he studied on the AASE Apprenticeship at Loughborough College and is now a Physical Education and Sports Coaching student at the University of Worcester, allowing him to continue his education at the same time as training and competing.

That year also saw his international debut for Great Britain: he performed well at the 2013 European Athletics Junior Championships, setting a 200 m best of 20.88 seconds in the semi-finals before getting the bronze medal in a British medal sweep, behind Nethaneel Mitchell-Blake and Leon Reid. He won a second bronze as part of the British 4 × 400 metres relay team, running the second leg.

In the 2014 season, he returned to competing in the 400 m, working under his coach Tony Hadley. Coming from a personal best of 48.76 seconds at the start of the year, his new focus on the event greatly improved his times. He ran of 46.29 seconds at the Tom Jones Memorial Invitational in Florida in April, then set a best of 45.80 seconds in Belgium in May. He ran a quick race at the British Athletics Championships, but was disqualified for a lane infringement.

His following race at the Glasgow Grand Prix marked a career breakthrough as he finished in the top three at the Diamond League race in a time of 44.97 seconds. This made him only the second British teenager to dip under 45 seconds for the distance and placed him second on the European rankings for the season. Hudson-Smith surprised himself with the level of improvement, saying "I've no idea where that came from, no idea at all". He was chosen to represent England at the 2014 Commonwealth Games in the 4 × 400 m relay alongside Conrad Williams, Michael Bingham, and Daniel Awde. On his return to Glasgow for the Commonwealth Games he ran the fastest split on the final leg to overhaul Trinidad and Tobago's Zwede Hewitt and hold off Olympic champion Chris Brown, winning the gold medal for the team.

At the 2014 European Athletics Championships in Zürich, Switzerland, Hudson-Smith won the silver medal in the individual 400 m in a time of 44.75 seconds, behind compatriot Martyn Rooney. This is despite receiving a yellow card (warning) from the officials for not being stable in the set position.

In 2016, Hudson-Smith was selected for the Rio Olympics in the 400 m and the 4 × 400 m. In the 400 m, he qualified for the final with a personal best of 44.48, and finished 8th in the final with a time of 44.61. He ran in the heats of the 4 × 400 m relay, but his team were disqualified as Hudson-Smith was judged to have been outside the takeover zone when he started running to receive the baton from Delano Williams.

At the 2017 World Championships, Hudson-Smith made it to the semi-finals of the 400 m, however, did not qualify to the final as he finished fourth in his semi-final. He won bronze as part of the men's 4 × 400 m relay, with his teammates Dwayne Cowan, Rabah Yousif and Martyn Rooney

Prior to the 2018 season, he moved to Florida and started working with Coach Lance Brauman and the PureAthletics camp which also featured the likes of Noah Lyles and Shaunae Miller-Uibo. He won gold at the 2018 European Championships in the men's 400 m, winning the final with a time of 44.78, also winning silver in the men's 4 × 400 m relay.

Hudson-Smith was not able to compete at the delayed Tokyo 2020 Olympics. However, in the 2022 season Hudson-Smith switched coaching groups to partner with Gary Evans and returned to his best form breaking the British national record at the Prefontaine Classic in Eugene clocking 44.35 seconds and being signed by Puma. He went on to win bronze at the 2022 World Championships later in the year, his first individual medal at the World Championships and becoming only the second British 400 m runner to medal in the men's event. He won gold at the 2022 European Championships in both the men's 400 m and men's 4 × 400 m relay. and a silver medal in the Birmingham Commonwealth Games which took place on the track Hudson-Smith had trained on in his youth at Alexander Stadium. Also in 2022, he won the 400 m at the British Athletics Championships by 1.26 seconds which was the largest winning margin in the men's 400 metres at those championships for over 30 years.

In 2023, he won the silver medal in the men's 400 m at the 2023 World Athletics Championships, again breaking the European record in the semi-finals with a time of 44.26.

Hudson-Smith opened his 2024 season with a 200 m personal best of 20.39 in Florida. He was part of the British team for the 2024 World Athletics Relays, finishing sixth in the men's 4 × 400 m final. He broke his own European record at the Bislett Games in Oslo clocking a time of 44.07. He set a new personal best of 20.34 seconds in winning his first national 200 metres title at the 2024 British Athletics Championships on 30 June.

Hudson-Smith lowered his European 400 m record again at the Diamond League meeting in London on 20 July 2024, winning the race in a time of 43.74, improving Steven Gardiner's seven‑year‑old track record by 0.15 seconds with the fastest 400 m time ever seen on British soil.

At the 2024 Paris Olympics, Hudson-Smith won the silver medal in the 400 m event with a time of 43.44 seconds, finishing behind gold medalist Quincy Hall, who won the race in 43.40 seconds. Hall came from behind in the final 15 meters to overtake Hudson-Smith, who had been leading most of the way. Hudson-Smith's sprint is the sixth-fastest all-time, making him the fifth-fastest person in the 400 m event in history, across all competitions. This marked the first time that an athlete was not able to secure the gold medal with a time under 43.75 seconds in the Olympics. Hudson-Smith led his team through the 4 × 400 m heats to a place in the final and to a bronze medal, producing a split of 43.09 in the final which at the time was the fourth fastest 4 × 400 m relay split in history.

In October 2024, it was announced that he had signed up for the inaugural season of the Michael Johnson founded Grand Slam Track. He won the 200 metres and came second in the 400 metres at the opening event in Kingston, Jamaica, in April 2025, becoming the competition's first men's long-sprints champion and claiming a $100,000 prize.

On 12 August 2026, Hudson-Smith won the gold medal in the 400 metres at the European Championships in Birmingham. This was his third European outdoor title and seventh medal at the event making him the joint-most decorated man of all-time at the Championships.

== Personal bests ==
- 400 metres – 43.44 sec (2024) – ninth fastest time in history.
- 200 metres – 20.34 sec (2024)
- 60 metres – 6.96 sec (2012)

== National titles ==
- British Athletics Championships
  - 400 metres: (5) 2016, 2017, 2018, 2019, 2022
  - 200 metres: (1) 2024

== Circuit performances ==
Grand Slam Track results
Slam	Race group	Event	Pl.	Time	Prize money
2025 Kingston Slam	Long sprints	400 m	2nd	44.65	US$100,000
2025 Kingston Slam	Long sprints	200 m	1st	20.77	US$100,000
2025 Miami Slam	Long sprints	200 m	7th	20.64	US$20,000
2025 Miami Slam	Long sprints	400 m	3rd	44.37	US$20,000
2025 Philadelphia Slam	Long sprints	400 m	1st	44.51	US$100,000
2025 Philadelphia Slam	Long sprints	200 m	5th	20.70	US$100,000

== International competition record ==
Representing Great Britain unless otherwise stated.

Year	Competition	Venue	Position	Event	Notes
2013	European Junior Championships	Rieti, Italy	3rd	200 m	20.94
2013	European Junior Championships	Rieti, Italy	3rd	4 × 400 m relay	3:05.14
2014	Commonwealth Games representing England	Glasgow, United Kingdom	1st	4 × 400 m relay	3:00.46
2014	European Championships	Zürich, Switzerland	2nd	400 m	44.75
2014	European Championships	Zürich, Switzerland	1st	4 × 400 m relay	2:58.79
2016	European Championships	Amsterdam, Netherlands	3rd	4 × 400 m relay	3:01.44
2016	Olympic Games	Rio de Janeiro, Brazil	8th	400 m	44.61
2017	World Championships	London, United Kingdom	9th (sf)	400 m	44.74
2017	World Championships	London, United Kingdom	3rd	4 × 400 m relay	2.59.00
2018	Commonwealth Games representing England	Gold Coast, Australia	–	400 m	DQ
2018	Commonwealth Games representing England	Gold Coast, Australia	–	4 × 400 m relay	DNF
2018	European Championships	Berlin, Germany	1st	400 m	44.78
2018	European Championships	Berlin, Germany	2nd	4 × 400 m relay	3:00.36
2019	World Championships	Doha, Qatar	–	400 m	DNF
2022	World Championships	Eugene, Oregon	3rd	400 m	44.66
2022	Commonwealth Games representing England	Birmingham, England	2nd	400 m	44.81
2022	European Championships	Munich, Germany	1st	400 m	44.53
2022	European Championships	Munich, Germany	1st	4 × 400 m relay	2:59.35
2023	World Championships	Budapest, Hungary	2nd	400 m	44.31
2024	Olympic Games	Paris, France	2nd	400 m	43.44
2024	Olympic Games	Paris, France	3rd	4 × 400 m relay	2:55.83
2025	World Championships	Tokyo, Japan	18th (sf)	400 m	44.95
2026	World Ultimate Championship	Budapest, Hungary	5th	400 m	44.28

== Personal life ==
Hudson-Smith married Antonia Tyson at a ceremony in Birmingham, England, on 29 September 2024, with guests at the event including Dina Asher-Smith and Noah Lyles. He subsequently moved to live in the USA. In September 2026, Hudson-Smith served as Mayor of Wolverhampton for one day, after jokingly declaring it as his next ambition following his win at that summer's European Championships.
