= Athletics at the 1967 Summer Universiade – Men's javelin throw =

The men's javelin throw event at the 1967 Summer Universiade was held at the National Olympic Stadium in Tokyo on 4 September 1967.

== Results ==
Rank	Name	Nationality	Result	Notes
1st place, gold medalist(s)	Dave Travis	Great Britain	76.64	
2nd place, silver medalist(s)	Michel Pougheon	France	70.34	
3rd place, bronze medalist(s)	Hisao Yamamoto	Japan	67.72	
4	Yoshitane Sato	Japan	65.10	
5	Paulo de Faria	Brazil	61.26	
