= Stanley Wilson (athlete) =

English athlete (fl. 1934–1937)

Personal information
- Nationality: British (English)

Sport
- Sport: Athletics
- Event: Javelin
- Club: Birchfield Harriers

Stanley J Wilson was a male athlete who competed for England.

== Biography ==
Wilson finished third behind Olav Sunde in the javelin throw event at the 1931 AAA Championships and second behind Oto Jurģis at the 1932 AAA Championships. By virtue of being the highest placed British athlete he was deemed the British champion.

After finishing second behind Charles Bowen in the javelin event at the 1934 AAA Championships Wilson competed for England in the javelin at the 1934 British Empire Games in London. Wilson was an early pioneer of the javelin in Britain, represented Birchfield Harriers

Wilson was once again classed as British champion (as the highest placed Briton) at the 1935 AAA Championships and 1936 AAA Championships before he won the competition outright at the 1937 AAA Championships.

Wilson missed the 1938 British Empire Games due to the cost of sending a team to Australia but did complete a second place finish at the 1938 AAA Championships.

He was a student and then a lecturer at Carnegie College of Physical Education, in Leeds and became a notable coach. He was also a gym teacher at West Leeds High School for many years.

== Publications ==
Wilson wrote two books -

- New Approach to Athletics (1939)
- Vaulting And Agility (1947)
