= Jock Dalrymple =

British javelin thrower

Personal information
- Nationality: British (Scottish)
- Born: 3 February 1892 Burntisland, Scotland
- Died: 14 May 1960 (aged 68) Bedford, England
- Height: 165 cm (5 ft 5 in)
- Weight: 66 kg (146 lb)

Sport
- Sport: Athletics
- Event: Javelin throw
- Club: Birchfield Harriers

James Dalrymple also known as Jock Dalrymple (3 February 1892 – 14 May 1960) was a British athlete who competed at the 1924 Summer Olympics.

== Biography ==
Dalrymple became the national javelin champion after winning the British AAA Championships title at the 1923 AAA Championships. He had been considered the British champion in 1922 by virtue of being the highest placed British athlete at the 1922 AAA Championships.

In June 1924, he successfully retained his javelin title at the 1924 AAA Championships and less than one month later represented Great Britain at the Paris Olympics.

At the 1924 Olympic Games, Dalrymple competed in the men's javelin throw, where he was eliminated in qualifying. Dalrymple was once again the best placed British athlete at both the 1925 AAA Championships and the 1925 AAA Championships.

He set a British record of 56.42 metres in 1929 and his son Malcolm Dalrymple also set a British record of 64.25 metres in 1948, and competed at the 1948 Summer Olympics.
