= Malcolm Dalrymple =

British javelin thrower

Personal information
- Nationality: British (English)
- Born: 2 December 1922 Bedford, England
- Died: 17 November 2008 (aged 85) Bedford, England

Sport
- Sport: Athletics
- Event: Javelin throw
- Club: L.A.C.

Malcolm James William Dalrymple (2 December 1922 – 17 November 2008) was a British athlete who competed at the 1948 Summer Olympics.

== Biography ==
Dalrymple was the son of Jock Dalrymple, a javelin thrower who set a British record of 56.42 metres in 1929, and competed at the 1924 Summer Olympics. Malcolm Dalrymple first came to prominence when winning the 1939 AAA Junior title before having his career interrupted by World War II.

After the war, Dalrymple finished second behind Nico Lutkeveld in the javelin throw event at the 1946 AAA Championships. In 1948, Dalrymple, now an engineer by profession, emulated his father by setting a British record of 64.25 metres.

Dalrymple was beaten by Latvian Jan Stendzenieks to the 1948 AAA title before he represented the Great Britain team at the 1948 Olympic Games in London in the men's javelin throw competition.

Dalrymple was runner-up yet again at both the 1949 AAA Championships and 1950 AAA Championships behind Antony Hignell and Michael Denley respectively. However because he was the best placed British athlete in 1946 and 1948 he was considered the British javelin champion for those years.
