= Harry Hicks (athlete) =

British long-distance runner (1925–2012)

Personal information
- Nationality: British (English)
- Born: 6 August 1925 Barnet, London
- Died: 25 April 2012 (aged 86) Finchley, London

Sport
- Sport: Long-distance running
- Event: Marathon
- Club: Hampstead AC

Henry John Hicks (6 August 1925 – 25 April 2012) was a British long-distance runner and administrator for the Southern Cross Country Association (SEEA). He competed at the 1956 Summer Olympics.

== Biography ==
Hicks ran for England in the 1949 and 1950 International CC Championship. He finished third behind Roy Beckett in the 3 miles event at the 1951 AAA Championships.

Hicks won the marathon at the 1956 AAA Championships. Hicks represented Great Britain at the 1956 Olympic Games in Melbourne, where he participated in the marathon. After qualifying for the 1956 Melbourne Olympics he finished 15th. After retiring as an athlete he became the Southern Cross Country Association until the late 1980s. He was ECCA President in 1993. He died from pancreatic cancer on 25 April 2012.
