= Naomi Metzger =

British triple jumper

Personal information
- Nationality: British
- Born: Naomi Ogbeta; 18 April 1998 (age 28) Salford, England

Sport
- Sport: Athletics
- Event: Triple jump
- Club: Trafford AC
- Coached by: Aston Moore

Achievements and titles
- National finals: 10-time British champion
- Highest world ranking: 12th
- Personal best: 14.37 m (2022)
Medal record
Representing Great Britain
Women's athletics
European U20 Championships
Bronze medal – third place	2017 Grosseto	Triple jump
Representing England
Commonwealth Games
Bronze medal – third place	2022 Birmingham	Triple jump

Naomi Metzger (née Ogbeta) (born 18 April 1998) is a British track and field athlete who competes in the triple jump. She holds a personal best of 14.37 m (set in 2022) and is a ten-time British champion (6 outdoors, 4 indoors). She represented Great Britain in the triple jump at the 2018 and 2022 European Athletics Championships, the 2019 European Athletics Indoor Championships and the 2022 World Athletics Championships. She also represented England in the triple jump at the 2022 Commonwealth Games, winning a bronze medal in a new personal best of 14.37m.

== Career ==
Ogbeta began taking part in athletics at the age of 13, signing up with Salford Metropolitan Athletics Club. She won two Greater Manchester schools titles over 200 metres in 2012 and 2013. She joined Trafford AC in Manchester in 2014 and, after a switch to the triple jump, she won the English Schools' Athletics Championships. Having won her first English under-20 title, she made her international debut at the 2015 World Youth Championships in Athletics and narrowly missed out on the final, jumping the same distance of 12.75 m as qualifier Yelena Drozhilina. In 2016 she was the English Under-20 Champion both indoors and out. Ogbeta won a third under-20 English title in 2017 and was indoor and outdoor champion at the British University Championships. Her career reached new heights with a win at the 2017 British Athletics Championships and a bronze medal at the 2017 European Athletics U20 Championships.

Ogbeta began 2018 with a runner-up finish at the 2018 British Indoor Athletics Championships, then wins at the BUCS Championships and the England U23 Championships. She repeated as national champion at the 2018 British Athletics Championships, gained selection for the British team at the Athletics World Cup, where she was sixth, and the 2018 European Athletics Championships, where she was twelfth in her first major final having set a personal best of 14.15 m in qualifying. She won at the 2019 British Indoor Athletics Championships with 14.05 m – her first clearance over fourteen metres indoors. She was 2 centimetres off qualifying for the final at the 2019 European Athletics Indoor Championships, taking ninth place. She won the English U23 title and a third straight British title at the 2019 British Athletics Championships. She placed fourth at the 2019 European Athletics U23 Championships and seventh at the 2019 European Team Championships Super League that summer. She was invited to compete at the 2019 World Athletics Championships based on her IAAF world ranking, but was not selected for the team by British Athletics. Instead she attended the championships in a media capacity, providing an athlete perspective in the BBC's television coverage.

In 2021, shortly before her marriage, she became British champion for the fifth successive year when winning the triple jump event at the 2021 British Athletics Championships with a jump of 14.04 metres. The following year under her married name of Metzger, she won a sixth title at the 2022 British Athletics Championships and followed this up two years later with a seventh at the 2024 British Athletics Championships.

== Personal life ==
She lives in Salford. Her brother, Nathanael Ogbeta, is a footballer. She attended the University of Manchester, studying politics and quantitative methods, and was a member of the comedy society there. She was a member of the Salford Youth Council and has appeared on BBC News television and radio, discussing Brexit. She is of Nigerian and Jamaican heritage.

== International competitions ==
Year	Competition	Venue	Position	Event	Notes
2015	World Youth Championships	Cali, Colombia	13th (q)	Triple jump	12.75 m w
2017	European U20 Championships	Grosseto, Italy	3rd	Triple jump	13.68 m w
2018	European Championships	Berlin, Germany	12th	Triple jump	13.94 m
2019	European Indoor Championships	Glasgow, United Kingdom	9th (q)	Triple jump	13.80 m
2019	European U23 Championships	Gävle, Sweden	4th	Triple jump	13.64 m
2019	European Team Championships	Bydgoszcz, Poland	7th	Triple jump	13.90 m
2022	World Championships	Eugene, United States	18th (q)	Triple jump	13.97 m
2022	European Championships	Munich, Germany	6th	Triple jump	14.33 m

== National titles ==
- British Athletics Championships
  - Triple jump: 2017, 2018, 2019
- British Indoor Athletics Championships
  - Triple jump: 2018, 2019, 2020
