= Bekah Walton =

British athlete (born 1999)

Personal information
- Nationality: British
- Born: 20 September 1999 (age 26)

Sport
- Sport: Athletics
- Event: Javelin
- Club: Blackheath and Bromley Harriers AC

Achievements and titles
- Personal best(s): Javelin: 59.95m (Huevla, 2024)
Medal record
Women's athletics
Representing Great Britain
European Games
Bronze medal – third place	2023 Chorzów	Javelin
British Athletics Championships
Gold medal – first place	2021 Manchester	Javelin
Gold medal – first place	2022 Manchester	Javelin
Gold medal – first place	2023 Manchester	Javelin
Gold medal – first place	2024 Manchester	Javelin
Gold medal – first place	2025 Birmingham	Javelin

Rebekah Walton (born 20 September 1999) is a British track and field athlete. She is a multiple-time national champion in the javelin.

== Early life ==
From Etwall in Derbyshire, she attended John Port Spencer Academy, and Repton School. Walton initially only started athletics at Burton Athletics Club to improve her netball skills. She was a student of Mechanical Engineering at Loughborough University.

== Career ==
A Blackheath & Bromley athlete, she joined the England Athletics pathway at sixteen years-old and is coached by David Turner.

Walton threw a new personal distance of 54.03m to become the British javelin throw champion after winning the British Championship for the first time, in June 2021. She was subsequently selected for the 2021 European Athletics U20 Championships, taking place in Tallinn, Estonia, in July 2021. At the event, she set a new personal best distance of 54.27m and ended up finishing in fifth place overall.

In 2022, she retained her British national title and represented Britain at the 2022 European Athletics Championships in Munich.

She was selected for the British team for the 2023 European Athletics Team Championships held in Chorzów, Poland in June 2023. At the event she recorded two-metre personal best distance of 59.76m and finished in the bronze medal position.

In July 2023, Walton clinched a third-consecutive national title at the British Championships held in Manchester.

She won the Loughborough International with a throw of 59.26 metres in May 2024. In June 2024, she retained her British national title in Manchester. In November 2024, she was named by British Athletics on the Olympic Futures Programme for 2025.

Walton threw 59.38 metres to win the Loughborough International in May 2025. She was selected for the 2025 European Athletics Team Championships in Madrid in June 2025, throwing 58.63 metres to place fourth overall. On 3 August 2025, she retained her national title at the 2025 UK Athletics Championships in Birmingham with 58.44m.
