= Athletics at the 1970 British Commonwealth Games – Women's javelin throw =

Women's javelin throw at the 1970 British Commonwealth Games
- Venue: Meadowbank Stadium, Edinburgh
- Dates: 25 July 1970

Medalists
gold medal	Petra Rivers	Australia
silver medal	Anne Farquhar	England
bronze medal	Jay Dahlgren	Canada

The women's javelin throw event at the 1970 British Commonwealth Games was held on 25 July at the Meadowbank Stadium in Edinburgh, Scotland.

== Results ==
Final result
Rank	Name	Nationality	Distance	Notes
1st place, gold medalist(s)	Petra Rivers	Australia	52.00	
2nd place, silver medalist(s)	Anne Farquhar	England	50.82	
3rd place, bronze medalist(s)	Jay Dahlgren	Canada	49.54	
4	Angela King	England	48.00	
5	Averil Williams	Wales	47.70	
6	Carol Martin	Canada	44.56	
7	Constance Rwabiryagye	Uganda	42.02	
8	Sally-Ann Mene	New Zealand	39.94	
	Gay Porter	Northern Ireland	DNS	
