= Reece Prescod =

British sprinter (born 1996)

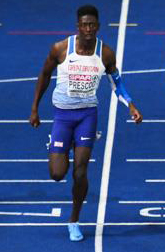
- Prescod at the 2018 European Athletics Championships

Personal information
- Born: 29 February 1996 (age 30) London, England
- Height: 1.93 m (6 ft 4 in)

Sport
- Sport: Track and field
- Event: Sprints
- Club: Enfield and Haringey Athletic Club
- Team: Nike
- Turned pro: 2015
- Coached by: Marvin Rowe

Achievements and titles
- World finals: 2017; 100 m, 7th 2022; 4x100 m, Bronze
- Personal bests: 100 m: 9.93 (2022); 200 m: 20.31 (2021); Indoors; 60 m: 6.49i (2023)
Medal record
Men's athletics
Representing Great Britain
World Championships
Bronze medal – third place	2022 Eugene	4×100 m relay
European Championships
Silver medal – second place	2018 Berlin	100 m

Reece Noel Prescod (born 29 February 1996) is a retired British sprinter. He represented his country at the delayed 2020 Summer Olympics. Prescod won the silver medal in the 100 metres at the 2018 European Championships and bronze for the 4 × 100 m relay at the 2022 World Championships.

== Biography ==
Prescod qualified in first place at the GB trials to gain selection for the 2017 World Championships in Athletics, ahead of former World Championships finalist James Dasaolu. He competed in the men's 100 metres at the event, finishing seventh in the final.

Having retained his British 200 metres British title in 2018, he finished second in the final of the 2018 European Athletics Championships, behind teammate Zharnel Hughes.

Prescod broke the 10-second barrier in the 100 metres for the first time in 2018 and did it four times that year (including a wind-assisted 9.88 s at the Eugene Diamond League event in Oregon, U.S.).

He won a silver medal in the 100 metres at the 2018 European Athletics Championships, finishing 0.01 s behind race winner Zharnel Hughes.

At the Tokyo Olympics in 2021, he reached the semi-finals.

He was part of the Great Britain men's 4 × 100 metres relay team which took bronze at the 2022 World Athletics Championships.

Prescod announced his retirement from professional athletics on 4 August 2025.

On 7 January 2026, Prescod announced that he would take part in the Enhanced Games.

== Achievements ==
=== Personal bests ===
Event	Time (s)	Wind (m/s)	Venue	Date	Notes
60 metres indoor	6.49	—N/a	Berlin, Germany	10 February 2023	
100 metres	9.93	–1.2	Ostrava, Czech Republic	31 May 2022	
100 metres	9.88w	+2.4	Eugene, OR, United States	26 May 2018	Wind-assisted
150 metres	14.87	+0.6	Gateshead, United Kingdom	8 September 2018	#8 all-time
200 metres	20.31	–0.4	Szczecin, Poland	15 August 2021	

== International competitions ==
Year	Competition	Venue	Position	Event	Result	Wind (m/s)	Notes
Representing (United Kingdom) Great Britain
2017	World Championships	London, United Kingdom	7th	100 m	10.17	−0.8	
2018	European Championships	Berlin, Germany	2nd	100 m	9.96	0.0	PB
2021	Olympic Games	Tokyo, Japan	– (sf)	100 m	DQ	−0.1	
2022	World Championships	Eugene, OR, United States	23rd (h)	100 m	10.15	+0.2	
2022	World Championships	Eugene, OR, United States	3rd	4 × 100 m relay	37.83	—N/a	
2022	European Championships	Munich, Germany	7th	100 m	10.18	+0.1	
2023	European Indoor Championships	Istanbul, Turkey	8th	60 m	6.64	—N/a	
2023	World Championships	Budapest, Hungary	23rd (sf)	100 m	10.26	−0.3	

=== Circuit wins, and National titles ===
- Diamond League
  - 2018: Shanghai (100m)
- British Athletics Championships
  - 100 metres: 2017, 2018
- British Indoor Athletics Championships
  - 60 metres: 2023

=== Seasonal bests ===
Year	60 metres	100 metres	200 metres
2012	—	—	21.92
2013	7.01	10.73	21.21
2014	—	10.71	—
2015	—	—	20.70
2016	—	10.04	20.38
2017	6.62	10.03	20.83
2018	6.61	9.94	—
2019	6.53	9.97	—
2020	—	—	—
2021	—	10.12	20.31
2022	—	9.93	20.55
2023	6.49	9.99	—

=== Track records ===
As of 6 September 2024, Prescod holds the following track records for 100 metres.

Location	Time	Windspeed m/s	Date
Newham	10.09	+ 1.2	07/05/2017
Savona	9.94	+ 2.7	24/05/2023

== Retirement ==
On 4 August 2025 Prescod announced his retirement from the track through his Instagram account, he said "Athletics has taught me invaluable lessons, the true meaning of hard work, dedication, and discipline".
