= Michael Denley =

British javelin thrower (1931–2013)

Personal information
- Nationality: British (English)
- Born: 21 November 1931 Wandsworth, London, England
- Died: 31 December 2013 (aged 82)
- Height: 180 cm (5 ft 11 in)
- Weight: 66 kg (146 lb)

Sport
- Sport: Athletics
- Event: Javelin throw
- Club: Thames Valley Harriers

Michael John Denley (21 November 1931 – 31 December 2013) was a British athlete who competed at the 1952 Summer Olympics. Denley died on 31 December 2013, at the age of 82.

== Biography ==
Denley was born in Wandsworth, London and educated at Hampton School. He won the 1949 AAA junior javelin title.

Denley became the British javelin throw champion after winning the British AAA Championships title at the 1950 AAA Championships.

After losing his AAA title to Italian Amos Matteucci at the 1951 AAA Championships, Denley regained it at the 1952 AAA Championships. Shortly afterwards he represented the Great Britain team at the 1952 Olympic Games in Helsinki, where he competed in the men's javelin throw competition.

Denley won another AAA javelin title at the 1953 AAA Championships.
