= Alicia Barrett =

British hurdler (born 1998)

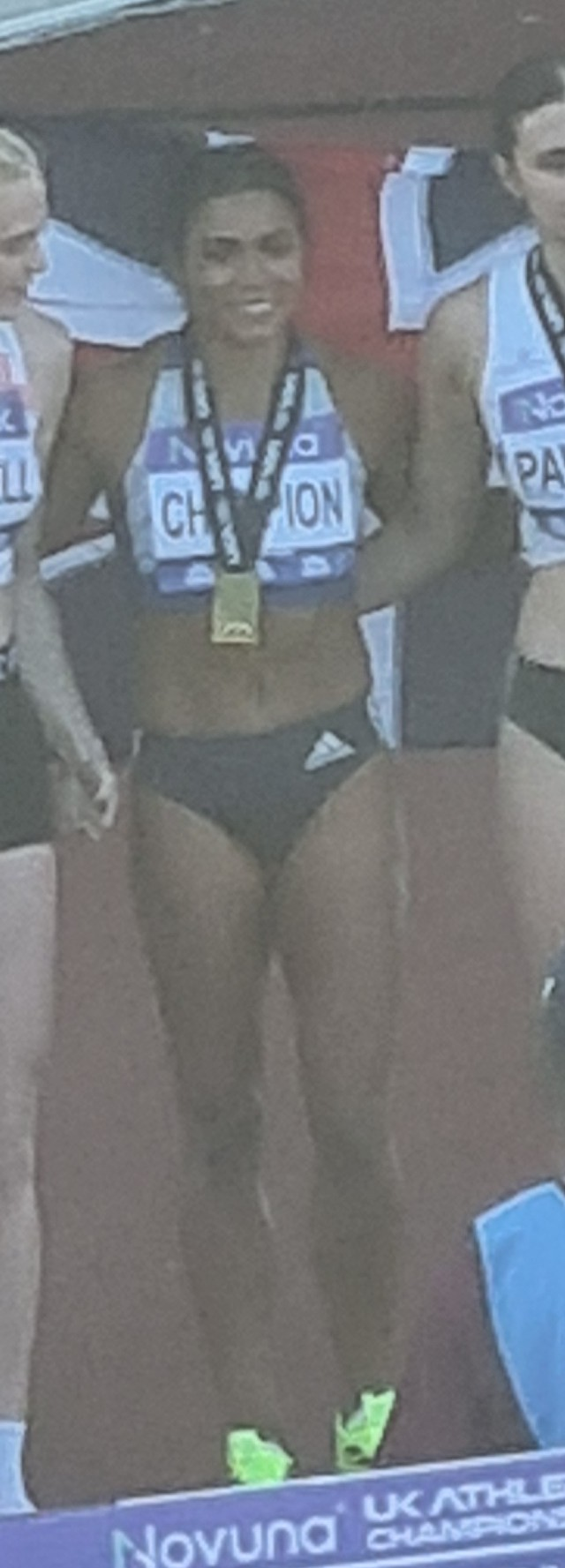
- Alicia Barrett at the 2025 UK Athletics Championships

Personal information
- Nationality: British
- Born: 25 March 1998 (age 28) Chesterfield, Derbyshire
- Education: Sheffield Hallam University
- Height: 1.62 m (5 ft 4 in)
- Weight: 62 kg (137 lb)

Sport
- Sport: Athletics
- Event: 100 metres hurdles
- Club: Sheffield & Dearne AC

Achievements and titles
- Personal best(s): 100 mH: 12.97 (London, 2025)

Alicia Helen Barrett (born 25 March 1998) is a British hurdler.

== Biography ==
In 2017, Barrett became the British 100 metres hurdles champions after winning the event at the 2017 British Athletics Championships.

Barrett competed in the women's 100 metres hurdles at the 2017 World Championships in Athletics in London, finishing last in her heat in a time of 13.42s.

She was selected to represent England at the 2018 Commonwealth Games on the Gold Coast in Australia, where she made it into the women's 100 metres hurdles final and came eighth.

Barrett won a second British title in 2018 and won the event for the third time at the 2025 UK Athletics Championships.
