= James Whiteaker =

English javelin thrower

Personal information
- Born: 8 October 1998 (age 27)

Sport
- Sport: Athletics
- Event: Javelin throw
- Club: Blackheath & Bromley Harriers

James Whiteaker (born 8 October 1998) is an English athlete specialising in the Javelin throw.

== Biography ==
Whiteaker became British champion when winning the javelin throw event at the 2018 British Athletics Championships. Further success came when he won the British title at the 2020 British Athletics Championships with a throw of 75.99 metres and the 2022 British Athletics Championships.

He represented Great Britain at the 2018 Athletics World Cup in London and finished in fifth place.
