= Prudence French =

English javelin thrower

Pru French
Personal information
- Nationality: British (English)
- Born: 4 May 1950 (age 75) Romford, England

Sport
- Sport: Athletics
- Event: javelin
- Club: Chelsea College of P. E.

Prudence Elizabeth French (born 1950), is a female former athlete who competed for England.

== Biography ==
French finished third behind Sue Platt in the javelin throw event at the 1968 WAAA Championships.

French became the national javelin throw champion after winning the British WAAA Championships title at the 1972 WAAA Championships.

French represented England in the javelin event, at the 1974 British Commonwealth Games in Christchurch, New Zealand.
