= Phil Norman =

English steeplechase runner

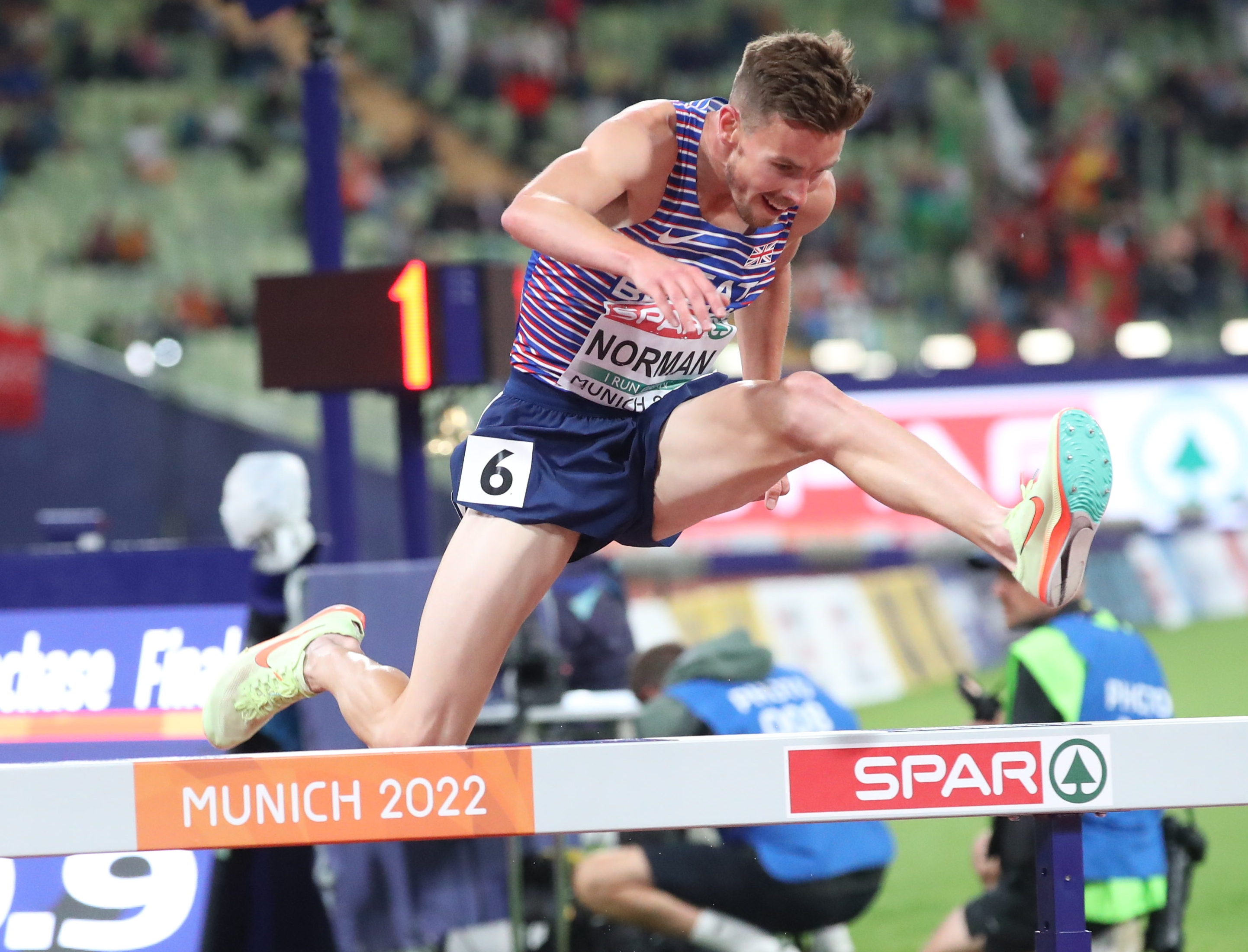
- Norman in 2022

Personal information
- Born: 20 October 1989 (age 35) Devon, England
- Home town: Barnstaple, Devon

Sport
- Sport: Athletics
- Event: 3000 metres steeplechase
- Club: Woodford Green with Essex Ladies
- Coached by: Tomaz Plibersek

Philip Norman (born 20 October 1989) is an English athlete specialising in the 3000 metres steeplechase. He competed at the 2020 Summer Olympics.

== Biography ==
He became British champion when winning the 3000 metres steeplechase event at the 2020 British Athletics Championships in a time of 8 min 32.51 secs.

At the delayed 2020 Olympic Games in Tokyo, he represented Great Britain in 2021, where he went out in the semi-finals.

Norman set a personal best of 8:18.65 in winning the steeplechase title at the 2024 British Athletics Championships, but was not selected for the Paris Olympics, despite being given an invitation to compete by World Athletics, as his time was 0.15 seconds off the standard set by UK Athletics.

Norman won his third British outdoor title at the 2025 UK Athletics Championships.
