= Sophie Cook (athlete) =

English athlete

Personal information
- Nationality: British (English)
- Born: 12 September 1994 (age 31) Dudley, Birmingham, England

Sport
- Sport: Athletics
- Event: Pole vault
- Club: Halesowen AC

Sophie Cook (born 12 September 1994) is an English international athlete. She has represented England at the Commonwealth Games.

== Biography ==
Cook won the British indoor high jump title at the 2020 British Indoor Athletics Championships and has won three silver medals at the British Athletics Championships in 2018, 2019 and 2020 and a bronze medal at the 2021 British Athletics Championships. She recorded a personal best of 4.45 metres at the 2022 Diamond League in Birmingham.

In 2022, she was selected for the women's pole vault event at the 2022 Commonwealth Games in Birmingham.

In 2023, she was selected for the British team for the 2023 European Athletics Team Championships held in Chorzów, Silesia, Poland between 20 and 25 June 2023.
