= Amelia Campbell (shot putter) =

English shot putter

Amelia Campbell (née Strickler)
Personal information
- Nationality: British/American
- Born: Amelia Strickler; 24 January 1994 (age 32) Ohio, United States
- Education: Miami University, Oxford, Ohio
- Height: 171 cm (5 ft 7 in)
- Weight: 100 kg (220 lb)

Sport
- Sport: Athletics
- Event: Shot put
- Club: Thames Valley Harriers
- Coached by: Zane Duquemin
Medal record
Shot put
Representing Great Britain
British Athletics Championships
Gold medal – first place	2018 Birmingham	Shot Put
Gold medal – first place	2024 Manchester	Shot Put
British Indoor Athletics Championships
Gold medal – first place	2020 Glasgow	Shot Put

Amelia Campbell née Strickler (born 24 January 1994) is an American born, British shot putter who represents Great Britain and England in international athletics events.

== Biography ==
Strickler was born in Ohio to an American father, Randal Strickler; and a British mother, Cecilia. She has held dual citizenship since birth and chose to represent Great Britain internationally after moving to the United Kingdom with her mother in 2016.

She studied microbiology at Miami University, Ohio.

Strickler finished sixth at the 2022 Commonwealth Games. In 2018, she became the British shot put champion after winning the title at the 2018 British Athletics Championships. She later won gold at the 2020 British Indoor Athletic Championships.

In 2024, Campbell (under her married name) won a second British outdoor title, after winning the shot put event at the 2024 British Athletics Championships with a throw of 17.59 metres.
