= Dave Travis =

British javelin thrower

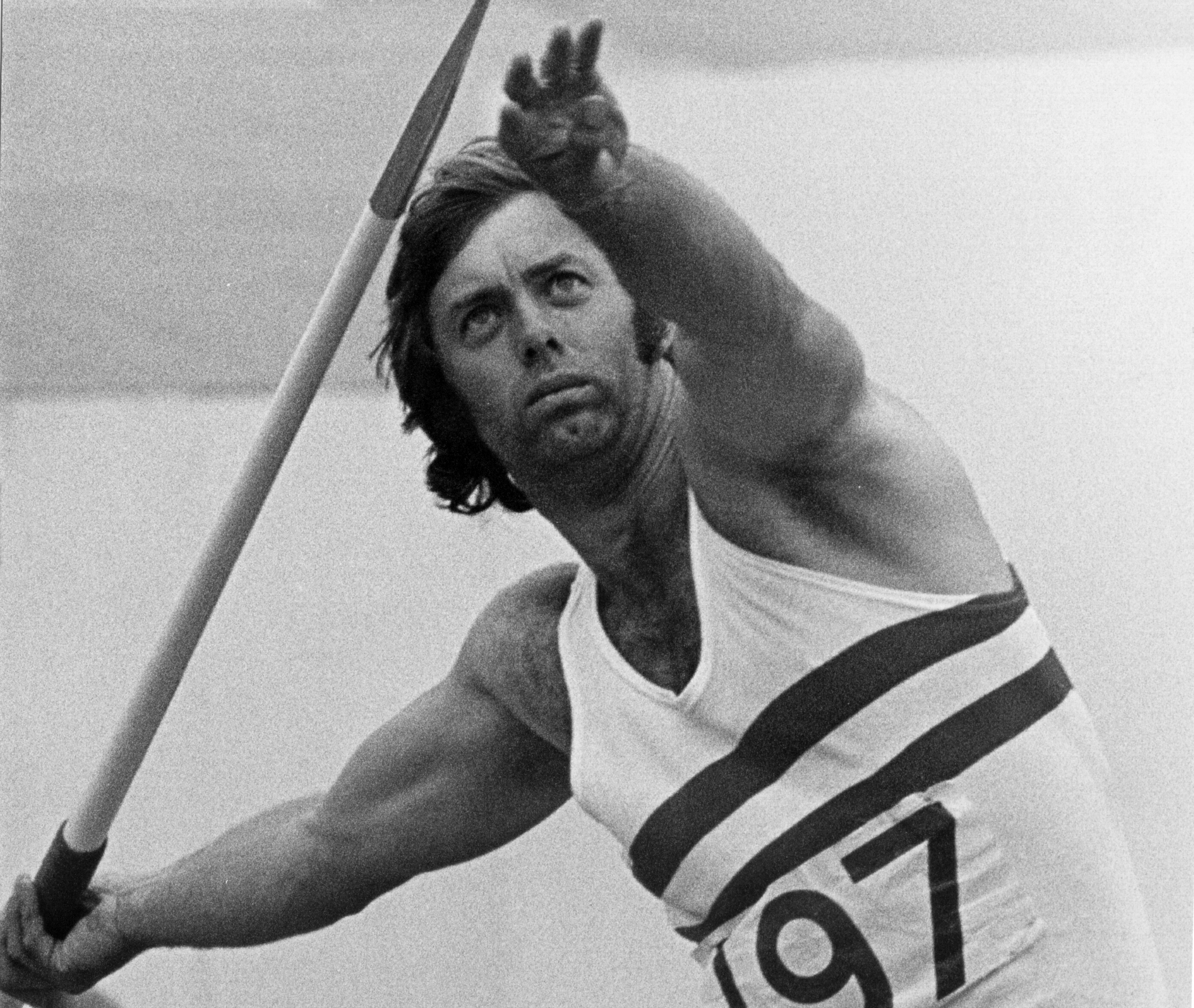

Personal information
- Full name: David Howard Travis
- Born: 9 September 1945 (age 80) Twickenham, London, UK
- Height: 6 ft 0 in (183 cm)
- Weight: 190 lb (86 kg)

Sport
- Sport: Athletics
- Event: Javelin
- Club: Surrey AC
Medal record
Representing Great Britain
World Student Games
Gold medal – first place	1967 Tokyo	Javelin throw
Representing England
Commonwealth Games
Gold medal – first place	1970 Edinburgh	Javelin throw
Silver medal – second place	1974 Christchurch	Javelin throw

David Howard Travis (born 9 September 1945) was a British javelin thrower. He competed at the 1968 and 1972 summer Olympics in the javelin and won a gold medal in the 1967 World Student Games and the 1970 Commonwealth Games. He was an international athlete from 1965 to 1978 and the British record holder for 4 years.

== Early life and school sport ==
He was born in Strawberry Hill, south west London, in 1945 and lived for the first eleven years in East Twickenham, subsequently moving to Hinchley Wood near Esher. He attended Hampton Grammar School from 1957 to 1964 where his talent for sport was nurtured. He excelled at school athletics in a variety of events, making his debut at the English Schools Championships in 1960, placing second in the under 15 shot. Two titles in the javelin were achieved in 1963 and 1964, whilst also figuring in the winning sprint relay team for Middlesex Schools in 1962. His club career for Surrey Athletic Club included a British under 19 record of 70.70m in 1964. He left secondary school with national status in three disciplines: javelin, decathlon and rugby.

== Education and career ==
He went on to study at Loughborough College from 1965 to 1968, gaining a Teaching Qualification and a First Class Diploma. From 1968 to 1990 he forged a career as a PE teacher and Pastoral Head at Sidney Stringer, Coventry, before going on to a sport development career which culminated in becoming Director of Sport in Education for Bristol City Council. In 1999 this work was recognised with a national Sportsmatch Award.

== Sport (javelin/decathlon) ==
Following a successful schools athletic career, he made his senior international debut in the javelin in 1965 and was selected for the Empire Games in Jamaica in 1966. A year later in 1967 he won the World Student Games title in Tokyo and made the Olympic team in 1968 in Mexico City. He was coached at the time by Colin Smith, hitherto Britain’s most successful javelin thrower at international level. The main event in 1969 was the European Championships in Athens. Although placing only 9th, the best result yet for Britain in this event, it could have been much better with a throw ruled flat by the judges which would have won a bronze medal.

1970 was to prove his best year, setting a UK record of 82.22m in July, winning the Commonwealth Games title by almost 3 metres, and scoring a significant victory in the European Cup beating Janis Lusis, the Olympic champion and world record holder from Russia, with a British Record throw of 83.44 m. He also won the 1970 AAA Championships title.

He maintained his domestic dominance through the early 70s - winning seven AAA Championships javelin titles from 1965 to 1974 - and represented England gaining a silver medal at the 1974 Commonwealth Games in New Zealand. Although regularly exceeding 80 metres in competition, his personal best remained the same despite qualifying 2nd in the European Championships in Rome with a throw of 82.38 m. He proved to be one of the most consistent UK javelin throwers recording 21 throws over 80m between 1969 and 1974.

His decathlon career started in 1964 with a British junior record, and in 1965 he made his international senior debut setting a short lived UK record mark. In 1968 he attempted to qualify for both the javelin and decathlon for the Olympic Games in Mexico City but fell just short with a new personal best of 7,067 points. At the end of that season he left the decathlon behind to concentrate on the javelin.

== Sport (rugby union/weightlifting) ==
He combined rugby with athletics at school and reached the top representative level. In 1963/4 he was selected for English Schools in matches against Wales (twice) and France as a wing three quarter, and in the selection trials he was selected ahead of David Duckham, who later went on to be a major figure in the English senior team. He represented Loughborough Colleges in 1965 playing outside the legendary Welsh player Gerald Davis but he halted his career that year to concentrate on athletics. A brief return to the game for the 1970/71 season for Richmond proved to be his last first class appearance, although later in life he represented Barker Butts RFC in the Warwickshire Cup Final at the age of 38.

Alongside his athletics training, he developed an expertise in Olympic Weightlifting for the Twickenham and Sunbury clubs. This resulted in Middlesex and South East England titles with personal bests of 105 kg for the snatch and 135 kg for the clean and jerk.

== Sport (coaching) ==
As his throwing days came to an end, he became involved in coaching with a group of throwers in Birmingham including Dave Ottley and John Trower, which led to a brief spell as National Event Coach. His guidance helped Dave Ottley to a silver medal at the 1984 Olympic Games and launched John Trower as a high level coach who would go on to assist Steve Backley and Mick Hill to international titles.
