= Sally Peake =

British pole vaulter (born 1986)

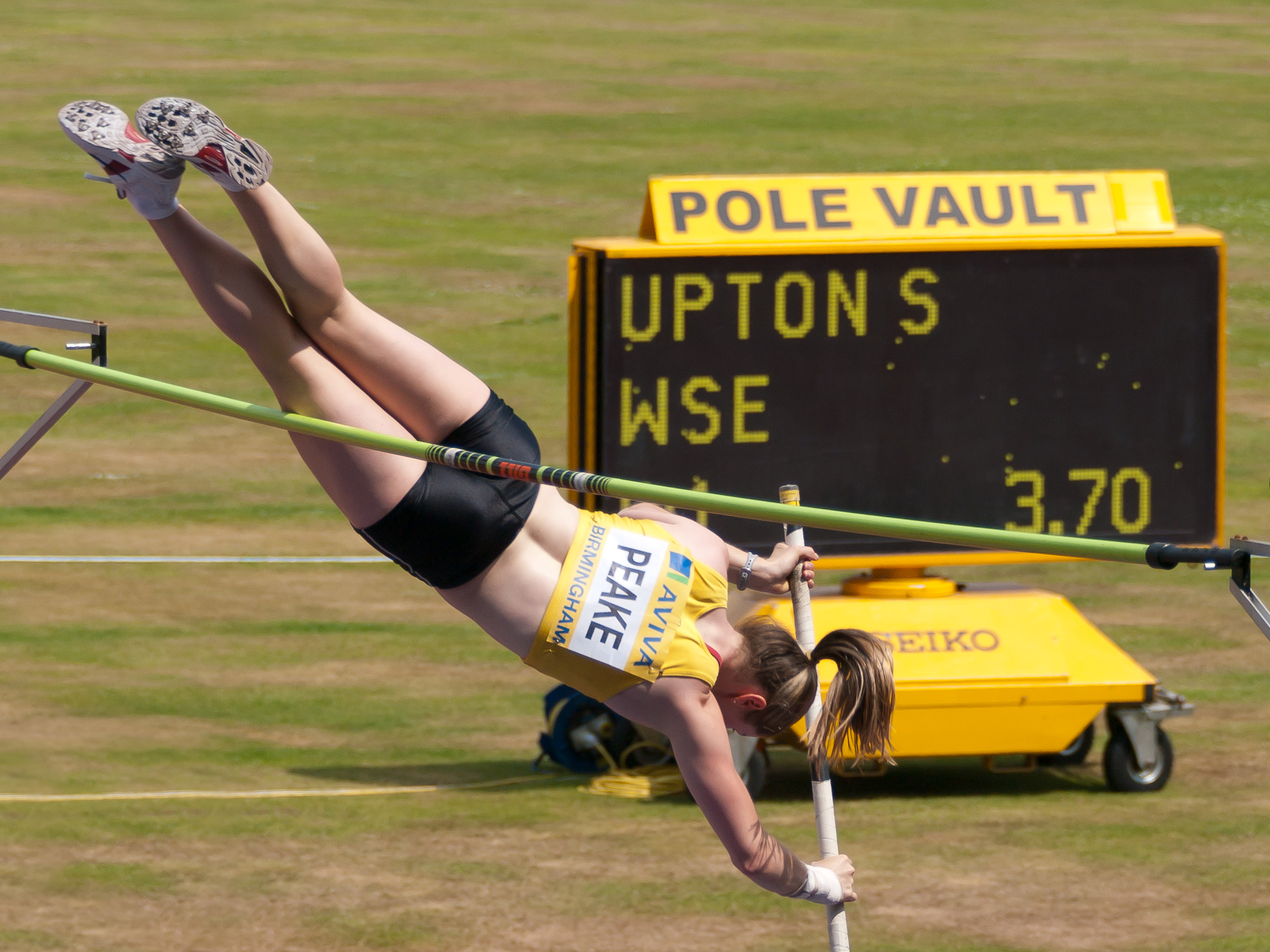
- Peake at the Aviva 2010 UK Athletics Championships, 2010

Personal information
- Nationality: British (Welsh)
- Born: 10 May 1984 (age 42) Chester, England, United Kingdom
- Height: 1.64 m (5 ft 4 1/2 in)
- Weight: 54 kg (119 lb) (2014)

Sport
- Sport: Women's athletics
- Event: Pole vault
- Club: Liverpool Harriers; Birchfield Harriers
Medal record
Representing Wales
Commonwealth Games
Silver medal – second place	2014 Glasgow	Pole vault

Sally Peake (born 8 February 1986) is a British track and field athlete who specialises in the pole vault. She has a personal best of 4.40 m (14 ft 5 in) for the event, which is a Welsh record. She was the silver medallist in the pole vault at the 2014 Commonwealth Games.

Peake is a two-time British champion (2013 and 2014). She has represented Great Britain at the 2011 Summer Universiade and the 2012 European Athletics Championships, as well as having competed for Wales at the 2010 Commonwealth Games.

In addition to her pole vaulting career, she is a physiotherapist for the Football Association of Wales.

== Career ==
Born in Chester, Peake initially competed in gymnastics but gave up the sport in favour of track and field as she grew older. She joined Liverpool Harriers and focused on triple jump and long jump during her early years at the club. She was the 2005 Welsh junior champion in the triple jump and then won the 2006 Welsh indoor title in a personal best of 12.28 m (40 ft 3 1/4 in). She struggled to progress in the events and took up pole vaulting at the end of 2008. In 2007, she graduated from Cardiff University with a first-class honours science degree and continued to specialise in physiotherapy. The 2009 season marked her first full year of pole vault competition and she set a best of 3.60 m (11 ft 9 1/2 in). She cleared four metres for the first time in June 2010, reaching a height of 4.10 m (13 ft 5 1/4 in) in Cardiff. This gained her selection for the Welsh team for the 2010 Commonwealth Games and at the event in New Delhi she placed ninth with a mark of 3.95 m (12 ft 11 1/2 in). she has a personal best of 4.40m in pole vault

In 2011, she moved to Loughborough to be closer to her coach Scott Simpson. That year she placed third at the UK Athletics Indoor Championships and won the Welsh outdoor title with a vault of 4.30 m (14 ft 1 1/4 in). She narrowly missed the podium with a fourth-place finish at the British Athletics Championships. Peake matched that finish on her international debut at the Universiade in Shenzhen, clearing a new best of 4.35 m (14 ft 3 1/4 in) in the final. With her sights on a place at the 2012 London Olympics, she signed up with Birchfield Harriers and continued to improve the following year, achieving a height of 4.42 m (14 ft 6 in) on the Perche Élite Tour in February. She retained her Welsh title and was runner-up at the British Olympic trials (behind Holly Bleasdale), but did not achieve the qualifying "A" standard, which was set at four and a half metres. Her senior debut at the 2012 European Athletics Championships followed and she competed in the qualifying only.

The peak of her 2013 season was a win at the British Athletics Championships where—in the absence of Bleasdale—she won with a height of 4.23 m (13 ft 10 1/2 in). She also competed at her first IAAF Diamond League event, vaulting at the London Anniversary Games and placing eighth. She did not compete internationally that year. She placed third at the 2014 British Indoor Championships before going on to win the British outdoor title for a second year running. She was beaten by Northern Ireland's Zoe Brown at the Welsh Open Championships, but was still selected for Wales at the 2014 Commonwealth Games. Immediately prior to the competition, she set an outdoor best of 4.40 m (14 ft 5 in) at the Glasgow Grand Prix test event. At the Commonwealth Games in Glasgow she won her first international medal, clearing 4.25 m (13 ft 11 1/4 in) in very wet conditions to take the silver medal for Wales.

== Personal bests ==
- Pole vault – 4.40 m (14 ft 5 in) (2014)
- Pole vault indoor – 4.42 m (14 ft 6 in) (2012)
- Long jump – 5.87 m (19 ft 3 in) (2008)
- Triple jump – 12.05 m (39 ft 6 1/4 in) (2008)
- Triple jump indoor – 12.21 m (40 ft 1/2 in) (2008)

== International competition record ==
Year	Competition	Venue	Position	Notes	
2010	Commonwealth Games	New Delhi, India	9th	Pole vault	
2011	Universiade	Shenzhen, China	4th	Pole vault	
2012	European Championships	Helsinki, Finland	20th (qualifying)	Pole vault	
2014	Commonwealth Games	Glasgow, United Kingdom	2nd	Pole vault	
2018	Commonwealth Games	Gold Coast, Australia	10th	Pole vault	4.30 m
