= Joe Dunderdale =

British javelin thrower (born 1992)

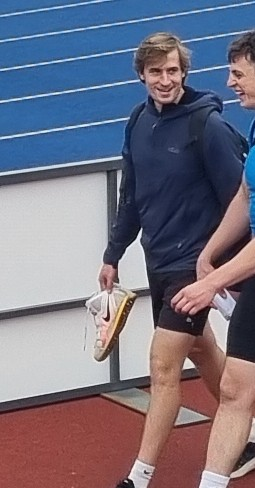
- 2025 UK Athletics Championships

Personal information
- Nationality: British (English)
- Born: 4 September 1992 (age 33) Scunthorpe, England

Sport
- Sport: Track and Field
- Event: Javelin throw
- Club: City of Sheffield and Dearne AC
Medal record
Representing England
British Championships
Gold medal – first place	2023 Manchester	javelin
Gold medal – first place	2024 Manchester	javelin

Joseph Alex Dunderdale (born 4 September 1992) is a British athlete specialising in the Javelin throw. He is a two-times British champion in the javelin.

== Career ==
Dunderdale came to prominence in 2017, after winning the British javelin title at the British Athletics Championships.

In 2023, he represented Great Britain at the 2023 European Athletics Team Championships.

Dunderdale became a two time British champion in 2024, after winning the gold medal at the 2024 British Athletics Championships, held in Manchester, with a throw of 75.06 metres.
