= Dan Bramble =

English long jumper

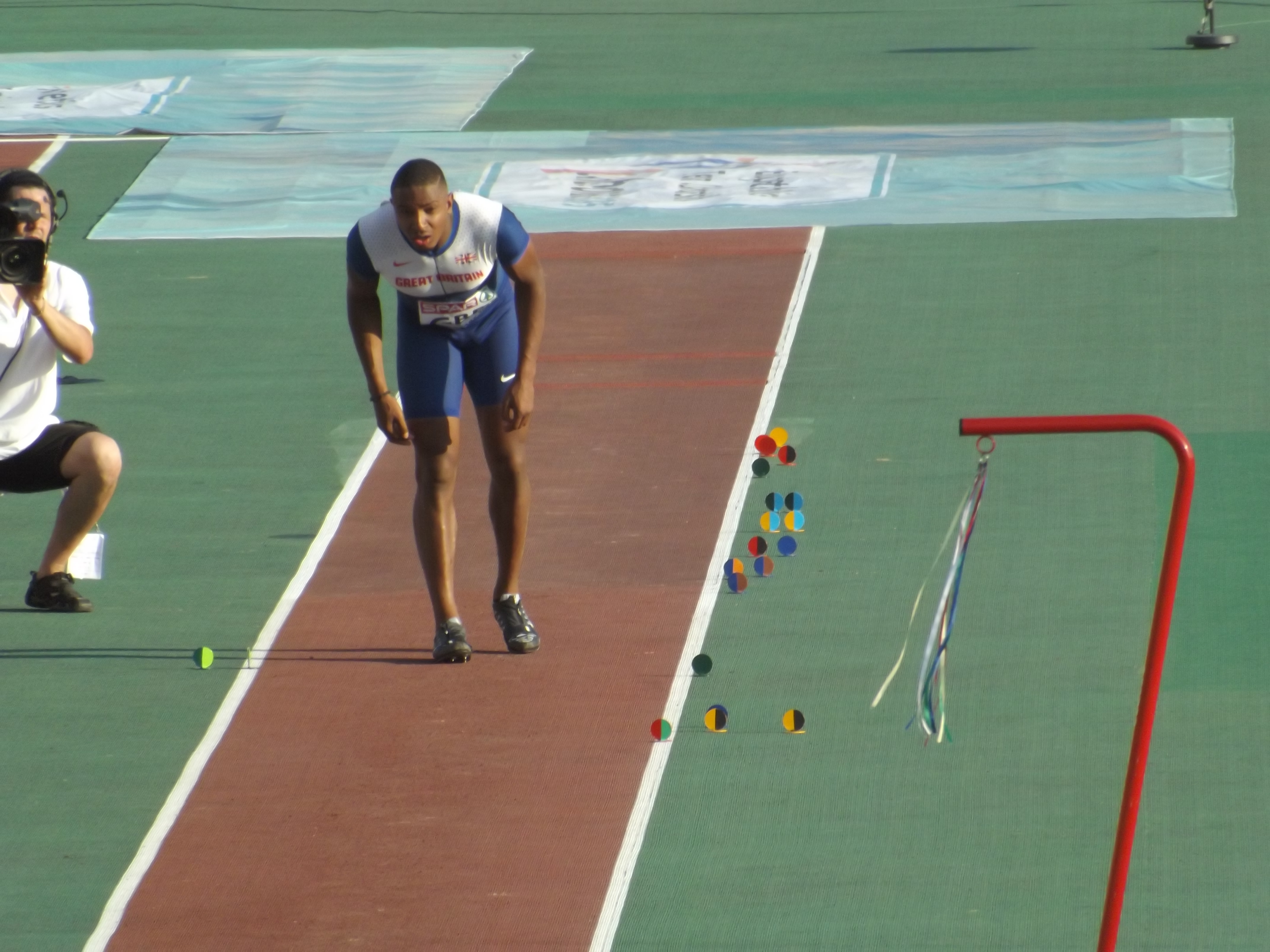
- Bramble at the 2015 European Team Championships

Personal information
- Born: 14 October 1990 (age 35) Chesterfield, England

Sport
- Sport: Athletics
- Event: Long jump
- Club: Shaftesbury Barnet Harriers
- Coached by: Pat Cornell (-2010); Larry Achike (2011-2012); Frank Attoh (2012–)

Daniel Bramble (born 14 October 1990) is an English athlete specialising in the long jump. He represented his country at the 2015 World Championships, the 2016 World Indoor Championships and Commonwealth Games.

== Biography ==
His personal bests in the event are 8.21 metres outdoors (+1.8 m/s, Clermont 2015) and 8.14 metres indoors (Portland 2016).

Bramble became the British long jump champion after winning the 2017 British Athletics Championships. Additionally, he finished runner-up five times.

He represented England at the 2018 Commonwealth Games in Gold Coast.

== Competition record ==
Year	Competition	Venue	Position	Event	Notes
Representing Great Britain and England
2015	European Team Championships	Cheboksary, Russia	8th	Long jump	7.61 m
2015	European Team Championships	Cheboksary, Russia	11th	Triple jump	15.92 m
2015	World Championships	Beijing, China	18th (q)	Long jump	7.83 m
2016	World Indoor Championships	Portland, United States	6th	Long jump	8.14 m
2017	European Team Championships	Lille, France	1st	Long jump	8.00 m
2017	European Indoor Championships	Belgrade, Serbia	12th (q)	Long jump	7.64 m
2018	Commonwealth Games	Gold Coast, Australia	5th	Long jump	7.94 m
2018	European Championships	Berlin, Germany	6th	Long jump	7.90 m
