= Bethan Partridge =

British female athlete

Bethan Partridge (born 11 July 1990 in Shrewsbury) is an English athlete who competes in the high jump event. She has a personal best performance of 1.91 metres.

== Athletics career ==
Partridge competed at the 2014 Commonwealth Games in Glasgow, Scotland but did not reach the final. She went on to achieve 8th place at the 2018 Commonwealth Games on the Gold Coast, Queensland, Australia.

Partridge has also won two British indoor titles in 2017 and 2020.
