= Harry Coppell =

English pole vaulter

Personal information
- Born: 11 July 1996 (age 30) Wigan, England

Sport
- Sport: Athletics
- Event: Pole vault
- Club: Wigan & District
- Coached by: Scott Simpson
Medal record
Men's athletics
Representing England
Commonwealth Games
Bronze medal – third place	2022 Birmingham	pole vault

Harry Coppell (born 11 July 1996) is an English athlete specialising in the pole vault. He competed at the delayed 2020 Summer Olympics.

== Early life ==
Coppell grew up in Wigan. He attended Up Holland High School.

== Career ==
Coppell became British champion when winning the pole vault event at the 2019 British Athletics Championships. He then successfully defended his title at the 2020 British Athletics Championships with a British record jump of 5.85 metres.

At the delayed 2020 Olympic Games in Tokyo, he represented Great Britain and placed 7th in the pole vault event. Coppell represented England at the 2022 Commonwealth Games in Birmingham, where he won a bronze medal.

Coppell won a 3rd, 4th and 5th British title in 2021, 2022 and 2024 respectively.
