= Nikki Manson =

Scottish female athlete

Nikki Manson (born 15 October 1994 in Glasgow) is a Scottish athlete who competes in the high jump event. She has a personal best performance of 1.93 metres.

== Athletics career ==
Manson was an All-American jumper for the Akron Zips track and field team, finishing 5th in the high jump at the 2017 NCAA Division I Outdoor Track and Field Championships.

Manson achieved 7th place at the 2018 Commonwealth Games in Queensland, Australia and has represented Great Britain at the 2018 European championships in Berlin.

She is also the Scottish Indoor record holder with a height of 1.93 metres achieved in February 2020.
