= Laura Whittingham =

English female athlete

Personal information
- Nationality: British (English)
- Born: 6 June 1986 (age 39)

Sport
- Sport: Athletics
- Event: javelin throw
- Club: Sale Harriers Manchester; Loughborough Students

Laura Whittingham (born 6 June 1986) is an English athlete who competes in the javelin. She has a personal best distance of 60.68 metres.

== Biography ==
Whittingham represented England at the 2010 Commonwealth Games in Delhi. just missing a bronze medal by finishing 4th.

She has won three British titles in 2017, 2018 and 2019 and has reached 3rd place on the British all time rankings with the new specification javelin which was introduced in 1999.
