= UK Athletics =

Governing body for athletics in the UK

- Sport: Athletics
- Abbreviation: UKA
- Founded: 1999
- Affiliation: World Athletics
- Regional affiliation: European Athletics
- Location: Birmingham, England
- President: Denise Lewis
- Chairman: Ian Beattie
- Replaced: British Athletics Federation

Official website
- www.uka.org.uk
- (United Kingdom)

UK Athletics (UKA) is the governing body for the sport of athletics in the United Kingdom. It is responsible for overseeing the governance of athletics events in the UK as well as athletes, their development, and athletics officials. The organisation outwardly rebranded itself as British Athletics in 2013, although it remains legally known as UK Athletics, and continues to use the UK Athletics name in internal governance. Among other duties, the organisation selects athletes to represent Great Britain and Northern Ireland in international competitions outside the Commonwealth Games, and organises the major national championships in Great Britain for the sport indoors and out. in 2023 the organisation began once more to brand its national championships under the UK Athletics Championships title, but the remain one and the same championships.

UK Athletics is structured as a non-profit company limited by guarantee. It has four member organisations from each of the constituent countries of the United Kingdom: England Athletics, Scottish Athletics, Welsh Athletics, and Athletics Northern Ireland.

== History ==
UK Athletics was founded in 1999 as a successor to the British Athletics Federation, which had collapsed for financial reasons. Prominent among the reasons was the cost of the legal bills in the Diane Modahl contract dispute case.

The British Athletics brand

Former long-distance runner David Moorcroft, previously Chief Executive of the British Athletics Federation, continued in the same role at the newly formed UKA. He headed the organisation until 2006 when he stepped down after Great Britain's worst performance at a European Athletics Championships for twenty years. The results in Gothenburg (their sole gold medal coming in the 100 m relay) were below expectations and failed to meet the target for improving British athletics in preparation for the upcoming 2012 London Olympics. Moorcroft's departure triggered a restructuring of the organisation and the creation of the role of chairman, to which businessman Ed Warner was appointed.

Charles van Commenee was made national head coach, a newly created role, in September 2008. Shortly afterwards Peter Eriksson was appointed head coach of the Paralympic Programme. Van Commenee stepped down after the London 2012 Olympics due to the team's failure to meet the medal target he had set. This was despite a reasonably favourable reaction to Britain's achievement of six medals and the desire of UK Athletics that he should remain in the post. Van Commenee was succeeded by Peter Eriksson, who served only seven months of a five-year contract before resigning for personal reasons. UKA Performance Director Neil Black was appointed temporary replacement. A restructuring announced in December 2013 saw the single role of head coach replaced by three heads of department (endurance, sprints and field events).

The athletes compete in Olympic competition under the brand name of Team GB.

The current CEO is Jack Buckner and the Chair is Ian Beattie. Denise Lewis was elected as the organisation's president in December 2023, succeeding Jason Gardener, but stepped down temporarily from the post in February 2024. Lewis resumed the presidency of UK Athletics in August 2024 after leaving her role as a BBC pundit.

== See also ==
- British records in athletics
- British Grand Prix
- London Grand Prix
- England Athletics
- Scottish Athletics
- Welsh Athletics
