= British Athletics Championships =

Premier national championship in track and field

- Current season, competition or edition: 2026 UK Athletics Championships
- Sport: Track and field
- Founded: 2007
- Country: United Kingdom

The British Athletics Championships is the premier national championship in track and field held in the United Kingdom, and are organised by British Athletics. The event has doubled as the main trials meet for international team selection for major events in which Great Britain and Northern Ireland compete, including the Olympic Games, the IAAF World Championships in Athletics and the European Athletics Championships. Only British athletes may formally compete, though in some circumstances British club-affiliated foreign athletes may take part as guests. Since 2023 the Championships have been promoted as the UK Athletics Championships, but are fully a continuation of the British Athletics championships, and separate from the same-named championships held between 1977 and 1997. Since the collapse of the British Athletics Federation, UK Athletics and British Athletics have been brands owned and used by the same organisation.

The event was established in 2007, replacing the AAA Championships as the principal event on the domestic athletics calendar in the United Kingdom. The previous event named the UK Athletics Championships had nominally been the national championship, but in effect took second billing to the "triple A's". The creation of the British Athletics Championships as the main national championship and selection event, brought the governance of the elite level of the sport and team selection firmly under the new national body for the sport, moving away from the Amateur Athletic Association of England, which had served that role since 1880. A 2001 British Championship in women's 3000 metres steeplechase was held as a one-off at Scotstoun Stadium, due to the growing popularity of the event among women and its absence from the AAA Championships programme (the event was added a year later).

A number of events are not included, or included only sporadically, at the championships. The combined events of decathlon and heptathlon are usually, but not always, held separately, while the elite races at the Night of 10,000 metre PBs meet in Highgate has included the British championships in that event since 2016. The championships often feature shorter track based racewalking events as exhibition championships, but not the longer road based distances run at major championships. finally, relays tend not to held at the championships.

== Editions ==
City	Venue	Year/s
Manchester	Manchester Regional Arena	2007, 2020, 2021, 2022, 2023, 2024
Birmingham	Alexander Stadium	2008, 2009, 2010, 2011, 2012, 2013, 2014, 2015, 2016, 2017, 2018, 2019, 2025, 2026

== Championships records ==
=== Men ===
Event	Record	Athlete/Team	Date	Championships	Place	Ref.
100 m	9.91 (+1.1 m/s)	James Dasaolu	13 July 2013	2013 Championships	Birmingham	
200 m	19.90 (+1.3 m/s)	Zharnel Hughes	3 August 2025	2025 Championships	Birmingham	
400 m	44.36	Iwan Thomas	13 July 1997	1997 Championships	Birmingham	
400 m hurdles	48.54	Alastair Chalmers	30 June 2024	2024 Championships	Manchester	
3000 m steeplechase	8:18.65	Phil Norman	30 June 2024	2024 Championships	Manchester	
Pole vault	5.85 m	Harry Coppell	4 September 2020	2020 Championships	Manchester	
Discus throw	68.81 m	Lawrence Okoye	20 June 2026	2026 Championships	Birmingham	
5000 m walk (track)	18:41.23	Callum Wilkinson	24 August 2019	2019 Championships	Birmingham	
10,000 m walk (track)	38:43.91 NR	Callum Wilkinson	30 June 2024	2024 Championships	Manchester	

=== Women ===
Event	Record	Athlete/Team	Date	Championships	Place	Ref.
100 m	10.96 (−0.9 m/s)	Dina Asher-Smith	24 August 2019	2019 Championships	Birmingham	
200 m	22.14 (+1.9 m/s)	Dina Asher-Smith	3 August 2025	2025 Championships	Birmingham	
400 m	50.47	Amber Anning	30 June 2024	2024 Championships	Manchester	
100 m hurdles	12.65 (+1.5 m/s)	Marcia Sey	20 June 2026	2026 Championships	Birmingham	
3000 m steeplechase	9:16.95	Elise Thorner	20 June 2026	2026 Championships	Birmingham	
High jump	1.97 m	Morgan Lake	30 June 2018	2018 Championships	Birmingham	
Pole vault	4.90 m NR	Holly Bradshaw	26 June 2021	2021 Championships	Manchester	
Long jump	7.05 m (+1.2 m/s)	Lorraine Ugen	1 July 2018	2018 Championships	Birmingham	
Hammer throw	72.96 m	Anna Purchase	2 August 2025	2025 Championships	Birmingham	
Heptathlon	5929 pts	Jodie Smith	25–26 June 2022	2022 Championships	Manchester	
Heptathlon	100m H / High jump / Shot put / 200m / Long jump / Javelin / 800m; 13.57 (+3.2 m/s) / 1.77 m / 11.67 m / 24.80 (+3.4 m/s) / 6.11 m (+2.2 m/s) / 42.39 m / 2:21.15					

== See also ==
- List of British athletics champions
