= 2025 European Athletics Indoor Championships – Women's long jump =

Women's long jump at the 2025 European Athletics Indoor Championships
- Venue: Omnisport Apeldoorn
- Location: Apeldoorn, Netherlands
- Dates: 7 March 2025 (qualification); 8 March 2025 (final)
- Competitors: 18 from 15 nations
- Winning mark: 6.94

Medalists
gold medal	Larissa Iapichino	Italy
silver medal	Annik Kälin	Switzerland
bronze medal	Malaika Mihambo	Germany

The women's long jump at the 2025 European Athletics Indoor Championships was held on the short track of Omnisport in Apeldoorn, Netherlands, on 7 and 8 March 2025. This was the 38th time the event was contested at the European Athletics Indoor Championships. Athletes can qualify by achieving the entry standard or by their World Athletics Ranking in the event.

The qualifying round is scheduled for 7 March during the morning session. The final is scheduled for 8 March during the evening session.

== Background ==
The women's long jump was contested 37 times before 2025, held every time since the first edition of the European Athletics Indoor Championships (1970–2023). The 2025 European Athletics Indoor Championships will be held in Omnisport Apeldoorn in Apeldoorn, Netherlands. The removable indoor athletics track was retopped for these championships in September 2024.

Heike Drechsler is the world and European record holder in the event, with a distance of 7.37 m, set in 1988. The championship record is also held by Drechsler and was set at the 1988 championships.

Records before the 2025 European Athletics Indoor Championships
Record	Athlete (nation)	Distance (m)	Location	Date
World record	Heike Drechsler (GDR)	7.37	Vienna, Austria	13 February 1988
European record	Heike Drechsler (GDR)	7.37	Vienna, Austria	13 February 1988
Championship record	Heike Drechsler (GDR)	7.30	Budapest, Hungary	5 March 1988
World leading	Malaika Mihambo (GER)	7.07	Karlsruhe, Germany	18 February 2025
European leading	Malaika Mihambo (GER)	7.07	Karlsruhe, Germany	18 February 2025

== Qualification ==
For the women's long jump, the qualification period runs from 25 February 2024 until 23 February 2025. Athletes can qualify by achieving the entry standards of 6.80 m or by virtue of their World Athletics Ranking for the event. There is a target number of 18 athletes.

== Rounds ==
=== Qualification ===
The qualifying round was held on 7 March, starting at 11:42 (UTC+1) in the morning. Qualification rule: All athletes meeting the Qualification Standard of 6.65 m (Q) or at least 8 best performers (q) advance to the Final.

Results of the qualification round
Rank	Athlete	Nation	#1	#2	#3	Result	Notes	PB
1	Annik Kälin	Switzerland	x	6.77		6.77	Q, =SB	6.84
2	Larissa Iapichino	Italy	6.53	6.76		6.76	Q	6.97
3	Pauline Hondema	Netherlands	6.54	6.70		6.70	Q, =SB	6.76
4	Malaika Mihambo	Germany	6.68			6.68	Q	7.30
5	Milica Gardašević	Serbia	6.26	6.67		6.67	Q, SB	6.91
6	Mikaelle Assani	Germany	6.62	6.34	r	6.62	q	6.91
7	Fátima Diame	Spain	6.59	6.45	6.56	6.59	q =SB	6.82
8	Plamena Mitkova	Bulgaria	6.59	x	6.55	6.59	q	6.97
9	Anna Matuszewicz	Poland	x	6.52	6.17	6.52		6.71
10	Alice Hopkins	Great Britain	x	6.46	6.35	6.46		6.59
11	Nikola Horowska	Poland	6.23	6.42	6.34	6.42		6.61
12	Filippa Fotopoulou	Cyprus	x	6.41	6.33	6.41		6.79
13	Jogaile Petrokaité	Lithuania	x	6.20	6.29	6.29		6.76
14	Alina Rotaru-Kottmann	Romania	6.04	x	6.29	6.29		6.96
15	Irati Mitxelena	Spain	5.94	6.28	6.21	6.28		6.64
16	Petra Bánhidi-Farkas	Hungary	x	6.03	x	6.03		6.77
17	Yana Sargsyan	Armenia	5.84	5.83	x	5.84		6.19
18	Antriana Gkogka	Greece	x	2.18	x	2.18		6.55

=== Final ===
The final was held on 8 March, starting at 20:29 (UTC+1) in the evening.

Results of the final
Rank	Athlete	Nation	#1	#2	#3	#4	#5	#6	Result	Notes
1st place, gold medalist(s)	Larissa Iapichino	Italy	6.71	x	6.94	6.78	6.69	x	6.94	SB
2nd place, silver medalist(s)	Annik Kälin	Switzerland	6.90	6.85	6.68	x	x	5.30	6.90	NR
3rd place, bronze medalist(s)	Malaika Mihambo	Germany	6.45	x	x	–	6.65	6.88	6.88	
4	Milica Gardašević	Serbia	6.75	x	x	x	6.72	x	6.75	SB
5	Fátima Diame	Spain	x	6.73	x	6.64	6.50	6.73	6.73	SB
6	Plamena Mitkova	Bulgaria	6.37	6.63	x	6.56	6.59	6.63	6.63	
7	Pauline Hondema	Netherlands	x	x	x	6.50	6.43	x	6.50	
8	Mikaelle Assani	Germany	4.20	x	4.59	5.95	6.32	x	6.32	
