= 2026 European Athletics Championships – Women's long jump =

Women's long jump at the 2026 European Athletics Championships
- Venue: Alexander Stadium
- Location: Birmingham, United Kingdom
- Dates: 15 August 2026 (qualification); 16 August 2026 (final)
- Competitors: 30 (target)
- Winning time: 7.00

Medalists
gold medal	Larissa Iapichino	Italy
silver medal	Jazmin Sawyers	Great Britain
bronze medal	Hilary Kpatcha	France

The women's long jump at the 2026 European Athletics Championships took place over two rounds at the Alexander Stadium in Birmingham, United Kingdom, on 15 and 16 August 2026.

== Background ==
Records before the 2026 European Athletics Championships
Record	Athlete (nation)	Distance	Location	Date
World record	Galina Chistyakova (URS)	7.52 m	Leningrad, Soviet Union	11 June 1988
European record	Galina Chistyakova (URS)	7.52 m	Leningrad, Soviet Union	11 June 1988
Championship record	Heike Drechsler (GDR)	7.30 m	Split, Yugoslavia	28 August 1990
World leading	Tara Davis-Woodhall (USA)	7.20 m	Los Angeles, United States	14 June 2026
European leading	Larissa Iapichino (ITA)	7.12 m	Eugene, United States	4 July 2026

== Qualification ==
For the women's long jump, the qualification period was from 27 July 2025 to 26 July 2026. Athletes qualified by achieving the entry standard of 6.77 m or better, by wildcard for the 2024 European Athletics Champion, or by their position on the World Athletics Rankings for the event. The target number was 30 athletes.

Qualification standings per 31 July 2026
QP	CP	Country	Athlete	Status	Details
1	1	Germany	Malaika Mihambo	Qualified by Wild Card	Defending European Champion
2	1	Italy	Larissa Iapichino	Qualified by Entry Standard	7.12 - Hayward Field, Eugene, OR (USA) - 04 JUL 2026
3	1	France	Hilary Kpatcha	Qualified by Entry Standard	6.98 - Stadium Municipal, Albi (FRA) - 24 JUL 2026
4	1	Portugal	Agate de Sousa	Qualified by Entry Standard	6.97 - Gallur, Madrid (ESP) (i) - 06 FEB 2026
5	1	Sweden	Maja Åskag	Qualified by Entry Standard	6.89 - Sola Arena, Karlstad (SWE) - 08 JUL 2026
6	1	Spain	Tessy Ebosele	Qualified by Entry Standard	6.86 - Pistes d'atletisme Gaetà Huguet, Castellón (ESP) - 01 JUL 2026
7	2	France	Yanis David	Qualified by Entry Standard	6.86 - Stadium Municipal, Albi (FRA) - 24 JUL 2026
8	2	Spain	Fátima Diame	Qualified by Entry Standard	6.85 - Pistes d'atletisme Gaetà Huguet, Castellón (ESP) - 01 JUL 2026
9	1	Ukraine	Iryna Budzynska	Qualified by Entry Standard	6.82 - Tsirio Stadium, Limassol (CYP) - 29 MAY 2026
10	1	Romania	Alina Rotaru-Kottmann	Qualified by Entry Standard	6.81 - Panthessaliko Stadium, Volos (GRE) - 27 JUL 2025
11	3	France	Rogilia-Chriss Bissemo	Qualified by Entry Standard	6.80 - Stade Christian Plaziat, Pierre-Bénite (FRA) - 13 JUN 2026
12	1	Great Britain & N.I.	Jazmin Sawyers	Qualified by Entry Standard	6.80 - Sola Arena, Karlstad (SWE) - 08 JUL 2026
13	1	Cyprus	Filippa Fotopoulou	Qualified by Entry Standard	6.78 - Kifisia (GRE) - 22 MAY 2026
14	1	Hungary	Petra Bánhidi-Farkas	Qualified by Entry Standard	6.78 - Lantos Mihály Sportközpont, Budapest (HUN) - 31 MAY 2026
15	2	Romania	Ramona Elena Verman	Qualified by Entry Standard	6.78 - Panthessaliko Stadium, Volos (GRE) - 21 JUN 2026
16	3	Spain	Irati Mitxelena	Qualified by Entry Standard	6.77 - Altamira estadioa, Ordizia (ESP) - 04 JUL 2026
17	1	Netherlands	Pauline Hondema	Qualified by World Rankings	5th - 1225 points
18	1	Serbia	Milica Gardašević	Qualified by World Rankings	13th - 1209 points
19	2	Germany	Mikaelle Assani	Qualified by World Rankings	16th - 1194 points
20	2	Sweden	Ayla Hallberg Hossain	Qualified by World Rankings	18th - 1188 points
21	2	Great Britain & N.I.	Lucy Hadaway	Qualified by World Rankings	21st - 1177 points
reserve	4	Spain	Carmen Rosales	Qualified by World Rankings	22nd - 1176 points
22	3	Germany	Imke Daalmann	Qualified by World Rankings	24th - 1166 points
23	1	Greece	Antriana Gkogka	Qualified by World Rankings	25th - 1162 points
24	3	Great Britain & N.I.	Molly Palmer	Qualified by World Rankings	28th - 1153 points
25	2	Greece	Natalia Besi	Qualified by World Rankings	31st - 1142 points
26	1	Denmark	Ida Beiter Bomme	Qualified by World Rankings	32nd - 1140 points
27	3	Sweden	Tilde Johansson	Qualified by World Rankings	35th - 1138 points
28	1	Turkey	Yasemin Zehra Börekçi	Qualified by World Rankings	36th - 1138 points
29	1	Norway	Ida Andrea Breigan	Qualified by World Rankings	43rd - 1131 points
30	1	Estonia	Liisa-Maria Lusti	Qualified by World Rankings	44th - 1130 points
reserve	1	Ireland	Elizabeth Ndudi	Next best by World Rankings	46th - 1128 points
reserve	2	Italy	Arianna Battistella	Next best by World Rankings	48th - 1126 points
reserve	1	Slovenia	Maja Bedrač	Next best by World Rankings	53rd - 1122 points
reserve	1	Finland	Taika Koilahti	Next best by World Rankings	54th - 1121 points
reserve	1	Israel	Romi Tamir	Next best by World Rankings	55th - 1121 points
reserve	2	Norway	Miranda Lauvstad	Next best by World Rankings	65th - 1110 points
reserve	3	Italy	Greta Brugnolo	Next best by World Rankings	81st - 1089 points

== Schedule ==
Date	Time	Round
15 August 2026	11:50	Qualification.
16 August 2026	20:05	Final

All times are local times (UTC+1)

== Results ==
=== Qualification ===
The qualification round was held on 15 August 2026, at 11:50 in the morning. All athletes meeting the Qualification Standard (Q) of 6.80 m or at least 12 best performers (q) advanced to the final.

==== Group A ====
Place	Athlete	Nation	Round			Result	Notes
Place	Athlete	Nation	#1	#2	#3	Result	Notes
1	Agate de Sousa	Portugal	7.00 (+1.7 m/s)			7.00 m (+1.7 m/s)	Q, SB
2	Larissa Iapichino	Italy	6.94 (+2.2 m/s)			6.94 m (+2.2 m/s)	Q
3	Molly Palmer	Great Britain & N.I.	6.72 (+1.7 m/s)	6.27 (+2.0 m/s)	-	6.72 m (+1.7 m/s)	q, PB
4	Maja Åskag	Sweden	6.55 (+5.3 m/s)	6.66 (+1.9 m/s)	6.55 (+1.7 m/s)	6.66 m (+1.9 m/s)	q
5	Fátima Diame	Spain	6.44 (+1.0 m/s)	x	6.65 (+1.8 m/s)	6.65 m (+1.8 m/s)	q
6	Filippa Fotopoulou	Cyprus	6.60 (+2.3 m/s)	6.52 (+2.3 m/s)	6.33 (+1.9 m/s)	6.60 m (+2.3 m/s)	
7	Alina Rotaru-Kottmann	Romania	6.45 (+2.5 m/s)	6.57 (+3.8 m/s)	6.55 (+1.6 m/s)	6.57 m (+3.8 m/s)	
8	Mikaelle Assani	Germany	x	6.52 (+2.7 m/s)	6.12 (+2.7 m/s)	6.52 m (+2.7 m/s)	
9	Milica Gardašević	Serbia	6.49 (+2.4 m/s)	6.50 (+1.7 m/s)	x	6.50 m (+1.7 m/s)	
10	Carmen Rosales	Spain	x	x	6.38 (+3.0 m/s)	6.38 m (+3.0 m/s)	
11	Rogilia-Chriss Bissemo	France	6.33 (+2.4 m/s)	6.26 (+0.6 m/s)	x	6.33 m (+2.4 m/s)	
12	Yasemin Zehra Börekçi	Turkey	6.20 (+1.8 m/s)	x	x	6.20 m (+1.8 m/s)	
—	Natalia Besi	Greece	x	x	x	NM	
—	Iryna Budzynska	Ukraine	x	x	x	NM	
—	Liisa-Maria Lusti	Estonia	x	x	x	NM	

==== Group B ====
Place	Athlete	Nation	Round			Result	Notes
Place	Athlete	Nation	#1	#2	#3	Result	Notes
1	Malaika Mihambo	Germany	6.37 (+2.5 m/s)	x	7.10 (+3.3 m/s)	7.10 m (+3.3 m/s)	Q
2	Jazmin Sawyers	Great Britain & N.I.	6.90 (+2.5 m/s)			6.90 m (+2.5 m/s)	Q
3	Hilary Kpatcha	France	6.88 (+2.2 m/s)			6.88 m (+2.2 m/s)	Q
4	Ramona Elena Verman	Romania	6.54 (+3.0 m/s)	x	6.81 (+2.8 m/s)	6.81 m (+2.8 m/s)	Q
5	Pauline Hondema	Netherlands	6.75 (+2.6 m/s)	x	6.59 (+2.7 m/s)	6.75 m (+2.6 m/s)	q
6	Ayla Hallberg Hossain	Sweden	x	x	6.66 (+1.7 m/s)	6.66 m (+1.7 m/s)	q
7	Yanis David	France	6.61 (+1.1 m/s)	x	6.44 (+2.8 m/s)	6.61 m (+1.1 m/s)	q
8	Ida Beiter Bomme	Denmark	6.57 (+2.2 m/s)	x	x	6.57 m (+2.2 m/s)	
9	Petra Bánhidi-Farkas	Hungary	6.23 (+0.9 m/s)	x	6.55 (+3.0 m/s)	6.55 m (+3.0 m/s)	
10	Tessy Ebosele	Spain	6.32 (+2.3 m/s)	6.54 (+1.3 m/s)	6.22 (+3.2 m/s)	6.54 m (+1.3 m/s)	
11	Tilde Johansson	Sweden	x	x	6.47 (+1.4 m/s)	6.47 m (+1.4 m/s)	
12	Lucy Hadaway	Great Britain & N.I.	x	6.29 (+1.8 m/s)	6.33 (+0.8 m/s)	6.33 m (+0.8 m/s)	
13	Antriana Gkogka	Greece	4.75 (+0.9 m/s)	x	6.27 (+1.6 m/s)	6.27 m (+1.6 m/s)	
—	Imke Daalmann	Germany	x	x	x	NM	

=== Final ===
The final was held on 16 August 2026, at 20:05 in the evening.

Place	Athlete	Nation	Round						Result	Notes
Place	Athlete	Nation	#1	#2	#3	#4	#5	#6	Result	Notes
1st place, gold medalist(s)	Larissa Iapichino	Italy	7.00 (+2.1 m/s)	x (+2.6 m/s)	6.93 (+3.6 m/s)	6.71 (+1.2 m/s)	6.80 (+1.8 m/s)	5.94 (+2.7 m/s)	7.00 m (+2.1 m/s)	
2nd place, silver medalist(s)	Jazmin Sawyers	Great Britain & N.I.	6.95 (+2.5 m/s)	6.96 (+1.3 m/s)	x	6.99 (+2.2 m/s)	x	6.92 (+1.6 m/s)	6.99 m (+2.2 m/s)	SB
3rd place, bronze medalist(s)	Hilary Kpatcha	France	6.83 (+1.7 m/s)	6.98 (+2.5 m/s)	x	6.85 (+0.9 m/s)	6.79 (+1.5 m/s)	x	6.98 m (−1.7 m/s)	
4	Agate de Sousa	Portugal	6.84 (+2.3 m/s)	x	6.96 (+2.3 m/s)	x	6.73 (+1.8 m/s)	6.89 (+1.6 m/s)	6.96 m (+2.3 m/s)	
5	Malaika Mihambo	Germany	6.94 (+3.3 m/s)	x	x	x	6.70 (+1.6 m/s)	6.86 (+1.5 m/s)	6.94 m (+3.3 m/s)	
6	Fátima Diame	Spain	6.66 (+2.2 m/s)	6.80 (+2.3 m/s)	6.66 (+0.9 m/s)	6.76 (+2.2 m/s)	5.26 (+0.9 m/s)	x	6.80 m (+2.3 m/s)	
7	Maja Åskag	Sweden	6.66 (+1.9 m/s)	6.69 (+1.8 m/s)	6.57 (+1.4 m/s)	x	6.40 (+2.2 m/s)	6.51 (+2.1 m/s)	6.69 m (+1.8 m/s)	
8	Filippa Fotopoulou	Cyprus	6.67 (+1.5 m/s)	6.54 (+1.9 m/s)	x	6.45 (+2.0 m/s)	6.47 (+1.4 m/s)	6.46 (+0.7 m/s)	6.67 (+1.5 m/s)	
9	Molly Palmer	Great Britain & N.I.	6.29 (+2.7 m/s)	6.54 (+2.8 m/s)	6.34 (+2.1 m/s)				6.54 m (+2.8 m/s)	
10	Ramona Elena Verman	Romania	6.51 (+2.7 m/s)	5.34 (+1.6 m/s)	x				6.51 (+2.7 m/s)	
11	Pauline Hondema	Netherlands	6.47 (+2.2 m/s)	6.41 (+2.3 m/s)	6.41 (+1.3 m/s)				6.47 m (+2.2 m/s)	
—	Yanis David	France	x	r					NM	
