= 2025 European Athletics U23 Championships – Women's long jump =

Women's long jump at the 2025 European Athletics U23 Championships
- Venue: Fana Stadion
- Location: Bergen, Norway
- Dates: 19 July (qualification); 20 July (final)
- Competitors: 18 from 13 nations
- Winning distance: 6.60 m PB

Medalists
| gold medal | Ramona Verman | Romania |
| silver medal | Samira Attermeyer | Germany |
| bronze medal | Ida Andrea Breigan | Norway |

The women's long jump event at the 2025 European Athletics U23 Championships was held in Bergen, Norway, at Fana Stadion on 19 and 20 July.

== Records ==
Prior to the competition, the records were as follows:

| Record | Athlete (nation) | Distance (m) | Location | Date |
|---|---|---|---|---|
| European U23 record | Heike Drechsler (GDR) | 7.45 m | Dresden, East Germany | 3 July 1986 |
| Championship U23 record | Darya Klishina (RUS) | 7.05 m | Ostrava, Czech Republic | 17 July 2011 |

== Results ==
=== Qualification ===
All athletes over 6.50 m (Q) or at least the 12 best performers (q) advance to the final.

==== Group A ====
| Place | Athlete | Nation | #1 | #2 | #3 | Result | Notes |
|---|---|---|---|---|---|---|---|
| 1 | Samira Attermeyer | Germany | 6.64 m (+2.6 m/s) | | | 6.64 m (+2.6 m/s) | Q |
| 2 | Plamena Mitkova | Bulgaria | 6.57 (+2.0 m/s) | | | 6.57 m (+2.0 m/s) | Q |
| 3 | Libby Buder | Germany | 6.26 (+0.4 m/s) | x | 6.50 (+0.5 m/s) | 6.50 m (+0.5 m/s) | Q, PB |
| 4 | Liisa-Maria Lusti | Estonia | 6.38 (+1.3 m/s) | x | x | 6.38 m (+1.3 m/s) | q |
| 5 | Anna Matuszewicz | Poland | 6.26 (+2.0 m/s) | 6.22 (+1.5 m/s) | 6.36 (+1.1 m/s) | 6.36 m (+1.1 m/s) | q |
| 6 | Antriana Gkogka | Greece | 6.28 (−0.1 m/s) | x | x | 6.28 m (−0.1 m/s) | q |
| 7 | Miranda Lauvstad | Norway | x | 6.24 (+1.6 m/s) | 6.14 (+1.9 m/s) | 6.24 m (+1.6 m/s) | q |
| 8 | Alina Listunova | Ukraine | 6.05 (−0.4 m/s) | x | 6.13 (+0.9 m/s) | 6.13 m (+0.9 m/s) | q |
| 9 | Giulia Riccardi | Italy | 6.12 (+2.6 m/s) | 5.91 (+1.0 m/s) | 6.10 (+1.4 m/s) | 6.12 m (+2.6 m/s) | |
| 10 | Nikolia Poirazidi | Greece | 6.09 (+1.5 m/s) | 5.92 (+2.4 m/s) | 5.93 (+1.2 m/s) | 6.09 m (+1.5 m/s) | |

==== Group B ====
| Place | Athlete | Nation | #1 | #2 | #3 | Result | Notes |
|---|---|---|---|---|---|---|---|
| 1 | Ida Andrea Breigan | Norway | 6.43 (+2.2 m/s) | 6.36 (+1.1 m/s) | x | 6.43 m (+2.2 m/s) | q |
| 2 | Evelyn Yankey | Spain | 6.43 (+2.1 m/s) | 6.35 (+1.6 m/s) | x | 6.43 m (+2.1 m/s) | q |
| 3 | Ramona Verman | Romania | 6.43 (+1.8 m/s) | x | 6.31 (±0.0 m/s) | 6.43 m (+1.8 m/s) | q |
| 4 | Finja Köchling | Germany | 6.05 (+2.0 m/s) | 6.18 (+1.9 m/s) | 6.02 (+1.0 m/s) | 6.18 m (+1.9 m/s) | q |
| 5 | Georgina Scoot | Great Britain | 6.10 (+1.0 m/s) | x | x | 6.10 m (+1.0 m/s) | |
| 6 | Katharina Gråman | Sweden | 6.07 (−0.4 m/s) | 5.96 (+0.6 m/s) | 5.95 (+1.3 m/s) | 6.07 m (−0.4 m/s) | |
| 7 | Rachela Pace | Malta | 5.85 (+2.8 m/s) | 5.90 (+1.3 m/s) | 6.06 (+1.2 m/s) | 6.06 m (+1.2 m/s) | |
| 8 | Julia Adamczyk | Poland | 6.05 (+0.4 m/s) | x | 5.56 (+0.3 m/s) | 6.05 m (+0.4 m/s) | |

=== Final ===
| Place | Athlete | Nation | #1 | #2 | #3 | #4 | #5 | #6 | Result | Notes |
|---|---|---|---|---|---|---|---|---|---|---|
| 1st place, gold medalist(s) | Ramona Verman | Romania | 6.38 (±0.0 m/s) | 6.56 (−1.3 m/s) | 6.58 (−0.7 m/s) | 6.34 (−0.1 m/s) | 6.60 (±0.0 m/s) | r | 6.60 m (±0.0 m/s) | PB |
| 2nd place, silver medalist(s) | Samira Attermeyer | Germany | 6.02 (−1.4 m/s) | 6.47 (+1.2 m/s) | 6.58 (−0.7 m/s) | 6.22 (−0.3 m/s) | x | 6.36 (±0.0 m/s) | 6.58 m (−0.7 m/s) | PB |
| 3rd place, bronze medalist(s) | Ida Andrea Breigan | Norway | 6.32 (−0.7 m/s) | x | 6.40 (+1.1 m/s) | 6.58 (+0.1 m/s) | 6.34 (+0.4 m/s) | 6.14 (+0.7 m/s) | 6.58 m (+0.1 m/s) | |
| 4 | Libby Buder | Germany | x | 6.43 (+0.7 m/s) | 6.37 (−0.5 m/s) | 6.31 (−0.3 m/s) | 6.56 (+0.1 m/s) | 6.53 (−0.4 m/s) | 6.56 m (+0.1 m/s) | PB |
| 5 | Anna Matuszewicz | Poland | 6.01 (−0.5 m/s) | 6.41 (−0.7 m/s) | 6.11 (−2.1 m/s) | 6.36 (−0.6 m/s) | x | 6.45 (+0.4 m/s) | 6.45 m (+0.4 m/s) | |
| 6 | Liisa-Maria Lusti | Estonia | 6.22 (+0.6 m/s) | 6.08 (−0.6 m/s) | 6.37 (−0.9 m/s) | 6.27 (−0.1 m/s) | 6.45 (−0.4 m/s) | 6.39 (−0.2 m/s) | 6.45 m (−0.4 m/s) | |
| 7 | Plamena Mitkova | Bulgaria | 6.11 (−1.0 m/s) | 6.37 (+0.9 m/s) | x | 5.95 (−0.8 m/s) | 6.42 (−1.1 m/s) | 6.38 (+0.2 m/s) | 6.42 m (−1.1 m/s) | |
| 8 | Evelyn Yankey | Spain | x | 6.20 (−1.0 m/s) | 6.25 (−0.2 m/s) | x | x | 6.07 (+1.1 m/s) | 6.25 m (−0.2 m/s) | |
| 9 | Finja Köchling | Germany | 4.16 (+1.3 m/s) | 6.11 (+0.6 m/s) | 6.00 (+0.6 m/s) | | | | 6.11 m (+0.6 m/s) | |
| 10 | Miranda Lauvstad | Norway | 6.03 (−0.3 m/s) | 6.09 (−0.8 m/s) | 6.06 (−0.7 m/s) | | | | 6.09 m (−0.8 m/s) | |
| 11 | Antriana Gkogka | Greece | 6.02 (−0.9 m/s) | 6.00 (−0.1 m/s) | 6.08 (+0.3 m/s) | | | | 6.08 m (+0.3 m/s) | |
| 12 | Alina Listunova | Ukraine | 5.66 (−0.3 m/s) | 5.95 (+0.7 m/s) | 5.85 (−1.3 m/s) | | | | 5.95 m (+0.7 m/s) | |
