= 2022 World Athletics U20 Championships – Women's long jump =

Women's long jump at the 2022 World Athletics U20 Championships
- Venue: Estadio Olímpico Pascual Guerrero
- Dates: 3 August (qualification); 5 August (final)
- Competitors: 32 from 25 nations
- Winning distance: 6.66

Medalists
gold medal	Plamena Mitkova	Bulgaria
silver medal	Natalia Linares	Colombia
bronze medal	Marta Armani	Italy

The women's long jump at the 2022 World Athletics U20 Championships was held at the Estadio Olímpico Pascual Guerrero on 3 and 5 August.

38 athletes from 29 countries were entered to the competition, however 32 athletes from 25 countries were on the final startlist.

== Records ==
U20 standing records prior to the 2022 World Athletics U20 Championships were as follows:

Record	Athlete & Nationality	Mark	Location	Date
World U20 Record	Heike Drechsler (GDR)	7.14	Bratislava, Czechoslovakia	4 June 1983
Championship Record	Fiona May (GBR)	6.82	Sudbury, Canada	30 July 1988
World U20 Leading	Helena Börner (GER)	6.73	Garbsen, Germany	22 May 2022

== Results ==
=== Qualification ===
The qualification round took place on 3 August, in two groups, both starting at 09:45. Athletes attaining a mark of at least 6.40 metres ( Q ) or at least the 12 best performers ( q ) qualified for the final.

Rank	Group	Name	Nationality	Round			Mark	Notes
Rank	Group	Name	Nationality	1	2	3	Mark	Notes
1	A	Evelyn Yankey	Spain	6.05	5.97	6.34	6.34	q
2	B	Marta Amouhin Amani	Italy	x	6.32	6.24	6.32	q
3	B	Natalia Linares	Colombia	6.31	5.93	5.68	6.31	q
4	A	Molly Palmer	Great Britain	x	6.31	x	6.31	q, PB
5	A	Plamena Mitkova	Bulgaria	6.29	x	x	6.29	q
6	B	Anna Matuszewicz	Poland	6.22	6.22	x	6.22	q
7	B	Libby Buder	Germany	6.14	6.15	6.21	6.21	q
8	A	Tabea Eitel	Germany	6.21	6.10	6.05	6.21	q
9	A	Emelia Surch	Australia	5.87	6.20	4.73	6.20	q, PB
10	A	Karmen Fouché	South Africa	6.11	6.08	6.15	6.15	q
11	B	Ramona Elena Verman	Romania	5.90	6.12	6.13	6.13	q
12	B	Lāsma Zemīte	Latvia	6.08	x	6.13	6.13	q
13	A	Elena Debelic	Switzerland	4.58	6.03	6.10	6.10	
14	A	Brina Likar	Slovenia	6.10	3.95	5.91	6.10	
15	A	Vanessa Sena	Brazil	6.08	5.84	5.92	6.08	
16	A	Katharina Gråman	Sweden	5.88	6.07	x	6.07	
17	B	Nemata Nikiema	Burkina Faso	x	6.05	5.93	6.05	
18	A	Anastassiya Rypakova	Kazakhstan	5.97	5.96	6.04	6.04	
19	B	Renáta Vodnyánszká	Slovakia	5.81	6.03	5.86	6.03	
20	A	Alyssa Banales	United States	5.88	5.67	6.02	6.02	
21	A	Ion Kondo	Japan	6.01	x	5.92	6.01	
22	B	Mikaela Lyri	Greece	4.12	5.60	6.01	6.01	
23	B	Joane Gerber	South Africa	x	6.01	x	6.01	
24	A	Anna Rugowska	Poland	5.87	5.57	5.97	5.97	
25	B	India Alix	United States	x	5.93	5.94	5.94	
26	A	Konstantina Bertsima	Greece	5.89	x	5.69	5.89	
27	B	Izzy Goudros	Canada	5.84	5.75	5.74	5.84	
28	B	Katie Gunn	Australia	5.70	5.56	5.80	5.80	
29	A	Anna Panenko	Estonia	5.70	x	x	5.70	
30	B	Winny Chepngetich Bii	Kenya	x	x	5.65	5.65	
31	B	Plamena Chakarova	Bulgaria	x	5.53	5.44	5.53	
	B	Shaili Singh	India	DNS				

=== Final ===
The final was started at 15:52 on 5 August.

Rank	Name	Nationality	Round						Mark	Notes
Rank	Name	Nationality	1	2	3	4	5	6	Mark	Notes
1st place, gold medalist(s)	Plamena Mitkova	Bulgaria	6.19	X	6.66	6.57	x	x	6.66	PB
2nd place, silver medalist(s)	Natalia Linares	Colombia	5.82	6.07	6.33	6.59	6.40	6.52	6.59	
3rd place, bronze medalist(s)	Marta Amouhin Amani	Italy	6.24	6.21	x	x	6.22	6.52	6.52	PB
4	Emelia Surch	Australia	6.08	6.15	6.18	6.17	6.45	x	6.45	PB
5	Anna Matuszewicz	Poland	6.04	6.25	6.30	6.09	6.12	6.31	6.31	
6	Karmen Fouché	South Africa	x	6.07	6.19	6.31	6.17	6.15	6.31	PB
7	Evelyn Yankey	Spain	6.16	6.04	6.21	6.15	6.01	5.99	6.21	
8	Tabea Eitel	Germany	5.97	6.18	6.04	6.00	x	5.98	6.18	
9	Libby Buder	Germany	5.94	6.06	6.16				6.16	
10	Lāsma Zemīte	Latvia	6.12	5.95	6.02				6.12	
11	Molly Palmer	Great Britain	x	6.09	x				6.09	
12	Ramona Elena Verman	Romania	6.02	5.80	x				6.02	
