= Nia Robinson =

Jamaican long jumper (born 2001)

Personal information
- Full name: Nia Njeri Robinson
- Born: 8 November 2001 (age 25) Montego Bay, Jamaica
- Height: 180 cm (5 ft 11 in)

Sport
- Country: Jamaica
- Sport: Athletics
- Events: Long jump, Triple jump

Achievements and titles
- Personal bests: Triple jump: 13.41m (Fayetteville, 2025); Long jump: 6.82m (Fayetteville, 2026); High jump: 1.80m (Garden City, 2022)

Nia Njeri Robinson (born 8 November 2001) is a Jamaican long jumper. She placed second at the Jamaican Athletics Championships in 2025.

== Biography ==
Robinson was born Montego Bay, St. James, and educated at Rusea's High School in Jamaica. She later attended Barton Community College, the University of South Florida and the University of Arkansas in the United States, where she competed in triple jump, long jump and high jump as a collegiate athlete.

In February 2023, Robinson placed second at the American Athletics Conference Indoors Championships in Birmingham, Alabama whilst competing for the University of South Florida. She jumped 6.28m, to go under the previous meeting record as she finished runner-up to Funminiyi Olajide.

Robinson placed second to Ackelia Smith at the 2025 Jamaican Athletics Championships in Kingston, with a jump of 6.52 metres in June 2025. Robinson placed sixth representing Jamaica in the long jump at the 2025 NACAC Championships in The Bahamas on 15 August 2025, with a jump of 6.36 metres.

Robinson opened her 2026 indoor season with a win in the women's long jump with 6.46m in the final round of the Tampere Indoor Meeting, in Finland, in January 2026. Robinson jumped a personal best of 6.82 m in the women's long jump at the Tyson Invitational in February 2026, in Arkansas. She placed fifth in the long jump with a best mark of 6.75 metres representing Jamaica at the 2026 World Athletics Indoor Championships in Toruń, Poland. Robinson had a third-place finish behind Monae' Nichols and Jazmin Sawyers at the Paavo Nurmi Games in Finland on 3 June. On 7 June, she also placed third at the 2026 Diamond League event in Stockholm. She was named in the Jamaica team for the long jump at the 2026 Commonwealth Games in Glasgow, Scotland.
