= 2026 World Athletics Indoor Championships – Women's long jump =

Women's long jump at the 2026 World Athletics Indoor Championships
- Venue: Kujawsko-Pomorska Arena Toruń
- Location: Toruń, Poland
- Dates: 22 March
- Competitors: 16 from 14 nations
- Winning mark: 6.92 m

Medalists
gold medal	Agate de Sousa	Portugal
silver medal	Larissa Iapichino	Italy
bronze medal	Natalia Linares	Colombia

The women's long jump at the 2026 World Athletics Indoor Championships took place on the short track of the Kujawsko-Pomorska Arena Toruń in Toruń, Poland, on 22 March 2026. This was the 22nd time the event was contested at the World Athletics Indoor Championships. Athletes could qualify by achieving the entry standard or by their World Athletics Ranking in the event.

== Background ==
The women's long jump was contested 21 times before 2026, at every previous edition of the World Athletics Indoor Championships.

Records before the 2026 World Athletics Indoor Championships
Record	Athlete (nation)	Distance (m)	Location	Date
World record	Galina Chistyakova (URS)	7.52	Leningrad, Soviet Union	11 June 1988
Championship record	Brittney Reese (USA)	7.23	Istanbul, Turkey	11 March 2012
2026 World Lead	Agate de Sousa (POR)	6.97	Madrid, Spain	11 February 2026

== Qualification ==
For the women's long jump, the qualification period ran from 1 November 2025 until 8 March 2026. Athletes could qualify by achieving the entry standard of 6.75 m. Athletes could also qualify by virtue of their World Athletics Ranking for the event or by virtue of their World Athletics Indoor Tour wildcard. There is a target number of 16 athletes.

== Results ==
=== Final ===
The final was held on 22 March, starting at 10:30 (UTC+1) in the morning.

Results of the final
Place	Athlete	Nation	#1	#2	#3	#4	#5	#6	Result	Notes
1st place, gold medalist(s)	Agate de Sousa	Portugal	6.73	x	6.82	6.81	6.92	6.65	6.92	
2nd place, silver medalist(s)	Larissa Iapichino	Italy	6.49	6.69	x	6.66	6.84	6.87	6.87	
3rd place, bronze medalist(s)	Natalia Linares	Colombia	6.79	6.80	6.58	6.65	6.61	6.64	6.80	NR
4	Khaddi Sagnia	Sweden	6.78	6.75	6.76	6.70	x	6.48	6.78	SB
5	Nia Robinson	Jamaica	6.50	6.53	6.75	x	x	x	6.75	
6	Ramona Elena Verman	Romania	6.60	6.61	6.58	6.57	6.72	6.38	6.72	PB
7	Jasmine Moore	United States	6.70	x	x	x	6.52		6.70	
8	Monae' Nichols	United States	6.54	6.66	x	6.52	x		6.66	
9	Anna Matuszewicz	Poland	x	6.08	6.50	6.33			6.50	
10	Molly Palmer	Great Britain	x	x	6.49	6.33			6.49	
11	Alina Rotaru-Kottmann	Romania	x	6.42	6.45				6.45	
12	Irati Mitxelena	Spain	6.43	6.30	6.36				6.43	
13	Milica Gardašević	Serbia	6.36	6.27	6.43				6.43	
14	Alysbeth Felix Boyer	Puerto Rico	x	x	6.37				6.37	
15	Tyra Gittens	Trinidad and Tobago	6.28	6.29	6.32				6.32	
16	Annik Kälin	Switzerland	6.31	x	x				6.31	
