= Harry Hughes (javelin thrower) =

British javelin thrower

Personal information
- Nationality: British (English)
- Born: 26 September 1997 (age 28) Bury St Edmunds, England
- Home town: Bury St Edmunds, Suffolk
- Education: University of Essex

Sport
- Sport: Athletics
- Event: Javelin throw
- Club: West Suffolk Athletic Club
- Coached by: Mike McNeill; Mark Roberson

Achievements and titles
- World finals: 2016 World U20s; • Javelin throw, 7th
- National finals: 2016 British U20s; • Javelin throw, 1st; 2017 British Champs; • Javelin throw, 6th; 2019 British Champs; • Javelin throw, 1st
- Personal bests: JT: 80.32m (2019); JT (700g): 72.22m (2013)
Medal record
Men's athletics
Representing Great Britain
U18 World School Championships
Bronze medal – third place	2013 Sokolov	Javelin throw

Harry Hughes (born 26 September 1997) is a British javelin thrower. He was the 2019 British Athletics Championships winner with a throw of 75.11 metres.

== Biography ==
Hughes is from Bury St Edmunds. He was a standout athlete from a young age, as he threw the senior weight javelin 62.30 metres at age 15 on his first recorded attempt. He was the 2013 English Schools and Schools International Athletic Board under-17 champion, and at the 2013 World School Athletics Championship he won the bronze medal in the 700-gram javelin with a distance of 64.54 m. By 2014, he had achieved the number 2 mark on the all-time national under-17 rankings, behind David Parker.

At the 2016 World U20 Championships in Athletics, Hughes represented his country in the javelin. He threw 74.30 m in qualification, but he was not able to match that mark in the final, throwing 72.22 metres for 7th place behind Neeraj Chopra's world under-20 record winning mark.

After finishing 7th at the 2017 British Athletics Championships, Hughes missed the entire 2018 season due to injury. He made his second senior national finals in 2019. Coming off a left heel injury that saw him miss the 2019 European Athletics U23 Championships, he threw 75.11 metres at the 2019 British Athletics Championships to win his first national title.

Before his injury, Hughes' 2019 season best of 80.32 metres was the farthest throw by a British athlete since 2012. In 2020, Hughes' injury that caused him to miss the 2018 season came back and required surgery to fix. To fund the surgery which placed two metal screws in his elbow, he successfully crowdfunded £5000 via GoFundMe.

Hughes competes for the West Suffolk Athletic Club and is coached by 1986 World U20 Championships silver medallist Mark Roberson.

== Statistics ==
=== Personal bests ===
Event	Mark	Place	Competition	Venue	Date
Javelin throw	80.32 m	1st place, gold medalist(s)	Loughborough International	Loughborough, United Kingdom	19 May 2019
Javelin throw (700 g)	72.22 m	1st place, gold medalist(s)	Cambridge Eastern Young Athletes' League	Cambridge, United Kingdom	4 August 2013
