= 2019 European Athletics U23 Championships – Women's long jump =

The women's long jump event at the 2019 European Athletics U23 Championships was held in Gävle, Sweden, at Gavlehof Stadium Park on 13 and 14 July.

== Medalists ==
Gold	Silver	Bronze
Hilary Kpatcha; France	Petra Farkas; Hungary	Milica Gardašević; Serbia

== Results ==
=== Qualification ===
Qualification rule: 6.40 (Q) or the 12 best results (q) qualified for the final.

Rank	Group	Name	Nationality	#1	#2	#3	Results	Notes
1	A	Hilary Kpatcha	France	6.81			6.81	Q, PB
2	A	Merle Homeier	Germany	6.52w			6.52w	Q
3	B	Taika Koilahti	Finland	6.01	6.48	6.24	6.48	Q
4	A	Petra Farkas	Hungary	6.39	6.38	6.36	6.39	q
5	A	Alice Hopkins	Great Britain	6.31w	x	x	6.31w	q
6	B	Milica Gardašević	Serbia	6.06	6.18	6.25	6.25	q
7	A	Irati Mitxelena	Spain	5.96	6.10	6.18	6.18	q
8	A	Hanne Maudens	Belgium	6.17	6.07	x	6.17	q
9	A	Kaiza Karlén	Sweden	6.00	6.17	x	6.17	q
10	A	Chiara Proverbio	Italy	5.76	6.12	6.16	6.16	q
11	B	Jessica Barreira	Portugal	6.07	6.03	6.10	6.10	q
12	A	Sara Lukić	Serbia	5.98	6.05	6.06	6.06	q
13	B	Diána Lesti	Hungary	x	5.79	6.05	6.05	
14	B	Tuğba Danışmaz	Turkey	5.97	6.03	5.92	6.03	
15	B	Amanda Hansson	Sweden	x	6.01	5.92	6.01	
16	B	Yevheniya Horbatyuk	Ukraine	x	5.64	6.01	6.01	
17	B	Eleni Koutsaliari	Greece	5.72	5.74	5.98	5.98	
18	A	Adéla Záhorová	Czech Republic	5.71	x	5.98	5.98	
19	A	Kreete Verlin	Estonia	5.85	5.94	5.81	5.94	
20	B	Līga Vecbērza	Latvia	5.68w	5.88	5.83	5.88	PB
21	B	Yanis David	France	4.78	5.82	5.81	5.82	
22	B	Claire Azzopardi	Malta	x	5.73	5.36	5.73	
	A	Georgiana Iuliana Anitei	Romania				DNS	

=== Final ===
Rank	Name	Nationality	#1	#2	#3	#4	#5	#6	Result	Notes
1st place, gold medalist(s)	Hilary Kpatcha	France	6.73	6.65	6.59	6.46	6.39	x	6.73	
2nd place, silver medalist(s)	Petra Farkas	Hungary	6.35	6.55	6.34	x	6.32	x	6.55	PB
3rd place, bronze medalist(s)	Milica Gardašević	Serbia	x	x	6.21	6.39	6.43	x	6.43	
4	Merle Homeier	Germany	6.40w	x	6.08w	6.32	6.24	6.24w	6.40w	
5	Kaiza Karlén	Sweden	x	x	6.21w	5.96	6.33	5.96	6.33	
6	Irati Mitxelena	Spain	6.25w	6.20	x	6.27	x	6.13	6.27	
7	Alice Hopkins	Great Britain	6.12w	x	5.91	x	5.81	6.00	6.12w	
8	Jessica Barreira	Portugal	6.03w	6.10	5.96	x	5.84	x	6.10	
9	Hanne Maudens	Belgium	6.06w	6.09w	5.72				6.09w	
10	Sara Lukić	Serbia	6.04	5.95	5.85w				6.04	
11	Chiara Proverbio	Italy	x	5.55	5.87				5.87	
	Taika Koilahti	Finland	x	x	x				NM	
