= 2016 IAAF World U20 Championships – Women's long jump =

The women's long jump event at the 2016 IAAF World U20 Championships was held at Zdzisław Krzyszkowiak Stadium on 21 and 22 July.

== Medalists ==
Gold	Yanis David; France
Silver	Sophie Weissenberg; Germany
Bronze	Hilary Kpatcha; France

== Records ==
Standing records prior to the 2016 IAAF World U20 Championships in Athletics
World Junior Record	Heike Drechsler (GDR)	7.14	Bratislava, Czechoslovakia	4 June 1983
Championship Record	Fiona May (GBR)	6.88	Sudbury, Canada	30 July 1988
World Junior Leading	Kate Hall (USA)	6.53	Eugene, United States	1 July 2016

== Results ==
=== Qualification ===
Qualification: 6.25 (Q) or at least 12 best performers (q) qualified for the final.

Rank	Group	Name	Nationality	#1	#2	#3	Result	Note
1	B	Sophie Weissenberg	Germany	6.21	6.34		6.34	Q
2	B	Hilary Kpatcha	France	5.95	5.99	6.32	6.32	Q, PB
3	A	Kaiza Karlén	Sweden	6.21	6.29		6.29	Q, PB
4	B	Chen Liwen	China	6.05	6.08	6.28w	6.28w	Q
5	A	Anna Bühler	Germany	6.20	6.10	6.25	6.25	Q
6	A	Jessicca Noble	Jamaica	6.22	5.75	6.01	6.22	q
7	A	Yanis David	France	6.04	6.15	6.18	6.18	q
8	A	Eszter Bajnok	Hungary	x	6.01	6.18	6.18	q
9	B	Parinya Chuaimaroeng	Thailand	5.98	6.17	5.99	6.17	q
10	A	Bria Matthews	United States	5.79	5.92	6.13	6.13	q
11	B	Samiyah Samuels	United States	6.08	6.03	x	6.08	q
12	A	Milica Gardašević	Serbia	5.54	5.74	5.85	5.85	q
13	B	Diana Ana Maria Ion	Romania	5.71	5.70	5.76	5.76	
14	B	Viyaleta Skvartsova	Belarus	x	x	5.52	5.52	
15	B	Martina Miroska	Macedonia	5.27	x	5.48	5.48	
	A	Chantoba Bright	Guyana				DNS	

=== Final ===
Rank	Name	Nationality	#1	#2	#3	#4	Result	Note
1st place, gold medalist(s)	Yanis David	France	6.42	6.29	x	x	6.42	
2nd place, silver medalist(s)	Sophie Weissenberg	Germany	6.40	6.30	x	5.96	6.40	
3rd place, bronze medalist(s)	Hilary Kpatcha	France	6.26	6.33	5.98	x	6.33	PB
4	Kaiza Karlén	Sweden	x	6.02	6.25	5.86	6.25	
5	Bria Matthews	United States	5.95	6.24	6.07	6.22	6.24	
6	Anna Bühler	Germany	5.99	6.21	6.18	5.89	6.21	
7	Eszter Bajnok	Hungary	6.13	x	6.16		6.16	
8	Samiyah Samuels	United States	5.86	6.08	6.01		6.08	
9	Parinya Chuaimaroeng	Thailand	6.07	5.88	5.89		6.07	
10	Chen Liwen	China	5.67	6.01	6.05		6.05	
11	Milica Gardašević	Serbia	x	5.95	5.95		5.95	
12	Jessicca Noble	Jamaica	5.79	5.82	5.74		5.82	
