= Arabella Wilson =

British hurdler (born 2006)

Personal information
- Born: 3 October 2006 (age 19)

Sport
- Sport: Athletics
- Event(s): Hurdles, Heptathlon

Achievements and titles
- Personal best(s): 200m: 24.40 (Derby, 2025); 400m: 54.69 (London, 2025); 400mH: 57.34 (Tampere, 2025)

Arabella Wilson (born 3 October 2006) is a British hurdler and multi-event athlete. She placed third in the 400 metres hurdles at the 2026 UK Athletics Championships.

== Biography ==
From Guildford, Surrey, Wilson was part of the Young Athletes Club and represented Surrey at county level as a junior athlete, and also became a member of Winchester and District Athletics Club. A multi-event athlete as well as a hurdler, she was selected for the heptathlon at the 2023 Commonwealth Youth Games in Trinidad and Tobago but had to withdraw due to a stress fracture. Wilson became the first female athlete to win all six long hurdles titles across English Schools' Athletics Championships the and SIAB and holds the fastest 400m hurdles time ever recorded by a British 15-year-old. She committed to attend Duke University in the United States in 2025.

Wilson broke the British under-20 300m hurdles record in 2025 with 41.05 seconds. She set a personal best of 57.98 seconds for the 400 metres hurdles in Mannheim, Germany, in June 2025. She won the England Athletics U20 Championships title over 400 metres hurdles with a personal best time of 57.49 seconds in July 2025. She was named in the British team for the 400 metres hurdles at the 2025 European Athletics U20 Championships in Tampere, Finland. At the championships, she qualified for the final, placing fifth overall with a personal best 57.34 seconds.

Wilson placed fifth in the 400 metres hurdles in a time of 57.88 seconds in May 2026 at the Atlantic Coast Conference Championships in Louisville, Kentucky. The following month, Wilson reached the final of the 400 metres hurdles at the 2026 UK Championships, placing third overall.
