= Funminiyi Olajide =

British long jumper (born 2002)

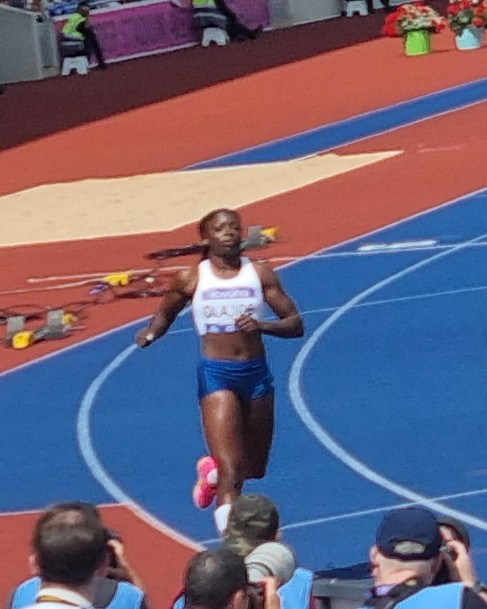
- 2025 UK Athletics Championships

Personal information
- Nationality: British
- Born: 4 June 2002 (age 24)

Sport
- Sport: Athletics
- Event: Long jump
- Club: Thurrock Harriers

Achievements and titles
- Personal best(s): Long jump 6.67m (Fayetteville, 2025)

Oluwafunminiyi Olajide (born 4 June 2002) is a British long jumper.

== Biography ==
She is from Thurrock, and attended William Edwards School in Grays, Essex. In January 2018, she won the long jump at the South of England Indoor Championships at Lee Valley with a personal best or 5.96 metres. A member of the Thurrock Harriers, she finished sixth with a jump of 6.28m at the British Athletics Championships, in July 2022.

She attended College in the United States at Southern Methodist University, in Dallas, Texas, winning Second Team All-American honors with a tenth place finish and a jump of 6.32 meters at the 2024 NCAA Indoor Championships in Boston, Massachusetts in March 2024.

Beginning in 2025, Olajide transferred to the Arkansas Razorbacks track and field team. She jumped a personal best 6.67 metres in Fayetteville, Arkansas on 14 February 2025. She was named in the British team for the 2025 World Athletics Indoor Championships in March 2025.

She finished in fourth place at the 2025 UK Athletics Championships in Birmingham with a best jump of 6.23 metres.

On 21 June 2026, she jumped 6.47 metres to place third in the long jump at the 2026 UK Athletics Championships in Birmingham behind Lucy Hadaway and Molly Palmer.
