= Lucy Hadaway =

British athlete (born 2000)

Personal information
- Nationality: British
- Born: 11 June 2000 (age 26)

Sport
- Sport: Athletics
- Event: Long jump
- Club: City of York AC

Achievements and titles
- Personal bests: Long jump 6.75m (Birmingham, 2026)
Medal record
Women's athletics
Representing Great Britain
European Athletics U23 Championships
Bronze medal – third place	2021 Tallinn	Long jump
Representing England
Commonwealth Youth Games
Bronze medal – third place	2017 Nassau	Long jump

Lucy Hadaway (born June 11, 2000) is a British track and field athlete who competes in the long jump. She won the 2026 British Indoor Athletics Championships.

== Biography ==
She is a member of the City of York Athletic Club. She was a bronze medallist in the 2017 Commonwealth Youth Games. Hadaway won the silver medal in the U20 long jump with a distance of 6.23m at the English National Championships in Bedford in 2018. She subsequently finished sixth in the long jump at the World Athletics U20 Championships in Tampere in 2018 with a jump of 6.13 metres. She was a bronze medalist at the 2021 European Athletics U23 Championships in Tallinn, Estonia with a jump of 6.63 metres.

She jumped a personal best 6.73 metres in May 2023 in Cyprus. She was selected for the British team for the 2023 European Athletics Team Championships held in Chorzów, Silesia, Poland between 20 and 25 June 2023, placing sixth with a jump of 6.43 metres as the British team placed fifth overall. She finished third at the 2023 British Athletics Championships in Manchester. In October 2023, she was included in the recipients of UK Athletics funding.

She won the England Athletics Championships title in July 2025 with a jump of 6.50 metres. She again jumped 6.50 metres (+3.8) to place second behind Jazmin Sawyers at the 2025 UK Athletics Championships.

Hadaway jumped 6.45 metres to win her first national title at the 2026 British Indoor Athletics Championships in Birmingham on 14 February 2026, finishing ahead of Alice Hopkins and Molly Palmer. On 21 June, Hadaway jumped 6.67 metres to win the long jump at the 2026 UK Athletics Championships in Birmingham, ahead of Palmer. Competing at the 2026 London Athletics Meet on 18 July, she jumped 6.64m. She was selected to represent England, placing sixth overall, in the long jump at the 2026 Commonwealth Games in Glasgow, Scotland. In August, she competed at the 2026 European Athletics Championships in Birmingham, England.
