= Athletics at the 2026 Commonwealth Games – Women's long jump =

Women's long jump at the 2026 Commonwealth Games
- Venue: Scotstoun Stadium, Glasgow
- Dates: 31 July (qualification); 1 August (final)

Medalists
gold medal	Jazmin Sawyers	England
silver medal	Ruth Usoro	Nigeria
bronze medal	Brooke Buschkuehl	Australia

The women's long jump at the 2026 Commonwealth Games, as part of the athletics programme, will place in the Scotstoun Stadium from 31 July to 1 August 2026.

== Records ==
Prior to this competition, the existing world, Commonwealth and Commonwealth Games records were as follows:

Women's Long jump
World record	7.52 m	Galina Chistyakova (URS)	11 Jun 1988	Leningrad, Soviet Union
Commonwealth record	7.17 m	Ese Brume (NGA)	29 May 2021	Chula Vista, United States
Games record	7.00 m	Ese Brume (NGA)	7 Aug 2022	Birmingham, England

== Schedule ==
The schedule is as follows:

Date	Time	Round
31 July 2026	10:00	Qualification
1 August 2026	19:00	Final

All times are British Summer Time (UTC+1)

== Results ==
=== Qualification ===
The qualification round was scheduled for the morning of 31 July 2026.

Rank	Group	Name	#1	#2	#3	Result	Notes	Qual.
1	B	Brooke Buschkuehl (AUS)	6.83 +1.8 m/s			6.83 +1.8 m/s	SB	Q
2	A	Jazmin Sawyers (ENG)	6.68 +2.6 m/s	x +1.7 m/s	6.80 +2.4 m/s	6.80 +2.4 m/s		Q
3	A	Lucy Hadaway (ENG)	6.77 +2.6 m/s			6.77 +2.6 m/s		Q
3	B	Ruth Usoro (NGR)	6.77 +0.6 m/s			6.77 +0.6 m/s	SB	Q
5	B	Molly Palmer (ENG)	6.64 +1.4 m/s	6.61 +1.0 m/s	6.46 +1.4 m/s	6.64 +1.4 m/s		q
6	B	Ackelia Smith (JAM)	6.46 +1.6 m/s	6.58 +1.3 m/s	6.50 +1.5 m/s	6.58 +1.3 m/s		q
7	A	Filippa Fotopoulou (CYP)	6.46 +1.0 m/s	6.56 +1.0 m/s	x +0.1 m/s	6.56 +1.0 m/s		q
8	A	Delta Amidzovski (AUS)	6.50 +2.5m/s	x +0.6 m/s	6.55 +2.4 m/s	6.55 +2.4 m/s		q
9	B	Tyra Gittens (TTO)	6.42 -0.7 m/s	6.48 +0.1 m/s	6.55 +1.6 m/s	6.55 +1.6 m/s		q
10	A	Isabella Goudros (CAN)	x +1.2 m/s	6.50 -0.6 m/s	6.35 +0.7 m/s	6.50 -0.6 m/s		q
11	A	Janae De Gannes (TTO)	x +1.6 m/s	6.31 +0.6 m/s	x +1.3 m/s	6.31 +0.6 m/s		q
12	A	Faith Kipsang (KEN)	x +1.6 m/s	6.23 +1.5 m/s		6.23 +1.5 m/s		q
13	B	Anthaya Charlton (BAH)	6.22 +0.2 m/s	x +2.6 m/s	6.22 +0.2 m/s	6.22 +0.2 m/s		
14	B	Rachela Pace (MLT)	6.16 +3.5 m/s	6.03 +2.3 m/s	x +2.8 m/s	6.16 +3.5 m/s		
15	B	Sienna MacDonald (CAN)	6.10 +2.3 m/s	5.90 -0.6 m/s	6.14 +0.9 m/s	6.14 +0.9 m/s		
16	A	Madushani Herath (SRI)	5.94 +0.2 m/s	5.86 +2.1 m/s	6.01 +3.8 m/s	6.01 +3.8 m/s		
17	B	Abi Galpin (GGY)	5.94 +1.7 m/s	5.53 +1.7 m/s	5.44 -0.3 m/s	5.94 +1.7 m/s	PB	
18	A	Tshegofatso Bojosi (BOT)	5.71 +1.0 m/s	5.76 +0.3 m/s	5.92 +1.1 m/s	5.92 +1.1 m/s		
19	B	Fayza Issaka (TOG)	x +1.1 m/s	5.84 -0.6 m/s	5.86 -0.6 m/s	5.86 -0.6 m/s		
20	A	Kimberly Smith (IVB)	5.35 +1.3 m/s	5.65 +2.4 m/s	5.64 +3.2 m/s	5.65 +2.4 m/s		
21	A	Swapna Khatun (BAN)	5.21 +1.4 m/s	5.24 +0.5 m/s	5.43 +0.0 m/s	5.43 +0.0 m/s	SB	
	B	Brooklyn Lyttle (BIZ)	x -2.2 m/s	x +0.3 m/s	x +2.1 m/s	NM		
	B	Chantel Malone (IVB)	x +3.2 m/s	x +2.5 m/s		NM		
	A	Nia Robinson (JAM)	x +2.0 m/s	x +0.4 m/s	x +1.4 m/s	NM		

=== Final ===
The final of the women's long jump is scheduled for the evening of 1 August 2026.

Rank	Name	1	2	3	4	5	6	Result	Notes
1st place, gold medalist(s)	Jazmin Sawyers (ENG)	6.46	6.75	6.64	6.93	6.90	-	6.93	
2nd place, silver medalist(s)	Ruth Usoro (NGR)	6.87	x	x	5.97	4.37	x	6.87	
3rd place, bronze medalist(s)	Brooke Buschkuehl (AUS)	6.80	6.53	6.66	6.47	x	6.79	6.80	
4	Delta Amidzovski (AUS)	6.75	x	6.57	x	x	6.41	6.75	
5	Tyra Gittens (TTO)	6.51	6.63	6.74	6.65	6.58	6.47	6.74	
6	Lucy Hadaway (ENG)	6.62	6.41	6.35	x	6.40	6.24	6.62	
7	Molly Palmer (ENG)	6.55	6.41	6.48	6.22	x	-	6.55	
8	Ackelia Smith (JAM)	6.47	6.28	6.48	6.37	6.52	6.41	6.52	
9	Faith Kipsang (KEN)	x	6.46	x	-	-	-	6.46	
10	Isabella Goudros (CAN)	6.45	6.16	6.33	-	-	-	6.45	
11	Janae De Gannes (TTO)	6.28	x	6.08	-	-	-	6.28	
12	Filippa Fotopoulou (CYP)	x	x	6.26	-	-	-	6.26	
