= Sophie Weißenberg =

German track and field athlete

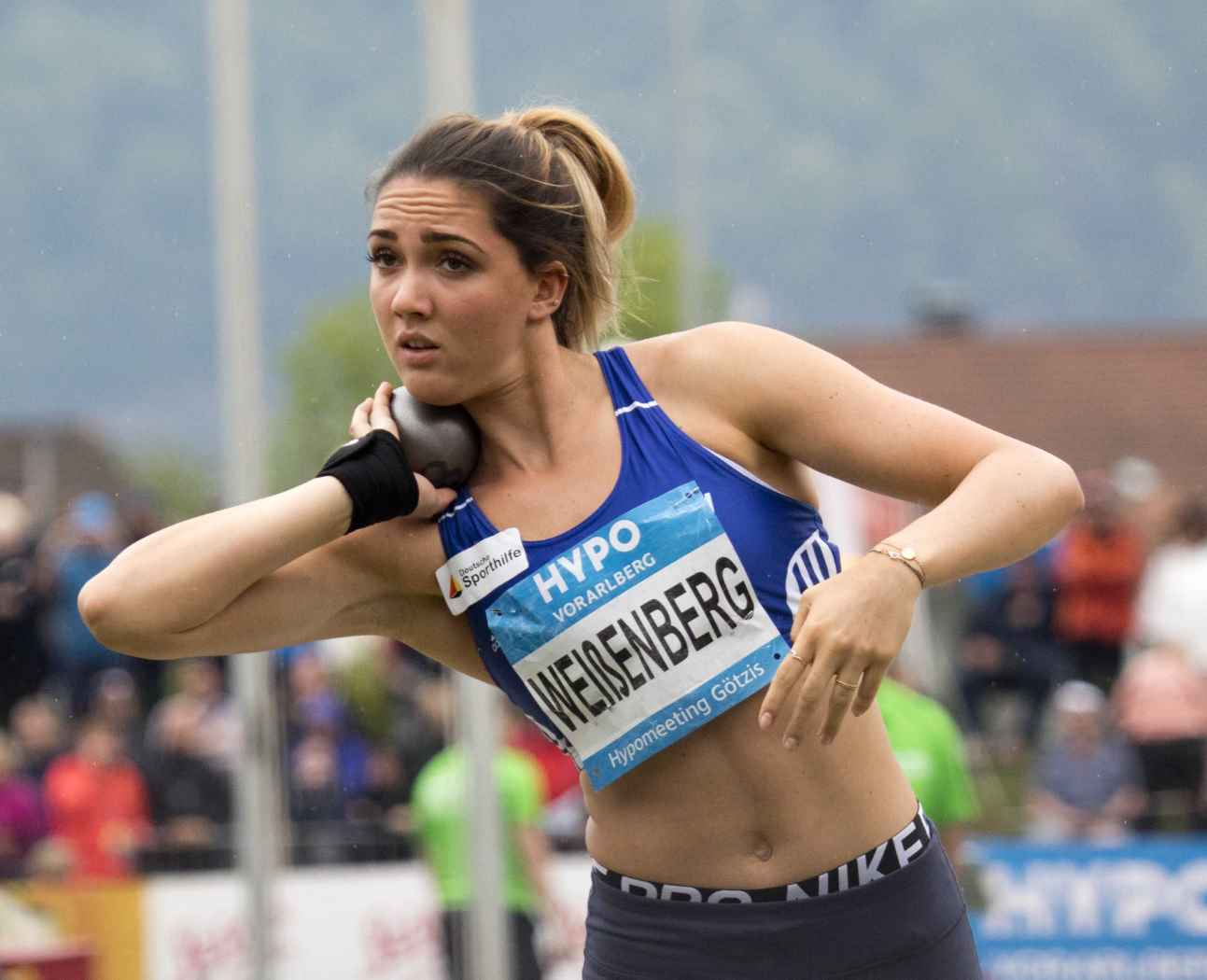

Personal information
- Born: 24 September 1997 (age 29) Neubrandenburg, Germany
- Height: 1.81 m (5 ft 11 in)

Sport
- Country: Germany
- Sport: Track and field
- Event: Heptathlon
- Club: TSV Bayer 04 Leverkusen
- Coached by: Jörg Roos
Medal record
Track and field
Representing Germany
World U20 Championships
Silver medal – second place	2016 Bydgoszcz	Long jump
European U23 Championships
Silver medal – second place	2019 Gävle	Heptathlon

Sophie Weißenberg (born 24 September 1997; sometimes written as Sophie Weissenberg) is a German track and field athlete. She is a World U20 silver medalist in long jump and a European U23 silver medalist in heptathlon.

She established herself as a member of Germany's athletics squad as an heptathlete, and qualified for the 2024 Summer Olympics in Paris. Tragically, her campaign ended before it began when she clipped a hurdle while warming up for the first event and suffered a ruptured Achilles tendon. Visibly devastated, she was forced to withdraw (recorded as "Did Not Start", DNS) and had to leave the track in a wheelchair, assisted by medical staff.

Weißenberg successfully returned to international competition, finishing fifth in the heptathlon at the 2026 European Championships in Birmingham.

== International competitions ==
Year	Competition	Venue	Position	Event	Notes
2016	World U20 Championships	Bydgoszcz, Poland	2nd	Long jump	6.40 m
2019	European U23 Championships	Gävle, Sweden	2nd	Heptathlon	6175 pts
2024	Olympic Games	Paris, France	—	Heptathlon	DNS
2026	European Championships	Birmingham, Great Britain	5th	Heptathlon	5689 pts
