= International School Sport Federation =

International sports governing body for school sport

International School Sport Federation Fédération Internationale du Sport Scolaire
- Abbreviation: ISF
- Formation: 1972
- Type: Sport federation
- Purpose: International School Sport Federation organises sport events for youth athletes of age 13–18.
- Headquarters: Lausanne, Switzerland
- Members: 124 National School Sports Federations (NSSF) (Dec 2025)
- Official language: French, English
- President: Željko Tanasković
- Website: www.isfsports.org

The International School Sport Federation (ISF) is an international sports governing body for school sport. Founded in 1972 with 21 European signatory nations, the federation has been organising international competitions to encourage education through sport and student athletes. It has 136 members, from five continents.

ISF is recognised by the International Olympic Committee since 1995, and is a member of SportAccord. Its headquarters was based in Brussels, Belgium. From January 2024, its headquarters was moved to Lausanne, Switzerland.

ISF limits itself to activities with school children between the ages of 13 and 18 (roughly contiguous with high school age). This distinguishes its role from the longer-established International University Sports Federation, which governs student sport from the ages of 17 to 25. There are currently 45 recognised ISF sports, with many of them having their own World Schools Championship every two years. Other sport disciplines are part of the Gymnasiade, also known as School Summer Games, its winter edition School Winter Games or ISF Combat Games.

The first official ISF championships were in football and volleyball, which both took place in 1972, athletics, basketball, handball and skiing championships followed a year later. The foremost competition held by the ISF is the Gymnasiade – a biennial multi-sport event first held in 1974 in Wiesbaden, Germany that featured athletics, gymnastics and swimming events.

In reaction to the 2022 Russian invasion of Ukraine, the ISF stripped Russia of the right to stage the 2024 ISF Gymnasiade, banned Russia and Belarus from participating in any ISF events, and blocked Russia and Belarus from sending representation to the ISF General Assembly.

== History ==
Around the mid-1960s, international sporting contests between schools has been increasing. Besides occasional and haphazard meetings between two or more schools, tournaments were beginning to be organised regularly in different disciplines: in handball from 1963, in volleyball from 1969, in football one year later, and from 1971 also in basketball. Each of these annual tournaments produced basic regulations and a standing committee.

The large number of international competitions requiring eliminating heats at the national level soon gave rise to a desire to co-ordinate these events, within a specific International Federation. To help promote this idea, the Federal Minister of Education and Arts of the Republic of Austria convened a Conference at Raach in the Autumn of 1971. Here the conditions were discussed for setting up a European School Sport Federation.

After very lengthy debates, the project was approved. However, bearing future development possibilities in mind, the ISF was not limited to European countries alone. A Provisional Committee, the members of which were chosen from among the 21 nations present, was set up, and the meeting of the constituent General Assembly was fixed for 4 June 1972 at Beaufort/Luxembourg. This meeting adopted the Statutes and proceeded to elect the members of the first Executive Committee.

In reaction to the 2022 Russian invasion of Ukraine, the ISF stripped Russia of the right to stage the 2024 ISF Gymnasiade, banned Russia and Belarus from participating in any ISF events, and blocked Russia and Belarus from sending representation to the ISF General Assembly.

== Gymnasiade ==
Gymnasiade is a school sport event for youth athletes aged 15–18 and 12–15. It is held every two (even) years, hosts between 12 and 25 different sport disciplines and welcomes over 3000 pupils from all over the world.

== Regional ==
=== Asia ===
- "Asian School Sport Federation's 14th General Assembly, Executive Committee meeting and the 7th edition of the ASSF Forum | International School Sport Federation". Archived from the original on 2021-05-11.
- "Unknown Title".
- "Unknown Title".

=== Europe ===
First European Schools Games Caen, France 2–8 July 1992.

== ISF World School Championships ==
Around the 1960s international sporting contests between schools were on the increase. Besides occasional and haphazard meetings between two or more schools, tournaments were beginning to be organised regularly in different disciplines: in handball from 1963, in volleyball from 1969, in football from 1970 and from 1971 also in basketball.

Today 21 sports have a separate World Schools Championship (WSC) with 10-12 championships being held per year. Each World Schools Championship usually last from 3–7 days. Yearly, more than 10.0000 pupils from all over the World take part in ISF World Schools Championship. Until 2017, only 21 Sports have a separate World School Championship (WSC). Other sports exist in Games (Summer, Winter or Combat) and haven't separate WSC.

Note: In 2025, 45 sports are approved by this federation. Considering that the Under-18 Gymnaside games are held every two years and the Under-15 Gymnaside games will be held in odd years from 2021, since 2019, there have been very few individual world championship competitions, and only a few team sports are held. More than 20 sports have never had an independent world championship competition. Triathlon and Cricket now have left this federation.

Results in previous sections.

#	Event	First Edition	Last Edition	Source
Main Sports
1	World School Athletics Championship	1973	24th (2017)	
2	World Schools Cross Country Championship	1975	23rd (2018)	
3	World School Swimming Championship	1981	12th (2017)	
Combat Sports
4	World School Sambo Championship	2018	1st (2018)	
Team Sports
5	World School 3x3 Basketball Championship	2014	3rd (2018)	
6	World School Basketball Championship	1973	24th (2017)	
7	World School Beach Volleyball Championship	2011	4th (2017)	
8	World School Cricket Championship	2018	1st (2018)	
9	World School Flying Disc Championship	2019	1st (2019)	
10	World School Football Championships	1972	26th (2017)	
11	World School Futsal Championships	2007	5th (2018)	
12	World School Beach Soccer Championships	2023	1th (2023)	
13	World School Handball Championship	1973	24th (2018)	
14	World School Volleyball Championship	1972	23rd (2018)	
Winter Sports
15	World School Alpine Ski Championship	1973	23rd (2016)	
Other Sports
16	World School Badminton Championship	1998	12th (2018)	
17	World School Orienteering Championship	1987	17th (2017)	
18	World School Sport Climbing Championship	2019	1st (2019)	
19	World School Table Tennis Championship	1991	15th (2018)	
20	World School Tennis Championship	1995	9th (2017)	
21	World School Triathlon Championship	2013	3rd (2017)	
22	World School Chess Championship	2019	1st (2019)	
23	World School Taekwondo Championship	2023	1st (2023)	

1st World School Taekwondo Poomsae Virtual Championship was held in 2020. Also Online Chess was held in 2021 and 2023.

Rugby in 2000 and 2006. Combat Games. Floorball. Gymnaside. Climbing remove ISF.

Baseball. Educational Games.

Source :

== Sports ==
45 Recognized sports (December 2025).

35 Individual Sports (Include 4 Para Sports)

10 Team Sports

== Events ==
=== Cycle ===
International School Games since 1974.

U18 Gymnasiade even-numbered years: 2022,2024,2026,2028

U15 Gymnasiade odd-numbered years: 2021,2023,2025,2027

ISF World School Championships 3 to 5 events/year Basketball, Cross-Country, Futsal, Handball, Volleyball, Golf

ISF World Cup - ISF Football World Cup Every even year since 2024

World Teacher Games - Event for PE teachers from the world

She Runs International event promoting school girls' participation and leadership through sport

=== 2026 ===
1. Handball - April, North Macedonia
2. Basketball - June, Serbia
3. Volleyball - July, China
4. Football - October, China
5. Golf - TBD, Morocco
6. U18 Gymnasiade - TBD, TBD

== Members ==
124 Nations (December 2025).

=== Regions ===
#	Region	Countries
1	Africa	33
2	Asia	26
3	Oceania	2
4	Americas	17
5	Europe	46
Total	World	124

=== Nations ===
Code	Country	Association
AFG	Afghanistan	Afghanistan School Sport Federation
ALB	Albania	Albanian School Sport Federation
ALG	Algeria	Algerian School Sport Federation
AND	Andorra	Secretariat d'état aux sports, de la jeunesse et du volontariat
ARG	Argentina	
ARM	Armenia	School Sport Federation of Armenia
AUT	Austria	Bundesministerium für Bildung und Frauen
AUS	Australia	School Sport Australia
BAN	Bangladesh	
BRN	(Bahrain) Bahrein	Bahrein School and Collegiate Athletics Association
BAH	(The Bahamas) Bahamas	
BEN	Benin	Ministerio de Deportes
BOL	Bolivia	Ministerio de Deportes
BOT	Botswana	Botswana Integrated Sport Association
BRA	Brazil	Confederação Brasileira do Desporto Escolar
BUL	Bulgaria	Bulgarian Association Sport for Students
BUR	Burkina Faso	
CMR	Cameroon	Fenassco
CAN	Canada	School Sport Canada
CPV	Cape Verde	Coordenação Nacional de Educação Física e Desporto Escolar
CHI	Chile	Club Deportivo Universidad Catica de Chile
CHN	People's Republic of China	China School Sport Federation
TPE	Chinese Taipei	Chinese Taipei School Sport Federation
COL	Colombia	Coldeportes
COM	Comoros	Coordination de Nationale I'Education et Sport Scolaire
COD	Democratic Republic of the Congo	
CRO	Croatia	Croatian School Sport Federation
CYP	Cyprus	Ministry of Education and Culture
CZE	Czech Republic	Czech School Sports and Clubs association
DEN	Denmark	Danish Schoolsport Association
DOM	Dominican Republic	Instituto Nacional de Educacion Fisica
DGB	Eastern Belgium	Ministerium der Deutschsprachigen Gemeinschaft / Fachbereich Sport
ENG	England	National Council for School Sports
GEQ	Equatorial Guinea	
EST	Estonia	Estonian School Sport Union
FIN	Finland	Finnish School Sport Federation
FLA	(Flanders) Flemish Community	Stichting Vlaamse Schoolsport
FRA	France	Union Nationale du Sport Scolaire
CFB	Wallonia-Brussels Federation	
PYF	French Polynesia	Union du Sport Scholaire Polynesien
GAB	Gabon	
GAM	(The Gambia) Gambia	Sport University of The Gambia
GEO	(Georgia (country)) Georgia	Children and Youth Sports National Federation of Georgia
GER	Germany	Kommission Sport der KMK der Länder
GHA	Ghana	
GRE	Greece	Directorate of Physical Education
GUA	Guatemala	Direccion General de Educacición Fisica
GUI	Guinea	
HAI	Haiti	Haitian School Sport Federation
HKG	Hong Kong, China	Hong Kong Schools Sports Federation
HUN	Hungary	Hungarian School Sport Federation
IND	India	School Games Federation of India
IRI	Islamic Republic of Iran	Iran School Sport Federation
ISR	Israel	Ministry of education, culture and sports
IRQ	Iraq	Iraq Sport
IRL	(Republic of Ireland) Ireland	Irish School Sport Federation
ITA	Italy	Ministero dell Instruzione dell universita e della Ricerca
CIV	Ivory Coast	Office Ivoirien des Sports Scolaires et Universitaires
JAM	Jamaica	
JOR	Jordan	
KGZ	Kyrgyzstan	School Sport Federation of Kyrgyz Republic
KAZ	Kazakhstan	Kazakhstan School Sport Federation
KEN	Kenya	Kazakhstan School Sport Federation
KOS	Kosovo	School Sport Federation of the Republic of Kosovo
KUW	Kuwait	Ministry of Education, Kuwait
LAT	Latvia	Latvian School Sport Federation
LBA	Libya	Libyan Student Sport Federation
LBN	Lebanon	Ministry of Education and Higher Education
LIE	Liechtenstein	Liechtensteinische landesverwaltung
LIT	Lithuania	
LUX	Luxembourg	Ligue des Associations Sportive Estudiantines
MAC	Macau, China	
MAD	Madagascar	Fédération Omnisports scolaire Madagascar
MLI	Mali	
MLT	Malta	Malta School Sport Federation
MRI	Mauritania	
MGL	Mongolia	
MNE	Montenegro	Association Montenegrine du Sport Scolaire
MAR	Morocco	Federation Royale Marocaine du Sport Scolaire
NAM	Namibia	Namibia School Sport Union
NEP	Nepal	
NED	Netherlands	Koninklijke Vereniging van Leraren Lichamelịke Opvoeding
NZL	New Zealand	New Zealand Secondary School Sports Council
NCA	Nicaragua	Instituto Nicaraguense de Deportes
NIG	Niger	
NGA	Nigeria	Nigerian School Sport Federation
MKD	North Macedonia	Macedonian Schools Sports Federation
OMA	Oman	
PAK	Pakistan	PSSF - Pakistan Schools Sports Federation
PAR	Paraguay	Secretaria Nacional de Deportes
PER	Peru	Asociacion Peruana del Deporte Escolar
POL	Poland	Szkolny Zwiazek Sportowy
POR	Portugal	Gabinete Coordenador do Desporto Escolar
PUR	Puerto Rico	Propulsores del Deporte
ROU	Romania	Scholar and University Sports Federation
QAT	Qatar	Qatar Sport School Federation
QUE	Quebec	Foundation Équip-Québec
RSR	(Republika Srpska) Republic of Srpska	Ministry for Family, Youth and Sport
ROU	Romania	Ministry Of Education And Research / Scholar And University Sports Federation
STP	São Tomé and Príncipe	
KSA	Saudi Arabia	Ministry of Education
SCO	Scotland	Scottish SchoolSport Federation
SEN	Senegal	Comité National de Gestion et de Relance du Sport Scolaire (CNG/RSS) - Sénégal
SRB	Serbia	School Sports and Olympic Education Federation of Serbia
SIN	Singapore	Singapore School Sport Council
SLO	Slovenia	Zavod za sport RS Planica
SVK	Slovakia	Slovak School Sport Association
RSA	South Africa	South African Sports Confederation
ESP	Spain	Ministerio de Educación y Ciencia
SRI	Sri Lanka	Schools Sports Council
SUR	Suriname	Ministry of Education and Youth Affairs
SWE	Sweden	Svenska Skolidrottsförbundet
SUI	Switzerland	Schweizerischer Verband fur Sport in der Schule
TAN	Tanzania	
TGO	Togo	
TUN	Tunisia	Federation Tunisienne des Sports Scolaires et Universiateires
TUR	Turkey	Turkiye Okul Sporlary Federasyonu
TKM	Turkmenistan	School Sport Federation of Turkmenistan
THA	Thailand	Ministry of Tourism and Sports
UAE	United Arab Emirates	UAE Interschool Sports Association
UGA	Uganda	
UKR	Ukraine	School Sport Federation of Ukraine
USA	United States	Amateur Athletic Union of the United States
