= 2026 UK Athletics Championships =

British athletics event

- Dates: 20-21 June 2026
- Host city: Birmingham, England
- Venue: Alexander Stadium
- Level: Senior
- Type: Outdoor

The 2026 UK Athletics Championships (formally known as the British Athletics Championships) is the 2026 edition of the annual national championships in outdoor track and field for athletes in the United Kingdom, and also serves as a qualifying event or trials for the 2026 European Athletics Championships.

The event is sponsored by Novuna and is held from 20 to 21 June 2026. The championships return to the Alexander Stadium in Birmingham, which will also host the 2026 European Athletics Championships, the first time that event has been hosted in the United Kingdom.

The 10,000 metres, marathon and combined events (heptathlon and decathlon) disciplines to determine the British champions in those events will be held separately, at different venues and dates - in all three cases, they were combined with other athletics events.

== European Championships qualification ==
The criteria for selection are broader than are the case for a World or Olympic championships, involving multiple steps and exemptions, but the winner of each event held at the UK Athletics Championships will be automatically selected if they have the European Athletics qualification standard.

Individual medalists from the most recent World Athletics Championships and Summer Olympics are also preselected if they have the qualification standard, subject to fitness and form.

Criteria	Athlete	Event
EA Wild Cards (reigning EAC individual champions)	Dina Asher-Smith; Keely Hodgkinson	Women's 100 m Women's 800 m
2025 World medalists	Jake Wightman; Amy Hunt; Georgia Hunter Bell; Katarina Johnson-Thompson	Men's 1500 m Women's 200 m Women's 800 m Women's heptathlon
2024 Olympic medalists	Matthew Hudson-Smith; Josh Kerr; Georgia Hunter Bell	Men's 400 m Men's 1500 m Women's 800 m

Athletes will then be selected on the basis of the following criteria, in order:

- Winner of each event at the 2026 UK Athletics Championships in Birmingham on 20 and 21 June, or the equivalent British championship events in Marathon, 10,000 metres or combined events, if they possess the required entry standard;
- Remaining athletes with a European Athletics Entry Standard;
- Remaining athletes with European Athletics Ranking position;
- Athletes selected for relay events only to ensure full teams.

Three athletes per individual event may be selected, or four where one place is taken by an athlete with an EA wild card.

In the Marathon, a team of up to six per sex could be nominated, to compete in both the individual marathon and team competitions.

The 5000 metres race walks are held as demonstrations, and not European Championship events.

== Results ==
=== Men ===
Event	Gold		Silver		Bronze	
100 metres (+0.5 m/s)	Romell Glave	9.98	Zharnel Hughes	10.01	Louie Hinchliffe	10.03
200 metres	Zharnel Hughes	20.04	Nethaneel Mitchell-Blake	20.35	Ebuka Nwokeji	20.55
400 metres	Matthew Hudson-Smith	44.45	Ben Jefferies	44.66	Charlie Dobson	44.69
800 metres	Jake Wightman	1:45.40	Ben Pattison	1:45.49	Alex Botterill	1:46.01
1500 metres	Arlo Ludewick	3:38.85	Jake Heyward	3:38.97	Thomas Keen	3:39.32
5000 metres	David Mullarkey	13:27.00	Andrew Butchart	13:27.52	James West	13:27.75
110 metres hurdles	Sam Bennett	13.41	Tade Ojora	13.49	Ethan Akanni	14.09*
400 metres hurdles	Alistair Chalmers	49.05	Joshua Faulds	49.36	Jake Minshull	49.38
3000m s'chase	Kristian Imroth	8:18.97 CR	Will Battershill	8:22.97	Zak Seddon	8:23.99
5000 metres walk	Cameron Corbishley	19:54.98	Thomas Guy	22:50.39	Tim Perry	24:40.76
Long jump	Stephen Mackenzie	8.15 m SNR	Archie Yeo	8.06 m	Regan Corrin	7.76 m
Triple jump	Daniel Falode	15.76 m	Jude Bright-Davies	15.72 m	Sean Atafo	15.56 m
High jump	Joel Clarke-Khan	2.27 m	Kimani Jack	2.24 m	Charlie Husbands	2.21 m
Pole vault	Owen Heard	5.40 m	Thomas Walley	5.30 m	Charlie Myers	5.30 m
Shot put	Scott Lincoln	20.33 m	Piers Cameron	18.38 m	Patrick Swan	17.67 m
Discus throw	Lawrence Okoye	68.81 m CR	Nicholas Percy	60.27 m	Dillon Claydon	55.33 m
Hammer throw	Jake Norris	76.30 m	Craig Murch	71.73 m	Chris Bennett	70.12 m
Javelin throw	Benjamin East	79.87 m	Michael Allison	77.63 m	Daniel Bainbridge	75.62 m

The UK Athletics 10,000 metre Championships were held as the final elite races of the Loughborough international Meet with the assistance of England Athletics. An open event, the highest placed British athletes from the mixed field determine the placings.

Event	Gold		Silver		Bronze	
10,000 m	Joe Wigfield	28:56.39*	James Kingston	29:09.01	Max Milarvie	29:13.51

* The race itself was won by the former Ethiopian runner, Kadar Omar, who lives and trains in the UK, but competes currently as a Refugee athlete.

The British Marathon Championships for 2026 was, as has been the case for several years, held as part of the 2026 London Marathon. As with the 10,000 metre championships, the highest placed British athletes from the mixed field determine the placings.

Event	Gold		Silver		Bronze	
Marathon	Mahamed Mahamed	2:06.14	Patrick Dever	2:06.18	Weynay Ghebresilasie	2:06.59

- Mahamed Mahamed, Jonny Mellor, Ellis Cross, Weynay Ghebresilasie and Tewelde Menges were selected for the European championships UK marathon team.

British Combined Events Championships

Held on 4 and 5 July 2026 as part of the English Senior Championships.

Event	Gold		Silver		Bronze	
Decathlon	Sammy Ball	7809	Harry Kendall	7495	Sulaiman Ouiles	7382

=== Women ===
Event	Gold		Silver		Bronze	
100 metres (+1.7 m/s)	Amy Hunt	11.01	Dina Asher-Smith	11.03	Mabel Akande	11.18
200 metres	Success Eduan	22.43	Amy Hunt	22.64	Kristal Ama-Awuah	22.99
400 metres	Amber Anning	50.16 CR	Yemi Mary John	50.23	Charlotte Henrich	50.58
800 metres	Georgia Hunter Bell	1:55.93 CR	Isabelle Boffey	1:59.56	Lucy Armitage	2:00.45
1500 metres	Sarah Calvert	4:07.28	Katie Snowden	4:08.22	Laura Muir	4:08.73
5000 metres	Hannah Nuttall	15:15.03	Innes Fitzgerald	15:18.94	Eloise Walker	15:19.34
100 metres hurdles (+1.5 m/s)	Marcia Sey	12.65 CR	Emma Nwofor	12.90	Alicia Barrett	13.09
400 metres hurdles	Emily Newnham	54.50	Hayley Mclean	56.90	Arabella Wilson	58.28
3000m s'chase	Elise Thorner	9:16.95 CR	Stevie Lawrence	9:32.03	Sarah Tait	10:01.42
5000 metres walk	Bethan Davies	23:43.39	Abigail Jennings	25:31.80	Natasha Mitchell	26:17.82
Long jump	Lucy Hadaway	6.67 m	Molly Palmer	6.50 m	Funminiye Olajide	6.47 m
Triple jump	Georgina Forde-Wells	13.53 m	Reese Robinson	13.19 m	Qi-Chi Ukpai	13.14 m
High jump	Gabrielle Garber	1.84 m	Hannah Lake	1.78 m	Halle Ferguson	1.78 m
Pole vault	Gemma Tutton	4.50 m	Jade Ives	4.40 m	Tilly Hooper	4.30 m
Shot put	Serena Vincent	17.02 m	Alani Dumbuya	15.26 m	Cleo Agyepong	15.15 m
Discus throw	Zara Obamakinwa	55.85 m	Kirsty Law	49.71 m	Eden Francis	48.76 m
Hammer throw	Anna Purchase	71.88 m	Charlotte Payne	70.25 m	Tara Simpson-Sullivan	63.90 m
Javelin throw	Freya Jones	58.12 m	Lauren Farley	52.25 m	Harriet Wheeler	51.07 m

The UK Athletics 10,000 metre Championships were held as the final elite races of the Loughborough international Meet with the assistance of England Athletics. An open event, the highest placed British athletes from the mixed field determine the placings.

Event	Gold		Silver		Bronze	
10,000 m	Izzy Fry	32:12.90	Poppy Tank	32:15.30	Hannah Irwin	32:22.57

The British Marathon Championships for 2026 was, as has been the case for several years, held as part of the 2026 London Marathon. As with the 10,000 metre championships, the highest placed British athletes from the mixed field determine the placings.

Event	Gold		Silver		Bronze	
Marathon	Eilish McColgan	2:24.51	Rose Harvey	2:26.14	Louise Small	2:28.29

- Abbie Donnelly, Natasha Wilson, Clara Evans, Louise Small and Rose Harvey were selected for the European championships marathon team.

British Combined Events Championships.

Held on 4 and 5 July 2026 as part of the English Senior Championships.

Event	Gold		Silver		Bronze	
Heptathlon	Neve Davenport	5422	Lily Holt	5239	Zoe Gregory	5222

=== Para-athletic events ===
The Championships also hosted a number of para-athletic events. In mixed classification events, 'disability points', a form of factoring, decided the medals rather than raw times.

Event	Gold		Silver		Bronze	
Men's events
100 m ambulant 1 (MC)	Thomas Young (T38)	10.79	Zac Shaw (T12)	10.76	Ryan Hannah (T44)	11.62
100 m Frame running (MC)	Chris Jacquin (T71)	22.48	Finlay Menzies (T72)	16.57	Gavin Drysdale (T72)	16.80
1500 m wheelchair (MC)	Nathan Maguire (T54)	3:06.37	Joshua Hartley (T53)	3:30.09	Kyle Brotherton (T54)	3:41.25
Women's events
100 m ambulant (MC)	Ndidikama Okoh (T42)	15.44	Hetty Bartlett (T38)	13.69	Bebe Jackson (T44)	13.94
400 m wheelchair (MC)	Melanie Woods (T54)	55.52	Kare Adenegan (T34)	1:04.49	Joanna Robertson (T54)	1:06.59

== Broadcasting ==
In the United Kingdom, the championhips are shown online by the BBC as part of a multi-event deal with UK Athletics.
