= 2013 World School Athletics Championship =

- Dates: 22-27 June 2013
- Host city: Sokolov, Czech Republic
- Level: U20, U18

The 2013 World School Athletics Championship events were held in Sokolov and the Karlovy Vary Region of the Czech Republic from 22 to 27 June 2013.

The championships were highlighted by Vincent Basima's win in the boy's 100 m with a time of 10.91 seconds.

== Medal summary ==
=== Men (under 20) ===
Event	Gold		Silver		Bronze	
100 metres	Yongqi Zhu; China	10.97	Joseph Dewar; Great Britain	11.12	Mompoloki Phaladi; Botswana	11.49
200 metres	Jinsheng Liang; China	21.54	Laurens Francois; Belgium	21.83	Kacper Wieclaw; Poland	22.26
400 metres	Berk Köksal; Turkey	49.58	Matúš Talan; Slovakia	50.24	Marek Ptáček; Czech Republic	52.75

=== Boys (under 18) ===
Event	Gold		Silver		Bronze	
100 metres	Vincent Basima; Botswana	10.91	Karabo Mothibi; Botswana	10.97	Abdulaziz Rabie Al Jadani; Saudi Arabia	11.19
200 metres	Jakub Matúš; Slovakia	22.38	Olefile Sky; Botswana	22.50	Brahm Shaquille; Netherlands	22.52
400 metres	Mazin Motan Alyasin; Saudi Arabia	47.62	Batuhan Altıntaş; Turkey	48.00	Joshua Robinson; Australia	48.71
800 metres	David Zawadzki; Germany	1:59.22	Jacob Lawrence; Australia	2:01.41	Dominik Greguš; Slovakia	2:02.64
1500 metres	Scott Halsted; Great Britain	4:04.25	Haitao Yu; China	4:06.09	Simon Debognies; Belgium	4:10.41
110 metres hurdles (91.4cm)	Igor Vianna Jeronimo; Brazil	14.35	Felipe Milani Da Silva; Brazil	14.68	Longcheng Yang; China	14.76
110 metres hurdles (91.4cm)	Igor Vianna Jeronimo; Brazil	14.35	Felipe Milani Da Silva; Brazil	14.68	Yahya Najran Sharahili; Saudi Arabia	14.76
300 metres hurdles (83.8cm)	Timothy Penberthy; Australia	39.55	Haydar Erdem Caglayan; Turkey	40.75	Saad Abdullah Albishi; Saudi Arabia	40.84
Swedish relay	Saudi Arabia; Zuylen, Brahm, Nkurunziza, Lensen	1:59.15	Australia; Phillips, Oates, Lawrence, Robinson	2:00.16	Botswana; Bazima, Mothibi, Sky, Keetile	2:00.38
High jump	Roben Dedecker; Belgium	1.84 m	Daniel Stratton; Great Britain	1.84 m	Coen Oates; Australia	1.81 m
Pole vault	Hussein Asem Al Hezam; Saudi Arabia	4.80 m	Adrian Misiolek; Poland	3.90 m	Jack James Longhurst; Great Britain	3.70 m
Long jump	Jakub Rusek; Czech Republic	7.03 m	Batuhan Altıntaş; Turkey	6.66 m	Ben Thiele; Germany	6.54 m
Triple jump	Cem Sahin; Turkey	14.37 m	Germain Haewegene; France	13.56 m	Mompoloki Phaladi; Botswana	13.15 m
Shot put (5kg)	Loic Pahikivatau; France	14.54 m	Yasin Yildirim; Turkey	13.87 m	Jean-Marc Tafilagi; France	12.96 m
Discus throw (1.5kg)	Clemens Prüfer; Germany	54.12 m	Pavol Ženčár; Slovakia	52.64 m	Matěj Svoboda; Czech Republic	48.23 m
Javelin throw (700g)	Maximilian Slezák; Slovakia	67.93 m	Emin Öncel; Turkey	66.61 m	Harry Hughes; Great Britain	64.54 m

=== Women (under 20) ===
Event	Gold		Silver		Bronze	
100 metres	Haiqin Liu; China	12.46	Natália Ostrožlíková; Slovakia	12.55	Ina Van Lancker; Belgium	12.58
200 metres	Emma Coppenolle; Belgium	25.97	Lopang Kamberuka; Austria	25.99	Zuzana Karaffová; Slovakia	26.12
400 metres	Sabrina Bakare; Great Britain	55.12	Viktória Záhradníčková; Slovakia	55.99	Busra Yildirim; Turkey	58.20

=== Girls (under 18) ===
Event	Gold		Silver		Bronze	
100 metres	Qun Liu; China	12.30	Luisa Pagels; Germany	12.31	Lesley Scanlan; Australia	12.56
200 metres	Gosego Mpeo; Botswana	25.44	Casandra Kgosiesele; Botswana	26.21	Jade Packer; Great Britain	26.33
400 metres	Galefele Moroko; Botswana	54.44	Mikhela Bayes; Australia	56.27	Daniela Ledecká; Slovakia	56.71
