= Molly Palmer =

British long jumper (born 2003)

Personal information
- Born: 27 August 2003 (age 23)

Sport
- Sport: Athletics
- Event: Long jump

Achievements and titles
- Personal best: Long jump: 6.72 m (2026)

Molly Palmer (born 27 August 2003) is a British long jumper. She had top-ten finishes representing Great Britain at the 2026 World Indoor Championships and 2026 European Championships and placed seventh representing England at the 2026 Commonwealth Games.

== Biography ==
Palmer was born and raised in Ruddington, Nottinghamshire. Her parents were both international gymnasts. Palmer also competed in gymnastics for Notts and East Midlands until the age of 12 years-old. After transitioning to athletics she began training at Charnwood Athletics Club. As a junior, she ranked number one in the UK in her age group and won British age-group national titles. She later studied human biology at Loughborough University and began to be coached by Lukasz Zawila.

In 2022, Palmer jumped a personal best of 6.28m (+1.5 m/s) competing for Great Britain at the Mannheim International in Germany. She was a finalist in the ling jump at the 2022 World Athletics U20 Championships in Cali, Colombia.

Palmer was third at the 2024 British Indoor Athletics Championships, placing one centimetre behind winner Jade O'Dowda. That month, she placed second at the British Universities and Colleges Sport (BUCS) Indoor Championships. In June, she placed third at the 2024 British Athletics Championships in Manchester.

Palmer placed third in the 60 metres behind Joy Eze and Alyson Bell in 7.32 seconds at the 2025 BUCS Indoor Championships. Palmer won the long jump title at the BUCS Outdoor Championships in May 2025, with a jump of 6.50 metres. She won the women's long jump at Loughborough International that months with a wind-assisted jump of 6.67 metres, finishing ahead of Jasmin Sawyers and Abigail Pawlett. She was named in the British team for the 2025 Summer World University Games in Germany, but missed the Games through injury having suffered a torn hamstring at the JBL Jump Fest in Slovakia in June, where she had recorded a personal best of 6.51m during the competition.

Palmer placed third behind Lucy Hadaway and Alice Hopkins at the 2025 British Indoor Athletics Championships in Birmingham on 14 February 2026. The following weekend, Palmer jumped a personal best 6.68 metres in Cardiff. The following month, Palmer placed tenth overall making her senior major championships debut representing Great Britain at the 2026 World Athletics Indoor Championships in Toruń, Poland, on 22 March, landing a best jump of 6.49 metres, despite having to retake her first jump due to the championship officials leaving an unprepared pit. On 21 June, Palmer jumped 6.50 metres to place second behind Lucy Hadaway in the long jump at the 2026 UK Athletics Championships in Birmingham.

Palmer was selected to represent England and placed seventh overall in the long jump at the 2026 Commonwealth Games in Glasgow, Scotland. On 15 August, Palmer jumped a personal best of 6.72m to qualify for the final at the 2026 European Championships in Birmingham, placing ninth overall.

In October 2026, she was retained on the 2026/27 Olympic Futures Programme awarded by UK Athletics. She joined University of California, Los Angeles ahead of the 2026-27 college track and field season.
