= World School Athletics Championship =

- Frequency: Every 2 years
- Inaugurated: 1973 (Greece) Athens
- Most recent: 2023 (Turkey) Trabzon
- Next event: 2025

The World School Athletics Championship is a sport of athletics international championship for under-18 athletes, part of the International School Sport Federation ISF World Schools Championships. With some exceptions, it has been held on a biennial basis since its inception in 1971.

Athletes are represented by both their school and their country. Some nations such as Nigeria hold trials races to decide their teams, while others choose teams by selection. The event was formerly known as the NSSF World School Athletics Championship.

== Editions ==
The championships have been held 26 times since 1973.

Edition	Year	City	Country
1	1973	Athens	Greece
2	1973	Wiesbaden	Germany
3	1974	Florence	Italy
4	1975	Poitiers	France
5	1977	Saint-Étienne	France
6	1981	Salzburg	Austria
7	1983	Blankenberge	Belgium
8	1985	Lanzarote	Spain
9	1987	Tel Aviv	Israel
10	1989	Messina	Italy
11	1991	Budapest	Hungary
12	1993	Alba	Italy
13	1995	Banská Bystrica	Slovenia
14	1997	Cherbourg	France
15	1999	Reutlingen	Germany
16	2001	Málaga	Spain
17	2003	Istanbul	Turkey
18	2005	Vila Real de Santo António	Portugal
19	2007	Mérignac / Bordeaux	France
20	2009	Tallinn	Estonia
21	2011	Bydgoszcz	Poland
22	2013	Sokolov	Czech Republic
23	2015	Wuhan	China
24	2017	Nancy	France
25	2019	Split	Croatia
26	2023	Trabzon	Turkey
