= Ida Andrea Breigan =

Norwegian athlete (born 2004)

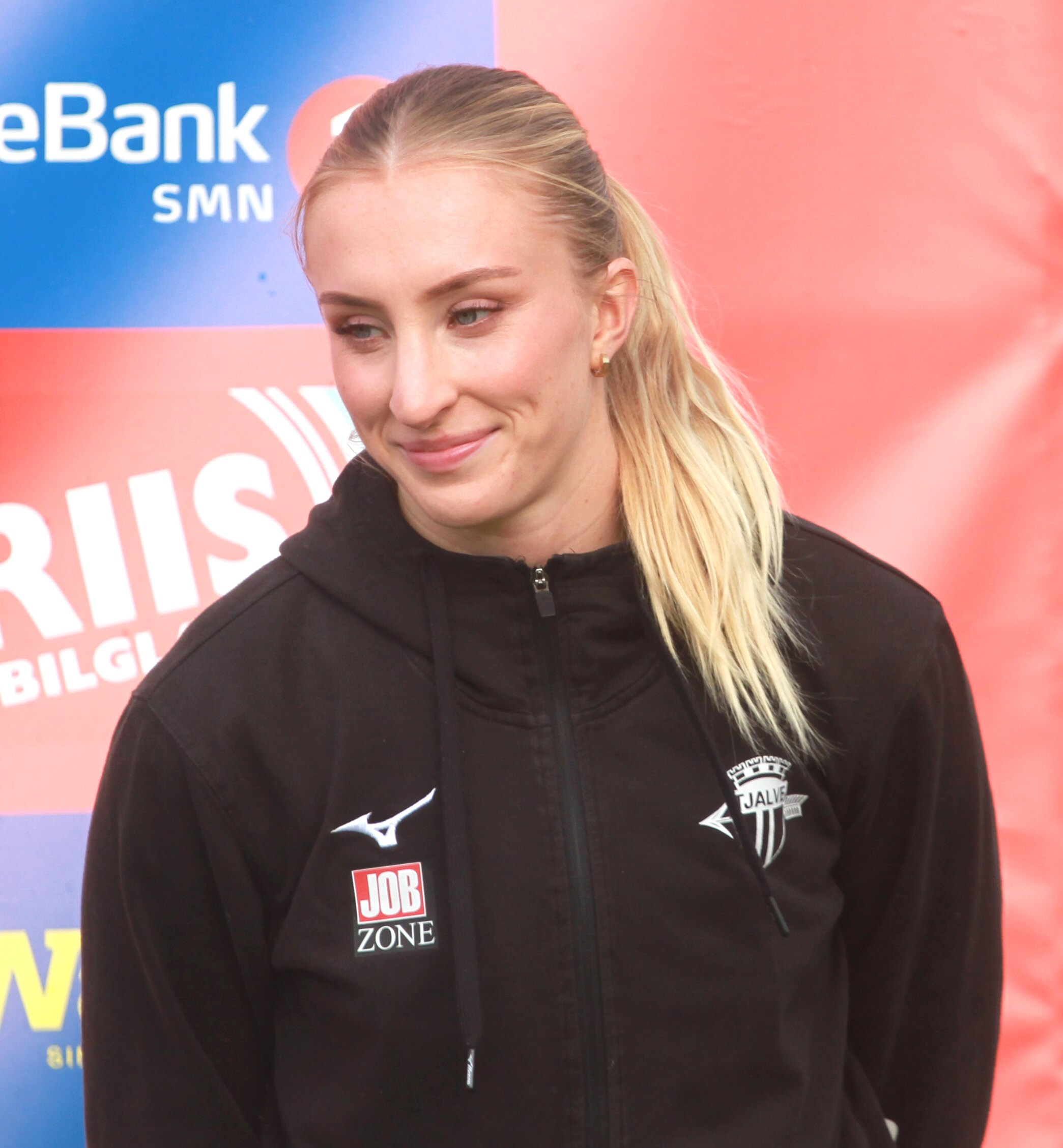

Personal information
- Born: 22 July 2004 (age 22)

Sport
- Sport: Athletics
- Event: Long jump

Achievements and titles
- Personal best: Long jump: 6.74 m (2024)
Medal record
Women's athletics
Representing Norway
European U23 Championships
Bronze medal – third place	2025 Bergen	Long jump

Ida Andrea Breigan (born 22 July 2004) is a Norwegian long jumper. She is the Norwegian national indoor record holder.

== Early life ==
She is from Fredrikstad. Her father, Bo Breigan, was a Norwegian 800 metres champion and her mother, Mimi Storm-Hansen, was a Norwegian high jump champion.

== Career ==
After high school she studied at the University of Texas at San Antonio in the United States, where she was coached by former World Championship silver medalist Kareem Streete-Thompson. She became Norwegian champion both indoors and outdoors in 2023. In February 2024, she broke Berit Berthelsen's 57-year-old Norwegian record for the indoor long jump whilst competing in Albuquerque, New Mexico, and improved her own record to 6.58 metres two weeks later in Birmingham, Alabama.

She was selected for the 2025 European Athletics Team Championships Second Division in Maribor in June 2025, finishing second overall with a jump of 6.60 metres. She was selected to represent her country at the 2025 European Athletics U23 Championships in Bergen, Norway, winning the bronze medal with a jump of 6.58 metres.

Breigan qualified for the 2026 NCAA Division I Indoor Track and Field Championships, placing eighth overall. That summer, she also qualified for the 2026 NCAA Outdoor Championships.
