= Alice Hopkins =

British long jumper (born 1998)

Personal information
- Nationality: British
- Born: 30 December 1998 (age 27)

Sport
- Sport: Athletics
- Event: Long jump
- Club: Oxford City AC

Achievements and titles
- Personal best(s): Long jump: 6.59m (Birmingham, 2025)
Medal record
Women's athletics
Representing Great Britain
British Athletics Championships
Silver medal – second place	2024 Manchester	Long jump
British Athletics Indoor Championships
Gold medal – first place	2025 Birmingham	Long jump

Alice Hopkins (born 30 December 1998) is a British long jumper. She became British indoor champion in 2025.

== Career ==
She is from Thame, Oxfordshire and is a member of Oxford City Athletic Club. In 2018, she won golds in the Under 23 National Championships in the long jump and the Senior South of England Heptathlon Championship. She retained her U23 national long jump title in 2019, and competed at the 2019 European Athletics U23 Championships, placing seventh overall in the long jump, in Gävle, Sweden. She also competed in the heptathlon, finishing second in the Home Countries International in August 2019.

She was runner-up to Jade O'Dowda at the 2024 British Athletics Championships long jump competition in June 2024. In 2024, she jumped a wind-assisted 6.72m (+2.3) whilst competing in Greece.

In February 2025, she won the long jump title ahead of O'Dowda, at the 2025 British Indoor Athletics Championships, in Birmingham, in February 2025, for her first national title. She won with a personal best effort of 6.59m in the fifth round. She was selected for the British team for the 2025 European Athletics Indoor Championships in Apeldoorn. At the Games, she jumped tenth furthest with 6.46 metres. She finished in third place at the 2025 UK Athletics Championships behind Jazmin Sawyers and Lucy Hadaway.

Hopkins was runner-up to Hadaway at the 2026 British Indoor Athletics Championships in Birmingham on 14 February 2026.

Hopkins is coached by former Olympic 100 metres champion Linford Christie.
