= Ramona Elena Verman =

Romanian athlete (born 2004)

Personal information
- Born: 3 March 2004 (age 22)

Sport
- Sport: Athletics
- Event: Long jump

Achievements and titles
- Personal best: Long jump: 6.72 m (2026)
Medal record
Women's athletics
Representing Romania
European U23 Championships
Gold medal – first place	2025 Bergen	Long jump

Ramona Elena Verman (born 3 March 2004) is a Romanian long jumper. She has won two national championships outdoors and two indoors.

== Biography ==
She won her first senior Romanian Indoor Championships in February 2022 in the pentathlon, in Bucharest. A member of CSM Bacāu, she competed in long jump at the 2022 World Athletics U20 Championships in Cali, where she finished in twelfth place.

She won her first senior Romanian Athletics Championships in Craiova in 2023, by winning the long jump competition. She competed at the 2023 European Athletics U20 Championships in Jerusalem, where she finished in tenth place .

She set a new personal best of 6.60 metres to win the 2025 European Athletics U23 Championships in Bergen, Norway, followed by a bronze medal the next week at the 2025 Balkan Championships.

A 6.59m jump was enough to defeat Khaddi Sagnia and reigning European champion Malaika Mihambo at the ISTAF Indoor in Dusseldorf, a World Athletics Indoor Tour Silver meeting, on 24 January 2026. With a jump of 6.69 metres she placed second at the 2026 Romanian Indoor Championships.

She placed sixth at the 2026 World Athletics Indoor Championships in Toruń, Poland by jumping 6.72 metres - a new personal best. In August 2026, she competed at the 2026 European Athletics Championships in Birmingham, England, placing tenth overall.
