= Hilary Kpatcha =

French long jumper (born 1998)

Personal information
- Born: 5 May 1998 (age 28) Lomé, Togo
- Height: 1.75 m (5 ft 9 in)
- Weight: 60 kg (132 lb)

Sport
- Sport: Athletics
- Event: Long jump
- Club: CA Balma
- Coached by: Jean-Luc Senat
Medal record
Women's athletics
Representing France
European Championships
Bronze medal – third place	2026 Birmingham	Long jump
European Games
Silver medal – second place	2023 Kraków-Małopolska	Long jump

Hilary Kpatcha (born 5 May 1998 in Lomé) is a Togolese-born French athlete specialising in the long jump. She represented her country at the 2019 World Championships in Doha without reaching the final. Earlier that year she won a gold medal at the European U23 Championships in Gävle.

Her personal best in the event is 7.02 m (2025).

== International competitions ==
Year	Competition	Venue	Position	Event	Notes
Representing France
2016	World U20 Championships	Bydgoszcz, Poland	3rd	Long jump	6.33 m
2018	Mediterranean U23 Championships	Jesolo, Italy	3rd	Long jump	6.06 m
2019	European U23 Championships	Gävle, Sweden	1st	Long jump	6.73 m
2019	World Championships	Doha, Qatar	18th (q)	Long jump	6.47 m
2023	World Championships	Budapest, Hungary	–	Long jump	NM
2024	European Championships	Rome, Italy	5th	Long jump	6.88 m
2024	Olympic Games	Paris, France	11th	Long jump	6.56 m
2025	World Championships	Tokyo, Japan	4th	Long jump	6.82 m
2026	European Championships	Birmingham, United Kingdom	3rd	Long jump	6.98 m
2026	World Ultimate Championship	Budapest, Hungary	4th	Long jump	6.73 m
