= Liisa-Maria Lusti =

Estonian athletics competitor (born 2004)

Personal information
- Citizenship: Estonia
- Born: August 22, 2004 (age 22)

Achievements and titles
- Personal bests: Heptathlon: 5896 (2025); Pentathlon: 4522 (2025)

Liisa-Maria Lusti (born 22 August 2004) is an Estonian multi-event athlete. She has won multiple national championships, indoors and outdoors in the long jump. She won the pentathlon at the 2026 NCAA Indoor Championships.

== Biography ==
As a 17-year-old, Lusti placed fourth in the heptathlon at the 2022 World Athletics Indoor Championships in Cali, Colombia with a tally of 5.731 points. That year, Lusti won the senior long jump title at the 2022 Estonian Athletics Championships in Tallinn.

Competing indoors, Lusti won the pentathlon title at the Estonian Indoor Combined Events Championships in Tallinn in February 2023. Lusti won the long jump title again in July 2023 at the Estonian Athletics Championships, with a jump of 6.45 metres. The following month, she competed in the heptathlon for Estonia at the 2023 European Athletics U20 Championships in Jerusalem. Lusti retained her long jump title at the 2024 Estonian Championships in Tallinn in June 2024.

In January, Lusti set a new personal best in the pentathlon with 4,522 points. The following month, she won the Estonian Indoor Championships long jump title. That year she set set a personal best in the heptathlon of 5896pts at the Hypo-Meeting in Götzis. In July, she placed sixth in the long jump at the 2025 European Athletics U23 Championships in Bergen, Norway, with a best jump of 6.45 metres, 1 cm below her personal best. The following month, she jumped 6.43 metres to win the long jump at the Estonian Championships.

Competing for the University of Oregon, Lusti won the pentathlon at the 2026 NCAA Indoor Championships with 4498 points. In August 2026, she competed in the long jump at the 2026 European Athletics Championships in Birmingham, England.
