= Taika Koilahti =

Finnish long jumper (born 1998)

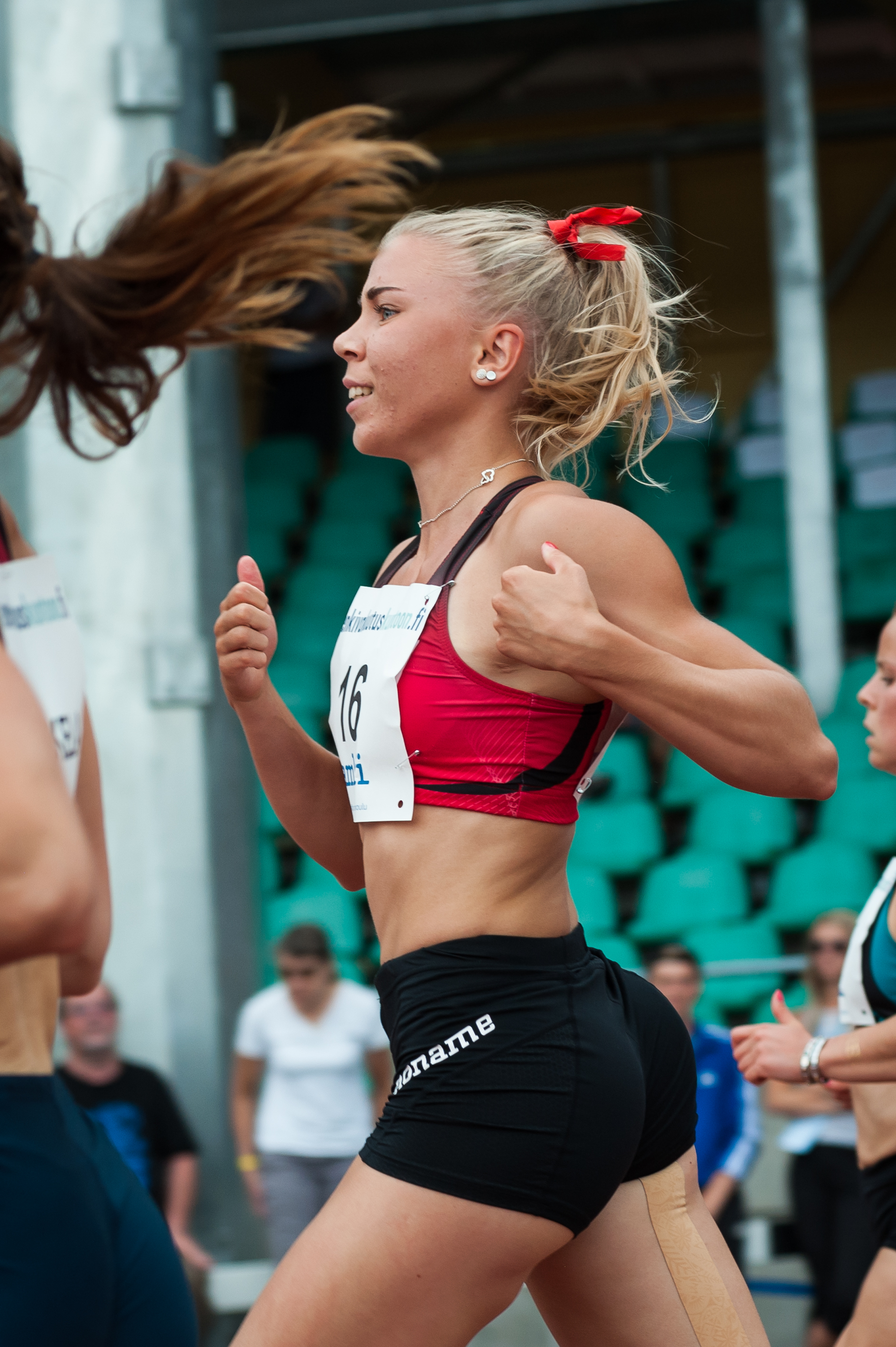
- Taika Koilahti in 2018

Personal information
- Nationality: Finnish
- Born: 4 December 1998 (age 26)

Sport
- Sport: Athletics
- Event: Long jump

Taika Koilahti (born 4 December 1998) is a Finnish athlete. She competed in the women's long jump event at the 2019 World Athletics Championships.
