= Schools International Athletic Board =

The Schools International Athletic Board (SIAB) consists of representatives from the Schools' Athletic Associations of England, Scotland, Wales and All Ireland. The SIAB hosts a very small number of track and field and cross country running competitions annually for elite junior athletes. The English Schools' Athletic Association (ESAA) hosts three major competitions a year for athletes under 15, under 17 and under 19 years of age. The events are cross-country running, a track and field competition and combined events with race walking. Athletes from Wales, Scotland and Ireland take part in their respective national schools' competitions. A very small number of young athletes from each of these countries who do well at their national event, in their respective disciplines at under-15 and under-17 level in Cross Country and Under 17 in Track and Field are selected to compete in an international athletics competition representing their country – England, Scotland, Wales or Ireland – organised by the SIAB. There is also a Combined Events Indoor Pentathlon competitions organised independently by the Scottish Schools' Athletic Association for Under 16 and Under 18 athletes from the four countries. This event was staged for many years in Glasgow at Kelvin Hall but staged at the new Emirates Indoor Stadium for the first time in December 2012.

Meetings include: an international track and field competition for the two under-17 athletes from each country who come first and second in their national competition at each respective discipline; an SIAB international cross country for under-15 and under-17 athletes from each country who come in the top eight in their national Track and Field competitions.

== Elite young athletes ==
The SIAB competitions are one of very few events where junior athletes, especially at under-15 level, can gain international status without achieving senior standards. The SIAB events are extremely elite and the competitions are designed as incentives and a reward to junior athletes for their hard work and commitment to training.

The international athletics events put on by the SIAB are highly regarded and those involved in its organisation have achieved national recognition. The events have provided an opportunity for teenagers in the UK and Ireland to taste international athletics competition for the first time and have in the past provided a platform for such UK international athletes as Steve Cram, Paula Radcliffe, Denise Lewis, Mo Farah, Darren Campbell and Colin Jackson.

== See also ==
- Talented Athlete Scholarship Scheme
