= Plamena Mitkova =

Bulgarian athlete (born 2004)

Personal information
- Nationality: Bulgaria
- Born: 18 September 2004 (age 21)

Sport
- Sport: Track and Field
- Event: Long jump

Achievements and titles
- Personal bests: Long jump: 6.97m (Veliko Tarnovo, 2024)
Medal record
Women's athletics
Representing Bulgaria
World U20 Championships
Gold medal – first place	2022 Cali	Long Jump
European U20 Championships
Silver medal – second place	2023 Jerusalem	Long Jump

Plamena Mitkova (born 18 September 2004) is a Bulgarian track and field athlete who won the long jump at the World Junior Athletics Championships in 2022. She competed at the 2024 Summer Olympics.

== Career ==
=== 2022 ===
Mitkova won the Bulgarian national title in July 2022, jumping 6.19m in the Stadion Ivaylo in Veliko Tarnovo. In August, 2022 Mitkova triumphed in the long jump at the World Jumior Athletics Championships, jumping a personal best 6.66m.

=== 2023 ===
She competed at the 2023 European Athletics Indoor Championships in Istanbul, jumping 6.25 metres without qualifying for the final. Mitkova won silver in the long jump at the 2023 European Athletics U20 Championships in Jerusalem with a jump of 6.54 metres.

=== 2024 ===
Competing at the 2024 European Athletics Championships in Rome, she finished in 7th place with a personal best jump of 6.80 metres. Later that month, she won the Bulgarian title national with a personal best distance of 6.97 metres in Veliko Tarnovo. She competed in the long jump at the 2024 Paris Olympics.

=== 2025 ===
She competed at the 2025 European Athletics Indoor Championships in Apeldoorn, Netherlands in March 2025, where she qualified for the final and placed sixth overall. In the final she jumped 6.63 metres with her second jump, and matched it again in her final jump.

She was selected for the 2025 World Athletics Indoor Championships in Nanjing later on in March 2025, where she placed fourth overall. However, despite jumping 6.63 metres with her first jump - which was enough for fourth place overall - she suffered an injury that required her to be taken from the track in a wheelchair. Her coach, Ivaylo Roussenov, speaking after the championships confirmed that the injury sustained was a torn right calf muscle which he described as being a centimetre long.

In September 2025, she competed at the 2025 World Championships in Tokyo, Japan.

== Personal life ==
Mitkova is from Plovdiv.

Mitkova also has a brother named Dimitar.
