= Irati Mitxelena =

Spanish long jumper (born 1998)

Personal information
- Born: 3 July 1998 (age 27)

Sport
- Sport: Athletics
- Event: Long jump

Achievements and titles
- Personal best(s): Long jump: 6.76m (San Sebastian, 2026)

Irati Mitxelena (born 3 July 1998) is a Spanish long jumper. She won the Spanish Athletics Championships in 2023 and competed at the 2025 World Athletics Championships.

== Biography ==
Initially a judo practitioner, Mitxelena came to athletics relatively late, but won the Spanish Under-20 Championship in the triple jump before focusing purely on the long jump. She competed for Spain in the junior level, including at the 2019 European Athletics U23 Championships.

She won the senior Spanish Athletics Championships in Nerja in 2022. That year, she competed for Spain at the 2022 European Athletics Championships in Munich, Germany, missing a place in the final by 10 centimetres and placing fifteenth overall.

In March 2025, she represented Spain at the 2025 European Athletics Indoor Championships in Apeldoorn, Netherlands. In August 2025, while competing in Guadalajara. Mitxelena jumped 6.70m, a new personal best. In September, she competed at the 2025 World Championships in Tokyo, Japan, without advancing to the final.

In January 2026, she set a new personal best of 6.76 metres in the long jump while competing at the Gipuzkoa Championships in San Sebastián. However, as a non-ratified event by World Athletics the distance, an automatic qualifying standard for the 2026 World Indoor Championships, did not count for the rankings. The following month, she jumped 6.70 metres to finish runner-up at the World Athletics Indoor Tour event in Madrid. In February 2026, she also finished runner-up at the Spanish Indoor Championships in Valencia, although she was leading the competition prior to the final jump of Fatima Diame. She place twelfth at the 2026 World Athletics Indoor Championships in Toruń, Poland.

== Personal life ==
She is from San Sebastian in the Basque Country and outside athletics works in neuroscience having studied in the United States at the University of Cincinnati between 2016 and 2020 and completed a master's degree in Spain in 2021.
