= Jazmin Sawyers =

British athlete

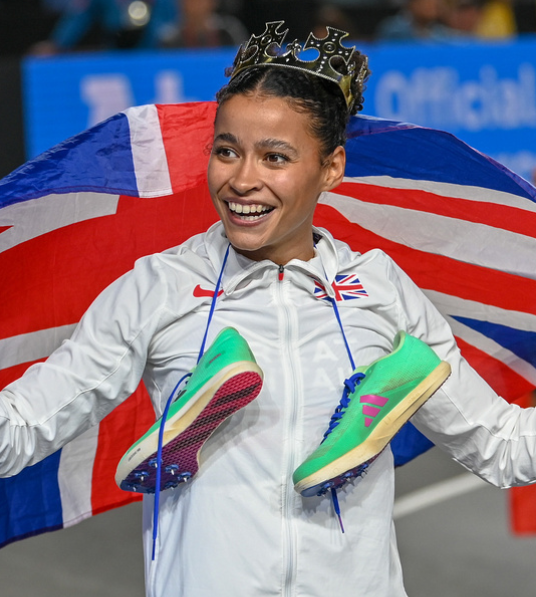
- Sawyers at the 2023 European Indoor Championships in Istanbul

Personal information
- Born: 21 May 1994 (age 32) Stoke-on-Trent, England
- Education: University of Bristol
- Height: 1.62 m (5 ft 4 in)
- Weight: 60 kg (132 lb)

Sport
- Country: Great Britain; England
- Sport: Athletics
- Event: Long jump
- Coached by: Aston Moore

Achievements and titles
- Personal bests: 6.96 m (Birmingham 2026); Indoors; 7.00 m NR (Istanbul 2023)
Medal record
Women's athletics
Representing Great Britain
World Ultimate Championship
Runner-up	2026 Budapest	Long jump
European Championships
Silver medal – second place	2016 Amsterdam	Long jump
Silver medal – second place	2026 Birmingham	Long jump
Bronze medal – third place	2022 Munich	Long jump
European Indoor Championships
Gold medal – first place	2023 Istanbul	Long jump
European U23 Championships
Silver medal – second place	2015 Tallinn	Long jump
World Junior Championships
Bronze medal – third place	2012 Barcelona	Long jump
European Junior Championships
Silver medal – second place	2013 Rieti	Long jump
Representing England
Commonwealth Games
Gold medal – first place	2026 Glasgow	Long jump
Silver medal – second place	2014 Glasgow	Long jump
Commonwealth Youth Games
Gold medal – first place	2011 Isle of Man	Long jump
Gold medal – first place	2011 Isle of Man	4 × 100 m relay
Women's bobsleigh
Representing Great Britain
Winter Youth Olympics
Silver medal – second place	2012 Innsbruck	Bobsleigh

Jazmin Sawyers (born 21 May 1994) is a British track and field athlete and sports presenter who competes in the long jump, representing Great Britain and England. She won her first major senior international title at the 2023 European Indoor Championships, and her first major senior outdoor title at the 2026 Commonwealth Games.

Sawyers won the silver at the 2014 Commonwealth Games. She has claimed two silvers representing Great Britain at the 2016 and 2026 European Championships, as well as a bronze in 2022. Sawyers competed at both the 2016 Rio and the 2020 Tokyo Olympics, finishing eighth in the event on both occasions.

As a junior, she won bronze in the long jump at the 2012 World Junior Championships and silver at the 2013 European Junior Championships. Sawyers earned silver at the 2015 European Under-23 Championships. She is a double gold medallist, in long jump and sprint relay, from the 2011 Commonwealth Youth Games.

Sawyers is a five-time national champion. She is the British indoor record holder for the long jump with an outright best of 7.00 m. She has also competed for Great Britain as a bobsledder and a heptathlete. Sawyer won a silver medal at the Winter Youth Olympic Games in Innsbruck in 2012 in bobsleigh.

Outside of sport, Sawyers is also a musician, and competed in the sixth series of The Voice UK.

== Early life ==
Jazmin Sawyers was born in Stoke-on-Trent to a Jamaican father and an English mother, who later became the Chief Constable of Staffordshire. She was initially a child gymnast, participating in the sport from the age of four. At ten years old she began to take part in athletics events at school and decided to start practising in various events.

Sawyers studied for a degree in law at Bristol University, graduating with a 2:1.

== Athletics career ==
As part of City of Stoke Athletics Club, Sawyers focused mainly on high jump and long jump. At the 2007 English Schools Championships she was the high jump runner-up with a personal best of 1.70 m (5 ft 6 3/4 in), finishing behind Katarina Johnson-Thompson. The following year, Sawyers won the English Schools' titles in the long jump and the pentathlon – a feat she repeated in 2009. In 2010, she won a scholarship to study at Millfield public school.

=== Youth and junior medals ===
Sawyer's first international appearances came in 2011. At the World Youth Championships, she placed ninth in the heptathlon. She cleared six metres in the long jump for the first time that year and surpassed that mark to win the gold in the event at the Commonwealth Youth Games. She was also a 4 × 100 metres relay champion with England at that event.

Sawyers' bobsleigh training at the start of 2012 meant she was ill-prepared for heptathlon in the summer. She opted to focus on the long jump instead, as this combined well with the explosive strength training she had undertaken for the winter sport. This proved to be a successful switch as she set a personal best and world-leading junior mark of 6.64 m (21 ft 9 1/4 in) to place third at the British Championships. Sawyers was the bronze medallist at the World Junior Championships – her distance of 6.67 m (21 ft 10 1/2 in) was beaten only by the wind-assisted jumps of British rival Katerina Johnson-Thompson and Germany's Lena Malkus. Sawyers' performance was the second best wind-legal jump by a junior woman that year.

She gained a place at the University of Sheffield and began training there as well with local coach Toni Minichiello. She continued her focus on the long jump into the 2013 season. Sawyers was runner-up at the BUCS University Championships indoor and outdoors. She repeated that placing at her two major events that year, taking silver behind Shara Proctor at the UK Championships then another silver at the European Junior Championships behind Malaika Mihambo of Germany. At the end of the track and field season, Sawyers won her first meet abroad at the Gugl Games in Linz, Austria. She changed university to study law and criminology at Bristol University. She based her training near the University of Bath, however, working with coach and former long jumper Alan Lerwill.

=== 2014-2019: Commonwealth silver and Olympic debut ===
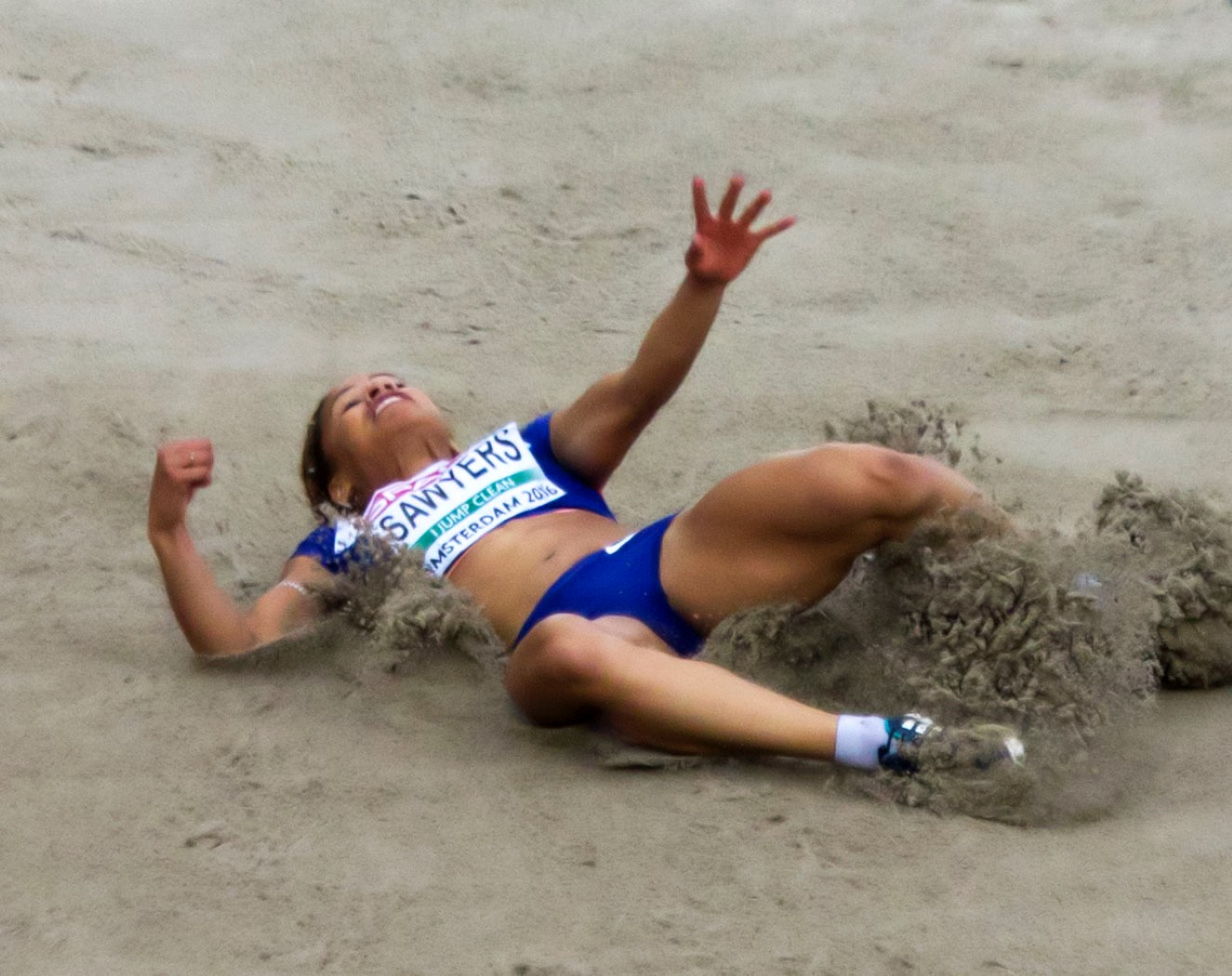
Sawyers lands after her jump at the 2016 European Athletics Championships in Amsterdam

At the start of 2014, Sawyers set an indoor best of 6.44 m (21 ft 1 1/2 in) to place second to Johnson-Thompson at the British Indoor Championships. Outdoors, she had a string of victories (including a win at the Universities Championships) in the buildup to the European Team Championships, where she placed ninth overall. Sawyers was again second best to Johnson-Thompson at the outdoor National Championships but both gained selection for the long jump for England at the 2014 Commonwealth Games. However, Johnson-Thompson withdrew prior to the championships and the other leading English athlete Proctor could not compete in the final due to injury, making Sawyer's England's leading medal hope. At the competition in Glasgow her final round jump of 6.54 m (21 ft 5 1/4 in) was a season's best and resulted in a silver medal – her first international senior medal and just two centimetres behind winner Ese Brume.

In July 2015, Sawyers jumped a personal best of 6.71 m (22 ft 0 in) to win silver behind Malaika Mihambo at the European U23 Championships in Tallinn.

The following year, she improved her personal best to 6.75 in winning the British Championships. At the European Championships in July, Sawyers won a silver medal in the long jump, her first senior continental medal, having jumped a wind-assisted 6.86 m (22 ft 6 in) (+2.8). She went on to compete at the Rio Olympics in August, where she placed eighth in the final of the long jump.

Sawyers competed at the 2018 Commonwealth Games on the Gold Coast in April of that year, where she finished seventh. Later that year, she improved her personal best to 6.86 m in finishing second behind Lorraine Ugen at the British Championships. In August, she finished fourth at the European Championships in Berlin.

=== 2020–2022: European silver medal ===
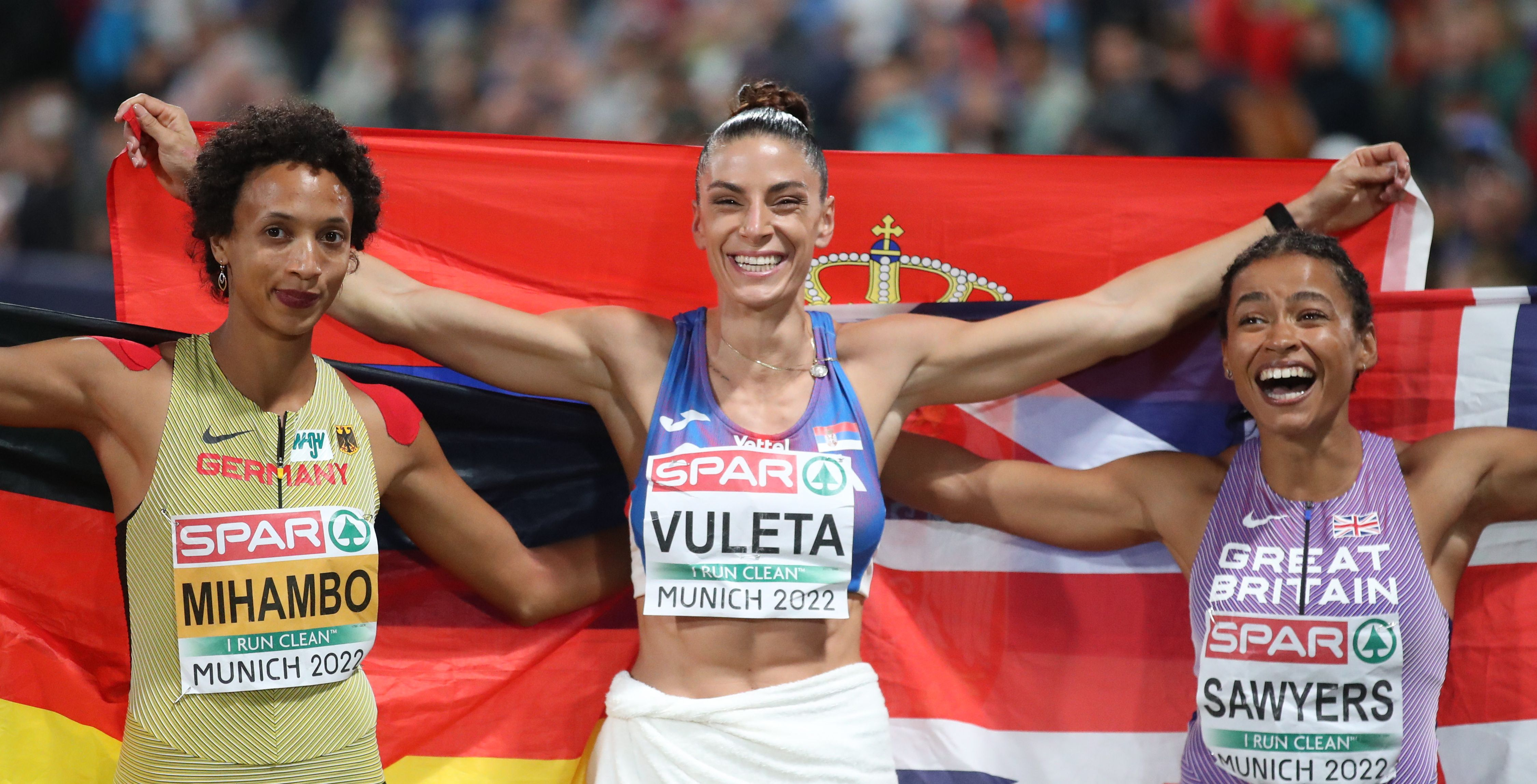
Sawyers (right) with Ivana Vuleta and Malaika Mihambo after the long jump at the 2022 European Championships.

Sawyers became a triple British champion when winning the long jump event at the 2020 Outdoor British Championships with a jump of 6.69 metres. At the delayed 2020 Summer Olympics, held in Tokyo in 2021, Sawyers finished eighth in the final with a distance of 6.80 metres.

At the 2022 World Championships in Eugene, Oregon, she was in third position after all finalists had made their first jump, but was pushed just outside the top eight when the eventual winner Malaika Mihambo made her first valid jump at the third attempt. She ended in ninth place with a distance of 6.62. At the Munich European Championships that year, Sawyers was in fourth position after five attempts. Ukraine's Maryna Bekh-Romanchuk was in third with 6.76 until Sawyers snatched bronze with 6.80 in the last round, reversing the outcome of 2018 when Bekh-Romanchuk displaced Sawyers from the podium with her last jump of the competition.

=== 2023–2024: first major senior title and Olympic injury heartbreak ===
In March 2023, Sawyers captained Great Britain at the European Indoor Championships held in Istanbul. She qualified for the final with her first jump, and went on to jump 7.00 m to win gold, setting a national indoor record and outright best in the process.

In August 2023, Sawyers failed to qualify for the final of the World Athletics Championships long jump.

On 25 April 2024, Sawyers announced she had undergone surgery after rupturing the Achilles on her take-off leg and would subsequently miss the Paris 2024 Olympics. She was one of the team of BBC commentators at the Olympic Games for the Athletics.

=== 2025–present: return from injury and medals at major events ===
On 30 May 2025, Sawyers jumped 6.89 m - her second longest outdoor jump of her career - at the Tsatoumas Street Long Jump in Kalamata, finishing behind Hilary Kpatcha who jumped 7.02 m. She won her fifth British outdoor title in the long jump at the UK Championships in August of that year.

On 1 August 2026, Sawyers won the gold medal at the Commonwealth Games in Glasgow with a wind-assisted jump of 6.93 metres. Following her win, she stated "The feeling is overwhelming. I will do the horrible bits 100 times over, I'll do it and do it and do it. This is amazing". Later that month, on 16 August, she won the silver medal at the European Championships in Birmingham with a wind-assisted jump of 6.99 metres. Her jump of 6.96 metres, with a wind reading of 1.3 metres per second, in the second round of that competition, represented a new wind-legal outdoor personal best. Sawyers ended her 2026 season with the runners-up place at the inaugural World Athletics Ultimate Championship. Although no medals are awarded in this championship, Sawyers earned a $75,000 prize for her second place finish.

== Bobsleigh career ==
In 2011, Sawyers was approached by the British Bobsleigh and Skeleton Association to train for the inaugural Youth Winter Olympics. Acting as brakewoman, she formed a two-man bob team with Mica McNeill. In January 2012 she represented Great Britain at the bobsleigh at the 2012 Winter Youth Olympics and Sawyers and McNeill became the country's first ever medal-winning team at the competition (and the only medallists for Britain that year), taking the silver medals behind the Dutch team. As a result, she was chosen as one of the carriers for the 2012 Olympic torch relay.

== Other activities ==
Sawyers is a singer/songwriter in her spare time and, in February 2017 appeared in ITV's The Voice UK. She was successful in securing Will.i.am as her coach during the 'blind auditions', though she told the programme her main priority remained with athletics. She was eliminated from the programme on 26 February in a sing-off against fellow singer Hayley Eccles. Sawyers was an Ambassador for Right To Play, the world's leading sport for development charity. She visited Right To Play's education programme in Tanzania in 2018.

== Statistics ==
=== Personal bests ===
- Long jump – 6.96 m (22 ft 10 in) (Birmingham, UK 2026)
  - Long jump indoor – 7.00 m (22 ft 11 1/2 in) (Istanbul 2023) NR

=== International competitions ===
Representing Great Britain / England
Year	Competition	Venue	Position	Event	Result
2011	World Youth Championships	Villeneuve-d'Ascq, France	9th	Heptathlon	5296 pts
2011	Commonwealth Youth Games	Douglas, Isle of Man	1st	Long jump	6.27 m w
2011	Commonwealth Youth Games	Douglas, Isle of Man	1st	4 × 100 m relay	46.19
2012	Winter Youth Olympics	Innsbruck, Austria	2nd	Two-girls bobsleigh	1:51.95
2012	World Junior Championships	Barcelona, Spain	3rd	Long jump	6.67 m WJL
2013	European Junior Championships	Rieti, Italy	2nd	Long jump	6.63 m SB
2014	Commonwealth Games	Glasgow, United Kingdom	2nd	Long jump	6.54 m SB
2015	European U23 Championships	Tallinn, Estonia	2nd	Long jump	6.71 m PB
2016	World Indoor Championships	Portland, OR, United States	13th	Long jump	6.31 m
2016	European Championships	Amsterdam, Netherlands	2nd	Long jump	6.86 m w
2016	Olympic Games	Rio de Janeiro, Brazil	8th	Long jump	6.69 m
2017	European Indoor Championships	Belgrade, Serbia	6th	Long jump	6.67 m
2017	World Championships	London, United Kingdom	20th (q)	Long jump	6.34 m
2018	Commonwealth Games	Gold Coast, Australia	7th	Long jump	6.35 m
2018	European Championships	Berlin, Germany	4th	Long jump	6.67 m
2019	European Indoor Championships	Glasgow, United Kingdom	17th (q)	Long jump	6.28 m
2019	World Championships	Doha, Qatar	19th (q)	Long jump	6.46 m
2021	European Indoor Championships	Toruń, Poland	13th (q)	Long jump	6.48 m
2021	Olympic Games	Tokyo, Japan	8th	Long jump	6.80 m
2022	World Championships	Eugene, OR, United States	9th	Long jump	6.62 m
2022	Commonwealth Games	Birmingham, United Kingdom	4th	Long jump	6.84 m SB
2022	European Championships	Munich, Germany	3rd	Long jump	6.80 m
2023	European Indoor Championships	Istanbul, Turkey	1st	Long jump	7.00 m WL,NR
2023	World Championships	Budapest, Hungary	22nd (q)	Long jump	6.41 m
2025	World Championships	Tokyo, Japan	16th (q)	Long jump	6.54 m
2026	Commonwealth Games	Glasgow, United Kingdom	1st	Long jump	6.93 m SB
2026	European Championships	Birmingham, United Kingdom	2nd	Long jump	6.99 m SB
2026	World Ultimate Championship	Budapest, Hungary	2nd	Long jump	6.78 m

=== National titles ===
- British Athletics Championships
  - Long jump: 2016, 2020, 2021, 2023, 2025
- British Indoor Athletics Championships
  - Long jump: 2016, 2023
