= Anna Matuszewicz =

Polish athlete (born 2003)

Personal information
- Nationality: Polish
- Born: 5 April 2003 (age 23)

Sport
- Sport: Athletics
- Event: Long jump

Achievements and titles
- Personal best: Long jump: 6.77 m (2026)

Anna Matuszewicz (born 5 April 2003) is a Polish long jumper. She is a multiple-time national indoor champion, and in 2026 became the Polish indoor national record holder.

== Early life ==
Matuszewicz took part in many sports when she was growing up, including horse riding, fencing and volleyball, but focused on athletics.

== Career ==
She is a member of MKL Toruń. She set a personal best of 5.91 metres indoors in February 2020. In 2021, she improved it indoors to 6.33 to secure the Polish U20 Indoor Championship. She jumped 6.49 metres as an eighteen year-old in Lublin in July 2021. It was the best result for a Polish junior in 57 years since Irena Szewińska.

The following year, she won the long jump title at the Polish Indoor Athletics Championships for the first time, at the age of 19 years-old. She finished fifth at the 2022 World Athletics U20 Championships in Cali, Colombia with a jump of 6.31 metres.

She won the long jump title at the Polish Indoor Athletics Championships in 2024. She retained her title in 2025 with a new personal best of 6.71 metres to move to eighth on the Polish all-time list. She competed at the 2025 European Athletics Indoor Championships in Apeldoorn. She was selected for the 2025 World Athletics Indoor Championships in Nanjing in March 2025. In September 2025, she competed at the 2025 World Championships in Tokyo, Japan.

Competing at the Gorzow Jump Festival, a World Athletics Indoor Tour Silver meeting, on 31 January 2026, she won the long jump with an outright lifetime best of 6.77m breaking the Polish national indoor long jump record of 6.74m, set by Anna Wlodarczyk in 1980. She won the title at the 2026 Polish Indoor Athletics Championships, with a jump of 6.59 metres. She placed ninth at the 2026 World Athletics Indoor Championships in Toruń, Poland.
