= Milica Gardašević =

Serbian long jumper (born 1998)

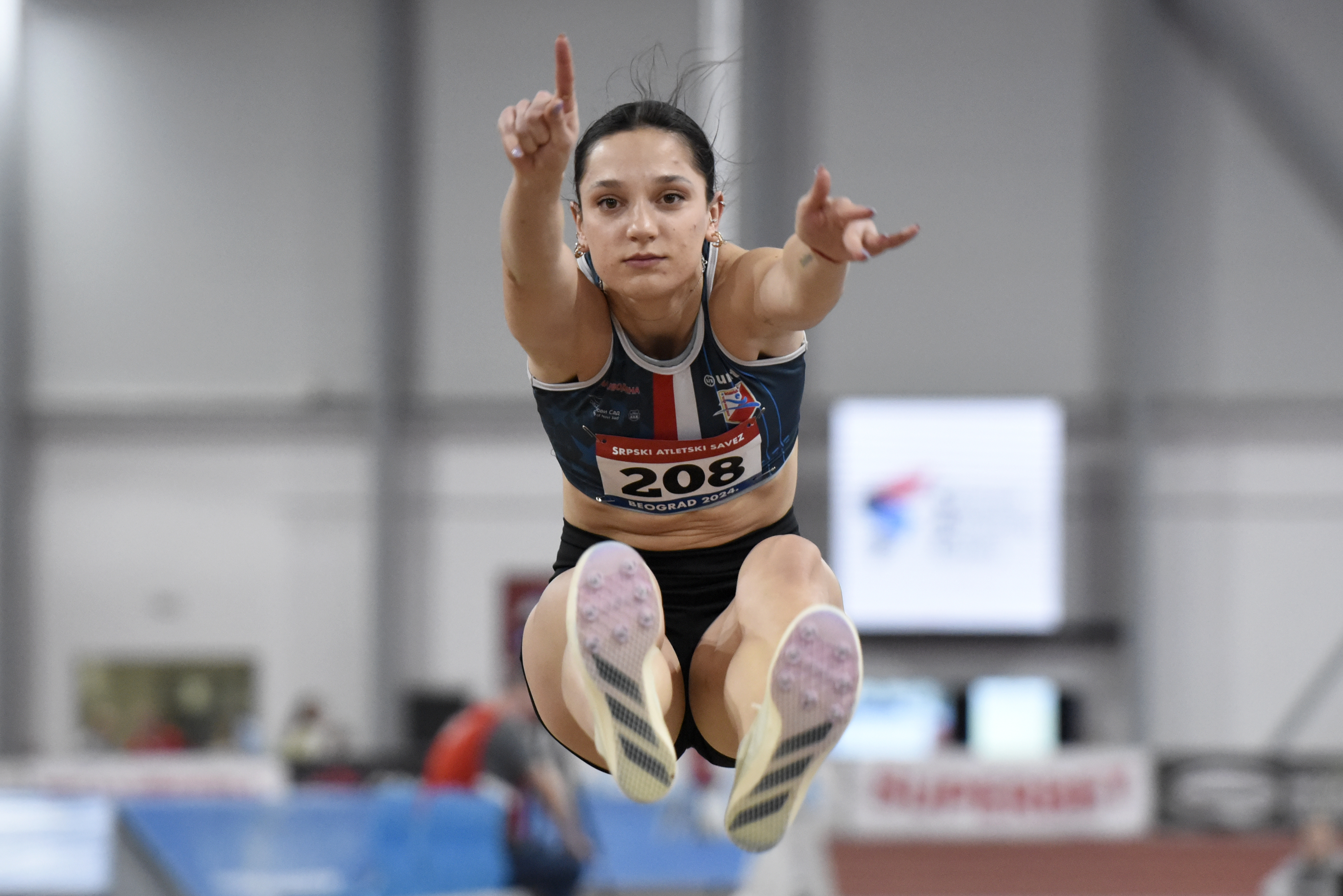
- Gardašević at the indoor championship of Serbia in 2024

Personal information
- Nationality: Serbian
- Born: 28 September 1998 (age 27) Novi Sad, Serbia, FR Yugoslavia
- Height: 1.78 m (5 ft 10 in)
- Weight: 63 kg (139 lb)

Sport
- Country: Serbia
- Sport: Athletics
- Event: Long jump
- Club: AK Vojvodina

Achievements and titles
- Personal best: 6.91 m (2023)
Medal record
World Athletics Indoor Tour
Winner	2024	Long jump
European Games
Gold medal – first place	2023 Kraków-Małopolska	Long jump
Mediterranean Games
Gold medal – first place	2022 Oran	Long jump
European U23 Championships
Bronze medal – third place	2019 Gävle	Long jump
European U20 Championships
Gold medal – first place	2017 Grosseto	Long jump

Milica Gardašević (Serbian Cyrillic: Милица Гардашевић; born 28 September 1998) is a Serbian long jumper. She represented her country in the long jump at the 2024 Summer Olympics.

== Career ==
=== Junior career ===
As a junior, Gardašević won gold at the 2017 European U20 Championships in Grosseto, Italy, jumping 6.46 metres in the final. She got a bronze medal at the 2019 European U23 Championships, after which the Mayor of Novi Sad hosted a reception for her.

=== Senior career ===
Gardašević won a gold medal at the 2022 Mediterranean Games. In 2022 Gardašević participated in the World Athletics Championships but did not record a valid distance in three attempts. A few days before that year's European Championships, she recorded her personal best in the long jump, with a distance of 6.83 metres.

In July 2023 she won the women's long jump at the 2023 Balkan Athletics Championships, jumping 6.91 metres to qualify for the following year's Summer Olympics. The distance she recorded became her new personal best in the event.

Gardašević competed in the 2024 Summer Olympics in Paris, France. After recording a jump of 6.48 metres in the first round of qualifying for the long jump, she failed to record valid jumps at the second and third attempt, leaving her outside of the top 12 athletes qualifying for the final.

In March 2025, Gardašević took part in the European Indoor Championships, jumping four fouls but finishing with a distance of 6.75 metres to finish outside of the podium places in fourth. Later the same month Gardašević competed at the 2025 World Indoor Championships, finishing 13th as she only landed one of her three jumps to end up with a longest mark of 6.33 metres.
