= 2021 British Athletics Championships =

British Athletics Championships in 2021

- Dates: 25–27 June
- Host city: Manchester, United Kingdom
- Venue: Manchester Regional Arena
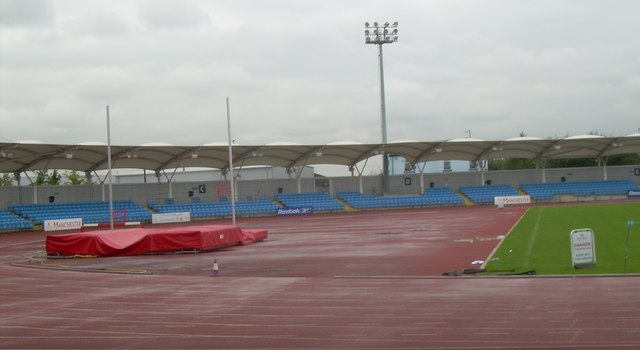
- Level: Senior
- Type: Outdoor

The 2021 British Athletics Championships was the national championships in outdoor track and field for athletes in the United Kingdom, which also served as the main qualifying event for athletics competitors for the delayed 2020 Summer Olympics. In addition, the Championships included a number of parasports events, with a total of 36 competitors in these competitions. On 29 June 2021, UK Athletics announced 65 athletes that would compete for Team GB at the Olympics, taking the total number of British athletics competitors at the Games to 72. In July 2021, four more athletes qualified for the Games based on their World Athletics rankings.

== Background ==
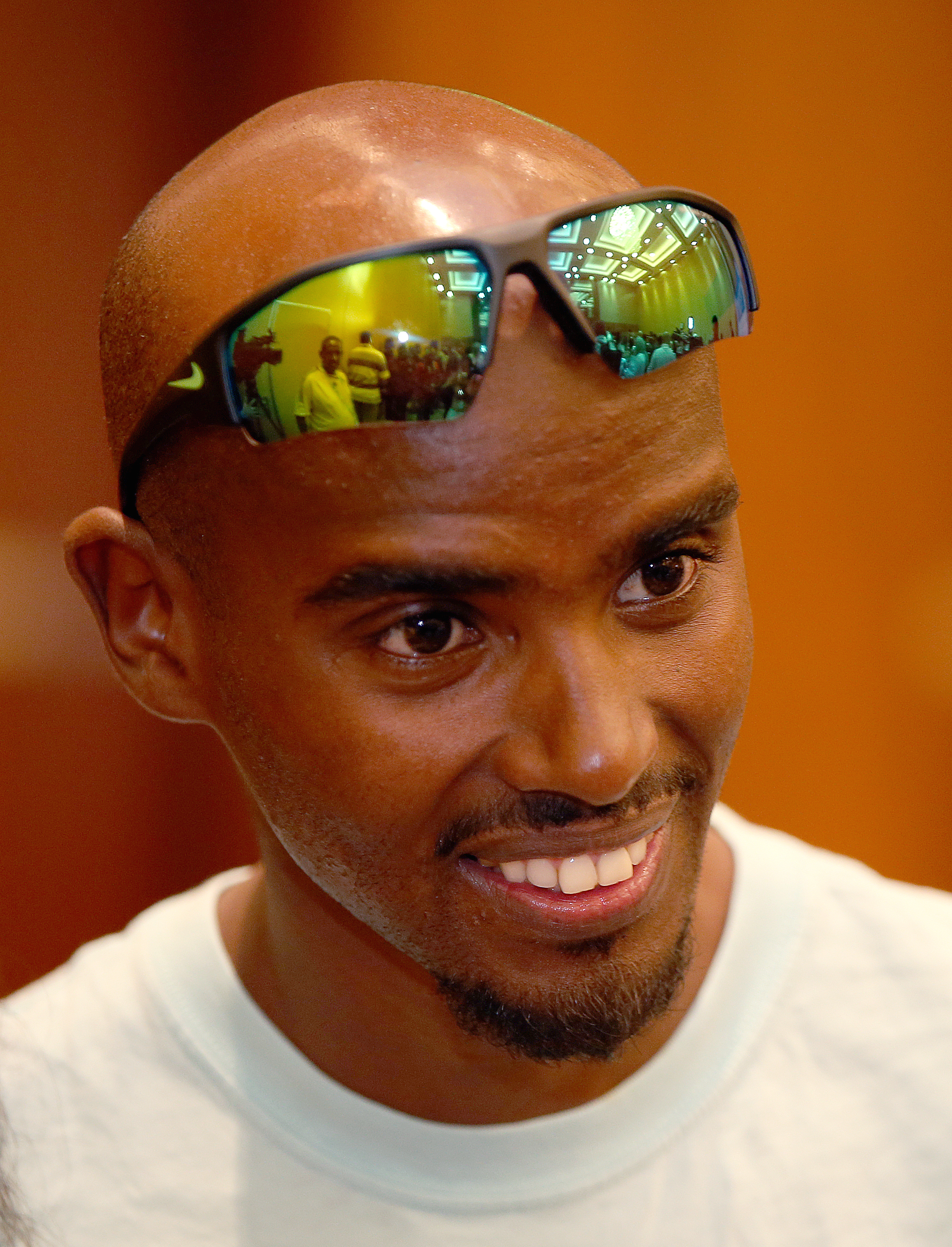
Mo Farah failed to attain the Olympic qualifying time for the 10,000m.

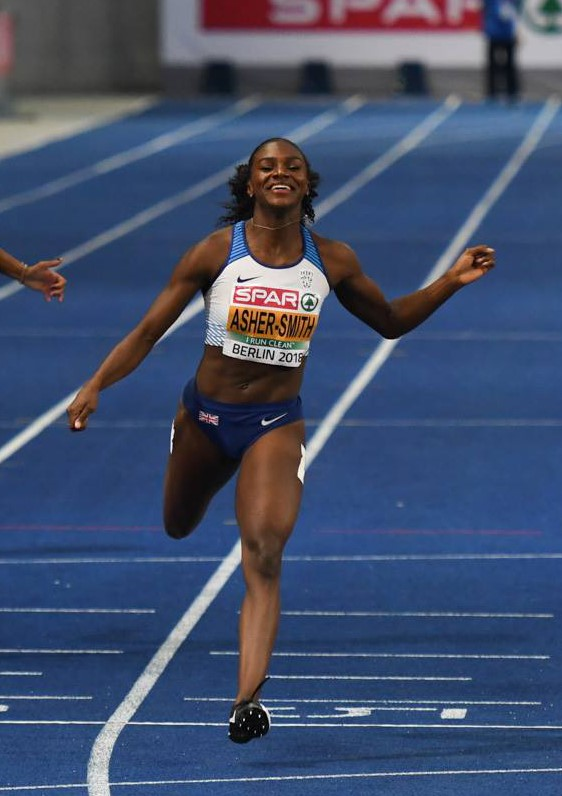
Dina Asher-Smith won the 100m event at the Championships, and also received Olympic places in the 200m and 4 × 100 m relay events.

The 2021 British Athletics Championships were held between 25 and 27 June 2021 at the Manchester Regional Arena. Manchester has the rights to host the Championships from 2020 until 2022. Due to COVID-19 pandemic related capacity limits, the number of fans were limited to 1,500 per day.

The Championships served as the trial event for competitors to qualify for the 2020 Summer Olympics. In order to guarantee selection for the Olympics, competitors had to finish in the top two places at the Championships, and also have achieved the Olympic qualification standard. UK Athletics then awarded any unfilled selections with competitors of their choice.

Olympic qualification for the marathon and 20 kilometres race walk events were determined following a separate trial event in Kew Gardens, London, in March 2021. A separate 10,000 metres qualification event was held on 5 April in Birmingham, as part of the 2021 European 10,000m Cup. Typically, the Night of 10,000m PBs event in Highgate, London, is used as the British Championships event for this distance, but that event was cancelled in 2021 due to the COVID-19 pandemic. After Mo Farah failed to reach the Olympic qualifying standard at the 10,000 metres trial event, UK Athletics decided to organise a one-off event at the 2021 British Athletics Championships, to give Farah a final chance to qualify for the Olympics. The competition contained international runners and pacemakers.

The Championships also included a number of parasports events. The events included were the 100 metres and 400 metres mixed classes races, as well as shot put, discus, long jump, high jump and javelin field events. A total of 36 athletes competed, some of whom had been included in the British squad for the delayed 2020 Summer Paralympics the previous week.

For the first time in the 21st century, the British Athletics Championships were not broadcast on live television, as the BBC and UK Athletics did not reach a broadcasting rights deal. The Championships were instead broadcast on the UK Athletics website and YouTube channel. Several athletes including Dina Asher-Smith were critical of this decision.

On 29 June 2021, UK Athletics announced 65 athletes to compete for Team GB at the delayed 2020 Summer Olympics, based on performances at the Championships. Including the marathon and 20 km walk competitors, it meant that 72 Britons were chosen to compete in athletics at the Games. On 2 July 2021, four more athletes were awarded places by World Athletics, based on their rankings.

== Highlights ==
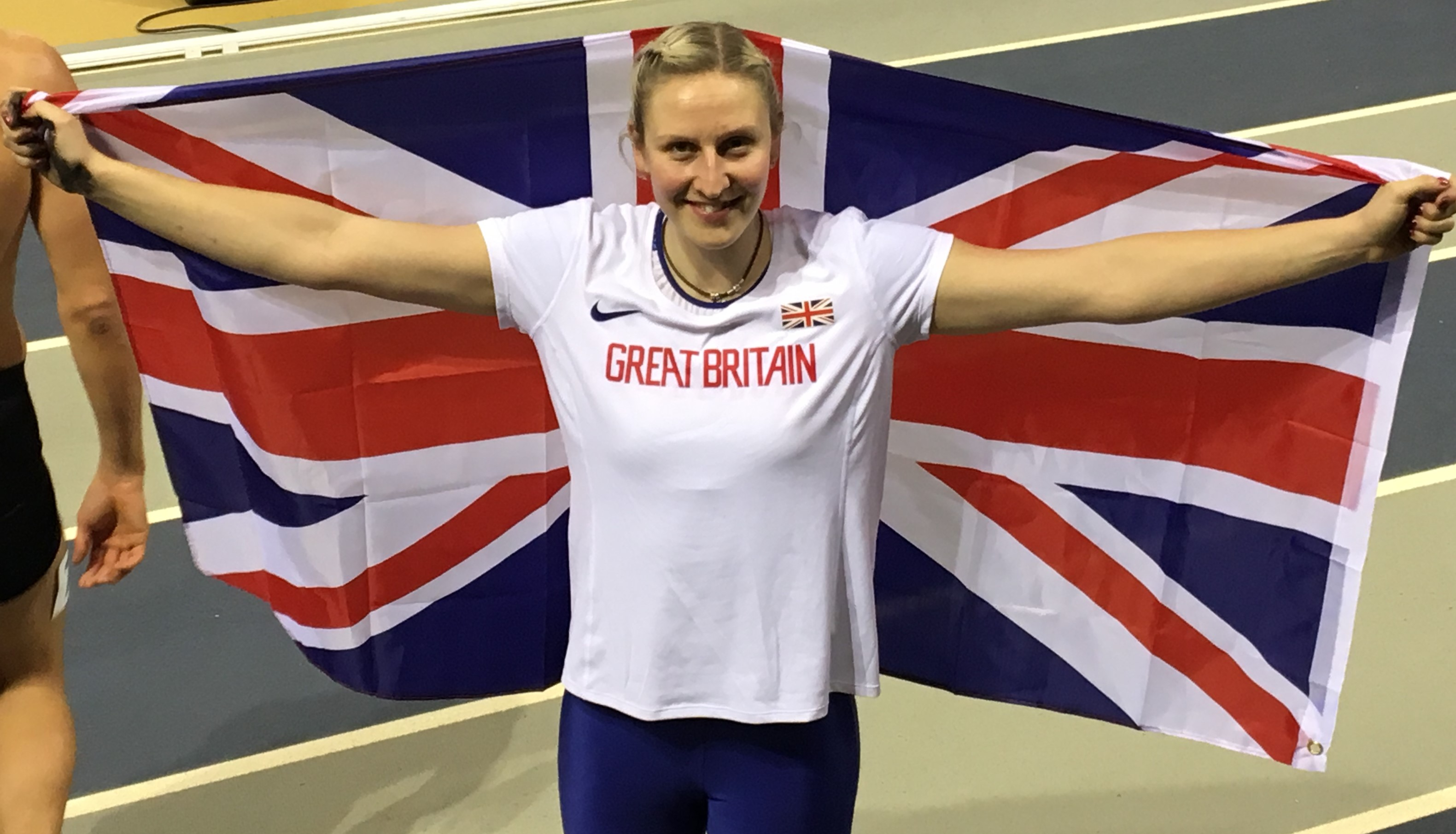
Pole vaulter Holly Bradshaw won her ninth British title and broke her own national record.

Mo Farah finished the 10,000 metres race in a time of 27:47.04, 19 seconds slower than the Olympic qualification standard. As such, he failed to qualify for the Olympic 10,000 metres event.

The women's 800 metres race featured five athletes who had previously attained the Olympic qualifying standard: Jemma Reekie, Laura Muir, Alexandra Bell, Keely Hodgkinson and Adelle Tracey. Hodgkinson finished first, in a time of 1:59:61. Reekie finished second and Muir was the third finisher. Muir was initially selected alongside Hodgkinson and Reekie for the Games, though she later decided not to compete in the 800 metres event at the Olympics, as she wanted to focus on the 1500 metres race. Her place was reallocated to Alexandra Bell.

Pole vaulter Holly Bradshaw was aiming for her ninth British title, and seventh in a row. She won the event with a British record of 4.90 metres, beating her own previous outdoor record by 8 centimetres (3.1 in).

Dina Asher-Smith won the women's 100 metre event. She was originally clocked in a national record time of 10.71 seconds, although this was later corrected to 10.97 seconds, which did not beat the previous record. Asher-Smith qualified to compete in the 100 and 200 metres individual events, and the 4 x 100 metres relay.

Jodie Williams won the 200 and 400 metres races, the first time since 2005 that a woman has won both events.

The men's 800 metres race was a close finish, with the top three separated by 0.03 seconds. Elliot Giles won the event, ahead of Oliver Dustin and Daniel Rowden. All three athletes were later selected for the Olympics.

== Results ==
Key: Q – qualified for the 2020 Summer Olympics.

=== Men ===
Event	Gold		Silver		Bronze	
100 metres	Chijindu Ujah Q	10.05s	Eugene Amo-Dadzie	10.07s	Jona Efoloko	10.30s PB
200 metres	Adam Gemili Q	20.63s	Nethaneel Mitchell-Blake Q (Note: Awarded a place based on World Athletics ranking.)	20.77s	Jona Efoloko	20.79s SB
400 metres	Niclas Baker	46.05s PB	Cameron Chalmers	46.19s	Michael Ohioze	46.42s
800 metres	Elliot Giles Q	1:45.11	Oliver Dustin Q	1:45.12	Daniel Rowden Q	1:45.14
1500 metres	Josh Kerr Q	3:40.72	Jake Wightman Q	3:40.77	Jake Heyward Q	3:42.41
5000 metres	Patrick Dever	13:37.30	Andrew Butchart Q	13:38.16	Jack Rowe	13:38.81
10,000 metres invitational event	Mo Farah	27:47.04 SB	Zerei Kbrom (NOR)	27:57.63 PB	Félix Bour (FRA)	27:59.31
110 metres hurdles	Tade Ojora	13.38s SB	David King Q	13.51s	Andrew Pozzi Q	13.54s
400 metres hurdles	Alastair Chalmers	49.98	Alex Knibbs	50.33	Jacob Paul	51.30
3000 metres steeplechase	Mark Pearce	8:24.83 SB	Zak Seddon Q	8:25.08 SB	Phil Norman Q	8:31.87
5000 metres walk	Tom Bosworth	19:25.62 SB	Cameron Corbishley	20:37.69 SB	Guy Thomas	21:31.16 PB
Long jump	Alex Farquharson	7.69m	James Lelliot	7.69m	Reynold Banigo	7.65m
High jump	Tom Gale Q	2.24m	Joel Clarke-Khan	2.21m PB	David Smith	2.17m
Triple jump	Ben Williams Q	16.37m SB	Nathan Douglas	16.20m	Efe Uwaifo	16.06m
Pole vault	Harry Coppell Q	5.70m SB	Adam Hague	5.15m SB	Lazarus Benjamin	5.15m
Shot put	Scott Lincoln Q	20.22m	Patrick Swan	16.98m	Daniel Cork	16.61m
Discus throw	Lawrence Okoye Q	61.71m	Nicholas Percy	60.17m	Greg Thompson	58.31m
Hammer throw	Taylor Campbell Q	75.10m SB	Chris Bennett	73.53m	Craig Murch	70.90m
Javelin throw	Daniel Bainbridge	72.66m	Joe Harris	72.65m SB	Greg Millar	71.90m PB
Decathlon	Tim Duckworth	7447 PB	Lewis Church	7308	Harry Kendall	7249

In addition, Adam Gemili, Zharnel Hughes, Richard Kilty, Nethaneel Mitchell-Blake, Reece Prescod and CJ Ujah were selected for the men's 4 x 100 metres relay. Niclas Baker, Cameron Chalmers, Matthew Hudson-Smith, Michael Ohioze and Lee Thompson were chosen for the men's 4 x 400 metres relay.

=== Women ===
Event	Gold		Silver		Bronze	
100 metres	Dina Asher-Smith Q	10.97s	Asha Philip Q	11.16s SB	Daryll Neita Q	11.21s
200 metres	Jodie Williams	23.02s SB	Beth Dobbin Q	23.07s	Desirèe Henry	23.18s SB
400 metres	Jodie Williams Q	51.02s	Nicole Yeargin Q	51.26s	Ama Pipi Q	51.33s
800 metres	Keely Hodgkinson Q	1:59.61	Jemma Reekie Q	2:00.12	Laura Muir Q (Note: On 8 July, Muir decided not to compete in the 800 metres event at the Olympics, as she wanted to focus on the 1500 metres race. Her place was reallocated to Alexandra Bell.)	2:00.24
1500 metres	Revée Walcott-Nolan Q	4:08.41	Erin Wallace	4:08.52	Katie Snowden Q	4:08.62
5000 metres	Jessica Judd Q	15:10.02	Amy-Eloise Markovc Q	15:10.54	Verity Ockenden	15:12.24
100 metres hurdles	Tiffany Porter Q	12.78s SB	Alicia Barrett Q	13.18s SB	Cindy Sember	13.20s
400 metres hurdles	Jessica Turner Q	54.83s SB	Meghan Beesley Q	55.80s PB	Jessie Knight Q	55.91s
3000 metres steeplechase	Elizabeth Bird Q	9:35.36	Aimee Pratt Q	9:39.72	Sarah Tait	10:03.58
5000 metres walk	Bethan Davies	22:47.85 SB	Abigail Jennings	25:39.68	Hannah Hopper	26:34.71 PB
Long jump	Jazmin Sawyers Q	6.75m SB	Abigail Irozuru Q	6.69m SB	Lorraine Ugen Q	6.60m
High jump	Morgan Lake Q	1.93m SB	Laura Zialor	1.86m	Emily Borthwick Q	1.86m
Triple jump	Naomi Ogbeta	14.04m	Temi Ojora	13.25m	Lia Stephenson	12.82m
Pole vault	Holly Bradshaw Q	4.90m NR	Molly Caudery	4.45m SB	Sophie Cook	4.25m SB
Shot put	Sophie McKinna Q	18.28m SB	Amelia Strickler	17.16m	Adele Nicoll	16.20m
Discus throw	Eden Francis	56.32m SB	Shadine Duquemin	54.20m	Divine Oladipo	53.21m
Hammer throw	Tara Simpson-Sullivan	67.38m	Jessica Mayho	67.08m	Rachel Hunter	65.36m SB
Javelin throw	Bekah Walton	54.03m PB	Freya Jones	49.42m	Emma Hamplett	49.07m
Heptathlon	Katie Stainton	5864 SB	Natasha Smith	5319 PB	Ashleigh Spiliopoulou	5101 PB

In addition, Dina Asher-Smith, Beth Dobbin, Imani-Lara Lansiquot, Daryll Neita, Ashleigh Nelson and Asha Philip were selected for the women's 4 x 100 metres relay. Zoey Clark, Emily Diamond, Jessie Knight, Laviai Nielsen, Ama Pipi, Jessica Turner, Hannah Williams, Jodie Williams and Nicole Yeargin were selected for the women's 4 x 400 metres relay.

=== Parasports – Men ===
Event	Gold		Silver		Bronze	
100 metres mixed class	Thomas Young	11.23s	Ola Abidogun	11.42s	Shaun Burrows	11.91s
400 metres wheelchair race	Nathan Maguire	49.78s	Moatez Jomni	51.70s	Dillion Labrooy	53.74s

Note: UK Athletics only published results for parasport track events. No results for field events were published.

=== Parasports – Women ===
Event	Gold		Silver		Bronze	
100 metres mixed class	Sophie Hahn	12.77s	Ali Smith	13.35s	Sophie Kamlish	13.47s
400 metres wheelchair race	Hannah Cockroft	56.43s	Samantha Kinghorn	56.60s	Melanie Woods	59.99s

Note: UK Athletics only published results for parasport track events. No results for field events were published.

== Other Olympic trials ==
Key: Q – qualified for the 2020 Summer Olympics.

=== Men ===
Event	Gold		Silver		Bronze	
Marathon	Chris Thompson Q	2:10:52	Ben Connor Q	2:12.06	Mohamud Aadan	2:12.20
20km walk	Callum Wilkinson Q	1:22:47	Tom Bosworth Q	1:26:24	Guy Thomas	1:30:19
10,000 metres (Note: The event was run as part of the 2021 European 10,000m Cup. The top three British finishers in the event are listed.)	Marc Scott Q	27:49.94	Mo Farah	27:50.64	Emile Cairess	27:53:19 PB

In addition, Callum Hawkins was pre-selected for the marathon event prior to the trial event. Sam Atkin was additionally selected for the 10,000 metres race.

=== Women ===
Event	Gold		Silver		Bronze	
Marathon	Stephanie Davis Q	2:27:16	Natasha Cockram	2:30.03	Rosie Edwards	2:31:56
20km walk	Heather Lewis	1:35:44	Bethan Davies	1:37:04	Erika Kelly	1:46:31
10,000 metres	Eilish McColgan Q	31:19.35	Jessica Judd Q	31:20.96 SB	Verity Ockenden	31:43.70 SB

The two remaining places for the marathon were awarded to Jess Piasecki and Stephanie Twell, neither of whom participated at the trial event. No British women were selected for the 20 km walk event at the 2020 Summer Olympics.
