= 2024 British Athletics Championships =

Athletics event

- Dates: 29–30 June
- Host city: Manchester, England
- Venue: Manchester Regional Arena
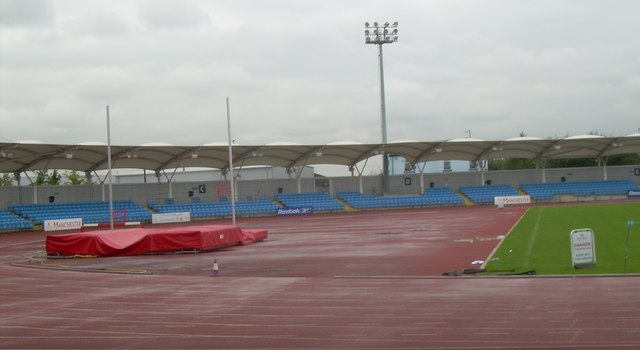
- Level: Senior
- Type: Outdoor

The 2024 British Athletics Championships (sponsored by Microplus Timing) is the national championships in outdoor track and field for athletes in the United Kingdom, which also served as a qualifying event for the 2024 Summer Olympics. The event was held on the 29 and 30 June 2024 at the Manchester Regional Arena.

A men's 10,000 metre walk was held for the first time since 2000, which was won by Callum Wilkinson in a national record.

The 10,000 metres, marathon and decathlon/heptathlon disciplines to determine the British champion were held at different venues and dates.

== Results ==
=== Men ===
Event	Gold		Silver		Bronze	
100 metres	Louie Hinchliffe	10.18	Jeremiah Azu	10.25	CJ Ujah	10.37
200 metres	Matthew Hudson-Smith	20.34	Nethaneel Mitchell-Blake	20.55	Michael Ohioze	20.68
400 metres	Charlie Dobson	44.56	Ben Jefferies	45.63	Alex Haydock-Wilson	45.92
800 metres	Ben Pattison	1:45.49	Max Burgin	1:46.01	Finley Mclear	1:46.33
1500 metres	Neil Gourley	3:37.67	George Mills	3:38.29	Adam Fogg	3:39.17
5000 metres	James West	13:43.62	Patrick Dever	13:44.58	Jack Rowe	13:46.60
110 metres hurdles	Daniel Goriola	13.55	Sam Bennett	13.56	David King	13.65
400 metres hurdles	Alastair Chalmers	48.54 CR	Alex Knibbs	49.37	Efekemo Okoro	49.44
3000 metres steeplechase	Phil Norman	8:18.65	Will Battershill	8:21.83	Zak Seddon	8:27.32
5000 metres walk	Christopher Snook	20:31.57	Luc Legon	22:53.92	Matthew Crane	24:24.29
10000 metres walk	Callum Wilkinson	38:43.91 NR	Cam Corbishley	40:12.50	Edson Wilkinson	50:33.63
Long jump	Jacob Fincham-Dukes	7.95	Alexander Farquharson	7.89	Alessandro Schenini	7.77
High jump	William Grimsey	2.15	Akin Coward	2.11	Divine Duruaku	2.11
Triple jump	Efe Uwaifo	16.22	Ben Williams	16.10	Jordan Aki-Sawyerr	15.56
Pole vault	Harry Coppell	5.40	Owen Heard	5.25	Lazarus Benjamin	5.10
Shot put	Scott Lincoln	20.81	Patrick Swan	17.83	Isaac Delaney	17.56
Discus throw	Chukwuemeka Osammor	59.98	Nick Percy	58.56	Nick Wedderman	56.45
Hammer throw	Jake Norris	76.03	Kenny Ikeji	74.81	Craig Murch	70.61
Javelin throw	Joe Dunderdale	75.06	Benjamin East	74.15	Daniel Bainbridge	70.57

The 10,000 metres was called the Night of the 10,000 PB's, held at Highgate Harriers' Parliament Hill, London Athletics track on 18 May. The best placed British athlete in each elite race was crowned as the British champion, with other medals distributed accordingly.

Event	Gold		Silver		Bronze	
10,000 metres	Patrick Dever	27:23.88	Rory Leonard	27:38.39	Charles Hicks	27:46.41

The 2024 London Marathon was the British Championship in that event. The best placed British athlete in each elite race was crowned as the British champion.

Event	Gold		Silver		Bronze	
Marathon	Emile Cairess	2:06:46	Mahamed Mahamed	2:07:05	Marc Scott	2:11:19

The 2024 British decathlon title was held on the 28 July 2024 at the Alexander Stadium.

Event	Gold		Silver		Bronze	
Decathlon	Sammy Ball	7776	Harry Kendall	7515	Jami Schlueter	7452

=== Women ===
Event	Gold		Silver		Bronze	
100 metres	Daryll Neita	11.24	Amy Hunt	11.41	Imani Lansiquot	11.43
200 metres	Dina Asher-Smith	22.18 CR	Daryll Neita	22.46	Amy Hunt	22.78
400 metres	Amber Anning	50.47 CR	Laviai Nielsen	50.92	Yemi-mary John	51.23
800 metres	Phoebe Gill	1:58.66	Jemma Reekie	1:59.28	Erin Wallace	2:00.88
1500 metres	Georgia Bell	4:10.69	Laura Muir	4:11.59	Revée Walcott-Nolan	4:11.70
5000 metres	Hannah Nuttall	15:13.70	Verity Ockenden	15:13.78	Isobel Fry	15:14.92
100 metres hurdles	Cindy Sember	12.85	Alicia Barrett	13.40	Jessica Hunter	13.41
400 metres hurdles	Lina Nielsen	54.81	Jessie Knight	55.36	Jessica Tappin	56.86
3000 metres steeplechase	Lizzie Bird	9:29.67 CR	Elise Thorner	9:33.53	Stevie Lawrence	9:45.46
5000 metres walk	Gracie Griffiths	22:53.93	Abigail Jennings	24:18.02	Hannah Hopper	24:52.19
Long jump	Jade O'Dowda	6.55	Alice Hopkins	6.38	Molly Palmer	6.11
High jump	Morgan Lake	1.85	Lucy Walliker	1.79	Halle Ferguson	1.79
Triple jump	Naomi Metzger	13.76	Temi Ojora	13.26	Lily Hulland	13.25
Pole vault	Molly Caudery	4.73	Jade Spencer-Smith	4.31	Sophie Ashurst	4.21
Shot put	Amelia Campbell	17.59	Serena Vincent	17.32	Divine Oladipo	17.24
Discus throw	Divine Oladipo	54.78	Zara Obamakinwa	53.23	Jade Lally	52.75
Hammer throw	Anna Purchase	68.79	Charlotte Payne	67.33	Katie Head	64.81
Javelin throw	Bekah Walton	54.11	Freya Jones	51.97	Sarah-Anne de Kremer	47.40

The 10,000 metres (Night of the 10,000 PB's) was held at Highgate Harriers' Parliament Hill, London Athletics track on 18 May. The best placed British athlete in each elite race was crowned as the British champion.

Event	Gold		Silver		Bronze	
10,000 metres	Megan Keith	31:03.02	Jessica Warner-Judd	31:36.37	Abbie Donnelly	31:45.37

The 2024 London Marathon was the British Championship in the marathon event. The leading British athletes were as follows:

Event	Gold		Silver		Bronze	
Marathon	Mhairi Maclennan	2:29:15	Becky Briggs	2:35:25	Rachel Hodgkinson	2:36:49

The 2024 British heptathlon title was held on the 28 July 2024 at the Alexander Stadium.

Event	Gold		Silver		Bronze	
Heptathlon	Eden Robinson	5597	Lauren Evans	5402	Anna McCauley	5363
