= Etihad Stadium =

Football stadium in Manchester, England

Coordinates: 53°28′59″N 2°12′01″W

City of Manchester Stadium Etihad Stadium
- "The Etihad"

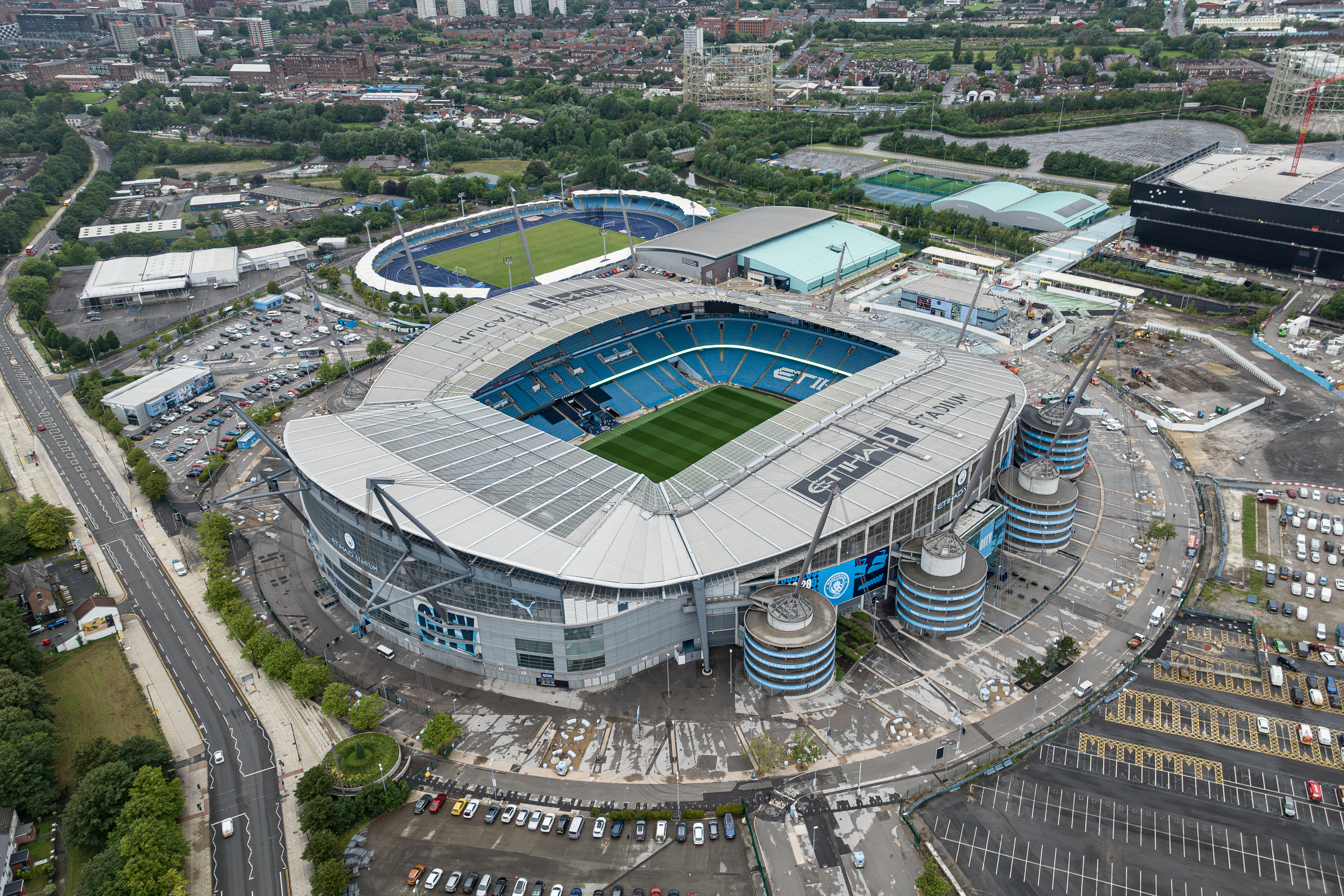
- City of Manchester Stadium (2023); UEFA
- Interactive map of City of Manchester Stadium; Etihad Stadium
- Full name: City of Manchester Stadium
- Address: Ashton New Road
- Location: Etihad Campus; Manchester, England; M11 3FF
- Owner: Manchester City Council
- Operator: Manchester City
- Capacity: 61,038 – Domestic football 60,000 – Music concerts 41,000 (2002 Commonwealth Games)
- Executive suites: 70
- Surface: Desso GrassMaster
- Record attendance: 60,817 (Manchester City vs Ipswich Town , 17 October 2026)
- Field size: 105 by 68 metres (114.8 yd × 74.4 yd)
- Public transit: Etihad Campus; Velopark

Construction
- Groundbreaking: December 12, 1999; 26 years ago
- Opened: 25 July 2002 (as athletics stadium); 10 August 2003 (as football stadium)
- Renovated: 2002–2003 (conversion)
- Expanded: 2014–2015 (47,400 to 55,100 seats); 2023–2026 (55,100 to 61,470 seats)
- Cost: £112 million (athletics stadium) £22 million (football conversion) £20 million (football fit-out)
- Architects: Arup (stadium design); KSS Design Group (interior fitout); Populous (stadium expansion)
- Structural engineer: Arup
- General contractors: Laing Construction Ltd. (initial construction), Laing O'Rourke (stadium conversion & later expansion)
- Main contractor: Watson Steel Ltd (initial steelwork construction)

Tenants
- Manchester City (2003–present): Major sporting events hosted; 2002 Commonwealth Games; UEFA Women's Euro 2005; 2008 UEFA Cup final; 2015 Rugby Union World Cup; UEFA Euro 2028; Also see: Major concert events hosted

Website
- Etihad Stadium

The Etihad Stadium (formerly known as City of Manchester Stadium before being renamed for sponsorship reasons) is the home of Premier League club Manchester City, with a domestic football capacity of 61,038, making it the 6th-largest football stadium in England and 8th-largest stadium in the United Kingdom.

Built to host the 2002 Commonwealth Games, the stadium has since staged the 2008 UEFA Cup final, England football internationals, rugby league matches, a boxing world title fight, the England rugby union team's final group match of the 2015 Rugby World Cup and summer music concerts during the football off-season.

The stadium, originally proposed as an athletics arena in Manchester's bid for the 2000 Summer Olympics, was converted after the 2002 Commonwealth Games from a 38,000 capacity arena to a 48,000 seat football stadium at a cost to the city council of £22 million and to Manchester City of £20 million. Manchester City agreed to lease the stadium from Manchester City Council and moved there from Maine Road in the summer of 2003.

The stadium was built by Laing Construction at a cost of £112 million and was designed and engineered by Arup, whose design incorporated a cable-stayed roof structure supported entirely by twelve exterior masts and cables. The stadium design has received much praise and many accolades, including an award from the Royal Institute of British Architects in 2004 for its innovative inclusive building design and a special award in 2003 from the Institution of Structural Engineers for its unique structural design.

In August 2015, a 7,000-seat third tier on the South Stand was completed, in time for the start of the 2015–16 football season. A £300 million redevelopment programme of the existing North Stand, entailing the construction of a new hotel with 400 rooms, covered fan park for 3,000 people and increased net capacity to approximately 61,000, commenced in July 2023 and has since been completed. At the announcement of Pep Guardiola's leaving of the club, the North Stand was renamed the Pep Guardiola Stand in his honour.

== History ==
=== Background ===
Plans to build a new stadium in Manchester were formulated before 1989 as part of the city's bid to host the 1996 Summer Olympics. Manchester City Council submitted a bid that included a design for an 80,000-capacity stadium on a greenfield site west of Manchester city centre. The bid failed and Atlanta hosted the Games. Four years later, the city council bid to host the 2000 Summer Olympics, but this time focusing on a brownfield site 1.6 kilometres (0.99 mi) east of the city centre on derelict land that was the site of Bradford Colliery, known colloquially as Eastlands. The council's shift in focus was driven by emerging government legislation on urban renewal, promising vital support funding for such projects; the government became involved in funding the purchase and clearance of the Eastlands site in 1992.

For the February 1993 bid, the city council submitted another 80,000-capacity stadium design produced by design consultants Arup, the firm that helped select the Eastlands site. On 23 September 1993, the games were awarded to Sydney, but the following year Manchester submitted the same scheme design to the Millennium Commission as a "Millennium Stadium", only to have this proposal rejected. Undeterred, Manchester City Council subsequently bid to host the 2002 Commonwealth Games, once again proposing the same site along with downsized stadium plans derived from the 2000 Olympics bid, and this time were successful. In 1996, this same planned stadium competed with Wembley to gain funding to become the new national stadium, but the money was used to redevelop Wembley.

After successful athletics events at the Commonwealth Games, conversion into a football venue was criticised by athletics figures such as Jonathan Edwards and Sebastian Coe as, at the time, the United Kingdom still lacked plans for a large athletics venue due to the capability of installing an athletics track having been dropped from the designs for a rebuilt Wembley Stadium. Had either of the two larger stadium proposals developed by Arup been agreed for funding, then Manchester would have had a venue capable of being adapted to hosting large-scale athletics events through the use of movable seating.

Sport England wished to avoid creating a white elephant, so they insisted that the City Council agree to undertake and fund extensive work to convert the venue from a track-and-field arena to a football stadium, thereby ensuring its long-term financial viability. Sport England hoped either Manchester City Council or Manchester City would provide the extra £50 million required to convert the stadium to a 65,000-seater athletics and footballing venue with movable seating. However, Manchester City Council did not have the money to facilitate movable seating and Manchester City were lukewarm about the idea. Stadium architects Arup believed history demonstrated that maintaining a rarely used athletics track often does not work with football – and cited examples such as the Stadio delle Alpi and the Olympic Stadium with both Juventus and Bayern Munich moving to new stadiums less than 40 years after inheriting them.

=== 2002 Commonwealth Games ===
Model of 80,000-seat stadium used in the Bids for the 2000 Summer Olympics. The proposed stadium was a larger design, with more access ramps and masts.

The stadium's foundation stone was laid by then-Prime Minister Tony Blair in December 1999, and construction began in January 2000. The stadium was designed by Arup and constructed by Laing Construction at a cost of approximately £112 million, £77 million of which was provided by Sport England, with the remainder funded by Manchester City Council. For the Commonwealth Games, the stadium featured a single lower tier of seating running around three sides of the athletics track, and second tiers to the two sides, with an open-air temporary stand at the northern end; initially providing a seating capacity for the Games of 38,000, subsequently extended to 41,000 through the installation of additional temporary trackside seating along the east and south stands.

The first public event at the stadium was the opening ceremony of the 2002 Commonwealth Games on 25 July 2002. Among the dignitaries present was Queen Elizabeth II who made a speech, delivered to her in an electronic baton, and 'declared the Commonwealth Games open'. During the following ten days of competition, the stadium hosted the track and field events and all the rugby sevens matches. Sixteen new Commonwealth Games track and field (Note: The term "track and field" normally excludes "road race" athletics events (e.g. men's 50 km race walk, women's marathon, etc.) from the other "athletics" sport events. 'Road race' events may terminate in an athletics stadium but are not usually considered as having been staged there. Furthermore, race walking events were removed from the Commonwealth Games program after the 2010 Games. Although paraplegic athletics events are normally now included under the term 'track and field', two EAD records have been excluded from the tally of 16 stated in the article as they are often omitted from externally sourced lists of past Games records and thus become a frequent cause of confusion when included in such totals.) records (six men's and ten women's) were set in the stadium. Prior to the 2012 Summer Olympics held in London, the 2002 Games was the largest multi-sport event ever to be staged in the United Kingdom, eclipsing the earlier London 1948 Summer Olympics in numbers of teams and competing athletes (3,679), and it was the world's first multi-sport tournament to include a limited number of full medal events for elite athletes with a disability (EAD). In terms of number of participating nations, it is still the largest Commonwealth Games in history, featuring 72 nations competing in 281 events across seventeen (fourteen individual and three team) sports.

=== Stadium conversion ===
City of Manchester Stadium evolution

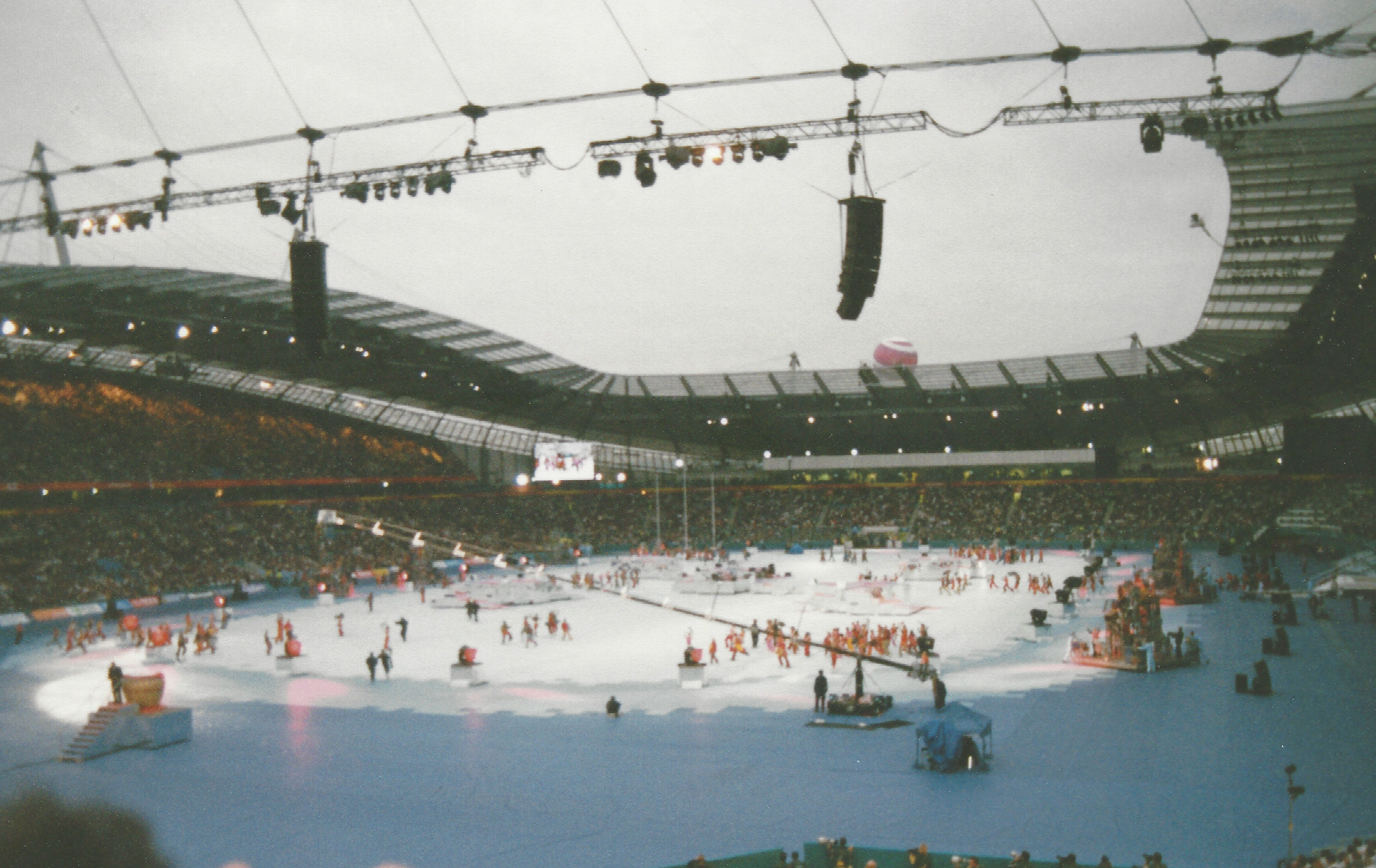
2002
The 2002 Commonwealth Games was set out in a horseshoe configuration with two tiers of seats.

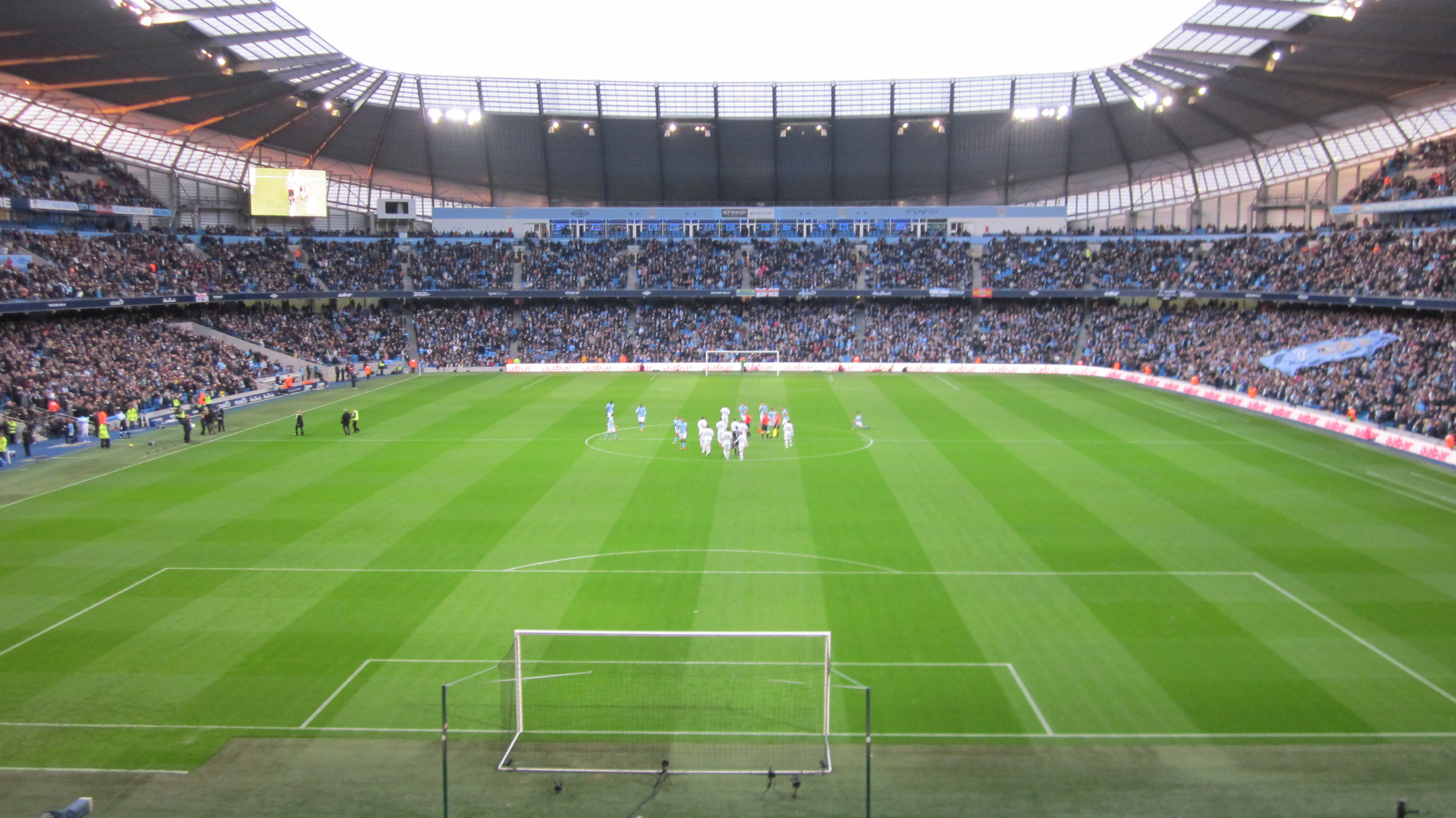
2003–2015
During conversion, the athletics track was excavated and the stadium pitch level lowered to create a lower tier.

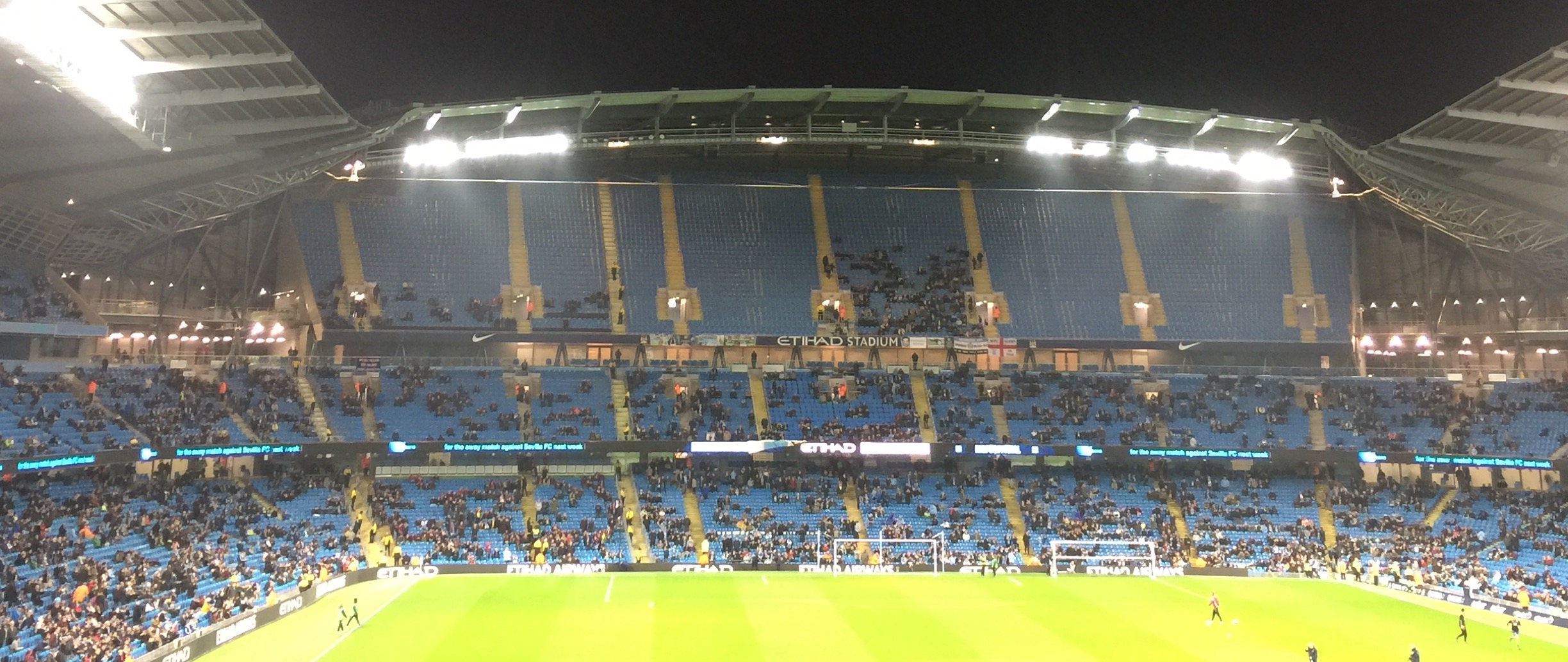
2015–present
A third tier was added to the south stand in 2015.

Sections of the track were removed and relaid at other athletics venues, and the internal ground level was lowered to make way for an additional tier of seating, on terracing already constructed then buried for the original configuration. The three temporary stands with a total capacity of 16,000 were dismantled, and replaced with a permanent structure of similar design to the existing one at the southern end. This work took nearly a year to complete and added 23,000 permanent seats, increasing the capacity of the converted stadium by 7,000 to approximately 48,000. Manchester City moved to the ground in time for the start of the 2003–04 season. The total cost of this conversion was in excess of £40 million, with the track, pitch and seating conversion being funded by the city council at a cost of £22 million; and the installation of bars, restaurants and corporate entertainment areas throughout the stadium being funded by the football club at a cost of £20 million. The Games had made a small operating surplus, and Sport England agreed that this could be reinvested in converting the athletics warm-up track adjacent to the main stadium into the 6,000 seat Manchester Regional Arena at a cost of £3.5 million.

=== Stadium expansion ===
The stadium is owned by Manchester City Council and leased by the football club on a 'fully repairing' basis. All operating, maintenance and future capital costs are borne by the club, who consequently receive all revenues from stadium users. The 2008 takeover prompted suggestions that the club—one of the wealthiest in the world—could buy the stadium outright. Manchester City signed an agreement with Manchester City Council in March 2010 to allow a £1 billion redevelopment led by architect Rafael Viñoly.

During the 2010 closed season, the football pitch and hospitality areas were renovated, with a £1 million investment being made in the playing surface so that it is better able to tolerate concerts and other events without damage. In October 2010, Manchester City renegotiated the stadium lease, obtaining the naming rights to the stadium in return for agreeing to now pay the City Council an annual fixed sum of £3 million where previously it had only paid half of the ticket sales revenue from match attendances exceeding 35,000. This new agreement occurred as part of a standard five-year review of the original lease and it amounts to an approximate £1 million annual increase in council revenues from the stadium. During 2011–14, the club sold all 36,000 of its allocated season tickets each season and experienced an average match attendance that is very close to its maximum seating capacity (see table in subsequent section). Consequently, during the 2014–15 season, an expansion of the stadium was undertaken. The South Stand was extended with the addition of a third tier which, in conjunction with an additional three rows of pitch side seating, increased stadium capacity to approximately 55,000. Construction commenced on the South Stand in April 2014 and was completed by the start of the 2015–16 season.

A final phase of expansion, which received planning approval at the same time as the others, added a matching third tier of seats to the North Stand. In November 2018, the club consulted with season ticket holders on possible alternative configurations for this expansion, including proposals for a still larger two-tier North Stand without executive boxes or corporate hospitality lounges, and possibly with areas convertible to safe standing. The full length of the second tiers in the East and West stands would then be reconfigured as premium seating associated with new hospitality bar areas. This final phase brought the stadium's total seating capacity up to approximately 62,000, making the Etihad Stadium the nation's fourth largest capacity club ground, after Old Trafford, the London Stadium and the Tottenham Hotspur Stadium.

A £300 million redevelopment programme of the existing North Stand was approved in April 2023. Entailing the construction of a new hotel, covered fan park for 6,000 people and increased net capacity to 61,474 (allowing for seats blocked off for fan separation). Construction commenced in 2023. The new stand was opened in time for City's last match of the 2025–26 season against Aston Villa. The second tier at the north end of the stadium was extended with a further 7,900 seats; while a 'Skybar', linked to the hotel and with premium seating for 450, surmounted the whole.

On 22 May 2026, the club announced that the new north stand would be named in honour of their most successful manager, Pep Guardiola, whose departure, after ten years at the club, coincided with its opening.

== Architecture ==
It's the roller-coaster roof, visible from miles around, that is the big giveaway. It has a similar lightweight canopy that swoops up and down over the stands in one almost continuous wave. Held up by nothing more than thread-like cables, this is structural gymnastics of the most exhilarating kind, vastly superior to the clunky steel trusses that conventionally support stadium roofs.

— Martin Spring, Building magazine (2002)

The stadium's roof, with its masts and cable stays, gives the stadium a striking appearance. Apart from the innovative roof design, which made economical use of materials, the stadium is notable for its attention to such details as crowd comfort, ease of access (via those eight great spirals that flank the stadium), and provision for a diverse audience

— Sir John Armitt, Civil Engineer (2016)

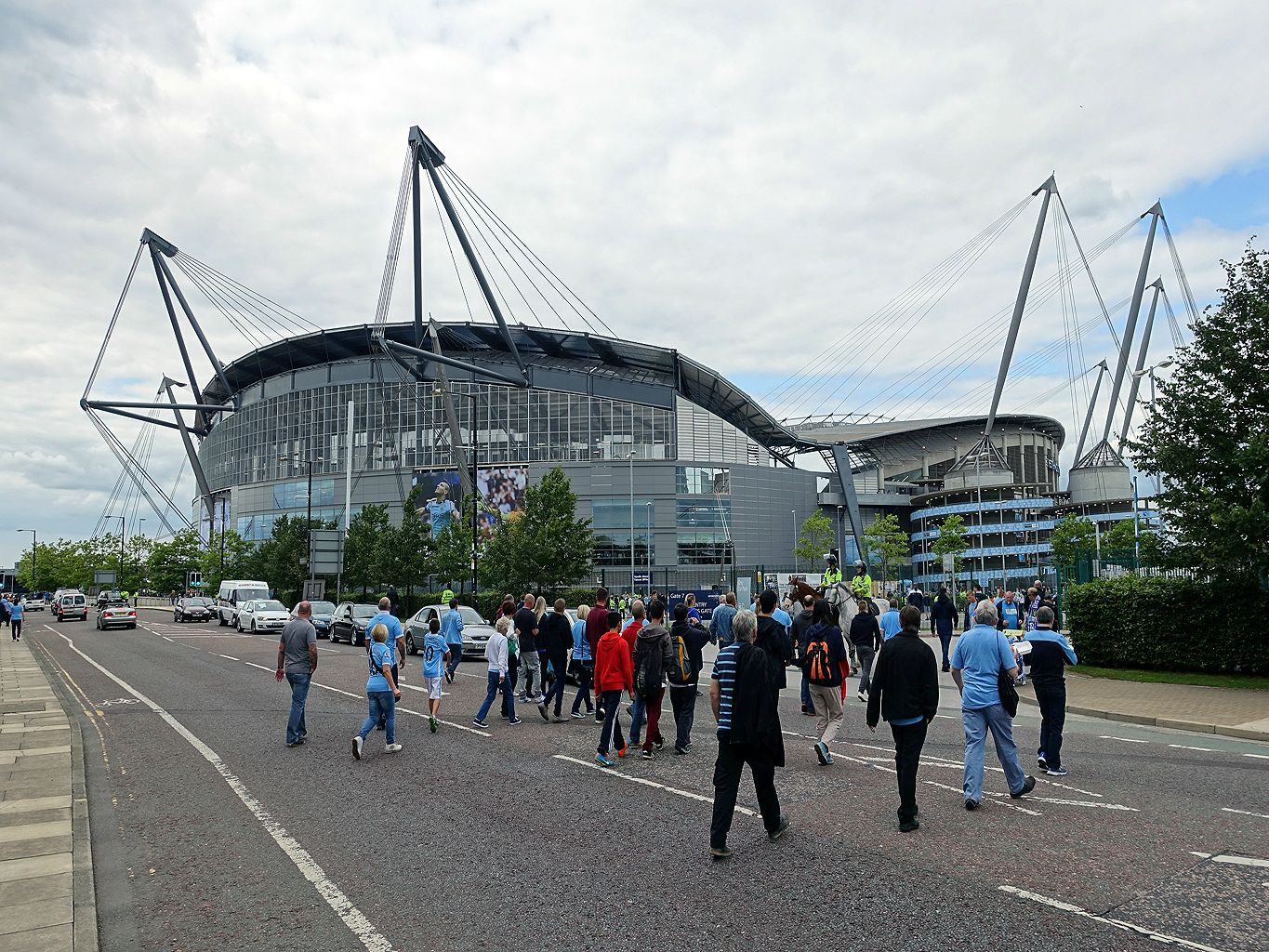
Rear view of the South Stand in 2015. Two sets of masts and steel cabling separately suspend the new South Stand roof and the catenary cable, supporting roofs on the other three sides.

When planning the development, Manchester City Council required a sustainable landmark structure that would be an icon for the regeneration of the once heavily industrialised site surrounding Bradford Colliery, as well as providing spectators with good sightlines in an "atmospheric" arena. Arup designed the stadium to be "an intimate, even intimidating, gladiatorial arena embodying the atmosphere of a football club" with the pitch six metres below ground level, a feature of Roman gladiatorial arenas and amphitheatres. The attention to detail, often absent in stadium design, has been remarked upon, including the cigar-shaped roof supports with blue lighting beacons, sculpted rainwater gutters, poly-carbonate perimeter roof edging and openable louvres to aid pitch grass growth with similarities also made to high-tech architecture.

=== Roof design ===
The toroidal-shaped stadium roof is held together by a tensioned system, which has been described as "ground-breaking" by New Steel Construction magazine. The stadium's architectural focal point is the sweeping roof and support masts which are separate from the concrete bowl. A catenary cable is situated around the inner perimeter of the roof structure which is tied to the masts via forestay cables. Backstay cables and corner ties from the masts are connected to the ground to support the structure. With the expansion of the South Stand in 2015 to accommodate a third tier of seating, the original south end roof was dismantled; but with the southern masts and corner ties remaining, so as to continue to tie the catenary cable which now runs below the new roof. The new higher South Stand roof is a separate structure, with its own set of braced masts and cables; and it is expected that a counterpart arrangement will be adopted for the proposed North Stand expansion.

Cables are attached to the 12 masts circling the stadium with rafters and purlins for additional rigid support. The cigar-shaped masts double as visual features, with the highest at 70 metres (230 ft). Access to the upper tiers of seats is provided by eight circular ramps with conical roofs resembling turrets above which eight of the twelve masts rise up providing the support structure for the roof.

The roof of the south, east and west stands built for the athletics stadium configuration was supported by the cable net system. The temporary open stand at the north end was built around the masts and tie down cables that would ultimately support the roof of the North Stand. After the games, the track and field were excavated. The temporary bleachers at the north end were removed and the North Stand and lower tier of seats constructed on the prepared excavation. The North Stand roof was completed by adding rafters, purlins and cladding.

=== Facilities and pitch ===
The stadium has facilities for players and match officials in a basement area below the west stand, which also contains a kitchen providing meals for up to 6,000 people on match days, press rooms, ground staff storage, and a prison cell. The stadium also has conference facilities and is licensed for marriage ceremonies. Fitting out of the hospitality suites, kitchens, offices, and concourse concessions was accomplished by KSS Architects, and included the installation of the communications cabling and automatic access control system.

The stadium's interior comprises a continuous oval bowl, with three tiers of seating at the sides, and two tiers at each end. Entry by patrons is gained by contactless smart card rather than traditional staffed turnstiles. The system can admit up to 1,200 people per minute through all entrances. A service tunnel under the stadium provides access for emergency vehicles and the visiting team's coach to enter the stadium directly. Once inside the stadium patrons have access to six themed restaurants, two of which have views of the pitch, and there are 70 executive boxes above the second tier of seating in the north, west and east stands. The stadium is equipped with stand-by generators should there be an electrical mains failure. These are capable of keeping the stadium electrics running as well as the floodlights at 800 lux, the minimum level stipulated by FIFA to continue to broadcast live football.

To create the optimum grass playing surface in the stadium bowl, the roof was designed to maximise sunlight by using a ten-metre band of translucent polycarbonate at its periphery. Additionally, each of the corners of the stadium without seating have perforated walls with moveable louvres that can be adjusted to provide ventilation of the grass and general airflow through the stadium. Drainage and under-pitch heating were installed to provide optimum growing conditions for the grass. The pitch has a UEFA standard dimension of 105 by 68 metres (115 by 74 yd). and is covered with natural grass reinforced by artificial fibres made by Desso. The field of play is lit by 218 2000-watt floodlights, consuming a total of 436,000 watts. The grass playing surface is recognised as being one of the best in English football, and has been nominated five times in the last nine seasons for best Premier League pitch, an accolade it won in 2010–11 among other awards.

== Names ==
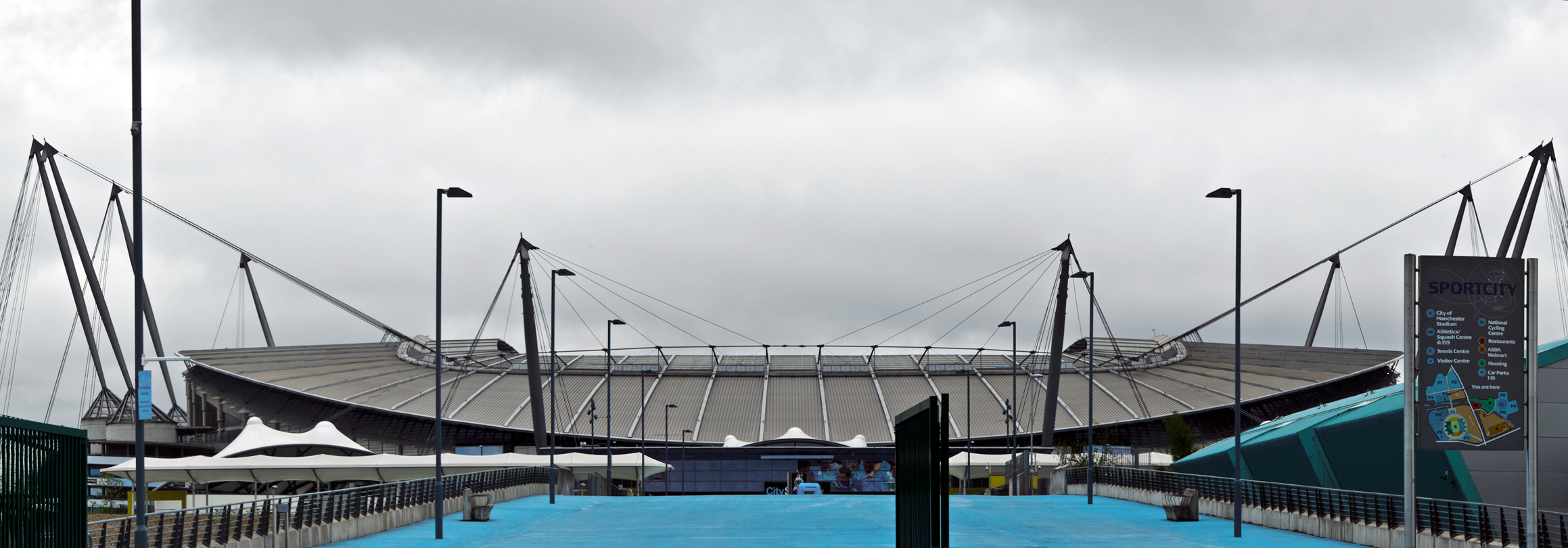
Panorama of the stadium's north end as viewed from southern approach along Joe Mercer Way

The stadium was named the City of Manchester Stadium by Manchester City Council before construction began in December 1999, but has a number of commonly used alternatives. City of Manchester Stadium is abbreviated to CoMS when written and spoken. Eastlands refers to the site and the stadium before they were named SportCity and CoMS respectively, and remains in common usage for both the stadium and the whole complex, as does SportCity but with less frequency. The stadium was also officially referred to as Manchester City Stadium for the 2015 Rugby World Cup. The club, under its new ownership, renegotiated its 250-year lease with the city council in October 2010, gaining the naming rights in return for a substantial increase in rent. The stadium was renamed the Etihad Stadium by the club in July 2011 as part of a ten-year agreement with the team kit sponsors Etihad Airways. The agreement encompasses sponsorship of the stadium's name, extends the team kit sponsorship for ten years, and relocated the club's youth academy and training facilities to the City Football Academy onto the Etihad Campus development across the road from the stadium.

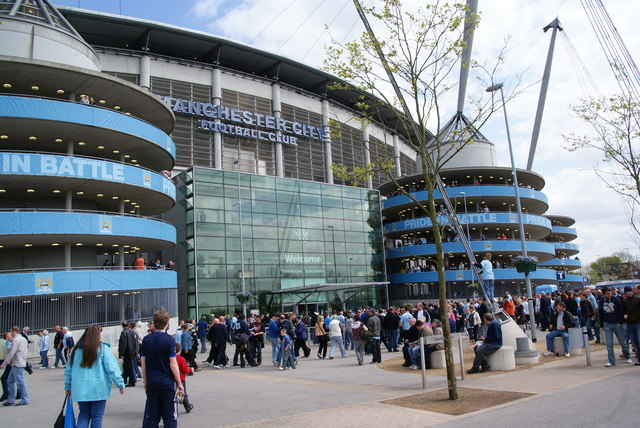
Main entrance to Colin Bell Stand on the west side of the stadium

Despite being a continuous oval bowl, each side of the stadium is named in the manner of a traditional football ground. All sides were initially named by compass direction (North Stand and South Stand for the ends, East Stand and West Stand for the sides). In February 2004, after a vote by fans, the West Stand was renamed the Colin Bell Stand in honour of the former player. The vote was almost cancelled (and the stand instead named after Joe Mercer) due to suspicions it had been hijacked by rival fans who wished to dub the renamed stand The Bell End. However, core supporters of the club made it clear they still wished the stand named after their hero. The East Stand is unofficially known by fans as the Kippax as a tribute to the very vocal east stand at the club's Maine Road ground.

The North Stand is the only part of the stadium built after the Commonwealth Games, during the stadium's conversion. The temporary unroofed north stand it replaced had been dubbed the New Gene Kelly Stand by supporters, a reference to the unroofed corner between the Kippax and the North Stand at the club's former Maine Road home, because, being exposed to the elements, they frequently found themselves "singing in the Rain". Commencing season 2010–11, seating in the North Stand has been restricted to only supporters accompanied by children, resulting in this end of the ground now being commonly referred to as the Family Stand. Although the North Stand has never been officially renamed, and is still frequently referenced that way, most external ticketing offices and stadium guides, in addition to the club itself, now preferentially label and refer to this section of the ground as the Family Stand when discussing seating and ticket sales. Supporters initially dubbed the South Stand the Scoreboard End (the former name of the North Stand at Maine Road), and it houses the majority of City's more vocal fans. Supporters of visiting teams are also normally allocated seats in this stand, as it has ready access from the visitor supporter coach park. From 2003 to 2006, the South Stand was renamed the Key 103 Stand for sponsorship reasons, though this was largely ignored by regular patrons. The November 2018 consultation exercise on further expansion options envisages the North Stand then becoming the Home End, with no corporate hospitality areas, a greatly extended second tier, "affordable" ticket prices and possible areas capable of conversion to safe standing. The singing area would then be in the North Stand, and the Family Stand would be relocated elsewhere in the Stadium. In 2026, it was announced the expanded North Stand would be renamed after Pep Guardiola, following his departure after ten years as manager.

== SportCity ==
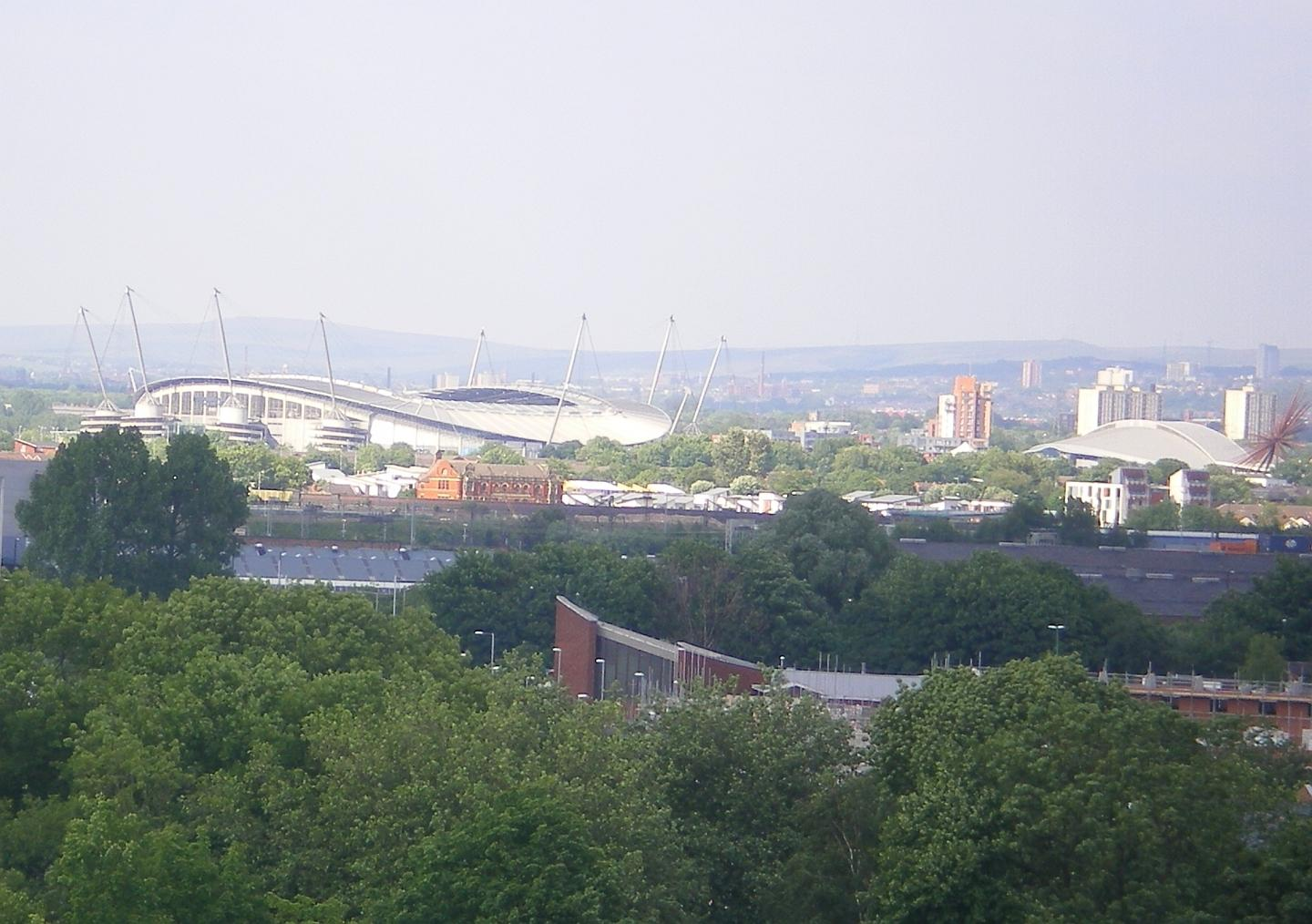
SportCity with City of Manchester Stadium (left) and Manchester Velodrome (right)

The stadium is the centrepiece of SportCity, which includes several other nationally important sporting venues. Adjacent to the stadium is the Manchester Regional Arena, which served as a warm-up track during the Commonwealth Games and is now a 6,178-capacity venue that hosts national athletics trials, but has previously also hosted the home games of both the Manchester City women's team and the club's under-21 reserve team. The Regional Arena has regularly hosted the AAA Championships and Paralympic World Cup, and is currently the home ground of amateur rugby league side Manchester Rangers.

The National Squash Centre and the National Cycling Centre, which includes both the Manchester Velodrome and the National Indoor BMX Arena, are all a short distance from the stadium. The Squash Centre, which has hosted the British National Squash Championships since 2003 was added to the SportCity complex for the Commonwealth Games along with CoMS. The Velodrome, another showpiece venue used to stage all the track cycling events for the Games, was already in place and had been home to British Cycling, the governing body for cycling in Britain, since it was built in 1994, as part of Manchester's unsuccessful 2000 Olympics bid. Prior to the completion of the Lee Valley VeloPark for the 2012 Summer Olympics, the Velodrome had been the only indoor Olympic-standard track in the United Kingdom. The collocated BMX Arena houses the United Kingdom's only permanent indoor BMX track and provides seating for up 2,000 spectators. It was added to the National Cycling Centre at SportCity in 2011.

Other major sporting and sport-related venues located in SportCity in the immediate vicinity of the Etihad Stadium, all legacies of the 2002 Commonwealth Games are the English Institute of Sport, west of the stadium, adjacent to the southwest corner of the Regional Arena; the Manchester Regional Tennis Centre, adjacent to the north end of the stadium; and the Manchester Tennis & Football Centre, also adjacent to the stadium, which is operated and administered by the Manchester Sport and Leisure Trust.

=== Public sculpture ===
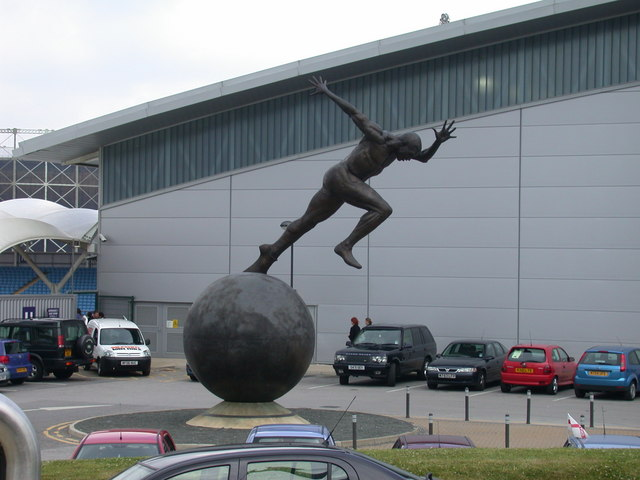
Colin Spofforth's giant bronze sculpture, The Runner, at SportCity

Between 11 March (Commonwealth Day) and 10 August 2002, as part of the preparations for the upcoming Commonwealth Games and to celebrate Her Majesty the Queen's Golden Jubilee, a national Spirit of Friendship Festival was organised. On 9 July, a few weeks before the Games began, a sculpture outside the new national headquarters of the English Institute of Sport at SportCity was unveiled by the middle-distance runner Steve Cram. This sculpture, commissioned in late 2001, was created in a little over eight weeks by Altrincham-based artist Colin Spofforth, who had submitted to Manchester City Council his idea for a heroic-sized sculpture of a sprinter as a means of celebrating the beauty, power and determination of the competing athletes. Reaching thirty feet high, weighing seven tonnes, and titled The Runner, this unique larger-than-life bronze statue of a male sprinter surmounting a bronze globe was, at the time, the United Kingdom's largest sporting sculpture. It depicts the very moment the runner leaves the blocks once the starter's gun has fired.

From 2005 to 2009, a Thomas Heatherwick sculpture, B of the Bang, was situated to the southeast of the stadium at the junction of Ashton New Road and Alan Turing Way. Built after the Commonwealth Games to commemorate them, it was the tallest sculpture in the United Kingdom. However, numerous structural problems led to the 184 ft. sculpture being dismantled in 2009 for safety reasons. In 2014, money recovered by the Manchester City Council as a result of lengthy legal battles consequent to this debacle was used to fund a new £341,000 public sculpture a few hundred yards further south.

Across 2021 and 2022, Manchester City unveiled outside the stadium three statues designed by Andy Scott of players crucial to the team's first Premier League title in 2011–12. First came a pair of defender Vincent Kompany and striker David Silva, and one year later one of striker Sergio Agüero recreating his celebration after scoring the "93:20" goal. In 2023, the club unveiled a statue of trio Colin Bell, Francis Lee and Mike Summerbee, designed by David Williams-Ellis.

== Stadium firsts ==
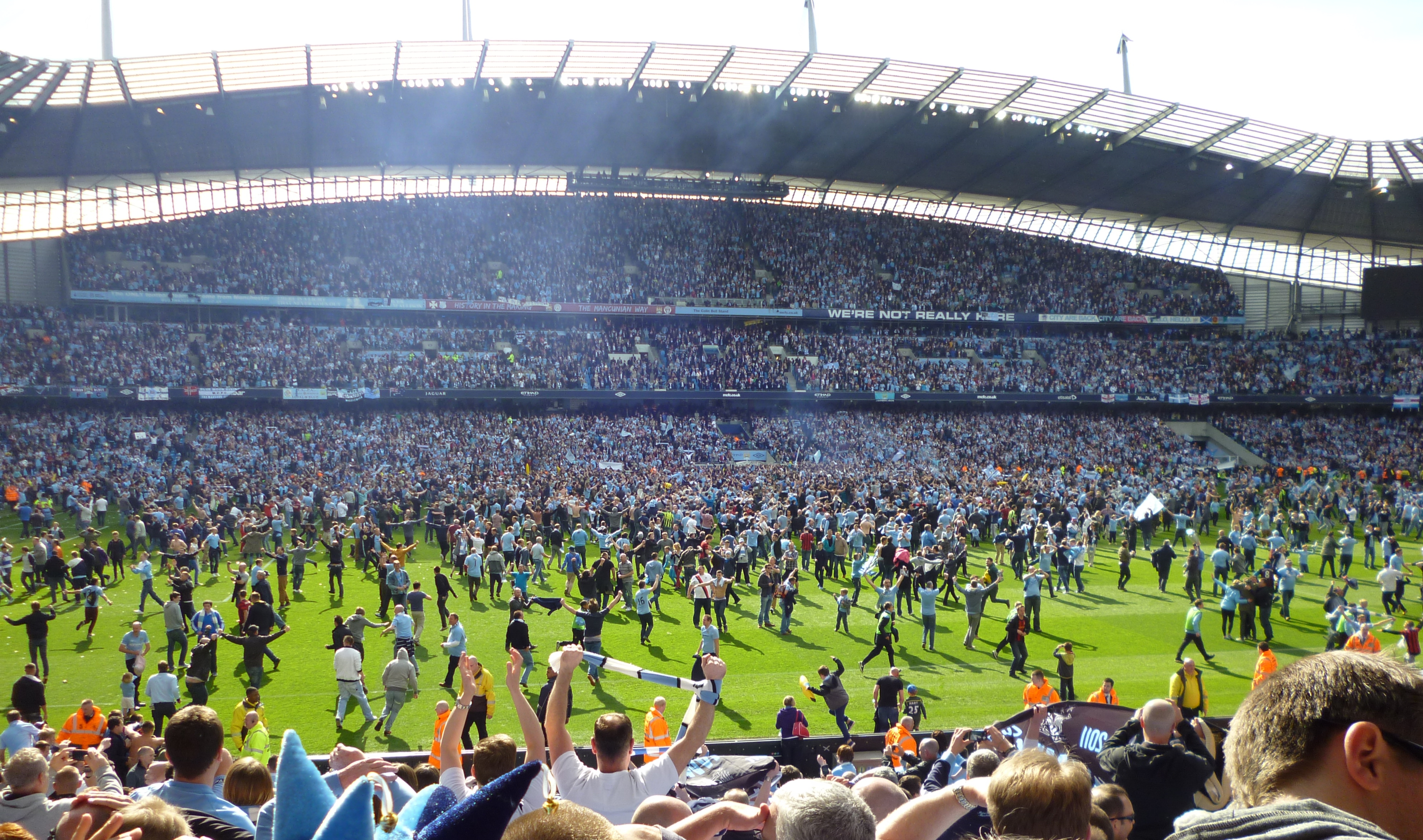
Pitch invasion after Manchester City's 3–2 Premier League title victory over Queens Park Rangers in 2012

The first public football match at the stadium was a friendly between Manchester City and Barcelona on 10 August 2003. Manchester City won the game 2–1, with Nicolas Anelka scoring the first ever goal in the stadium.

The first competitive match followed four days later, a UEFA Cup match between Manchester City and Welsh Premier League side Total Network Solutions, which City won 5–0 with Trevor Sinclair scoring the first competitive goal in the stadium. Having started the Premier League season with an away match, Manchester City's first home league fixture in the new stadium was on 23 August, a game drawn 1–1 with Portsmouth, with Pompey's Yakubu scoring the first league goal in the stadium, and David Sommeil being the first City player to score here in the league.

The 2011–12 season saw the Etihad Stadium play host to the setting of a number of new club and Premier League footballing records, such as the club becoming the first ever team to win 11 of its opening 12 games in a Premier League season, and going on to remain unbeaten at the Etihad Stadium in all 19 of the Premier League games played there. The club's record of 55 home points out of a possible 57 at the stadium is a joint best Premier League record, and the club's record of twenty consecutive home wins at the stadium (going back to the end of the previous season) also set a new Premier League record in March 2012.

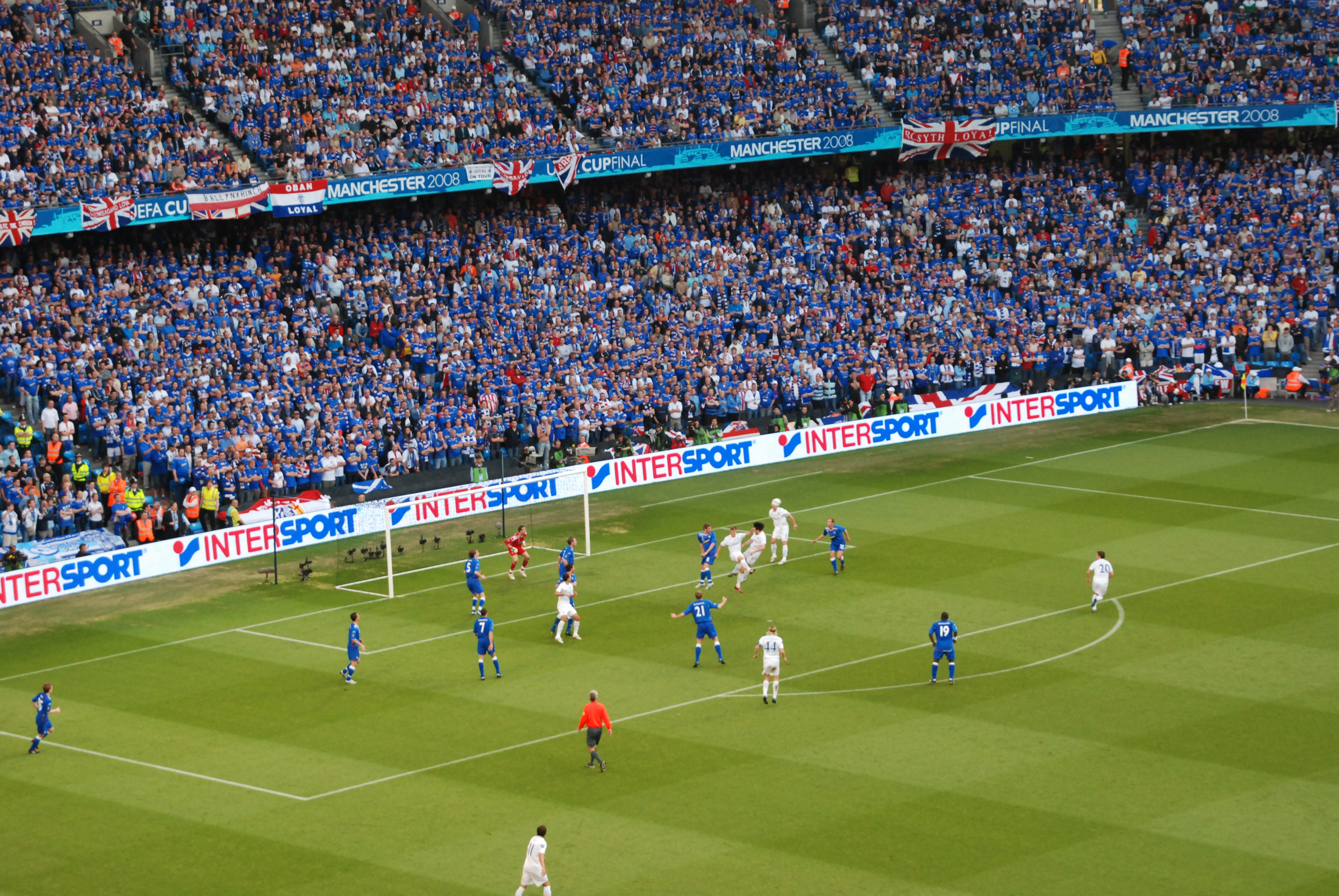
Action from the 2008 UEFA Cup final

The record football attendance at the stadium not involving its host team Manchester City is 43,878, which was set at the 2008 UEFA Cup final game between Zenit Saint Petersburg and Rangers on 14 May 2008. As is customary for such games, the then 47,715 maximum physical capacity of the stadium had been reduced by UEFA to around 44,000 for this final. However, neither limit would have been able to accommodate the vast number of supporters of the Scottish club, estimated to be in excess of 130,000, that travelled down from Glasgow to Manchester on the day of the game, despite the club's official ticket allocation being just 13,000 and police requests for fans without tickets to stay home. This order of magnitude mismatch between the numbers of travelling fans and those holding tickets ultimately led to a serious public disorder incident in the centre of the city now inextricably associated with this final, despite the fact that the 44,000 or so crowd who watched the game inside the stadium were perfectly well-behaved.

== Reception ==
Average Premier League attendances
Season	Stadium capacity	Average attendance	% of capacity	Ranking within the Premier League
2003–04	47,726	46,834	98.1%	3rd highest
2004–05	47,726	45,192	94.7%	3rd highest
2005–06	47,726	42,856	89.8%	4th highest
2006–07	47,726	39,997	83.8%	6th highest
2007–08	47,715	42,126	88.3%	6th highest
2008–09	47,405	42,900	90.5%	5th highest
2009–10	47,405	45,513	95.4%	3rd highest
2010–11	47,405	45,905	96.8%	4th highest
2011–12	47,405	47,045	99.2%	4th highest
2012–13	47,405	46,974	99.1%	4th highest
2013–14	47,405	47,080	99.3%	4th highest
2014–15	46,708 (Note: Reduced capacity due to South Stand expansion. Construction work phasing meant the maximum capacity varied over the course of the season.)	45,365	97.1%	4th highest
2015–16	55,097 (Note: Increased capacity due to completion of third tier on South Stand.)	54,041	98.1%	3rd highest
2016–17	55,097	54,019	98.0%	4th highest
2017–18	55,017 (Note: Capacity reduced by 80 seats since 2017/18 season)	53,812	97.8%	5th highest
2018–19	55,017	54,130	98.4%	5th highest
2019–20	55,017	54,391 (Note: As of 20 January 2020)	98.9%	5th highest

The 2002 Commonwealth Games were deemed a success and the stadium gained critical acclaim for its atmosphere and architectural design. It has won a number of design awards, including the 2004 Royal Institute of British Architects Inclusive Design Award for inclusive building design, the 2003 Institution of Structural Engineers Structural Special Award, and in 2002 a BCI Major Project high commendation was awarded by the British Construction Industry. In July 2014, the stadium was declared one of the United Kingdom's five most iconic structures by the Construction Industry Training Board.

In 2003, initial reception by Manchester City supporters was polarised, with some lukewarm about moving from Maine Road which had a reputation for being one of English football's most atmospheric grounds, whilst others were enthusiastic about the bigger stadium and move back to East Manchester where the club was formed. Since 2010, the club has boasted more than 36,000 season ticket holders each season, which is more than the 35,150 maximum capacity of Maine Road just before the club moved homes.

In a 2007, Premier League survey of fans of each club, the proportion of Manchester City fans assessing their sight lines as "very good" was the second highest in the Premier League, after the Emirates Stadium. Opposition fans have generally given positive feedback, with CoMS coming second to Old Trafford in a 2005 poll to find the United Kingdom's favourite football ground. In 2010, the City of Manchester Stadium was the third most visited stadium after Old Trafford and Anfield by overseas visitors.

In the early years of Manchester City's tenure, the stadium suffered from a poor atmosphere, a common problem with newly-opened stadia when compared with traditional football grounds such as Maine Road. In the 2007 Premier League survey, the proportion of Manchester City fans assessing match atmosphere as 'very good' was the second lowest in the Premier League, better only than Middlesbrough's Riverside stadium. The more recent expansion of capacity has been designed with improved atmosphere as a specific objective. Though not based on facts, the stadium is nicknamed the "Emptyhad" by rival fans in reference to poor game-day attendance and atmosphere.

In October 2014, the club received two national VisitFootball awards for the quality of its customer care of Premier League fans visiting the Etihad Stadium during the previous season. VisitFootball, a joint venture between the Premier League and the national tourism board's VisitEngland, has been assessing the care that patrons receive at football grounds since August 2010, and presents annual awards for those clubs who deliver outstanding customer service. Manchester City had been one of the first four clubs to receive an inaugural VisitFootball award in 2011; but, in 2014 it was the recipient of both the Club of the Year and Warmest Welcome awards. According to the panel of experts from the football and customer service industries that assess the services and facilities provided at each of the twenty Premier League club stadia, "Manchester City are the gold standard in providing fans with the best matchday experience."

== Etihad Campus ==
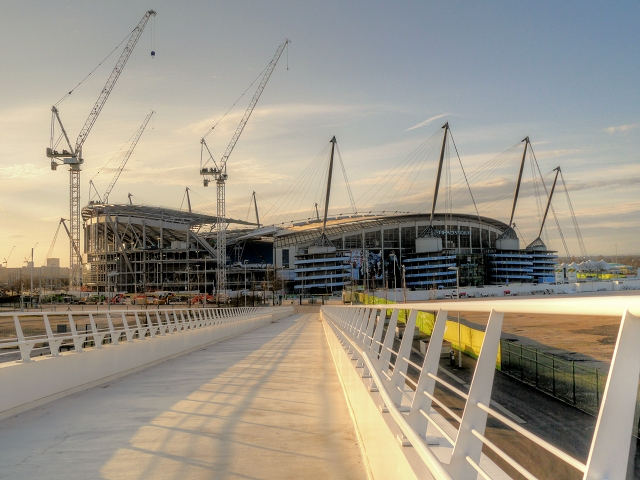
Etihad Stadium, viewed in March 2015 from the new SuisseGas Bridge

=== Etihad Campus and CFA ===
In July 2011, the venue was renamed the Etihad Stadium, sponsored by Etihad Airways who fought off competition from Ferrostaal and Aabar to gain the stadium naming rights. The lucrative ten-year sponsorship deal included not just the naming rights to the stadium itself but to the whole Etihad Campus, a £200 million complex of football-related facilities into which it would be incorporated. In mid-September 2011, development plans were duly announced for a new state-of-the-art youth academy and training facility, now known as the City Football Academy (CFA) to be built on derelict land adjacent to the stadium and which would include a 7,000-capacity mini-stadium plus 15 additional outdoor football pitches, six swimming pools and three gyms. The planned CFA facility was not only to become the new home base of the Manchester City first team squad, reserve (under-21 youth) team squad, and all of the Academy younger age group squads, but also the new home of the prior loosely affiliated Manchester City Ladies team (which was re-branded in 2012 as Manchester City Women and more formally merged into the Manchester City family of affiliated football teams). Also fully integrated into the new CFA facility would be the parent club's world headquarters.

At the beginning of March 2014, the structural framework for a new pedestrian walkway/footbridge over the junction of Alan Turing Way and Ashton New Road connecting the CFA with the Etihad Stadium was lowered into place. With sponsor Suisse Power & Gas SA having subsequently secured the naming rights, the completed SuisseGas Bridge was officially opened and turned over to Manchester City Council for general public access on 26 November 2014. Twelve days later, the Chancellor of the Exchequer, George Osborne, presided over the official opening of the CFA.

=== Community outreach and urban regeneration ===
As part of Manchester City's commitment to community outreach in their redevelopment plans for the areas of East Manchester adjacent to the Etihad Stadium, other urban regeneration plans incorporated into the overall Etihad Campus development project include the new £43 million Beswick Community Hub, that includes Connell Sixth Form College; a community leisure centre (with swimming pool, dance studio, health and fitness gym, rugby pitch, and grass sports pitches); and a planned Manchester Institute of Health and Performance. On 26 November 2014, the same day the SuisseGas Bridge was officially opened, a "globally admired" grouping of stainless steel sculptures, consisting of three towering metallic chess pieces called Dad's Halo Effect by its internationally acclaimed creator, Ryan Gander, was likewise unveiled to the public. Commissioned by the Manchester City Council to represent both the past industrial and current sporting heritage of this area of east Manchester, the public artwork is located in front of the Connell Sixth Form College, close to the central circus of the Beswick Community Hub, and only a few hundred yards south from where the area's last public sculpture, B of the Bang, had been situated.

== Transport ==
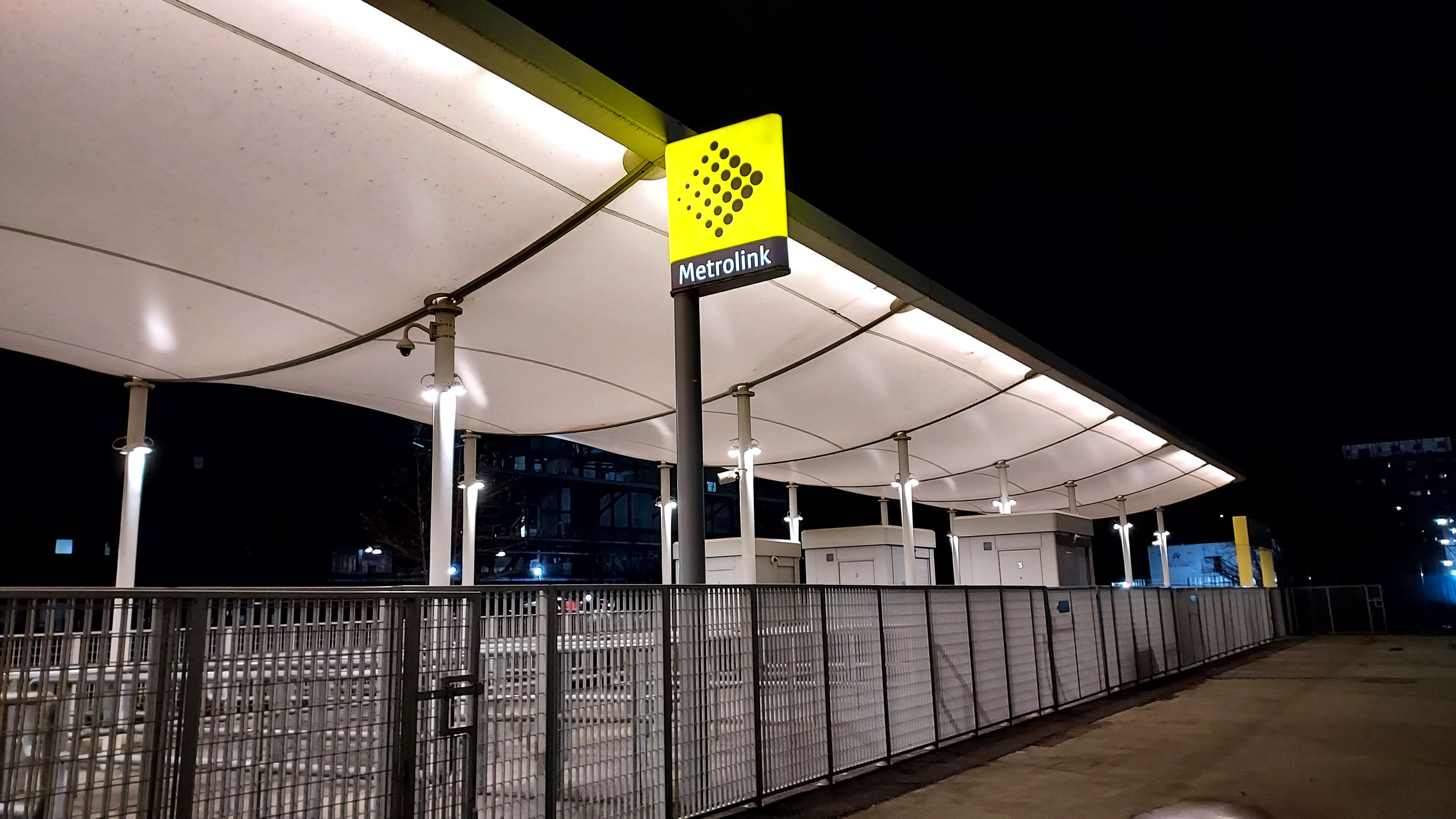
Entrance of the Etihad Campus tram stop

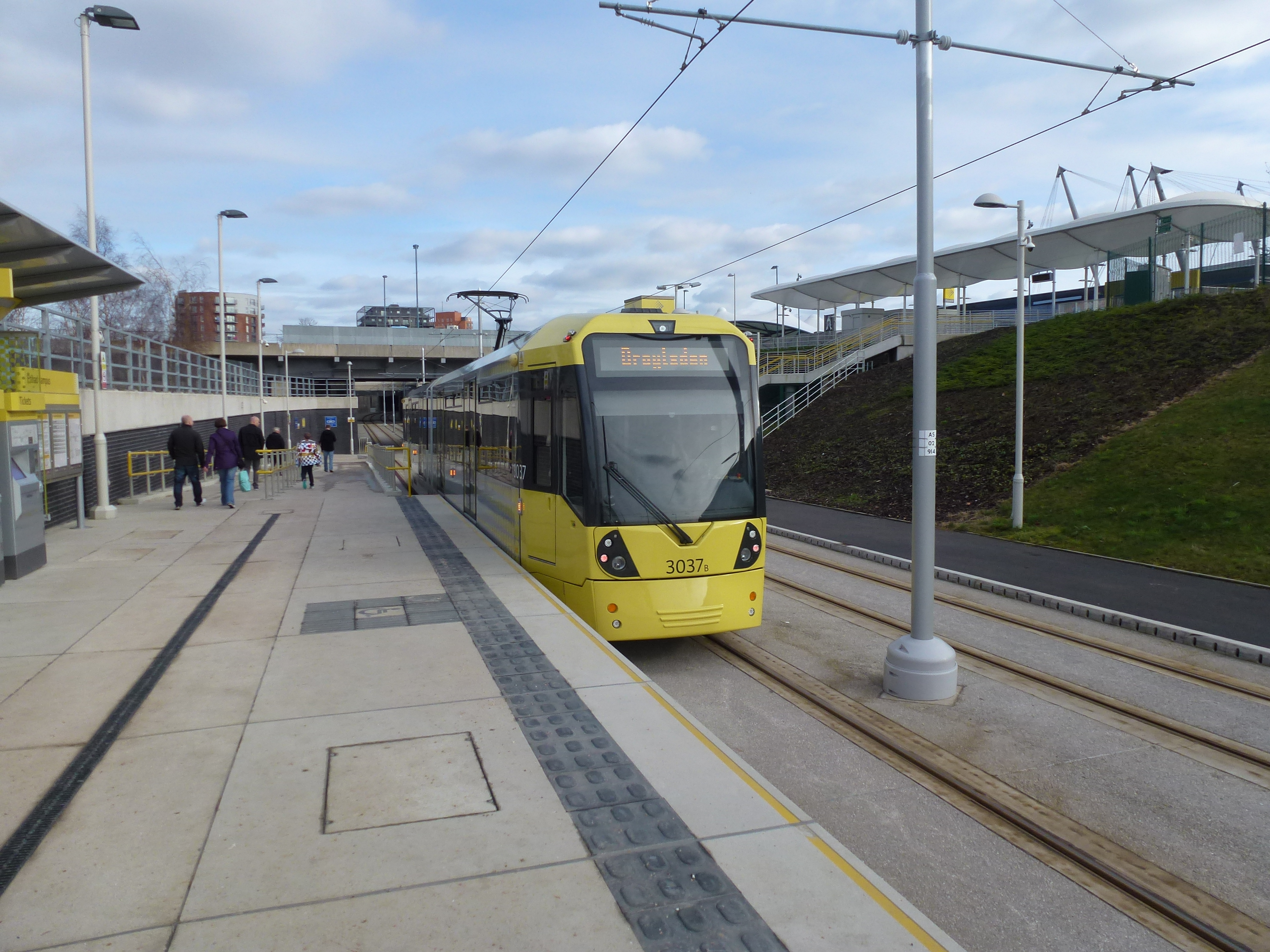
Tram departing the outbound platform of the tram stop

The stadium is 2.5 km east of Manchester city centre. Manchester Piccadilly railway station, which serves mainline trains, is a 20-minute walk away along a well-lit, signposted route that is supervised by stewards close to the ground. Piccadilly station also has a Metrolink tram stop (in the undercroft); from which regular trams along the East Manchester Line to Ashton-under-Lyne serve the stadium and Etihad Campus, with enhanced service frequencies and doubled tram units on matchdays. The Etihad Campus tram stop close to Joe Mercer Way to the immediate north of the stadium opened in February 2013, and handles several thousand travellers each matchday; spectators travelling by tram from Manchester city centre being able to board services at Piccadilly Gardens, the journey taking approximately 10 minutes. The Velopark tram stop also opened in February 2013 and provides access to the southeastern approach to the stadium, as well as closer access to other areas of SportCity such as the Manchester Velodrome and the City Football Academy.

There are many bus routes from the city centre and all other directions which stop at, or close to, SportCity. On match and event days, special bus services from the city centre serve the stadium. The site has 2,000 parking spaces, with another 8,000 spaces in the surrounding area provided by local businesses and schools.

== Other uses ==
Concerts at Eastlands
Summer	Artist
2004	Red Hot Chili Peppers
2005	Oasis, U2
2006	Take That, Bon Jovi
2007	George Michael, Rod Stewart
2008	Foo Fighters, Bon Jovi
2009; 2010	None – due to concerns over pitch erosion
2011	Take That, Pet Shop Boys
2012	Coldplay, Bruce Springsteen
2013	Muse, Bon Jovi, Robbie Williams
2014	One Direction
2015	None – due to South Stand expansion
2016	AC/DC, The Stone Roses, Coldplay, Bruce Springsteen
2017	Robbie Williams, Take That (Note: Take That were originally scheduled to play three concerts at the Manchester Arena on 26, 27 and 28 May 2017. However following the Manchester Arena bombing on 22 May, the Arena temporarily closed for four months. The three concerts were subsumed into one and held at the Etihad Stadium on 18 June.)
2018	Taylor Swift, Ed Sheeran, Foo Fighters, Beyoncé & Jay-Z
2019	Metallica, Spice Girls, Muse
2022	Liam Gallagher, Ed Sheeran
2023	Coldplay, The Weeknd
2024; 2025	None – due to North Stand development
2026	Take That, Playboi Carti, The Weeknd
2027	Oasis

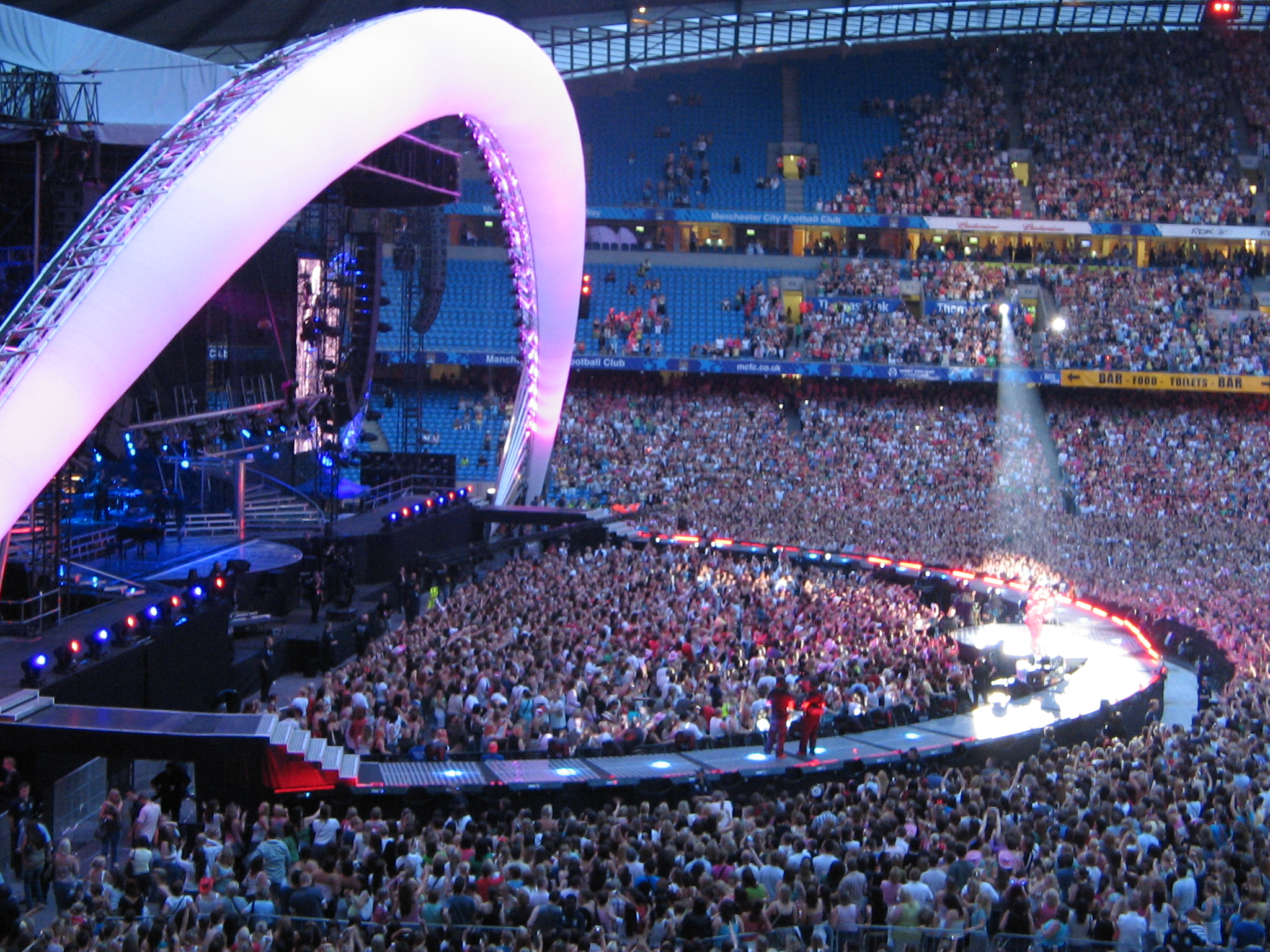
Side view of Take That on stage

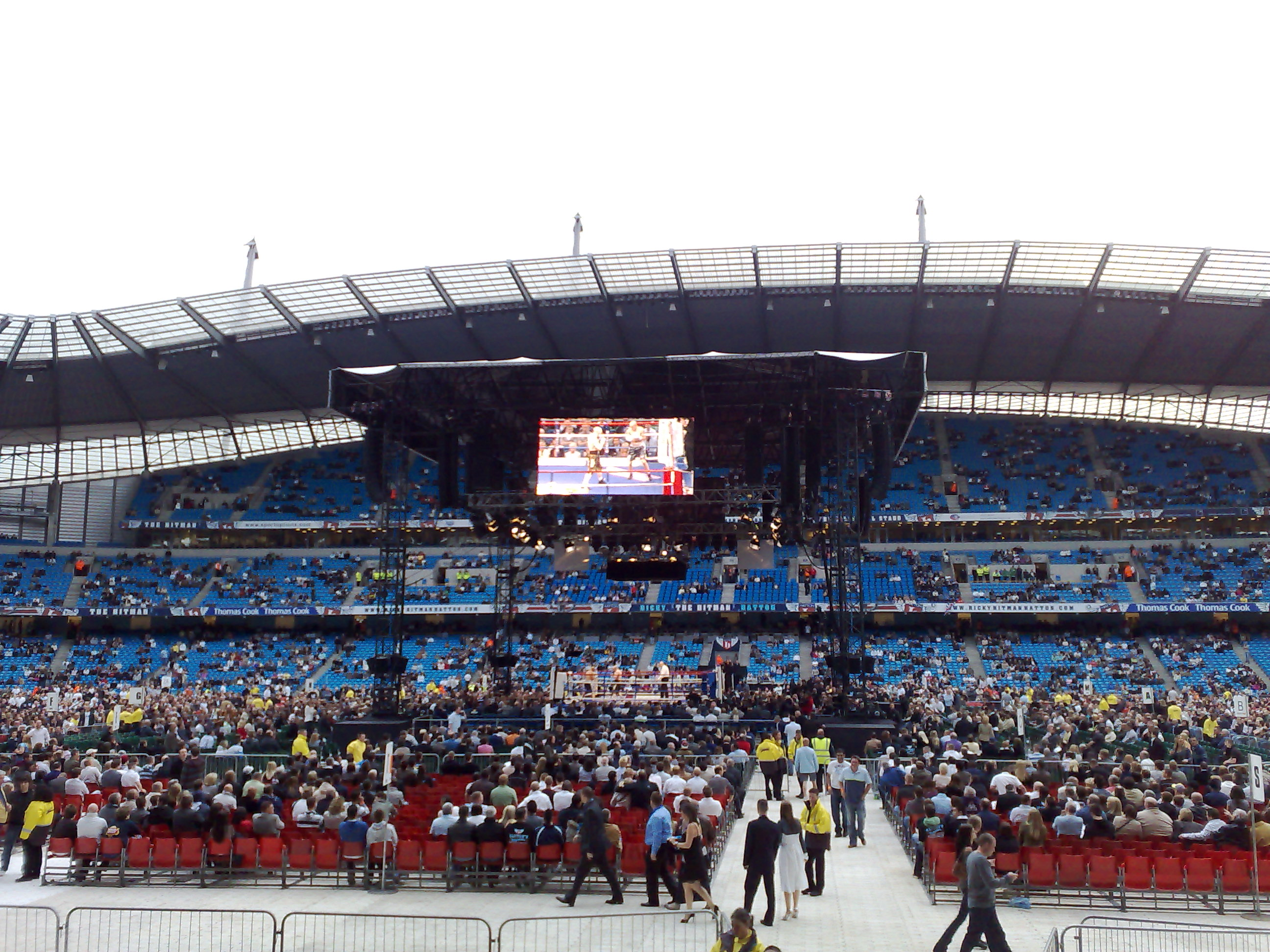
Boxing ring at Hatton's title fight

Under the terms of its lease, the stadium is able to host non-football events such as concerts, boxing and rugby fixtures at Manchester City's prerogative. Manchester City applied for a permanent entertainment licence in 2012 in a bid to expand the number of non-footballing events at the stadium.

=== Concerts ===
Outside the football season, the stadium hosts annual summer concerts, and is one of the United Kingdom's largest music venues, having a maximum capacity of 60,000 for performances. It was the largest stadium concert venue in England before the new Wembley Stadium was built.

The first concert was a performance by the Red Hot Chili Peppers supported by James Brown in 2004. An Oasis concert at the ground was featured on the DVD, Lord Don't Slow Me Down and the band's concert in 2005 set the attendance record of 60,000. Take That released a DVD of their 2006 performance at the stadium, Take That: The Ultimate Tour. Other artists who have played the stadium are U2, Beyoncé, Jay-Z, George Michael, Rod Stewart, Foo Fighters, Pet Shop Boys, Manic Street Preachers, Bastille, Dizzee Rascal, The Futureheads, the Sugababes, Taylor Swift, Metallica, Sophie Ellis-Bextor, Coldplay, Bruce Springsteen, Muse, Bon Jovi (three times), Robbie Williams, One Direction, The Stone Roses and the Spice Girls. It also hosted Liam Gallagher for his homecoming gig in 2022. Canadian artist the Weeknd performed there as part of his After Hours til Dawn Stadium Tour in 2023, and is set to re-perform here in 2026 as part of his co-headlining tour extension with Playboi Carti. Oasis is set to return on their Oasis Live '27 Tour in 2027 for a record 11 nights at the stadium.

Concerts and boxing matches eventually took their toll on the pitch. In 2008, late post-concert pitch renovation, combined with an early start to the football season, led to the pitch not being ready for the first home fixture, causing the club to play its UEFA Cup first round qualifying match at Barnsley's Oakwell Stadium and a moratorium to be imposed on the staging of non-football events at Eastlands. In May 2010, the club invested in a new pitch and summer concerts resumed in 2011 when Take That played eight nights, with ticket sales totalling approximately 400,000.

=== Other football events ===
The City of Manchester Stadium has hosted several major football matches in addition to Manchester City's home fixtures. It became the fiftieth stadium to host an England international football match when the English and Japanese national teams played on 1 June 2004. In June 2005, the stadium hosted England's opening game in the UEFA Women's Championship, setting an attendance record of 29,092 for the competition. The stadium also hosted the 2008 UEFA Cup final, in which Zenit Saint Petersburg defeated Rangers 2–0.

In May 2011, the stadium hosted the Conference National play-off final between AFC Wimbledon and Luton Town; Wimbledon gained promotion to the Football League after beating Luton in a penalty shoot-out. The stadium was used for the play-offs because the 2011 UEFA Champions League Final was due to take place at Wembley on 28 May 2011 and UEFA regulations stipulate the stadium hosting the Champions League final must not be used for other matches during the previous two weeks.

==== UEFA Euro 2028 ====
Date	Time (BST)	Team #1	Result	Team #2	Round	Spectators
10 June 2028	--:--	England (if Qualified)	–	B2	Group B	
13 June 2028	--:--	F3	–	F4	Group F	
16 June 2028	--:--	D2	–	D4	Group D	
20 June 2028	--:--	C4	–	C1	Group C	
25 June 2028	--:--	Winner Group C	–	3rd Group D/E/F	Round of 16	

=== Other sports ===
In October 2004, the stadium played host to a rugby league international match between Great Britain and Australia in the Tri-Nations series in front of nearly 40,000 spectators. The stadium also hosted the Magic Weekend for three consecutive seasons (2012–2014). After a record attendance in 2012 – both for a single day (32,953) and the aggregate for the whole weekend (63,716) – the Etihad Stadium became the venue of choice for this annual rugby league event, setting another attendance record (36,339/64,552) for it in May 2014. However, construction work involved with the expansion of the South Stand caused it to be relocated to St. James' Park, Newcastle, for summer 2015.

On 24 May 2008, Stockport born and twice IBF and IBO light welterweight champion boxer Ricky Hatton defeated Juan Lazcano in a contest billed as "Hatton's Homecoming". The fight was held in front of 56,337 fans, setting a record attendance for a British boxing event post World War II.

On 10 October 2015, the stadium hosted a 2015 Rugby World Cup Pool A match between hosts nation England and Uruguay. England won 60–3 with 50,778 in attendance.

== England national football games ==
1 June 2004 FA Summer Tournament	England	1–1	Japan	Manchester, England
20:00 BST (UTC+01); Match 812	Owen 22'	Report	Ono 53'	Stadium: City of Manchester Stadium; Attendance: 38,581; Referee: Roberto Rosetti (Italy)

5 June 2004 FA Summer Tournament	England	6–1	Iceland	Manchester, England
15:30 BST (UTC+01); Match 813	Lampard 25'; Rooney 27', 38'; Vassell 57', 77'; Bridge 68'	Report	Helguson 42'	Stadium: City of Manchester Stadium; Attendance: 43,500; Referee: Jan Wegereef (Netherlands)

22 May 2016 International friendly	England	2–1	Turkey	Manchester, England
17:15 BST; Match 953	Kane 3'; Vardy 83'	Report	Çalhanoğlu 13'	Stadium: Etihad Stadium; Attendance: 44,866; Referee: Deniz Aytekin (Germany)

== See also ==
- List of Commonwealth Games venues
- List of Premier League stadiums

=== Notes ===
Preceded by Bukit Jalil National Stadium; Kuala Lumpur	Commonwealth Games; Main stadium 2002	Succeeded by Melbourne Cricket Ground; Melbourne
Preceded by Hampden Park; Glasgow	UEFA Cup; Final venue 2008	Succeeded by Şükrü Saracoğlu Stadium; Istanbul
