= Alexander Farquharson (athlete) =

British athlete (born 1997)

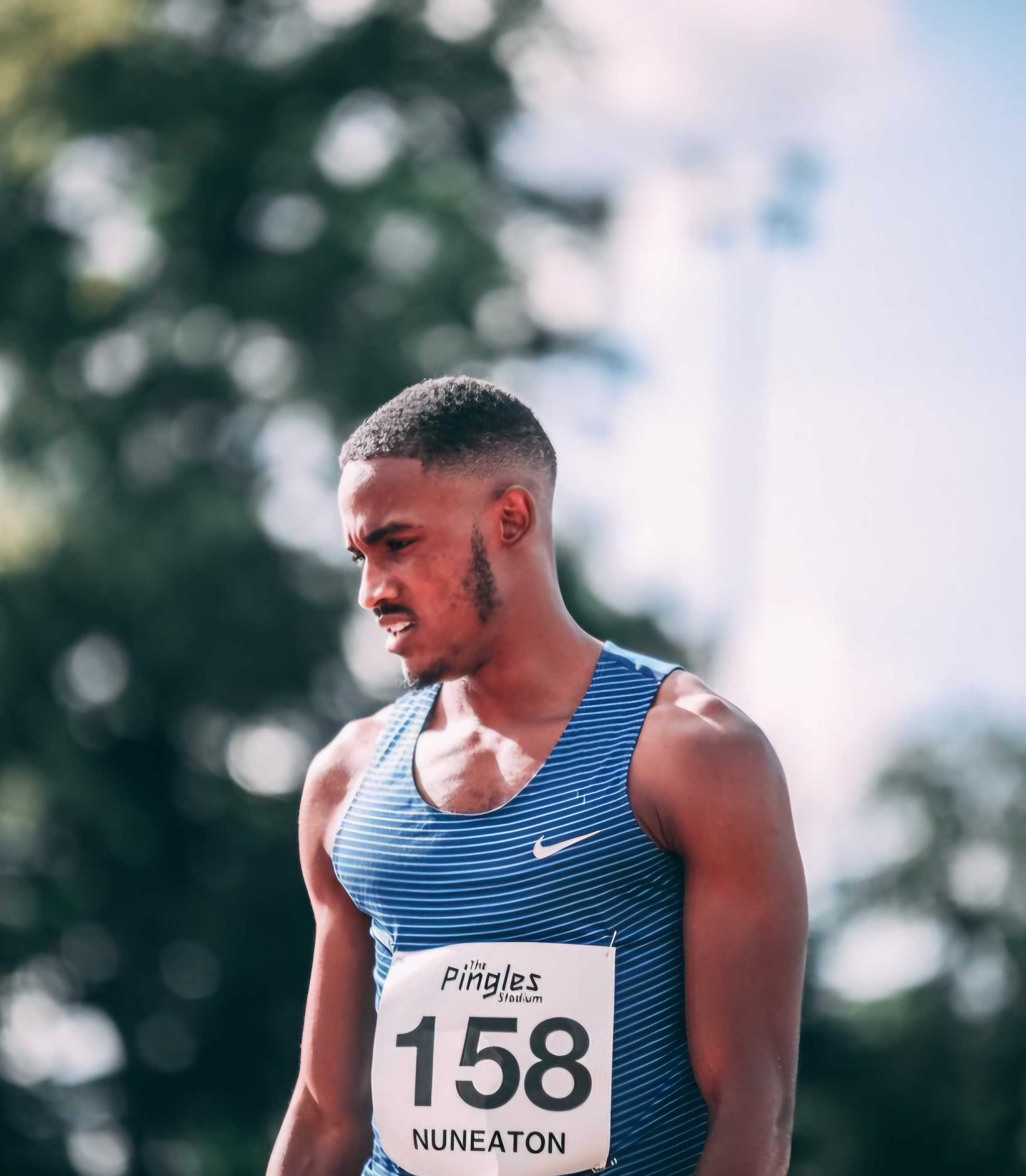

Personal information
- Nationality: British (English)
- Born: 9 June 1997 (age 29)

Sport
- Sport: Track and Field
- Events: Long jump, triple jump
- Club: Birchfield Harriers
Medal record
Representing England
British Championships
Gold medal – first place	2021 Manchester	Long jump

Alexander Farquharson (born 9 June 1997) is a British athlete specialising in the long jump. He is a former British champion in the long jump, gaining titles from both 2021 outdoor championships and 2024 indoor championships

== Biography ==
Farquharson came to prominence in 2021, after winning the British javelin title at the 2021 British Athletics Championships.

In 2024, he represented and helped England win the Loughborough International.

At the 2024 British Athletics Championships he won the silver medal behind Jacob Fincham-Dukes.
