= Niclas Baker =

British sprinter (born 1994)

Personal information
- Nationality: British (English)
- Born: 9 September 1994 (age 31) London, England

Sport
- Sport: Athletics
- Event: 400m
- Club: Crawley AC
Medal record
Representing Great Britain

Niclas James Baker (born 9 September 1994) is a British athlete who competes in the sprints, predominantly the 400 metres.

== Biography ==
His current athletics club is Piotr Spas in Tooting. Baker won silver in the 400m at the British Championships in 2020, missing out on gold by less than 2 tenths of a second to Alex Knibbs.

On 26 June 2021, Baker went one better than his result in the previous year by winning the 400m title at the 2021 British Athletics Championships. Three days later, he was named in the sprinter pool for the 4 x 400 metres relay at the delayed 2020 Summer Olympics in Tokyo.
