= KSS Design Group =

British design group

- Industry: Architecture and Design
- Founded: 1991
- Founders: David Keirle, Andy Simons, Martin Salter
- Headquarters: London, England
- Number of locations: London and Sevenoaks
- Area served: Worldwide
- Services: Architecture, interior design, graphic design and branding
- Number of employees: 100
- Website: http://www.kssgroup.com

KSS is a design group founded in 1991 that specializes in architecture, interior design, branding and graphics.

Their first major sports stadium project was the redevelopment of Stamford Bridge in 1991, commissioned by former Chelsea FC chairman Ken Bates, integrating retail, commercial, hotel and residential usages around the football stadium. Recent years have seen the completion of Falmer Stadium in Brighton, Twickenham Stadium Players’ Facilities, London 2012 Basketball Arena, Tottenham Hotspur FC’s training centre and Brighton & Hove Albion FC’s training complex.

The practice has recently completed the Main Stand expansion at Anfield for Liverpool FC, Sammy Ofer Stadium in Haifa, Israel which achieved UEFA Category 4 status, and Stade Océane in La Havre, France, which is Europe’s first energy positive stadium.

KSS have recently unveiled plans for Crystal Palace FC's Selhurst Park redevelopment and new training facilities for Leicester City FC and Liverpool FC.

KSS has also acted as technical advisers for Manchester City F.C.'s move from Maine Road to the City of Manchester Stadium which hosted the 2002 Commonwealth Games and was also the external technical reviewer for post-2012 Summer Olympics transformation at the Olympic Stadium.
