= Gracie Griffiths =

British athlete (born 2006)

Personal information
- Nationality: British (Welsh)
- Born: 19 July 2006 (age 19)

Sport
- Sport: Track and Field
- Event: 5K walk
- Club: Pembrokeshire Harriers
Medal record
Representing Wales
British Championships
Gold medal – first place	2024 Manchester	5000 walk

Gracie Griffiths (born 19 July 2006) is a Welsh athlete. In 2024, she became British champion in the 5000m race walk.

== Career ==
Griffiths, from Pembrokeshire, came to prominence as a 15 year-old when she set a Welsh U17 record in finishing second at the 2022 British Athletics Championships in Manchester.

She won the 2024 British Athletics Championships in the 5000m race walk in Manchester in June 2024, finishing in a time of 23:53.93.
