= Eden Robinson (athlete) =

British athlete (born 2006)

Personal information
- Nationality: British (Welsh)
- Born: 27 November 2006 (age 19)

Sport
- Sport: Athletics
- Event: Hurdles

Achievements and titles
- Personal bests: 100m hurdles: 14.03s (2024); Long jump 6.05m (2024); Heptathlon: 5648pts (2025)

Eden Robinson (born 27 November 2006) is a Welsh multi-event athlete. She won the heptathlon at the 2024 British Athletics Championships and competed in the heptathlon for Great Britain at the 2024 World Athletics U20 Championships.

== Biography ==
She was educated at Millfield in Somerset. She is a member of the Cardiff Archers athletics club, in Cardiff, Wales.

=== 2023 ===
She was the 2023 England under-17 heptathlon silver medallist. In September 2023, she finished third in the heptathlon at the English Schools Combined Event & Race Walk Championships, in Bedford, behind winner Thea Brown. Robinson's tally of 5213 points moved her to eighth on the British U-17 all-time list, ahead of Katarina Johnson-Thompson.

=== 2024 ===
She won the heptathlon title at the 2024 British Athletics Championships in Birmingham, with a tally of 5597 points.

She was selected for the long jump competition for the British under-20 team at the Mannheim International in Germany in June 2024. She competed in the heptathlon, at the age of 17 years-old, at the 2024 World Athletics U20 Championships in Lima, Peru, placing fifth overall and moving third on the Welsh all-time rankings for the heptathlon with a tally of 5597 points. Her performance included a personal best of 14.03 in the 100m hurdles. In October 2024, she was named Welsh junior athlete of the year.

=== 2025 ===
In November 2024, she was named by British Athletics on the Olympic Futures Programme for 2025. She was named in the British team for the heptathlon at the 2025 European Athletics U20 Championships in Tampere. At the championships, she set a personal best 13.82s in the 100m hurdles, before equalling her personal best in the high jump with 1.62 metres. With 13.99m in the shot put, she had the second-furthest distance in the field and placed fourth after the first day of competition before finishing the contest on day in fifth place with a total of 5648 points. In October 2025, she was retained on the British Athletics Olympic Futures Programme for 2025/26.

=== 2026 ===
Competing for the University of Florida, Robinson scored 5,558 points for the heptathlon at the SEC Championships in May 2026. Her performances included personal bests of 2:14.35 in the 800 metres and 35.96m in the javelin. In October 2026, she was retained on the 2026/27 Olympic Futures Programme awarded by UK Athletics.

== Personal life ==
She is the daughter of British long jumper Michelle Griffith-Robinson and Welsh rugby union international player Matthew Robinson. She has siblings Reese and Elijah.
