= Oliver Dustin =

British middle-distance runner

Personal information
- Nationality: British (English)
- Born: 29 November 2000 (age 25) Workington, England

Sport
- Sport: Athletics
- Event: 800 m
- Club: Border Harriers

Achievements and titles
- Personal best: 800 m: 1:43.82 (Nice 2021)
Medal record
Men's athletics
Representing Great Britain
European U20 Championships
Gold medal – first place	2019 Borås	800 m

Oliver Luke Dustin (born 29 November 2000) is a British middle-distance runner who competed at the 2020 Summer Olympics.

== Biography ==
Dustin is a native of Workington and attends Birmingham University. On 12 June 2021 in Nice, Dustin ran the 800 metres in a time of 1.43.82. With this he broke Seb Coe’s under 23 British record and was the 5th fastest all-time by a British runner. It was also temporarily the world-leading time for the year.

On the 27 June 2021 at the British Championship and Olympic Trials event in Manchester, Dustin finished second in the 800 metres to Elliot Giles, which qualified him for the 2020 Olympics.

At the delayed 2020 Olympic Games in Tokyo, he represented Great Britain in the 800 metres event.
