= Daniel Bainbridge =

British javelin thrower

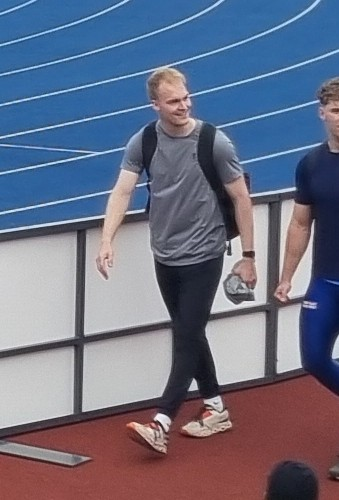
- 2025 UK Athletics Championships

Personal information
- Nationality: British (English)
- Born: 2 June 1999 (age 27)

Sport
- Sport: Track and Field
- Event: Javelin throw
- Club: Shaftesbury Barnet Harriers
Medal record
Representing England
British Championships
Gold medal – first place	2021 Manchester	javelin

Daniel Bainbridge (born 2 June 1999) is a British athlete specialising in the Javelin throw. He is a former British champion in the javelin.

== Career ==
Bainbridge came to prominence in 2016 after being selected by Great Britain for the European Youth Championships in Tbilisi.

After winning the English under-20 men's javelin title in 2018 Bainbridge became a British champion in 2021, winning the javelin title at the 2021 British Athletics Championships, with a throw of 72.66 metres.
