= Manchester Sport and Leisure Trust =

Manchester Sport and Leisure Trust is a non-profit organisation which manages sport and leisure venues in the City of Manchester, United Kingdom. MSLT was founded in 1997 and is a company limited by guarantee with charitable status with a turnover of £12.5m. MSLT is based at the Sportcity site.

== Operations ==
MSLT manages:

- Abraham Moss Leisure Centre
- Arcadia Leisure Centre, Levenshulme
- Ardwick Sports Hall
- Belle Vue Leisure Centre
- Broadway Leisure Centre, Moston
- Chorlton Leisure Centre
- Levenshulme Swimming Pools
- Manchester Aquatics Centre
- National Squash Centre
- Manchester Regional Arena
- Manchester Regional Gymnastic
- Manchester Regional Hockey
- Manchester Tennis & Football
- Miles Platting Swimming Pools
- Moss Side Leisure Centre
- National Cycling Centre
- North City Centre, Harpurhey
- Sportcity
- Ten Acres Leisure Centre, Newton Heath
- Withington Leisure Centre
