= Manchester Regional Arena =

Multipurpose stadium in Manchester, England

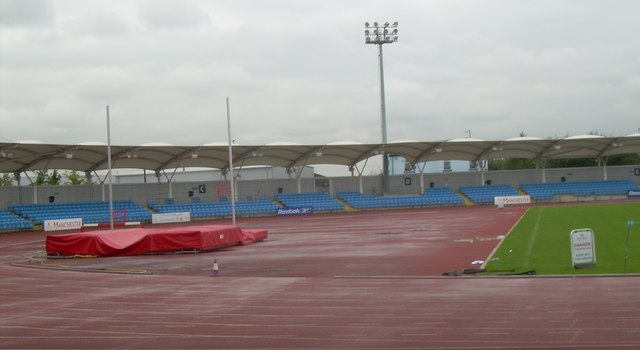
- Location: Sportcity, Manchester, England
- Coordinates: 53°29′2″N 2°12′14″W
- Owner: Manchester City Council
- Operator: Manchester Sport and Leisure Trust
- Capacity: 6,500
- Surface: Natural grass

Construction
- Opened: April 2002
- Cost: £3.5 million
- Architect: Faulkner Browns with TTH Architects
- Main contractor: John Laing

Tenants
- Athletics; AAA Championships; Paralympic World Cup (2005–present); Belle Vue Racers; Manchester Kestrels; Sale Harriers; Association Football; Manchester City Reserves (2003–2010); Manchester City Women(2003–2014); Northwich Manchester Villa (2015–2016); Manchester Central (2016–present); Rugby League; Manchester Rangers (2015–2019)

Manchester Regional Arena is a multipurpose stadium in Manchester, England, primarily used for athletics, football and rugby league.

== History ==
It was originally developed as the warm-up track for the 2002 Commonwealth Games held at the adjacent City of Manchester Stadium. It has hosted the AAA Championships and Paralympic World Cup, and was the reserve home ground of the Manchester City reserve team prior to moving to Ewen Fields in June 2010. It also served as the home of the Manchester City Ladies' side until their move to the adjacent Academy Stadium in the Etihad Campus in 2014.

With both Manchester City teams moving out of the ground by the beginning of 2015, their tenure was replaced by amateur rugby league side Manchester Rangers.
