= 1923 Women's Olympiad =

International sporting event

1923 Women's World Games
- Host city: Monte Carlo
- Country: Monaco
- Dates: 4–7 April 1923

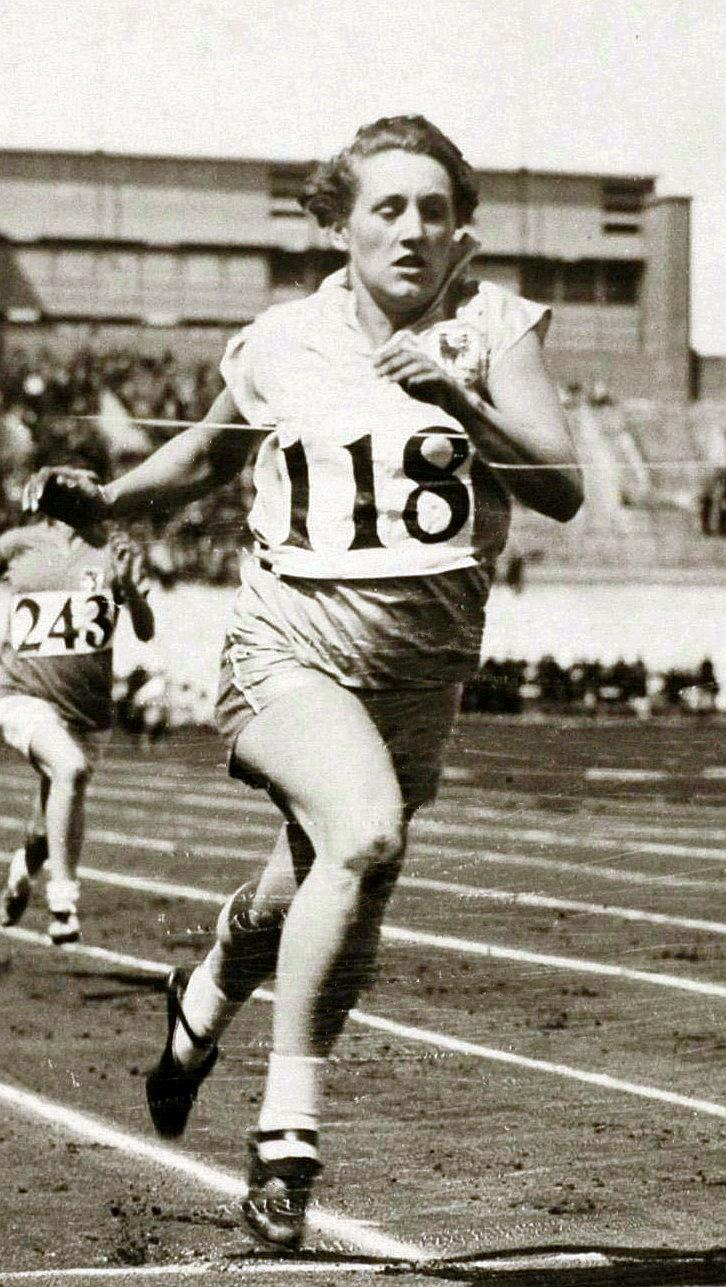
Georgette Gagneux

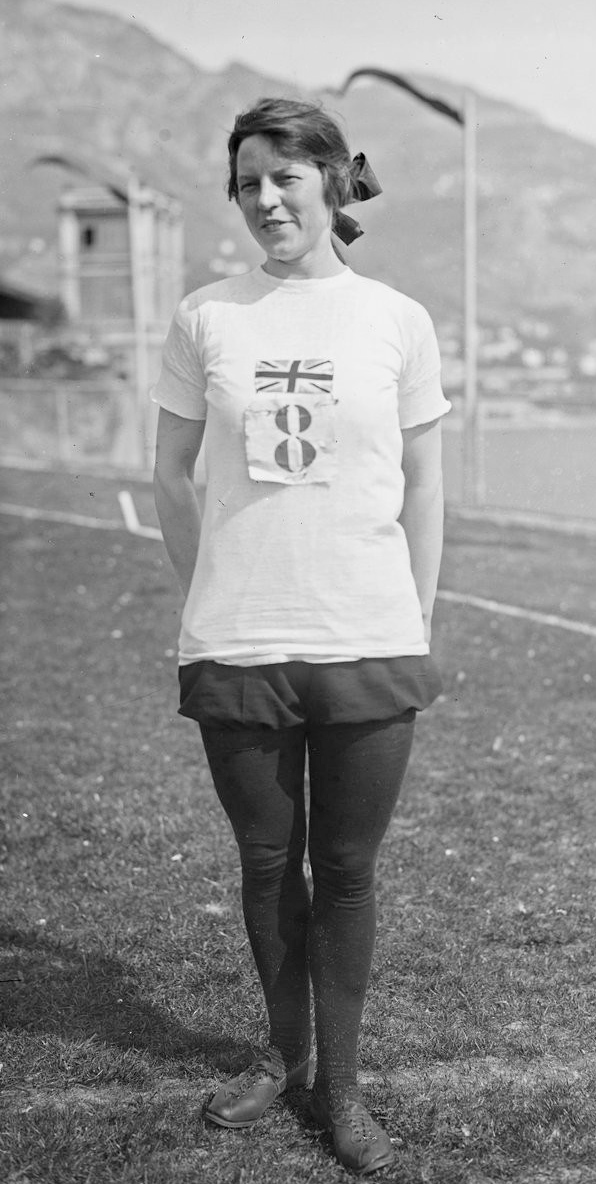
Mary Lines

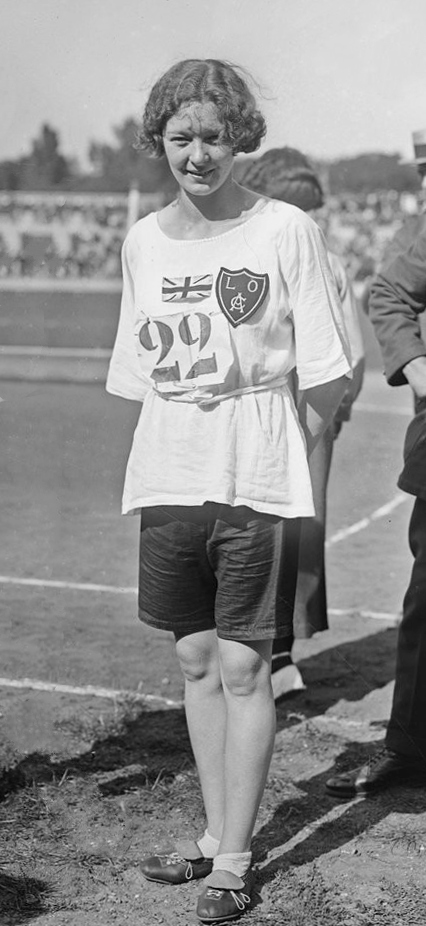
Hilda Hatt

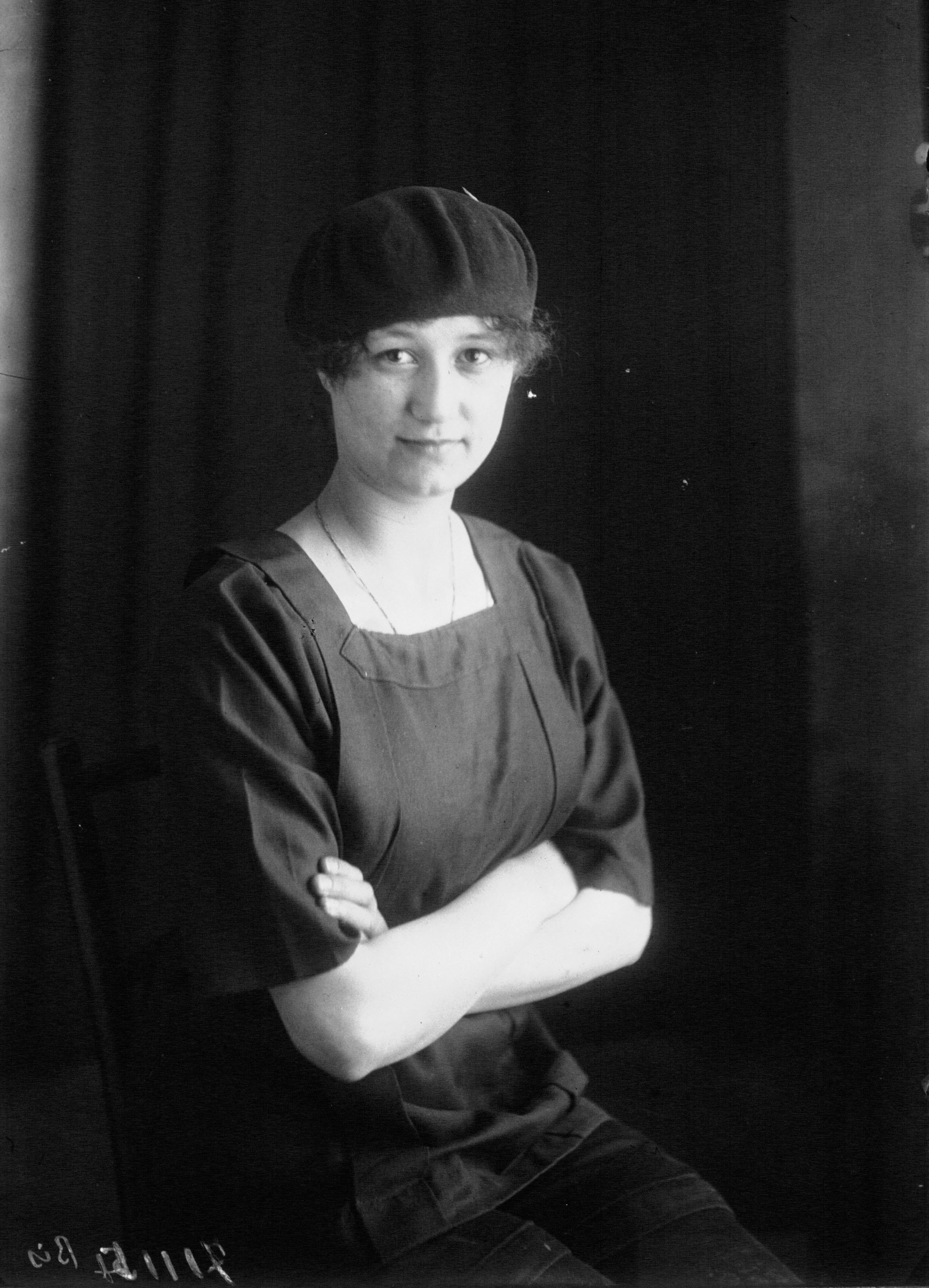
Thérèse Brulé

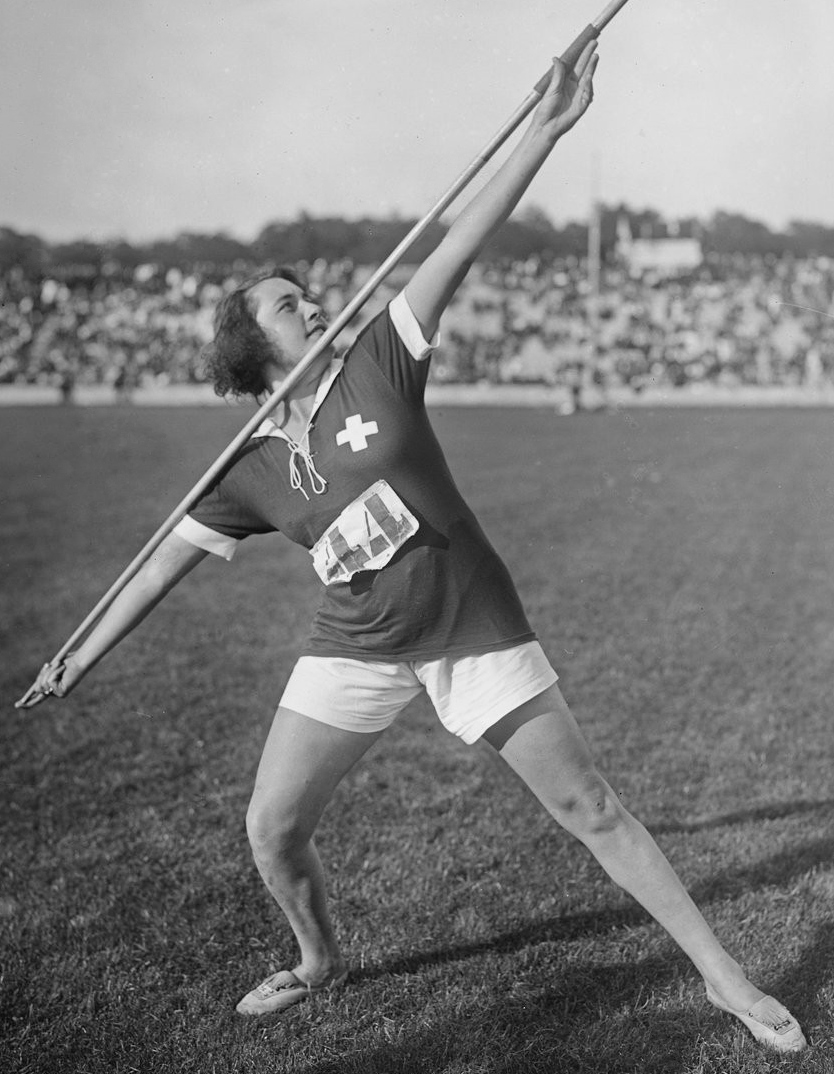
Francesca Pianzola

The 1923 Women's Olympiad (Jeux Athlétiques Féminins, Jeux Olympiques Féminins and Monte Carlo Games) was the fourth international event in women's sports, the tournament was held 4 to 7 April 1923 in Monte Carlo, Monaco. The tournament was formally called "Les Jeux Athlétiques Féminins à Monté Carlo". The games were a follow-up to the 1921 Women's Olympiad and 1922 Women's Olympiad.

== Events ==
The multi-sport event was as previous years organised by Fédération des Sociétés Féminines Sportives de France (FSFSF) under chairwoman Alice Milliat and Camille Blanc, director of the "International Sporting Club de Monaco" as a response to the International Olympic Committee (IOC) decision not to include women's events in the 1924 Olympic Games.

The games were attended by participants from 8 nations: Belgium, Czechoslovakia, Denmark, France, Italy, Monaco, Switzerland and the United Kingdom. The tournament was a huge promotion for women's sports.

Team	Nation	Participants
1	Belgium	?
2	Czechoslovakia	?
3	Denmark	?
4	France	?
5	Italy	?
6	Monaco	?
7	Switzerland	?
8	United Kingdom	?

The athletes competed in 11 events: running (60 metres, 250 metres, 800 metres, 4 x 75 metres relay, 4 x 175 metres relay and hurdling 65 metres), high jump, long jump, javelin, shot put and Athletics pentathlon. The tournament also held exhibition events in basketball, gymnastics and rhythmic gymnastics.

The tournament was held at the "Tir aux Pigeons" in the gardens Les jardins du Casino of the Monte Carlo Casino in the ward of Monte Carlo. Among the spectators were Prince Louis II, Princess Charlotte and Prince Pierre.

Prior to the tournament a gymnastics event ("La Quatrième Fête Fédérale de Gymnastique et d'Éducation Physique Féminines" in the ward of Fontvieille with about 1200 participants from 71 gymnastic clubs (this event is sometimes confused with the athletic event).

== Results ==
Almost all medals went to athletes from France and the United Kingdom, medalists for each event:

Event	Gold		Silver		Bronze	
60 metre	Nora Callebout; United Kingdom	7,9 sec	Ivy Lowman; United Kingdom	?	Georgette Gagneux; France	?
250 metre	Nora Callebout; United Kingdom	41,0 sec	Marie Mejzlíková I Czechoslovakia		Monnet; France	
800 metre	Marcelle Neveu; France	2.35,6 min	Mary Lines; United Kingdom		Hilda Hatt; United Kingdom	
4 x 75 m relay	Team England; United Kingdom		Team France; France		Team Czechoslovakia; Czechoslovakia	
4 x 175 m relay	Team England; United Kingdom		Team France; France		Team Belgium; Belgium	
Hurdles 65 metre	Ivy Lowman; United Kingdom	11,3 sec	Hermance Maes; Belgium		Thérèse Brulé; France	
High jump	Ivy Lowman; United Kingdom	1,47 m	Elise van Truyen; Belgium	1,44 m	Sophie Eliott-Lynn; United Kingdom	1,40 m
Long jump	Sylvia Stone; United Kingdom	4,85 m	Marie Mejzlíková I Czechoslovakia	4,71 m	Elise van Truyen; Belgium	4,61 m
Javelin, two-handed^{[nb]}	Louise Groslimond; Switzerland	44,94 m	Francesca Pianzola; Switzerland	44,88 m	Sophie Eliott-Lynn; United Kingdom	43,56 m
Shot put, two-handed^{[nb]} 3,628 kg	Marie Mejzlíková I Czechoslovakia	17,05 m	Florence Hurren; United Kingdom	16,60 m	Františka Vlachová; Czechoslovakia	16,11 m
Pentathlon	Simone Chapoteau; France		Ivy Lowman; United Kingdom		shared Sophie Eliott-Lynn; United Kingdom; Elise van Truyen; Belgium	

- ^{nb} Each athlete in the shot put and javelin throw events threw using their right hand, then their left. Their final mark was the total of the best mark with their right-handed throw and the best mark with their left-handed throw.

Sophie Eliott-Lynn later also competed at the 1926 Women's World Games in Gothenburg where she finished fourth in the javelin event.

Marie Janderová competed in the javelin event, her result of 25,50 metres was a world record, however she finished fifth in the totals with 42,11 metres.

World record holder in 800 metres Georgette Lenoir and world record holder in shot put Violette Morris also competed at the games but without gaining any medals.

The basketball tournament was won by Team France after a win in the final against Team England with 19-1.

A special commemorative medal was issued for the participants.

== Legacy ==
The tournament was a huge promotion for women's sports. However it was the last of three Women's Olympiads. The event continued as Women's World Games with the first event already being held in Paris in 1922. (Note: Women's teams from universities in the United Kingdom initiated women's inter-varsity competition in 1921 and the Inter-Varsity Athletics Board (IVAB) in England held its first inter-varsity track and field competition for women in 1922. The Women's Inter-Varsity Athletics Board (WIVAB) was formed in 1923.)

The first women's national championships in track and field were held after the inaugural 1922 Women's World Games and the 1921, 1922 and 1923 Women's Olympiads. In the United Kingdom, the Women's Amateur Athletic Association was founded in 1922 and held the first WAAA Championships the following year. In the United States, the 1923 USA Outdoor Track and Field Championships included a women's competition for the first time.
