= 1922 Women's Olympiad =

Monegasque women's sport's event

- Host city: Monte Carlo
- Country: Monaco
- Dates: 15–23 April 1922

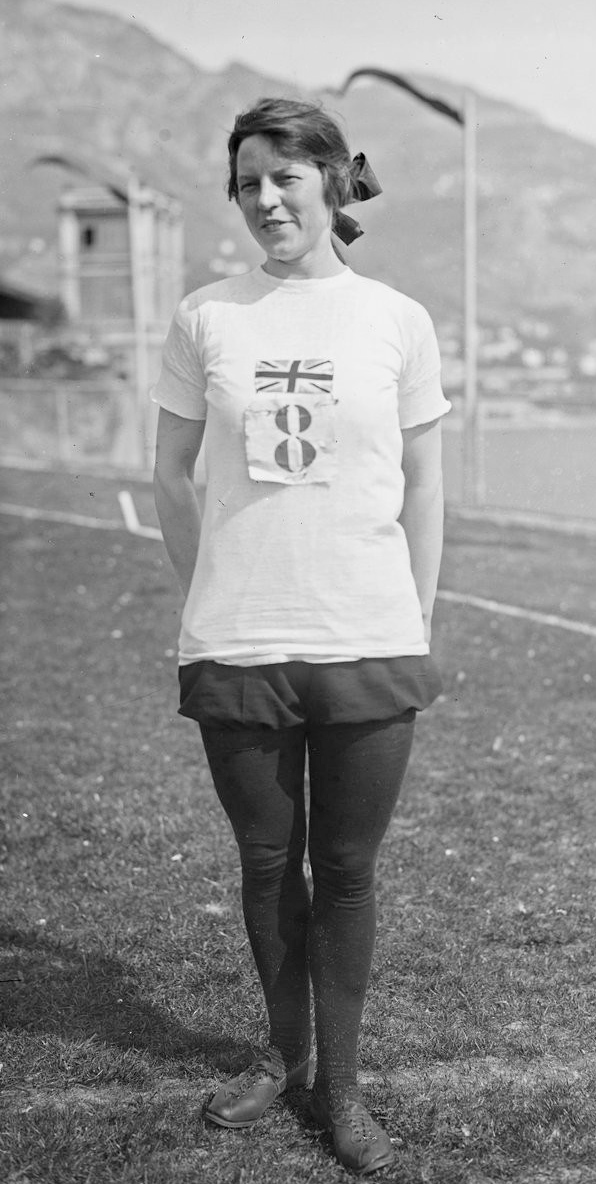
Mary Lines

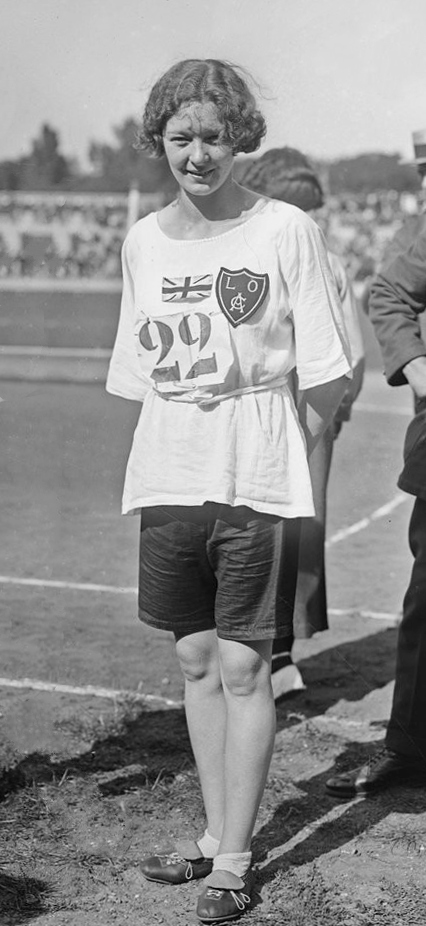
Hilda Hatt

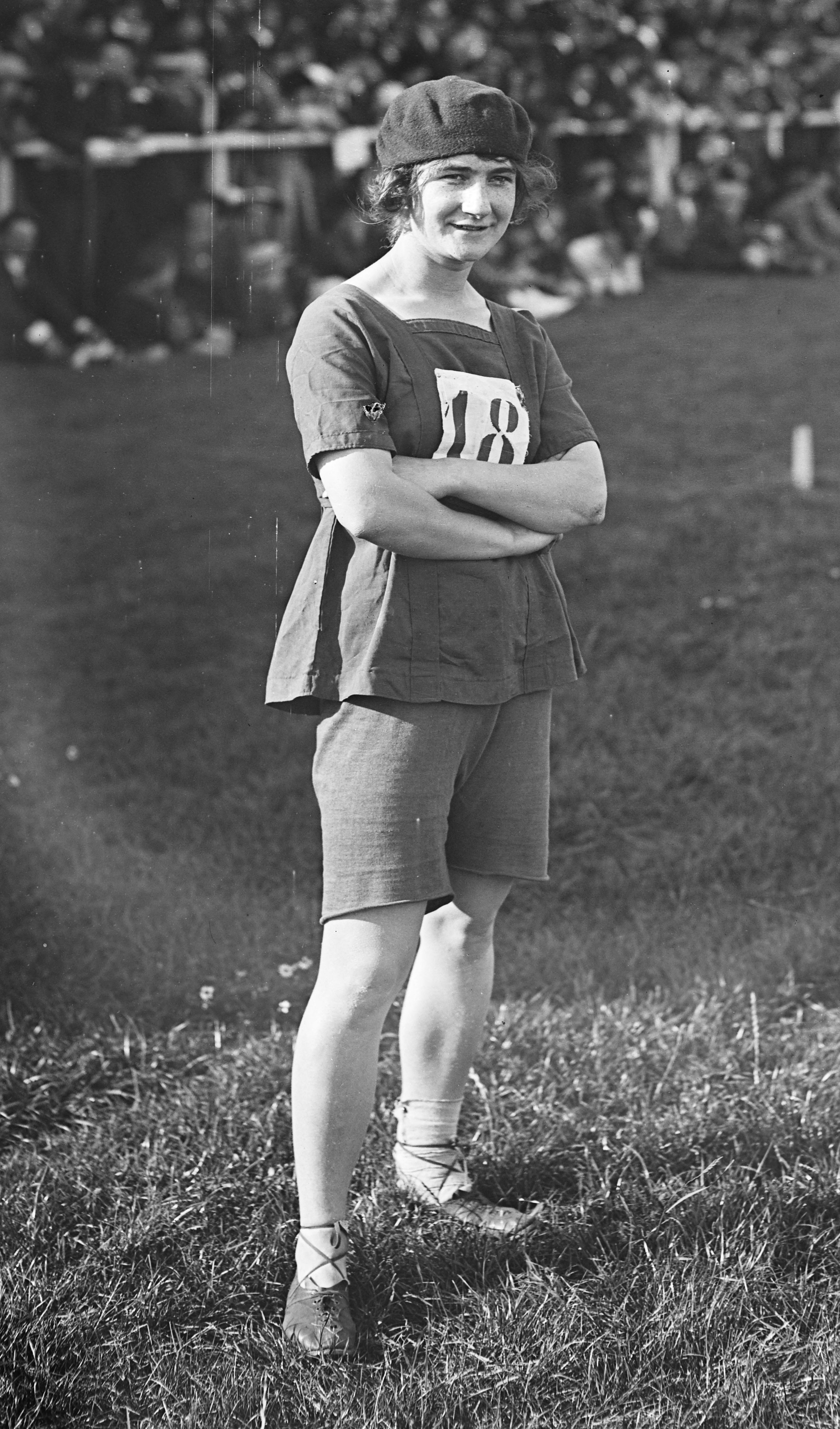
Germaine Delapierre

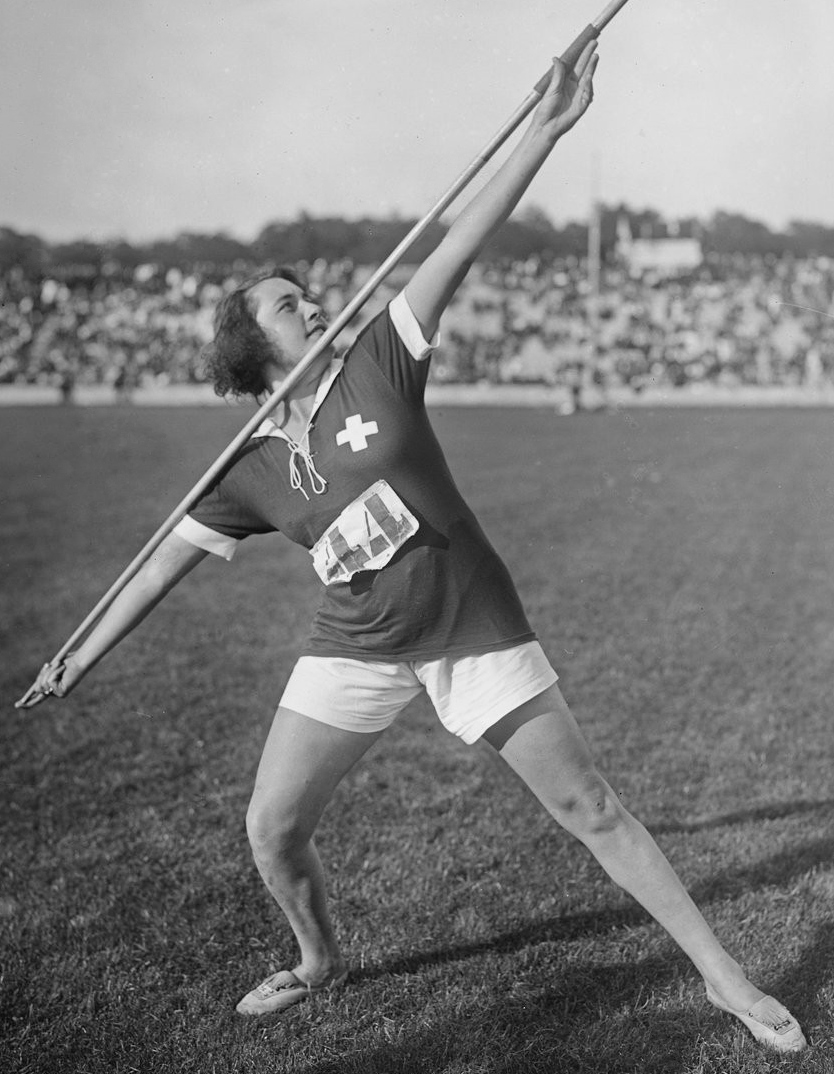
Francesca Pianzola

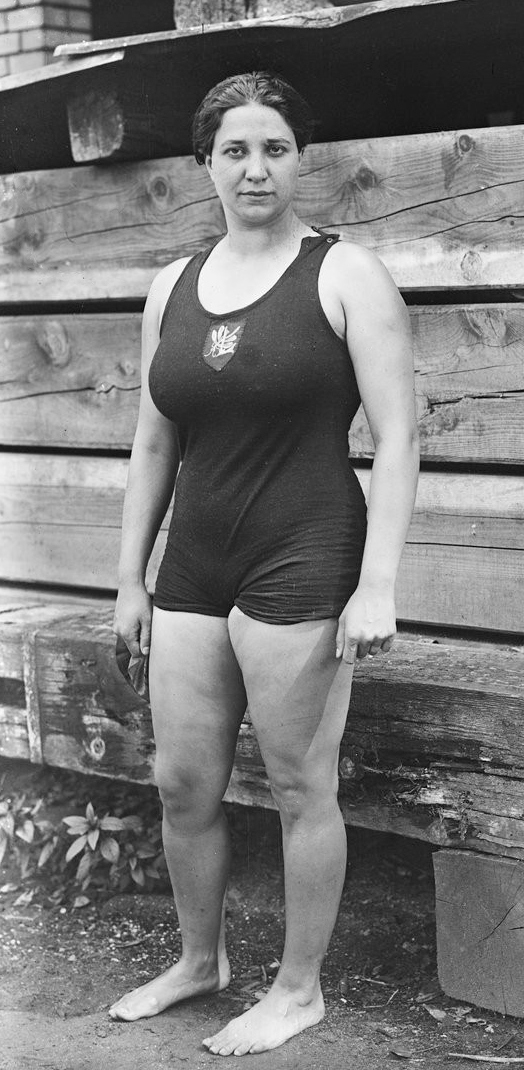
Violette Morris

The 1922 Women's Olympiad (Jeux Athlétiques Internationaux Féminins and Jeux Olympiques Féminins) was the second international women's sports event, a 7-day multi-sport event organised by Alice Milliat and held on 15– April 23 1922 in Monte Carlo at the International Sporting Club of Monaco. The tournament was formally called "Deuxiéme Meeting International d'Éducation Physique Féminine". It was also the second of three Women's Olympiads or "Monte Carlo Games" held annually at the venue in Monaco, and the second forerunner of the quadrennial Women's World Games, organised in 1922–34 by the International Women's Sports Federation founded by Milliat in late 1921.

== Events ==
The games were organized as the previous 1921 Women's Olympiad by Fédération des Sociétés Féminines Sportives de France (FSFSF) under Alice Milliat and Camille Blanc, director of the "International Sporting Club de Monaco" as a response to the International Olympic Committee (IOC) decision not to include women's events in the 1924 Olympic Games.

The games were attended by 300 participants from 7 nations: Belgium, Czechoslovakia, France, Italy, Norway (mentioned by several sources, however no Norwegian athletes appear in the result lists), Switzerland and the United Kingdom. The tournament was a huge promotion for women's sports.

| Team | Nation | Participants |
|---|---|---|
| 1 | Belgium | ? |
| 2 | Czechoslovakia | ? |
| 3 | France | ? |
| 4 | Italy | ? |
| 5 | Norway | ? |
| 6 | Switzerland | ? |
| 7 | United Kingdom | ? |

The athletes competed in 11 events: running (60 metres, 250 metres, 800 metres, 4 x 75 metres relay, 4 x 175 metres relay and hurdling 65 metres), high jump, long jump, javelin, shot put and Athletics pentathlon. The tournament also held exhibition events in basketball, cycling, gymnastics and rhythmic gymnastics.

The pentathlon event was the first recorded Women's pentathlon, the 5 events were 60 metres, 300 metres, high jump, javelin, and shot put (the throwing events were two-hand). Regular women's pentathlon was introduced at the 1934 Women's World Games in London

During the games there were also events held in water sports (among the first for women outside the Olympic Games) with swimming events, where teams from the Netherlands and Sweden also participated. Events were swimming 100 metres, 200 metres and 400 metres, relays and water polo.

The tournament was held partly at the "Stade Nautique du Port" at the Monaco harbour and partly at the "Tir aux Pigeons" in the gardens Les jardins du Casino of the Monte Carlo Casino.

== Results ==
=== Athletics ===
Almost all gold medals went to athletes from France and the United Kingdom, medalists for each event:

| Event | Gold | | Silver | | Bronze | |
|---|---|---|---|---|---|---|
| 60-metre | Nora Callebout; United Kingdom | 8,2 sec | Mary Lines; United Kingdom | ? | Bozena Srámková; Czechoslovakia | ? |
| 250-metre | Mary Lines; United Kingdom | 39,0 sec | Nelly Hicks; United Kingdom | | Alice Beuns; France | |
| 800-metre | Suzanne Porte; France | 2.37,6 | Marcelle Neveu; France | | Madeleine Dupont; France | |
| 4 x 75 m relay | Team FFFGS; France; France; Alice Gonnet; Lucie Prost; Paulette de Croze; Alice Beuns | 51,8 sec | Team England; United Kingdom; United Kingdom; Mary Lines; Ivy Lowman; Daisy Wright; Nora Callebout | | Team FSFSF; France; France; Germaine Delapierre; Cécile Maugars; Yvonne de Wynne; Andrée Patureau | |
| 4 x 175 m relay | Team England; United Kingdom; United Kingdom; Nora Callebout; Ivy Lowman; Mary Lines; Hornovsky | | Team FFFGS; France; France; Geneviève Laloz; Alice Gonnet; Paulette de Croze; Alice Beuns | | Team FSFSF; France; France; Cécile Maugars; Germaine Darreau; Thérèse Brulé; Thérèse Renaut | |
| Hurdles | Daisy Wright; United Kingdom | 11,4 sec | Hilda Hatt; United Kingdom | | Alice Beuns; France | |
| High jump | Madeleine Bracquemond; France shared Gold | 1,37 m | Hilda Hatt; United Kingdom shared Gold | 1,37 m | shared Frédérique Kussel; France; Alice De Pauw; Belgium; Ivy Lowman; United Kingdom | 1,35 m |
| Long jump | Mary Lines; United Kingdom | 4,66 m | Elise van Truyen; Belgium | 4,52 m | Marie Jirásková; Czechoslovakia | 4,47 m |
| Javelin, two-handed^{[nb]} | Francesca Pianzola; Switzerland | 39,77 m | Florence Birchenough; United Kingdom | 38,71 m | Britte; France | 35,85 m |
| Shot put, two-handed^{[nb]} 3,628 kg | Violette Morris; France | 17,77 m | Miloslava Havlickova; Czechoslovakia | 14,95 m | Florence Hurren; United Kingdom | 14,81 m |
| Pentathlon | Ivy Lowman; United Kingdom | | Hilda Hatt; United Kingdom | | Geneviève Laloz; France | |

- ^{nb} Each athlete in the shot put and javelin throw events threw using their right hand, then their left. Their final mark was the total of the best mark with their right-handed throw and the best mark with their left-handed throw.

Daisy Wright and Hilda Hatt also competed in hurdles, previous winner in hurdles Germaine Delapierre participated in the high jump event.

The basketboll tournament was won by Team Haguenau after a win in the final against Team England with 9–8.

=== Aquatics ===
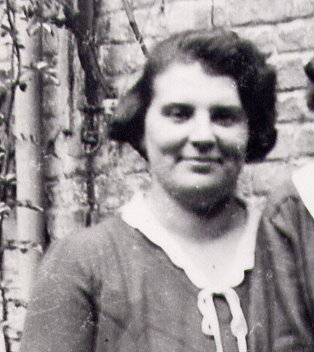
Germaine van Dievoet

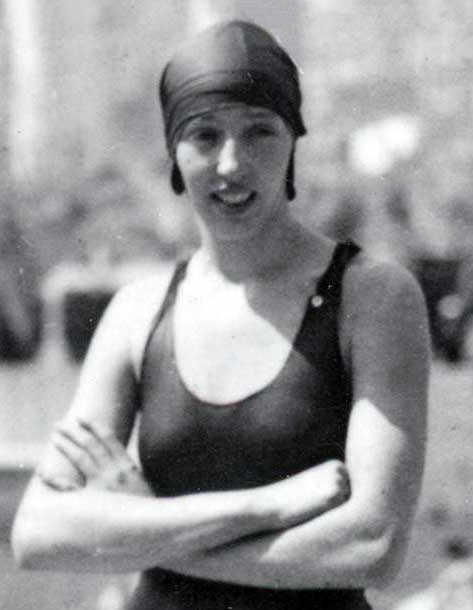
Aina Berg

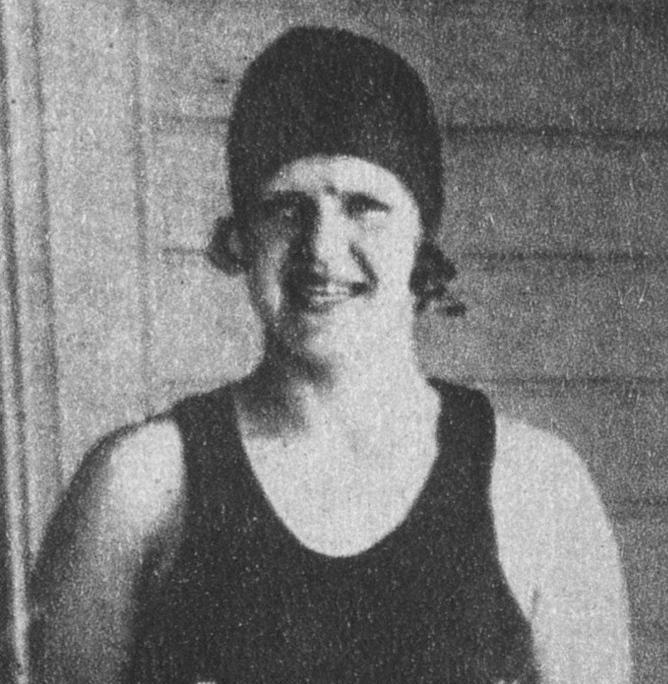
Carin Nilsson

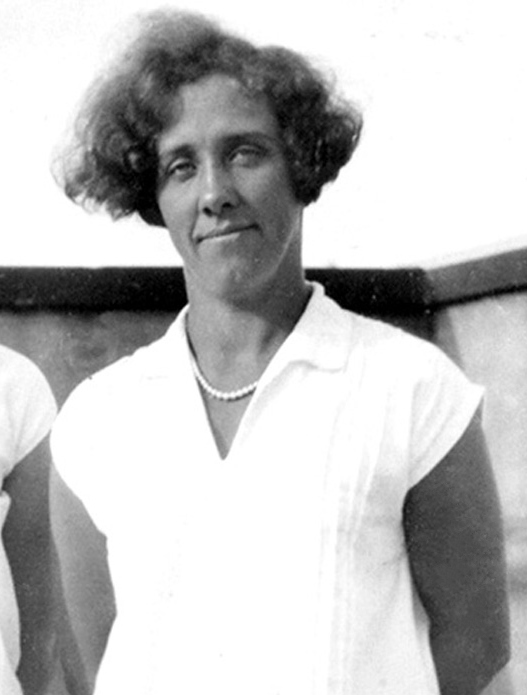
Hjördis Töpel

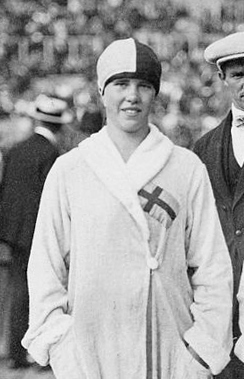
Eva Ollivier

The swimming events were held April 20–23, participants from Belgium, Denmark, France, Italy, Netherlands, Sweden and United Kingdom competed in 10 events. During the competitions Sweden secured 4 victories, the Netherlands 3 victories, France won 2 events and United Kingdom won 1 event.

| Event | Gold | Silver | Bronze |
|---|---|---|---|
| 100-metre freestyle, int | Aina Berg; Sweden | Carin Nilsson; Sweden | Germaine van Dievoet; Belgium |
| 100-metre freestyle, regional | Mariette Protin; France | Bienna Pélégry; France | A Veglio; France |
| 100-metre backstroke, int | Truus Klapwijk; Netherlands | D Hart; United Kingdom | Alice Harflinger; France |
| 200-metre breaststroke, int | D Hart; United Kingdom | Elisa van den Bogaert; Belgium | Hjördis Töpel; Sweden |
| 400-metre freestyle, int | Carin Nilsson; Sweden | Ernestine Lebrun; France | D Roux; United Kingdom |
| 4 x 50 m relay | France; Alice Harflinger; Alice Stoffel; Ernestine Lebrun; Mariette Protin | Netherlands; Truus Klapwijk; I Brandt; A Trejters; M Borsennez | Belgium; De Coniak; Elisa van den Bogaert; Germaine van Dievoet; J Weiters |
| 4 × 200 m relay | Sweden; Margit Bratt; Hjördis Töpel; Carin Nilsson; Aina Berg | Netherlands | United Kingdom |
| High diving springboard, 3 m | Truus Klapwijk; Netherlands | Eva Olliwier; Sweden | Henriette Delbort; France |
| High diving platform, 10 m | Eva Olliwier; Sweden | Hjördis Töpel; Sweden | Cecily O'Bryen; United Kingdom |

The water polo tournament was won by Team Netherlands after a win in the final against Team England with 6–0.

== Legacy ==
A special commemorative medal was issued for the participants.

Later in 1922 the first Women's World Games were held in Paris, the 1923 Women's Olympiad were held at the same Monaco venue. (Note: Women's teams from universities in the United Kingdom initiated women's inter-varsity competition in 1921 and the Inter-Varsity Athletics Board (IVAB) in England held its first inter-varsity track and field competition for women in 1922.)

The first women's national championships in track and field were held after the inaugural 1922 Women's World Games and the 1921, 1922 and 1923 Women's Olympiads. In the United Kingdom, the Women's Amateur Athletic Association was founded in 1922 and held the first WAAA Championships the following year. In the United States, the 1923 USA Outdoor Track and Field Championships included a women's competition for the first time.
