= Delapierre =

Delapierre is a French surname. Notable people with the surname include:

- François Delapierre (1970–2015), a French politician.
- Nicolas Benjamin Delapierre (1739–1802), a French artist.
- Germaine Delapierre, a French athlete.
- Robert Delapierre (1891–1970), a Belgian philatelist.
