= Alice De Pauw =

Personal information
- Nationality: Belgian

Sport
- Sport: Track and field athletics
- Events: high jump, javelin throw, shot put, discus throw
- Club: S.C. Anderlecht

Alice De Pauw was a Belgian pioneer in track and field athletics, being active during the early 1920s. She was specialized in the field events.

De Pauw was a member of S.C. Anderlecht and represented Belgium at international competitions.

== Athletics career ==
The first events for women's at the Belgian Athletics Championships were held in July 1921. Five event for women were held and two of them were won by De Pauw. She won the high jump event in a new Belgian record with 1.335 metres ahead of Maes and Van Daele. She won the shot put event with 7.48 metres, ahead of Levaque and Berdemont.

She was a member of the earliest Belgian national team, competing at the 1921 Belgium–France women's athletics match. Het best result was finishing second in the high jump behind French Alice Gonnet.

De Pauw represented Belgium at the 1922 Women's Olympiad where she won with a height of 1.35 metres the shared bronze medal together with French Frédérique Kussel and British Ivy Lowman. This was two centimetres too low for the gold medal won by French Madeleine Bracquemond and British Hilda Hatt.

Later in 1922 at the Belgian Athletics Championships she won five silver medals. In the high jump she finished behind Elise Van Truyen, while jumping the same score of 1.35 metres; in the shot put event with 13.65 metres she finished behind Georgette Vandyck and also finished behind her in the javelin throw event (24.68 metres). In the discus throw she finished with 19.42 metres behind Henriette Vandaelen who set a new Belgian record with 20.80 metres.

De Pauw represented Belgium at the 1922 Brussels international women's athletics competitions, the earliest women's international athletics competitions in Brussels. She won won the discus throw in a new Belgian record. She threw 26.33 metres and was much further compared to the former record of 20.80 metres. At these competitions she had a shared third place in the high jump with Belgian Elise Van Truyen. Their performance was also a new (shared) Belgian record with 1.35 metres, beating the old record with 0.01 meter. She finished fourth in the 4 kg shot put event.
