= Suzanne Liébrard =

French athletics competitor (1894–1932)

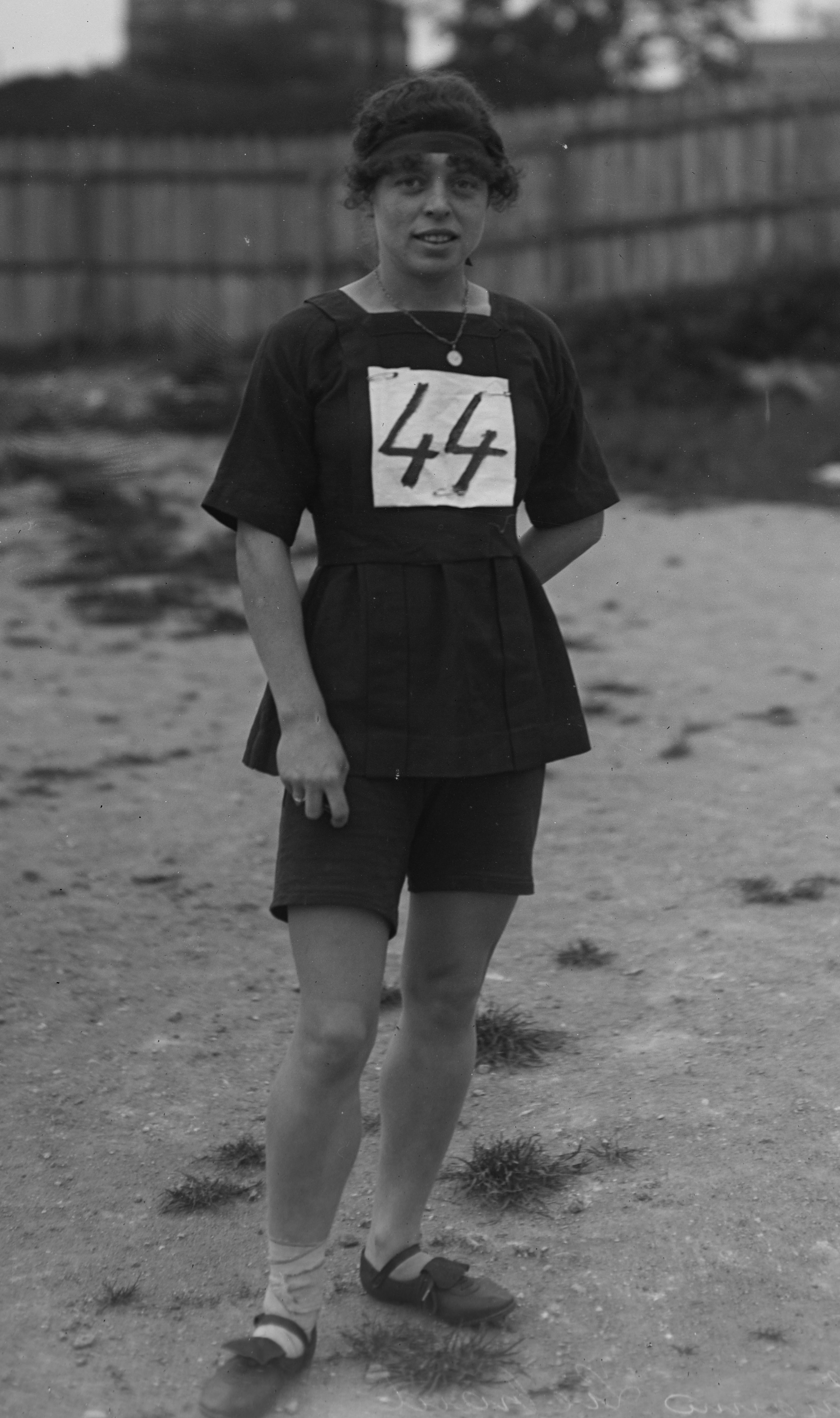
- Liébrard in 1920

Personal information
- Nationality: France
- Born: 5 April 1894
- Died: 26 March 1932 (aged 37)

Sport
- Event: Sprint
- Club: Femina Sport

Suzanne Liébrard (née Cuzin; 5 April 1894 - 26 March 1932) was a French athlete who was 13 times champion of France between 1917 and 1919. After setting the French record for the 100 yards hurdles in 1917 in 20 seconds, she ran 14.2 seconds two years later. She participated in the 1921 Women's Olympiad, the first international women's sports event.

== Historical ==
Liébrard, an accountant by trade, was with her sister Jeanne and the sisters, Jeanne and Thérèse Brulé, one of the founders on 27 July 1912 of the sporting club Femina Sport which included Mrs. Faivre Bouvot as the first president. During World War I, the group indicated their desire to break with the sexual codes of physical activities current then by competing in athletics. Their club, including Alice Milliat and Germaine Delapierre, a graduate in philosophy, became a bastion of feminine sport.

== Sports career ==
A versatile sportswoman, Lièbrard participated in July 1917 at the first women's events in the French Athletic Championships at the stadium of Brancion in Paris. In 1921 she participated at the 1921 Women's Olympiad in Monaco.

== Performances ==
On the occasion of the championships, she established the French records in four events:

- Long jump without momentum: 2.21 m
- Long jump with momentum: 4.15 m
- Javelin throwing: 15.84 m
- 100 yards hurdles: 20 s

She set her javelin record of 16.45 m on 9 September 1917, at Brancion stadium again. In 1918, she won five titles, adding the 80-meter dash in which she lowered the record of Therese Brulé by .2 sec to 10.20 sec. On these occasions she set new records in the two long jump events (2.36 m), (4.66 m) and she ran 14.8 sec for the 100-yard hurdles.
