= Thérèse Brulé =

French high jumper

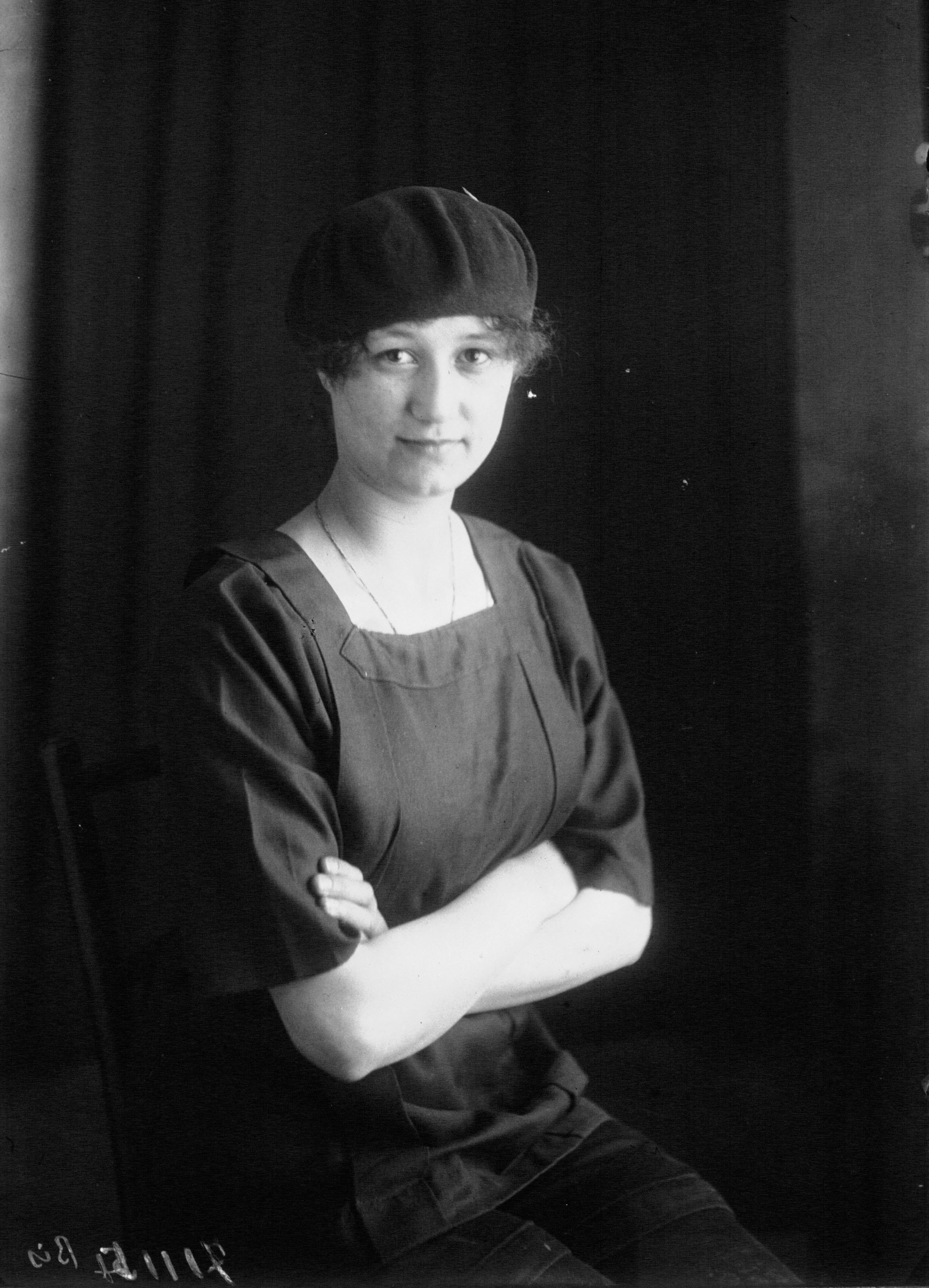
- Thérèse Brulé in 1919

Personal information
- Nationality: France
- Years active: 1912-1920

Sport
- Event: High Jump
- Club: Femina Sport

Thérèse Brulé was a French athlete who specialized in the high jump. Her sister Jeanne assumed the General Secretariat of the Fédération des sociétés féminines sportives de France (FSFSF) in 1920.

== Historical ==
Thérèse Brulé, typist by trade, was with her sister Jeanne and the other sisters Liébrard one of the founders, on 27 July 1912, of Femina Sport, which included Mrs. Faivre Bouvot as the first president. During the great War, they strove to improve gender codes of the day which confined the activities of women in rhythmic gymnastics and athletic sports. This club then established itself as the bastion of sportif feminism, of which Germaine Delapierre, graduate in philosophy, and Alice Milliat were the main organisers. At their instigation the office Fédération des sociétés féminines sportives de France(FSFSF) became exclusively female in 1920 and Therese's sister Jeanne becomes on the General Secretary.

== Sporting career ==
A versatile sportswoman, Therese Brule participated in July 1917 in the first female French Athletic Championships at the stadium of the porte Brancion in Paris. In 1921 she participated at the 1921 Women's Olympiad in Monaco and also in the runners-up 1922 Women's Olympiad and 1923 Women's Olympiad.

== Performances ==
On the occasion of the championships, she established French athletic records in 4 events:

- Standing high jump: 0,96 m,
- Running High jump: 1.25 m (tied with Mlle Mireux d'En Avant)
- 80 meters flat: 12.4 s
- 400 meters flat : 1 min 16.2 s
- In 1920 she again won the high jump with a leap of 1.33 m.
- With her sister Jeanne, she also took part in the world record of the 10 × 100 m replay, in the time of 2 min 23.2 s in 1921.
