= 1921 Women's Olympiad =

First international women's sports event

1921 Women's Olympia
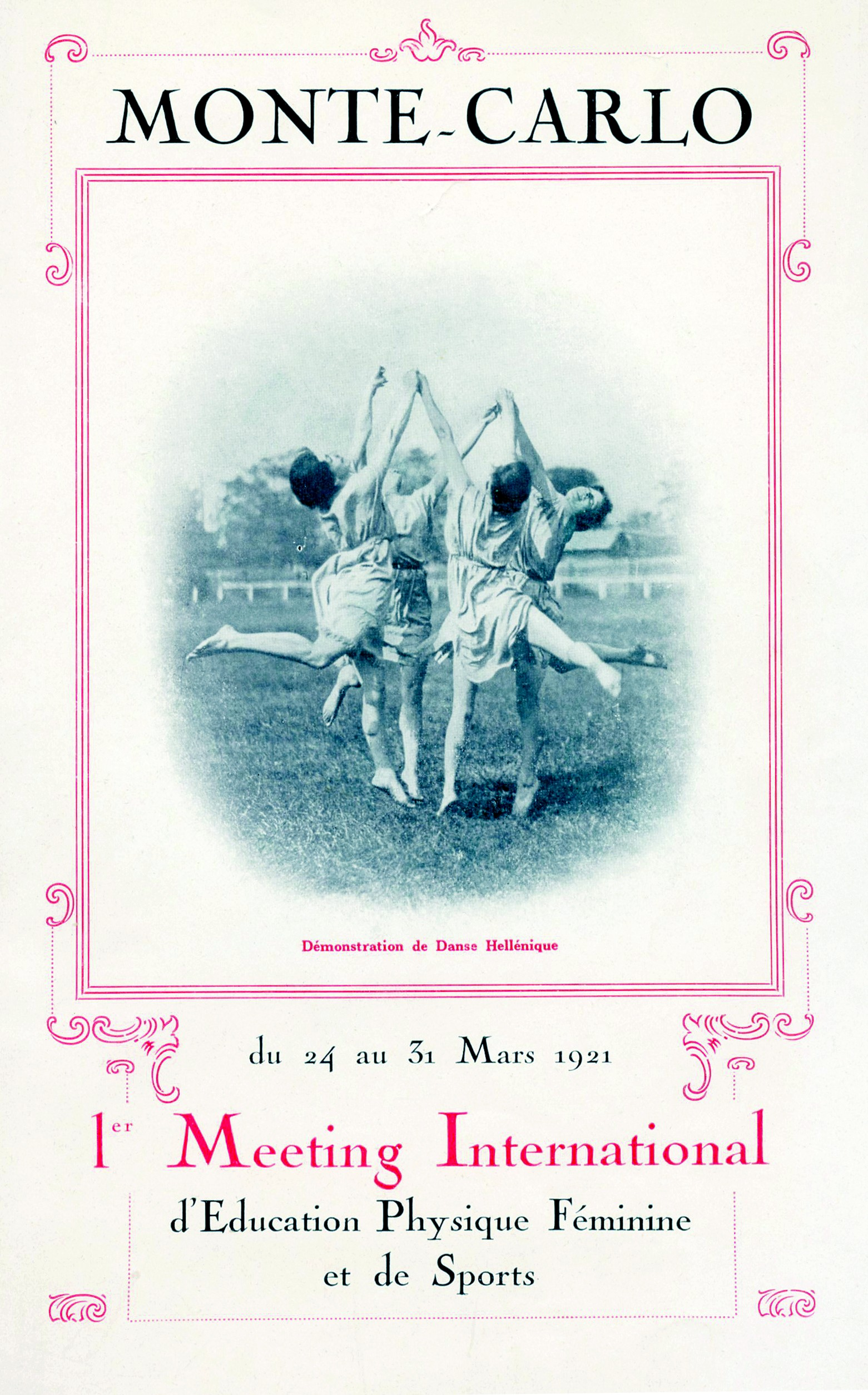
- Country: Monaco
- Dates: 24–31 March 1921

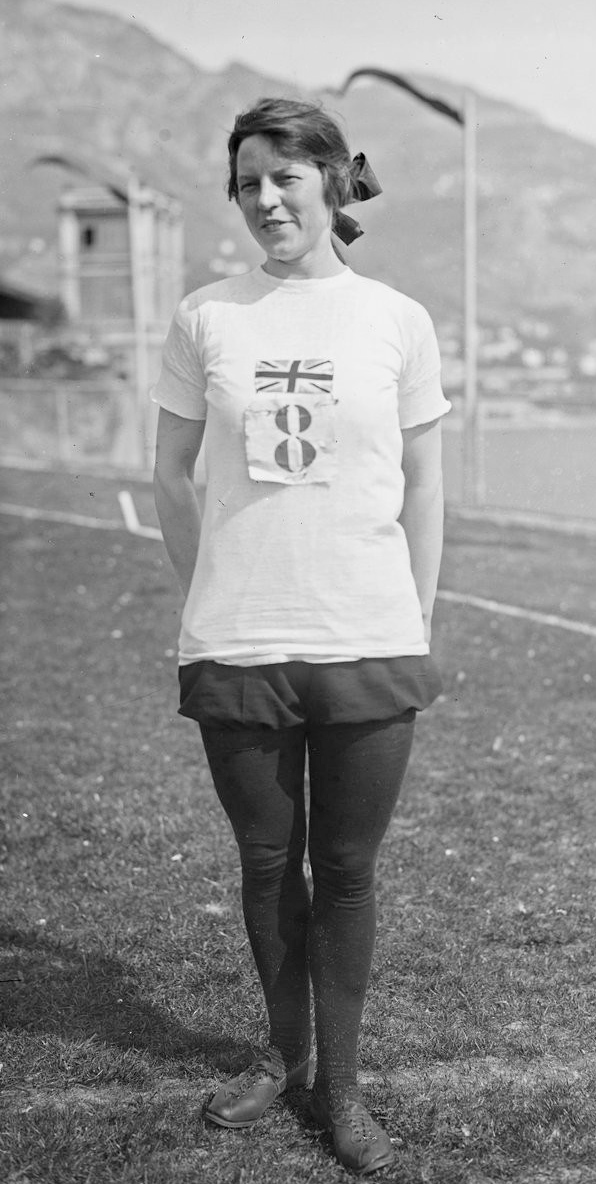
Mary Lines

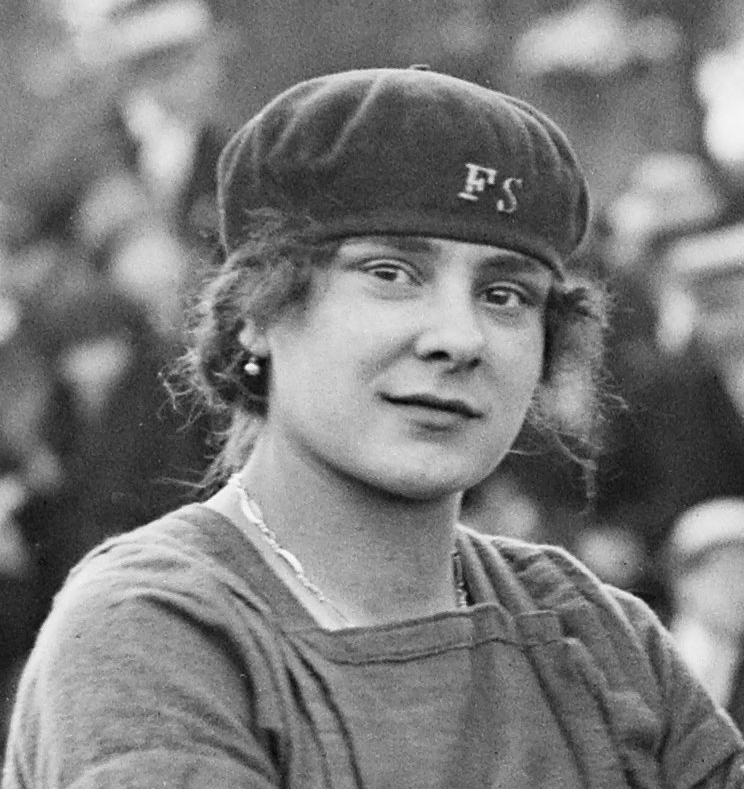
Lucie Bréard

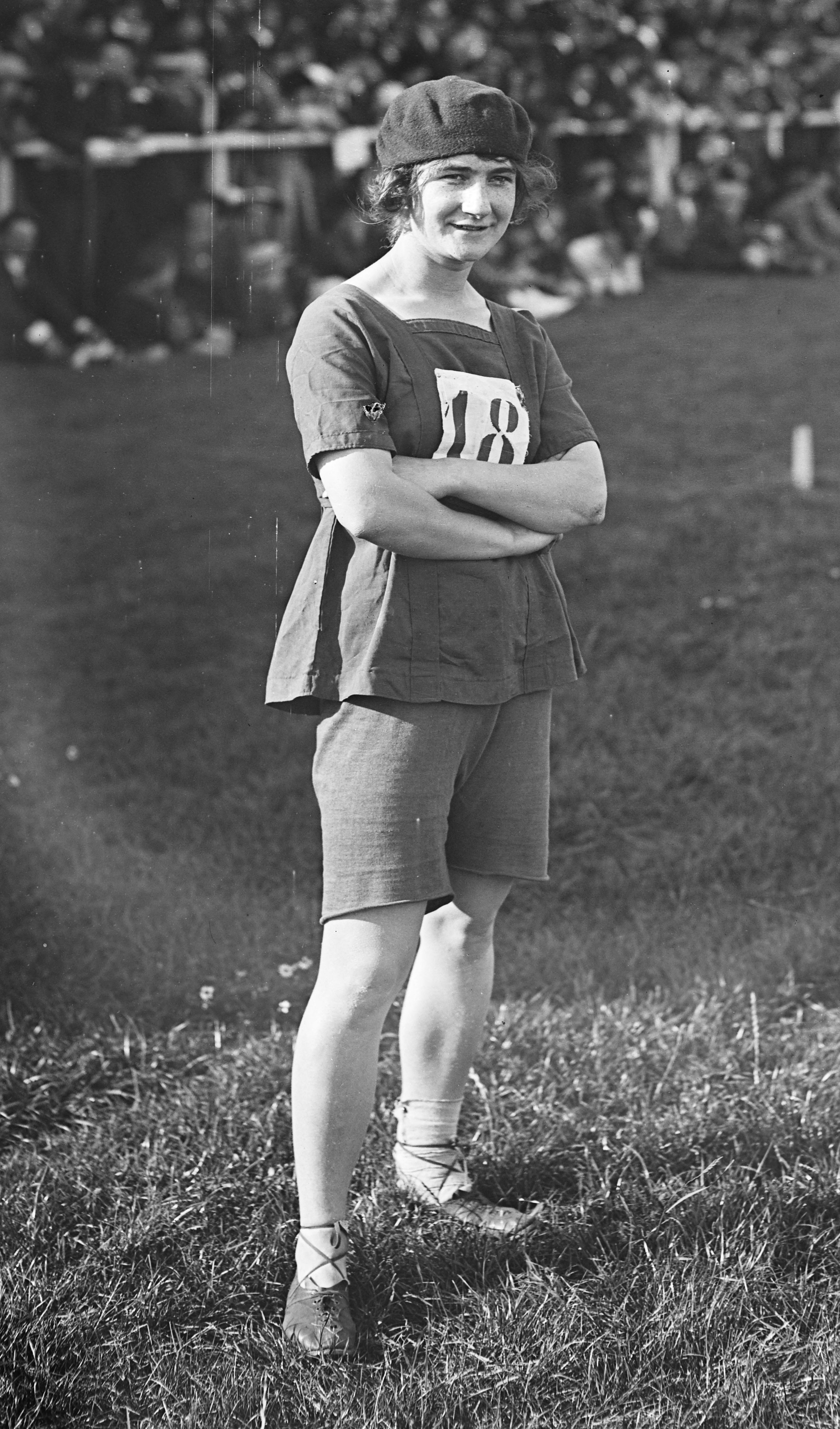
Germaine Delapierre

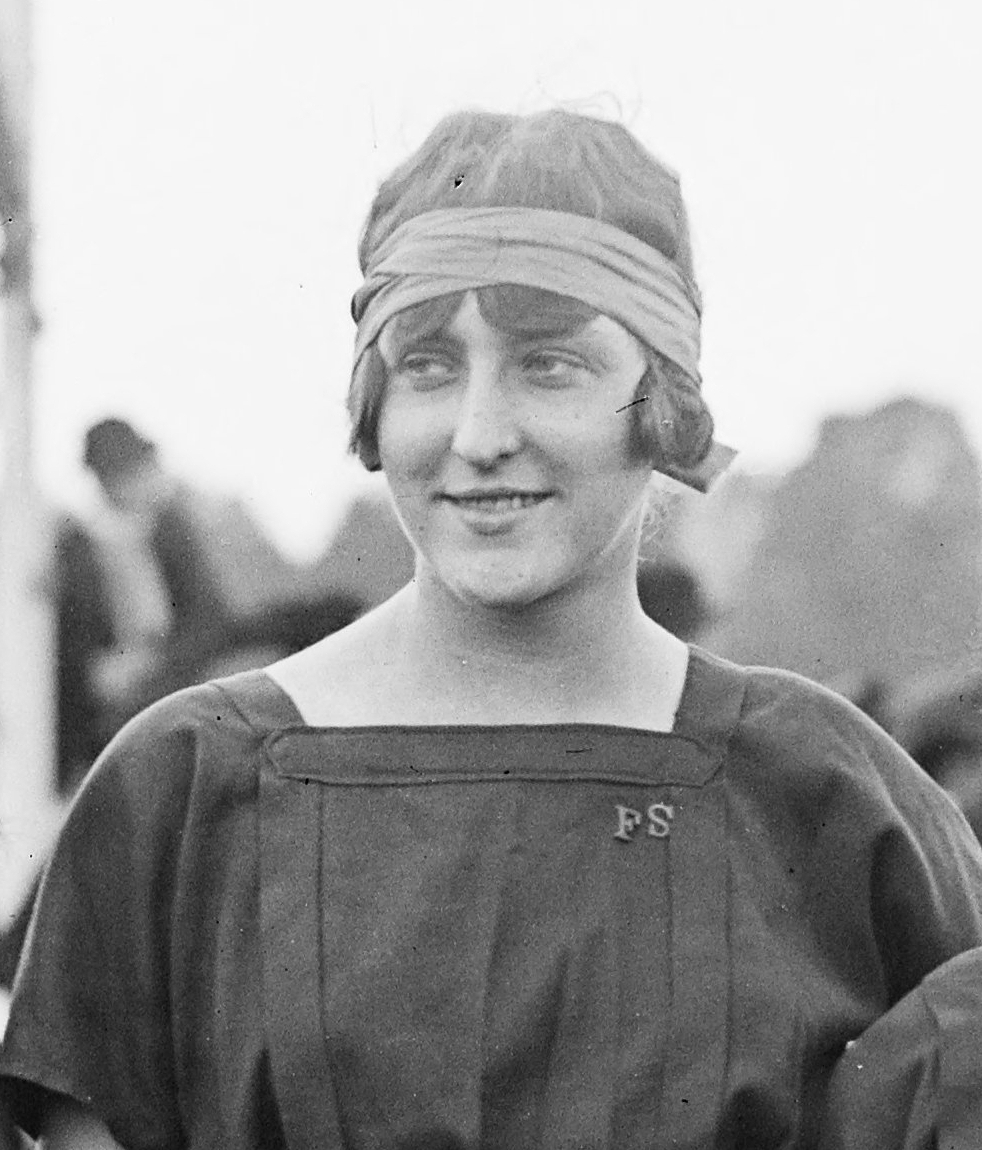
Frédérique Kussel

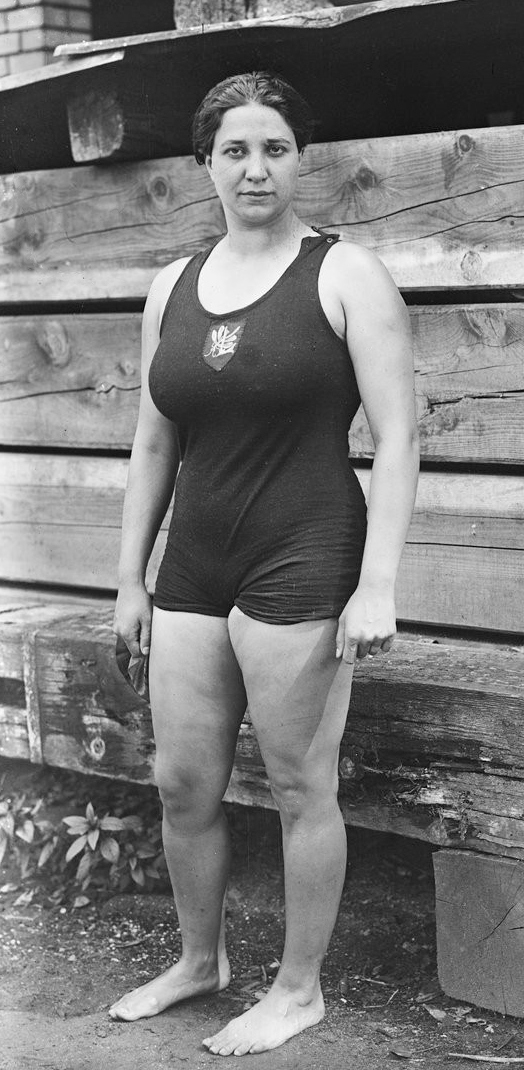
Violette Morris

The 1921 Women's Olympiad Olympiades Féminines and Jeux Olympiques Féminins was the first international women's sports event, a 5-day multi-sport event organised by Alice Milliat and held on 24–31 March 1921 in Monte Carlo at the International Sporting Club of Monaco. The tournament was formally called 1er Meeting International d'Education Physique Féminine de Sports Athlétiques. It was the first of three Women's Olympiads or "Monte Carlo Games" held annually at the venue, and the forerunner of the quadrennial Women's World Games, organised in 1922–1934 by the International Women's Sports Federation founded by Milliat later in 1921.

== Events ==
The games were organized by Alice Milliat and Camille Blanc, director of the "International Sporting Club de Monaco" as a response to the IOC decision not to include women's events in the 1924 Olympic Games. The games were attended by 100 participants from 5 nations: France, Italy, Switzerland, United Kingdom and Norway (mentioned by several sources, however no Norwegian athletes appear in the result lists).

The English team was a collection of 21 athletes who attended the Woolwich and Regent Street Polytechnics in London. They set out on 21 March 1921. They were to compete in ten events and they won eight and came second in another.

The athletes competed in ten events: running (60 metres, 250 metres, 800 metres, 4 x 75 metres relay, 4 x 175 metres relay and hurdling 65 metres), high jump, long jump, standing long jump (exhibition only), javelin and shot put. The tournament also held exhibition events in basketball, gymnastics, pushball and rhythmic gymnastics. The tournament was held at the "Tir aux Pigeons" in the gardens of the Monte Carlo Casino.

Team	Nation	Participants
1	France	58
2	Italy	?
3	Norway	?
4	Switzerland	?
5	United Kingdom	21

== Results ==
All gold medals went to athletes from France and the United Kingdom. Medalists:

Event	Gold		Silver		Bronze	
60 m	Mary Lines; United Kingdom	8.2	Daisy Wright; United Kingdom	?	Hilda Hatt; United Kingdom	?
250 m	Mary Lines; United Kingdom	36.3	Lucie Bréard; France	?	Suzanne Liébrard; France	?
800 m	Lucie Bréard; France	2.30,1	Mary Lines; United Kingdom	2.32,8	Suzanne Porte; France	2.44,0
4 x 75 m relay	GB Team A United Kingdom; Hilda Hatt; Alice Cast; Daisy Wright; Mary Lines	?	Team Femina Sport; France	?	GB Team B United Kingdom	?
4 x 175 m relay 200 meters in the finals	Team Great Britain; United Kingdom; Mary Lines; Bradley; Hilda Hatt; Alice Cast	1.46,2	Team Femina Sport; France; Lucie Bréard; Germaine Delapierre; Thérèse Brulé; Suzanne Liébrard	?	Team FFFSA; France; Alice Connet; Raymonde Canolle; Antonine Mignon; Paulette de Croze	?
Hurdles	Germaine Delapierre; France	12,6	Suzanne Liébrard; France	12,8	Thérèse Brulé; France	13,8
High jump	Frédérique Küsel; France	1.40	Hilda Hatt; United Kingdom	shared Gold	Madeleine Bracquemond; France	1.35
Long jump	Mary Lines; United Kingdom	4.70	Hilda Hatt; United Kingdom	4.60	Lucie Bréard; France	4.52
Javelin, two-handed^{[nb]}	Violette Morris; France	41,53	Francesca Pianzola; Switzerland	40,17	Carmen Pomiès; France	33,83
Shot put, two-handed^{[nb]}	Violette Morris; France	16.29	Francesca Pianzola; Switzerland	14,01	Marguerite Barberat; Switzerland	13,98

The basketball tournament was won by Team Great Britain after a win in the final against Team France with 8–7. A special commemorative medal was issued for the participants.

- ^{nb} Each athlete in the shot put and javelin throw events threw using their right hand, then their left. Their final mark was the total of the best mark with their right-handed throw and the best mark with their left-handed throw.

== Legacy ==
The tournament was a great success and an important step for Women's sports. (Note: Women's teams from two universities in the United Kingdom initiated women's inter-varsity competition in 1921 and the Inter-Varsity Athletics Board (IVAB) in England held its first inter-varsity track and field competition for women in 1922.) The 1922 Women's Olympiad and 1923 Women's Olympiad were held at the same Monaco venue; the 1922 event is sometimes confused with the 1922 Women's World Games held in Paris. The IAAF unveiled a commemorative plaque at the site of the games in 2008.

The first women's national championships in track and field were held after the inaugural 1922 Women's World Games and the 1921, 1922 and 1923 Women's Olympiads. In the United Kingdom, the Women's Amateur Athletic Association was founded in 1922 and held the first WAAA Championships the following year. In the United States, the 1923 USA Outdoor Track and Field Championships included a women's competition for the first time.
