= Yvonne de Bray =

French actress (1889–1954)

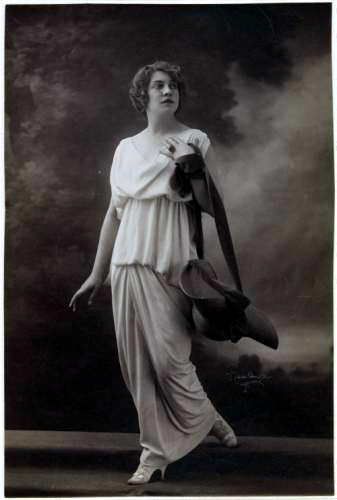
- portrait in 1913 by Léopold Reutlinger
- Born: Yvonne Laurence Blanche de Bray; 12 May 1889; Paris, France
- Died: 1 February 1954 (aged 64); Paris, France
- Years active: 1907–1953

Yvonne de Bray (12 May 1889 – 1 February 1954) was a French stage and film actress. She was born Yvonne Laurence Blanche de Bray in Paris and died there.

In 1939, she and her partner Violette Morris invited Jean Cocteau to stay with them at their houseboat docked at Pont de Neuilly where he wrote the three-act play Les Monstres sacrés. She was a successful stage actress but it was Cocteau who introduced her as a film actress in his 1943 film, The Eternal Return.

== Selected filmography ==
- The Eternal Return (1943)
- The Eagle with Two Heads (1948)
- Les Parents terribles (1948)
- Gigi (1949)
- Agnes of Nothing (1950)
- Chéri (1950)
- Olivia (1951)
- We Are All Murderers (1952)
