= Germaine Delapierre =

French athletics competitor

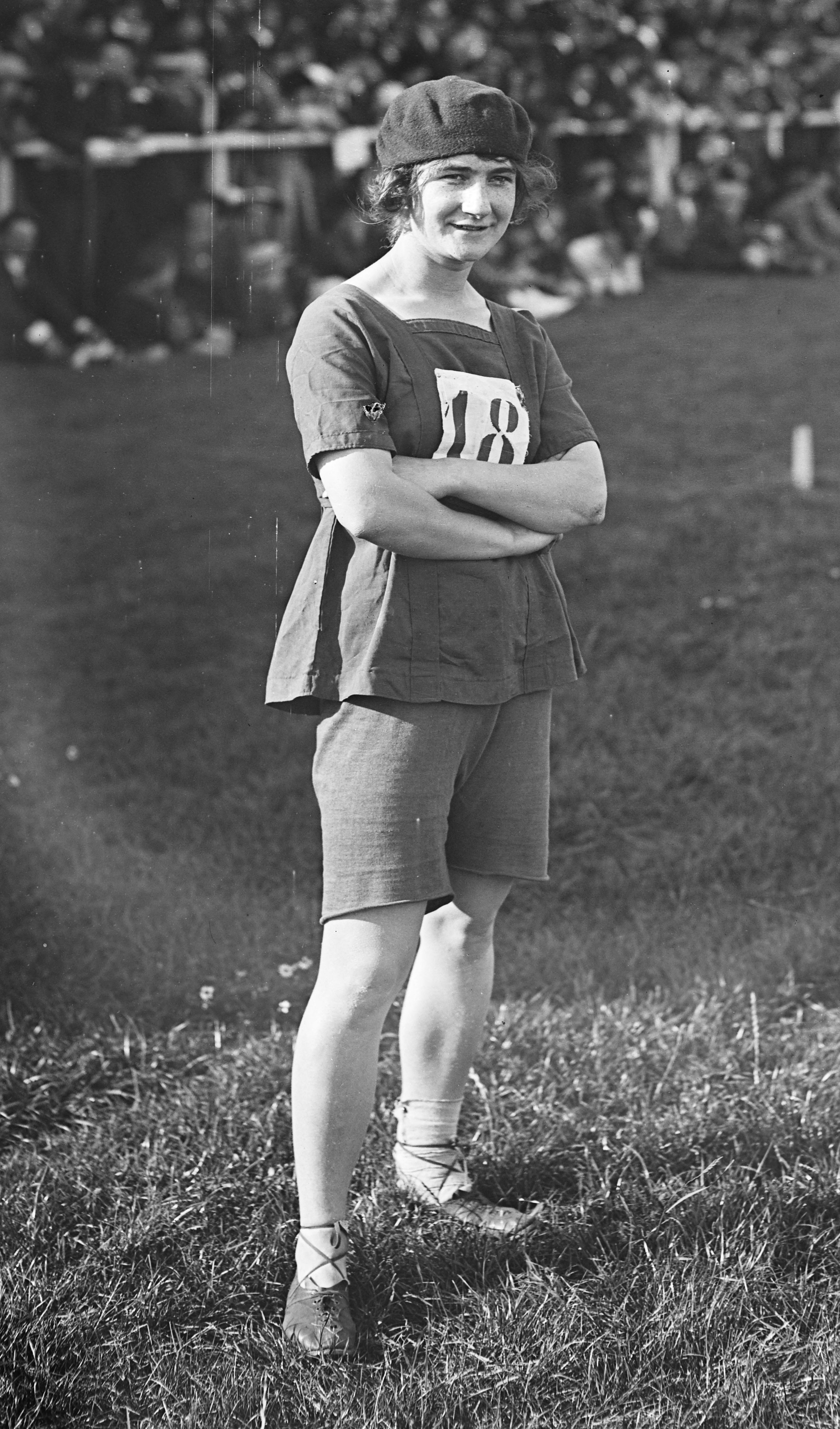
- Germaine Delapierre in 1920.

Personal information
- Nationality: French
- Years active: 1912-1921

Sport
- Event: hurdles
- Club: Femina Sport

Germaine Delapierre was a pioneering French athlete who specialized in the hurdles. She was also an active footballer.

== Historical ==
Germaine Delapierre, graduate in philosophy, was, with the sisters Brulé and Liébrard, one of the founders on 27 July 1912 of Femina Sport, while Faivre Bouvot was the first president. During the great War, these women indicated their desire to break with the prevailing sexual codes of physical activities by adopting the athletic sports. The club itself was a bastion of feminism in sports with Alice Milliat as one of the key militants.

== Sporting career ==
Germaine Delapierre was one of the first international athletes. In 1921 she participated in the 1921 Women's Olympiad winning the hurdles-event. In 1922 she participated in the 1922 Women's Olympiad without reaching a medal.

== Performances ==
Germaine Delapierre was:

- French champion in the 100 yard hurdles in 1919, 1920 and 1921
- 1st in the 100 yards hurdles in the 1st International female rally of 1921 at Monte-Carlo.
- She was also part of the relay team that set the world record in the 10 × 100 m, running 2:23.2 in 1921.
