= Germaine Beaumont =

French journalist and writer

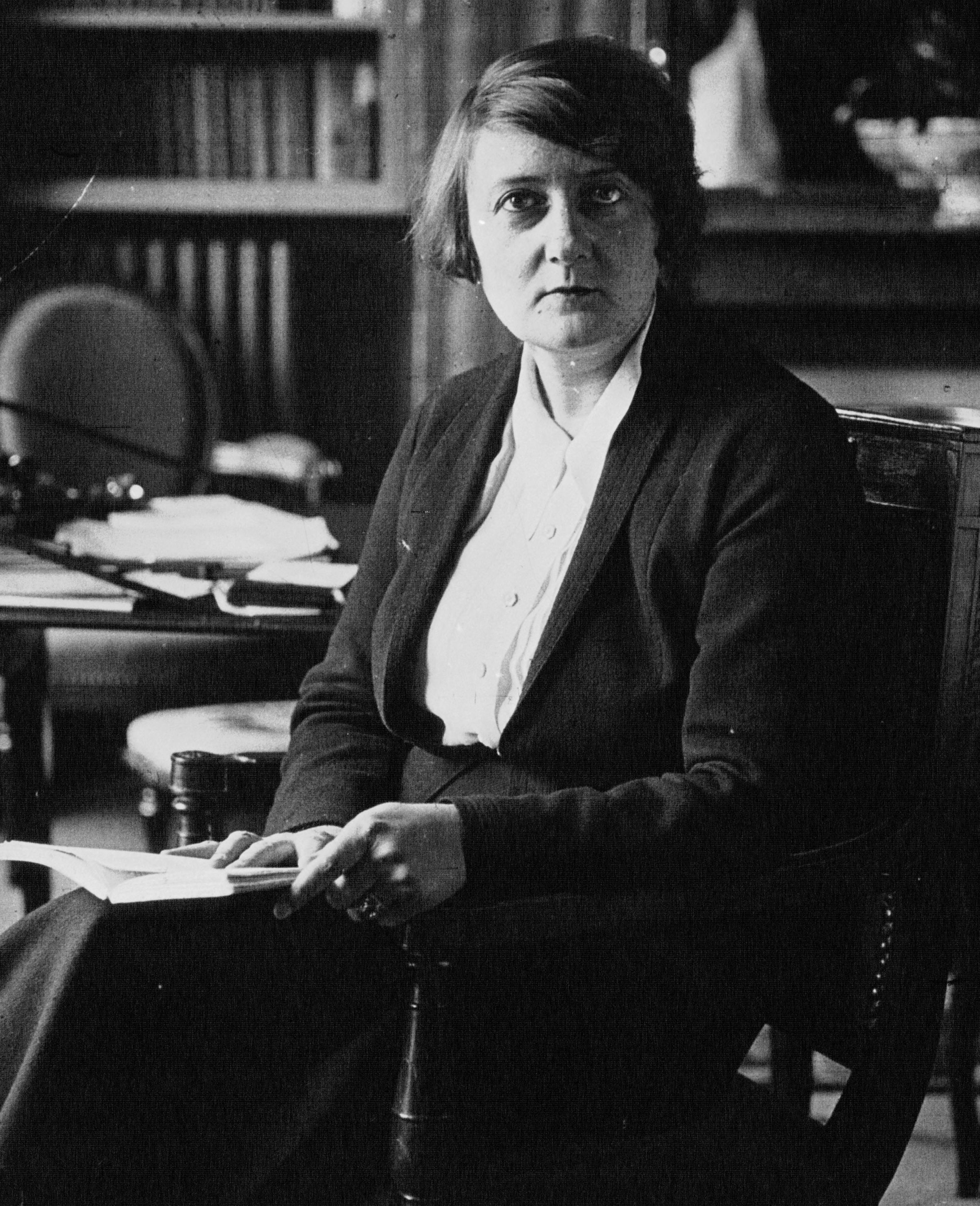
Germaine Beaumont

Germaine Beaumont (1890–1983) was a French journalist and writer. Her real name was Germaine Battendier. She was born in the Petit-Couronne and died in Montfort-l'Amaury at the age of 92. The author of more than a dozen books, she is best known for her 1930 book Piège which won the prix Renaudot.
