= Germaine Van Dievoet =

Belgian swimmer

Germaine van Dievoet
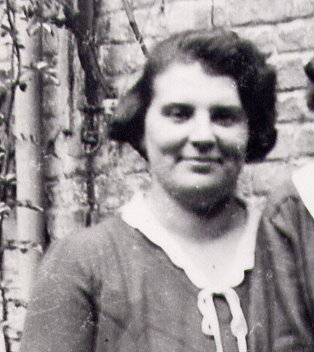
- Germaine van Dievoet
- Born: 26 September 1899; Brussels, Belgium
- Died: 30 October 1990 (aged 91); Uccle, Belgium
- Occupation: swimmer
- Family: Van Dievoet family

Germaine van Dievoet (/ˈdiːvʊt/, 26 September 1899 – 30 October 1990) was a Belgian competitive and Olympic swimmer.

== Career ==
Germaine Van Dievoet was the Belgian champion for the 100m women's freestyle in 1920, 1921, 1922 and 1923. She was one of only ten Belgian women to have participated in the 1920 Summer Olympics, which took place in Antwerp from 20 April until 12 September 1920. She competed in the 100 meter swim but lost in a semi-final race, finishing fourth. She was the only Belgian to compete in the race. Bronze medal, 100-meter freestyle at the 1922 Women's Olympiad.

On Thursday 27 October 1955, she received the bronze medal of the Belgian mérite sportif (sports merit).

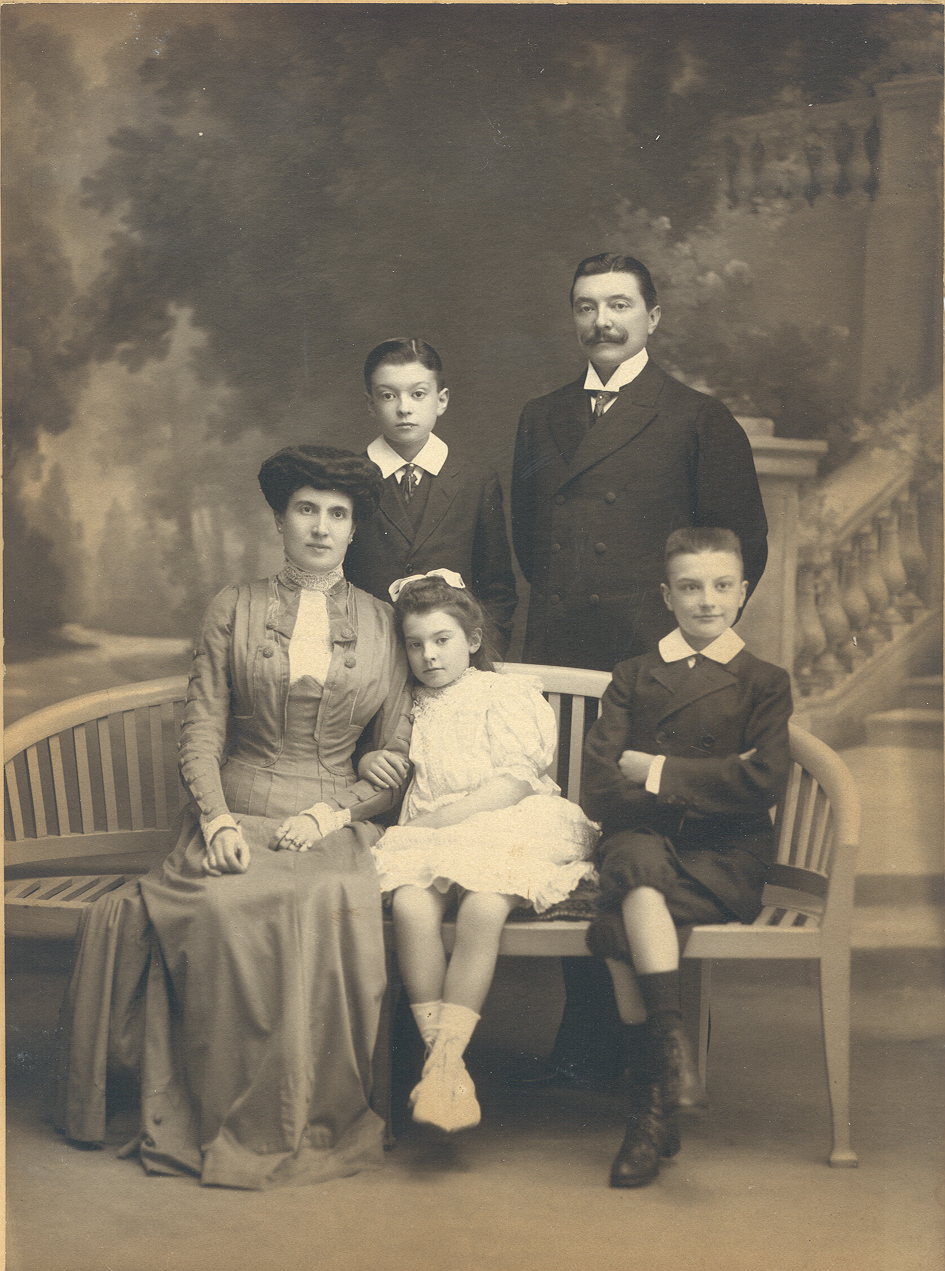
Germaine with her parents, architect Henri van Dievoet and Eugenie Masson, and her brothers.

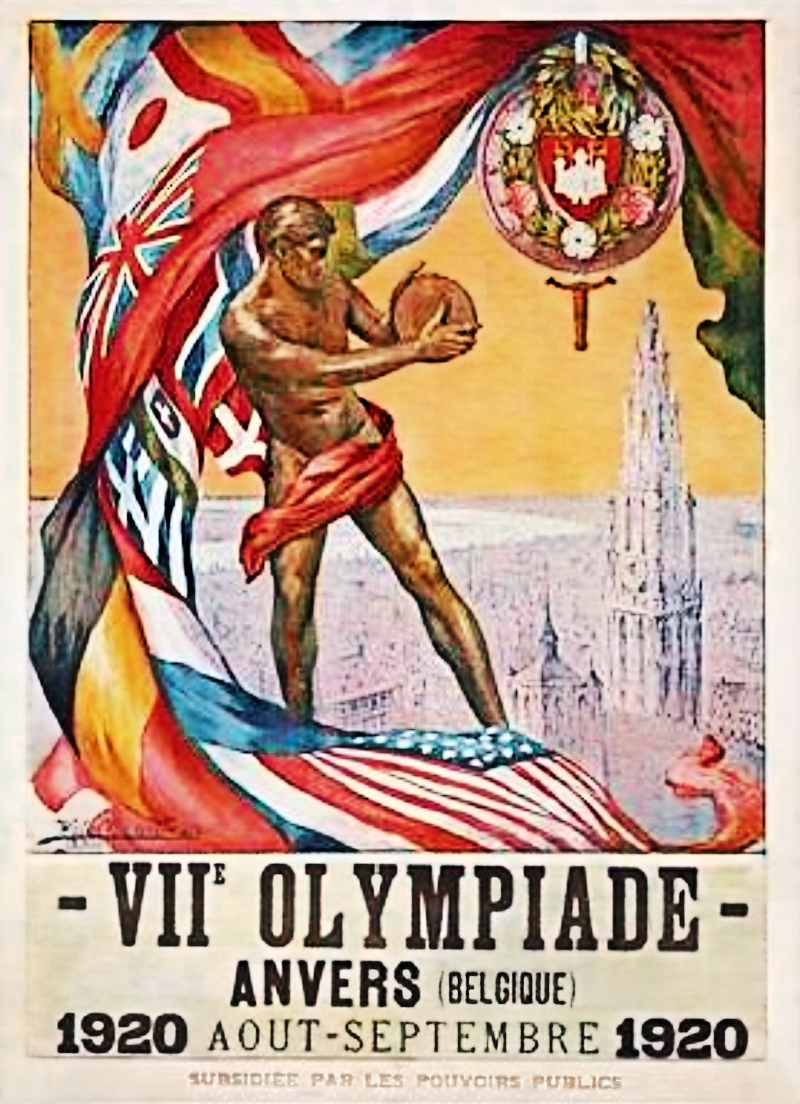
Germaine van Dievoet participated in the 1920 Antwerp Olympic Games

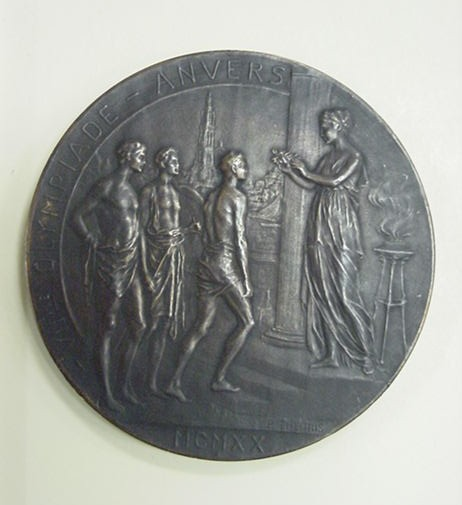
1920 Antwerp Olympic Games participation medal.

== Personal life ==
Van Dievoet was born in Brussels to architect Henri van Dievoet and Eugenie Masson. She married Willy Dessecker in Uccle on 23 August 1937. They did not have children.

== See also ==
- Swimming at the 1920 Summer Olympics – Women's 100 metre freestyle

== Bibliography ==
- Théo Mathy, Dictionnaire des sports et des sportifs belges, Brussels, éditions Paul Legrain, 1982.
