= Suzanne Kiffer-Porte =

French swimmer

Personal information
- Nationality: French
- Born: 21 March 1901 Paris, France
- Died: 14 January 1985 (aged 83) Paris, France

Sport
- Sport: Swimming

Suzanne Kiffer-Porte (21 March 1901 – 14 January 1985) was a French swimmer. She competed in the women's 200 metre breaststroke event at the 1924 Summer Olympics.

She was also an athlete who ran the 800 m in the 1921 Women's Olympiad and the 1922 Women's Olympiad.
