= Alice Cast =

British sprinter

Personal information
- Born: February 9, 1900
- Height: 1.71 m (5 ft 7 in)
- Weight: 62 kg (137 lb)

Sport
- Sport: Running
- Event(s): 100 meters, 200 meters

Alice Cast
Medal record

Women's Athletics

1921 Women's Olympiad
Gold medal – first place	1921 Women's Olympiad	4x75 metres relay
Gold medal – first place	1921 Women's Olympiad	4x175 metres relay

1922 Women's World Games
Silver medal – second place	1922 Women's World Games	300 metres

Alice Maud Cast (later Elsey, born February 9, 1900) was a British sprinter who was the inaugural holder of the women's 200m world record.

== Career ==
Cast achieved the inaugural women's world record for 200m on 20 August 1922 of 27.8 s.

Cast also won medals in the 1921 Women's Olympiad and the 1922 Women's World Games.

Cast personally or as a member of a team broke the following world records:

- 27 4/5s, 28.0s and 35.8s for 200m/220y/250 m in a 300m race in Paris on 20 August 1922.
- 51 4/5s for 4x100m/4x110y in Paris on 30 October 1921.
- 1:56 4/5 minutes for 4x200m/220y in London on 16 July 1921.
- 1:53.0 minutes for 4x200m/220y in Paris on 30 October 1921.
- 1:50 4/5 minutes for 4x200m/220y in London on 10 June 1922.

Note: only the first and fourth items on the list were officially ratified by the IAAF.

In addition, Cast was third twice at the WAAA Championships (widely regarded as the de facto British national championships) at 440 yards in 1922 and 1924.
