= Violette Morris =

French athlete (1893–1944)

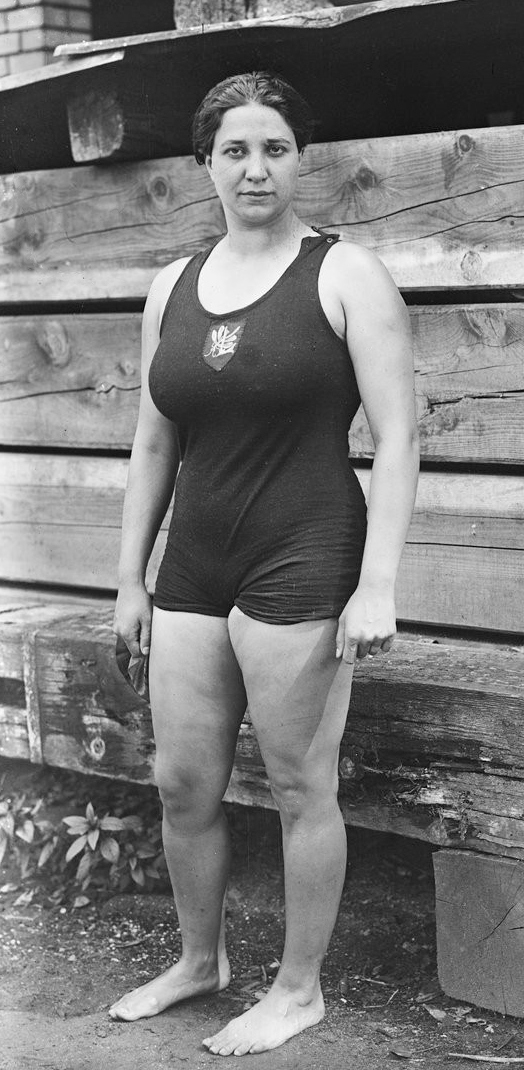
- Morris in 1920

Personal information
- Born: 18 April 1893 Paris, French Third Republic
- Died: 26 April 1944 (aged 51) near Épaignes, Normandy, Nazi-occupied France
- Height: 166 cm (5 ft 5 in)
- Weight: 68 kg (150 lb)

Sport
- Sport: Athletics
- Events: Shot put, javelin throw, auto racing
Medal record
Representing France
Women's World Games
Gold medal – first place	1921 Monte Carlo	Javelin throw
Gold medal – first place	1921 Monte Carlo	Shot put
Gold medal – first place	1922 Monte Carlo	Shot put
Silver medal – second place	1922 Monte Carlo	Javelin throw
Silver medal – second place	1922 Paris	Shot put

Violette Morris (18 April 1893 – 26 April 1944) was a French athlete and Nazi collaborator who won two gold medals and one silver medal at the Women's World Games in 1921–1922. She was later banned from competing for violating "moral standards". She was invited to the 1936 Summer Olympics by Adolf Hitler and was an honored guest. During World War II, she collaborated with Nazis and the Vichy France regime. She became known as the "Hyena of the Gestapo" and was killed by the French Resistance.

== Early life ==
Violette Morris was born in Paris to Baron Pierre Jacques Morris, a retired French Army cavalry captain, and Élisabeth Marie Antoinette Sakakini, of Palestinian Arab origin. Morris spent her adolescence in a convent, L'Assomption de Huy. She married Cyprien Édouard Joseph Gouraud on 22 August 1914 in the 8th arrondissement of Paris. They divorced in May 1923. Morris learned how to drive during World War I and during the war she drove ambulances and worked as a courier including at the Battle of the Somme and the Battle of Verdun.

== Athletic career ==
Morris played football for Fémina Sports from 1917 until 1919, and for Olympique de Paris from 1920 to 1926. She also played on the France women's national team. She won gold medals at the 1921 and 1922 Women's Olympiads.

In addition to her football career, she was an active participant in many other sports. She was selected for the French national water polo team even though there was no women's team at the time. She was an avid boxer, often fighting against, and defeating, men. Among the other sports she participated in were road bicycle racing, motorcycle racing, car racing, airplane racing, horseback riding, tennis, archery, diving, swimming, weightlifting, and Greco-Roman wrestling. Her most successful years were considered to be from 1921 to 1924, during her slogan was "Ce qu'un homme fait, Violette peut le faire!" (English: "What a man does, Violette can do!"). At the 1924 Women's Olympiad she won gold medals in discus and shot put.

=== Motor racing ===
Morris had her breasts removed by a mastectomy, which she claimed was in order to fit into racing cars more easily. She mainly competed in cyclecar endurance races and used a Benjamin cyclecar. She competed in the Tour de France Automobile in 1923; Bol d'Or 1922, 1923, 1926-8; Paris~Pyrenees 1922, 1923; Paris~Nice 1923, 1927; GP San Sebastian 1926; Dolomites 1934. She won the 1927 Bol d'Or 24-hour car race at the wheel of a B.N.C.

== Lifestyle ==
Morris's lifestyle in the 1920s was quite different from the traditional role of women. In addition to her wide-ranging athletic activities, Morris was outside traditional behaviours of the time in several other ways. She was homosexual, dressed in men's attire, was a heavy smoker and swore often.

In 1928, the Fédération Féminine Sportive de France (FFSF) (French Women's Sports Federation) refused to renew her licence amid complaints about her lifestyle and she was barred from participating in the 1928 Summer Olympics on moral grounds, in particular, her penchant for wearing men's clothing. She had also punched a football referee and had been accused of giving amphetamines to other players.

After 1928, her auto racing license was revoked on similar moral grounds and Morris started a car-parts store in Paris. Along with her employees, she built racing cars. The business went bankrupt.

In 1930, Morris unsuccessfully sued the FFSF, claiming damages, as she could no longer earn wages competing as an athlete. During the trial, an obscure ordinance from 1800 forbidding women to wear trousers was used against her. Historian Marie-Jo Bonnet claimed that although Morris's homosexuality was not directly targeted in the trial, it was made an issue throughout. One of the lawyers representing the FFSF was Yvonne Netter, a noted campaigner for French women's rights.

A quote attributed to Morris after the trial was censored:

We live in a country made rotten by money and scandals, ruled by speechifiers, schemers and cowards. This country of little people is not worthy of its elders, not worthy of survival. Someday its decay will bring it to the level of a slave, but if I'm still here, I won't be one of the slaves. Believe me, it’s not in my temperament.

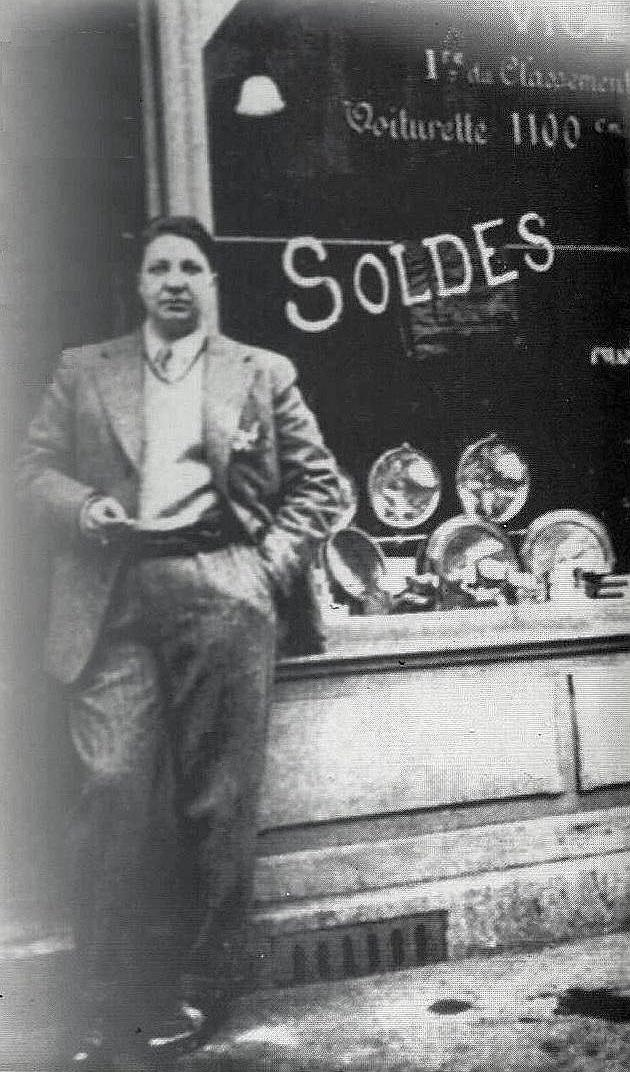
Morris in front of her Paris automotive store, 1928

During her athletic career in the 1920s, Morris became friends and associates with many of France's artists and intellectuals. She had longstanding friendships with American-born entertainer Josephine Baker, actor Jean Marais, and poet, author, and filmmaker Jean Cocteau. In 1939, Morris and her partner, actress Yvonne de Bray, invited Cocteau to stay with them at their houseboat docked at Pont de Neuilly. There he wrote the three-act play Les Monstres sacrés.

== Arrest and acquittal for homicide ==
In January 1933, Morris moved into a houseboat, La Mouette, with her partner, Yvonne de Bray, which was moored on the Seine at Pont de Neuilly in northwest Paris near the Bois de Boulogne. Living off inheritance annuities, she took up lyrical singing and was successful enough in the hobby to be broadcast performing on the wireless.

On Christmas Eve 1937, while having dinner with friends and neighbors Robert and Simone de Trobriand at a restaurant in Neuilly, the trio encountered a drunk and aggressive young man named Joseph Le Cam. The unemployed ex-Legionnaire became embroiled in a heated argument with Simone de Trobriand. Morris was able to calm the man after some time. The following evening, after more drinking in Montmartre, Le Cam arrived at Morris' houseboat and another argument took place, this time between Morris and Le Cam. Le Cam left the houseboat, but soon returned after seeing Simone de Trobriand boarding La Mouette. They had argued the night before and Le Cam rushed back to the houseboat, brandishing a knife, and threatened both Morris and de Trobriand. Morris pushed Le Cam several times before he lunged at her and she produced a 7.65mm revolver. Morris fired four shots, the first two into the air, the following two at Le Cam. He later died in hospital. Morris was arrested and charged with homicide and incarcerated for four days at the La Petite Roquette prison in the 11th arrondissement of Paris. She was tried in the cour d'assises in March 1938, but was acquitted when the court accepted her plea of self-defense.

== Nazi collaboration and assassination ==
Morris was invited to attend the 1936 Summer Olympics by Adolf Hitler. Historian Anne Sebba has said that Morris was an honored guest.

During World War II and the German occupation of France, Morris served as a collaborator for the Nazis and Vichy France. The nature of her collaboration is disputed. Some, such as writer Raymond Ruffin, claim that one of her main responsibilities during the war was to foil the operation of the Special Operations Executive, a British-run organisation that helped the Resistance. He also suggested that, in addition to being a spy for the Nazis, she would have been involved in the torture of suspects during interrogation.

Although Morris sourced black-market petrol for the Nazis, ran a garage for the Luftwaffe, and drove for the Nazi and Vichy hierarchy, others say that this appears to be the limit of her collaboration. In any case, they note that she had conducted these activities before the fall of France and no evidence exists to support Ruffin's claim that she was involved either in spying or torturing. They suggest that she was perhaps a suitable scapegoat, especially considering her controversial comments before the war. Whether or not it is accurate, her reputation for involvement in torture and enjoying it resulted in her becoming known popularly as the "hyena of the Gestapo".

On 26 April 1944, while driving in her Citroën Traction Avant on a country road from Lieurey to Épaignes in Normandy with the Bailleul family, who were favourably positioned with the Nazi regime in France, Morris's car sputtered and came to a halt. Earlier in the day, the engine had been tampered with by maquisards of the French Resistance Maquis Surcouf group. Resistance members emerged from a hiding spot and opened fire on the car. The three adults and two children in the car were killed. Ruffin claimed that Morris was the target, but Bonnet states this is not clear, given the influence of the Bailleul family with the Nazis. Morris's body, riddled with bullets, was taken to a morgue, where it remained unclaimed for months. She was buried in an unmarked communal grave.

== In popular culture ==
Francine Prose based her character of collaborationist athlete Lou Villars on Morris in her 2014 novel Lovers at the Chameleon Club, Paris 1932. Morris is the title character in Gérard de Cortanze's Femme qui court, which won the 2019 Prix Historia for best historical novel.

== Sources ==
- Jean-Emile Neaumet, Violette Morris, la Gestapiste, éd. Fleuve Noir, coll. « Crime Story », 1994
- Jacques Delarue, Histoire de la Gestapo, éd. Fayard, 1996
- Christian Gury, L'Honneur ratatiné d'une athlète lesbienne en 1930, éd. Kimé, 1999 ISBN 2841741699
- Raymond Ruffin, Violette Morris, la hyène de la Gestapo, éd. Le Cherche Midi, 2004 ISBN 2749102243
- Bonnet, Marie-Josèphe (2011), Violette Morris, histoire d'une scandaleuse, éd. Perrin, ISBN 978-2-262-03557-0, archived from the original on 13 September 2021
- Miroir du Sport, 14 April 1921
- Miroir des Sports, n° 260, 3 June 1925
- Morris is the subject of Francine Prose's historical novel Lovers at the Chameleon Club, Paris 1932 (Harper, 2014): hear Prose interviewed here. Morris' character is called Lou Villars.
