= Yvonne Netter =

French advocate and journalist

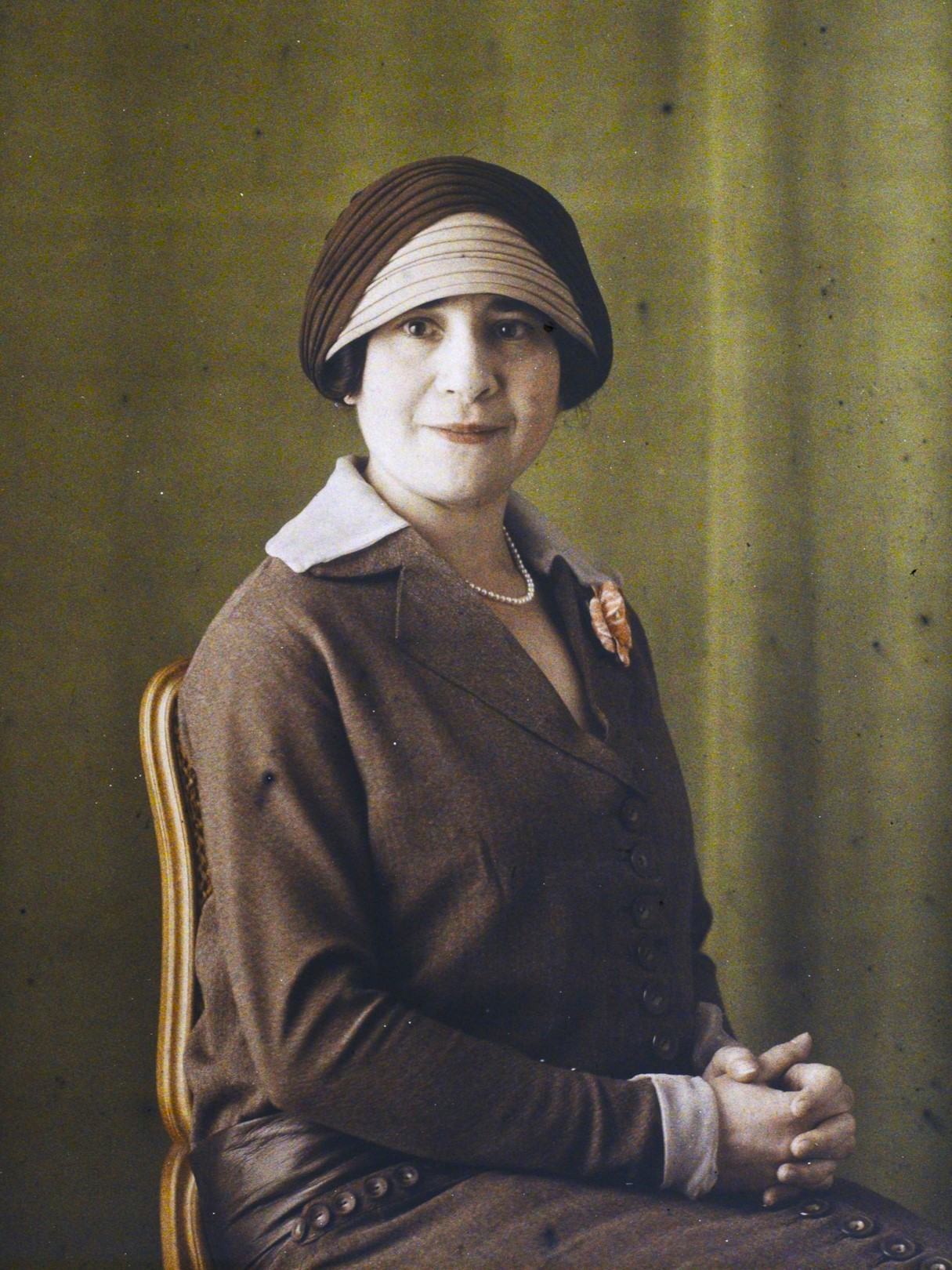
Autochrome portrait by Georges Chevalier, 1925

Yvonne Netter (8 April 1889 – 30 August 1985) was a French advocate, journalist, campaigner for feminism and Zionism and an active member of the French Resistance during the Vichy France period. She was arrested and interned in three French-run camps before being helped to escape.

== Biography ==
=== Early to interwar years ===
Netter was born to Blanche Isaac and Mathieu Netter, an industrialist from the Alsace region of France whose business was processing bird down. Her mother died when she was 14. After gaining her higher certificate at school she followed secondary school studies for girls at the Sorbonne. She married Pierre Isaac Gompel in 1911 and the following year gave birth to her son, Didier Gompel-Netter. Her husband had poor health and was not sent to the front to fight in World War I; he was employed as a driver before being demobilised because of illness between 1915 and 1916. Netter worked as a military nurse until 1917, assigned to fr:l'Hôpital Militaire Complémentaire de Meaux. In 1918, her husband left the family home. She divorced him the following year and, with her father's support, returned to studies, becoming an advocate in 1920.

In 1923, Netter co-founded the Jewish Women's Union for Palestine with Suzanne Zadoc-Kahn, wife of doctor and chair of the Central Committee of Keren Hayesod, Léon Zadoc-Kahn; the Union later became the French section of the Women's International Zionist Organization; she was also active in other women's Jewish groups. Between the late 1920s and the onset of World War II, she travelled widely in Europe and North Africa promoting Zionism at conferences. From the 1920s in particular, she fought passionately for the right of women to work and vote [only realised in France 27 years after other major European nations]. She was involved in feminist groups such as la Ligue française pour le droit des femmes (French League for Women's Rights), the Société pour l’amélioration du sort de la femme et la revendication de ses droits (Society for the improvement of the lot of women and the assertion of their rights), which she chaired in 1932 in 1934, and other women's associations such as L'Union Féminine des carrières libérales et commerciales (Union of women in liberal and commercial careers), the Soroptimist Club and L'Association française des femmes diplômées des universités (French association of women university graduates).

Netter and other French feminists linked their goals to wider anti-colonial ones pursued in the international milieu of Paris, for example, in political and satirical pieces on race and gender for La Française, a feminist journal, and La Dépêche Africaine [The African Dispatch]. Netter was known amongst black Parisians before La Dépêche Africaine was first published. French-speaking Africans were – like French women – also unable to vote, despite their families' sacrifices for France in the war.

In contrast to her feminist credentials, Netter was one of the advocates who successfully defended the Fédération Féminine Sportive de France against Violette Morris, a world-class French athlete, who was banned from competing or earning from her sports primarily because of her usual style of dress (wearing trousers). Netter was quoted as saying, "Women do not have the right to wear shorts in the street."

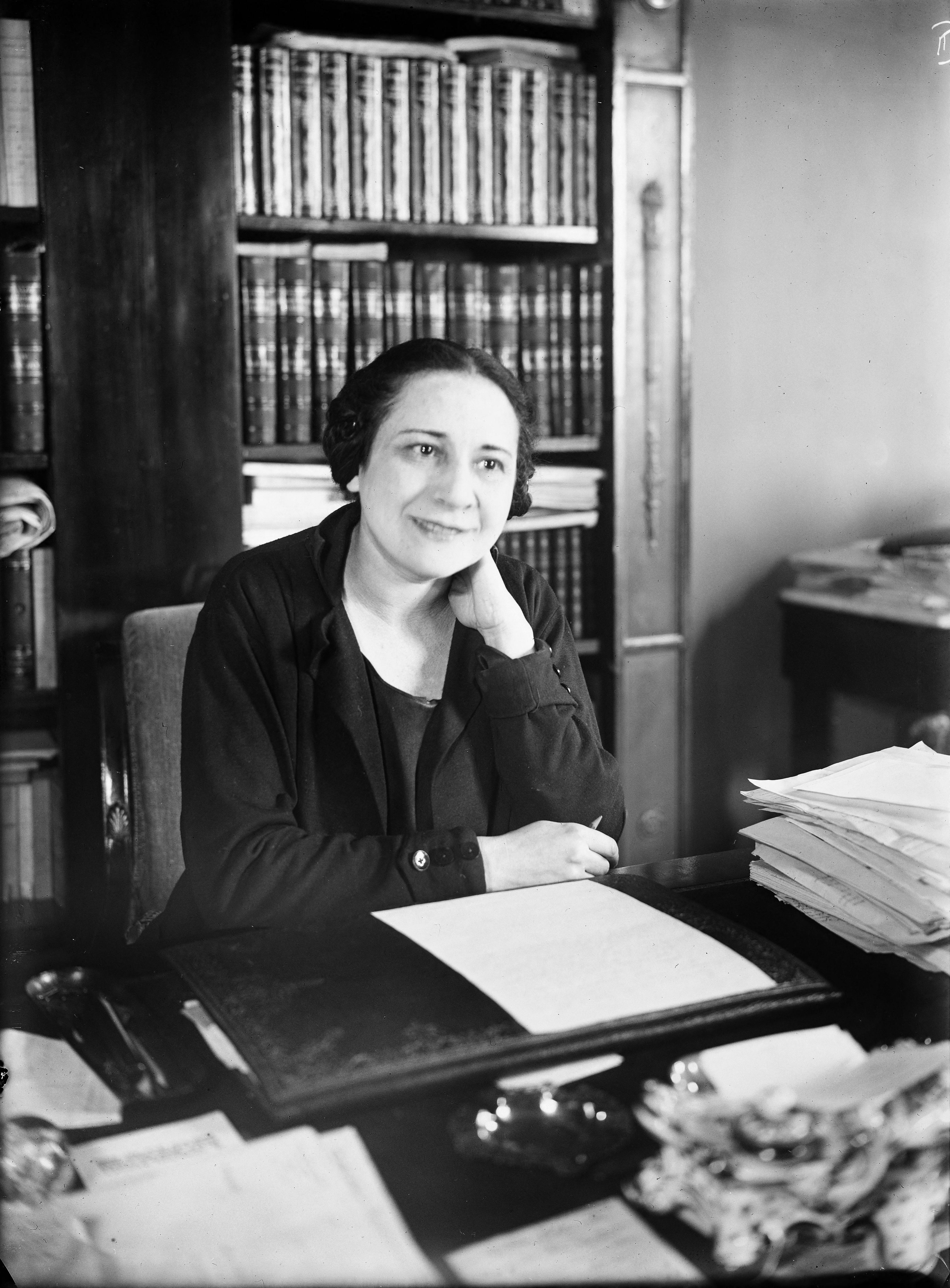
Yvonne Netter by Thérèse Bonney in the 1930s

=== World War II ===
In 1940, shortly after the defeat of France to the Nazis, Madeleine Fauconneau du Fresne – an activist for the Moral Re-Armament movement begun by Frank Buchman – was advised by a friend to engage the services of Netter after she was called to court to answer charges of defamation following an argument with a neighbour. The two became good friends and this led Netter to convert to Catholicism, but nonetheless she was banned from her profession in 1941 because of her Jewish background. For the same reason, she was arrested on 4 July 1942 by French police and a Gestapo agent and interned at fr:Caserne des Tourelles. On 13 August, she was transferred to Drancy and finally, on 1 September, to Pithiviers. While she was in the Pithiviers hospital, due to severe dysentery, Fauconneau du Fresne was able to visit and pass on details of an escape plan arranged with Line Piguet, the wife of Dr. Robert Piguet, and with the help of a laundry worker there. While attending mass, Netter wore a friend's jacket and escaped with Henri Tessier, a market gardener, to stay awhile with the Tessier family in Pithiviers before staying with Tessier's friend, Joseph-Marie Cardin. Cardin's daughter, Josèphe-Marie Cardin Massé took Netter to her parents' home where she remained hidden. The Cardins provided money and false documents for her planned trip to the southern zone where she could join her brother, Léo. Madame Piguet – who also helped Netter's son, Didier – was arrested by the Gestapo after she was found to be hiding a Jew. Fauconneau Du Fresne had been arrested for arranging Netter's escape and was interned for several months in Beaune-la-Rolande wearing a white Star of David marked "Friend of the Jews". When freed by the on 11 June by the préfet de Loiret (for lack of evidence), she joined Yvonne Netter and went to Toulouse with her, remaining with her brother until 1943. Her brother, his wife Antoinette and their children were intercepted and arrested on a journey from Revel to Toulouse. Fauconneau du Fresne entrusted Netter to friends in Vendée and returned to Paris, where Netter joined her again later. Netter was in hiding until Paris's liberation, but despite this was part of the Comet Line resistance group as a liaison officer from July to December 1943 and from June to August 1944. Her brother Leo's family were transported from Toulouse on 30 July 1944 by convoy No. 81; he and his son were moved to Buchenwald concentration camp and his wife and daughter to Ravensbrück concentration camp [some sources erroneously say Bergen-Belsen and Auschwitz respectively]. Antoinette was murdered in Ravensbrück, a fate shared by Line Piguet. Leo and his two children survived to return to France.

=== Post-War Period ===
After the liberation of France, Netter recommenced her advocacy from her base in Paris. She and Fauconneau du Fresne remained close for the rest of their lives. She died on 30 August 1985 in Paris, survived by her son. In 2018, Fauconneau du Fresne was given the title Righteous Among the Nations for saving Netter, a title also previously granted to the Tessier, Piguet and Cardin families for saving her and others. A commemorative plaque in Netter's honour is installed on the exterior of 3 Quai aux Fleurs, Paris 4e.

== Published works ==
- Le Travail de la femme mariée, son activité professionnelle [The work of a married woman, her professional activity] (1923)
- L'indépendance de la femme mariée dans son activité professionnelle [The independence of a married woman in her professional activity] (1923)
- Le Code de la femme [The Women's Code] (1926)
- Le Pierrot fantoche, [The Pierrot puppet (a typical white-faced marionette pantomime character)] (novel). [Preface by Yvonne Netter] (1926)
- Code pratique de la femme et de l'enfant [Practical code for women and children] (1930)
- Les problèmes de la famille et le féminisme [Family problems and feminism] (1930)
- Plaidoyer pour la femme française [Advocacy for French women] (1936)
- De l'enfer des hommes à la cité de Dieu [From the hell of men to the city of God] [preface by Yvonne Netter.] (1947)
- La femme face à ses problèmes, défense quotidienne de ses intérêts [The Woman facing her problems, daily defence of her interests] (1962)
