= Francesca Pianzola =

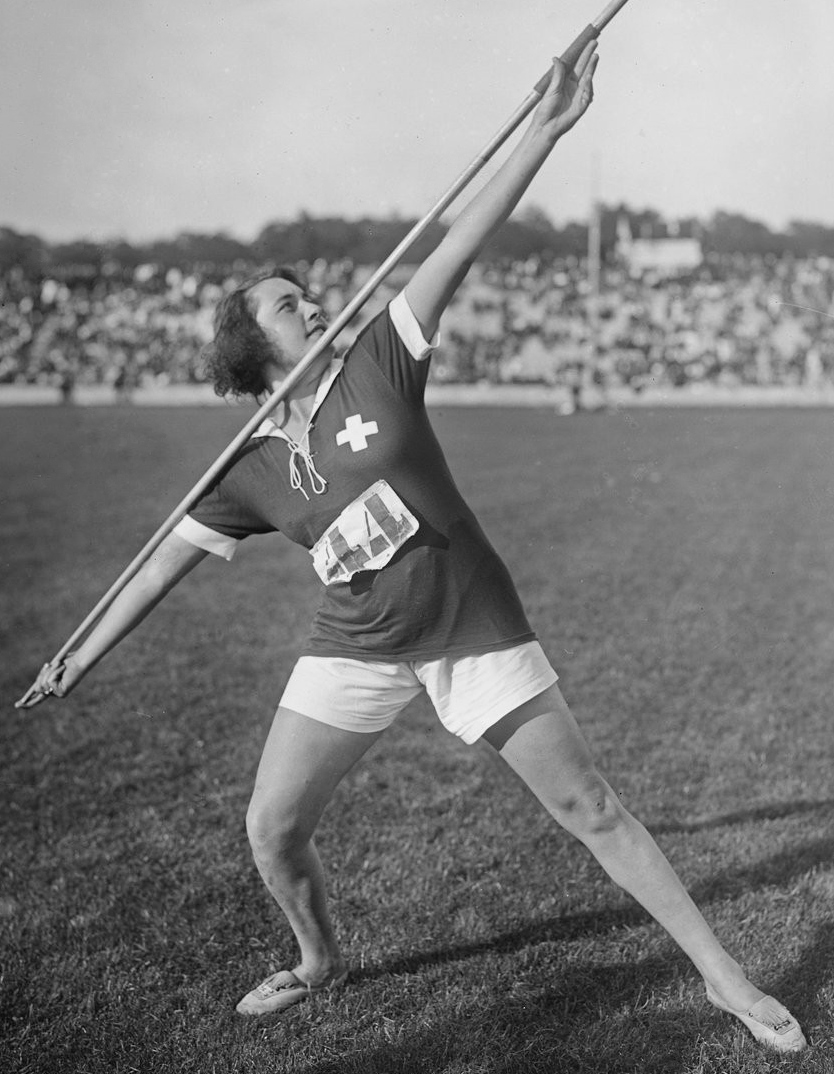
- Pianzola at the 1922 Women's World Games

Sport
- Sport: Athletics
- Event(s): Shot put, javelin throw

Achievements and titles
- Personal best: JT – 27.33 m (1923)
Medal record
Representing Switzerland
Women's World Games
Silver medal – second place	1921 Monte Carlo	Javelin throw
Gold medal – first place	1922 Monte Carlo	Javelin throw
Gold medal – first place	1922 Paris	Javelin throw
Silver medal – second place	1923 Monte Carlo	Javelin throw

Francesca Florida Pianzola was a Swiss athlete of Italian origin. She competed in the two-handed javelin throw and shot put.

In 1921 she competed at the Women's Olympiad in Monte Carlo winning silver medal in javelin. In 1922 the competed at the Women's Olympiad in Monte Carlo again winning the gold medal in javelin, later in 1922 she also competed at the first regular Women's World Games in Paris again winning gold medal in the javelin event.

In 1923 she again participated in the Women's Olympiad in Monte Carlo winning silver medal in javelin, that year she was ranked fifth in the world in the traditional javelin throw. In the same year, she founded "Les Sportives", the first documented women's soccer team in Switzerland.
