= Truus Klapwijk =

Dutch diver and swimmer (1904–1991)

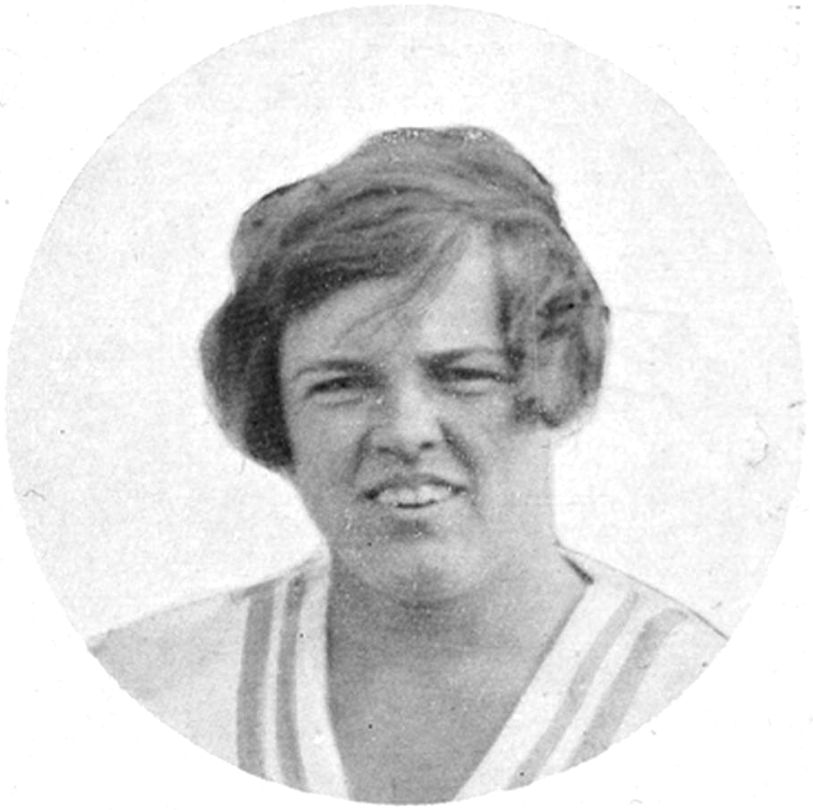
- Truus Klapwijk in 1934

Personal information
- Born: 2 January 1904 Rotterdam, Netherlands
- Died: 3 May 1991 (aged 87)

Sport
- Sport: Swimming
Medal record
Representing Netherlands
European Championships
| Silver medal – second place | 1927 Bologna | 4×100 m freestyle |

Geertruida "Truus" Klapwijk (2 January 1904 – 3 May 1991) was a Dutch diver and freestyle swimmer who competed in the 1924 and 1928 Summer Olympics. She was born and died in Rotterdam.

In 1924, she was a member of the Dutch relay team which finished sixth in the 4×100 metre freestyle relay competition. In the 400 metre freestyle event she was eliminated in the first round. She also participated in the 3-metre springboard contest but was also eliminated in the first round.

Four years later at the Amsterdam Games she finished seventh in the 3-metre springboard competition. In the 10 metre platform event she was eliminated in the first round.
