= Les Monstres sacrés =

Les Monstres sacrés is a play written by French dramatist Jean Cocteau, premiered February 1940 at the Michel Theater in Paris.

== Original cast ==
- Yvonne de Bray Esther
- Jany Holt Liane
- Suzanne Dantès Charlotte
- Claire Gérard Loulou
- Morgane The old lady
- André Brulé Florent
- Jean Hubert The Speaker
