= Mary Lines =

British athlete (1893–1978)

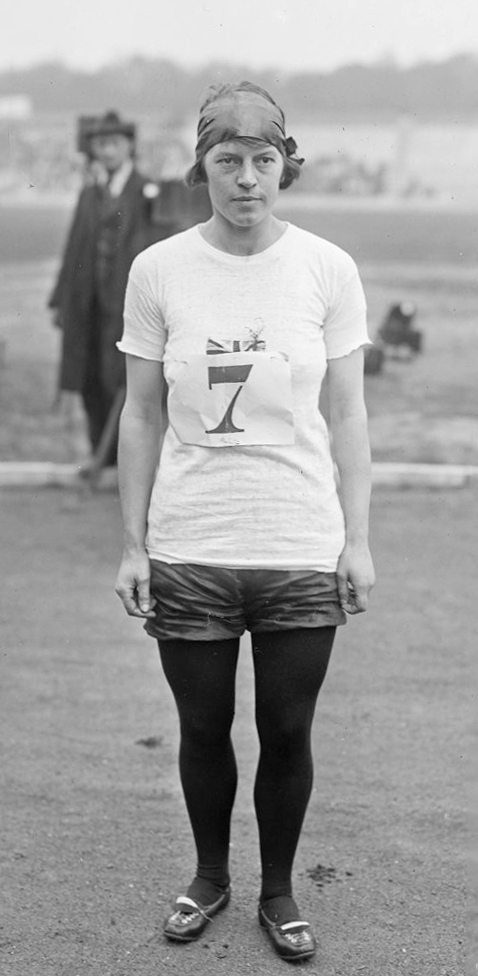
- Lines in 1921

Personal information
- Born: 3 December 1893 London, United Kingdom
- Died: December 1978 (aged 85) Worthing, England

Sport
- Sport: Athletics
- Event(s): 60–800 m, long jump, high jump
- Club: London Olympiades

Achievements and titles
- Personal best(s): 100 m – 12.8 (1922); 200 m – 26.7 (1922); 800 m – 2:25.8 (1922); 80 mH – 13.6 (1924); LJ – 5.16 m (1924); HJ – 1.422 m (1923)
Medal record
Representing United Kingdom
Women's World Games
Gold medal – first place	1921 Monte Carlo	Long jump
Gold medal – first place	1921 Monte Carlo	60 m
Gold medal – first place	1921 Monte Carlo	250 m
Silver medal – second place	1921 Monte Carlo	800 m
Gold medal – first place	1922 Paris	Long jump
Gold medal – first place	1922 Paris	300 m
Gold medal – first place	1922 Paris	4×110 yd
Silver medal – second place	1922 Paris	60 m
Bronze medal – third place	1922 Paris	100 yd

Mary Lines (later Smith, 3 December 1893 – December 1978) was a British athlete. She competed in the long jump and 60 m – 800 m running events at the 1921 Women's Olympiad, 1922 Women's Olympiad and the 1922 Women's World Games and won nine gold, two silver and one bronze medals. In 1924 she participated at the 1924 Women's Olympiad and won the gold medal in the 100 yards running and the long jump. In 1922 she participated at the Women's Olympiad in Paris and won the gold medal in the 4×110 yds relay (with Lines as first runner, Nora Callebout, Daisy Leach and Gwendoline Porter) setting a new world record.

In 1922, Lines became the national 100 yards champion, national 220 yards champion and national 880 yards champion. The following year she won the British titles in 100 yards, 440 yards, 120 yards hurdles and the long jump at the inaugural 1923 WAAA Championships.

Lines studied at the Regent Street Polytechnic and worked as a waitress. She retired from competitions in 1924 but not before she won two more AAA titles in the 120 yards hurdles and long jump at the 1924 WAAA Championships.

Lines married Mr. Smith, who died in 1946. In 1971 she moved from London to Worthing, together with her two unmarried sisters. She died in 1978 in a traffic accident, aged 85. She was rushing to post her Christmas mail and ran in front of a van.
