= Alice Stoffel =

French swimmer

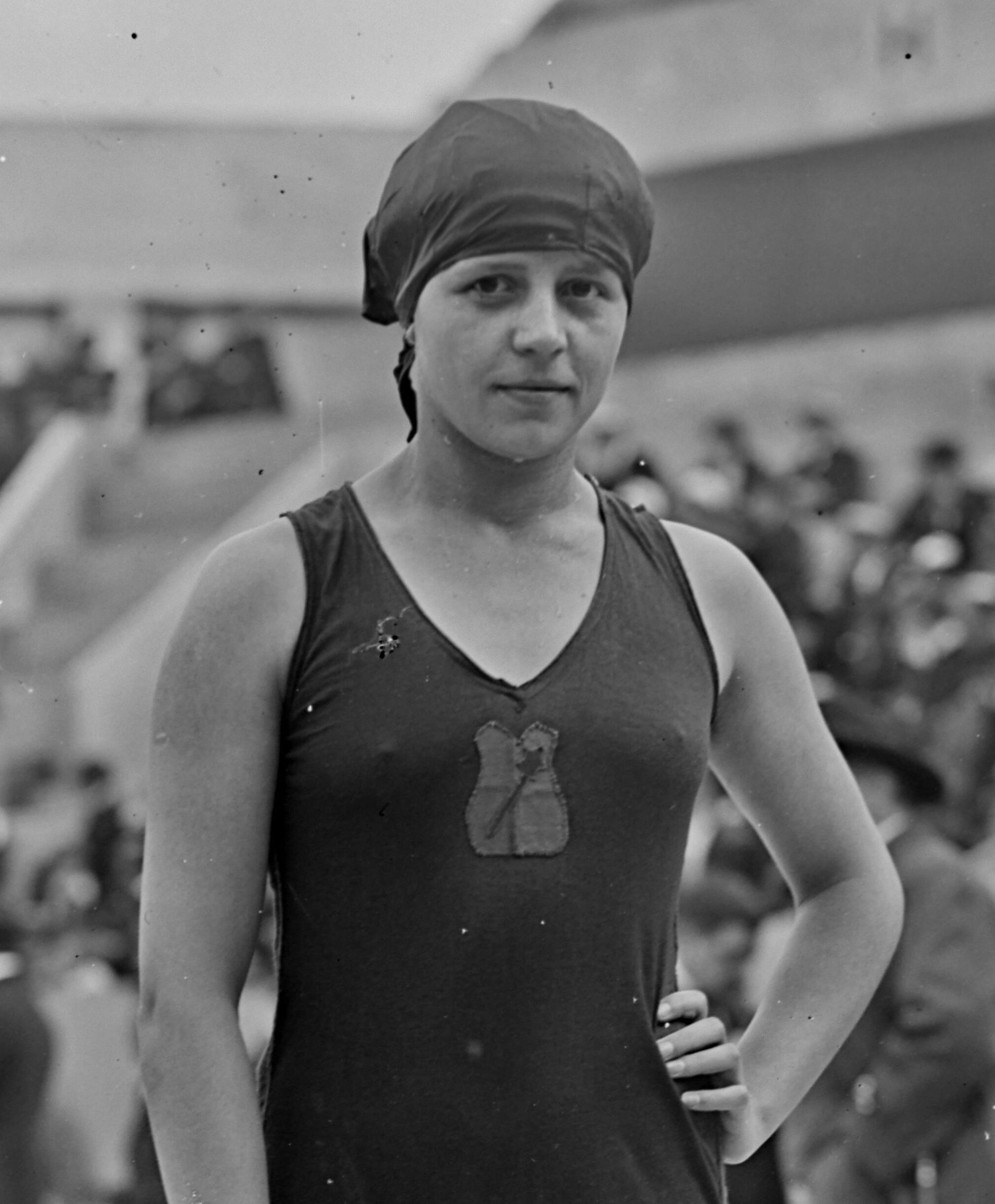
- Stoffel in 1924

Personal information
- Born: 30 October 1905 Colmar, France
- Died: 22 August 1983 (aged 77) Luxembourg, Luxembourg

Sport
- Sport: Swimming

Alice Stoffel (30 October 1905 – 22 August 1983) was a French backstroke and breaststroke swimmer. She competed at the 1924 Summer Olympics and the 1928 Summer Olympics.
