= Robert Delapierre =

Belgian philatelist

Robert Delapierre (1891-1970) was a Belgian philatelist who signed the Roll of Distinguished Philatelists in 1970.
