= Madeleine Bracquemond =

French footballer (1898–1981)

Madeleine Louise Fernande Bracquemond (1898–1981) was a French footballer who played as a striker.

== Early life ==
Bracquemond was born in 1898 to a modest family in Paris, France.

== Career ==
Bracquemond was nicknamed "Mado". She was the first captain of the French women's team. In 1921, she was part of the French women's team toured England. Besides football, she was also champion in the high jump in the 1922 Women's Olympiad in Monte Carlo, Monaco.

== Style of play ==
Bracquemond mainly operated as a striker.

== Death ==
Bracquemond died in 1981.
