= Alice Milliat =

Pioneer of women's sport

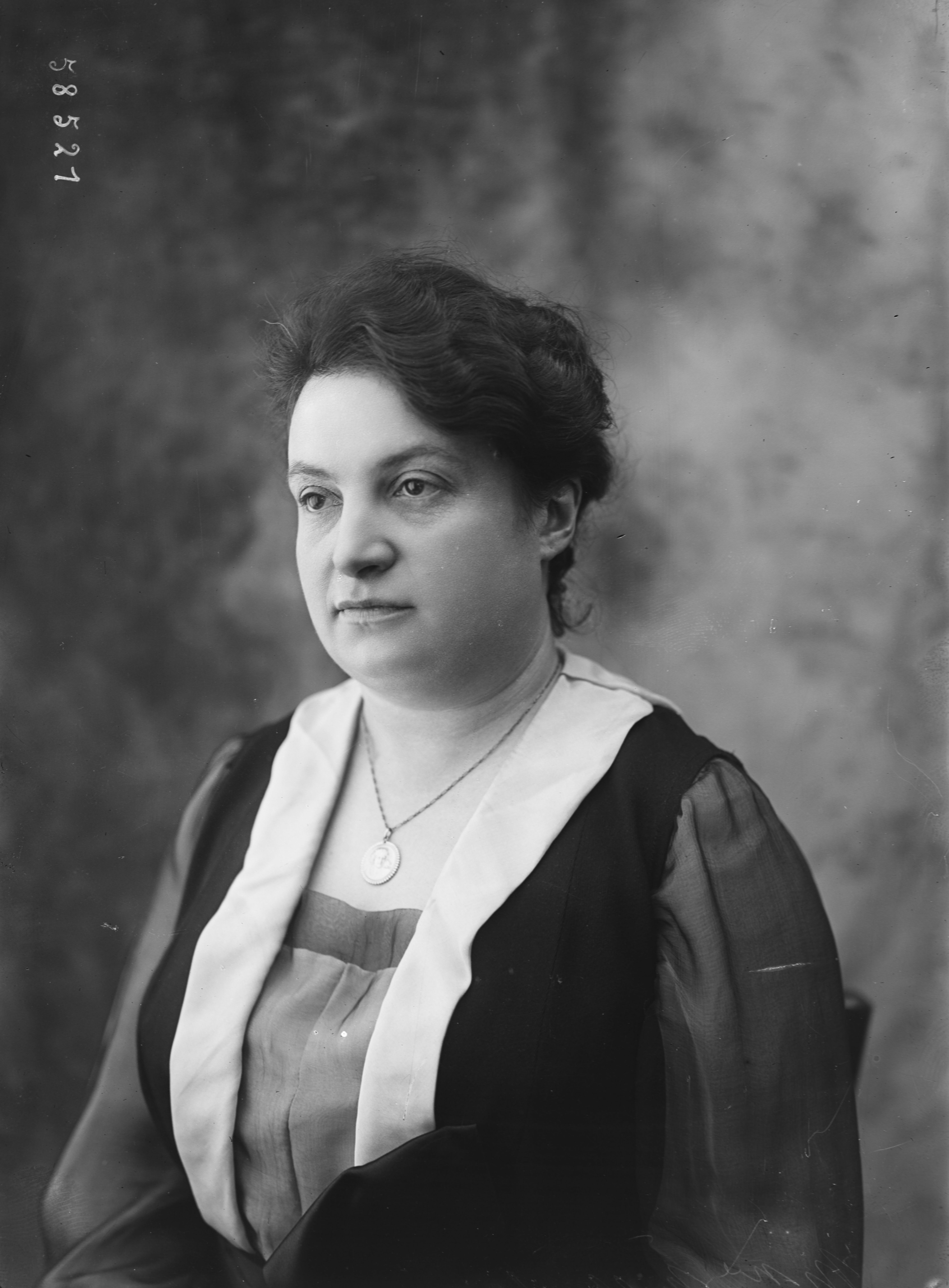
- Milliat in 1920
- Born: Alice Josephine Marie Million; May 1884; Nantes, France
- Died: 19 May 1957 (aged 73); Paris, France
- Occupations: Translator, writer, rower, soccer coach

Alice Joséphine Marie Milliat (née Million; 5 May 1884 – 19 May 1957) was a pioneer of women's sport. Her lobbying on behalf of female athletes led to the accelerated inclusion of more women's events in the Olympic Games.

A member of Fémina Sport, a club founded in 1911, Milliat helped form the Fédération Française Sportive Féminine in 1917, becoming treasurer and, in March 1919, its president. In 1921 she helped organise the 1921 Women's World Games, and then the Women's World Games, which ran for four editions from 1922 until 1934. She also managed a French women's association football team that toured the United Kingdom in 1920. On 8 March 2021, a commemorative statue of Milliat was unveiled at the French Olympic Committee's headquarters in Paris.

== Early life ==
Alice Joséphine Marie Million was born on 5 May 1884 in Nantes, the eldest of five children. Her parents were grocers. Her mother later worked as a seamstress and her father was employed in an office. In 1904, Milliat went to England. There she married Joseph Milliat, who was also from Nantes. They had no children, and he died in 1908. Whilst in England, Milliat took up rowing. After her husband's death, she travelled widely, developing language skills that enabled her to become a translator when, following the outbreak of the First World War, she returned to France. She also participated in swimming and field hockey.

== Formation of the Fédération Sportive Féminine Internationale ==
Pierre de Coubertin is credited with reviving the Olympic Games and founding the International Olympic Committee (IOC) in 1894. 1900 was the first Olympics to allow women athletes, but only in golf and tennis. Eventually, the Olympics integrated women's swimming and other events into the games. However, track and field events for women remained absent from the Olympics. A member of Fémina Sport, a club founded in 1911, Milliat helped form the Fédération Française Sportive Féminine in 1917, becoming treasurer and, in March 1919, its president.

In 1919, Milliat asked the International Association of Athletics Federations (IAAF) to include women's track and field athletics events in the 1924 Olympic Games, but they refused. (Note: The Inter-Varsity Athletics Board (IVAB) in England held its first inter-varsity track and field competition for women in 1922.) She then became involved in organising the 1921 Women's Olympiad in Monte Carlo, an event regarded as a response to the refusal include women's events in the Olympics. Sport historian Florence Carpentier noted in 2018 that Milliat did not attend the 1921 event, and believes that Milliat created the Fédération Sportive Féminine Internationale (FSFI) and instituted the 1922 Women's World Games in opposition to the 1922 Women's Olympiad to ensure feminist control over women's international sports competitions. French Athletics Federation (FFA) archive records show that Marcel Delabre, vice-president of the FFA and chair of the 1921 Women's Olympiad organising committee, saw the Women's Olympiad as a means for the FFA to control women's athletics. The 1921 Women's Olympiad took place on a pigeon shooting field, in the absence of a running track. In 1922, 300 athletes competed, representing seven nations. Further editions of the Women's Olympiad were held in 1923 and 1924.

Meanwhile, in 1917, Milliat had organised a successful women's association football tournament, and in 1920 she assembled and managed a football team of women from Paris that toured the United Kingdom and, representing France, and played against the Dick, Kerr's Ladies in the first European international women's football tournament. From the early 1920s, she was a writer for French magazines including Le Soldat de Demain and L'Auto, and promoted football for women in articles.

== Women's World Games ==
In August 1922, the Jeux Olympiques Féminins (also known as the 1922 Women's World Games), regarded as the first Women's Olympics took place in Pershing Stadium in Paris and featured five teams, representing including the United States, Great Britain, Switzerland, Czechoslovakia and host country France. Eleven athletics events were conducted and the 20,000 strong crowd saw eighteen athletes break several world records. The choice of venue was influenced by Paris being the home city of Coubertin, who was among the most vocal opponents to women's participation in the Olympics, as Milliat wanted the games to be a showcase to the International Olympic Committee (IOC). When Henri de Baillet-Latour succeeded Coubertin as head of the IOC, the intention was to hold the next event in his home country, but the Belgian organisers withdrew their participation.

Infuriated by the use of the term 'Olympic Games', the IOC convinced Milliat and the FSFI to change the name of their event in exchange for adding 10 women's events to the 1928 Olympics. As such, the next edition of the event, held in Gothenburg, Sweden in 1926, was termed the Women's World Games. Ten teams took part in this edition of the Games. Due to pressure from the FSFI, the IOC eventually integrated five women's track and field events into the Olympics in 1928. However, to Milliat, this was not enough, since men were allowed to compete in 22 events. The British women's team boycotted the Amsterdam games for the same reason.

Two further World Games were held in Prague in 1930 (featuring other sports in addition to athletics) and in London in 1934. After these games, Milliat issued an ultimatum: fully integrate the 1936 Olympics, or cede all women's participation to the FSFI. This led the IAAF to appoint a special commission to cooperate with the FSFI, which ceded control of international women's athletics to the IAAF in exchange for an expanded program and a recognition of records set in the Women's Games.

Although the FSFI had staged events with an increasing number of participants, and expanded its membership from the initial five nations to at the 1922 Games to thirty countries in 1936, it never met again after the decision about the 1936 Olympics, and Milliat's engagement with women's sport ended. Under successive IOC presidents, the proportion of women competitors at the Olympics never rose above 15% until the 1970s. Milliat died in Paris on 19 May 1957.

== Legacy ==
In 1934, Milliat spoke to an interviewer from the Women's Magazine Independent Woman. In her statement, she advocated for women's suffrage in France. She believed women's suffrage would lead to greater support for women's sports. Carpentier believes that Milliat's feminist beliefs have been glossed over or ignored in earlier biographical accounts, and claims that these beliefs were central to inspiring Milliat's endeavours on behalf of women's sport. In a 1934 interview, Milliat said:

"Women's sports of all kinds are handicapped in my country by the lack of playing space. As we have no vote, we can not make our needs publicly felt, or bring pressure to bear in the right quarters. I always tell my girls that the vote is one of the things they will have to work for if France is to keep its place with the other nations in the realm of feminine sport."

The Fondation Alice Milliat was established in 2016 and promotes women's sport in France and the rest of Europe. There are gymnasiums named after Milliat in Bordeaux and in Paris. On 8 March 2021, a statue of Alice Milliat was unveiled at the French Olympic Committee's headquarters in Paris, in recognition of her efforts for the recognition of women's sports. In The Times later than month, Elgan Alderman wrote that the 1921 Women's World Games was a "seismic moment" for progress in women's sport at the Olympics, and that no-one had contributed more than Milliat in enabling the development. Mary Leigh and Thérèse M. Bonnin concluded in 1977 that without Milliat and the FSFI's efforts, track and field events at the Olympics would only have been opened to women much later.
