= Elise Van Truyen =

Belgian athletics competitor

Personal information
- Full name: Elise Louise Van Truyen
- Born: 13 April 1906 Anderlecht, Belgium
- Died: unknown

Sport
- Country: Belgium
- Sport: Sprinting
- Event: 4 × 100 metres relay

Elise Van Truyen (born 13 April 1906, date of death unknown) was a Belgian sprinter. In 1924 she participated at the 1924 Women's Olympiad where she won gold medal in the high jump event. She competed in the women's 4 × 100 metres relay at the 1928 Summer Olympics.
