= 1928 WAAA Championships =

British athletics event

- Dates: 14 July
- Host city: London
- Venue: Stamford Bridge
- Level: Senior
- Type: Outdoor

The 1928 WAAA Championships were the national track and field championships for women in the United Kingdom.

The event was held at Stamford Bridge, London, on 14 July 1928.

== Results ==
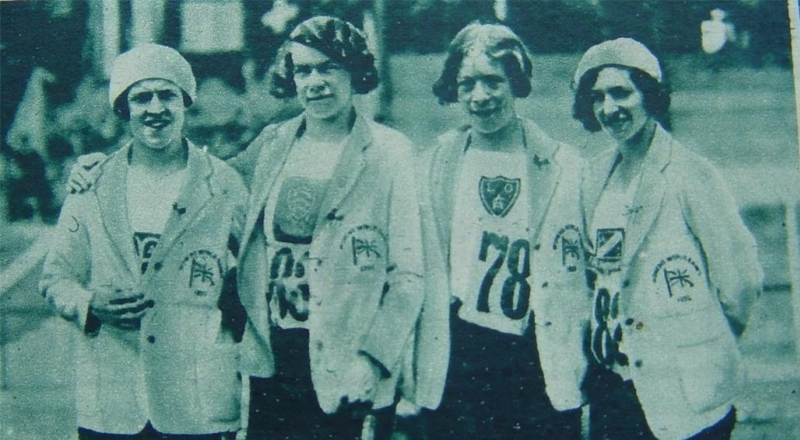
Muriel Gunn (far left) and Daisy Ridgley (second from right) finished 1st and 2nd in the 100 yards

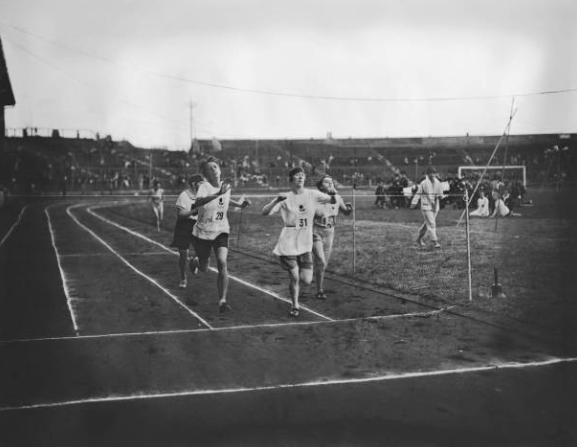
Ivy Barber wins the 880 yards

Event	Gold		Silver		Bronze	
100 yards	Muriel Gunn	11.6	Daisy Ridgley	2 yards	Rose Thompson	1 foot
220 yards	(Japan) Kinue Hitomi	26.2	Ivy Walker	3 yards	Marion King	1 foot
440 yards	Florence Haynes	60.8 WR	Annie Stone	60.9e	Ivy Barber	8 yards
880 yards	Ivy Barber	2:27.6	Lilian Styles	4 yards	Mary Firmin	15 yards
100 yards hurdles	(South Africa) Marjorie Clark	13.8 WB	Hilda Hatt	14.0e NR	Muriel Gunn	1 yard
High jump	(South Africa) Marjorie Clark	1.524	Marjorie O'Kell	1.473	Barbara Holliday	1.448
Long jump	Muriel Gunn	5.68 NR	(Japan) Kinue Hitomi	5.36	Josephine Matthews	5.15
Shot put	Mary Weston	18.90 (NR)	Florence Birchenough	16.86	Louise Fawcett	15.14
Discus throw	Florence Birchenough	27.93	Louise Fawcett	25.96	Mary Weston	24.74
Javelin	(Japan) Kinue Hitomi	35.97	Mary Weston	29.70 (NR)	Louise Fawcett	25.55
1 mile walk	Lucy Howes	8:27.4	Virna Horwood	8:30.4	Margaret Hegarty	
660-yard relay	London Olympiades AC	1.17.1/5	Middlesex Ladies		Fry's AC	

== See also ==
- 1928 AAA Championships
