= List of British champions in discus throw =

The British discus athletics champions covers three competitions; the current British Athletics Championships which was founded in 2007, the preceding AAA Championships (1914-2006) and the UK Athletics Championships which existed from 1977 until 1997 and ran concurrently with the AAA Championships.

Where an international athlete won the AAA Championships the highest ranking UK athlete is considered the National Champion in this list.

== Past winners ==
AAA Championships men's event only
Year	Men's champion
1914	Walter Henderson
1920	NBA
1921	Walter Henderson
1922	Walter Henderson
1923	George Mitchell

AAA Championships & WAAA Championships
Year	Men's champion	Year	Women's champion
1924	Donald Ross	1924	Florence Birchenough
1925	NBA	1925	Florence Birchenough
1926	Charles Best	1926	Florence Birchenough
1927	NBA	1927	Florence Birchenough
1928	Charles Best	1928	Florence Birchenough
1929	Kenneth Pridie	1929	Mary Weston
1930	Kenneth Pridie	1930	Louise Fawcett
1931	Kenneth Pridie	1931	Irene Phillips
1932	Kenneth Pridie	1932	Ada Holland
1933	Kenneth Pridie	1933	Ada Holland
1934	Douglas Bell	1934	Irene Phillips
1935	Douglas Bell	1935	Ada Holland
1936	Laurence Reavell-Carter	1936	Irene Phillips
1937	David Young	1937	Irene Phillips
1938	David Young	1938	Bevis Reid
1939	James Nesbitt	1939	Bevis Reid
1945	nc	1945	Kathleen Dyer
1946	James Nesbitt	1946	Dora Endruweit
1947	James Nesbitt	1947	Margaret Lucas
1948	Jack Brewer	1948	Bevis Reid
1949	Jack Brewer	1949	Bevis Shergold (Reid)
1950	Harry Duguid	1950	Joyce Smith
1951	Mark Pharaoh	1951	Bevis Shergold (Reid)
1952	Mark Pharaoh	1952	Suzanne Farmer
1953	Mark Pharaoh	1953	Suzanne Farmer
1954	Mark Pharaoh	1954	Maya Giri
1955	Mark Pharaoh	1955	Maya Giri
1956	Mark Pharaoh	1956	Suzanne Allday
1957	Mike Lindsay	1957	Sylvia Needham
1958	Gerry Carr	1958	Suzanne Allday
1959	Mike Lindsay	1959	Suzanne Allday
1960	Mike Lindsay	1960	Suzanne Allday
1961		1961	Suzanne Allday
1962	Roy Hollingsworth	1962	Suzanne Allday
1963	Mike Lindsay	1963	Suzanne Allday
1964	Roy Hollingsworth	1964	Rosemary Payne
1965	Mike Lindsay	1965	Rosemary Payne
1966	Bill Tancred	1966	Rosemary Payne
1967	Bill Tancred	1967	Rosemary Payne
1968	Bill Tancred	1968	Rosemary Payne
1969	Bill Tancred	1969	Rosemary Payne
1970	Bill Tancred	1970	Rosemary Payne
1971	John Watts	1971	Rosemary Payne
1972	Bill Tancred	1972	Rosemary Payne
1973	Bill Tancred	1973	Rosemary Payne
1974	Bill Tancred	1974	Rosemary Payne
1975	Bill Tancred	1975	Meg Ritchie
1976	Pete Tancred	1976	Janet Thompson

AAA Championships/WAAA Championships & UK Athletics Championships dual championships era 1977-1987
Year	AAA Men	Year	WAAA Women	Year	UK Men	UK Women
1977	Pete Tancred	1977	Meg Ritchie	1977	Pete Tancred	Meg Ritchie
1978	Pete Tancred	1978	Janet Thompson	1978	Peter Gordon	Meg Ritchie
1979	Richard Slaney	1979	Janet Thompson	1979	Richard Slaney	Meg Ritchie
1980	Pete Tancred	1980	Lesley Mallin	1980	Pete Tancred	Meg Ritchie
1981	Robert Weir	1981	Meg Ritchie	1981	Peter Gordon	Venissa Head
1982	Robert Weir	1982	Janette Picton	1982	Peter Gordon	Lesley Bryant
1983	Robert Weir	1983	Lynda Whiteley	1983	Pete Tancred	Venissa Head
1984	Robert Weir	1984	Lynda Whiteley	1984	Paul Mardle	Venissa Head
1985	Paul Mardle	1985	Julia Avis	1985	Paul Mardle	Julia Avis
1986	Richard Slaney	1986	Kathryn Farr	1986	Graham Savory	Venissa Head
1987	Paul Mardle	1987	Ellen Mulvihill	1987	Paul Mardle	Kathryn Farr

AAA Championships & UK Athletics Championships dual championships era 1988-1997
Year	Men AAA	Women AAA	Year	Men UK	Women UK
1988	Paul Mardle	Jackie McKernan	1988	Paul Mardle	Venissa Head
1989	Paul Mardle	Janette Picton	1989	Graham Savory	Jackie McKernan
1990	Abi Ekoku	Jackie McKernan	1990	Paul Mardle	Jackie McKernan
1991	Simon Williams	Jackie McKernan	1991	Paul Mardle	Jackie McKernan
1992	Abi Ekoku	Jackie McKernan	1992	Abi Ekoku	Jackie McKernan
1993	Robert Weir	Tracy Axten	1993	Darrin Morris	Jackie McKernan
1994	Kevin Brown	Jackie McKernan	n/a		
1995	Robert Weir	Jackie McKernan	n/a		
1996	Robert Weir	Jackie McKernan	n/a		
1997	Robert Weir	Jackie McKernan	1997	Robert Weir	Shelley Drew

AAA Championships second era 1998-2006
Year	Men's champion	Women's champion
1998	Robert Weir	Shelley Drew
1999	Robert Weir	Shelley Drew
2000	Robert Weir	Shelley Drew
2001	Glen Smith	Shelley Drew
2002	Robert Weir	Philippa Roles
2003	Emeka Udechuku	Shelley Newman
2004	Emeka Udechuku	Philippa Roles
2005	Carl Myerscough	Philippa Roles
2006	Carl Myerscough	Claire Smithson

British Athletics Championships 2007 to present
Year	Men's champion	Women's champion
2007	Emeka Udechuku	Philippa Roles
2008	Emeka Udechuku	Emma Carpenter
2009	Emeka Udechuku	Philippa Roles
2010	Brett Morse	Jade Nicholls
2011	Abdul Buhari	Jade Nicholls
2012	Lawrence Okoye	Eden Francis
2013	Brett Morse	Jade Lally
2014	Zane Duquemin	Eden Francis
2015	Brett Morse	Jade Lally
2016	Nicholas Percy	Jade Lally
2017	Nicholas Percy	Jade Lally
2018	Brett Morse	Jade Lally
2019	Nicholas Percy	Jade Lally
2020	Nicholas Percy	Kirsty Law
2021	Lawrence Okoye	Eden Francis
2022	Nicholas Percy	Jade Lally
2023	Lawrence Okoye	Jade Lally
2024	Chukwuemeka Osammor	Divine Oladipo
2025	Lawrence Okoye	Zara Obamakinwa
2026	Lawrence Okoye	

- NBA = No British athlete in medal placings
- nc = not contested
