= 1924 Women's Olympiad =

1924 international athletics competition

- Host city: London
- Country: United Kingdom
- Dates: 4 August 1924

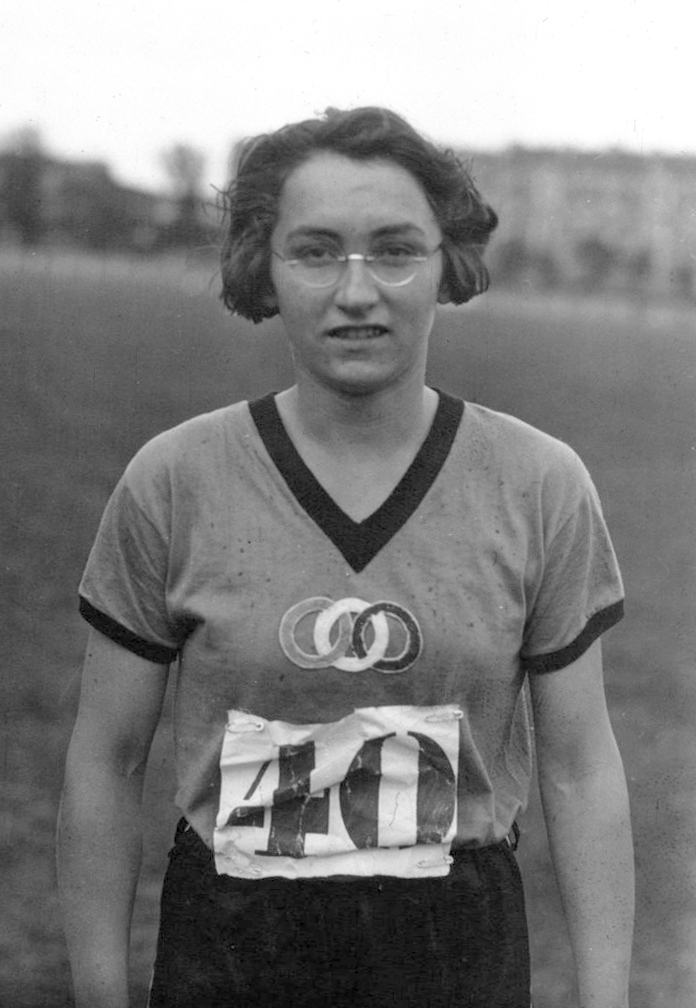
Marguerite Radideau

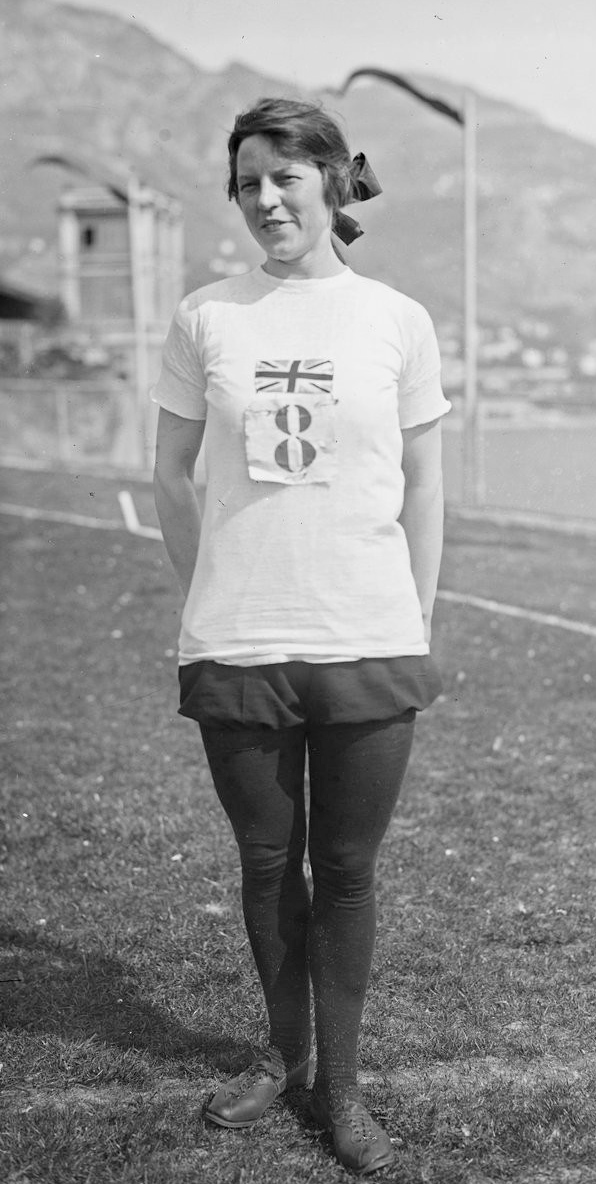
Mary Lines

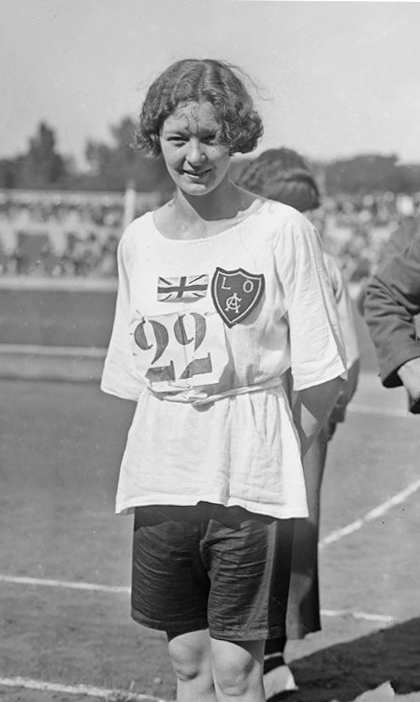
Hilda Hatt

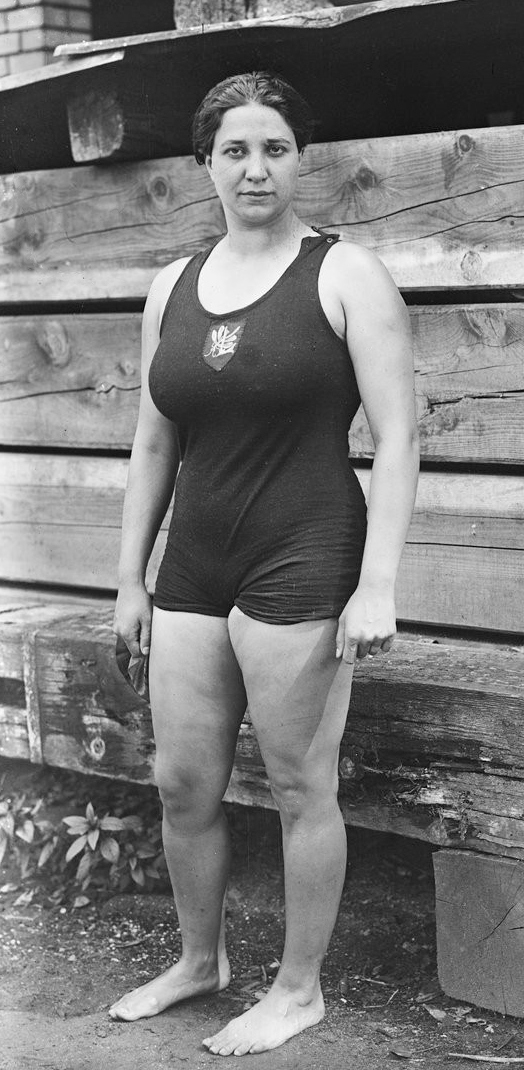
Violette Morris

The 1924 Women's Olympiad (formally called Women's International and British Games, French Grand meeting international féminin) was the first international competition for women in track and field in the United Kingdom. The tournament was held on 4 August 1924 in London, United Kingdom.

== Events ==
After the successful first 1922 Women's World Games in Paris and the three Women's Olympiads (1921 Women's Olympiad, 1922 Women's Olympiad and 1923 Women's Olympiad) in Monaco the interest for women's sports also grew internationally. In 1922 the "Women's Amateur Athletic Association" (WAAA) was founded in the UK: the WAAA organised the first official British women championships in track and field (WAAA Championships) on 18 August 1923 at the Oxo Sports Ground in Downham outside London. In the US the "Amateur Athletic Union" (AAU) organised the first official American women championships in track and field on 29 September 1923 at Weequahic Park in Newark, New Jersey.

The 1924 Women's Olympiad was organised in cooperation with the newspapers News of the World, Sporting Life and Daily Mirror in cooperation with the WAAA and the Fédération Sportive Féminine Internationale (FSFI) under chairwoman Alice Milliat.

The games were attended by participants from 8 nations: Belgium, Canada (exhibition events only), Czechoslovakia, France, Italy, Switzerland, the United Kingdom and the USA (exhibition events only). The tournament was a huge promotion for women's sports.

Team	Nation	Participants
1	Belgium	?
2	Canada	?
3	Czechoslovakia	?
4	France	?
5	Italy	?
6	Switzerland	?
7	United Kingdom	?
8	USA	?

The athletes competed in 12 events: running (100 yards, 250 metres, 1000 metres), relay race (4 x 110 yards and 4 x 220 yards), hurdling 120 yards, racewalking 1000 metres, high jump, long jump, discus throw, shot put and javelin. The tournament also held exhibition events in cycling (two-thirds of a mile bicycle sprint), netball, and gymnastics.

The multi-sport event was held at Stamford Bridge stadium in Fulham in southwest London. The games attracted an audience of 25,000 spectators.

== Results ==
Almost all medals went to athletes from France and the United Kingdom.

During the games 7 world records were set: Mary Lines in hurdling 120 yd and running 250 m, Edith Trickey in running 1000 m, Albertine Regel in walking 1000 m, Elise van Truyen in high jump, Violette Morris in discus and Louise Groslimond in javelin. Poorly performed measuring however led to that only 2 records, Trickey in running 1000 metres and Regel in walking 1000 metres, to be later ratified.

Results in each event:

Event	Gold		Silver		Bronze	
100 yds	Rose Thompson; United Kingdom	11,2 sec	Eileen Edwards; United Kingdom		Marguerite Radideau; France	
250 m	Mary Lines; United Kingdom	34,6 sec	Vera Palmer; United Kingdom		Marie Mejzlíková I Czechoslovakia	
1000 m	Edith Trickey; United Kingdom	3,08,2 min	Hilda Hatt; United Kingdom		Ida Degrande; Belgium	
Relay 4×110 yds	Manor Park; United Kingdom	53,4 sec	London Olympiades; United Kingdom		Middlesex; United Kingdom	
Relay 4×220 yds	United Kingdom; Vera Palmer; Lesley Gamble; Eileen Edwards; Rose Thompson	1,18.6 min	France	1,21.0 min	Belgium	
Hurdling 120 yds	Mary Lines; United Kingdom	18,2 sec (17,4 sec in trials)	Hilda Hatt; United Kingdom		Henriette van Daelen; Belgium	
Walking 1000 m	Albertine Regel; France	5,14.0 min	Edith Trickey; United Kingdom	5,23.2 min	Keeling; United Kingdom	
High jump	Elise Van Truyen; Belgium	1,51 m / 4 ft 11½ in	Marguerite Patouillet; France	1,49 m / 4 ft 11 in	Ivy Lowman; United Kingdom	1,48 m
Long jump	Mary Lines; United Kingdom	5,20 m	Sophie Eliott-Lynn; United Kingdom		Bozena Srámková; Czechoslovakia	
Discus	Violette Morris; France	30,12 m	Marie Janderová; Czechoslovakia	26,73 m	Florence Birchenough; United Kingdom	
Shot put two-handed^{[nb]}	Violette Morris; France	19,95 m	Beatrice Manton; United Kingdom		Marie Mejzlíková I Czechoslovakia	
Javelin two-handed^{[nb]}	Louise Groslimond; Switzerland	47,65 m / 156 ft ¼ in	Bozena Srámková; Czechoslovakia		Adrienne Kaenel; Switzerland	43,19 m / 141 ft ¼ in

- ^{nb} Each athlete in the shot put and javelin throw events threw using their right hand, then their left. Their final mark was the total of the best mark with their right-handed throw and the best mark with their left-handed throw.

Team	Nation	Points
1	United Kingdom	61
2	France	31
3	Belgium	15
4	Czechoslovakia	13
5	Switzerland	7
6	Italy	?

== Legacy ==
The tournament was a huge promotion for women's sports, a follow-up was held in 1925 ("Daily Mirror Trophy") also at Stamford Bridge. In 1926 the second regular Women's World Games were held at Gothenburg.
