= 1929 WAAA Championships =

British athletics event

- Dates: 13 July
- Host city: London
- Venue: Stamford Bridge
- Level: Senior
- Type: Outdoor

The 1929 WAAA Championships were the national track and field championships for women in the United Kingdom.

The event was held at Stamford Bridge, London, on 13 July 1929.

== Results ==
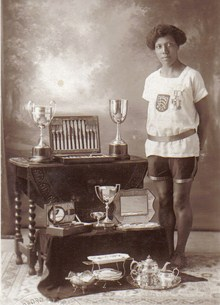
Ethel Scott, the first Black woman to represent Great Britain finished second in the 100 yards

Event	Gold		Silver		Bronze	
100 yards	Ivy Walker	11.4 =NR	Ethel Scott	1 foot	Eileen Hiscock	1 foot
220 yards	Winifred Weldon	26.4	Florence Haynes	7 yards	Madge Wannop	1 foot
440 yards	Marion King	59.2 WR	Annie Stone	59.2e =WR	Ellen Wright	15 yards
880 yards	Violet Streater	2:25.8	Ruth Christmas	inches	Lilian Styles	5 yards
80 metres hurdles	Hilda Hatt	12.4 NR	Muriel Cornell	inches	Kathleen Tiffen	1 foot
High jump	Marjorie O'Kell	1.473	Hilda Thorogood	1.448	Hilda Hatt	1.422
Long jump	Muriel Cornell	5.78	Josephine Matthews	5.19	Jean Knights	5.08
Shot put	Mary Weston	19.04	Florence Birchenough	16.98	Elsie Otway	16.06
Discus throw	Mary Weston	30.50	Florence Birchenough	26.97	Nellie Purvey	26.91
Javelin	Mary Weston	25.91	Louise Fawcett	24.18	Ivy Hughes	20.98
1 mile walk	Lucy Howes	8:18.0	Virna Horwood	8:32.4	Margaret Hegarty	40 yards
660-yard relay	Manor Park	1.17.3/5	Cambridge H		Middlesex Ladies	

== See also ==
- 1929 AAA Championships
