= Kinue Hitomi =

Japanese athlete (1907–1931)

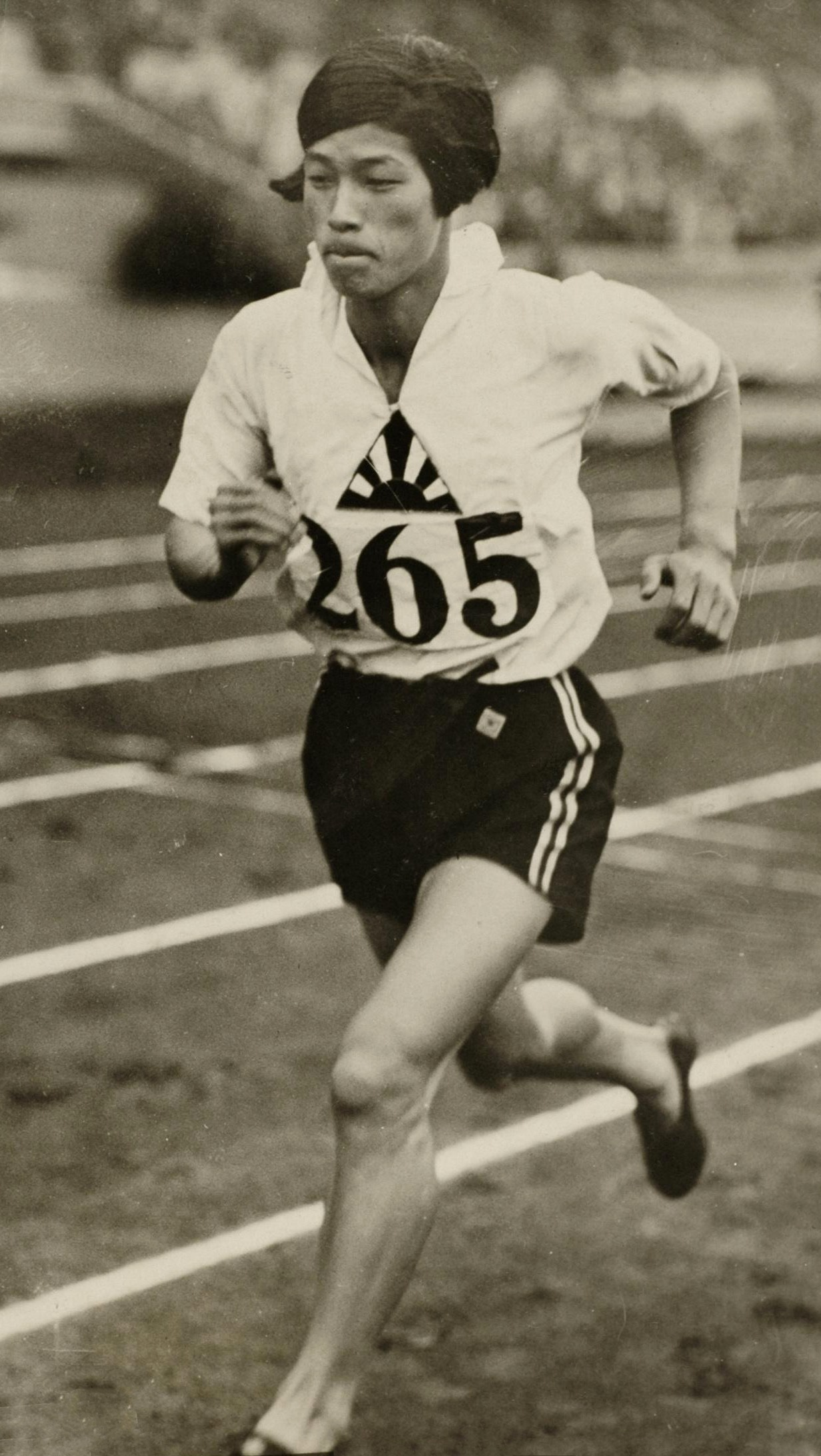
- Kinue Hitomi at the 1928 Olympics

Personal information
- Native name: 人見 絹枝
- Nationality: Japanese
- Born: January 1, 1907 Okayama, Japan
- Died: August 2, 1931 (aged 24) Osaka, Japan

Sport
- Sport: Women's athletics
- Event: All
Medal record
Women's athletics
Representing Japan
Olympic Games
Silver medal – second place	1928 Amsterdam	800 metres
Women's World Games
Gold medal – first place	1926 Gothenburg	Long jump
Gold medal – first place	1926 Gothenburg	Standing long jump
Gold medal – first place	1930 Prague	Long Jump
Silver medal – second place	1926 Gothenburg	Discus
Silver medal – second place	1930 Prague	Triathlon
Bronze medal – third place	1926 Gothenburg	100 yards
Bronze medal – third place	1930 Prague	60 metres
Bronze medal – third place	1930 Prague	Javelin

Kinue Hitomi (人見 絹枝, Hitomi Kinue; January 1, 1907 – August 2, 1931) was a Japanese track and field athlete. She was the world record holder in several events in the 1920s – 1930s. Hitomi was also the first Japanese and Asian woman to win an Olympic medal. She was also the first woman to represent Japan at the Olympics.

== Biography ==
Hitomi was born in what is now part of Okayama City. In November 1923 during the 2nd Okayama Prefectural Women's Games, she set an unofficial national record of 4m67 in the long jump event. In April 1924, Hitomi entered what is now the Japan Women's College of Physical Education. She returned to Okayama in October 1924 to participate in the 3rd Okayama Prefectural Women's Games, where she set an unofficial world record of 10m33 in the triple jump event. She bested this record the following month at the 1924 Meiji Shrine Games in Tokyo, with a distance of 11m35 and also set an unofficial world record for the Javelin throw of 26m37.

In October 1925, Hitomi participated in the 4th Osaka Games, winning first place in the 50 metres event, and again besting her unofficial world record for the triple jump with a distance of 11m62. In the 1925 Meiji Shrine Games in Tokyo, she won both the 50 metres event and the triple jump.

In April 1926, Hitomi went to work for the Osaka Mainichi Shimbun newspaper. In May, she set new unofficial national records for the long jump (5m06), shot put (10m39), 100m hurdles (15m4) at the 3rd Women's Olympics held by the newspaper at Miyoshino. In June, in a completion sponsored by the Tokyo Mainichi Shimbun newspaper, she set new unofficial national records for the long jump (5m75) and the 4 × 100 metres relay (52s2).

In August 1926, Hitomi was selected to attend the "2èmes Jeux mondiaux féminins FSFI" games at Gothenburg, Sweden as the only Japanese woman athlete. She travelled by the Trans-Siberian Railway alone to Moscow, where a reporter from the Mainichi Shimbun met her and escorted her to Sweden. Competing in a total of six events, she received a gold medal for the long jump, with a distance of 5m50, setting a new official world record, as well as a gold medal for the standing long jump (2m49), silver medal for the discus throw (32m61) and bronze medal for the 100-yard dash (12.0 seconds). She also received an honorary prize from Alice Milliat, president of Fédération Sportive Féminine Internationale (FSFI) for the most individual points at 15.

In May 1927, at the 3rd Women's Athletic Meet at Meiji Shrine in Tokyo, Hitomi set two new unofficial world records for the 200-meter run (26.1 seconds) and the standing jump (2m61). She also tied the world record for the 100-meter run at a meet in Osaka in June. At a meet in Tokyo in October of the same year, she unofficially tied the world record for the 50-meter sprint (6.4 seconds) as well as the 100-meter sprint (12.4 seconds). Hitomi continued to set unofficial new world records in early 1928, with the 400-meter run (59.0 seconds) and 100-meter sprint (12.4 seconds) in Tokyo. At the Olympic qualifying event in Osaka, she set new official world records for the long jump (5m98) and the 100-meter spring (12.0 seconds), and was one of the first women to be included into a Japanese Olympic Team.

Shortly before the Olympics, Kinue won the British WAAA Championships title in the 220 yards and javelin events at the 1928 WAAA Championships.

During the 1928 Summer Olympics in Amsterdam, Hitomi was the only Japanese woman athlete to compete. She entered the 100m, discus, and high jump individual events but had been concentrating most on the 100m. However, she lost this event in semifinals. She then decided to join 800m in haste (she hadn't run an 800m race at any official competition until that time), and as last-minute entries were still permitted, she was allowed to compete. Hitomi ran 2:26.2 in the preliminary and received a silver medal in the final with a time of 2:17.6, in a race won by Lina Radke in 2:16.8. She became the first Japanese woman to win an Olympic medal.

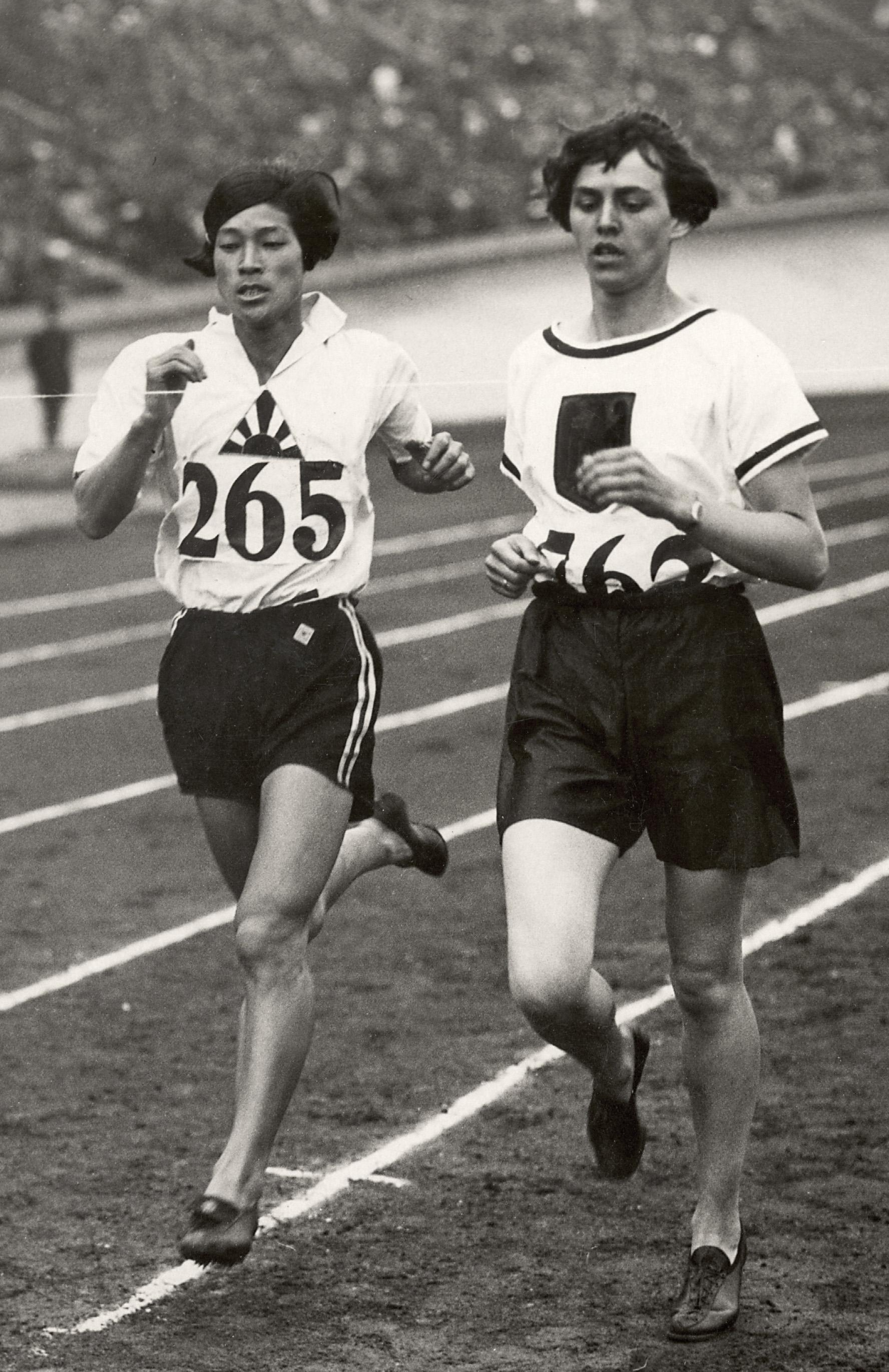
Hitomi (left) racing Lina Radke in the 800 metres at the 1928 Amsterdam Olympics

In April 1929 Hitomi achieved 217 points in the triathlon (100m, high jump, javelin) setting an unofficial world record at the 6th Japan Women's Olympics at Miyoshino. In May, she set an official world record for the 200-meter run with a time 24.7 seconds in Tokyo. This was followed in October by new unofficial world records of 12.0 seconds for the 100m and 7.5 for the 60m sprint in Shenyang.

In early 1930, Hitomi was asked to lecture to women's schools around the country. In July, she set new official national records for the long jump and javelin throw. In September, she participated in the "3èmes Jeux mondiaux féminins FSFI" games at Prague with five younger Japanese athletes. During this event, she won the gold medal for the long jump, silver medal for the triathlon and bronze medal for the javelin throw, despite suffering from a fever. She was also awarded a silver medal for her 12 individual points.

After the event, the Japanese team went on tour to Warsaw, Berlin, Brussels, Paris and London for competitions within the next half-month. This extremely tough schedule took a toll on her health. Even after her return to Japan, she was asked to lecture, and visited sponsors and contributors in many Japanese cities without much rest. She was also surprised by the unexpected hostile reception to her athletic successes by the Japanese public. On March 25, 1931, she entered a hospital in Osaka under a false name to avoid publicity. Hitomi died from pneumonia on August 2, just three years after her Amsterdam Olympic 800m final.

== Gallery ==
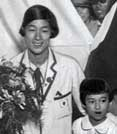
Kinue Hitomi:Silver medalist of Woman's 800m Athletics at the 1928 Amsterdam Olympic Games

== See also ==
- Idaten (TV series)
- Japan at the 1928 Summer Olympics

Records
Preceded by Gertrud Gladitsch	Women's 100 metres 20 May 1928–2 June 1928	Succeeded by Betty Robinson
Preceded by Eileen Edwards	Women's 200 metres 19 May 1929–13 Aug 1933	Succeeded by Tollien Schuurman
Preceded by Muriel Gunn	Women's Long Jump; 28 Aug 1926–01 Aug 1927	Succeeded by Muriel Gunn
Preceded by Muriel Gunn	Women's Long Jump; 20 May 1928–30 Jul 1939	Succeeded by Christel Schultz
Preceded by Adrienne Kaenel	Women's Triple Jump; Not officially ratified by the IAAF; 17 October 1926–21 October 1939	Succeeded by Rie Yamaguchi
