= Karen Pugh =

British discus thrower

Personal information
- Nationality: British (English)
- Born: Q3, 1965 Nuneaton, Warwickshire, England

Sport
- Sport: Athletics
- Event: discus throw
Medal record
Athletics
Representing England
Commonwealth Games
Bronze medal – third place	1986 Edinburgh	discus

Karen Lavinia Pugh (born Q3, 1965), is a female former athlete who competed for England.

== Biography ==
Pugh finished second behind Lynda Whiteley in the discus throw event at the 1984 WAAA Championships and second behind Julia Avis at the 1984 WAAA Championships.

Pugh represented England and won a bronze medal in the discus event, at the 1986 Commonwealth Games in Edinburgh, Scotland.

Pugh finished third during four consecutive years at the AAA Championships from 1986 to 1989.

She was an All-American thrower for the Arizona Wildcats track and field team, placing 8th in the discus at the 1990 NCAA Division I Outdoor Track and Field Championships.
