= 1925 WAAA Championships =

British athletics event

- Dates: 11 July
- Host city: London
- Venue: Stamford Bridge
- Level: Senior
- Type: Outdoor

The 1925 WAAA Championships were the national track and field championships for women in the United Kingdom.

The event was held at the Stamford Bridge, London, on 11 July 1925.

== Results ==
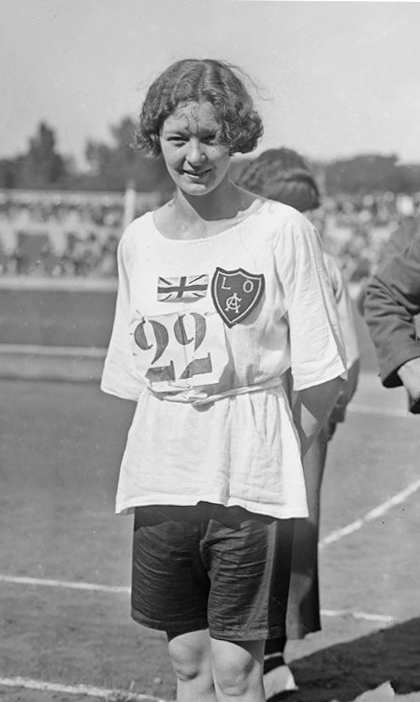
Hilda Hatt

Event	Gold		Silver		Bronze	
100 yards	Rose Thompson	11.8	Florence Haynes	1 yd	Nora Callebaut	inches
220 yards	Vera Palmer	26.8	Florence Haynes	1 yd	Violet Streater	3 yd
440 yards	Vera Palmer	61.4	Edith Trickey	3 yd	Violet Streater	inches
880 yards	Edith Trickey	2:26.6 =WR	Gladys Lane	5 yd	Kathleen Harris	3 yd
120 yards hurdles	Hilda Hatt	19.0	Peggy Batt	2 feet	E. L. Hutchings	1 foot
High jump	Phyllis Green	1.524 WR	Hilda Hatt	1.486	Sophie Eliott-Lynn	1.384
Long jump	Hilda Hatt	4.90	Margaret Hull	4.77	Sylvia Stone	4.68
Shot put	Mary Weston	17.70	Beatrice Manton	16.80	Florence Birchenough	15.31
Discus throw	Florence Birchenough	27.18 NR	E. Bell	24.34	Mary Weston	24.06
Two-Handed Javelin	Ivy Wilson	47.73	Sophie Eliott-Lynn	40.42	Louise Fawcett	39.84
880 yards walk	Florence Faulkner	4:15.0	Margaret Hegarty	30 yd	H. M. Birch	10 yd
660-yard relay	Manor Park; Rose Thompson; P Moeller; L.F. Gamble; W.Smith	1.19.2/5 WR	Middlesex A		London Olympiad	

== See also ==
- 1925 AAA Championships
