= Kathleen Tiffen =

British hurdler

Personal information
- Nationality: British (English)
- Born: 15 July 1912 Croydon, England
- Died: May 1986 (aged 73) Eastbourne, England
- Height: 177 cm (5 ft 10 in)
- Weight: 62 kg (137 lb)

Sport
- Sport: Track and field
- Event: hurdles
- Club: Mitcham AC

Kathleen Margaret Tiffen (15 July 1912 – May 1986) was a British hurdler who competed at the 1936 Summer Olympics.

== Biography ==
Tiffen finished third in consecutive 80 metres hurdles events at the AAA Championships; behind Hilda Hatt at the 1929 WAAA Championships and Muriel Cornell at the 1930 WAAA Championships. She improved to second place behind Elsie Green (who set a new world record time) at the 1931 WAAA Championships.

Tiffen continued to get beaten by her rival Elsie Green, finishing third at the 1934 WAAA Championships and second at the 1935 WAAA Championships.

At the 1936 Olympic Games in Berlin, She competed in the women's 80 metres hurdles competition.

Tiffen once again finished runner-up in the WAAA 80 metres hurdles, this time to Barbara Burke at the 1937 WAAA Championships.
