= Florence Birchenough =

British track and field athlete

Personal information
- Born: 13 January 1894 Acton Green, England
- Died: 3 July 1973 (aged 79)

Sport
- Sport: Athletics
- Event: shot put

Florence Ethel Birchenough (13 January 1894 – 3 July 1973) was a British track and field athlete, recognised as the first British woman to find international success in throwing events.

== Career ==
Born at Acton Green, then in Middlesex, she attended Haberdashers' Aske's School for Girls, then located on Creffield Road, Acton from 1905 until 1911, before joining the Regent Street Polytechnic, where she studied gymnastics and completed the British Association for Physical Training diploma, to qualify as a teacher of the sport. She began practising the discus, javelin and shot put, and as one of the first British women to do so, photographs of her demonstrating the events were used in Sophie Eliott-Lynn's 1925 book, Athletics for Women and Girls.

Birchenough's first international competition was the 1921 Women's Olympiad in Monte Carlo, where she formed part of a team representing the Polytechnic, and won the javelin competition. The following year, she was a founder of the Women's Amateur Athletic Association (WAAA) and in 1923 participated at the WAAA Championships, becoming the national shot put champion, at the inaugural 1923 WAAA Championships. The following year Birchenough became the national discus throw champion after winning won the inaugural WAAA Championships discus title at the 1924 WAAA Championships. She went on to retain the title four more times in 1925, 1926, 1927 and 1928.

Also in 1924, Birchenough participated in the 1924 Women's Olympiad taking the bronze medal in the discus throw. By 1927, she had at some point held the British record in all three of her events. She captained the British team at the 1926 Women's World Games.

Birchenough married Henry Jack Millichap in 1932 and remained involved in athletics as an official of the WAAA.
