= Athletics at the 1977 Summer Universiade – Women's discus throw =

The women's discus throw event at the 1977 Summer Universiade was held at the Vasil Levski National Stadium in Sofia on 22 August.

== Results ==
Rank	Athlete	Nationality	Result	Notes
1st place, gold medalist(s)	Mariya Vergova	Bulgaria	66.34	
2nd place, silver medalist(s)	Svetlana Melnikova	Soviet Union	61.78	
3rd place, bronze medalist(s)	Radostina Bakhchevanova	Bulgaria	61.08	
4	Brigitte Sander	East Germany	59.57	
5	Lyudmila Isayeva	Soviet Union	59.42	
6	Jane Haist	Canada	55.10	
7	Lucette Moreau	Canada	52.80	
8	Snikka Salminen	Finland	50.58	
9	Li Hsiao-hui	China	49.18	
10	Janet Thompson	Great Britain	48.54	
11	Stefanie Jagenbrein	Austria	44.30	
