= 1924 WAAA Championships =

British athletics event

- Dates: 28 June
- Host city: London
- Venue: Woolwich Stadium
- Level: Senior
- Type: Outdoor

The 1924 WAAA Championships were the second national track and field championships for women in the United Kingdom.

The event was held at the Woolwich Stadium on Woolwich Common, London, on 28 June 1924. The athletes competed in 12 events; up one event from the previous year with the addition of the discus throw.

== Results ==
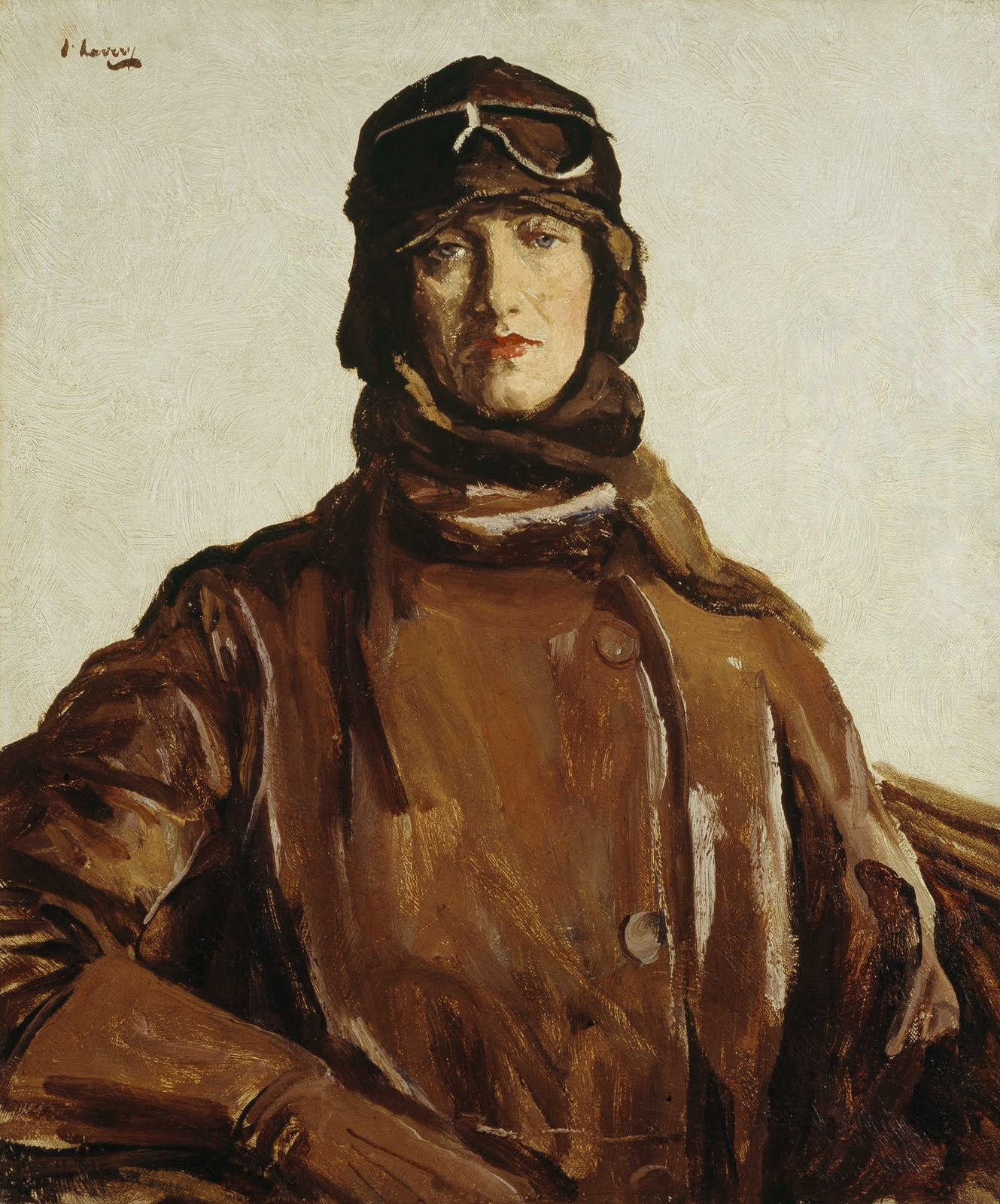
Sophie Eliott-Lynn

Event	Gold		Silver		Bronze	
100 yards	Eileen Edwards	11.3	Rose Thompson	1 yd	Mary Lines	inches
220 yards	Eileen Edwards	27.6	Vera Palmer	2 yd	Rose Thompson	2 yd
440 yards	Vera Palmer	65.2	Edith Trickey	67.4	Alice Cast	3 yd
880 yards	Edith Trickey	2:30.4	Phyllis Hall	2:41.8	Ivy Wilson	5 yd
120 yards hurdles	Mary Lines	18.4	Daisy Wright	5 yd	Peggy Batt	1 yd
High jump	Sophie Eliott-Lynn	1.448	Sylvia Stone	1.410	Ivy J. Lowman	1.397
Long jump	Mary Lines	5.17	Gladys Elliott	5.12	Sylvia Stone	4.84
Shot put	Mary Weston	16.17	Beatrice Manton	15.99	Florence Birchenough	15.61
Discus throw	Florence Birchenough	20.57 NR	Beatrice Manton	20.11	Sophie Eliott-Lynn	19.60
Two-Handed Javelin	Sophie Eliott-Lynn	52.78 NR	Ivy Wilson	38.52	Beatrice Manton	37.86
880 yards walk	Edith Trickey	4:17.4	Betty Keeling	15 yd	Florence Faulkner	5 yd
660-yard relay	London Olympiad	1.21.3/5				

== See also ==
- 1924 AAA Championships
