= Elsie Harris =

English high jumper

Personal information
- Nationality: British (English)

Sport
- Sport: Athletics
- Event: High jump
- Club: London Olympiades AC

Elsie Harris was a British track and field athlete.

== Biography ==
Harris was a member of the London Olympiades Athletic Club and finished third in the high jump at the 1930 WAAA Championships, held at Stamford Bridge on 16 August 1930.

She represented England at the 1934 British Empire Games in London, where she competed in the high jump event.
