= 1927 WAAA Championships =

British athletics event

- Dates: 9 July
- Host city: Reading
- Venue: Palmer Park
- Level: Senior
- Type: Outdoor

The 1927 WAAA Championships were the national track and field championships for women in the United Kingdom.

The event was held at the Palmer Park, Reading, Berkshire, on 9 July 1927. An additional discipline was contested, with two hurdles events over 75 metres and 100 yards being held.

== Results ==
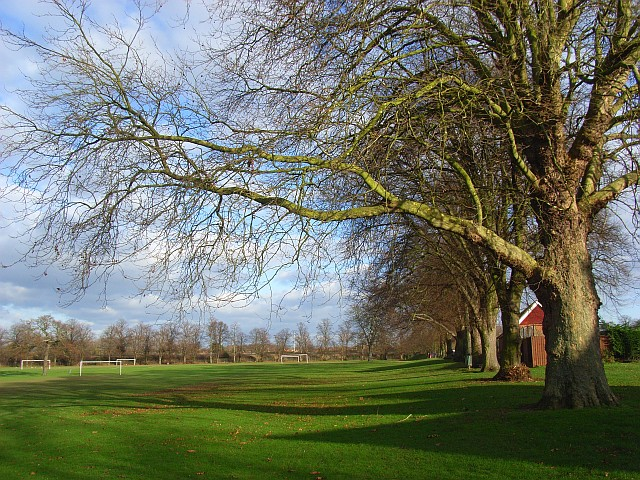
Palmer Park

| Event | Gold | | Silver | | Bronze | |
|---|---|---|---|---|---|---|
| 100 yards | Eileen Edwards | 11.4w | Florence Haynes | 1 yard | Daisy F. Ridgley | good third |
| 220 yards | Eileen Edwards | 25.8 =WR | Florence Haynes | 4 yards | Doris Uglow | 2 yards |
| 440 yards | Dorothy Proctor | 62.4 | Florence Haynes | 12 yards | Olive Clark | 6 yards |
| 880 yards | Edith Trickey | 2:32.4 | Alice Williams | 20 yards | Lilian Styles | 6 yard |
| 75 metres hurdles | Hilda Hatt | 12.6w | Peggy Batt | 3 yards | Elsie Green | |
| 100 yards hurdles | Muriel Gunn | 14.6w | Hilda Hatt | inches | Peggy Batt | fair third |
| High jump | Phyllis Green | 1.581 WR | Hilda Hatt; Barbara Holliday | 1.461; 1.46.1 | n/a | |
| Long jump | Muriel Gunn | 5.41 | Gladys Elliott | 4.80 | Hilda Hatt | 4.72 |
| Shot put | Florence Birchenough | 17.21 | Louise Fawcett | 16.04 | Marjorie Balchin | 14.90 |
| Discus throw | Florence Birchenough | 28.57 | Louise Fawcett | 26.58 | Roberta Hatcher | 25.17 |
| Two Handed Javelin | E. Willis | 41.35 | L. Hoare-Nairne | 39.95 | Louise Fawcett | 39.76 |
| 880 yards walk | Margaret Hegarty | 3:54.2 WR | H. Bates | 50 yards | Virna Horwood | 10 yards |
| 660-yard relay | Middlesex Ladies; Eileen Edwards; M. C. Beale; Dorothy Proctor; Vera Palmer | 1.18.3/5 | London Olympiad; Florence Haynes; G. M. Elliott; Doris Uglow; Daisy Ridgley | | Manor Park ? ? ? ? | |

== See also ==
- 1927 AAA Championships
