= 1984 WAAA Championships =

British athletics event

- Dates: 15–16 June
- Host city: London
- Venue: Crystal Palace National Sports Centre
- Level: Senior
- Type: Outdoor

The 1984 WAAA Championships sponsored by the Trustee Savings Bank, were the national track and field championships for women in the United Kingdom.

The event was held at the Crystal Palace National Sports Centre, London, from 15 to 16 June 1984.

== Results ==
Event	Gold		Silver		Bronze	
100 metres	Kathy Cook	11.44	Jayne Andrews	11.55	Sue Hearnshaw	11.66
200 metres	Kathy Cook	22.77	Bev Callender	23.18	Helen Barnett	23.25
400 metres	Tracy Lawton	52.74	Linda Keough	53.73	Carol Finlay	53.76
800 metres	(Australia) Heather Barralet	2:02.37	Christina Boxer	2:02.66	(Scotland) Anne Purvis	2:02.98
1,500 metres	Christine Benning	4:07.27	Gillian Green	4:07.90	Ruth Smeeth	4:10.76
3,000 metres	Debbie Peel	9:15.0	Carole Bradford	9:20.9	Shireen Samy	9:23.8
5,000 metres	Shireen Samy	16:10.10	Carol Haigh	16:21.83	Sue Crehan	16:26.58
10,000 metres	Priscilla Welch	34:00.5	Caroline Horne	35:15.9	Sue Crehan	35:48.3
marathon+	Priscilla Welch	2:30:06	Sarah Rowell	2:31:28	Véronique Marot	2:33:52
100 metres hurdles	Shirley Strong	12.96	Sally Gunnell	13.30	Lorna Boothe	13.31
400 metres hurdles	Gladys Taylor	56.78	Maureen Prendergast	57.49	(Scotland) Margaret Southerden	58.07
High jump	Diana Elliott	1.86	(Australia) Vanessa Browne	1.86	Louise Manning	1.83
Long jump	Sue Hearnshaw	6.79	Georgina Oladapo	6.52	Joyce Oladapo	6.40
Shot put	Judy Oakes	18.01	Myrtle Augee	17.10	Yvonne Hanson-Nortey	13.77
Discus throw	Lynda Whiteley	57.32	Karen Pugh	49.98	Janette Picton	47.20
Javelin	Fatima Whitbread	65.76	Sharon Gibson	60.58	(Scotland) Diane Royle	59.92
Heptathlon ++	Sarah Owen	5150	Madeleine Cropper	5099	Charmaine Johnson	4963
5,000 metres walk	Jill Barrett	23:51.63	Virginia Birch	24:09.96	Helen Elleker	24:28.76
10,000 metres walk	Helen Elleker	49:52.3	Brenda Lupton	50:10.2	Helen Ringshaw	51:31.2

- + 1984 London Marathon (Best placed British athletes)
- ++ Held on 8 & 9 September at Hendon

== See also ==
- 1984 AAA Championships
