= 1982 WAAA Championships =

British athletics event

- Dates: 30–31 July
- Host city: London
- Venue: Crystal Palace National Sports Centre
- Level: Senior
- Type: Outdoor

The 1982 WAAA Championships sponsored by the Trustee Savings Bank, were the national track and field championships for women in the United Kingdom.

The event was held at the Crystal Palace National Sports Centre, London, from 30 to 31 July 1982.

== Results ==
Event	Gold		Silver		Bronze	
100 metres	Wendy Hoyte	11.62	Sonia Lannaman	11.62	Heather Oakes	11.63
200 metres	Kathy Smallwood	23.00	Bev Callender	23.07	Helen Barnett	23.33
400 metres	(Wales) Michelle Scutt	51.05	Joslyn Hoyte-Smith	51.12	(Scotland) Linsey Macdonald	52.30
800 metres	(Australia) Terri Cater	2:01.54	(Australia) Heather Barralet	2:01.67	Lorraine Baker	2:01.86
1,500 metres	Christina Boxer	4:07.28	Kathryn Pilling	4:10.21	Gillian Dainty	4:10.35
3,000 metres	Debbie Peel	9:04.79	(Wales) Hilary Hollick	9:06.04	Gillian Dainty	9:10.63
5,000 metres	(Republic of Ireland) Monica Joyce	15:45.26	(Republic of Ireland) Regina Joyce	16:15.71	Julie Asgill	16:50.77
10,000 metres	Margaret Boddy	39:15.75	Sandra Lappage	39:18.95	Sue Lloyd	43:26.01
marathon+	Kathryn Binns	2:36:12	Carol Gould	2:37:53	Julie Barleycorn	2:43:28
100 metres hurdles	Shirley Strong	13.27	Judy Livermore	13.36	Lorna Boothe	13.37
400 metres hurdles	Sue Morley	57.31	Yvette Wray	57.52	Verona Elder	57.89
High jump	Barbara Simmonds	1.92	(Australia) Vanessa Browne	1.88	Judy Livermore	1.86
Long jump	(Australia) Robyn Strong	6.65	Sue Hearnshaw	6.26	(Wales) Gillian Regan	6.17
Shot put	Judy Oakes	17.59	Angela Littlewood	16.53	Caroline Savory	14.58
Discus throw	Janette Picton	51.06	Lesley Bryant	50.88	Vanessa Redford	49.50
Javelin	Fatima Whitbread	63.00	Sharon Gibson	58.68	Jeanette Rose	54.88
Heptathlon ++	Judy Livermore	5895	Kathy Warren	5618	Sarah Rowe	5541
5,000 metres walk	(Australia) Sue Cook	23:03.52	Irene Bateman	24:34.92	(Australia) Rachel Thompson	24:54.03
10,000 metres walk	Irene Bateman	48:57.6	Lillian Millen	51:06.1	Sarah Brown	52:10.4

- + Held on 12 June at Windsor
- ++ Held on 17 & 18 July at the Alexander Stadium

== See also ==
- 1982 AAA Championships
