= 1930 WAAA Championships =

British athletics event

- Dates: 16 August
- Host city: London
- Venue: Stamford Bridge
- Level: Senior
- Type: Outdoor

The 1930 WAAA Championships were the national track and field championships for women in the United Kingdom.

The event was held at Stamford Bridge, London, on 16 August 1930 and saw three world records established by Nellie Halstead, Gladys Lunn and Constance Mason.

== Results ==
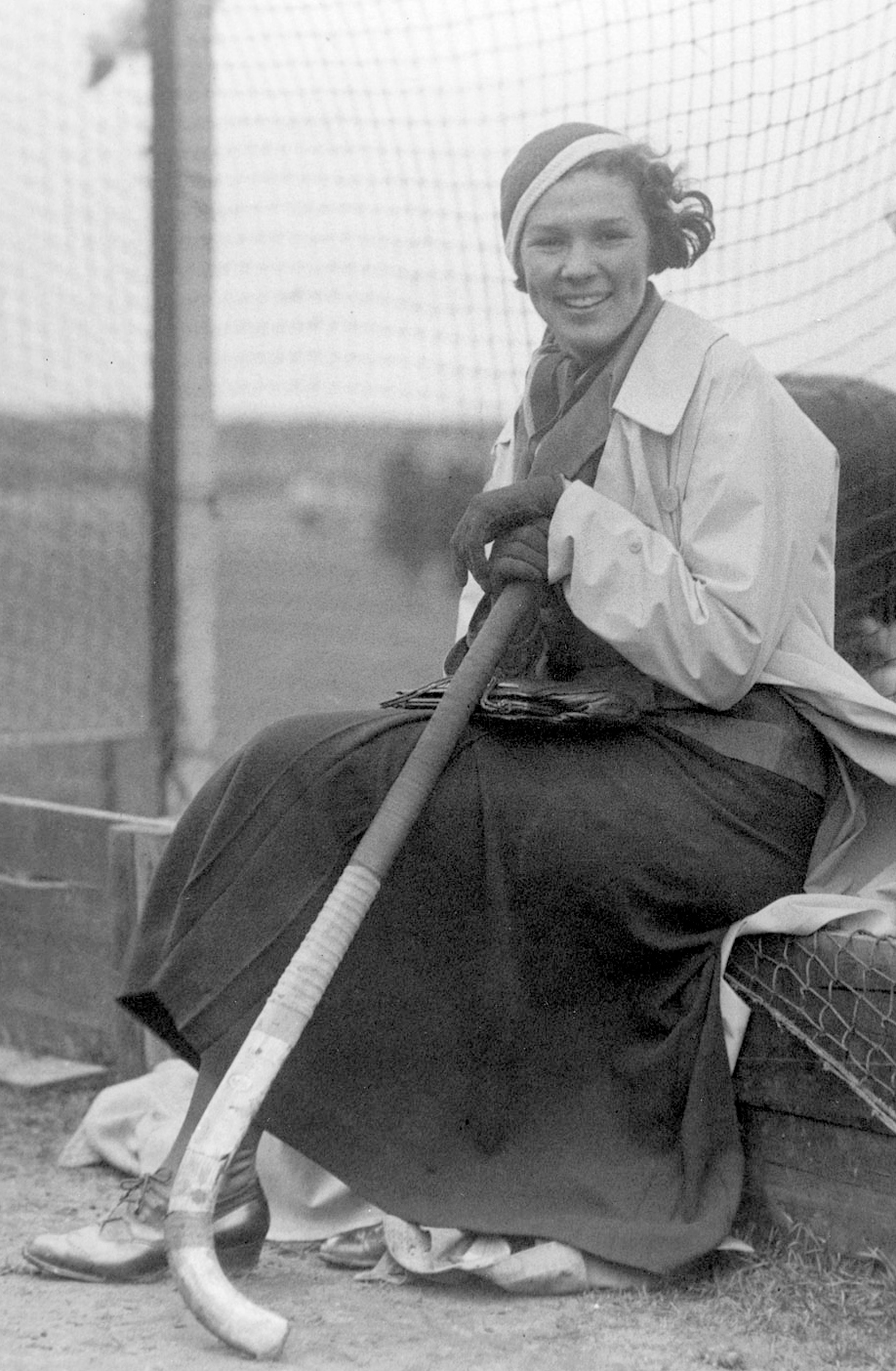
Dutch athlete Lien Gislof won the high jump

Event	Gold		Silver		Bronze	
100 yards	Eileen Hiscock	11.4 =NR	Daisy Ridgley	1½ yards	Ivy Walker	1 yard
220 yards	Nellie Halstead	25.2 WR	Eileen Hiscock	4 yards	Daisy Ridgley	1 foot
440 yards	Ellen Wright	59.8	Dorothy Butterfield	5 yards	Dorothea Fairley	1 yard
880 yards	Gladys Lunn	2:18.2 WR	Ruth Christmas	2:20.4	Lilian Styles	20 yards
80 metres hurdles	Muriel Cornell	12.4	Elsie Green	1 foot	Kathleen Tiffen	1 yard
High jump	(Netherlands) Carolina Gisolf	1.575	Mary Milne	1.549	Elsie Harris; Marjorie O'Kell	1.524; 1.524
Long jump	Muriel Cornell	5.63	Phyllis Bartholomew	5.35	Mary Seary	5.33
Shot put	Elsie Otway	8.88	Nellie Purvey	8.65	Irene Phillips	8.52
Discus throw	Louise Fawcett	29.30	Irene Phillips	27.63	Nellie Purvey	26.12
Javelin	(Netherlands) Leni Rombout	32.44	Nellie Purvey	28.45	Agnes Donnelly	26.67
1 mile walk	Constance Mason	8:14.4 WR	Lucy Howes	25 yards	W. Bell	5 yards

== See also ==
- 1930 AAA Championships
