= Julia Avis =

English discus thrower

Personal information
- Nationality: British (English)
- Born: 2 February 1963 (age 62) Hendon, Middlesex

Sport
- Sport: Athletics
- Event: discus throw
- Club: Barnet Ladies

Julia Mary Avis (born 2 February 1963) is a female former track and field athlete who competed for England in the discus throw.

== Biography ==
Avis a member of Barnet Ladies, finished third behind Lynda Whiteley in the discus throw event at the 1983 WAAA Championships.

Avis became the British discus throw champion after winning the British WAAA Championships title at the 1985 WAAA Championships. In addition she also won the 1985 UK Athletics Championships title.

Avis represented England in the discus event, at the 1986 Commonwealth Games in Edinburgh, Scotland.
