= Lesley Mallin =

English discus thrower

Personal information
- Nationality: British (English)
- Born: 1956 (age 68–69) Totnes, Devon, England

Sport
- Sport: Athletics
- Event: Discus throw
- Club: Torquay AC

Lesley Karen Mallin married name Lesley Bryant (born 1956), is a female former athlete who competed for England.

== Biography ==
Mallin finished third behind Meg Ritchie in the discus throw event at the 1975 WAAA Championships and third again behind Janet Thompson at the 1979 WAAA Championships.

Mallin represented England in the discus, at the 1978 Commonwealth Games in Edmonton, Alberta, Canada.

Mallin became the British discus throw champion after winning the British WAAA Championships title at the 1980 WAAA Championships.

Mallin married Ian Bryant in the Summer of 1981 and competed under her married name thereafter. As Lesley Bryant she represented England in the discus, at the 1982 Commonwealth Games in Brisbane, Queensland, Australia.
