= Kathryn Farr =

British discus thrower

Personal information
- Nationality: British (English)
- Born: Q2 1967 Southport, Lancashire, England

Sport
- Sport: Athletics
- Event: discus throw
- Club: Southport AC

Kathryn Olwen Farr (born Q2 1967) is a former track and field athlete who competed for England in the discus throw.

== Biography ==
Farr became the British discus throw champion after winning the British WAAA Championships title at the 1986 WAAA Championships.

Shortly afterwards, Farr represented England in the discus event, at the 1986 Commonwealth Games in Edinburgh, Scotland. The following year Farr won the 1987 UK Athletics Championships.
