= Paul Mardle =

English discus thrower

Personal information
- Born: 10 November 1962 (age 63) Norwich, England
- Height: 6 ft 4 in (1.93 m)
- Weight: 243 lb (110 kg)

Sport
- Sport: Athletics
- Event: discus throw
- Club: Wolverhampton & Bilston AC

Paul Stuart Mardle (born 10 November 1962) is a male former discus thrower who competed at the 1988 Summer Olympics.

== Biography ==
Mardle represented Great Britain at the 1988 Summer Olympics where he finished in 20th place in the discus event.

He was twice a representative of England at the Commonwealth Games in 1986 and 1990. He represented England finishing fourth, at the 1986 Commonwealth Games in Edinburgh, Scotland. Four years later he represented England finishing fifth, at the 1990 Commonwealth Games in Auckland, New Zealand.

Domestically, he won seven national titles including three AAA Championships titles (1987, 1988, 1989) and six UK Athletics Championships. By virtue of being the highest placed British athlete at the 1985 AAA Championships, he was also considered the British discus throw champion that year.

== Personal life ==
His son, Matthew Paul Rory Mardle, competed at the Inter Schools Championship in 2009 under Paul's tuition, coming second.

== National titles ==
- UK Championships: 1984, 1985, 1987, 1988, 1990, 1991
- AAA Championships: 1987, 1988, 1989
