= 1983 WAAA Championships =

British athletics event

- Dates: 29–30 July
- Host city: London
- Venue: Crystal Palace National Sports Centre
- Level: Senior
- Type: Outdoor

The 1983 WAAA Championships sponsored by the Trustee Savings Bank, were the national track and field championships for women in the United Kingdom.

The event was held at the Crystal Palace National Sports Centre, London, from 29 to 30 July 1983.

== Results ==
Event	Gold		Silver		Bronze	
100 metres	Kathy Cook	11.26	Heather Oakes	11.37	Bev Callender	11.44
200 metres	(Wales) Michelle Scutt	23.17	Helen Barnett	23.26	Jane Parry	23.54
400 metres	(Australia) Denise Boyd	51.62	Joslyn Hoyte-Smith	52.98	Gladys Taylor	53.35
800 metres	Shireen Bailey	2:00.58	(Scotland) Anne Purvis	2:00.74	Christina Boxer	2:00.91
1,500 metres	Gillian Green	4:12.53	Kathryn Carter	4:13.93	Debbie Peel	4:14.00
3,000 metres	Debbie Peel	9:11.34	Lynne Harvey	9:15.10	(Wales) Susan Tooby	9:17.56
5,000 metres	Paula Fudge	16:23.06	Marina Samy	16:32.30	Sally McDiarmid	16:36.97
10,000 metres	Barbara King	35:19.86	Sally McDiarmid	35:40.80	Jane Holmes	36:43.33
marathon+	Glynis Penny	2:36:21	Kathryn Binns	2:38:11	Sarah Rowell	2:39:11
100 metres hurdles	Shirley Strong	12.95 NR	Lorna Boothe	13.17	(Scotland) Pat Rollo	13.35
400 metres hurdles	Yvette Wray	57.82	(Republic of Ireland) Mary Barnwell	58.50	(Wales) Diane Fryar	58.77
High jump	Gillian Evans	1.91	(Japan) Megumi Sato	1.88	(Northern Ireland) Janet Boyle	1.85
Long jump	(Australia) Robyn Lorraway	6.74	Joyce Oladapo	6.55	Kim Hagger	6.38
Shot put	Judy Oakes	17.61	(Republic of Ireland) Marita Walton	15.41	Myrtle Augee	14.44
Discus throw	Lynda Whiteley	53.88	(Republic of Ireland) Patricia Walsh	52.22	Julia Avis	50.62
Javelin	Fatima Whitbread	65.24	(Japan) Emi Matsui	55.88	Sharon Gibson	53.60
Heptathlon ++	Judy Livermore	5940	Kim Hagger	5842	Kathy Warren	5509
5,000 metres walk	(Canada) Ann Peel	24:26.04	Jill Barrett	25:20.73	Helen Elleker	25:54.62
10,000 metres walk	Irene Bateman	48:52.5	Jill Barrett	50:11.2	Brenda Lupton	51:13.1

- + 1983 London Marathon (Best placed British athletes)
- ++ Held on 16 & 17 July at the Alexander Stadium

== See also ==
- 1983 AAA Championships
