= 1979 WAAA Championships =

British athletics event

- Dates: 27–28 July
- Host city: London
- Venue: Crystal Palace National Sports Centre
- Level: Senior
- Type: Outdoor

The 1979 WAAA Championships sponsored by Sunsilk, were the national track and field championships for women in the United Kingdom.

The event was held at the Crystal Palace National Sports Centre, London, from 27 to 28 July 1979.

The marathon and 10,000 walk events were introduced to the Championships for the first time.

== Results ==
Event	Gold		Silver		Bronze	
100 metres	Heather Hunte	11.58	Kathy Smallwood	11.58	Bev Goddard	11.64
200 metres	Kathy Smallwood	23.39	Bev Goddard	23.40	Heather Hunte	23.85
400 metres	Joslyn Hoyte-Smith	51.90	Verona Elder	52.78	Dianne Clarke	52.98
800 metres	Christine Benning	2:01.24	Janet Prictoe	2:01.66	Liz Barnes	2:02.84
1,500 metres	Mary Stewart	4:14.78	Ruth Smeeth	4:15.45	Glynis Penny	4:15.67
3,000 metres	(Republic of Ireland) Deirdre Nagle	9:13.24	Kathryn Binns	9:13.34	(New Zealand) Barbara Moore	9:15.92
marathon+	Joyce Smith	2:41:37	Gillian Adams	2:43:08	Carol Gould	2:44:30
100 metres hurdles	Shirley Strong	13.67	(Israel) Esther Rot	13.71	Lorna Boothe	14.01
400 metres hurdles	Christine Warden	56.06 NR	(Republic of Ireland) Mary Appleby	57.87	Diane Heath	58.35
High jump	Barbara Simmonds	1.81	Ann-Marie Devally	1.78	three–way tie^	1.73
Long jump	Sue Hearnshaw	6.55	Allison Manley	6.41	Gladys Taylor	6.24
Shot put	Judy Oakes	16.38	(Wales) Venissa Head	16.35	Angela Littlewood	15.43
Discus throw	Janet Thompson	53.56	(Republic of Ireland) Patricia Walsh	51.12	Lesley Mallin	48.88
Javelin	Tessa Sanderson	61.82	Fatima Whitbread	56.66	(Wales) Jacqueline Zaslona	50.74
Pentathlon ++	Marcia Marriott	3897	Judy Livermore	3738	Kim Hagger	3683
5,000 metres walk	Marion Fawkes	23:31.5 NR	Carol Tyson	23:57.0	Irene Bateman	24:21.9
10,000 metres walk	Marion Fawkes	48:37.6 NR	Irene Bateman	49:05.0	Judy Farr	51:18.0

- + Held on 17 June at Sandbach
- ++ Held on 16 June at the Alexander Stadium

^ Three–way tie between Tonia Philpots, Lesley Chilton & Sharon McPeake

== See also ==
- 1979 AAA Championships
