= 1978 WAAA Championships =

British athletics event

- Dates: 18–19 August
- Host city: London
- Venue: Crystal Palace National Sports Centre
- Level: Senior
- Type: Outdoor

The 1978 WAAA Championships sponsored by Sunsilk were the national track and field championships for women in the United Kingdom.

The event was held at the Crystal Palace National Sports Centre, London, from 18 to 19 August 1978.

The 10,000 walk event was introduced to the Championships for the first time and the marathon was also added as a WAAA title but as with the pentathlon was contested elsewhere.

== Results ==
Event	Gold		Silver		Bronze	
100 metres	Kathy Smallwood	11.66	Heather Hunte	11.79	Sharon Colyear	11.79
200 metres	Kathy Smallwood	23.24	Donna Hartley	23.42	Eleanor Thomas	23.79
400 metres	Joslyn Hoyte	52.66	Verona Elder	53.40	Linda McCurry	54.01
800 metres	Christina Boxer	2:03.10	Janet Prictoe	2:03.11	Denise Kiernan	2:05.86
1,500 metres	Cherry Hanson	4:11.62	Glynis Penny	4:12.45	Wendy Smith	4:13.40
3,000 metres	Christine Benning	8:52.33 NR	Ann Ford	8:53.80	(New Zealand) Alison Wright	9:14.72
marathon+	Margaret Lockley	2:55:08	Margaret Thompson	3:16:15	(Scotland) Leslie Watson	3:18:46
100 metres hurdles	Sharon Colyear	13.51	Shirley Strong	13.68	Yvette Wray	14.03
400 metres hurdles	(Republic of Ireland) Mary Appleby	57.46	(Scotland) Liz Sutherland	58.36	Sue Smith	59.14
High jump	Carol Mathers	1.76	Diana Elliott	1.76	six–way tie^	1.71
Long jump	Jill Davies	6.19	(Wales) Ruth Howell	6.18	Carol Earlington	6.17
Shot put	Angela Littlewood	15.97	Vanessa Redford	14.56	Janet Thompson	14.54
Discus throw	Janet Thompson	49.80	(Republic of Ireland) Patricia Walsh	47.28	Angela Littlewood	46.22
Javelin	Anne Farquhar	49.20	Jeanette Rose	48.30	Fatima Whitbread	47.54
Pentathlon ++	Yvette Wray	4140	Sue Mapstone	4121	Gillian Evans	4070
5,000 metres walk	Carol Tyson	24:08.2	Virginia Lovell	25:06.4	Karen Eden	25:46.6
10,000 metres walk	Carol Tyson	49:59.0 NR	Marion Fawkes	50:31.0	Judy Farr	50:46.0

- + Held on 20 May at Ryde
- ++ Held on 18 June at the Alexander Stadium

^ Six–way tie between Karen Chaytors, Louise Miller, Tonia Philpots, Ann-Marie Devally, Deborah Grant & Alyson Thomson

== See also ==
- 1978 AAA Championships
