= Muriel Cornell =

British athlete

Muriel Cornell (née Gunn)
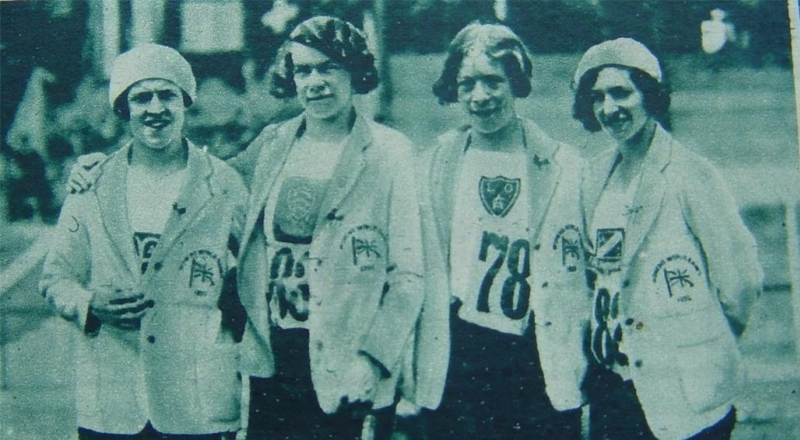
- Muriel Cornell (first on the right )

Personal information
- Born: 27 September 1906 Mitcham, Surrey, United Kingdom
- Died: 12 March 1996 (aged 89) Redhill, Surrey, United Kingdom

Sport
- Sport: Athletics
- Events: Long jump; 100 yards; 80 m hurdles; 100 m hurdles
- Club: Mitcham Athletic Club
Medal record
Representing Great Britain
Women's World Games
Silver medal – second place	1926 Gothenburg	Long jump
Silver medal – second place	1930 Prague	Long jump

Muriel Amy Cornell (née Gunn; 27 September 1906 – 8 March 1996) was a British athlete and world record holder for the long jump.

== Biography ==
Cornell was born in 1906 in Mitcham, then part of Surrey, to Frederick William Gunn and Beatrice Minnie, née Loosemore. She married Stanley Herbert Cornell, a brush manufacturer, in August 1928.

She became a founder member of the ladies' section of Mitcham Athletic Club in 1926 at the age of 19. At the British Games in London in August, she broke the long jump world record with a distance of 5.485 m. Later in August, she competed at the 1926 Women's World Games in Gothenburg at which she placed second, recording 5.44 m, behind Japan's Kinue Hitomi. Cornell exceeded Hitomi's world record jump of 5.5 m, but she left a mark in the sand after she turned to speak to an official before leaving the pit.

Cornell again became the world record holder in August 1927, jumping 5.575 m, which she held until Hitomi jumped 5.98 m in 1928. The long jump did not feature at the 1928 Summer Olympics, the first games with events for women, and Cornell didn't complete. During 1928 she broke the world record for the 80 metres hurdles.

At a match against Germany in Birmingham in 1930, Cornell set a British record of 5.80 metres (19 feet 0 inches), becoming the first 19 ft jump by a European. The British record stood for 23 years until 1952. The 1930 Women's World Games in Prague saw Cornell place in second again to Hitomi.

In 1927, competing as Muriel Gunn, she became the national 100 yards hurdles champion and the national long jump champion after winning the British WAAA Championships titles at the 1927 WAAA Championships.

Shortly before her marriage, Gunn won further WAAA Championship titles in the 100 yards and long jump at the 1928 WAAA Championships. Then competing under the name Cornell she retained the long jump title at both the 1929 WAAA Championships and 1930 WAAA Championships, in addition to regaining the Sprint hurdles title in 1930. At the 1931 WAAA Championships she won her fifth consecutive long jump crown.

A snapped Achilles tendon in 1934 ended her career as an athlete, however she continued her involvement with the sport. She served as honorary secretary of the Women's Amateur Athletic Association for 11 years, and was organising secretary for the Women's World Games and women's events at the Empire Games both staged in London in 1934. She also managed the women's team at the 1936 Summer Olympics in Berlin and helped to establish a national coaching scheme after World War II.

Cornell died of pneumonia on 8 March 1996 in Redhill, Surrey. She was posthumously inducted into the England Athletics Hall of Fame in 2014.
