= 1926 WAAA Championships =

British athletics event

- Dates: 19 June
- Host city: London
- Venue: Stamford Bridge
- Level: Senior
- Type: Outdoor

The 1926 WAAA Championships were the national track and field championships for women in the United Kingdom.

The event was held at the Stamford Bridge, London, on 19 June 1926.

== Results ==
Louise Fawcett

Event	Gold		Silver		Bronze	
100 yards	Florence Haynes	12.0	Rose Thompson	inches	Madge Wannop	inches
220 yards	Vera Palmer	26.8	Florence Haynes	2 yards	Dorothy Proctor	2 yards
440 yards	Vera Palmer	61.8	Dorothy Proctor	1½ yards	Violet Streater	1½ yards
880 yards	Edith Trickey	2:28.0	Gladys Lane	4 yards	Lilian Styles	6 yards
120 yards hurdles	Hilda Hatt	18.2	Edith White	inches	Peggy Batt	2 yards
High jump	Phyllis Green	1.473	Barbara Holliday	1.435	Ruby Tonge	1.422
Long jump	Phyllis Green	5.03	Josephine Matthews	4.93	Margaret Hull	4.81
Shot put	Florence Birchenough	16.78	Louise Fawcett	15.89	Rina Vannozzi	13.05
Discus throw	Florence Birchenough	27.92	Louise Fawcett	26.83	Marjorie Balchin	24.75
Two-Handed Javelin	Louise Fawcett	49.18	Ivy Wilson	37.90	Sylvia Stone	37.84
880 yards walk	Daisy Crossley	4:06.0	Margaret Hegarty		J. M. Parsons	
660-yard relay	London Olympiades AC; S. C. Haynes; K. M. Hayward; Eileen Edwards; Nora Callebout	1.21.2/5				

== See also ==
- 1926 AAA Championships
