= 1975 WAAA Championships =

British athletics event

- Dates: 18–19 July
- Host city: London
- Venue: Crystal Palace National Sports Centre
- Level: Senior
- Type: Outdoor

The 1975 WAAA Championships were the national track and field championships for women in the United Kingdom.

The event was held at the Crystal Palace National Sports Centre, London, from 18 to 19 July 1975.

The 3,500 metres walk was increased in distance to 5,000 metres.

== Results ==
Event	Gold		Silver		Bronze	
100 metres	Andrea Lynch	11.68	(Australia) Denise Robertson	11.94	Gladys Taylor	12.09
200 metres	(Scotland) Helen Golden	24.17	Gladys Taylor	24.43	Wendy Clarke	24.48
400 metres	Donna Murray	51.88	Verona Elder	53.21	Liz Barnes	53.43
800 metres	Angela Creamer	2:05.14	(Canada) Abby Hoffman	2:06.67	(Republic of Ireland) Pat O'Dwyer	2:07.74
1500 metres	Mary Stewart	4:14.73	(South Africa) Sonia Laxton	4:15.15	(Wales) Hilary Hollick	4:15.89
3000 metres	(Republic of Ireland) Mary Purcell	9:08.00	(Scotland) Christine Haskett	9:18.32	Ann Yeoman	9:19.86
100 metres hurdles	(Canada) Liz Damman	13.93	Lorna Boothe	14.00	(Israel) Esther Rot	14.09
400 metres hurdles	Jannette Roscoe	58.31 NR	Jackie Stokoe	58.55	Diane Heath	59.00
High jump	Denise Brown	1.79 jo	Ros Few	1.78 jo	Barbara Lawton	1.75
Long jump	(Scotland) Myra Nimmo	6.30	(South Africa) Maryna Meyer	6.17	Sue Reeve	6.14
Shot put	Brenda Bedford	14.89	Janis Kerr	14.48	(Wales) Venissa Head	14.20
Discus throw	(Scotland) Meg Ritchie	53.12	Janet Thompson	51.52	Lesley Mallin	47.74
Javelin	Tessa Sanderson	54.40	Sharon Corbett	48.82	Janeen King	47.18
Pentathlon +	Sue Wright	4196	Ann Wilson	4070	Hazel Oakes	4049
5000 metres walk	Virginia Lovell	25:02.8	Marion Fawkes	25:14.8	Judy Farr	25:24.4

+ Held on 25 May at Crystal Palace

== See also ==
- 1975 AAA Championships
