= Mary, Lady Heath =

Irish aviator

Sophie Mary Peirce-Evans Sophie Mary Eliott-Lynn Mary, Lady Heath
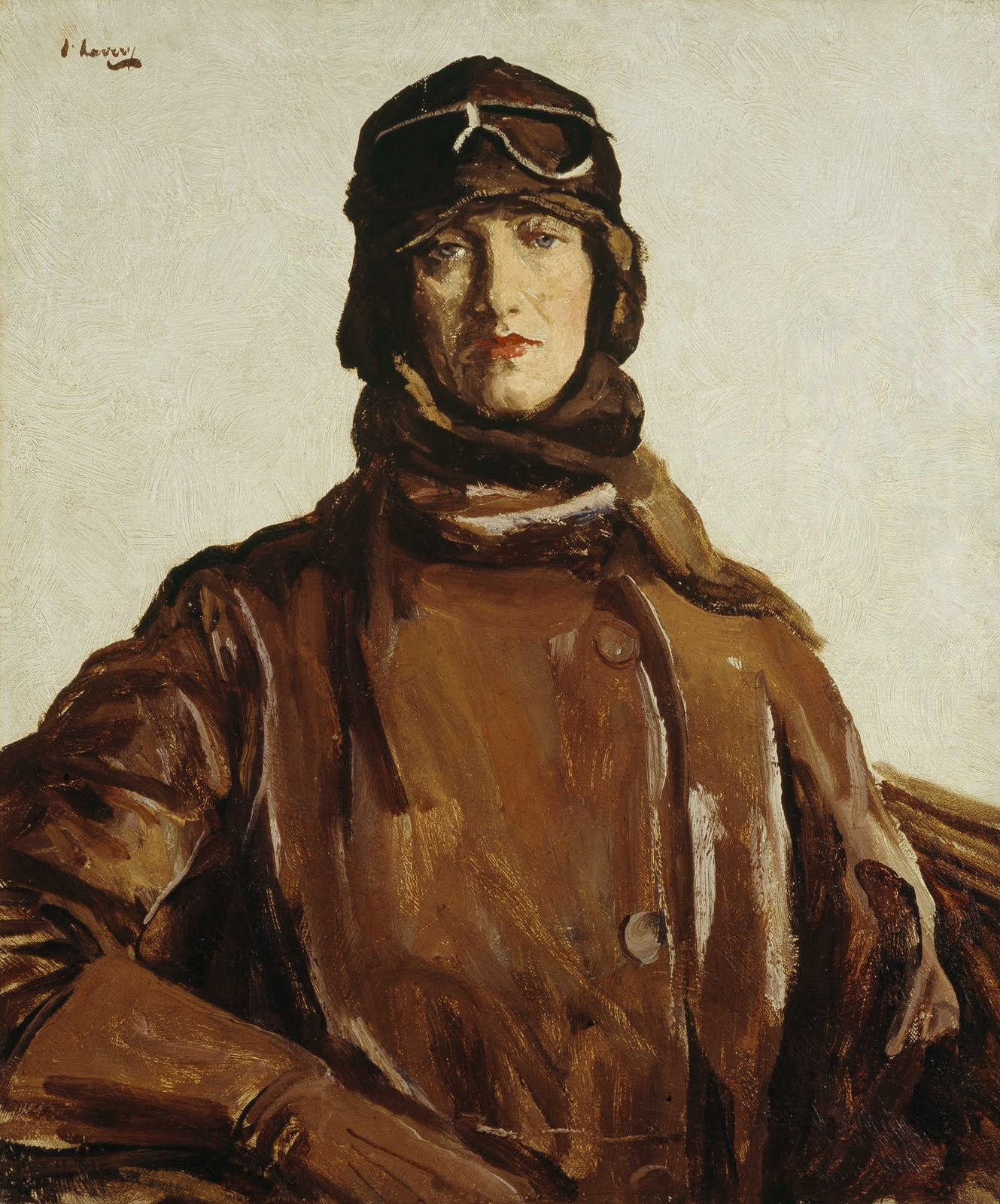
- Peirce-Evans, as depicted in a painting by John Lavery entitled An Irish Airwoman
- Born: Sophie Catherine Theresa Mary Peirce-Evans; 17 November 1896; Knockaderry, County Limerick
- Died: 9 May 1939 (aged 42); St Leonards's Hospital, Shoreditch, London
- Resting place: Surrey

Mary, Lady Heath (Note: She is often incorrectly referred to as "Lady Mary Heath". The title "Lady" before the Christian name is borne by daughters of dukes, marquesses and earls but she derived hers from her husband's baronetcy, so she should be called "Lady Heath") (17 November 1896 – 9 May 1939) was an Irish aviator and sportswoman. Born Sophie Catherine Theresa Mary Peirce-Evans in Knockaderry, County Limerick, near the town of Newcastle West. She was one of the best-known women in the world for a five-year period from the mid-1920s.

== Early life ==
When Sophie Peirce-Evans was one year old, her father John Peirce-Evans, bludgeoned her mother Kate Theresa Dooling to death with a heavy stick. He was found guilty of murder and declared insane. His daughter was taken to the home of her grandfather in Newcastle West, County Limerick where she was brought up by two maiden aunts, who discouraged her passion for sports.

After schooldays in Rochelle School, Cork; Princess Garden Belfast and St Margaret's Hall on Mespil Road in Dublin, where she played hockey and tennis, Sophie enrolled in the Royal College of Science for Ireland on Merrion Street (now Government Buildings).

The college was designed to produce the educated farmers which the country then needed. Sophie, one of the few women in the college, duly took a top-class degree in science, specialising in agriculture. She also played with the college hockey team and contributed to a student magazine, copies of which are held in the National Library of Ireland. After getting her degree, she moved to Kenya with her first husband, William Elliot-Lynn. In 1925, she published a book of poetry called East African Nights.

She was a Soroptimist and a Founder Member of SI Greater London, which was chartered in 1923.

== Careers ==
=== Athletics ===
Before becoming a pilot, Lady Heath had already made her mark. During World War I, she spent two years as a despatch rider, based in England and later France, where she had her portrait painted by Sir John Lavery. By then, she had married the first of her three husbands and as Sophie Mary Eliott-Lynn, was one of the founders of the Women's Amateur Athletic Association after her move from her native Ireland to London in 1922, following a brief sojourn in Aberdeen.

In 1922, she finished second behind Sylvia Stone in the national high jump. The following year Eliott-Lynn became the national javelin (two handed) champion, after winning the WAAA Championships title at the 1923 WAAA Championships. She also finished second in the 120 yards hurdles and third in the shot put.

She set a disputed world record for the high jump. In 1923 she represented the United Kingdom at the 1923 Women's Olympiad in Monte Carlo, during the games she came third place at the high jump, javelin throw and the Women's pentathlon. In 1924 she participated in the 1924 Women's Olympiad winning the silver medal in the long jump. Also in 1924, she won the high jump and javelin AAA titles at the 1924 WAAA Championships.

In 1925, she published a coaching manual Athletics for women and girls, which advised on basic training and was also a delegate to the International Olympic Committee, the same year that she took her first flying lessons. In 1926 she again represented the United Kingdom at javelin at the 1926 Women's World Games in Gothenburg, coming fourth, with a throw of 44.63 metres.

In 1928, Lady Heath represented England as a judge in the 1928 Summer Olympics, the first Olympics in which women's athletics were included.

=== Aviation career ===
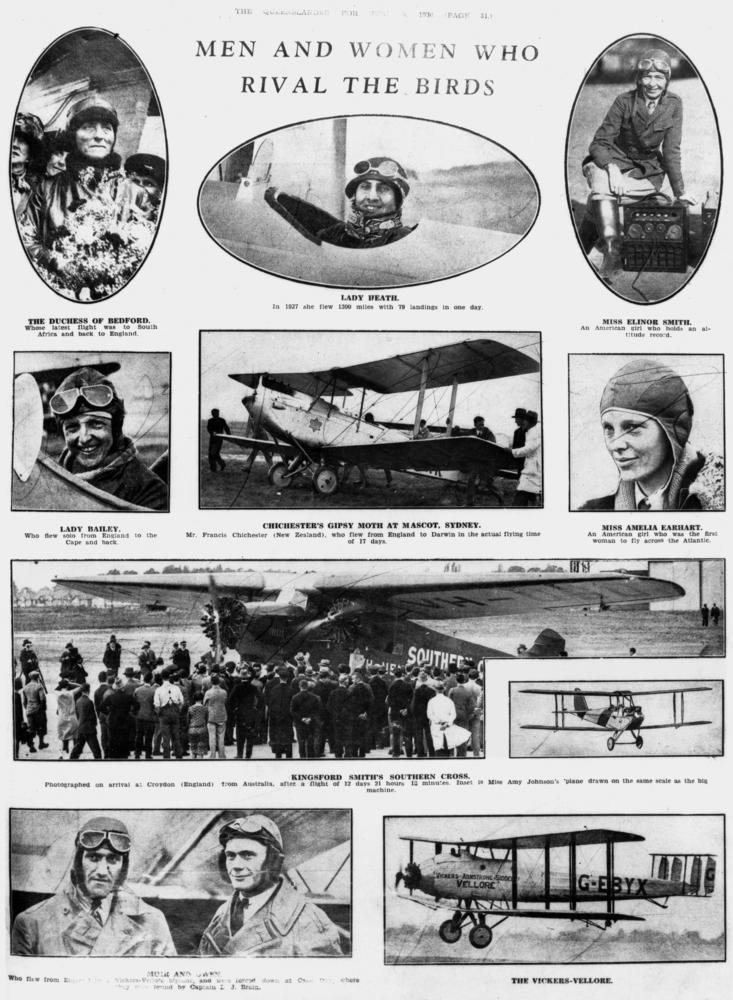
Mary Lady Heath (atop centre)

In 1929 Lady Heath became the first woman to hold a commercial flying licence in Britain, set records for altitude in a small plane and later a Shorts seaplane and was the first woman to parachute from an aeroplane (landing in the middle of a football match). After her flight from the Cape, she became the first woman to gain a mechanic's qualification in the United States.

At the time she was regarded as one of the world's leading aviators, along with the likes of Charles Lindbergh and Amelia Earhart. By 1927 she had three aircraft: an Avro Avian (registration G-EBQL), a de Havilland Moth (G-EBMV) and an S.E.5a (G-EBPA). "Britain's Lady Lindy," as she was known in the United States, made front-page news as the first pilot, male or female, to fly a small open-cockpit aircraft from Cape Town to London (Croydon Aerodrome). She had thought it would take her three weeks but it actually took her three months, from January to May 1928.

A scale model of the plane used by Lady Heath is on display at The Little Museum of Dublin. She wrote about the experience later in a book Woman and Flying, that she co-wrote with Stella Wolfe Murray. In July 1928 she spent a few weeks volunteering as a co-pilot with a civil airline, KLM. She was hoping to be appointed to the newly created Batavia route, which would have made her the first woman pilot with a commercial airline. The world was not ready for female pilots and her hope was not fulfilled.

Just when her fame was at its height, with her life a constant whirl of lectures, races and long-distance flights, Lady Heath (she had married the 75-year old Sir James Heath in October 1927) was badly injured in a crash just before the National Air Races in Cleveland, Ohio in 1929. Before her accident Lady Heath applied for American citizenship, intending to remain in the USA where she had made a good living on the lecture circuit and as an agent for Cirrus Engines. Lady Heath was never the same after her accident.

After divorce in Reno, Nevada, from Heath in 1930, she returned to Ireland with her third husband G.A.R. Williams, a horseman and pilot of Caribbean origin, and became involved in private aviation, briefly running her own company at Kildonan, near Dublin in the mid-1930s, and helping produce the generation of pilots that would help establish the national airline Aer Lingus.

== Records ==
- Light aircraft height record: 16,000 ft, May 1927 with Lady Bailey
- All metal light seaplane height: 13,400 ft (reaching it in 1 hour 32 min) in the Short Mussel on 14 July 1928 with Sicele O'Brien (the second woman to hold a commercial licence in Ireland and UK ) as passenger
- Light aircraft height 23,000 ft, replacing previous holder Geoffrey de Havilland (20,000 ft)
- First solo flight from a Dominion to UK and first female pilot from Capetown to London Feb-May 1928

== Family life ==
=== Marriages ===
Lady Heath's first marriage was to Major William Eliot Lynn after which she was well known as Mrs Eliot Lynn. She divorced her husband, alleging cruelty and after he died in London in early 1927, married Sir James Heath on 11 October 1927 at Christ Church in Mayfair, London. In January 1930 she filed for a divorce from Heath in Reno, Nevada, United States and was awarded a decree nisi in May of the same year.

On 12 November 1931, she married G.A.R. Williams in Lexington, Kentucky, United States.

=== Death ===
On 9 May 1939, aged 42, she died in St Leonard's Hospital, Shoreditch, London following a fall inside a double-decker tram. At the inquest the conductor gave evidence that she was sitting on the top deck and she seemed "very vague"; another passenger commented to the conductor that "I think the lady is asleep", before she fell down the stairs and hit her head on the driver's controller box. In the previous years, with alcoholism now a serious problem, she had left Ireland and her husband for England and had made a number of appearances in court on charges relating to drunkenness.

A pathologist said he found no evidence of alcohol but detailed evidence of an old blood clot which may have caused the fall; the jury returned a verdict of accidental death. On 15 May 1939, according to newspaper reports, her ashes were scattered over Surrey from an aircraft flown by her estranged husband from Croydon Airport although legend has it that her ashes were returned to Ireland where they were scattered over her native Newcastle West.

== In popular culture ==
In 2013, aviator Tracey Curtis-Taylor retraced Lady Heath's 1928 South Africa to England flight in a biplane. The flight was the subject of a BBC documentary, which included details and photographs of Lady Heath's original flight.

'The Sky Is Not Enough' by June O'Sullivan. A historical novel based on Sophie's solo flight from Cape Town to London. ISBN 978-1-78199-653-9

== See also ==
- Iona National Airways
- List of people on the postage stamps of Ireland
- Mary Bailey (aviator)
