= Janette Picton =

English discus thrower

Personal information
- Nationality: British (English)
- Born: 4 March 1963 (age 62) Eton, England

Sport
- Sport: Athletics
- Event: discus
- Club: Bracknell Athletics Club

Janette Picton (born 4 March 1963), is a female former athlete who competed for England.

== Biography ==
Picton became the British discus throw champion after winning the British WAAA Championships title at the 1982 WAAA Championships.

Picton represented England in the discus, at the 1982 Commonwealth Games in Brisbane, Australia.

Picton won a second discus AAA title at the 1989 AAA Championships and the following year represented England in the discus event, at the 1990 Commonwealth Games in Auckland, New Zealand.

After she retired from the discus event she took up marathon running in 1993 and finished in 32nd place during the 1994 London Marathon.
