= James Nesbitt (athlete) =

British discus thrower

Personal information
- Nationality: British (Northern Irish)
- Born: 22 September 1913 County Monaghan, Ireland
- Died: October 1992

Sport
- Sport: Athletics
- Event: Discus throw
- Club: Royal Ulster Constabulary AC

James E. Nesbitt (22 September 1913 – October 1992) was a British/Irish athlete who competed at the 1948 Summer Olympics.

== Biography ==
Nesbitt was a constable with the Royal Ulster Constabulary and won the Northern Ireland discus throw title 12 times between 1935 and 1950.

Nesbitt finished second behind Jim Miggins in the decathlon event at the 1937 AAA Championships and finished third behind Nikolaos Syllas in the discus event at the 1939 AAA Championships before his career was interrupted by World War II.

After the war Nesbitt finished second behind Jan Brasser at both the 1946 AAA Championships and 1947 AAA Championships.

Nesbitt represented the Great Britain team at the 1948 Olympic Games in London in the men's discus throw competition.
