= Louise Fawcett =

British javelin and discus thrower

- circa.1926 Polytechnic of Central London

Personal information
- Nationality: British
- Born: 1904
- Died: 1990 (aged 85–86)

Sport
- Sport: Athletics
- Event(s): Javelin throw, discus throw
- Club: London Olympiades AC
- Retired: yes

Achievements and titles
- World finals: 1926 Women's World Games - silver, javelin
- Regional finals: Middlesex County Javelin Champion 1931 - 35 Middlesex County Javelin Champion 1931 - 33 Middlesex County Discus Champion 1931 - 33
- National finals: British Javelin Champion 1926, 1931; British Discus Champion 1930

Louise Fawcett (1904−1990) was a British javelin and discus thrower.

== Biography ==
Fawcett was educated at Hammersmith Technical School As a member of the British Athletic Team she participated in a number of international competitions including the Fédération Sportive Féminine Internationale second Women's World Games in Sweden (1926), in Brussels (1927), England, Prague, Berlin (1930), Birmingham, London and Barcelona (1936).

Fawcett finished third behind Ivy Wilson in the javelin event at the 1925 WAAA Championships but the following year would become the national javelin champion after winning the WAAA Championships title at the 1926 WAAA Championships. Further WAAA titles were won at the 1930 Championships (discus) and the 1931 Championships (javelin).

She married Leslie Leon Stenning in 1937 and while living at Claremont Cottage, St Mary's Terrace, they had a child called Lorraine Elizabeth Stenning in 1938.

== Achievements ==
- Fédération Sportive Féminine Internationale Women's World Games: silver at javelin throw
- English Championship Javelin Record 1926 & 1931
- English Championship Discus Record 1930
- Middlesex County Javelin Championship 1931 - 33
- Middlesex County Discus Championship 1931 - 33
- British Javelin Champion 1926 - 31
- British Javelin Record Holder 1926 - 30 (103 ft 7in or 49.1744m)
- British Discus Champion 1930
- British Discus Record Holder 1930 - 33 (106 ft 11 1/2in or 61.5188m)
- Middlesex County Javelin Record Holder 1931 - 34
- Middlesex County Discus Champion 1931 - 35
- Middlesex County Discus Record Holder 1931 - 35
- Middlesex County Shot Put Champion 1934 - 35
- Second in Women's Amateur Athletic Association Indoor Shot Put Championship 1935 - 36
- Southern Counties Javelin Champion 1932 - 34
- Southern Counties Javelin Record Holder 1932 - 34
- Southern Counties Discus Champion 1935
- Southern Counties Discus Record Holder 1935
- Middlesex Championships 1936; First in Javelin, First in Shot Put, Second in Discus
- Southern Counties Championships 1936; Record for Javelin (103 ft 5 3/4in)
- Member of the Empire Games Team, London 1934
