= Hilda Hatt =

British athlete

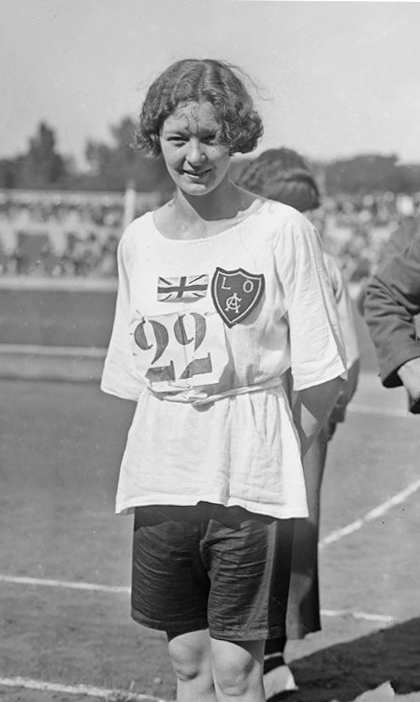
- Hatt at the 1922 Women's World Games

Personal information
- Born: 28 April 1903
- Died: 1975 (aged c. 72)
- Education: Woolwich Polytechnic

Sport
- Sport: Athletics
- Event(s): High jump, long jump, javelin throw, hurdles
- Club: London Olympiades; Polytechnic LAC

Achievements and titles
- Personal best(s): HJ – 1.524 m (1928); LJ – 5.16 m (1928); JT – 22.19 m (1924); 80 mH – 12.3 (1929 )
Medal record
Representing United Kingdom
Women's World Games
Gold medal – first place	1922 Paris	High jump
Silver medal – second place	1921 Monte Carlo	High jump
Silver medal – second place	1921 Monte Carlo	Long jump
Silver medal – second place	1922 Paris	100 yd hurdles
Silver medal – second place	1926 Gothenburg	High jump
Bronze medal – third place	1926 Gothenburg	100 yd hurdles

Hilda May Hatt (28 April 1903 – 1975) was a British athlete. She competed in the high jump, long jump and 100 yd hurdles and relay 4x175 metres. She participated in the 1921 Women's Olympiad, 1922 Women's Olympiad and the 1922 Women's World Games and won two gold, four silver and one bronze medals.

== Biography ==
In 1922, Hatt finished second behind Daisy Wright in the national 120 yards hurdle event and third behind Sylvia Stone in the national high jump event. The following year Hatt became the national high jump champion after winning the WAAA Championships title at the inaugural 1923 WAAA Championships. Hatt also finished second in the long jump and third in the 120 yards hurdles.

In 1924 she participated in the 1924 Women's Olympiad and won the silver medal in running 1000 m and hurdling 120 yards.

Hatt became the national 120 yards hurdles champion and national long jump champion after winning the WAAA Championships titles at the 1925 WAAA Championships and went on to win further titles over the sprint hurdles at the 1926 Championships, 1927 championships (75 m) and 1929 championships (80m).
