= Kenneth Pridie =

British shot putter, discus thrower and orthopaedic surgeon

Personal information
- Nationality: British (English)
- Born: 8 March 1906 Bristol, England
- Died: 4 May 1963 (aged 57) England

Sport
- Sport: Athletics
- Event: Shot put/ discus
- Club: Bristol University
Medal record
Men's Athletics
Representing England
British Empire Games
Bronze medal – third place	1934 London	Shot put

Kenneth Hampden Pridie (8 March 1906 – 4 May 1963) was an English track and field athlete who competed in the 1930 British Empire Games and in the 1934 British Empire Games.

== Biography ==
Pridie was born in Bristol. Shortly before the 1930 British Empire Games in Canada, Pridie finished third behind Jules Noël in the shot put event at the 1930 AAA Championships. Then at the 1930 British Empire Games he finished fourth in the discus throw event and sixth in the shot put competition.

He took two third-place finishes in the shot and discus events at both the 1931 AAA Championships and 1932 AAA Championships.

Two years later he won the bronze medal in the shot put contest and finished sixth in the discus throw event at the 1934 British Empire Games.

Pridie was an orthopaedic surgeon. He studied at the University of Bristol. With a Fellowship from the Royal College of Surgeons of England he visited Böhler in Vienna, Watson-Jones in Liverpool and Girdlestone in Oxford. Twenty-eight years old he became a fracture surgeon at Bristol Royal Infirmary. He developed several devices for fracture treatment and was an eminent surgeon. Pridie is known for a particular cartilage repair technique where repair by fibrocartilage formation is stimulated by drilling small holes into the subchondral bone plate after surgical debridement of cartilage defects, known as the Pridie drilling technique. He died of a heart attack in 1963.
