= 1923 WAAA Championships =

British athletics event

- Dates: 18 August
- Host city: London
- Venue: Oxo Sports Ground
- Level: Senior
- Type: Outdoor

The 1923 WAAA Championships were the first national track and field championships for women in the United Kingdom. The tournament was held on 18 August 1923, at the Oxo Sport Grounds in Downham, Lewisham in South London.

== Background ==
After the successful first 1922 Women's World Games in Paris and the three Women's Olympiads (1921 Women's Olympiad, 1922 Women's Olympiad and 1923 Women's World Games) in Monaco, the interest for women's sports also grew internationally. In 1922 the Women's Amateur Athletic Association (WAAA) was founded and that year several national women's track meets were held. (Note: The first women's university teams competed in track and field in 1921 and the Inter-Varsity Athletics Board (IVAB) in England held its first inter-varsity track and field competition for women in 1922. The Women's Inter-Varsity Athletics Board (WIVAB) was formed in 1923.)

=== 1922 national champions ===
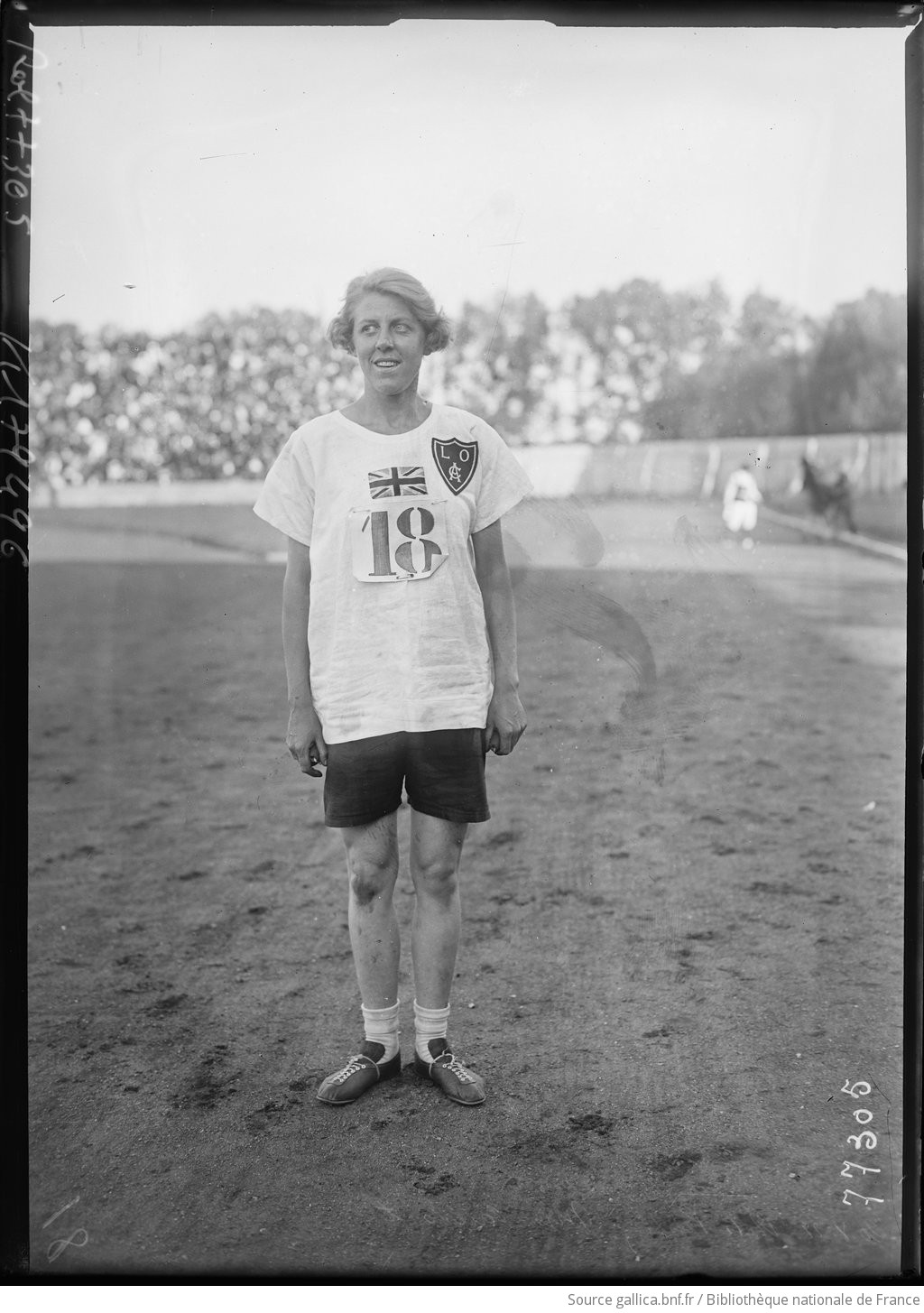
Nora Callebout

Event	Gold		Silver		Bronze		venue & notes
100 yards	Nora Callebout	12.2	Mary Lines	1 foot	Ivy J. Lowman	1 yard	Lyons Club, 3 June
220 yards	Mary Lines	26.8 WR	Nora Callebout	3 yards	Ivy J. Lowman	inches	
440 yards	Mary Lines	64.4 WR	Ivy J. Lowman	7 yards	Alice Cast		
880 yards	Mary Lines	2:26.6 WR	Jessie Brooks	5 yards	Phyllis Hall	20 yards	
120 yards hurdles	Daisy Wright	20.4	Hilda Hatt	inches	E. Johnson	5 yards	
high jump	Sylvia Stone	1.384	Sophie Eliott-Lynn		Hilda Hatt		

+ world record

== 1923 Inaugural Championship meeting ==
The athletes competed in 11 events: running 100 yards, 220 yards, 440 yards, 880 yards, relay race 660 yards, hurdling 120 yards, high jump, long jump, shot put, javelin and track walk 880 yards. 3 unofficial world records were set: Mary Lines in running 440 yards and hurdles 120 yards and Edith Trickey in track walk 880 yards. The tournament was a huge promotion for women's sports.

== Results ==
The results were:

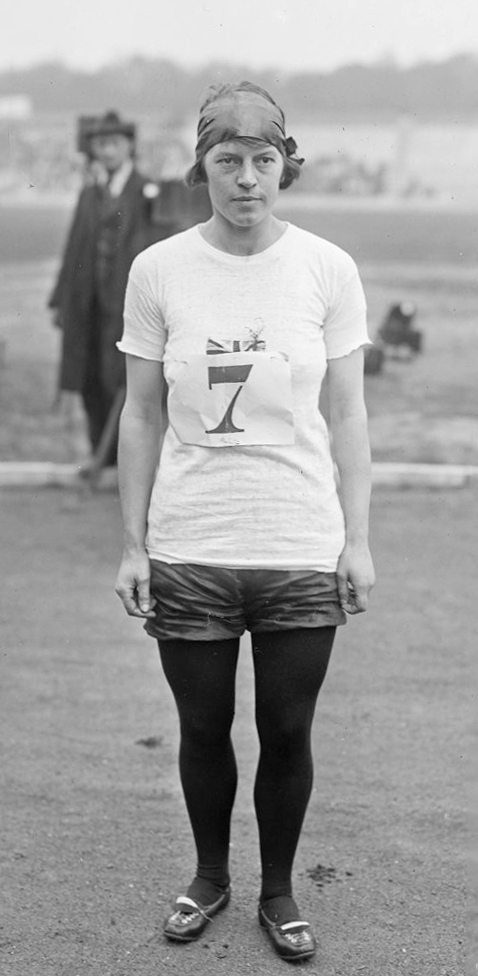
Mary Lines

Event	Gold		Silver		Bronze	
100 yards	Mary Lines (London Olympiades)	12.0 sec	Rose Thompson (Manor Park)		Evelyn Harris	
220 yards	Eileen Edwards (London Olympiades)	27.0 sec	Rose Thompson (Manor Park)		Vera Palmer	
440 yards	Mary Lines (London Olympiades)	62.4 sec WR	Louise Low (Manor Park)		P Batt (London Olympiades)	
880 yards	Edith Trickey (NB and MSC)	2:40.2 min	Gladys Lane		Phyllis Hall	
660-yard relay	London Olympiades "A"; Lines, A.M. Cust, Lowman, Edwards)	1:22.6 min	Manor Park Athletics Club		London Olympiades "B"	
120 yards hurdles	Mary Lines (London Olympiades)	18.8 sec WR	Sophie Eliott-Lynn (Kensington LAC)		Hilda Hatt (London Olympiades)	DQ
High jump	Hilda Hatt (London Olympiades)	1.45 m	Ivy J. Lowman (London Olympiades)	1.42 m	Sylvia Stone (Kensington LAC)	1.40 m
Long jump	Mary Lines (London Olympiades)	4.96 m	Hilda Hatt (London Olympiades)	4.86 m	Gladys Elliott	4.66 m
Shot put(8 lb)	Florence Birchenough (London Olympiades)	16.17 (yds?)	Beatrice Manton	16.00	Sophie Eliott-Lynn (Kensington LAC)	15.78
Two-handed javelin	Sophie Eliott-Lynn (Kensington LAC)	35.76 (yds?)	E Willis	31.08	Sylvia Stone (Kensington LAC)	30.53
880-yard walk	Edith Trickey (NB and MSC)	4:35.0 min WR	Betty Keeling		D Clark	

== See also ==
- 1923 AAA Championships
