= Janet Thompson (athlete) =

British discus thrower

Personal information
- Nationality: British (English)
- Born: 21 February 1954 (age 72) Bracknell, Great Britain

Sport
- Sport: Athletics
- Event: Discus throw / Shot put
- Club: Bracknell AC

Janet Frances Thompson, married name Janet Kane (born 21 February 1954) is a female former athlete who competed for England.

== Biography ==
Thompson finished second behind Meg Ritchie in the discus event at the 1975 WAAA Championships.

Thompson became the British discus throw champion after winning the British WAAA Championships title at the 1976 WAAA Championships and went on to win it again at both the 1978 WAAA Championships and 1979 WAAA Championships.

She represented England in the discus, at the 1978 Commonwealth Games in Edmonton, Alberta, Canada.
