= Lynda Whiteley =

British discus thrower

Personal information
- Nationality: British (English)
- Born: 7 April 1963 (age 63) Huddersfield, West Riding of Yorkshire, England

Sport
- Sport: Athletics
- Event: discus throw
- Club: Enfield & Haringey Athletic Club
Medal record
Athletics
Representing England
Commonwealth Games
Bronze medal – third place	1982 Brisbane	discus

Lynda Ruth Whiteley (married name Wright) (born 7 April 1963) is a female former athlete who competed for England.

== Biography r ==
Whiteley represented England and won a bronze medal in the discus, at the 1982 Commonwealth Games in Brisbane, Australia.

Whiteley became the British discus throw champion after winning the British WAAA Championships title at the 1983 WAAA Championships and then retained her title at the 1984 WAAA Championships.
