= 1926 Women's World Games =

- Host city: Gothenburg
- Country: Sweden
- Dates: 27–29 August 1926

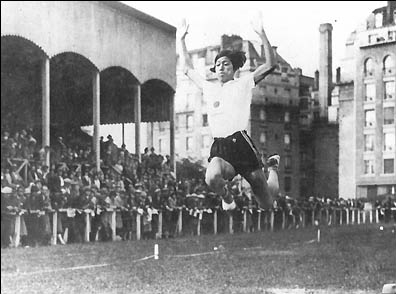
Kinue Hitomi, winner of the long jump event

The 1926 Women's World Games (Swedish II. Internationella kvinnliga idrottsspelen, French 2èmes jeux féminins mondiaux ) were the second regular international Women's World Games, the tournament was held between 27 – 29 August at the Slottsskogsvallen Stadium in Gothenburg.

== Events ==
The games were organized by the Fédération Sportive Féminine Internationale under Alice Milliat as a response to the IOC refusal to include women's events in the 1924 Olympic Games.

The games were attended by 100 participants from 9 nations: Belgium, Czechoslovakia, France, Great Britain, Japan, Latvia, Poland, Sweden and Switzerland. Kinue Hitomi was the sole participant from Japan, she won the long jump with a new world record, she also won the standing long jump, came second place in discus, third in 100 yards, fifth in 60 metres and sixth in 250 metres putting Japan in fifth place single-handedly.

The athletes competed in 12 events: running (60 metres, 100 yards, 250 metres, 1000 metres, 4 x 110 yards relay och hurdling 100 yards), high jump, long jump, standing long jump, discus throw, javelin and shot put.

The tournament was opened with an olympic style ceremony, the opening speech was held by Mary von Sydow (wife of Oscar von Sydow). The games attended an audience of 20,000 spectators and several world records were set.

== Results ==
| Event | Gold | | Silver | | Bronze | |
|---|---|---|---|---|---|---|
| 60 m | Marguerite Radideau; France | 7.8 | Florence Haynes; United Kingdom | 7.8 | Rose Thompson; United Kingdom | 7.8 |
| 100 yd | Marguerite Radideau; France | 11.8 | Rose Thompson; United Kingdom | 11.8 | Kinue Hitomi; Japan | 12.0 |
| 250 m | Eileen Edwards; United Kingdom | 33.4 | Vera Palmer; Great Britain | 34.6 | Marguerite Radideau; France | 35.4 |
| 1000 m | Edith Trickey; United Kingdom | 3:08.8 | Inga Gentzel; Sweden | 3:09.4 | Louise Bellon; France | 3:10.4 |
| 100 yds hurdles | Ludmila Sychrová; Poland | 14.4 | Edith White; United Kingdom | 14.8 | Hilda Hatt; United Kingdom | 15.0 |
| 4×110 yds relay | United Kingdom; Dorothy Scouler; Florence Haynes; Eileen Edwards; Rose Thompson | 49.8 | France; Louise Bellon; Geneviève Laloz; Yolande Plancke; Marguerite Radideau | 51.2 | Czechoslovakia | 52.8 |
| 1000 m track walk | Daisy Crossley; United Kingdom | 5:10.0 | Albertine Regel; France | 5:12.4 | Only two starters | |
| High jump | Hélène Bons; France | 1.50 m | Hilda Hatt; United Kingdom | 1.45 m | Inga Broman; Sweden | 1.45 m |
| Long jump | Kinue Hitomi; Japan | 5.50 m | Muriel Gunn; United Kingdom | 5.44 m | Zdena Smolová; Czechoslovakia | 5.28 m |
| Standing long jump | Kinue Hitomi; Japan | 2.49 m | Zdena Smolová; Czechoslovakia | 2.47 m | Barbara Holliday; United Kingdom | 2.37 m |
| Discus throw | Halina Konopacka; Poland | 37.71 m | Kinue Hitomi; Japan | 33.62 m | Elsa Svensson; Sweden | 31.78 m |
| Javelin throw Two handed | Anne-Lisa Adelsköld; Sweden | 49.15 m | Louise Fawcett; United Kingdom | 45.41 m | Märta Hallgren; Sweden | 45.06 m |
| Shot put Two handed ^{[nb]} | Maria Vidlaková; Czechoslovakia | 19.54 m | Elsa Svensson; Sweden | 19.42 m | Halina Konopacka; Poland | 19.25 m |

- ^{nb} Each athlete in the shot put and javelin throw events threw using their right hand, then their left. Their final mark was the total of the best mark with their right-handed throw and the best mark with their left-handed throw.

Also Sophie Mary Eliott-Lynn competed at javelin throw coming fourth with a throw of 44.63 metres and Mary Weston finished sixth in the shot put.

== Points table ==
| Place | Nation | Points |
|---|---|---|
| 1 | United Kingdom | 50 |
| 2 | France | 27 |
| 3 | Sweden | 20 |
| 4 | Czechoslovakia | 19 |
| 5 | Japan | 15 |
| 6 | Poland | 7 |
| 7 | Latvia | 1 |
