= International Women's Sports Federation =

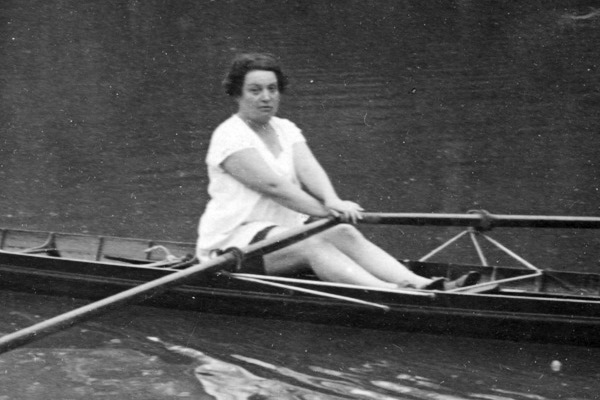
Alice Milliat, French sportswoman.

The Fédération Sportive Féminine Internationale (FSFI) – or, in English, the International Women's Sports Federation – was founded in October 1921 by Alice Milliat because of the unwillingness of existing sports organisations, such as the International Olympic Committee and the International Amateur Athletics Federation, to let women compete in sports, particularly at an international level.

== History ==
Between 1922 and 1934, it organised the Women's World Games on four occasions: I. 1922, II. 1926, III. 1930 and IV. 1934. (Note: Women's teams from universities in the United Kingdom initiated women's inter-varsity competition in 1921 and the Inter-Varsity Athletics Board (IVAB) in England also held its first inter-varsity track and field competition for women in 1922. The Women's Inter-Varsity Athletics Board (WIVAB) was formed in 1923.) Although the FSFI collapsed in about 1936 without having achieved most of its goals, its activities, and the potential threat it posed to the International Olympic Committee (IOC) and International Amateur Athletics Federation (IAAF), led to the inclusion of women's athletics events in the Olympic Games from 1928 onwards and the organisation of women's athletics championships at international level by the IAAF.

Alice Milliat founded the International Women's Sports Federation. She was first a part of the Femina-Sport and an important figure in women's sports. After much hard work in Paris, France, on October 31, 1921, the Fédération Sportive Fèminine Internationale, or the International Women's Sports Federation was created.

The FSFI was ready to join the Olympic games, however; the International Olympic Committee and the International Amateur Athletic Federation declined their request. The organization was faced with an obstacle, but Milliat had a plan. "At its first meeting, it began making rules and regulations for the international competition, drew up a constitution, and set about making plans for a Women’s Olympic Games." The Games were held every four years, and during their 15th Anniversary more the 20,000 people came and supported the organization and the women participating in the Games.

The popularity of women's sports increased and the International Olympic Committee became interested. (Note: The first women's national championships in track and field were held after the inaugural 1922 Women's World Games and the 1921, 1922 and 1923 Women's Olympiads. In the United Kingdom, the Women's Amateur Athletic Association was founded in 1922 and held the first WAAA Championships the following year. In the United States, the 1923 USA Outdoor Track and Field Championships included a women's competition for the first time.) In 1923, The International Olympic Committee wanted to have the international federations take over and control the women's activities. The International Amateur Athletic Federation took control of the Women's Games. In 1928 they decided to have only five events for women to compete in. The FSFI was furious and so were the women. The British women were so against the IAAF decision that they decided to boycott the 1928 Games. However, Alice Milliat fought for her organization and the women playing in it. The Third Women's World Games were held in Prague, Czechoslovakia. The FSFI, however, began to have fewer and fewer events in the Olympic Games. The federation got angry and began to fight, however; the FSFI would rather not have no women's events. The FSFI would later realize that their demands would lead to the end of their organization.

In Los Angeles in 1932, the German Amateur Athletic Federation recommended that the IAAF take over the organization. Milliat, furious at this suggestion, fought back explained that the International Amateur Athletic Federation wanted nothing to do with a women's sports federation before. However, the International Olympic Committee was becoming reluctant of allowing women to participate in sports. In result of this, the FSFI decided to promote a Women's Olympic Games. The next year, Alice Milliat decided to ask the International Olympic Committee to discontinue women from playing in their Olympic Games. The two organizations came to an agreement, first of all, the IAAF would admit to the times and records the FSFI would record. Second, a program for women and sports would be established, and third, the Fifth Women's World Game would be expected to take place in Vienna.

By the 1930s The International Women's Sports Federation was finally recognized as a strong, thriving company by the IAAF and the IOC, but in 1934 the organization disintegrated. Its work has helped organizations such as the IAAF and the IOC recognize the importance of women's rights.
