= Mark Weston (athlete) =

British track and field athlete

Medal record

Women's Athletics

Representing England

Women's World Games

Mark Edward Louis Weston (born Mary Edith Louise Weston, 30 March 1905 – 29 January 1978), nicknamed "the Devonshire Wonder", was a British field athlete in women's competitions who participated during the 1920s. Weston was a national champion in the women's javelin throw and discus throw in 1929 and won the women's shot put title in 1925, 1928 and 1929. Weston also finished sixth, at the 1926 Women's World Games, in the two-handed shot put, where the final result was a sum of two best throws with the right hand and with the left hand. Weston was born with atypical genitals due to being intersex and was assigned female at birth. Weston was raised as a girl. In April and May 1936, Weston underwent a series of corrective surgeries at the Charing Cross Hospital.

Born in Oreston, Weston worked in a clothing factory after leaving school and then as a nurse, which lead to him pursuing a career in massage and earning a diploma. He became interested in amateur athletics in 1924, taking part until 1930. Weston explained in an interview that his studies into anatomy led to him questioning his gender in 1930.

After surgery, Weston changed his first name to Mark, retired from competitions, and returned to work as a masseur. In July 1936, Weston married Alberta Matilda Bray, and they had three children.

His elder sibling Harry (previously known as Hilda) also changed his gender presentation and name in the 1930s. Harry died by suicide by hanging while suffering from depression in 1942.

Weston died in the Freedom Fields Hospital in Plymouth in 1978.

== Gallery ==
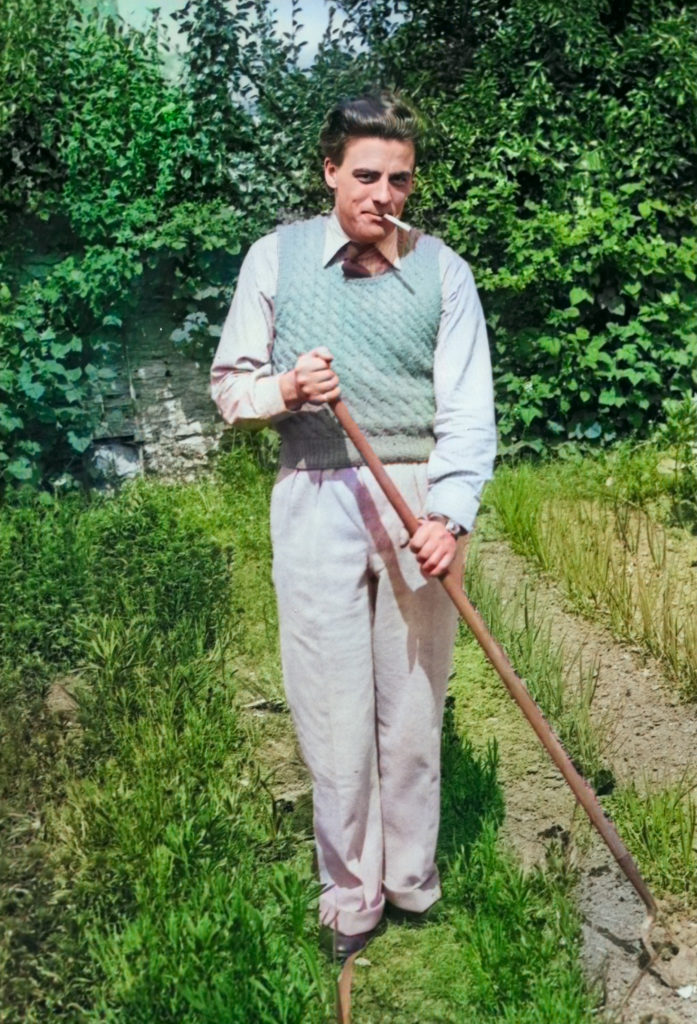
Weston in 1936 (colorized)

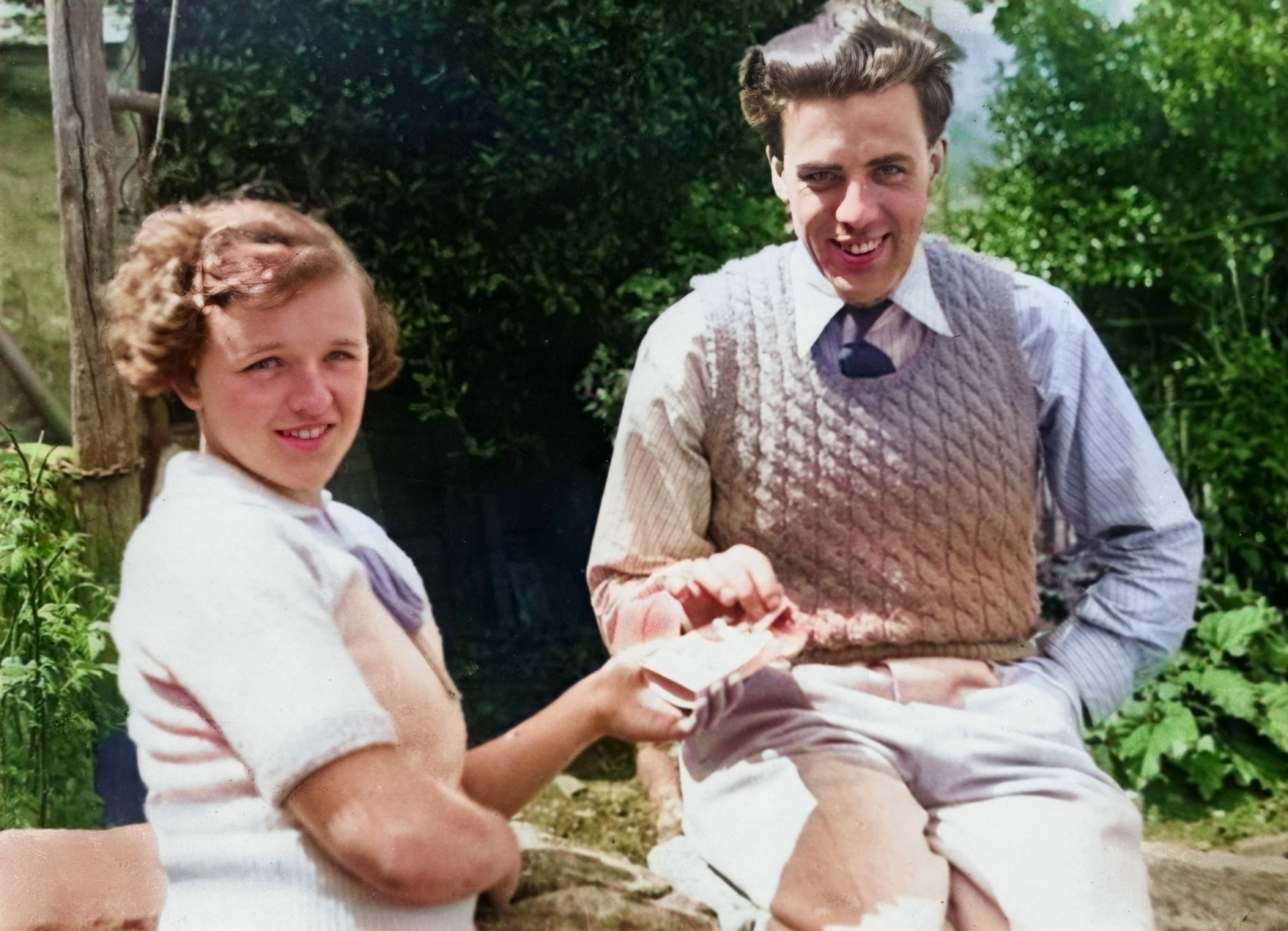
Weston with his wife Alberta Matilda Bray in 1936 (colorized)

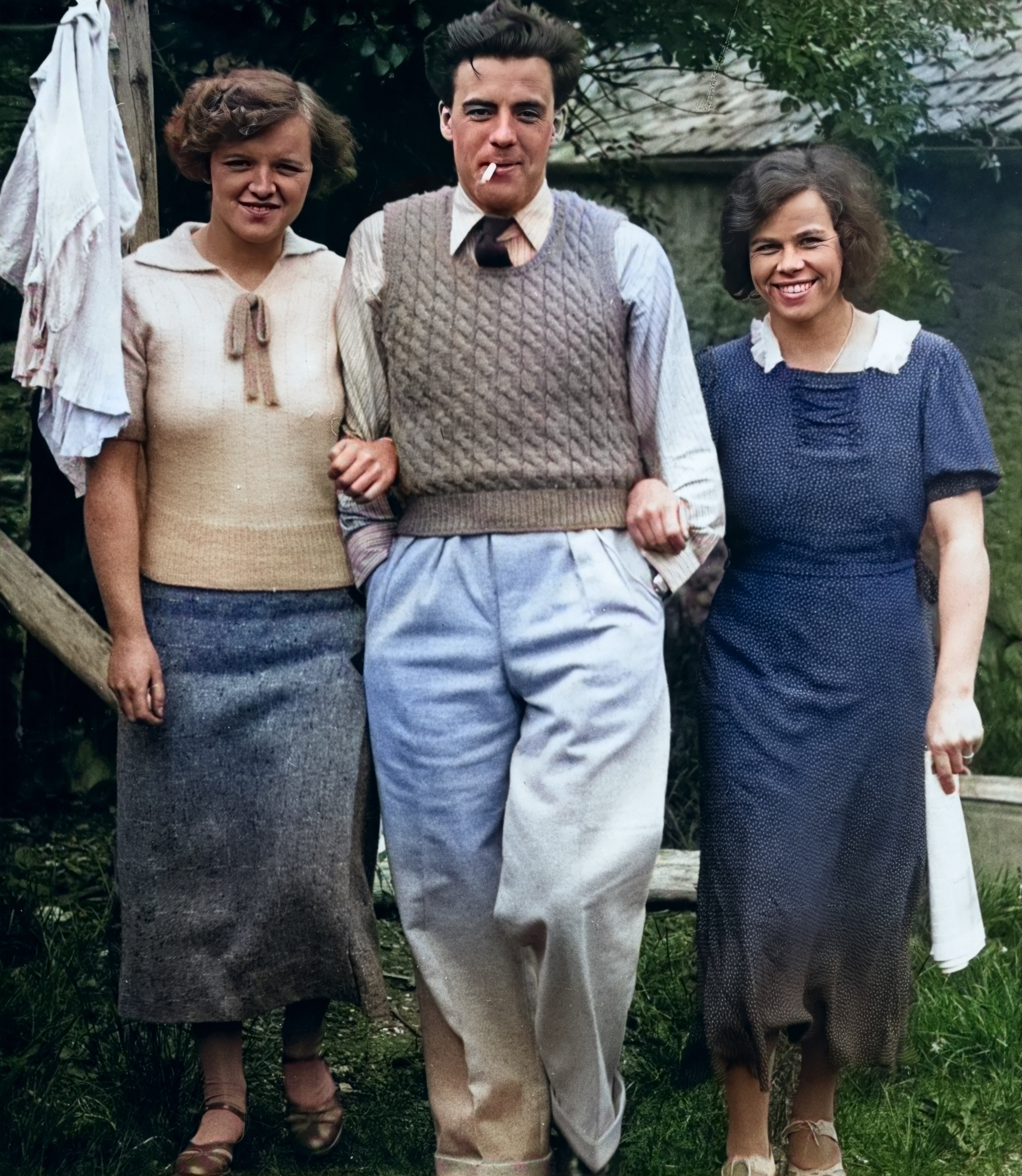
Weston with his wife and a friend in 1936 (colorized)

== See also ==
- Witold Smętek
