= London Olympiades Athletic Club =

British athletics club

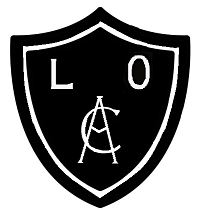
- Founded: 1921
- Location: London, England

London Olympiades Athletic Club is a British athletics club based in London. It was the first women's athletics club formed in he United Kingdom. The club held championship meetings at Battersea Park.

== History ==
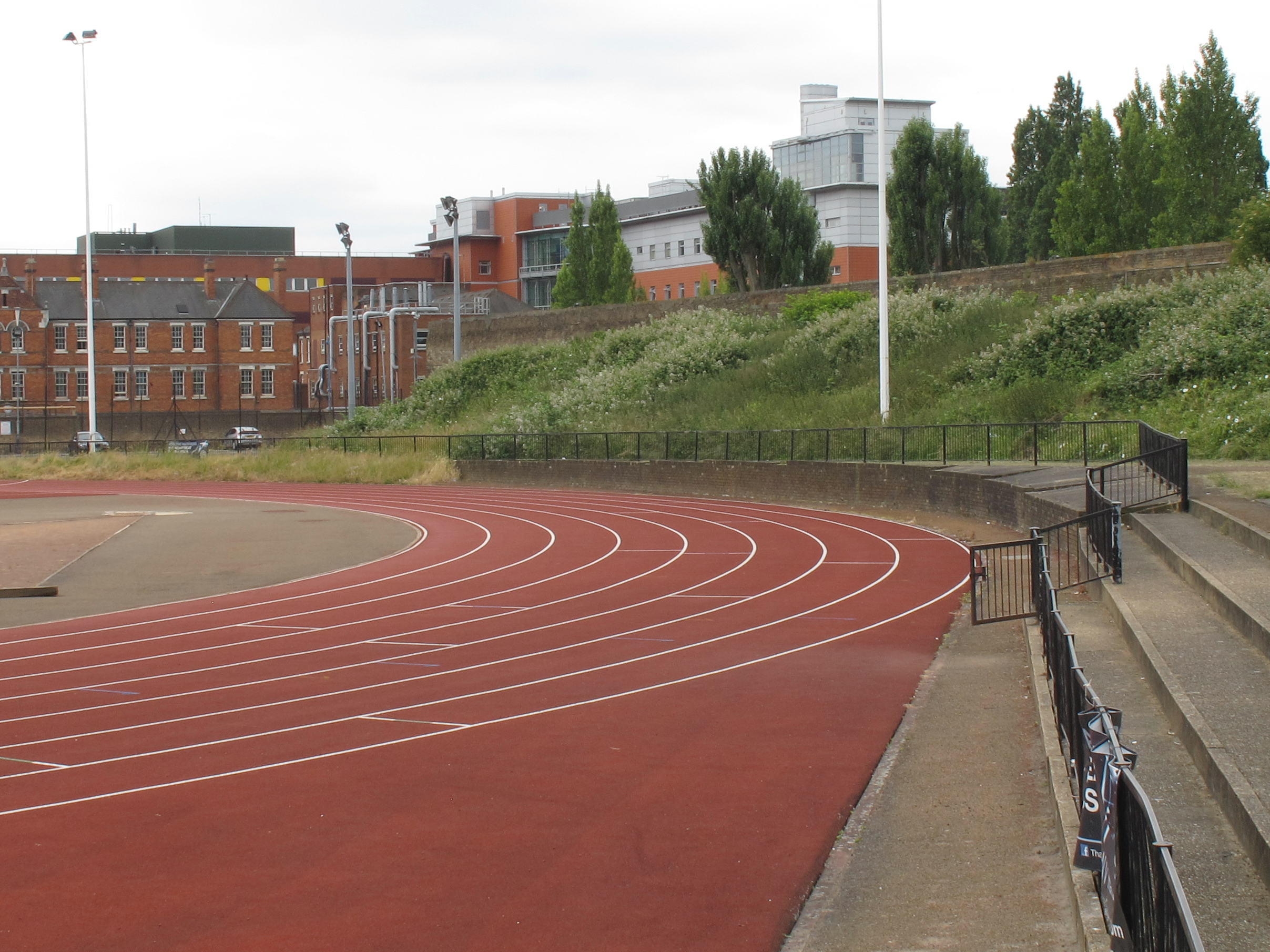
West London Stadium running track

In 1921, Alice Milliat of France organised the 1921 Women's Olympiad, which was the first international women's sports event, a 5-day multi-sport event held on 24–31 March at Monte Carlo. Consequently, on their return journey some of the English athletes decided to form an athletics club.

The pioneering action resulted in the formation of London Olympiades Athletic Club, the first women only club in the United Kingdom. The club practiced on Tuesday and Friday evenings at the Paddington Recreation Ground in the summer months and raced cross country in the winter months.

Rival clubs such as Polytechnic Ladies' Athletic Club, Middlesex Ladies' Athletic Club and Kensington Ladies' Athletic Clubs soon followed. They all became members of the newly formed Women's Amateur Athletic Association and at the inaugural 1923 WAAA Championships, London Olympiades dominated the Championships and were a major force in women's athletics for many years.

During the 1920s and 1930s, the club provided several athletes for the Women's Olympiad and Women's World Games (the equivalent (although much smaller) to the men's Olympic Games) at the time.

After World War II many women joined clubs that were open to both men and women or in some cases clubs merged but London Olympiades remained a women's only club. During the 1960s, the club continued to produce champions such as Mary Bignal.

The club moved from Alperton Stadium to West London Stadium in 1968 and in 1970 was still ranked the number one women's club in the United Kingdom.

By 1980 the club was struggling with membership and from the mid-1980s was only producing long-distance runners such as Leslie Watson.

== Olympic (or Olympiad) athletes ==
- Doris Batter
- Mary Bignal-Rand
- Lillian Board
- Nora Callebout
- Diane Charles
- Hilda Hatt
- Eileen Hiscock
- Della James-Pascoe
- Mary Lines
- Ivy Lowman
- Anita Neil
- Sue Platt
- Gwen Porter
- Janet Simpson
