= Women's World Games =

Interwar Era women's sports festival

- Purpose: inclusion of women's sports at the Olympic Games
- Frequency: Every 4 years
- Inaugurated: 1922
- Most recent: 1934
- Headquarters: Fédération Sportive Féminine Internationale (FSFI), Paris, France

The Women's World Games were the first international women's sports events in track and field. The games were held four times between 1922 and 1934. They were established by Alice Milliat and the Fédération Sportive Féminine Internationale (FSFI) to compensate for the lack of women's sports at the Olympic Games. The games were an important step towards women's equality in sports. A forerunner tournament was held in Monte Carlo in March 1921.

== Background ==
Women were allowed to take part in the Olympic games since 1900 (II Olympiad in golf and tennis, III Olympiad in archery, IV Olympiad in archery, figure skating and tennis, at the V Olympiad swimming was added as well).

In 1919 Alice Milliat started discussions with the International Olympic Committee (IOC) and the IAAF to also include women's track and field athletics events in the 1924 Olympic Games. On refusal Milliat organised a first competition in 1921 called the Women's Olympiad in Monte Carlo; further editions were held in 1922 and in 1923. (Note: Women's teams from universities in the United Kingdom initiated women's inter-varsity competition in 1921 and the Inter-Varsity Athletics Board (IVAB) in England held its first inter-varsity track and field competition for women in 1922. The Women's Inter-Varsity Athletics Board (WIVAB) was formed in 1923.) In 1924 the 1924 Women's Olympiad was held at Stamford Bridge in London.

On 31 October 1921, Milliat then formed La Fédération Sportive Féminine Internationale (FSFI) with the purpose to oversight international women's sporting events and the inclusion of women's events in the Olympics.

A European version of the women's games was hosted in 1931 in Florence and was known as the Olimpiadi della Grazia (Olympics of Grace).

== Events ==
In response to the refusal of the IAAF to include women's events in the 1924 Olympic Games the FSFI also organized the first Women's Olympic Games in Paris in 1922.

The IOC objected to the FSFI using the word "Olympic" in the title of its events. After negotiations the IOC and the IAAF therefore agreed to include 10 athletic events in the 1928 Olympic Games and in exchange Milliat altered the title to "Women's World Games". They finally included only 5 events (100 meters, 800 meters, 4 x 100 meters, high jump and discus) and only as an experiment.

The FSFI did not find this satisfactory and organised the third Women's World Games in Prague in 1930 and the fourth games in London in 1934.

Following some protracted arguments between the FSFI on the one hand and the IOC and IAAF on the other, the FSFI and an IAAF commission agreed that the IAAF should take control of all international women's athletic events in return for the IAAF recognising all FSFI records, a complete programme of women's Olympic events, and the IAAF holding the fifth Women's World Games in Vienna in 1938. In the event, while the 1936 IAAF Congress agreed to recognise FSFI records, it otherwise only agreed to proposing a somewhat expanded programme of Olympic events to the IOC (the IOC refused) and holding a programme of women's events in the 1938 European Athletics Championships in place of the Women's World Games. The FSFI ceased operations in 1938 without ever accepting or rejecting the IAAF's decisions.

== Sites ==
Four regular events were held, a planned 5th was cancelled as women participated in the 1938 European Athletics Championships.

| Edition | Year | Host city | Country | Stadium | Date | Participation |
|---|---|---|---|---|---|---|
| I | 1922 | Paris | France | Stade Pershing | 20 August | 77 athletes and 5 countries |
| II | 1926 | Gothenburg | Sweden | Slottsskogsvallen Stadium | 27–29 August | 100 athletes and 9 countries |
| III | 1930 | Prague | Czechoslovakia | Stadion Letná | 6–8 September | 200 athletes and 17 countries |
| IV | 1934 | London | United Kingdom | White City Stadium | 9–11 August | 200 athletes and 19 countries |

== Legacy ==
After the initial Women's World Games in 1922 in Paris and the three Women's Olympiads in Monaco in 1921 , 1922 and 1923, interest in women's sports grew internationally. In 1922, the Women's Amateur Athletic Association (WAAA) was founded in the United Kingdom. The WAAA organized the first official British women's championships in track and field (WAAA Championships) on 18 August 1923 at the Oxo Sports Ground in Downham outside London. (Note: In the United Kingdom, the first women's university teams competed in track and field in 1921 and the Inter-Varsity Athletics Board (IVAB) in England held its first inter-varsity track and field competition for women in 1922. The Women's Inter-Varsity Athletics Board (WIVAB) was formed in 1923.)

In the United States, the Amateur Athletic Union (AAU) was founded in 1888, and held its first national championship for women in the sport of swimming in 1916. In 1922, try-outs for the 1922 Women's World Games were held on 13 May at Oaksmere School in Mamaroneck, New York. Some historians consider this event to be the first "national" women's track meet.

In 1923, the AAU sponsored the first official American women's championships in track and field.
