= Athletics at the 1934 British Empire Games – Women's 220 yards =

Women's 220 yards at the Commonwealth Games

The women's 220 yards event at the 1934 British Empire Games was held on 6 and 7 August at the White City Stadium in London, England.

== Medalists ==
Gold	Silver	Bronze
Eileen Hiscock; England	Aileen Meagher; Canada	Nellie Halstead; England

== Results ==
=== Heats ===
Qualification: First 2 in each heat (Q) qualify directly for the final.

Rank	Heat	Name	Nationality	Time	Notes
1	1	Nellie Halstead	England	25.8	Q
2	1	Aileen Meagher	Canada	??.?	Q
3	1	Dorothy Ballantyne	Southern Rhodesia	??.?	
4	1	Irene Storey	Canada	??.?	
5	1	Cathie Jackson	Scotland	??.?	
	1	Doris Morgan	South Africa	DNS	
1	2	Eileen Hiscock	England	25.2	Q
2	2	Lillian Palmer	Canada	25.9e	Q, +3 yd
3	2	Ivy Walker	England	??.?	
4	2	Barbara Burke	South Africa	??.?	
5	2	Margaret Mackenzie	Scotland	??.?	
	2	Cynthia Keay	Southern Rhodesia	DNS	
1	3	Ethel Johnson	England	26.2	Q
2	3	Hilda Cameron	Canada	26.5e	Q, +2 yd
3	3	Marjorie Clark	South Africa	??.?	
4	3	Sheena Dobbie	Scotland	??.?	
5	3	Barbara Barnetson	Scotland	??.?	
	3	Mollie Bragg	Southern Rhodesia	DNS	

=== Final ===
Rank	Name	Nationality	Time	Notes
1st place, gold medalist(s)	Eileen Hiscock	England	25.0	
2nd place, silver medalist(s)	Aileen Meagher	Canada	25.4	+3 yd
3rd place, bronze medalist(s)	Nellie Halstead	England	25.6	+1.5 yd
4	Lillian Palmer	Canada	??.?	
5	Hilda Cameron	Canada	??.?	
6	Ethel Johnson	England	??.?	
