= Athletics at the 1934 British Empire Games – Women's 100 yards =

Women's 100 yards at the Commonwealth Games

The women's 100 yards event at the 1934 British Empire Games was held on 5 and 6 August at the White City Stadium in London, England.

== Medalists ==
Gold	Silver	Bronze
Eileen Hiscock; England	Hilda Strike; Canada	Leonard Chalmers; England

== Results ==
=== Heats ===
Qualification: First 2 in each heat (Q) qualify directly for the final.

Rank	Heat	Name	Nationality	Time	Notes
1	1	Eileen Hiscock	England	11.1	Q
2	1	Hilda Strike	Canada	??.?	Q, +2 yd
3	1	Peggy Matheson	Canada	??.?	
4	1	Doris Morgan	South Africa	??.?	
5	1	Cathie Jackson	Scotland	??.?	
6	1	Mollie Bragg	Southern Rhodesia	??.?	
1	2	Elsie Maguire	England	11.5	Q
2	2	Audrey Dearnley	Canada	11.8e	Q, +2 yd
3	2	Marjorie Clark	South Africa	??.?	
4	2	Joan Cunningham	Scotland	??.?	
5	2	Margaret Mackenzie	Scotland	??.?	
6	2	Dorothy Ballantyne	Southern Rhodesia	??.?	
1	3	Ethel Johnson	England	11.4	Q
2	3	Leonard Chalmers	England	??.?	Q, +0.5 yd
3	3	Betty White	Canada	??.?	
4	3	Barbara Burke	South Africa	??.?	
5	3	Barbara Barnetson	Scotland	??.?	
6	3	Cynthia Keay	Southern Rhodesia	??.?	

=== Final ===
Rank	Name	Nationality	Time	Notes
1st place, gold medalist(s)	Eileen Hiscock	England	11.3	
2nd place, silver medalist(s)	Hilda Strike	Canada	11.5e	+3 yd
3rd place, bronze medalist(s)	Leonard Chalmers	England	11.6e	+1 yd
4	Elsie Maguire	England	11.6e	
5	Ethel Johnson	England	11.7e	
6	Audrey Dearnley	Canada	??.?	
