= Athletics at the 1934 British Empire Games – Women's 110–220–110 yards relay =

Athletic Relay Event

The women's 110–220–110 yards relay event at the 1934 British Empire Games was held on 6 August at the White City Stadium in London, England.

== Results ==
Rank	Nation	Athletes	Time	Notes
1st place, gold medalist(s)	England	Nellie Halstead, Eileen Hiscock, Elsie Maguire	49.4	
2nd place, silver medalist(s)	Canada	Aileen Meagher, Audrey Dearnley, Hilda Strike	50.2e	+7 yd
3rd place, bronze medalist(s)	Southern Rhodesia	Dorothy Ballantyne, Mollie Bragg, Cynthia Keay	52.0e	+15 yd
4	South Africa	Doris Morgan, Marjorie Clark, Barbara Burke	??.?	
	Scotland	Sheena Dobbie, Cathie Jackson, Barbara Barnetson	DNF	
