= 1934 WAAA Championships =

British athletics event

- Dates: 30 June
- Host city: London
- Venue: Herne Hill Athletics Ground
- Level: Senior
- Type: Outdoor

The 1934 WAAA Championships were the national track and field championships for women in the United Kingdom.

The event was held at Herne Hill Athletics Ground, London, on 30 June 1934. The athletics track and field area was situated inside the cycling track.

== Results ==
Event	Gold		Silver		Bronze	
100 metres	Eileen Hiscock	12.2 =NR	Elsie Maguire	12.3	Ethel Johnson	12.4
200 metres	Nellie Halstead	25.6	Eileen Hiscock	25.9e	Ethel Johnson	26.2e
400 metres	Violet Branch	60.0	Edith Street	61.7e	Nellie Bishop	
800 metres	Gladys Lunn	2:18.3	Ida Jones	2:21.0e	Dorothy Butterfield	2:22.9e
80 metres hurdles	Elsie Green	12.0	Violet Webb	12.0	Kathleen Tiffen	
High jump	(Germany) Gretel Bergmann	1.549	Mary Milne	1.524	Hilda Thorogood	1.473
Long jump	Phyllis Bartholomew	5.55	Muriel Cornell	5.27	Doris Razzell	5.16
Shot put	Kathleen Tilley	10.04	Irene Phillips	9.62	Ruby Davis	9.15
Discus throw	Irene Phillips	31.00	Ada Holland	30.74	Ruby Davis	28.29
Javelin	Edith Halstead	34.28	Gladys Lunn	31.53	Louise Fawcett	31.05
1600 metres walk	Jeanne Probekk	7:38.2	Jessie Howes	7:40.0	Virna Tosh (Horwood)	

== See also ==
- 1934 AAA Championships
