= Athletics at the 1934 British Empire Games – Women's 220–110–220–110 yards relay =

The women's 220–110–220–110 yards relay event (also advertised as 660 yards) at the 1934 British Empire Games was held on 5 August at the White City Stadium in London, England.

== Results ==
Rank	Nation	Athletes	Time	Notes
1st place, gold medalist(s)	Canada	Lillian Palmer, Betty White, Aileen Meagher, Audrey Dearnley	1:14.4	
2nd place, silver medalist(s)	England	Eileen Hiscock, Ivy Walker, Nellie Halstead, Ethel Johnson	?:??.?	+1.5 yd
3rd place, bronze medalist(s)	Scotland	Margaret Mackenzie, Cathie Jackson, Sheena Dobbie, Joan Cunningham	?:??.?	+40 yd
