= Athletics at the 1934 British Empire Games – Women's high jump =

Women's high jump at the Commonwealth Games

The women's high jump event at the 1934 British Empire Games was held on 5 August at the White City Stadium in London, England.

== Results ==
Rank	Name	Nationality	Result	Notes
1st place, gold medalist(s)	Marjorie Clark	South Africa	5 ft 3 in (1.60 m)	
2nd place, silver medalist(s)	Eva Dawes	Canada	5 ft 2 in (1.57 m)	
3rd place, bronze medalist(s)	Margaret Bell	Canada	5 ft 0 in (1.52 m)	
4	Mary Milne	England	5 ft 0 in (1.52 m)	
5	Isabel Miller	Canada	4 ft 10 in (1.47 m)	
6	Marjorie O'Kell	England	4 ft 9 in (1.45 m)	
7	Hilda Thorogood	England	?.??	
8	Elsie Harris	England	?.??	
9	Mollie Bragg	Southern Rhodesia	?.??	
