= Athletics at the 1934 British Empire Games – Women's 80 metres hurdles =

Women's 80 metres hurdles at the Commonwealth Games

The women's 80 metres hurdles event at the 1934 British Empire Games was held on 5 and 7 August at the White City Stadium in London, England.

== Medalists ==
Gold	Silver	Bronze
Marjorie Clark; South Africa	Betty Taylor; Canada	Elsie Green; England

== Results ==
=== Heats ===
Qualification: First 3 in each heat (Q) qualify directly for the semifinals.

Rank	Heat	Name	Nationality	Time	Notes
1	1	Betty Taylor	Canada	12.1	Q
2	1	Alda Wilson	Canada	12.2e	Q, +2 ft
3	1	Phyllis Goad	England	??.?	Q, +1 yd
	1	Violet Webb	England	DNF	
1	2	Elsie Green	England	11.9	Q
2	2	Marjorie Clark	South Africa	??.?	Q, +1 ft
3	2	Roxy Atkins	Canada	??.?	Q, +1 yd
4	2	Kathleen Tiffen	England	??.?	

=== Final ===
Held on 7 August

Rank	Name	Nationality	Time	Notes
1st place, gold medalist(s)	Marjorie Clark	South Africa	11.8	
2nd place, silver medalist(s)	Betty Taylor	Canada	11.9e	+1 yd
3rd place, bronze medalist(s)	Elsie Green	England	12.2e	+2 yd
4	Roxy Atkins	Canada	??.?	
5	Alda Wilson	Canada	??.?	
6	Phyllis Goad	England	??.?	
