= Florieda Batson =

American hurdler (1900–1996)

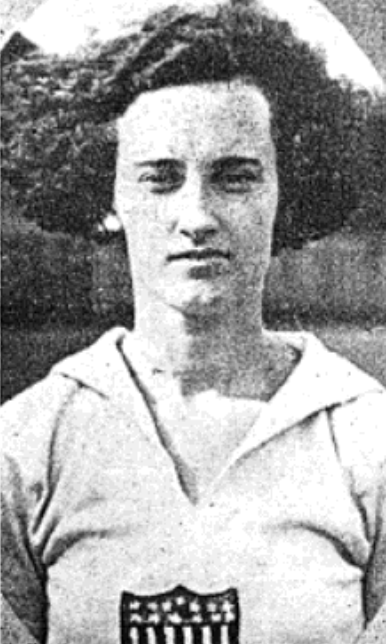
- Batson in 1922
- Born: Florieda Burton Batson; November 20, 1900; New Orleans, Louisiana
- Died: January 31, 1996 (aged 95); New Orleans, Louisiana
- Other names: Florieda Gibbens
- Occupation(s): Olympic athlete, sports journalist

Florieda Burton Batson Gibbens (November 20, 1900 – January 31, 1996) was an American hurdler and captain of the United States team at the Women's Olympics in Paris in 1922.

== Early life and education ==
Batson was born in New Orleans, the youngest of three children born to Robert Percy Batson, a successful businessman born in Barbados, and his wife Florieda Burton Batson. Mrs. Batson died when Florieda was 3, and Florieda's two older brothers died in accidents. Mr. Batson sent Florieda to live with relatives in Alabama and New York, and she attended Rosemary Hall Academy (later Choate Rosemary Hall) in Connecticut. After graduating from Rosemary Hall, Batson enrolled at Smith College.

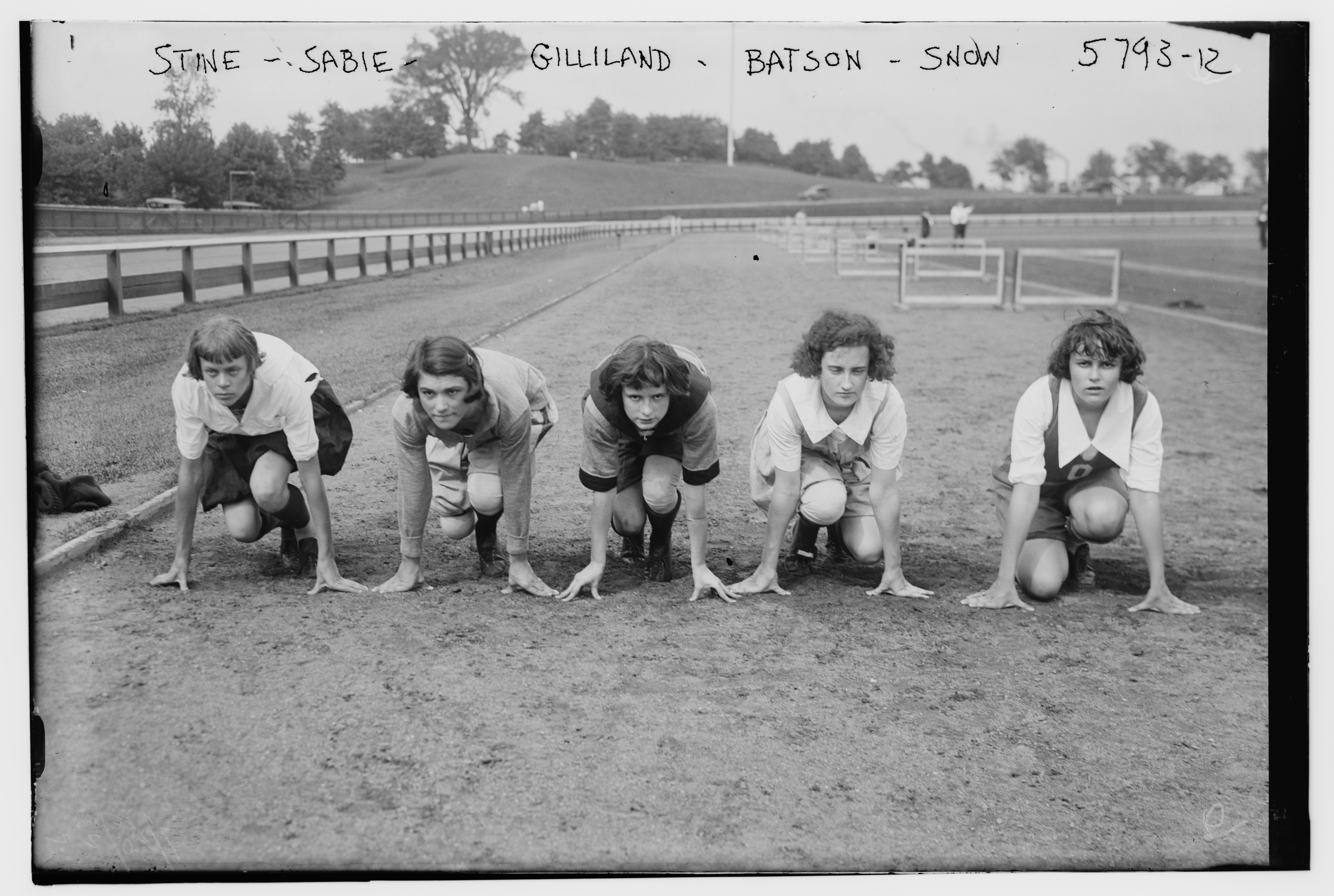
Left to right: Elizabeth Stine, Camille Sabie, Maybelle Gilliland Florieda Batson, Janet Snow

== Career ==
At Rosemary Hall, Batson learned hurdling as well as playing field hockey and basketball. She quickly became the leading American short-distance female hurdler; Batson was undefeated between 1919 and 1921 and set U.S. records in the 60-yard high hurdles (9.0 seconds) and the 100-yard low hurdles (14.4 seconds).

In 1922, Batson was invited to join the team of 13 American women attending the 1922 Women's Olympics, an event organized by French women's athletics pioneer Alice Milliat. The team, mostly consisting of East Coast prep school and college students like Batson, chose her as captain. A diagram of all her physical measurements was published in the Daily News, describing her as having "proportions closely approaching perfection."

At the Paris games, Batson sprained her left ankle when she hit a hurdle during the team's first practice. She won her qualifying heat, but failed to finish the final when her injured ankle caused her to fall.

After the Women's Olympics, Batson returned to New Orleans, where she was hired to edit the sports page of the New Orleans Item.

== Personal life ==
Batson married local businessman William Joseph Gibbens, Jr. in 1924. The couple had two daughters, Patricia and Jean. Her husband died in 1976. When Florieda Batson Gibbens died in 1996, she was survived by 11 grandchildren and 24 great-grandchildren.
