= Barbara Barnetson =

Scottish athlete

Personal information
- Nationality: British (Scottish)
- Born: 1912 Portobello, Scotland
- Died: 3 January 1987 (aged 74–75) Edinburgh, Scotland

Sport
- Sport: Athletics
- Event: Sprints
- Club: Edinburgh University Athletics Club

Barbara Urquhart Barnetson married name Routley (1912 – 3 January 1987) was a track and field athlete from Scotland who competed at the 1934 British Empire Games (now Commonwealth Games).

== Biography ==
Barnetson studied at the University of Edinburgh and was a member of their athletics club.

She represented the Scottish Empire Games team at the 1934 British Empire Games in London, England, participating in three events, the 100 yards, the 220 yards and the relay, with Cathie Jackson and Sheena Dobbie.

In 1938, she was appointed senior lady resident at the Edinburgh Royal Maternity and Simpson Memorial Hospital. She married Paul Routley in 1940.
