= 1932 WAAA Championships =

British athletics event

- Dates: 9 July
- Host city: London
- Venue: Stamford Bridge
- Level: Senior
- Type: Outdoor

The 1932 WAAA Championships were the national track and field championships for women in the United Kingdom.

The event was held at Stamford Bridge, London, on 9 July 1932. Ethel Johnson broke the 100 yards world record in the heats, setting a time of 11.0 sec.

== Results ==
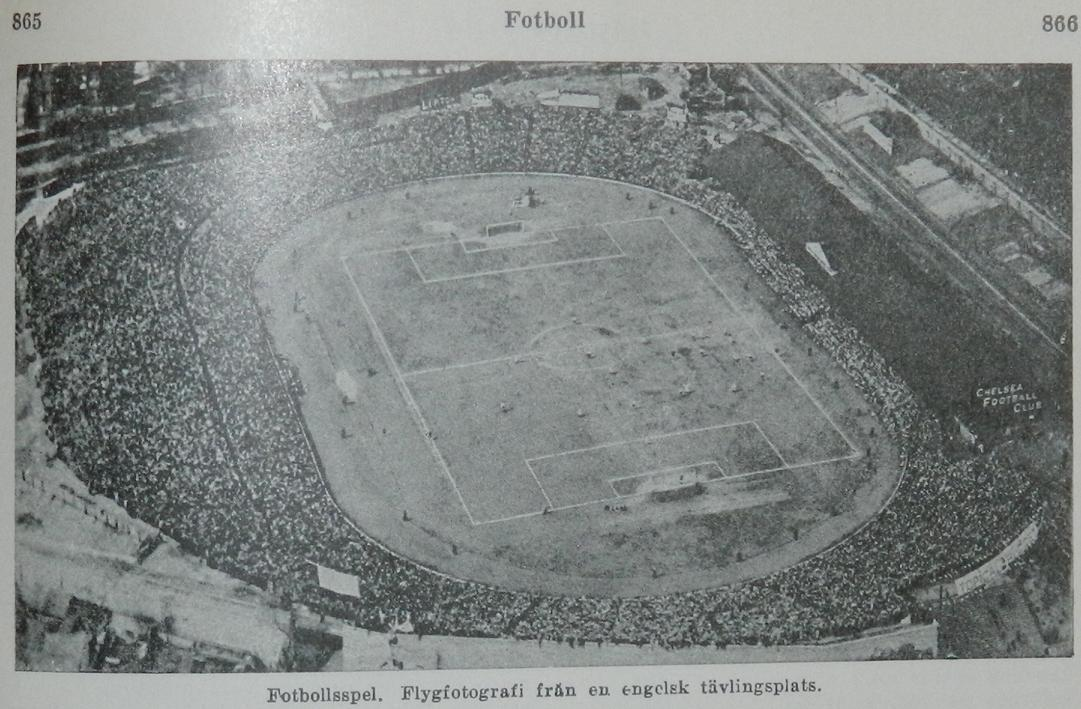
Stamford Bridge hosted the WAAA's for the last time

Event	Gold		Silver		Bronze	
100 yards	Ethel Johnson	11.1	Eileen Hiscock	inches	Gwendoline Porter	
220 yards	Nellie Halstead	25.6	Eileen Hiscock	26.0e	Daisy Ridgley	26.2e
440 yards	Nellie Halstead	56.8 WR	Violet Branch	18 yards	Violet Humphries	21 yards
880 yards	Gladys Lunn	2:20.4	(Scotland) Constance Johnson	2:21.8	Dorothy Butterfield	2:28.5e
80 metres hurdles	Elsie Green	12.2	Marjorie O'Kell	5 yards	Phyllis Goad	
High jump	Mary Milne	1.549	Marjorie O'Kell	1.524	Florence Wall	1.524
Long jump	Phyllis Bartholomew	5.69	Mary Seary	5.33	Doris Razzell	5.25
Shot put	Irene Phillips	9.00	Florence Birchenough	8.79	Nellie Purvey	8.76
Discus throw	Ada Holland	30.86	Louise Fawcett	27.95	Irene Phillips	26.38
Javelin	Edith Halstead	32.85	(Austria) Erna Löw	32.72	Ruby Davis	28.49
1 mile walk	Constance Mason	7:47.8	Jeanne Probekk	8:06.8	Virna Horwood	8:13.4

== See also ==
- 1932 AAA Championships
