= 1933 WAAA Championships =

British athletics event

- Dates: 15 July
- Host city: London
- Venue: White City Stadium
- Level: Senior
- Type: Outdoor

The 1933 WAAA Championships were the national track and field championships for women in the United Kingdom.

The event was held at White City Stadium, London, on 15 July 1933.

== Results ==
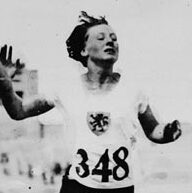
Bets ter Horst was one of four Dutch athletes to medal at the Championships

Event	Gold		Silver		Bronze	
100 metres	Eileen Hiscock	12.2 =NR	Nellie Halstead	1½ yards	Lillian Chalmers	1 yard
200 metres	Eileen Hiscock	25.8	Violet Olney	4 yards	Marjorie Pope	1½ yards
400 metres	Nellie Halstead	58.8	Violet Branch	59.5	Dorothy Bruty	61.0
800 metres	Ruth Christmas	2:23.0	Violet Humphries	2 yards	Dorothy Butterfield	15 yards
80 metres hurdles	Elsie Green	12.0	(Netherlands) Bets ter Horst	3 yards	Marjorie O'Kell	1 foot
High jump	Mary Milne	1.499	Dora Greenwood	1.473	Nellie Carrington	1.461
Long jump	Phyllis Bartholomew	5.40	Nellie Carrington	5.36	Josephine Matthews	5.36
Shot put	(Netherlands) Gien de Kock	10.26	(Netherlands) Dicky Munnikes	10.09	Kathleen Tilley	9.69
Discus throw	Ada Holland	33.21 NR	(Netherlands) Cor Pels	31.66	Joan Webster	31.55
Javelin	(Netherlands) Gien de Kock	36.11	Edith Halstead	35.22 (NR)	(Austria) Erna Löw	33.36
1600 metres walk	Jeanne Probekk	7:51.2	Jessie Howes	20 yards	Kitty Bellamy	

== See also ==
- 1933 AAA Championships
