= Nellie Carrington =

British high jumper

Personal information
- Nationality: British (English)
- Born: 27 August 1916 Poplar, London, England
- Died: 7 October 1998 (aged 82) Thurrock, England

Sport
- Sport: Athletics
- Event: high jump / long jump
- Club: Essex Ladies AC

Eleanor Elizabeth Carrington (27 August 1916 – 7 October 1998) was a British athlete who competed at the 1936 Summer Olympics.

== Biography ==
Carrington finished second behind Phyllis Bartholomew in the long jump event and third behind Mary Milne in the high jump event at the 1933 WAAA Championships.

Carrington finished second behind Ethel Raby in the long jump event at the 1935 WAAA Championships and was second again at the 1936 WAAA Championships in both the high jump and long jump events.

At the 1936 Olympic Games in Berlin, she competed in the women's high jump competition.
