= 1931 WAAA Championships =

British athletics event

- Dates: 11 July
- Host city: London
- Venue: Stamford Bridge
- Level: Senior
- Type: Outdoor

The 1931 WAAA Championships were the national track and field championships for women in the United Kingdom.

The event was held at Stamford Bridge, London, on 11 July 1931. Nellie Halstead and Constance Mason both set up new world records, repeating their feat from the previous year and Elsie Green set a new world record in the 80 metres hurdles event.

== Results ==
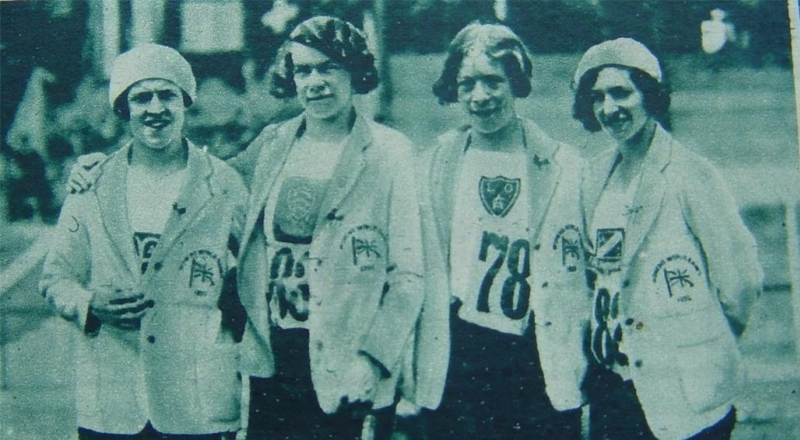
Nellie Halstead (far right) won three titles

Event	Gold		Silver		Bronze	
100 yards	Nellie Halstead	11.4	Ivy Walker	11.6e	Gwendoline Porter	11.6e
220 yards	Nellie Halstead	25.5	Ivy Walker	5 yards	Eileen Hiscock	3 yards
440 yards	Nellie Halstead	58.8 WR	Dorothy Butterfield	easily	Vera Rudd	
880 yards	Gladys Lunn	2:22.4	Ruth Christmas	20 yards	Dorothy Butterfield	10 yards
80 metres hurdles	Elsie Green	12.0 WR	Kathleen Tiffen	1 yard	Muriel Cornell	12.3e
High jump	Marjorie O'Kell	1.499	E. Hooper	1.499	Hilda Thorogood	1.473
Long jump	Muriel Cornell	5.51	Mary Seary	5.32	Ethel Slaughter	5.10
Shot put	Irene Phillips	9.69 NR	Elsie Otway	8.80	Nellie Purvey	8.44
Discus throw	Irene Phillips	29.79	Ada Holland	27.02	Louise Fawcett	26.58
Javelin	Louise Fawcett	29.26	Edith Halstead	27.20	Maud Scorah	26.22
1 mile walk	Constance Mason	7:45.6 WR	Lucy Howes		E. Gutteridge	
440-yard relay	London Olympiades AC	3.51.1/5	Middlesex Ladies	6 yd	Manchester AC	inches

== See also ==
- 1931 AAA Championships
