= Walter Ingham =

British skiing entrepreneur

Walter Ingham (1914-2000) was a UK pioneer and entrepreneur of the skiing holiday. After World War II, Britain saw an emerging demand for organised escorted foreign holidays. He helped develop the skiing marketplace in Britain and the "package holiday".

== Biography ==
Walter John Ingham was born in Vienna on 29 May 1914. He was the second son of Frank Ingham and Lillian Grace, née Robinson, who had eloped to Vienna from Burnley, Lancashire in 1909. The family stayed in Vienna during World War I where Frank Ingham was initially interned and then subject effectively to house arrest. The family came back to England in 1919 but returned to Vienna in 1920. It was at school in Austria, with the mountains as his playground, that his passion for skiing, climbing and sailing was born. In 1932, Ingham returned to England to work as a junior salesman for Remington Typewriters (his father worked as their south-east European manager), In 1934, with £25 in capital, Ingham advertised a ‘private ski party to Ski the Tyrol – 14 days for 12 guineas’, in a British National newspaper, Daily Telegraph, inviting participants to join him on a Christmas adventure to Schoenburg, Austrian Tyrol. He discovered that if he took a party of 15 people to the Alps, he could get a free rail ticket and hotel room for himself. The trip was a success – five more to Kuhtai, Obergurgl, Gerlos and other resorts followed - and he banked £80 by the end of the ski season. He organised transport, food, accommodation, ski hire and worked with a local ski instructor teaching the group how to ski.

The business grew with skiing and ski mountaineering in the winter and walking in the summer where overseas reps were recruited from previous customers. Ingham would meet the group at Victoria Station, take them out to wherever they were going and after two weeks he would bring them back, have a quick wash and brush up at the station and collect the next group. In the summer Ingham would take coach parties, primarily around France, and between seasons, he visited the hotels and generally made arrangements for the coming season.

At the time, in terms of travel competition, Henry Lunn of ‘Lunn Poly’ fame, was already taking groups of public school and university educated skiers to Switzerland. His biggest rivalry however was with Erna Low. She was born Erna Löwe in Vienna, threw the javelin for Austria, and came to London in 1930 to work on a doctoral thesis about the Victorian poet, Lord de Tabley. It was mainly out of a need to pay for trips home that, in January 1932, she advertised similarly for clients to take skiing.

Upon retirement in 1936, Ingham’s father joined him and together they created F&W Ingham and operated business from a one room office in Arcade House at 27 Old Bond Street.

In 1938 Ingham extended his holiday offering from Austria to the French Alps and French seaside resorts. Strategically, this was a good move for when Germany annexed Austria he was able to fully concentrate his business in France.

Later that year, Ingham was back in France as a Lance Corporal, and married his wife Barbara in Le Mans. The wedding was on 20 April. Thereafter, they never referred to their anniversary, calling it "Hitler's birthday" instead which was the same date. Ingham later served in North Africa and after the Nazi defeat - he spoke fluent German with a Viennese accent - was sent to Austria to work with the control commission.

When Ingham emerged from the army with the rank of Major in 1948, he reset up his travel business, renting a one room office at 143 New Bond Street, with ex-War Department trestle tables covered with military blankets.

During the following 14 years, Inghams grew steadily, eventually employing 80 full-time staff and 30 overseas representatives, and carrying 14,000 people abroad each year.

Ingham operated snow trains to the Alps, sharing space with Erna Low, and introduced dancing cars so that skiers could start their revelling during the 24-hour journey to the slopes. The trains carried 400 skiers via Calais or Dieppe to the Austrian Arlberg, and on to Zell am See. By the early 1950s, Inghams was flying customers to the Alps in propeller-driven DC-3 aircraft.

Whilst Ingham has long been credited as the man who took Britain skiing, it is almost fitting that Eileen Knowles, daughter of Maurice Knowles (one of Ingham’s first guides) with her Austrian husband, Karl Fuchs, were the first to bring skiing to Scotland.

== Retirement ==
In 1962 Ingham decided to hang up his skis, having worked in the skiing industry over 28 years. He sold to Hotelplan, a Swiss company, and enjoyed the remainder of his days living on the island of Elba (where in 1814 Napoleon 'enjoyed' his enforced ‘exile’) in pursuit of his other passion, sailing. His appreciation of classical music was also indulged by his friendship with conductor Charles Mackerras, who too had a house on the island.

He died on 18 July 2000, aged 86, survived by two sons and a daughter.

== History: Timeline ==
- 1934 – Walter Ingham advertises in national newspapers for a private ski party to join him on a trip to Austria over the Christmas period. He promotes the holiday in the Personal Column of The Times. 14 days for 12 guineas – ‘Private Party to Ski the Tyrol’. (Christmas)
- 1935 - Summer ‘Rucksack’ holidays organized by Walter Ingham to the Oetzal mountains with ‘hut to hut’ mountaineering holidays.
- 1936 – Walter Ingham rents one-room office in Arcade House, Bond Street to sell holidays. Walter’s father joins him and they create F&W Ingham.
- 1936 - Extends holiday offering to French Alps and French seaside resorts and coach tours.
- 1936 – Inghams holidays are advertised in the Daily Telegraph for 17 guineas for 16 days. The advert invited customers for an interview.
- 1938 – Terminates holidays to Austria when it becomes annexed by Germany (in March).
- 1939 – World War II breaks out and Walter Ingham joins the army
- 1948 – Launches first post-war ski-party to the Dortmund Chalet of the Austrian Alpine Club in the Tyrol (Christmas).
- 1950 - First snow trains to the Alps and introduced dancing cars in which customers would party the night away as they rattled across the continent.
- 1955 – Inghams joins the Association of British Travel Agents (ABTA)
- 1957 - Inghams starts Lakes and Mountains programme.
- 1963 – Walter Ingham sells Inghams to Hotelplan. Retires to the island of Elba.
- 2000 - Walter Ingham dies.
