= Doris Razzell =

English athlete

Personal information
- Nationality: British (English)
- Born: 29 June 1911 Edmonton, London, England
- Died: 24 August 2011 (aged 100) Chichester, England

Sport
- Sport: Athletics
- Event: Long jump
- Club: North London Harriers

Doris Rose Razzell (29 June 1911 – 24 August 2011) was a female athlete who competed for England.

== Biography ==
Razzell was a member of the North London Harriers and finished third behind Phyllis Bartholomew at both the 1932 WAAA Championships and 1934 WAAA Championships.

She also finished runner-up behind Bartholomew at the 1934 Southern Championships.

She represented England at the 1934 British Empire Games in London, where she competed in the long jump event.

Shortly after the Games, she married Leslie Honeyman in London and in 1939 they were living in Burnham-on-Crouch.
