= Dorothy Butterfield =

British athlete

Personal information
- Nationality: British (English)
- Born: 15 August 1909 Hendon, Middlesex, England
- Died: October 1991 (aged 82) Milton Keynes, Buckinghamshire, England

Sport
- Sport: Athletics
- Event: middle-distance
- Club: Middlesex LAC
Medal record
Women's Athletics
Representing England
British Empire Games
Bronze medal – third place	1934 London	880 yards

Dorothy Esther Butterfield married name Goddard (15 August 1909 – October 1991) was an English athlete who competed in the 1934 British Empire Games.

== Biography ==
Butterfield finished second behind Ellen Wright in the 440 yards event at the 1930 WAAA Championships. The following year, she finished second behind Nellie Halstead in the 440 yards event and third behind Gladys Lunn in the 880 yards event at the 1931 WAAA Championships. Further third place finishes ensued behind Gladys Lunn at the 1932 WAAA Championships and behind Ruth Christmas at the 1933 WAAA Championships.

At the 1934 Empire Games, she represented England, where she won the bronze medal in the 880 yards event.
