= Marie Mejzlíková =

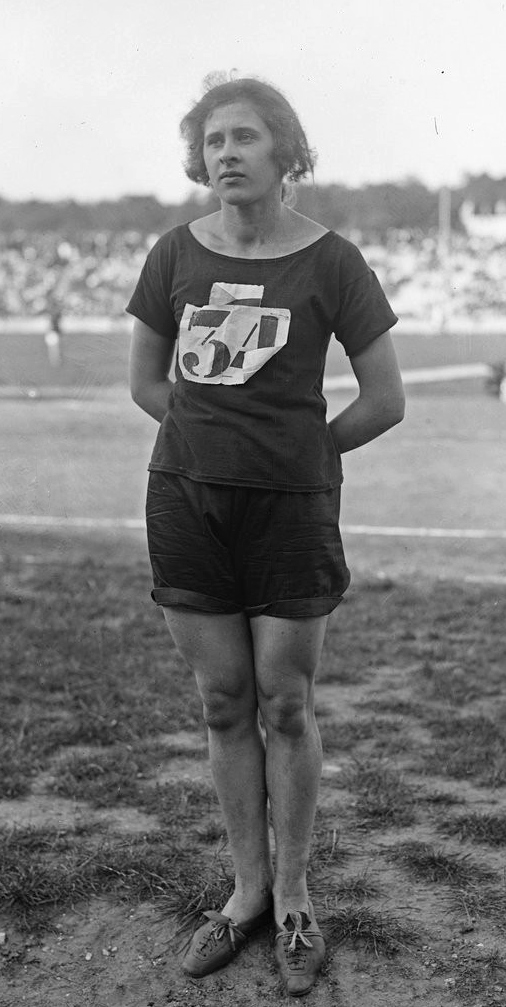
- Marie Mejzlíková at the 1922 Women's World Games

Personal information
- Born: Prague

Sport
- Sport: Athletics
- Event(s): 100 m, 200 m, long jump
Medal record
Representing Czech Republic
Women's World Games
Gold medal – first place	1922 Paris	60 m
Silver medal – second place	1922 Paris	100 yd

Marie Mejzlíková (later Majerová), born 13 December 1903 and died in 1994, was a Czechoslovak athlete, who competed in the long jump, sprint, and throwing events. She won the 60 m and finished second in the 100 yd at the 1922 Women's World Games. The same year she set the first officially recognized world records in the long jump (5.16 m) and 100 m events. On 21 May 1922 she also set the first world record in Women's 4 x 100 metres relay (with Marie Mejzlíková I, Marie Bakovská, Marie Jirásková and Marie Mejzlíková II).

She often competed alongside another Czechoslovak sprinter Marie Mejzlíková, they are usually named as Marie Mejzlíková I (born 1902) and Marie Mejzlíková II in the athletics lists.
