= Ethel Scott =

British sprinter (1907–1984)

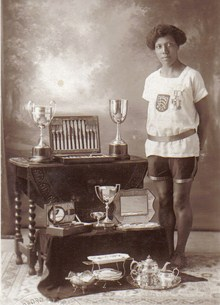

Personal information
- Nationality: British (English)
- Born: 22 October 1907
- Died: 1984 (aged 76–77)

Sport
- Sport: Athletics
- Event: Sprinting
- Club: Middlesex LAC
Medal record
Representing Great Britain
Women's Athletics
Women's World Games
Silver medal – second place	1930 Prague	4×100 metre relay

Ethel Scott (22 October 1907 – 1984) was the first black woman to represent Great Britain in an international athletics competition and specialised as a sprinter.

== Biography ==
Scott was born on 22 October 1907; she was the daughter of Jane (née Pilgrim) and David Emmanuel Scott. She had two brothers, Richard Walter and George Alexander, and one sister, Margery Gladys. Her father served in the Royal Naval Volunteer Reserve during World War I, but was killed in an accident on HMS Hogue in August 1914, at age 49. Scott was part of the Middlesex Ladies' Athletics Club.

Scott finished second behind Ivy Walker in the 100 yards event at the 1929 WAAA Championships, where Walker set a national record of 11.4 seconds.

On 30 August 1930, Scott set a personal best for the 60 metres at a track meet in Mitcham, London. Her time of 7.8 seconds was 2 tenths of a second off the world record of 7.6 seconds; it equalled the current British record, which had been set in 1922 by Mary Lines. Scott is 39th on a list of the top performers in this event before 1940. It is believed that her best time for the 100 yards of 11.1 seconds was set in 1930 at a meet in Arras, France.

The highlight of Scott's athletic career came in September 1930, when she was one of fifteen athletes chosen to represent Britain at the 1930 Women's World Games in Prague. The Women's World Games were created by Alice Milliat as an alternative to the Olympics, which at that time included only a limited program of events for women. Scott competed in the 60m sprint and the 4x100 relay. She won her heat in the first round of the 60 metre sprint on 6 September, beating Lisa Gelius of Germany in a photo finish in front of an audience of 15,000. However, she made little impression in the final on the following day, finishing out of the top six places. Her competitors included many of the most successful sprinters of the pre-1940 era: Stella Walasiewicz (POL), Lisa Gelius (GER), Kinue Hitomi (JAP), Ivy Walker (GB) and Marguerite Radideau (FRA).

The British 4x100 relay team, consisting of Ethel Scott, Ivy Walker, Eileen Hiscock and Daisy Ridgley, was more successful. The team completed their qualifying heat on 7 September in 49.7 seconds, and took the silver medal in the final the following day despite a time of 50.5 seconds. After the completion of the Women’s World Games, Scott and Ivy Walker travelled on to Berlin for another track meet, where they competed with two other British women as the “London Team”. The others were F. Latham and Muriel Cornell. This combination performed even better at Berlin, obtaining a time of 49.3 seconds in the 4x100 relay on 13 September 1930.

In May 1932, Scott won the Essex 100 yards Championship in a time of 12.3-5sec.

Scott attended the 1938 European Athletics Championships in Vienna.

Scott worked in the Civil Service and as a Medical Secretary until her retirement. She never married or had children and she died in 1984.
