= Elizabeth Stine =

American athlete (1905–1993)

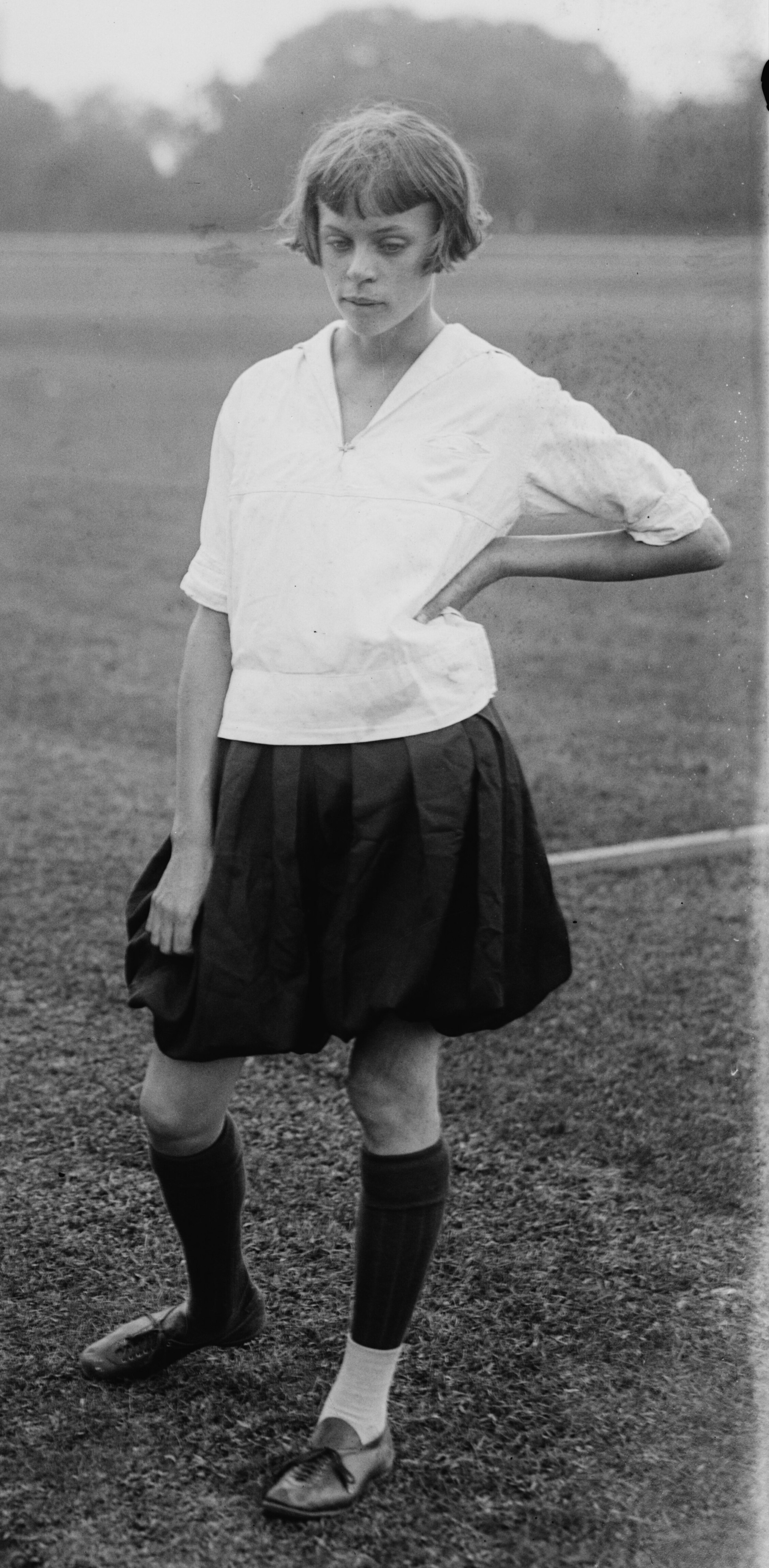
- Elizabeth Stine in 1922
- Born: Elizabeth Gertrude Stine; August 5, 1905; New York, New York, U.S.
- Died: November 15, 1993 (aged 88); Newark, New Jersey, U.S.
- Other name: Elizabeth Glasier
- Occupation: Athlete
- Known for: Silver medal, long jump, 1922 Women's World Games

Elizabeth Gertrude Stine Glasier (August 5, 1905 – November 15, 1993) was an American athlete, one of the thirteen members of the United States team at the 1922 Women's World Games in Paris. She won a silver medal in the long jump competition, and held world records for the hop, skip and jump, high jump, and running broad jump events in the mid-1920s.

== Early life and education ==
Stine was born in New York City and raised in Teaneck, New Jersey, the daughter of Thomas Arthur Stine and Consuelo Frost Stine. Her father was president of the board of education of the Hackensack Public Schools, and her mother was active in local politics and the YMCA. She graduated from Leonia High School, as did her teammate Maybelle Gilliland. Their high school coach Suzanne Becker became assistant coach of the United States team for the 1922 Women's World Games.

== Career ==
Stine set the world record for the hop, skip and jump event at the trials in Mamaroneck, New York, in 1922; she also placed in the high jump and the 100-yard dash at the trials. She told a 1922 newspaper that her goal was to be "the world's greatest all-around woman athlete." She was one of the younger members of the United States team at the 1922 Women's World Games in Paris. She won a silver medal in the long jump competition, behind British athlete Mary Lines and ahead of her American teammate Camille Sabie.

Stine continued competing in track and field events after Paris. In 1923, she was credited with the world record in high jump, after jumping 4 feet 10 1/4 inches (1.480 m) in a county-wide competition held in Englewood, New Jersey. She won the running broad jump event at the Metropolitan AAU tryouts in 1925, and won the high jump at the Metropolitan AAU championships that year. In 1926, at the outdoor national championships in Philadelphia, she placed second in the running high jump. Her 1925 record for the running broad jump, 17 feet 1/2 inch (5.194 m), was broken in 1927 by Elta Cartwright. In 1928, she competed in the New Jersey state championships as a member of the Paterson Recreation Club. She was a member of the Millrose Athletic Association in 1931.

== Personal life ==
Stine married businessman Frederick Charles Glasier in 1931; teammate Maybelle Gilliland was her maid of honor at the wedding. They had a son, Frederick. She died in 1993, at the age of 87, in Newark, New Jersey.
