= Violet Webb =

English track and field athlete

Personal information
- Nationality: British (English)
- Born: 3 February 1915 Willesden, England
- Died: 27 May 1999 (aged 84) Northwood, England
- Height: 173 cm (5 ft 8 in)
- Weight: 60 kg (132 lb)

Sport
- Sport: Athletics
- Event: hurdles / long jump
- Club: Ladies Polytechnic Club
Medal record
Women's athletics
Representing Great Britain
Olympic Games
Bronze medal – third place	1932 Los Angeles	4x100 m relay
Women's World Games
Bronze medal – third place	1934 London	80 metres hurdles
Representing England
British Empire Games
Bronze medal – third place	1934 London	Long jump

Violet Blanche Webb (later Simpson, 3 February 1915 – 27 May 1999) was an English track and field athlete who competed for Great Britain in the 1932 Summer Olympics and in the 1936 Summer Olympics.

== Biography ==
Webb born in Willesden, travelled to Los Angeles as one of five women entered by the Women's Amateur Athletic Association at the 1932 Los Angeles Summer Olympics as Britain's first female Olympians in athletics events. She finished fifth in the 80 metre hurdles event. She also featured in the 4x100 metre relay, where she replaced the injured Ethel Johnson, and won the bronze medal with her teammates, Eileen Hiscock, Gwendoline Porter and Nellie Halstead.

Webb finished second behind Elsie Green in the 80 metres hurdles event at the 1934 WAAA Championships.

Webb competed for England at the 1934 Empire Games, held in London, winning the bronze medal in the long jump. In the 80 metre hurdles, she was eliminated in the heats. She also competed at the Women's World Games of 1934, winning a bronze medal at 80 metre hurdles.

In 1936, Webb finished second again in the 80 metres hurdles at the 1936 WAAA Championships, behind South African Barbara Burke. Shortly afterwards at the Berlin Olympics, she was eliminated in the semi-finals of the 80 metre hurdles competition. Her daughter, Janet Simpson, won the same medal in the same event at the 1964 Summer Olympics in Tokyo.

She married Charles H. Simpson in 1937, and they were the parents of Janet Simpson and died in Northwood, London.
