= Nancy Voorhees =

American high jumper

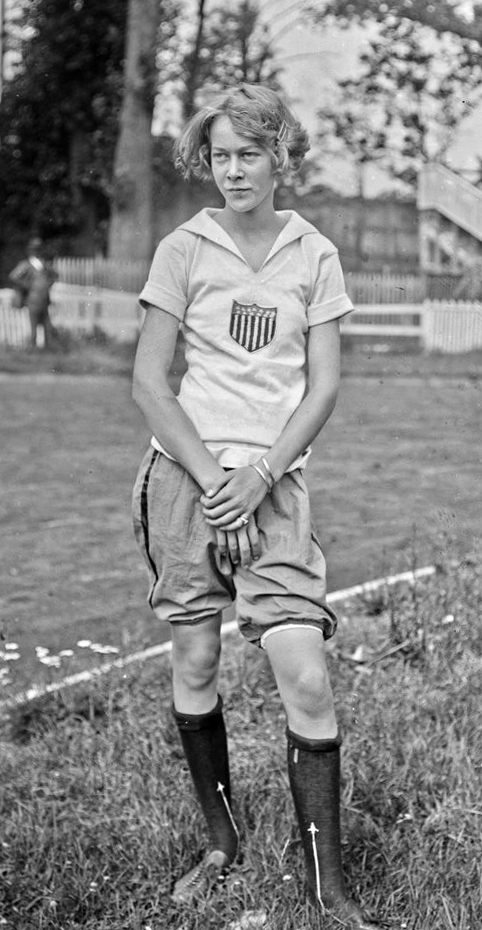
- Voorhees at the 1922 Women's World Games

Personal information
- Born: 4 January 1906 New York, United States
- Died: June 1988 (aged 82)

Sport
- Sport: Athletics
- Event: High jump

Achievements and titles
- Personal best: HJ – 1.46 m (1922)
Medal record
Representing the United States
Women's World Games
Gold medal – first place	1922 Paris	High jump

Nancy Voorhees (January 4, 1906 – June 1988) was an American high jumper. She won a gold medal at the 1922 Women's World Games, setting the first world record at 1.46 m. Her elder sister Louise competed alongside in the high jump at those Games. Nancy married C. Redington Barrett in 1930.
