= Hilda Thorogood =

British athlete

Personal information
- Nationality: British (English)

Sport
- Sport: Athletics
- Event: high jump
- Club: London Olympiades AC; Spartan LAC

Hilda Thorogood was a female athlete who competed for England at the 1934 British Empire Games in London.

== Biography ==
Thorogood finished second behind Marjorie O'Kell in the high jump event at the 1929 WAAA Championships. Two years later she finished third behind O'Kell at the 1931 WAAA Championships.

Thorogood finished third behind German Gretel Bergmann in the high jump event at the 1934 WAAA Championships. Shortly afterwards at the 1934 Empire Games, Thorogood competed for England in the high jump competition.
