= Gwendoline Porter =

British sprinter (1902–1993)

Personal information
- Nationality: British (English)
- Born: 25 April 1902 Ilford, London
- Died: 29 August 1993 (aged 91) Battle, England

Sport
- Sport: Athletics
- Event: Sprints
- Club: London Olympiades AC
Medal record
Representing Great Britain
Women's Athletics
Women's World Games
Gold medal – first place	1922 Paris	4×110 yd
Olympic Games
Bronze medal – third place	1932 Los Angeles	4×100 m relay

Gwendoline Alice Porter (25 April 1902 – 29 August 1993) was a British track and field athlete who competed mainly in the 100 metres.

== Biography ==
She was born in Ilford, London. She worked in the head office of an insurance company.

In 1922 she participated at the Women's Olympiad in Paris and won the gold medal in the 4×110 yds relay (with Mary Lines, Nora Callebout, Daisy Leach and Porter as fourth runner) setting a new world record.

Porter finished third behind Nellie Halstead in the 100 yards event at the 1931 WAAA Championships and third behind Ethel Johnson in the 100 yards event at the 1932 WAAA Championships.

Shortly afterwards, she was one of five women entered by the Women's Amateur Athletic Association at the 1932 Los Angeles Summer Olympics as Britain's first female Olympians in athletics events, together with Ethel Johnson, Eileen Hiscock, Nellie Halstead, and seventeen-year-old Violet Webb. They sailed for five days from Southampton to Quebec and then travelled a further 3000 miles by train before arriving in Los Angeles. In the 4 x 100 metres women's relay she won the bronze medal with her teammates Eileen Hiscock, Violet Webb (replacing the injured Johnson) and Nellie Halstead. In the women's 100 metres she came 4th in her heat.
