= Nora Callebout =

British track athlete (1895–1995)

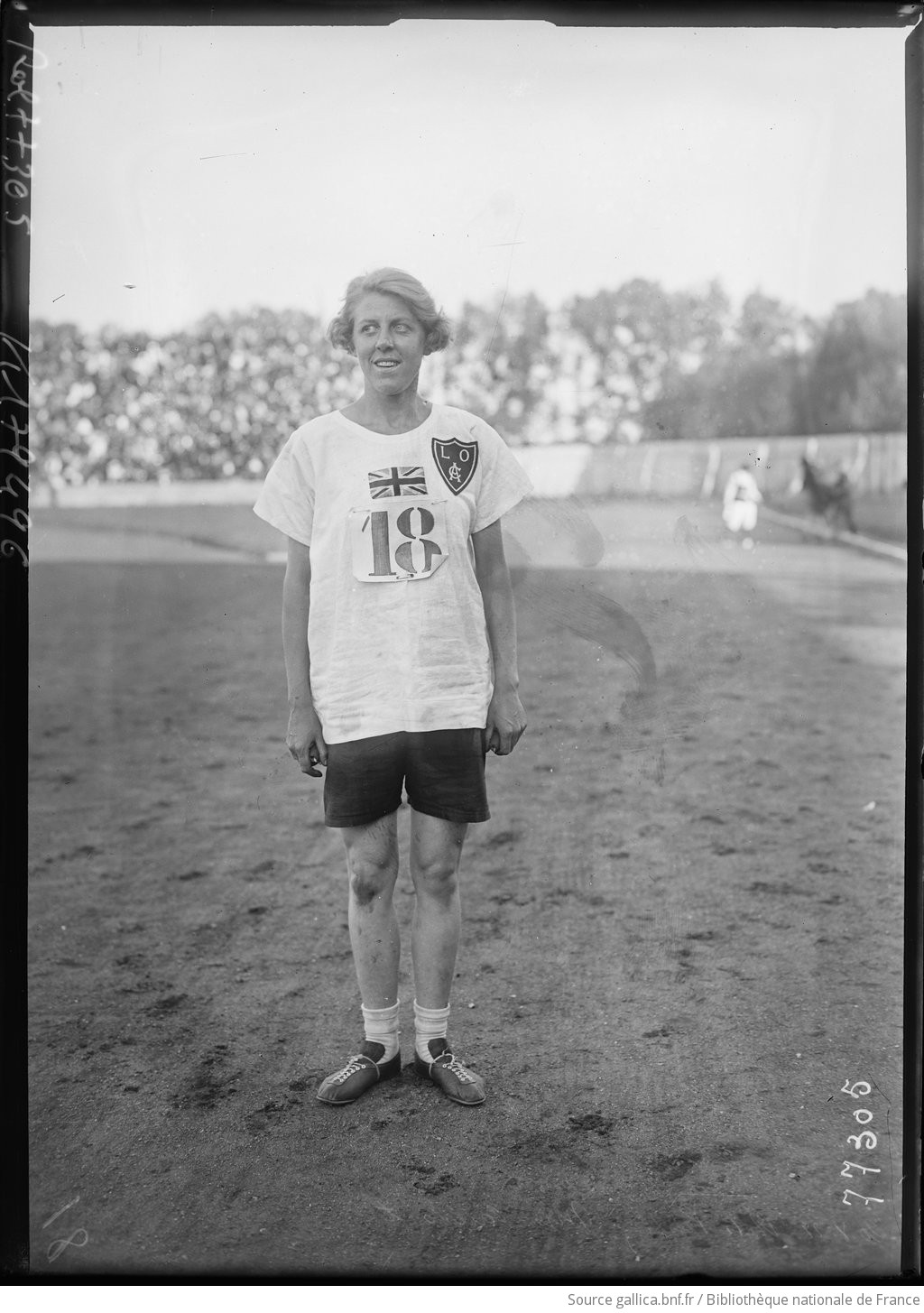
- Callebout in 1922

Personal information
- Born: 29 April 1895
- Died: 1 January 1995 (aged 99)
- Education: Royal Holloway

Sport
- Sport: Athletics
- Events: 60–300m, relay
- Club: London Olympiades
Medal record
Representing United Kingdom
Women's World Games
| Bronze medal – third place | 1922 Paris | 60 m |
| Silver medal – second place | 1922 Paris | 4×75m |
| Gold medal – first place | 1922 Paris | 60 m |
| Gold medal – first place | 1922 Paris | 4×1 laps |
| Gold medal – first place | 1922 Paris | 100 yd |
| Gold medal – first place | 1922 Paris | 4×110 yd |
| Gold medal – first place | 1923 Monte Carlo | 200 m |
| Gold medal – first place | 1923 Monte Carlo | 4×1 laps |
| Gold medal – first place | 1923 Monte Carlo | 4×100 m |
| Gold medal – first place | 1923 Monte Carlo | 60 m |

Nora Eveline Callebout (1895 – 1995) was a British track athlete who won ten medals across two Women's World Games, a precursor to women's sports entering the Olympics and was part of the record-setting 4×110 yds relay team in 1922.

== Life ==
Callebout graduated from Holloway College, University of London, in 1917 with a Class I BA in mathematics.

At the first Women's World Games in Paris in 1922, originally called the 'Women's Olympic Games' until objections from the Olympic Committee, Callebout won six medals in track events. She took bronze in the 60-metre dash, silver in the 4×100 m relay, and gold in four events: the 60m, 4×1 175 m laps, 100 yards, and the 4×110 yards. In that event she set a world record of 51.8 seconds along with Gwendoline Porter, Daisy Leach, and team captain Mary Lines.

A week after the Games, Callebout travelled to Brussels with the London Olympiades Athletic Club to compete in eight events against Femina Sports Club of Brussels and the Paris Club Femina AC. The London Olympiades dominated the match, with Callebout setting two Belgian records (10.6 seconds in the 80m and 45.4 seconds in the 300m).

In 1922, Callebout became the national 100 yards champion.

Returning to the second World Games in Monte Carlo in 1923, Callebout again won four golds, this time in 60m, 200m, 4×100m and 4×1 laps. In 1923, she returned to university and gained an MA.

In 1929, she was elected honorary secretary of the Women's Amateur Athletic Association.

Callebout's married name was Coates.
