= Yvonne Gancel =

French javelin thrower

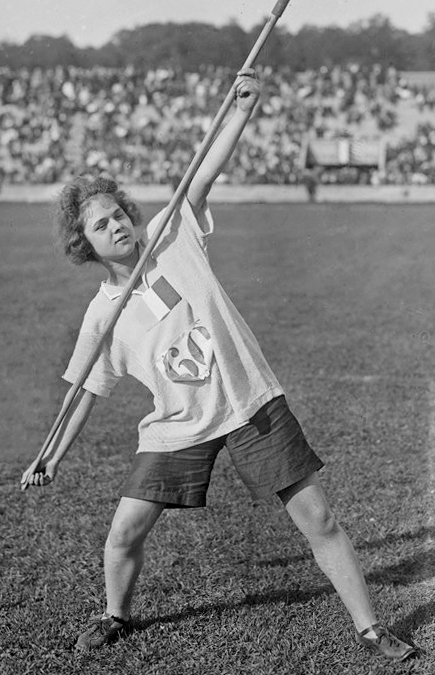
- Gancel at the 1922 Women's World Games

Sport
- Sport: Athletics
- Event: javelin throw
Medal record
Representing France
Women's World Games
Silver medal – second place	1922 Paris	Javelin throw

Yvonne Gancel was a French javelin thrower, who won a silver medal at the 1922 Women's World Games.
