= 1922 Women's World Games =

- Host city: Paris
- Country: France
- Dates: August 20, 1922

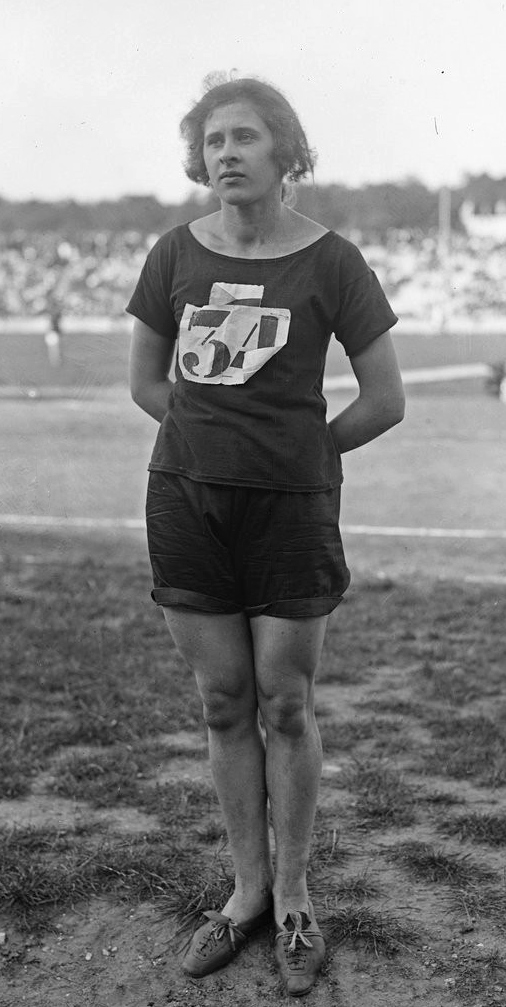
Marie Mejzlíková II

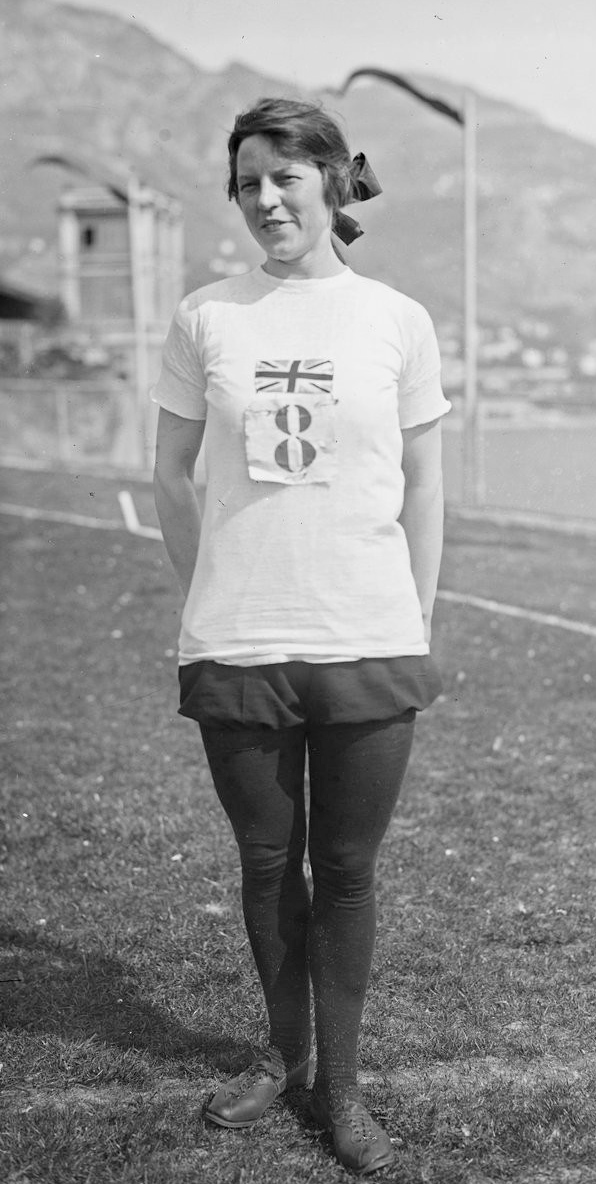
Mary Lines

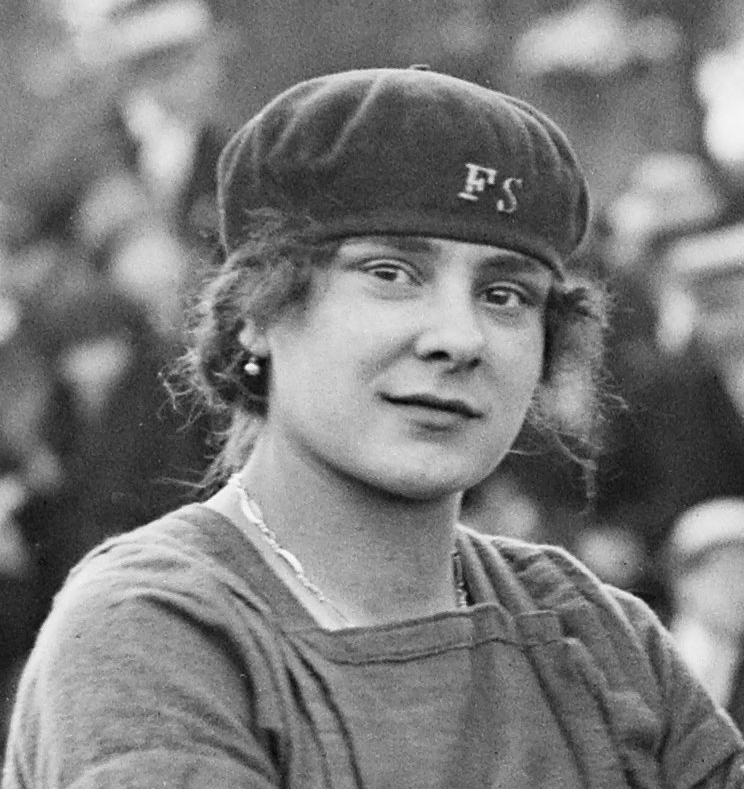
Lucie Bréard

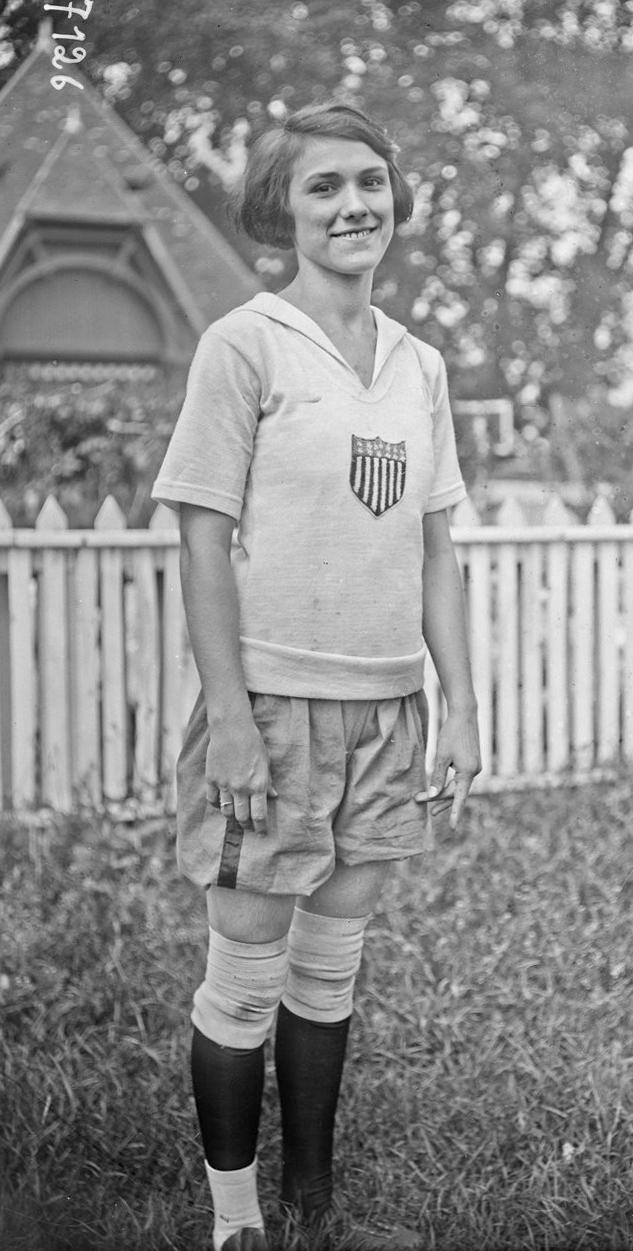
Camille Sabie

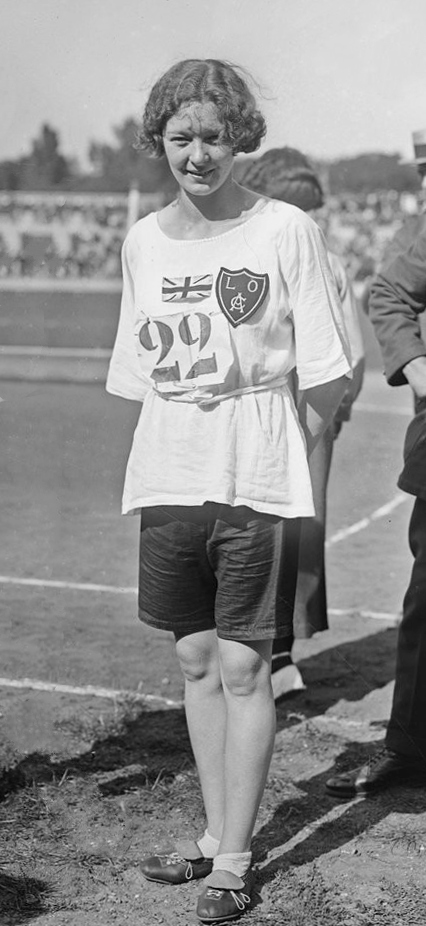
Hilda Hatt

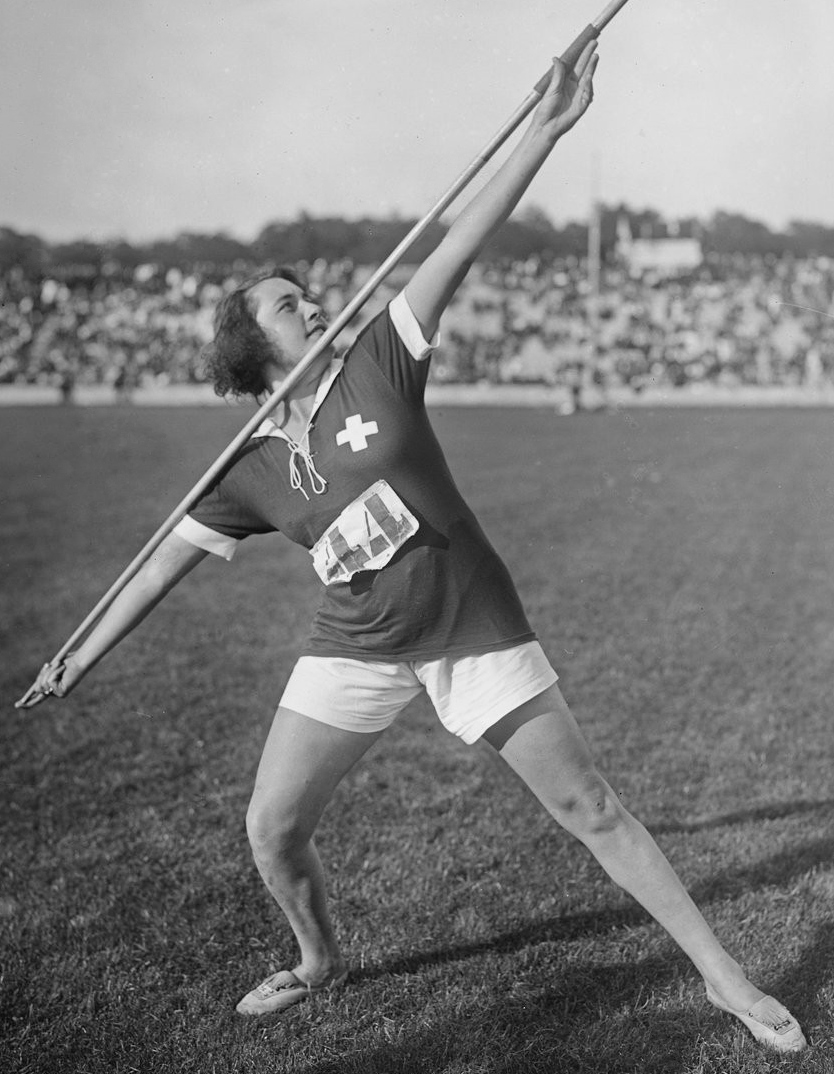
Francesca Pianzola

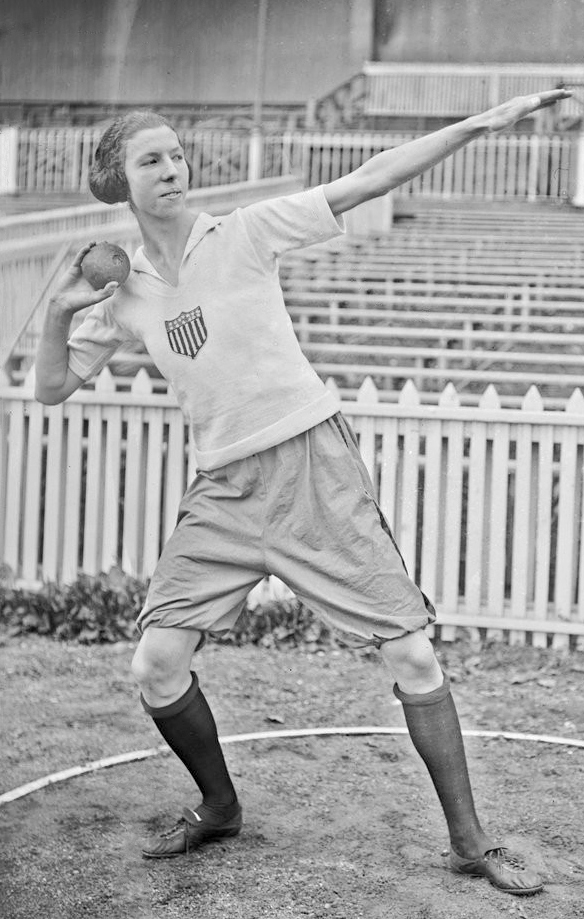
Lucile Godbold

The 1922 Women's World Games (French Jeux Olympiques Féminins, also "Women's Olympic Games") were the first regular international Women's World Games and the first Track and field competitions for women. The tournament was held on a single day on August 20, 1922. at the Pershing Stadium in Paris.

== Events ==
The games were organized by the Fédération Sportive Féminine Internationale under Alice Milliat as a response to the refusal of the International Olympic Committee to include women's events in the 1924 Olympic Games. (Note: Women's teams from universities in the United Kingdom initiated women's inter-varsity competition in 1921 and the Inter-Varsity Athletics Board (IVAB) in England held its first inter-varsity track and field competition for women in 1922.)

The games were attended by 77 participants from 5 nations: Czechoslovakia, France (32 athletes), Great Britain, Switzerland and the USA (13 athletes). Members of the American team were: Kathryn Agar, Florieda Batson, Maybelle Gilliland, Lucile Godbold, Esther Green, Anne Harwick, Frances Mead, Maud Rosenbaum, Camille Sabie, Janet Snow, Elizabeth Stine, Louise Voorhees and Nancy Voorhees.

The athletes competed in 11 events: running (60 metres, 100 yards, 300 metres, 1000 metres, 4 x 110 yards relay and hurdling 100 yards), high jump, long jump, standing long jump, javelin and shot put.

The tournament was opened with an olympic style ceremony. The games attracted an audience of 20,000 spectators and 18 world records were set.

== Medal summary ==
Event	Gold		Silver		Bronze	
60 m	Marie Mejzlikova II; Czechoslovakia	7.6	Mary Lines; United Kingdom	7.7	Nora Callebout; United Kingdom	7.8
100 yds	Nora Callebout; United Kingdom	12.0	Marie Mejzlikova II; Czechoslovakia	?	Mary Lines; United Kingdom	?
300 m	Mary Lines; United Kingdom	44.8	Alice Cast; Great Britain	?	André Darreau; France	?
1000 m	Lucie Bréard; France	3:12.0	Georgette Lenoir; France	3:12.2	Phylis Hall; Great Britain	?
100 yds hurdles	Camille Sabie; USA	14.4	Hilda Hatt; United Kingdom	14.8	Geneviève Laloz; France	15.0
4×110 yds relay	United Kingdom; Mary Lines; Nora Callebout; Daisy Leach; Gwendoline Porter	51.8	France; Lucie Prost; Germaine Robin; Yvonne De Wynne; Louise Noeppel	51.2	Czechoslovakia	52.8
High jump	Hilda Hatt; United Kingdom Nancy Voorhees; USA	1.46 m	Not awarded		Ivy Lowman; Great Britain	1.42 m
Long jump	Mary Lines; United Kingdom	5.06 m	Elizabeth Stine; USA	5.025 m	Camille Sabie; USA	4.96 m
Standing long jump	Camille Sabie; USA	2.485 m	Mary Hughes; United Kingdom	2.405 m	Henriette Comte-Anavoisard; France	2.34 m
Two-handed shot put^{[nb]}	Lucile Godbold; USA	20.22 m	Violette Gourard-Morris; France	19.85 m	Maud Rosenbaum; USA	17.37 m
Two-handed javelin throw^{[nb]}	Francesca Pianzola; Switzerland	43.24 m	Yvonne Gancel; France	41.62 m	Lucile Godbold; USA	39.70 m

- ^{nb} Each athlete in the shot put and javelin throw events threw using their right hand, then their left. Their final mark was the total of the best mark with their right-handed throw and the best mark with their left-handed throw.

== Points table ==
Place	Nation	Points
1	United Kingdom	50
2	USA	31
3	France	29
4	Czechoslovakia	12
5	Switzerland	6

== Legacy ==
A Women's Olympiad was held in Monaco in 1923. The next edition of the Games were held in 1926.

The first women's national championships in track and field were held after the inaugural 1922 Women's World Games and the 1921, 1922 and 1923 Women's Olympiads. In the United Kingdom, the Women's Amateur Athletic Association was founded in 1922 and held the first WAAA Championships the following year. In the United States, the 1923 USA Outdoor Track and Field Championships included a women's competition for the first time.
