= Gien de Kock =

Dutch javelin thrower

Personal information
- Nationality: Dutch
- Born: 21 February 1908 Amsterdam, Netherlands
- Died: 14 February 1998 (aged 89) Amsterdam, Netherlands

Sport
- Sport: Athletics
- Event: Javelin throw / shot put
- Club: ADA, Amsterdam

Clasina Gien de Kock (21 February 1908 – 14 February 1998) was a Dutch athlete who competed in the 1936 Summer Olympics.

== Biography ==
De Kock won the British WAAA Championships titles in the shot put and javelin throw events at the 1933 WAAA Championships.

At the 1936 Olympic Games in Berlin, she competed in the women's javelin throw.
