= Lucile Godbold =

American track and field athlete

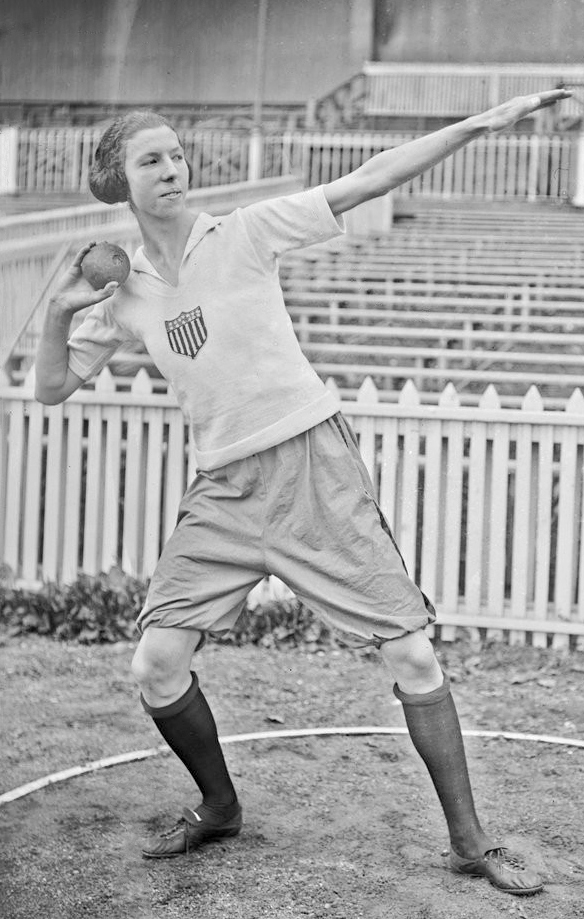
- Godbold at the 1922 Women's World Games

Personal information
- Born: May 31, 1900 Marion County, South Carolina, United States
- Died: April 5, 1981 (aged 80) Columbia, South Carolina, United States
- Education: Winthrop College
- Height: 6 ft (1.8 m)

Sport
- Sport: Athletics
- Event(s): Shot put, discus throw, javelin throw, 100–1000 m, long jump

Achievements and titles
- Personal best(s): SP – 8.80 m (1921); DT – 29.26 m (1922); JT – 23.13 m (1922); 200 m – 28.2 (1922); 800 m – 2:35.0 (1922); LJ – 4.52 m (1922)
Medal record
Representing United States
Women's World Games
Gold medal – first place	1922 Paris	Shot put
Bronze medal – third place	1922 Paris	Javelin

Lucile Ellerbe Godbold (May 31, 1900 – April 5, 1981) was an American track and field athlete. She competed in the long jump and several running and throwing events at the 1922 Women's World Games, also known as the First International Games for Women, and won a gold medal in the shot put and a bronze in the javelin throw; she finished fourth in the 300 m and 1000 m races. She won a total of six medals, which was more than any other competitor.

== Early life ==
Godbold was born in Marion County, South Carolina, and raised in Estill, the daughter of W. A. Godbold. Her older sister Sarah was also an athlete. Their mother taught calisthenics, their cousin Frank Ellerbe was a professional baseball player, and their uncle William Haselden Ellerbe was governor of South Carolina from 1897 to 1899.

== Athletic record ==
Godbold broke records in several events at the Winthrop Track Meet in 1920. She finished first in the basketball throw and second in the hop, skip, and jump event at Mamaroneck, New York, ahead of the Women's World Games. She competed in the long jump and several running and throwing events at the 1922 Women's World Games in Paris. She won a gold medal in the shot put and a bronze in the javelin throw; she finished fourth in the 300 m and 1000 m races. She won a total of six medals, which was more than any other competitor.

== Career ==
In 1922, Godbold graduated in physical education from the Winthrop College and in September of that year she began a 58-year teaching career at Columbia College in Columbia, South Carolina, where she also coached basketball, volleyball, tennis, track and field, and hockey. Her sister taught physical education and coached basketball at Chicora College. Together the Godbolds ran a summer sports camp for girls in the Blue Ridge Mountains, and organized a women's basketball league so their teams would have a chance to play intercollegiate sports.

"Miss Ludy", as she was affectionately known, became a legend at Columbia College. An annual touch football game was begun by the students in her honor and was named the "Ludy Bowl." Although the exact date is uncertain, it is believed the first Ludy Bowl took place on the campus of the college somewhere between 1952 and 1955 and is still played today during the college's Homecoming Weekend.

In 1961, Godbold became the first woman to be inducted into the South Carolina Athletics Hall of Fame. In 1971 Columbia College's new physical education center was named in her honor. She retired in 1980.

== Death and legacy ==
Godbold died in 1981, at the age of 80, in Columbia, South Carolina. In 1982, a historical marker was placed in Estill to tell her story. In 2000 she was named a Distinguished Alumna of Winthrop University.
