= Phyllis Goad =

English hurdler (1908–1974)

Personal information
- Nationality: British (English)
- Born: 27 August 1908 Brixham, Devon, England
- Died: 10 June 1974 (aged 65) Greenwich, Greater London, England

Sport
- Sport: Athletics
- Event: hurdles
- Club: Atalanta AC

Phyllis Brenda Goad (27 August 1908 – 10 June 1974) was a female athlete who competed for England at the 1934 British Empire Games in London.

== Biography ==
Goad finished third behind Elsie Green in the 80 metres hurdles event at the 1932 WAAA Championships.

Green competed for England in the 80 metres hurdles competition.
