= Ida Jones (athlete) =

British athlete

Personal information
- Nationality: British (English)
- Born: 6 August 1911

Sport
- Sport: Athletics
- Event: 800 metres
- Club: Liverpool University AC
Medal record
Women's Athletics
Representing England
British Empire Games
Silver medal – second place	1934 London	880 yards

Ida Jones (born 6 August 1911, date of death unknown) was an English athlete who competed in the 1934 British Empire Games.

== Biography ==
Jones finished second behind Gladys Lunn in the 800 metres event at the 1934 WAAA Championships.

Jones represented England at the 1934 Empire Games, where she won the silver medal in the 880 yards event.
