= Anne Harwick =

American athlete

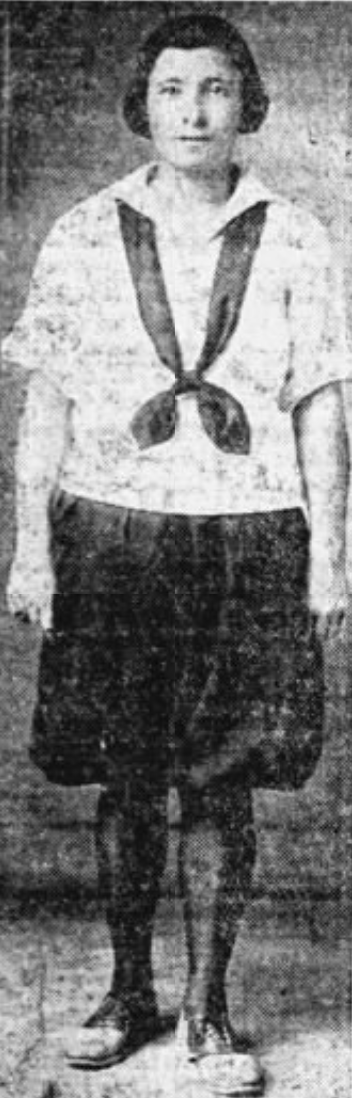
- Anne Harwick, from a 1922 publication
- Born: Anne Louise Harwick; May 13, 1899; Jacksonville, Florida, U.S.
- Died: April 25, 1974 (aged 74); Charlottesville, Virginia, U.S.
- Occupation(s): Athlete, social worker, writer
- Known for: 1922 Women's World Games

Anne Louise Harwick (May 13, 1899 – April 25, 1974) was an American athlete from Florida, who competed at the 1922 Women's World Games. She won a silver medal in the baseball throw event.

== Early life and education ==
Harwick was born in Jacksonville and lived in Miami, the daughter of William Henry Harwick and Ellen Theresa Perry Harwick. She graduated from the Florida State College for Women in 1922. She was a star athlete in multiple college sports, including tennis, baseball, basketball, running, shotput, and javelin. In 1952, she earned a master's degree in social work from Tulane University.

== Career ==
=== Sports ===
At trials in Mamaroneck, New York, Harwick broke a world record in javelin throw, and qualified for the United States team for the 1922 Women's World Games in Paris. Katherine Montgomery, physical education instructor at Florida State College for Women, helped her raise funds to attend the event. "It will be interesting to many to learn that Miss Harwick is left handed," reported a 1922 newspaper, "but says that she is bringing her right hand up to the left hand in strength, and that she feels she will not be handicapped on account of being left handed." (At the time, javelin and shotput scores were based on athletes' best throw with both hands.)

Although she expected to compete in the javelin event, she suffered an injury in training, and had to withdraw from that competition. Instead, she ran in the 300-meter race, and won a silver medal in the baseball throw, an exhibition event.

In fall 1922, Harwick became assistant athletic director at Oaksmere, a school for girls run by Winifred Edgerton Merrill in Mamaroneck. In 1924, she was Florida state champion in women's tennis. and in 1930, she was runner-up.

=== Later work ===
Harwick's post-sports career was in various jobs, including real estate and secretarial positions, social work and writing. She was director of social services at the University of Alabama Medical Center in the 1940s and 1950s, and a medical social worker at Blue Ridge Sanatorium in Charlottesville, Virginia, from 1952 to 1966. Harwick wrote a sports column for a Florida newspaper, and wrote a novel set in Jacksonville, Possum Trot (1968). She also patented a physical therapy device for hand and arm rehabilitation.

== Personal life ==
Harwick was briefly married in the 1930s. She died in 1974, at the age of 74, at a hospital in Charlottesville.
