= Kathryn Agar =

American athlete (1902–1987)

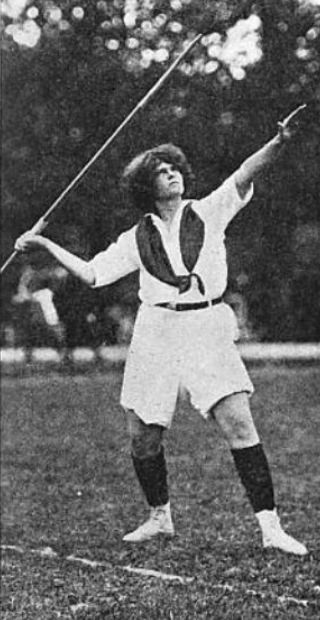
- Kathryn Agar, from a 1922 publication
- Born: 1902; Chicago, Illinois, U.S.
- Died: March 1987 (aged 84–85); Lake Forest, Illinois, U.S.
- Other names: Kathryn Jaicks, Catherine Agar
- Occupation(s): Athlete, businesswoman
- Known for: 1922 Women's World Games
- Relatives: John Agar (nephew)

Kathryn Agar Jaicks (April 3, 1902 – March 1987) was an American athlete and businesswoman. She was one of the thirteen athletes to represent the United States at the 1922 Women's World Games in Paris.

== Early life and education ==
Agar was born in Chicago, the daughter of James Scanlon Agar and Minnie Adele Dye Agar. Her father owned a meatpacking company. She graduated from the Faulkner School for Girls in Chicago, and attended the Oaksmere School in New York. Actor John Agar was her nephew.

== Career ==
Agar and her older sister Louise were both known as athletes in Chicago as teenagers. She qualified for the United States team at 1922 Women's World Games in Paris when she set the new American record for the javelin throw at Mamaroneck. She also played basketball, ran on a relay team, and participated in the baseball throw events at the Paris games. The team of thirteen athletes appeared in newspapers across the United States, at a time of public and medical interest in the merits of running as an exercise for women.

Later in life, Jaicks ran the Lake Forest office of Quinlan and Tyson, a Chicago real estate company.

== Personal life ==
In the late 1920s, Agar married her older sister Ruth's widower, contractor Wilson Askew Jaicks. She became a mother to her three young nephews, including Agar Jaicks, a Democratic Party organizer in San Francisco. Her daughter Nancy Jaicks Alexander was an Episcopalian church worker who founded a prison hospice program in California. Her husband died in 1967, and she died in 1987, at the age of 84, at a hospital in Lake Forest, Illinois.
