= Maybelle Gilliland =

American athlete

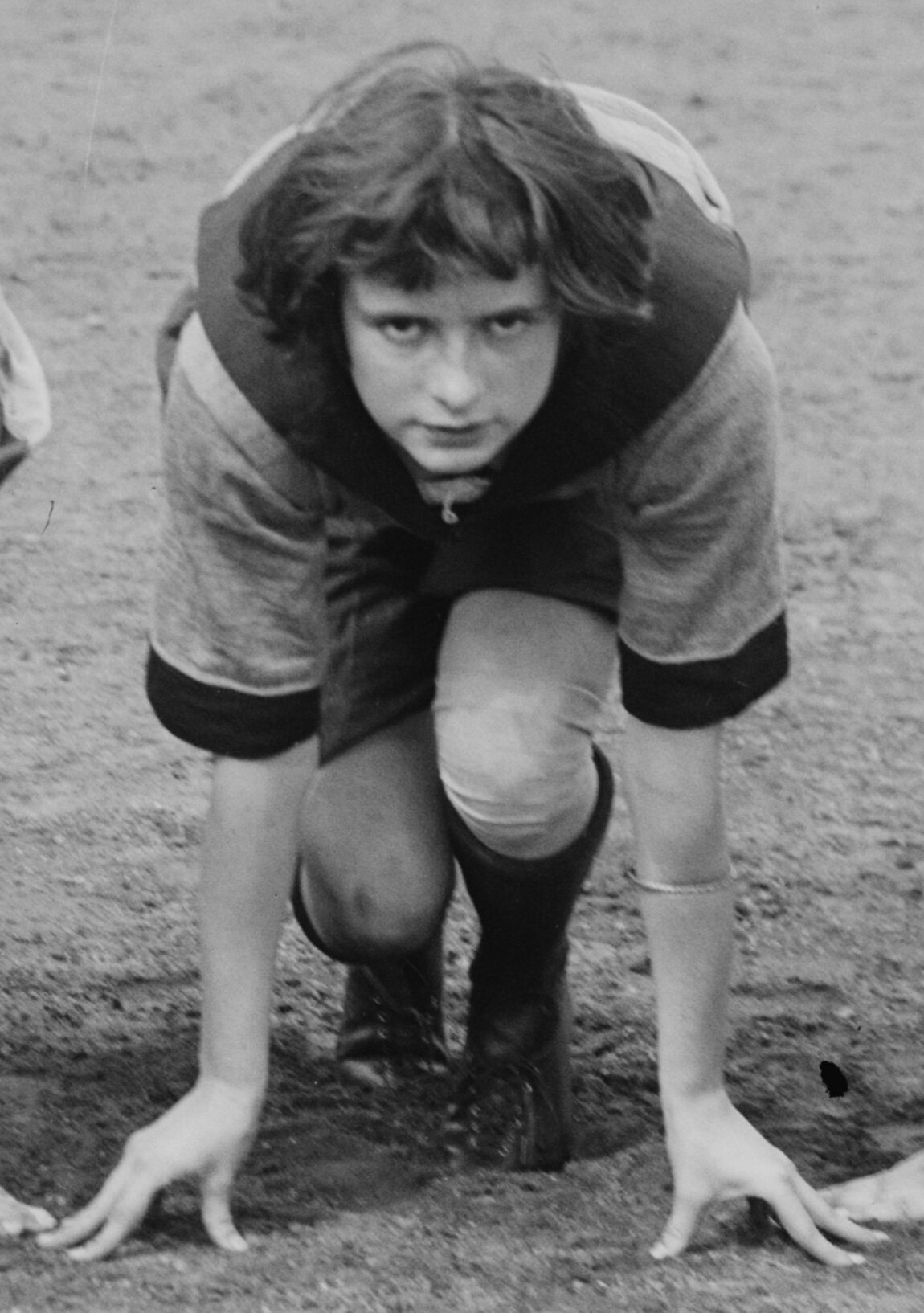
- Maybelle Gilliland in 1922
- Born: Mabel Gilliland; January 23, 1906; Sussex, New Brunswick, Canada
- Died: February 1, 1971 (age 65)
- Other names: Maybelle Cotterill

Maybelle Montgomery Gilliland (January 23, 1906 – February 1, 1971) was a Canadian-born American athlete in track events in the 1920s and early 1930s. She was one of the thirteen members of the United States team at the 1922 Women's World Games in Paris.

== Early life and education ==
Gilliland was born in Sussex, New Brunswick, Canada, and raised in Pennsylvania and New Jersey, the daughter of William John Gilliland and Elizabeth J. Miller Gilliland. Her father, an Episcopal minister, was born in England, and her mother was born in the United States. She attended Leonia High School in New Jersey.

== Career ==
Gilliland was a teenager when she set the American record for the 100-yard dash, and qualified in the trials held at Mamaroneck, New York, for the United States team for the 1922 Women's World Games, together with her high school teammate Elizabeth Stine. She also won the 50-yard dash, and ran on a record-breaking 440-yard relay team at Mamaroneck.

Gilliland continued running in competition for more than a decade after the 1922 games. In 1925, she competed in two races at the Women's National Championships in Pasadena, California, placing second in the 50-yard dash and fourth in the 100-yard run; she also placed second at a national event in San Francisco that year, in the 75-yard dash. In 1928, she placed second in the 50-yard dash at the Olympic trials. At the AAU women's outdoor nationals in 1929, held in Chicago, she tied the world record time for the 220-yard dash. She led the American women in the international girls' relay at the Millrose Games in 1930. In 1931, she was on the winning women's 440-yard relay team, and finished second in the women's 50-yard dash at the Metropolitan AAU indoor meet in New York City, where she also placed third in the basketball throw event. She was also described as a "hurdler" in 1931.

Gilliland retired from track sports in 1933, but continued competing in tennis tournaments past that year. She was active in a recreational bowling league in the 1950s.

== Personal life ==
Gilliland married Clarence E. Cotterill. They had two daughters, Elizabeth and Barbara, and lived in Bogota, New Jersey. Then a resident of Lakehurst, New Jersey, she died in 1971, at the age of 65, while visiting her sister in Dunedin, Florida.
