= Erna Low =

British/Austrian businesswoman

- Born: Lӧwe; 28 July 1909; Vienna, Austria
- Died: 12 February 2002 (aged 92); London, England
- Occupation: Businesswoman
- Known for: Ski Travel Industry Innovation

Erna Low (28 July 1909 – 12 February 2002) was a British/Austrian Jewish businesswoman who settled in England and is best known for her work in the ski travel industry.

Low has been cited as a pioneer in the development of the package holiday and was the founder of Erna Low Travel Services Ltd. She worked in the holiday industry for over sixty years. She retired in 1995.

== Early years ==
Low was born in Vienna in 1909 as the only daughter of Eduard Carl Lӧwe and his wife Emma. She remained in the city throughout her childhood and education.

She became the Austrian javelin champion before moving to England in 1931, with ten borrowed pounds in her pocket, to research a PhD thesis on Lord de Tabley, a Victorian poet and botanist. Low finished second in the javelin throw event at the 1932 WAAA Championships and third at the 1933 WAAA Championships.

During her studies, Low traced the grandchildren of de Tabley and was invited to stay at the family home in Knutsford, Cheshire.

While living in Bloomsbury, Low earned a basic living as a language tutor, but decided that she needed to earn more to finance trips back to Austria to visit her sick mother and fulfil her passion for skiing.

Low's business career in the travel industry began in 1932 when she placed an advertisement in the Morning Post. It read:

'Winter Sports – Austria, fortnight, £15 only, including rail and hotel, arranged by young Viennese Graduette for young people leaving Christmas.'

Low set up a permanent home in Britain and became a citizen in 1940, changing her name from Lӧwe to Low in the process.

== War Years ==
The outbreak of World War II made ski trips to Austria impossible, so Low planned alternative visits to Switzerland.

For much of the war she worked for the BBC in Worcestershire where she would monitor German broadcasts for the Intelligence Service, but she disliked this role and chose to become a lecturer in the Army Education Corps.

She then developed the 'house-party' concept. Low recognised that families were separated by war service and offered the opportunity for people to meet one another at Christmas. She leased boarding schools and invited paying guests to stay. This venture became a company in 1946 and was later known as Enjoy Britain Ltd.

== 1947 – 1979: Erna Low Travel Service ==
In 1947, Low set up Erna Low Travel Service Ltd out of Reece Mews, South Kensington.

She worked with schools to run school courses and utilised the post-war demand for foreign travel to develop holidays for which the majority was paid before departure. A foreign exchange allowance of £50 meant that travel experts were in demand and Low's company provided this.

Low was very adept at finding new resorts for her clients in both the summer and winter market. Erna Low's 1948 brochure said: “Winter sports are on the map again” and by 1950, it included 24 continental trips. Low placed emphasis on the personal touch and until the mid-1950s, she accompanied each group on their trip.

An all-inclusive fortnight in a first-class hotel with Erna Low cost 38 guineas and after the introduction of charter flights in 1954, she even reduced costs by advising her clients to travel in ski clothes to save on excess baggage expenses.

Weekend train trips to Austria became a regular feature in this period of the company's development and customers were provided with a music carriage for entertainment during their 24-hour rail journey on the 'snow train'.

Low's business continued to grow and in 1972, with a staff of sixty and a turnover of £1.5 million, she opted to sell. She bought her name back in 1975 with the business struggling, but sold again in 1979 to become a consultant to the travel industry.

== Late career ==
Low reinvented her company in 1981 under the name Erna Low Consultants Ltd. In this role, Low concentrated on developing the health spa market throughout Europe. She became the official representative in the UK of resorts at La Plagne, Les Arcs and Flaine, while she was decorated for her services to tourism by France, Italy and Austria.

Low continued to work in the 1990s and gained membership of the Chartered Institute of Marketing for her feasibility study on Strathpeffer. She was also the vice-president of both the Kensington Chamber of Commerce and Women of the Year Association, and won a 'Women Mean Business' award at the age of 83.

Low handed control of the company to her successor and loyal employee, Joanna Yellowlees-Bound, in 1995.

In May 2000, the company was entered into the British Travel Industry's 'Hall of Fame'.

== Personal life ==
Low was renowned for her formidable style, and she was never known to avoid confrontation. On one occasion, a senior executive with a rival company won an award at a trade ceremony. Clearly bitter at a setback earlier in his career, he said: “You once refused to employ me, and look where I am now.” Low's response provided an insight into the way in which she worked. “I still wouldn't employ you,” she said.

Low was a consummate networker and taught royalty, actors and politicians to ski.

Despite her often intimidating façade, Low made many friends through business and while travelling. She was the godmother to a number of children, including the actress Emily Lloyd, following a friendship with her grandmother, Uli Lloyd-Pack who worked for Low for over 30 years, and Uli Lloyd-Pack’s son, Roger Lloyd-Pack.

Low never married and chose to live alone in South Kensington with her dog.

== Death ==
Low died at the age of 92 on 12 February 2002 at her home in London.

== The Future of Erna Low Ltd ==
The company continues to operate in the ski industry with Low's principles forming an integral part of Erna Low's identity.

Erna Low Ltd marked the 80th-year anniversary of Low's Morning Post advertisement in 2012 and Mark Frary's biography, Aiming High, was launched at the Coronet Cinema in London on 11 October 2012.

In addition to this, Erna Low Ltd produced a short film of Low’s life from many thousands of hours of archive cine films.

In 2019, Erna Low Ltd was acquired by wintersports specialist NUCO Travel. “Just as Erna favoured me to take over her life’s work, I am now delighted to pass on the mantle to the next generation, and who better than an innovative and thriving ski company such as NUCO Travel, which I have known since its inception and where I am a minority shareholder. With Erna Low managing director Jane Bolton ensuring our values remain a priority, I know the company will continue to blossom as part of the NUCO family.” explains Joanna Yellowlees-Bound who retired as chief executive of Erna Low, after 37 years at the helm.
