= Ruth Christmas =

British middle-distance runner

Personal information
- Nationality: British (English)
- Born: 12 November 1904 Cambridge, Cambridgeshire, England
- Died: 2 April 2001 (aged 96) Chelmsford, Essex, England

Sport
- Sport: Athletics
- Event: middle-distance
- Club: London Olympiades AC

Ruth Lillian Christmas (12 November 1904 – 2 April 2001) was a British middle-distance runner.

== Biography ==
Christmas and her sister Esther followed their father into athletics. Ruth began competing in Cambridge in the 1920s, then moved to London and joined the London Olympiades women's athletics club. She took second place behind Violet Streater in the half-mile at the 1929 WAAA Championships, and began competing internationally, recording impressive results.

Christmas finished second behind Gladys Lunn in the half-mile event at the 1930 WAAA Championships. At the AAA Cross Country Championships, held over a three mile distance, Christmas finished runner-up in Wolverton in 1930, and third at Epsom Downs in February 1931. Her result in 1931 contributed to a team victory for her club London Olympiades. Christmas was again runner-up in 1932 at Coventry. She gained plaudits for finishing second despite running with a heavily strapped knee, having aggravated an injury in the Southern Championships. She once again finished second behind Gladys Lunn in the 880 yards event at the 1931 WAAA Championships.

In the mile, Christmas recorded a possible world record time of 5:27.5 in 1932.

The 1933 cross country season saw the exact same top three in both the Southern Counties Championship and the National Championship. In each race Christmas finished runner-up to Lillian Styles, with her sister Esther in third. Christmas finished six seconds behind Styles in the nationals, held in waterlogged conditions at Warwick Racecourse.

In her favoured distance of 880-yards or 800-metres, Christmas had a longstanding rivalry with Gladys Lunn, who stopped Christmas from winning several WAAA title. She finally became national 800 metres champion at the 1933 WAAA Championships. She gained French nationality through marriage, becoming Ruth Christmas-Paysant, and began competing for her adopted homeland, winning the 1935 French Championships 800-metre title, and the cross-country equivalent in 1936. In 1939, she and her husband returned to Britain to avoid the oncoming World War II, and she retired from athletics. Author and playwright Simon Raven is her nephew.
