= Joan Cunningham =

British athlete

Personal information
- Nationality: British (Scottish)

Sport
- Sport: Athletics
- Club: Edinburgh University
Medal record
Women's Athletics
Representing Scotland
British Empire Games
Bronze medal – third place	1934 London	660y relay

Joan K. Cunningham was a Scottish athlete who competed and won a bronze medal at the 1934 British Empire Games (now Commonwealth Games).

== Biography ==
Cunningham competed in the 100 yards and 660 yards relay event at the 1934 British Empire Games in London, England. She won a bronze medal as part of the Scottish Empire Games team in the relay.

She was a member of the Edinburgh University club and won the 100 yards title at the 1934 Scottish Athletics Championships.
