= Elsie Maguire =

British athlete

Personal information
- Nationality: British (English)
- Born: 7 August 1908 Kensington, London
- Died: 16 August 1989 (aged 81) Brent, London, England

Sport
- Sport: Athletics
- Event: Sprints
- Club: London Olympiades AC
Medal record
Women's Athletics
Representing England
British Empire Games
Gold medal – first place	1934 London	3×110/220 yd

Elsie Evelin Shaw (née Maguire, 7 August 1908 – 16 August 1989) was an English athlete who competed in the 1934 British Empire Games.

== Biography ==
Maguire was born in August 1908 in Kensington, London. She married William Frederick Shaw in June 1935 in Hackney, London.

Maguire finished second behind Eileen Hiscock in the 100 metres event at the 1934 WAAA Championships.

At the 1934 Empire Games she was a member of the England relay team which won the gold medal in the 110-220-110 yards event. In the 100 yards competition she finished fourth.

Shaw died in Brent, London in 1989 at the age of 81.
