= Phyllis Bartholomew =

English long jumper (1914–2002)

Personal information
- Nationality: British (English)
- Born: 19 April 1914 Reading, Berkshire, England
- Died: January 2002 (aged 87) Portugal

Sport
- Sport: Athletics
- Event: long jump
- Club: Reading AC
Medal record
Women's athletics
Representing England
British Empire Games
Gold medal – first place	1934 London	Long jump

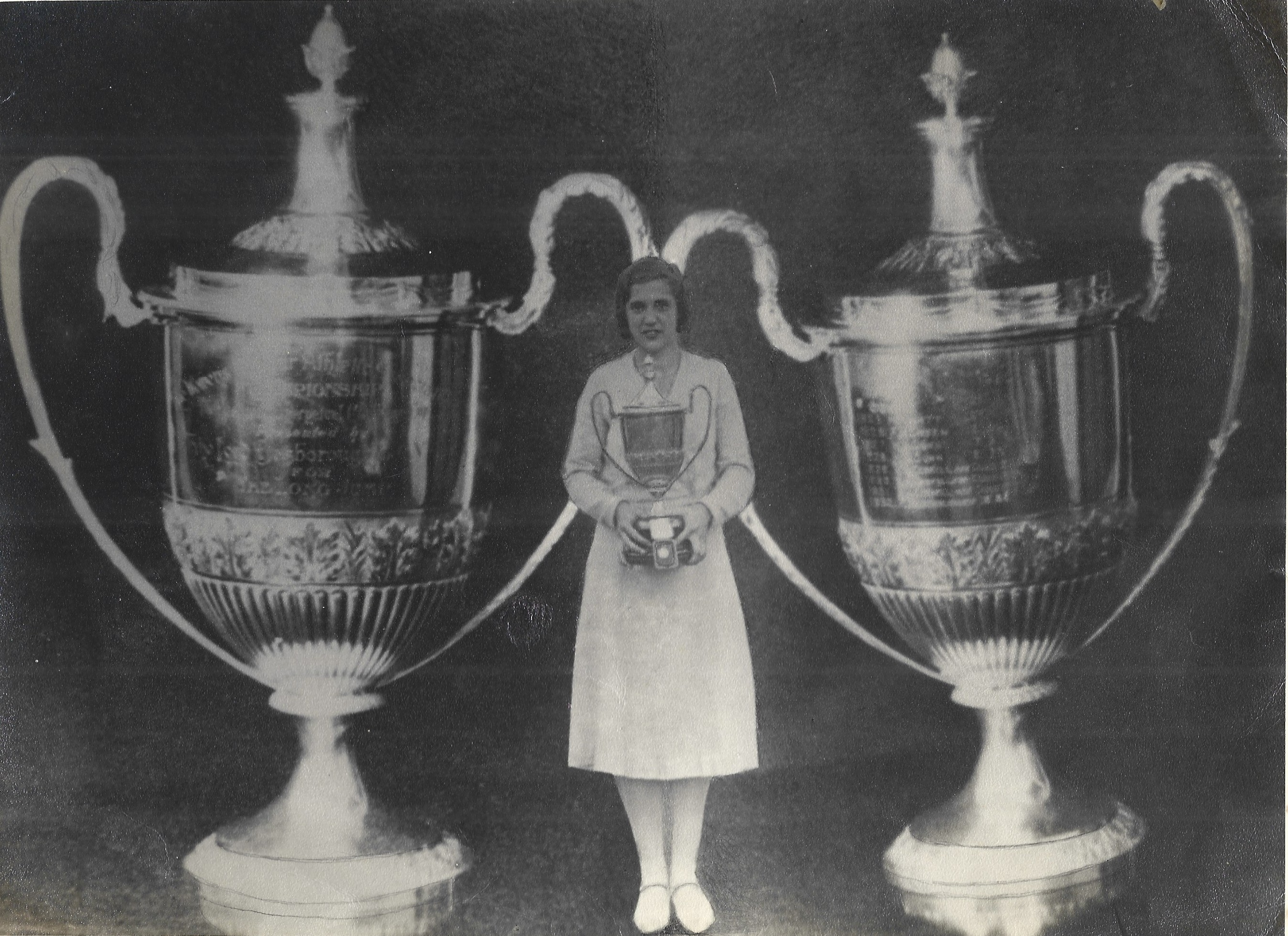

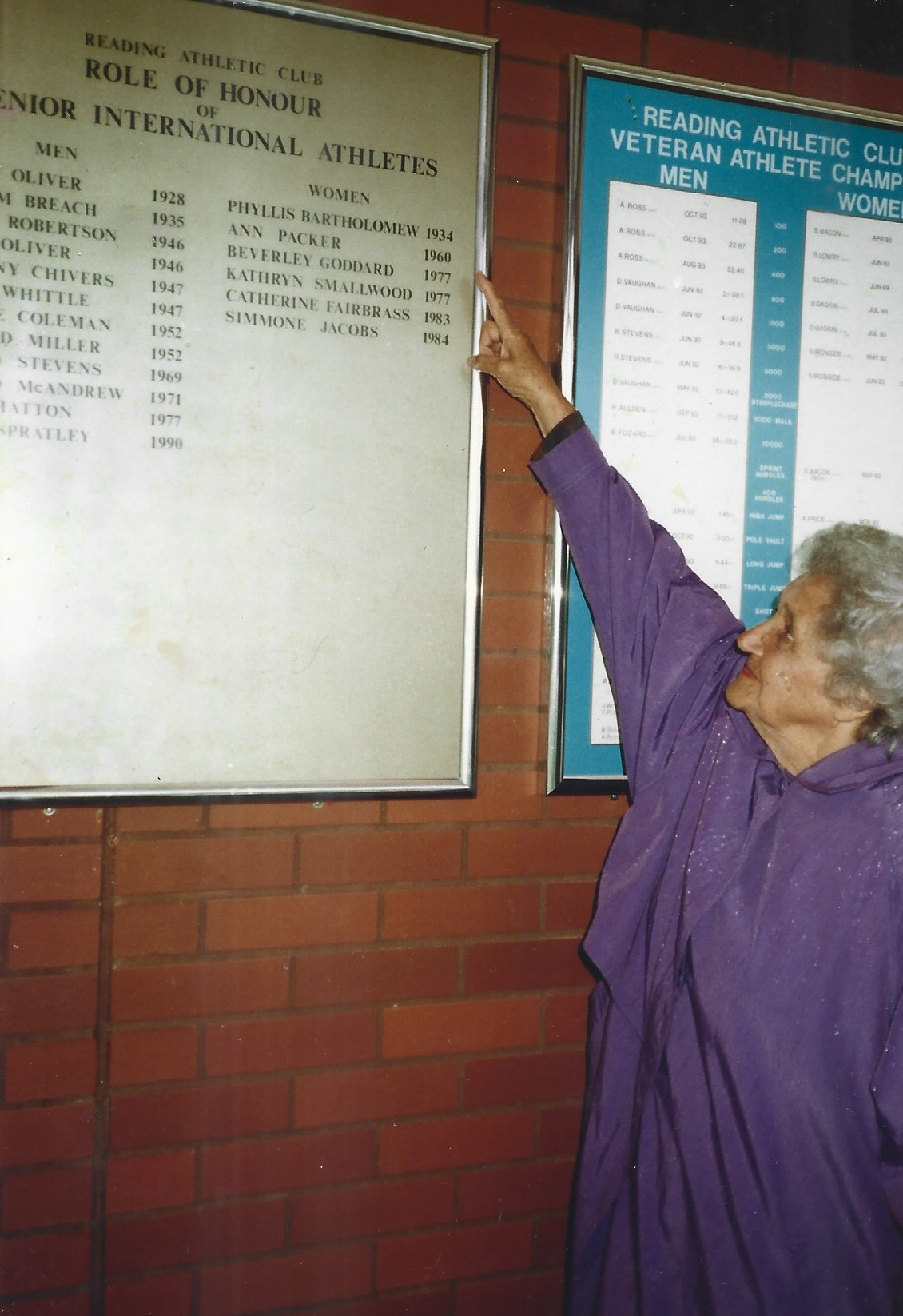

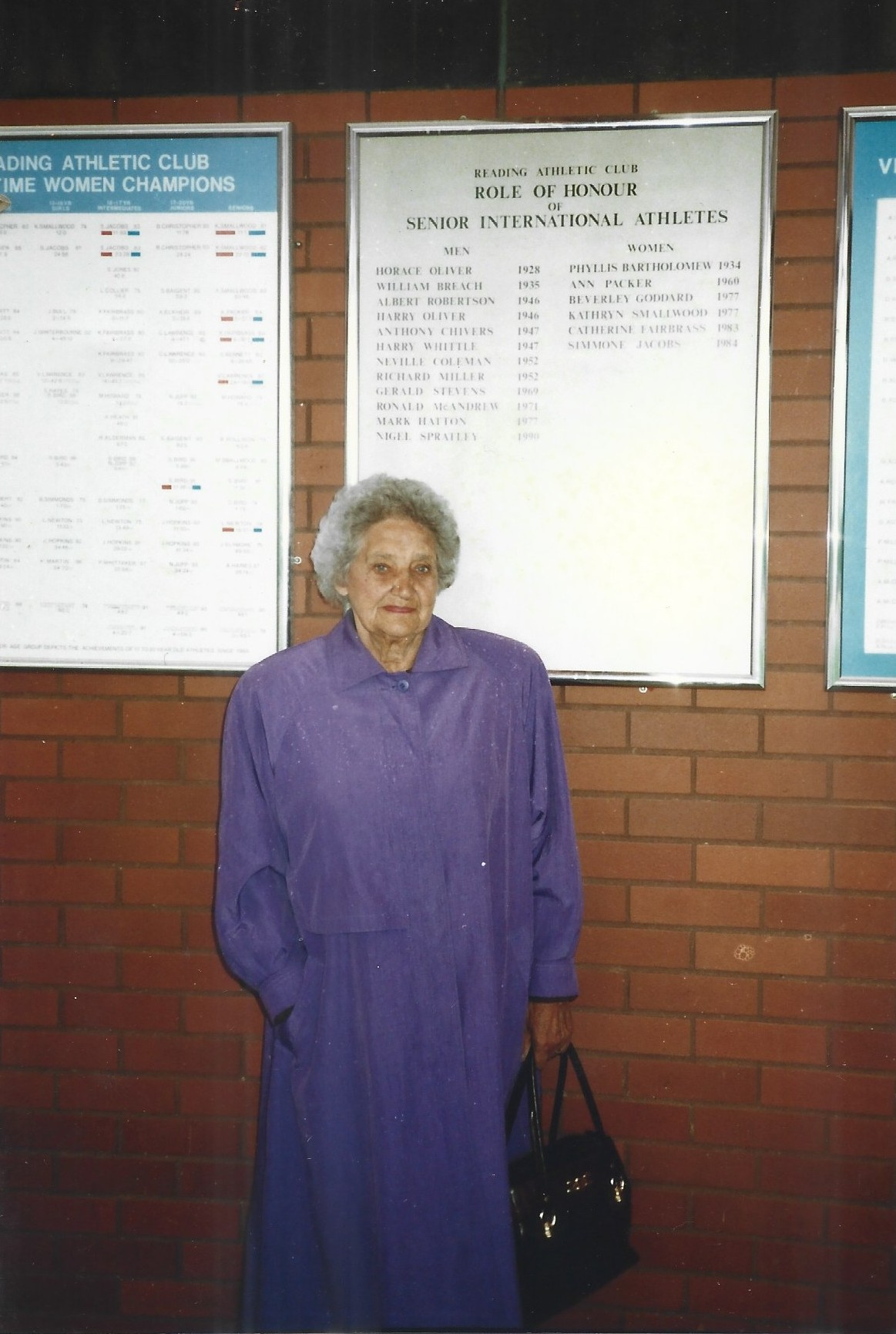

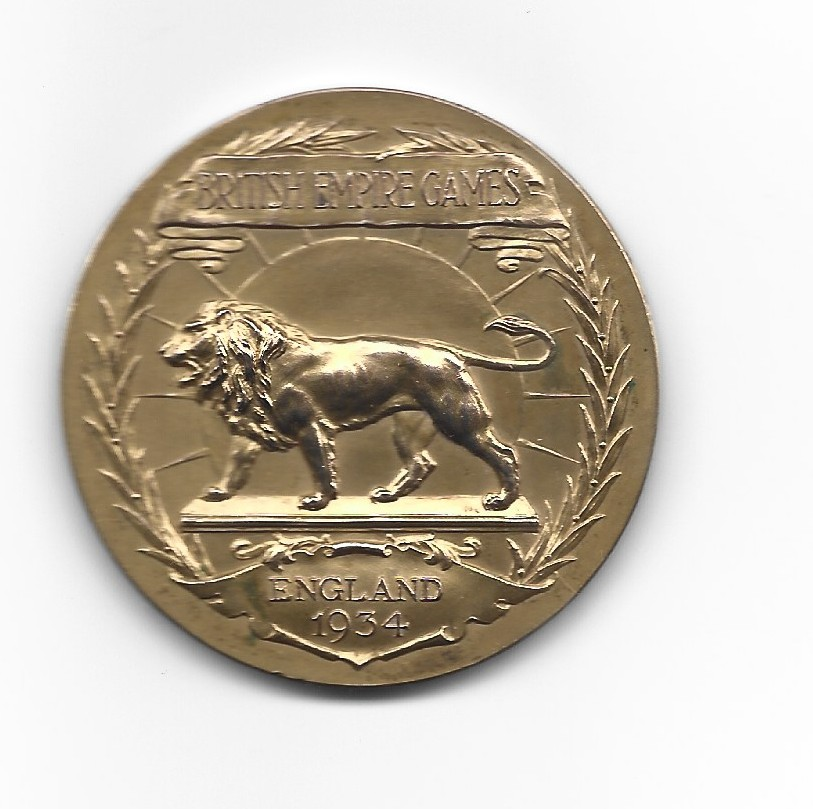

Phyllis Bartholomew (19 April 1914 – 26 January 2002) was an English track and field athlete who competed in the long jump event during her career.

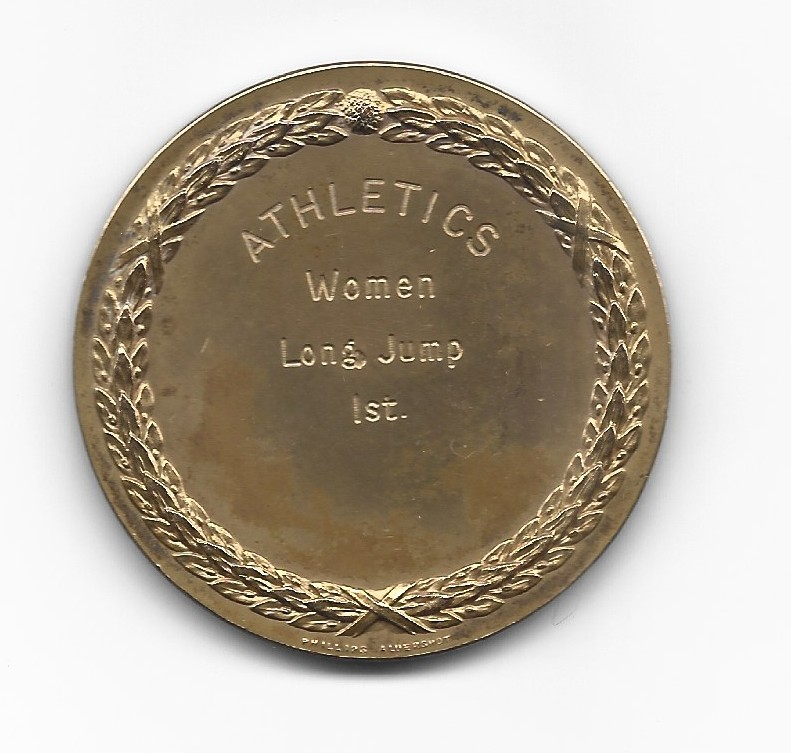

== Biography ==
Bartholomew born in Reading, Berkshire, finished second behind Muriel Cornell in the long jump event at the 1930 WAAA Championships. Two years later, she became the national long jump champion after winning the WAAA Championships title at the 1932 WAAA Championships and subsequently retained the title at the 1933 WAAA Championships and the 1934 WAAA Championships.

She won the gold medal in the long jump at the 1934 British Empire Games, and set her personal best (5.69 metres) on 9 July 1932 at a meet in London. She married Manuel Braz in Reading in 1937. The couple later moved to Portugal, where Braz died in 1975 and Bartholomew died in January 2002 at the age of 87.
