= Edwin Halstead =

English athlete

Personal information
- Nationality: British (English)
- Born: Edith Halstead; 7 September 1907 Radcliffe, England
- Died: 1962 (aged 54) Blackpool, England

Sport
- Sport: Athletics
- Event: javelin
- Club: Bury AC
Medal record
Athletics
Representing England
British Empire Games
Silver medal – second place	1934 London	Javelin

Edwin "Eddie" Halstead (7 September 1907 – 1962), formerly Edith Halstead, was an English athlete who competed at the 1934 British Empire Games.

== Biography ==
Halstead became the national javelin champion after winning the British WAAA Championships title at the 1932 WAAA Championships.

Halstread regained the WAAA javelin title at the 1934 WAAA Championships and shortly afterwards at the 1934 British Empire Games in London, Halstead won a silver medal in the women's javelin throw competition.

Halstead's sister Nellie competed at the 1932 Summer Olympics and the 1934 Empire Games.

Later, as part of a gender transition, Halstead changed his name to Edwin.
