= Camille Sabie =

American track and field athlete

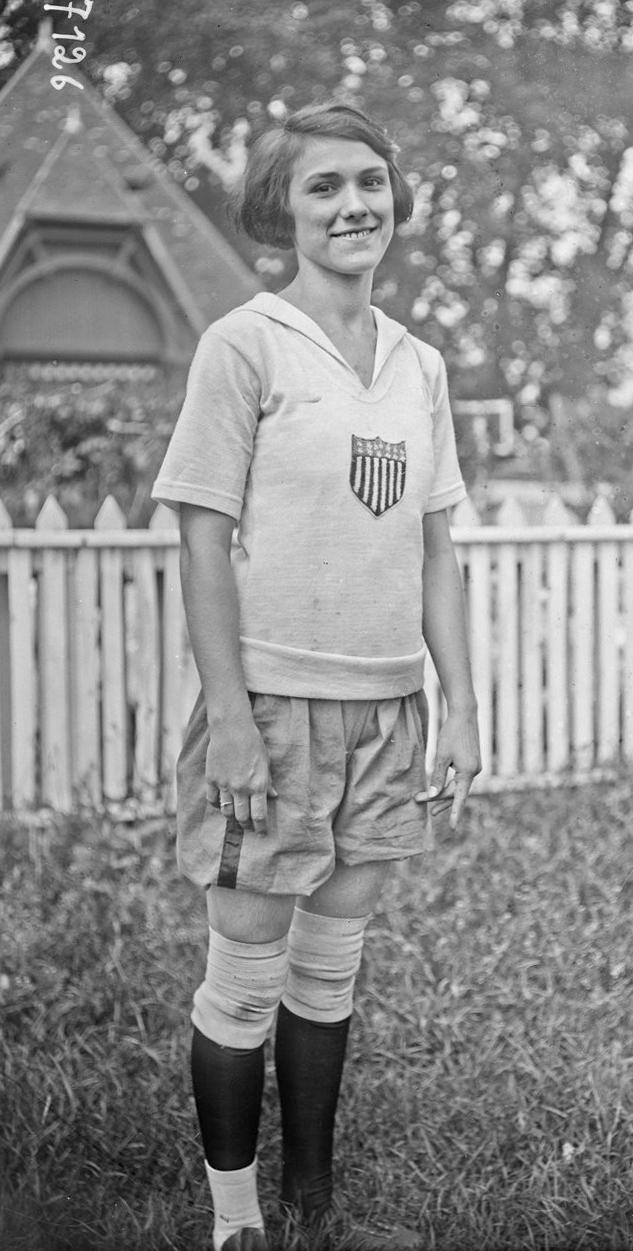
- Sabie at the 1922 Women's World Games

Personal information
- Born: November 25, 1902 Newark, New Jersey, United States
- Died: March 20, 1998 (aged 95) Millburn, New Jersey, United States
- Education: Newark Normal School

Sport
- Sport: Athletics
- Events: Long jump, hurdles
- Coached by: Joseph D'Angola

Achievements and titles
- Personal bests: LJ – 4.96 m (1922); 100 ydH – 14.4 (1922)
Medal record
Representing the United States
Women's World Games
| Gold medal – first place | 1922 Paris | 110 yd hurdles |
| Gold medal – first place | 1922 Paris | Standing long jump |
| Bronze medal – third place | 1922 Paris | Long jump |

Camille Sabie (November 25, 1902 – March 20, 1998) was an American athlete who represented the United States in several events at the 1922 Women's World Games, and won gold medals in the 110-yard hurdles and standing long jump and a bronze medal in the conventional long jump.

== Early life ==
Sabie was born November 25, 1902, in Newark, New Jersey, to James and Angelina Sabie. She graduated from East Side High School, where she was encouraged to be a track star by her parents. Sabie enrolled in Newark Normal School (since renamed as Kean University) and showed was a star in track, especially hurdles.

== 1922 Women's World Games ==
Tryouts were held May 13, 1922, at Oaksmere School in Mamaroneck, New York. At tryouts, Sabie broke the world record for the 100 yard hurdle and came in second in the 50-yard dash. The Games were held on August 20, 1922, and the team placed second. Sabie established another world record in the 100-yard hurdles and also won the standing broad jump. She came in third in the running broad jump. Sabie received a hero's welcome when coming home to Newark, greeted by a crowd of over one thousand.

== Later life ==
After a few more competitions the same year, Sabie taught at Ann Street School. She earned a degree in elementary education from Newark Normal School and then moved to Hawkins Street School where she met her husband George Malbrock, who was later principal of Madison Avenue School. She married George Malbrock in 1930. Their daughter, Jane Malbrock, was born in 1946 and was a professor of mathematics at Kean University.

Camille Malbrock is listed from at least 1942 through 1963 in yearbooks as a physical education teacher at East Side High School, and taught for 35 years

A longtime resident of Millburn, New Jersey, Sabie died March 20, 1998.
