= Ivy Walker =

English athlete (1911–??)

Personal information
- Nationality: British (English)
- Born: 22 September 1911 England

Sport
- Sport: Athletics
- Event: Sprinting
- Club: Cambridge Harriers/Metrogas ASA
Medal record
Representing Great Britain
Women's Athletics
Women's World Games
Silver medal – second place	1930 Prague	4×100 metre relay
Representing England
British Empire Games
Silver medal – second place	1934 London	4×110/220 yd

Ivy Kay Walker, later Thorpe (born 22 September 1911, date of death unknown), was an English athlete who competed in the 1930 Women's World Games and the 1934 British Empire Games.

== Biography ==
Walker finished second behind Kinue Hitomi in the 220 yards event at the 1928 WAAA Championships. The following year, Walker became the national 100 yards champion after winning the British WAAA Championships title at the 1929 WAAA Championships

At the 1930 Women's World Games in Prague she was a member, along with Ethel Scott, Eileen Hiscock and Daisy Ridgley, of the British 4×100 metre relay team which won the silver medal.

Walker finished second behind Nellie Halstead in both the 100 and 220 yards events at the 1931 WAAA Championships.

At the 1934 Empire Games she was a member of the English relay team which won the silver medal in the 220-110-220-110 yards relay competition (with Eileen Hiscock, Nellie Halstead and Ethel Johnson). In the 220 yards competition she was eliminated in the heats.

Walker continued to compete and finished second behind Audrey Wade and Eileen Hiscock in the 60 metres and 100 metres events respectively at the 1935 WAAA Championships.
