= Sheena Dobbie =

British athlete

Personal information
- Nationality: British (Scottish)

Sport
- Sport: Athletics
- Club: Glasgow University
Medal record
Women's Athletics
Representing Scotland
British Empire Games
Bronze medal – third place	1934 London	660y relay

Sheena M. Dobbie was a Scottish athlete who competed and won a bronze medal at the 1934 British Empire Games (now Commonwealth Games).

== Biography ==
Dobbie attended Inverness Royal Academy and the University of Glasgow and was the daughter of a district locomotive superintendent at Polmadie, Glasgow.

Dobbie competed in the 220 yards and 660 yards relay event at the 1934 British Empire Games in London, England. She won a bronze medal as part of the Scottish Empire Games team in the relay.

She was a member of the Glasgow University club and won the 220 yards title in a record time at the 1934 Scottish Athletics Championships. In 1935, she lowered her own 220 yards Scottish record, recording 26.1/5sec.
