= Elsie Green =

English hurdler

Personal information
- Nationality: British (English)
- Born: 27 January 1908 Edmonton, Middlesex, England
- Died: October 2002 (aged 94) Gipping, Suffolk, England

Sport
- Sport: Athletics
- Event: Hurdles
- Club: North London Harriers
Medal record
Women's Athletics
Representing England
British Empire Games
Bronze medal – third place	1934 London	80 m hurdles

Elsie Eleanor Green married name Plimmer (27 January 1908 – October 2002) was an English athlete who competed in the 1934 British Empire Games.

== Biography ==
Green became the national 80 metres hurdles champion after winning the British WAAA Championships title at the 1931 WAAA Championships and setting a world record in a time of 12.0 sec. Green successfully defended her title the following two years at the 1932 WAAA Championships and the 1933 WAAA Championships.

Green represented England at the 1934 Empire Games, where she won the bronze medal in the 80 metre hurdles event. Green won her fourth and fifth WAAA hurdles titles at the 1934 WAAA Championships and the 1935 WAAA Championships respectively.

In 1935, she married another athlete Thomas F. Plimmer.
