= Mary Milne (athlete) =

British athlete

Personal information
- Nationality: British (English)
- Born: 23 July 1914 London, England
- Died: 23 June 2014 (aged 99) Streatham, London, England

Sport
- Sport: Athletics
- Event: high jump
- Club: Mitcham AC

Mary Milne (1914-2014) married name Dumbrill, was a female athlete who competed for England.

== Biography ==
Milne became the national high jump champion after winning the British WAAA Championships title at the 1932 WAAA Championships. The following year she retained her WAAA title at the 1933 WAAA Championships.

She competed for England in the high jump at the 1934 British Empire Games in London.

Milne won her third WAAA title at the 1935 WAAA Championships and was the highest British athlete on a further two occasions (in 1930 and 1934, the winners of those two championships being Carolina Gisolf of the Netherlands and Gretel Bergmann of Germany respectively.

== Personal life ==
Mary Milne married Leonard Dumbrill in 1935.
