= Ethel Johnson (athlete) =

English athlete (1908–1964)

Personal information
- Nationality: British (English)
- Born: 8 October 1908 Westhoughton, England
- Died: 30 March 1964 (aged 55) England
- Height: 157 cm (5 ft 2 in)
- Weight: 51 kg (112 lb)

Sport
- Sport: Athletics
- Event: Sprints
- Club: Bolton Harriers
Medal record
Representing Great Britain
Women's Athletics
Women's World Games
Bronze medal – third place	1934 London	60 metres
Representing England
British Empire Games
Silver medal – second place	1934 London	4×110/220 yd

Ethel Johnson (8 October 1908 – 30 March 1964) was an English athlete who competed for Great Britain at the 1932 Summer Olympics.

== Biography ==
She was born in Westhoughton, Lancashire and was a member of Bolton United Harriers.

Johnson became the national 100 yards champion after winning the British WAAA Championships title at the 1932 WAAA Championships, setting a new world record in the heats of the event in a time of 11.0 seconds.

Shortly afterwards, she was one of a team of five women entered by the Women's Amateur Athletic Association at the 1932 Los Angeles Summer Olympics as Britain's first female Olympians in athletics events, together with Gwendoline Porter, Eileen Hiscock, Nellie Halstead, and seventeen-year-old Violet Webb. They sailed for five days from Southampton to Quebec and then travelled a further 3000 miles by train before arriving in Los Angeles. Ethel was eliminated in the first round of the Olympic 100 metre contest. and had to be replaced due to injury by Violet Webb in the women's 4×100 metres relay.

At the 1934 Empire Games she was a member of the England relay team which won the silver medal in the 220-110-220-110 yards relay competition (with Eileen Hiscock, Nellie Halstead, Johnson and Ivy Walker). In the 100 yards competition she finished fifth and in the 220 yards contest she finished sixth.
