= Cathie Jackson =

British athlete

Personal information
- Nationality: British (Scottish)

Sport
- Sport: Athletics
- Club: Shettleston, Glasgow
Medal record
Women's Athletics
Representing Scotland
British Empire Games
Bronze medal – third place	1934 London	660y relay

Cathie F. Jackson was a Scottish athlete who competed and won a bronze medal at the 1934 British Empire Games (now Commonwealth Games).

== Biography ==
Jackson competed in the 100 yards, 220 yards and 660 yards relay event at the 1934 British Empire Games in London, England. She won a bronze medal as part of the Scottish Empire Games team in the relay.

She was a member of the Shettleston club in Glasgow and was described as a sprint specialist.
