= Marjorie O'Kell =

British athlete

Personal information
- Nationality: British (English)
- Born: 1 April 1908
- Died: 3 October 2009 (aged 101)

Sport
- Sport: Athletics
- Event: High jump
- Club: Middlesex Ladies AC

Marjorie Francis O'Kell, later Harris (1 April 1908 – 3 October 2009) was an English international track and field athlete who competed at the 1934 Empire Games.

== Biography ==
O'Kell's main event was the high jump and her personal best was 1.57 metres (5 ft 1 3/4 in) in 1931.

She was a member of the Middlesex Ladies AC and was twice the British Athletics Champion in high jump after winning the title at both the 1929 WAAA Championships and 1931 WAAA Championships.

She represented England at the 1934 British Empire Games in London, where she competed in the high jump event.

She later became a life-president of the Women's Amateur Athletic Association (of Great Britain), dying in 2009 aged 101 years.
