= Nellie Halstead =

English track and field athlete (1910–1991)

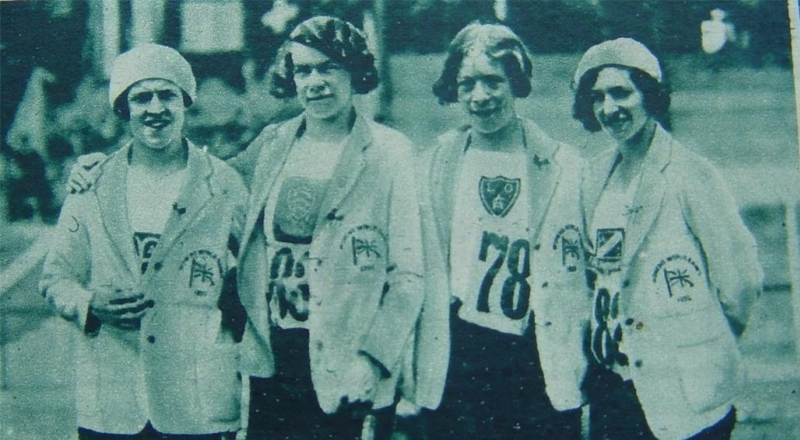
- Halstead (far right)

Personal information
- Nationality: British (English)
- Born: 19 September 1910 Radcliffe, Lancashire, England
- Died: 11 November 1991 (aged 81) Bury, England

Sport
- Sport: Athletics
- Event: Sprints/400m
- Club: Bury & Radcliffe AC
Medal record
Representing Great Britain
Women's Athletics
Women's World Games
Bronze medal – third place	1930 Prague	200 metres
Olympic Games
Bronze medal – third place	1932 Los Angeles	4x100 metre relay
Representing England
British Empire Games
Gold medal – first place	1934 London	3×110/220 yd
Silver medal – second place	1934 London	4×110/220 yd
Bronze medal – third place	1934 London	220 yd

Eleanor Halstead (19 September 1910 – 11 November 1991) was an English track and field athlete who competed for Great Britain in the 1932 Summer Olympics in Los Angeles. There is a running track named after her in Radcliffe.

== Biography ==
Halstead was born in Radcliffe, Lancashire and died in Bury. She was a member of Bury Athletic Club and Radcliffe Athletic Club.

Halstead became national 220 yards champion after winning the British WAAA Championships title at the 1930 WAAA Championships in a world record time of 25.2 sec. The following year, Halstead won three WAAA titles, retaining her 220 yards crown and also becoming national 100 yards champion and national 440 yards champion at the 1931 WAAA Championships.

She won gold medals in the 60 metres and 200 metres at the Olympics of Grace in 1931. Halstead continued her success by retaining her 200 and 440 yards titles at the 1932 WAAA Championships and winning the 400 metres title at the 1933 WAAA Championships.

She competed for Great Britain as one of Britain's first women track Olympians in the 1932 Summer Olympics held in Los Angeles, where in the 4×100 metres she won the bronze medal with her team mates Eileen Hiscock, Gwendoline Porter and Violet Webb (replacing the injured Ethel Johnson).

At the 1934 Empire Games she was a member of the England relay team which won the gold medal in the 110-220-110 yards relay event and the silver medal in the 220-110-220-110 yards relay competition (with Eileen Hiscock, Halstead, Ethel Johnson and Ivy Walker). In the 220 yards she won the bronze medal.

Halstead won further WAAA titles in the 800 metres at the 1935 WAAA Championships in a national record time of 2:15.6 and at the 1938 WAAA Championships and a 400 metres title at the 1937 WAAA Championships.

According to historian Jean Williams, Halstead also played as a centre forward for the Dick, Kerr's Ladies football team.

She also competed in the 1.9-mile women's race before the International Cross Country Championships, winning the title for England.

== Personal life ==
At the 1934 Games, her sibling Edwin Halstead (then Edith Halstead) also won a silver medal.
