= Eileen Hiscock =

English track and field athlete (1909–1958)

Personal information
- Nationality: British (English)
- Born: 25 August 1909 Blackheath, England
- Died: 3 September 1958 (aged 49) Hackney, England
- Height: 167 cm (5 ft 6 in)
- Weight: 63 kg (139 lb)

Sport
- Sport: Athletics
- Event: Sprinting
- Club: London Olympiades AC
Medal record
Representing Great Britain
Silver medal – second place	1936 Berlin	4×100 metre relay
Bronze medal – third place	1932 Los Angeles	4×100 metre relay
Women's World Games
Silver medal – second place	1930 Prague	4×100 metre relay
Bronze medal – third place	1934 London	100 m
Bronze medal – third place	1934 London	200 m
Representing England
British Empire Games
Gold medal – first place	1934 London	100 yd
Gold medal – first place	1934 London	220 yd
Gold medal – first place	1934 London	3×110/220 yd
Silver medal – second place	1934 London	4×110/220 yd

Eileen May Hiscock, later Wilson, (25 August 1909 – 3 September 1958) was an English track and field athlete who competed for Great Britain in the 1932 Summer Olympics and in the 1936 Summer Olympics.

== Biography ==
Hiscock born in Blackheath, London, finished third behind Ivy Walker in the 100 yards event at the 1929 WAAA Championships. The following year, Hiscock became national 100 yards champion after winning the British WAAA Championships title at the 1930 WAAA Championships. At the 1930 Women's World Games in Prague she was a member, along with Ethel Scott, Ivy Walker and Daisy Ridgley, of the British 4×100 metre relay team which won the silver medal.

In 1932, she was one of five women entered by the Women's Amateur Athletic Association at the 1932 Los Angeles Summer Olympics as Britain's first female Olympians in athletics events, together with Ethel Johnson, Gwendoline Porter, Nellie Halstead, and seventeen-year-old Violet Webb. They sailed for five days from Southampton to Quebec and then travelled a further 3000 miles by train before arriving in Los Angeles. In the 4 x 100 metres women's relay she won the bronze medal with her teammates Gwendoline Porter, Violet Webb (replacing the injured Johnson) and Nellie Halstead. In the women's 100 metres she came 5th.

Hiscock regained both the 100 metres and 200 titles at the 1933 WAAA Championships and then won another 100 metres title at the 1934 WAAA Championships.

The following month, at the 1934 Empire Games, she won the gold medal in the 100 yards competition as well as in the 220 yards contest. She also was a member of the English relay team which won the gold medal in the 110-220-110 yards relay contest and the silver medal in the 220-110-220-110 yards relay competition (with Hiscock, Nellie Halstead, Ethel Johnson and Ivy Walker). In the 1934 World Women's Games, she won the bronze medals in the 100 metres and 200 metres contests.

In the 1936 Summer Olympics, she won the silver medal with her teammates Violet Olney, Audrey Brown and Barbara Burke in the 4×100 metre relay event. In the 100 metre event she was eliminated in the semi-finals.

She married John H Wilson in 1936.
