= Anthony Hooper =

Anthony or Antony Hooper may refer to:

- Sir Anthony Robin Maurice Hooper (1918–1987), of the Hooper baronets
- Tony Hooper (1943–2020), English singer-songwriter
- Anthony Hooper (judge) (born 1937), member of the British Privy Council
- Antony Hooper (cricketer) (born 1967), English cricketer

== See also ==
- Tony Hopper (1976–2018), English footballer
