= Horsenden Hill =

Hill in Ealing, London

Coordinates: 51.54738°N 0.32128°W

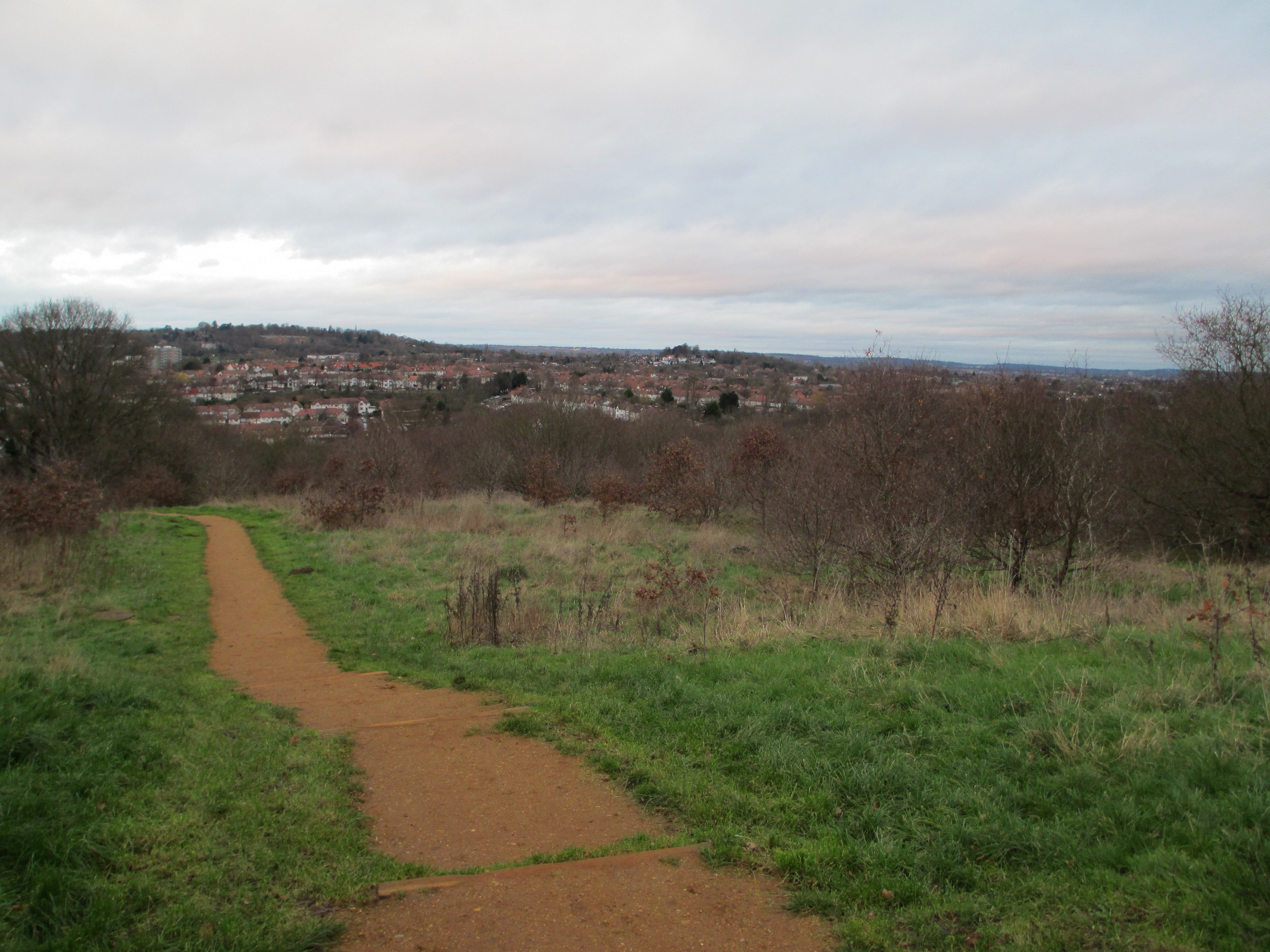
Horsenden Hill

Horsenden Hill's location in London

Horsenden Hill (/ˈhɔːrsəndən/; grid reference TQ 161 843) is a hill and open space, located between the Perivale, Sudbury, and Greenford areas of West London. It is in the London Borough of Ealing, close to the boundary with the London Borough of Brent, and with the southern edge of the London Borough of Harrow nearby. It is one of the higher eminences in the local area, rising to 85 m (276 ft) above sea level, and the summit forms part of the site of an ancient hillfort. It is the site of a trig point, TP4024.

== Geology and formation ==
The base of this isolated hill is at an altitude of approximately 50 metres. Like all of the immediately surrounding area, the base of the hill, as well as the slopes of the hill up to about 70m, are on London Clay. Between about 70m and 80m is an isolated layer of sandier Claygate Beds. Both deposits are of Eocene age, dated at about 50 million years ago.

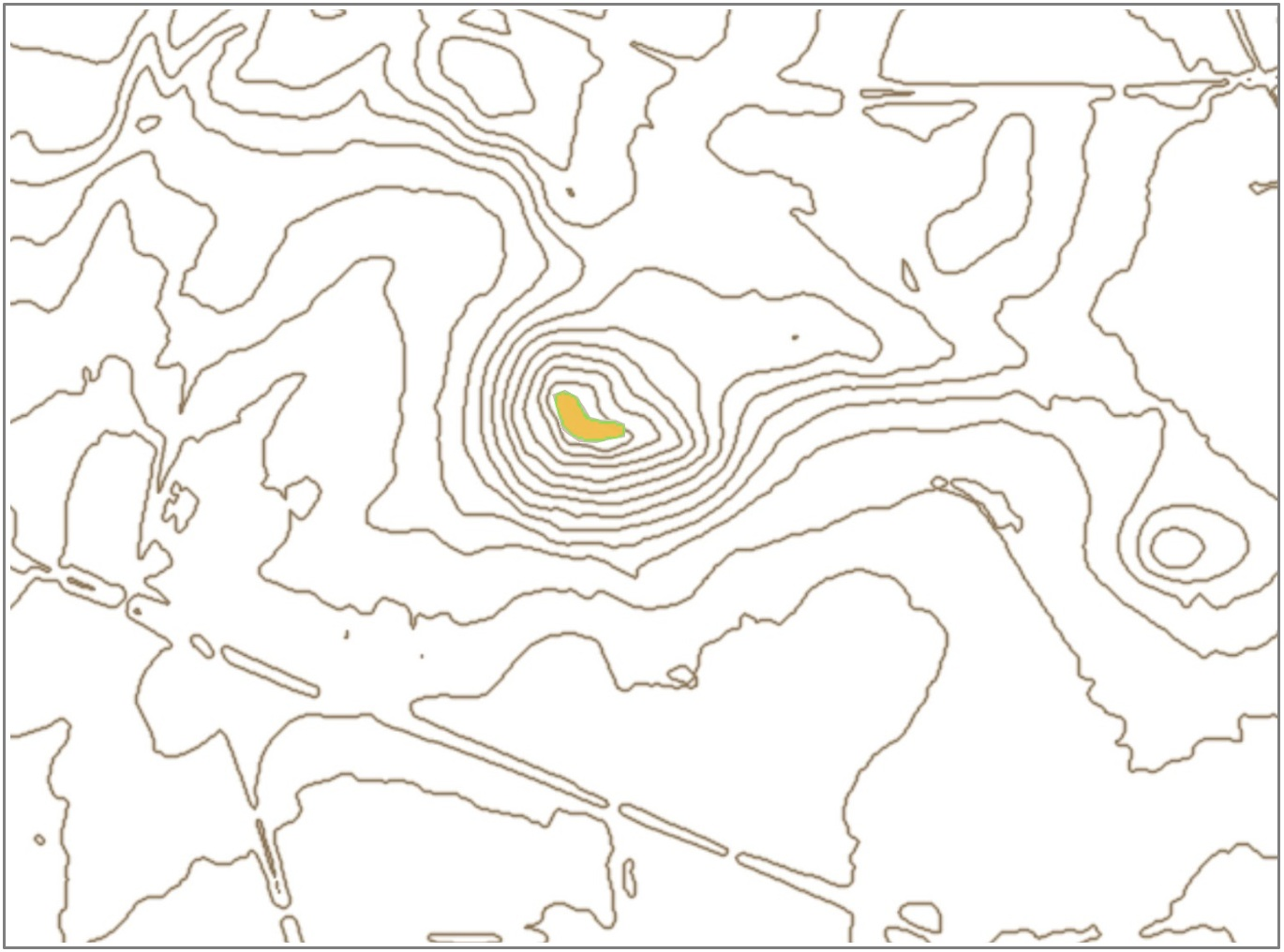
Contour map of Horsenden Hill (with contours at 5 metre intervals), showing both its singular isolated form, and, in orange, the summit outcrop of Dollis Hill Gravel

At the top of the hill, from about 80m to the summit at 85m, is a small and relatively thin layer of much younger Dollis Hill Gravel. This permeable gravel has to some extent protected the easily-eroded London Clay below from being removed. It is not uncommon to find hills in the London area which are capped by a protective layer of sand or gravel, with London Clay below. Another example is Barn Hill (Wembley), to the north-east. Barn Hill also has a cap of Dollis Hill Gravel. So too does Dollis Hill itself. Like Horsenden Hill, both are isolated hills rising above lower ground on London Clay.

The Dollis Hill Gravel was deposited more than half a million years ago by a river which flowed from well to the south and continued to the north-east, through the "Finchley depression" towards Hoddesdon in Hertfordshire. This is known because about 7% of the gravel, which is otherwise composed mostly of flint, consists of a hard stone called chert, which can only come from Lower Greensand beds found to the south in Surrey. The river was probably an ancestor of the River Wey in Surrey.

This gravel was probably a much more extensive deposit in this part of the London area than it is now.

The river which deposited the Dollis Hill Gravel at Horsenden Hill eventually flowed into the River Thames around Hoddesdon. At that time, the Thames was itself flowing on a course different from today's, roughly on a line through Burnham Beeches, the Vale of St Albans, Harlow, Chelmsford and Colchester.

Approximately 450,000 years ago, during the Anglian Stage, ice from northern Britain reached as far south as north London. A lobe of this ice advanced up the valley whose river had previously deposited the Dollis Hill Gravel.

As the ice moved up the valley (it eventually reached at least as far as Finchley), the water being brought from the south by the "proto-Wey" river was blocked. So a huge lake developed in front of the advancing ice sheet. Lacustrine deposits left by this lake have been identified in Finchley and Hendon.

Water in this lake rose towards the level of the watershed to the east, which seems to have run approximately south from Hampstead Heath.

To the north and west, the River Thames also became blocked by another lobe of the advancing ice sheet in the Vale of St Albans. Another lake developed there, with its water rising towards a watershed running along high ground from Bushey to Northwood, then south to Uxbridge. It is possible that, for a time, water from the blocked-up Thames spilled over that watershed through various gaps (such as the one south of Watford which is used today by the Euston-Watford railway line), into the "proto-Wey" lake.

Eventually, both watersheds were breached by the rising water. The Thames established a new course running east from Uxbridge. It cut off and was joined by the proto-Wey river at Richmond, and then it headed towards central London (roughly along the present course of the River Thames), and then towards the North Sea.

The lake in front of the Finchley ice lobe became drained. But prior to that, during the time that it rose and fell and swirled around, the lake must have caused a lot of erosion. In particular, it must have removed a lot of the Dollis Hill Gravel in this area. It left hills like Horsenden Hill and Barn Hill, which are capped by small remnants of the gravel, and whose isolated forms bears witness to the fluvial erosion which was carried out on all sides of each hill by the lake. These hills today are in the catchment area of the south-flowing River Brent.

So, if Horsenden Hill, and others like it, such as Barn Hill and Dollis Hill, today resemble islands in a lake which has since dried out, it is because that is a reasonable description of what they very probably are.

== History ==
It is known that 2500 years ago Iron Age people settled on what today is called Horsenden Hill as large amounts of pottery have been discovered. In fact, in 1978 the Iron Age settlement on Horsenden Hill was declared as an Ancient Scheduled monument by English Heritage.

It was probably during Saxon times that the hill acquired its name originally "Horsingdon", the last syllable don meaning hill fortress.

In the Second World War the hill was the site of an anti-aircraft battery, which was used to protect the local factories from air attack. There are currently two disused reservoirs built into the hill on the south side.

== Layout ==
To the south and east the hill is bound by the Grand Union Canal (Paddington branch), which runs roughly along the 100 ft (30 m) contour line.

To the south west lies Perivale Wood Local Nature Reserve, run and maintained by the Selborne Society. A scenic spot on the Capital Ring in the summer months, Horsenden Hill offers fine views across west London, northwest London and beyond; places visible include Harrow on the Hill, the new Wembley Stadium, Northala Fields, planes coming in to land at Heathrow Airport, and on a clear day, the Home Counties of Surrey, Berkshire and Buckinghamshire.

Two golf courses cover parts of the hill on the south and east sides. Nearby stations are Perivale tube, Sudbury Town tube and Greenford tube and rail stations. There is also a visitors centre located at Horsenden Farm on the east side of the hill and a public car park on the north side. The visitors centre closes at dusk. Access to both is via Horsenden Lane in North Greenford.

In the summer of 2006, as part of the Horsenden Grazing Project, Highland cattle were introduced to graze in a fenced-off area. Various other breeds of cow have subsequently been used.

== Gallery ==
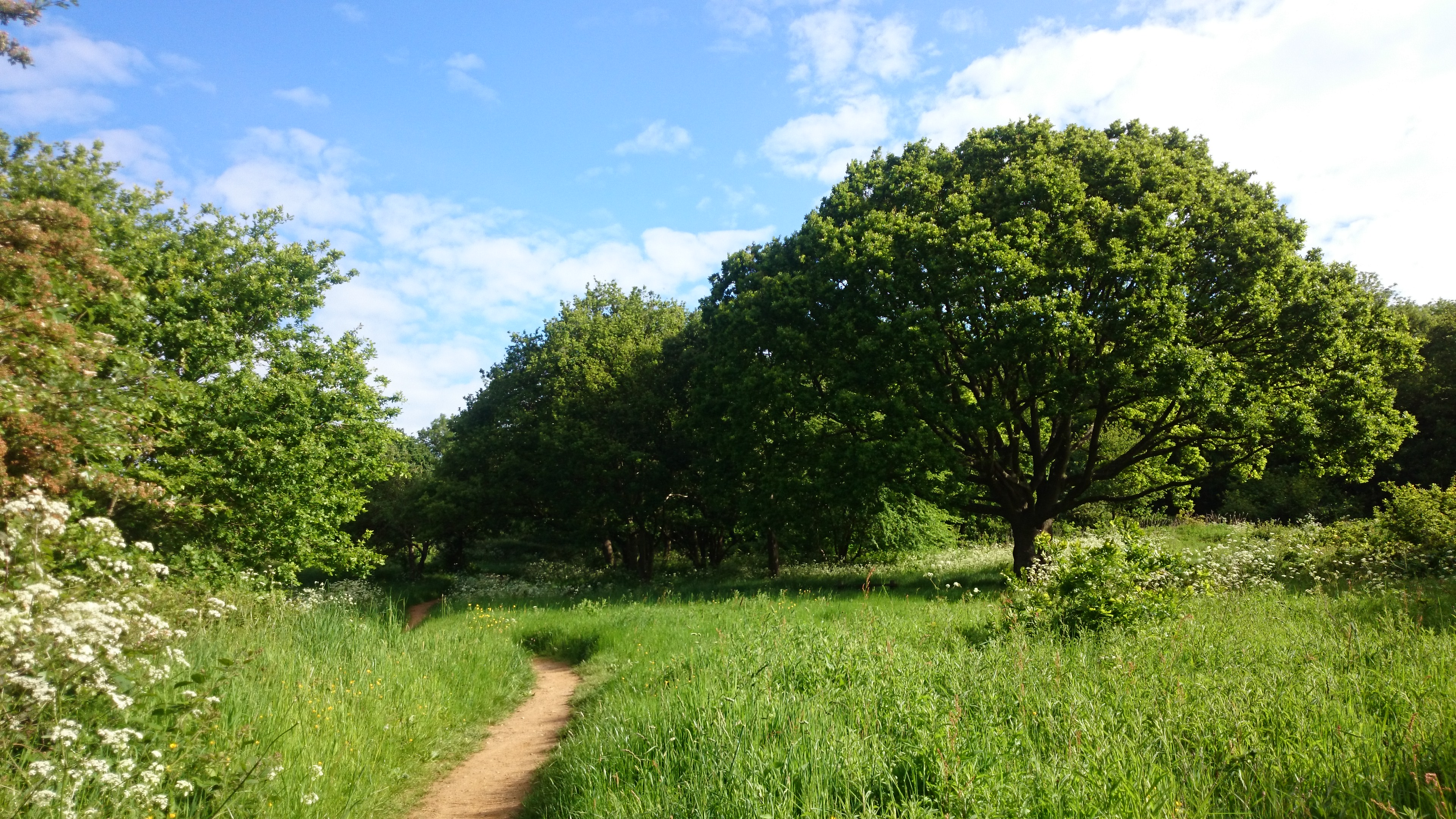
Horsenden Hill

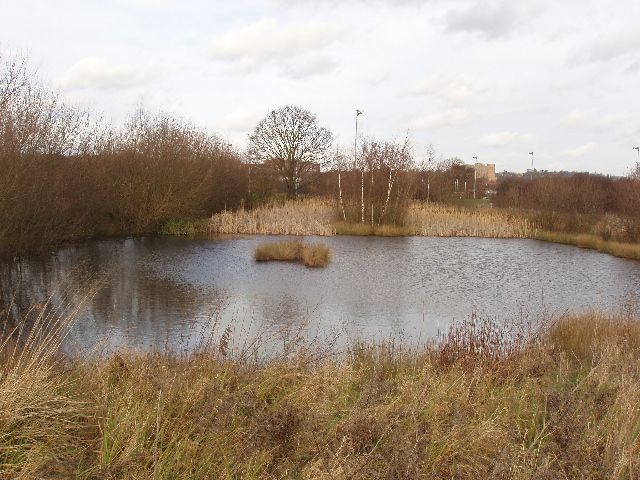
Pond

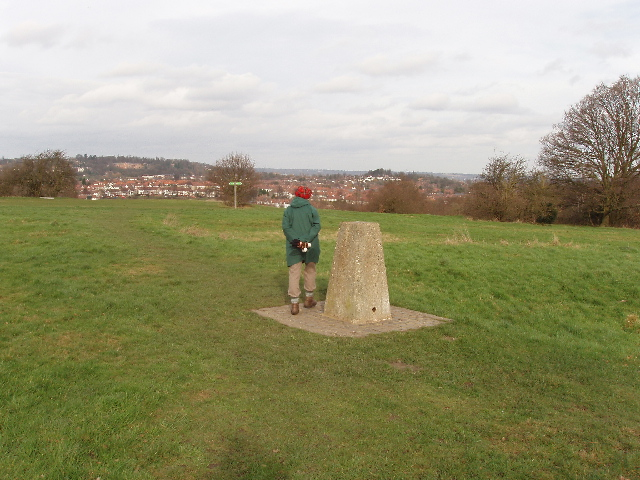
Trig point

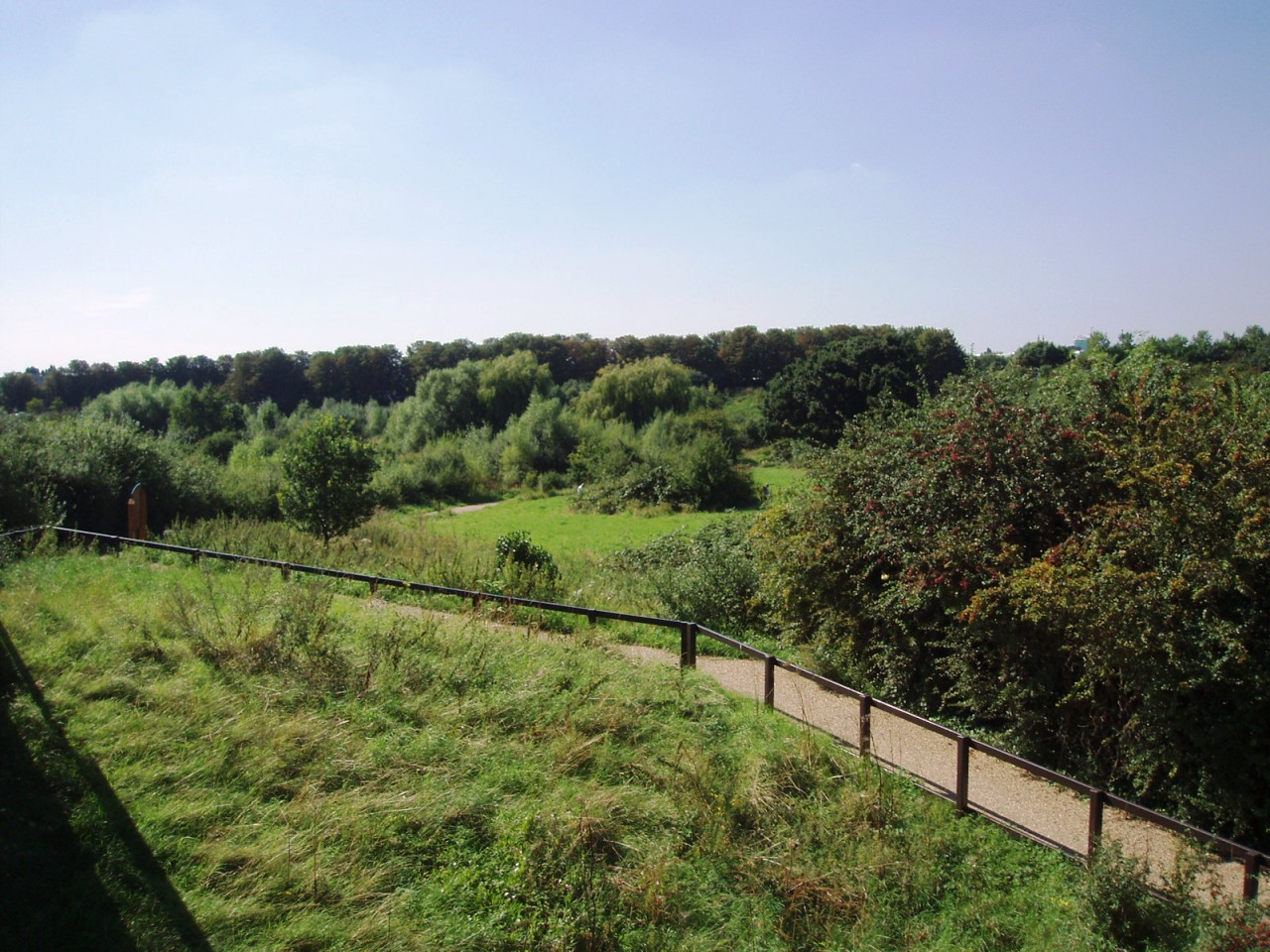
Horsenden Hill

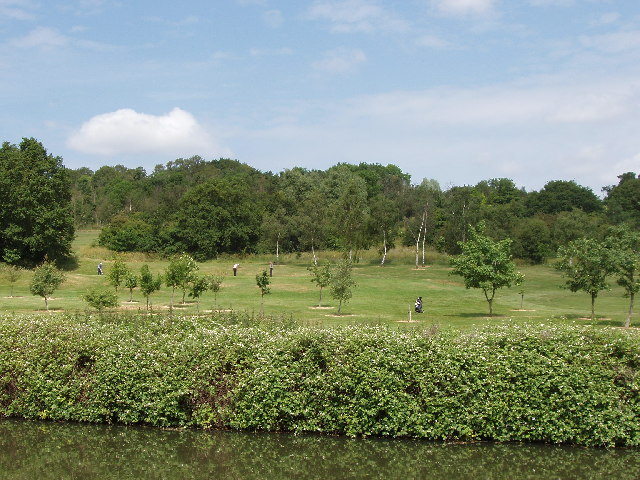
Sudbury Golf Course

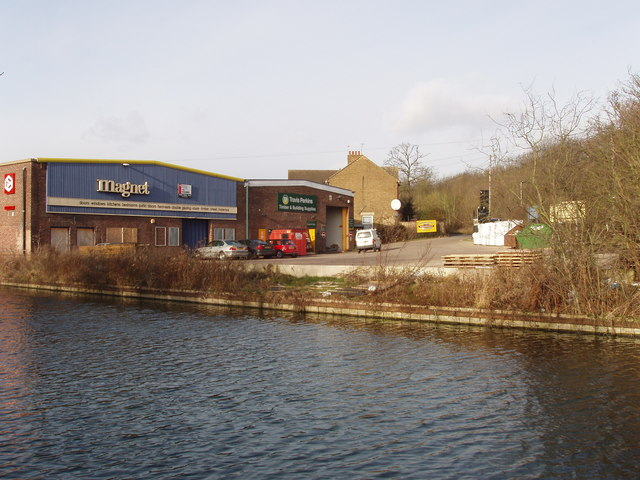
Commercial buildings by the canal at Horsenden Hill

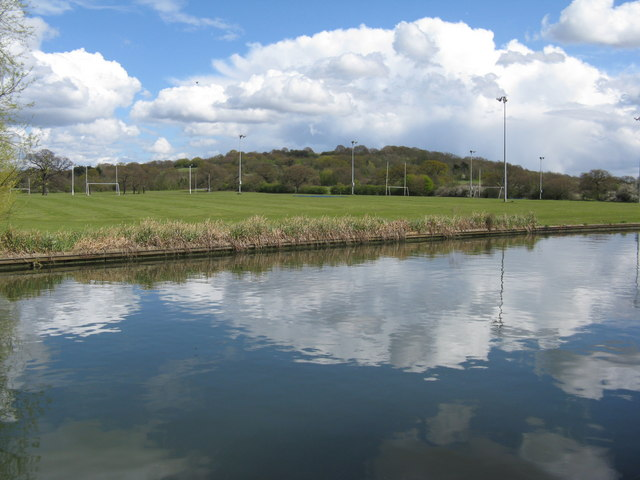
The summit of Horsenden Hill can be seen behind the GAA fields

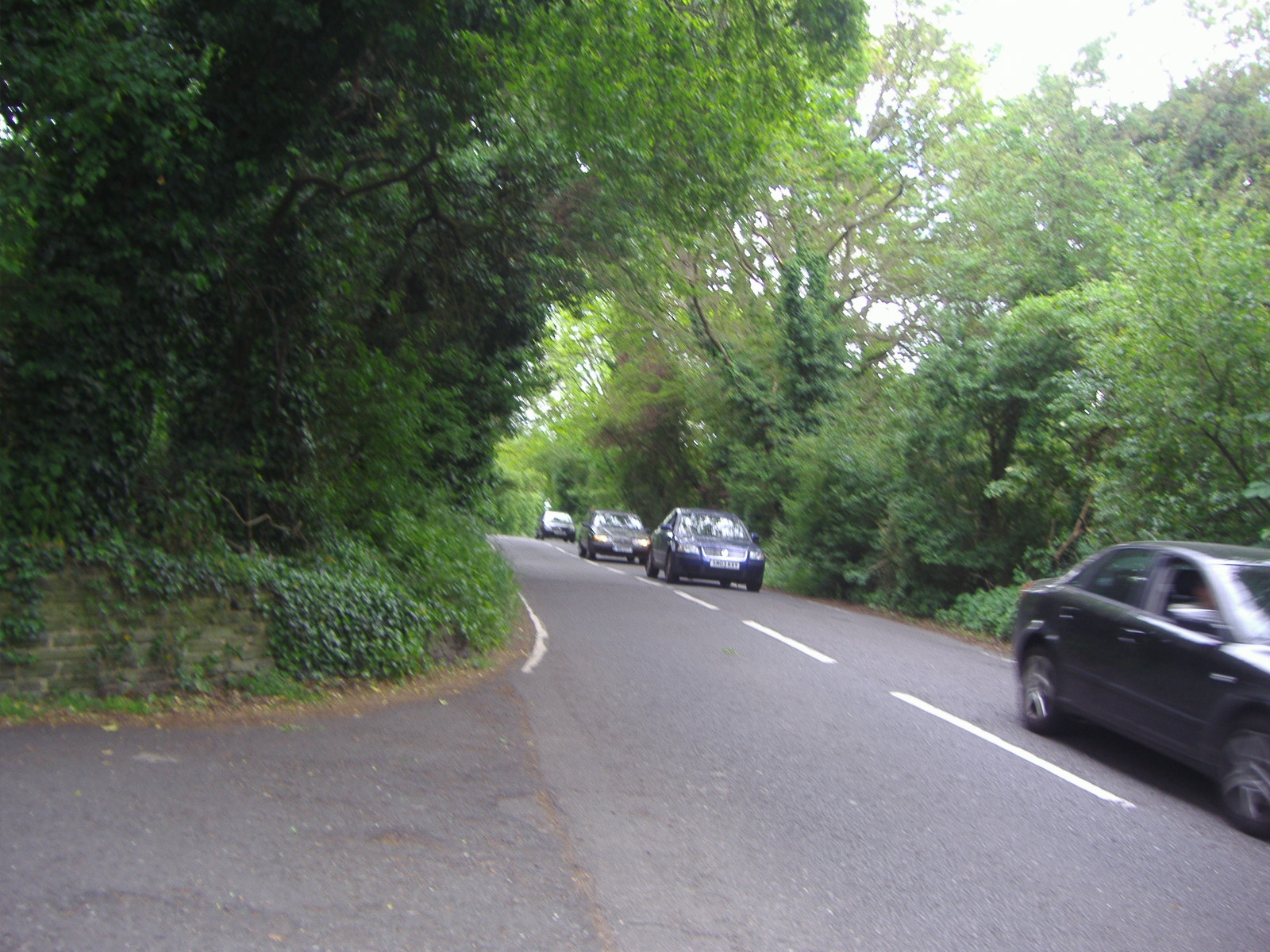
Horsenden Lane cuts through the area
