= Frederick Hooper =

Frederick Hooper or Fred Hooper may refer to:

- Fred Hooper (Murrawarri), chairman of the Murrawarri Republic, a "micronation" in Australia
- Frederick Hooper (adventurer), steward and youngest member of the Terra Nova Expedition to Antarctica in 1912
- Frederic Hooper (1892–1963) of the Hooper baronets, head of Schweppes
- Fred W. Hooper (1897–2000), American racehorse owner and breeder
