= Perivale =

Town in West London, England

Coordinates: 51.5383°N 0.3192°W

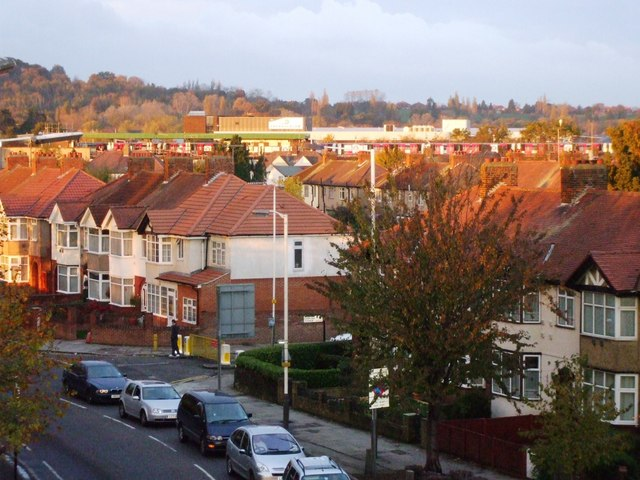
- Skyline of Perivale; the steep slope in the background is part of Horsenden Hill

- Location within Greater London
- Population: 15,339 (2011 Census. Ward)
- OS grid reference: TQ165835
- London borough: Ealing
- Ceremonial county: Greater London
- Region: London
- Country: England
- Sovereign state: United Kingdom
- Post town: GREENFORD
- Postcode district: UB6
- Dialling code: 020
- Police: Metropolitan
- Fire: London
- Ambulance: London
- UK Parliament: Ealing North
- London Assembly: Ealing and Hillingdon
- Councillors: Munir Ahmed, Labour; Tariq Mahmood, Labour; Charan Sharma, Labour

Perivale (/ˈpɛrɪˌveɪl/) is a mainly residential suburban town of Greater London, 9.5 miles (15.3 km) west of Charing Cross. It is the smallest of the seven towns which make up the London Borough of Ealing.

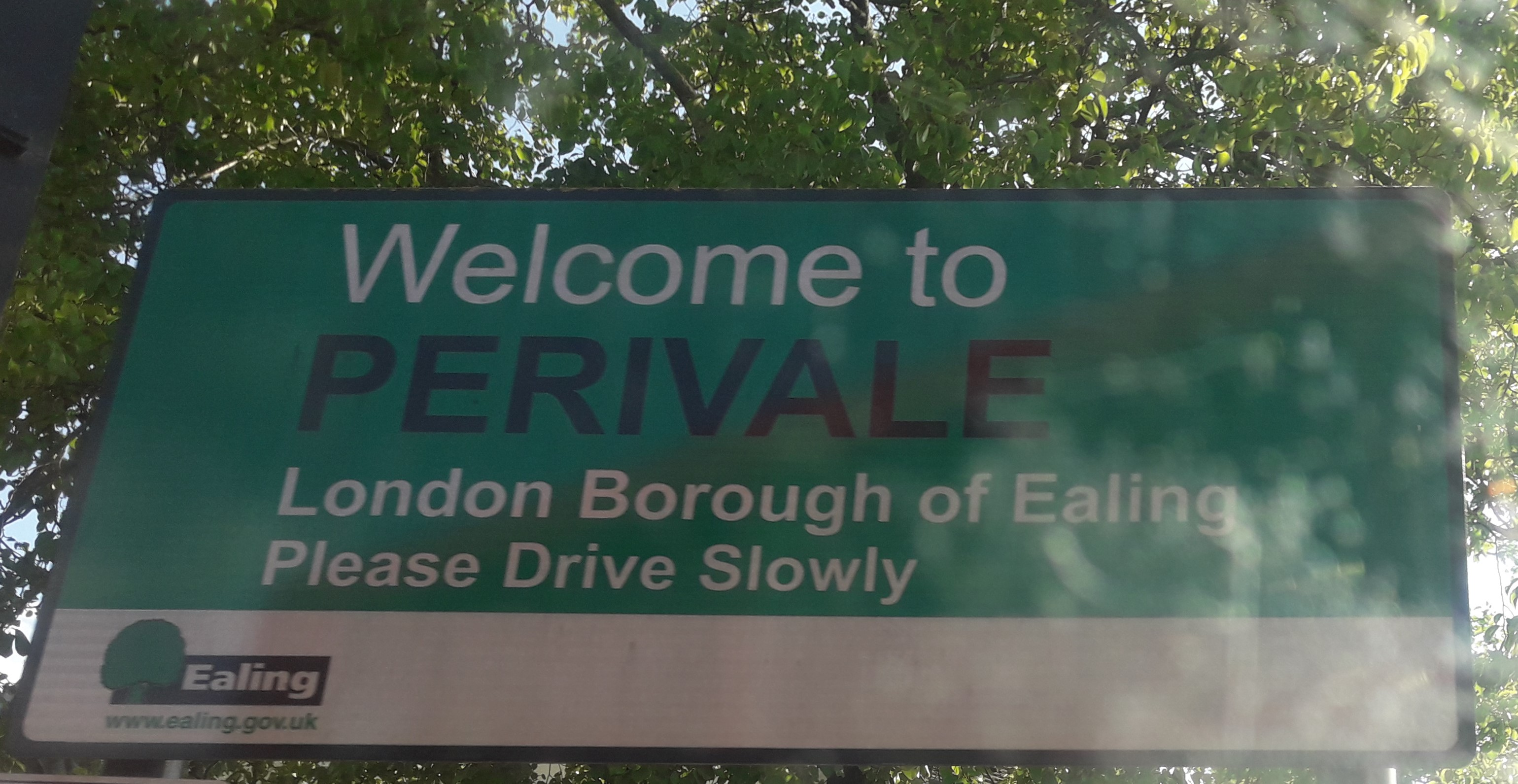
Sign at the entry to Perivale, Bilton Road (as approached from Alperton, London Borough of Brent).

Perivale is predominantly residential, with a library, community centre, a number of parks and open spaces, as well as a large industrial estate. Landmarks include the grade II* listed Art Deco Hoover Building, as well as St Mary's Church (c. 12th century), Horsenden Hill park and Perivale Wood Local Nature Reserve run by the Selborne Society. Perivale forms part of the UB6 postcode area, along with Greenford.

== Toponymy ==
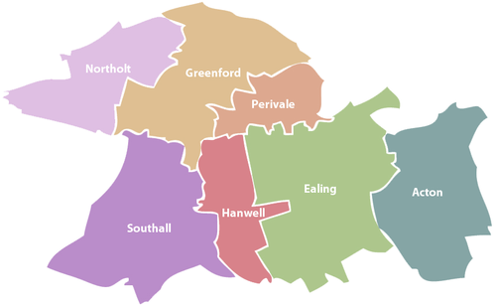
Map of the London Borough of Ealing, showing the location of Perivale, one of Ealing's seven major towns.

Perivale (parish) population
1881	34
1891	55
1901	60
1911	95
1921	114
Absorbed by Ealing parish ►
source: UK census

The name of Perivale was first used in 1508, where it was spelt "Pyryvale". The word seems to be a compound of perie (pear tree) and vale, a wide valley. Until then, Perivale was often called "Little Greenford" or "Greenford Parva", to distinguish it from its larger neighbour Great Greenford.

== History ==
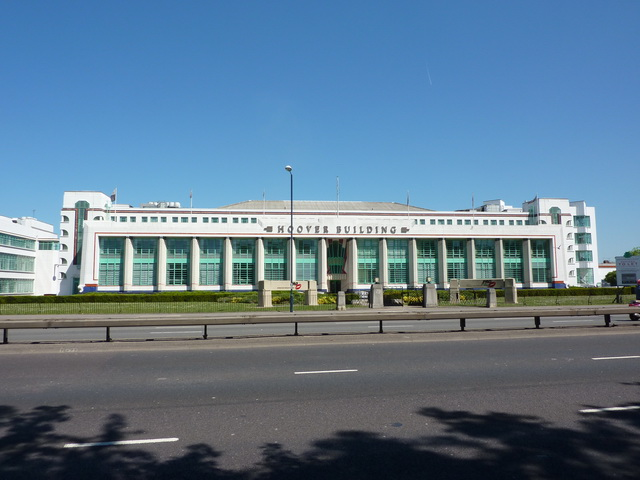
The Hoover Building

=== Origins and early history ===
Historically, it was a parish in the hundred of Elthorne, in the county of Middlesex. Perivale was one of the county's smallest parishes up until the early twentieth century, at just 633 acres (256 hectares) and a negligible population.

The church of St Mary's, Perivale is one of London's oldest churches, dating to at least the early thirteenth century. The church is south of the A40, off Perivale Lane. The neighbouring fifteenth-century Rectory House was demolished in 1958. Perivale was a farming area from at least the fourteenth century. At this date, Perivale consisted of woodland and fields used for arable farming.

During the fifteenth century, a grand, three-storey manor house, Perivale Manor, was commissioned by Henry Myllett, a prominent Perivale resident. The house was surrounded by a moat, gardens, orchards and outbuildings. Perivale Manor, which was close to St Mary's Church, was demolished around 1784.

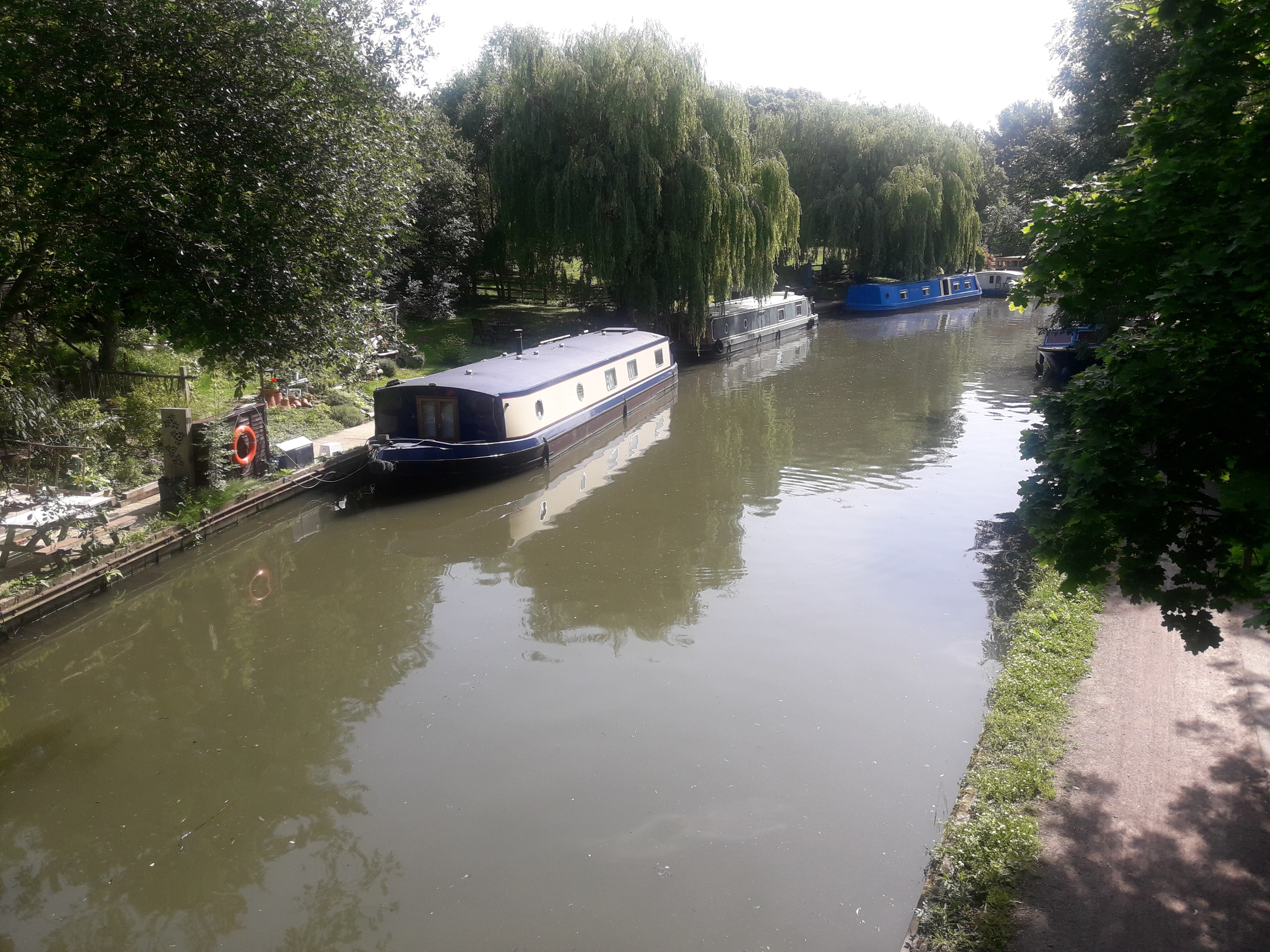
Canal boats on the Grand Union Canal at Perivale (at the junction of Horsenden Lane South/North).

From the sixteenth century, wheat was the main crop in the area, a crop for which Perivale gained a high reputation. With industrialisation, much of Perivale's land began to be used to grow grass for hay to feed London's horses. The building of the Paddington Branch of the Grand Union Canal in 1801 (which still runs through Perivale today) led to a high demand for Perivale's hay. By 1839, almost all of Perivale's land grew hay for the London market, a scene described in the ending of John Betjeman's poem Return to Ealing:

"...And a gentle gale from Perivale/blows up the hayfield scent."

The pre-twentieth-century population of Perivale remained low. Just 28 people lived in Perivale in 1801. An 1841 census recorded just five inhabited residential buildings, all farm houses; Horsenden Farm to the northwest, Grange Farm and Church Farm in the southwest, Manor Farm to the east and Alperton farm to the north. In 1901, the population remained tiny at 60 people.

=== Development and urbanisation, 1930s onwards ===
Things changed with transportation developments in an increasingly urban and expanding London. The A40 Western Avenue was built, running east–west across central and west London, cutting through Perivale. Perivale was also connected to central London via both Perivale train and the then named Alperton-Perivale Station (now Alperton Underground Station). Perivale's close proximity to central London and excellent transport links led to its rapid expansion, with many factories and houses being built. Houses were initially built in the centre of Perivale, on and around Horsenden Lane South and at Bilton Road to the east. The Medway Estate, to the west of Horsenden Lane South, was developed soon after with parkland left in the centre (now named Ealing Central Sports Ground).

The factory of Sanderson Wallpapers Ltd was built in 1929. By 1963, the firm employed almost 2,000 people. The iconic Hoover Building was opened in 1932 by Hoover Limited. Located on the northern side of the Western Avenue, the factory employed more than 3,000 people at its height of production in the 1960s, making vacuum cleaners and other household appliances. Sanderson's and Hoover were hailed as model factories, with workers enjoying enviable working conditions. Workers could purchase the reasonably priced local housing stock. Perivale's three-bedroom homes had front and rear gardens; many had garages, and sold for around £600-£700 freehold. By 1951, Perivale's population had jumped to 9,979. The Hoover Factory closed in the 1980s: part of the building was bought by Tesco, which opened as a superstore in the 1990s. The upper levels of the main building were recently converted into luxury flats.

Perivale Maternity Hospital, built in 1937 and demolished in 1988, was situated south of the A40 Western Avenue. Its location explains the large number of notable births in Perivale.

== Demography ==
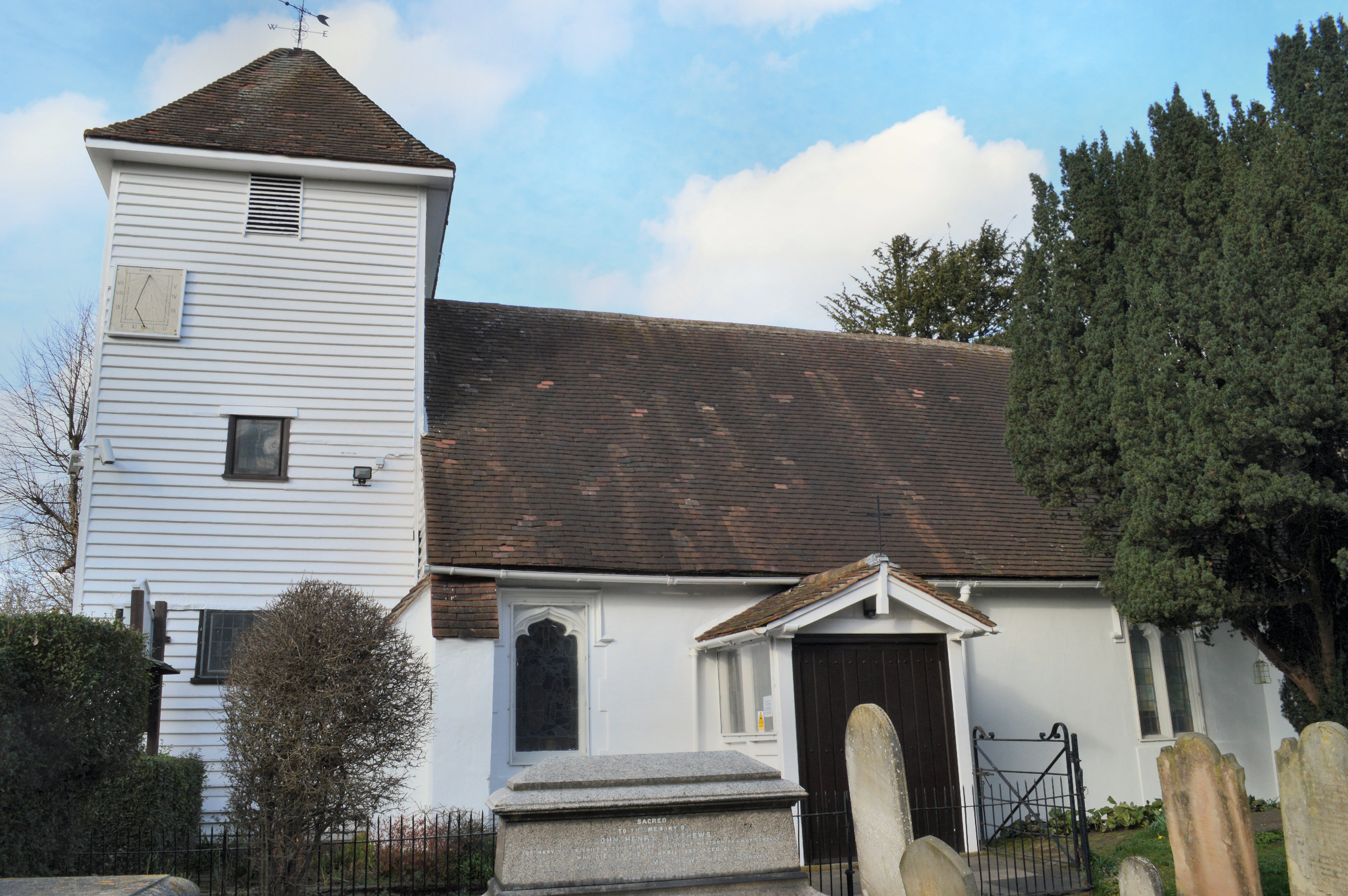
St Mary's Church

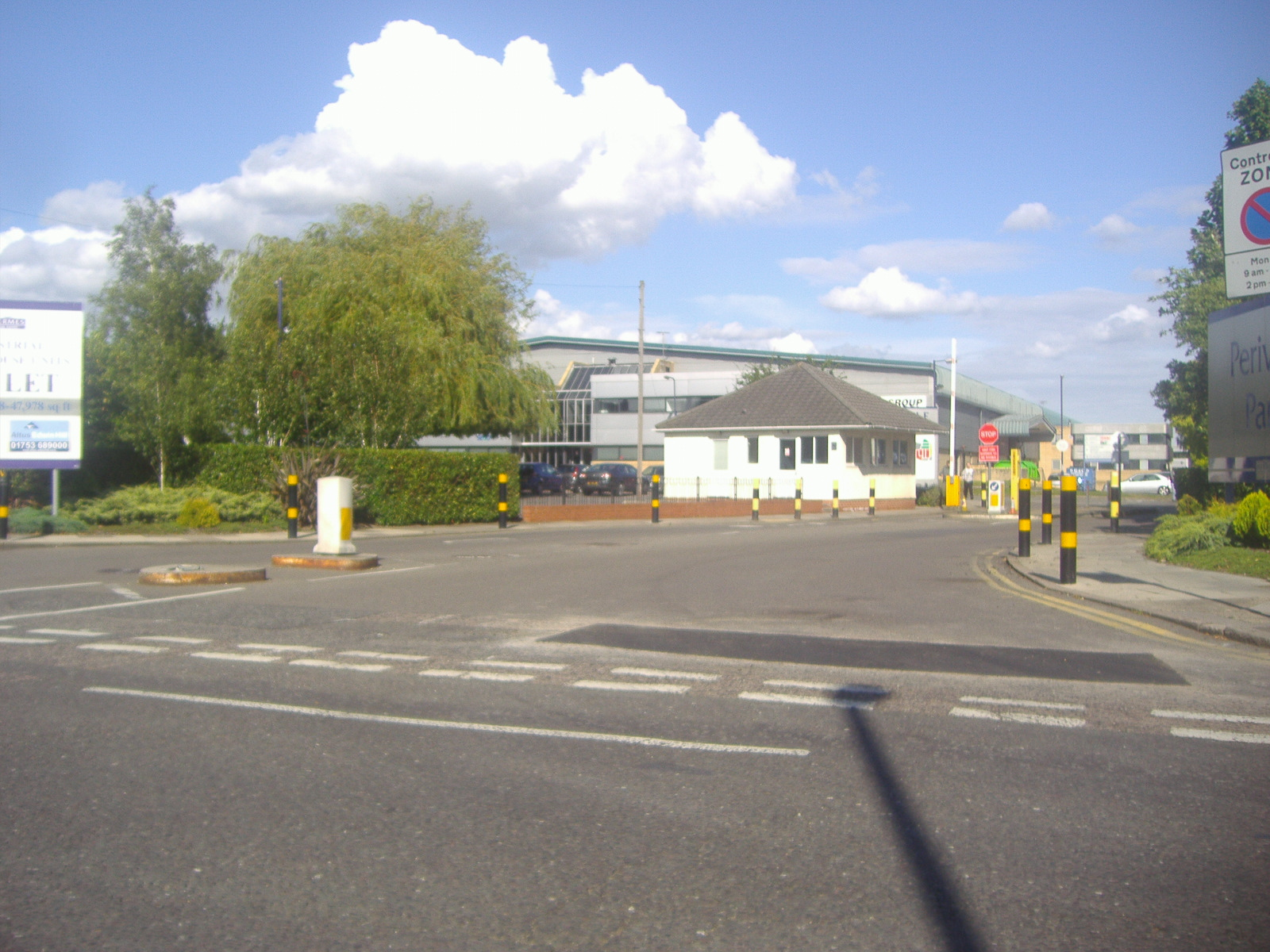
Entrance to the Perivale Industrial Park

The 2011 census showed Other White to be the largest ethnicity within Perivale at 22%. This is followed by White British, 20% and Indian at 15%. Perivale has the highest number of Polish residents in London. As such, the widest spoken foreign language in Perivale is Polish, the primary language of 2,024 residents.

Perivale has a relatively high rate of home ownership. 62% of households own their own home. 27% of homes are privately rented with just 9% of households living in rented social housing.

== Geography ==
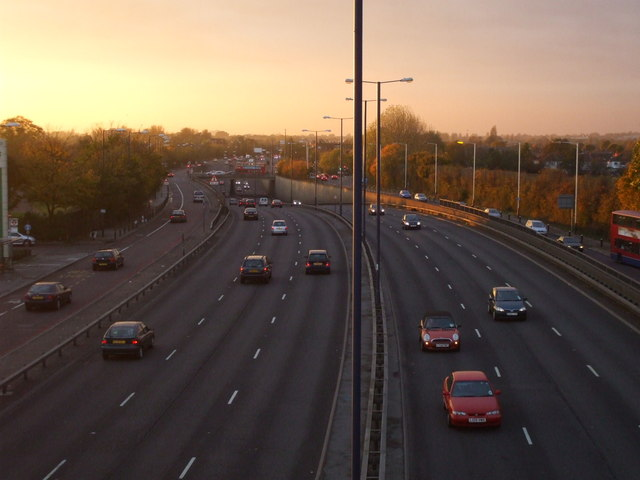
The A40 Western Avenue passes through Perivale

Although mainly residential, local shopping facilities can be found on Medway Parade within the Medway Estate and on Bilton Road. Perivale also has two industrial estates, Perivale Park (immediately north of Perivale Station, off Horsenden Lane South) and Perivale Industrial Estate, Aintree Road (between Bilton Road and the A40 Western Avenue).

== Sport, leisure and culture ==
=== Culture and leisure facilities ===
Perivale Library and Perivale Community Centre, are both located on Horsenden Lane South, close to Perivale Station. The BBC Archives are in Perivale.

Walking and cycling may be enjoyed along the Grand Union Canal which runs through the north of Perivale and the southern part of Horsenden Hill. London's Capital Ring, an orbital walking route, runs through Perivale along the canal (section 9, Greenford to South Kenton). Other Perivale parks include Ealing Central Sports Ground (a large park separating the Medway Estate and Bilton Road housing estates) Pear Tree Park and Perivale Park (home to an athletics track and gym, golf course with café, tennis courts, numerous ponds, the Nicky Hopkins memorial bench and an orchard garden, and through which the Capital Ring passes and Coston's brook and the river Brent flow).

==== Perivale Wood ====
Perivale Wood is one of the oldest Local Nature Reserves (LNR) in Britain, being managed since 1902. The wood was designated an LNR in 1974. Bordered by the canal on the north and Central line on the south side, the 11.6-hectare (29-acre) site is mainly old oak woodland, with areas of pasture and damp scrub, three ponds and two streams. The entrance is in Sunley Gardens.

==== Horsenden Hill ====
The large park and nature reserve of Horsenden Hill lies at the northern extent of Perivale (continuing into Greenford). The park has a number of children's playgrounds, The Gruffalo Trail and the old Horsenden Farm house and outbuildings which are home to a number of organisations including Perivale Brewery, Ealing Canoe Club, the Horsenden Craft Collective and Friends of Horsenden Hill. The Lower Thrifts part of Horsenden Hill, adjacent to Perivale Community Centre (accessed from Horsenden Lane South/Bilton Road), hosts Perivale's annual End of Summer Festival each September.

=== Sport ===
Perivale has two golf courses: Ealing Golf Club and Perivale Golf Course. Non-League football club Hanwell Town F.C. have been playing in Perivale's Reynolds Field since 1981, south of the A40 on Perivale Lane/Argyle Road. This is also the location of independent Ealing school St Benedict's playing field.

=== Education ===
Perivale has four primary schools: Perivale Primary School, St John Fisher Catholic Primary School, Selborne Primary School and Vicars Green Primary School.

== Transport ==
Perivale has excellent transport links into central London both via car and public transport. Other parts of Ealing and west London are easily accessible from Perivale.

=== Road ===
Perivale has easy access to central London by car via the A40 Western Avenue which can be accessed via. the Perivale and Hanger Lane junctions (and various points in between). The Hanger Lane gyratory system, just outside Perivale to the east, provides access to the North Circular Road (A4006) Hanger Lane.

=== Public Transport ===
Perivale Underground Station (Central line) is in the centre of Perivale, on Horsenden Lane South. Trains run every 3–5 minutes at most times connecting Perivale to Westfield London (11 minutes to White City station), Notting Hill Gate (17 minutes) and Marble Arch (for Hyde Park and Oxford Street, 22 minutes) all within a 25-minute travel time. Additionally, to the east of Bilton Road, Alperton Underground Station (Alperton, London Borough of Brent) lies just across the Perivale-Alperton border. This is connected to the rest of Perivale via the 297 bus route and gives direct access to giving access to Uxbridge, Hammersmith and central London via the Piccadilly line. South Greenford Railway Station, lies just outside of Perivale, southeast on the A40 (south side).

Three bus routes serve Perivale. The 297 (24 hr) service runs via Bilton Road, Horsenden Lane South and the Argyle Road (W13) via Perivale Station to central Ealing, and into northwest London via Alperton Station, Wembley and Willesden. The 95 bus runs along the A40 via Acton to Shepherd's Bush. The E5 serves the Medway Estate and Perivale Tesco, running to Southall via Greenford.

=== Canal ===
The Grand Union Canal, Paddington Branch runs through Perivale at the north of the town providing pedestrian (part of the Capital Ring walking route), cycle and boat connections to other parts of London.

== Literature and the media ==
Perivale is one of the settings of Anthony Trollope's novel The Belton Estate (1865).

Perivale appears in John Betjeman's 1954 poem Middlesex as a “parish of enormous hayfields”

Perivale was the setting for the 1989 season twenty-six Doctor Who serial Survival as the hometown of the Seventh Doctor's companion Ace. There were several locations used in and around Perivale during filming, including Bleasdale Avenue, Medway Parade, Colwyn Avenue, Woodhouse Avenue, Children's Play Area, Ealing Central Sports Ground, Horsenden Lane South, and the nearby Horsenden Hill. Victorian Perivale was also the location for establishing shots of a manor which was the setting of another season twenty-six serial, Ghost Light.

Parts of the film Snatch were filmed in Perivale and on the nearby Horsenden Hill.

Henry Perowne, the principal character in Ian McEwan's novel Saturday, was born in Perivale. Only Fools and Horses used Horsenden Hill for location shooting in the episode where Del Boy and Rodney 'look after' Marlene and Boycie's dog (only to feed it reheated pork and give it food poisoning).

== Notable people ==
- Tina Daheley, BBC journalist and presenter, lived in Perivale
- Alan Devonshire, former West Ham and England footballer, lived in Perivale
- Neal Foulds, snooker player and commentator, lived in Perivale
- Leena Gade, first female race engineer to win the 24 Hours of Le Mans, was born in Perivale
- Kerry Godliman, comedian, actor, was born in Perivale
- Antony Hooper, cricketer, was born in Perivale
- Nicky Hopkins (1944–1994), session pianist (for The Kinks, The Beatles, and The Rolling Stones and many others), was born in Perivale
- Derek Marlowe (1938–1996), playwright, novelist, screenwriter, was born in Perivale
- Lee McQueen, The Apprentice winner 2008, was born in Perivale
- Carole Middleton, mother of Catherine, Princess of Wales, was born in Perivale
- Tom Newman, record producer (of Mike Oldfield's Tubular Bells and others), was born in Perivale
- Richard Oakes, guitarist of indie band Suede, was born in Perivale
- Jeff Stevenson, comedian, lived in Perivale
- Janet Street-Porter, journalist and TV personality, lived in Perivale
- Chris Thomas, record producer (of The Beatles, The Sex Pistols and others), was born in Perivale
- Rick Wakeman, musician, Yes keyboardist, was born in Perivale
- Robin Leach, American entertainment reporter and writer, was born in Perivale

== Local government ==
The Perivale ward has three elected councillors to Ealing London Borough Council: Munir Ahmed (elected 2014), Tariq Mahmood (elected 2014), and Charan Sharma (elected 2014). Munir Ahmed was elected Deputy Mayor for the municipal year 2019/2020 and 2020/2021 and then on 18 May 2021 he was elected Mayor of The London Borough of Ealing for 2021/2022. Munir Ahmed is the first ever councillor from Perivale to become the Mayor.

The Metropolitan Police have a vehicle impound at Walmgate Road in Perivale.

On 1 October 1926 the civil parish was abolished and merged with Ealing. At the 1921 census (the last before the abolition of the parish), Perivale had a population of 114.
