= Selborne Society =

British conservation organisation

The Selborne Society or Selborne League is Britain's oldest national conservation organization and a registered charity. It was formed in November 1885 to "perpetuate the name and interests of Gilbert White, the Naturalist of Selborne", and followed the philosophy of observation rather than collection. Its object was the preservation of birds, plants and pleasant places.

The society was founded by George Arthur Musgrave (1843 – 29 August 1912) and his wife Theresa of Torquay in Devon and it was inspired by Gilbert White's well-known book, The Natural History and Antiquities of Selborne. It amalgamated with the Plumage League which had been founded by the Reverend Francis Orpen Morris and Lady Mount Temple in January 1886 with the full title of the Selborne Society for the Preservation of Birds, Plants and Pleasant Places while the campaigners against the use of birds for fashion formed the Plumage Section with royal patronage from Princess Christian, daughter of Queen Victoria. From 1887 it started producing the Selborne Letters as well as the Selborne Magazine. The organization became more organized after a meeting held on 26 January 1888, when Alfred, Lord Tennyson was appointed as president. The aim of "education" was added at this meeting. The Selborne Magazine was retitled as Nature Notes from 1890 under the editorship of Percy Myles and James Britten. After Britten's death in 1897 the editor was G. S. Boulger. The Parkinson Society founded in 1884 by Juliana Horatia Ewing to encourage wild gardening and the survival of endangered species also merged into the Selborne Society.

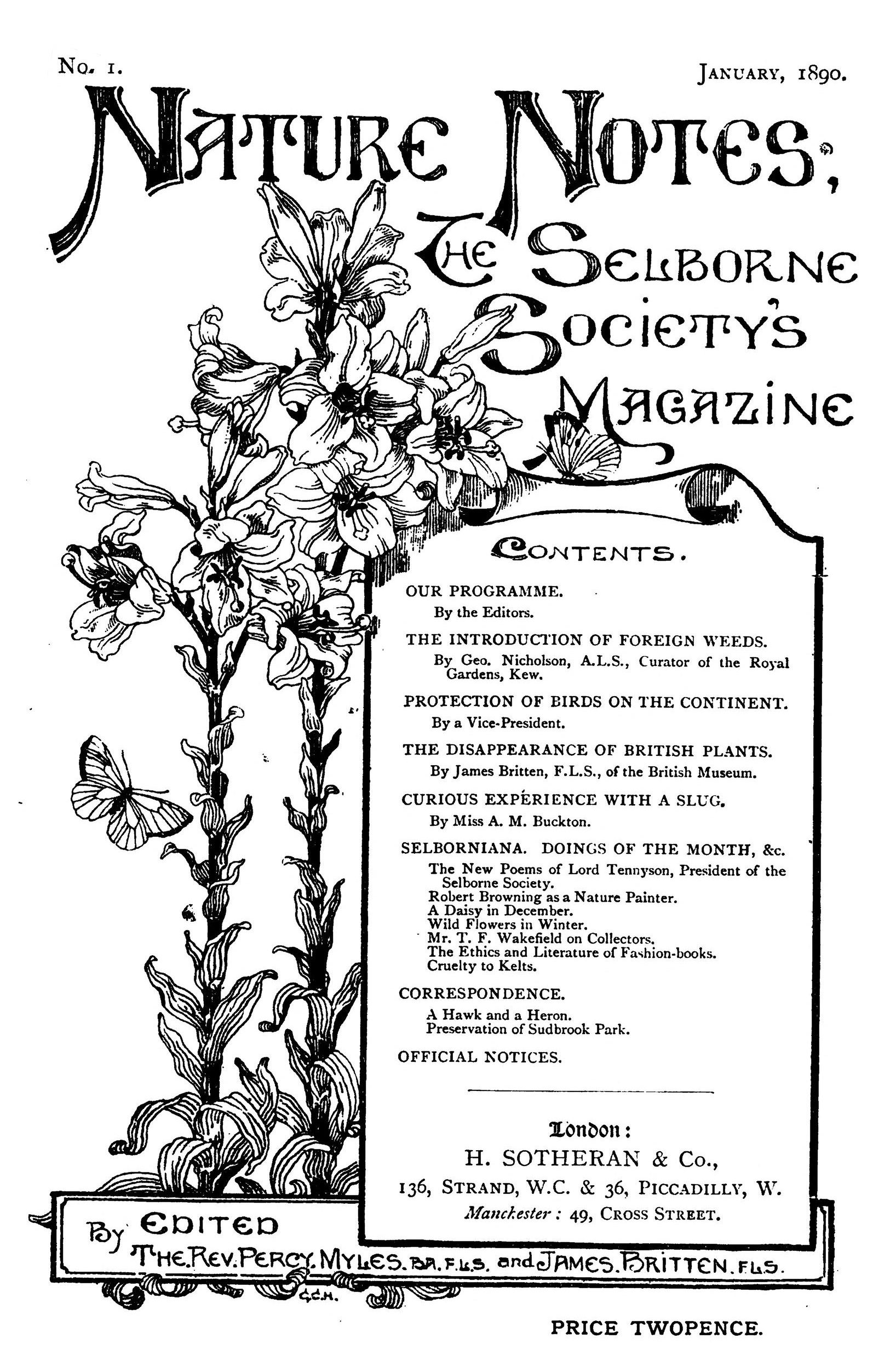
Cover of Nature Notes (1890)

Robert Hunter and Hardwicke Rawnsley, members of the Society, joined Octavia Hill to form the National Trust in 1895 to preserve "pleasant places". The Plumage League spawned similar groups like the Society for the Protection of Birds in Didsbury, Manchester, and the "Fur, Fin and Feather Folk" in Croydon. These two merged in May 1891 to become the Society for Protection of Birds, which became the Royal Society for the Protection of Birds in 1904. From 1919 to 1939 the role of education became a primary one and the society went beyond natural history to become a lecture bureau that covered science, history and exploration.

== Activities ==
Historically, the Selborne Society worked with the local legislature to encourage policies on conservation and environmentalism. It was one of the first organizations to raise public awareness in England concerning environmental issues, and acted as a leading example to international movements such as the American Ornithological Society. Although the Society originated from Selborne, it gained national popularity and soon established branches across the United Kingdom.

Today, the Selborne Society owns and operates Perivale Wood Local Nature Reserve in London.

=== Reserves ===
The Selborne Society purchased local land enclosures for posterity in cultivating rare animal and plant wildlife. Volunteers were enlisted to maintain the enclosures and to report on the progress of reclaiming endangered species from extinction. In 1923, land in the Perivale Wood was purchased and memorialized to Gilbert White by an anonymous donor for approximately £5000. This reserve now houses more than 600 species of fungi, nearly 300 species of plant life, and has been visited by over 100 species of birds, including rare species like the northern gannet. Preservation also spanned into buildings of cultural importance, such as Tintern Abbey.

Preservation of the natural landscape was also advocated by the Selborne Society, such as lauding the actions of the Hills Conservators who purchased a quarry in Malvern Hills to prevent the mountain range's disfigurement. Afforestation of East Anglia was also encouraged, as shown by the Society's approval of the region's progressive woodland farmers who cultivated quick-growing willow trees.

=== Protests ===
The Society actively utilized legal pressure to further their goals in protecting the environment. Rampant advertising, the draining of marshes, and the hunting of rare birds were often the target of criticism for the League. In 1893, the Society drafted an advertisement regulation bill to the local parliament and suggested boycotting commodities advertised offensively. In 1903, The Society hired paid inspectors to investigate 1,298 cases of smoke pollution and report these to the local authorities. Protests also surfaced through public outcry in the Society's published magazine, usually in the form of letters to the editor.

Trophy hunters were also another target for the Society's protest. In 1901, articles produced by the Nature Notes pushed for the protection of badgers and polecats which were hunted to endangered levels in the English countryside. Plume hunters also faced heavy criticism for over hunting of the wood-warbler and goldcrest species of birds.

=== Lectures ===
The Selborne Society sponsored free public lectures to further awareness of environmental preservation. Led by doctorate intellectuals in England, the lecture topics spanned botany, ornithology, zoology, and geological history.

=== Magazines ===
The Selborne Society published a members-only magazine for nearly three decades.

==== Nature Notes ====
Nature Notes was first published in January 1890.

The magazine acted as a record of progress in the knowledge of natural objects and environmental awareness. Its editors combined scientific accuracy with digestible topics to further the Society's goal of informing the public of environmental issues of international policies, laws, or other concerns that could threaten natural species. Abstracts of scientific reports, correspondence between noted authorities, and sketch competitions were utilized to encourage public interest in environmental pursuits. Poems, letters, and observations of the environment were published from the Society's members and local hobbyists. Editors also provided reviews of local and international conservation movements, critiquing their contributions to the global environmentalist efforts.

== International response ==
The Selborne Society acted as a model for international environmental movements. The American Audubon Society and American Ornithologists' Union Committee on Bird-Protection cited the Selborne Society as the main model for addressing environmental awareness in the United States. The Society also published international correspondence in its magazine from botanist and zoologist enthusiasts across Europe and as distant as Ceylon, India.

== Finances ==
The Selborne Society was funded almost exclusively by its members; in 1900, over 90% of the society's annual income of £41 came from subscriptions and donations, worth a total of $30,486 when adjusted for inflation. By 1924, over 60% of the society's income came from the sales of Nesting Boxes and Bird Baths. The World Wars had a drastic impact on the Society's income due to the necessity of the war effort, forcing many of its branches to cease function by the 1950s.
