= Vera Palmer =

Vera Palmer may refer to:

- Vera Jayne Palmer (known as Jayne Mansfield; 1933–1967), actress
- Vera Palmer (athlete) in 1926 Women's World Games
