= Plumage League =

Defunct animal welfare organisation

A Plumage League to campaign against the excessive use of birds' feathers and plumage in ladies fashions was formed by Reverend Francis Orpen Morris and Lady Mount Temple in December 1885. This almost immediately amalgamated to form the Plumage Section of the Selborne Society for the Preservation of Birds, Plants and Pleasant Places in the following January.

Another plumage league was later formed by Emily Williamson in Didsbury. This was organised by Mancunian women unable to join the male British Ornithological Union as the Society for Protection of Birds which subsequently became the RSPB.
