= Ealing Southall and Middlesex Athletics Club =

British athletic club

Ealing Southall & Middlesex Athletics Club
- Founded: 1966
- Ground: Perivale Park Athletics Track
- Location: Stockdove Way, Perivale, Greenford UB6 8TJ, West London, England
- Coordinates: 51°31′57″N 0°20′15″W
- Website: official website

Ealing, Southall & Middlesex Athletics Club (known as ESMAC, or ESM for short) is an athletics club based in Ealing, West London, England. It is based at the Perivale Park Athletics Track. The club competes at all levels in senior and junior road racing, cross country, and track and field.

== History ==
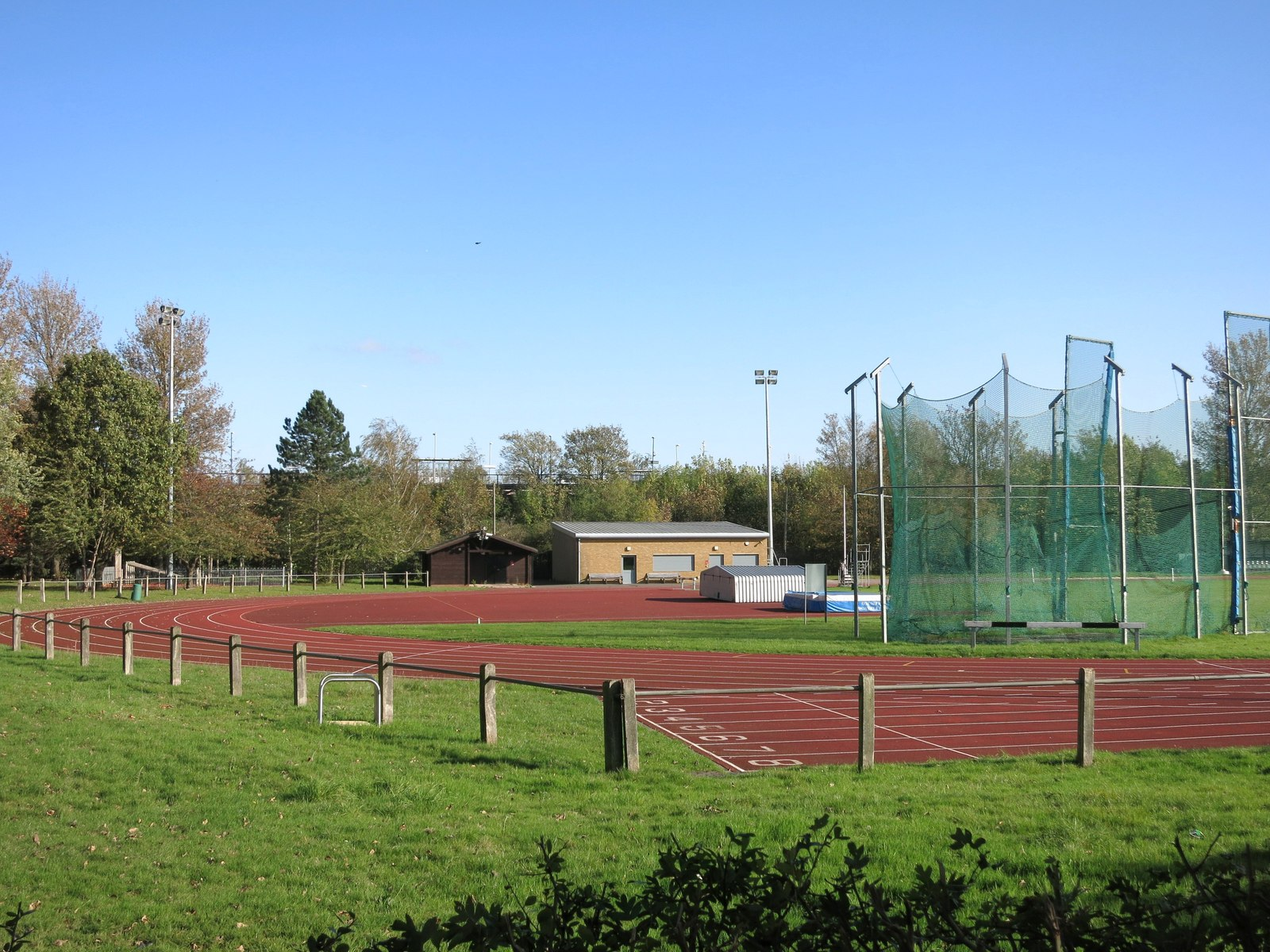
the track in 2014

The origins of the club derive from the formation of two clubs called Ealing Harriers (who were established in 1920) and Southall AC (who were founded in 1931).

In 1966 an amalgamation of the two clubs took place to form the Ealing & Southall AC, although the move did not please everybody because the Southall president George Brogden quit as a consequence of the merger.

On 1 January 1994 the club amalgamated with another local club, Middlesex Ladies Club (originally formed in 1923) and the name that is used today was taken.

Kelly Holmes won two Olympic gold medals as a member of the club in 2004, she still holds the Club's record at 400m, 800m, 1500m, and the mile.

== Notable members ==
=== Olympians ===
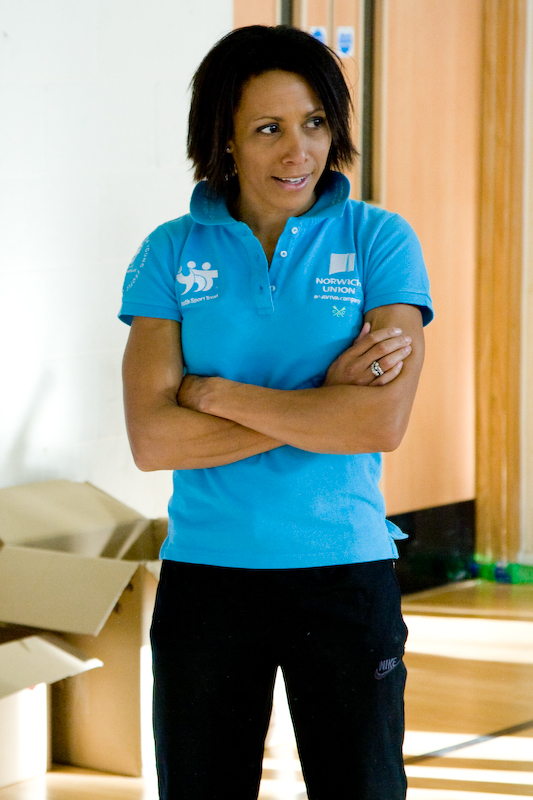
Dame Kelly Holmes

Athlete	Club	Events	Games	Medals/Pos, Ref
Georgia Bell	ESM	1500m	2024	Bronze medal
Kelly Holmes	Middlesex Ladies/ESM	800, 1500m	1996, 2000, 2004	Gold medal Gold medal Bronze medal

=== Commonwealth Games ===
Athlete	Club	Events	Games	Medals/Pos, Ref
Ethel Raby	Middlesex LAC	long jump, relay	1938	Silver medal Silver medal

=== Olympiad/World Games ===
Athlete	Club	Events	Games	Medals/Pos, Ref
Vera Palmer	Middlesex LAC	250m	1926	Silver medal
