= Perivale Park Athletics Track =

Athletics venue in London

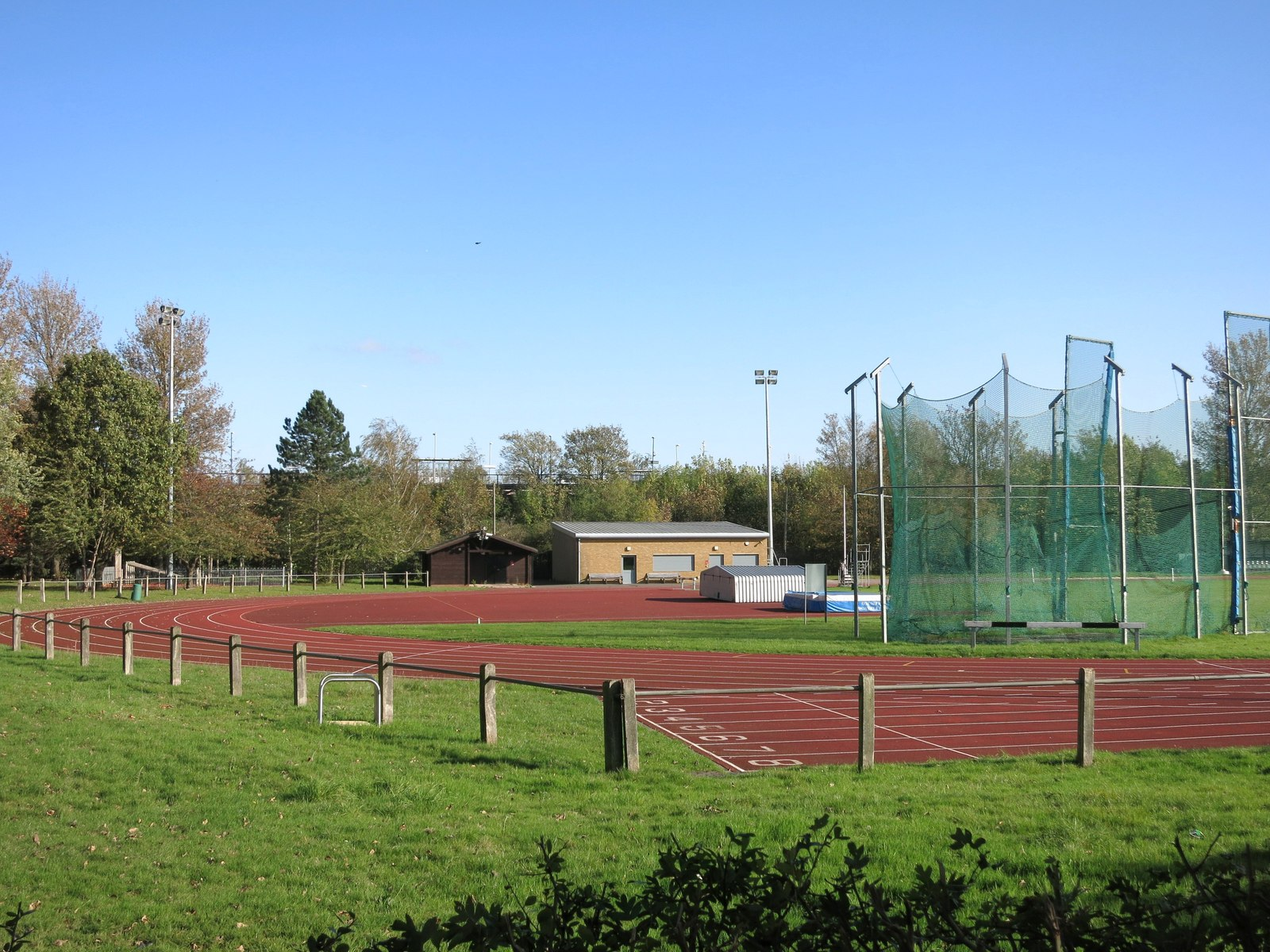
- Interactive map of Perivale Park Athletics Track
- Location: Stockdove Way, Perivale, Greenford UB6 8TJ, West London, England
- Coordinates: 51°31′57″N 0°20′15″W

Tenants
- Ealing Southall and Middlesex Athletics Club; West London Hammer School

Perivale Park Athletics Track is an athletics track in Ealing, West London, England. It is the home of Ealing, Southall and Middlesex Athletics Club and the West London Hammer School.

== History ==
In 1987 a new tartan Polyflex 950-4 porous synthetic surface track was laid at Perivale Park costing £500,000. The Ealing Sports Trust set up the centre to enable the development and provision of an athletics centre in the area. One of the trustees was Seb Coe.

The official opening ceremony took place during October 1987 and was opened by Linford Christie and Tessa Sanderson. In 2002 a high fence was erected around the entire track and in 2004 the track was resurfaced costing £147,000.

== See also ==
Pear Tree Park
