= Francis Orpen Morris =

Anglo-Irish clergyman (1810–1893)

The Reverend Francis Orpen Morris
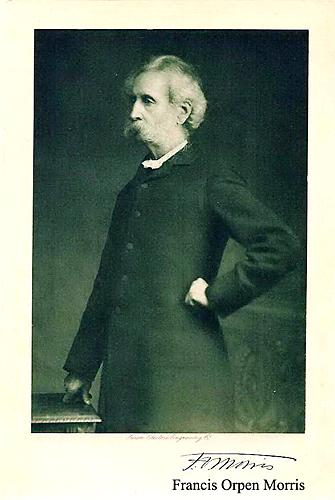
- Born: 25 March 1810; Cobh near Cork, Ireland
- Died: 10 February 1893 (aged 82); Nunburnholme, England
- Occupation: Vicar
- Known for: Ornithologist, entomologist, and author
- Spouse: Anne Sanders
- Children: 3 sons and 6 daughters

Francis Orpen Morris (25 March 1810 – 10 February 1893) was an Anglo-Irish clergyman, notable as "parson-naturalist" (ornithologist and entomologist) and as the author of many children's books and books on natural history and heritage buildings. He was a pioneer of the movement to protect birds from the plume trade and was a co-founder of the Plumage League. He died on 10 February 1893 and was buried at Nunburnholme, East Riding of Yorkshire, England.

== Early life ==
Morris was the eldest son of Rear Admiral Henry Gage Morris, a senior-ranking officer in the Royal Navy, and Rebecca Orpen, youngest daughter of the Rev. Francis Orpen, vicar of Kilgarvan, County Kerry. Francis Orpen Morris grew up on the western shores of Ireland where he developed an enduring love of the natural world. The whole family relocated to England in 1824. After living for some time in Worcester, they settled in Charmouth, Dorset in 1826.

Francis Orpen Morris' grandfather was Colonel Roger Morris, a member of the Governor's council of New York, who married George Washington's early love interest, Mary Philipse. Mary had inherited one third of a vast estate, the Philipse Patent, 160,000 acres on the Hudson River. Roger and Mary's land was confiscated following the Revolutionary War. Later, John Jacob Astor traced the three surviving children (including Henry Gage Morris) of Roger and Mary Morris (the others had died without heirs) and bought out any claim they had to the land. Astor proved in court that the State had no legal right to confiscate the land in the first place. Mary had set up a trust for her unborn children two weeks before she married Roger, the Morris' had a legally binding life lease that was passed from generation to generation. Astor eventually sold it to the State of New York for a massive profit.

== Education ==
At Bromsgrove School his love of natural history grew, and he started a collection of birds and insects. He left school in 1828, spent a year with a private tutor, and enrolled at Worcester College, Oxford. Here he read Classics and was awarded a BA in 1833. Among the subjects he studied was Pliny's Natural History. During this period he met the entomologist James Duncan (1804–1861), author of British Butterflies. As a student Morris maintained his interest in natural history, and helped organise the insect collection in Oxford's Ashmolean Museum.

== Church ==
He entered the Church and was appointed as curate at Hanging Heaton near Dewsbury in 1834, before being ordained priest by the Archbishop of York in 1835. He was then curate at Taxal, Cheshire (1836), Christ Church in Doncaster (1836), and between 1837 and 1842 he was a curate at All Hallows, Ordsall in Retford before moving to Crambe, North Yorkshire (1842). In November 1844, he became vicar of Nafferton near Driffield in East Yorkshire, where he remained for nine years, and acted as chaplain to the Duke of Cleveland. In 1854 he moved to the Rectory of Nunburnholme, near Market Weighton in East Yorkshire where he stayed until his death in 1893. Here he had ample leisure to pursue his interests in natural history.

== Writing ==
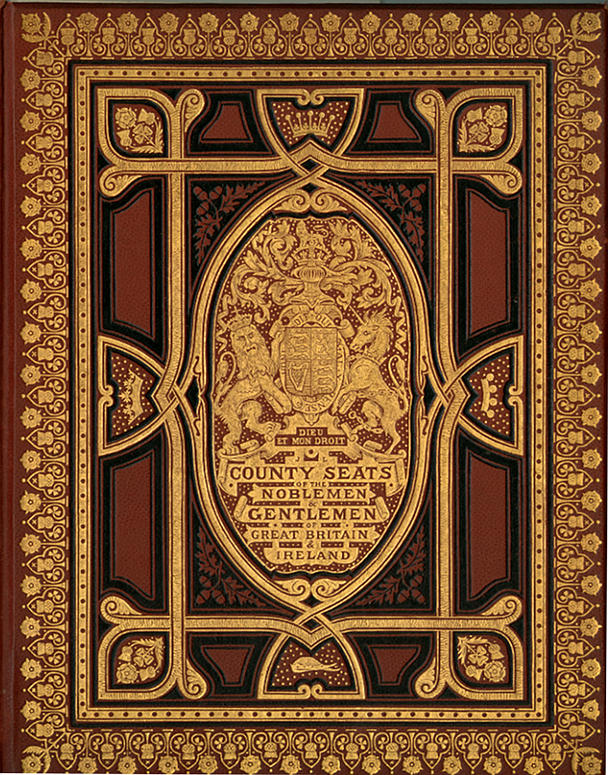
County Seats of The Noblemen and Gentlemen of Great Britain and Ireland (1870)

During his stay at Nafferton, Morris acquired a reputation for writing popular essays on natural history and in particular on birds. His first book was an arrangement of British birds and was published in 1834. About this time he formed a close working association with Benjamin Fawcett (1808–1893), a local printer. This relationship would last nearly 50 years and have a profound effect on British ornithology. Benjamin Fawcett was arguably the most accomplished of nineteenth century woodblock colour printers.

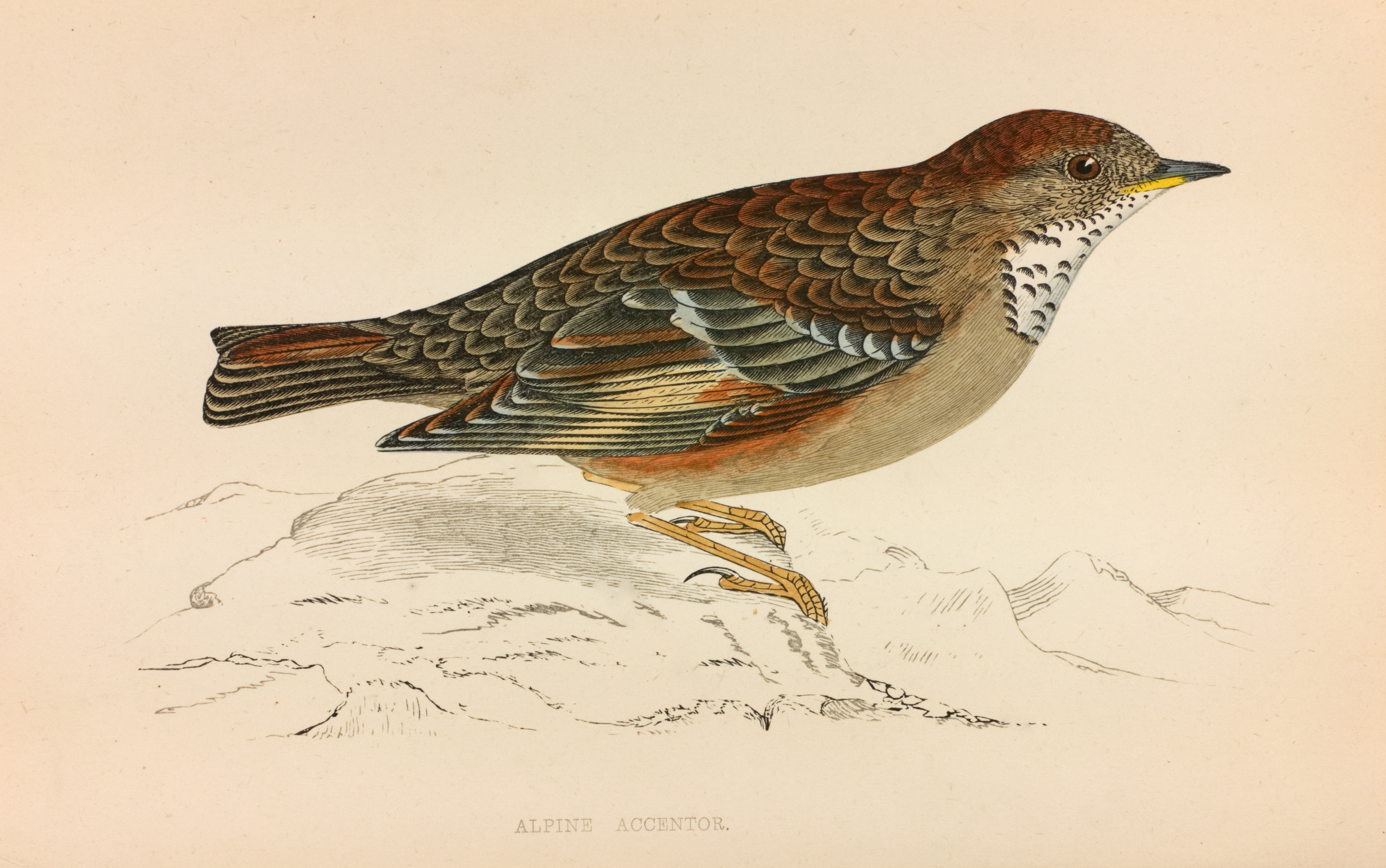
Alpine Accentor. Hand coloured, wood-block print by Alexander Francis Lydon for 'A History of British Birds' by Francis Orpen Morris. First Edition published by Groombridge & Son. London 1850–1857. Printed by Benjamin Fawcett in Driffield. From the collection held by RestoredPrints.com

Morris wrote the text for books which were financed and printed by Fawcett, and were illustrated by Alexander Francis Lydon (1836–1917). Colour printing was a major change from the fine monochrome work of Thomas Bewick (1753–1828). At first wood-engraving illustrations were coloured by hand, but later a system of colouring from multiple wood blocks was used.

Morris' books were mostly published by Groombridge & Sons, of London. His first best-seller was A History of British Birds which was published from June 1850 in monthly parts over a period of some seven years. Each folio consisted of text and four hand-coloured plates. Initially only a thousand copies were printed, but surprising demand quickly forced Fawcett to move to larger premises at East Lodge in Driffield. A Natural History of the Nests and Eggs of British Birds, A History of British Butterflies and A History of British Moths followed in rapid succession. The final work which Fawcett, Morris and Lydon would do together was The County Seats of the Noblemen and Gentlemen of Great Britain and Ireland. This appeared in six volumes, each with 40 coloured plates, and text as usual by Morris. Groombridge & Sons dissolved about 1880, with neither Fawcett nor Morris having profited much financially from their collaboration.

== Personal life ==
In January 1835 he married Anne Sanders, who was the second daughter of Charles Sanders of Bromsgrove, eventually raising a family of 3 sons and 6 daughters. His youngest child, Marmaduke Charles Frederick Morris, was an antiquarian, author and Rector of Nunburnholme after his father.

His sister Cornelia Morris married Abraham Bower, making their son, Frederick Orpen Bower, Morris's nephew, and probably leading Bower to become a botanist.

== Political and personal views ==
From all accounts Morris was irascible by nature, impatient with conservatism and imbued with the spirit of reform – this did not endear him to many people. He was an anti-feminist, loathed fox hunting and any other destruction of wildlife, did not accept the theory of evolution, and had a fervent dislike of Thomas Huxley, whom he saw as an enthusiastic vivisectionist.

=== Views on Darwinism ===
Morris refused to accept the theories on evolution as expounded in Charles Darwin's On the Origin of Species. He was the author of anti-Darwinian pamphlets and rejected common descent and natural selection, which he believed were absurd concepts unsupported by evidence. Morris questioned why proponents of Darwinism were unable to answer such questions as "by what act of natural selection was the pouch of the camel formed" and "how are the electric organs in fishes accounted for by natural selection."

=== Views on animals ===
Morris was an advocate of animal welfare and an opponent of vivisection. In his book Records of Animal Sagacity and Character (1861) he provided "abducent evidence" for the "mental capacities of animals furnished by their actions". He wrote that the Bible did not contradict the idea of animal immortality and argued for the possibility of a "future resurrection or restoration of the animal creation." He authored The Cowardly Cruelty of the Experimenter on Living Animals (1890) and A Defence of Our Dumb Companions (1892), which campaigned against cruelty to animals.

He was an early advocate for conservation, campaigning extensively and ultimately successfully for a nature conservation act. He founded the Plumage League along with Mrs. R. Cavendish-Boyle and Lady Mount Temple in December 1885 with its headquarters at Broadlands, Hampshire. It soon merged into the Selborne League in January 1886 to become the Selborne Society for the Preservation of Birds, Plants and Pleasant Places.

Morris' conservation work was influential in the founding of the Association for the Protection of Sea-Birds.

== Works ==
- 1834 Guide to an Arrangement of British Birds. 20 pp., Longmarts.
- 1850 An Essay on the Eternal Duration of the Earth. 15 pp., London: Groombridge & Sons.
- 1850 An Essay on Scientific Nomenclature. 10 pp., London: Groombridge & Sons.
- 1850–1857. A History of British Birds. 6 volumes., 8vo, London: Groombridge & Sons.
- 1851–53 A Natural History of the Nests and Eggs of British Birds. 3 volumes., Royal 8vo, London: Groombridge & Sons.
- 1853 A History of British Butterflies. Royal 8vo, London: Groombridge & Sons.
- 1856 A Book of Natural History. London: Groombridge & Sons.
- 1856 Bible Natural History. Manchester: J. Ainsworth.
- 1859–70 A History of British Moths. 4 volumes., Royal 8vo, Longmarts.
- 1860 Anecdotes of Natural History. Longroans.
- 1861 Records of Animal Sagacity and Character. London: Longman, Green, Lonman, & Robert.
- 1865 A Catalogue of British Insects in all the Orders. 125 pp., Longmarts.
- 1869 Difficulties of Darwinism.
- 1870 Dogs and their Doings. London: S. W. Partridge & Co.
- 1870 County Seats of The Noblemen and Gentlemen of Great Britain and Ireland. 6 volumes. London: William Mackenzie, online at Internet Archive
- 1875 All the Articles of the Darwin Faith.
- 1877 A Double Dilemma in Darwinism.
- 1880 The Darwin Craze.
- 1886 The Sparrow-Shooter.
- 1890 The Demands of Darwinism on Credulity. London: S. W. Partridge & Co.

== Sources ==
- Armstrong, Patrick (2000). The English Parson-naturalist: A Companionship Between Science and Religion. Gracewing. pp. 74–78. ISBN 978-0-85244-516-7.
- Clark, John F. M. (2004). "Morris, Francis Orpen (1810–1893)". Oxford Dictionary of National Biography (online ed.). Oxford University Press. doi:10.1093/ref:odnb/19304. (Subscription, Wikipedia Library access or UK public library membership required.)
- Kofoid, Charles Atwood (July 1938). "Francis Orpen Morris: Ornithologist and Anti-Darwinist". The Auk. 55 (3): 496–500. doi:10.2307/4078418. JSTOR 4078418.
- Morris, Marmaduke Charles Frederick (1897). Francis Orpen Morris. A Memoir. John C. Nimmo.
- Ross, Frederick (1878). Celebrities of the Yorkshire Wolds. Trübner. pp. 106–108.
