= St Mary's Perivale =

Church in Perivale, London, England

Coordinates: 51.5319°N 0.3229°W

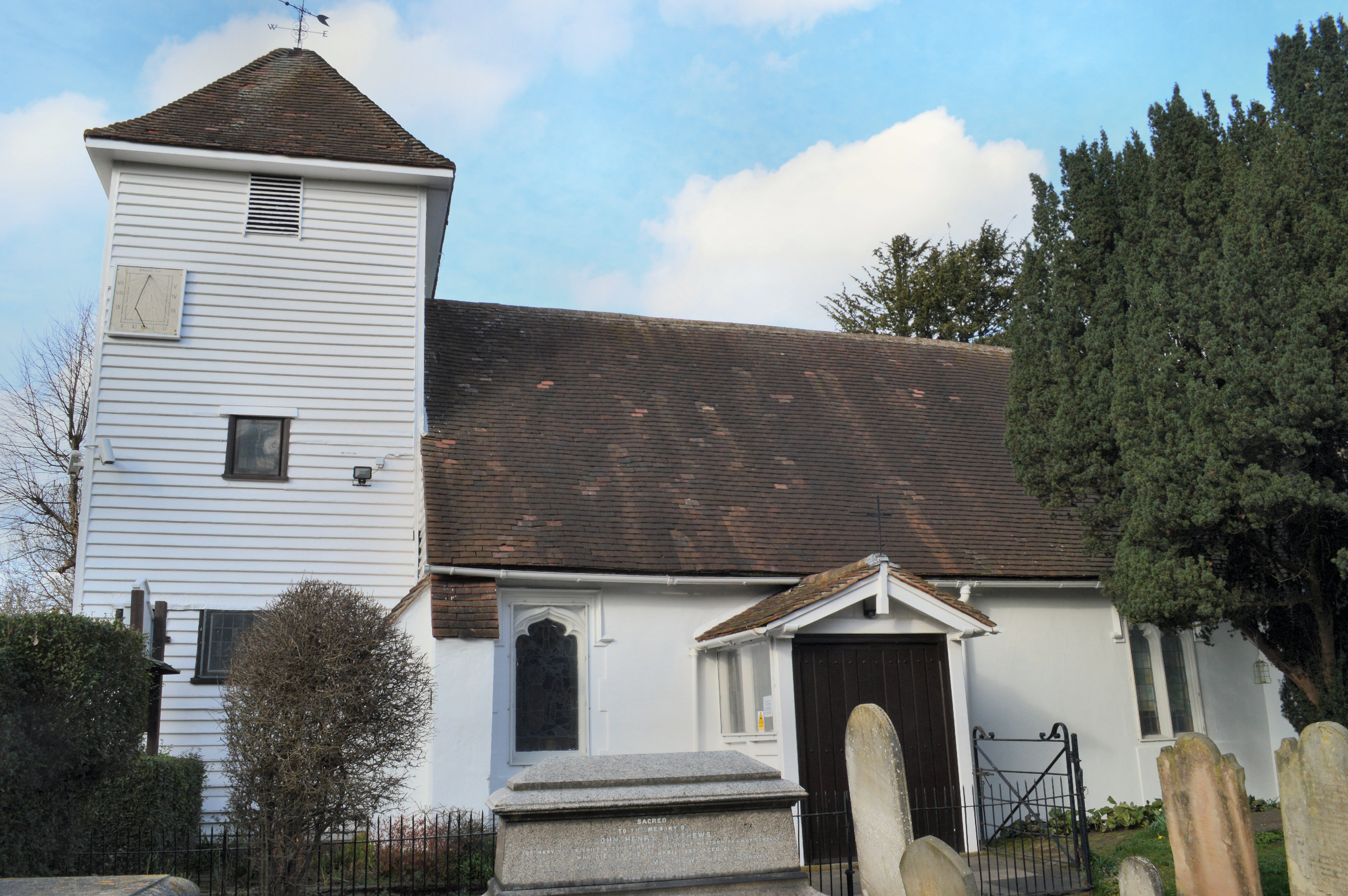
St Mary's Church, Perivale

St Mary's is a 12th- or 13th-century English re-used church building in the London suburb of Perivale. During its religious lifetime, it was dedicated to St Mary, and was the smallest of Anglican churches in the dissolved county of Middlesex, excluding the City of London. It became separated from almost all of its parish's population by the development and heavy traffic on the A40 trunk road, and in 1972, the parish was dissolved and church disbanded. It was adopted by a charitable organisation formed from the local community, the Friends of St Mary, and functions as an arts centre, holding local exhibitions and performances of classical music.

The church is built of rag-stone and flint. Its tower is clad in white weatherboarding. It contains a chime of three bells, all cast in 1949 as a World War II memorial for the war dead of the community and small parish as a whole.

The church was Grade I listed in 1950.

== See also ==
Elthorne Hundred: its parishes map showing the extent of Perivale before it was redistributed among similar old and more modern parishes.
