= Pear Tree Park =

Park in Perivale, London, England

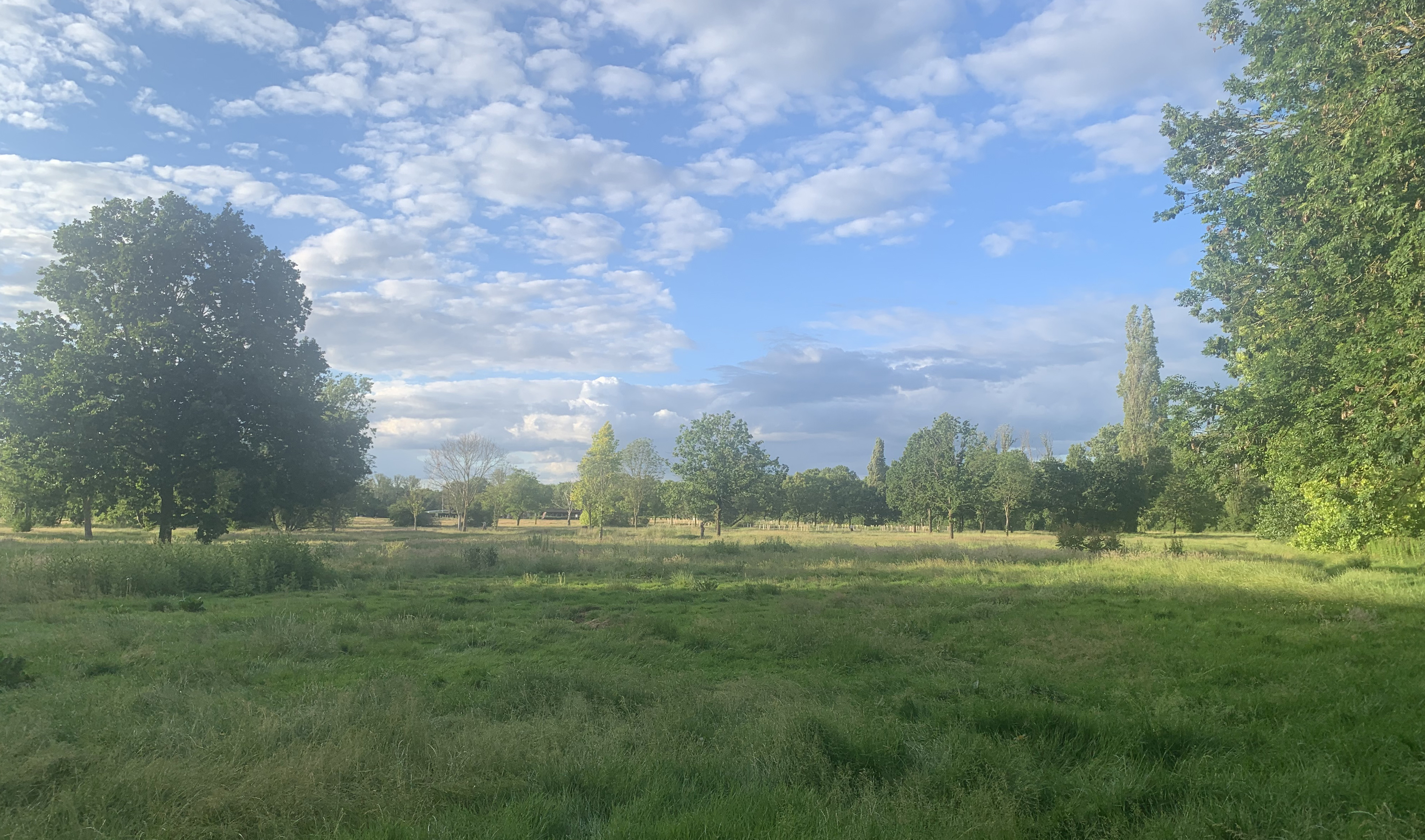
- Pear Tree Park in June 2026
- Interactive map of Pear Tree Park
- Location: Perivale, London, England
- Coordinates: 51.529°N 0.339°W
- Created: July 2024
- Operator: London Borough of Ealing

Pear Tree Park is a public park in the London Borough of Ealing, part of Brent River Park. It was first opened as a public park in July 2024, the land being originally occupied by Perivale Park Golf Course. It is situated adjacent to Perivale Park and Perivale Park Athletics Track. The name was inspired by local children from Brentford Primary School, and reflects the area's past association with pear trees; the name "Perivale" means valley of pear trees. The southern end of Pear Tree Park is bordered by the River Brent.

== History ==
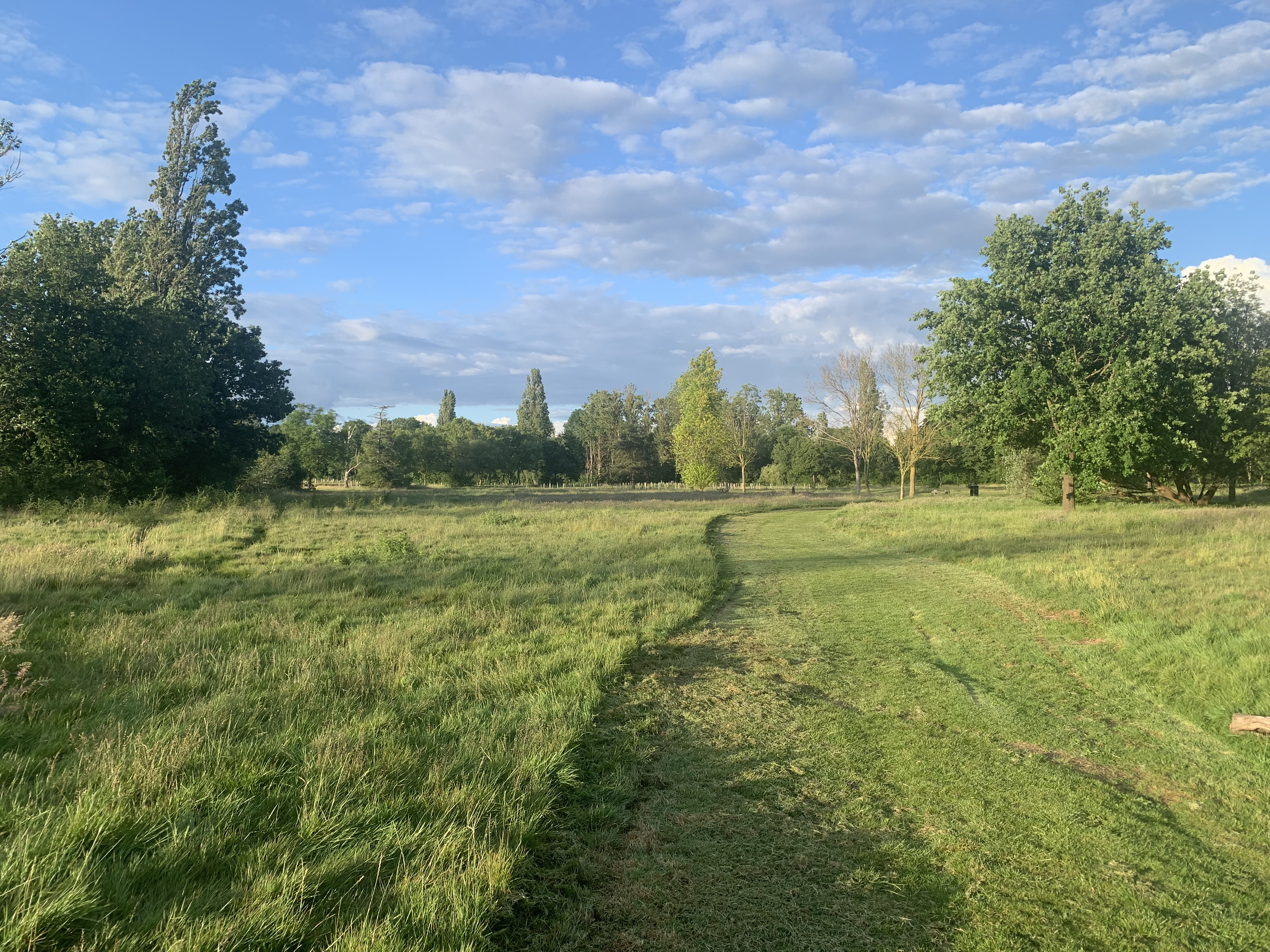
Pear Tree Park June 2026

Pear Tree Park was officially opened to the public in July 2024. The park is about 49 acres in size, and was first developed on the site of Perivale Park Golf Course, which was closed in order to make way for Pear Tree Park. The closure of Perivale Park Golf Course was not without controversy. Local golfers signed petitions protesting the proposed closure, and the National Association of Public and Proprietary Golf Clubs opposed the plans to repurpose the golf course for rewilding. Ealing council however argued that a majority of residents responding to their consultation were in favour.

The name "Pear Tree Park" was inspired by local children from Brentford Primary School and reflects the area's past association with pear trees; hence the name "Perivale", meaning valley of pear trees. As part of the rewilding process, around 5,000 trees were planted in 2025. The park contains a mixture of grass, meadows and wetlands which offer a range of wildlife habitats.

A cafe, the Pear Tree Park Bistro, opened in 2025.

== Gallery ==
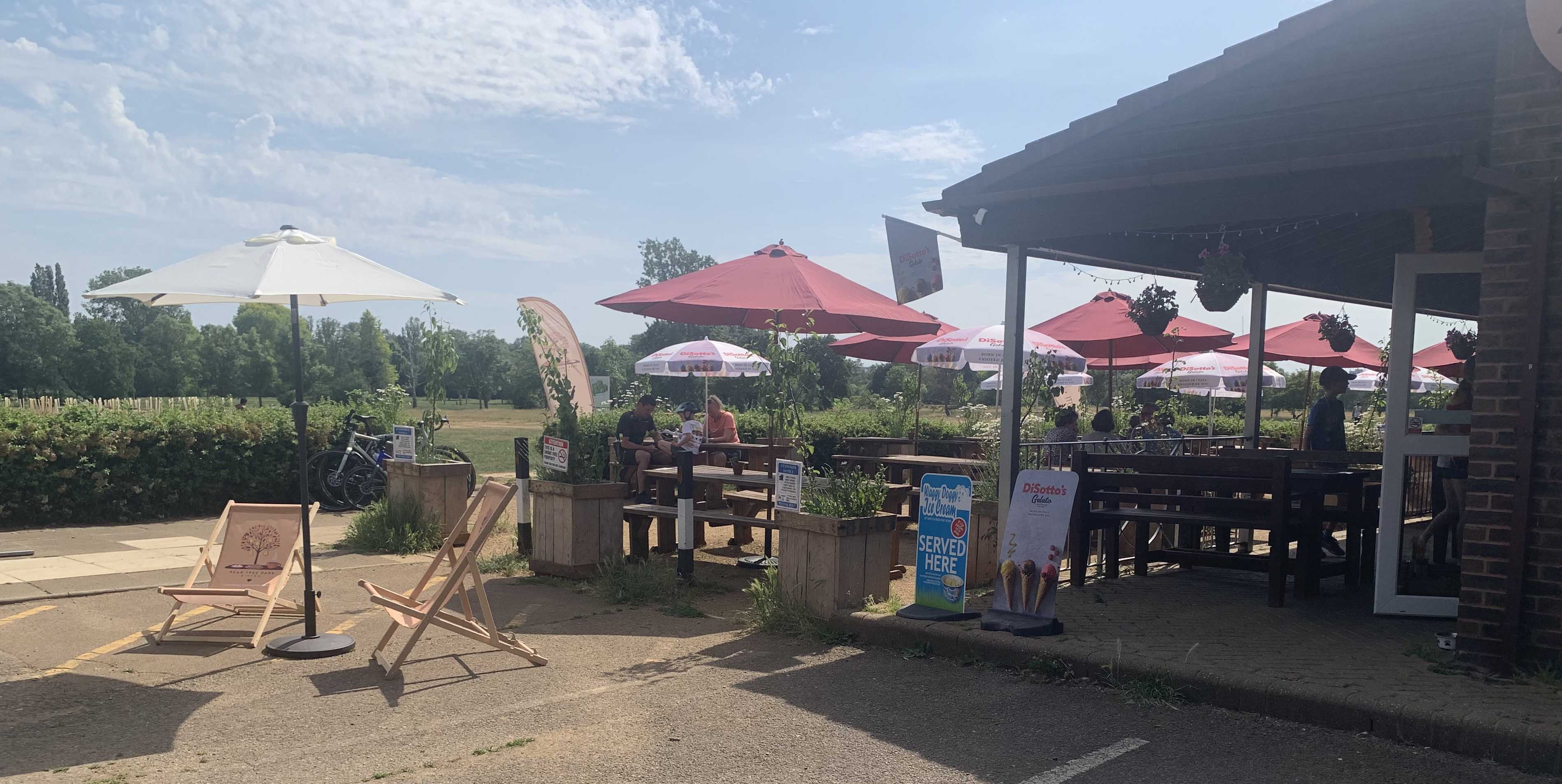
Pear Tree Park Bistro

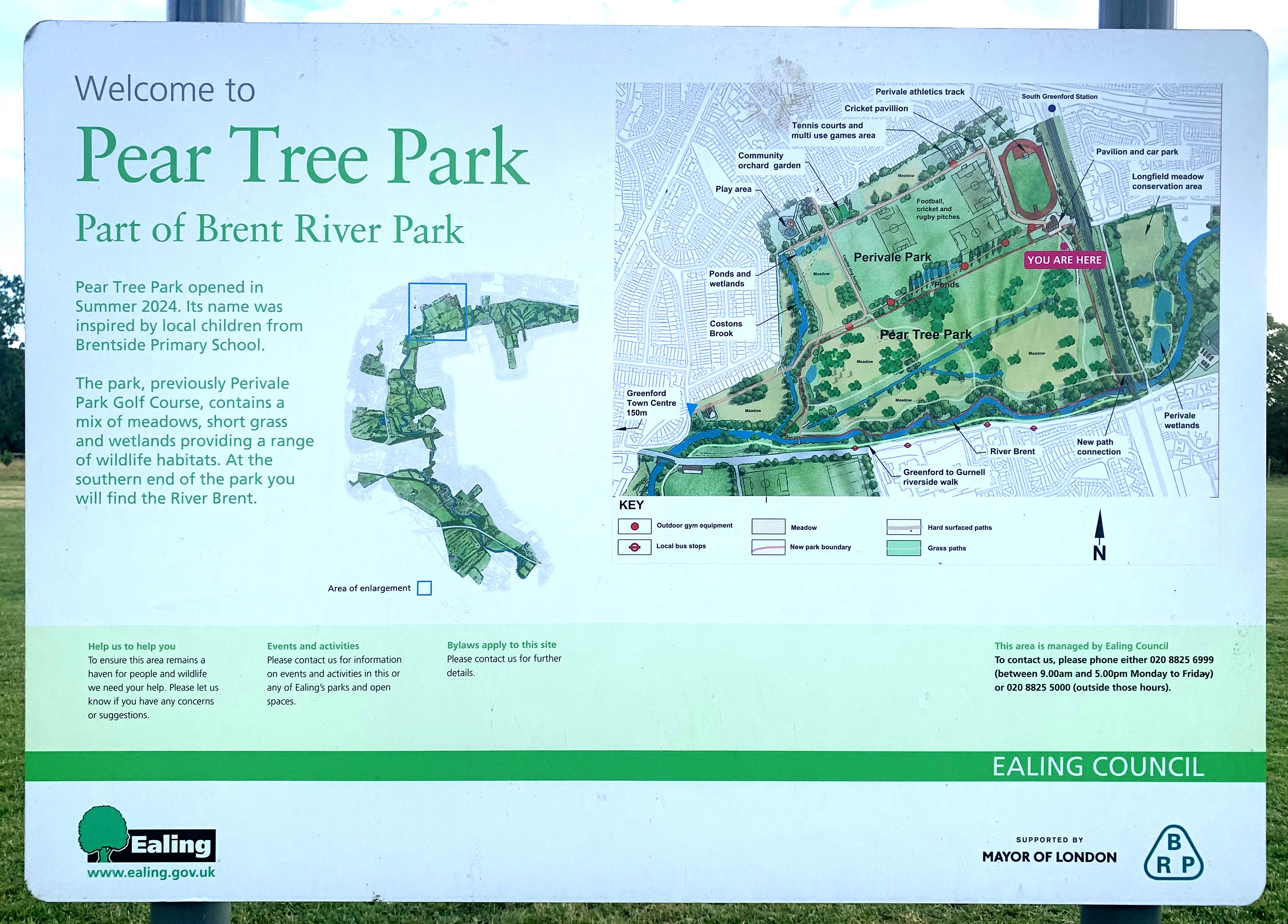
Pear Tree Park Signage

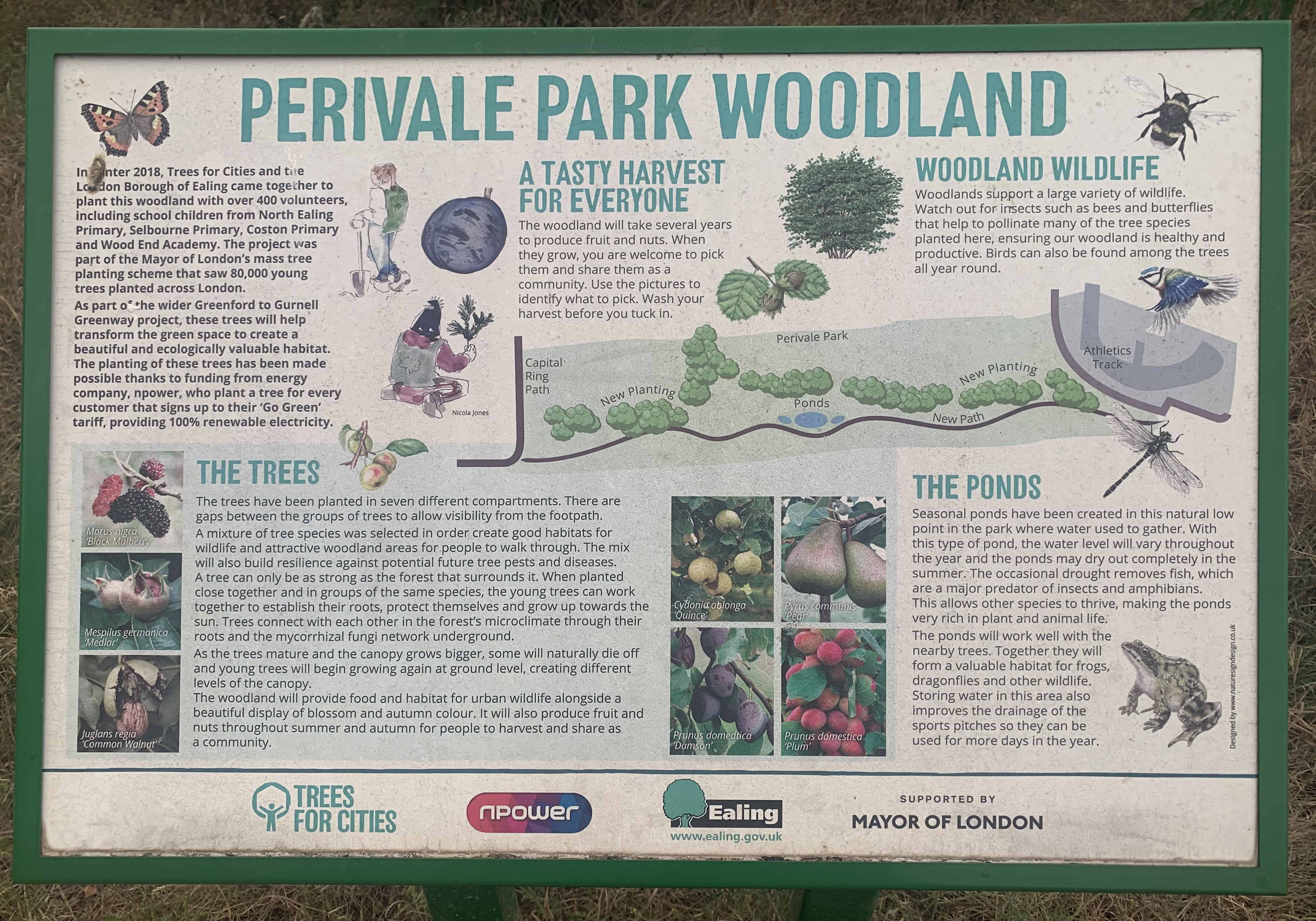
Perivale Park Woodland Signage

== See also ==
- Perivale
- Perivale Park
