= Vera Searle =

British sprinter

Vera Searle (née Palmer)
Personal information
- Born: 25 August 1901 Leytonstone, London, England
- Died: 12 December 1998 (aged 97) Tunbridge Wells, Kent, England

Sport
- Sport: Athletics
- Event: Sprints
- Club: Middlesex Ladies' Athletic Club

Achievements and titles
- Personal bests: 250 m: 35.4 (1923, WR); 250 m: 33.8 (1925, WR)
Medal record
Representing United Kingdom
Women's World Games
Silver medal – second place	1926 Gothenburg	250 metres

Vera Maud Searle OBE (née Palmer; 25 August 1901 – 12 September 1998) was a British sprinter and athletics administrator.

== Biography ==
Palmer was born in Leytonstone, London, on 25 August 1901 to Albert Palmer (1878–1935), assistant secretary of Chelsea Football Club, and Maud Mary Palmer (1879–1946). She was the eldest of four children.

In 1923, she co-founded the Middlesex Ladies Athletics Club, now the Ealing Southall & Middlesex Athletics Club. Later the same year, she participated at the first WAAA Championships taking bronze medal behind Eileen Edwards in the 220 yards. The following year Palmer became the national 440 yards champion at the 1924 WAAA Championships.

Competing as Vera Palmer, she set a world record at 250 metres of 35.4 seconds in 1923 Paris and in 1925, again set a world record at 250 metres of 33.8 seconds at Stamford Bridge. In 1924, she participated at the 1924 Women's Olympiad and won the silver medal in running 250 m and the gold medal in the relay 4 x 220 yards.

Palmer retained her 440 yards title and became the national 220 yards champion after winning the British WAAA Championships title at the 1925 WAAA Championships. The following year in June, she retained both AAA titles at the 1926 WAAA Championships and in August 1926, she won silver (to compatriot Eileen Edwards) in the 250m at the 1926 Women's World Games, held at the Slottsskogsvallen Stadium in Gothenburg, Sweden.

In October 1926, she married Wilfred Edwin Searle, and they had two daughters together: Brenda (born 1928) and Angela (born 1935).

She was honorary secretary of the Women's Amateur Athletic Association (WAAA) from 1930 to 1933, vice-chairman from 1959 to 1973, chairman from 1973 to 1981, and later president until the WAAA merged with the Amateur Athletic Association in 1991. She received the OBE in 1979 for services to athletics.

She died in Tunbridge Wells, Kent, on 12 September 1998.
