= Perivale Wood =

Nature reserve in Perivale, London, England

Coordinates: 51.540°N 0.329°W

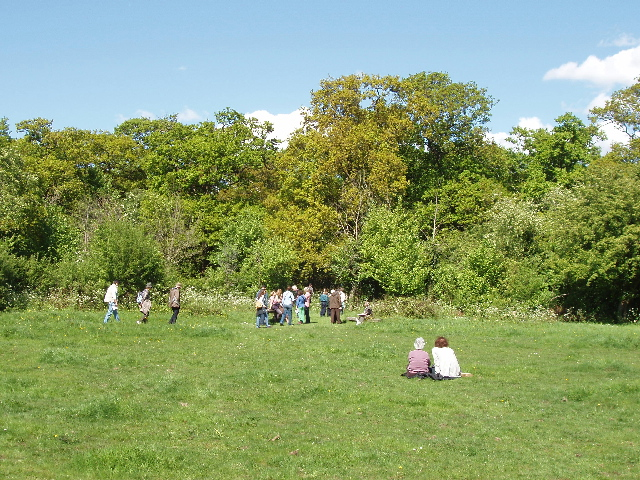
Little Elms Meadow

Perivale Wood is an 11.6 hectare Local Nature Reserve (LNR) and Site of Metropolitan Importance for Nature Conservation in Perivale in the London Borough of Ealing. It is one of the oldest nature reserves in Britain. The Selborne Society has managed it since 1902, at first as a bird sanctuary. In 1914 it leased the site and in 1923 it purchased it. The wood was designated an LNR in 1974.

The site is mainly old oak woodland, with areas of pasture and damp scrub, three ponds and two streams. Plant species include adders tongue fern, and there have been records of 568 species of moths, 17 of mammals and 115 of birds. The Selborne Society was founded in 1885 as a national body to commemorate the work of the naturalist Gilbert White, but is now principally a local body managing Perivale Wood.

The entrance in Sunley Gardens is locked except on the reserve open day on a Sunday in April.
