= Antony Hooper (cricketer) =

English cricketer

Personal information
- Born: 5 September 1967 (age 59); Perivale, West London, England
- Batting: Right-handed
- Bowling: Right-arm medium

Domestic team information
- Years: Team
- 1987–1992: Cambridge University

Career statistics
Competition	First-class	List A
Matches	24	2
Runs scored	848	26
Batting average	21.74	26.00
100s/50s	1/3	–/–
Top score	125	25*
Balls bowled	402	0
Wickets	6	–
Bowling average	45.83	–
5 wickets in innings	–	–
10 wickets in match	–	–
Best bowling	1/5	–
Catches/stumpings	2/–	–/–
- Source: Cricinfo, 2 September 2019

Antony Mark Hooper (born 5 September 1967) is an English former cricketer.

Hooper was born in Perivale in September 1967. He was educated at Latymer Upper School, before going up to St John's College, Cambridge. While studying at Cambridge, he made his debut in first-class cricket for Cambridge University against Middlesex at Fenner's in 1987. He played first-class cricket for Cambridge until 1992, making 23 appearances. Playing primarily as a batsman, he scored 823 runs at an average of 22.24. His highest score of 125, which was his only first-class century, came against Surrey in 1991. Hooper also made a first-class appearance for a combined Oxford and Cambridge Universities cricket team against the touring Pakistanis in 1992. In addition to playing first-class cricket while at Cambridge, he also made two List A one-day appearances for the Combined Universities cricket team in the 1992 Benson & Hedges Cup.
