= Hooper baronets =

Extinct baronetcy in the Baronetage of the United Kingdom

The Hooper baronets, of Tenterden in the County of Kent, was a title in the Baronetage of the United Kingdom. It was created on 11 July 1962 for Frederic Hooper, managing director of the Schweppes Group of Companies and adviser on Recruiting to the Minister of Defence. The title became extinct on the death of the second Baronet in 1987.

== Hooper baronets, of Tenterden (1962) ==
- Sir Frederic Collins Hooper, 1st Baronet (1892–1963)
- Sir Anthony Robin Maurice Hooper, 2nd Baronet (1918–1987)
