= Georgina Cowper-Temple, Baroness Mount Temple =

English religious enthusiast

The Right Honourable The Lady Mount Temple
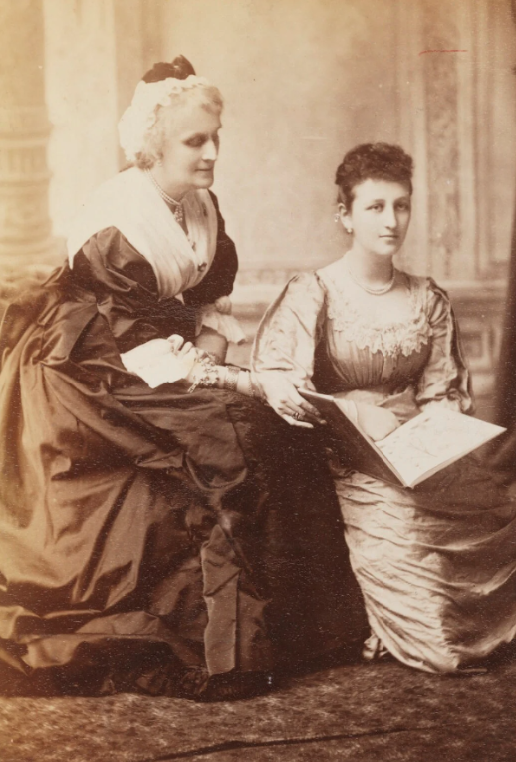
- Lady Mount Temple and her adopted daughter Juliet in 1887

Personal details
- Born: Georgina Elizabeth Tollemache; 1822
- Died: 17 October 1901 (aged 78–79)
- Spouse: William Cowper-Temple, 1st Baron Mount Temple (m. 1848; died 1888)
- Children: 1
- Parent(s): John Richard Delap Tollemache; Lady Elizabeth Stratford

Georgina Elizabeth Cowper-Temple, Baroness Mount Temple (née Tollemache; 1822 – 17 October 1901) was an English religious enthusiast, humanitarian, and animal welfare campaigner. She was the second wife of William Cowper-Temple, 1st Baron Mount Temple. Lady Mount Temple was active in the Temperance Movement and the Royal Society for the Prevention of Cruelty to Animals and was a co-founder of the Plumage League.

== Early life and family ==
Lady Mount Temple was born Georgina Elizabeth Tollemache on 8 November to Admiral John Richard Delap Tollemache and Lady Elizabeth Stratford. One source says she was probably born in 1821. Her father, whose original surname was Halliday, assumed by royal license the surname and arms of his mother, Lady Jane Tollemache, who was the daughter and co-heiress of Lionel Tollemache, 4th Earl of Dysart. Her mother was the daughter of John Stratford, 3rd Earl of Aldborough. She was the sister of John Tollemache, 1st Baron Tollemache. Mount Temple was a close friend and distant cousin of Constance Lloyd, the wife of Oscar Wilde.

== Humanitarianism and animal welfare ==
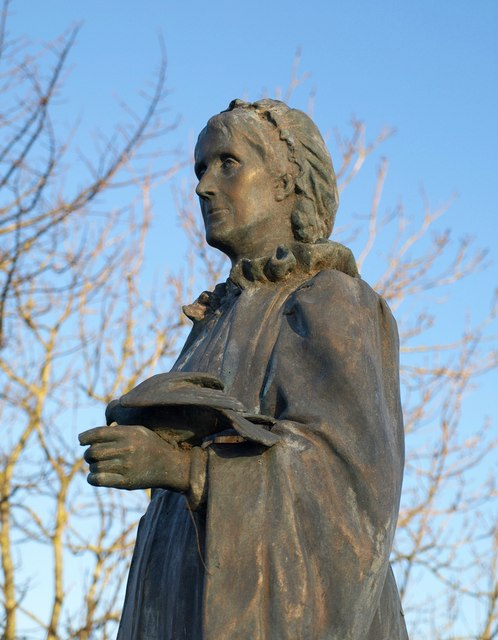
Bronze statue of Lady Mount Temple in Babbacombe

Mount Temple was one of the leaders of the Torquay Anti-Vivisection Society. She also co-founded the Plumage League.

She was active in the Band of Mercy, whose first president was her husband, and the Royal Society for the Prevention of Cruelty to Animals. Mount Temple was also involved in the Temperance Movement.

In 1903, a birdbath with a bronze statue of Mount Temple, designed by Arthur George Walker, was erected in Babbacombe. A horse trough near the Torre railway station is also dedicated to her.

Mount Temple became a vegetarian in 1876 and a vice-president of the Vegetarian Society in 1884.

== Personal life ==
On 22 November 1848, she married William Cowper-Temple, the second son of Peter Cowper, 5th Earl Cowper. She and her husband had no natural children, but adopted a daughter named Juliet Latour Temple, in 1869. In 1880, her husband was elevated to the peerage as Baron Mount Temple.

Lady Mount Temple was a friend of the writer John Ruskin, the writer George MacDonald, the poet Dante Gabriel Rossetti, and the suffragist Frances Power Cobbe.

She lived at Babbacombe Cliff and also owned properties in Ireland. She died in 1901. After her death, part of her estate was bequeathed to the Church Army and to the Victoria Street Society of Protection of Animals from Vivisection.
