= 2011 British Athletics Championships =

- Dates: 29–31 July
- Host city: Birmingham, England
- Venue: Alexander Stadium
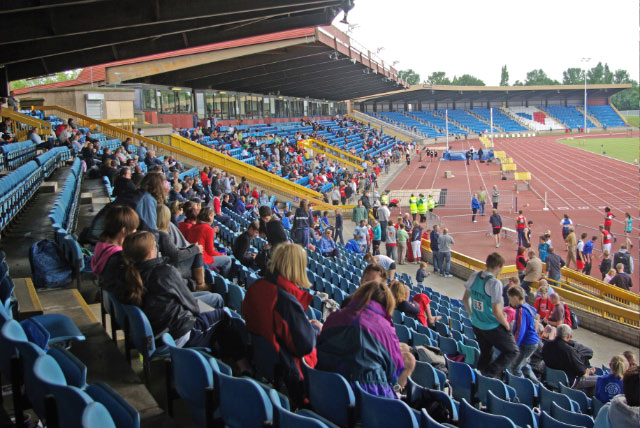
- Level: Senior
- Type: Outdoor

The 2011 British Athletics Championships was the national championship in outdoor track and field for athletes in the United Kingdom, held from 29–31 July at Alexander Stadium in Birmingham. It was organised by UK Athletics. It served as a selection meeting for Great Britain at the 2011 World Championships in Athletics.

The best British finisher in the men's 10,000 metres was James Walsh in sixth place with a time of 28:37.30 minutes.

== Medal summary ==
=== Men ===
Event	Gold		Silver		Bronze	
100m (Wind: +1.2 m/s)	Dwain Chambers	10.09	Harry Aikines-Aryeetey	10.14	Marlon Devonish	10.14
200m (Wind: -1.6 m/s)	Christian Malcolm	20.85	James Ellington	20.91	Luke Fagan	21.00
400m	Martyn Rooney	45.44	Chris Clarke	45.61	(Wales) Dai Greene	45.82
800m	Andrew Osagie	1:46.84	Michael Rimmer	1:47.64	(Wales) Gareth Warburton	1:48.13
1,500m	James Shane	3:36.22	Andy Baddeley	3:39.44	Nick McCormick	3:41.66
5,000m	Mo Farah	14:00.72	Andy Vernon	14:01.72	Jonathan Mellor	14:04.11
10,000 metres	(Mexico) Juan Luis Barrios	27:38.12	(Japan) Tetsuya Yoroizaka	27:44.30	(Italy) Daniele Meucci	27:44.50
110m hurdles (Wind: -0.8 m/s)	Lawrence Clarke	13.58	Gianni Frankis	13.59	William Sharman	13.77
400m hurdles	Nathan Woodward	49.66	Richard Davenport	49.76	Richard Yates	50.01
3000m s'chase	Luke Gunn	8:40.16	James Wilkinson	8:42.86	Mark Draper	8:42.89
5000m walk	Tom Bosworth	19:29.87	Daniel King	21:10.10	Thomas Taylor	23:22.30
high jump	Tom Parsons	2.28 m	Martyn Bernard	2.28 m	Robbie Grabarz	2.28 m
pole vault	Steven Lewis	5.50 m	Nick Cruchley	5.35 m	Max Eaves	5.20 m
long jump	Julian Reid	8.06 m (+0.8 m/s)	JJ Jegede	8.04 m (+2.0 m/s)	Dan Bramble	7.65 m (-0.3 m/s)
triple jump	Larry Achike	16.83 m (+0.6 m/s)	Julian Reid	16.53 m (+0.2 m/s)	Ade Babatunde	15.94 m (+1.5 m/s)
shot put	Carl Myerscough	18.57 m	Scott Rider	18.12 m	Greg Beard	17.64 m
discus throw	Abdul Buhari	63.32 m	Carl Myerscough	61.63 m	Brett Morse	61.57 m
hammer throw	Alex Smith	73.26 m	Mike Floyd	70.85 m	(Scotland) Mark Dry	70.33 m
javelin throw	Lee Doran	78.63 m	Mervyn Luckwell	75.06 m	(Scotland) James Campbell	74.63 m

=== Women ===
Event	Gold		Silver		Bronze	
100m (Wind: +0.8 m/s)	Jeanette Kwakye	11.23	Anyika Onuora	11.36	Laura Turner-Alleyne	11.39
200m (Wind: -0.8 m/s)	Anyika Onuora	23.26	Abi Oyepitan	23.57	Margaret Adeoye	23.59
400m	Perri Shakes-Drayton	51.52	Shana Cox	51.84	Christine Ohuruogu	51.91
800m	Jenny Meadows	2:02.28	Emma Jackson	2:02.48	Marilyn Okoro	2:03.55
1,500m	Hannah England	4:07.05	Lisa Dobriskey	4:07.23	Barbara Parker	4:12.19
5,000m	Julia Bleasdale	15:49.02	(Scotland) Eilish McColgan	15:52.69	(Scotland) Beth Potter	15:56.65
10,000m	(Ethiopia) Werknesh Kidane	31:08.92	(Japan) Yuko Shimizu	33:46.12	Sonia Samuels	33:50.72
100m hurdles (Wind: +0.8 m/s)	Tiffany Porter	12.76	Jessica Ennis-Hill	12.96	Gemma Bennett	13.19
400m hurdles	Perri Shakes-Drayton	55.52	(Scotland) Eilidh Doyle	56.48	Meghan Beesley	57.52
3000m s'chase	(Scotland) Lennie Waite	10:03.18	(Scotland) Emma Raven	10:24.24	(Scotland) Sara Hood	10:43.10
5000m walk	Johanna Jackson	21:42.32	Heather Lewis	24:59.66	Tasha Webster	26:57.99
high jump	Jessica Ennis-Hill	1.89 m	Emma Perkins	1.83 m	(Scotland) Emma Nuttall	1.77 m
pole vault	Holly Bradshaw	4.56 m	Kate Dennison	4.40 m	Bryony Raine	4.11 m
long jump	Shara Proctor	6.65 m (+0.3 m/s)	Lorraine Ugen	6.54 m (+0.7 m/s)	Jessica Ennis-Hill	6.44 m (-0.1 m/s)
triple jump	Laura Samuel	13.67 m (+0.8 m/s)	Yasmine Regis	13.61 m (+1.2 m/s)	Nadia Williams	13.37 m (-0.3 m/s)
shot put	Eden Francis	16.73 m	Rebecca Peake	15.75 m	Rachel Wallader	15.34 m
discus throw	Jade Lally	56.19 m	Eden Francis	53.99 m	(Scotland) Kirsty Law	51.20 m
hammer throw	Sophie Hitchon	67.69 m	Sarah Holt	65.63 m	Carys Parry	63.86 m
javelin throw	Goldie Sayers	60.57 m	Katy Temple	51.68 m	Lianne Clarke	49.77 m
