= 2004 AAA Championships =

British athletics event

- Dates: 10–11 July
- Host city: Manchester, England
- Venue: Manchester Regional Arena
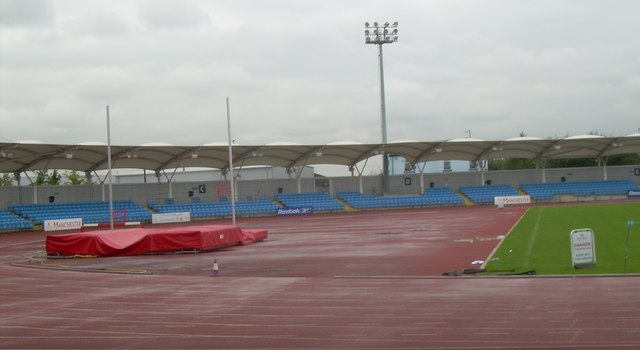
- Level: Senior
- Type: Outdoor

The 2004 AAA Championships was an outdoor track and field competition organised by the Amateur Athletic Association (AAA), held from 10 to 11 July at the Manchester Regional Arena in Manchester, England. It was considered the de facto national championships for the United Kingdom. and was the Olympic trials event for the 2004 Summer Olympics.

== Medal summary ==
=== Men ===
Event	Gold		Silver		Bronze	
100m	Jason Gardener	10.22	Darren Campbell	10.23	Mark Lewis-Francis	10.24
200m	Chris Lambert	20.94	(Wales) Christian Malcolm	21.09	Dwayne Grant	21.27
400m	(Wales) Tim Benjamin	45.58	Daniel Caines	45.88	Sean Baldock	46.24
800m	Sam Ellis	1:49.19	Ricky Soos	1:49.42	Joel Kidger	1:49.44
1,500m	Chris Mulvaney	3:50.14	Andrew Baddeley	3:50.40	Michael Skinner	3:50.77
5,000m	Chris Thompson	13:42.10	Spencer Barden	13:51.41	Chris Davies	13:52.78
10,000m	Matt O'Dowd	29:05.08	Kassa Tadesse	29:22.20	Mark Miles	29:27.05
110m hurdles	Robert Newton	13.72	(Wales) Paul Gray	13.88	William Sharman	13.97
400m hurdles	Chris Rawlinson	50.04	Dale Garland	51.16	Robert Lewis	51.39
3000m steeplechase	(Wales) Justin Chaston	8:33.69	Jermaine Mays	8:39.44	(Scotland) Kevin Sheppard	8:40.31
5000m walk	Dominic King	20:11.35	Daniel King	20:47.19	Steve Hollier	21:02.39
high jump	Ben Challenger	2.23 m	Dalton Grant	2.15 m	Samson Oni	2.15 m
pole vault	(Wales) Tim Thomas	5.45 m	(Wales) Scott Simpson	5.15 m	Christian North	5.15 m
long jump	Chris Tomlinson	7.84 m	(Scotland) Darren Ritchie	7.76 m	Nathan Morgan	7.71 m
triple jump	Nathan Douglas	16.95 m	Tosin Oke	16.49 m	(Wales) Steven Shalders	16.41 m
shot put	Carl Myerscough	20.84 m	Marcus Gouldbourne	17.20 m	(Scotland) Neil Elliott	16.49 m
discus throw	Emeka Udechuku	61.60 m	Carl Myerscough	61.54 m	(Scotland) Scot Thompson	52.65 m
hammer throw	Mick Jones	72.04 m	Andy Frost	69.94 m	Mike Floyd	68.05 m
javelin throw	Steve Backley	81.25 m	Nick Nieland	79.06 m	Mick Hill	79.00 m
decathlon	Louis Evling-Jones	7405 pts w	Ben Hazell	7176 pts w	Adrian Hemery	6937 pts

=== Women ===
Event	Gold		Silver		Bronze	
100m	Abi Oyepitan	11.54	Joice Maduaka	11.56	Emma Ania	11.65
200m	Joice Maduaka	23.16	Abi Oyepitan	23.23	(Scotland) Susan Deacon	23.76
400m	Christine Ohuruogu	50.98	(Scotland) Lee McConnell	51.29	Helen Karagounis	52.38
800m	Kelly Holmes	1:59.39	Jo Fenn	2:01.28	(Scotland) Susan Scott	2:02.13
1,500m	(Wales) Hayley Tullett	4:07.24	Lisa Dobriskey	4:08.14	Helen Clitheroe	4:08.18
5,000m	Catherine Berry	15:45.28	(Ethiopia) Getenesh Tamirat	15:45.82	(Scotland) Collette Fagan	15:49.51
10,000m	(Scotland) Kathy Butler	31:36.90	Hayley Yelling	31:45.14	(Australia) Natalie Harvey	32:14.01
100m hurdles	Sarah Claxton	13.21	Diane Allahgreen	13.38	Rachel King	13.39
400m hurdles	Katie Jones	58.26	Nicola Sanders	58.63	Sian Scott	59.97
3000m steeplechase	Tina Brown	10:13.19	Jo Ankier	10:15.94	Sonia Thomas	10:16.28
5000m walk	Niobe Menéndez	23:53.75	Sophie Hales	24:37.37	Rebecca Mersh	24:44.31
high jump	Susan Jones	1.89 m	(Wales) Julie Crane	1.82 m	Julia Bennett	1.78 m
pole vault	(Northern Ireland) Zoe Brown	4.15 m	Liz Hughes	3.95 m	(Scotland) Kirsty Maguire	3.95 m
long jump	Jade Johnson	6.72 m	Kelly Sotherton	6.61 m	Kate Brewington	6.12 m
triple jump	Michelle Griffith	13.43 m	Nadia Williams	12.74 m	Rebecca White	12.71 m
shot put	Julie Dunkley	16.03 m	(Northern Ireland) Eva Massey	15.99 m	Ade Oshinowo	15.78 m
discus throw	(Wales) Philippa Roles	58.57 m	Shelley Newman	55.44 m	Kara Nwidobie	52.78 m
hammer throw	Lorraine Shaw	68.11 m	(Scotland) Shirley Webb	64.67 m	Liz Pidgeon	60.82 m
javelin throw	Goldie Sayers	60.85 m	Kelly Morgan	58.98 m	Shelley Holroyd	57.48 m
heptathlon	Caroline Pearce	5253 pts	Wendy Davidson	5093 pts w	Jenny Pacey	4805 pts
