= 2013 British Athletics Championships =

- Dates: 12–14 July
- Host city: Birmingham, England
- Venue: Alexander Stadium
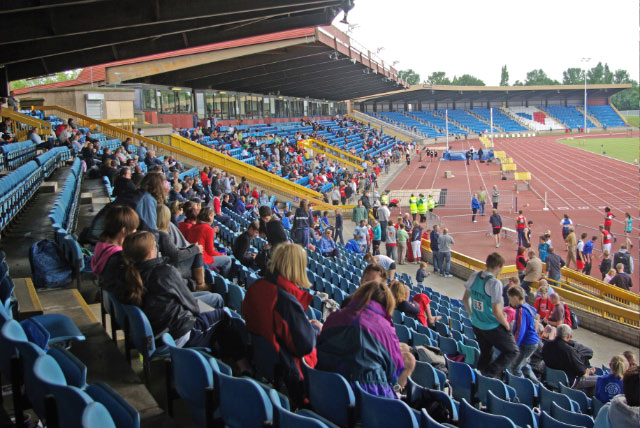
- Level: Senior
- Type: Outdoor

The 2013 British Athletics Championships was the national championship in outdoor track and field for athletes in the United Kingdom, held from 12–14 July at Alexander Stadium in Birmingham. It was organised by UK Athletics. It served as a selection meeting for the 2013 World Championships in Athletics.

== Medal summary ==
=== Men ===
event	Gold		Silver		Bronze	
100m (Wind: +1.9 m/s)	Dwain Chambers	10.04	Harry Aikines-Aryeetey	10.08	Andrew Robertson	10.14
200ms (Wind: +2.4 m/s)	James Ellington	20.45	Richard Kilty	20.50	Delano Williams	20.58
400m	Nigel Levine	45.23	Conrad Williams	45.59	Michael Bingham	45.69
800m	Michael Rimmer	1:47.79	Mukhtar Mohammed	1:47.86	(Wales) Gareth Warburton	1:48.89
1,500m	(Scotland) Chris O'Hare	3:51.36	James Brewer	3:51.92	Lee Emanuel	3:52.34
5,000m	Andy Vernon	13:43.17	Nick McCormick	13:59.52	Jonathan Mellor	14:00.76
10,000 metres	(Scotland) Andrew Lemoncello	29:28.72	Keith Gerrard	29:29.47	Scott Overall	29:29.57
110m hurdles (Wind: 0.0 m/s)	William Sharman	13.44	Gianni Frankis	13.60	Nick Gayle	13.80
400m hurdles	(Wales) Dai Greene	48.66	(Wales) Rhys Williams	48.85	Richard Yates	49.49
3000m s'chase	James Wilkinson	8:42.45	Luke Gunn	8:45.44	Mark Draper	8:45.67
5000m walk	Alex Wright	19:27.39 NR	Tom Bosworth	19:38.62	Jamie Higgins	20:57.15
high jump	Robbie Grabarz	2.28 m	Tom Parsons	2.25 m	(Scotland) David Smith	2.19 m
pole vault	Luke Cutts	5.65 m	Steven Lewis	5.65 m	Max Eaves	5.35 m
long jump	Chris Tomlinson	8.03 m (-1.4 m/s)	Dan Bramble	7.91 m (0.0 m/s)	JJ Jegede	7.78 m (-0.6 m/s)
triple jump	Julian Reid	16.79 m (+1.1 m/s)	Nathan Douglas	16.74 m (+1.9 m/s)	Nathan Fox	16.22 m (+0.7 m/s)
shot put	Greg Beard	18.29 m	Ryan Spencer Jones	17.45 m	Jamie Williamson	16.19 m
discus throw	(Wales) Brett Morse	62.05 m	Tom Norman	54.28 m	Chris Scott	53.76 m
hammer throw	(Scotland) Andrew Frost	72.28 m	James Bedford	70.56 m	Alex Smith	70.08 m
javelin throw	Lee Doran	70.77 m	Bonne Buwembo	69.73 m	Joe Dunderdale	68.35 m

=== Women ===
event	Gold		Silver		Bronze	
100m (Wind: -0.2 m/s)	Asha Philip	11.20	Annabelle Lewis	11.43	Desirèe Henry	11.51
200m (Wind: +2.5 m/s)	Anyika Onuora	22.71	Asha Philip	23.07	Louise Bloor	23.65
400m	Christine Ohuruogu	50.98	Shana Cox	51.76	Margaret Adeoye	51.93
800m	Marilyn Okoro	2:00.60	Jessica Judd	2:02.81	Shelayna Oskan-Clarke	2:03.59
1,500m	Hannah England	4:10.99	Emma Jackson	4:13.17	Montana Jones	4:14.19
5,000m	(Scotland) Stephanie Twell	15:55.01	(Scotland) Laura Whittle	16:00.50	Katie Brough	16:09.83
100m hurdles (Wind: +0.6 m/s)	Tiffany Porter	12.68	Serita Solomon	13.18	Louise Wood	13.60
400m hurdles	Perri Shakes-Drayton	54.36	(Scotland) Eilidh Child	54.90	Meghan Beesley	55.39
3000m s'chase	(Scotland) Eilish McColgan	9:56.02	(Scotland) Emily Stewart	10:02.09	(Scotland) Lennie Waite	10:04.97
5000m walk	(Wales) Bethan Davies	23:21.08	Heather Lewis	23:50.59	Ellie Dooley	24:04.21
high jump	(Scotland) Emma Nuttall	1.87 m	Jordanna Morrish	1.77 m	Adele Lassu	1.74 m
pole vault	Sally Peake	4.23 m	Sally Scott	3.80 m	Olivia Curran	3.80 m
long jump	Shara Proctor	6.84 m (+1.7 m/s)	Jazmin Sawyers	6.50 m (-0.2 m/s)	Dominique Blaize	6.47 m (+0.3 m/s)
triple jump	Laura Samuel	13.75 m (+2.1 m/s)	Chioma Matthews	13.38 m (+1.4 m/s)	Sineade Gutzmore	13.09 m (0.0 m/s)
shot put	Rachel Wallader	15.96 m	Shaunagh Brown	15.76 m	(Scotland) Kirsty Yates	14.27 m
discus throw	Jade Lally	60.23 m	(Scotland) Kirsty Law	52.75 m	Samantha Milner	47.38 m
hammer throw	Shaunagh Brown	62.71 m	Carys Parry	62.33 m	(Scotland) Susan McKelvie	60.92 m
javelin throw	Rosie Semenytsh	49.76 m	Katy Watts	48.99 m	Eloise Meakins	46.39 m
