= 2007 British Athletics Championships =

- Dates: 27–29 July
- Host city: Manchester, Great Britain
- Venue: Manchester Regional Arena
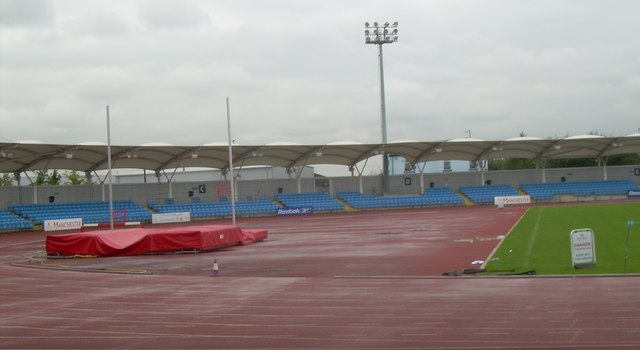
- Level: Senior
- Type: Outdoor

The 2007 British Athletics Championships was the national championship in outdoor track and field for athletes in the United Kingdom, held from 27 to 29 July at Manchester Regional Arena in Manchester. It was first time that the event was organised by UK Athletics and it incorporated the AAA Championships (the principal national competition organised separately by the Amateur Athletic Association of England until 2006). The national championships served as a selection meeting for Great Britain at the 2007 World Championships in Athletics.

== Results ==
=== Men ===
Event	Gold		Silver		Bronze	
100m (Wind: -2.0 m/s)	Marlon Devonish	10.31	Craig Pickering	10.32	Mark Lewis-Francis	10.39
200m (Wind: -0.7 m/s)	Marlon Devonish	20.79	Alexander Nelson	20.84	Luke Fagan	20.86
400m	Andrew Steele	45.70	Martyn Rooney	45.93	Richard Buck	46.28
800m	Michael Rimmer	1:47.06	Richard Hill	1:47.78	James Brewer	1:47.80
1,500m	Andy Baddeley	3:43.25	Stephen Davies	3:45.29	Tom Lancashire	3:45.64
5,000m	Mo Farah	13:40.19	Michael Skinner	13:54.35	Antony Ford	13:56.61
110m hurdles (Wind: -0.3 m/s)	Andy Turner	13.54	(Scotland) Allan Scott	13.78	William Sharman	13.98
400m hurdles	Dale Garland	49.79	Steven Green	50.17	(Scotland) Francis Smith	51.02
3000m s'chase	(Scotland) Andrew Lemoncello	8:42.57	Jermaine Mays	8:46.65	Luke Gunn	8:48.86
5000m walk	Dominic King	20:57.90	Ben Wears	22:11.85	Peter Kaneen	22:55.00
high jump	Martyn Bernard	2.24 m	Germaine Mason	2.18 m	Tom Parsons	2.18 m
pole vault	Steven Lewis	5.61 m	Luke Cutts	5.30 m	Nick Buckfield	5.20 m
long jump	Chris Tomlinson	7.99 m (+0.0)	Nathan Morgan	7.89 m (+0.9)	Jonathan Moore	7.58 m (+0.2)
triple jump	Tosin Oke	16.59 m (+1.2)	Julian Golley	16.13 m (+0.5)	Mike McKernan	16.06 m (+0.3)
shot put	Carl Myerscough	19.39 m	Emeka Udechuku	17.87 m	Kieren Kelly	17.09 m
discus throw	Emeka Udechuku	60.83 m	Abdul Buhari	56.87 m	Matthew Brown	53.41 m
hammer throw	Andy Frost	71.02 m	Mike Floyd	67.16 m	Simon Bown	66.82 m
javelin throw	Nick Nieland	73.95 m	Neil McLellan	73.62 m	Mervyn Luckwell	72.05 m

=== Women ===
Event	Gold		Silver		Bronze	
100m (Wind: -2.6 m/s)	Jeanette Kwakye	11.59	Laura Turner-Alleyne	11.59	Joice Maduaka	11.68
200m (Wind: -2.4 m/s)	Jeanette Kwakye	23.66	Emily Freeman	23.78	Donna Fraser	24.07
400m	Nicola Sanders	51.33	Donna Fraser	52.65	Vicki Barr	52.85
800m	Jemma Simpson	2:00.91	Marilyn Okoro	2:01.53	Jenny Meadows	2:01.72
1,500m	Katrina Wootton	4:09.57	Charlene Thomas	4:10.83	(Scotland) Stephanie Twell	4:12.64
5,000m	Jo Pavey	15:17.77	Sophie Lovell	16:14.57	Jo Wilkinson	16:18.76
100m hurdles (Wind: -2.7 m/s)	Jessica Ennis-Hill	13.25	Sarah Claxton	13.31	Gemma Bennett	13.44
400m hurdles	Tasha Danvers	55.43	(Scotland) Lee McConnell	56.91	(Scotland) Eilidh Doyle	57.15
3000m s'chase	Helen Clitheroe	9:47.49	Jo Ankier	10:08.53	Claire Entwistle	10:13.83
5000m walk	Johanna Jackson	22:03.65	Sophie Hales	25:01.21	Estle van Schalkwyk	25:03.84
high jump	Jessica Ennis-Hill	1.87 m	Kelly Sotherton	1.80 m	Stephanie Pywell	1.80 m
pole vault	Kate Dennison	4.20 m	Fiona Harrison	4.10 m	Louise Butterworth	3.95 m
long jump	Kelly Sotherton	6.53 m (+0.8)	Jade Johnson	6.51 m (+1.8)	Julie Dodoo	6.29 m (+0.6)
triple jump	Nadia Williams	13.58 m (+0.5)	Becky Brennan	13.17 m (+0.7)	(Scotland) Gillian Kerr	12.88 m (+0.0)
shot put	(Northern Ireland) Eva Massey	16.63 m	Joanne Duncan	15.92 m	Eden Francis	15.52 m
discus throw	(Wales) Philippa Roles	57.83 m	Emma Carpenter	54.40 m	Eden Francis	54.08 m
hammer throw	Zoe Derham	64.99 m	(Scotland) Shirley Webb	63.46 m	Laura Douglas	61.88 m
javelin throw	Goldie Sayers	63.02 m	Laura Whittingham	52.88 m	Lianne Clarke	52.42 m
