= 2012 British Athletics Championships =

- Dates: 22–24 June
- Host city: Birmingham, England
- Venue: Alexander Stadium
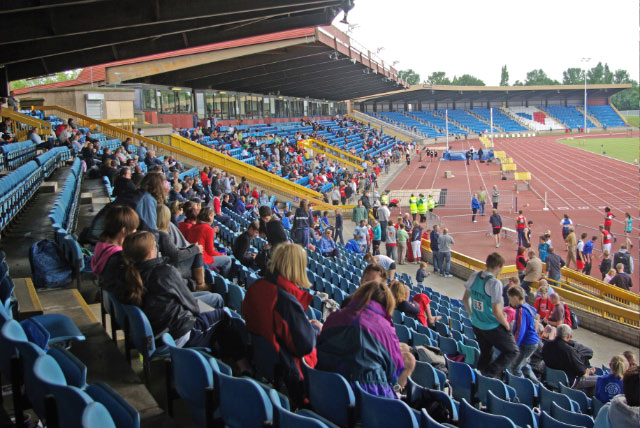
- Level: Senior
- Type: Outdoor

The 2012 British Athletics Championships was the national championship in outdoor track and field for athletes in the United Kingdom, held from 22–24 June at Alexander Stadium in Birmingham. It was organised by UK Athletics. It served as a selection meeting for Great Britain at the 2012 Summer Olympics.

Michael Skinner was the highest placed British athlete in eighth place in a time of 29:40.78.

== Medal summary ==
=== Men ===
Event	Gold		Silver		Bronze	
100m (Wind: -0.1 m/s)	Dwain Chambers	10.25	Adam Gemili	10.29	James Dasaolu	10.31
200m (Wind: 1.5 m/s)	James Ellington	20.56	(Wales) Christian Malcolm	20.63	Chris Clarke	20.69
400m	Martyn Rooney	45.93	Conrad Williams	45.97	Nigel Levine	46.00
800m	Andrew Osagie	1:46.89	Mukhtar Mohammed	1:47.52	Michael Rimmer	1:47.70
1,500m	Andy Baddeley	3:47.99	Ross Murray	3:48.20	(Scotland) Chris O'Hare	3:48.63
5,000m	Ross Millington	13:59.01	Nick McCormick	14:00.61	Rory Fraser	14:03.92
10,000 metres	(Ethiopia) Kenenisa Bekele	27:02.59	(Ethiopia) Tariku Bekele	27:03.24	(Ethiopia) Gebregziabher Gebremariam	27:03.58
110m hurdles (Wind: -0.1 m/s)	Andrew Pozzi	13.41	Lawrence Clarke	13.45	Andy Turner	13.52
400m hurdles	(Wales) Dai Greene	49.47	Jack Green	49.88	Nathan Woodward	50.56
3000m s'chase	Luke Gunn	8:42.20	James Wilkinson	8:42.86	Rob Mullett	8:42.86
5000m walk	Alex Wright	19:48.14	Tom Bosworth	20:26.13	(Republic of Ireland) Michael Doyle	21:42.99
high jump	Robbie Grabarz	2.28 m	Samson Oni	2.24 m	Tom Parsons	2.24 m
pole vault	Steven Lewis	5.50 m	(Scotland) Gregor MacLean	5.35 m	Andrew Sutcliffe	5.35 m
long jump	Greg Rutherford	8.12 m (+0.5 m/s)	JJ Jegede	7.90 m (+0.6 m/s)	Chris Tomlinson	7.89 m (-0.3 m/s)
triple jump	Larry Achike	16.19 m (-0.1 m/s)	Kola Adedoyin	16.07 m (+0.7 m/s)	Nathan Fox	15.73 m (+0.9 m/s)
shot put	Carl Myerscough	19.42 m	Scott Rider	18.36 m	Zane Duquemin	17.95 m
discus throw	Lawrence Okoye	63.46 m	(Wales) Brett Morse	62.27 m	Abdul Buhari	60.94 m
hammer throw	Alex Smith	74.79 m	(Scotland) Mark Dry	74.32 m	James Bedford	69.44 m
javelin throw	Lee Doran	79.72 m	Roald Bradstock	72.78 m	Neil Crossley	70.25 m

=== Women ===
Event	Gold		Silver		Bronze	
100m (Wind: -0.6 m/s)	Ashleigh Nelson	11.50	Anyika Onuora	11.51	Montell Douglas	11.52
200m (Wind: 0.5 m/s)	Margaret Adeoye	23.11	Anyika Onuora	23.23	Hayley Jones	23.42
400m	Christine Ohuruogu	51.89	Shana Cox	52.87	(Scotland) Lee McConnell	53.05
800m	(Scotland) Lynsey Sharp	2:01.72	Jemma Simpson	2:02.29	Jessica Judd	2:02.30
1,500m	Laura Weightman	4:18.83	Lisa Dobriskey	4:21.91	Montana Jones	4:21.94
5,000m	Jo Pavey	15:54.18	Barbara Parker	15:55.57	Julia Bleasdale	15:59.63
10,000m	(Ethiopia) Werknesh Kidane	31:28.19	Caryl Jones	32:52.53	(Poland) Iwona Lewandowska	32:56.25
100m hurdles (Wind: 0.3 m/s)	Jessica Ennis	12.92	Tiffany Porter	13.21	Sarah Claxton	13.27
400m hurdles	Perri Shakes-Drayton	55.45	(Scotland) Eilidh Child	55.53	Meghan Beesley	57.28
3000m s'chase	(Scotland) Eilish McColgan	9:56.89	Hatti Archer	10:02.35	(Scotland) Emily Stewart	10:02.85
5000m walk	Johanna Jackson	21:45.98	Heather Lewis	24:02.13	(Wales) Bethan Davies	24:47.87
high jump	Jessica Ennis	1.89 m	Isobel Pooley	1.85 m	Emma Perkins	1.81 m
pole vault	Holly Bleasdale	4.71 m NR	Kate Dennison	4.26 m	Sally Peake	4.26 m
long jump	Shara Proctor	6.95 m NR (+0.1 m/s)	Lorraine Ugen	6.74 m (+0.5 m/s)	Jazmin Sawyers	6.64 m (+0.8 m/s)
triple jump	Laura Samuel	13.73 m (+0.9 m/s)	Nadia Williams	13.46 m (-0.3 m/s)	Shakira Whight	13.30 m (+0.6 m/s)
shot put	Eden Francis	16.13 m	Shaunagh Brown	15.87 m	Rachel Wallader	15.66 m
discus throw	Eden Francis	53.09 m	Jade Nicholls	52.21 m	(Scotland) Kirsty Law	49.77 m
hammer throw	Sophie Hitchon	69.79 m	Zoe Derham	66.02 m	Carys Parry	64.96 m
javelin throw	Goldie Sayers	58.45 m	Laura Whittingham	53.13 m	Izzy Jeffs	52.38 m
