= 2015 British Athletics Championships =

- Dates: 3-5 July
- Host city: Birmingham, England
- Venue: Alexander Stadium
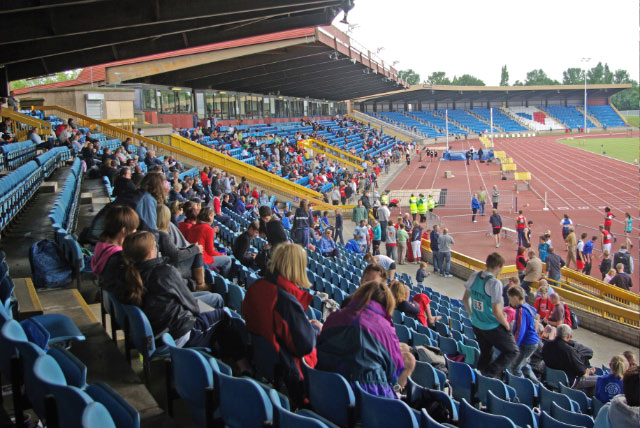
- Level: Senior
- Type: Outdoor

The 2015 British Athletics Championships was the national championship in outdoor track and field for athletes in the United Kingdom, held from 3–5 July 2015 at Alexander Stadium in Birmingham. It was organised by UK Athletics. A full range of outdoor events were held. The competition served as the selection event for the 2015 World Championships in Athletics.

== Medal summary ==
=== Men ===
Event	Gold		Silver		Bronze	
100m	Chijindu Ujah	10.10	James Dasaolu	10.24	Ojie Edoburun	10.27
200m	Zharnel Hughes	20.42	Danny Talbot	20.61	James Ellington	20.62
400m	Rabah Yousif	45.01	Jarryd Dunn	45.24	Martyn Rooney	45.88
800m	Kyle Langford	1:49.70	Michael Rimmer	1:50.04	(Wales) Gareth Warburton	1:50.41
1,500m	Charlie Grice	3:50.66	(Scotland) Chris O'Hare	3:51.03	Dale King-Clutterbuck	3:51.24
5,000m	Tom Farrell	13:42.20	Andy Vernon	13:44.27	Jonathan Mellor	13:52.04
110m hurdles	Lawrence Clarke	13.55	Joseph Hylton	13.91	Jake Porter	13.91
400m hurdles	Niall Flannery	50.16	Jack Houghton	50.60	(Wales) Dai Greene	50.82
3000m s'chase	Rob Mullett	8:38.95	Zak Seddon	8:41.03	Luke Gunn	8:45.13
5000m walk	Tom Bosworth	19:00.73	Callum Wilkinson	20:21.57	Dominic King	21:01.70
high jump	Robbie Grabarz	2.28 m	Chris Kandu Mike Edwards (Scotland) David Smith	2.20 m	Not awarded	
pole vault	Steven Lewis	5.35 m	Max Eaves	5.35 m	(Scotland) Jax Thoirs	5.20 m
long jump	Greg Rutherford	8.11 m	Dan Bramble	8.04 m	Julian Reid	7.88 m
triple jump	Julian Reid	16.95 m	Nathan Douglas	16.94 m	Nathan Fox	16.29 m
shot put	Scott Lincoln	18.54 m	Zane Duquemin	18.21 m	Scott Rider	17.88 m
discus throw	(Wales) Brett Morse	58.83 m	Zane Duquemin	56.02 m	Carl Myerscough	55.34 m
hammer throw	Nick Miller	75.88 m	(Scotland) Mark Dry	73.02 m	(Scotland) Chris Bennett	72.62 m
javelin throw	Bonne Buwembo	70.34 m	Matti Mortimore	66.78 m	Gavin Johnson-Assoon	64.30 m

=== Women ===
Event	Gold		Silver		Bronze	
100m	Dina Asher-Smith	11.08	Bianca Williams	11.43	Desirèe Henry	11.45
200m	Margaret Adeoye	23.51	Bianca Williams	23.56	Louise Bloor	23.80
400m	Anyika Onuora	51.87	Christine Ohuruogu	52.04	Shana Cox	52.64
800m	(Scotland) Lynsey Sharp	2:02.40	Shelayna Oskan-Clarke	2:02.80	Alison Leonard	2:03.26
1,500m	(Scotland) Laura Muir	4:10.37	Laura Weightman	4:14.83	Jessica Judd	4:16.08
5,000m	(Scotland) Stephanie Twell	15:38.01	(Scotland) Laura Whittle	15:41.13	Kate Avery	15:48.37
100m hurdles	Tiffany Porter	12.83	Cindy Ofili	12.96	Jessica Ennis-Hill	13.10
400m hurdles	(Scotland) Eilidh Doyle	55.57	Meghan Beesley	56.81	Hayley McLean	58.60
3000m s'chase	(Scotland) Lennie Waite	10:15.04	Emma Macready	10:29.16	Charlotte Green	10:31.17
5000m walk	Johanna Atkinson	22:03.55	(Wales) Bethan Davies	22:06.46	Heather Lewis	23:28.43
high jump	Isobel Pooley	1.97 m	Morgan Lake	1.88 m	Bethan Partridge	1.84 m
pole vault	Holly Bradshaw	4.50 m	Lucy Bryan	4.20 m	Jade Ive	3.90 m
long jump	Shara Proctor	6.86 m	Lorraine Ugen	6.69 m	Katarina Johnson-Thompson	6.56 m
triple jump	Sineade Gutzmore	13.35 m	Yamilé Aldama	13.08 m	Alexandra Russell	13.05 m
shot put	Rachel Wallader	17.42 m	Eden Francis	16.75 m	Sophie McKinna	15.97 m
discus throw	Jade Lally	57.37 m	Eden Francis	55.47 m	(Scotland) Kirsty Law	52.15 m
hammer throw	Sophie Hitchon	71.10 m	Sarah Holt	66.68 m	(Scotland) Susan McKelvie	61.30 m
javelin throw	Isabelle Jeffs	53.50 m	Freya Jones	53.38 m	Laura Whittingham	53.26 m
