= 2005 AAA Championships =

- Dates: 9–10 July
- Host city: Manchester, England
- Venue: Manchester Regional Arena
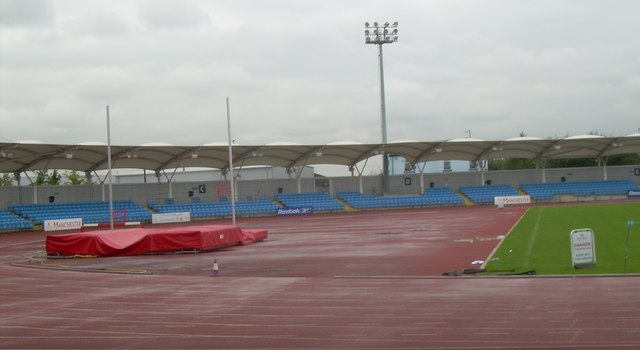
- Level: Senior
- Type: Outdoor

The 2005 AAA Championships was an outdoor track and field competition organised by the Amateur Athletic Association (AAA), held from 9–10 July at the Manchester Regional Arena in Manchester, England. It was considered the de facto national championships for the United Kingdom and was a selection event for both the 2005 World Championships in Athletics and the 2006 Commonwealth Games.

== Medal summary ==
=== Men ===
Event	Gold		Silver		Bronze	
100m	Jason Gardener	10.26	Mark Lewis-Francis	10.30	(Wales) Christian Malcolm	10.35
200m	(Wales) Christian Malcolm	20.65	Marlon Devonish	20.66	Chris Lambert	21.37
400m	(Wales) Tim Benjamin	45.52	Malachi Davis	45.84	Graham Hedman	45.88
800m	Tim Bayley	1:48.54	(Scotland) Ian Munro	1:49.08	Michael Rimmer	1:49.14
1,500m	Nick McCormick	3:37.05	Andrew Baddeley	3:37.08	Michael East	3:37.23
5,000m	(Republic of Ireland) Mark Carroll	13:48.90	Mark Miles	13:58.18	Michael Skinner	14:08.36
10,000m	Gavin Thompson	28:40.58	Keith Cullen	28:41.19	Matt Smith	29:16.90
110m hurdles	(Scotland) Allan Scott	13.62	Andy Turner	13.78	David Hughes	13.79
400m hurdles	(Wales) Matthew Elias	49.67	(Guernsey) Dale Garland	50.15	Liam Collins	50.46
3000m steeplechase	(Scotland) Andrew Lemoncello	8:33.93	Adam Bowden	8:36.36	Andy Robinson	8:38.85
5000m walk	(Republic of Ireland) Colin Griffin	20:44.45	Dominic King	21:07.50	Daniel King	21:29.40
high jump	Ben Challenger	2.27 m	Samson Oni	2.20 m	Darryl Stone	2.20 m
pole vault	Nick Buckfield	5.50 m	Keith Higham	5.40 m	Mark Beharrell	5.15 m
long jump	Greg Rutherford	7.79 m	(Scotland) Darren Ritchie	7.67 m	Jonathan Moore	7.54 m
triple jump	Nathan Douglas	17.64 m	(Wales) Steven Shalders	17.00w m	Phillips Idowu	16.29w m
shot put	Carl Myerscough	20.27 m	Scott Rider	18.85 m	Mark Proctor	18.60 m
discus throw	Carl Myerscough	58.48 m	Emeka Udechuku	56.64 m	Leith Marar	53.73 m
hammer throw	Andy Frost	72.09 m	Mick Jones	69.60 m	Carl Saggers	65.81 m
javelin throw	Nick Nieland	78.30 m	David Parker	72.98 m	Mark Roberson	69.72 m
decathlon	Ben Hazell	7193 pts	Edward Dunford	6984 pts	(Scotland) Roger Skedd	6931 pts

=== Women ===
Event	Gold		Silver		Bronze	
100m	Laura Turner	11.55	Jeanette Kwakye	11.61	Joice Maduaka	11.64
200m	Donna Fraser	23.36	(Republic of Ireland) Ciara Sheehy	23.63	Joice Maduaka	23.70
400m	Donna Fraser	51.27	Christine Ohuruogu	52.28	(Wales) Catherine Murphy	52.66
800m	(Scotland) Susan Scott	2:02.97	Jemma Simpson	2:03.34	Jenny Meadows	2:03.37
1,500m	Helen Clitheroe	4:08.29	(Wales) Hayley Tullett	4:12.67	(Republic of Ireland) Jolene Byrne	4:13.03
5,000m	Hayley Yelling	15:45.67	Natalie Harvey	15:50.21	Catherine Berry	16:01.38
10,000m	(Scotland) Kathy Butler	31:46.53	Hayley Yelling	31:53.61	Mara Yamauchi	32:36.57
100m hurdles	Sarah Claxton	12.96	Diane Allahgreen	13.21	Jessica Ennis	13.26
400m hurdles	Nicola Sanders	55.61	(Scotland) Lee McConnell	56.06	Liz Fairs	56.84
3000m steeplechase	Tina Brown	10:01.57	Jo Ankier	10:01.93	Claire Entwistle	10:16.81
5000m walk	Johanna Jackson	23:34.12	Niobe Menéndez	24:00.37	Katie Stones	24:03.61
high jump	Susan Jones	1.86 m	Julia Bennett	1.83 m	Natalie Clark	1.83 m
pole vault	Janine Whitlock	4.20 m	(Northern Ireland) Zoe Brown	4.10 m	Ellie Spain	4.10 m
long jump	Kelly Sotherton	6.48 m	Julie Hollman	6.25 m	Rebecca White	6.22 m
triple jump	(Republic of Ireland) Taneisha Scanlon	13.30 m	Nadia Williams	12.95 m	Stephanie Aneto	12.90 m
shot put	Julie Dunkley	16.14 m	Jo Duncan	15.55 m	Rebecca Peake	15.41 m
discus throw	(Wales) Philippa Roles	57.01 m	Claire Smithson	53.62 m	Kara Nwidobie	53.22 m
hammer throw	(Scotland) Shirley Webb	66.60 m	Zoe Derham	64.02 m	Lorraine Shaw	62.46 m
javelin throw	Goldie Sayers	57.99 m	Shelley Holroyd	55.14 m	Katy Watts	51.22 m
heptathlon	Kate Brewington	5041 pts	Katia Lannon	5021 pts	Paula Hendriks	5004 pts
