= Andy Frost (hammer thrower) =

British athlete (born 1981)

Personal information
- Nationality: British
- Born: 17 April 1981 (age 45) Isle of Wight, United Kingdom

Sport
- Sport: Athletics
- Event: hammer throw
- Club: Woodford Green with Essex Ladies
Medal record
Representing England
British Championships
Gold medal – first place	2007 Manchester	Hammer throw
AAA Championships
Gold medal – first place	2005 Manchester	Hammer throw
Gold medal – first place	2006 Manchester	Hammer throw
Silver medal – second place	2004 Manchester	Hammer throw
Representing Scotland
British Championships
Gold medal – first place	2013 Birmingham	Hammer throw
Representing Isle of Wight
Island Games
Gold medal – first place	2011 Sandown	Hammer throw
Gold medal – first place	2023 Guernsey	Hammer throw
Silver medal – second place	2017 Gotland	Hammer throw

Andrew Derek Frost (born 17 April 1981) is a British former athlete who competed in the hammer throw. He has a personal best distance of 72.79 metres.

== Biography ==
Frost born in the Isle of Wight, represented England at the 2006 Commonwealth Games in Melbourne.

He later competed for Scotland at the 2010 Commonwealth Games in Delhi, India. He just missed bronze medals by finishing 4th in both events. He also competed for Scotland at the 2014 Commonwealth Games in Glasgow, Scotland finishing 9th.

He is a four time British hammer throw champion after winning the British AAA Championships title in 2005 and 2006 and the British Athletics Championships in 2007 and 2013.

In 2023, he won the hammer gold medal at the Island Games.
