= Eugene Gilkes =

British

Personal information
- Nationality: British (English)
- Born: 5 March 1962 (age 64)

Sport
- Sport: Athletics
- Event: Decathlon
Medal record
Athletics
Representing England
Commonwealth Games
Bronze medal – third place	1990 Auckland	decathlon

Eugene Albert Emery Gilkes (born 5 March 1962), is a male former athlete who competed for England.

== Biography ==
Gilkes represented England in the decathlon event, at the 1986 Commonwealth Games in Edinburgh, Scotland. Four years later he represented England and won a bronze medal, at the 1990 Commonwealth Games in Auckland, New Zealand.

Gilkes became the British decathlon champion after winning the British AAA Championships title at the 1988 AAA Championships.

And during the sixth series of Gladiators (1997), he served as "Official Timekeeper" to Referee John Anderson.
