= 2003 AAA Championships =

- Dates: 25–27 July
- Host city: Birmingham, England
- Venue: Alexander Stadium
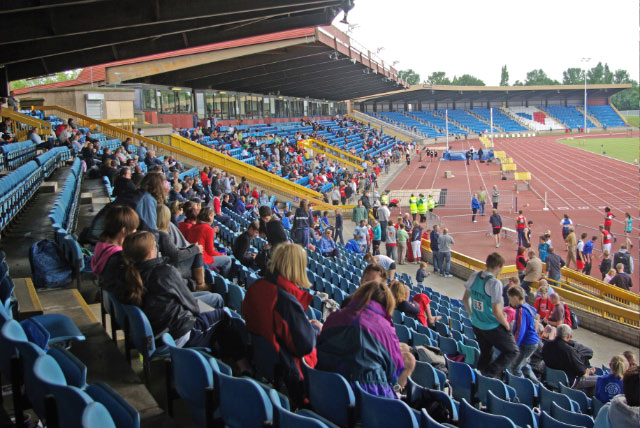
- Level: Senior
- Type: Outdoor

The 2003 AAA Championships sponsored by Norwich Union, was an outdoor track and field competition organised by the Amateur Athletic Association (AAA), held from 25 to 27 July at Alexander Stadium in Birmingham, England. It was considered the de facto national championships for the United Kingdom and was a qualifier for the 2003 World Championships in Athletics.

== Medal summary ==
=== Men ===
Event	Gold		Silver		Bronze	
100m	Darren Campbell	10.19	Mark Lewis-Francis	10.25	Jason Gardener	10.33
200m	Julian Golding	20.37	(Wales) Christian Malcolm	20.39	Darren Campbell	20.49
400m	Daniel Caines	45.56	Du'aine Ladejo	45.93	(Scotland) Ian Mackie	46.10
800m	Ricky Soos	1:47.51	(Northern Ireland) James McIlroy	1:47.97	Joel Kidger	1:49.04
1,500m	Michael East	3:42.29	Tom Mayo	3:42.66	Anthony Whiteman	3:43.22
5,000m	Andrew Graffin	13:56.59	Chris Davies	13:57.46	Sam Haughian	14:02.57
10,000m	Karl Keska	27:56.37	Andy Caine	28:57.17	Mark Hudspith	28:59.57
110m hurdles	Damien Greaves	13.66	Andy Turner	13.85	Mohammed Sillah-Freckleton	13.89
400m hurdles	Chris Rawlinson	49.24	Matthew Douglas	49.41	Anthony Borsumato	49.49
3000m steeplechase	Stuart Stokes	8:40.10	(Scotland) Kevin Nash	8:41.17	Andy Franklin	8:48.06
5000m walk	Steve Hollier	20:59.46	Mark Easton	22:14.82	Nick Ball	22:49.58
high jump	Ben Challenger	2.24 m	Ian Holliday	2.17 m	Dalton Grant	2.12 m
pole vault	Nick Buckfield	5.50 m	Ashley Swain Tim Thomas	5.41 m	Not awarded	
long jump	(Scotland) Darren Ritchie	7.74 m	Louis Burgess	7.53 m	Steve Phillips	7.34 m
triple jump	Larry Achike	16.55 m	Nick Thomas	16.44 m	Nathan Douglas	16.12 m
shot put	Carl Myerscough	21.55 m	Scott Rider	17.79 m	Marcus Gouldbourne	16.74 m
discus throw	Emeka Udechuku	57.26 m	Glen Smith	53.78 m	(Scotland) Scot Thompson	52.98 m
hammer throw	Bill Beauchamp	69.33 m	Mike Floyd	67.94 m	Simon Bown	64.43 m
javelin throw	Mick Hill	76.35 m	(Northern Ireland) Michael Allen	68.92 m	Neil McLellan	67.74 m
decathlon	Paul Tohill	6962 pts	(Guernsey) Dale Garland	6702 pts	(Scotland) Martin Taylor	6577 pts

=== Women ===
Event	Gold		Silver		Bronze	
100m	Joice Maduaka	11.31	Abi Oyepitan	11.54	(Scotland) Susan Burnside	11.76
200m	Abi Oyepitan	22.95	Joice Maduaka	23.42	Ellena Ruddock	23.58
400m	Helen Karagounis	52.51	(Wales) Catherine Murphy	52.92	Melanie Purkiss	53.58
800m	Lucy Vaughan	2:03.70	(Scotland) Susan Scott	2:04.13	(Scotland) Jennifer Ward	2:04.65
1,500m	(Wales) Hayley Tullett	4:08.12	(Scotland) Hayley Ovens	4:13.61	Kerry Gillibrand	4:15.03
5,000m	Hayley Yelling	15:53.20	Jo Kelsey	17:32.22	Only two finishers	
10,000m	Hayley Yelling	32:02.09	Vicky Gill	33:12.32	Debbie Robinson	33:19.67
100m hurdles	Rachel King	13.07	Sarah Claxton	13.12	Julie Pratt	13.48
400m hurdles	Liz Fairs	57.06	Katie Jones	58.61	Tracey Duncan	59.33
2000m steeplechase	Tara Krzywicki	6:28.07	Barbara Parker	6:36.50	Clare Martin	6:40.48
5000m walk	Lisa Kehler	23:10.15	(South Africa) Estlé Viljoen	24:15.04	Katie Stones	24:24.47
high jump	Susan Jones	1.86 m	Julia Bennett	1.82 m	(Wales) Julie Crane Stephanie Higham	1.78 m
pole vault	Tracey Bloomfield	4.15 m	Irie Hill	4.05 m	(Wales) Sonia Lawrence	4.05 m
long jump	Jade Johnson	6.49 m	Kelly Sotherton	6.38 m	Natasha May	6.10 m
triple jump	(Cuba) Yamilé Aldama	14.98 m	(Republic of Ireland) Taneisha Robinson-Scanlon	13.12 m	Rebecca White	12.78 m
shot put	Jo Duncan	16.19 m	(Northern Ireland) Eva Massey	15.35 m	Julie Dunkley	15.19 m
discus throw	Shelley Newman	58.16 m	(Wales) Philippa Roles	57.65 m	Claire Smithson	52.59 m
hammer throw	Lorraine Shaw	65.93 m	(Scotland) Shirley Webb	62.61 m	Liz Pidgeon	60.04 m
javelin throw	Goldie Sayers	56.29 m	(Scotland) Chloe Cozens	52.34 m	Katy Watts	44.95 m
heptathlon	Fiona Harrison	5517 pts	Maureen Knight	4748 pts	(Scotland) Jemma Scott	4546 pts
