= 1987 WAAA Championships =

British athletics event

- Dates: 24–25 July
- Host city: Birmingham
- Venue: Alexander Stadium
- Level: Senior
- Type: Outdoor

The 1987 WAAA Championships sponsored by the Trustee Savings Bank, were the national track and field championships for women in the United Kingdom.

The event was held at the Alexander Stadium, Birmingham, from 24 to 25 July 1987.

The Championships were the last WAAA Championships because as from 1988 the AAA Championships would hold both men's and women's events.

== Results ==
Event	Gold		Silver		Bronze	
100 metres	Paula Dunn	11.28	Eleanor Cohen	11.59	(Wales) Sallyanne Short	11.69
200 metres	Joan Baptiste	23.24	Louise Stuart	23.37	Pippa Windle	23.52
400 metres	Linda Keough	53.17	Loreen Hall	53.69	Carol Finlay	53.84
800 metres	Diane Edwards	2:03.59	(Scotland) Anne Purvis	2:04.40	Helen Thorpe	2:04.61
1,500 metres	Bev Nicholson	4:14.28	Shireen Bailey	4:14.52	Christina Cahill	4:18.10
3,000 metres	Wendy Sly	9:04.83	Christine Benning	9:11.35	Melissa Watson	9:11.53
5,000 metres	Catherine Newman	16:14.62	Marina Samy	16:25.38	Sally Lynch	16:34.60
10,000 metres	Sue Crehan	33:22.28	Jill Clarke	33:38.40	Lynn Everington	33:52.21
marathon+	Priscilla Welch	2:26:51	Véronique Marot	2:30:15	Paula Fudge	2:32:28
100 metres hurdles	Sally Gunnell	13.01	Lesley-Ann Skeete	13.18	Wendy Jeal	13.42
400 metres hurdles	(Australia) Sally Fleming	57.62	(Northern Ireland) Elaine McLaughlin	58.69	Lorraine Hanson	59.41
High jump	(Norway) Hanne Haugland	1.88	(Northern Ireland) Sharon McPeake	1.85	Michelle Wheeler	1.85
Long jump	Mary Berkeley	6.52	Kim Hagger	6.47	Joyce Oladapo	6.42
Shot put	Judy Oakes	18.44	Myrtle Augee	17.22	Yvonne Hanson-Nortey	16.03
Discus throw	Ellen Mulvihill	52.56	Kathryn Farr	51.60	Karen Pugh	51.04
Javelin	Fatima Whitbread	72.96	Sharon Gibson	57.60	Julie Abel	55.36
Heptathlon ++	(Norway) Anne Brit Skjæveland	5358	Charmaine Johnson	5136	Debbie Woolgar	5099
5,000 metres walk	Lisa Langford	22:35.04	Nicola Jackson	23:57.32	Sarah Brown	24:15.59
10,000 metres walk	Sarah Brown	51:48.7	Susan Gibson	53:05.1	Betty Sworowski	53:31.6

- + 1987 London Marathon (Best placed British athletes)
- ++ Held on 30 & 31 May at Stoke-on-Trent

== See also ==
- 1987 AAA Championships
