= Athletics at the 2014 Commonwealth Games – Women's shot put =

Women's shot put at the Commonwealth Games

The Women's shot put at the 2014 Commonwealth Games, as part of the athletics programme, was held at Hampden Park on 30 July 2014.

== Final ==
Rank	Name	#1	#2	#3	#4	#5	#6	Result	Notes
1st place, gold medalist(s)	Valerie Adams (NZL)	x	19.88	19.58	x	19.76	19.79	19.88	
2nd place, silver medalist(s)	Cleopatra Borel (TRI)	17.63	18.57	18.15	x	x	x	18.57	
3rd place, bronze medalist(s)	Julie Labonté (CAN)	17.25	17.09	17.12	17.31	17.43	17.58	17.58	
4	Rachel Wallader (ENG)	15.83	16.83	16.33	x	16.68	15.60	16.83	PB
5	Sophie McKinna (ENG)	15.55	15.86	16.59	15.30	16.11	15.36	16.59	
6	Eden Francis (ENG)	x	16.54	16.57	16.18	x	16.34	16.57	
7	Auriol Dongmo Mekemnang (CMR)	16.50	16.34	16.27	x	15.84	16.07	16.50	NR
8	Kirsty Yates (SCO)	16.42	x	15.85	x	x	x	16.42	PB
9	Nwanneka Okwelogu (NGR)	15.13	14.53	14.20				15.13	PB
10	Alison Rodger (SCO)	14.76	x	x				14.76	
11	Kim Mulhall (AUS)	14.50	14.55	14.35				14.55	
	Annie Alexander (TRI)	x	x	x				NM	
