= List of British athletics champions =

British Athletics Champions (outdoors)
- Frequency: annual
- Country: United Kingdom
- Inaugurated: AAC Championships (1866); AAA Championships (1888); UK Championships (1977); British Championships (2007)
- Organiser: UK Athletics

The List of British athletics champions (outdoors) covers four different competitions:

- the current British Athletics Championships, referred to as the UK Athletics Championships since 2023, which was founded in 2007,
- the preceding AAA Championships which existed from 1880 until 2006,
- the Amateur Athletic Club Championships (1866-1879) and
- the original UK Athletics Championships which existed from 1977 until 1994, and then held once in 1997 and ran concurrently with the AAA Championships.

During the period of overlap between the AAA Championships and the original UK Athletics Championships, the former was regarded by statisticians as the principle national championship, despite the presence of foreign guest athletes, as the home fields were generally stronger. Champions in the latter event are, however, were also recognised as national champions in their own right. In 1997 alone, the final year of the original UK Athletics Championships, (also referred to in that year as the British Athletics Federation Championships), it was considered the principle national championships of that season by statisticians, including the National Union of Track Statisticians.

== Past winners ==
- List of British champions in 60 metres
- List of British champions in 100 metres
- List of British champions in 200 metres
- List of British champions in 400 metres
- List of British champions in 800 metres
- List of British champions in 1,500 metres
- List of British champions in 3,000 metres
- List of British champions in 5,000 metres
- List of British champions in 10,000 metres
- List of British champions in 10 miles
- List of British champions in marathon
- List of British champions in 3,000 metres steeplechase
- List of British champions in 100/110 metres hurdles
- List of British champions in 200 metres hurdles
- List of British champions in 400 metres hurdles
- List of British champions in 3,000 metres walk
- List of British champions in 5,000 metres walk
- List of British champions in 10,000 metres walk
- List of British champions in decathlon/heptathlon
- List of British champions in discus
- List of British champions in hammer
- List of British champions in high jump
- List of British champions in javelin
- List of British champions in long jump
- List of British champions in pole vault
- List of British champions in shot put
- List of British champions in triple jump
