= Steve Hollier =

English racewalker

Personal information
- Nationality: British (English)
- Born: 27 February 1976 (age 49) Birmingham, England

Sport
- Sport: Athletics
- Event: Race walking
- Club: Wolverhampton & Bilston AC

Steven Alan Hollier (born 27 February 1976), is a male former athlete who competed for England.

== Biography ==
Hollier became the British champion in 2002 and 2003 after winning the British 50 Km walk title.

He represented England in the 50Km walk event, at the 1998 Commonwealth Games in Kuala Lumpur, Malaysia. Four years later he represented England again at the 2002 Commonwealth Games.
