= Rebecca Peake =

English female athlete

Personal information
- Nationality: British (English)
- Born: 22 June 1983 (age 42) Kilburn, Derbyshire, England

Sport
- Sport: Athletics
- Event: shot put
- Club: Sale Harriers Manchester; Loughborough Students

Rebecca Peake (born 22 June 1983) is an English female athlete who competed in the women's shot put. She has a personal best distance of 16.76 metres.

== Biography ==
Peake from Kilburn, Derbyshire, finished third behind Julie Dunkley in the shot put event at the 2005 AAA Championships.

Peake represented England at the 2010 Commonwealth Games in Delhi, finishing 5th.

She also won a silver medal at the UK Indoor National Championships in 2010 and another silver medal at the 2011 British Athletics Championships.

== Personal life ==
Academically, Peake has achieved a Professional Doctorate in Sports Management.
