= List of British champions in 5000 metres walk =

The British 5,000 metres walk athletics champions covers three competitions; the current British Athletics Championships which was founded in 2007, the preceding AAA Championships (1975-2006) and the UK Athletics Championships which existed from 1977 until 1997 and ran concurrently with the AAA Championships.

Where an international athlete won the AAA Championships the highest ranking UK athlete is considered the National Champion in this list.

== Past winners ==
WAAA Championships 5,000 metres, women's event only
Year	Women's champion
1975	Virginia Lovell
1976	Marion Fawkes
1977	Marion Fawkes
1978	Carol Tyson
1979	Marion Fawkes^{(3)}

WAAA Championships & UK Athletics Championships dual championships era 1980-1997
Year	WAAA Women	Year	UK Women
1980	Irene Bateman	1980	Carol Tyson
1981	Carol Tyson^{(2)}	1981	Carol Tyson^{(2)}
1982	Irene Bateman^{(2)}	1982	nc
1983	Jill Barrett	1983	Irene Bateman
1984	Jill Barrett^{(2)}	1984	Jill Barrett
1985	Virginia Birch	1985	Virginia Birch
1986	Helen Elleker	1986	Lisa Langford
1987	Lisa Langford	1987	Lisa Langford
1988	Betty Sworowski	1988	Betty Sworowski
1989	Betty Sworowski	1989	Lisa Langford^{(3)}
1990	Betty Sworowski	1990	Betty Sworowski^{(2)}
1991	Betty Sworowski ^{(4)}	1991	Vicky Lupton
1992	Vicky Lupton	1992	Vicky Lupton^{(2)}
1993	Vicky Lupton	1993	Julie Drake
1994	Verity Snook	n/a	
1995	Lisa Langford^{(2)}	n/a	
1996	Vicky Lupton	n/a	
1997	Catherine Charnock	1997	Sylvia Black

AAA Championships second era 1998-2006
Year	Men's champion	Women's champion
1998	nc	Lisa Kehler
1999	nc	Vicky Lupton^{(4)}
2000	nc	nc
2001	Lloyd Finch	Niobe Menendez
2002	Steve Hollier	Lisa Kehler
2003	Steve Hollier^{(2)}	Lisa Kehler^{(3)}
2004	Dominic King	Niobe Menendez^{(2)}
2005	Dominic King	Johanna Jackson
2006	Dominic King	Johanna Jackson

British Athletics Championships 2007 to present
Year	Men's champion	Women's champion
2007	Dominic King^{(4)}	Johanna Jackson
2008	Daniel King	Johanna Jackson
2009	Scott Davis	Johanna Jackson
2010	Alex Wright	Johanna Jackson
2011	Tom Bosworth	Johanna Jackson
2012	Alex Wright	Johanna Jackson
2013	Alex Wright^{(3)}	Bethan Davies
2014	Tom Bosworth	Hannah Lewis
2015	Tom Bosworth	Johanna Atkinson ^{(9)}
2016	Tom Bosworth	Bethan Davies
2017	Tom Bosworth	Bethan Davies
2018	Tom Bosworth	Bethan Davies
2019	Callum Wilkinson	Bethan Davies
2020	Callum Wilkinson^{(2)}	Gemma Bridge
2021	Tom Bosworth	Bethan Davies
2022	Tom Bosworth^{(8)}	Bethan Davies
2023	Christopher Snook	Heather Warner
2024	Christopher Snook ^{(2)}	Gracie Griffiths
2025	Cam Corbishley	Hannah Hopper
2026	Cam Corbishley ^{(2)}	Bethan Davies ^{(8)}

- nc = not contested
