= Liz Fairs =

English athlete (born 1977)

Personal information
- Nationality: British (English)
- Born: 1 December 1977 (age 47) Chelmsford, England

Sport
- Sport: Athletics
- Event: hurdles
- Club: Loughborough Students; Trafford AC

Elizabeth Jane Fairs (born 1977), is a female former athlete who competed for England.

== Biography ==
Fairs finished third behind Keri Maddox in the 100 metres hurdles event at the 1998 AAA Championships. Shortly afterwards Fairs represented England in the 100 metres hurdles event, at the 1998 Commonwealth Games in Kuala Lumpur, Malaysia.

Fairs became the British 400 metres hurdles champion after winning the British AAA Championships title at the 2003 AAA Championships.
