= Janet Smith (sprinter) =

British sprinter

Personal information
- Nationality: British (English)
- Born: 20 October 1968 (age 56) Purley, England
- Height: 173 cm (5 ft 8 in)
- Weight: 53 kg (117 lb)

Sport
- Sport: Athletics
- Event: Sprinting/400 metres
- Club: Mitcham & Sutton

Janet Margaret Smith (born 20 October 1968) is a British sprinter who competed at the 1988 Summer Olympics.

== Biography ==
Smith finished third behind Linda Keough in the 400 metres event at the 1988 AAA Championships.

She competed in the women's 4 × 400 metres relay at the 1988 Summer Olympics.
