= Betty Sworowski =

British racewalker

Betty Sworowski née Ellis
Personal information
- Nationality: British (English)
- Born: 12 March 1961 (age 64) Sheffield, West Riding of Yorkshire, England
- Height: 160 cm (5 ft 3 in)
- Weight: 48 kg (106 lb)

Sport
- Sport: Athletics
- Event: racewalking
- Club: Sheffield Road Walkers Club

Elizabeth Sworowski née Ellis (born 12 March 1961 in Sheffield, West Riding of Yorkshire) is an English retired female race walker who competed at the 1992 Summer Olympics.

== Biography ==
Sworowski finished third behind Sarah Brown in the 10,000 metres racewalk event at the 1987 WAAA Championships.

She represented England in the 10 km walk event, at the 1990 Commonwealth Games in Auckland, New Zealand.

Sworowski was a four times British 5,000 metres walk champion from 1988 through to 1991 and three times British 10,000 metres walk champion (1988, 1989 and 1991).

Sworowski set her personal best (45.59 minutes) in the 10 km race in 1991. At the 1992 Olympic Games in Barcelona, she represented Great Britain in the 10 km walk event.

== International competitions ==
Year	Competition	Venue	Position	Notes
Representing Great Britain
1990	European Championships	Split, Yugoslavia	15th	10 km
1991	World Cup	San Jose, United States	21st	10 km
1991	World Championships	Tokyo, Japan	20th	10 km
1992	Olympic Games	Barcelona, Spain	32nd	10 km

=== National titles ===
- AAA Championships 5000 metres (1988, 1989, 1990, 1991)
- AAA Championships 10,000 metres (1988, 1989 (tied), 1991)
- UK Championships 5000 metres (1988, 1990)
