= Sally Hamilton-Fleming =

Australian hurdler

Personal information
- Nationality: Australian
- Height: 179 cm (5 ft 10 in)
- Weight: 63 kg (139 lb)

Sport
- Sport: Athletics
- Event: 400 metres hurdles

Sally Hamilton-Fleming (born 14 May 1961) is an Australian hurdler who competed at the 1988 Summer Olympics.

== Biography ==
Fleming won the British WAAA Championships title in the 400 metres hurdles event at the 1987 WAAA Championships.

The following year Fleming competed in the women's 400 metres hurdles at the 1988 Olympic Games in Seoul.
