= Louise Stuart (athlete) =

British sprinter

Personal information
- Nationality: British (English)
- Born: 18 May 1967 (age 59) Middlesbrough, England
- Height: 169 cm (5 ft 7 in)
- Weight: 60 kg (132 lb)

Sport
- Sport: Athletics
- Event: Sprinting
- Club: Middlesbrough Cleveland Harriers
Medal record
Representing Great Britain
Summer Universiade
Silver medal – second place	1991 Sheffield	4x100 m relay

Katherine Louise Stuart (born 18 May 1967) is an English former sprinter who competed at the 1988 Summer Olympics.

== Biography ==
Stuart won a silver medal in the 200 metres at the 1985 European Junior Championships.

Stuart finished second behind Joan Baptiste in the 200 metres event at the 1987 WAAA Championships and second again at the 1988 AAA Championships but this time behind Simmone Jacobs.

Stuart went on to represent Great Britain in the women's 200 metres at the 1988 Seoul Olympics.

Stuart finished second for a third time at the 1990 AAA Championships.

== International competitions ==
Year	Competition	Venue	Position	Event	Notes
Representing Great Britain
1985	European Junior Championships	Cottbus, Germany	2nd	200 m	23.83
1985	European Junior Championships	Cottbus, Germany	3rd	4 × 100 m	44.78
1988	Olympic Games	Seoul, South Korea	26th (qf)	200 m	23.59
1990	European Championships	Split, Yugoslavia	13th (sf)	200 m	23.54
1991	Universiade	Sheffield, United Kingdom	6th	200 m	23.89
1991	Universiade	Sheffield, United Kingdom	2nd	4 × 100 m	44.97
(#) Indicates overall position in seminfinal (sf) or quarterfinals (qf)
