= 1988 AAA Championships =

Outdoor track and field competition

- Dates: 5–7 August
- Host city: Birmingham, England
- Venue: Alexander Stadium
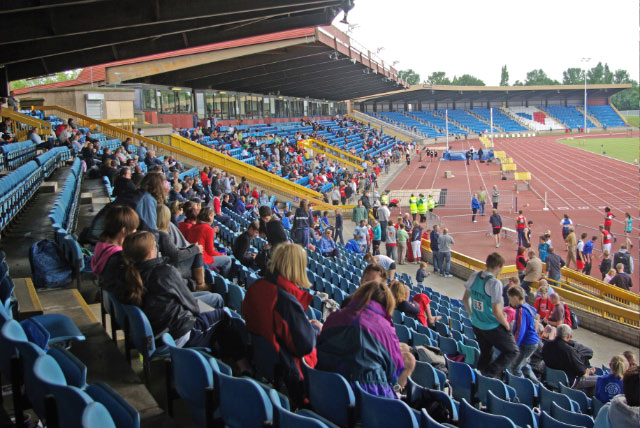
- Level: Senior
- Type: Outdoor

The 1988 AAA Championships was an outdoor track and field competition organised by the Amateur Athletic Association (AAA), held from 5–7 August at Alexander Stadium in Birmingham, England.It served as the trials for the 1988 British Olympic team. It was considered the de facto national championships for the United Kingdom, ahead of the 1989 UK Athletics Championships.

For the first time, men's and women's events were contested at the same championships, with the WAAA Championships merging with the previously men-only AAA Championships.

The men's decathlon, women's heptathlon and women's 5000 metres events were hosted in Stoke-on-Trent. The women's 10,000 m walk was held in London.

== Medal summary ==
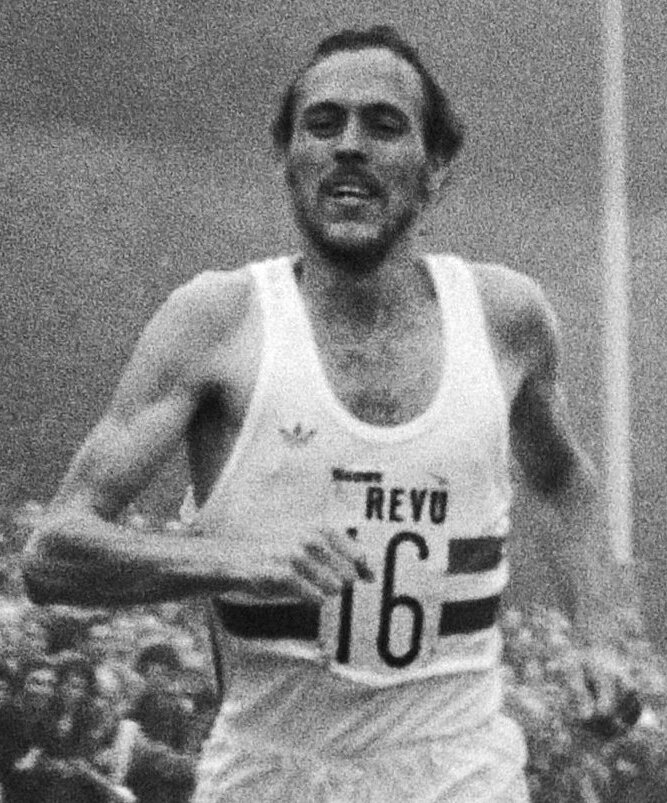
Mike McLeod was runner-up for the fourth time at the AAAs

=== Men ===
Event	Gold		Silver		Bronze	
100 metres	Linford Christie	10.15	John Regis	10.31	Barrington Williams	10.34
200 metres	Linford Christie	20.46	John Regis	20.56	Michael Rosswess	20.77
400 metres	Kriss Akabusi	44.93	Derek Redmond	45.23	Todd Bennett	45.27
800 metres	Steve Cram	1:44.16	(Scotland) Tom McKean	1:45.10	Steve Heard	1:45.32
1,500 metres	Peter Elliott	3:44.48	Steve Crabb	3:45.33	Adrian Passey	3:46.66
5,000 metres	Eamonn Martin	13:50.03	Gary Staines	13:51.33	Paul Davies-Hale	13:52.56
10,000 metres	Steve Binns	28:40.14	Mike McLeod	28:51.76	Mark Dalloway	28:53.10
marathon+	(Denmark) Henrik Jørgensen	2:10:20	Kevin Forster	2:10:52	(Japan) Kazuyoshi Kudo	2:10:59
110 metres hurdles	(Wales) Colin Jackson	13.29	Tony Jarrett	13.59	Jon Ridgeon	13.75
400 metres hurdles	Max Robertson	50.23	(Wales) Phil Harries	50.50	Martin Briggs	51.02
3000m steeplechase	Mark Rowland	8:32.60	(Wales) Roger Hackney	8:33.80	Eddie Wedderburn	8:34.23
10,000 metres walk	Ian McCombie	41:36.51	Paul Blagg	42:57.06	Chris Maddocks	43:23.56
High jump	(Scotland) Geoff Parsons	2.28 m	Dalton Grant	2.28 m	John Holman	2.20 m
pole vault	(Australia) Simon Arkell	5.10 m	Mike Edwards	5.00 m	Keith Stock	5.00 m
long jump	Stewart Faulkner	7.98 m	(Australia) Gary Honey	7.93 m	(Northern Ireland) Mark Forsythe	7.91 m
triple jump	John Herbert	17.12 m	Vernon Samuels	16.75 m	Mike Makin	16.60 m
Shot put	Simon Williams	17.78 m	Neil Gray	17.20 m	Carl Jennings	16.99 m
Discus throw	Paul Mardle	58.06 m	Graham Savory	55.24 m	Peter Gordon	53.76 m
hammer throw	David Smith	72.08 m	(Australia) Sean Carlin	71.64 m	Mick Jones	71.52 m
Javelin	Dave Ottley	80.34 m	Roald Bradstock	79.50 m	Mark Roberson	78.06 m
Decathlon	Eugene Gilkes	7529 pts	Alex Kruger	7456 pts	Greg Richards	7317 pts

=== Women ===
Event	Gold		Silver		Bronze	
100 metres	Paula Dunn	11.26	Simmone Jacobs	11.34	Beverly Kinch	11.52
200 metres	Simmone Jacobs	23.37	Louise Stuart	23.75	Pat Beckford	23.77
400 metres	Linda Keough	51.65	Pat Beckford	52.49	Janet Smith	52.89
800 metres	(Wales) Kirsty Wade	2:01.52	Shireen Bailey	2:02.49	Helen Thorpe	2:03.06
1,500 metres	Christina Cahill	4:08.26	Shireen Bailey	4:09.20	(Wales) Kirsty Wade	4:09.35
3,000 metres	(Scotland) Yvonne Murray	8:47.34	Jill Hunter	8:51.51	Wendy Sly	8:52.37
5,000 metres	Jane Shields	16:04.34	Shireen Samy	16:15.17	Ruth Partridge	16:18.05
10,000 metres	(Wales) Angela Tooby	33:13.95	Wendy Sly	33:34.79	Véronique Marot	33:49.10
marathon+	Ann Ford	2:30:38	(Wales) Susan Tooby	2:32:09	Sue Crehan	2:35:10
100 metres hurdles	Sally Gunnell	13.02	Lesley-Ann Skeete	13.19	Wendy Jeal	13.43
400 metres hurdles	Sally Gunnell	55.40	(Northern Ireland) Elaine McLaughlin	56.09	Simone Laidlow	57.00
5,000 metres walk	Betty Sworowski	24:24.32	Karen Dunster	25:28.56	Vicky Lupton	25:42.70
10,000 metres walk	Betty Sworowski	50:12.0	Sarah Brown	54:47.2	Vicky Lupton	55:04.9
High jump	(Northern Ireland) Janet Boyle	1.91 m	Joanne Jennings	1.88 m	(Northern Ireland) Sharon Hutchings	1.88 m
Long jump	(Australia) Nicole Boegman	6.82 m	Fiona May	6.79 m	Mary Berkeley	6.46 m
Shot put	Judy Oakes	18.76 m	Myrtle Augee	17.82 m	Yvonne Hanson-Nortey	15.90 m
Discus throw	(Northern Ireland) Jackie McKernan	51.80 m	(Wales) Venissa Head	51.14 m	Karen Pugh	50.54 m
Javelin	Sharon Gibson	57.32 m	Julie Abel	55.00 m	(Scotland) Shona Urquhart	51.46 m
Heptathlon	Joanne Mulliner	5728 pts	(Scotland) Shona Urquhart	5313 pts	Judy Simpson	5227 pts

- + 1988 London Marathon (Best placed British athletes in the women's marathon)
