= Hayley Yelling =

British long-distance runner

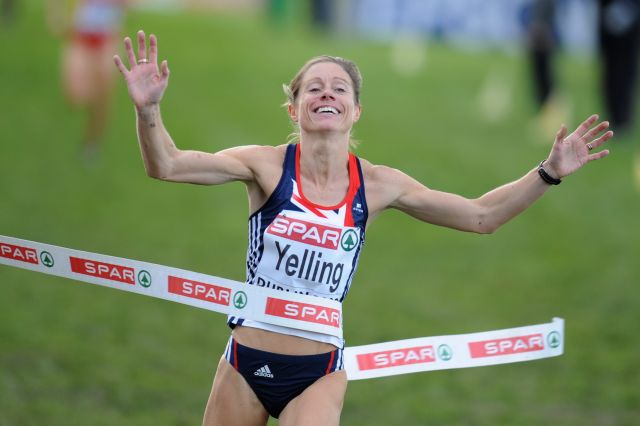
- Yelling competing in the 2009 European Cross Country Championships

Personal information
- Nationality: British (English)
- Born: 3 January 1974 (age 51) Dorchester, England

Sport
- Sport: Athletics
- Event: middle/long distance
- Club: Windsor, Slough, Eton and Hounslow Athletic Club

Hayley Yelling Higham (born 3 January 1974) is a British former runner. She is the sister-in-law of fellow British runner Liz Yelling.

== Biography ==
Yelling, a member of the Windsor, Slough, Eton and Hounslow Athletic Club, finished third behind Paula Radcliffe in the 5,000 metres event and third behind Birhan Dagne in the 10,000 metres event at the 2000 AAA Championships and then the following year she finished second behind Jo Pavey at the 2001 AAA Championships.

Yelling became the British 5,000 metres champion after winning the British AAA Championships at the 2002 AAA Championships and shortly afterwards she represented England at the 2002 Commonwealth Games in Manchester in the women's 10,000 metres event.

Yelling regained her AAA 5,000 metres title at the 2003 AAA Championships and 2005 AAA Championships and in between in December 2004, she won the European Cross Country Championship in Heringsdorf. Yelling was also officially the British champion over 10,000 metres in 2002, 2003 and 2006 by virtue of being the highest placed British athlete and represented England at the 2006 Commonwealth Games in Melbourne in the 10,000 metres.

In December 2009 she won the European Cross Country Championship in Dublin after coming out of retirement from competitive running. She followed this up a month later by coming fourth in the 2010 International Edinburgh Cross Country, fourteen seconds after winner Tirunesh Dibaba over the freezing 5.8 kilometre course.

She works as a Maths teacher at Sir William Borlase's Grammar School in Marlow.

== Career highlights ==
British National Championships
2002 – 1st, 5,000 m
2003 – 1st, 10,000 m
2003 – 1st, 5,000 m
2006 – 1st, 5,000 m

Other competitions
2004 – 1st, European Cross Country Championships
2007 – 1st, Cross Internacional de San Sebastián
2008 – 1st, Belfast International Cross Country
2009 – 1st, European Cross Country Championships

== Personal bests ==
Distance	Mark	Date	Location
3,000 m	8:58.98	4 July 2001	Cardiff
5,000 m	15:16.44	23 July 2005	Heusden
10,000 m track	31:45.14	12 June 2004	Utrecht
10,000 m road	32:31	5 February 2006	Chichester
Half marathon	1:12.11	1 October 2006	Newcastle
