= Susan Scott (runner) =

Scottish athlete (born 1977)

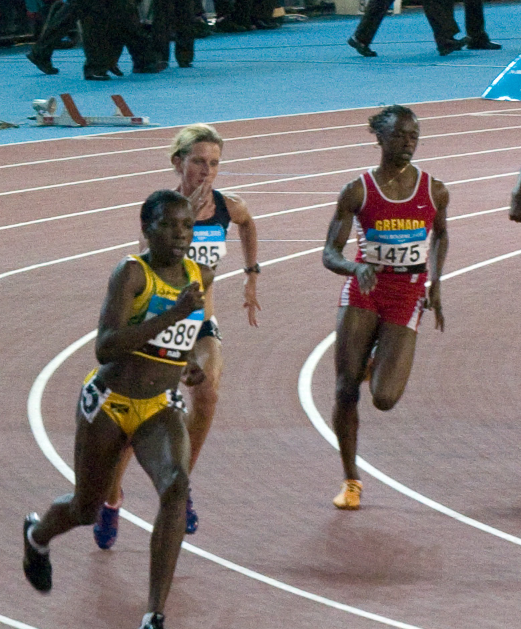
- Scott (centre) in the 2006 Commonwealth Games 800 metres semi-final

Personal information
- Nationality: British (Scottish)
- Born: 26 September 1977 (age 48) Irvine, Scotland
- Height: 171 cm (5 ft 7 in)
- Weight: 56 kg (123 lb)

Sport
- Sport: Athletics
- Event: middle-distance
- Club: City of Glasgow AC

Susan Scott (born 26 September 1977) is a Scottish track and field athlete who competed for Great Britain at the 2008 Olympic Games in the 1500 metres. She also finished fourth in the 800 metres final at the Commonwealth Games in 2002 and 2006.

== Biography ==
Scott was born in Irvine, North Ayrshire, Scotland.

At the 1999 AAA Championships, Scott finished second behind Jilly Ingman in the 3,000 metres event. Scott became the British 800 metres champion after winning the British AAA Championships title at the 2002 AAA Championships.

Representing Scotland, she finished fourth in the 800 metres final at the Commonwealth Games in Manchester 2002 and Melbourne 2006. In both finals, she broke the Scottish record. In running 1:59.30 in the 2002 final, she improved her best by over a second and broke the longest standing Scottish track record to become the first Scots woman to run under two minutes. The previous record of 2:00.15 by Rosemary Stirling, had stood for 30 years. Scott improved on this in the 2006 final with 1:59.02, which stood as the Scottish record until 2014, when Lynsey Sharp ran 1:58.80. As of 2015, Scott ranks 11th on the UK all-time list.

Scott won the AAA title again at the 2005 AAA Championships before finishing runner-up to Lisa Dobriskey at the 2008 British Athletics Championships. Her 1500 metres best of 4:07.00, was set in June 2008. At the 2008 Olympic Games in Beijing, Scott represented Great Britain where she was eliminated in the heats of the 1500 metres.

== International competitions ==
Year	Competition	Venue	Position	Event	Notes
Representing Great Britain / Scotland
1999	European U23 Championships	Gothenburg, Sweden	15th (h)	1500m	4:21.44
2002	Commonwealth Games	Manchester, England	4th	800 m	1:59.30
2005	World Championships	Helsinki, Finland	semis	800 m	2:01.17
2006	Commonwealth Games	Melbourne, Australia	4th	800 m	1:59.02
2008	World Indoor Championships	Valencia, Spain	heats	1500 m	4:10.39
2008	Olympic Games	Beijing, China	heats	1500 m	4:14.66
