= Mike Floyd =

English hammer thrower

Personal information
- Nationality: British (English)
- Born: 26 September 1976 (age 49) Wigan, England

Sport
- Sport: Athletics
- Event: Hammer throw
- Club: Sale Harriers
Medal record
Representing England
Commonwealth Games
Bronze medal – third place	2010 Delhi	Hammer throw

Michael Anthony Floyd (born 26 September 1976) is an English former hammer thrower. At the 2010 Commonwealth Games in Delhi he won a bronze medal. He holds a personal best of 72.45 m (237 ft 8 1/4 in), set in 2011.

== Biography ==
Floyd, born in Wigan, England, was a member of the Sale Harriers. Nationally, he ranked second at the AAA Championships in 2003 and 2006, as well as having third-placed finishes in 2002 and 2004. Floyd won his first national title at the British Athletics Championships in 2008. He was runner-up at the British Athletics Championships in 2007, 2010 and 2011, and third at the 2009 championships.

He was the Division B winner at the European Champion Clubs Cup in 2008, and placed seventh at the international 2008 European Cup that same year.

== International competitions ==
Year	Competition	Venue	Position	Event	Notes
2008	European Cup	Annecy, France	7th	Hammer throw	67.86 m
2010	Commonwealth Games	New Delhi, India	3rd	Hammer throw	69.34 m

== See also ==
- List of Commonwealth Games medallists in athletics (men)
