= Steven Shalders =

Welsh triple jumper

Personal information
- Nationality: British (Welsh)
- Born: 24 December 1981 (age 44) Bridgend, Wales

Sport
- Sport: Athletics
- Event: Triple jump
- Club: Cardiff AAC
Medal record
Men's Athletics
Representing Great Britain
Summer Universiade
Silver medal – second place	2005 Izmir	Triple Jump

Steven Mark Shalders (born 24 December 1981) is a former athlete from Wales who competed in the triple jump.

== Biography ==
Shalders finished tenth at the 2000 World Junior Championships, and at the 2002 Commonwealth Games he finished sixth in the triple jump and eighth in the 4 × 100 metres relay. He then won the silver medal at the 2005 Universiade and finished tenth at the 2006 Commonwealth Games.

His personal best jump is 16.71 metres, achieved in September 2005 in Manchester.

Shalders finished on the podium three-times at the British AAA Championships in 2002, 2004 and 2005.
