= Julian Reid =

British-Jamaican triple jumper

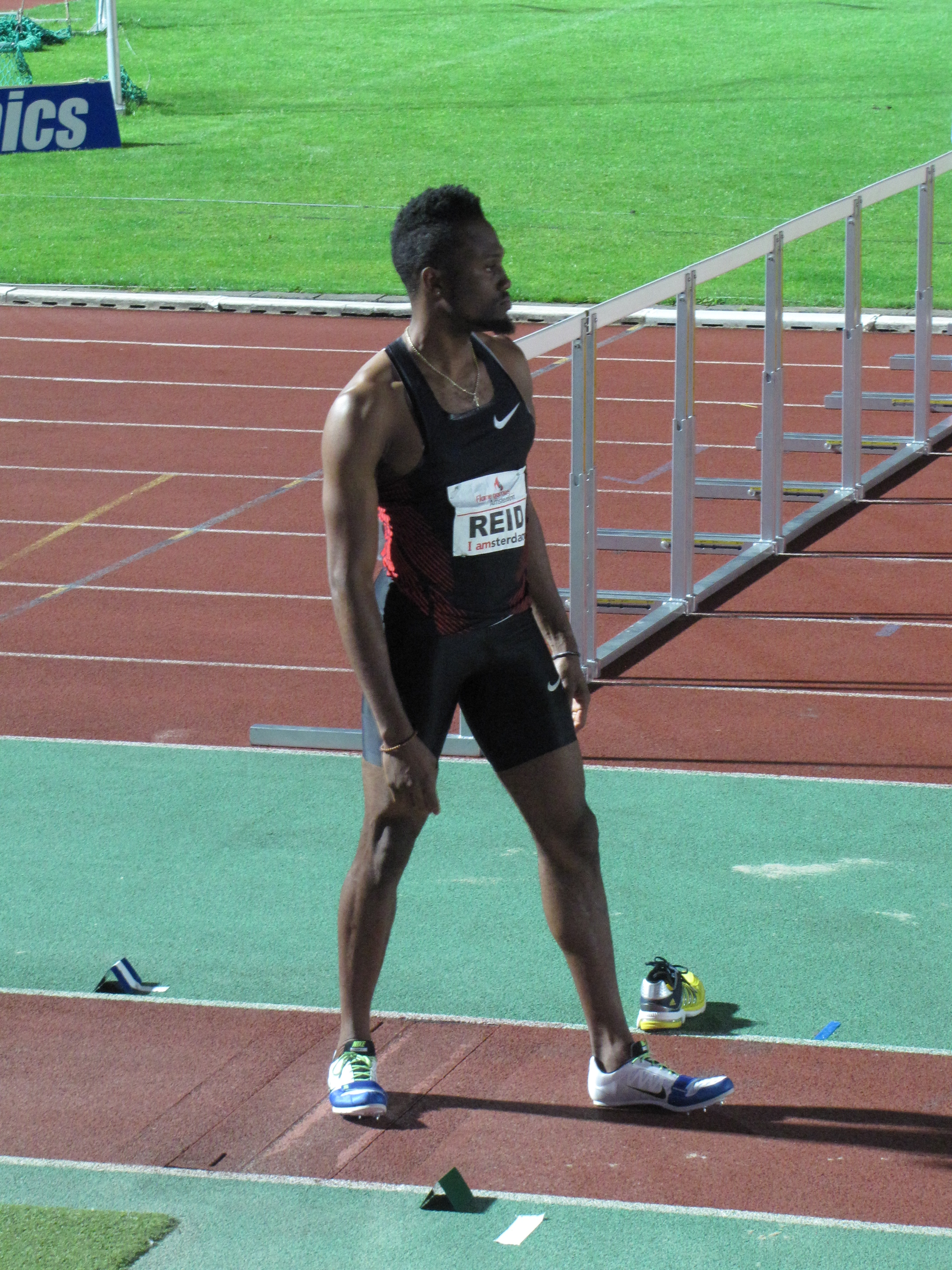
- Reid at the 2013 Flame Games in Amsterdam

Personal information
- Nationality: British/Jamaican
- Born: 23 September 1988 (age 38) Kingston, Jamaica

Sport
- Sport: Track and field
- Event: Triple jump
Medal record
Men's athletics
Representing Great Britain
European Championships
Bronze medal – third place	2016 Amsterdam	Triple jump

Julian Chiagoziem Reid (born 23 September 1988) is a British-Jamaican former athlete who competed in the long and triple jump. He switched his allegiance to Great Britain in 2011.

== Biography ==
He went to Texas A&M University.

Reid became the British long jump champion after winning the 2011 British Athletics Championships.

== Competition record ==
Year	Competition	Venue	Position	Event	Notes
Representing Jamaica
2005	World Youth Championships	Marrakesh, Morocco	35th (q)	Long jump	6.41 m
2006	CAC Junior Championships	Port of Spain, Trinidad and Tobago	5th	High jump	2.05 m
2007	CARIFTA Games (U20)	Providenciales, Turks and Caicos Islands	2nd	High jump	2.08 m
2007	CARIFTA Games (U20)	Providenciales, Turks and Caicos Islands	1st	Long jump	7.39 m
2007	Pan American Junior Championships	São Paulo, Brazil	2nd	Long jump	7.55 m
2007	Pan American Junior Championships	São Paulo, Brazil	6th	Triple jump	15.11 m
2008	Central American and Caribbean Championships	Cali, Colombia	4th	Long jump	7.76 m
2009	World Championships	Berlin, Germany	27th (q)	Triple jump	16.49 m
Representing Great Britain
2011	Universiade	Shenzhen, China	3rd	Long jump	7.96 m
2011	Universiade	Shenzhen, China	5th	Triple jump	16.61 m
2012	European Championships	Helsinki, Finland	21st (q)	Long jump	7.73 m
2014	European Championships	Zurich, Switzerland	13th (q)	Triple jump	16.52 m
2016	European Championships	Amsterdam, Netherlands	3rd	Triple jump	16.76 m
2019	European Indoor Championships	Glasgow, United Kingdom	17th (q)	Triple jump	15.93 m

== Personal bests ==
Outdoor

- High jump – 2.10 (Kingston 2007)
- Long jump – 8.08 (+0.7 m/s) (Kingston 2011)
- Triple jump – 16.98 (+1.4 m/s) (Fayetteville 2009)

Indoor

- High jump – 2.00 (College Station 2009)
- Long jump – 7.92 (Fayetteville 2008)
- Triple jump – 16.71 (College Station 2011)
