= Alex Wright (race walker) =

Irish racewalker (born 1990)

Personal information
- Nationality: British/Irish
- Born: 19 December 1990 (age 35) London, England
- Height: 1.75 m (5 ft 9 in)
- Weight: 61 kg (134 lb)

Sport
- Sport: racewalking
- Event(s): 10 km walk 20 km walk 50 km walk
- Club: Leevale Athletics Club

Achievements and titles
- Personal best(s): 10km: 40:04.29; 20 km: 1:20:50; 50km: 3:48:31

Alex Wright (born 19 December 1990) is a London-born Irish race walker. He competed at the 2016 Summer Olympics and the 2020 Summer Olympics.

== Biography ==
Wright, born in London, attended Brymore Academy where he began his race walking career.

He represented England at the 2010 Commonwealth Games in Delhi, where he placed 13th in the 20 kilometres walk.

He finished 31st at the 2013 World Championships.

Wright was three-times British 5000 metres walk metres champion after winning the British Athletics Championships in 2010, 2012, and 2013.

== See also ==
- List of eligibility transfers in athletics
