= Jonathan Mellor =

British long-distance runner

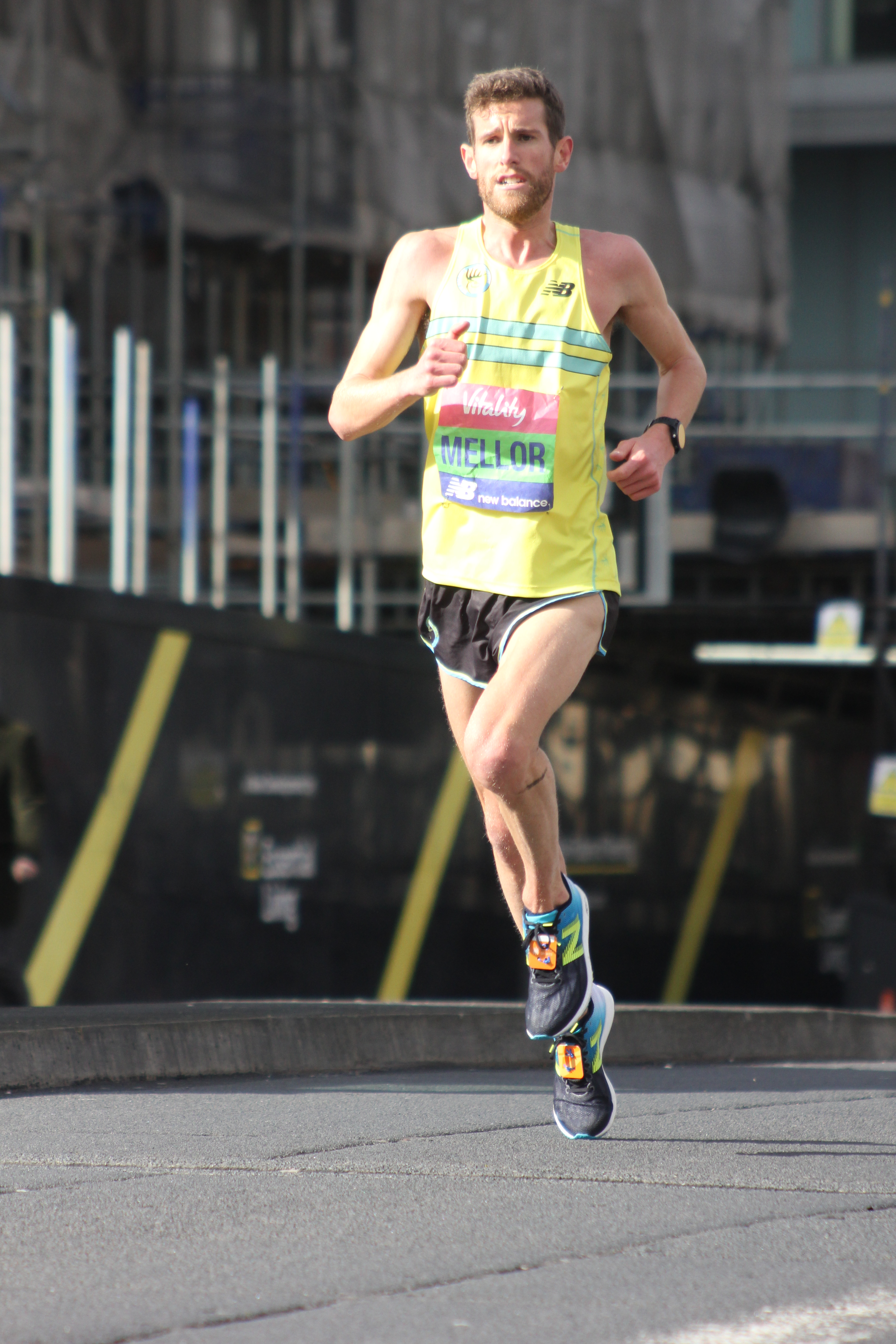
- Jonathan Mellor, running to 7th place in 2019 London Half Marathon

Personal information
- Nationality: British (English)
- Born: 27 December 1986 (age 39) Birkenhead, England

Sport
- Sport: Track and field
- Event: Marathon
- Club: Liverpool Harriers

Jonathan Richard Mellor (born 27 December 1986) is a British long-distance runner.

== Biography ==
Mellor competed in the 3000 metres event at the 2014 IAAF World Indoor Championships. He finished 10th place finish at the 2017 Berlin Marathon where he ran 2:12:57. He has a marathon personal best of 2:09:06 and was the British Marathon Champion in 2020.

He represented England at the 2014 Commonwealth Games in Glasgow, in the 10,000 metres event. and again at the 2022 Commonwealth Games in Birmingham, in the marathon.

Mellor podiumed four times in the 5,000 metres at the British Athletics Championships from 2011 to 2015 and became the British 10,000 metres champion after winning the 2015 British Athletics Championships.
