= Barbara Parker (athlete) =

Olympic steeplechaser

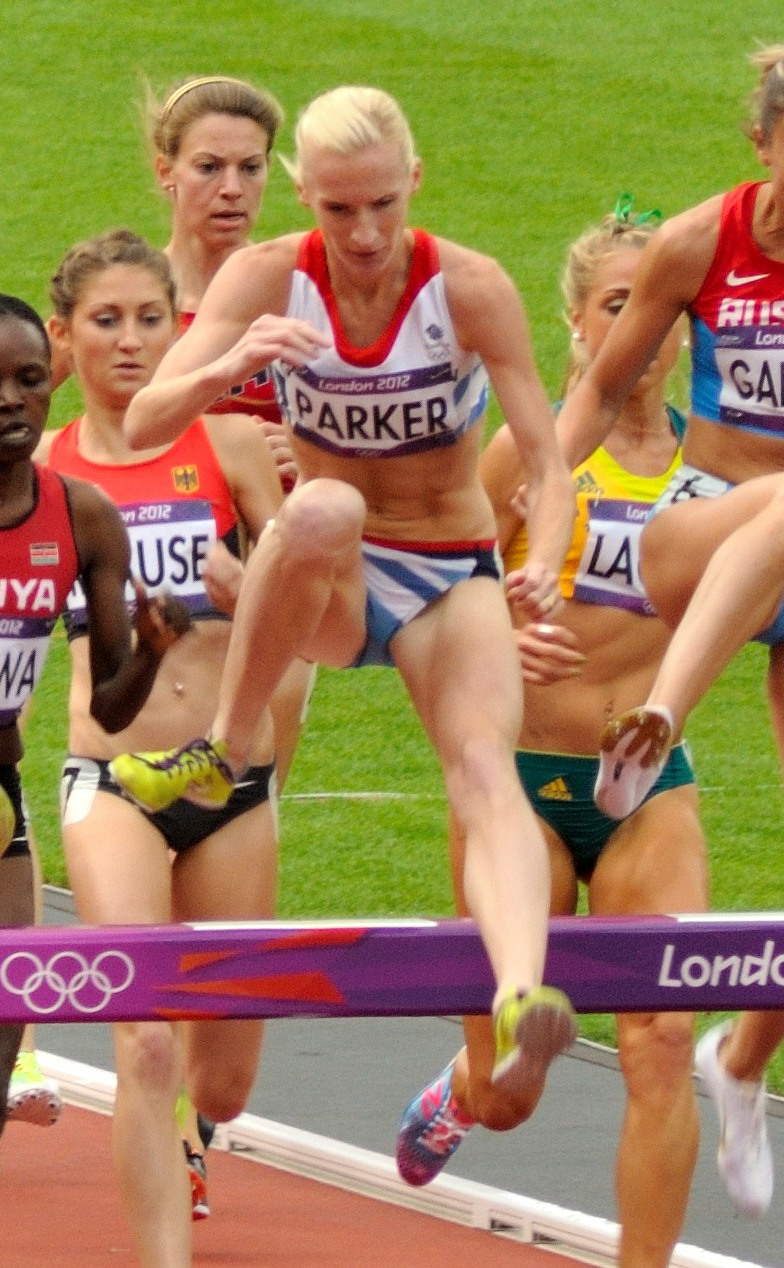
- Barbara Parker in the 3000m steeplechase at the 2012 Olympics

Personal information
- Nationality: British (English)
- Born: 8 November 1982 (age 43) Watford, England
- Height: 170 cm (5 ft 7 in)
- Weight: 54 kg (119 lb)

Sport
- Sport: Athletics
- Event: steeplechase
- Club: City of Norwich AC; Florida State Seminoles

Barbara Angela Parker (born 8 November 1982) is an English former track and field athlete who competed for Great Britain. She participated in two Olympic Games and is the former UK record holder in the 3000 metres steeplechase.

== Biography ==
Parker was born in King's Lynn, Norfolk, England but lived in Alabama. She studied a BTEC National Diploma in Sport and Exercise Science at the College of West Anglia from 1999 to 2001.

Parker finished second behind Tara Krzywicki in the 2000m steeplechase event at the 2003 AAA Championships.

At the 2008 Summer Olympics in Beijing,, Parker represented Great Britain in the 3000 metres steeplechase. She was eliminated in the heats, running 9:51.93. She reached the final of the 3000 m steeplechase at the 2011 World Championships in Daegu after running 9:38.12 in her heat. In the final, she finished 14th with 9:56.66.

Parker became the British steeplechase champion after winning the 2010 British Athletics Championships.

In June 2012, Parker broke the UK record in the 3000 m steeplechase with 9:24.24, which was unsurpassed until 2021. She competed at the London 2012 Olympic Games and was eliminated in the heats of both the 3000 m steeplechase and 5000 metres. In the 3000 m steeplechase, she ran 9:32.07, while in the 5000 m, she ran a personal best of 15.12.81.
