= Johanna Jackson =

British race walker (born 1985)

Johanna Atkinson née Jackson
Personal information
- Nationality: British (English)
- Born: 17 January 1985 (age 41) New Marske, England
- Education: Teesside University
- Height: 170 cm (5 ft 7 in)
- Weight: 55 kg (121 lb)

Sport
- Sport: Athletics
- Event: Race walking
- Club: Middlesbrough & Cleveland Harriers

Johanna Atkinson (née Jackson) (born 17 January 1985) is a British race walker. She was a Commonwealth champion.

== Biography ==
Jackson was coached by her mother Maureen Jackson, a professional sporting coach and represented England at the 2006 Commonwealth Games in Melbourne. Shortly afterwards Jackson finished second behind Ann Loughnane in the 5,000 metres walk event at the 2005 AAA Championships.

Jackson then proceeded to win six consecutive national 5,000m walk titles from 2007 to 2012.

Jackson married Dave Atkinson in St Thomas's Church in December 2012 and competed under her married name thereafter. As Johanna Atkinson she won an eighth national title at the 2015 British Athletics Championships.

Atkinson acted as a batonbearer when the 2022 Commonwealth Games Queen's Baton Relay came to Redcar.

== Achievements ==
Year	Competition	Venue	Position	Event	Notes
Representing Great Britain / England
2006	Commonwealth Games	Melbourne, Australia	7th	20 km walk	1:42:04
2006	World Race Walking Cup	A Coruña, Spain	54th	20 km	1:41:47
2007	European U23 Championships	Debrecen, Hungary	7th	20 km walk	1:36:28
2007	World Championships	Osaka, Japan	25th	20 km walk	1:39:34
2008	World Race Walking Cup	Cheboksary, Russia	45th	20 km	1:37:56
2008	Summer Olympics	Beijing, China	21st	20 km walk	1:31:33
2009	European Race Walking Cup	Metz, France	27th	20 km	1:45:05
2009	World Championships	Berlin, Germany	—	20 km walk	DSQ
2010	World Race Walking Cup	Chihuahua, Mexico	46th	20 km	1:47:12
2010	European Championships	Barcelona, Spain	10th	20 km walk	1:33:33
2010	Commonwealth Games	Delhi, India	1st	20 km walk	1:34:22
2011	European Race Walking Cup	Olhão, Portugal	12th	20 km	1:33:53
2011	World Championships	Daegu, South Korea	22nd	20 km	1:35:32
2012	World Race Walking Cup	Saransk, Russia	42nd	20 km	1:38:29
2012	Summer Olympics	London, United Kingdom	—	20 km walk	DSQ
2014	World Race Walking Cup	Taicang, China	48th	20 km	1:33:55
