= Lennie Waite =

British track and field athlete (born 1986)

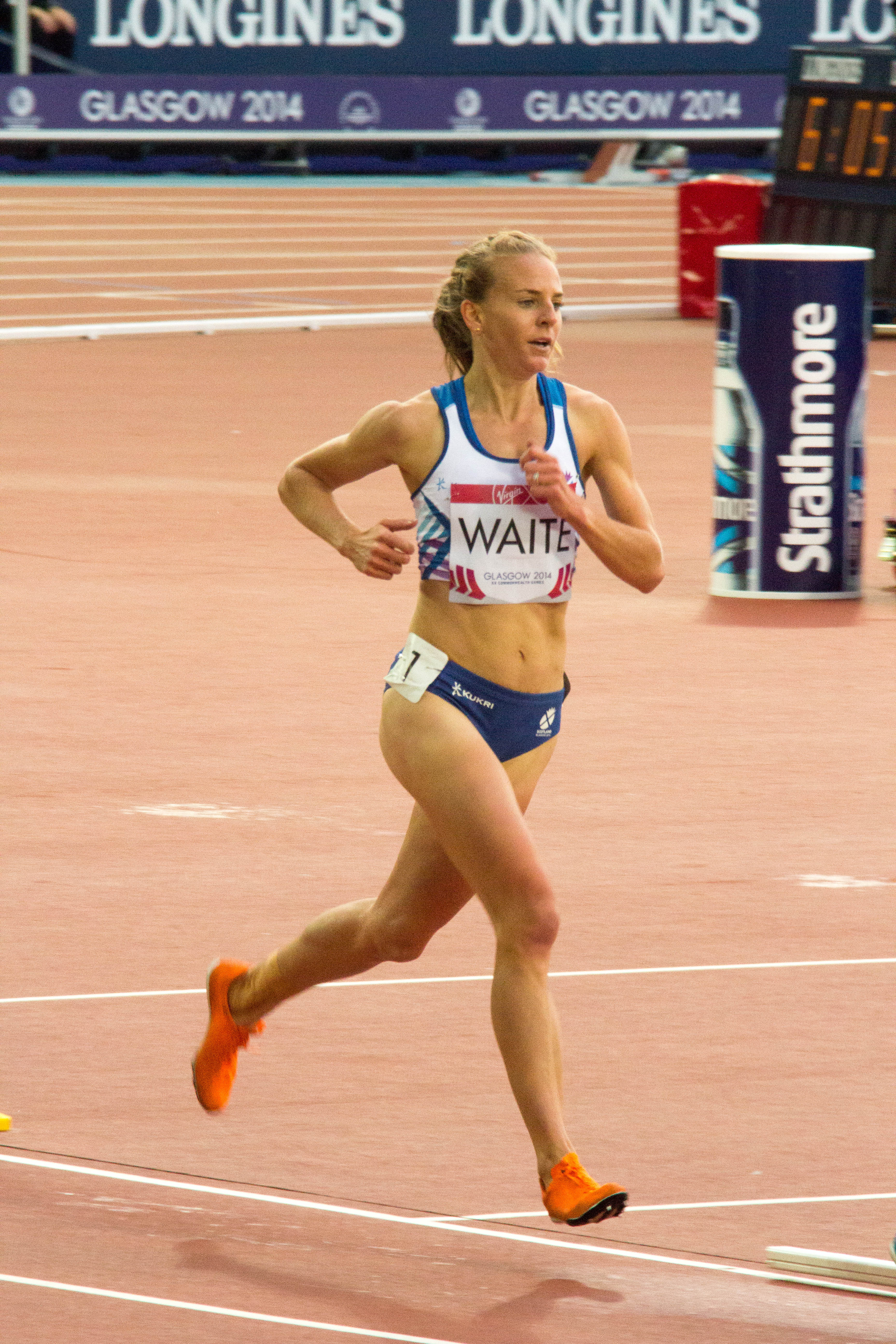

Personal information
- Born: 4 February 1986 (age 40) Paisley, Renfrewshire, Scotland
- Education: Rice University
- Height: 1.72 m (5 ft 7 1/2 in)
- Weight: 59 kg (130 lb)

Sport
- Coached by: Jim Bevan

Lennie Waite (born 4 February 1986 in Paisley, Scotland) is a British track and field athlete. She represented Great Britain in the 2016 Summer Olympics in the 3000m Steeplechase. She holds a personal best of 9:35.91 in the 3000m Steeplechase, achieved on 12 June 2016 at the Portland Track Festival. She is the sixth fastest British Steeplechaser of all-time.

Waite attended Rice University. She graduated cum laude in 2008 with a B.A. in Psychology, Economics, and Managerial Studies. During her time at Rice, she set school records in the mile, 1500m and 3000m steeplechase. Her records still hold in the mile and 1500m. Waite was a member of seven C-USA championship teams, was the high point scorer at the 2009 C-USA indoor track championships, and was part of Rice’s NCAA qualifying cross country teams in 2007 and 2008. Waite left Rice as a two-time All-American (mile & steeplechase), an Academic All-American, a top 10 finalist for the NCAA Woman of the Year Award (2009), and received both C-USA and NCAA post-graduate scholarships. After her career at Rice, she pursued her PhD at the University of Houston in Industrial/Organizational Psychology and continued to train under Rice University's Head Women's Track and Field Coach Jim Bevan as a professional steeplechaser.

Waite completed her PhD in Psychology in 2012 and supplements her professional track career as a sport psychology consultant and performance specialist. She is a certified mental performance consultant for the Association for Applied Sport Psychology (CMPC) and is passionate about helping athletes improve on the mental aspects of sport performance. She also serves as a volunteer coach for the Rice University Women's Track and Field Team.

Her first major international track and field competition was the 2010 Commonwealth Games, where she competed in the 3000m steeplechase for Scotland and finished 6th. In 2011, she represented Great Britain at the World University Games in Shenzhen, China, making it to the finals and finishing 7th. Missing out on the 2012 Olympics in London, she then had to wait until 2013 to represent her country again, when she represented Britain in the European Athletics Team Championships in the 3000m steeplechase and finished 5th with her best run of the season. Then in 2014, she represented Scotland in the 2014 Commonwealth Games in the steeplechase, and finished 10th. She also competed again in the 2014 European Athletics Team Championships in Braunschweig, Germany, and came 7th. In 2015, she finished second in the 3000m steeplechase at the European Athletics Team Championships in Cheboksary, Russia. Prior to the Olympic Games in 2016, she represented Great Britain at the 2016 European Athletics Championships in Amsterdam. She represented Great Britain in the World Championships in 2017 (London). In 2018, she made her third Commonwealth Games team for Scotland, competing again in the steeplechase in the Gold Coast, Australia.

Waite is currently an Assistant Professor in Psychology at the University of St. Thomas in Houston, Texas.
