= Dominic King =

British racewalker (born 1983)

Personal information
- Nationality: British (English)
- Born: 30 May 1983 (age 43) Colchester, Essex, England
- Height: 1.78 m (5 ft 10 in)
- Weight: 70 kg (150 lb)

Sport
- Sport: Athletics
- Event: Racewalking
- Club: Colchester Harriers

Achievements and titles
- Personal best: 50k walk – 3.55.48

Dominic King (born 30 May 1983) is a British racewalker. He was selected for the British team in the men's 50 km walk at the 2012 Summer Olympics, having previously competed for England in the 2002 and 2006 Commonwealth Games.

== Biography ==
King originally took up racewalking after being encouraged by his athletics club's coach. He competed in the 2002 Commonwealth Games at the age of 19, but was disqualified during the fifth lap after being in fourth place. At the 2006 Commonwealth Games, he finished in seventh place.

King took a four-year break from international competition prior to competing at a 2012 World Cup event in Saransk, Russia, where he finished in 51st place with his second-fastest time ever. At the Dudinska 50 km in Dudince, Slovakia, he set a new personal best of four hours, six minutes 34 seconds, eight minutes faster than his previous best. This placed him within the Olympic "B" qualifying time for the 2012 Summer Olympics of 4 hours and 9 minutes.

King suffered from a sleepless night after selectors did not let him know of his inclusion in the British team for the Games prior to the public announcement. The selectors had previously informed him that he would find out the day before the announcement. He was named as a member of the British squad, after being the only British athlete to achieve the qualifying time in the men's 50 km walk. King is the first competitor in the event for Great Britain since Chris Maddocks who competed at the 2000 Summer Olympics. Prior to the Olympics, he underwent altitude training with other members of the British squad in the Pyrenees. In the walk, he finished 51st, posting the time of 4:15.05. On the final lap, he gave hi-fives to members of the supportive home-crowd and games makers. His was the last ranked result of all participants of the walk.

Just one month after the 2012 Olympic Games, Dominic won the National Long Distance Walking Championships, completing 100 miles in 18 hours, 13 minutes and 9 seconds, and becoming centurion number C1098.

In 2019, he competed in the men's 50 kilometres walk at the 2019 World Athletics Championships held in Doha, Qatar. He was disqualified after a fourth red card.

King was a twice British 5000 metres walk champion after winning the British AAA Championships title in 2004 and the British Athletics Championships in 2007.

== Personal life ==
King lives in Colchester, and races for the Colchester Harriers club. He works at the University of Essex. He has a twin brother named Daniel, who is also a racewalker, and Dominic's training partner. Daniel raced against Dominic at the 2006 Commonwealth Games, and finished higher than his twin, in 5th position.
