= JJ Jegede =

British long jumper

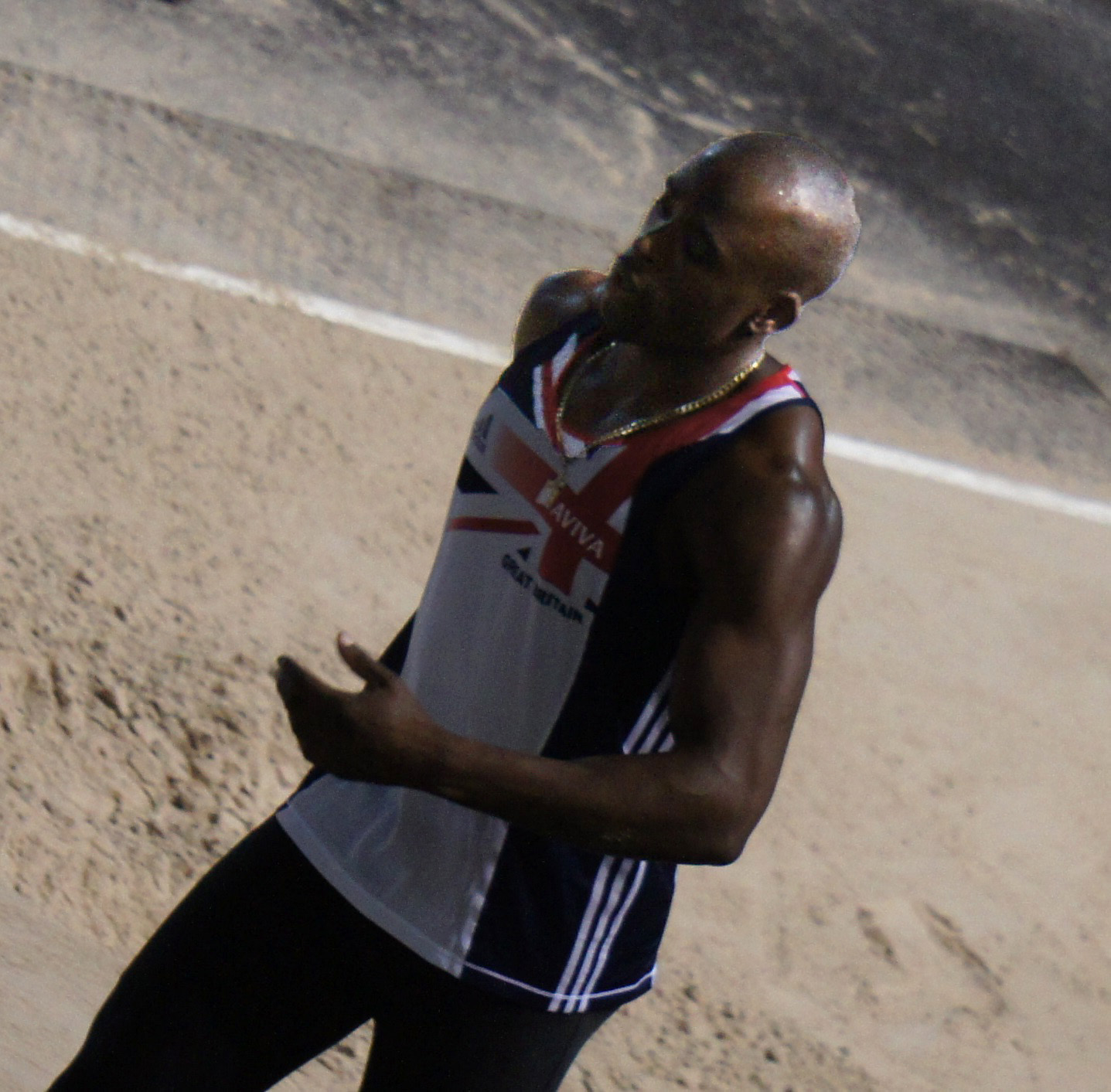
- JJ Jegede in 2013

Personal information
- Nationality: British (English)
- Born: 3 October 1985 (age 40) Newham, England
- Height: 6 ft 1 in (185 cm)
- Weight: 12 st 4 lb (78 kg)

Sport
- Sport: Athletics
- Event: Long jump
- Club: Newham & Essex Beagles

Achievements and titles
- Personal best: Long jump 8.11 m (London 2012)

Olugbayode Olusola Jegede (born 3 October 1985) is a British former track and field athlete who specialised in the long jump. He finished fourth in the long jump at the 2012 European Athletics Championships, just seven centimetres off a medal.

He works as a personal trainer and as mentor for young people.

== Early life ==
Jegede grew up in Hackney as the youngest of four children. He had a rough upbringing, going through a number of evictions when his mother was not able to pay rent. He attended Barking Abbey School. He wanted to become a professional footballer and was offered trials at Norwich and Tottenham Hotspur, but at the beginning of secondary school he was diagnosed with Osgood–Schlatter disease, which stopped him from playing.

He was not selected for the British team for the 2012 Summer Olympics, as he did not have the "A" standard of 8.20m. He competed at the Glasgow 2014 Commonwealth Games and European Championships in Zurich, making the final in both.

After finishing runner-up three times from 2010 to 2012, Jegede finally became the British long jump champion after winning the British Athletics Championships in 2014.

== Promotional work ==
In 2011, Jegede jumped over three Mini Coopers as part of an advertising campaign for the Mini London 2012 edition models. He is involved in the Metropolitan Police's Met Track scheme, as well as Sky's Living For Sport campaign. As part of this, he has done numerous school visits.

== Statistics ==
=== Personal bests ===
Event	Mark	Competition	Venue	Date
60 m	6.97i	Birmingham Games	Birmingham, Great Britain	2 February 2008
10 0m	10.89	London Inter Club Challenge	Hendon, Great Britain	26 July 2008
200 m	22.42	Loughborough International	Loughborough, Great Britain	18 May 2008
Long jump	8.11	London Grand Prix	Crystal Palace, Great Britain	13 July 2012
