= Eden Francis =

English female athlete

Personal information
- Nationality: British (English)
- Born: 19 October 1988 (age 37) Leicester, England

Sport
- Sport: Athletics
- Event: Shot/Discus
- Club: Leicester Coritanian AC
Medal record
Representing England
British Championships
Gold medal – first place	2009 Birmingham	shot
Gold medal – first place	2010 Birmingham	shot
Gold medal – first place	2011 Birmingham	shot
Gold medal – first place	2012 Birmingham	discus & shot
Gold medal – first place	2014 Birmingham	discus & shot
Gold medal – first place	2021 Manchester	discus

Eden Cherrelle Francis (born 19 October 1988 in Leicester) is an English female athlete who competes in the shot put and discus. She has personal best distances of 17.24 metres and 59.78 metres respectively in these events.

== Athletics career ==
Francis competed in both events at the 2014 Commonwealth Games in Glasgow, Scotland finishing 6th in the shot put and 7th in the discus.

She was the first British (male or female) athlete to win the discus event at the European Athletics U23 Championships, winning in Kaunas, Lithuania in 2009. This also represented Britain's first ever gold medal for a female discus thrower at European, World or Olympic level. Her gold medal was subsequently stolen during a burglary at her home.

She has been British champion eight times. Twice were indoors with the shot put in 2008 and 2015. The other six British titles were won outdoors with the discus in 2012 and 2014 and the shot put in 2009, 2010, 2012 and 2014. She is also the British under 20 record holder in the discus.
