= Abdul Buhari =

British athlete (born 1982)

Personal information
- Nationality: British/Nigerian
- Born: 2 June 1982 (age 44) Nigeria
- Height: 1.92 m (6 ft 3 1/2 in)
- Weight: 125 kg (276 lb)

Sport
- Sport: Track and field
- Event: Discus throw
- Club: Newham and Essex Beagles

Achievements and titles
- Personal best: 65.44 m

Abdul Buhari (born 26 June 1982) is a British/Nigerian former athlete who competed in the discus throw and competed at the 2012 Summer Olympics.

== Biography ==
Buhari, born in Nigeria, was educated at two state schools in London: at Millbank Primary School, a state primary school in the London Borough of the City of Westminster, and the London Nautical School, a selective boys' state secondary school in the London Borough of Lambeth.

Buhari is a member of the Newham and Essex Beagles club and was coached by Mark Wiseman. He works two days a week in the City of London, in operations support for investment bank Credit Suisse and spends the rest of the week training in Loughborough.

Buhari missed the 2010 Commonwealth Games due to injury. In 2011 he set a new personal best distance of 65.44 metres (214.7 ft). He won the UK Trials and Championships with a throw of 63.32 metres (207.7 ft), qualifying for the 2011 World Championships, held in Daegu, South Korea in the process. At the Championships he had a best throw of 60.21 metres (197.5 ft) in the qualifying round, finishing 30th out of the competing athletes and failing to advance to the final.

Buhari represented Great Britain and Northern Ireland at the 2012 European Athletics Championships in Helsinki, Finland, but failed to reach the discus final. At the 2012 GB Olympic Athletics Trials on 24 June in Birmingham, Buhari finished third with a best throw of 60.93 metres (199.9 ft); Lawrence Okoye won the event with a throw of 63.43 metres (208.1 ft), securing automatic selection for the 2012 Olympics, and Brett Morse finished second with a best of 62.27 metres (204.3 ft). In July 2012 he achieved the Olympic 'A' qualifying standard with a throw of 65.24 metres (214.0 ft) at a meeting in Barnet, London.

Buhari was selected to compete for Great Britain at the 2012 Summer Olympics in the men's discus alongside compatriots Lawrence Okoye and Brett Morse. The event was held at the Olympic Stadium on 6–7 August and Buhari finished in 29th, missing out on the final.
