= Dale Garland =

British athlete (born 1980)

Personal information
- Born: 13 August 1980 (age 46) Saint Peter Port, Guernsey, UK
- Height: 185 cm (6 ft 1 in)
- Weight: 79 kg (174 lb)

Sport
- Sport: Athletics
- Events: Decathlon; 400 m hurdles
- Club: Birchfield Harriers
Medal record
Men's athletics
Representing Great Britain
European Indoor Championships
Gold medal – first place	2007 Birmingham	4 × 400 m relay
Silver medal – second place	2005 Madrid	4 × 400 m relay
Representing Guernsey
Island Games
Gold medal – first place	2011 Isle of Wight	4 × 400 m relay
Silver medal – second place	2011 Isle of Wight	400 m hurdles
Silver medal – second place	2011 Isle of Wight	Long jump
Silver medal – second place	2011 Isle of Wight	4 × 100 m relay

Dale Mark Paul Garland (born 13 October 1980) is a Guernsey born British athlete who was selected for the 2008 Summer Olympics.

== Biography ==
Garland was educated at Elizabeth College, Guernsey. He was a member of the Birchfield Harriers.

Garland finished second to Paul Tohill in the decathlon event at the 2003 AAA Championships.

He competed in the 400 m hurdles at the 2007 World Athletics Championships and attended the 2008 Summer Olympics as part of the 4 × 400 m relay squad, but did not run in the competition.

== Competitive record ==
=== Commonwealth Games ===
- 2002 – 9th (Decathlon)
- 2006 - 5th (Decathlon)
- 2010 - Heats (400 m hurdles, 4 × 400 m)

=== AAA Championships ===
- 2004 Silver (400 m hurdles)
- 2005 Silver (400 m hurdles)
- 2006 4th (400 m hurdles)
- 2007 Gold (400 m hurdles)
- 2009 Bronze (400 m hurdles)

=== European Indoor Championships ===
- 2005 Silver (4 × 400 m relay)
- 2005 6th (400 m)
- 2007 Gold (4 × 400 m relay)

=== Island Games ===
- 2011 Silver (400 m hurdles)
