= Rachel Wallader =

English shot putter (born 1989)

Rachel Wallader (born 1 September 1989) is an English shot putter.

She finished fourth at the 2014 Commonwealth Games, sixth at the Gold Coast 2018 Commonwealth Games and twelfth at the 2016 European Championships. She has won a total of nine British titles. Five of these were during the indoor seasons of 2013, 2014, 2016, 2017 and 2018, and four during the outdoor seasons of 2013, 2015, 2016 and 2017.

Her personal best is 18.00 metres, achieved in May 2016 in Stoke Rochford.

In 2010, she was given a 12-month suspension for doping, using a banned stimulant, but served only four months as she could prove that the stimulant was not labelled on her dietary supplement.
