= Heather Warner =

British athlete

Personal information
- Nationality: British (Welsh)
- Born: Heather Lewis; 25 October 1993 (age 32) Clerkenhill, Nr.Haverfordwest, Wales

Sport
- Sport: Track and Field
- Events: 5K walk, 10K walk, 20K walk
- Club: Pembrokeshire Harriers
Medal record
Representing Wales
British Championships
Gold medal – first place	2014 Manchester	5000 walk
Gold medal – first place	2023 Manchester	5000 walk

Heather Warner (née Lewis, born 25 October 1993) is a Welsh racewalker. In 2023, she became the British champion in the 5000 metres race walk.

== Career ==
As Heather Lewis she represented Wales at the 2022 Commonwealth Games in the 10,000 metres walk event, recording a personal best 45:09.19, in a fifth place finish.

After getting married she competed as Heather Warner and became the British champion after winning the 5,000 metres walk event at the 2023 British Athletics Championships, held in Manchester. She had previously won the title at the 2014 British Athletics Championships under her maiden name.

Warner is a member of the Pembrokeshire Harriers.
