= AAA Championships =

Annual track and field competition

- Sport: Track and field
- Founded: 1880
- Folded: 2006
- Country: England/United Kingdom

The AAA Championships was an annual track and field competition organised by the Amateur Athletic Association of England. It was the foremost domestic athletics event in the United Kingdom during its lifetime, despite the existence of the official UK Athletics Championships organised by the then governing body for British athletics, the British Athletics Federation between 1977 and 1993, and again in 1997. It was succeeded by the British Athletics Championships, organised by the BEF's replacement (successor), UK Athletics under its brand name British Athletics.

== History ==
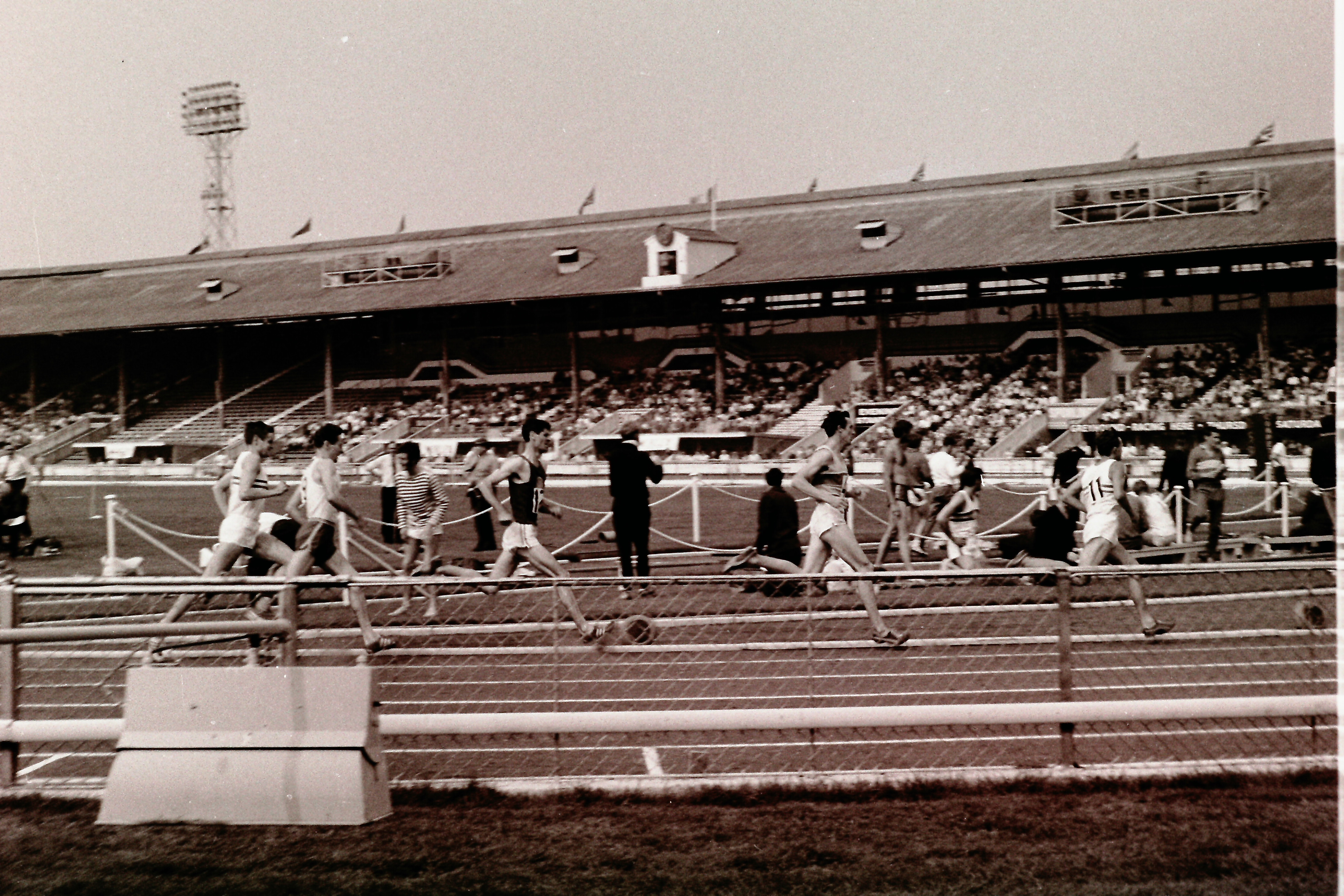
AAA Championships at White City

The competition was founded in 1880, replacing the Amateur Athletic Club (AAC) Championships, which had been held since 1866. Initially a men-only competition, a Women's AAA Championships was introduced in 1922 with the first proper WAAA Championships in 1923 and organised by the Women's Amateur Athletics Association until 1992, at which point it was folded into the Amateur Athletics Association. During the 1920s and early 1930s, the AAA Championships was Europe's most prestigious athletics event until the European Athletics Championships were inaugurated in 1934. Events were contested and measured in imperial units until metrification in 1969, in line with international standards.

Though organised by the English governing body, it was open to athletes from all over the world. The first overseas champion was Lon Myers of the United States who won the 440 yards in 1881. the first winner from Africa was Arthur Wharton from Ghana who won the 100 yards in 1886 and 1887. Foreign champions out-numbered those from the United Kingdom for the first time in 1904 when the United States team on their way to Paris for the Olympic Games stopped off in London and won eight of the fourteen events then on the programme.

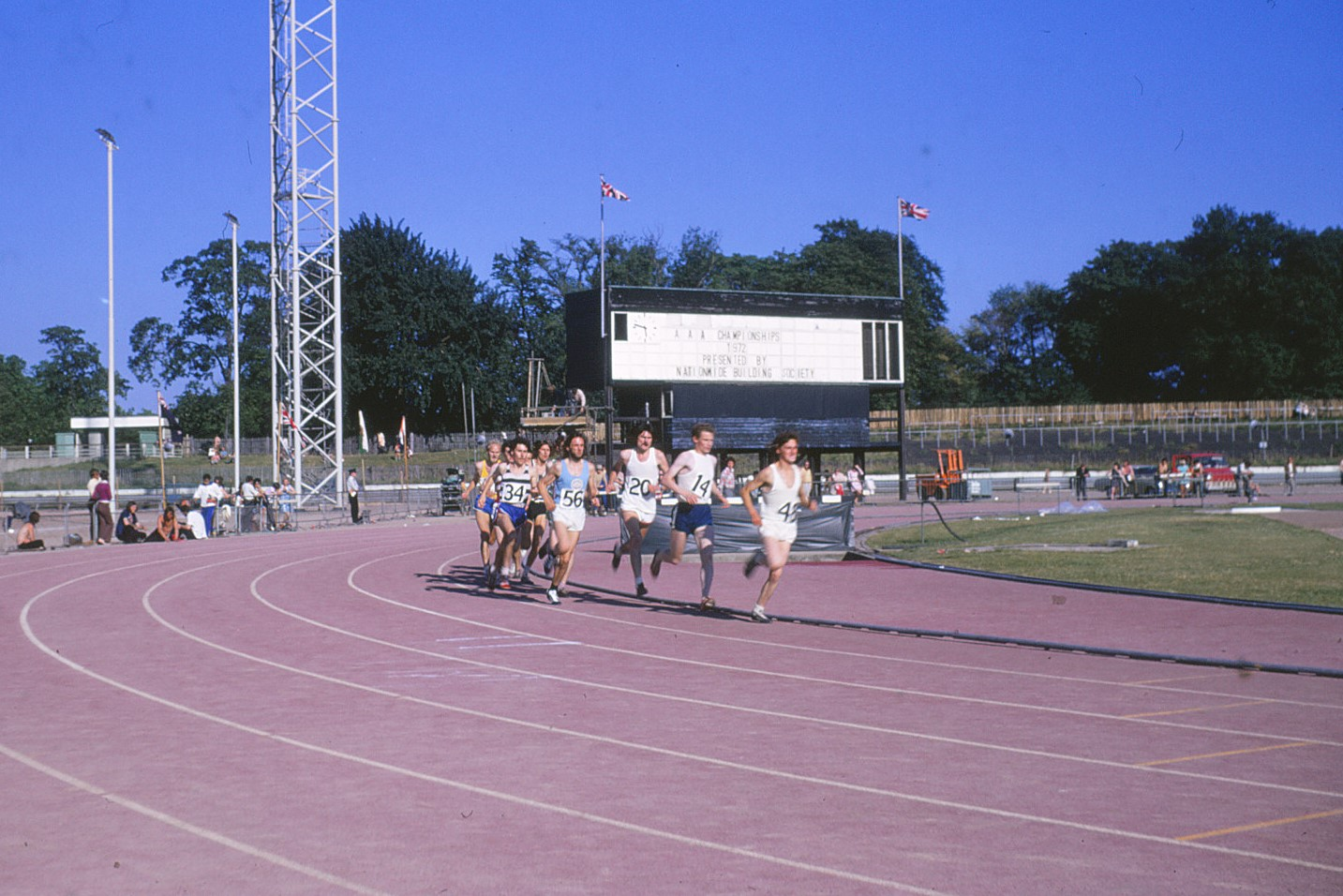
Track race at the 1972 event at Crystal Palace

It served as the de facto British Championships, given the absence of such a competition for most of its history. It was typically held over two or three days over a weekend in July or August. Foreign athletes were no longer allowed to compete from 1998 onwards (with the change first being trialled in 1996), though they were still allowed to participate (but not formally placed) in the 10,000 m and marathon events.

The creation of the UK Athletics Championships in 1977 under the British Amateur Athletic Board (later British Athletics Federation) marked a challenge to the event's domestic supremacy, though the quality of that rival event declined after it hosted the 1980 Olympic trials and it ceased as an annual championships after 1993, closing completely after 1997. The AAA Championships incorporated the UK Olympic trials every four years from 1988 to 2004. The women's WAAA Championships was folded into the AAA Championships in 1988.

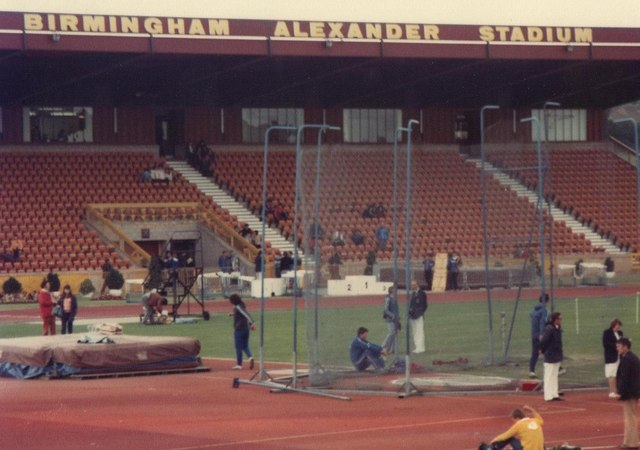
Alexander Stadium was the third permanent venue for the Championships

The establishment of UK Athletics in 1999 to serve as the national governing body for professional, elite athletics ultimately started the decline of the AAA Championships. UK Athletics took over the role of both national championships and international team selection with its own British Athletics Championships from 2007 onwards. The AAA Championships ceased to be a stand-alone event in its own right from that point onwards, though it re-emerged in 2016 in being co-held with the English Athletics Championships organised by England Athletics (a body for developing the grassroots level beneath UK Athletics).

The long-distance track events, marathon, racewalking events and combined track and field events were regularly held outside of the main track and field championship competition. Although the competition venue varied over the years, there were several locations that served as regular hosts over its history: Stamford Bridge (1886 to 1931), White City Stadium (1932 to 1970), Crystal Palace National Sports Centre (1971 to 1987) and Alexander Stadium (1984 to 2003).

== Evolution of events ==
In 1880 the programme consisted of fourteen events; 100 yards, 440 yards, 880 yards, 1 mile, 4 miles, 10 miles, steeplechase, 120 yards hurdles, high jump, pole vault, long jump, shot put, hammer and a 7 miles walk.

== Challenge Cups ==
On 4 April 1880 a meeting of representatives of the chief athletic clubs in the country was held at Oxford for the purpose of forming a governing body possessing the power of framing the laws and regulations of (track and field) athletics. The Amateur Athletic Association was the result. At that meeting the representatives of the Amateur Athletic Club handed over to the new association the challenge cups that had been competed for since the championship meeting was instituted in 1866. There were initially just nine cups, shown with their notional insurance value, as follows: 100 yards - Challenge Cup presented by Prince Hassan, 60 guineas. Prince Hassan was the brother of Tewfik Pasha the Khedive of Egypt, and was educated in England. 440 yards - Challenge Cup presented by Kenelm Thomas Digby, Esq., MP, 45 guineas, an Irish politician. 880 yards - Challenge Cup presented by Percy Melville Thornton, 45 guineas. Thornton was the son of Rear-Admiral Samuel Thornton. Educated at Harrow, an Oxford graduate, he won the AAC 880 yards in 1866, was the first Secretary of the Inter-University sports, inspired the boat race near Ghent in 1911 between 8 Jesus college oarsmen and a Belgian crew. Was Honorary Secretary Middlesex County Cricket Club for many years, an MP for the Clapham division of Battersea from 1892 to 1910. Married his cousin Florence Emily Sykes and wrote a book on Foreign Secretaries of the Nineteenth Century. 1 mile - Challenge Cup presented by Charles Bennett Lawes Esq. From Teignmouth, Devon, Lawes, went to Eton, and Trinity College, Cambridge University. He won the AAC 1 mile championship in 1866. 1st President Incorporated Society of British Sculptors. 4 miles - Challenge Cup presented by the Early of Jersey, 60 guineas. At the Oxford vs Cambridge match in 1865 he was fourth in the 2 miles, in a blinding snowstorm. The following year he was third in a 1-mile race won by Arthur Kemble in a howling gale. He was first President of the AAA. 10 miles - Challenge Cup presented by Walter Moresby Chinnery of the London Athletic Club, 50 guineas. Chinnery was the first amateur to run 1 mile in less than four and a half minutes, which he did at Cambridge on 10 March 1868, and on 30 May that year he repeated the feat at Beaufort House. In 1868 and 1869 he won both the 1 mile and 4 miles events at the AAC championship, and he again won the 1 mile in 1871. High jump - Challenge Cup presented by Sir Claude Champion de Crespigny, 3rd Baronet, 35 guineas. 120 yards hurdles - Challenge Cup presented by Lord Southwell, 45 guineas. 7 miles walk - Challenge Cup presented by John Chambers, founder and secretary of the AAC, 35 guineas.

== Editions ==
#	Year	Date	Venue	Stadium	Notes
1	1880	3 July	London	Lillie Bridge Grounds	Replaced the AAC Championships
2	1881	16 & 18 July	Birmingham	Aston Lower Grounds	
3	1882	1 July	Stoke	Stoke Victoria AC Grounds	7-foot square for the shot put introduced
4	1883	30 June	London	Lillie Bridge Grounds	
5	1884	21 June	Birmingham	Aston Lower Grounds	
6	1885	27 June	Southport	Southport Sports Ground	
7	1886	3 July	London	Stamford Bridge	
8	1887	2 July	Stourbridge	Stourbridge Cricket Ground	9-foot square for the hammer introduced
9	1888	30 June	Crewe	Alexandra Recreation Ground	
10	1889	29 June	London	Stamford Bridge	
11	1890	12 July	Birmingham	Aston Lower Grounds	
12	1891	29 June	Manchester	Manchester AA Grounds, Old Trafford	
13	1892	2 July	London	Stamford Bridge	
14	1893	1 July	Northampton	County Cricket Ground	
15	1894	7 July	Huddersfield	Fartown Ground	7 mile walk reduced to 4 mile walk
16	1895	6 July	London	Stamford Bridge	
17	1896	4 July	Northampton	County Cricket Ground	wire handles for the hammer legalised
18	1897	3 July	Manchester	Fallowfield Stadium	
19	1898	2 July	London	Stamford Bridge	
20	1899	1 July	Wolverhampton	Molineux Grounds	
21	1900	7 July	London	Stamford Bridge	
22	1901	6 July	Huddersfield	Fartown Ground	4 miles walk reverts back to 7 miles
23	1902	5 July	London	Stamford Bridge	220 yards first held
24	1903	4 July	Northampton	County Cricket Ground	
25	1904	2 July	Rochdale	Athletic Grounds	
26	1905	1 July	London	Stamford Bridge	
27	1906	7 July	London	Stamford Bridge	
28	1907	6 July	Manchester	Fallowfield Stadium	
29	1908	4 July	London	White City Stadium	7 foot circle for the hammer re-introduced
30	1909	3 July	London	Stamford Bridge	
31	1910	2 July	London	Stamford Bridge	
32	1911	1 July	London	Stamford Bridge	1-mile medley relay introduced
33	1912	22 June	London	Stamford Bridge	stop-board at the front of the circle for the shot put introduced
34	1913	5 July	London	Stamford Bridge	steeplechase standardised at 2 miles
35	1914	3–4 July	London	Stamford Bridge	440 yards hurdles, discus, javelin, and triple jump introduced
Not held 1915 to 1918 due to World War I
36	1919	5 July	London	Stamford Bridge	
37	1920	2–3 July	London	Stamford Bridge	56 lb weight event was held
38	1921	1–2 July	London	Stamford Bridge	
39	1922	30 June-1 July 1922	London	Stamford Bridge	moving the hands up the pole during the pole vault, in what was known at the time as the "climbing" technique was ended
40	1923	2–3 July	London	Stamford Bridge	
41	1924	20–21 June	London	Stamford Bridge	
42	1925	17–18 July	London	Stamford Bridge	marathon introduced
43	1926	2–3 July	London	Stamford Bridge	
44	1927	1–4 July	London	Stamford Bridge	4 x 440 yards relay and a 4 x 110 yards relay was introduced at the same time
45	1928	6–7 July	London	Stamford Bridge	decathlon was first held
46	1929	5–6 July	London	Stamford Bridge	
47	1930	4–5 July	London	Stamford Bridge	
48	1931	3–4 July	London	Stamford Bridge	steeplechase number of hurdles standardised and pole jump renamed pole vault
49	1932	1–2 July	London	White City Stadium	4 miles race reduced to 3 miles and the 6 miles event was introduced
50	1933	7–8 July	London	White City Stadium	
51	1934	13–14 July	London	White City Stadium	
52	1935	12–13 July	London	White City Stadium	
53	1936	10–11 July	London	White City Stadium	
54	1937	16–17 July	London	White City Stadium	
55	1938	15–16 July	London	White City Stadium	
56	1939	7–8 July	London	White City Stadium	
Not held 1940 to 1945 due to World War II
57	1946	19–20 July	London	White City Stadium	
58	1947	18–19 July	London	White City Stadium	
59	1948	2–3 July	London	White City Stadium	
60	1949	15–16 July	London	White City Stadium	
61	1950	14–15 July	London	White City Stadium	
62	1951	13–14 July	London	White City Stadium	
63	1952	21–22 June	London	White City Stadium	220 yards hurdles event introduced
64	1953	10–11 July	London	White City Stadium	
65	1954	9–10 July	London	White City Stadium	
66	1955	15–16 July	London	White City Stadium	
67	1956	13–14 July	London	White City Stadium	
68	1957	12–13 July	London	White City Stadium	
69	1958	11–12 July	London	White City Stadium	
70	1959	10–11 July	London	White City Stadium	
71	1960	15–16 July	London	White City Stadium	
72	1961	14–15 July	London	White City Stadium	
73	1962	13–14 July	London	White City Stadium	
74	1963	12–13 July	London	White City Stadium	220 yards hurdles discontinued
75	1964	10–11 July	London	White City Stadium	
76	1965	9–10 July	London	White City Stadium	
77	1966	8–9 July	London	White City Stadium	
78	1967	14–15 July	London	White City Stadium	
79	1968	12–13 July	London	White City Stadium	
80	1969	1–2 August	London	White City Stadium	Imperial distance events replaced with metric distances
81	1970	7–9 August	London	White City Stadium	
82	1971	23–24 July	London	Crystal Palace National Sports Centre	
83	1972	14–15 July	London	Crystal Palace National Sports Centre	
84	1973	13–14 July	London	Crystal Palace National Sports Centre	
85	1974	12–13 July	London	Crystal Palace National Sports Centre	
86	1975	1–2 August	London	Crystal Palace National Sports Centre	
87	1976	13–14 August	London	Crystal Palace National Sports Centre	
88	1977	22–23 July	London	Crystal Palace National Sports Centre	
89	1978	23–24 June	London	Crystal Palace National Sports Centre	
90	1979	13–14 July	London	Crystal Palace National Sports Centre	
91	1980	5–6 September	London	Crystal Palace National Sports Centre	
92	1981	7–8 August	London	Crystal Palace National Sports Centre	
93	1982	24–25 July	London	Crystal Palace National Sports Centre	
94	1983	23–24 July	London	Crystal Palace National Sports Centre	The London marathon counts as the AAA title
95	1984	23–24 June	Birmingham	Alexander Stadium	
96	1985	13–14 July	London	Crystal Palace National Sports Centre	
97	1986	20–21 June	Birmingham	Alexander Stadium	
98	1987	1–2 August	London	Crystal Palace National Sports Centre	
99	1988	5–7 August	Birmingham	Alexander Stadium	Olympic trials, women's championships held in conjunction for first time
100	1989	11–13 August	Birmingham	Alexander Stadium	3000 metres introduced
101	1990	3–4 August	Birmingham	Alexander Stadium	
102	1991	26–27 July	Birmingham	Alexander Stadium	
103	1992	27–28 July	Birmingham	Alexander Stadium	Olympic trials
104	1993	16–17 July	Birmingham	Alexander Stadium	
105	1994	11–12 June	Sheffield	Don Valley Stadium	
106	1995	15–16 July	Birmingham	Alexander Stadium	
107	1996	15–16 June	Birmingham	Alexander Stadium	Olympic trials
108	1997	24–25 August	Birmingham	Alexander Stadium	
109	1998	24–26 July	Birmingham	Alexander Stadium	
110	1999	23–25 July	Birmingham	Alexander Stadium	
111	2000	11–13 August	Birmingham	Alexander Stadium	Olympic trials
112	2001	13–15 July	Birmingham	Alexander Stadium	10,000m walk reduced to 5,000m walk
113	2002	12–14 July	Birmingham	Alexander Stadium	women's 2000 metres steeplechase introduced
114	2003	25–27 July	Birmingham	Alexander Stadium	
115	2004	10–11 July	Manchester	Sportcity	Olympic trials
116	2005	9–10 July	Manchester	Sportcity	
117	2006	15–16 July	Manchester	Sportcity	

== Most successful athletes by event ==
Event	Men	Men's titles	Women	Women's titles
100 metres	Linford Christie	8	Joice Maduaka	5
200 metres	John Regis	6	Kathy Smallwood-Cook	6
400 metres	David Jenkins	6	Joslyn Hoyte-Smith Linda Keough	3
800 metres	Steve Ovett Steve Cram Curtis Robb	3	Kelly Holmes	7
1500 metres	John Mayock	6	Hayley Tullett	4
3000 metres	No multiple champions	—	Yvonne Murray	4
5000 metres	Eamonn Martin Brendan Foster	3	Hayley Yelling	3
10,000 metres	Dave Bedford	5	Hayley Yelling	3
3000 m steeplechase	Maurice Herriott	7	Tina Brown	2
110/100 m hurdles	Colin Jackson	11	Sally Gunnell	7
400 m hurdles	Chris Rawlinson	6	Gowry Retchakan	5
High jump	Benjamin Howard Baker	6	Dorothy Tyler	8
Pole vault	Tom Ray	7	Janine Whitlock	6
Long jump	Peter O'Connor	6	Ethel Raby	6
Triple jump	Willem Peters (NED)	6	Michelle Griffith	5
Shot put	Denis Horgan (IRE)	13	Judy Oakes	17
Discus throw	Bill Tancred	7	Suzanne Allday	7
Hammer throw	Mick Jones Tom Nicolson	6	Lorraine Shaw	6
Javelin throw	Mick Hill Dave Travis	7	Tessa Sanderson	10
Combined events	Leslie Pinder	4	Mary Peters	8
3000/5000 m race walk	Roger Mills	10	Betty Sworowski	4
10,000 m race walk	Brian Adams	5	Irene Bateman Helen Elleker Betty Sworowski Vicky Lupton	3

== See also ==
- List of British athletics champions
- WAAA Championships
