= Great Britain at the 2020 Summer Olympics =

- Flag of the United Kingdom
- IOC code: GBR
- NOC: British Olympic Association

in Tokyo, Japan 23 July 2021 – 8 August 2021
- Competitors: 376 (176 men and 200 women) in 28 sports
- Flag bearers (opening): Hannah Mills; Moe Sbihi
- Flag bearer (closing): Laura Kenny
- Officials: Mark England (Chef de Mission)
- Medals Ranked 4th: Gold 22 Silver 20 Bronze 22 Total 64

Summer Olympics appearances (overview)
- 1896; 1900; 1904; 1908; 1912; 1920; 1924; 1928; 1932; 1936; 1948; 1952; 1956; 1960; 1964; 1968; 1972; 1976; 1980; 1984; 1988; 1992; 1996; 2000; 2004; 2008; 2012; 2016; 2020; 2024; 2028

Other related appearances
- 1906 Intercalated Games

Great Britain, or in full Great Britain and Northern Ireland, the team of the British Olympic Association (BOA), which represents the United Kingdom, competed at the 2020 Summer Olympics in Tokyo. Originally scheduled to take place from 24 July to 9 August 2020, the Games were postponed to 23 July to 8 August 2021, because of the COVID-19 pandemic.

British athletes have appeared in every Summer Olympic Games of the modern era, alongside those of Australia, France, Greece, and Switzerland, although Great Britain is the only team to have won at least one gold medal at all of them. This streak was maintained in Tokyo when Adam Peaty successfully defended his 100 metre breaststroke title on the third morning of the Games.

The first medals of the Games for Great Britain were won by martial artists with taekwondo-ka Bradly Sinden guaranteeing Team GB at least a silver medal by qualifying for the final of the −68 kg event in taekwondo. Before the final took place, however, judoka Chelsie Giles secured a bronze medal in the 52 kg class via the repechage.

== Summary ==
The 2020 Games saw members of the Great Britain team achieve a number of prominent milestones. In the pool, Adam Peaty became the first British swimmer to successfully defend an Olympic gold medal, winning the 100 metre breaststroke for the second time. The British swimming team also had its most successful Olympics in history winning eight medals (with four golds) eclipsing the previous Olympic swimming best of seven medals (which also included four golds) which had stood since the London 1908 Games (113 years). This included a 1–2 finish in the final of the Men's 200m freestyle for Duncan Scott (who took silver) and Tom Dean (who took gold) which was the first time British swimmers had achieved this in any Olympic swimming event since 1908. Scott also became Britain's most successful athlete in any sport at a single games in terms of number of medals won with four medals in total made up of one gold and three silver medals. However, Adam Peaty, James Guy and Tom Dean were more successful in terms of gold medals winning two golds to Scott's single gold. By winning gold alongside James Guy and Adam Peaty in the mixed 4 × 100 metres medley relay Freya Anderson, Kathleen Dawson and Anna Hopkin became the first British female swimmers since Rebecca Adlington took double individual gold in the 400 metre freestyle and 800m freestyle events at the Beijing 2008 games to win an Olympic gold medal. However, no British female swimmer won a medal in any of the individual women's events making the medals from mixed medley the only ones won by British female swimmers at the Games.

On 4 August Sky Brown became the youngest British Olympian ever to win a medal when she won bronze in the Women's Park Skateboarding at the age of 13 years and 28 days.

Gymnast Max Whitlock also clinched his second consecutive Olympic title on the pommel horse becoming one of the most successful gymnasts ever in the history of that specific apparatus – having also won three World Championship titles in the discipline – and the fourth man in Olympic history to successfully defend their pommel horse title. In doing do he cemented his position as Great Britain's most successful Olympic gymnast with six medals overall including three golds. Bryony Page in the Women's Trampoline competition claimed her second consecutive Olympic medal in the event with a bronze medal having won a silver in Rio. A team containing Jennifer Gadirova, Jessica Gadirova, Alice Kinsella and Amelie Morgan also won a Bronze in the Women's Team Artistic All-Round event. giving the gymnastics squad three medals at Tokyo 2020 overall down from the seven achieved by gymnastics in Rio in 2016.

Keely Hodgkinson and Laura Muir secured silver medals in the Women's 800 metres and 1500 metres respectively. These were the first medals in either of these events for a British athlete since Kelly Holmes won double gold at the Athens 2004 Games. Josh Kerr by winning bronze in the Men's 1500m also became the first British athlete to win an Olympic medal in that event since Seoul 1988 where Peter Elliott won a silver medal. Holly Bradshaw also won her first medal in either Olympic or outdoor World Championship competition with bronze in the women's pole vault. The women's 4 × 100 relay squad also won a bronze.

Despite failing to medal in the men's match sprint Jason Kenny took sole ownership of the record as Great Britain's most successful Olympian, most decorated Olympian and the most successful and most decorated Olympic cyclist of any nation, with silver in the men's team sprint and gold in the men's keirin. This was the fourth consecutive keirin title for Great Britain, and took Kenny's career tally to seven gold and two silver medals and was the fourth consecutive Olympics in which he had won one or more golds. His wife Laura Kenny lost her omnium title after a major crash in the opening scratch race, and only managed a silver medal in the women's team pursuit. However, in the inaugural Olympic women's Madison she and partner Katie Archibald won the event, gaining a lap and winning all but two of the intermediate sprints. This took her career tally to five golds and one silver making her the most decorated British female Olympian, and the most successful and most decorated female Olympic cyclist of any nation. Together the Kennys also became the most successful married Olympians in history where both partners have won a gold medal. Britain's other track cycling gold came courtesy of Matt Walls in the men's omnium- the first time a male British Olympic cyclist has won the Olympic title in that event. Walls also won a silver medal alongside Ethan Hayter in the men's Madison event.

On the waves, Giles Scott secured Great Britain's sixth consecutive gold medal in sailing's Finn class which was making its final Olympic appearance, while Hannah Mills became Great Britain's most successful female Olympic sailor defending her Women's 470 title with Eilidh McIntyre having won the same class with Saskia Clark in 2016. McIntyre was emulating her father Michael who had won gold in the Star class alongside Bryn Vaile at the 1988 Games in Seoul.

On a less positive note a number of iconic 'streaks' of British success were broken. The men's team pursuit title left British hands for the first time since 2004, as did the men's team sprint with both Ed Clancy and Jason Kenny denied fourth consecutive gold medals in the same event. The men's match sprint in cycling also left British hands for the first time since 2004, although Jack Carlin won a bronze medal. The men's coxless four lost the Olympic title for the first time since 1996, while the rowing team – having won the only British gold medal as part of the disastrous 1996 British Olympic team, and thus maintained Great Britain's streak of at least one gold medal in every Summer Games – won no gold medals for the first time since 1980 winning only 2 medals in total across the whole Olympic rowing regatta.

Despite winning five medals in total, these Olympics were the first time since 1996 that Great Britain's athletics team failed to win a gold medal. This was partly due to unfortunately timed injuries to reigning world champions Dina Asher-Smith (200 metres) and Katarina Johnson-Thompson (Heptathlon) who were seen as Britain's best medal hopes in the athletics events. The men's 4 × 100 metres relay squad were also pipped to gold by Italy by 0.01 seconds on the finish line having been leading going into the anchor leg. However, it subsequently emerged the British quartet could lose their silver medals after a member of the quartet CJ Ujah was revealed on 12 August 2021 to have failed a drugs test with Ujah provisionally suspended by the Athletics Integrity Unit following the games pending further investigation . The matter was referred to the Court of Arbitration For Sport Anti-Doping Division to decide if the British 4 × 100 male quartet should be disqualified from the final results. On 18 February 2022, it was confirmed the British Mens 4 × 100 metres athletics relay quartet would be stripped of their silver medals meaning Great Britains final medal tally from the game is 64 – one less than achieved at the London 2012 Olympics. Three medals across the four middle-distance events, a long hoped-for global medal for Holly Bradshaw in pole vault and a bronze medal for the women's sprint relay team ensured the British athletics team did not leave Tokyo empty handed.

A number of British defending champions from 2016 (including some 'double' champions who won gold medals in 2012 and 2016) either were not selected, or were unable to retain their titles, including Mo Farah, Alistair Brownlee, Jade Jones, Charlotte Dujardin and Andy Murray. In comparison, three former multiple world champions, but long time 'nearly men' on the Olympic stage finally reached the top step of the rostrum, Jonathan Brownlee winning the inaugural triathlon mixed relay, James Guy in both the men's 4 × 200 metre freestyle relay and the mixed medley relay, and Tom Daley, winning gold in the men's 10 metre synchro with debutant Matty Lee, before his bronze in the individual event made him the first British diver to win four career Olympic medals.

Great Britain had some notable success in new sports and events, winning the inaugural gold medals for women's BMX freestyle, mixed 4 × 100 metre medley swimming relay (in a new world record), women's madison and the triathlon mixed team relay, and medals in men's BMX freestyle, women's skateboarding and women's featherweight boxing. The women's +87 kg weightlifting event was technically a new event, but was in reality simply an adjusted version of the existing super-heavyweight class. Nonetheless, Emily Campbell's silver medal was the first ever won in weightlifting by a British woman, the first British weightlifting medal for either sex since 1984 and the first at a non-boycotted Games since Louis Martin medalled in consecutive Olympics in 1960 and 1964. Indeed, the weightlifting event at the Games was a significant success for Great Britain, with top-seven finishes for all four selected lifters, and Sarah Davies coming agonisingly close to winning a second silver medal in the −64 kg class.

Great Britain also had great success in both of the men's and women's modern pentathlon events with Kate French taking gold in the women's event, while Joseph Choong became the first British male modern pentathlete to win an individual medal when taking gold in the men's event. The victories of French and Choong marked the first time since the introduction of the women's event in 2000 that a 'double' had been achieved, with the same nation winning both men's and women's events.

== Medallists ==
Medal	Name	Sport	Event	Date
Gold	Tom Pidcock	Cycling	Men's cross-country	26 July
Gold	Tom Daley; Matty Lee	Diving	Men's synchronized 10 metre platform	26 July
Gold	Adam Peaty	Swimming	Men's 100 m breaststroke	26 July
Gold	Tom Dean	Swimming	Men's 200 m freestyle	27 July
Gold	Tom Dean; James Guy; Calum Jarvis^{[b]} Matt Richards; Duncan Scott	Swimming	Men's 4 × 200 m freestyle relay	28 July
Gold	Beth Shriever	Cycling	Women's BMX racing	30 July
Gold	Jess Learmonth; Jonathan Brownlee; Georgia Taylor-Brown; Alex Yee	Triathlon	Mixed relay	31 July
Gold	Freya Anderson ^{[b]} Kathleen Dawson; James Guy; Adam Peaty; Anna Hopkin	Swimming	Mixed 4 × 100 m medley relay	31 July
Gold	Charlotte Worthington	Cycling	Women's BMX freestyle	1 August
Gold	Max Whitlock	Gymnastics	Men's pommel horse	1 August
Gold	Laura Collett; Tom McEwen; Oliver Townend	Equestrian	Team eventing	2 August
Gold	Stuart Bithell; Dylan Fletcher	Sailing	49er	3 August
Gold	Giles Scott	Sailing	Finn	3 August
Gold	Hannah Mills; Eilidh McIntyre	Sailing	Women's 470	4 August
Gold	Ben Maher	Equestrian	Individual jumping	4 August
Gold	Matthew Walls	Cycling	Men's omnium	5 August
Gold	Katie Archibald; Laura Kenny	Cycling	Women's Madison	6 August
Gold	Kate French	Modern pentathlon	Women's individual	6 August
Gold	Galal Yafai	Boxing	Men's flyweight	7 August
Gold	Joe Choong	Modern pentathlon	Men's Individual	7 August
Gold	Jason Kenny	Cycling	Men's keirin	8 August
Gold	Lauren Price	Boxing	Women's middleweight	8 August
Silver	Bradly Sinden	Taekwondo	Men's −68 kg	25 July
Silver	Lauren Williams	Taekwondo	Women's −67 kg	26 July
Silver	Alex Yee	Triathlon	Men's individual	26 July
Silver	Duncan Scott	Swimming	Men's 200 m freestyle	27 July
Silver	Georgia Taylor-Brown	Triathlon	Women's individual	27 July
Silver	Tom Barras; Jack Beaumont; Angus Groom; Harry Leask	Rowing	Men's quadruple sculls	28 July
Silver	Mallory Franklin	Canoeing	Women's C-1	29 July
Silver	Duncan Scott	Swimming	Men's 200 metre individual medley	30 July
Silver	Kye Whyte	Cycling	Men's BMX racing	30 July
Silver	Luke Greenbank; James Guy; Duncan Scott; Adam Peaty; James Wilby^{[b]}	Swimming	Men's 4 × 100 m medley relay	1 August
Silver	Tom McEwen	Equestrian	Individual eventing	2 August
Silver	Emily Campbell	Weightlifting	Women's +87 kg	2 August
Silver	John Gimson; Anna Burnet	Sailing	Mixed nacra 17	3 August
Silver	Katie Archibald; Elinor Barker; Neah Evans; Laura Kenny; Josie Knight	Cycling	Woman's team pursuit	3 August
Silver	Jack Carlin; Jason Kenny; Ryan Owens	Cycling	Men's team sprint	3 August
Silver	Pat McCormack	Boxing	Men's welterweight	3 August
Silver	Keely Hodgkinson	Athletics	Women's 800 metres	3 August
Silver	Benjamin Whittaker	Boxing	Men's light heavyweight	4 August
Silver	Laura Muir	Athletics	Women's 1500 metres	6 August
Silver	Ethan Hayter; Matthew Walls	Cycling	Men's Madison	7 August
Bronze	Chelsie Giles	Judo	Women's 52 kg	25 July
Bronze	Bianca Walkden	Taekwondo	Women's +67 kg	27 July
Bronze	Jennifer Gadirova; Jessica Gadirova; Alice Kinsella; Amelie Morgan	Gymnastics	Women's artistic team all-around	27 July
Bronze	Charlotte Dujardin; Charlotte Fry; Carl Hester	Equestrian	Team dressage	27 July
Bronze	Charlotte Dujardin	Equestrian	Individual dressage	28 July
Bronze	Matthew Coward-Holley	Shooting	Men's trap	29 July
Bronze	Josh Bugajski; Jacob Dawson; Charles Elwes; Thomas Ford; Thomas George; James Rudkin; Moe Sbihi; Oliver Wynne-Griffith; Henry Fieldman (cox)	Rowing	Men's eight	30 July
Bronze	Luke Greenbank	Swimming	Men's 200 m backstroke	30 July
Bronze	Bryony Page	Gymnastics	Women's trampoline	30 July
Bronze	Emma Wilson	Sailing	Women's RS:X	31 July
Bronze	Karriss Artingstall	Boxing	Women's featherweight	31 July
Bronze	Declan Brooks	Cycling	Men's BMX freestyle	1 August
Bronze	Jack Laugher	Diving	Men's 3 m springboard	3 August
Bronze	Sky Brown	Skateboarding	Women's park	4 August
Bronze	Frazer Clarke	Boxing	Men's super heavyweight	4 August
Bronze	Liam Heath	Canoeing	Men's K1 200 metres	5 August
Bronze	Holly Bradshaw	Athletics	Women's pole vault	5 August
Bronze	Great Britain women's national field hockey team: Maddie Hinch; Anna Toman; Leah Wilkinson; Giselle Ansley; Hollie Pearne-Webb; Grace Balsdon; Laura Unsworth; Sarah Jones; Susannah Townsend; Fiona Crackles; Shona McCallin; Hannah Martin; Sarah Robertson; Ellie Rayer; Izzy Petter; Lily Owsley	Field hockey	Women's tournament	6 August
Bronze	Jack Carlin	Cycling	Men's sprint	6 August
Bronze	Asha Philip; Imani Lansiquot; Dina Asher-Smith; Daryll Neita	Athletics	Women's 4 × 100 metres relay	6 August
Bronze	Tom Daley	Diving	Men's 10 metre platform	7 August
Bronze	Josh Kerr	Athletics	Men's 1500 metres	7 August

Medals by sport
Sport	1st place, gold medalist(s)	2nd place, silver medalist(s)	3rd place, bronze medalist(s)	Total
Cycling	6	4	2	12
Swimming	4	3	1	8
Sailing	3	1	1	5
Boxing	2	2	2	6
Equestrian	2	1	2	5
Modern pentathlon	2	0	0	2
Triathlon	1	2	0	3
Diving	1	0	2	3
Gymnastics	1	0	2	3
Athletics	0	2	3	5
Taekwondo	0	2	1	3
Canoeing	0	1	1	2
Rowing	0	1	1	2
Weightlifting	0	1	0	1
Field hockey	0	0	1	1
Judo	0	0	1	1
Shooting	0	0	1	1
Skateboarding	0	0	1	1
Total	22	20	22	64

Medals by date
Day	Date	1st place, gold medalist(s)	2nd place, silver medalist(s)	3rd place, bronze medalist(s)	Total
1	24 Jul	0	0	0	0
2	25 Jul	0	1	1	2
3	26 Jul	3	2	0	5
4	27 Jul	1	2	3	6
5	28 Jul	1	1	1	3
6	29 Jul	0	1	1	2
7	30 Jul	1	2	3	6
8	31 Jul	2	0	2	4
9	1 Aug	2	1	1	4
10	2 Aug	1	2	0	3
11	3 Aug	2	5	1	8
12	4 Aug	2	1	2	5
13	5 Aug	1	0	2	3
14	6 Aug	2	1	3	6
15	7 Aug	2	1	2	5
16	8 Aug	2	0	0	2
Total		22	20	22	64

=== Multiple medallists ===
The following Team GB competitors won multiple medals at the 2020 Olympic Games.

Charlotte Dujardin's two bronze medals added to her two golds from London 2012 and her gold and silver from Rio 2016 made her the first female British athlete to win six Olympic medals, a feat later equalled by Laura Kenny. Dujardin also became the first female British athlete to win multiple medals at three consecutive Games (two in London, two in Rio and two in Tokyo), a feat which was again equalled by Kenny. Two medals for Jason Kenny made him the first British athlete of either sex to win multiple medals at four successive games (2 in 2008, 2 in 2012, 3 in 2016 and 2 in 2020), a feat also unequalled by anyone in the Olympic sport of cycling. With silver in the Men's 4 × 100 m medley relay, Duncan Scott becomes the first British Olympian to win four medals in a single Games.

Name	Medal	Sport	Event
Adam Peaty	Gold; Gold; Silver	Swimming	Men's 100 m breaststroke Mixed 4 × 100 m medley relay Men's 4 × 100 m medley relay
James Guy	Gold; Gold; Silver	Swimming	Men's 4 × 200 m freestyle relay Mixed 4 × 100 m medley relay Men's 4 × 100 m medley relay
Tom Dean	Gold; Gold	Swimming	Men's 200 m freestyle Men's 4 × 200 m freestyle relay
Duncan Scott	Gold; Silver; Silver; Silver	Swimming	Men's 4 × 200 m freestyle relay Men's 200 m freestyle Men's 200 metre individual medley Men's 4 × 100 m medley relay*
Georgia Taylor-Brown	Gold; Silver	Triathlon	Mixed relay Women's individual
Alex Yee	Gold; Silver	Triathlon	Mixed relay Men's individual
Tom McEwen	Gold; Silver	Equestrian	Team eventing Individual eventing
Laura Kenny	Gold; Silver	Cycling	Women's Madison; Women's team pursuit
Jason Kenny	Gold; Silver	Cycling	Men's keirin Men's team sprint
Katie Archibald	Gold; Silver	Cycling	Women's Madison; Women's team pursuit
Matthew Walls	Gold; Silver	Cycling	Men's omnium Men's Madison
Tom Daley	Gold; Bronze	Diving	Men's synchronized 10 metre platform Men's 10 metre platform
Jack Carlin	Silver; Bronze	Cycling	Men's team sprint Men's sprint
Luke Greenbank	Silver; Bronze	Swimming	Men's 4 × 100 m medley relay Men's 200 m backstroke
Charlotte Dujardin	Bronze; Bronze	Equestrian	Team dressage Individual dressage

== Administration ==
On 9 April 2018, the British Olympic Association announced that Mark England would be their Chef de Mission in Tokyo following his success in this role at Rio 2016. Under his leadership Team GB had become the first nation to increase its medal haul at the summer games after acting as host at London 2012.

== Medal targets ==
On 9 July 2021, UK Sport announced they had set a medal target of 45–70 medals for the team. No individual targets have been set for each sport as it was considered impossible to properly evaluate the position of each sport in the context of the coronavirus pandemic, and the large scale disruption to both training and sports events that entailed.

Team GB medal target
Event	Medal target	2012 medals	2016 medals	Medals won	Target met
Overall	45–70	65	67	64	check

== Competitors ==
The team included nine sets of siblings: Tom and Emily Ford (Rowing), Jennifer and Jessica Gadirova (Gymnastics), Charlotte and Mathilda Hodgkins-Byrne (Rowing), Joe and Max Litchfield (Swimming), Luke and Pat McCormack (Boxing), Andy and Jamie Murray (Tennis), Tiffany Porter and Cindy Sember (Athletics), Hannah and Jodie Williams (Athletics), and Adam and Simon Yates (Cycling). The Gadirovas, McCormacks and Yateses are all twins. In addition, Hannah Martin was a member of the women's hockey team while her brother Harry Martin, a two time Olympian, was a travelling reserve for the men's team. There was also one married couple in multi gold medallists: Jason and Laura Kenny (Cycling).

Dressage rider Carl Hester was competing at his sixth Olympic Games. Only fellow equestrian rider Nick Skelton has represented Great Britain at more Games with seven appearances. Meanwhile, archer Naomi Folkard was making her fifth consecutive appearance. Among British female athletes only six time Olympians Tessa Sanderson and Alison Williamson have competed at more Games.

Sport	Men	Women	Total
Archery	3	3	6
Artistic swimming	—N/a	2	2
Athletics	37	40	77
Badminton	4	3	7
Boxing	7	4	11
Canoeing	3	5	8
Cycling	15	11	26
Diving	6	6	12
Equestrian	5	4	9
Fencing	1	0	1
Field hockey	16	16	32
Football	0	18	18
Golf	2	2	4
Gymnastics	4	6	10
Judo	1	5	6
Modern pentathlon	2	2	4
Rowing	19	22	41
Rugby sevens	12	12	24
Sailing	8	7	15
Shooting	2	3	5
Skateboarding	0	2	2
Sport climbing	0	1	1
Swimming	18	14	32
Table tennis	2	1	3
Taekwondo	2	3	5
Tennis	5	1	6
Triathlon	2	3	5
Weightlifting	0	4	4
Total	176	200	376

In addition to the 376 strong British delegation Team GB confirmed the selection of 22 travelling reserves for various sports. These included the reserves for football, hockey and rugby 7s. On 3 July 2021, the IOC, having consulted with the individual federations of these three sports together with those of handball and water polo, announced that each team would be able to select their teams from both the original squads and the travelling reserves without the need to permanently replace one individual with another. This effectively increased the size of the squads from 18 to 22 for football, 16 to 18 for hockey and 12 to 13 for rugby 7s.

== Archery ==
British archers qualified each for the men's and women's events by reaching the quarterfinal stage of their respective team recurves at the 2019 World Archery Championships in 's-Hertogenbosch, Netherlands. The rules of qualification also stipulate that a nation that qualifies at least one male and one female archer, as Great Britain have done, is automatically entered in the mixed team event. On 21 April 2021, Team GB announced the selection of the six archers who will represent the team in Tokyo.

Men

Athlete	Event	Ranking round		Round of 64	Round of 32	Round of 16	Quarterfinals	Semifinals	Final / BM	
Athlete	Event	Score	Seed	Opposition Score	Opposition Score	Opposition Score	Opposition Score	Opposition Score	Opposition Score	Rank
Tom Hall	Individual	649	48	Shana (BAN); L 3–7	Did not advance					
Patrick Huston	Individual	658	25	D'Almeida (BRA); L 1–7	Did not advance					
James Woodgate	Individual	652	38	Abdullin (KAZ); L 3–7	Did not advance					
Tom Hall; Patrick Huston; James Woodgate	Team	1959	10	—N/a		Indonesia; W 6–0	Netherlands; L 3–5	Did not advance		

Women

Athlete	Event	Ranking round		Round of 64	Round of 32	Round of 16	Quarterfinal	Semifinal	Final / BM	
Athlete	Event	Score	Seed	Opposition Score	Opposition Score	Opposition Score	Opposition Score	Opposition Score	Opposition Score	Rank
Sarah Bettles	Individual	653	15	Acosta Giraldo (COL); W 6–4	Wu Jx (CHN); L 2–6	Did not advance				
Naomi Folkard	Individual	629	47	Wu Jx (CHN); L 2–6	Did not advance					
Bryony Pitman	Individual	634	38	Tan Y-t (TPE); W 6–4	Román (MEX); W 6–2	Osipova (ROC); L 0–6	Did not advance			
Sarah Bettles; Naomi Folkard; Bryony Pitman	Team	1916	9	—N/a		Italy; L 3–5	Did not advance			

Mixed

Athlete	Event	Ranking round		Round of 16	Quarterfinal	Semifinal	Final / BM	
Athlete	Event	Score	Seed	Opposition Score	Opposition Score	Opposition Score	Opposition Score	Rank
Patrick Huston; Sarah Bettles	Team	1311	12 Q	China; W 5–3	Mexico; L 0–6	Did not advance		

== Artistic swimming ==
Great Britain qualified two athletes to the artistic swimming duet competition as a result of Spain's success in the final Artistic Swimming Olympic Team Qualification competition event on 11 June 2021. Spain's elevation to the team event freed a quota place in the 2019 European Champions Cup competition inherited by Great Britain. This slot was then superseded by the top seven finish achieved by Great Britain itself at the final FINA Artistic Swimming Olympic Qualification Tournament. On 22 June 2021, Team GB announced the selection of Kate Shortman and Isabelle Thorpe for Tokyo.

Athlete	Event	Technical routine		Free routine (preliminary)			Free routine (final)		
Athlete	Event	Points	Rank	Points	Total (technical + free)	Rank	Points	Total (technical + free)	Rank
Kate Shortman; Isabelle Thorpe	Duet	85.1548	14	84.7333	169.8881	14	Did not advance		

== Athletics ==
British athletes achieved the entry standards, either by qualifying time or by world ranking, in several track and field events (up to a maximum of 3 athletes in each event): The team will be selected based on the results of the 2021 British Athletics Championships ( 25 to 27 June) to be held in Manchester, England. Relay qualification is achieved by a top eight finish at the 2019 World Athletics Championships in a relay event, or a top eight ranking in that event not including previously qualified nations. The first confirmed place was therefore assured when Great Britain finished fourth in the mixed 4 × 400 metres relay event at the Worlds in Doha. Great Britain secured top eight finishes, and therefore Olympic qualification, in the other four relay events in Doha on 5 and 6 October – along with the United States, they were the only teams to gain Olympic places in all five relay events at Doha.

In December 2019, UK Athletics confirmed the preselection of Callum Hawkins for the men's marathon. On 26 March 2021, at the 2021 British Athletics Marathon and 20km Walk Trial in Kew Gardens, Chris Thompson, Ben Connor, Stephanie Davis and Tom Bosworth confirmed qualification for Tokyo with a top two finish in their respective races, having already gained the qualification time. On 1 April 2021, Team GB announced the selection of these five athletes together with marathon runners Jess Piasecki and Steph Twell for Tokyo. On 4 June 2021, World Athletics confirmed that Cameron Corbishley and Dominic King had qualified by World Rankings for the Men's 50 km walk event. However, they have not met the qualification time requirements set out in British Athletics selection policy document and it remains to be seen whether they will be selected on the basis of future potential.

On 29 June 2021, Team GB announced the selection of a further 65 athletes following the completion of the British trials. The squad of 72 includes reigning world champions Dina Asher-Smith and Katarina Johnson-Thompson subject to the latter proving her fitness. On 2 July 2021, the final four athletes were confirmed by Team GB resulting in a 76 strong squad for Tokyo. Laura Muir later withdrew from the women's 800 m to concentrate on the 1500 m and her place was taken by Alexandra Bell increasing the final squad to 77.

Key

- Note–Ranks given for track events are within the athlete's heat only
- Q = Qualified for the next round
- q = Qualified for the next round as a fastest loser or, in field events, by position without achieving the qualifying target
- NR = National record
- N/A = Round not applicable for the event
- Bye = Athlete not required to compete in round

Track & road events
Men

Athlete	Event	Heat		Quarterfinal		Semifinal		Final	
Athlete	Event	Time	Rank	Time	Rank	Time	Rank	Time	Rank
Zharnel Hughes	100 m	Bye		10.04	3 Q	9.98	1 Q	DSQ	
Reece Prescod	100 m	Bye		10.12	5 q	DSQ		Did not advance	
Chijindu Ujah	100 m	Bye		10.08	3 Q	10.11	5	Did not advance	
Adam Gemili	200 m	1:58.58	7	—N/a		Did not advance			
Nethaneel Mitchell-Blake	200 m	20.56	5	—N/a		Did not advance			
Oliver Dustin	800 m	1:46.94	6	—N/a		Did not advance			
Elliot Giles	800 m	1:44.49	3 Q	—N/a		1:44.75	3	Did not advance	
Daniel Rowden	800 m	1:45.73	2 Q	—N/a		1:44.38	5	Did not advance	
Jake Heyward	1500 m	3:36.14	1 Q	—N/a		3:32.82	6 q	3:34.43	9
Josh Kerr	1500 m	3:36.29	7 q	—N/a		3:32.18	3 Q	3:29.05	3rd place, bronze medalist(s)
Jake Wightman	1500 m	3:41.18	3 Q	—N/a		3:33.48	1 Q	3:35.09	10
Andrew Butchart	5000 m	13:31.27	7 q	—N/a				13:09.97	11
Marc Scott	5000 m	13:39.61	6	—N/a				Did not advance	
Sam Atkin	10000 m	—N/a						DNF	
Marc Scott	10000 m	—N/a						28:09.23	14
David King	110 m hurdles	13.55	6 q	—N/a		13.67	7	Did not advance	
Andrew Pozzi	110 m hurdles	13.50	4 Q	—N/a		13.32	4 q	13.30	7
Phil Norman	3000 m steeplechase	8:46.57	13	—N/a				Did not advance	
Zak Seddon	3000 m steeplechase	8:43.29	14	—N/a				Did not advance	
Zharnel Hughes; Richard Kilty; Nethaneel Mitchell-Blake; Chijindu Ujah	4 × 100 m relay	38.02	2 Q	—N/a				~~37.51~~	DSQ
Joe Brier; Cameron Chalmers; Michael Ohioze; Lee Thompson	4 × 400 m relay	3:03.29	6	—N/a				Did not advance	
Ben Connor	Marathon	—N/a						DNF	
Callum Hawkins	Marathon	—N/a						DNF	
Chris Thompson	Marathon	—N/a						2:21.29	54
Tom Bosworth	20 km walk	—N/a						1:25:57	25
Callum Wilkinson	20 km walk	—N/a						1:22:38	10

Women

Athlete	Event	Heat		Quarterfinal		Semifinal		Final	
Athlete	Event	Time	Rank	Time	Rank	Time	Rank	Time	Rank
Dina Asher-Smith	100 m	Bye		11.07	2 Q	11.05	3	Did not advance	
Daryll Neita	100 m	Bye		10.98 PB	2 Q	11.00	4 q	11.12	8
Asha Philip	100 m	Bye		11.31	2 Q	11.30	8	Did not advance	
Beth Dobbin	200 m	22.78 =SB	2 Q	—N/a		22.85	5	Did not advance	
Ama Pipi	400 m	51.17	4 q	—N/a		51.59	7	Did not advance	
Jodie Williams	400 m	50.99	1 Q	—N/a		49.97	2 Q	49.97	6
Nicole Yeargin	400 m	DSQ		—N/a		Did not advance			
Alexandra Bell	800 m	2:00.96	4 q	—N/a		1:58.83	3 q	1:57.66	7
Keely Hodgkinson	800 m	2:01.59	2 Q	—N/a		1:59.12	1 Q	1:55.88 NR	2nd place, silver medalist(s)
Jemma Reekie	800 m	1:59.97	1 Q	—N/a		1:59.77	2 Q	1:56.90	4
Laura Muir	1500 m	4:03.89	2 Q	—N/a		4:00.73	2 Q	3.54.50 NR	2nd place, silver medalist(s)
Katie Snowden	1500 m	4:02.77	6 Q	—N/a		4:02.93	9	Did not advance	
Revée Walcott-Nolan	1500 m	4:06.23	7	—N/a		Did not advance			
Jessica Judd	5000 m	15:06.47	13	—N/a				Did not advance	
Eilish McColgan	5000 m	15:09.68	10	—N/a				Did not advance	
Amy-Eloise Markovc	5000 m	15:03.22	9	—N/a				Did not advance	
Jessica Judd	10000 m	—N/a						31:56.80	17
Eilish McColgan	10000 m	—N/a						31:04.46	9
Tiffany Porter	100 m hurdles	12.85	4 Q	—N/a		12.86	5	Did not advance	
Cindy Sember	100 m hurdles	13.00	4 Q	—N/a		12.76	7	Did not advance	
Meghan Beesley	400 m hurdles	55.91	7	—N/a		Did not advance			
Jessie Knight	400 m hurdles	DNF		—N/a		Did not advance			
Jessica Turner	400 m hurdles	56.83	4 Q	—N/a		1:00.36	7	Did not advance	
Elizabeth Bird	3000 m steeplechase	9:24.34	5 q	—N/a				9:19.68 NR	9
Aimee Pratt	3000 m steeplechase	9:47.56	11	—N/a				Did not advance	
Dina Asher-Smith; Imani-Lara Lansiquot; Daryll Neita; Asha Philip	4 × 100 m relay	41.55 NR	1 Q	—N/a				41.88	3rd place, bronze medalist(s)
Zoey Clark^{[a]} Emily Diamond; Laviai Nielsen^{[a]} Ama Pipi; Jodie Williams; Nicole Yeargin	4 × 400 m relay	3:23.99	3 Q	—N/a				3:22.59	5
Stephanie Davis	Marathon	Not held						2:36:33	39
Jess Piasecki	Marathon	Not held						2:55:39	71
Steph Twell	Marathon	Not held						2:53:26	68

Mixed

Athlete	Event	Heat		Final	
Athlete	Event	Result	Rank	Result	Rank
Niclas Baker; Cameron Chalmers; Zoey Clark^{[a]} Emily Diamond; Lee Thompson^{[a]} Nicole Yeargin	4 × 400 m relay	3:11.95	4 q	3:12.07	6

Field events
Men

Athlete	Event	Qualification		Final	
Athlete	Event	Result	Rank	Result	Rank
Ben Williams	Triple jump	16.30	22	Did not advance	
Tom Gale	High jump	2.28	13 q	2.27	11
Harry Coppell	Pole vault	5.65	=12 q	5.80	7
Scott Lincoln	Shot put	20.42	18	Did not advance	
Lawrence Okoye	Discus throw	NM	—	Did not advance	
Taylor Campbell	Hammer throw	71.34	28	Did not advance	
Nick Miller	Hammer throw	76.93	3 Q	78.15	6

Women

Athlete	Event	Qualification		Final	
Athlete	Event	Result	Rank	Result	Rank
Abigail Irozuru	Long jump	6.75	4 Q	6.51	11
Jazmin Sawyers	Long jump	6.62	11 q	6.80	8
Lorraine Ugen	Long jump	6.05	15	Did not advance	
Emily Borthwick	High jump	1.93	=16	Did not advance	
Morgan Lake	High jump	1.95	7 Q	DNS	
Holly Bradshaw	Pole vault	4.55	=1 q	4.85	3rd place, bronze medalist(s)
Sophie McKinna	Shot put	17.81	18	Did not advance	

Combined events – Women's heptathlon

Athlete	Event	100H	HJ	SP	200 m	LJ	JT	800 m	Final	Rank
Katarina Johnson-Thompson	Result	13.27	1.86	13.31	DSQ	DNS	—	—	DNF	
Katarina Johnson-Thompson	Points	1084	1054	748	0	0	—	—	DNF	

^{a} Ran in the heats only.

== Badminton ==
Great Britain entered badminton players for each of the following events into the Olympic tournament based on the BWF World Race to Tokyo Rankings of 15 June 2021: one entry each in the men's and women's singles and a pair in the men's, women's, and mixed doubles. On 28 June 2021, Team GB announced the squad of seven players who will represent the team in Tokyo. Ben Lane and Sean Vendy were selected to compete in the men's doubles even though Rio 2016 bronze medallists Marcus Ellis and Chris Langridge finished ahead of them in the rankings.

Athlete	Event	Group Stage				Elimination	Quarterfinal	Semifinal	Final / BM	
Athlete	Event	Opposition Score	Opposition Score	Opposition Score	Rank	Opposition Score	Opposition Score	Opposition Score	Opposition Score	Rank
Toby Penty	Men's singles	Schäfer (GER); W (21–18, 21–11)	Wangcharoen (THA); W (21–19, 21–12)	—N/a	1 Q	Antonsen (DEN); L (10–21, 15–21)	Did not advance			
Ben Lane; Sean Vendy	Men's doubles	Gideon / Sukamuljo (INA); L (15–21, 11–21)	Lee Y / Wang C-l (TPE); L (17–21, 14–21)	Rankireddy / Shetty (IND); L (17–21, 19–21)	4	—N/a	Did not advance			
Kirsty Gilmour	Women's singles	Shahzad (PAK); W (21–14, 21–14)	Yamaguchi (JPN); L (9–21, 18–21)	—N/a	2	Did not advance				
Chloe Birch; Lauren Smith	Women's doubles	Fukushima / Hirota (JPN); L (13–21, 14–21)	Polii / Rahayu (INA); L (11–21, 13–21)	Chow M K / Lee M Y (MAS); L (19–21, 16–21)	4	—N/a	Did not advance			
Marcus Ellis; Lauren Smith	Mixed doubles	Gicquel / Delrue (FRA); W (21–18, 21–17)	Hurlburt-Yu / Wu (CAN); W (21–13, 21–19)	Puavaranukroh / Taerattanachai (THA); W (21–12, 21–19)	1 Q	—N/a	Tse Y S / Tang C M (HKG); L (13–21, 18–21)	Did not advance		

== Boxing ==
Great Britain entered eleven boxers (seven men and four women) to compete for each of the following weight classes into the Olympic tournament. Rio 2016 Olympian and 2018 Commonwealth Games champion Galal Yafai (men's flyweight) and 2019 world bronze medallist Peter McGrail (men's featherweight) were the first boxers to secure their spots on the British squad by winning the round of 16 match of their respective weight divisions at the 2020 European Qualification Tournament in London. After being suspended due to the COVID-19 pandemic, the qualifying tournament resumed in Villebon-sur-Yvette, France. Nine further boxers secured places in their respective weight divisions, including Rio 2016 Olympian Pat McCormack in the men's welterweight. The final total of eleven qualified boxers is the joint highest (with Uzbekistan and the ROC) of any nation at the 2020 Summer Olympics. On 23 June 2021, Team GB announced the names of the eleven boxers who would represent the team in Tokyo – each place went to the boxer who had obtained the quota place in qualification.

Men

Athlete	Event	Round of 32	Round of 16	Quarterfinals	Semifinals	Final	
Athlete	Event	Opposition Result	Opposition Result	Opposition Result	Opposition Result	Opposition Result	Rank
Galal Yafai	Flyweight	Soghomonyan (ARM); W RSC	Chinyemba (ZAM); W 3–2	Veitia (CUB); W 4–1	Bibossinov (KAZ); W 3–2	Paalam (PHI); W 4–1	1st place, gold medalist(s)
Peter McGrail	Featherweight	Butdee (THA); L 0–5	Did not advance				17
Luke McCormack	Lightweight	Kaushik (IND); W 4–1	Cruz (CUB); L 0–5	Did not advance			9
Pat McCormack	Welterweight	Bye	Radzionau (BLR); W 5–0	Baturov (UZB); W 4–1	Walsh (IRL); W WO	Iglesias (CUB); L 0–5	2nd place, silver medalist(s)
Benjamin Whittaker	Light heavyweight	Vivas (COL); W 4–1	Oraby (EGY); W 5–0	Machado (BRA); W 3–2	Khataev (ROC); W 4–1	López (CUB); L 1–4	2nd place, silver medalist(s)
Cheavon Clarke	Heavyweight	Bye	Teixeira (BRA); L 1–4	Did not advance			9
Frazer Clarke	Super heavyweight	Bye	Rogava (UKR); W 4–1	Aliev (FRA); W DSQ	Jalolov (UZB); L RSC–I	Did not advance	3rd place, bronze medalist(s)

Women

Athlete	Event	Round of 32	Round of 16	Quarterfinals	Semifinals	Final	
Athlete	Event	Opposition Result	Opposition Result	Opposition Result	Opposition Result	Opposition Result	Rank
Charley Davison	Flyweight	Cheddar (MAR); W 5–0	Chang Y (CHN); L 0–5	Did not advance			9
Karriss Artingstall	Featherweight	Kenosi (BOT); W 5–0	Romeu (BRA); W 5–0	Nicolson (AUS); W 3–2	Irie (JPN); L 2–3	Did not advance	3rd place, bronze medalist(s)
Caroline Dubois	Lightweight	Sadiku (KOS); W 5–0	Ellis (USA); W 3–0	Seesondee (THA); L 2–3	Did not advance		5
Lauren Price	Middleweight	—N/a	Mönkhbat (MGL); W 5–0	Bylon (PAN); W 5–0	Fontijn (NED); W 3–2	Li Q (CHN); W 5–0	1st place, gold medalist(s)

== Canoeing ==
=== Slalom ===
British canoeists qualified boats in all four classes for the Games through the 2019 ICF Canoe Slalom World Championships in La Seu d'Urgell, Spain. On 10 October 2019, Team GB announced the names of the slalom canoeists selected for the Games, as a result of their performances at three selection meets: the British Senior and Olympic Trials, the 2019 ICF World Cup series in Lee Valley Park, and the World Championships.

Athlete	Event	Preliminary						Semifinal		Final	
Athlete	Event	Run 1	Rank	Run 2	Rank	Best	Rank	Time	Rank	Time	Rank
Adam Burgess	Men's C-1	99.82	4	99.64	2	99.64	3 Q	106.18	8 Q	103.86	4
Bradley Forbes-Cryans	Men's K-1	93.65	5	101.46	21	93.65	13 Q	96.48	5 Q	100.58	6
Mallory Franklin	Women's C-1	107.51	1	105.06	1	105.06	1 Q	117.75	6 Q	108.68	2nd place, silver medalist(s)
Kimberley Woods	Women's K-1	109.63	8	107.82	8	107.82	9 Q	109.00	6 Q	177.09	10

=== Sprint ===
Great Britain qualified a single boat in the men's K-1 200 m with a gold-medal victory at the 2019 ICF Canoe Sprint World Championships in Szeged, Hungary. On 10 October 2019, reigning Olympic champion Liam Heath headed the list of canoeists being selected for the Games. Following the re-allocation of quota places gained at the World Championships and in subsequent competitions, Great Britain secured a place in the women's K-1 500 m. On 30 June 2021, Team GB announced the selection of the remaining members of their sprint canoe squad for Tokyo. On 8 July 2021, it was confirmed that Team GB had been reallocated a quota in the women's C-1 200 m and that Katie Reid would join the British canoe sprint squad in Tokyo.

Athlete	Event	Heats		Quarterfinals		Semifinals		Final	
Athlete	Event	Time	Rank	Time	Rank	Time	Rank	Time	Rank
Liam Heath	Men's K-1 200 m	34.582	3 QF	33.985	1 SF	35.108	2 FA	35.202	3rd place, bronze medalist(s)
Katie Reid	Women's C-1 200 m	47.876	4 QF	47.821	4	Did not advance			
Emily Lewis	Women's K-1 200 m	42.038	4 QF	42.945	3	Did not advance			
Emily Lewis	Women's K-1 500 m	1:55.743	7 QF	1:51.996	4	Did not advance			
Deborah Kerr	Women's K-1 200 m	41.168	3 QF	42.742	1 SF	39.751	2 FA	40.409	8
Deborah Kerr	Women's K-1 500 m	1:51.375	5 QF	1:50.133	3 SF	1:55.955	7	Did not advance	

Qualification Legend: FA = Qualify to final (medal); FB = Qualify to final B (non-medal)

== Cycling ==
On 21 June 2021, Team GB announced the selection of their cycling squad for Tokyo. Notable inclusions were multiple gold medallists Geraint Thomas, Ed Clancy, and Jason and Laura Kenny. For the fourth Olympics in a row, Great Britain topped the medal table in cycling.

=== Road ===
Great Britain entered a squad of six riders (four men and two women) to compete in their respective Olympic road races, by virtue of their respective positions in the UCI World Ranking for nations as at 22 October 2019. Included were three Grand Tour winners, Geraint Thomas (2018 Tour de France), Simon Yates (2018 Vuelta a España) and Tao Geoghegan Hart (2020 Giro d'Italia). Former World Champion and London 2012 silver medallist Lizzie Deignan highlighted the women's team.

Athlete	Event	Time	Rank
Tao Geoghegan Hart	Men's road race	Did not finish	
Geraint Thomas	Men's road race	Did not finish	
Adam Yates	Men's road race	6:06:33	9
Simon Yates	Men's road race	6:09:04	17
Tao Geoghegan Hart	Men's time trial	1:01:44.81	29
Geraint Thomas	Men's time trial	57:46.61	12

Women

Athlete	Event	Time	Rank
Elizabeth Deignan	Women's road race	3:54:31	11
Anna Shackley	Women's road race	Did not finish	
Anna Shackley	Women's time trial	34:13.60	18

- James Knox and Joscelin Lowden were named as travelling reserves.

=== Track ===
Following the completion of the 2020 UCI Track Cycling World Championships, British riders accumulated spots in men's team sprint, men's and women's team pursuit, and men's and women's madison, as well as both the men's and women's omnium. As a result of their place in the men's team sprint, Great Britain won the right to enter two riders in both men's sprint and men's keirin.

Unable to earn a quota place in the women's team sprint, Great Britain won a single quota place in the women's individual sprint through the UCI Olympic rankings. Qualification for the individual sprint means a quota place is also gained in the women's keirin.

Great Britain's most successful male and female Olympians, Jason and Laura Kenny return, along with Ed Clancy. Both Jason Kenny (team sprint) and Clancy (team pursuit) are seeking to set a record for consecutive victories (four) in a single Olympic cycling event. Jason Kenny will also be seeking to gain the outright records for gold medals for a British Olympian, which he currently shares with Chris Hoy and most medals for any Olympic cyclist, currently held by Bradley Wiggins. Laura Kenny will seek to increase her lead as the British female Olympian with the most gold medals, and surpass Charlotte Dujardin as Britain's most decorated female Olympian, and Leontien van Moorsel from the Netherlands as the most successful and most decorated Olympic female cyclist.

Sprint

Athlete	Event	Qualification		Round 1	Repechage 1	Round 2	Repechage 2	Round 3	Repechage 3	Quarterfinals	Semifinals	Final	
Athlete	Event	Time Speed (km/h)	Rank	Opposition Time Speed (km/h)	Opposition Time Speed (km/h)	Opposition Time Speed (km/h)	Opposition Time Speed (km/h)	Opposition Time Speed (km/h)	Opposition Time Speed (km/h)	Opposition Time Speed (km/h)	Opposition Time Speed (km/h)	Opposition Time Speed (km/h)	Rank
Jack Carlin	Men's sprint	9.306; 77.369	3 Q	Hart (AUS); W 9.829; 73.253	Bye	Sahrom (MAS); W 9.884; 72.845	Bye	Vigier (FRA); W 9.963; 72.267	Bye	Levy (GER); W 9.680, W 9.795	Lavreysen (NED); L, L	Dmitriev (ROC); W 9.786, W 9.934	3rd place, bronze medalist(s)
Jason Kenny	Men's sprint	9.510; 75.710	8 Q	Awang (MAS); W 9.791; 73.537	Bye	Wakimoto (JPN); W 9.916; 72.610	Bye	Dmitriev (ROC); L	Awang (MAS); Wakimoto (JPN); W 10.066; 71.528	Lavreysen (NED); L, L	Did not advance	5th place final Levy (GER); Paul (TTO); Vigier (FRA); L	8
Katy Marchant	Women's sprint	10.495; 68.604	8 Q	Kobayashi (JPN); W 11.134; 64.667	Bye	Lee W-s (HKG); W 10.970; 65.634	Bye	Genest (CAN); W 10.935; 65.844	Bye	Lee W-s (HKG); L, L	Did not advance	5th place final Friedrich (GER); Braspennincx (NED); Genest (CAN); L	6

Team sprint

With silver in the team sprint, Jason Kenny became Great Britain's most successful Olympian, cycling's most successful Olympian and the joint most decorated British and cycling Olympian with Bradley Wiggins.

Athlete	Event	Qualification		Semifinals		Final	
Athlete	Event	Time Speed (km/h)	Rank	Opposition Time Speed (km/h)	Rank	Opposition Time Speed (km/h)	Rank
Jack Carlin; Jason Kenny; Ryan Owens	Men's team sprint	42.231; 63.934	2	Germany; W 41.829; 64.549	2 FA	Netherlands; L 44.589; 60.553	2nd place, silver medalist(s)

Qualification legend: FA=Gold medal final; FB=Bronze medal final * Philip Hindes travels as reserve.

Pursuit

Athlete	Event	Qualification		Semifinals		Final	
Athlete	Event	Time	Rank	Opponent Results	Rank	Opponent Results	Rank
Ed Clancy; Ethan Hayter; Ethan Vernon; Matthew Walls; Oliver Wood; Charlie Tanfield*	Men's team pursuit	3:47.507	4	Denmark; 4:28.489	8	Switzerland; 3:45.636	7
Katie Archibald; Elinor Barker; Neah Evans; Laura Kenny; Josie Knight	Women's team pursuit	4:09.022	2	United States; 4:07.562	2	Germany; 4:10.607	2nd place, silver medalist(s)

* Charlie Tanfield originally travelled as a reserve. Following the qualification ride of the men's team pursuit, Ed Clancy withdrew from the men's team, citing a back injury, and announced his immediate retirement. As a consequence, Tanfield was called into the main squad and rode the heat and placing final. In the former, he suffered a crash when clipped from behind by the Denmark team.

Keirin

Athlete	Event	Round 1	Repechage	Quarterfinals	Semifinals	Final
Athlete	Event	Rank	Rank	Rank	Rank	Rank
Jack Carlin	Men's keirin	1 Q	Bye	2 Q	4 FB	8
Jason Kenny	Men's keirin	4 R	1 Q	2 Q	1 FA	1st place, gold medalist(s)
Katy Marchant	Women's keirin	REL	1 Q	5	Did not advance	

Omnium

Athlete	Event	Scratch race		Tempo race		Elimination race		Points race		Total	
Athlete	Event	Rank	Points	Rank	Points	Rank	Points	Rank	Points	Points	Rank
Matthew Walls	Men's omnium	1	40	3	36	2	38	2	39	153	1st place, gold medalist(s)
Laura Kenny	Women's omnium	DNF	16	1	40	13	16	1	24	96	6

Madison

Athlete	Event	Points	Laps	Rank
Ethan Hayter; Matthew Walls	Men's madison	40	0	2nd place, silver medalist(s)
Katie Archibald; Laura Kenny	Women's madison	58	20	1st place, gold medalist(s)

=== Mountain biking ===
Great Britain entered single mountain bikers to compete in both the men's and women's cross-country races. The men's quota was gained by finishing in the top two eligible nations of the under-23 division at the 2019 UCI Mountain Bike World Championships in Mont-Sainte-Anne, Canada. The women's quota was secured by virtue of their position in the UCI World Ranking for nations as at 16 May 2021.

Tom Pidcock's preparations for the men's event were disrupted when he broke his collarbone after being hit by a car during training in May 2021. However, he recovered to be able to compete in the Games where we won Britain's first ever Olympic mountain biking medal, winning gold by a margin of 20 seconds over second placed Mathias Flückiger of Switzerland.

Athlete	Event	Time	Rank
Tom Pidcock	Men's cross-country	1:25:14	1st place, gold medalist(s)
Evie Richards	Women's cross-country	1:19:09	7

=== BMX ===
Great Britain received two quota spots (one per gender) for BMX racing at the Olympics. The men's place was secured as a result of the nation's seventh-place finish in the UCI Olympic Ranking List of 1 June 2021, while the women's was derived from Beth Shriever's individual ranking.

In BMX freestyle, two places (one per gender) were awarded to the British squad at the Olympics; both were secured as a result of the nation's top-five finish in the UCI Olympic Ranking List of 8 June 2021.

Race

Athlete	Event	Quarterfinal		Semifinal		Final	
Athlete	Event	Points	Rank	Points	Rank	Result	Rank
Kye Whyte	Men's race	9	2 Q	8	2 Q	39.167	2nd place, silver medalist(s)
Beth Shriever	Women's race	5	1 Q	3	1 Q	44.358	1st place, gold medalist(s)

* Ross Cullen travels as reserve.

Freestyle

Athlete	Event	Seeding				Final		
Athlete	Event	Run 1	Run 2	Average	Rank	Run 1	Run 2	Rank
Declan Brooks	Men's freestyle	74.30	79.20	76.75	7	89.40	90.80	3rd place, bronze medalist(s)
Charlotte Worthington	Women's freestyle	81.80	81.20	81.50	4	38.60	97.50	1st place, gold medalist(s)

== Diving ==
British divers gained a full quota of 16 places for the following individual spots and synchronized teams at the Games through the 2019 FINA World Championships, the 2019 European Championships and the 2021 FINA Diving World Cup. The divers who secured the places for Great Britain were not necessarily the athletes who would be selected to represent their team in these events. Instead, they needed to compete at the Olympic trials to book their places for the Games. A team of 12 divers was announced on 2 June 2021, including defending champions Jack Laugher and Daniel Goodfellow in the men's synchronized springboard; and two-time world champion and multiple Olympic medallist Tom Daley. James Heatly, Katherine Torrance and Matty Lee make Olympic debuts, having all won gold in the inaugural European Games in 2015 as juniors with the returning Lois Toulson, while Grace Reid will do so as a reigning Commonwealth Games champion. European bronze and silver medallist Andrea Spendolini-Sirieix, the youngest of the squad, debuts at 16 years old.

Laugher, Daley, Reid and Touslon will double up in individual and synchronised events, with their quota places released to be filled by next-in-line alternates.

Men

Athlete	Event	Preliminary		Semifinal		Final	
Athlete	Event	Points	Rank	Points	Rank	Points	Rank
James Heatly	3 m springboard	458.40	4 Q	454.85	4 Q	411.00	9
Jack Laugher	3 m springboard	445.05	6 Q	514.75	3 Q	518.00	3rd place, bronze medalist(s)
Tom Daley	10 m platform	453.70	4 Q	462.90	4 Q	548.25	3rd place, bronze medalist(s)
Noah Williams	10 m platform	309.55	27	Did not advance			
Daniel Goodfellow; Jack Laugher	3 m synchronized springboard	—N/a				382.80	7
Tom Daley; Matty Lee	10 m synchronized platform	—N/a				471.81	1st place, gold medalist(s)

Women

Athlete	Event	Preliminary		Semifinal		Final	
Athlete	Event	Points	Rank	Points	Rank	Points	Rank
Scarlett Mew Jensen	3 m springboard	243.45	22	Did not advance			
Grace Reid	3 m springboard	268.15	19	Did not advance			
Andrea Spendolini-Sirieix	10 m platform	307.70	10 Q	314.00	8 Q	305.50	7
Lois Toulson	10 m platform	314.00	7 Q	311.10	9 Q	289.6	9
Grace Reid; Katherine Torrance	3 m synchronized springboard	—N/a				269.10	6
Eden Cheng; Lois Toulson	10 m synchronized platform	—N/a				289.26	7

== Equestrian ==
British equestrians qualified a full squad in the team dressage, eventing, and jumping competitions by virtue of a top-six finish at the 2018 FEI World Equestrian Games in Tryon, North Carolina, United States in dressage and eventing, and a top-three finish among eligible nations in the jumping competition at the 2019 FEI European Championships in Rotterdam, Netherlands.

On 1 July 2021, Team GB announced the selection of their dressage and eventing teams for Tokyo. Included in the dressage team were triple gold medallist Charlotte Dujardin and Carl Hester who will be competing at his sixth Olympic Games. The following day Team GB revealed the names of the three riders who will compete in the jumping events in Tokyo. The team included London 2012 gold medallists Scott Brash and Ben Maher.

In the team dressage the British team of Dujardin, Hester and Charlotte Fry finished in the bronze medal position. This was Dujardin's fifth Olympic medal, tying her with rower Katherine Grainger and tennis player Kathleen McKane Godfree as the female British athletes with the most Olympic medals. The following day in the individual dressage Dujardin, who was the two-time defending Olympic champion in the event, took another bronze medal, making her the first female British athlete to win six Olympic medals.

=== Dressage ===
Athlete	Horse	Event	Grand Prix		Grand Prix Special		Grand Prix Freestyle		Overall	
Athlete	Horse	Event	Score	Rank	Score	Rank	Technical	Artistic	Score	Rank
Charlotte Dujardin	Gio	Individual	80.963	4 Q	—N/a		83.000	94.086	88.543	3rd place, bronze medalist(s)
Charlotte Fry	Everdale	Individual	77.096	8 Q	—N/a		75.714	85.514	80.614	13
Carl Hester	En Vogue	Individual	75.124	13 q	—N/a		77.750	85.886	81.818	8
Charlotte Dujardin; Charlotte Fry; Carl Hester	See above	Team	7508.5	2 Q	7723.0	3	—N/a		7723.0	3rd place, bronze medalist(s)

Travelling reserve: Gareth Hughes (Sintano Van Hof Olympia)

Qualification Legend: Q = Qualified for the final; q = Qualified for the final as a lucky loser

=== Eventing ===
Athlete	Horse	Event	Dressage		Cross-country			Jumping						Total	
Athlete	Horse	Event	Dressage		Cross-country			Qualifier			Final			Total	
Athlete	Horse	Event	Penalties	Rank	Penalties	Total	Rank	Penalties	Total	Rank	Penalties	Total	Rank	Penalties	Rank
Laura Collett	London 52	Individual	25.80	6	0.00	25.80	3	4.00	29.80	5 Q	8.00	37.80	9	37.80	9
Tom McEwen	Toledo de Kerser	Individual	28.90	12	0.00	28.90	6	0.00	28.90	3 Q	0.00	28.90	2	28.90	2nd place, silver medalist(s)
Oliver Townend	Ballaghmor Class	Individual	23.60	2	0.00	23.60	1	4.00	27.60	2 Q	4.80	32.40	5	32.40	5
Laura Collett; Tom McEwen; Oliver Townend	See above	Team	78.30	1	0.00	78.30	1	8.00	86.30	1	—N/a			86.30	1st place, gold medalist(s)

Travelling reserve: Rosalind Canter (Allstar B)

=== Jumping ===
Athlete	Horse	Event	Qualification		Final			Jump-off		
Athlete	Horse	Event	Penalties	Rank	Penalties	Time	Rank	Penalties	Time	Rank
Scott Brash	Hello Jefferson	Individual	0	=1 Q	1	88.45	7	Did not advance		
Harry Charles	Romeo 88	Individual	0	=1 Q	Retired			Did not advance		
Ben Maher	Explosion W	Individual	0	=1 Q	0	85.67	=1	0	37.85	1st place, gold medalist(s)
Harry Charles; Ben Maher; Holly Smith	Romeo 88; Explosion W Denver	Team	20	7 Q	24+WD	162.46	10	Did not advance		

* Harry Charles was the travelling reserve and he was called on to substitute for Holly Smith in the individual event and for Scott Brash in the team competition following an injury to the latter's horse, Hello Jefferson.

== Fencing ==
Great Britain entered one fencer into the Olympic competition. 2019 world silver medallist Marcus Mepstead claimed a spot in the men's foil as one of the two highest-ranked fencers vying for qualification from Europe in the FIE Adjusted Official Rankings.

Athlete	Event	Round of 64	Round of 32	Round of 16	Quarterfinal	Semifinal	Final / BM	
Athlete	Event	Opposition Score	Opposition Score	Opposition Score	Opposition Score	Opposition Score	Opposition Score	Rank
Marcus Mepstead	Men's foil	Bye	Hamza (EGY); L 13–15	Did not advance				

== Field hockey ==
Summary

Key:

- FT – After full-time.
- P – Match decided by penalty-shootout.

Team	Event	Group Stage						Quarterfinal	Semifinal	Final / BM	
Team	Event	Opposition Score	Opposition Score	Opposition Score	Opposition Score	Opposition Score	Rank	Opposition Score	Opposition Score	Opposition Score	Rank
Great Britain men's	Men's tournament	South Africa; W 3–1	Canada; W 3–1	Germany; L 1–5	Netherlands; D 2–2	Belgium; D 2–2	3 Q	India; L 1–3	Did not advance		5
Great Britain women's	Women's tournament	Germany; L 1–2	South Africa; W 4–1	India; W 4–1	Netherlands; L 0–1	Ireland; W 2–0	3 Q	Spain; D 2–2 FT (2–0 P)	Netherlands; L 1–5	India; W 4–3	3rd place, bronze medalist(s)

=== Men's tournament ===
Great Britain men's national field hockey team qualified for the Olympics by securing one of the seven team quotas available from the 2019 Men's FIH Olympic Qualifiers, defeating Malaysia 9–3 on aggregate in a two-match playoff in London.

Squad

The squad was announced on 17 June 2021.

Head coach: Danny Kerry

No.	Pos.	Player	Date of birth (age)	Caps	Goals	Club
5	DF	David Ames	25 June 1989 (aged 32)	101	{{{goals}}}	(England) Holcombe
6	MF	Jacob Draper	24 July 1998 (aged 23)	66	{{{goals}}}	(England) Hampstead & Westminster
7	FW	Alan Forsyth	5 April 1992 (aged 29)	189	{{{goals}}}	(England) Surbiton
8	FW	Rupert Shipperley	21 November 1992 (aged 28)	87	{{{goals}}}	(England) Hampstead & Westminster
9	MF	Harry Martin	23 October 1992 (aged 28)	238	{{{goals}}}	(England) Hampstead & Westminster
10	FW	Chris Griffiths	3 September 1990 (aged 30)	112	{{{goals}}}	(England) Old Georgians
11	MF	Ian Sloan	19 November 1993 (aged 27)	112	{{{goals}}}	(England) Wimbledon
13	FW	Sam Ward	24 December 1990 (aged 30)	135	{{{goals}}}	(England) Old Georgians
15	FW	Phil Roper	24 January 1992 (aged 29)	155	{{{goals}}}	(England) Wimbledon
16	MF	Adam Dixon (Captain)	11 September 1986 (aged 34)	284	{{{goals}}}	(England) Beeston
18	DF	Brendan Creed	3 January 1993 (aged 28)	87	{{{goals}}}	(England) Surbiton
20	GK	Ollie Payne	6 April 1999 (aged 22)	11	{{{goals}}}	(England) Holcombe
21	FW	Liam Ansell	12 November 1993 (aged 27)	54	{{{goals}}}	(England) Wimbledon
25	DF	Jack Waller	28 January 1997 (aged 24)	55	{{{goals}}}	(England) Wimbledon
26	MF	James Gall	20 May 1995 (aged 26)	88	{{{goals}}}	(England) Surbiton
27	DF	Liam Sanford	14 March 1996 (aged 25)	69	{{{goals}}}	(England) Old Georgians
29	DF	Tom Sorsby	28 October 1996 (aged 24)	39	{{{goals}}}	(England) Surbiton
32	FW	Zach Wallace	29 September 1999 (aged 21)	55	{{{goals}}}	(England) Surbiton

Travelling reserves: Alan Forsyth and Harry Martin

Group play

Pos	Team	Pld	W	D	L	GF	GA	GD	Pts	Qualification
1	Belgium	5	4	1	0	26	9	+17	13	Quarter-finals
2	Germany	5	3	0	2	19	10	+9	9	Quarter-finals
3	Great Britain	5	2	2	1	11	11	0	8	Quarter-finals
4	Netherlands	5	2	1	2	13	13	0	7	Quarter-finals
5	South Africa	5	1	1	3	16	24	−8	4	
6	Canada	5	0	1	4	9	27	−18	1	

Source: Tokyo 2020 and FIH
Rules for classification: 1) points; 2) matches won; 3) goal difference; 4) goals for; 5) head-to-head result; 6) field goals scored.

24 July 2021
18:30
v

Great Britain	3–1	South Africa
Ward 2'; Ansell 32'; Waller 56'	Report	Guise-Brown 4'

North Pitch
Umpires:
Germán Montes de Oca (ARG)
Ben Goentgen (GER)

26 July 2021
11:45
v

Great Britain	3–1	Canada
Ansell 33', 57'; Ward 41'	Report	Van Son 51'

North Pitch
Umpires:
Lim Hong Zhen (SGP)
Marcin Grochal (POL)

27 July 2021
12:15
v

Germany	5–1	Great Britain
Fuchs 15', 51', 60'; Rühr 35'; Weigand 42'	Report	Roper 8'

South Pitch
Umpires:
Simon Taylor (NZL)
Adam Kearns (AUS)

29 July 2021
12:15
v

Netherlands	2–2	Great Britain
Brinkman 22'; Janssen 31'	Report	Ward 52', 57'

South Pitch
Umpires:
Raghu Prasad (IND)
Germán Montes de Oca (ARG)

30 July 2021
21:15
v

Belgium	2–2	Great Britain
Boon 36'; Briels 43'	Report	Shipperley 17'; Ansell 38'

South Pitch
Umpires:
Simon Taylor (NZL)
Francisco Vázquez (ESP)

Quarterfinal

1 August 2021
21:00
v

India	3–1	Great Britain
Dilpreet 7'; Gurjant 16'; Hardik 57'	Report	Ward 45'

Umpires:
Marcin Grochal (POL)
Simon Taylor (NZL)

=== Women's tournament ===
Great Britain women's national field hockey team qualified for the Olympics by securing one of the seven team quotas available from the 2019 Women's FIH Olympic Qualifiers, defeating Chile 5–1 on aggregate in a two-match playoff in London. On 17 June, Great Britain Hockey announced the selection of the squad that would represent the team in Tokyo.

Squad

The squad was announced on 17 June 2021.

Head coach: (United Kingdom) Mark Hager

No.	Pos.	Player	Date of birth (age)	Caps	Goals	Club
1	GK	Maddie Hinch	8 October 1988 (aged 32)	158	0	No club listed
4	MF	Laura Unsworth	8 March 1988 (aged 33)	276	11	(England) East Grinstead
5	MF	Sarah Evans	12 April 1991 (aged 30)	122	9	(England) Surbiton
6	DF	Anna Toman	29 April 1993 (aged 28)	91	7	(England) Wimbledon
7	FW	Hannah Martin	30 December 1994 (aged 26)	77	15	(England) Hampstead & Westminster
8	MF	Sarah Jones	25 June 1990 (aged 31)	129	13	(England) Holcombe
9	MF	Susannah Townsend	28 July 1989 (aged 31)	180	13	(England) Canterbury
10	FW	Sarah Robertson	27 September 1993 (aged 27)	158	13	(England) Hampstead & Westminster
13	FW	Elena Rayer	22 November 1996 (aged 24)	58	3	(England) East Grinstead
16	FW	Isabelle Petter	27 June 2000 (aged 21)	33	6	(England) Loughborough Students
17	DF	Leah Wilkinson	3 December 1986 (aged 34)	182	23	(England) Holcombe
18	DF	Giselle Ansley	31 March 1992 (aged 29)	165	23	(England) Surbiton
20	DF	Hollie Pearne-Webb (Captain)	19 September 1990 (aged 30)	191	8	No club listed
21	MF	Fiona Crackles	11 February 2000 (aged 21)	13	0	(England) Durham University
24	MF	Shona McCallin	18 May 1992 (aged 29)	93	3	No club listed
26	FW	Lily Owsley	10 December 1994 (aged 26)	164	36	(England) Hampstead & Westminster
31	DF	Grace Balsdon	13 April 1993 (aged 28)	81	7	(England) Hampstead & Westminster
32	DF	Amy Costello	14 January 1998 (aged 23)	88		(England) East Grinstead

Group play

Pos	Team	Pld	W	D	L	GF	GA	GD	Pts	Qualification
1	Netherlands	5	5	0	0	18	2	+16	15	Quarterfinals
2	Germany	5	4	0	1	13	7	+6	12	Quarterfinals
3	Great Britain	5	3	0	2	11	5	+6	9	Quarterfinals
4	India	5	2	0	3	7	14	−7	6	Quarterfinals
5	Ireland	5	1	0	4	4	11	−7	3	
6	South Africa	5	0	0	5	5	19	−14	0	

Source: Tokyo 2020 and FIH
Rules for classification: 1) points; 2) matches won; 3) goal difference; 4) goals for; 5) head-to-head result; 6) field goals scored.

25 July 2021
09:30
v

Great Britain	1–2	Germany
Jones 13'	Report	Huse 24'; Stapenhorst 33'

North Pitch
Umpires:
Liu Xiaoying (CHN)
Irene Presenqui (ARG)

26 July 2021
18:30
v

South Africa	1–4	Great Britain
Walraven 6'	Report	Rayer 29', 50'; Toman 39'; Unsworth 40'

North Pitch
Umpires:
Carolina de la Fuente (ARG)
Maggie Giddens (USA)

28 July 2021
10:00
v

Great Britain	4–1	India
Martin 2', 19'; Owsley 41'; Balsdon 57'	Report	Sharmila 23'

South Pitch
Umpires:
Laurine Delforge (BEL)
Aleisha Neumann (AUS)

29 July 2021
19:00
v

Great Britain	0–1	Netherlands
	Report	Matla 13'

South Pitch
Umpires:
Michelle Joubert (RSA)
Aleisha Neumann (AUS)

31 July 2021
20:45
v

Ireland	0–2	Great Britain
	Report	Townsend 17'; Martin 32'

North Pitch
Umpires:
Carolina de la Fuente (ARG)
Emi Yamada (JPN)

Quarterfinal

2 August 2021
21:00
v

Spain	2–2	Great Britain
Iglesias 20'; Bonastre 51'	Report	Martin 17'; Balsdon 37'
Penalties
Ycart (penalty shoot-out missed); García Grau (penalty shoot-out missed); Oliva (penalty shoot-out missed); Pérez (penalty shoot-out missed)	0–2	(penalty shoot-out missed) Toman; (penalty shoot-out scored) Martin; (penalty shoot-out scored) Jones

Umpires:
Aleisha Neumann (AUS)
Annelize Rostron (RSA)

Semifinal

4 August 2021
10:30
v

Netherlands	5–1	Great Britain
Albers 19', 38'; Keetels 18'; Verschoor 32'; Matla 49'	Report	Ansley 41'

Umpires:
Michelle Joubert (RSA)
Laurine Delforge (BEL)

Bronze medal game

6 August 2021
10:30
v

(bronze) Great Britain	4–3	India
Rayer 16'; Robertson 24'; Pearne-Webb 35'; Balsdon 48'	Report	Gurjit 25', 26'; Vandana 29'

Umpires:
Michelle Joubert (RSA)
Michelle Meister (GER)

== Football ==
Summary

Key:

- A.E.T – After extra time.
- P – Match decided by penalty-shootout.

Team	Event	Group Stage				Quarterfinal	Semifinal	Final / BM	
Team	Event	Opposition Score	Opposition Score	Opposition Score	Rank	Opposition Score	Opposition Score	Opposition Score	Rank
Great Britain women	Women's tournament	Chile; W 2–0	Japan; W 1–0	Canada; D 1–1	1 Q	Australia; L 3–4^{aet F.T.: 2–2}	Did not advance		5

=== Women's tournament ===
The FIFA Women's World Cup serves as the UEFA qualifying competition for the Olympic football tournament, with the top three sides qualifying. On 27 June 2019, England reached the semi-finals of the 2019 FIFA Women's World Cup; the following day, the United States were confirmed as their opponents. This made England one of the top three European sides in the competition, which, under an agreement between the FA and the other three home nations and FIFA, allowed Great Britain to take up the qualifying place for the 2020 Olympics won by England.

Squad

The final squad of 22 athletes was originally announced on 27 May 2021. Before the tournament, Carly Telford replaced the injured Karen Bardsley on 18 June 2021.

Head coach: (Norway) Hege Riise

No.	Pos.	Player	Date of birth (age)	Caps	Goals	Club
1	GK	(England) Ellie Roebuck	23 September 1999 (aged 21)	0	0	(The Football Association) Manchester City
2	DF	(England) Lucy Bronze	28 October 1991 (aged 29)	0	0	(The Football Association) Manchester City
3	DF	(England) Demi Stokes	12 December 1991 (aged 29)	0	0	(The Football Association) Manchester City
4	MF	(England) Keira Walsh	8 April 1997 (aged 24)	0	0	(The Football Association) Manchester City
5	DF	(England) Steph Houghton	23 April 1988 (aged 33)	5	3	(The Football Association) Manchester City
6	MF	(Wales) Sophie Ingle	2 September 1991 (aged 29)	0	0	(The Football Association) Chelsea
7	FW	(England) Nikita Parris	10 March 1994 (aged 27)	0	0	(French Football Federation) Lyon
8	MF	(Scotland) Kim Little	29 June 1990 (aged 31)	5	0	(The Football Association) Arsenal
9	FW	(England) Ellen White	9 May 1989 (aged 32)	4	0	(The Football Association) Manchester City
10	MF	(England) Fran Kirby	29 June 1993 (aged 28)	0	0	(The Football Association) Chelsea
11	MF	(Scotland) Caroline Weir	20 June 1995 (aged 26)	0	0	(The Football Association) Manchester City
12	DF	(England) Rachel Daly	6 December 1991 (aged 29)	0	0	(United States Soccer Federation) Houston Dash
13	GK	(England) Carly Telford	7 July 1987 (aged 34)	0	0	(The Football Association) Chelsea
14	DF	(England) Millie Bright	21 August 1993 (aged 27)	0	0	(The Football Association) Chelsea
15	FW	(England) Lauren Hemp	7 August 2000 (aged 20)	0	0	(The Football Association) Manchester City
16	DF	(England) Leah Williamson	29 March 1997 (aged 24)	0	0	(The Football Association) Arsenal
17	MF	(England) Georgia Stanway	3 January 1999 (aged 22)	0	0	(The Football Association) Manchester City
18	MF	(England) Jill Scott	2 February 1987 (aged 34)	5	1	(The Football Association) Everton
19	DF	(England) Niamh Charles	21 June 1999 (aged 22)	0	0	(The Football Association) Chelsea
20	FW	(England) Ella Toone	2 September 1999 (aged 21)	0	0	(The Football Association) Manchester United
21	DF	(England) Lotte Wubben-Moy	11 January 1999 (aged 22)	0	0	(The Football Association) Arsenal
22	GK	(England) (Scotland) Sandy MacIver (Note: Sandy MacIver had represented the England senior team once in a friendly at the time of the 2020 Olympics. She subsequently switched to the Scotland national team in October 2023.)	18 June 1998 (aged 23)	0	0	(The Football Association) Everton

Group play

Pos	Team	Pld	W	D	L	GF	GA	GD	Pts	Qualification
1	Great Britain	3	2	1	0	4	1	+3	7	Advance to knockout stage
2	Canada	3	1	2	0	4	3	+1	5	Advance to knockout stage
3	Japan (H)	3	1	1	1	2	2	0	4	Advance to knockout stage
4	Chile	3	0	0	3	1	5	−4	0	

Source: TOCOG and FIFA
Rules for classification: Group stage tiebreakers
(H) Hosts
21 July 2021
16:30

Great Britain	2–0	Chile
White 18', 73'	Report (TOCOG); Report (FIFA)

Sapporo Dome, Sapporo
Attendance: 0
Referee: Salima Mukansanga (Rwanda)

24 July 2021
19:30

Japan	0–1	Great Britain
	Report (TOCOG); Report (FIFA)	White 74'

Sapporo Dome, Sapporo
Attendance: 0
Referee: Anastasia Pustovoitova (Russia)

27 July 2021
20:00

Canada	1–1	Great Britain
Leon 55'	Report (TOCOG); Report (FIFA)	Prince 85' (o.g.)

Kashima Stadium, Kashima
Attendance: 0
Referee: Kateryna Monzul (Ukraine)

Quarter-finals

30 July 2021
18:00

Great Britain	3–4 (a.e.t.)	Australia
White 57', 66', 115'	Report (TOCOG); Report (FIFA)	Kennedy 35'; Kerr 89', 106'; Fowler 103'

Kashima Stadium, Kashima
Attendance: 0
Referee: Salima Mukansanga (Rwanda)

== Golf ==
Great Britain entered a total of two male and two female golfers into the Olympic tournament. Tyrrell Hatton and Paul Casey qualified directly among the top 60 eligible players for the men's event. However, Hatton announced his withdrawal on 21 June 2021 due to the COVID-19 pandemic and he was replaced by Tommy Fleetwood. Mel Reid and Jodi Ewart Shadoff qualified in a similar manner through the women's rankings. The latter following the withdrawal of higher-ranked British golfers Charley Hull and Georgia Hall. On 6 July 2021, Team GB confirmed the selection of the four golfers who will represent the team in Tokyo.

Athlete	Event	Round 1	Round 2	Round 3	Round 4	Total		
Athlete	Event	Score	Score	Score	Score	Score	Par	Rank
Paul Casey	Men's	67	68	66	68	269	−15	=4
Tommy Fleetwood	Men's	70	69	64	70	273	−11	=16
Jodi Ewart Shadoff	Women's	74	68	70	72	284	E	=40
Mel Reid	Women's	73	75	76	68	292	+8	55

== Gymnastics ==
=== Artistic ===
Great Britain fielded a full squad of four gymnasts in the women's artistic gymnastics events by finishing fourth out of the nations eligible for qualification in the team all-around qualification round at the 2019 World Artistic Gymnastics Championships in Stuttgart, Germany. The top nine eligible nations were awarded qualification places. The men's artistic gymnastics team also secured a place after finishing second among the nations eligible for qualification in the team all-around qualification round at the same championships. Again, nine team berths were available at this competition in total. On 24 May 2021, Team GB announced the selection of the four members of the men's squad including reigning individual pommel horse and floor exercise champion Max Whitlock together with three debutants. In June 2021, Team GB announced the selection of the four members of the women's team; all of them will make their Olympic debuts, including the twin sisters Jennifer and Jessica Gadirova.

Men
Team

Athlete	Event	Qualification								Final							
Athlete	Event	Apparatus						Total	Rank	Apparatus						Total	Rank
Athlete	Event	F	PH	R	V	PB	HB	Total	Rank	F	PH	R	V	PB	HB	Total	Rank
Joe Fraser	Team	14.066	14.666	14.400	13.833	15.400 Q	13.933	86.298	5 Q	13.866	14.666	14.500	14.133	14.666	14.333	—N/a	
James Hall	Team	13.866	14.100	13.733	14.333	14.333	14.066	84.431	16 Q	14.033	14.000	13.600	14.233	13.100	14.200	—N/a	
Giarnni Regini-Moran	Team	14.666	~~12.166~~	13.366	14.600	14.933	~~13.100~~	82.831	23	14.533	—N/a	13.733	14.666	15.166	—N/a	—N/a	
Max Whitlock	Team	—N/a	14.900 Q	—N/a		~~14.100~~	13.400	—N/a		14.966	—N/a				13.366	—N/a	
Total	Team	42.598	43.666	41.499	42.766	44.666	41.399	256.594	5 Q	42.432	43.632	41.833	43.032	42.932	41.899	255.760	4

Individual

Athlete	Event	Qualification								Final							
Athlete	Event	Apparatus						Total	Rank	Apparatus						Total	Rank
Athlete	Event	F	PH	R	V	PB	HB	Total	Rank	F	PH	R	V	PB	HB	Total	Rank
Joe Fraser	All-around	See team results								14.100	13.300	14.433	13.133	15.133	14.400	84.499	9
Joe Fraser	Parallel bars	—N/a				15.400	—N/a	15.400	7 Q	—N/a				14.500	—N/a	14.500	8
James Hall	All-around	See team results								14.466	13.433	13.966	14.300	14.433	14.000	84.598	8
Max Whitlock	Pommel horse	—N/a	14.900	—N/a				14.900	5 Q	—N/a	15.583	—N/a				15.583	1st place, gold medalist(s)

Women
Team

Athlete	Event	Qualification						Final					
Athlete	Event	Apparatus				Total	Rank	Apparatus				Total	Rank
Athlete	Event	V	UB	BB	F	Total	Rank	V	UB	BB	F	Total	Rank
Jennifer Gadirova	Team	14.533	13.066	13.300	13.800 Q*	54.699	17 Q	14.433	—N/a	13.300	13.700	—N/a	
Jessica Gadirova	Team	14.500	13.800	12.866	14.033 Q	55.199	12 Q	14.433	13.566	—N/a	13.833	—N/a	
Alice Kinsella	Team	14.166	~~12.633~~	~~12.100~~	12.766	51.665	48	14.266	14.166	13.333	12.800	—N/a	
Amelie Morgan	Team	~~13.858~~	13.833	13.033	~~12.466~~	53.190	33	—N/a	14.033	12.233	—N/a	—N/a	
Total	Team	43.199	40.699	39.199	40.599	163.396	6 Q	43.132	41.765	38.866	40.333	164.096	3rd place, bronze medalist(s)

Individual

Athlete	Event	Qualification						Final					
Athlete	Event	Apparatus				Total	Rank	Apparatus				Total	Rank
Athlete	Event	V	UB	BB	F	Total	Rank	V	UB	BB	F	Total	Rank
Jennifer Gadirova	All-around	See team results						13.800	12.400	12.933	13.800	53.533	13
Jennifer Gadirova	Floor	—N/a			13.800	13.800	9 Q*	—N/a			13.233	13.233	7
Jessica Gadirova	All-around	See team results						14.566	13.666	12.033	13.700	53.965	10
Jessica Gadirova	Floor	—N/a			14.033	14.033	5 Q	—N/a			14.000	14.000	6

* Originally first reserve, Jennifer Gadirova was promoted to the floor final following the withdrawal of Simone Biles.

=== Trampoline ===
Great Britain qualified one gymnast for the women's trampoline by finishing in the top eight at the 2019 World Championships in Tokyo, Japan. Great Britain secured a second quota when Rio silver medallist Bryony Page finished fourth in the 2020/21 Trampoline World Cup series. On 10 June 2021, Page and Laura Gallagher were selected to fill these quotas in Tokyo.

Athlete	Event	Qualification		Final	
Athlete	Event	Score	Rank	Score	Rank
Laura Gallagher	Women's	53.335	15	Did not advance	
Bryony Page	Women's	104.664	3 Q	55.735	3rd place, bronze medalist(s)

== Judo ==
Great Britain, at the conclusion of the 2021 World Judo championships, had achieved quota places in the following weight categories. Nekoda Smythe-Davis had qualified a continental quota place in the −57 kg category, but had already withdrawn from Olympic consideration for health reasons. On 5 July 2021, Team GB announced the judokas who will compete in Tokyo, including debutant Sarah Adlington in the women's heavyweight category, who had been awarded a continental quota following the official withdrawal of Smythe-Davis.

Athlete	Event	Round of 32	Round of 16	Quarterfinals	Semifinals	Repechage	Final / BM	
Athlete	Event	Opposition Result	Opposition Result	Opposition Result	Opposition Result	Opposition Result	Opposition Result	Rank
Ashley McKenzie	Men's −60 kg	Huseynov (AZE); L 00–01	Did not advance					
Chelsie Giles	Women's −52 kg	Rexhepi (MKD); W 01–00	Iraoui (MAR); W 01–00	Abe (JPN); L 00–01	—N/a	van Snick (BEL); W 10–00	Kocher (SUI); W 10–00	3rd place, bronze medalist(s)
Lucy Renshall	Women's −63 kg	Tashiro (JPN); L 00–01	Did not advance					
Gemma Howell	Women's −70 kg	Pérez (PUR); L 00–10	Did not advance					
Natalie Powell	Women's −78 kg	Bye	Yoon H-j (KOR); L 00–11	Did not advance				
Sarah Adlington	Women's +78 kg	Chikhrouhou (TUN); L 00–10	Did not advance					

== Modern pentathlon ==
British athletes qualified for the following spots in the modern pentathlon at the Games. Rio 2016 Olympian Joe Choong secured an outright berth in the men's event by winning the gold medal at the 2019 UIPM World Cup Final in Tokyo, Japan, becoming the first athlete to be named to Team GB for Tokyo 2020. World champion Jamie Cooke and fellow Briton Kate French confirmed places in their respective events with a podium finish (gold for Cooke and silver for French) at the 2019 European Championships in Bath. Following the conclusion of the 2021 UIPM Worlds, a second and final women's quota place was confirmed based on the world rankings. On 24 June 2021, Team GB announced the names of the four modern pentathletes chosen to compete in Tokyo.

Athlete	Event	Fencing (épée one touch)				Swimming (200 m freestyle)			Riding (show jumping)			Combined: shooting/running (10 m air pistol)/(3200 m)			Total points	Final rank
Athlete	Event	RR	BR	Rank	MP points	Time	Rank	MP points	Penalties	Rank	MP points	Time	Rank	MP Points	Total points	Final rank
Joe Choong	Men's	25–10	2	1	252	1:54.87	3	321	14	14	286	11:17.53	15	623	1482 OR	1st place, gold medalist(s)
Jamie Cooke	Men's	18–17	0	16	208	1:53.80	2	323	7	8	293	11:12.30	14	628	1452	9
Kate French	Women's	20–15	1	7	221	2:10.18	8	290	6	4	294	12:00.34	5	580	1385 OR	1st place, gold medalist(s)
Jo Muir	Women's	13–22	1	33	179	2:14.52	15	281	7	7	293	12:15.13	9	565	1318	14

== Rowing ==
Great Britain qualified ten out of fourteen boats for each of the following rowing classes into the Olympic regatta, with all of the crews confirming Olympic places for their boats at the 2019 FISA World Championships in Ottensheim, Austria. On 9 June 2021, Team GB announced the names of the 41 rowers who would represent them in Tokyo. Notable rowers in the squad included double Olympic champion Helen Glover and two-time medallist Moe Sbihi. In addition, four travelling reserves were named: Morgan Bolding, Matthew Tarrant, Madeleine Arlett and Saskia Budgett.

Men

Athlete	Event	Heats		Repechage		Semifinals		Final	
Athlete	Event	Time	Rank	Time	Rank	Time	Rank	Time	Rank
John Collins; Graeme Thomas	Double sculls	6:12.80	2 SA/B	Bye		6:22.95	2 FA	6:06.46	4
Sholto Carnegie; Oliver Cook; Rory Gibbs; Matthew Rossiter	Four	5:55.36	1 FA	Bye		—N/a		5:45.78	4
Tom Barras; Jack Beaumont; Angus Groom; Harry Leask	Quadruple sculls	5:42.01	3 R	5:55.91	1 FA	—N/a		5:33.75	2nd place, silver medalist(s)
Josh Bugajski; Jacob Dawson; Charles Elwes; Thomas Ford; Thomas George; James Rudkin; Moe Sbihi; Oliver Wynne-Griffith; Henry Fieldman (cox)	Eight	5:34.40	3 R	5:23.32	2 FA	—N/a		5:25.73	3rd place, bronze medalist(s)

Women

Athlete	Event	Heats		Repechage		Quarterfinals		Semifinals		Final	
Athlete	Event	Time	Rank	Time	Rank	Time	Rank	Time	Rank	Time	Rank
Victoria Thornley	Single sculls	7:44.30	1 QF	Bye		7:59.93	3 SA/B	7:25.12	2 FA	7:20.39	4
Helen Glover; Polly Swann	Pair	7:23.98	3 SA/B	Bye		—N/a		6:49.39	2 FA	6:54.96	4
Emily Craig; Imogen Grant	Lightweight double sculls	7:03.29	2 SA/B	Bye		—N/a		6:41.99	1 FA	6:48.04	4
Karen Bennett; Rowan McKellar; Rebecca Shorten; Harriet Taylor	Four	6:41.02	4 R	6:46.20	1 FA	—N/a				6:21.52	4
Lucy Glover; Charlotte Hodgkins-Byrne; Mathilda Hodgkins-Byrne; Hannah Scott	Quadruple sculls	6:20.80	3 R	6:42.97	4 FB	—N/a				6:25.14	7
Chloe Brew; Katherine Douglas; Rebecca Edwards; Emily Ford; Fiona Gammond; Caragh McMurtry; Rebecca Muzerie; Sara Parfett; Matilda Horn (cox)	Eight	6:26.75	4 R	6:05.26	5	—N/a				Did not advance	

Qualification Legend: FA=Final A (medal); FB=Final B (non-medal); FC=Final C (non-medal); FD=Final D (non-medal); FE=Final E (non-medal); FF=Final F (non-medal); SA/B=Semifinals A/B; SC/D=Semifinals C/D; SE/F=Semifinals E/F; QF=Quarterfinals; R=Repechage

== Rugby sevens ==
In international competition the constituent nations of Great Britain ordinarily compete as separate unions representing England, Scotland and Wales. Northern Irish players who normally represent Ireland would have been eligible however the IRFU insisted that they do not play for Great Britain.

For the purposes of qualification for the 2020 Olympics the three British unions agreed in advance of the 2017–18 men's and women's Sevens World Series that their highest-finishing teams in that season would represent all three unions in the first stage of qualification during the 2018–19 series. The England men's and women's teams earned the right to represent the British unions in that stage of their respective competitions, but failed to qualify for the Olympic events through a top four finish.

As a result, England took part in the Rugby Europe Olympic qualification events for both men and women.

Summary

Team	Event	Pool Stage				Quarterfinal	Semifinal	Final / BM	
Team	Event	Opposition Score	Opposition Score	Opposition Score	Rank	Opposition Score	Opposition Score	Opposition Score	Rank
Great Britain (men)	Men's tournament	Canada; W 24–0	Japan; W 34–0	Fiji; L 7–33	2 Q	United States; W 26–21	New Zealand; L 7–29	Argentina; L 12–17	4
Great Britain (women)	Women's tournament	ROC; W 14–12	New Zealand; L 21–26	Kenya; W 31–0	2 Q	United States; W 21–12	France; L 19–26	Fiji; L 12–21	4

=== Men's tournament ===
The England men's team secured a qualifying berth for Great Britain at the Olympics by winning the 2019 Rugby Europe Sevens Olympic Qualifying Tournament, defeating France in the final. The British Olympic Association will select a team of twelve from the three home nations to represent Great Britain at the Games.

Squad

Great Britain's 12-man squad plus one alternate was named on 6 July 2021.

Head coach: Simon Amor

No.	Pos.	Player	Country	Date of birth (age)	Events	Points
1	BK	Max McFarland	Scotland	13 July 1993 (aged 28)	26	360
2	FW	Ben Harris	England	8 September 1999 (aged 21)	9	70
3	FW	Alex Davis	England	3 October 1992 (aged 28)	24	172
4	BK	Dan Norton	England	22 March 1988 (aged 33)	90	1,784
5	FW	Ross McCann	Scotland	30 October 1997 (aged 23)	16	44
6	BK	Tom Mitchell (c)	England	22 July 1989 (aged 32)	63	1,593
7	BK	Dan Bibby	England	6 February 1991 (aged 30)	54	704
8	FW	Alec Coombes	Scotland	26 November 1995 (aged 25)	16	85
9	BK	Ollie Lindsay-Hague	England	8 October 1990 (aged 30)	40	385
10	BK	Robbie Fergusson	Scotland	30 August 1993 (aged 27)	25	347
11	FW	Ethan Waddleton	England	23 November 1996 (aged 24)	29	40
12	BK	Harry Glover	England	31 December 1995 (aged 25)	20	95
13	BK	Tom Bowen	England	31 January 1993 (aged 28)	49	465

Group play

Pos	Team	Pld	W	D	L	PF	PA	PD	Pts	Qualification
1	Fiji	3	3	0	0	85	40	+45	9	Quarter-finals
2	Great Britain	3	2	0	1	65	33	+32	7	Quarter-finals
3	Canada	3	1	0	2	50	64	−14	5	Quarter-finals
4	Japan (H)	3	0	0	3	31	94	−63	3	

Source: Tokyo 2020 and World Rugby
Rules for classification: 1) Points; 2) Head-to-head result; 3) Point difference; 4) Points scored.
(H) Hosts

26 July 2021
9:30

Great Britain	24–0	Canada
Try: Norton (2) 7' c, 8' m McCann 11' c Fergusson 7' m Con: Bibby (2/3) 7', 12'; Fergusson (0/1)	(Tokyo 2020)

Tokyo Stadium, Tokyo
Attendance: 0
Referee: James Doleman (New Zealand)

26 July 2021
16:30

Great Britain	34–0	Japan
Try: Bibby 1' m Mitchell 2' m Glover 7' c Harris 8' m Waddleton 9' m Davis 12' c Con: Bibby (2/6) 7', 12'	(Tokyo 2020)

Tokyo Stadium, Tokyo
Attendance: 0
Referee: Paulo Duarte (Portugal)

27 July 2021
9:30

Fiji	33–7	Great Britain
Try: Tuivuaka (2) 2' m, 8' c Maqala 3' c Wainiqolo 7' c Tuimaba 14' c Con: Bolaca (3/4) 4', 7', 8'; Nasoko (1/1) 14'	(Tokyo 2020)	Try: Harris 10' c Con: Bibby (1/1) 10'

Tokyo Stadium, Tokyo
Attendance: 0
Referee: James Doleman (New Zealand)

Quarterfinal

27 July 2021
18:00

Great Britain	26–21	United States
Try: Lindsay-Hague 6' c Harris 8' c Davis 10' c Norton 11' m Con: Bibby (3/4) 7', 8', 10'	(Tokyo 2020)	Try: Barrett 1' c Baker (2) 3' c, 4' c Con: Hughes (3/3) 1', 3', 4'

Tokyo Stadium, Tokyo
Attendance: 0
Referee: James Doleman (New Zealand)

Semifinal

28 July 2021
11:00

New Zealand	29–7	Great Britain
Try: Curry (2) 2' c, 13' m Ware (2) 7' c, 9' m Collier 10' m Con: Knewstubb (2/4) 2', 7'; McGarvey-Black (0/1)	(Tokyo 2020)	Try: Norton 3' c Con: Bibby (1/1) 3'

Tokyo Stadium, Tokyo
Attendance: 0
Referee: Damon Murphy (Australia)

Bronze medal match

28 July 2021
17:30

Great Britain	12–17	Argentina (bronze)
Try: Harris 1' m Lindsay-Hague 9' c Con: Bibby (1/2) 10'	(Tokyo 2020)	Try: Bazán 4' m Moneta 5' c Mendy 11' m Con: Mare (1/3) 6'

Tokyo Stadium, Tokyo
Attendance: 0
Referee: James Doleman (New Zealand)

=== Women's tournament ===
The England women's team secured a qualifying berth for Great Britain at the Olympics by winning the 2019 Rugby Europe Women's Sevens Olympic Qualifying Tournament, defeating Russia in the final. The British Olympic Association will select a team of twelve from the three home nations to represent Great Britain at the Games.

Squad

Great Britain's squad of 13 players was named on 18 June 2021.

Head coach: Scott Forrest

- (England) Holly Aitchison
- (England) Abbie Brown (c)
- (England) Abi Burton
- (England) Deborah Fleming
- (England) Natasha Hunt
- (England) Megan Jones (c)
- (Wales) Jasmine Joyce
- (England) Alex Matthews
- (England) Celia Quansah
- (England) Helena Rowland
- (Scotland) Hannah Smith
- (Scotland) Lisa Thomson
- (England) Emma Uren

Group play

Pos	Team	Pld	W	D	L	PF	PA	PD	Pts	Qualification
1	New Zealand	3	3	0	0	88	28	+60	9	Quarter-finals
2	Great Britain	3	2	0	1	66	38	+28	7	Quarter-finals
3	ROC	3	1	0	2	47	59	−12	5	Quarter-finals
4	Kenya	3	0	0	3	19	95	−76	3	

Source: Tokyo 2020 and World Rugby
Rules for classification: 1) Points; 2) Head-to-head result; 3) Point difference; 4) Points scored.

29 July 2021
11:00

ROC	12–14	Great Britain
Try: Khamidova 1' m Seredina 12' c Con: Seredina (1/2) 13'	(Tokyo 2020)	Try: Brown (2) 4' c, 14' +1 c Con: Aitchison (2/2) 4', 14' +1

Tokyo Stadium, Tokyo

29 July 2021
18:30

New Zealand	26–21	Great Britain
Try: Blyde (3) 5' c, 7' m, 13' c Nathan-Wong 9' c Con: Nathan-Wong (3/4) 6', 9', 14'	(Tokyo 2020)	Try: Rowland 1' c Jones 2' c Joyce 4' c Con: Aitchison (3/3) 1', 3', 4'

Tokyo Stadium, Tokyo

30 July 2021
11:00

Great Britain	31–0	Kenya
Try: Joyce (2) 1' c, 6' m Burton 3' m Jones 9' c Thomson 14' c Con: Hunt (1/3) 2'; Rowland (1/1) 9'; Aitchison (1/1) 14'	(Tokyo 2020)

Tokyo Stadium, Tokyo

Quarterfinal

30 July 2021
19:00 (Note: Matches were delayed by 30 minutes due to lightning in the area)

United States	12–21	Great Britain
Try: Kirshe 11' m Tapper 14' c Con: Heavirland (1/2) 14'	(Tokyo 2020)	Try: Joyce (2) 1' c, 8' c Brown 2' c Con: Aitchison (3/3) 1', 2', 8'

Tokyo Stadium, Tokyo

Semifinal

31 July 2021
11:30

Great Britain	19–26	France
Try: Joyce (2) 5' c, 7' m Smith 11' c Con: Aitchison (1/2) 6'; Hunt (1/1) 11'	(Tokyo 2020)	Try: Ciofani (2) 1' c, 8' m Okemba 3' c Bertrand 7' c Con: Drouin (2/3) 2', 3'; Ulutule (1/1) 7', 9'

Tokyo Stadium, Tokyo

Bronze medal match

31 July 2021
17:30

Fiji	21–12	Great Britain
Try: Nakoci 1' c, 6' c Ulunisau 10' c Con: Riwai (3/3) 1', 6', 10'	(Tokyo 2020)	Try: Jones 9' m, 12' c Con: Aitchison (0/1); Hunt (1/1) 12'

Tokyo Stadium, Tokyo

== Sailing ==
British sailors qualified boats in all Olympic classes at the 2018 Sailing World Championships, bringing the maximum quota of 15 sailors, in ten boats. On 1 October 2019, Team GB announced the names of the first twelve sailors selected for the Tokyo 2020 regatta, including Saskia Tidey, who previously competed for Ireland in Rio 2016, defending champions Giles Scott (Finn) and Hannah Mills (women's 470), and London 2012 silver medallists Luke Patience (men's 470) and Stuart Bithell (49er). The Nacra 17 crew (Gimson & Burnet) was added to the list of confirmed athletes for Tokyo on 24 January 2020. Laser sailor Elliot Hanson completed Team GB's sailing lineup for the Olympics on 29 February 2020.

Men

Athlete	Event	Race													Net points	Rank
Athlete	Event	1	2	3	4	5	6	7	8	9	10	11	12	M*	Net points	Rank
Tom Squires	RS:X	9	13	~~14~~	2	10	3	4	1	8	2	6	10	14	82	7
Elliot Hanson	Laser	5	12	17	10	3	28	7	20	2	~~DSQ~~	—N/a		EL	104	12
Giles Scott	Finn	~~9~~	9	1	1	1	1	6	1	1	7	—N/a		8	36	1st place, gold medalist(s)
Chris Grube; Luke Patience	470	3	8	2	4	~~10~~	5	9	6	7	10	—N/a		16	70	5
Stuart Bithell; Dylan Fletcher	49er	2	8	4	1	12	2	2	~~16~~	3	9	6	7	2	58	1st place, gold medalist(s)

Women

Athlete	Event	Race													Net points	Rank
Athlete	Event	1	2	3	4	5	6	7	8	9	10	11	12	M*	Net points	Rank
Emma Wilson	RS:X	5	2	6	1	4	2	1	1	~~UFD~~	6	1	5	4	38	3rd place, bronze medalist(s)
Alison Young	Laser Radial	24	8	9	20	12	12	10	8	14	~~27~~	—N/a		16	133	10
Eilidh McIntyre; Hannah Mills	470	4	3	7	1	3	3	1	3	~~9~~	3	—N/a		10	38	1st place, gold medalist(s)
Charlotte Dobson; Saskia Tidey	49erFX	1	1	6	4	2	5	16	13	14	15	4	~~18~~	14	95	6

Mixed

Athlete	Event	Race													Net points	Rank
Athlete	Event	1	2	3	4	5	6	7	8	9	10	11	12	M*	Net points	Rank
John Gimson; Anna Burnet	Nacra 17	7	5	2	1	1	2	5	~~10~~	1	5	2	4	10	45	2nd place, silver medalist(s)

M = Medal race; DSQ = Disqualification; EL = Eliminated – did not advance into the medal race; UFD = "U" Flag disqualification

== Shooting ==
British shooters achieved quota places for the following events by virtue of their best finishes at the 2018 ISSF World Championships, the 2019 ISSF World Cup series, European Championships or Games, and European Qualifying Tournament, as long as they obtained a minimum qualifying score (MQS) by 31 May 2020. On 13 January 2021, Team GB announced the selection of four athletes to fill the quotas secured by the team to date. Amber Hill secured a quota in the women's skeet after finishing at the top of the qualifying rankings for that event by winning the ISSF World Cup in New Delhi on 21 March 2021. On 27 May 2021, Hill secured a quota for Team GB by winning the bronze medal at the 2021 European Shooting Championships in Osijek, Croatia, superseding the earlier quota she had won and releasing it to a shooter from another NOC. On 15 June 2021, Team GB confirmed that Hill had been selected for Tokyo. On 21 July, the British Olympic Association confirmed that Hill, having failed a COVID-19 test before flying to Tokyo, had been forced to withdraw from the Games.

Matthew Coward-Holley, won Britain's only shooting medal of the Games, a bronze in the men's trap. The reigning European and World champion, who had twice broken his back playing rugby as a teenager, missed his first three targets but then hit 14 in a row to secure the bronze medal.

Athlete	Event	Qualification		Semifinal		Final	
Athlete	Event	Points	Rank	Points	Rank	Points	Rank
Matthew Coward-Holley	Men's trap	123 (+21)	2 Q	—N/a		33	3rd place, bronze medalist(s)
Aaron Heading	Men's trap	119	23	—N/a		Did not advance	
Kirsty Hegarty	Women's trap	116	16	—N/a		Did not advance	
Amber Hill	Women's skeet	DNS		—N/a		Did not advance	
Seonaid McIntosh	Women's 10 m air rifle	627.2	12	—N/a		Did not advance	
Seonaid McIntosh	Women's 50 m rifle 3 positions	1167	14	—N/a		Did not advance	
Matthew Coward-Holley; Kirsty Hegarty	Mixed trap team	143	10	Did not advance			

== Skateboarding ==
Great Britain entered two skateboarders to compete across all events at the Games. Sky Brown and Bombette Martin qualified among the top 16 eligible skateboarders in the women's park, respectively, based on the World Skate Olympic Rankings of 30 June 2021. On 1 July 2021, Team GB announced the selection of both athletes to represent the team in Tokyo.

Athlete	Event	Heat		Final	
Athlete	Event	Score	Rank	Score	Rank
Sky Brown	Women's park	57.40	2 Q	56.47	3rd place, bronze medalist(s)
Bombette Martin	Women's park	16.21	18	Did not advance	

== Sport climbing ==
Great Britain entered one sport climber into the Olympic tournament. Shauna Coxsey qualified directly for the women's combined event, by advancing to the final stage and securing one of the seven provisional berths at the 2019 IFSC World Championships in Hachioji, Japan. On 11 February 2020, Team GB confirmed Coxsey's selection for Tokyo.

Athlete	Event	Qualification									Final								
Athlete	Event	Speed		Boulder		Lead			Total	Rank	Speed		Boulder		Lead			Total	Rank
Athlete	Event	Best	Place	Result	Place	Hold	Time	Place	Total	Rank	Best	Place	Result	Place	Hold	Time	Place	Total	Rank
Shauna Coxsey	Women's	9.65	16	2T4z 3 4	4	21+	2:23	13	832.00	10	Did not advance								

== Swimming ==
British swimmers must qualify by finishing in the top two of the Olympic trials, gaining the GB qualifying A standard set by British Swimming in the relevant final (that time being the fastest time of the sixteenth fastest swimmer internationally in that event in 2019). The standard is typically well in advance of the qualification time set by the international federation FINA; therefore, the number and identity of swimmers who will represent Great Britain will not be known until the period concludes. British Swimming have set a maximum of 35 swimmers for the team, although one swimmer may swim in multiple events.

All selected British swimmers must further achieve the qualifying standards in the events (up to a maximum of 2 swimmers in each event at the Olympic Qualifying Time (OQT), and potentially 1 at the Olympic Selection Time (OST)):

Great Britain may also enter a team for relay events with a top 12 finish at the 2019 FINA World Championships, or having one of the four best times of a team outside that top 12 in a relay event. At the 2019 Championships, Great Britain secured 5 top 12 finishes out of 7 relay events, including the full set of male and mixed relay events, thus confirming Great Britain's first guaranteed places in the pool for Tokyo 2020.

On 20 January 2021, British Swimming announced that following a change of selection policy to deal with the COVID-19 pandemic, four male swimmers who won individual medals at the 2019 World Aquatics Championships would be pre-selected for their respective events, including the current Olympic champion and world record holder Adam Peaty in the men's 100 m breaststroke.

On 17 April 2021, Team GB and British Swimming announced a further 24 swimmers would join the team, consisting of all the swimmers who had met the Olympic Consideration Time in any event at the National Trials, plus two further swimmers who had met the consideration time in the men's 200 metre freestyle, and were thus considered for the men's 4 × 200 metre freestyle relay squad. Following the 2021 European Aquatics Championships. and Glasgow Open Swimming Meet, two further swimmers, Lucy Hope and Laura Stephens, were added to the final squad of thirty. Due to possible scheduling conflicts, Great Britain returned a quota place in the Women's 4 × 200 m freestyle relay, which was then reallocated to Brazil.

In June 2021, Hector Pardoe and Alice Dearing won quotas in the men's and women's 10 km marathon by virtue of finishing first and fourth respectively in the final qualifying event in Setúbal, Portugal. On 25 June, Team GB confirmed their selection for Tokyo. Dearing becomes the first black female swimmer to compete for Team GB at the Olympics.

During the competition Adam Peaty won Team GB's first gold medal of the Games and became the first British swimmer to successfully defend an Olympic title, winning the men's 100 m breaststroke. In the men's 200 m freestyle Tom Dean won the gold medal with teammate Duncan Scott taking silver, the first time since 1908 that two male British swimmers had won medals in the same event. Dean then won a second gold medal, alongside Scott, James Guy and Matt Richards as Great Britain won the 4 × 200 m freestyle relay.

Men

Athlete	Event	Heat		Semifinal		Final	
Athlete	Event	Time	Rank	Time	Rank	Time	Rank
Ben Proud	50 m freestyle	21.93	13 Q	21.67	=5 Q	21.72	=5
Matt Richards	100 m freestyle	DNS		Did not advance			
Jacob Whittle	100 m freestyle	48.44	16 Q	48.11	13	Did not advance	
Tom Dean	200 m freestyle	1:45.24	3 Q	1:45.34	4 Q	1:44.22 NR	1st place, gold medalist(s)
Duncan Scott	200 m freestyle	1:45.37	5 Q	1:44.60	1 Q	1:44.26	2nd place, silver medalist(s)
Kieran Bird	400 m freestyle	3:48.55	20	—N/a		Did not advance	
Kieran Bird	800 m freestyle	7:57.53	25	—N/a		Did not advance	
Daniel Jervis	1500 m freestyle	14:50.22	5 Q	—N/a		14:55.48	5
Luke Greenbank	100 m backstroke	53.79	17	Did not advance			
Luke Greenbank	200 m backstroke	1:54.63	1 Q	1:54.98	2 Q	1:54.72	3rd place, bronze medalist(s)
Brodie Williams	200 m backstroke	1:57.48	12 Q	1:57.73	15	Did not advance	
Adam Peaty	100 m breaststroke	57.56	1 Q	57.63	1 Q	57.37	1st place, gold medalist(s)
James Wilby	100 m breaststroke	58.99	6 Q	59.00	6 Q	58.96	5
Ross Murdoch	200 m breaststroke	2:09.95	16 Q	2:09.97	=12	Did not advance	
James Wilby	200 m breaststroke	2:09.70	15 Q	2:07.91	2 Q	2:08.19	6
James Guy	100 m butterfly	DNS		Did not advance			
Jacob Peters	100 m butterfly	52.07	=24	Did not advance			
Joe Litchfield	200 m individual medley	2:00.11	34	Did not advance			
Duncan Scott	200 m individual medley	1:57.39	=5 Q	1:56.69	2 Q	1:55.28	2nd place, silver medalist(s)
Max Litchfield	400 m individual medley	4:10.20	8 Q	—N/a		4:10.58	=4
Brodie Williams	400 m individual medley	4:17.27	21	—N/a		Did not advance	
James Guy; Matt Richards; Joe Litchfield; Jacob Whittle	4 × 100 m freestyle relay	3:13.17	9	—N/a		Did not advance	
Tom Dean; James Guy; Calum Jarvis^{[b]} Matt Richards; Duncan Scott	4 × 200 m freestyle relay	7:03.25	1 Q	—N/a		6:58.58 ER	1st place, gold medalist(s)
Luke Greenbank; James Guy; Duncan Scott; Adam Peaty; James Wilby^{[b]}	4 × 100 m medley relay	3:37.43	2 Q	—N/a		3:27.51 EU	2nd place, silver medalist(s)
Hector Pardoe	10 km open water	—N/a				DNF	

Women

Athlete	Event	Heat		Semifinal		Final	
Athlete	Event	Time	Rank	Time	Rank	Time	Rank
Anna Hopkin	50 m freestyle	DNS		Did not advance			
Freya Anderson	100 m freestyle	53.61	14 Q	53.53	11	Did not advance	
Anna Hopkin	100 m freestyle	52.75	3 Q	53.11	8 Q	52.83	7
Freya Anderson	200 m freestyle	1:56.96	11 Q	1:57.10	12	Did not advance	
Kathleen Dawson	100 m backstroke	58.69	4 Q	58.56	5 Q	58.70	6
Cassie Wild	100 m backstroke	59.99	14 Q	1:00.20	=14	Did not advance	
Cassie Wild	200 m backstroke	2:12.93	21	Did not advance			
Sarah Vasey	100 m breaststroke	1:06.61	11 Q	1:06.87	11	Did not advance	
Molly Renshaw	200 m breaststroke	2:22.99	6 Q	2:22.70	7 Q	2:22.65	6
Abbie Wood	200 m breaststroke	2:24.13	15 Q	2:22.35	6 Q	2:23.72	7
Harriet Jones	100 m butterfly	58:73	21	Did not advance			
Laura Stephens	200 m butterfly	2:09.00	7 Q	2:09.49	10	Did not advance	
Alys Thomas	200 m butterfly	2:09.06	8 Q	2:09.07	8 Q	2:07.90	7
Alicia Wilson	200 m individual medley	2:10.39	9 Q	2:10.59	8 Q	2:12.86	8
Abbie Wood	200 m individual medley	2:09.94	3 Q	2:09.56	2 Q	2:09.15	4
Aimee Willmott	400 m individual medley	4:35.28	2 Q	—N/a		4:38.30	7
Freya Anderson; Lucy Hope; Anna Hopkin; Abbie Wood	4 × 100 m freestyle relay	3:34.03 NR	4 Q	—N/a		3:33.96 NR	5
Freya Anderson; Harriet Jones; Sarah Vasey; Cassie Wild	4 × 100 m medley relay	3:58.12	9	—N/a		Did not advance	
Alice Dearing	10 km open water	—N/a				2:05:03.2	19

Mixed

Athlete	Event	Heat		Final	
Athlete	Event	Time	Rank	Time	Rank
Freya Anderson^{[b]} Kathleen Dawson; James Guy; Anna Hopkin; Adam Peaty	4 × 100 m medley relay	3:38.75 OR	1 Q	3:37.58 WR	1st place, gold medalist(s)

^{b} Swimmers who participated in the heats only.

== Table tennis ==
Great Britain entered three athletes into the table tennis competition at the Games. Two-time Olympian Liam Pitchford and double Commonwealth Games medallist Tin-Tin Ho were automatically selected among the top ten table tennis players vying for qualification in their respective singles events based on the ITTF Olympic Rankings of 1 June 2021. Ho becomes the first British female table tennis player to compete at the Games since 1996. On 7 July 2021, Paul Drinkhall was granted a reallocated quota for the men's singles.

Athlete	Event	Preliminary	Round 1	Round 2	Round 3	Round of 16	Quarterfinals	Semifinals	Final / BM	
Athlete	Event	Opposition Result	Opposition Result	Opposition Result	Opposition Result	Opposition Result	Opposition Result	Opposition Result	Opposition Result	Rank
Liam Pitchford	Men's singles	Bye			Jorgić (SLO); L 2–4	Did not advance				
Paul Drinkhall	Men's singles	Bye	Alamian (IRI); W 4–1	Gardos (AUT); W 4–1	Jang W-j (KOR); L 1–4	Did not advance				
Tin-Tin Ho	Women's singles	Bye	Batra (IND); L 1–4	Did not advance						

== Taekwondo ==
Great Britain will enter a squad of five athletes into the taekwondo competition for the first time at the Games. Two-time defending Olympic champion Jade Jones (women's 57 kg), 2019 world champions Bradly Sinden (men's 68 kg) and Bianca Walkden (women's +67 kg), and former European and world junior champion Lauren Williams (women's 67 kg) qualified directly for their respective weight classes by finishing among the top five taekwondo practitioners in the WT Olympic Rankings at the end of the qualification period. With the 2019 World Taekwondo Grand Slam winner already qualified through the rankings, 2019 world silver medallist and Grand Slam Series runner-up Mahama Cho (men's +80 kg) secured a fifth and final spot for Great Britain, as the next highest-placed eligible taekwondo practitioner. As Great Britain have achieved two quota places or more in each sex, they will not be eligible for any further places through remaining continental or global qualification routes. On 1 June 2021, Team GB confirmed the selection of the five athletes who had secured qualification for Tokyo.

Athlete	Event	Qualification	Round of 16	Quarterfinals	Semifinals	Repechage	Final / BM	
Athlete	Event	Opposition Result	Opposition Result	Opposition Result	Opposition Result	Opposition Result	Opposition Result	Rank
Bradly Sinden	Men's −68 kg	Bye	Burns (NZL); W 53–8 PTG	Reçber (TUR); W 39–19	Zhao S (CHN); W 33–25	Bye	Rashitov (UZB); L 29–34	2nd place, silver medalist(s)
Mahama Cho	Men's +80 kg	—N/a	Sun Hy (CHN); L 4–7 GP	Did not advance				
Jade Jones	Women's −57 kg	Bye	Alizadeh (EOR); L 12–16	Did not advance				
Lauren Williams	Women's −67 kg	—N/a	Paseka (TGA); W RSC	Wahba (EGY); W 15–12	Gbagbi (CIV); W 24–18	Bye	Jelić (CRO); L 22–25	2nd place, silver medalist(s)
Bianca Walkden	Women's +67 kg	—N/a	Bye	Deniz (KAZ); W 17–7	Lee D-b (KOR); L 24–25	Bye	Kowalczuk (POL); W 7–3	3rd place, bronze medalist(s)

== Tennis ==
On 24 June 2021, Team GB announced the selection of the six players who will represent the team in Tokyo. The most notable selection was that of defending singles champion and double gold medallist Andy Murray. In addition to these players Cameron Norrie also qualified through the rankings but declined the opportunity to attend the Games due to other professional commitments, while Kyle Edmund was recovering from surgery. Mixed doubles pairings are decided on rankings only when all players have been chosen, but Team GB are expected to be able to select a mixed doubles pair based on rankings.

On 13 July, Johanna Konta was forced to withdraw from the squad as a result of being diagnosed with SARS‑CoV‑2. This left Heather Watson as the only female player in the squad, and meant that, in the absence of a potential replacement (no British woman being ranked high enough to qualify), there would be no entry in the Women's doubles tournament. On 14 July, Dan Evans withdrew from both men's singles and men's doubles due to a positive COVID-19 test. The following day it was announced that Jamie Murray would replace Evans as Neal Skupski's partner in the men's doubles. After further withdrawals from the men's singles event Liam Broady secured a place in the tournament based on his world ranking. On 25 July, Andy Murray withdrew from the men's singles due to a thigh strain and was replaced in the draw by Australian Max Purcell; Murray decided to continue his participation in the doubles.

Athlete	Event	Round of 64	Round of 32	Round of 16	Quarterfinals	Semifinals	Final / BM	
Athlete	Event	Opposition Score	Opposition Score	Opposition Score	Opposition Score	Opposition Score	Opposition Score	Rank
Liam Broady	Men's singles	Cerúndolo (ARG); W 7–5, 6–7^{(4–7)}, 6–2	Hurkacz (POL); W 7–5, 3–6, 6–3	Chardy (FRA); L 6–7^{(3–7)}, 6–4, 1–6	Did not advance			
Andy Murray; Joe Salisbury	Men's doubles	—N/a	Herbert/ Mahut (FRA); W 6–3, 6–2	Krawietz/ Pütz (GER); W 6–2, 7–6^{(7–2)}	Čilić/ Dodig (CRO); L 6–4, 6–7^{(2–7)}, [7–10]	Did not advance		
Jamie Murray; Neal Skupski	Men's doubles	—N/a	Molteni/ Zeballos (ARG); W 6–7^{(3–7)}, 6–4, [13–11]	McLachlan/ Nishikori (JPN); L 3–6, 4–6	Did not advance			
Heather Watson	Women's singles	Friedsam (GER); L 6–7^{(5–7)}, 3–6	Did not advance					

== Triathlon ==
Great Britain confirmed five quota places in the triathlon events for Tokyo. British Triathlon announced the athletes to occupy four of those places on 4 November 2020, including returning medallists Jonathan Brownlee and Vicky Holland. Reigning double Olympic champion Alistair Brownlee was not confirmed in the fifth and final quota place, which remains to be filled. On 14 June 2021, Team GB announced that Alex Yee had been selected to fill the remaining place on the British triathlon squad for Tokyo.

Individual

Athlete	Event	Time						Rank
Athlete	Event	Swim (1.5 km)	Trans 1	Bike (40 km)	Trans 2	Run (10 km)	Total	Rank
Jonathan Brownlee	Men's	17:49	0:38	56.38	0:26	30.22	1:45:53	5
Alex Yee	Men's	18:09	0:38	56.17	0:27	29.44	1:45:15	2nd place, silver medalist(s)
Vicky Holland	Women's	19:12	0:48	1:05:24	0:31	34:20	2:00:10	13
Jess Learmonth	Women's	18:24	0:43	1:02:56	0:34	35:51	1:58:28	9
Georgia Taylor-Brown	Women's	18:31	0:42	1:03:11	0:34	33:52	1:56:50	2nd place, silver medalist(s)

Relay

Athlete	Event	Time						Rank
Athlete	Event	Swim (300 m)	Trans 1	Bike (7 km)	Trans 2	Run (2 km)	Total group	Rank
Jonathan Brownlee	Mixed relay	4:02	0:36	8:35	0:25	5:25	20:03	—N/a
Alex Yee	Mixed relay	4:08	0:36	9:31	0:25	5:28	20:28	—N/a
Jess Learmonth	Mixed relay	3:40	0:40	10:15	0:27	6:15	21:16	—N/a
Georgia Taylor-Brown	Mixed relay	4:23	0:38	10:16	0:30	6:07	21:54	—N/a
Total	Mixed relay	—N/a					1:23:41	1st place, gold medalist(s)

== Weightlifting ==
Four female weightlifters qualified for Great Britain, one in each of the following weight classes. Former Commonwealth Games champion Zoe Smith (women's 59 kg), European medallist Sarah Davies (women's 64 kg), and European champion Emily Campbell (women's +87 kg) secured one of the top eight slots each in their respective weight divisions based on the IWF Absolute World Rankings. On 30 June 2021, Team GB confirmed their selection for Tokyo. On 4 July 2021, Colombia confirmed they would cede the women's −76 kg quota place as part of an agreement with the IWF following multiple doping violations, thus granting Emily Muskett, European champion in the non-Olympic −71 kg category, a quota place in the event. Muskett's place on the Olympic team was confirmed by Team GB on 6 July 2021.

Athlete	Event	Snatch		Clean & Jerk		Total	Rank
Athlete	Event	Result	Rank	Result	Rank	Total	Rank
Zoe Smith	Women's −59 kg	87	8	113	6	200	8
Sarah Davies	Women's −64 kg	100	10	127	4	227	5
Emily Muskett	Women's −76 kg	98	9	124	8	222	7
Emily Campbell	Women's +87 kg	122	4	161	2	283	2nd place, silver medalist(s)

== Sports not contested by Great Britain in Tokyo ==
=== Basketball ===
Neither the men's nor the women's team qualified for the full court tournaments. The men's team were eliminated in the early stages, failing to emerge from their first-round group in qualification for the FIBA Basketball World Cup. The women's team fared much better, after a groundbreaking run to a fourth-place finish in the Women's EuroBasket tournament meant that they made the final qualification tournament in Belgrade. The team narrowly missed out on qualification at that tournament, largely due to a tight loss to South Korea, with whom they were vying for the third of three qualification places behind Spain and China.

Neither the men's nor women's 3x3 teams qualified.

=== Baseball ===
Great Britain failed to emerge from the 2019 European Baseball Championship to reach the final qualification tournament, finishing ninth.

=== Handball ===
Great Britain's 10th-place finish at the 2017 IHF Emerging Nations Championship ended their participation in qualification for the men's Olympic tournament. Great Britain did not enter a team in qualification for the women's Olympic event.

=== Karate ===
At the conclusion of the Final Karate Olympic Qualification Tournament, Great Britain had failed to advance any karateka to the Olympic Karate tournament.

=== Softball ===
Great Britain lost to Italy in the final of the combined Africa/Europe continental qualifying tournament so narrowly missing out on a place in Tokyo.

=== Surfing ===
Great Britain failed to qualify any surfers for the Games.

=== Volleyball ===
Team GB had no qualified teams in either full court or beach volleyball.

=== Water polo ===
Team GB did not qualify.

=== Wrestling ===
Great Britain did not qualify any athletes.

== See also ==
- Great Britain at the Olympics
- Great Britain at the 2020 Summer Paralympics
