= 2021 British Athletics Marathon and 20 km Walk Trial =

British 2020 Summer Olympics qualification event

Marathon at the British Athletics Trial
- Venue: Kew Gardens, London
- Dates: 26 March 2021

Champions
- Men: Chris Thompson (02:10:52)
- Women: Stephanie Davis (02:27:16)

20 km walk at the British Athletics Trial
- Venue: Kew Gardens, London
- Dates: 26 March 2021

Champions
- Men: Callum Wilkinson (01:22:47)
- Women: Heather Lewis (01:35:44)

The 2021 British Athletics Marathon and 20 km Walk Trial (known for sponsorship reasons as the Müller British Athletics Marathon and 20 km Walk Trials) was held on 26 March 2021 as a trial event for British athletes to qualify for the delayed 2020 Summer Olympics in Tokyo. It was the first time since 1980 that a dedicated marathon trial event was held, and the courses consisted of multiple laps around Kew Gardens in London.

The marathon events were won by Chris Thompson and Stephanie Davis, both of whom qualified for the Olympics as a result. The 20 km walk events were won by Callum Wilkinson and Heather Lewis, both of whom finished outside their respective Olympic qualifying times; Wilkinson was later awarded a place at the Olympics. Ben Connor and Tom Bosworth also qualified for the marathon and 20 km walk Olympic events respectively due to their finishing positions.

== Background ==
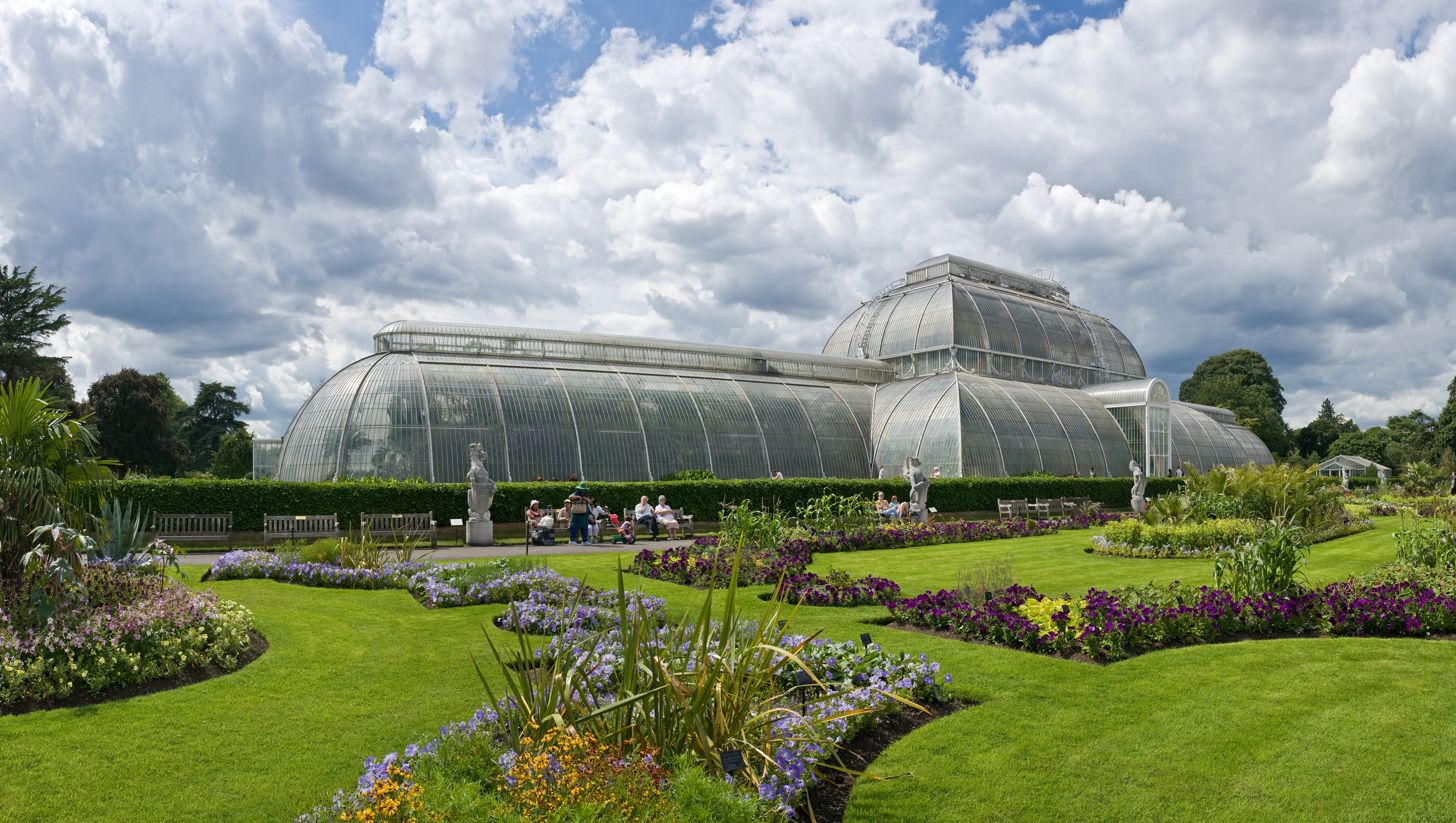
The races finished at the Palm House.

In November 2020, UK Athletics announced that a trial event for the British Olympic marathon places would be held on 26 March 2021 at Kew Gardens in London. UK Athletics had considered using the Manchester Marathon as a qualification event or holding a trial race either near Dorney Lake or outside the United Kingdom. They chose Kew Gardens due to the flatness of the location. It was the first dedicated marathon trial event since 1980, as the London Marathon is traditionally used as to determine Olympic qualification; the 2021 London Marathon was postponed until October 2021 due to the COVID-19 pandemic. Due to the pandemic, the trial event was held behind closed doors. The trial event was organised by Richmond Runfest on behalf of UK Athletics. Richmond RunFest have arranged annual running events in Richmond, London since 2013, and Kew Gardens is on the route of the races.

The marathon course consisted of a short circuit followed by 12 more laps of 2.1 miles (3.4 km) length. The finish line was by the Palm House in the Royal Botanic Gardens. The race organisers had proposed 25 different variations of courses, and the final selection was made to allow finishing times to be as quick as possible. The route included a straight section of just under 1 mile (1.6 km). The 20 km walk course consisted of multiple laps of a shorter 1 mile (1.6 km) course.

In the marathon events, the qualification times were 2:11:30 for the men's race, and 2:29:30 for the women's event. In the 20 km walk event, the men's qualification time was 1:21:00 and for women it was 1:31:00. Competitors were guaranteed selection if they met the time and were in the top two finishers; competitors could also qualify if they finished in the top two, and had attained the qualifying time at a different event since January 2019. UK Athletics then awarded any unfilled selections with competitors of their choice. All competitors also received a commemorative bonsai tree.

== Competitors ==
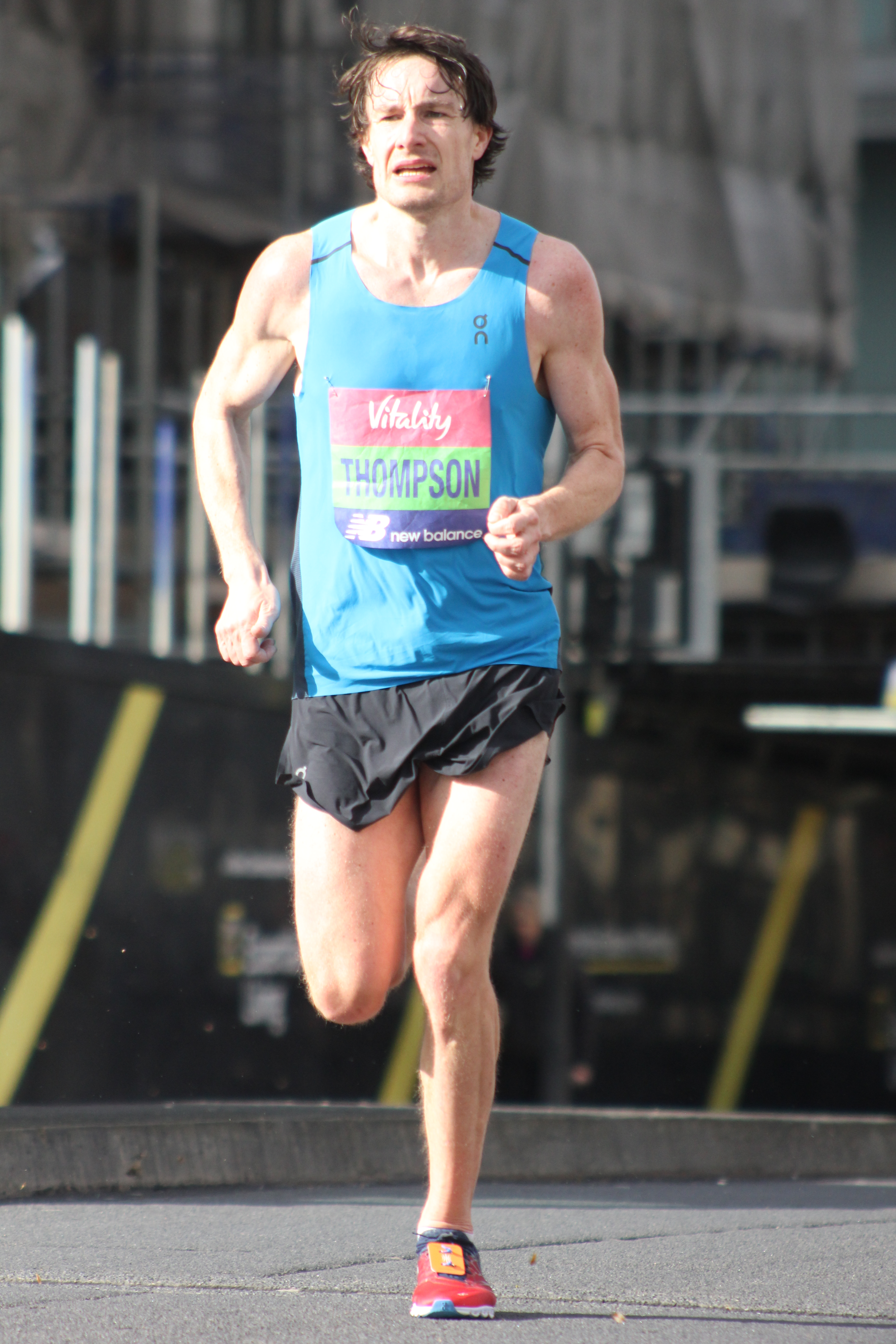
Chris Thompson won the men's marathon race.

The men's marathon race featured Ben Connor, who was the second fastest Briton at the 2020 London Marathon, and was the only athlete in the event to have already reached the Olympic qualifying standard. Dewi Griffiths had the fastest personal best time of any athletes in the event; Griffiths ran a time of 2:09:45 at the 2017 Frankfurt Marathon. Other competitors included Mo Aadan, Tom Evans, Josh Griffiths, and Chris Thompson, who had won multiple Kew Gardens 10k events. Callum Hawkins, who had already been selected for the 2020 Olympics, was chosen as a pacemaker for the race, and Jake Smith was another pacemaker. Jonny Mellor, who ran faster than the Olympic qualifying time in 2020 did not compete due to injury.

The women's marathon race included Stephanie Davis, whose personal best of 2:27:40 was the fastest of any athletes at the event. Davis was the only competitor to have already achieved the Olympic qualifying standard. Other competitors included British half-marathon champion Lily Partridge, Natasha Cockram and Naomi Mitchell, the two highest finishing Britons at the 2020 London Marathon, Sarah Inglis, Tracy Barlow, and Tish Jones. Charlie Purdue and Jess Piasecki, both of whom ran faster than the Olympic qualifying time in 2019, did not compete in the event.

Tom Bosworth and Callum Wilkinson were the favourites for the men's 20 km walk; Bosworth was the British record holder for all distances between 1 mile and 20 km, and was the only competitor to have previously reached the Olympic qualifying standard. Other competitors included Cameron Corbishley, Daniel King, and Dominic King. Less than a week before this event, Dominic King had set a British record in the 50 km walk. The race featured three debutants.

The women's 20 km walk featured Bethan Davies, who had the second fastest time by a British woman in the 3,000 metres, 5,000 metres, 10 km and 20 km walk events. She had the best 20 km walk time of any competitor in the race. The race also featured Gemma Bridge, Erika Kelly and Heather Lewis, as well as three debutants. None of the competitors had previously reached the Olympic qualifying standard.

== Race summary ==
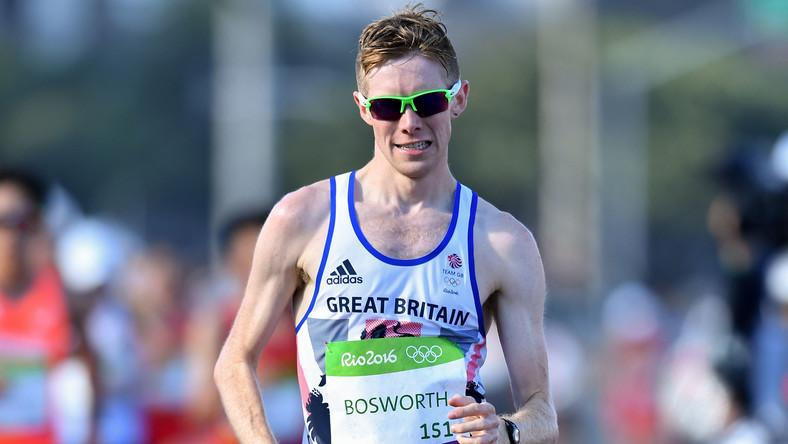
Tom Bosworth finished second in the men's 20km walk.

The 20 km walk event commenced at 06:00 UTC, and the marathon race commenced at 08:00 UTC. In both events, the men and women started simultaneously. The races were run in damp conditions.

The men's marathon race was won by 39-year-old Chris Thompson in a time of 2:10:50. His time was 40 seconds inside the qualifying standard, as well as being a personal best. Ben Connor finished second, and therefore also qualified for the Tokyo Olympics. After 30 kilometres (19 mi) of the race, Thompson was dropped from the leading pack, which contained Ben Connor, Mo Aadan, and Dewi Griffiths. At one point, Thompson was 30 seconds behind the leaders, before catching up and later rejoining the front pack. Prior to the final lap, Thompson had dropped Connor and Aadan, who were the only other runners left in the lead group. Aaden finished the race in third; it was his first competitive marathon. After the race, it was noticed that Thompson had worn the controversial Nike Vaporfly super shoe, with the branding covered up as Thompson has a different shoe sponsor.

The women's marathon race was won by Stephanie Davis in a time of 2:27:16, which was fast enough to qualify for the Tokyo Games. It was Davis' personal best time, and was inside the Olympic qualifying standard by more than two minutes. Davis ran the second half of the race in a negative split of 1:13:10. Natasha Cockram finished second in a time of 2:29:30, which was 30 seconds outside the qualifying standard, but was a personal best performance. Rosie Edwards finished third. On 1 April, it was announced that Jess Piasecki and Stephanie Twell had been given the two remaining spots for the women's marathon at the 2020 Summer Olympics.

The men's 20 km walk event was won by Callum Wilkinson, who finished in 1:22:47, which was outside the qualifying time. Wilkinson took the lead early on and maintained it throughout. After 5 kilometres (3.1 mi), he was at pace with the qualifying time, before slowing his speed due to the weather. Tom Bosworth finished second in the event, more than three minutes behind Wilkinson. Nevertheless, Bosworth qualified for the Olympics, as he had previously attained the qualifying time. Wilkinson was later awarded an Olympic place after beating the qualifying standard in June 2021.

The women's 20 km walk event was won by Heather Lewis, who finished outside the qualifying time in 1:35:44. Bethan Davies came second in the event. Lewis took the lead in the first 5 kilometres (3.1 mi) of the race, before being overtaken by Gemma Bridge. At around half race distance, Bridge was disqualified for breaking a technical rule. In June 2021, UK Athletics published its list of qualified athletes, and no British women were selected for the Olympic 20 km walk event.

== Marathon results ==
Key: Q – qualified for the 2020 Summer Olympics

=== Men ===
Men's finishers
Position	Athlete	Time
1st place, gold medalist(s)	Chris Thompson Q	02:10:52
2nd place, silver medalist(s)	Ben Connor Q	02:12:06
3rd place, bronze medalist(s)	Mohamud Aadan	02:12:20
4	Dewi Griffiths	02:13:42
5	Josh Griffiths	02:15:08
6	Robbie Simpson	02:15:26
7	Andrew Davies	02:15:50
8	Frank Baddick	02:15:58
9	Ian Leitch	02:17:26
10	Nigel Martin	02:18:09
11	Daniel Jarvis	02:32:00
12	Nicholas Bowker	02:32:45

=== Women ===
Women's finishers
Position	Athlete	Time
1st place, gold medalist(s)	Stephanie Davis Q	02:27:16
2nd place, silver medalist(s)	Natasha Cockram	02:30:03
3rd place, bronze medalist(s)	Rosie Edwards	02:31:56
4	Rebecca Gentry	02:32:01
5	Clara Evans	02:32:42
6	Sarah Inglis	02:34:09
7	Naomi Mitchell	02:37:50
8	Becky Briggs	02:38:58

== 20km walk results ==
Key: Q – qualified for the 2020 Summer Olympics

=== Men ===
Men's finishers
Position	Athlete	Time
1st place, gold medalist(s)	Callum Wilkinson Q	01:22:47
2nd place, silver medalist(s)	Tom Bosworth Q	01:26:24
3rd place, bronze medalist(s)	Guy Thomas	01:30:19
4	Daniel King	01:30:29
5	Christopher Snook	01:33:54
6	Luc Legon	01:37:01

=== Women ===
Women's finishers
Position	Athlete	Time
1st place, gold medalist(s)	Heather Lewis	01:35:44
2nd place, silver medalist(s)	Bethan Davies	01:37:04
3rd place, bronze medalist(s)	Erika Kelly	01:46:31
4	Abigail Jennings	01:49:29
