= Mark England =

British sports administrator (born 1959)

Jonathan Mark England OBE (born 29 April 1959) is a British sports administrator. He was awarded an OBE in 2017 for services to Sport.

== Early life ==
England was born in Ystalyfera in South Wales (Neath Port Talbot). He moved to Hong Kong when he was seven, attending Glenealy Junior School, and the Island School.

On his return to the UK, he attended Kenilworth Grammar School (became Kenilworth School), and South Warwickshire College of Further Education (since 1993 Stratford-upon-Avon College) in Stratford-upon-Avon.

He studied economic history at the University of Leeds, graduating in 1981. He then undertook a Diploma in Management Studies (DMS) in recreation at the University of North London, followed by a master's degree in leisure and tourism from the same university.

== Career ==
He has worked with the Sports Council (now called UK Sport) and Sport England.

=== Team GB ===
He was chef de mission of Team GB at the 2016 Olympics, being appointed on 29 April 2014. He was also chef de Mission for Team GB for the 2015 European Games (the inaugural European Games), and a deputy chef de Mission at six previous Olympic games.

He was appointed Officer of the Order of the British Empire (OBE) for services to Sport in the 2017 New Year Honours, having led the Great Britain Olympic Team to its most successful Olympic Games in modern history.

In April 2018, the British Olympic Association announced that he would be chef de Mission for the 2020 Olympics in Japan.

In March 2022, it was confirmed that he had been appointed to serve as British chef de mission for a third consecutive Olympic Games at Paris 2024.

=== Team England ===
On 19 September 2019, Commonwealth Games England announced that he had been appointed Chef de Mission for the England team at the 2022 Commonwealth Games in Birmingham.

== Personal life ==
In 1989 he married Stephanie Culham in Farnham, Surrey, with whom he has three sons. The marriage ended in divorce after 15 years in 2004. In 2008 England started a relationship with his partner Helen Other with whom he has three further sons.

== See also ==
- Stephen Park, Performance Director of British Cycling since December 2016

Sporting positions
Preceded by Andy Hunt	Chef de Mission of Team GB; April 2014 -	Succeeded by Incumbent
