= Jess Piasecki =

British long-distance runner

Personal information
- Born: 18 April 1990 (age 36)

Sport
- Country: United Kingdom
- Sport: Long-distance running

Jess Piasecki (née Coulson, born 18 April 1990) is a British long-distance runner. She competed in the senior women's race at the 2019 IAAF World Cross Country Championships held in Aarhus, Denmark. She finished in 36th place.

In 2019, she won the Ústí nad Labem Half Marathon held in Ústí nad Labem, Czech Republic. In 2019, she also won the Florence Marathon held in Florence, Italy.

She represented Great Britain at the 2020 Summer Olympics in Tokyo, Japan. She competed in the women's marathon at the 2020 Summer Olympics held in Tokyo, Japan.
