= Ben Connor =

British runner (born 1992)

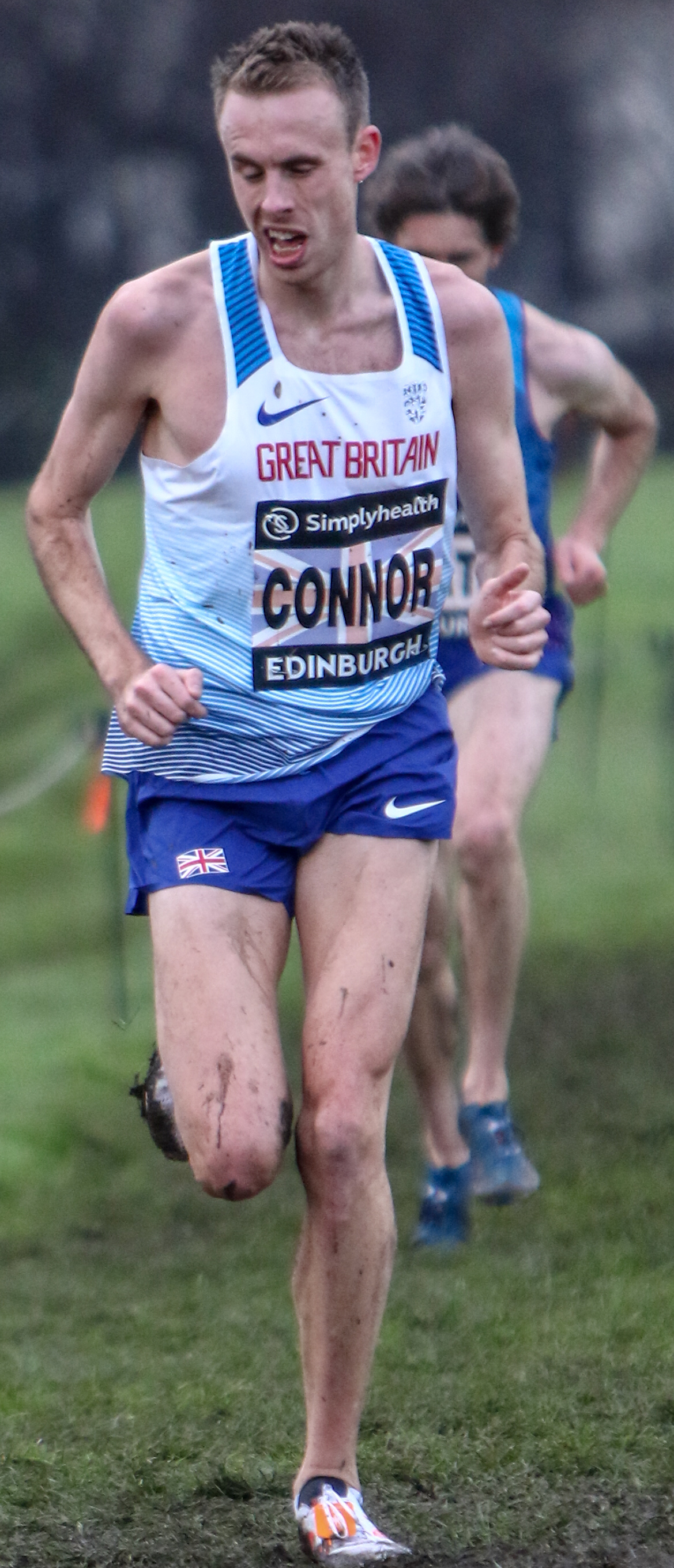
- Connor in 2018

Personal information
- Born: 17 October 1992 (age 33) Mansfield, England

Sport
- Sport: Athletics
- Club: Derby Athletics Club

Achievements and titles
- Personal best: 1:00:55 (half marathon)
Medal record
Representing Great Britain
Cross country running
English National Cross Country Championships
Gold medal – first place	2017 Nottingham	Cross country
Middle-distance running
British Athletics Championships
Gold medal – first place	2019 Highgate	10,000 m

Benjamin David Connor (born 17 October 1992) is a British runner who won the Night of 10,000m PBs event at the 2019 British Athletics Championships and the 2017 English National Cross Country Championships. Connor competed in the marathon event at the delayed 2020 Summer Olympics in Tokyo.

== Career ==
Connor is a member of Derby Athletics Club. He has trained with Ray Treacy in the US, and in Manchester, United Kingdom. From 2019, Connor has been self-coached.

In 2017, Connor won the English National Cross Country Championships. In the same year, he came sixth at the 2017 European Cross Country Championships, and fifth at the Night of 10,000m PBs race. In 2018, Connor came eighth at the Barcelona Half Marathon in a personal best time of 1:01:12. It was the eighth fastest time in history by a Briton. Connor was a favourite for the 2018 Night of 10,000m PBs race.

In 2019, Connor won the British Championships Night of 10K PBs event. In the same year, he also won the Podium 5k event, and competed in the 5,000 metres event at the 2019 World Athletics Championships. In 2020, he ran a half-marathon personal best time of 1:00:55 in Antrim. He finished third in the race, and it was the fourth fastest half marathon time by a Briton ever. Later in the year, he competed in the 2020 London Marathon, his first ever marathon event. Connor was the second highest finishing Briton in the race. He finished 10 seconds quicker than the Olympic qualifying time. Connor and Jonny Mellor had been battling for most of the race, before Mellor dropped Connor with 6 miles (9.7 km) to go to take the British winner's prize at the event. Connor finished 15th overall in the race. Later in the year, he came fourth in a cross country race in Lancashire after losing a shoe early in the event.

Connor competed at the 2021 British Athletics Marathon and 20km Walk Trial. The qualification criteria for the Olympics was to meet the qualifying time in a race since January 2019, and to finish in the top two at the trial event. He finished second in the men's marathon race, and therefore qualified for the 2020 Summer Olympics in Tokyo, Japan. Connor spent the race in the leading pack with Mo Aadan and Dewi Griffiths, but they were overtaken by Chris Thompson prior to the final lap of the race. He did not finish the Olympic marathon race. Connor finished fifth at the 2022 Night of 10,000m PBs race. He was the third British finisher.

Connor was selected for the 2025 European Road Running Championships but declined the place after UK Athletics asked him to pay towards the cost of taking part.

== Personal life ==
Connor is in a relationship with fellow runner Lily Partridge.
