= Stephanie Davis (runner) =

British marathon runner (born 1990)

Personal information
- Born: 26 August 1990 (age 35) Bearsden, Glasgow, Scotland
- Education: University of Edinburgh
- Occupation: Finance
- Years active: 2018– (Sport)

Sport
- Sport: Athletics
- University team: University of Edinburgh
- Club: Clapham Chasers

Achievements and titles
- Personal bests: 1:11:15 (Half Marathon); 2:27:16 (Marathon)

Stephanie Davis (born 26 August 1990) is a British marathon runner, who competed in the marathon event at the delayed 2020 Summer Olympics, having won the British Olympic trial event. An unsponsored, part-time athlete, Davis' main career is in finance.

== Career ==
Davis is a part-time marathon runner, and as of 2021, she did not have a sponsor. She is a member of Clapham Chasers athletics club, and has previously run for the University of Edinburgh. She is coached by Phil Kissi.

Davis' first marathon was the 2018 Berlin Marathon, which she entered with her partner and a few friends. She finished in a time of 2:41:16. She ran the 2019 London Marathon in the mass participation event and with a hip injury. She finished in 2:32:38. The same year, she recorded a personal best time of 2:27:40 at the Valencia Marathon; the time was faster than the Olympic qualification threshold. It was also the ninth fastest marathon time by a Briton ever, and the third fastest ever by a Scottish woman. Davis had been scheduled to compete at the 2020 London Marathon, until it was postponed due to the COVID-19 pandemic. It would have been her first marathon starting with the elite field. She came third in the 2020 The Big Half race, in a personal best time of 1:11:15. Later in the year, she was scheduled to compete at the 2020 World Athletics Half Marathon Championships, although she later pulled out of the event due to an injury. She had qualified to compete due to her time at The Big Half event, and it would have been her first major international event.

Davis competed at the 2021 British Athletics Marathon and 20km Walk Trial; it was her first marathon since the 2019 Valencia Marathon. She won the race by over three minutes, and she ran the second half of the race in a negative split of 1:13:10. Her finishing time of 2:27:16 was a personal best, and was over two minutes inside the Olympic qualifying time of 2:29:30. As a result, Davis qualified to compete at the 2020 Summer Olympics. At the Games, Davis finished 39th.

In April 2022, Davis was selected for the marathon event at the 2022 Commonwealth Games. It was scheduled to be her first appearance for Scotland, though she later withdrew from the squad due to a foot injury.

== Personal life ==
Davis is from Bearsden, Glasgow, Scotland. She now lives in London, England. Aside from running, Davis works in finance for Lazard, three days a week.
