= 2020 British Athletics Championships =

British Athletics Championships in 2020

- Dates: 4–5 September
- Host city: Manchester, United Kingdom
- Venue: Manchester Regional Arena
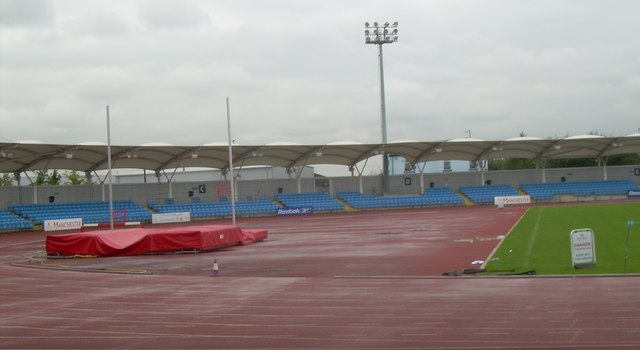
- Level: Senior
- Type: Outdoor

The 2020 British Athletics Championships (known for sponsorship reasons as the Müller British Athletics Championships) was the national championship in outdoor track and field for athletes in the United Kingdom. The championship took place on 4–5 September 2020, having been postponed from June 2020 due to the COVID-19 pandemic.

== Background ==
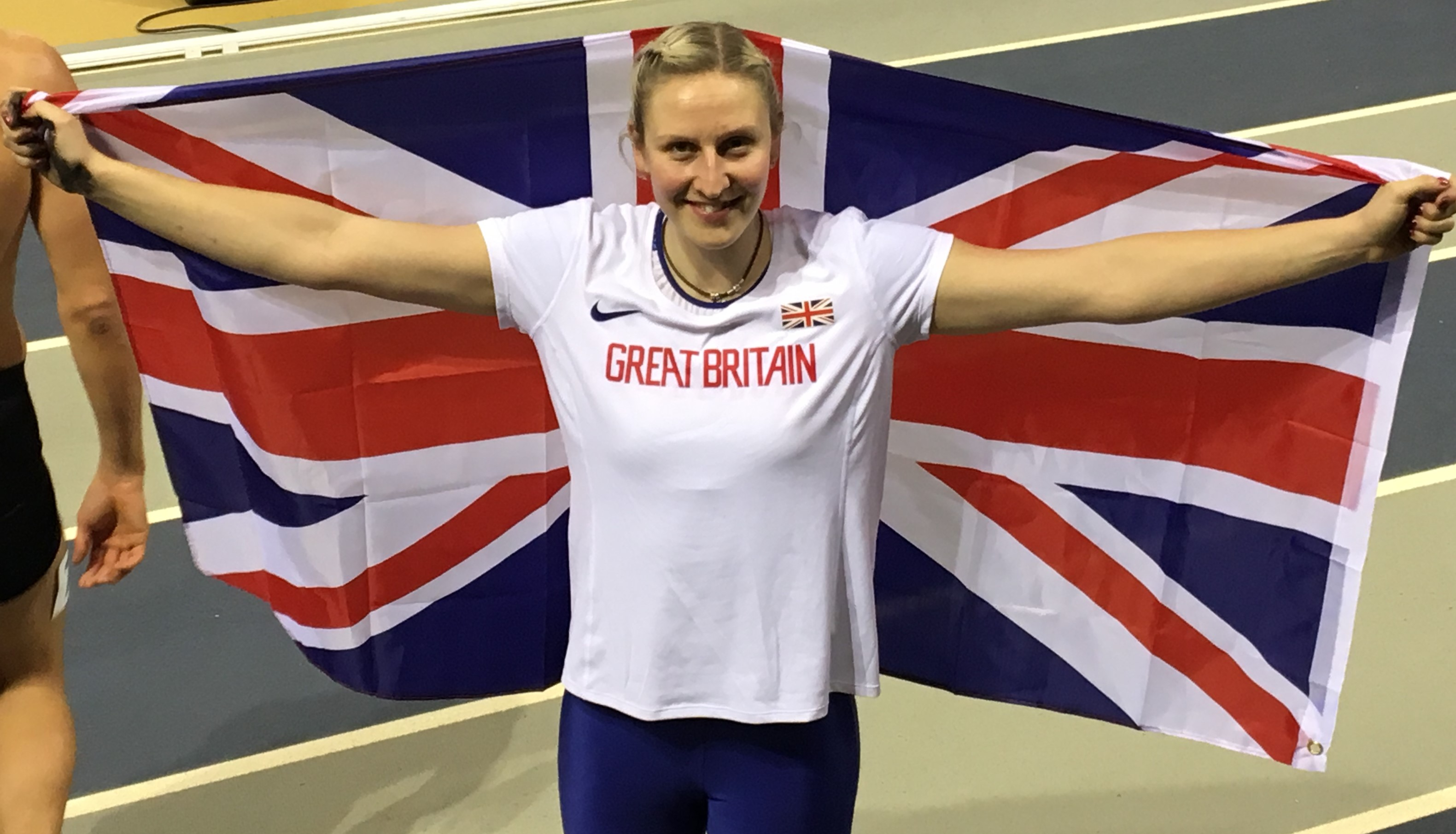
Pole vaulter Holly Bradshaw won her eighth British pole vault title at the 2020 championship.

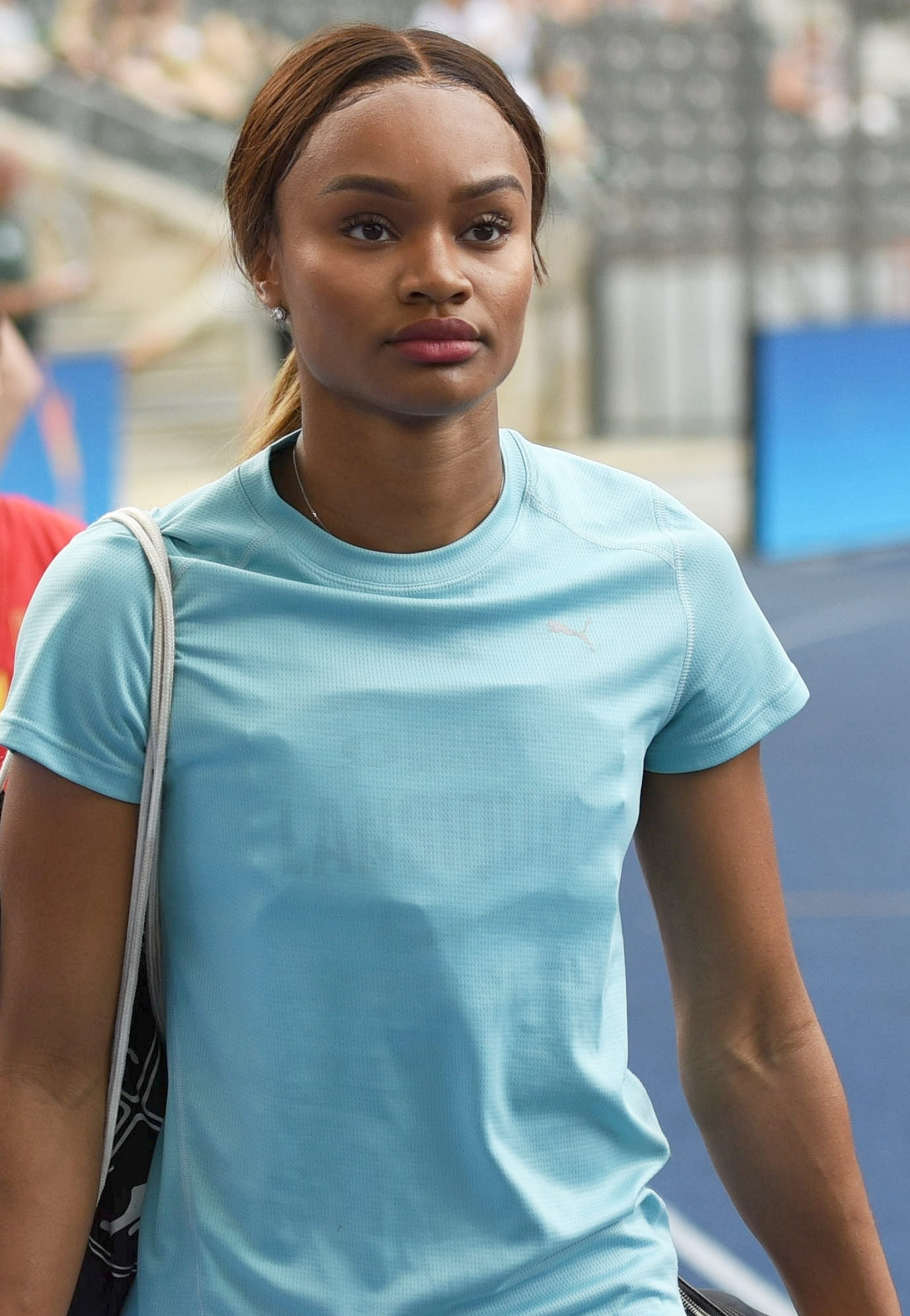
Imani-Lara Lansiquot won her first 100m title at the 2020 championship.

The championship was originally scheduled for 20–21 June 2020, but in April 2020 it was postponed until 8–9 August due to the COVID-19 pandemic. In June 2020, the event was postponed again, to 4–5 September 2020. The championship was held at the Manchester Regional Arena, as part of a three-year agreement to hold the event in Manchester from 2020 to 2022; from 2008 to 2019, the championships had been held at the Alexander Stadium in Birmingham. The entire event was held behind closed doors, due to the COVID-19 pandemic. The stadium contained cardboard cut outs of some fans. The event was originally intended as a qualifying event for the 2020 Summer Olympics. After the Olympics were postponed until 2021, the 2021 Championships were used as the Olympic qualifying event.

Almost 500 athletes competed at the championship. Notable athletes missing from the championship included Dina Asher-Smith, Mo Farah, Katarina Johnson-Thompson, and Laura Muir. Farah instead competed at the Diamond League event in Brussels, where he broke the one hour run world record. Muir instead competed in the World Athletics Continental Tour's Kamila Skolimowska Memorial event in Poland, where she won the 1500 metres race.

== Highlights ==
In the men's pole vault event, Harry Coppell broke the British national record by clearing a height of 5.85m. In the women's 3,000 metres steeplechase, Aimee Pratt set a record time at the British Athletics Championships. On 5 September, seven stadium records were set during the Championships. Hannah Taunton set the world record in the 5,000 metres T20 event, and Aimee Pratt set the year's fastest time in the 3000m steeplechase event.

The men's 800 metres event was won by Daniel Rowden in a sprint finish with Jake Wightman, who finished second. Holly Bradshaw won her eighth British pole vault title. In the absence of Dina Asher-Smith, 22-year old Imani-Lara Lansiquot won the women's 100 metres race, which was her first British title.

== Results ==
=== Men ===
Event	Gold		Silver		Bronze	
100 metres	Harry Aikines-Aryeetey; Sutton & District	10.35 SB	Ojie Edoburun; Shaftesbury	10.43	Tommy Ramdhani; Bexley	10.44
200 metres	Andrew Morgan-Harrison; Kingston upon Hull	20.69	James Williams; Liverpool	21.01	Joe Ferguson; Leeds	21.16
400 metres	Alex Knibbs; Amber Valley	46.65 PB	Niclas Baker; Crawley	46.81 SB	Toby Harries; Brighton	47.00
800 metres	Daniel Rowden; Woodford	1:45.94 SB	Jake Wightman; Edinburgh	1:46.26	Yusuf Bizimana; Victoria Park	1:47.94 PB
1500 metres	George Mills; Brighton	3:51.39	Neil Gourley; Giffnock	3:51.54	Joshua Lay; Rugby	3:51.60
5000 metres	Marc Scott; Cambridge & C	13:32.98 SB	Jack Rowe; AFD	13:37.85 PB	Tom Mortimer; Stroud	13:43.47 PB
110 metres hurdles	David King; Plymouth	13.58	Cameron Fillery; Woodford	13.83	Miguel Perera; Harrow	14.68 SB
400 metres hurdles	Alastair Chalmers; Guernsey	49.66 PB	Chris McAlister; Thames Valley	50.54	Efe Okoro; Birchfield	50.98
3000 metres steeplechase	Phil Norman; Woodford	8:32.51 SB	Mark Pearce; Shaftesbury	8:33.61 PB	Daniel Jarvis; Bedford	8:39.70 PB
5000 metres walk	Callum Wilkinson; Enfield	19:25.94 SB	Luc Legon; Bexley	22:20.12 PB	No other finishers	
Long jump	Reynold Banigo; Sale	7.81	Jack Roach; Newham	7.60	Shandell Taylor; Havering	7.45 SB
High jump	Joel Clarke-Khan; Worcester	2.18 PB	William Grimsey; Woodford	2.15 SB	Sam Brereton; Birchfield	2.15 PB
Triple jump	Nathan Douglas; Oxford	15.80 SB	Sam Trigg-Petrovic; Erme Valley	15.59	Jonathan Ilori; Blackheath	15.17
Pole vault	Harry Coppell; Wigan	5.85 NR	Adam Hague; Sheffield	5.20	Ethan Walsh; Shaftesbury	5.05 SB
Shot put	Scott Lincoln; York	19.65	Lewis Byng; Stratford-upon-Avon	16.66	George Hyde; West Cheshire	16.55 PB
Discus throw	Nicholas Percy; Shaftesbury	59.74	George Armstrong; Newham	58.48 SB	Dan Greaves; Charnwood	54.90
Hammer throw	Craig Murch; Birchfield	73.24 SB	Chris Bennett; Shaftesbury	68.84	Chris Shorthouse; Birchfield	67.26
Javelin throw	James Whiteaker; Blackheath	75.99	Daniel Bainbridge; Shaftesbury	70.50	Tom Hewson; Andover	68.49 SB
10,000 metres	Postponed due to COVID-19 pandemic					

=== Women ===
Event	Gold		Silver		Bronze	
100 metres	Imani Lansiquot; Sutton & District	11.26	Kristal Awuah; Herne Hill	11.34	Amy Hunt; Charnwood	11.35
200 metres	Hannah Williams; Herts Phoenix	23.83	Georgina Adam; Loughborough	24.06	Rebecca Jeggo; Colchester	24.51 SB
400 metres	Laviai Nielsen; Enfield	51.72 SB	Jessica Turner; Amber Valley	52.57 PB	Yasmin Liverpool; Coventry	53.21
800 metres	Keely Hodgkinson; Leigh Harriers	2:03.24	Isabelle Boffey; Enfield	2:04.73	Ellie Baker; Shaftesbury	2:04.80
1500 metres	Laura Weightman; Morpeth	4:09.76	Jessica Judd; Blackburn	4:12.35	Katie Snowden; Herne Hill	4:14.00
5000 metres	Jessica Judd; Blackburn	15:37.52 SB	Verity Ockenden; Swansea	15:41.19 SB	Amelia Quirk; Bracknell	15:43.35 PB
100 metres hurdles	Cindy Ofili; Woodford	13.16	Lucy-Jane Matthews; Birchfield	13.20 PB	Heather Paton; Birchfield	13.60
400 metres hurdles	Jessie Knight; WSE&H	55.80	Lina Nielsen; Shaftesbury	56.99 SB	Hayley McLean; Shaftesbury	57.79
3000 metres steeplechase	Aimee Pratt; Sale	9:30.73 SB	Rosie Clarke; Epsom & Ewell	9:46.31 SB	Hannah Nuttall; Charnwood	10:25.43 PB
5000 metres walk	Gemma Bridge; Oxford	22:51.15 PB	Bethan Davies; Cardiff	23:46.04 SB	Jasmine Nicholls; Leicester	24:52.89 PB
Long jump	Jazmin Sawyers; Stoke	6.69 SB	Abigail Irozuru; Sale	6.53	Rebecca Chapman; Cardiff	6.14
High jump	Morgan Lake; WSE&H	1.80	Jodie Smith; WSE&H	1.80 PB	Emily Borthwick; Wigan	1.77
Triple jump	Naomi Ogbeta; Trafford	13.44	Shanara Hibbert; Woodford	12.86	Angela Barrett; Thames Valley	12.72 SB
Pole vault	Holly Bradshaw; Blackburn	4.35 SB	Sophie Cook; Birchfield	4.25	Sophie Ashurst; Sale	3.70 SB
Shot put	Sophie McKinna; Great Yarmouth	17.88 SB	Amelia Strickler; Thames Valley	17.47	Serena Vincent; Portsmouth	15.60
Discus throw	Kirsty Law; Sale	57.95 PB	Jade Lally; Shaftesbury	57.20	Shadine Duquemin; Shaftesbury	52.52
Hammer throw	Jessica Mayho; Birchfield	65.47 SB	Charlotte Payne; Reading	63.92 PB	Alice Barnsdale; Kingston upon Hull	62.05 SB
Javelin throw	Freya Jones; Southampton	53.12 SB	Emma Hamplett; Birchfield	51.80 SB	Bethany Moule; Neath	51.27 PB
10,000 metres	Postponed due to COVID-19 pandemic					

=== Parasports – Men ===
Event	Gold		Silver		Bronze	
100 metres ambulant	Zac Shaw	11.31 SB	Thomas Young	11.32	Ola Abidogun	11.50 SB
400 metres wheelchair race	Brent Lakatos (CAN)	50.22 SB	Nathan Maguire	51.55 SB	Dillion Labrooy	55.17 SB

=== Parasports – Women ===
Event	Gold		Silver		Bronze	
100 metres ambulant	Sophie Hahn	12.80s SB	Simran Kaur	13.35s SB	Ali Smith	13.52s SB
400 metres wheelchair race	Hannah Cockroft	1:00.19	Samantha Kinghorn	1:02.20	Melanie Woods	1:02.90 PB
