= National Athletics League =

Annual athletics competition in the United Kingdom

- Sport: Athletics
- Founded: 2020
- Country: United Kingdom
- Most titles: Thames Valley Harriers (4)
- Website: official website

The National Athletics League is an annual mixed-sex track and field club competition in the United Kingdom. Established in 2019, the league has 38 member clubs.

== Competition ==
There are three divisions – premiership, championship and national one in decreasing order of status – each containing 16, 16 and 6 teams respectively. For the premiership and championship, each season is composed of three rounds plus a final. For national one division, each season is composed of four rounds. Each athlete in each discipline gains points for his or her team according to their position. At the conclusion of each meeting, the match is decided by total points for each team. Teams are then awarded points based on positions in each match, so that each team has a running total for the season. This will decide the final finishing position for each club.

== Formation of the league ==
The league was formed out of the dissolutions of the British Athletics League, which was for male athletes, and the UK Women's Athletic League at the end of 2019.

== History ==
Due to the COVID-19 pandemic, the planned inaugural season of the league did not take place in 2020. As a result of uncertainty surrounding the pandemic measures for the 2021 season, the league's organisers decided on a makeshift structure which would, among other benefits, cut down on the amount of travel needed. Due to the change in format, an improvised scoring system was decided on.

Thames Valley Harriers were winners of the Premiership in 2021 and defended their title in 2022, 2023 and 2024. The first relegations and promotions took place at the end of the 2022 season.

== Past winners ==
=== Premiership ===
Year	Winner	2nd	3rd	Ref
2021	Thames Valley Harriers	Harrow AC	Shaftesbury Barnet Harriers	
2022	Thames Valley Harriers	Blackheath & Bromley AC	Harrow AC	
2023	Thames Valley Harriers	Harrow AC	Woodford Green with Essex Ladies	
2024	Thames Valley Harriers	Harrow AC	Glasgow Jaguars	

=== Championship ===
Year	Championship	League 1	Ref
2021	Crawley AC	Yate & District AC	
2022	Crawley AC	Belgrave Harriers	
2023	Tonbridge AC	Yate & District AC	

Year	North	South	East	West	Ref
2024	Trafford AC	Tonbridge AC	Swansea Harriers	Shaftesbury Barnet Harriers	
