= UK Women's Athletic League =

Track and field athletics competition

- Sport: Athletics
- Founded: 1975
- Folded: 2019
- Country: United Kingdom
- Most titles: Sale Harriers Manchester (CofM) (23)

The UK Women's Athletics League was a women-only track and field team competition in the United Kingdom. The men's competition was known as the British Athletics League. The events were the pinnacle of the British athletic clubs league system. It was the pinnacle of the British athletic clubs league system. The competition ended after the 2019 edition, with it being replaced by the National Athletics League for the 2020 season, which was a merger of the men's and women's leagues.

== History ==
The UK Women's Athletics League was inaugurated in 1975. In 2015 it consisted of four divisions, with up to 32 teams from across the United Kingdom.

== Competition ==
There are four different divisions (Premier, Division 1, Division 2 and Division 3). Each of them has eight teams in competition, except the Division 3, with only seven teams. Every season there is a total of three matches to decide the division standings, two teams are relegated and two teams promoted for every division. In September each year a qualifying match shall be held and the leading two clubs in that match shall compete in Division 3 the following season. The qualifying match shall involve the highest placed club which wishes to compete, from each of the regional Scottish, Northern, Midland, Southern and Welsh leagues.

== Past winners ==
This table lists the top placed clubs from the top division:

Year	First	Second	Third
1975	Edinburgh Southern Harriers	Sale Harriers	Stretford AC
1976	Sale Harriers	Edinburgh Southern Harriers	Stretford AC
1977	Sale Harriers	Stretford AC	Bristol AC
1978	Sale Harriers	Stretford AC	Glasgow AC
1979	Stretford AC	Sale Harriers	Edinburgh Southern Harriers
1980	Bristol AC	Stretford AC	Sale Harriers
1981	Stretford AC	Sale Harriers	Borough of Hounslow AC
1982	Notts AC	Sale Harriers	Stretford AC
1983	Sale Harriers	Stretford AC	Notts AC
1984	Sale Harriers	Edinburgh Southern Harriers	Stretford AC
1985	Stretford AC	Edinburgh Woollen Mill AC	Sale Harriers
1986	Sale Harriers	Stretford AC	Liverpool Harriers
1987	Essex Ladies AC	Sale Harriers	Edinburgh Woollen Mill AC
1988	Essex Ladies AC	Birchfield Harriers	Sale Harriers
1989	Sale Harriers	Essex Ladies AC	Edinburgh Woollen Mill AC
1990	Sale Harriers	Essex Ladies AC	Stretford AC
1991	Sale Harriers	Essex Ladies AC	City of Glasgow AC
1992	Sale Harriers	City of Glasgow AC	Wigan & District Harriers AC
1993	City of Glasgow AC	Sale Harriers	Essex Ladies AC
1994	Sale Harriers	Trafford AC	Essex Ladies AC
1995	Sale Harriers	City of Glasgow AC	Edinburgh Woollen Mill AC
1996	Sale Harriers	Essex Ladies AC	Shaftesbury Barnet Harriers
1997	Shaftesbury Barnet Harriers	Windsor, Slough & Eton AC	Birchfield Harriers
1998	Windsor, Slough & Eton AC	Birchfield Harriers	Shaftesbury Barnet Harriers
1999	Shaftesbury Barnet Harriers	Sale Harriers	Windsor, Slough & Eton AC
2000	Sale Harriers	Shaftesbury Barnet Harriers	Windsor, Slough & Eton AC
2001	Sale Harriers	Windsor, Slough, Eton & Hounslow AC	Birchfield Harriers
2002	Sale Harriers	Windsor, Slough, Eton & Hounslow AC	Shaftesbury Barnet Harriers
2003	Sale Harriers	City of Glasgow AC	Edinburgh Woollen Mill
2004	Sale Harriers	Trafford AC	Windsor, Slough, Eton & Hounslow AC
2005	Sale Harriers	Edinburgh Southern Harriers	Trafford AC
2006	Edinburgh Southern Harriers	City of Manchester AC	Shaftesbury Barnet Harriers
2007	City of Manchester AC	Trafford AC	Edinburgh Southern Harriers
2008	City of Manchester AC	Shaftesbury Barnet Harriers	Edinburgh AC
2009	City of Manchester AC	Birchfield Harriers	Windsor, Slough, Eton & Hounslow AC
2010	City of Manchester AC	Birchfield Harriers	Windsor, Slough, Eton & Hounslow AC
2011	Birchfield Harriers	City of Manchester AC	Windsor, Slough, Eton & Hounslow AC
2012	Birchfield Harriers	Windsor, Slough, Eton & Hounslow AC	Blackheath & Bromley AC
2013	Edinburgh AC	Windsor, Slough, Eton & Hounslow AC	Trafford AC
2014	Edinburgh AC	Birchfield Harriers	Thames Valley Harriers
2015	Thames Valley Harriers	Windsor, Slough, Eton & Hounslow AC	Birchfield Harriers
2016	Birchfield Harriers	Thames Valley Harriers	Windsor, Slough, Eton & Hounslow AC
2017	Thames Valley Harriers	Birchfield Harriers	Edinburgh AC
2018	Thames Valley Harriers	Birchfield Harriers	Blackheath & Bromley AC
2019	Thames Valley Harriers	Windsor, Slough, Eton & Hounslow AC	Trafford AC

== Teams in 2019 ==
=== Premier ===
Country	Club
(England)	Birchfield Harriers
(England)	Blackheath and Bromley Harriers Athletic Club
(Wales)	Cardiff AAC
(Scotland)	Edinburgh AC
(England)	Notts AC
(England)	Thames Valley Harriers
(England)	Trafford AC
(England)	Windsor, Slough, Eton & Hounslow AC

=== Division 1 ===
Country	Club
(England)	Crawley AC
(England)	Harrow AC
(England)	Herts Phoenix AC
(England)	Shaftesbury Barnet Harriers
(England)	Southampton Athletic Club
(Wales)	Swansea Harriers
(England)	Trafford AC
(England)	Woodford Green with Essex Ladies

=== Division 2 ===
Country	Club
(England)	Bristol and West AC
(England)	City of Sheffield
(England)	Enfield and Haringay AC
(England)	Havering AC
(England)	Nene Valley Harriers
(England)	Newham and Essex Beagles
(England)	Sale Harriers
(Scotland)	Victoria Park City of Glasgow

=== Division 3 ===
Country	Club
(England)	Bedford and County AC
(England)	Belgrave Harriers
(England)	City of Liverpool AC
(England)	Herne Hill Harriers
(England)	Marshall Milton Keynes AC
(England)	Peterborough AC
(England)	Reading AC
(England)	Rugby and Northampton AC
