= London Metropolitan Cross Country League =

Metropolitan Cross Country League (Met League)
- Founded: 1966
- No. of teams: 24
- Region: London, Essex, Hertfordshire and Middlesex
- Official website: https://metleague.run/

The Metropolitan League, also referred to as the Met League, is a cross country running league in South East England formed of clubs from around London and the home counties. Formed in 1966, it is one of the oldest leagues in the country.

There are five league fixtures held in various locations between October and February. Male and female athletes aged 11 upwards compete at each fixture and there are six races which are categorised as

- under 11s,
- under 13s,
- combined under 15s and under 17s, and
- seniors and veterans.

The senior and veterans races also include divisions one, two and three.

The league as a whole is the largest in numbers in the UK, after the North Eastern Harrier League.

== History ==
The league was founded on 23 March 1966 when eight of the major London athletic clubs met at the Primrose public house in Bishopsgate to discuss cross country competition. All clubs signed up and the first fixture was held in October that year at Hainault Forest. Nine clubs entered over 260 athletes in the two races: one for seniors and juniors, the other for youths and boys. For the first five years there were only four matches per season but this expanded to five in 1971.

== Competition format ==
Athletes are awarded points dependent on their finishing position in the race. The higher the position, the more points accrued. For senior men, the total points from the top 12 athletes at a club make up their 'A' team score. The next 12 athletes to finish at that club (i.e. positions 13–24) count towards the 'B' team. For senior women only six athletes make up a team.

At the end of the season, the team with the most points is declared the champion.

Guest runners are allowed to run for a small surcharge.

== Race venues ==
The five venues are decided before the start of every season and these races are hosted by the member clubs. Whilst these can vary year on year depending on availability for the last few years these have been Claybury, Wormwood Scrubs, Uxbridge, Welwyn Garden City and Trent Park.

== Clubs ==
Clubs A-L	Clubs M-Z
Barnet & District Athletic Club	Metropolitan Police Athletic Club
Enfield and Haringey Athletic Club	Mornington Chasers
Ealing Eagles Running Club	Newham & Essex Beagles Athletic Club
Eton Manor Athletic Club	Southwark Athletic Club (formal London City)
Ealing, Southall and Middlesex Athletic Club	Shaftesbury Barnet Harriers
GoodGym Raceteam	Serpentine Running Club
Harrow Athletic Club	St Mary's Richmond Athletic Club
Herts Phoenix Athletic Club	Trent Park Running Club
Highgate Harriers	Thames Valley Harriers
Hillingdon Athletic Club	Victoria Park & Tower Hamlets Athletic Club
London Frontrunners	Woodford Green & Essex Ladies
London Heathside	

== Honours ==
=== Clubs ===
Since 1966, Thames Valley Harriers have won the most men's titles, a total of 33. Since 1994, Highgate Harriers have been the most successful women's club, winning the trophy on 21 occasions.

=== Athletes ===
Julian Gentry of Newham and Essex Beagles holds the most individual titles, a total of eight. These were won consecutively from 1989 to 1996. Svenja Abel (Highgate Harriers) has won the women's title four times, in 2004, 2006, 2009 and 2010.
