= Barnet Ladies =

Barnet Ladies may refer to:

- Barnet Ladies, that amalgamated with UK athletics club Shaftesbury Barnet Harriers
- Barnet Ladies FC, that amalgamated to form English women's football club London Bees
