= British athletic clubs league system =

The British athletic clubs league system is a series of interconnected leagues for British athletic clubs. Men and women are segregated.

== Structure ==
The British Athletics League is a national league competition for senior men, consisting of 38 clubs across five divisions. There is promotion and relegation within the league and the bottom two teams of the lowest division (Division 4) go into a qualifying competition with the top teams of the regional leagues.

The UK Women's Athletic League is a national league competition for senior women, consisting of 32 clubs across four divisions. There is promotion and relegation within the league and the bottom two teams of the lowest division (Division 4) go into a qualifying competition with the top teams of the regional leagues.

The tables below shows the current structure of the system.

== National Athletics League ==
Level	National Athletics League
1	Premiership; 16 Teams
2	Championship; 16 Teams
3	National One; 6 Teams

== Regional League Structure ==
=== England ===
Level	League(s)/Division(s)						
	North of England Track and Field League; Division East Premier; 6 Teams		North of England Track and Field League; Division West Premier; 6 Teams		Midland Track and Field League; Division 1; 6 Teams	Southern Athletics League; Division 1; 16 Teams	
	North of England Track and Field League; Division East 1 North; 6 Teams	North of England Track and Field League; Division West 1 North; 6 Teams	North of England Track and Field League; Division East 1 South; 6 Teams	North of England Track and Field League; Division West 1 South; 6 Teams	Midland Track and Field League; Division 2; 6 Teams	Southern Athletics League; Division 2 East; 16 Teams	Southern Athletics League; Division 2 West; 16 Teams
	North of England Track and Field League; Division East 2; 8 Teams		North of England Track and Field League; Division West 2; 7 Teams		Midland Track and Field League; Division 3; 6 Teams	Southern Athletics League; Division 3 East; 16 Teams	Southern Athletics League; Division 3 West; 16 Teams
					Midland Track and Field League; Division 4; 7 Teams		
					Midland Track and Field League; Division 5; 7 Teams		
					Midland Track and Field League; Division 6; 7 Teams		

=== Wales ===
Level	League(s)/Division(s)
	Welsh Athletics League; 14 Teams

=== Scotland ===
Level	League(s)/Division(s)	
	Scottish Athletics League; Division 1; 8 Teams	Scottish Women's League; 8 Teams
	Scottish Athletics League; Division 2; 9 Teams	
