= John Bicourt =

British middle-distance runner (1945–2023)

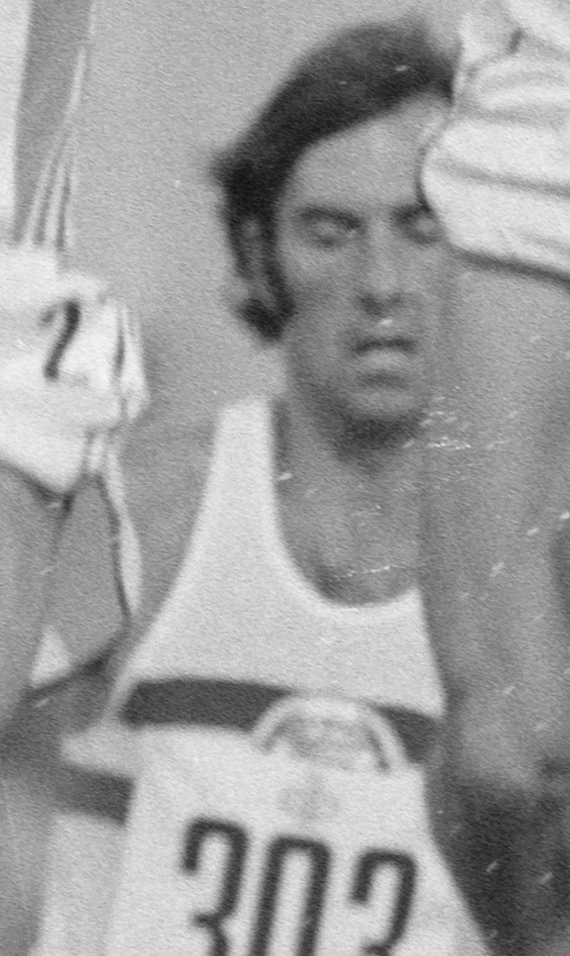
- Bicourt in 1974

Personal information
- Nationality: British
- Born: 25 October 1945 Wandsworth, London, England
- Died: 16 January 2023 (aged 77)
- Height: 176 cm (5 ft 9 in)
- Weight: 68 kg (150 lb)

Sport
- Sport: Middle-distance running
- Event: Steeplechase
- Club: Belgrave Harriers

John Peter Bicourt (25 October 1945 – 16 January 2023) was a British middle-distance runner who competed at the 1972 Summer Olympics and the 1976 Summer Olympics.

== Biography ==
Bicourt competed in the 3000 metres steeplechase and finished second behind Steve Hollings in the 3,000m steeplechase event at the 1972 AAA Championships. Shortly afterwards he represented Great Britain at the 1972 Olympics Games in Munich.

He finished second again behind Hollings at the 1973 AAA Championships before travelling to Christchurch, New Zealand and representing England at the 1974 British Commonwealth Games.

Bicourt would podium again at the AAA Championships but this time third behind Tony Staynings at the 1975 AAA Championships. At the 1976 Olympics Games in Montreal, he represented Great Britain for a second time at the Olympics.

Bicourt died on 16 January 2023, at the age of 77.
