= Mark Pearce (runner) =

British athlete

Personal information
- Nationality: British (English)
- Born: 19 January 1996 (age 30)

Sport
- Sport: Track and Field
- Event: 3000m steeplechase
- Club: Shaftesbury Barnet Harriers Birmingham Running Athletics and Triathlon Club 2025-current

Mark Pearce (born 19 January 1996) is a British long-distance runner. In 2021 he became the British champion in the 3000 metres steeplechase. He was a finalist at the 2024 European Athletics Championships.

== Biography ==
From the age of 11 years-old Pearce attended St Albans School in Hertfordshire.

On 24 September 2017 Pearce competed at the Berlin Marathon running 2:31.49. On 5 September 2020 he was runner up in the 3000 metres steeplechase at the British Championships beating his personal best by 10 seconds. The time put him 39th for the year, worldwide. In September 2020 he was added to the University of Birmingham Talent Hub, a scheme designed to help talented athletes with a pathway to become world-class performers.

On 26 June 2021 Pearce went one better than his result in the previous year by becoming the British steeplechase champion after winning the title at the 2021 British Athletics Championships.

In February 2024, Pearce was the first finisher home for Team England as he finished eighth at the Armagh International Road Race. In May 2024, he ran a personal best 8:20.83 for the 3000m steeplechase, in Brussels. He was selected to represent Britain in the steeplechase at the 2024 European Athletics Championships in Rome in June 2024, where he qualified for the final and placed 13th overall. Pearce won the Oxford Half Marathon in October 2024 in 65:20.

On 2 August 2025, he placed third in the 3000 metres steeplechase at the 2025 UK Athletics Championships in Birmingham, behind Zak Seddon and Phil Norman.

In July 2026, he was selected to represent England at the 2026 Commonwealth Games in Glasgow, placing eighth in the men's 3000 m steeplechase
