= Craig Murch =

English hammer thrower

Personal information
- Nationality: British (English)
- Born: 27 June 1993 (age 32)

Sport
- Sport: Athletics
- Event: Hammer throw
- Club: Birchfield Harriers
- Coached by: Lorraine Shaw

Craig Murch (born 27 June 1993) is an English athlete specialising in the Hammer throw.

He became British champion when winning the hammer throw event at the 2020 British Athletics Championships with a throw of 73.24 metres.

Since winning the British tite in 2020 Murch has podiumed four times at the British Championships from 2021 to 2025.
