= Wolverhampton & Bilston Athletics Club =

Athletics club

Wolverhampton & Bilston AC (WBAC)
- Founded: 1924
- Ground: Aldersley Stadium
- Location: Aldersley Road, Wolverhampton WV6 9NW, England
- Coordinates: 52°36′17″N 2°09′01″W
- Website: official website

Wolverhampton & Bilston Athletics Club was formed in 1967 and has its home ground at Aldersley Leisure Village, formally Aldersley Stadium in Aldersley, Wolverhampton, England.

== History ==
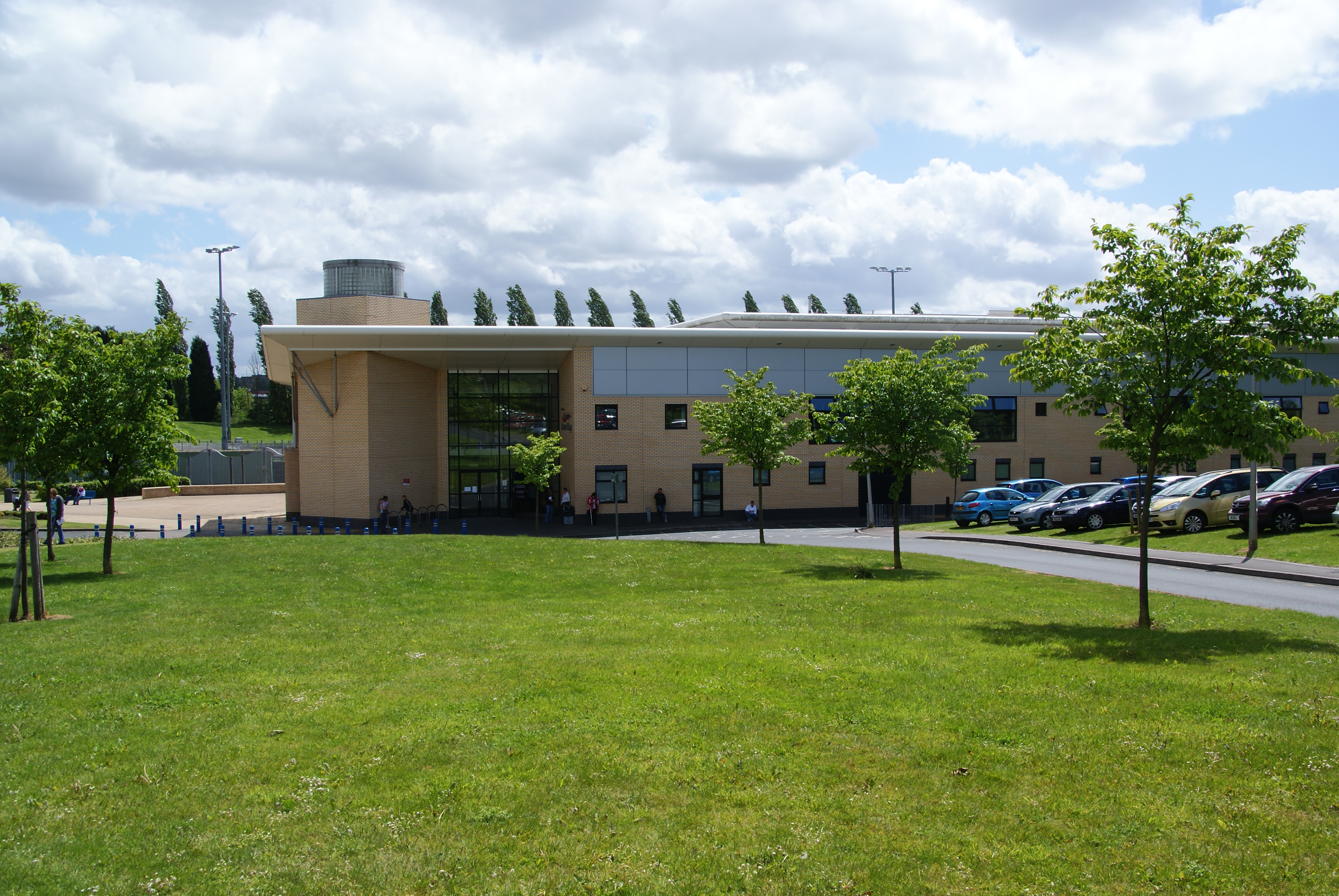
Aldersley Leisure Village Sports centre in 2011

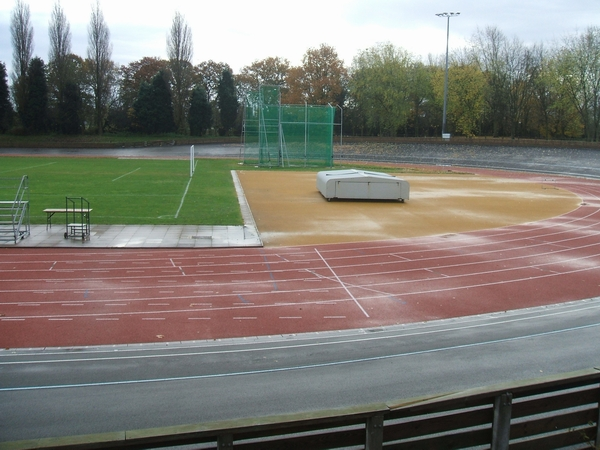
The track in 2006

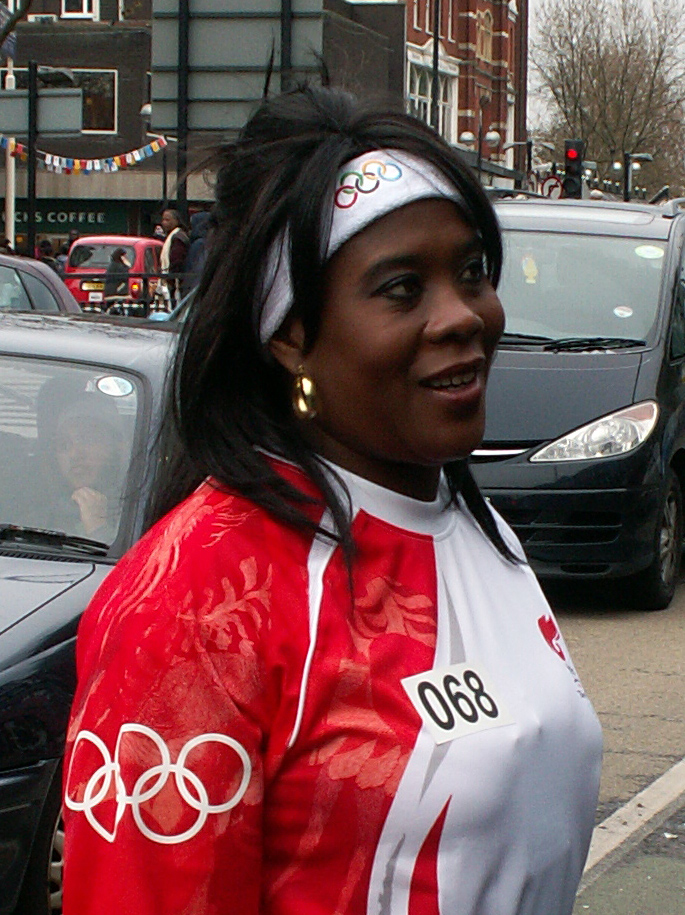
Tessa Sanderson

In 1924 the Harriers Athletic Club which would formally be called the Wolverhampton Athletics Club was founded. In 1943 the club merged with Penn Harriers to form the Wolverhampton Harriers.

In February 1967 after a local government reorganisation the two local athletic clubs, Wolverhampton Harriers and Bilston Town Athletic Club merged to form the Wolverhampton and Bilston Athletic Club.

The club won the Men's National League Division One from 1975 to 1982 and the Men's National Cup 1976, 1977, 1979 and 1980.

== Honours ==
Senior Men:

- British Athletics League
  - First Place: 1975, 1976, 1977, 1978, 1979, 1980, 1981, 1982
  - Second Place: 1974, 1984, 1985
  - Third Place: 1972, 1973, 1986, 1987

== Notable athletes ==
=== Olympians ===
Athlete	Events	Games	Medals/Ref
Ralph Banthorpe	200 metres, 4 × 100 m relay	1968	
Maureen Tranter	200 metres	1968	
Don Halliday	100 m, 4 × 100 m	1972	
Sonia Lannaman	100 metres, 200 m, 4 × 100 m relay	1972, 1980	Bronze medal
Rosemary Stirling	800 metres	1972	
Verona Elder-Barnard	400 metres, 4 × 400 m relay	1972, 1976	
Denise Brown	high jump	1976	
Glen Cohen	400 m, 4 × 400 m relay	1976, 1980	
Tessa Sanderson	javelin throw	1976, 1980, 1984, 1988, 1992, 1996	Gold medal
Keith Connor	triple jump	1980, 1984	
Kathy Smallwood-Cook	100 m, 200 m, 400 m, 4 × 100 m relay	1980, 1984	Bronze medal Bronze medal Bronze medal
Joan Baptiste	200 m	1984	
Phil Beattie	400 m hurdles	1984	
Garry Cook	4 × 400 m relay	1984	Silver medal
Martin Girvan	hammer throw	1984	
Pat Beckford	400 m	1988	
John King	long jump	1988	
Paul Mardle	discus	1988	
Joanne Mulliner	heptathlon	1988	
Vernon Samuels	triple jump	1988	
Steve Heard	800 m	1992	
Lisa Langford-Kehler	10/20km walk	1992, 2000	
Denise Lewis	heptathlon	1996, 2000, 2004	Gold medal Bronze medal

=== Other ===
- Mike Bull, gold medal winner at the Commonwealth Games
