= Michael Ohioze =

British athlete

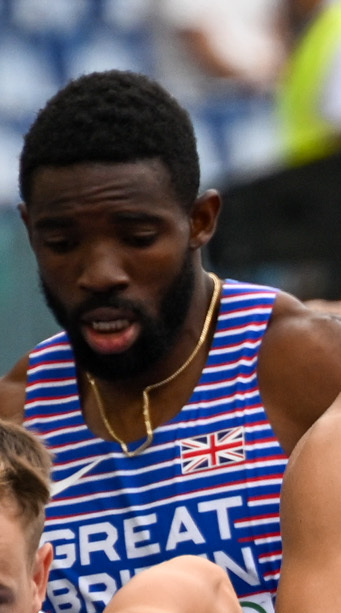
- Michael Ohioze in 2024

Personal information
- Nationality: British
- Born: 6 February 1995 (age 31)

Sport
- Sport: Track and Field
- Event: 400m
- Club: Shaftesbury Barnet Harriers

Michael Ohioze (born 6 February 1995) is a British athlete who competes in the sprints, predominantly the 400 metres.

== Biography ==
Ohioze studied at St. Ambrose University in Iowa after earning a scholarship, initially for soccer, graduating in May 2017 with a Bachelor of Arts degree in Physical Education on along with additional majors in sports management and philosophy. Ohioze was a 10 time All-American for his results in track and field. Ohioze then joined the Graduate Kinesiology program at Saint Mary's College of California.

On 26 June 2021 Ohioze came third at the 2021 British Athletics Championships 400 metres race. Three days later he was named in the sprinter pool for the 4 x 400 metres relay at the delayed 2020 Summer Games.

In May 2024, he was selected to represent Britain in the 4x400m relay at the 2024 European Athletics Championships in Rome. He was part of the men's 4x400m relay team which won their heat to qualify for the final. He finished third in the 200m at the 2024 British Athletics Championships in Manchester on 30 June 2024.

Ohioze was also an assistant coach for the women's soccer team at Merritt College.
