= Eric Hall (athlete) =

British racewalker (1932–2022)

Personal information
- Nationality: British (English)
- Born: 15 September 1932 Oxshott, Surrey, England
- Died: 20 March 2022 (aged 89)
- Height: 183 cm (6 ft 0 in)
- Weight: 64 kg (141 lb)

Sport
- Sport: Athletics
- Event: Racewalking
- Club: Belgrave Harriers

Eric William Hall (15 September 1932 – 20 March 2022) was a British racewalker. He competed at the 1956 Summer Olympics and the 1960 Summer Olympics, and was a member of the Belgrave Harriers.

== Biography ==
Hall was born in Oxshott, Surrey, in 1932. He went to the Tiffin Grammar School in Kingston upon Thames, where he took up cross country running and cricket. He became a racewalker after doing weekend walks from the house his grandmother lived in. In November 1948, at the age of sixteen, he joined the Belgrave Harriers. After leaving school, Hall joined the Customs and Excise Office.

Hall won nine Surrey County Road Walking titles over multiple distances. Stan Vickers also joined the Belgrave Harriers, and he and Hall began to race against each other. In 1955, Hall finished third in the National Road Walking Championships, and a year later, he finished in second place in the National 50km event. That performance was good enough to earn Hall selection on the British Olympic team.

Hall competed at two Olympic Games. At the 1956 Olympics in Melbourne, Hall competed in the men's 50 kilometres walk, where he finished in ninth place. Four years later, at the 1960 Olympics in Rome, he competed in the men's 20 kilometres walk, finishing in tenth place. He also entered the trials for the 1964 Summer Olympics in Tokyo, but was not selected after finishing in fifth place.

He became the president of the Belgrave Harriers in 1999, and later became the treasurer of the British Olympians Society. Hall died in March 2022, at the age of 89. At the time of his death, Hall was the oldest member of the Belgrave Harriers.
