= Edinburgh Athletic Club =

British athletics club

- Founded: 1885/2007
- Ground: Meadowbank Sports Centre
- Location: London Road, Edinburgh EH7 6AE, Scotland
- Coordinates: 55°57′25″N 3°09′31″W
- Website: official website

Edinburgh Athletic Club is a British athletics club based in Edinburgh, Scotland. The club is based primarily at the Meadowbank Sports Centre on London Road and train on Tuesday, Wednesday and Thursday evenings. Although founded in 2007 the club has a rich history under multiple other names.

== History ==
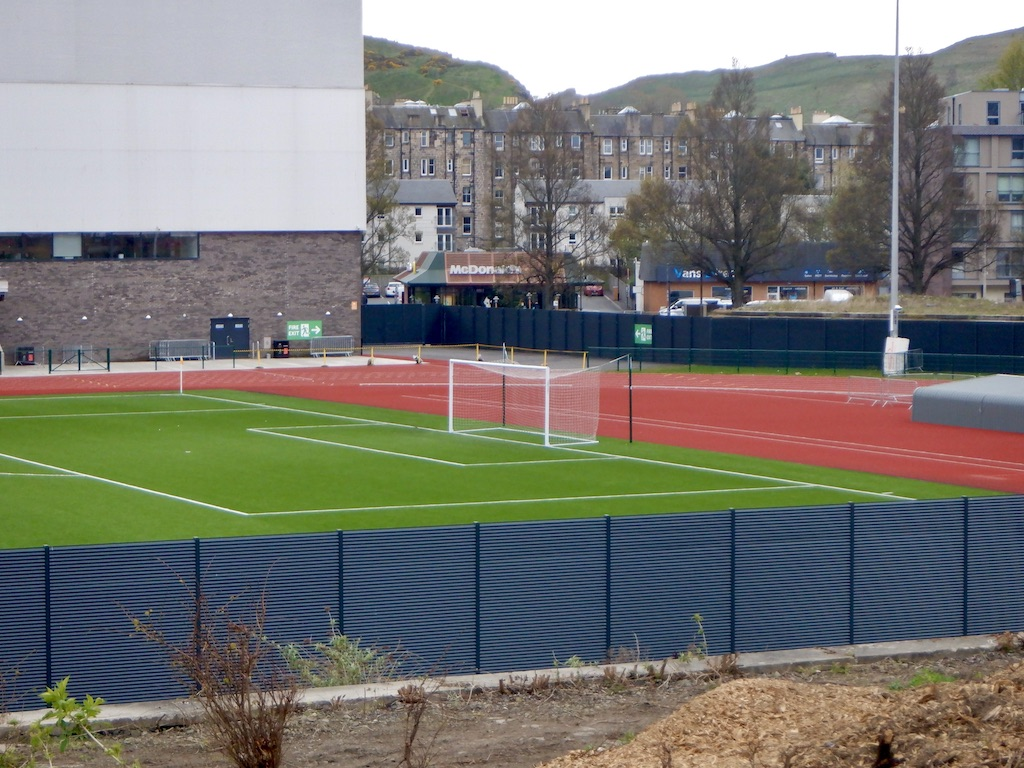
The track and pitch in 2023

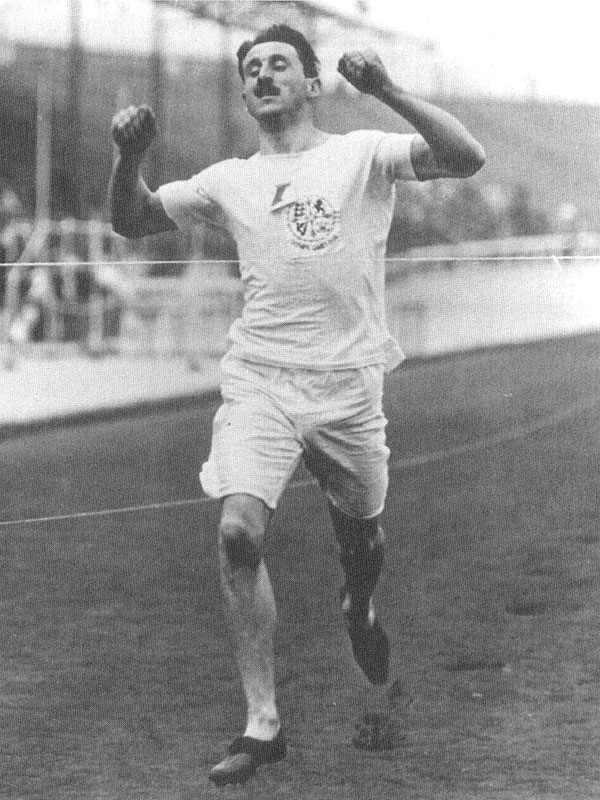
Wyndham Halswelle wins Olympic gold in 1908

The origins of the club date back to 1885 and the formation of Edinburgh Harriers who were based in the Western part of the city. They were followed by the creation of three other clubs so that the whole city could be catered for. The Edinburgh Northern Harriers arrived in 1889 and the Edinburgh Southern Harriers in 1897. Finally in 1922 the Cannon Athletic Club (later Edinburgh Eastern Harriers) were formed.

The club's first Olympic gold medalist was Wyndham Halswelle in the 400 metres event at the 1908 Summer Olympics in London.

In 1961 the Edinburgh Harriers (who by now had a ladies section), Northern Harriers and Eastern Harriers all merged to become the first named Edinburgh Athletic Club but the Southern Harriers continued independently.

In 1968, Southern Harriers became the first Scottish club to participate in the inaugural British Athletics League and experienced some success, finishing third in 1975 and runner-up in 1976, while the women's Southern Harriers won the inaugural UK Women's Athletic League in 1975.

Later the Southern Harriers would race temporarily under the names Caledon Park Harriers (men) and Edinburgh Woollen Mill (women) for sponsorship purposes.

In 1996, the City of Edinburgh Athletic Club was formed when Edinburgh Athletic Club and Edinburgh Southern Harriers (men) merged to finally unify all of the men's clubs in the city. In 2006, the Southern Harriers (women) won the UK athletics league for the second time.

The final amalgamation came during 2007, when the men's club City of Edinburgh Athletics Club and Edinburgh Southern Harriers (women) became the club as it is today, a single city club for both men and women.

The first major success under the new name came with the women's section of the club after they won the UK women's athletic league in both 2013 and 2014.

== Honours ==
- British Athletics League, runner-up; 1976
- UK Women's Athletic League; champions 1975, 2006, 2013, 2014

== Notable athletes ==
=== Olympians ===
Athlete	Club	Events	Games	Medals/Ref
James Cormack	Edinburgh Harriers	marathon	1906	
Wyndham Halswelle	Edinburgh Harriers	200m, 400m, 800m	1906, 1908	Gold medal Silver medal Bronze medal
Reginald MacPherson	Edinburgh Harriers	non starter	1906	
Tom Jack	ESH	marathon	1908	
George Wallach	ESH	10,000m	1912	
(Canada) Jimmy Duffy	ESH	marathon	1912	
Fergus Murray	ESH	10,000m	1964	
Dave Stevenson	ESH	pole vault	1964	
Jim Alder	1st Edinburgh AC	Marathon	1968	
Gareth Bryan-Jones	ESH	Steeplechase	1968	
Don Macgregor	ESH	marathon	1972	
Dave Wilson	1st Edinburgh AC	110m hurdles	1972	
Chris Black	ESH	hammer throw	1976, 1980	
Helen Golden	ESH	200m	1976	
Moira Walls	ESH	high jump	1976	
Drew McMaster	1st Edinburgh AC	100m, 4x100m	1980	
Meg Ritchie	ESH	discus throw	1980, 1984	
Allan Wells	ESH	100m, 200m, 4x100m	1980, 1984	Gold medal Silver medal
Peter Hoffmann	1st Edinburgh AC	non starter	1976	
Elliot Bunney	ESH	4x100m	1988	Silver medal
Tom Hanlon	Caledon Park	steeplechase	1992	
Yvonne Murray	1st Edinburgh AC	3000m	1988, 1992	Bronze medal
Allison Curbishley	Woollen Mills	400m, 4x400m	1996, 2000	
Karen MacLeod	1st Edinburgh AC	marathon	1996	
Sinead Dudgeon	Woollen Mills	400m hurdles	2000	
Shirley Webb	City of Edinburgh AC	Hammer	2004	
Freya Murray-Ross	Edinburgh AC	Marathon	2012	
Lynsey Sharp	Edinburgh AC	800m	2012, 2016	
Chris O'Hare	Edinburgh AC	1500m	2016	
Beth Dobbin	Edinburgh AC	200m & 4x100m	2021	
Josh Kerr	Edinburgh AC	1500m	2021, 2024	Silver medal Bronze medal
Jake Wightman	Edinburgh AC	1500m	2021	

- Scottish unless stated

=== Commonwealth Games ===
Athlete	Club	Events	Games	Medals/Ref
Hayley Ovens	Woollen Mills	1500m	2002, 2006	
(Wales) Paul Walker	Edinburgh AC	pole vault	2010, 2014	

=== Other ===
- Allister Hutton (1990 London Marathon winner)
