= Sale Harriers Manchester =

British athletics club

- Founded: 1910
- Ground: Crossford Bridge
- Location: Danefield Road, Sale M33 7BG, England
- Coordinates: 53°25′59″N 2°18′45″W
- Website: official website

Sale Harriers Manchester is a British athletics club based in Sale, Greater Manchester, England. The club is based primarily at Crossford Bridge on Danefield Road but also trains at Wythenshawe Park and SportCity in the Manchester Regional Arena.

== History ==
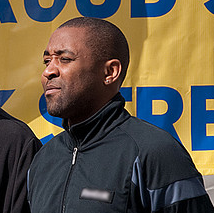
Darren Campbell

The origins of the club began when a Sale Harriers club was formed during 1891.

The club were refounded in 1910 during a joint meeting at the Temperance Rooms in Cross Street and gained affiliation with the East Lancashire Association on 30 September 1911. In 1923 the club used the Moss Lane ground of Altrincham F.C. for their first track events and in the early 1950s, the Sale Borough Council made a rental agreement for land at Crossford Bridge.

The first Olympian connected to the club was Steve Hollings who raced in the 3,000 metres steeplechase at the 1972 Summer Olympics in Munich.

From 1977 to 1987 the women's section of the club won the English National Cross Country Championships seven times and with one of the club's athletes Kathryn Binns winning the individual title in 1979.

From 2002 until 2016, the club went by the name City of Manchester Athletic Club after forming a partnership with Manchester City Council and won the British Athletics League three times during that period in 2007, 2011 and 2014, while the women's section won the UK Women's Athletic League four times from 2007 to 2010.

In 2004 Darren Campbell won a gold medal at the Olympic Games in Athens as part of the 4 x 100 metres British team.

Club stalwart and former coach Morris Jefferson died in March 2025.

== Honours ==
- British Athletics League winners; 1996, 2007, 2011, 2014
- UK Women's Athletic League, winners; 1976, 1977, 1978, 1983, 1984, 1986, 1989, 1990, 1991, 1992, 1994, 1995, 1996, 2000, 2001, 2002, 2003, 2004, 2005, 2007, 2008, 2009, 2010
- English National Cross Country Championships winners; 1977, 1978, 1981, 1982, 1983, 1986, 1987, 2001, 2018

== Notable athletes ==
=== Olympians ===
Athlete	Events	Games	Medals/Ref
Steve Hollings	3,000m steeplechase	1972	
Michelle Probert-Scutt	400m, 4 × 400 m	1980, 1984	Bronze medal
Andy Ashurst	pole vault	1988	
Sue Crehan	marathon	1988	
Diane Edwards-Modahl	800m	1988, 1992, 1996, 2000	
Stephi Douglas	100m	1992—1996	
Paula Fryer	800m	1992	
Kevin McKay	1500m	1992, 1996	
Ann Williams	1500m	1992	
Darren Campbell	100m, 200m, 4 × 100 m	1996, 2000 2004	Gold medal Silver medal
Owusu Dako	200m, 4 × 100 m	1996	
Tony Borsumato	400m hurdles	2000	
Allyn Condon	4 × 100 m, bobsleigh	2000, 2010	
Keri Maddox	400m hurdles	2000	
Lorraine Shaw	hammer throw	2000, 2004	
Philippa Roles	discus throw	2004, 2008	
Kate Dennison	pole vault	2008, 2012	
Alexander Nelson	200m	2008	
Alex Smith	hammer throw	2012	
Stuart Stokes	3,000m steeplechase	2012	
Chris Baker	high jump	2016	
Kelly Massey	4 × 400 m	2016	Bronze medal
Sonia Samuels	marathon	2016	
Jona Efoloko	4 × 100 m	2020	
Abigail Irozuru	long jump	2020	
Aimee Pratt	3,000m steeplechase	2020	
