= James Cormack =

British athlete

Personal information
- Nationality: British (Scottish)
- Born: 28 January 1877 Ayr, Scotland
- Died: 22 January 1965 (aged 87) Kingswood, Surrey, England

Sport
- Sport: Athletics
- Event: Long-distance/Marathon
- Club: London Athletic Club; Edinburgh Harriers; Pretoria Harriers; Transvaal Athletic Association

James Noble Cormack RIBA (28 January 1877 – 22 January 1965) was a Scottish architect and track and field athlete who competed at the 1906 Olympic Games.

== Biography ==
James Cormack was born in Ayr, a small town near Edinburgh, Scotland. No definitive information is available about his family. He was educated at Ayr Academy and the Edinburgh Institution for Languages and Mathematics. In 1902, he took the position of draughtsman at the Public Works Department of Cradock, South Africa. Later that year, he transferred to the Public Works Department of the Transvaal in Pretoria and, in 1910, became Inspector of Works. He was a member of the South African Institute of Architects and received his RIBA membership in 1911. In 1912, he became the Transvaal Public Works Department’s Assistant Engineer.

With the outbreak of World War I, Cormack enlisted in the Cape Town Highlanders and was commissioned with the rank of Major. It is not known if he fought in the regiment’s African campaign, or its battles in France, but he may have been injured, as the Public Works Department listed him as being ‘On Leave’ in 1919. In 1924, he went to work for the Imperial War Graves Commission, which named him Deputy Director of Works in East Africa, and then he became the commission’s Director of Works in South West Africa.

Cormack retired in 1931 and with his wife Mary, whom he had married in 1924, moved to Tanganyika, where they bought a 400-acre farm which Cormack named 'Ailsa', after the Scottish island Ailsa Craig. The property had been a German pig farm which was surrendered to the British after the Armistice; the Cormacks turned it into a self-sustaining hotel and their sons, Keith and David, became professional hunting guides. In 1962, the Cormacks sold Aisla to missionaries and moved to England, where Cormack died in 1965.

=== Athletic Career ===
Cormack was a distance runner and a member of the Edinburgh Harriers and the London Athletic Club. In the Amateur Athletic Association of England’s AAA Championships in Scotland in 1901, he ran the 880-yard race and placed fourth. In 1902, he won the 440-yard race. Also in 1902, in the AAA Scotland vs Ireland event in Dublin, he finished second in the 880-yard race.

In South Africa, he was a member of the Transvaal Athletic Association and captain of the Pretoria Harriers; he won the club’s cross-country championship in 1904. That year, he won the 25-mile South African cross-country championship and, in 1906, ran for Britain at the Olympics in Athens, where he placed 14th (3-35:00) and became the first British subject to finish an Olympic marathon.
