= Windsor, Slough, Eton and Hounslow Athletic Club =

British athletics club

Windsor, Slough, Eton and Hounslow AC
- Founded: 1904
- Ground: Thames Valley Athletic Centre
- Location: Pococks Lane Eton, Windsor SL4 6HN, England
- Coordinates: 51°29′42″N 0°35′50″W
- Website: official website

Windsor, Slough, Eton and Hounslow Athletic Club is an athletics club based in Eton, Berkshire, England. It is based at the Thames Valley Athletics Centre in Eton. The club competes in the British Athletics League Division 1, UK Women's Athletic League Premier as well as the Southern Athletics League and the London Metropolitan League.

== History ==
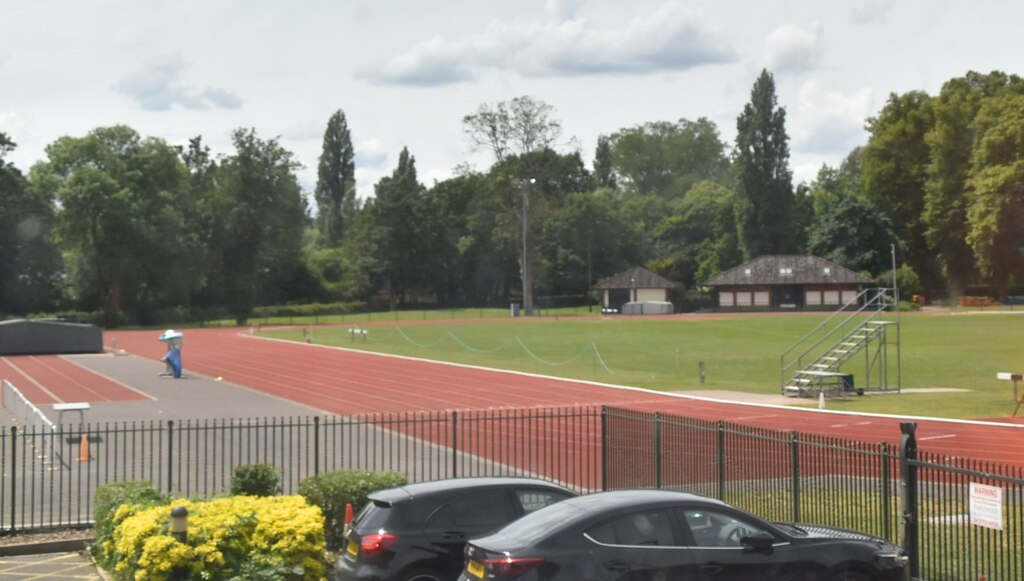
Thames Valley Athletic Centre in 2019

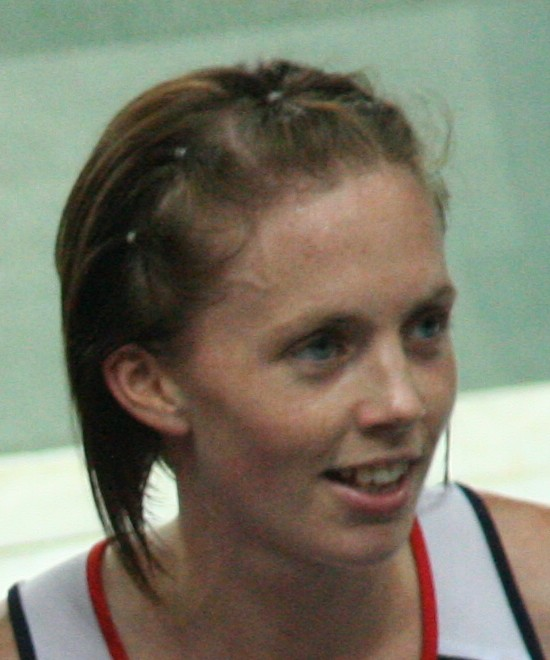
Nicolas Sanders in 2007

In 1904, the Slough Wheelers' Cycling Club changed their name to the Slough Wheelers' Cycling and Athletic Club (also referred to as the Slough Wheelers' Cycling and Harriers Club), a move designed to encapsulate the emerging porpularity of athletics. Later that year the name became permanent following the Annual General meeting of the club held at the Dolphin Hotel. The branch of athletics was called the Slough Harriers, although at this time they remained affiliated to Slough Wheelers.

After World War I in 1919, the Slough Athletic Club was formed after the amalgamation of Slough Wheelers, Slough Harriers and another club called the Chalvey Harriers.

In 1948 a breakaway group formed Eton Athletic Club, who moved to Windsor and became the Windsor & Eton Athletic Club in 1953. However, twenty years later in 1968 the two clubs merged to become Windsor Slough & Eton AC, this was largely due to league athletics coming into existence.

Windsor Slough & Eton AC moved to their present base in 1999 and the following year merged with Borough of Hounslow AC to finally become the name used today, that of Windsor Slough Eton & Hounslow Athletic Club.

== Honours ==
- UK Women's Athletic League (first place: 1998; second place: 1997, 2001, 2002, 2012, 2013; third place: 1999, 2000, 2004, 2009, 2010, 2011)

== Notable athletes ==
=== Olympians ===
Athlete	Club	Events	Games	Medals/Ref
Jeff Gutteridge	Windsor, Slough & Eton AC	pole vault	1976, 1984	
Keith Connor	Windsor, Slough & Eton AC	triple jump	1980, 1984	Bronze medal
Shirley Thomas	Borough of Hounslow AC	100 metres	1984	
Bev Kinch	Borough of Hounslow AC	4 × 100 m relay	1988	
Simone Laidlow	Borough of Hounslow AC	400 m hurdles	1988	
Mark Richardson	Windsor, Slough & Eton AC	4 × 400 m relay	1992, 1996	
Mark Hylton	Windsor, Slough & Eton AC	4 × 400 m relay	1996	
Marcia Richardson	Windsor, Slough & Eton AC	100 m, 4 × 100 m relay	1996, 2000	
Georgina Oladapo	Borough of Hounslow AC	4 × 100 m relay	1996	
Michelle Griffith	Windsor, Slough & Eton AC	triple jump	1996	
Kathy Butler	WSE & H AC	5000 m, 10,000 m	1996, 2004	
James McIlroy	WSE & H AC	800 metres	2000	
Nicola Sanders	WSE & H AC	400 metres	2008	Bronze medal
Lawrence Clarke	WSE & H AC	110 metres hurdles	2012	
Nigel Levine	WSE & H AC	400 metres, 4 × 400 m relay	2012	
Shelayna Oskan-Clarke	WSE & H AC	800 metres	2016	
Andrew Matthews	WSE & H AC	Bobsleigh	2014, 2018	
Morgan Lake	WSE & H AC	High jump	2016	
Taylor Campbell	WSE & H AC	hammer throw	2020	
Jessie Knight	WSE & H AC	400 m hurdles	2020	

=== Other ===
- Lyn Sprules (1998 Commonwealth Games)
- Kelly Morgan (2002 Commonwealth Games}
- Hayley Yelling (2002 & 2006 Commonwealth Games)

== Kit ==
The club kit is a light blue vest or crop top with two horizontal yellow stripes around the middle of the torso.
