= Gareth Bryan-Jones =

British middle-distance runner

Personal information
- Nationality: British (English)
- Born: 25 February 1943 (age 83) West Kirby, England
- Height: 182 cm (6 ft 0 in)
- Weight: 68 kg (150 lb)

Sport
- Sport: Athletics
- Event: Middle-distance running/Steeplechase
- Club: Edinburgh Southern Harriers

David Gareth Bryan-Jones (born 25 February 1943) is a British middle-distance runner who competed at the 1968 Summer Olympics.

== Biography ==
Bryan-Jones ran for Edinburgh Southern Harriers and became the British steeplechase champion after winning the British AAA Championships title at the 1968 AAA Championships.

Later that year at the 1968 Olympic Games in Mexico City, he represented Great Britain in the men's 3000 metres steeplechase.
