= Andrew Morgan-Harrison =

English sprinter

Personal information
- Born: 9 March 1998 (age 27)
- Height: 183 cm (6 ft 0 in)
- Weight: 82 kg (181 lb)

Sport
- Sport: Athletics
- Event: 200 metres
- Club: Kingston upon Hull
- Coached by: Alex O'Gorman

Andrew Morgan-Harrison (born 9 March 1998) is an English athlete specialising in the 200 metres.

He became British champion when winning the 200 metres event at the 2020 British Athletics Championships in a time of 20.69.
