= British Athletics League =

Men-only track and field team competition in the United Kingdom

- Sport: Athletics
- Founded: 1969
- Folded: 2019
- Country: United Kingdom
- Most titles: Belgrave Harriers (11)

The British Athletics League was a men-only track and field team competition in the United Kingdom. The women's competition was known as the UK Women's Athletic League. The events were the pinnacle of the British athletic clubs league system. The competition ended after the 2019 edition, with it being replaced by the National Athletics League for the 2020 season, which was a merger of the men's and women's leagues.

== History ==
Launched in 1969, the British Athletics League was split into different divisions, which gathered a total of 38 track and field teams from all over the United Kingdom.

Since 2009, there were five different divisions (Premiership, National 1, National 2, National 3 and National 4). Each of them has eight teams in competition, except the Division 4, with only six teams. Every summer season, two teams were relegated and two teams were promoted for every division. The last change in the number of divisions took place in 2009, with the creation of the National 4 division.

In every division there was a total of four matches per season. Teams received points according to their athletic performances, and those points were transformed in a range of 1 to 8 points for every match, according with the matches' final table. These points were added after the four matches to determine relegations, promotions and champions.

== Past winners ==
This table lists the top placed clubs from the top division:

Year	First	Second	Third
1969	Birchfield Harriers	Cardiff	Thames Valley Harriers
1970	Thames Valley Harriers	Birchfield Harriers	Cardiff
1971	Thames Valley Harriers	Birchfield Harriers	Cardiff
1972	Cardiff	Thames Valley Harriers	Wolverhampton & Bilston
1973	Cardiff	Thames Valley Harriers	Wolverhampton & Bilston
1974	Cardiff	Wolverhampton & Bilston	Thames Valley Harriers
1975	Wolverhampton & Bilston	Thames Valley Harriers	Edinburgh Southern Harriers
1976	Wolverhampton & Bilston	Edinburgh Southern Harriers	Thames Valley Harriers
1977	Wolverhampton & Bilston	Stretford AC	Cardiff
1978	Wolverhampton & Bilston	Cardiff	Stretford AC
1979	Wolverhampton & Bilston	Essex Beagles	Thames Valley Harriers
1980	Wolverhampton & Bilston	Shaftesbury Barnet Harriers	Essex Beagles
1981	Wolverhampton & Bilston	Haringey	Essex Beagles
1982	Wolverhampton & Bilston	Haringey	Birchfield Harriers
1983	Birchfield Harriers	Haringey	Shaftesbury Barnet Harriers
1984	Haringey	Wolverhampton & Bilston	Birchfield Harriers
1985	Birchfield Harriers	Wolverhampton & Bilston	Haringey
1986	Haringey	Birchfield Harriers	Wolverhampton & Bilston
1987	Birchfield Harriers	Haringey	Wolverhampton & Bilston
1988	Haringey	Birchfield Harriers	Belgrave Harriers
1989	Birchfield Harriers	Haringey	Shaftesbury Barnet Harriers
1990	Haringey	Birchfield Harriers	Belgrave Harriers
1991	Haringey	Belgrave Harriers	Thames Valley Harriers
1992	Belgrave Harriers	Haringey	Birchfield Harriers
1993	Haringey	Belgrave Harriers	Birchfield Harriers
1994	Thames Valley Harriers	Belgrave Harriers	Birchfield Harriers
1995	Belgrave Harriers	Thames Valley Harriers	Haringey
1996	Sale Harriers Manchester	Belgrave Harriers	Thames Valley Harriers
1997	Belgrave Harriers	Puma Thames Valley Harriers	Sale Harriers Manchester
1998	Belgrave Harriers	Newham & Essex Beagles	Sale Harriers Manchester
1999	Belgrave Harriers	Shaftesbury Barnet Harriers	Sale Harriers Manchester
2000	Belgrave Harriers	Newham & Essex Beagles	Sale Harriers Manchester
2001	Belgrave Harriers	Birchfield Harriers	Woodford Green with Essex Ladies
2002	Belgrave Harriers	Woodford Green with Essex Ladies	Birchfield Harriers
2003	Belgrave Harriers	Newham & Essex Beagles	Woodford Green with Essex Ladies
2004	Belgrave Harriers	Woodford Green with Essex Ladies	Birchfield Harriers
2005	Woodford Green with Essex Ladies	Belgrave Harriers	Birchfield Harriers
2006	Belgrave Harriers	Woodford Green with Essex Ladies	City of Manchester AC
2007	City of Manchester AC	Birchfield Harriers	Woodford Green with Essex Ladies
2008	Newham and Essex Beagles	Woodford Green with Essex Ladies	City of Manchester AC
2009	Newham and Essex Beagles	Woodford Green with Essex Ladies	Birchfield Harriers
2010	Newham and Essex Beagles	Birchfield Harriers	Woodford Green with Essex Ladies
2011	City of Manchester AC	Woodford Green with Essex Ladies	Birchfield Harriers
2012	Shaftesbury Barnet Harriers	Newham and Essex Beagles	Woodford Green with Essex Ladies
2013	Shaftesbury Barnet Harriers	City of Manchester AC	City of Sheffield AC
2014	City of Manchester AC	Shaftesbury Barnet Harriers	City of Sheffield AC
2015	Birchfield Harriers	City of Sheffield AC	Shaftesbury Barnet Harriers
2016	Birchfield Harriers	Shaftesbury Barnet Harriers	Woodford Green with Essex Ladies
2017	Birchfield Harriers	Newham and Essex Beagles	Woodford Green with Essex Ladies
2018	Birchfield Harriers	Shaftesbury Barnet Harriers	Woodford Green with Essex Ladies
2019	Birchfield Harriers	Newham and Essex Beagles	Shaftesbury Barnet Harriers

== Teams in 2019 ==
=== Premiership ===
Country	Club	First Appearance in BAL
(England)	Birchfield Harriers	1969
(England)	Blackheath and Bromley Harriers Athletic Club	1969
(Wales)	Cardiff AAC	1969
(England)	City of Sheffield and Dearne Athletic Club	1977
(England)	Harrow	1986
(England)	Newham and Essex Beagles	1975
(England)	Shaftesbury Barnet Harriers	1976
(England)	Woodford Green with Essex Ladies	1969

=== National Division One ===
Country	Club	First Appearance in BAL
(England)	Bournemouth Athletic Club	1992
(England)	City of Liverpool AC	1970
(England)	Sale Harriers Manchester	1969
(England)	Southampton Athletic Club	1969
(Wales)	Swansea Harriers AC	1971
(England)	Thames Valley Harriers	1969
(England)	Windsor, Slough, Eton & Hounslow AC	1979

=== National Division Two ===
Country	Club	First Appearance in BAL
(England)	Bristol & West Athletic Club	1969
(England)	Chelmsford AC	2015
(England)	Crawley Athletic Club	1985
(Scotland)	Glasgow City	2009
(England)	Havering Mayesbrook AC	1991
(England)	Herne Hill Harriers	1983
(England)	Kingston Athletic Club and Polytechnic Harriers	1969
(England)	Notts Athletic Club	1969

=== National Division Three ===
Country	Club	First Appearance in BAL
(England)	Basingstoke and Mid Hants	2006
(England)	Bedford & County AC	1979
(England)	City of Portsmouth AC	2015
(England)	Nene Valley Harriers	2010
(England)	Rugby & Northampton AC	unknown
(England)	Tonbridge AC	unknown
(England)	Trafford Athletic Club	1974
(England)	Yeovil Olympiads Athletics Club	2009

=== National Division Four ===
Country	Club	First Appearance in BAL
(England)	Croydon Harriers	unknown
(England)	Enfield & Haringey AC	1972
(England)	Herts Phoenix AC	unknown
(England)	Doncaster AC	Unknown
(England)	Reading AC	1971
(England)	Newquay and Par AC	2014
(England)	Southend Athletic Club	2005
