= Ranjit Bhatia =

Indian long-distance runner

Ranjit Bhatia (27 May 1936 – 9 February 2014) was an Indian athlete and journalist who ran in the marathon and 5000 meters events at the 1960 Summer Olympics in Rome.

== Early life and education ==
Ranjit Bhatia was born on 27 May 1936. He studied at the Lawrence School, Sanawar. He then attended Oxford University as a Rhodes scholar, matriculating from Jesus College in 1957.

Bhatia was an active athlete, both at Oxford (awarded a Blue) as well as a member of the Belgrave Harriers. He participated in the 1960 Rome Olympics, coming 60th in the marathon and participating in heats of the 5000 metres race.

== Career ==
Following his graduation from Oxford, Ranjit Bhatia returned to India. In 1960, he joined St. Stephen's College, Delhi to teach mathematics. He remained there until his retirement as Reader.

He was a sports writer and presenter. He wrote for Athletics Weekly and covered several Olympic Games for Indian newspapers, including The Statesman.

Bhatia was an active member of the Association of Track and Field Statisticians. He was also a national-level selector for Indian athletics between 1976 and 1984.

Among his written works are the Handbook of Indian Athletics, and the Book of Asian Games.

Ranjit Bhatia was an administrator for the Indian chapter of the Rhodes Scholarships from 1962 till his retirement in 1997.

== Awards ==
For his services to the Rhodes Trust and athletics, Bhatia was awarded the OBE.

== Death ==
Following a long battle with Parkinson's disease, Bhatia died on 9 February 2014 in Delhi.
