= Swansea Harriers Athletics Club =

British athletics club

- Founded: 1962
- Ground: Swansea University Sports Centre
- Location: Sketty Lane, Sketty, Swansea SA2 8QB, Wales
- Coordinates: 51°36′25″N 3°59′16″W
- Website: official website

Swansea Harriers Athletics Club is an athletics club based at the International Sports Village in Swansea, Wales. The facility is owned by Swansea University.

The club currently has about 600 members and participates in Track & Field, Cross Country, Road Running, Race Walking and Fell Running. Training takes place on most evenings, with the main Club nights being Tuesday and Thursday. The Club use the outdoor athletics track and also utilises the adjoining indoor athletics facility. Endurance athletes utilise Swansea Bay with sessions taking place at Swansea Beach, Singleton Park, Clyne Valley, Swansea promenade as well as longer weekend runs to the Gower.

== History ==
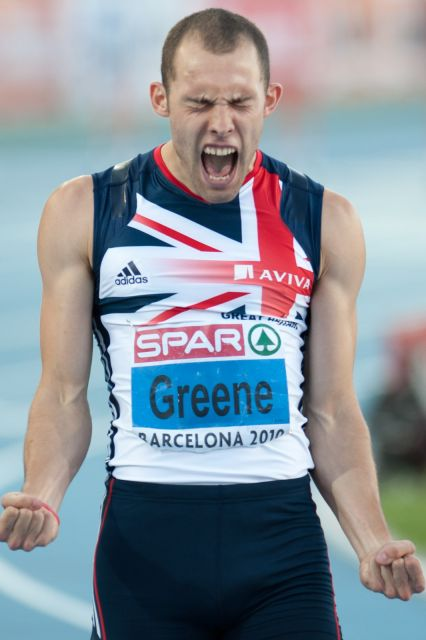
Dai Greene in 2010

Although athletics has taken place in Swansea since at least the late 19th century it was not until the formation of Cockett Boy's Club in 1955 that the origins of the current club were born. In 1961 Cockett AC became affiliated to Welsh A.A.A. and the following year change their name to Swansea Harriers. Since then the club has produced Great Britain and Welsh international athletes in age groups from junior to senior and won Welsh and British titles at Club level.

In 1981 the club represented Wales in the European Cup for Champion Cross Country Clubs, following their 1980 success when they became Welsh champions.

The Harriers were voted "UK Athletics Club of the Year in 2009" and in 2012 celebrated its 50th anniversary during the London Olympic Year.

== Competitions ==
In track and field the Club competes in the British Athletics League and the UK Women's Athletic League and the Welsh Senior League. Junior athletes compete in the Welsh Junior League, the National Young Athletes League and the National Junior League as well as regional and national championships.

In Cross Country all age groups take part in the Gwent Cross Country League and regional and national championships while senior athletes also take part in the West Glamorgan Cross Country League.

In Road Running the Club takes part in the National 12 Stage (Men) and 6 Stage (Women) Road Relays in Sutton Park, Birmingham as well as the 6/4 Stage Relays in October. Athletes take part in road races across the UK, as well as national and regional championships and the London Marathon. The club also enters a masters team in the annual Welsh Castles Road Relay held annually in June.

== Notable members ==
=== Olympians ===
Athlete	Events	Games	Medals/Ref
Ian Hamer	5,000m	1992	
Hayley Tullett	1500m	2000, 2004	
Philippa Roles	discus throw	2004, 2008	
Dai Greene	400m hurdles, 4 × 400 m	2012	
Joe Brier	4 × 400 m	2020	

=== Commonwealth Games ===
Athlete	Events	Games	Medals/Ref
Hannah Brier	100m, 4 × 100 m	2014, 2022	
Rachel Johncock	100m, 4 × 100 m	2014	
Josh Griffiths	marathon	2018	
