= Trafford Athletic Club =

British athletics club

- Founded: 1964
- Ground: Trafford Athletic Stadium
- Location: Longford Park, Ryebank Road, Stretford, Manchester M21 9TA, England
- Coordinates: 53°26′47″N 2°17′22″W
- Website: official website

Trafford Athletic Club is a British athletics club based in Stretford, Greater Manchester, England. The club is based primarily at Trafford Athletic Stadium, also known as the Longford Park Stadium on Ryebank Road.

== History ==
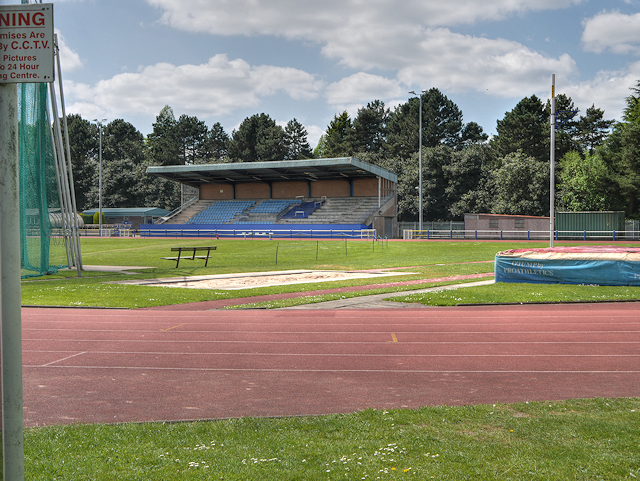
Longford Park Stadium in 2016

In April 1961, Stretford Council approved plans to build a new athletics stadium in Longford Park but the construction did not start until three years later in 1964.

In September 1964, the opening of the new stadium at Longford Park took place but the Mayor of Stretford, Councillor William Fearnhead, then called for a club to be set up there. A club duly followed with Ken Owen and Roger Colson sharing the club secretary role and Bill Murphy being the fixture secretary.

In October 1965 the club officially set up their winter headquarters at Longford Park and in February 1966, Streftord AC amalgamated with Cheadle and Gatley AC. Cheadle and Gatley had been based at Scholes Park in Gatley and had produced athletes the calibre of Derek Ibbotson and Peter Warden. Additionally the Cheadle stick man logo was retained by Stretford AC.

The club's first star was Jannette Champion (later Roscoe) who represented England at the 1970 British Commonwealth Games in Edinburgh. The club excelled at the 1971 AAA Championships with Sharon Colyear and Jannette Champion both winning titles.

The club's first Olympian was Andy Carter in the 800 metres, although Jannette Champion was also selected but did not start. In 1975 Christine Tranter won the English National Cross Country Championships for the club.

The club was renamed in circa.1992 to Trafford Athletic Club, although the press continued to refer to Stretford for some time afterwards. In 1998 the club received a national lottery award of £750,000 to improve facilities.

== Honours ==
- British Athletics League, runner-up; 1977
- UK Women's Athletic League; champions 1979, 1981, 1985
- English National Cross Country Championships winners; (indiv) 1975,

== Notable athletes ==
=== Olympians ===
Athlete	Events	Games	Medals/Ref
Andy Carter	800m	1972	
Jannette Roscoe	4 × 400 m (ns)	1972, 1976	
Sharon Colyear-Danville	100m, 100m h, 4 × 100 m	1976, 1984	
Janet Marlow	1500m	1980	
Shirley Strong	100m hurdles	1980, 1984	Silver medal
Paula Dunn	100m, 200m, 4 × 100 m	1988	
Lesley-Ann Skeete	100m hurdles	1988, 1992	
Sandra Douglas	40m, 4 × 400 m	1992	Bronze medal
Louise Fraser	400m hurdles	1992	
Phylis Smith	400m, 4 × 400 m	1992, 1996	Bronze medal
Diane Allahgreen	100m hurdles	2000	
Chris Rawlinson	400m hurdles	2000, 2004	
Janine Whitlock	pole vault	2000	
Andrew Steele	400m, 4 × 400 m	2008	Bronze medal
Seren Bundy-Davies	400m	2016	

=== Other ===
- Geoff Hignett (1970 Commonwealth Games)
- Christine Tranter (1978 Commonwealth Games silver medal)
- Liz Fairs (1998 Commonwealth Games)
- Susan Jones (2002 Commonwealth Games silver medal)
