= Steve Hollings =

British athlete

Personal information
- Nationality: British (English)
- Born: 23 November 1946 (age 79) Wakefield, England
- Height: 167 cm (5 ft 6 in)
- Weight: 50 kg (110 lb)

Sport
- Sport: Athletics
- Event: Middle-distance / Steeplechase
- Club: Sale Harriers

Stephen Charles Hollings (born 23 November 1946) is a male British retired middle-distance runner. He competed at the 1972 Summer Olympics.

== Biography ==
Hollings finished third behind Andy Holden in the 3,000 metres teeplechase event at the 1971 AAA Championships before becoming the British 3000 metres steeplechase champion after winning the British AAA Championships title at the 1972 AAA Championships

Shortly afterwards at the 1972 Olympics Games in Munich, he represented Great Britain in the men's 3000 metres steeplechase. He retained his AAA title at the 1973 AAA Championships.

He represented England in the 3,000 metres steeplechase event, at the 1974 British Commonwealth Games in Christchurch, New Zealand. Later, Hollings moved to New Zealand and won the national 3000 metres steeplechase title in 1977.

Hollings currently works as a statistician for Athletics New Zealand.
