= Belgrave Harriers =

British athletics club

- Type: Athletic club
- Founded: October 1887; 137 years ago
- Ground: Battersea Park
- Location: Wimbledon & Wandsworth
- Activities: Road running Cross country running Track and field Racewalking
- Website: www.belgraveharriers.com

Belgrave Harriers is an athletics club in London, England, with headquarters located in Wimbledon, close to Wimbledon Common. Belgrave Harriers compete in track and field, road running, racewalking and cross country events, and have traditionally drawn their members from South London and Surrey, but in recent decades have athletes from all over the United Kingdom and overseas.

== History ==
The club was founded in 1887. In the early days, the clubs's administrative headquarters were at the Kings Arms public house in Belgravia, central London, and races were held along the Embankment of the River Thames and also over the common lands south of London, particularly on Wimbledon Common. These days, Belgrave's home track is located at the Millennium Arena, Battersea Park and club members, known as 'Belgravians', train there on Tuesday and Thursday evenings.

Belgrave Harriers' most successful period lasted from the 1920s to the 1950s, but the 21st century saw a resurgence, and they have won 29 national championships in this period on the road, in cross-country and on the track. The success included winning the National Cross Country Championship in 1935, 1939, 1946, 1948.

In 1982, the Surrey Athletic Club disbanded and the male athletes from the club joined Belgrave Harriers, while the women decided to join Royal Borough of Kingston Athletic Club instead.

In 2013, Belgrave Harriers announced their withdrawal from the British Athletics League due to a shortage of necessary volunteer officials. As of February 2013, they had the most successful record in the history of the British Athletics League, with 11 titles.

However, the club continues to gain success and won the 2024 National women's cross country relay title.

== Honours ==
=== Men ===
- European Champion Clubs Relays: 4x100m, 4x200m, 4x400m and 4x800m 1999
- British Athletics League Premier Division: 1992, 1995, 1997, 1998, 1999, 2000, 2001, 2002, 2003, 2004, 2006
- British Athletics League Gold Cup: 1991, 1992, 1996, 1997, 1998, 1999
- British Athletics League Golden Jubilee Cup: 2002, 2003
- National Cross Country Championship: 1935, 1939, 1946, 1948, 2004.
- National Cross Country Relay Championship: 2003, 2007
- AAA National 6-Stage Road Relay: 2001, 2002, 2003, 2004, 2005, 2007, 2008
- AAA National 12-Stage Road Relay (London to Brighton 1924-1965): 1934, 1935, 1936, 1947, 1948, 1949, 1951, 2002, 2003, 2005, 2009
- AAA 5 km: 2006
- AAA 10 km: 2003
- AAA Half-Marathon: 2002, 2004, 2007
- AAA Marathon: 1996
- RWA 20 miles: 1924, 1925, 1928, 1929, 1938, 1939, 1952, 1954, 1955, 1957, 1960, 1970
- RWA 50 km: 1934, 1935, 1936, 1938, 1951, 1954, 1956, 1957, 1958, 1960, 1961, 1964, 1966, 1967, 1968, 1969, 1970
- RWA 20 km: 1968, 1969, 1973, 1979
- RWA 10 miles: 1947, 1948, 1957, 1958, 1959, 1960, 1963, 1970, 1971, 1972, 1974, 1982, 1984

=== Women ===
- British Athletics League Golden Jubilee Cup: 2002, 2003
- AAA 10 km: 2006
- AAA Marathon: 2004

== Notable athletes ==
=== Olympians ===
Athlete	Events	Olympics	Medals
Tommy Green	50km walk	1932	Gold medal
James Ginty	3,000m steeplechase	1936	
Harry Churcher	10km walk	1948	
Bill Lucas	5,000m	1948	
Étienne Gailly	marathon	1948	Bronze medal
Eric Hall	20km walk, 50km walk	1956, 1960	
Stan Vickers	20km walk	1956, 1960	
Ranjit Bhatia	5,000m, marathon	1960	
Ray Middleton	50km walk	1964	
Derek Boosey	triple jump	1968	
John Bicourt	3000m steeplechase	1972, 1976	
Paul Edwards	shot put	1988, 1992	
John Regis	100m, 200m relay	1988, 1992, 1996	
Jon Ridgeon	110m hurdles, 400m hurdles	1988, 1996	
Max Robertson	400m hurdles	1988, 1992	
Gary Staines	5,000m	1988	
Marcus Adam	100m, 200m, relay	1992	
Nigel Bevan	javelin throw	1992	
Mike Edwards	pole vault	1992	
Paul Evans	10,000m	1992, 1996	
Du'aine Ladejo	400m, relay	1992, 1996	
Brendan Reilly	high jump	1992, 2000	
Nick Sweeney	discus throw	1992, 1996, 2000	
Justin Chaston	3,000m steeplechase	1996, 2000, 2004	
Andy Tulloch	110m hurdles	1996	
Sean Baldock	400m, relay	2000, 2004	
Ben Challenger	high jump	2000	
Matt Douglas	400m hurdles	2000, 2004	
Andy Graffin	1,500m	2000	
Paskar Owor	800m	2000, 2004	
Dwain Chambers	100m, relay	2000, 2012	
Phillips Idowu	triple jump	2000, 2004, 2008, 2012	Silver medal
Tim Benjamin	400m, relay	2004	
Sarah Claxton	100m hurdles	2004, 2008	
Chris Lambert	200m	2004	
Shelley Newman	discus throw	2004	
Goldie Sayers	javelin throw	2004, 2008, 2012	Bronze medal
Darvin Edwards	high jump	2012	
Georgia Bell	1500 metres	2024	Bronze medal
