= Enfield and Haringey Athletic Club =

British athletics club

- Founded: 1999
- Ground: New River Stadium / Lee Valley Athletics Centre / QEII Stadium, Enfield
- Location: London, England
- Coordinates: 51°36′19″N 0°06′01″W
- Website: official website

Enfield and Haringey Athletic Club is an athletics club based in North London, England. The club are based at three venues; New River Stadium, Lee Valley Athletics Centre and the Queen Elizabeth II Stadium (Enfield).

== History ==
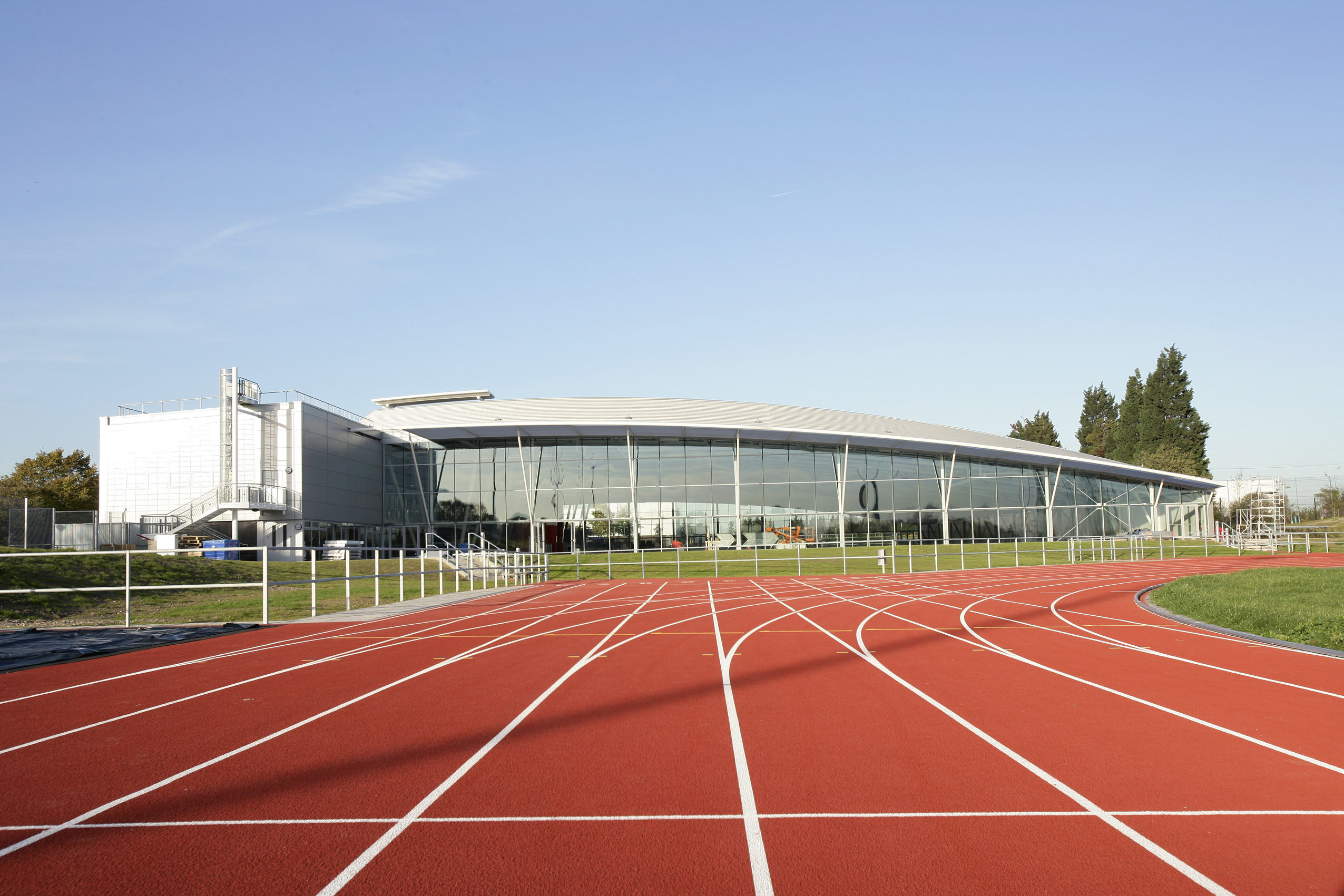
Lee Valley Athletics Centre in 2009

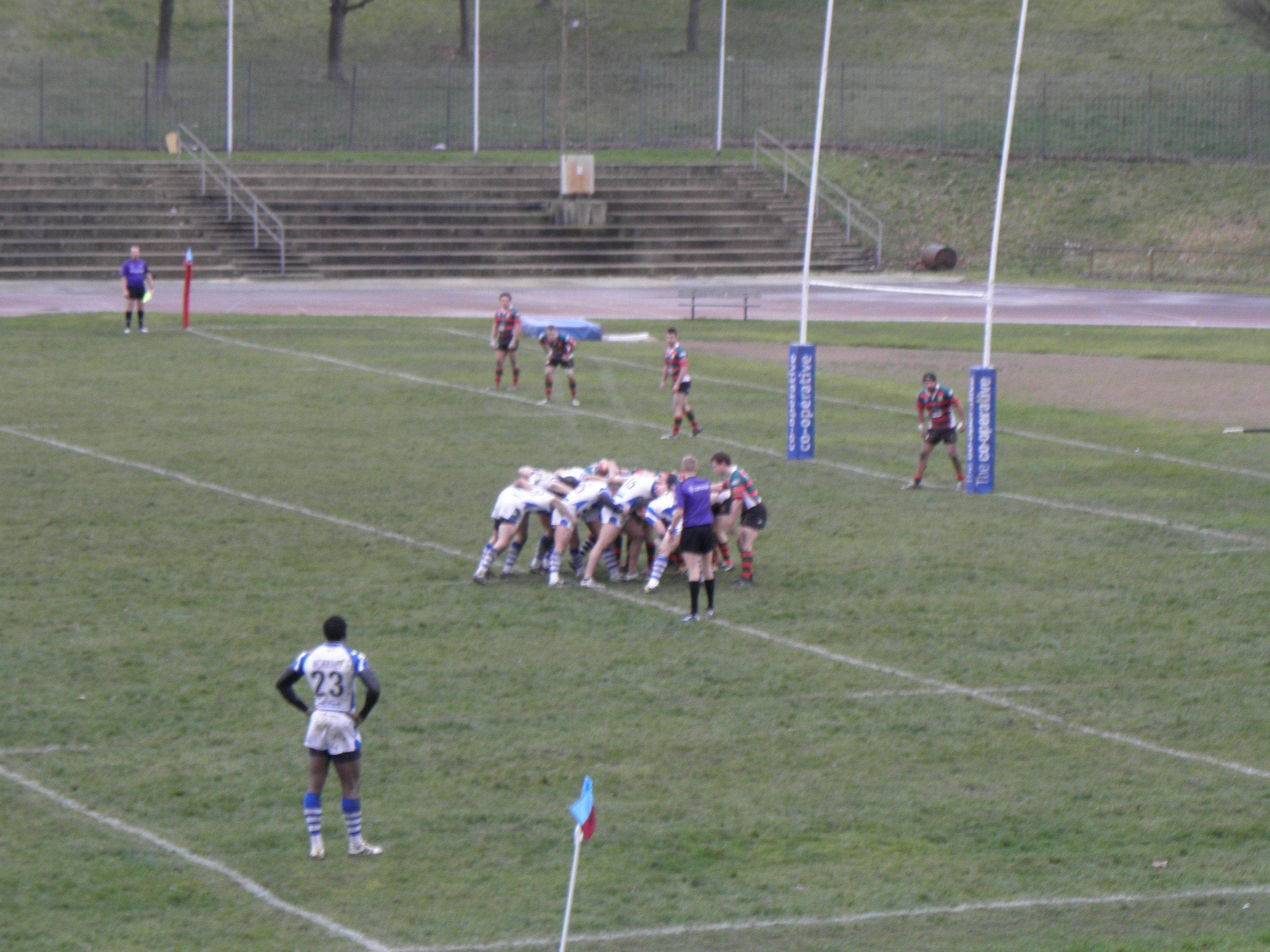
New River Stadium in 2010

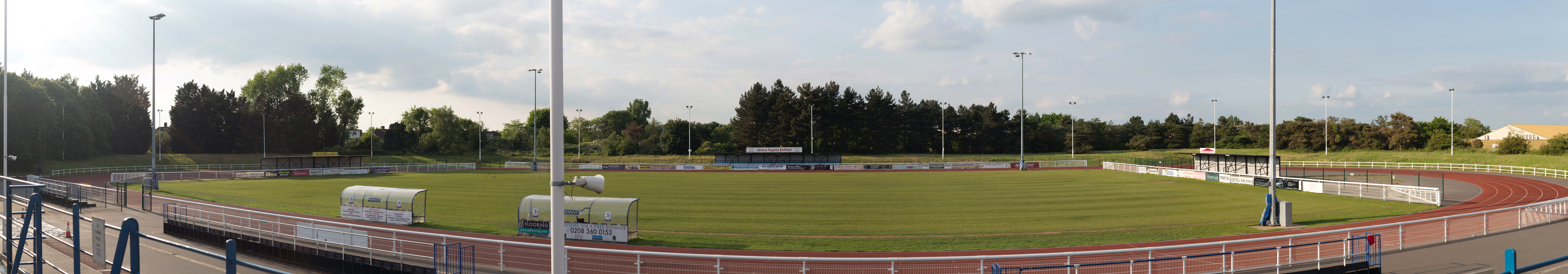
The QEII Stadium in 2017

The origins of the club began with the creation of three clubs. The Enfield Athletic Club was founded 1920 and the Ponders End Athletic Club was founded in 1922. Another club, known as Southgate Harriers, was formed in 1932 by a breakaway group from the Southgate and Wood Green Sports Association.

In 1965 the Enfield AC and Ponders End AC merged to become the Borough of Enfield Harriers in 1965 and nine years later in 1974, Southgate AC moved from Broomfield Park to White Hart Lane Community Sports Centre and became known as the Haringey & Southgate AC, which was later shortened to Haringey AC.

In 1999 the Borough of Enfield Harriers and Haringey AC merged to become the name that it used today, that of Enfield and Haringey AC.

In September 2006, Enfield and Haringey Athletic Club won the National Young Athletes League Final. In doing so, stopping the three year stranglehold on the title by Blackheath and Bromley Harriers.

== Honours ==
Senior Men:

- British Athletics League
  - First place: 1984, 1986, 1988, 1990, 1991, 1993
  - Second place: 1981, 1982, 1983, 1987, 1989, 1992
  - Third place: 1985, 1995
- European Champion Clubs Cup
  - Second place: 1992
  - Third place: 1985, 2008
- National U17 Champions for 8 successive years
- National U20 Champions for 9 successive years
- European U20 Champions in 2003 and finalists for past 7 years.

== Notable athletes ==
Enfield and Haringey AC, and while under its former names, has produced a considerable number of successful athletes.

=== Olympians ===
Athlete	Club	Events	Olympics	Medals/ref
Paul Vallé	Enfield AC	200 meters	1948	
John Giles	Southgate Harriers	shot put	1948, 1952	
Stan Cox	Southgate Harriers	10000 meters & marathon	1948, 1952	
Peter Higgins	Southgate Harriers	400 m, 4 × 400 m	1956	Bronze medal
John Wrighton	Southgate Harriers	400 meters	1960	
Gerry McIntyre	Ponders End AC	marathon	1960	
Ron Jones	Enfield Harriers	100 m, 4 × 100 m relay	1964, 1968	
Alan Lerwill	Enfield Harriers	long jump	1968, 1972	
Geoff Capes	Enfield Harriers	shot put	1972, 1976, 1980	
Roy Mitchell	Enfield Harriers	long jump	1976	
Paul Dickenson	Enfield Harriers	hammer throw	1976, 1980	
Gary Oakes	Haringey AC	400-meter hurdles	1980	Bronze medal
Heather Oakes	Haringey AC	4 × 100 meter relay	1980, 1984	Bronze medal Bronze medal
Sebastian Coe	Haringey AC	800 meters & 1500 meters	1980, 1984	Gold medal Gold medal Silver medal Silver medal
Mike McFarlane	Haringey AC	100 m, 200 m, 4 × 100 relay	1980, 1984, 1988	Silver medal
Wilbert Greaves	Haringey AC	110 m hurdles	1980, 1984	
Keith Stock	Haringey AC	pole vault	1984	
Roald Bradstock	Enfield Harriers	javelin throw	1984, 1988	
John Herbert	Haringey AC	triple jump	1984, 1988	
Matthew Mileham	Haringey AC	hammer throw	1984, 1988	
Sue Morley	Enfield Harriers	400 m hurdles	1984	
Brian Whittle	Haringey AC	400 meters	1988	
Clarence Callender	Haringey AC	4 × 100 m relay	1988	
Tony Jarrett	Haringey AC	110 meters hurdles	1988, 1992, 2000	
Steve Crabb	Enfield Harriers	1500 meters	1988, 1992	
Dalton Grant	Haringey AC	high jump	1988, 1992, 1996	
Max Robertson	Haringey AC	400 m hurdles	1988, 1992	
Wendy Jeal	Haringey AC	100 m hurdles	1988	
Simon Williams	Enfield Harriers	discus throw	1992	
Hughie Teape	Enfield Harriers	110 m hurdles	1992	
Shaun Pickering	Haringey AC	shot put	1996	
Darren Braithwaite	Haringey AC	100 m, 4 × 100 m	1996	
David Strang	Haringey AC	800 m	1996	

=== Other ===
- Bernard Eeles: 1934 British Empire Games
- William Land; 1934 British Empire Games
- Graham Eggleton: 1982 Commonwealth Games
- Michelle Campbell Edwards: 1991 World Championships
- Solomon Wariso: 1998 Commonwealth Games
- Leon Baptiste: 2010 Commonwealth Games
