= Cardiff Amateur Athletic Club =

Wales-based athletics club

Cardiff Athletics
- Cardiff Amateur Athletic Club
- Logo of Cardiff Athletics

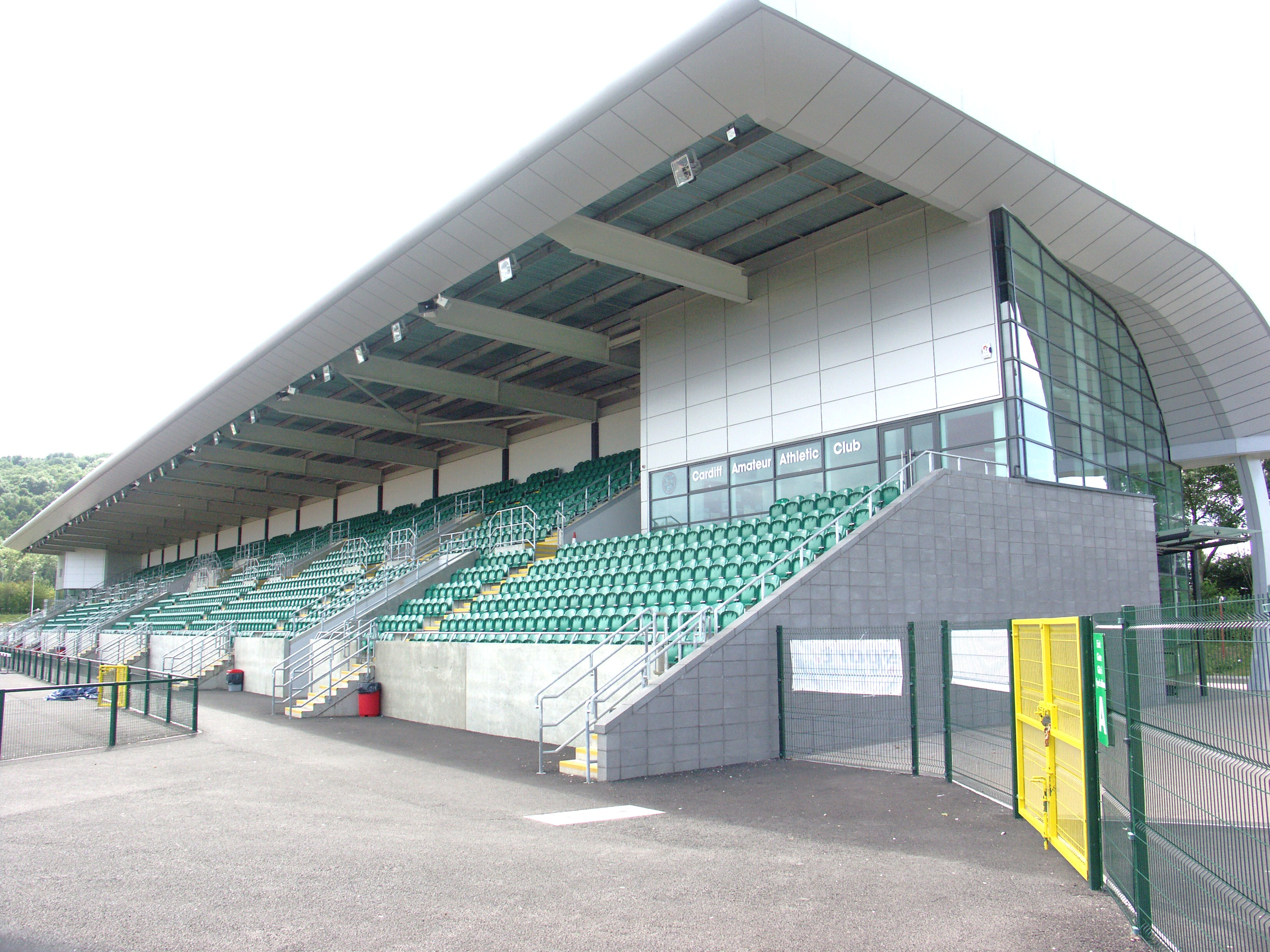
- Cardiff International Sports Stadium, home of Cardiff Amateur Athletic Club
- Established: 1882 as Roath (Cardiff) Harriers
- Merger of: Roath Harriers and Birchgrove Harriers in 1968
- Headquarters: Cardiff International Sports Stadium
- Coordinates: 51.47327°N 3.21086°W
- President: Nigel Walker
- Website: www.cardiffathletics.org
- Formerly called: Roath (Cardiff) Harriers

Cardiff Amateur Athletic Club (Cardiff AAC) (Welsh: Clwb Athletau Amatur Caerdydd), is an athletics club in Cardiff, Wales. The club competes at the Cardiff International Sports Stadium and comprises five sections, each specialising in a separate sport: track and field, road running, cross country, mountain running, and road walking. Cardiff AAC athletes have won a total of 122 medals at major international championships—Olympic and Paralympic Games, World and European Championships, Commonwealth Games and the World University Games.

== History ==
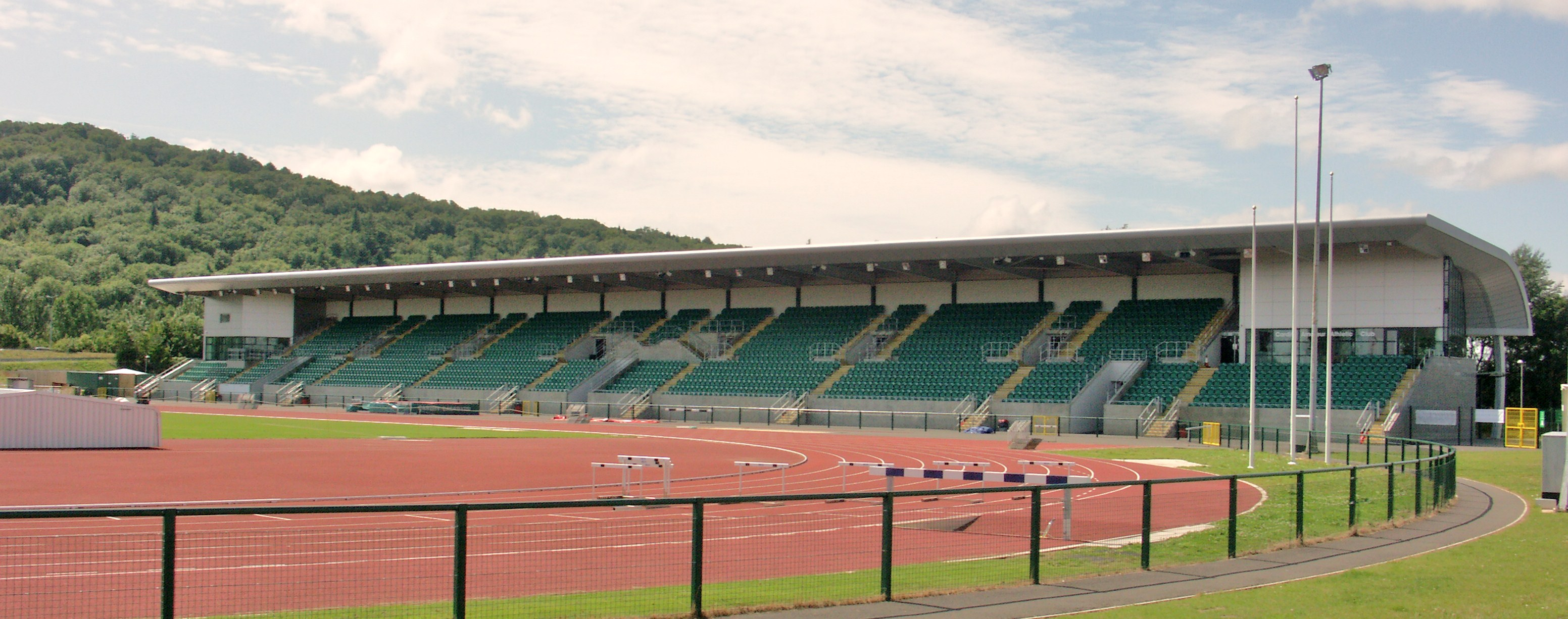
A view of the track in 2009

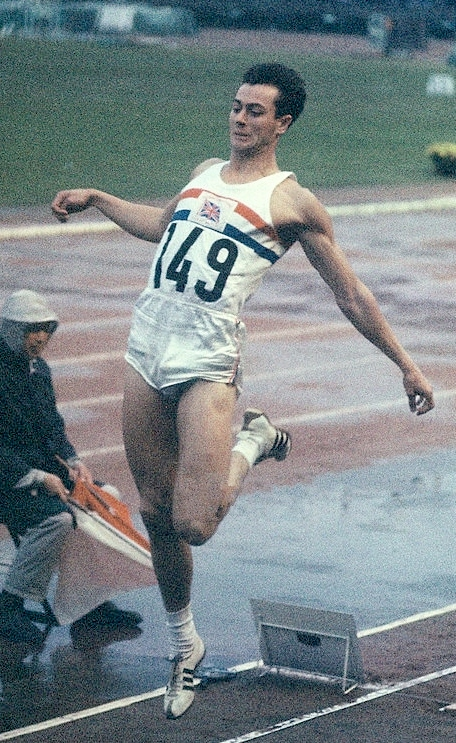
Lynn Davies

Formed in 1882 as Roath (Cardiff) Harriers, the club began as a cross country club, the first athletics only club in Wales. Roath Harriers runners became individual and team champions of the first South Wales Cross Country Championships, held on 7 March 1894.

Roath Harriers shared Maindy Stadium with Birchgrove Harriers from its opening in 1951 and the two clubs amalgamated to form Cardiff Amateur Athletic Club in 1968.

Lynn Davies, who was a member of Roath Harriers, was the club's first Olympian at the 1964 Olympic Games in Tokyo. Competing in the men's long jump event he won the first ever long jump gold medal for Great Britain.

Cardiff were British Athletics League champions in 1972, 1973, and 1974.

== Honours ==
- British Athletics League winners; 1972, 1973, 1974

== Notable athletes ==
=== Olympians ===
Athlete	Events	Games	Medals/Ref
Lynn Davies	long jump, 100m, 4x100m	1964, 1968, 1972	Gold medal
Berwyn Price	4x 100m, 110m hurdles	1972, 1976	
Venissa Head	shot put/discus	1984	
Nigel Walker	100m hurdles	1984	
Colin Jackson	110m hurdles	1988, 1992, 1996, 2000	Silver medal
Helen Miles	100m, 4x100m	1988	
Angela Tooby	10,000m	1988	
Susan Tooby	marathon	1988	
Kay Morley	100m hurdles	1992	
Jamie Baulch	400m, 4x400m	1996, 2000	Silver medal
Andres Jones	10,000m	2000	
Christian Malcolm	200m	2000, 2004, 2008, 2012	
Christian Stephenson	3,000m steeplechase	2000	
Matt Elias	4x400m	2004	
(Botswana) Gable Garenamotse	long jump	2004, 2008	
Gareth Warburton	800m	2012	
Rhys Williams	400m hurdles	2012	
Jake Heyward	1500m	2020	
Jeremiah Azu	4x100m relay	2024	

=== Commonwealth Games ===
Athlete	Events	Games	Medals/Ref
Jim Alford	1 mile event	1938	Gold medal
Clive Longe	decathlon	1966	Silver medal
Steve Barry	30 km walk	1982	Gold medal
Sian Morris	200m, 4x100m	1986	Bronze medal
Carmen Smart	200m, 4 x100m	1986	Bronze medal
Paul Gray	110m hurdles, 4x400m	1994, 1998, 2002	Bronze medal Bronze medal
Douglas Turner	200m, 4x100m	1998, 2002	
Tim Benjamin	400m, 4x400m	2002	Silver medal
Joe Thomas	800m	2010, 2014	
Bethan Davies	20km walk	2018	Bronze medal
David Omoregie	100m hurdles	2018	

=== Other ===
- Tanni Grey-Thompson (11 x Paralympic Games gold medalist)
- Stephen Herbert (Paralympics Games silver medalist)
- Tracey Hinton (Paralympic Games silver and bronze medalist)

== See also ==
- Sport in Cardiff
