= Birchfield Harriers =

Athletics club in Birmingham, England

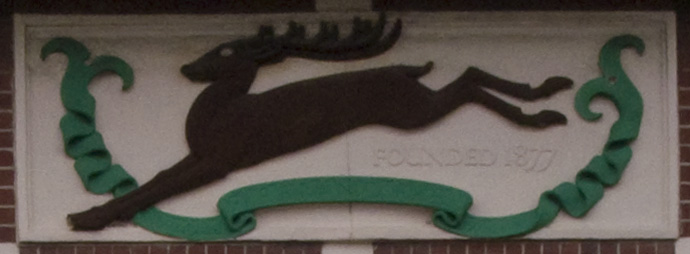
- Birchfield Harriers' badge on Perry Barr Stadium
- Founded: 1877
- Ground: Alexander Stadium
- Location: Walsall Rd, Perry Barr, Birmingham B42 2LR, England
- Coordinates: 52°31′53″N 1°54′19″W
- Website: official website

Birchfield Harriers is an athletics club, founded in 1877. Its home is at Birmingham's Alexander Stadium, England.

As well as allowing recreational runners they cater for all levels of experience up to and including Olympic athletes whether able-bodied or wheelchair-using athletes.

The Club's motto is Fleet and Free.

== History ==
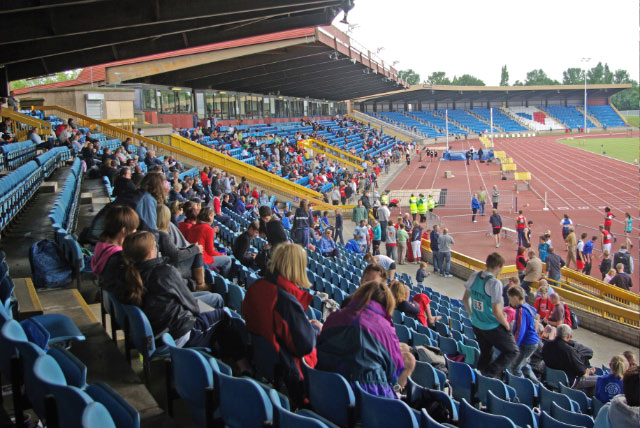
The Alexander Stadium

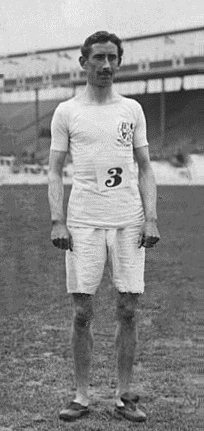
Arthur Robertson, the club's first Olympic gold medal winner

Founded in 1877, the Harriers were named after the Birchfield district of Birmingham. In June 1879, the club held its first annual athletics meeting at the Aston Lower Grounds, attended by 4,000 despite the unfavourable weather. In July 1881, they held their fifth Amateur Bicycle and Athletic Sports event.

In 1908 Archie Robertson was Birchfield's first Olympic gold medallist.

From 1929 to 1977, the Harriers were based at nearby Perry Barr, was Alexander Sports Ground, which, until its demolition in October 2025, still carried their badge, a running stag, rendered in this case in Art Deco style, carved in 1929 and attributed to William Bloye. Both venues were named for members of the Alexander family, who were prominent members of the club.

Pat Cropper was made a Member of the Order of the British Empire (MBE) for her running achievements in the 1974 Birthday Honours. In 1993, Peter Radford served as Chairman of UK Athletics.

In the 2000 New Year Honours, heptathlete Denise Lewis was made an Officer of the Order of the British Empire (OBE). In 2010, coach Norma Blaine was made an MBE in the New Years Honours announced on 31 December 2010, for her services to athletics.

Tom McCook, a former athlete and club chairman, was the club's President from 2001 until standing down at the end of 2013.

== Honours ==
- British Athletics League, champions 1969, 1983, 1985, 1987, 1989, 2015, 2016, 2017, 2018, 2019
- UK Women's Athletic League, champions 2011, 2012, 2016

== Notable athletes ==
=== Olympians ===
| Athlete | Events | Games | Medals/Ref |
|---|---|---|---|
| Daphne Arden | 100m, 200m, 4x100m | 1964 | Bronze medal |
| Meghan Beesley | 400m hurdles | 2020 | |
| Ainsley Bennett | 200m, 4x400m | 1976 | |
| Joe Blewitt | 5000m, 3,000m team, 3000m steeplechase | 1920, 1928 | Silver medal |
| Robbie Brightwell | 400m, 4x100m, 4x400m | 1960, 1964 | Silver medal |
| Audrey Brown | 100m, 4x100m | 1936 | Silver medal |
| Godfrey Brown | 400m, 4x100m, 4x400m | 1936 | Gold medal |
| Phil Brown | 400m, 4x400m | 1984, 1988 | Silver medal |
| Daniel Caines | 400m, 4x400m | 2000, 2004 | |
| Geoff Capes | shot put | 1972, 1976, 1980 | |
| Gladys Clarke | javelin | 1948 | |
| Charles Clibbon | 5000m, 10,000m | 1920, 1924 | |
| John Cooper | 400m hurdles, 4x400m | 1964, 1968 | Silver medal Silver medal |
| Clova Court | heptathlon | 1992 | |
| Dave Cropper | 800m | 1968, 1972 | |
| Sidney Cross | triple jump | 1948 | |
| Jock Dalrymple | javelin | 1924 | |
| Samantha Davies | 200m, 4x100m | 2000 | |
| Zoe Derham | hammer throw | 2008 | |
| Cyril Dugmore | triple jump | 1928 | |
| Cyril Ellis | 1500m | 1924, 1928 | |
| Sally Ellis | marathon | 1992 | |
| Mike Farrell | 800m | 1956 | |
| Stewart Faulkner | long jump | 1988 | |
| Joel Fearon | bobsleigh | 2014, 2018 | Bronze medal |
| Walter Freeman | cross country | 1920 | Silver medal |
| Helen Frost | 4x400m | 2000 | |
| Elliot Giles | 800m | 2016, 2020 | |
| Billy Green | 400m | 1928 | |
| Jack Hambidge | 200m | 1928 | |
| John Hanlon | 400m | 1928 | |
| Lorraine Hanson | 400m | 1992 | |
| Louise Hazel | heptathlon | 2012 | |
| Julie Hollman | heptathlon | 2008 | |
| Harry Houghton | 800m | 1924, 1928 | |
| Matt Hudson-Smith | 400m, 4x400m | 2016 | |
| Fred Hulford | 800m, 1500m | 1912 | |
| David Jenkins | 400m, 4x400m | 1972, 1976, 1980 | Silver medal |
| Pat Jones | 80m hurdles | 1968 | |
| Winnie Jordan | 100m | 1948 | |
| Helen Karagounis | 4x400m | 2004 | |
| Karl Keska | 10,000m | 2000 | |
| Du'aine Ladejo | 400m, 4x400m | 1992, 1996 | |
| Mark Lewis-Francis | 100m, 4x100m | 2004 | Gold medal |
| Denise Lewis | long jump, heptathlon | 1996, 2000, 2004 | Gold medal Bronze medal |
| Fred Light | 5,000m team | 1928 | |
| Judy Livermore-Simpson | pentathlon, heptathlon | 1980, 1984, 1988 | |
| Vincent Loney | 1500m | 1908 | |
| Pat Lowe-Cropper | 800m | 1968, 1972 | |
| Bertram Macdonald | 3000m team | 1924 | Silver medal |
| Ruth Martin-Jones | long jump | 1972 | |
| Germaine Mason | high jump | 2008 | Silver medal |
| Eric McCalla | triple jump | 1984 | |
| Katharine Merry | 200m, 400m, 4x100m, 4x400m | 1996, 2000 | Bronze medal |
| Aston Moore | triple jump | 1976 | |
| Mica Moore | bobsleigh | 2018 | |
| John Morbey | long jump | 1964 | |
| Brett Morse | discus throw | 2012 | |
| (United States) Adam Nelson | shot put | 2000, 2004, 2008 | Gold medal |
| Sidney Newey | 3000m steeplechase | 1924 | |
| Tom Parsons | high jump | 2008 | |
| Howard Payne | hammer throw | 1964, 1968, 1972 | |
| Shara Proctor | long jump | 2012, 2016 | |
| Carole Quinton | 80m hurdles, 4x100m | 1956, 1960 | Silver medal |
| Peter Radford | 100m, 200m, 4x100m | 1960, 1964 | Bronze medal Bronze medal |
| Mike Rawson | 800m | 1956 | |
| Derek Redmond | 400m | 1988, 1992 | |
| (Republic of Ireland) Sarah Reilly | 100m, 200m | 2000 | |
| (Australia) Jean Roberts | discus throw | 1968 | |
| Arthur Robertson | 5 miles, 3 miles team, 3,200m steeplechase | 1908 | Gold medal Silver medal |
| Michael Rosswess | 200m | 1988 | |
| John Salisbury | 400m | 1956 | Bronze medal |
| Sue Scott-Reeve | pentathlon, long jump | 1968, 1976, 1980 | |
| John Sherwood | 400m hurdles, 4x400m | 1964, 1968, 1972 | Bronze medal |
| Donald Slack | pentathlon, decathlon | 1964 | |
| Ray Smedley | 1500m | 1972 | |
| Glen Smith | discus throw | 1996, 2000 | |
| Kelly Sotherton | heptathlon, 4 x 400m | 2004, 2008 | Bronze medal Bronze medal Bronze medal |
| Ian Stewart | 500m | 1972, 1976 | Bronze medal |
| Mary Stewart | 1500m | 1976 | |
| Stuart Storey | 110m hurdles | 1968 | |
| Danny Talbot | 200m, 4 x 100m | 2012, 2016 | |
| Bill Tancred | discus throw | 1968, 1972 | |
| Eddie Webster | 10,000m, cross country | 1924 | |
| Bob Weir | discus throw, hammer throw | 1984, 1996, 2000 | |
| Nick Whitehead | 4 x100m | 1960 | Bronze medal |
| Malcolm Yardley | 400m, 4x400m | 1960 | |

=== Other ===
- Fred Green
- Ashia Hansen
- Diane Leather
- Gladys Lunn
- Doris Nelson Neal OBE
- Beryl Randle
- Scott Rider
- William Snook
- Mark Thomas

== Bibliography ==
- Alexander, William O; Morgan, Wilfred (1988). The History of Birchfield Harriers 1877-1988. Birchfield Harriers. ISBN 0-9514082-0-8.
- Rogers, Gareth; Morgan, Wilfred; McCook, Tom (2005). Fleet and Free — A History of Birchfield Harriers Athletic Club. Tempus. ISBN 0-7524-3523-X.
