= Woodford Green with Essex Ladies =

British athletics club

- Founded: 1908
- Ground: Ashton Athletic Centre
- Location: Woodford, London
- Coordinates: 51°36′26″N 0°03′00″E
- Website: www.wgel.org.uk

Woodford Green with Essex Ladies is one of the leading British athletics clubs. They are based at Ashton Athletic Centre, Woodford, London and share the stadium with Woodford Town F.C..

== History ==
Sally Gunnell

Woodford Green was established in 1908 and admitted to the Amateur Athletic Association in March 1908.

Essex Ladies AC began life as Eastern Ladies AC in 1921, in 1922 became Manor Park Ladies AC and finally Essex Ladies in 1924. Woodford Green AC merged with Essex Ladies AC in 1998.

The club topped Division 1 of the British Athletics League for the first time in 2005.

== Honours ==
- British Athletics League: winners 2005; second place: 2002, 2004, 2006, 2008, 2009, 2011; third place: 2001, 2003, 2007, 2010, 2012
- UK Women's Athletic League, winners 1987, 1988 (as Essex Ladies)

== Olympic athletes ==
Athlete	Club	Events	Games	Medals/Ref
Harry Payne	Woodford Green AC	marathon	1928	
Nellie Carrington	Essex Ladies AC	high jump	1936	
Dorothy Manley	Essex Ladies AC	100 m, 4 × 100 m relay	1948	Silver medal
Joan Shepherd	Essex Ladies AC	long jump	1948	
Geoff Elliott	Woodford Green AC	pole vault, decathlon	1952	
Jean Desforges	Essex Ladies AC	80 m hurdles, 4 × 100 relay	1952	Bronze medal
Pam Seaborne	Essex Ladies AC	80 m hurdles	1952	
Gerry Carr	Woodford Green AC	discus throw	1956	
Derek Johnson	Woodford Green AC	800 m, 4 × 400 m relay	1956	Silver medal Bronze medal
Dave Chapman	Woodford Green AC	3000 m steeplechase	1960	
David Jones	Woodford Green AC	100 m, 200 metres, 4 × 100 m	1960	Bronze medal
(Wales) Ron Jones	Woodford Green AC	100 m, 4 × 100	1964, 1968	
Sue Longden	Essex Ladies AC	pentathlon	1976, 1980	
Gladys Taylor	Essex Ladies AC	400 m, 400 m hurdles, 4 × 400	1976, 1984	
Kim Hagger	Essex Ladies AC	long jump, heptathlon	1984, 1988	
Jenny Stoute	Essex Ladies AC	200 m, 4 × 400	1988, 1992	Bronze medal
(Sierra Leone) Prince Amara	Woodford Green AC	800 m, 4 × 400	1992, 1996	
Sally Gunnell	Essex Ladies AC	100 m hurdles, 400 m h, 4 × 400	1988, 1992, 1996	Gold medal Bronze medal
(Sierra Leone) Josephus Thomas	Woodford Green AC	4 × 100	1996	
Ashia Hansen	Essex Ladies AC / WGEL	triple jump	1996, 2000	
Shelley Holroyd	Essex Ladies AC	javelin	1996	
Joice Maduaka	WGEL	100 m, 200 m, 4 × 100	2000, 2004	
(Nigeria) Uchenna Emedolu	WGEL	100 m, 200 m, 4 × 100	2000, 2004, 2008	Bronze medal
(Nigeria) Musa Audu	WGEL	4 × 400	2004	Bronze medal
Malachi Davis	WGEL	400 m, 4 × 400	2004	
Joanne Fenn	WGEL	800 m	2004	
Emeka Udechuku	WGEL	discus throw	2004	
(Poland) Robert Wolski	WGEL	high jump	2004	
Sarah Claxton	WGEL	100 m h	2004, 2008	
Jeanette Kwakye	WGEL	100 m, 4 × 100 m	2008	
Daniel Awde	WGEL	decathlon	2008, 2012	
Shana Cox	WGEL	400 m, 4 × 400 m	2012	
Tiffany Porter	WGEL	100 m hurdles	2012	
(Scotland) Mark Dry	WGEL	hammer throw	2016	
Cindy Ofili	WGEL	100 m hurdles	2016, 2020	
Phil Norman	WGEL	3000 m steeplechase	2020	
Daniel Rowden	WGEL	800 m	2020	

- English unless stated

== Club kit ==
The club vest is green and white alternating hoops, with black running shorts.
