= Blackheath and Bromley Harriers Athletic Club =

British athletics club

- Founded: 1869
- Ground: Norman Park
- Location: Bromley, Greater London, England BR2 9EG
- Coordinates: 51°23′12″N 0°01′17″E
- Website: www.bandbhac.org.uk

Blackheath & Bromley Harriers AC is an athletics club based in South-East London, England. It is based at the Hayes Lane, Bromley, Kent. It competes in division one of the British Athletics League, the premier division of the UK Women's Athletic League and the Southern Athletic League.

== History ==
The club was formed in October 1869 as Peckham Hare and Hounds, and by 1871 it had become the Peckham Athletic Club. A group of oarsmen, cricketers, gymnasts and general sportsmen would seem to be the earliest instance of a club deliberately incorporating both track and cross-country in the basic purposes of its existence.

Explosion of the population of London caused the club to move to "The Green Man" at Blackheath in July 1878 and to change its name to Blackheath Harriers. Under the presidency of Frederick H Reed from 1882 to 1905, membership soared to exceed 200 by 1883, and the Club provided many prominent competitors and officials for national and area athletics. In September 1898 the Gazette was first published and continues up to the present day for private circulation among Club members only.

Strong connections with the Territorials meant that the Boer War and then the First World War in 1914-18 placed considerable demands on the club, both in terms of the volunteers for active service and the pressures on those remaining to keep the Club in being. By 1922 they felt obliged to move out to West Wickham for cross-country and to Catford Bridge for track meetings.

From 1922 to 1927 H J Dyball served as Hon Secretary and was instrumental in the club's renaissance, with membership exceeding 500 by 1923. In 1926 Blackheath Harriers purchased its present freehold Clubhouse at Hayes for £850, which has since been added to, both in terms of extension to the building and additional land for car parking. Ownership actually resides in B H H Q Ltd, a company limited by guarantee, and all members of the club are members of the company.

The 1930s saw amateur athletics expand significantly, both for the club and in the general athletic world. It also saw the arrival of Blackheath's favourite son, Sydney Wooderson, who joined in 1931 - Sydney died on 21 December 2006 aged 92 years. He set world records of 4m 6.4s for the mile in 1937 and 1m 49.2s for 880 yards in 1938, both at Club meetings, and won European titles in 1938 and 1946 at 1500 and 5000 metres respectively.

Courtesy of many Club stalwarts, the Club never closed in the Second World War, so that in spite of National Service, membership topped 800 in 1947. For the next quarter century the likes of Victor Beardon (Club Secretary & Starter), Alan Brent (Cross-country), Norman Page (Track) and Jack Sims (Club Secretary) played prominent parts in the club's overall success. Strong performances in the Kinnaird, Ryder, Reading, Sward, Waddilove and other such trophy meetings over this golden period guaranteed Blackheath's inclusion in the National League (Division 1), newly formed in 1969, our centenary year.

Though relegated in the ‘seventies, Blackheath returned to the National League in 1979 and to Division 1 in 1984, hovering between Divisions 1 and 2 ever since. 1994 saw a double success, winning both the National Cross-Country and the National 6-stage Relay titles, and in 1995 the National Cross-Country title again and the National 12-Stage Relay. The National Young Athletes Boys Final was won for the 9th time in 1997, and the following year we took the national Junior League final for the second time, whilst Julian Golding became Commonwealth 200 m champion in Kuala Lumpur. Supporting teams participate regularly in the Southern Men’s, Veterans and Women’s Leagues.

In March 2003, Blackheath Harriers, Bromley merged with Bromley AC to become Blackheath & Bromley Harriers AC.

In 2022, the club acquired the community sports centre at Norman Park.

== Honours ==
Senior Men:

- English National Cross Country Championships
  - Winners: 1994, 1995

Senior Women:

- UK Women's Athletic League
  - Third Place: 2012

== Notable athletes ==
=== Olympic athletes ===
| Athlete | Club | Events | Games | Medals/Ref |
|---|---|---|---|---|
| Alfred Healey | Blackheath Harriers | 100 metres, 110 m hurdles | 1906, 1908 | |
| Cyril Seedhouse | Blackheath Harriers | 200, 400 metres, 4 × 400 metres relay | 1912 | Bronze medal |
| James Soutter | Blackheath Harriers | 400, 800 4 × 400 metres relay | 1912 | Bronze medal |
| Robert Lindsay | Blackheath Harriers | 400 metres, 4 × 400 metres relay | 1920 | Gold medal |
| Henri Dauban de Silhouette | Blackheath Harriers | javelin throw | 1924 | |
| Reggie Bell | Blackheath Harriers | 1500 metres | 1928 | |
| Ernie Page | Blackheath Harriers | 100 metres, 4 × 100 metres relay | 1932 | |
| Sydney Wooderson | Blackheath Harriers | 1500 metres | 1936 | |
| Charles Wiard | Blackheath Harriers | 4 × 100 metres relay | 1936 | |
| Jack Braughton | Blackheath Harriers | 5000 metres | 1948 | |
| John Herring | Blackheath Harriers | 5000 metres | 1964 | |
| John Watts | Blackheath Harriers | discus throw | 1972 | |
| Buster Watson | Blackheath Harriers | 200 metres | 1984 | |
| Myrtle Augee | Bromley Ladies | shot put | 1988, 1992 | |
| Shireen Bailey | Bromley Ladies | 800 m, 1500 m | 1988 | |
| Debbie Marti | Bromley Ladies | high jump | 1992, 1996 | |
| Tawanda Chiwira | Zimbabwe | 400 metres, 4 × 400 metres relay | 1996, 2000 | |
| Mark Steinle | Blackheath Harriers | marathon | 2000 | |
| Montell Douglas | B&B Harriers AC | 100 metres, 4 × 100 metres relay | 2008 | |
| Adam Gemili | B&B Harriers AC | 100 metres | 2012 | |
| Scott Overall | B&B Harriers AC | marathon | 2012 | |
| Dina Asher-Smith | B&B Harriers AC | 200 metres, 4 × 100 metres relay | 2016 | Bronze medal |
| Toby Olubi | B&B Harriers AC | bobsleigh | 2018 | |

=== Commonwealth Games ===
| Athlete | Club | Events | Games | Medals/Ref |
|---|---|---|---|---|
| Tony Wadhams | Blackheath Harriers | triple Jump | 1970 | |
