= Shaftesbury Barnet Harriers =

Athletics club in London, United Kingdom

- Founded: 1890
- Ground: Barnet Copthall Stadium
- Location: 1 Greenlands Lane, London NW4 1RL, England
- Coordinates: 51°36′13″N 0°13′25″W
- Website: official website

Shaftesbury Barnet Harriers are a UK athletics club based in Hendon, north west London. Their home track is Barnet Copthall Stadium or (StoneX Stadium for sponsorship purposes).

== History ==
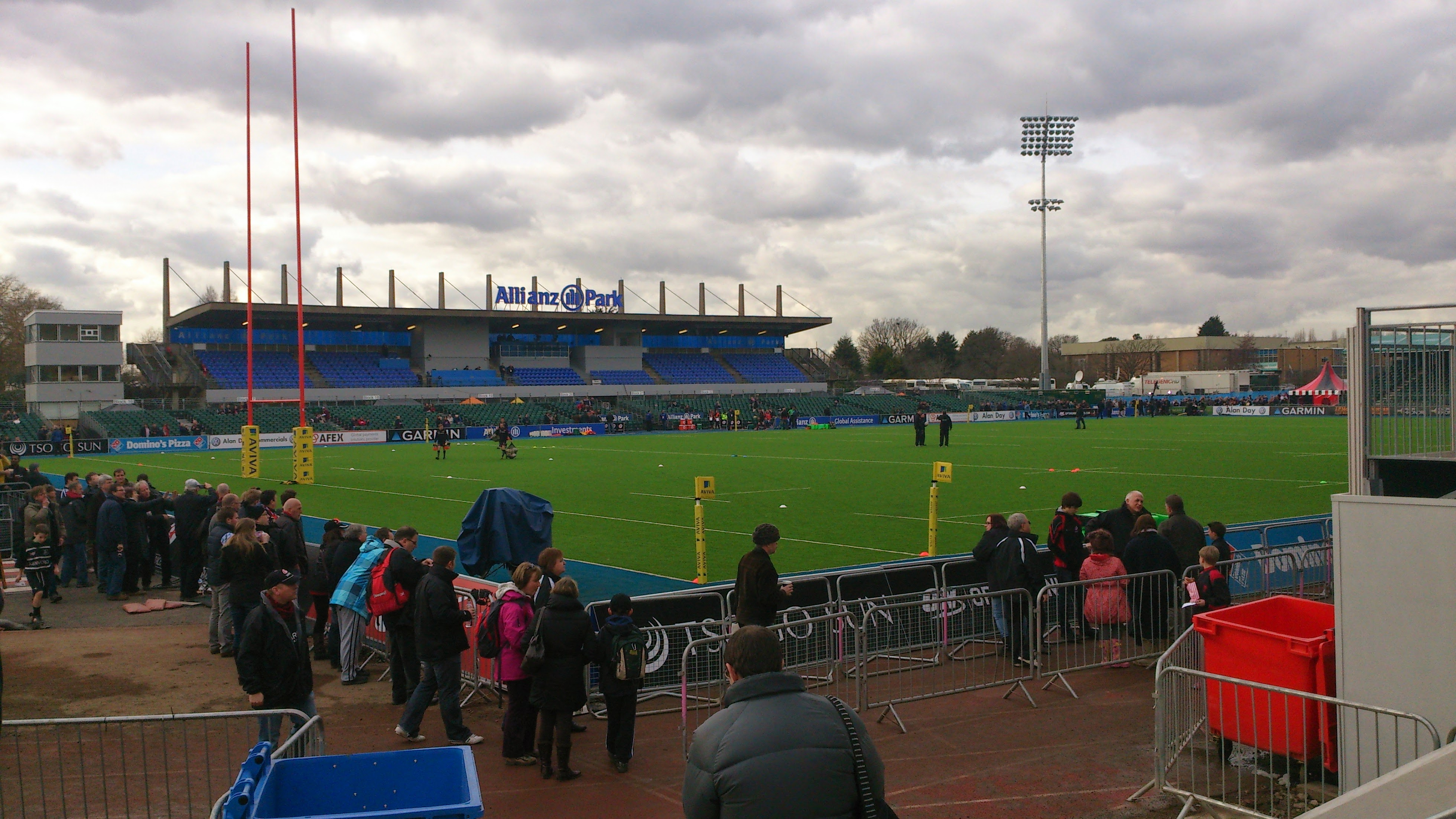
Barnet Copthall stadium during a rugby match in 2013

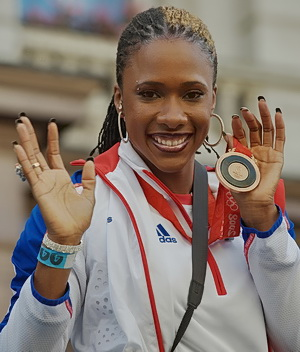
Natasha Danvers

Shaftesbury Barnet Harriers was founded in 1890 and amalgamated with Barnet Ladies in autumn 1986. The club qualified to enter the British Athletics League (BAL) in Division 4 in 1976, and in the space of 4 years achieved promotion to BAL Division 1 (now the Premiership).

The club has produced multiple Olympians. Trecia-Kaye Smith, the 2005 World Champion in the triple jump, was a member of the club.

== Honours ==
- British Athletics League, champions 2012, 2013
- UK Women's Athletic League, champions 1997, 1999
- English National Cross Country Championships (winners: 1998, 1999, 2000, 2002)

== Notable members ==
=== Olympians ===
Athlete	Events	Games	Medals/Ref
Dave Bedford	5000m, 10,000m	1972	
Joyce Smith	1500m, Marathon	1972, 1984	
Colin Boreham	Decathlon	1984	
Roy Dickens	4 × 400 m relay	1984	
Martin Gillingham	400m hurdles	1984	
Simmone Jacobs	4 × 100m relay	1984, 1988, 1992, 1996	Bronze medal
Donovan Reid	100 metres, 4 × 100m relay	1984	
(Kenya) Pascaline Bethuel	Marathon	1988, 1992	
Mike Jones	Hammer throw	1988	
(Cameroon) Fred Salle	Long jump	1988	
Francis Agyepong	Triple jump	1992, 1996	
Jacqui Agyepong	100m hurdles	1992	
David McKenzie	4 × 400m relay	1992	
(Nigeria) Chioma Ajunwa	100m, 4x100m, long jump	1996	Gold medal
(South Africa) Gwen Griffiths	1500m	1996	
Ashia Hansen	Triple jump	1996, 2000	
Nick Nieland	Javelin throw	1996, 2004	
Anthony Whiteman	1500 metres	1996, 2000	
(Wales) Neil Winter	pole vault	1996	
Larry Achike	Triple jump	2000, 2008	
Shani Anderson	100m, 4 x 100m relay	2000	
Natasha Danvers	400m hurdles	2000, 2008	Bronze medal
Catherine Murphy	4 × 400 metres relay	2000	
(Sudan) Yamile Aldama	Triple jump	2004, 2008, 2012	
(Scotland) Lee McConnell	400 metres, 4 × 400m relay	2004, 2008, 2012	
Abi Oyepitan	200 metres, 4 × 100m relay	2004	
Nick Smith	4 x 100m relay	2004	
(Jamaica) Trecia Smith	Triple jump	2004, 2008, 2012	
Marilyn Okoro	800 metres, 4 × 400m relay	2008, 2012	Bronze medal
(Scotland) Allan Scott	110 metres hurdles	2008	
Emma Ania	4 × 100 metres relay	2008	
(Republic of Ireland) Michelle Carey	4 × 400 metres relay	2012	
(South Africa) Willem Coertzen	Decathlon	2012	
Chris Bennett	Hammer throw	2016	
Ojie Edoburun	4 x 100 metres relay	2016	
Jade Lally	Discus throw	2016	
Daryll Neita	100m, 4x100m relay	2016, 2020	Bronze medal
(Scotland) Beth Potter	10,000 metres, triathlon	2016, 2024	,
Sebastian Rodger	400 metres hurdles	2016	
Lizzie Bird	3000m steeplechase	2020, 2024	
Zharnel Hughes	100m, 4x100m	2020, 2024	Bronze medal
Michael Ohioze	4x400m	2020	
Lina Nielsen	400m hurdles, 4x400m relay	2024	
Nicholas Percy	Discus Throw	2024	

- English unless stated

== Club kit ==
The club kit is a white and black vertically striped vest or crop top with red trim, with red or black running shorts or hotpants.
