= 1998 AAA Championships =

- Dates: 24–26 July
- Host city: Birmingham, England
- Venue: Alexander Stadium
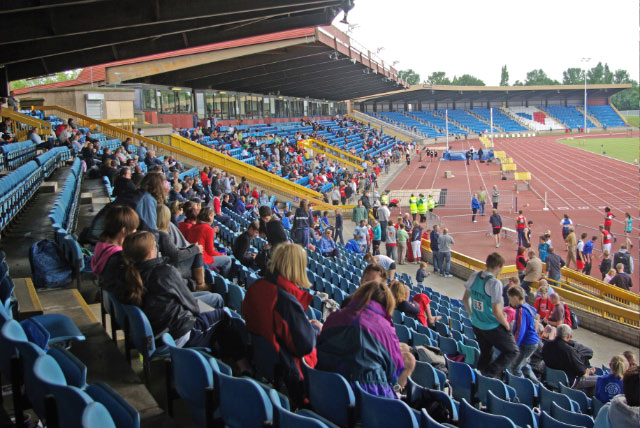
- Level: Senior
- Type: Outdoor

The 1998 AAA Championships sponsored by Bupa, was an outdoor track and field competition organised by the Amateur Athletic Association (AAA), held from 24 to 26 July at Alexander Stadium in Birmingham, England. The event served as the de facto national championships for the United Kingdom.

== Medal summary ==
=== Men ===
Event	Gold		Silver		Bronze	
100m	Darren Campbell	10.22	Dwain Chambers	10.23	Marlon Devonish	10.26
200m	(Scotland) Dougie Walker	20.35	(Wales) Doug Turner	20.55	Julian Golding	20.88
400m	(Wales) Iwan Thomas	44.50	Mark Richardson	44.62	Solomon Wariso	44.68
800m	Jason Lobo	1:49.68	(Scotland) Grant Graham	1:49.73	(Northern Ireland) Eddie King	1:49.74
1,500m	John Mayock	3:39.38	Anthony Whiteman	3:39.52	Matthew Yates	3:40.38
3,000m	Nick Comerford	8:11.98	Allen Graffin; Dave Taylor	8:12.41	Not awarded	
5,000m	Karl Keska	13:41.61	(Wales) Jon Brown	13:41.72	Keith Cullen	13:43.15
10,000m	(Northern Ireland) Dermot Donnelly	28:43.17	Carl Thackery	28:52.71	Rob Denmark	29:17.72
110m hurdles	(Wales) Colin Jackson	13.37	Tony Jarrett	13.42	Damien Greaves	13.88
400m hurdles	(Wales) Paul Gray	49.81	Anthony Borsumato	49.85	Chris Rawlinson	50.20
3000m steeplechase	(Wales) Christian Stephenson	8:32.76	Spencer Duval	8:36.37	Craig Wheeler	8:42.83
10,000m walk	(Scotland) Martin Bell	41:48.81	(Isle of Man) Steve Partington	42:27.21	Andi Drake	42:46.26
high jump	Dalton Grant	2.20 m	Stuart Ohrland Stanley Osuide Brendan Reilly	2.15 m	Not awarded	
pole vault	Kevin Hughes	5.40 m	Matt Belsham	5.35 m	Ian Tullett	5.35 m
long jump	Nathan Morgan	8.11 m	Chris Davidson	7.71 m	Steve Phillips	7.48 m
triple jump	Jonathan Edwards	17.12 m	Larry Achike	16.42 m	Julian Golley	16.28 m
shot put	Mark Proctor	19.50 m	(Wales) Shaun Pickering	18.87 m	Mark Edwards	18.52 m
discus throw	Bob Weir	62.82 m	Glen Smith	60.56 m	Emeka Udechuku	57.90 m
hammer throw	Mick Jones	72.13 m	Paul Head	69.46 m	Bill Beauchamp	66.56 m
javelin throw	Steve Backley	84.78 m	Mick Hill	81.55 m	Mark Roberson	78.93 m
decathlon	Rafer Joseph	7126 pts	(Republic of Ireland) Joe Naughton	6870 pts	William Wynn	6700 pts

=== Women ===
Event	Gold		Silver		Bronze	
100m	Joice Maduaka	11.40	Marcia Richardson	11.46	Simmone Jacobs	11.56
200m	Katharine Merry	23.46	Joice Maduaka	23.48	Marcia Richardson	23.71
400m	(Scotland) Allison Curbishley	50.92	Donna Fraser	51.47	Michelle Thomas	53.25
800m	Diane Modahl	2:02.73	Tanya Blake	2:03.83	(Northern Ireland) Amanda Crowe	2:05.40
1,500m	Lynn Gibson	4:12.72	Helen Pattinson	4:12.87	Angela Davies	4:13.55
3,000m	Amanda Parkinson	9:34.74	Debbie Sullivan	9:36.90	Jilly Ingman	9:53.98
5,000m	Andrea Whitcombe	15:43.03	Sarah Young	15:45.08	Tara Krzywicki	15:53.28
10,000m	Tara Krzywicki	34:37.04	Hayley Nash	34:45.57	Angie Joiner	34:47.41
100m hurdles	Keri Maddox	13.20	Clova Court	13.34	Liz Fairs	13.52
400m hurdles	Natasha Danvers	56.27	Gowry Retchakan	56.57	Keri Maddox	56.76
5,000m walk	(Republic of Ireland) Gillian O'Sullivan	21:52.68	Lisa Kehler	22:01.53	Vicky Lupton	23:32.48
10,000m walk	Pam Phillips	64:08.9	Pam Ficken	67:32.8	Victoria Mountfield	75:14.8
high jump	Joanne Jennings	1.88 m	Susan Jones	1.85 m	Michelle Dunkley	1.85 m
pole vault	Janine Whitlock	4.10 m	Rhian Clarke	3.80 m	Paula Wilson	3.80 m
long jump	Denise Lewis	6.44 m	Tracy Joseph	6.24 m	Andrea Coore	6.23 m
triple jump	Connie Henry	13.90 m	Michelle Griffith	13.84 m	(Scotland) Kerensa Denham	12.42 m
shot put	Judy Oakes	17.82 m	Myrtle Augee	17.39 m	Maggie Lynes	15.73 m
discus throw	Shelley Drew	60.82 m	(Northern Ireland) Jackie McKernan	57.09 m	Philippa Roles	54.14 m
hammer throw	Lorraine Shaw	60.71 m	Lyn Sprules	59.20 m	Rachael Beverley	57.97 m
javelin throw	(Scotland) Lorna Jackson	57.89 m	Shelley Holroyd	54.16 m	Karen Martin	53.17 m
heptathlon	Clova Court	5639 pts	Kim Crowther	4680 pts	Natalie Butler	4561 pts
