= 1997 British Athletics Championships =

Track and field championship

- Dates: 12 & 13 July 1997
- Host city: Birmingham, England
- Venue: Alexander Stadium
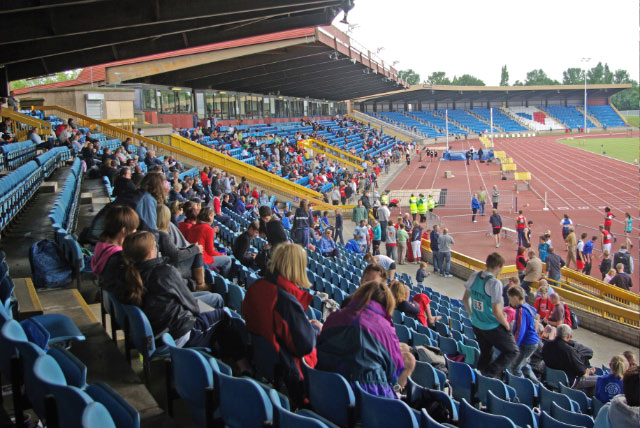
- Level: Senior
- Type: Outdoor

The 1997 BAF British Championships sponsored by Bupa, was the national championship in outdoor track and field for the United Kingdom, held at Alexander Stadium, Birmingham. The 10,000 metres event was hosted separately at the Sheffield Hallam UCA Stadium. The event doubled up as the 1997 World Championships trials.

Organised by the British Athletics Federation (BAF), the competition was limited to British athletes only and marked a replacement to the UK Athletics Championships, which had last been held in 1993. The BAF British Championships overshadowed that year's AAA Championships, which was open to foreign competitors and typically the most prominent meet on the domestic calendar. This has led some statisticians, such as the National Union of Track Statisticians (NUTS), to judge the British Championships event as the main national championships for the country for 1997. Many of the athletes below also competed at the 1997 AAA Championships.

The bankruptcy of the British Athletics Federation that same year effectively rendered the competition defunct. The British Athletics Championships returned ten years later in 2007, organised by UK Athletics – the government-led successor organisation to the British Athletics Federation.

The main international track and field competition for the United Kingdom that year was the 1997 World Championships in Athletics. British javelin champion Steve Backley claimed world silver in Athens. UK runners-up Colin Jackson and Denise Lewis were also both runners-up at the global level.

== Medals ==
=== Men ===
Event	Gold		Silver		Bronze	
100m	(Scotland) Ian Mackie	10.28	Darren Campbell	10.29	Dwain Chambers	10.42
200m (wind: +2.3 m/s)	(Scotland) Dougie Walker	20.63 w	Owusu Dako	20.70 w	(Wales) Douglas Turner	20.87 w
400m	(Wales) Iwan Thomas	44.36	Mark Richardson	44.84	(Wales) Jamie Baulch	45.02
800m	Andy Hart	1:46.36	Mark Sesay	1:47.36	(Scotland) Paul Walker	1:47.82
1,500m	John Mayock	3:39.69	Kevin McKay	3:39.93	Matthew Yates	3:40.66
5,000m	Adrian Passey	13:38.21	Robert Denmark	13:39.29	(Scotland) Ian Gillespie	13:39.72
10,000m	Ian Hudspith	28:35.11	Glynn Tromans	28:35.32	Dermot Donnelly	28:38.56
110m hurdles	Tony Jarrett	13.33	(Wales) Colin Jackson	13.39	Andrew Tulloch	13.85
400m hurdles	Chris Rawlinson	49.69	Gary Jennings	50.02	Paul Gray	50.38
3000m steeplechase	Rob Hough	8:41.44	Spencer Duval	8:46.17	Matt O'Dowd	8:47.99
10,000 m walk	Andrew Penn	42:21.89	Martin Bell	42:31.19	Mark Easton	42:37.98
high jump	Brendan Reilly	2.28 m	Dalton Grant	2.20 m	David Barnetson	2.17 m
pole vault	Paul Williamson	5.40 m	Kevin Hughes	5.40 m	Nick Buckfield	5.30 m
long jump	Steve Phillips	7.58 m	Chris Davidson	7.52 m	Oni Onuorah	7.45 m
triple jump	Francis Agyepong	16.48 m	Julian Golley	16.34 m	Larry Achike	15.77 m
shot put	(Wales) Shaun Pickering	19.25 m	Matt Simson	19.11 m	(Scotland) Steph Hayward	18.19 m
discus throw	Robert Weir	63.74 m	Kevin Brown	59.44 m	Glen Smith	58.62 m
hammer throw	Paul Head	71.58 m	David Smith	70.92 m	Mick Jones	69.68 m
javelin throw	Steve Backley	86.20 m	Mick Hill	81.02 m	Nick Nieland	78.64 m

=== Women ===
Event	Gold		Silver		Bronze	
100m	Simmone Jacobs	11.50	Marcia Richardson	11.58	Beverly Kinch	11.62
200m	Katharine Merry	23.19	Simmone Jacobs	23.49	Donna Fraser	23.61
400m	Donna Fraser	51.82	Michelle Pierre	53.13	Lorraine Hanson	53.73
800m	Kelly Holmes	1:58.59	Hayley Parry	2:02.20	Claire Raven	2:03.15
1,500m	Joanne Pavey	4:18.57	Angela Davies	4:20.86	Lynn Gibson	4:21.29
5,000m	Paula Radcliffe	15:30.36	(Scotland) Yvonne Murray	15:39.08	(Scotland) Lynne MacDougall	16:04.01
110,000m	(Scotland) Vikki McPherson	33:30.81	Joanne Thompson	33:38.36	Lucy Wright	33:41.16
100m hurdles	Angie Thorp	13.34	Jacqui Agyepong	13.38	Clova Court	13.46
400m hurdles	Sally Gunnell	55.33	Alyson Layzell	57.44	Keri Maddox	58.52
5000 m walk	Sylvia Black	23:56.72	Catherine Charnock	25:26.25	Lynn Bradley	26:47.67
high jump	Debbie Marti	1.91 m	Susan Jones	1.88 m	Joanne Jennings	1.85 m
Pole vault	Janine Whitlock	4.00 m	Louise Schramm	3.70 m	Paula Wilson	3.60 m
long jump	Joanne Wise	6.47 m	Denise Lewis	6.41 m	Tracy Joseph	6.24 m
triple jump	Ashia Hansen	14.10 m	Michelle Griffith	13.11 m	Connie Henry	12.48 m
shot put	Judy Oakes	18.42 m	Myrtle Augee	16.74 m	Tracy Axten	14.71 m
discus throw	Shelley Drew	58.16 m	Tracy Axten	53.86 m	(Northern Ireland) Jackie McKernan	53.28 m
hammer throw	Sarah Moore	56.60 m	Ann Gardner	54.00 m	Liz Pidgeon	52.10 m
javelin throw	Tessa Sanderson	58.30 m	Shelley Holroyd	55.20 m	Karen Martin	54.66 m
