= 2001 AAA Championships =

Track & field competition

- Dates: 13–15 July
- Host city: Birmingham, England
- Venue: Alexander Stadium
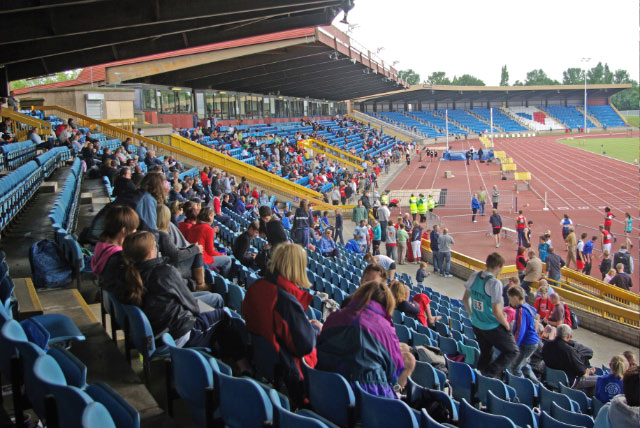
- Level: Senior
- Type: Outdoor

The 2001 AAA Championships sponsored by Norwich Union, was an outdoor track and field competition organised by the Amateur Athletic Association (AAA), held from 13–15 July at Alexander Stadium in Birmingham, England. It was considered the de facto national championships for the United Kingdom and was a qualifier for the 2001 World Championships in Athletics.

Following demands from women athletes, a 2001 UK Athletics Championships was held separately specifically for the newly introduced women's 3000 metres steeplechase event. This event was added to the AAA programme in response the following year.

== Medal summary ==
=== Men ===
Event	Gold		Silver		Bronze	
100m	Dwain Chambers	10.01	Mark Lewis-Francis	10.12	(Wales) Christian Malcolm	10.21
200m	Marlon Devonish	20.52	(Wales) Christian Malcolm	20.63	Dwain Chambers	20.65
400m	Mark Richardson	45.79	(Wales) Iwan Thomas	46.00	Mark Hylton	46.36
800m	Neil Speaight	1:49.63	James McIlroy	1:49.95	Grant Cuddy	1:50.47
1,500m	John Mayock	3:44.05	Anthony Whiteman	3:44.40	Tom Mayo	3:44.52
5,000m	Jon Wild	13:52.72	Matt O'Dowd	13:53.53	Mark Miles	13:53.74
10,000m	Glynn Tromans	28:31.33	Jon Wild	28:39.33	(Scotland) Glen Stewart	28:40.14
110m hurdles	Tony Jarrett	13.66	Damien Greaves	13.68	Dominic Bradley	13.83
400m hurdles	Chris Rawlinson	48.68	Du'aine Ladejo	49.44	Anthony Borsumato	49.53
3000m steeplechase	Ben Whitby	8:32.68	Stuart Stokes	8:33.15	(Wales) Christian Stephenson	8:39.33
5000m walk	Lloyd Finch	20:47.23	Steve Hollier	21:04.36	Chris Cheeseman	21:05.29
high jump	Ben Challenger	2.17 m	Dalton Grant	2.12 m	Ian Holliday	2.07 m
pole vault	Paul Williamson	5.30 m	Tim Thomas	5.30 m	Ashley Swain	5.20 m
long jump	Nathan Morgan	7.80 m	Darren Thompson	7.52 m	Chris Davidson	7.37 m w
triple jump	Jonathan Edwards	17.59 m	Larry Achike	16.99 m	Phillips Idowu	16.88 m
shot put	Mark Proctor	18.38 m	Emeka Udechuku	18.01 m	Scott Rider	16.86 m
discus throw	Glen Smith	59.99 m	Robert Weir	59.92 m	Perriss Wilkins	56.89 m
hammer throw	Mick Jones	74.40 m	Paul Head	70.33 m	Simon Bown	64.76 m
javelin throw	Mark Roberson	80.80 m	Mick Hill	79.98 m	Nick Nieland	77.91 m
decathlon	John Heanley	7129 pts	Darren Hatton	7019 pts	(Canada) James Holder	6999 pts

=== Women ===
Event	Gold		Silver		Bronze	
100m (wind: +2.3 m/s)	Sarah Wilhelmy	11.41 w	Amanda Forrester	11.42 w	Joice Maduaka	11.42 w
200m	(Republic of Ireland) Sarah Reilly	23.42	Shani Anderson	23.43	Susie Williams	23.79
400m	Lesley Owusu	52.27	Donna Fraser	52.57	(Scotland) Lee McConnell	52.93
800m	Kelly Holmes	2:02.61	Tanya Blake	2:04.08	(Wales) Hayley Tullett	2:04.67
1,500m	Helen Pattinson	4:14.49	Liz Yelling	4:15.01	Ellen Leggate	4:16.13
5,000m	Jo Pavey	15:15.98	Hayley Yelling	15:23.28	(Scotland) Kathy Butler	15:34.12
10,000m	Penny Thackray	33:25.74	Bev Jenkins	33:29.27	(Scotland) Sheila Fairweather	34:23.55
100m hurdles	Diane Allahgreen	13.11	Melani Wilkins	13.24	Keri Maddox	13.35
400m hurdles	(Scotland) Sinead Dudgeon	56.37	Keri Maddox	58.00	Hannah Wood	60.24
5000m walk	Niobe Menéndez	23:46.30	Sharon Tonks	24:20.46	Wendy Bennett	24:35.85
high jump	Susan Jones	1.91 m	Michelle Dunkley	1.86 m	Julie Hollman Kerry Jury	1.68 m
pole vault	Janine Whitlock	4.40 m	Lucy Webber	4.00 m	Irie Hill	4.00 m
long jump	Ann Danson	6.15 m	Julie Hollman	6.09 m	Kelly Sotherton	5.99 m
triple jump	Ashia Hansen	14.09 m	Debbie Rowe	12.96 m w	Rebecca White	12.85 m
shot put	Jo Duncan	16.84 m	Julie Dunkley	16.31 m	Eva Massey	15.32 m
discus throw	Shelley Drew	57.22 m	(Wales) Philippa Roles	53.45 m	Vickie Foster	46.94 m
hammer throw	Lorraine Shaw	66.97 m	Lyn Sprules	59.38 m	Zoe Derham	59.30 m
javelin throw	Karen Martin	54.82 m	Kelly Morgan	54.49 m	(Scotland) Lorna Jackson	52.74 m
heptathlon	(Scotland) Laura Redmond	5068 pts	Kate Brewington	4969 pts	Charmaine Johnson	4908 pts
