= 1997 AAA Championships =

- Dates: 24–25 August
- Host city: Birmingham, England
- Venue: Alexander Stadium
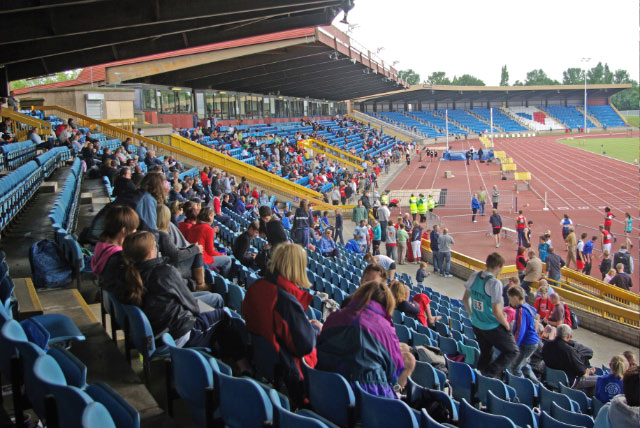
- Level: Senior
- Type: Outdoor

This refers to the Amateur Athletic Association not the American Automobile Association.

The 1997 AAA Championships was an outdoor track and field competition organised by the Amateur Athletic Association (AAA), held from 24 to 25 August at Alexander Stadium in Birmingham, England.

For the first time, it was not considered the national championships for the United Kingdom, as the 1997 British Athletics Championships (which incorporated the trials for the 1997 World Championships in Athletics) attracted a higher standard of national competitors than the AAA event. The British Athletics Federation's decision to hold its trials separately was taken due to the organisation's financial problems, which would ultimately result in its bankruptcy.

== Medal summary ==
=== Men ===
Event	Gold		Silver		Bronze	
100m	Jason Gardener	10.31	Jason Livingston	10.38	(Sierra Leone) Josephus Thomas	10.42
200m	Marlon Devonish	20.65	Allyn Condon	20.94	(Sierra Leone) Josephus Thomas	21.01
400m	Kent Ulyatt	46.86	Dan Donovan	47.24	David Nolan	47.35
800m	(Republic of Ireland) James Nolan	1:51.47	Noel Edwards	1:51.73	Andi Knight	1:51.78
1,500m	Richard Ashe	3:54.37	Luke Veness	3:54.62	Adam Zawadzki	3:54.76
3,000m	(Republic of Ireland) Cormac Finnerty	8:08.83	Allen Graffin	8:15.54	Nick Comerford	8:16.88
5,000m	Kristen Bowditch	13:53.12	Spencer Barden	13:55.29	Paul Green	13:56.27
10,000m	Mark Steinle	29:27.98	Dave Taylor	29:29.59	(Scotland) Stuart Bell	29:38.09
110m hurdles	Damien Greaves	14.02	Matthew Clements	14.13	Martyn Hendry	14.16
400m hurdles	(Scotland) Charles Robertson-Adams	51.01	Paul Thompson	51.11	Matthew Douglas	51.70
3000m steeplechase	Spencer Duval	8:45.91	Matt O'Dowd	8:51.55	Andy Morgan-Lee	8:53.51
10,000m walk	Philip King	42:32.32	(Isle of Man) Steve Partington	42:48.39	(Republic of Ireland) Pierce O'Callaghan	45:35.02
high jump	(Republic of Ireland) Mark Mandy	2.20 m	Brendan Reilly	2.15 m	(Scotland) David Barnetson	2.15 m
pole vault	(Wales) Tim Thomas	5.30 m	Dean Mellor	5.20 m	Kevin Hughes	5.00 m
long jump	Steve Phillips	7.57 m	Chris Davidson	7.34 m	Barrington Williams	7.30 m
triple jump	Francis Agyepong	16.71 m	Tosi Fasinro	15.92 m	Femi Akinsanya	15.81 m
shot put	(Scotland) Steph Hayward	17.26 m	Carl Myerscough	16.99 m	David Callaway	16.28 m
discus throw	Bob Weir	61.60 m	Kevin Brown	57.30 m	Glen Smith	56.56 m
hammer throw	Paul Head	70.66 m	Mick Jones	67.88 m	Chris Howe	62.56 m
javelin throw	Mark Roberson	77.22 m	(Republic of Ireland) Terry McHugh	70.50 m	Stuart Faben	65.04 m
decathlon	(Scotland) Alexis Sharp	7500 pts	Anthony Southward	6841 pts	Mark Bushell	6822 pts

=== Women ===
Event	Gold		Silver		Bronze	
100m	(Jamaica) Evadnie McKenzie	11.63	Donna Fraser	11.74	Shani Anderson	11.76
200m	Sharon Tunaley	23.91	Tracy Joseph	23.94	Sharon Williams	24.18
400m	Lorraine Hanson	53.45	(Northern Ireland) Stephanie Llewellyn	53.65	Jo Sloane	55.17
800m	(Northern Ireland) Amanda Crowe	2:04.66	Claire Raven	2:05.87	(Republic of Ireland) Freda Davoren	2:06.00
1,500m	Dianne Henaghan	4:16.19	Helen Pattinson	4:19.43	Joanne Colleran	4:20.03
3,000m	Debbie Sullivan	9:34.30	Jillian Jones	9:38.71	Michelle Wannell	9:53.05
5,000m	Andrea Whitcombe	16:07.26	Sarah Young	16:10.15	Penny Thackray	16:16.01
100m hurdles	Angie Thorp	13.56	Rachel King	13.65	Melani Wilkins	13.77
400m hurdles	Keri Maddox	57.69	Alyson Layzell	57.83	Maggie Still	60.19
5,000m walk	(Republic of Ireland) Olive Loughnane	24:09.18	Catherine Charnock	25:00.97	Nikki Huckerby	25:41.85
10,000m walk	Catherine Charnock	54:33.6	Sally Warren	56:21.4	Sally Hall	57:34.5
high jump	Debbie Marti	1.90 m	Joanne Jennings	1.83 m	Michelle Dunkley	1.83 m
pole vault	Janine Whitlock	3.80 m	Paula Wilson	3.75 m	Kim Rothman	3.40 m
long jump	Andrea Coore	6.22 m	Sarah Claxton	6.10 m	(Scotland) Ruth Irving	5.88 m
triple jump	Kate Evans	12.58 m	(Scotland) Karen Skeggs	12.42 m	(Scotland) Nikki Barr	12.11 m w
shot put	Judy Oakes	17.89 m	Myrtle Augee	16.41 m	(Scotland) Alison Grey	14.56 m
discus throw	(Northern Ireland) Jackie McKernan	56.00 m	(Wales) Philippa Roles	50.68 m	Tracy Axten	49.76 m
hammer throw	Lyn Sprules	61.18 m	Sarah Moore	54.16 m	Helen Arnold	52.10 m
javelin throw	Karen Martin	50.38 m	Lucy Stevenson	47.84 m	(Scotland) Lorna Jackson	46.26 m
heptathlon	Clova Court	5712 pts	Julie Hollman	5577 pts	Diana Bennett	5550 pts
