= 1993 AAA Championships =

British athletics event

- Dates: 16–17 July
- Host city: Birmingham, England
- Venue: Alexander Stadium
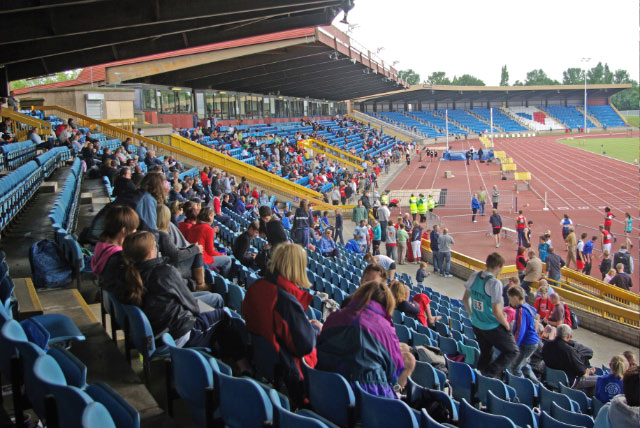
- Level: Senior
- Type: Outdoor

The 1993 AAA Championships sponsored by Panasonic, was an outdoor track and field competition organised by the Amateur Athletic Association (AAA), held from 16 to 17 July at Alexander Stadium in Birmingham, England.

It was considered the de facto national championships for the United Kingdom, ahead of the 1993 UK Athletics Championships.

== Medal summary ==
=== Men ===
Event	Gold		Silver		Bronze	
100m	Linford Christie	10.13	(Australia) Dean Capobianco	10.25	John Regis	10.32
200m (wind: +2.9 m/s)	(United States) Jeff Williams	20.47 w	Toby Box	20.85 w	Darren Campbell	20.89 w
400m	(Kenya) Kennedy Ochieng	45.32	Ade Mafe	45.64	David McKenzie	45.75
800m	Martin Steele	1:47.83	(South Africa) Hezekiél Sepeng	1:47.84	(Scotland) Tom McKean	1:48.06
1,500m	Matthew Yates	3:38.75	Robert Denmark	3:39.62	Matt Barnes	3:40.06
3,000m	(Kenya) Joseph Keter	7:56.39	(Australia) Peter O'Donoghue	7:58.99	(Republic of Ireland) Nick O'Brien	8:03.09
5,000m	(Wales) Jon Brown	13:35.67	Gary Staines	13:37.08	John Nuttall	13:38.17
10,000m^{[A]}	Paul Evans	28:17.49	David Lewis	28:32.00	Billy Dee	28:33.75
110m hurdles	(Wales) Colin Jackson	13.15	Tony Jarrett	13.37	(Australia) Kyle Vander Kuyp	13.60
400m hurdles	Gary Cadogan	50.60	Peter Crampton	50.75	(South Africa) Ferrins Pieterse	50.80
3000m steeplechase	Colin Walker	8:33.45	(Saudi Arabia) Saad Al-Asmari	8:34.50	(Wales) Justin Chaston	8:34.64
10,000m walk	(Scotland) Martin Bell	42:29.63	Mark Easton	42:38.47	Andrew Penn	42:51.86
high jump	(Australia) Tim Forsyth	2.32 m	Steve Smith	2.30 m	Dalton Grant (Scotland) Geoff Parsons	2.20 m
pole vault	(Australia) Simon Arkell	5.60 m	(United States) Tim Bright	5.50 m	(United States) Pat Manson	5.40 m
long jump	Fred Salle	7.72 m	Barrington Williams	7.71 m	Ian Simpson	7.53 m
triple jump	Francis Agyepong	16.05 m	Derek Browne	15.66 m	(Scotland) John MacKenzie	15.64 m
shot put	Matt Simson	18.79 m	(Wales) Paul Edwards	18.56 m	(Australia) John Minns	17.93 m
discus throw	Bob Weir	57.44 m	(South Africa) Frits Potgieter	56.48 m	(Norway) Kjell Ove Hauge	54.58 m
hammer throw	Paul Head	72.32 m	Jason Byrne	68.14 m	David Smith	68.06 m
javelin throw	Colin Mackenzie	81.44 m	Mark Roberson	78.96 m	(Australia) Andrew Currey	74.68 m
decathlon	(Republic of Ireland) Barry Walsh	7275 pts	Barry Thomas	7121 pts	Steve Rogers	7014 pts

=== Women ===
Event	Gold		Silver		Bronze	
100m	Beverly Kinch	11.44	(Australia) Melinda Gainsford	11.47	Simmone Jacobs	11.52
200m	(Australia) Cathy Freeman	22.71	(Australia) Melinda Gainsford	23.02	Simmone Jacobs	23.49
400m	Phylis Smith	52.15	(Australia) Kylie Hanigan	52.68	(Norway) Sølvi Meinseth	53.70
800m	Kelly Holmes	2:02.69	Linda Keough	2:03.93	Lynn Gibson	2:04.92
1,500m	Alison Wyeth	4:11.03	(United States) Kathy Franey	4:13.87	Sonia McGeorge	4:14.13
3,000m^{[A]}	(Scotland) Yvonne Murray	8:52.28	Alison Wyeth	8:56.87	Sonia McGeorge	9:01.65
5,000m	Suzanne Rigg	15:57.67	(New Zealand) Lesley Morton	16:00.20	Alison Barnes	16:12.73
10,000m	(Scotland) Vikki McPherson	33:49.29	(Scotland) Laura Adam	34:00.12	(Scotland) Alison Rose	34:35.73
100m hurdles	Sally Gunnell	13.08	Jacqui Agyepong	13.15	(Norway) Monica Grefstad	13.33
400m hurdles	Jacqui Parker	58.14	Jennie Pearson	59.09	Jayne Puckeridge	59.35
5,000m walk	Vicky Lupton	22:34.50	Julie Drake	22:37.47	(Australia) Jane Saville	23:17.06
10,000m walk	(Scotland) Verity Larby	47:10.07	Vicky Lupton	47:37.32	(Isle of Man) Cal Partington	50:43.87
high jump	Debbie Marti	1.86 m	(Republic of Ireland) Sharon Foley	1.83 m	(United States) Gwen Wentland	1.83 m
pole vault	Kate Staples	3.20 m	Claire Morrison	2.90 m	Louise Schramm	2.90 m
long jump	(Australia) Nicole Boegman	6.50 m	Joanne Wise	6.26 m	Denise Lewis	6.19 m
triple jump	(Norway) Lene Espegren	13.43 m	Rachel Kirby	13.41 m	Ashia Hansen	13.16 m
shot put	Myrtle Augee	17.24 m	(Sweden) Linda-Marie Mårtensson	15.67 m	Maggie Lynes	15.48 m
discus throw	(Australia) Daniela Costian	61.58 m	Tracy Axten	54.40 m	Debbie Callaway	53.28 m
hammer throw	(Australia) Deborah Sosimenko	56.86 m	Esther Augee	52.22 m	Lorraine Shaw	51.76 m
javelin throw	Shelley Holroyd	60.10 m	Sharon Gibson	59.58 m	Mandy Liverton	53.22 m
Heptathlon	Clova Court	5957 pts	Denise Lewis	5774 pts	Vikki Schofield	5268 pts

== Notes ==
^{1} ^{2} The men's 10,000 metres and women's 3000 metres races took place during the UK Championships on 11 and 12 June 1993 in London.

== Other AAA titles ==
Event	Gold		Silver		Bronze	
men's marathon	Eamonn Martin	2:10:50	Dave Buzza	2:12:24	(Wales) Steve Brace	2:14:00
Women's marathon	(Scotland) Liz McColgan	2:29:37	Gillian Horovitz	2:42:14	Danielle Sanderson	2:42:37

- + AAA marathon determined by 1993 London Marathon placings
