= 2000 AAA Championships =

- Dates: 11–13 August
- Host city: Birmingham, England
- Venue: Alexander Stadium
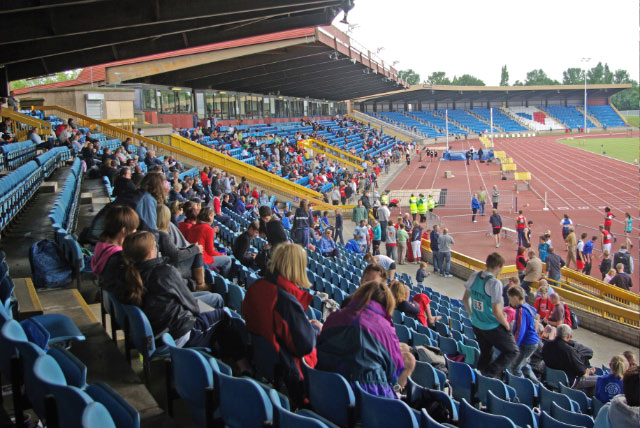
- Level: Senior
- Type: Outdoor

The 2000 AAA Championships sponsored by Norwich Union, was an outdoor track and field competition organised by the Amateur Athletic Association (AAA), held from 11–13 August at Alexander Stadium in Birmingham, England. It was considered the de facto national championships for the United Kingdom.

The competition acted as the trials event for selection for Great Britain at the 2000 Summer Olympics.

== Medal summary ==
=== Men ===
| Event | Gold | | Silver | | Bronze | |
|---|---|---|---|---|---|---|
| 100m | Dwain Chambers | 10.11 | Darren Campbell | 10.12 | Mark Lewis-Francis | 10.24 |
| 200m | Darren Campbell | 20.49 | (Wales) Christian Malcolm | 20.59 | Marlon Devonish | 20.78 |
| 400m | Mark Richardson | 45.55 | Sean Baldock | 45.71 | (Wales) Jamie Baulch | 46.07 |
| 800m | (Northern Ireland) James McIlroy | 1:50.08 | Andy Hart | 1:50.09 | Ally Donaldson | 1:50.57 |
| 1,500m | John Mayock | 3:45.29 | Anthony Whiteman | 3:45.57 | (Scotland) Jon McCallum | 3:46.14 |
| 5,000m | (Wales) Andres Jones | 13:45.86 | Mike Openshaw | 13:49.34 | Mark Hudspith | 13:52.74 |
| 10,000m | (Wales) Andres Jones | 28:00.50 | Rob Denmark | 28:03.31 | Mark Steinle | 28:04.48 |
| 110m hurdles | (Wales) Colin Jackson | 13.54 | Tony Jarrett | 13.78 | Damien Greaves | 13.85 |
| 400m hurdles | Chris Rawlinson | 48.95 | Anthony Borsumato | 49.71 | Matt Douglas | 49.89 |
| 3000m steeplechase | (Wales) Christian Stephenson | 8:28.21 | Justin Chaston | 8:32.21 | Craig Wheeler | 8:39.72 |
| 10,000m walk | Matt Hales | 43:12.85 | (Isle of Man) Steve Partington | 43:30.50 | Jamie O'Rawe | 43:54.49 |
| high jump | Ben Challenger | 2.22 m | (Republic of Ireland) Brendan Reilly | 2.22 m | Stuart Ohrland | 2.17 m |
| pole vault | Kevin Hughes | 5.50 m | Paul Williamson | 5.40 m | Ben Flint | 5.30 m |
| long jump | George Audu | 7.89 m | (Scotland) Darren Ritchie | 7.84 m | Darren Thompson | 7.48 m |
| triple jump | Phillips Idowu | 16.87 m | Larry Achike | 16.83 m | Francis Agyepong | 16.40 m |
| shot put | (Scotland) Steph Hayward | 18.24 m | Emeka Udechuku | 17.47 m | Mark Proctor | 17.21 m |
| discus throw | Bob Weir | 62.13 m | Glen Smith | 60.84 m | Emeka Udechuku | 59.58 m |
| hammer throw | Mick Jones | 71.51 m | Paul Head | 69.63 m | John Pearson | 67.22 m |
| javelin throw | Steve Backley | 86.70 m | Nick Nieland | 85.09 m | Mick Hill | 80.28 m |
| decathlon | Alex Kruger | 6975 pts | Mark Sweeney | 6652 pts | William Wynn | 6563 pts |

=== Women ===
| Event | Gold | | Silver | | Bronze | |
|---|---|---|---|---|---|---|
| 100m | Marcia Richardson | 11.41 | Joice Maduaka | 11.47 | Sam Davies | 11.47 |
| 200m | Sarah Wilhelmy | 23.39 | Sam Davies | 23.42 | Shani Anderson | 23.53 |
| 400m | Donna Fraser | 50.94 | (Scotland) Allison Curbishley | 51.50 | Helen Frost | 53.33 |
| 800m | Kelly Holmes | 2:02.08 | Claire Raven | 2:05.12 | Jo Fenn | 2:05.48 |
| 1,500m | (Wales) Hayley Tullett | 4:06.44 | Helen Pattinson | 4:11.40 | Kelly Caffel | 4:15.29 |
| 5,000m | Paula Radcliffe | 15:05.48 | Jo Pavey | 15:21.15 | Hayley Yelling | 15:50.41 |
| 10,000m | Birhan Dagne | 32:30.4 | Sarah Wilkinson | 32:34.7 | Hayley Yelling | 32:52.5 |
| 100m hurdles | Diane Allahgreen | 13.24 | Melani Wilkins | 13.35 | Julie Pratt | 13.57 |
| 400m hurdles | Keri Maddox | 55.22 | Tasha Danvers | 55.34 | (Scotland) Sinead Dudgeon | 55.74 |
| 10,000m walk | Lisa Kehler | 45:09.57 | Nikki Huckerby | 54:53.35 | Kate Horwill | 55:59.54 |
| high jump | Jo Jennings-Steele | 1.89 m | Michelle Dunkley | 1.89 m | (Scotland) Lee McConnell | 1.86 m |
| pole vault | Janine Whitlock | 4.10 m | Irie Hill | 4.00 m | Alison Davies | 4.00 m |
| long jump | Jo Wise | 6.44 m | Jade Johnson | 6.34 m | Donita Benjamin | 6.28 m w |
| triple jump | Michelle Griffith | 13.67 m | Liz Patrick | 12.79 m | Connie Henry | 12.75 m |
| shot put | Judy Oakes | 17.91 m | Julie Dunkley | 16.40 m | Jo Duncan | 16.00 m |
| discus throw | Shelley Drew | 59.03 m | (Wales) Philippa Roles | 54.74 m | Emma Merry | 53.00 m |
| hammer throw | Lorraine Shaw | 66.85 m | Lyn Sprules | 62.48 m | Liz Pidgeon | 59.95 m |
| javelin throw | Kelly Morgan | 58.45 m | Karen Martin | 57.75 m | Shelley Holroyd | 51.96 m |
| heptathlon | Julie Hollman | 5560 pts | Kelly Sotherton | 5388 pts | Anne Hollman | 5028 pts |
