= 1996 AAA Championships =

- Dates: 14–16 June
- Host city: Birmingham, England
- Venue: Alexander Stadium
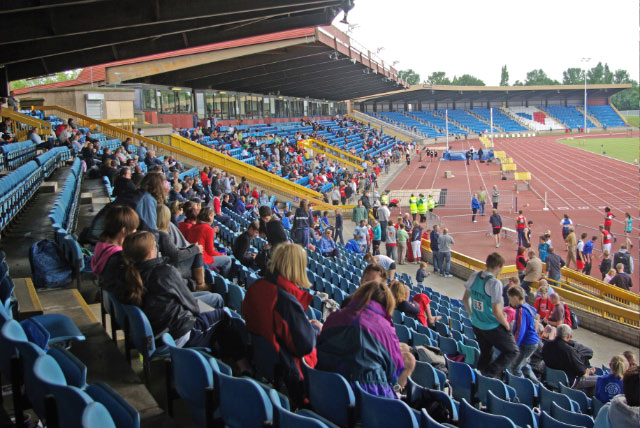
- Level: Senior
- Type: Outdoor

The 1996 AAA Championships sponsored by Securicor, was an outdoor track and field competition organised by the Amateur Athletic Association (AAA), held from 14 to 16 June at Alexander Stadium in Birmingham, England. It was considered the de facto national championships for the United Kingdom.

The competition incorporated the British Olympic trials for Great Britain at the 1996 Summer Olympics, with the top two in each (Olympic) event assured of selection, provided they had attained the qualifying standard.

== Medal summary ==
=== Men ===
Event	Gold		Silver		Bronze	
100m	Linford Christie	10.04	Darren Braithwaite	10.25	(Scotland) Ian Mackie	10.26
200m	John Regis	20.54	Linford Christie	20.54	Owusu Dako	20.72
400m	Roger Black	44.39	Du'aine Ladejo	44.66	(Wales) Iwan Thomas	44.69
800m	Curtis Robb	1:47.61	(Scotland) David Strang	1:47.74	Tony Morrell	1:47.94
1,500m	John Mayock	3:37.03	Anthony Whiteman	3:37.19	Kevin McKay	3:37.90
3,000m	Matt O'Dowd	8:30.11	Ray Plant	8:30.97	Mick Morris	8:33.15
5,000m	John Nuttall	13:48.35	Rob Denmark	13:51.72	Darius Burrows	13:54.42
10,000m	Rob Denmark	28:20.80	(Wales) Jon Brown	28:21.40	Paul Evans	28:28.31
110m hurdles	(Wales) Colin Jackson	13.13	Tony Jarrett	13.41	Andy Tulloch	13.70
400m hurdles	Jon Ridgeon	49.16	Peter Crampton	49.79	Gary Jennings	50.46
3000m steeplechase	(Wales) Justin Chaston	8:29.19	Keith Cullen	8:30.80	Spencer Duval	8:36.71
10,000m walk	(Isle of Man) Steve Partington	42:29.73	Chris Cheeseman	44:07.95	Richard Oldale	44:15.75
high jump	Steve Smith	2.31 m	Dalton Grant	2.27 m	Colin Bent	2.20 m
pole vault	Nick Buckfield	5.71 m	(Wales) Neil Winter	5.40 m	Mike Edwards	5.30 m
long jump	(Scotland) Darren Ritchie	7.86 m	Oni Onuorah	7.67 m	Stewart Faulkner	7.47 m
triple jump	Francis Agyepong	17.12 m	Femi Akinsanya	16.58 m	Julian Golley	16.39 m
shot put	Matt Simson	18.82 m	(Wales) Shaun Pickering	18.63 m	Mark Proctor	17.91 m
discus throw	Bob Weir	60.02 m	Simon Williams	57.54 m	Kevin Brown	56.76 m
hammer throw	David Smith	72.58 m	Paul Head	71.48 m	Mick Jones	71.22 m
javelin throw	Nick Nieland	83.06 m	Mick Hill	81.42 m	Colin Mackenzie	78.74 m
decathlon	Barry Thomas	7701 pts	Brian Taylor	7573 pts	Anthony Southward	7400 pts

=== Women ===
Event	Gold		Silver		Bronze	
100m	Stephi Douglas	11.55	Simmone Jacobs	11.57	Marcia Richardson	11.66
200m	Simmone Jacobs	23.11	Katharine Merry	23.30	Paula Thomas	23.46
400m	Phylis Smith	51.74	Georgina Oladapo	52.48	(Scotland) Allison Curbishley	52.76
800m	Kelly Holmes	1:57.84	Diane Modahl	1:59.87	Natalie Tait	2:02.76
1,500m	Kelly Holmes	4:08.14	Sue Parker	4:13.02	Michelle Faherty	4:14.19
3,000m	Debbie Gunning	9:26.46	Angela Davies	9:26.75	Rhona Makepeace	9:32.97
5,000m	Paula Radcliffe	15:28.46	Sonia McGeorge	15:48.33	Alison Wyeth	15:48.91
10,000m	Louise Watson	33:21.46	Angie Hulley	33:33.37	(Scotland) Vikki McPherson	33:53.17
100m hurdles	Angie Thorp	13.26	Diane Allahgreen	13.27	Denise Lewis	13.41
400m hurdles	Sally Gunnell	54.65	Alyson Layzell	56.43	Louise Fraser	56.45
5,000m walk	Vicky Lupton	23:04.57	Melanie Wright	24:36.65	Catherine Charnock	25:00.22
10,000m walk	Vicky Lupton	49:15.0	Kim Braznell	50:52.3	Liz Corran	51:17.1
high jump	Debbie Marti	1.94 m	Lea Haggett	1.92 m	Joanne Jennings	1.89 m
pole vault	Kate Staples	3.80 m	Janine Whitlock	3.70 m	Linda Stanton	3.50 m
long jump	Denise Lewis	6.55 m	Joanne Wise	6.42 m	Ashia Hansen	6.09 m
triple jump	Ashia Hansen	14.25 m	Michelle Griffith	13.78 m	Connie Henry	13.18 m
shot put	Judy Oakes	18.65 m	Myrtle Augee	16.81 m	Sharon Andrews	14.83 m
discus throw	(Northern Ireland) Jackie McKernan	54.12 m	Shelley Drew	53.68 m	Debbie Callaway	52.52 m
hammer throw	Lyn Sprules	54.16 m	Ann Gardner	51.58 m	Diana Holden	51.52 m
javelin throw	Tessa Sanderson	62.88 m	Shelley Holroyd	60.12 m	(Scotland) Lorna Jackson	58.20 m
heptathlon	Kerry Jury	5703 pts	Pauline Richards	5386 pts	Julia Bennett	5356 pts

== Other AAA titles ==
Event	Gold		Silver		Bronze	
men's marathon	(Mexico) Dionicio Cerón	2:10:00	(Belgium) Vincent Rousseau	2:10:26	Paul Evans	2:10:40
Women's marathon	(Scotland) Liz McColgan	2:27:54	(Kenya) Joyce Chepchumba	2:30:09	(Poland) Małgorzata Sobańska	2:30:17

- AAA marathon title determined by 1996 London Marathon placings.
