= List of British champions in pole vault =

The British pole vault champions covers four competitions; the current British Athletics Championships which was founded in 2007, the preceding AAA Championships (1880-2006), the Amateur Athletic Club Championships (1866-1879) and finally the UK Athletics Championships which existed from 1977 until 1997 and ran concurrently with the AAA Championships.

Where an international athlete won the AAA Championships the highest ranking UK athlete is considered the National Champion in this list.

== Past winners ==
AAC Championships Pole jump, men's event only
Year	Men's champion
1866	J. Wheeler
1867	William Powell Moore
1868	Robert Mitchell
1869	Robert Graham
1870	Robert Mitchell
1871	Robert Mitchell
1872	Henry Fellowes
1873	William Kelsey
1874	Edwin Woodburn
1875	not held
1876	Horace Strachan
1877	Henry Kayll
1878	Horace Strachan
1879	Frederick Robinson

AAA Championships pole vault, men's event only
Year	Men's champion
1880	Edward Strachan
1881	Tom Ray
1882	Tom Ray
1883	H. J. Cobbold
1884	Tom Ray
1885	Tom Ray
1886	Tom Ray
1887	Tom Ray
1888	Lat Stones & Tom Ray
1889	Lat Stones
1890	Richard Dickinson
1891	R. Watson
1892	Richard Dickinson & R. Watson
1893	Richard Dickinson
1894	Richard Dickinson
1895	Richard Dickinson
1896	R. E. Forshaw
1897	James Poole
1898	James Poole
1899	E. C. Pritchard
1900	NBA
1901	W. H. Hodgson
1902	W. H. Hodgson
1903	NBA
1904	Herbert Dickinson
1905	NBA
1906	NBA
1907	R. Parrington
1908	Alf Flaxman
1909	Alf Flaxman
1910	Joseph Young
1911	NBA
1912	Owen Conquest
1913	NBA
1914	A. Anderson
1919	NBA
1920	Joe Birkett
1921	NBA
1922	NBA
1923	NBA
1924	James Campbell
1925	Fred Housden
1926	James Campbell
1927	NBA
1928	Fred Housden
1929	Howard Ford
1930	Bernard Babbington-Smith
1931	Laurence Bond
1932	Patrick Ogilvie
1933	Ian Barratt, Laurence Bond & Frank Phillipson
1934	Frank Phillipson
1935	Alfred Kinally
1936	Richard Webster
1937	John Dodd
1938	Richard Webster
1939	Richard Webster
1946	John Dodd
1947	NBA
1948	Richard Webster
1949	Tim Anderson
1950	Tim Anderson & Norman Gregor
1951	Norman Gregor
1952	Geoff Elliott
1953	Geoff Elliott
1954	Geoff Elliott
1955	Geoff Elliott
1956	Ian Ward
1957	Ian Ward
1958	Geoff Elliott
1959	Rex Porter
1960	Rex Porter
1961	Rex Porter
1962	Trevor Burton
1963	Rex Porter
1964	Trevor Burton
1965	Trevor Burton
1966	Mike Bull
1967	Mike Bull
1968	Mike Bull
1969	Mike Bull
1970	Mike Bull
1971	Mike Bull
1972	Mike Bull
1973	Brian Hooper
1974	Brian Hooper
1975	Jeff Gutteridge
1976	Brian Hooper

AAA Championships & UK Athletics Championships dual championships era 1977-1987
Year	AAA Men	Year	UK Men
1977	Brian Hooper	1977	Jeff Gutteridge
1978	Brian Hooper	1978	Keith Stock
1979	Jeff Gutteridge & Keith Stock	1979	Brian Hooper
1980	Brian Hooper	1980	Keith Stock
1981	Keith Stock	1981	Graham Eggleton
1982	Jeff Gutteridge	1982	Graham Eggleton
1983	Jeff Gutteridge	1983	Keith Stock
1984	Jeff Gutteridge	1984	Keith Stock
1985	Keith Stock	1985	Andy Ashurst
1986	Brian Hooper	1986	Andy Ashurst
1987	Jeff Gutteridge	1987	Jeff Gutteridge
1988	Mike Edwards	1988	Andy Ashurst
1989	Mike Edwards	1989	Mike Edwards
1990	Mike Edwards	1990	Andy Ashurst
1991	Mike Edwards	1991	Andy Ashurst
1992	Ian Tullett	1992	Mike Edwards

AAA Championships & UK Athletics Championships dual championships era 1988-1997
Year	Men AAA	Women AAA	Year	Men UK	Women UK
1993	Ian Tullett	Kate Staples	1993	Neil Winter	Kate Staples
1994	Andy Ashurst	Kate Staples	n/a		
1995	Nick Buckfield	Kate Staples	n/a		
1996	Nick Buckfield	Kate Staples	n/a		
1997	Tim Thomas	Janine Whitlock	1997	Paul Williamson	Janine Whitlock

AAA Championships second era 1998-2006
Year	Men's champion	Women's champion
1998	Kevin Hughes	Janine Whitlock
1999	Kevin Hughes	Janine Whitlock
2000	Kevin Hughes	Janine Whitlock
2001	Paul Williamson	Janine Whitlock
2002	Nick Buckfield	Irie Hill
2003	Nick Buckfield	Tracey Bloomfield
2004	Tim Thomas	Zoe Brown
2005	Nick Buckfield	Janine Whitlock
2006	Steven Lewis	Ellie Spain

British Athletics Championships 2007 to present
Year	Men's champion	Women's champion
2007	Steven Lewis	Kate Dennison
2008	Steven Lewis	Emma Lyons
2009	Luke Cutts	Kate Dennison
2010	Joe Ive	Kate Dennison^{(3)}
2011	Steven Lewis	Holly Bleasdale
2012	Steven Lewis	Holly Bleasdale
2013	Luke Cutts	Sally Peake
2014	Steven Lewis	Sally Peake
2015	Steven Lewis^{(7)}	Holly Bradshaw
2016	Luke Cutts	Holly Bradshaw
2017	Luke Cutts^{(4)}	Holly Bradshaw
2018	Charlie Myers	Holly Bradshaw
2019	Harry Coppell	Holly Bradshaw
2020	Harry Coppell	Holly Bradshaw
2021	Harry Coppell	Holly Bradshaw
2022	Harry Coppell	Holly Bradshaw^{(10)}
2023	Charlie Myers^{(2)}	Molly Caudery
2024	Harry Coppell^{(5)}	Molly Caudery
2025	Owen Heard	Molly Caudery^{(3)}
2026	Owen Heard ^{(2)}	Gemma Tutton

- NBA = No British athlete in medal placings
- nc = not contested
