= 1992 AAA Championships =

- Dates: 27–28 July
- Host city: Birmingham, England
- Venue: Alexander Stadium
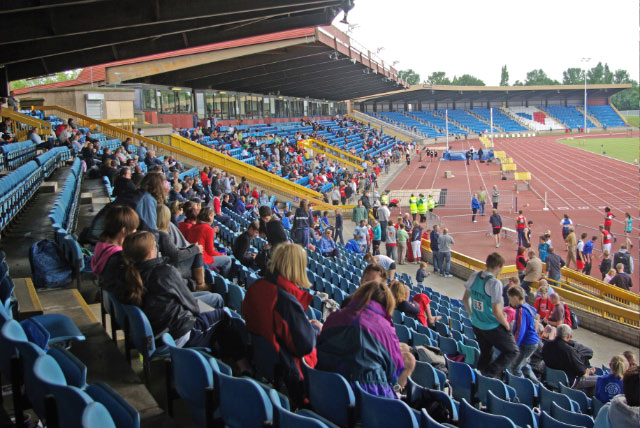
- Level: Senior
- Type: Outdoor

The 1992 AAA Championships was an outdoor track and field competition organised by the Amateur Athletic Association (AAA), held from 27 to 28 July at Alexander Stadium in Birmingham, England. It served as the British trials event for the 1992 Summer Olympics and was considered the de facto national championships for the United Kingdom, ahead of the 1992 UK Athletics Championships.

== Medal summary ==
=== Men ===
Event	Gold		Silver		Bronze	
100m	Linford Christie	10.09	Jason Livingston	10.30	Marcus Adam	10.36
200m	John Regis	20.27	Linford Christie	20.29	Roger Black	20.65
400m	(Trinidad and Tobago) Alvin Daniel	44.84	Derek Redmond	45.14	David Grindley	45.41
800m	Curtis Robb	1:45.16	Steve Heard	1:45.23	(Scotland) Tom McKean	1:45.29
1,500m	Kevin McKay	3:37.51	(Scotland) Tom Hanlon	3:38.08	Robert Denmark	3:38.34
3,000m	(Republic of Ireland) Frank O'Mara	7:59.97	Mike Quinn	8:03.85	Alan Johnson	8:04.02
5,000m	Jack Buckner	13:22.50	(India) Bahadur Prasad	13:29.70	John Mayock	13:31.77
10,000m	Eamonn Martin	28:02.56	Richard Nerurkar	28:07.44	Paul Evans	28:13.71
110m hurdles	(Wales) Colin Jackson	13.15	Tony Jarrett	13.23	Hughie Teape	13.51
400m hurdles	Kriss Akabusi	49.16	(Australia) Simon Hollingsworth	50.26	Max Robertson	50.46
3000m steeplechase	Colin Walker	8:25.15	Tom Buckner	8:26.29	Keith Cullen	8:31.72
10,000m walk	Martin Rush	41:46.42	(Scotland) Martin Bell	42:07.42	Andrew Penn	42:21.70
high jump	Steve Smith	2.31 m	(Australia) Tim Forsyth	2.31 m	(Australia) David Anderson	2.28 m
pole vault	Ian Tullett	5.30 m	Mike Edwards	5.30 m	Warren Siley	5.20 m
long jump	(Australia) Dave Culbert	7.85 m	(Sierra Leone) Tom Ganda	7.73 m	Mark Forsythe	7.66 m
triple jump	Julian Golley	16.81 m	Francis Agyepong	16.42 m	John Herbert	16.40 m
shot put	(Wales) Paul Edwards	19.08 m	Simon Williams	18.12 m	Matt Simson	18.00 m
discus throw	(Australia) Werner Reiterer	61.78 m	Abi Ekoku	58.02 m	Simon Williams	56.64 m
hammer throw	(Australia) Sean Carlin	74.60 m	Paul Head	70.94 m	Jason Byrne	70.78 m
javelin throw	Steve Backley	88.14 m	Mick Hill	85.32 m	Nigel Bevan	81.70 m
decathlon	Alex Kruger	7582 pts	Jim Stevenson	7093 pts	(Scotland) Jamie Quarry	6934 pts

=== Women ===
Event	Gold		Silver		Bronze	
100m	(Australia) Melinda Gainsford	11.38	(Australia) Kerry Johnson	11.43	Stephi Douglas	11.45
200m	(Australia) Melinda Gainsford	23.04	(Australia) Melissa Moore	23.22	(Wales) Sallyanne Short	23.24
400m	(Australia) Cathy Freeman	51.14	(Australia) Michelle Lock	51.19	Phylis Smith	51.36
800m	Diane Edwards	2:00.41	Paula Fryer	2:01.07	(Republic of Ireland) Aisling Molloy	2:01.49
1,500m	(Scotland) Yvonne Murray	4:05.87	(Wales) Kirsty Wade	4:06.07	(Scotland) Liz McColgan	4:07.68
3,000m	Lisa York	8:50.18	(Australia) Krishna Stanton	8:51.39	Alison Wyeth	8:57.16
5,000m	Amanda Wright	16:04.51	Gillian Stacey	16:09.36	Elaine Foster	16:09.83
10,000m	Andrea Wallace	32:21.61	Sue Crehan	33:05.14	Suzanne Rigg	33:16.03
100m hurdles	Sally Gunnell	13.13	(Wales) Kay Morley-Brown	13.28	Lesley-Ann Skeete	13.38
400m hurdles	Gowry Retchakan	55.04	(Australia) Gail Luke	56.25	Louise Fraser	56.30
5,000m walk	Vicky Lupton	22:12.21	(Scotland) Verity Larby	23:41.17	Sylvia Black	23:50.54
high jump	Lea Haggett	1.89 m	(Australia) Alison Inverarity	1.89 m	Debbie Marti	1.89 m
long jump	Fiona May	6.70 m	Joanne Wise	6.47 m	Yinka Idowu	6.42 m
triple jump	Rachel Kirby	13.09 m	Connie Henry	12.72 m	(Scotland) Karen Hambrook	12.41 m
shot put	Myrtle Augee	17.29 m	Yvonne Hanson-Nortey	16.14 m	Maggie Lynes	15.21 m
discus throw	Jackie McKernan	54.48 m	Sharon Andrews	53.36 m	Tracy Axten	52.30 m
javelin throw	Tessa Sanderson	63.26 m	(Australia) Sue Howland	59.78 m	(Australia) Louise McPaul	57.84 m
heptathlon	Clova Court	5846 pts	Denise Lewis	5685 pts	Emma Beales	5430 pts

== Other AAA titles ==
Event	Gold		Silver		Bronze	
men's marathon	(Portugal) António Pinto	2:10:02	(Poland) Jan Huruk	2:10:07	(Tanzania) Thomas Naali	2:10:08
Women's marathon	(Germany) Katrin Dörre	2:29:39	(Poland) Renata Kokowska	2:29:59	Andrea Wallace	2:31:33

- + AAA marathon determined by 1992 London Marathon placings
