= Athletics at the 1930 British Empire Games – Men's pole vault =

Men's pole vault at the Commonwealth Games

The men's pole vault event at the 1930 British Empire Games was held on 23 August at the Civic Stadium in Hamilton, Canada.

== Results ==
Rank	Name	Nationality	Result	Notes
1st place, gold medalist(s)	Victor Pickard	Canada	12 ft 3 in (3.73 m)	
2nd place, silver medalist(s)	Howard Ford	England	12 ft 3 in (3.73 m)	
3rd place, bronze medalist(s)	Robert Stoddard	Canada	12 ft 0 in (3.66 m)	
4	Alf Gilbert	Canada	?.??	
5	Laurence Bond	England	?.??	
6	Bernard Babington Smith	England	?.??	
7	Francis Foley	England	?.??	
