= Housden =

Housden is a surname. Notable people with the surname include:

- Dennis Housden (born 1953), English footballer
- Fred Housden (1892–1974), English athletics coach
- Jak Housden (born 1969), Australian musician
- James Housden (1904–1994), Australian Anglican bishop
- Stephen Housden (born 1950) English/Australian musician
- Leslie Housden (1894–1963), English medical doctor and long-distance runner
- Martyn Housden, British historian
- Peter Housden (born 1950), British government officer

Notable people with the middle name include:

- Philip Ernest Housden Pike (1914-2011), Jamaican barrister
