= Tim Anderson (athlete) =

British pole vaulter (1925–2017)

Personal information
- Nationality: British (English)
- Born: 16 October 1925 Croydon, London
- Died: 22 September 2017 (aged 91)

Sport
- Sport: Athletics
- Event: pole vault
- University team: Cambridge University AC
- Club: Achilles Club
Medal record
Athletics
Representing England
British Empire Games
| Gold medal – first place | 1950 Auckland | Pole Vault |

Timothy Donald Anderson (16 October 1925 – 22 September 2017) was a British pole vaulter who competed in the 1952 Summer Olympics.

== Biography ==
Anderson was educated at Malvern College and Clare College, Cambridge. He twice won the Southern Athletics Championship and the Universities' Athletic Union (UAU) Championships in 1948 and 1949.

Anderson finished third behind Richard Webster in the pole vault event at the 1948 AAA Championships and third behind Peter Harwood in the pole vault event at the 1949 AAA Championships.

Anderson represented the England athletics team at the 1950 British Empire Games in Auckland, New Zealand, winning the gold medal in the pole vault competition.

Several months later, by virtue of being the highest placed British athlete behind Rudy Stjernild at the 1950 AAA Championships, he was considered to be the British pole vault champion.

Another second place ensued at the 1952 AAA Championships, this time behind Geoff Elliott. Shortly afterwards he represented the Great Britain team at the 1952 Olympic Games in Helsinki.
