= Owusu Dako =

British sprinter

Personal information
- Nationality: British/Ghanaian
- Born: 23 May 1973 (age 53) Accra, Ghana
- Height: 194 cm (6 ft 4 in)
- Weight: 85 kg (187 lb)

Sport
- Sport: Athletics
- Event: Sprinting
- Club: Sale Harriers

Owusu Dako (born 23 May 1973) is a former sprinter who competed in the men's 200 metres at the 1996 Summer Olympics.

== Biography ==
Born in Ghana, Dako was twice on the podium at the British Championships, finishing third behind John Regis and Linford Christie at the 1996 AAA Championships and second behind Dougie Walker at the 1997 British Athletics Championships.
