= Andrea Coore =

English long jumper

Personal information
- Nationality: British (English)
- Born: 23 April 1969 (age 56) London, England

Sport
- Sport: Athletics
- Event: long jump
- Club: Essex Ladies AC

Andrea Anne Coore (born 1969), is a female former athlete who competed for England.

== Biography ==
Coore became the British long jump champion after winning the British AAA Championships title at the 1997 AAA Championships. The following year she finished third behind Denise Lewis.

Coore represented England in the long jump event, at the 1998 Commonwealth Games in Kuala Lumpur, Malaysia.
