= Rex Porter =

British athlete

Personal information
- Nationality: British (English)
- Born: 29 September 1931 Gloucestershire, England
- Died: 2003 (aged 71) Gloucestershire, England

Sport
- Sport: Athletics
- Event: pole vault
- Club: Birchfield Harriers

Stephen Rex Porter (29 September 1931 – 2003) was a male athlete who competed for England.

== Biography ==
Porter finished third behind Ian Ward in the pole vault event at the 1957 AAA Championships.

He represented the England athletics team in the pole vault at the 1958 British Empire and Commonwealth Games in Cardiff, Wales.

Porter became the British pole vault champion after winning the British AAA Championships title at the 1960 AAA Championships. Two years later he competed in the pole vault again at the 1962 British Empire and Commonwealth Games in Perth, Australia.

Porter was a school teacher by trade and worked at various schools including Brewood Grammar School and Cheltenham Grammar School. He was also a rugby player and represented Cheltenham and Gloucestershire.
