= Angie Thorp =

British athlete (born 1972)

Personal information
- Nationality: British (English)
- Born: 7 December 1972 (age 53) Wombwell, England
- Height: 170 cm (5 ft 7 in)
- Weight: 65 kg (143 lb)

Sport
- Sport: Athletics
- Event(s): 100 metres Hurdles, 4 × 100 metres relay
- Club: Wigan Harriers

Angela Caroline Thorp (born 7 December 1972) is a female British 100 metres hurdler and sprinter who competed at the 1996 Summer Olympics.

== Biography ==
Thorp became the British 100 metres hurdles champion after winning the British AAA Championships title at the 1996 AAA Championships.

At the 1996 Olympic Games in Atlanta, Thorp represented Great Britain in the 100 metres hurdles and women's 4 × 100 metres relay events. She broke the British 100 metres hurdles record of 1992 Olympic Champion Sally Gunnell at the games, running a personal best time of 12.80 seconds in the semi-final finishing 5th. She therefore did not make one of the top four qualifiers for the final. However, the 3rd placed athlete in this semi-final, Nataliya Shekhodanova of Russia, was subsequently disqualified after the final for doping offences which meant that also after the final Thorp was retrospectively upgraded to 4th place in the semi-final. At the games she was also a part of the British team which finished 8th in the 4 x 100 metres relay final.

In 1997, Thorp won both the AAA title at the 1997 AAA Championships and the 1997 British Athletics Championships.

Thorp represented England in the 100 metres hurdles event, at the 1998 Commonwealth Games in Kuala Lumpur, Malaysia.

Thorp's British record stood for 15 years until it was broken in 2011 by Tiffany Porter. Thorp said that she was "devastated" at losing her record to an American-born athlete. She said that she would have congratulated an established British athlete who took her record; at the time Jessica Ennis and Sarah Claxton both had personal bests of 12.81s. Ennis later took the British record at the London 2012 Olympic Games.
