= Henry Kayll =

England international rugby union player

- Full name: Henry Edward Kayll
- Born: 16 July 1855 Sunderland, England
- Died: 14 February 1910 (aged 54) Vancouver, Canada

Rugby union career
- Position: Fullback
International career
| Years | Team | Apps | (Points) |
| 1878 | England | 1 | (0) |

Henry Edward Kayll (16 July 1855 – 14 February 1910) was an English international rugby union player.

Kayll was the son of former Sunderland mayor John James Kayll.

An all–round sportsman, Kayll was a British pole vault champion and as a rugby fullback earned representative honours for England in 1878, featuring in a drawn match against Scotland at The Oval.

Kayll immigrated to Canada soon after attaining his England cap.

== See also ==
- List of England national rugby union players
