= Alex Kruger =

British decathlete (born 1963)

Personal information
- Nationality: British (English)
- Born: 18 November 1963 (age 63) Öhringen, Baden-Württemberg, West Germany
- Height: 193 cm (6 ft 4 in)
- Weight: 90 kg (198 lb)

Sport
- Sport: Athletics
- Event: Decathlon / High jump
- Club: Liverpool Pembroke; Border Harriers, Carlisle

Alexander Eaton Kruger (born 18 November 1963) is a male retired decathlete from England who competed at the 1988 Summer Olympics and the 1992 Summer Olympics.

== Biography ==
Kruger, born in West Germany, was a competent high jumper and won the 1984 UK Athletics Championships before switching to utilise his all-round ability to compete in decathlon. He twice finished runner-up at the 1987 AAA Championships and the 1988 AAA Championships. Shortly afterwards he represented Great Britain at the 1988 Olympic Games in Seoul.

Kruger became the British decathlon champion after winning the British AAA Championships title at the 1989 AAA Championships held in Stoke-on-Trent and the following year represented England placing fourth at the 1990 Commonwealth Games in Auckland, New Zealand

Kruger regained the AAA title at the 1992 AAA Championships before representing Great Britain at the 1992 Olympic Games in Barcelona. He represented England at the 1994 Commonwealth Games in Victoria, Canada.

Kruger set his personal best (8,131 points) in the men's decathlon in 1995 before winning a third AAA title at the 2000 AAA Championships.

== Achievements ==
Year	Tournament	Venue	Result	Extra
1988	Olympic Games	Seoul, South Korea	24th	
1990	Commonwealth Games	Auckland, New Zealand	4th	
	European Championships	Split, Yugoslavia	20th	
1993	World Championships	Stuttgart, Germany	19th	
1994	Hypo-Meeting	Götzis, Austria	7th	Decathlon
1994	Commonwealth Games	Victoria, Canada	7th	
1995	World Indoor Championships	Barcelona, Spain	5th	
1995	Hypo-Meeting	Götzis, Austria	9th	Decathlon
1995	World Championships	Gothenburg, Sweden	12th	
1996	Olympic Games	Atlanta, Georgia, United States	DNF	
