= Jeff Gutteridge =

English pole vaulter (born 1956)

Personal information
- Nationality: British (English)
- Born: 28 October 1956 (age 69) Slough, England
- Height: 1.83 m (6 ft 0 in)
- Weight: 76 kg (168 lb)

Sport
- Sport: Athletics
- Event: Pole vault
- Club: Windsor, Slough & Eton AC
Medal record
Representing England
Commonwealth Games
Silver medal – second place	1982 Brisbane	Pole vault

Jeffrey Gutteridge (born 28 October 1956) is an English former pole vaulter who represented Great Britain at two Summer Olympics. He was the national pole vault champion on several occasions.

== Biography ==
Gutteridge, who is from Slough, competed in the qualifying rounds of the 1976 Summer Olympics, the youngest athlete in the field at 19-years of age.

He represented England in the pole vault event, at the 1978 Commonwealth Games in Edmonton, Canada. Four years later he represented England and won a silver medal at the 1982 Commonwealth Games in Brisbane, Australia, behind Ray Boyd.

At the 1984 Summer Olympics he qualified for the final after registering a 5.30m jump in the preliminary rounds. In the final he successfully cleared 5.10m and finished in 11th position.

Gutteridge was a four-times British pole vault champion after winning the British AAA Championships title at the 1983 AAA Championships, 1984 AAA Championships and 1987 AAA Championships and by virtue of being the highest placed British athlete (with Keith Stock) in 1979.

In 1988 he tested positive, while training, for anabolic steroids. He was given a life ban, which was later reduced.
