= Achilles Club =

British track and field club

- Founded: 1920
- Ground: Various; Iffley Road, Oxford; Wilberforce Road, Cambridge
- Location: Oxford; Cambridge
- Website: official website

The Achilles Club is a track and field club for the past and present representatives of the Oxford and Cambridge Universities. As of 2025, members have won 19 Olympic gold medals and held 38 World Records.

== Membership ==
Athletes that have competed in the annual varsity match are invited to join the club, in addition to Blues, Half Blues, Cross Country, Marathon, Relay and Field Event Colours, members from Alverstone, Centipedes, Alligators and Millipedes representatives (the varsity second teams), and recommendations by the University Presidents.

== History ==
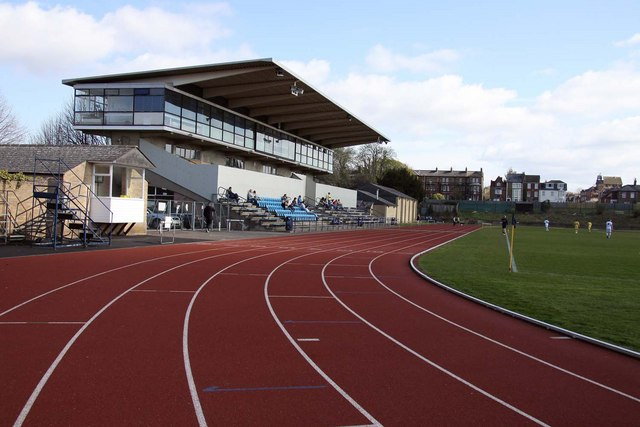
Oxford's Iffley Road track

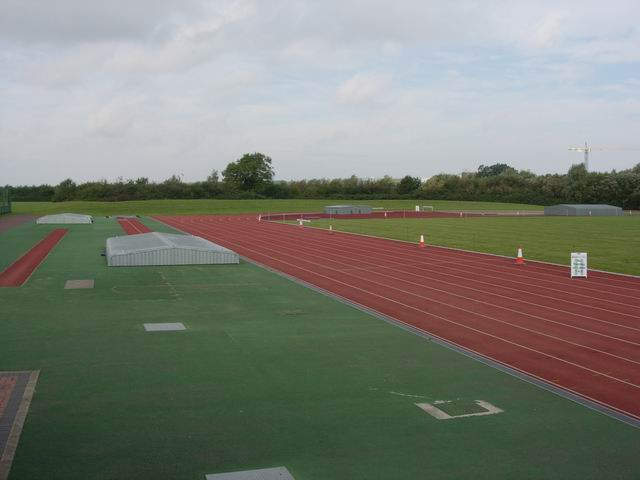
The Cambridge athletics track

The club was formed in 1920. One of its founding members was Evelyn Montague, who, along with Harold Abrahams, is portrayed in the 1981 film Chariots of Fire.

== Olympians ==
- Athletics Olympians only and English unless stated

Athlete	Events	Games	Medals/Ref
Charles Gmelin (O)	400	1896	
George Robertson (O)	discus throw, shot put	1896	
(United States) Wesley Coe (O)	shot put	1904, 1908	Silver medal
Eric Hussey (O)	110h	1908	
Edward Leader (C)	110h, high jump	1908	
Norman Hallows (O)	1500, 3 mile team	1908	Bronze medal
Christopher Chavasse (O)	400	1908	
Edward Ryle (C)	400	1908	
Theodore Just (C)	800, medley relay	1908	
Harold Holding (O)	800	1908	
Walter Henderson (O)	discus, Greek, javelin, slj, shj	1908, 1912	
Ernest May (O)	discus, Greek, javelin	1908	
Alfred Bellerby (C)	high jump, long jump	1908	
Alan Fyffe (O)	hammer	1908	
(Scotland) Robert Lindsay-Watson (C)	hammer	1908	
Charles Williams (C)	long jump	1908	
Wilfred Bleaden (O)	long jump, slj	1908	
Lionel Cornish (O)	long jump, slj	1908	
Arthur Anderson (C)	100, 200	1912	
Arnold Jackson (O)	1500	1912	Gold medal
Philip Noel-Baker (C)	800, 1500	1912	Silver medal
(United States) Norman Taber (O)	1500, 3000 team	1912	Gold medal
William Moore (O)	1500, 3000 team	1912	
Duncan Macmillan (C)	200	1912	
Cyril Porter (O)	3000 team, 5000	1912	
Sidney Abrahams (C)	long jump	1912	
(South Africa) Bevil Rudd (O)	400, 4x400, 800	1920	Silver medal Silver medal Bronze medal
Harold Abrahams (C)	100, 200, 4x100, long jump	1920, 1924	Gold medal Silver medal
William Seagrove (C)	3000 team, 5000	1920, 1924	Silver medal
John Ainsworth-Davis (C)	400, 4x400	1920	Gold medal
Guy Butler (C)	4x400, 400	1920, 1924, 1928	Gold medal Silver medal Bronze medal Bronze medal
(Australia) Wilfrid Kent Hughes (O)	400h	1920	Gold medal
Edgar Mountain (C)	800	1920, 1924	
(New Zealand) Arthur Porritt (O)	100, 200	1924	Bronze medal
Lord Burghley (C)	110h, 400h, 4x400	1924, 1928, 1932	Gold medal Silver medal
Leopold Partridge (C)	110h	1924	
Hyla Stallard (C)	800, 1500	1924	Bronze medal
Douglas Lowe (C)	4x400, 800, 1500	1924, 1928	Gold medal Gold medal
(United States) Bayes Norton (O)	200	1924	
(United States) William Stevenson (O)	4x400	1924	Gold medal
George Renwick (O)	4x400	1924	Bronze medal
(Canada) David Johnson (O)	400, 4x400	1924	
Wilfrid Tatham (C)	400h, 800	1924, 1928	
Ralph Starr (C)	800, 5000	1924, 1928	
(South Africa) Clifford Davis (C)	800	1924	
(South Africa) Lawrence Roberts (C)	high jump	1924	
Robert Dickinson (O)	high jump	1924	
Arthur Willis (C)	high jump	1924	
Malcolm Nokes (O)	hammer	1924, 1928	Bronze medal
Chris Mackintosh (O)	long jump	1924	
James Campbell (C)	pole vault	1924	
Rex Woods (C)	shot put	1924, 1928	
(South Africa) George Weightman-Smith (C)	110h	1928	
(New Zealand) Wilfrid Kalaugher (O)	110h, triple jump	1928	
Vernon Morgan (O)	3000 steeplechase	1928	
Edward Smouha (C)	4x100	1928	Bronze medal
John Rinkel (C)	400m, 4x400	1928	
Roger Leigh-Wood (O)	400m, 4x400	1928	
Tom Livingstone-Learmonth (C)	400h	1928	
Lance Percival (O)	400h	1928	
Colin Gordon (O)	high jump	1928	
Howard Ford (C)	Decathlon	1928	
Carl van Geyzel (C)	high jump	1928	
James Cohen (C)	long jump	1928	
Reg Revans (C)	long jump	1928	
Laurence Bond (C)	pole vault	1928	
Robert Howland (C)	shot put	1928	
Roland Harper (O)	110h	1932	
Jerry Cornes (O)	1500	1932, 1936	Silver medal
(United States) Norwood Hallowell (O)	1500	1932	
(New Zealand) Jack Lovelock (O)	1500	1932, 1936	Gold medal
Tommy Hampson (C)	800, 4x400	1932	Gold medal Silver medal
(Republic of Ireland) Bob Tisdall (C)	400h, decathlon	1932	Gold medal
Alan Pennington (O)	100, 200, 4x100	1936	
John Thornton (C)	110h	1936	
Ashleigh Pilbrow (O)	110h	1936	
(Socialist Federal Republic of Yugoslavia) Vane Ivanović (C)	110h	1936	
Gordon Brown (C)	400m, 4x400	1936	Gold medal Silver medal
Peter Ward (C)	5000	1936, 1948	
(Czechoslovakia) Josef Klein (C)	Decathlon	1936	
(Norway) Helge Sivertsen (O)	discus	1936	
Robert Kennedy (C)	high jump	1936	
Richard Webster (C)	pole vault	1936, 1948	
(India) Eric Prabhakar (O)	100, 200	1948	
Raymond Barkway (O)	110h	1948	
John Fairgrieve (C)	200	1948	
Geoffrey Tudor (O)	3000 steeplechase	1948	
Peter Curry (O)	3000 steeplechase	1948	
Morville Chote (C)	javelin	1948	
Harry Askew (C)	long jump	1948	
Peter Hildreth (C)	110h	1952, 1956, 1960	
Roger Bannister (O)	1500	1952	
Nicolas Stacey (O)	200, 4x400	1952	
Chris Brasher (C)	3000 steeplechase	1952, 1956	Gold medal
Alan Dick (O)	4x400	1952	
Angus Scott (C)	400h	1952	
Christopher Chataway (O)	5000	1952, 1956	
Tim Anderson (C)	pole vault	1952	
Ian Boyd (O)	1500	1956	
Derek Johnson (O)	4x400, 800	1956	Bronze medal Silver medal
Bob Shaw (O)	400h	1956	
Tom Farrell (C)	400h, 800	1956, 1960	
Barclay Palmer (O)	shot put	1956	
(Australia) Herb Elliott (C)	1500	1960	Gold medal
Michael Palmer (C)	3000 steeplechase	1960	
John Metcalf (O)	400h	1960	
Bruce Tulloh (C)	5000	1960	
(India) Ranjit Bhatia (O)	5000	1960	
(New Zealand) Donal Smith (O)	800	1960	
Mike Parker (C)	110h	1964, 1968	
Adrian Metcalfe (O)	400, 4x400	1964	Silver medal
(Trinidad and Tobago) Wendell Mottley (C)	400, 4x400	1964	Silver medal Bronze medal
Mike Hogan (O)	400h	1964	
John Boulter (O)	800, 1500	1964, 1968	
Michael Ralph (O)	triple jump	1964	
(Trinidad and Tobago) Euric Bobb (C)	4x400	1968	
Martin Winbolt-Lewis (C)	400, 4x400	1968	
David Hemery (O)	400h, 4x400	1968, 1972	Gold medal Silver medal Bronze medal
Tim Johnston (C)	Marathon	1968	
Jon Ridgeon (C)	110h, 400h	1988, 1996	
Richard Nerurkar (O)	10000, marathon	1992, 1996	
(Canada) Tim Berrett (O)	20k walk, 50k walk	1992, 1996, 2000, 2004, 2008	
Andy Baddeley (C)	1500	2008, 2012	
Mara Yamauchi (O)	marathon	2008, 2012	
Hatti Dean (O)	3000M steeplechase injured	2008	
Julia Bleasdale (C)	5000m, 10,000m	2012	
Claire Hallissey (C)	marathon	2012	
Louise Shanahan (C)	800m	2020	

(key: O=Oxford C=Cambridge slj=standing long jump, shj=standing high jump)
