= Sharon Foley =

Irish former track and field athlete

Sharon Gallen née Foley
Personal information
- Nationality: Irish
- Born: 20 May 1972 (age 53) Lifford, County Donegal, Ireland

Sport
- Sport: Athletics
- Event: high jump
- Club: Lifford A.C.

Sharon Gallen (/ˈɡælən/ GAL-ən; née Foley; born 20 May 1972) is an Irish former track and field athlete who specialised in the high jump. She also competed in the triple jump, pentathlon and heptathlon. A winner of 22 Irish national titles, she competed in the high jump at the 1993 World Championships.

== Career ==
Born in Lifford, County Donegal, Foley was a member of Lifford A.C.. In the high jump, she was outdoor national champion in 1989, 1990, 1993, 1995, 1997 and 2001. She was also indoor champion in 1990, 1993, 1996, 1997, 1998 and 2003. Foley was national Pentathlon champion from 1993 to 1995. In 2001, she won both the high jump and triple jump events at the Norwich Union British Grand Prix at Crystal Palace.

Foley finished second behind Debbie Marti in the high jump event at the 1993 AAA Championships.

Foley holds the Women's Senior Irish National Record for the Heptathlon with 5394 points, achieved in Hemel Hempstead on 23 and 24 August 1997. Her personal best (and second in the Irish all-time records) in the high jump is 1.88m. set in Rotterdam, Netherlands on 13 June 1993. Foley also holds second in the Irish all-time records for the triple Jump with a distance of 12.49 set in Lappeenranta, Finland on 21 June 2003. Her biggest achievement was her representation for Ireland at the 1993 World Championships in Stuttgart where she competed in the high jump.

Foley is now retired and married to Martin Gallen, with two children.

== International competitions ==
Year	Competition	Venue	Position	Event	Notes
1989	European Junior Championships	Varaždin, Yugoslavia	15th (q)	high jump	1.65 m
1990	European Indoor Championships	Glasgow, United Kingdom	17th	high jump	1.75 m
1993	World Championships	Stuttgart, Germany	34th (q)	high jump	1.75 m
(q) Indicates overall position in qualifying round

== National titles ==
=== Irish Championships ===
- High jump outdoors (1989, 1990, 1992, 1995, 1997, 2001)
- High jump indoors (1990, 1993, 1996, 1997, 1998, 2003)
- Heptathlon outdoors (1999, 2001, 2002, 2003)
- Pentathlon indoors (1993, 1994, 1995)
- Triple jump outdoors (2001)
- Triple jump indoors (2002, 2003)

=== Scottish Championships ===
- High jump outdoors (1997)
- High jump indoors (1998)
- Triple jump outdoors (2001)
- Pentathlon indoors (2003)
