= Jason Livingston =

British sprinter (born 1971)

Personal information
- Nationality: British (English)
- Born: 17 March 1971 (age 55) Croydon, London, England

Sport
- Sport: Athletics
- Event: Sprints
- Club: Croydon Harriers; Shaftesbury Barnet Harriers
Medal record
Men's athletics
Representing Great Britain
European Athletics Indoor Championships
| Gold medal – first place | 1992 Genoa | 60 m |

Jason Livingston (born 17 March 1971) is a former sprinter from England.

== Biography ==
Livingston won the 60 metres sprint gold medal at the 1992 European Athletics Indoor Championships in Genoa, in a time of 6.53 seconds. He also represented Britain in the 100 metres at the 1991 World Championships in Tokyo, where he finished 5th in his heat in a time of 10.57 seconds.

In 1992, Livingston was selected to be part of the British team for the Olympic Games in Barcelona, but was sent home before the games began after failing a drugs test. After initially protesting his innocence, he later admitted taking a banned steroid but insisted he had done so inadvertently.

He returned to the sport in 1997 after serving a four-year ban. In 1999, he set a personal best time of 21.39 seconds over 200 metres (indoors).

Livingston twice finished second behind in the 100 metres event at the 1992 AAA Championships and 1997 AAA Championships.

== Personal bests ==
- 60 m - 6.51 seconds (indoor), Glasgow, 8 February 1992
- 100 m - 10.09 seconds (outdoor), London, 13 June 1992
- 200 m - 21.39 seconds (indoor), Birmingham, 17 January 1999
