= Ian Tullett =

English pole vaulter

Personal information
- Nationality: British (English)
- Born: 15 August 1969 (age 57) Greater London, England

Sport
- Sport: Athletics
- Event: Pole vault
- Club: Belgrave Harriers
Medal record
Commonwealth Games
Silver medal – second place	1990 Auckland	Pole vault

Ian Roger Tullett (born 15 August 1969) is an English former pole vaulter.

== Biography ==
Tullett represented England and won a silver medal at the 1990 Commonwealth Games in Auckland, New Zealand, behind Australia's Simon Arkell. Eight years later he represented England in the pole vault event, at the 1998 Commonwealth Games in Kuala Lumpur, Malaysia.

Tullett Was twice the British pole vault champion after winning the British AAA Championships title at the 1992 AAA Championships and by virtue of being the highest placed British athlete at the 1993 AAA Championships.

Tullett married Welsh runner Hayley Tullett (née Parry) in 1999.

Tullett is now a teacher at St Mary's Ascot School, Ascot (as of 2023), as a sport staff.
