= Athletics at the 1950 British Empire Games – Men's pole vault =

Men's pole vault at the Commonwealth Games

The men's pole vault event at the 1950 British Empire Games was held on 11 February at the Eden Park in Auckland, New Zealand.

== Results ==
Rank	Name	Nationality	Result	Notes
1st place, gold medalist(s)	Tim Anderson	England	13 ft 0 5/8 in (3.98 m)	
2nd place, silver medalist(s)	Stan Egerton	Canada	13 ft 0 5/8 in (3.98 m)	
3rd place, bronze medalist(s)	Peter Denton	Australia	12 ft 9 in (3.89 m)	
4	Wallace Heron	New Zealand	12 ft 9 in (3.89 m)	
5	Ron Miller	Canada	12 ft 5 7/8 in (3.81 m)	
6	George Martin	New Zealand	12 ft 3 in (3.73 m)	
7	Doug Robinson	Canada	12 ft 3 in (3.73 m)	
8	Mervyn Richards	New Zealand	12 ft 3 in (3.73 m)	
	Joshua Olotu	Nigeria	?	
