= Keith Stock =

British athlete

Personal information
- Nationality: British (English)
- Born: 18 March 1957 (age 69) Woolwich, London, England
- Height: 176 cm (5 ft 9 in)
- Weight: 73 kg (161 lb)

Sport
- Sport: Athletics
- Event: Pole vault
- Club: Haringey AC

Keith Frank Stock (born 18 March 1957) is a British male retired athlete who competed at the 1984 Summer Olympics.

== Biography ==
Stock finished third behind Australian Ray Boyd in the pole vault event at the 1975 AAA Championships.

He was denied winning an AAA title outright by fellow British pole vaulters Jeff Gutteridge and Brian Hooper but was considered the British pole vault champion by virtue of being the highest placed British athlete at the 1979 AAA Championships, 1981 AAA Championships and the 1985 AAA Championships.

Stock competed in the men's pole vault He represented England in the pole vault event, at the 1982 Commonwealth Games in Brisbane, Australia.
