= Julie Hollman =

English heptathlete

Personal information
- Nationality: British (English)
- Born: 16 February 1977; Peterborough, England
- Height: 177 cm (5 ft 10 in)
- Weight: 70 kg (154 lb)

Sport
- Sport: Athletics
- Event: heptathlon
- Club: Birchfield Harriers

Julie Caroline Hollman (born 16 February 1977) is an English former heptathlete who competed at the 2008 Summer Olympics.

== Biography ==
Hollman grew up in Deeping St James, attending The Deepings School. Her sister Anne was also a heptathlete. Her mother Carol was a team manager at Peterborough Athletic Club. She has a BSC in Sports Science with Geography and Environmental Issues from Brunel University.

Hollman, a member of Birchfield Harriers, finished second behind Clova Court in the heptathlon event at the 1997 AAA Championships before becoming British heptathlon champion after winning the British AAA Championships title at the 2000 AAA Championships.

Hollman represented England at the 2002 Commonwealth Games in Manchester, finishing fifth and finished fourteenth at the 2003 World Championships.

Hoolman represented England at the 2006 Commonwealth Games in Melbourne MARCH sixth at the 2006 Commonwealth Games. before winning the 2008 England Athletics Championships.

At the 2008 Olympic Games in Beijing, Hollman represented Great Britain and finished 32nd.

She is the British record holder for the contested Women's Decathlon. Her personal best result is 6135 points, achieved in June 2002 in Götzis.
