= Fred Housden =

English athletics coach

Personal information
- Nationality: British (English)
- Born: 2 July 1892 Sydenham, Kent, England
- Died: 21 February 1974 (aged 81) Surrey, England

Sport
- Sport: Athletics
- Event: Pole vault

Ernest Frederick Housden OBE MC TD (2 July 1892 – 21 February 1974) was an English athletics coach, pole vaulter and a 2012 inductee of the England Athletics Hall of Fame.

== Early life and military service ==
Housden was born in 1892, and attended The King's School, Canterbury from 1906 to 1911, playing in the school cricket team. He fought in the First World War, rising to Major in the Royal Field Artillery, and was awarded the Military Cross in the 1919 Birthday Honours for "distinguished service in connection with military operations in France and Flanders".

He was a Master at King's from 1919 to 1920, when he moved to Harrow School, where he worked until 1952, including a spell as acting Headmaster. After retiring from Harrow, he devoted himself full-time to his athletics coaching.

== Sporting career ==
Housden represented his country in the 110m hurdles and long jump,

Housden became the national pole vault champion after finishing as the highest placed athlete at the 1925 AAA Championships. Three years later he became British champion again after finishing runner-up the event behind Franklin Kelley at the 1928 AAA Championships and finished runner-up behind Howard Ford at the 1929 AAA Championships.

However, he is perhaps best-regarded for his coaching, where his proteges included Pat Pryce and David Hemery. Hemery credits Housden with improving his hurdling technique, and once revealed that Housden would write him poems about his races; he went on to win gold at the 1968 Mexico City Olympics.

Housden was appointed Officer of the Order of the British Empire (OBE) in the 1959 New Year Honours. In 1961, he collaborated with Geoff Dyson on the book The Mechanics of Athletics.

He died in 1974.
