= 2001 United Kingdom Championships in Athletics =

British athletics event

2001 United Kingdom Championships
- Host city: Glasgow
- Venue: Scotstoun Stadium
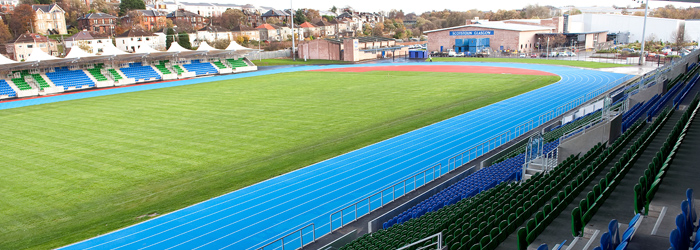
- Level: Senior
- Type: Outdoor
- Events: 1

The UK National Championships in athletics were held between 1977 and 1997, with a one-off event in 2001 to contest a women's steeplechase race. They were a major event in the UK athletics calendar. Unlike the AAA Championships, which were usually open to overseas athletes, the UK championships were only open to competitors from the United Kingdom. In 1980, the event incorporated the British trials for the Olympic Games.

The event was hosted at Scotstoun Stadium in Glasgow, Scotland.

== Medal summary ==
Event	Gold		Silver		Bronze	
3000m steeplechase	(Wales) Tara Krzywicki	9:55.01	Allison Higgins	10:55.70	Paula Gowing	11:26.15
