= Richard Webster (athlete) =

British pole vaulter (1914–2009)

Dick Webster
Personal information
- Nationality: British (English)
- Born: 31 December 1914 St Albans, England
- Died: 28 September 2009 (aged 94)

Sport
- Club: University of Cambridge AC; Achilles Club; Milocarian AC

Frederick Richard Webster (31 December 1914 – 28 September 2009) was a British Army officer (brigadier) and Olympic pole vaulter.

== Early life ==
His father was Lt-Col Frederick Annesley Michael Webster (27 June 1886 - 11 April 1949). His father attended St Albans Grammar School. His father was the English javelin-throwing champion in 1911 and 1923, who lived at Bradwell Juxta Coggeshall in north-west Essex. His father married Allison Mary Roberts on 12 October 1911, the daughter of a doctor in St Albans, and moved to Harpenden.

His father was the chief sports coach for British Universities in the 1930 International University Games in Germany, and was later the founder of the School of Athletics, Games and Physical Education at Loughborough College, and the head of the school from 1936-39. His father, with Evelyn Montague, an athlete who competed in the much-heralded 1924 Summer Olympics, started AAA summer schools at Loughborough, starting on August 18 1934. It was the first summer school for athletics in the UK. A tutor on the course was the sprinter Harold Abrahams.

Richard Webster was also a pole-vaulting coach, for the 1935 Loughborough summer school. He was educated at Bedford School and Christ's College, Cambridge.

== Career ==
Webster competed in both the 1936 Olympics and the 1948 Olympics. He held the British pole vaulting record between 1936 and 1950.

He also competed for England in the pole vault at the 1934 British Empire Games in London and four years later he competed for England at the 1938 British Empire Games in the pole vault again.

Webster was British pole vault champion in 1936, 1939 and 1948, after winning the event at the prestigious AAA Championships. He was also British champion in 1938 by virtue of being the highest placed British athlete.

== Personal life ==
He married around late 1939.

Webster served as an officer in the Royal Artillery during the Second World War, was evacuated from Dunkirk, and fought in North Africa and Italy. After the war, he worked as a military instructor in Egypt, retiring from the army with the rank of brigadier in 1967. Following his retirement, he worked as a farmer in South Africa.
