= Tim Thomas (athlete) =

Welsh male athlete

Personal information
- Nationality: British (Welsh)
- Born: 18 November 1973 (age 51) Neath, Wales

Sport
- Sport: Athletics
- Event: Pole vault
- Club: Swansea Herriers; Cardiff AAC

Timothy Thomas (born 18 November 1973) is a Welsh athlete who competed in the pole vault. He has a personal best performance of 5.55 metres.

== Biography ==
Thomas was educated at Cwrt Sart Comprehensive School.

Thomas competed for Wales at the 2002 Commonwealth Games in Manchester, England finishing 7th. He also achieved 7th place at the 2002 IAAF World Cup in Madrid, Spain.

Thomas was twice British pole vault champion after winning the British AAA Championships title at the 1997 AAA Championships and the 2004 AAA Championships. He also won two indoor titles in 2001 and 2003.
