= James Campbell (pole vaulter) =

British pole vaulter

Personal information
- Nationality: British
- Born: 4 November 1901 Queenscliff, Victoria, Australia
- Died: 2 July 1975 (aged 73) Dublin, Ireland

Sport
- Sport: Athletics
- Event: Pole vault
- Club: University of Cambridge AC; Achilles Club

James Harper Poynter Campbell also known as John Campbell (4 November 1901 – 2 July 1975) was a British athlete, who competed at the 1924 Summer Olympics.

== Career ==
Campbell finished second behind Donald Sumner in the pole jump event at the 1924 AAA Championships. Shortly afterwards he was selected for the British team at the 1924 Olympic Games in Paris where he finished equal 15th in qualifying during the men's pole vault event.

Campbell finished third behind Franklin Kelley in the pole jump event at the 1926 AAA Championships.
