= Chris Davidson (athlete) =

English male athlete

Personal information
- Nationality: British (English)
- Born: 4 December 1975 (age 50) Kent, England

Sport
- Sport: Athletics
- Event: Long Jump
- Club: Newham and Essex Beagles A.C.

Christopher Davidson (born 4 December 1975) is a male English athlete who competed in the long jump event.

== Biography ==
Davidson studied engineering at MidKent College, won the 1996 AAA indoor title.

He finished second behind Steve Phillips in the long jump event at the 1997 AAA Championships.

Davidson represented England at the 1998 Commonwealth Games in Kuala Lumpur, Malaysia finishing 8th. He also won three British indoor national titles in 1996, 1998 and 1999. He has a personal best distance of 7.90 metres.
