= Laurence Bond =

British pole vaulter (1905–1943)

Personal information
- Nationality: British (English)
- Born: 31 December 1905 Marylebone, London, England
- Died: 1 December 1943 (aged 37) Westcliff-on-Sea, England

Sport
- Sport: Athletics
- Event: Pole vault
- Club: University of Cambridge AC; Achilles Club

Laurence Temple Bond (31 December 1905 – 1 December 1943) was a British athlete who competed at the 1928 Summer Olympics.

== Biography ==
At the 1928 Olympic Games in Amsterdam, Bond competed in the men's pole vault, finishing 10th and just failing to reach the final.

Bond competed in the pole vault at the 1930 British Empire Games for England. At the time of the 1930 Games, he was a medical student at the University of Cambridge.

Bond finished third behind Henry Lindblad in the pole vault event at the 1931 AAA Championships, by which time he had become a doctor.

Bond finished third behind Danilo Innocenti in the pole vault event at the 1933 AAA Championships.
