= Janine Whitlock =

English pole vaulter

Personal information
- Nationality: British (English)
- Born: 11 August 1973 (age 52) Dewsbury, West Yorkshire, England
- Height: 165 cm (5 ft 5 in)
- Weight: 54 kg (119 lb)

Sport
- Sport: Athletics
- Event: pole vault
- Club: Trafford AC

Janine Whitlock (born 11 August 1973) is a former pole vaulter from England who competed at the 2000 Summer Olympics.

== Biography ==
Whitlock finished second behind Kate Staples in the pole vault event at the 1996 AAA Championships before becoming the British pole vault champion after winning the British AAA Championships titles at the 1997 AAA Championships and the 1997 British Athletics Championships.

After defending her AAA crown in July, she represented England at the 1998 Commonwealth Games in Kuala Lumpur, Malaysia in September.

Further AAA titles followed in 1999, 2000 and 2001 sandwiched by her selection to represent Great Britain at the 2000 Olympic Games in Sydney.

In 2002 Whitlock was found guilty of methandienone doping. The sample was delivered on 16 June 2002 during the English Commonwealth Games trials. She received a suspension from July 2002 to July 2004 and was stripped of her 2002 AAA title.

Her personal best is 4.47 metres, achieved in July 2005 at the Crystal Palace National Sports Centre, in the same meet that Yelena Isinbayeva became the first woman to clear 5 metres. The same year Whitlock won her sixth and last AAA title.

== Achievements ==
Year	Competition	Venue	Position	Notes
Representing Great Britain and England
1998	Commonwealth Games	Kuala Lumpur, Malaysia	4th	
1999	World Indoor Championships	Maebashi, Japan	12th	
2000	Olympics	Sydney, Australia	20th	
2001	World Championships	Edmonton, Canada	9th	
2005	European Indoor Championships	Madrid, Spain	9th	
2005	World Championships	Helsinki, Finland	14th	

== See also ==
- List of sportspeople sanctioned for doping offences
