= Neil Winter =

Welsh pole vaulter

Personal information
- Nationality: British (Welsh)
- Born: 21 March 1974 (age 52) Chippenham, England
- Height: 187 cm (6 ft 2 in)
- Weight: 83 kg (183 lb)

Sport
- Sport: Athletics
- Event: Pole vault
- Club: Shaftesbury Barnet Harriers
Medal record
athletics
Representing Wales
Commonwealth Games
Gold medal – first place	1994 Victoria BC	pole vault

Neil Stephen Winter (born 21 March 1974) is an English born former pole vaulter from Wales, who competed at the 1996 Summer Olympics.

== Biography ==
Winter's successes began as a junior athlete and, as at September 2013, he still holds the British records in the under 20 (5.50 metres), under 17 (5.20 metres), and under 13 (3.40 metres) categories.

He won the gold medal at the 1994 Commonwealth Games in Victoria, Canada. At the 1996 Olympic Games in Atlanta, he represented Great Britain in the pole vault event.

His personal best jump is 5.60 metres, achieved in August 1995 in San Giuliano Terme.

In 1992, as an U20 competitor, Neil was ranked number 2 in the world at a height of 5.50m. In the same year, he came fourth in the World Junior Championships in Seol.

In 1993, still as an U20 competitor, he was European Junior number 1.

Winter finished second behind Nick Buckfield in the pole vault event at the 1996 AAA Championships.[1][2]

His career came to a premature end at the age of 22 due to multiple injuries.

Winter was inducted into the Welsh Athletics Hall of Fame in November 2014.
