= Andrew Penn (race walker) =

British racewalker

Personal information
- Nationality: British (English)
- Born: 31 March 1967 (age 58) Nuneaton, England
- Height: 178 cm (5 ft 10 in)
- Weight: 57 kg (126 lb)

Sport
- Sport: Athletics
- Event: Racewalking
- Club: Coventry Godiva Harriers

Andrew Shaun Penn (born 31 March 1967) is a former British racewalker. He competed in the men's 20 kilometres walk at the 1992 Summer Olympics.

== Biography ==
At the 1992 Olympic Games in Barcelona, he represented Great Britain in the 20km walk and finished 23rd.

Penn became the British 10,000 metres walk champion after winning the British AAA Championships title at the 1997 British Athletics Championships.
