= Lynn Gibson =

British

Personal information
- Nationality: British (English)
- Born: 6 July 1969 (age 56) Oxford, Oxfordshire, England

Sport
- Sport: Athletics
- Event: middle-distance
- Club: Oxford City Athletic Club

Lynn Marie Gibson (born 1969) is a female former athlete who competed for England.

== Biography ==
Gibson, a member of Oxford City Athletic Club, became the British 1500 metres champion after winning the British AAA Championships title at the 1998 AAA Championships.

She represented England in the 1,500 metres event, at the 1994 Commonwealth Games in Victoria, Canada. Four years later she represented England again, at the 1998 Commonwealth Games in Kuala Lumpur, Malaysia.
