= Kevin Hughes (pole vaulter) =

British athlete

Personal information
- Nationality: British (English)
- Born: 30 April 1973 (age 52) Rochford, Essex, England
- Height: 185 cm (6 ft 1 in)
- Weight: 76 kg (168 lb)

Sport
- Sport: Athletics
- Event: Pole vault
- Club: Enfield and Haringey AC

Kevin Michael Hughes (born 30 April 1973) is a British former athlete who competed at the 2000 Summer Olympics.

== Biography ==
At the 2000 Olympic Games in Sydney, Hughes represented Great Britain in the men's pole vault competition.

Hughes represented England in the pole vault event, at the 1998 Commonwealth Games in Kuala Lumpur, Malaysia. Four years later he represented England again in the pole vault at the 2002 Commonwealth Games.

Hughes was a three-times British pole vault champion after winning the British AAA Championships title at the 1998 AAA Championships, the 1999 AAA Championships and the 2000 AAA Championships.
