= Steve Phillips (long jumper) =

English male athlete

Personal information
- Nationality: British (English)
- Born: 17 March 1972 (age 53)

Sport
- Sport: Athletics
- Event: Long jump
- Club: Rugby & Northampton AC

Steve Phillips (born 17 March 1972) is an English athlete who competed in the long jump event. He has a personal best distance of 8.03 metres.

== Biography ==
Phillips represented England at the 1998 Commonwealth Games in Kuala Lumpur, Malaysia finishing 7th and represented Great Britain at the 1998 IAAF World Cup in Johannesburg, South Africa finishing 8th.

He was the first British athlete to win a gold medal in the men's long jump at the European Under 20 Athletics Championships, winning in Thessaloniki, Greece in 1991. This represented Britain's first gold medal in the men's long jump at European, World or Olympic level for nearly 25 years, the last being 1964 Olympic gold medallist Lynn Davies winning gold at the 1967 European Indoor Games.

Phillips was a three-time British long jump champion after winning the British AAA Championships title at the 1997 AAA Championships and 1999 AAA Championships, in addition to winning the 1997 British Athletics Championships. Phillips also won one indoor title in 1997. In 2000 he suffered a torn achilles tendon which ended his bid for selection for the Sydney 2000 Summer Olympics.
