= Barry Thomas (decathlete) =

British decathlete

Personal information
- Nationality: British (English)
- Born: 28 April 1972 (age 53) Bucklow, Cheshire, England

Sport
- Sport: Athletics
- Event: Decathlon

Barry van Someren Thomas (born 28 April 1972) is a male former athlete who competed for England.

== Biography ==
Thomas is a three times British champion in 1993, 1994 and 1996 after winning the British decathlon title.

He represented England in the decathlon event, at the 1998 Commonwealth Games in Kuala Lumpur, Malaysia. Four years later he represented England again at the 2002 Commonwealth Games.
