= Howard Ford (decathlete) =

British pole vaulter and decathlete

Personal information
- Nationality: British
- Born: 18 December 1905 Hawarden, Flintshire, Wales
- Died: 28 March 1986 (aged 80) St James's, London, England

Sport
- Sport: Athletics
- Event: decathlon
- Club: University of Cambridge AC; Achilles Club
Medal record
Men's athletics
Representing England
British Empire Games
Silver medal – second place	1930 Hamilton	Pole vault

Howard Ford (18 December 1905 – 28 March 1986) was a Welsh born, British track and field athlete who competed at the 1928 Summer Olympics.

== Biography ==
Ford was born in Hawarden, Flintshire, Wales and was educated at Blundell's School and Pembroke College, Cambridge, where he represented them in skiing and shot put.

He finished second behind Harry Hart in the decathlon event at the 1928 AAA Championships. Shortly afterwards he represented Great Britain at the 1928 Olympic Games in Amsterdam, Netherlands, where he was eliminated after eight events of the Olympic decathlon competition.

At the 1930 British Empire Games he won the silver medal in the pole vault contest. In the shot put event he finished fifth and in the discus throw competition he finished sixth.

Ford joined the Royal Air Force and later became a Air Vice Marshal before he retired in 1962. He died in St James's, London.
