= Tracy Axten =

British discus thrower (born 1963)

Personal information
- Nationality: British (English)
- Born: 20 July 1963 (age 62) Portsmouth, England

Sport
- Sport: Athletics
- Event: discus throw
- Club: Borough of Hounslow AC

Tracy Axten (born 20 July 1963) is a female English retired discus thrower.

== Biography ==
Axten finished third behind Jackie McKernan in the discus throw event at the 1992 AAA Championships and improved to second place in 1993 before another third place in 1997.

Axten represented England in the discus event, at the 1998 Commonwealth Games in Kuala Lumpur, Malaysia.

Her personal best throw was 58.18 metres, achieved in May 1997 in Cardiff. This places her seventh on the British outdoor all-time list, behind Meg Ritchie, Venissa Head, Philippa Roles, Shelley Newman, Jackie McKernan and Debbie Callaway. She was also the 1993 British champion.
