= Lyn Sprules =

English hammer thrower

Personal information
- Nationality: British (English)
- Born: 11 September 1975 (age 50) Surrey, England

Sport
- Sport: Athletics
- Event: hammer throw
- Club: Borough of Hounslow AC

Lyn Sprules (born 11 September 1975) is an English retired hammer thrower.

== Biography ==
Sprules became a double British hammer throw champion after winning the British AAA Championships titles at the 1996 AAA Championships and 1997 AAA Championships.

Sprules represented England in the hammer throw event, at the 1998 Commonwealth Games in Kuala Lumpur, Malaysia and the following year in 1999 regained the AAA title for her third success.

Sprules personal best throw is 63.96 metres, achieved in August 2000 in Bedford. This places her fourth on the British outdoor all-time list, behind Lorraine Shaw, Shirley Webb and Zoe Derham.

== International competitions ==
Year	Competition	Venue	Position	Notes
Representing Great Britain and England
1997	European U23 Championships	Turku, Finland	3rd	61.70 m
1998	European Championships	Budapest, Hungary	12th	57.68 m
1998	Commonwealth Games	Kuala Lumpur, Malaysia	7th	59.01 m
