= Kevin Brown (discus thrower) =

British-Jamaican discus thrower

Personal information
- Nationality: Jamaican/English
- Born: 10 September 1964 (age 61) Jamaica
- Website: https://kevinbrownathlete.com/

Sport
- Sport: Discus

Kevin Dave Brown (born 1964) is a former discus athlete who competed for England and Jamaica.

== Athletics career ==
Brown was English national champion after winning the 1994 AAA Championships.

He represented England in the discus event, at the 1994 Commonwealth Games in Victoria, British Columbia, Canada. Eight years later he represented Jamaica in the 2002 Commonwealth Games.

== Truck pulling ==
In 2020, Brown broke a world record in truck pulling, dragging a two-ton Range Rover 69 metres in 45.58 seconds. He made the attempt in the memory of a friend who had died of cancer.
