= Matt O'Dowd (runner) =

British athlete

Personal information
- Nationality: British (English)
- Born: 15 April 1976 (age 50) Swindon, England
- Height: 173 cm (5 ft 8 in)
- Weight: 60 kg (132 lb)

Sport
- Sport: Athletics
- Event: Long-distance / marathon
- Club: Swindon Harriers

Matthew O'Dowd (born 15 April 1976) is a former long-distance runner who competed at the 2004 Summer Olympics.

== Biography ==
At the 2004 Olympic Games in Athens, O'Dowd represented Great Britain in the men's marathon.

O'Dowd became the British 3000 metres champion after winning the British AAA Championships title at the 1996 AAA Championships. He also finished on the podium on two occasions in the 5,000 metres event in 1999 and 2000

Additionally, O'Dowd was classified British 10,000 metres champion by virtue of being the highest placed British athlete at the 2004 AAA Championships.
