= Karen Martin =

Retired English international javelin thrower

Personal information
- Nationality: British (English)
- Born: 24 November 1974 (age 51) Derby, England

Sport
- Sport: Athletics
- Event: javelin throw
- Club: Derby AC/RAF
Medal record
Athletics
Representing England
Commonwealth Games
Silver medal – second place	1998 Kuala Lumpur	javelin

Karen Lesley Martin (born 24 November 1974) is an English former international javelin thrower.

== Biography ==
Martin was born in Derby and attended Littleover Community School in Derby.

Martin represented England and won a silver medal in the javelin, at the 1998 Commonwealth Games in Kuala Lumpur, Malaysia.

Her personal best throw is 59.50 metres, achieved in July 1999 in Cosford. This places her third on the British outdoor all-time list, behind Kelly Morgan and Goldie Sayers.

Martin twice became the British javelin throw champion after winning the British AAA Championships titles at the 1997 AAA Championships and 2001 AAA Championships.

== International competitions ==
Year	Competition	Venue	Position	Notes
Representing Great Britain and England
1992	World Junior Championships	Seoul, South Korea	14th (q)	50.22 m
1998	Commonwealth Games	Kuala Lumpur, Malaysia	2nd	57.82 m
2002	Commonwealth Games	Manchester, United Kingdom	7th	50.28 m
