= Christian Stephenson =

British middle-distance runner

Personal information
- Nationality: British (Welsh)
- Born: 22 July 1974 (age 51) South Glamorgan, Wales
- Height: 172 cm (5 ft 8 in)
- Weight: 54 kg (119 lb)

Sport
- Sport: Middle-distance running
- Event: Steeplechase
- Club: Cardiff AAC

Christian Paul Stephenson (born 22 July 1974) is a British middle-distance runner who competed at the 2000 Summer Olympics.

== Biography ==
At the 2000 Olympic Games in Sydney, he represented Great Britain in the men's 3000 metres steeplechase.

Stephenson was three-times British 3000 metres steeplechase champion after winning the British AAA Championships title from 1998 to 2000.
