= Kate Staples =

British pole vaulter

Kate Staples MBE
Personal information
- Nationality: British (English)
- Born: Katharine Joanna Staples; 2 November 1965 (age 60) Westminster, London, England

Sport
- Sport: Athletics
- Event: Pole Vault
- Club: Essex Ladies AC

Katharine Joanna Staples (born 2 November 1965) is a British female former pole vaulter. In 1992, she became the first British woman to vault over three metres.

== Biography ==
Born in Westminster, London, Staples went on to win the 1993 UK Championships, the AAA Championships three times (1993, 1994, 1996), and the AAA Indoor Championships three times (1994, 1995, 1996), and broke the British record more than 25 times, peaking at 3.90 metres on 26 May 1996 (she cleared an unofficial 3.90 m in June 1995).

She is also known for her role as Zodiac in the ITV series Gladiators, from 1993 to 1996. She had a daughter, Gabriella, with fellow Gladiators performer Mark Griffin.

She later married Chris Sheasby, an England rugby union international, and the couple had two children, but separated in 2011 and divorced in 2016.

In 2025, Staples was appointed an MBE for "services to the promotion of Sport and Fitness".

== International competitions ==
Year	Competition	Venue	Position	Notes
Representing Great Britain
1996	European Indoor Championships	Stockholm, Sweden	11th	3.85 m
