= Connie Henry =

Former British athlete

Connie Henry MBE
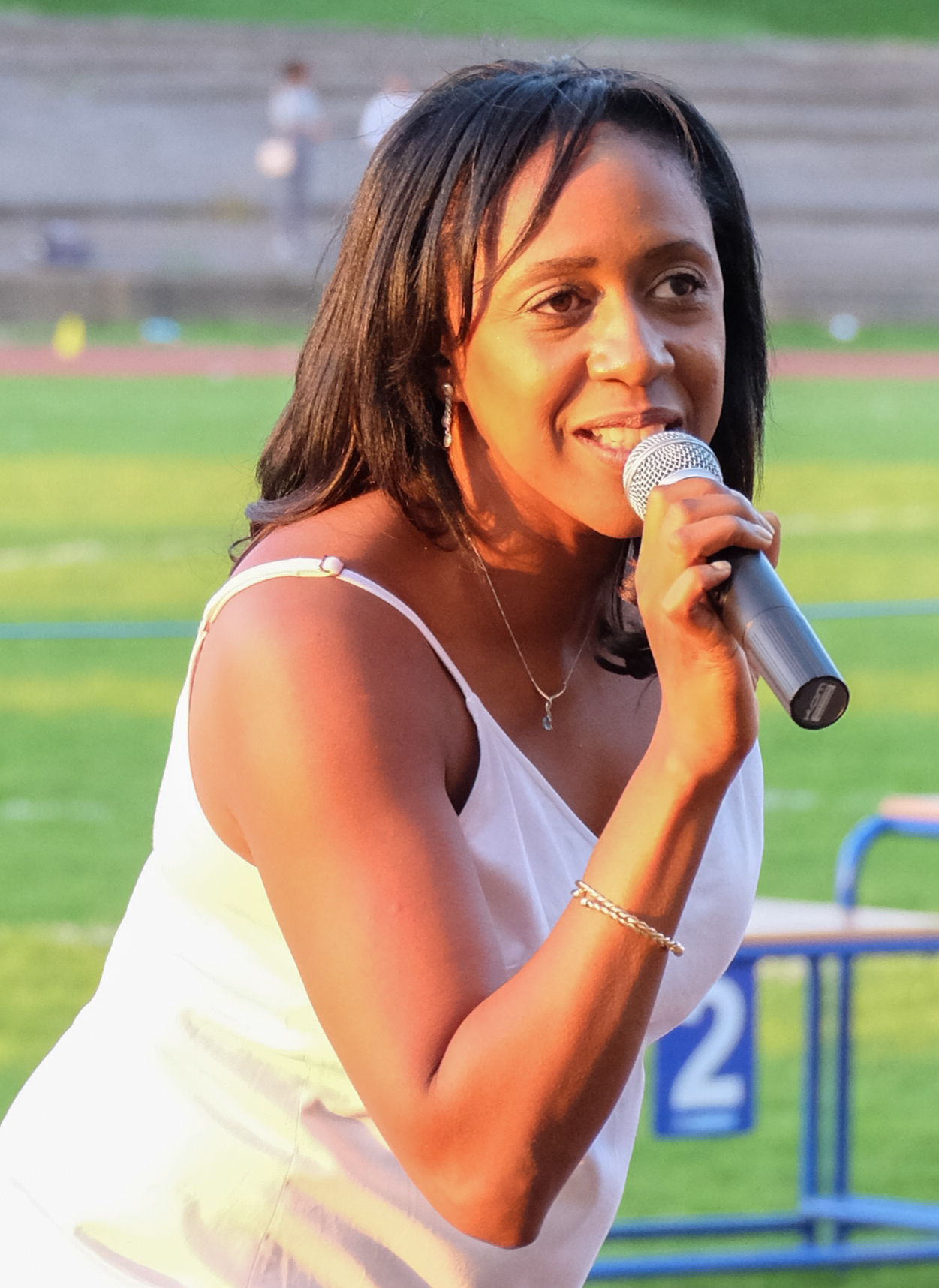
- Henry in 2017

Personal information
- Nationality: British (English)
- Born: 15 April 1972 (age 54) London, England

Sport
- Sport: Athletics
- Event: triple jump
- Club: Shaftesbury Barnet Harriers
Medal record
Athletics
Representing England
Commonwealth Games
Bronze medal – third place	1998 Kuala Lumpur	triple jump

Connie Cynthia Henry MBE (born 15 April 1972) is a female social mobility consultant and former international triple jumper who won bronze in the 1998 Commonwealth Games in Kuala Lumpur. She was founder of Track Academy by Connie Henry in north-west London, a registered charity which supports young people from disadvantaged backgrounds through sport, education and mentoring, thus creating social mobility.

== Biography ==
Connie grew up in Kilburn, north-west London and attended St Mary's Primary School in Kilburn and St James' High School in Colindale, London. A promising athlete from a young age, she joined Shaftesbury Barnet Harriers at the age of 15, training under Dave Johnson at the Willesden Sports Centre. She began competing internationally in her late teens, and later with financial support from the National Lottery.

Connie gained a degree in sports science and history at St Mary's University before completing a PGCE at Brunel University. Discovering she had dyslexia, she decided to concentrate on athletics rather than follow a career in teaching.

== Athletics career ==
Connie's early successes included taking silver at the 1992 AAA Championships at the Alexander Stadium in Birmingham. Training under Frank Attoh, she then won the AAA bronze medal in 1996 with a jump of 13.55m, coming behind Ashia Hansen and Michelle Griffith-Robinson. She came third at the briefly-revived UK Athletics Championships in 1997, again joining Hansen and Griffith-Robinson on the podium.

Connie moved to Sydney in the autumn of 1997 to train with Keith Connor, a former British Olympic triple jump medallist and then-Australian head coach.

The 1998 season proved to be the peak of her career, starting with a triple jump victory at that year's AAA Championships. She also set an Australian all-comers record of 13.86m, leading to an invitation to compete in the country's national championships.

In the summer of 1998, she set a personal best of 13.95m in Thurrock, took fourth at the 1998 European Cup, and represented Great Britain at the 1998 European Athletics Championships.

Her season culminated in a bronze medal at the 1998 Commonwealth Games, where she jumped 13.94m to finish behind Hansen and Cameroonian Françoise Mbango.

After coming third at the 2000 AAA Championships, Connie decided to retire from professional athletics, returning to live in the UK.

She then moved into sports journalism, providing commentary for broadcasters such as Eurosport, Sky and the BBC, reporting on events such as the IAAF World Championships in Athletics and the Summer Olympics. She also worked with boxing promoter Frank Warren, a role which saw her broadcast from the heavyweight match between Vitali Klitschko and Danny Williams in Las Vegas.

== Track Academy ==
Connie launched Track Academy by Connie Henry in 2007 at the Willesden Sports Centre in London, where she herself trained as a teenager. Now a registered charity, the organisation uses sport, education and mentoring to support young people, helping to reduce the negative impact of gangs, drugs and crime.

The work of Connie Henry was featured in an ITV documentary, Run For Your Life, in April 2019.

Connie Retired from Track Academy in 2024.

Henry was appointed Member of the Order of the British Empire (MBE) in the 2022 Birthday Honours for charitable services to young people through sports and education.

== Sport Gives Back ==
Connie is the creator of the Sport Gives Back Awards, an initiative to celebrate those who have transformed the lives of others through sport. The inaugural awards ceremony was held in March 2020 at The Royal Institution in London's Mayfair, hosted by Olympian Jeanette Kwakye. Sporting legends including Lord Sebastian Coe, Daley Thompson CBE, Dame Kelly Holmes, Greg Rusedski, Lee Dixon and Olympic hockey champion Crista Cullen MBE were in attendance. The ceremony was later broadcast on ITV.

Ten charities from across the country selected nominees who have made a major impact on individuals and communities through sport:

Hannah Brooman (Active Communities Network)

Liz Johnson (Dame Kelly Holmes Trust)

St Paul's Way Trust School (Greenhouse Sports)

Sam Alderson (Lord's Taverners)

Ozgur Has (Saracens Sport Foundation)

John Hambly (The Samson Centre for Multiple Sclerosis)

Tony Barclay (Sported)

Shotley & Benfieldside Tennis Club (Sport Works)

Laura Dredger (Yorke Dance Project)

Saadia Abubaker (Youth Sport Trust)

The event was sponsored by Actonians RFC, Bride Hall Group, British Athletics, DHL, JR Sports Stars, Nationwide Building Society, Refinitiv, Simmons & Simmons, Sport England and Travers Smith.

Plans for the second Sport Gives Back in 2021 were postponed due to the COVID-19 pandemic.

== MBE & the State Funeral of Queen Elizabeth II ==
Henry was appointed Member of the Order of the British Empire (MBE) in the 2022 Birthday Honours for charitable services to young people through sports and education. She was later one of 200 people from the Honours' list to be invited to attend Queen Elizabeth II's funeral. Connie said: "I was extremely honoured to have been invited to say goodbye to the Queen. The journey from young woman to wife and great grandmother is fraught enough. To also bear the weight of the Crown with such grace and fortitude deserves our admiration and respect. Let us not forget, we will not in our lifetime witness another Queen. It is a memory I will appreciate and cherish forever."

== Personal life ==
Connie lives in Buckinghamshire with her husband and son.
