= Denise Lewis =

British athlete and media personality (born 1972)

Dame Denise Lewis DBE
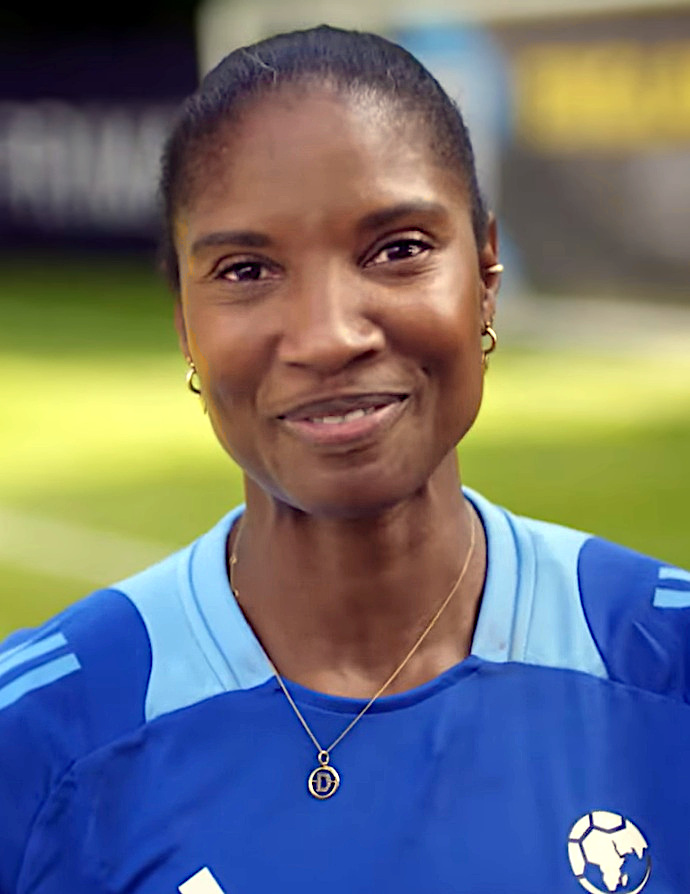
- Denise Lewis at Soccer Aid for Unicef (2025)

Personal information
- Born: 27 August 1972 (age 53) West Bromwich, Staffordshire, England, United Kingdom
- Height: 5 ft 9 in (1.75 m)

Sport
- Country: Great Britain
- Sport: Athletics
- Event: Heptathlon
- Club: Birchfield Harriers; Wolverhampton & Bilston AC
- Coached by: Charles van Commenee, Darrell Bunn
- Retired: 2005

Achievements and titles
- Personal best: 6,831 pts (2000)
Medal record
Women's athletics
Representing Great Britain
Olympic Games
Gold medal – first place	2000 Sydney	Heptathlon
Bronze medal – third place	1996 Atlanta	Heptathlon
World Championships
Silver medal – second place	1997 Athens	Heptathlon
Silver medal – second place	1999 Sevilla	Heptathlon
European Championships
Gold medal – first place	1998 Budapest	Heptathlon
European Cup
Gold medal – first place	1995 Helmond	Heptathlon
Silver medal – second place	2003 Brixen	Heptathlon
Representing England
Commonwealth Games
Gold medal – first place	1994 Victoria	Heptathlon
Gold medal – first place	1998 Kuala Lumpur	Heptathlon

Dame Denise Rosemarie Lewis (born 27 August 1972) is a British sports administrator and former sports presenter and athletics athlete, who specialised in the heptathlon.

She won the gold medal in the heptathlon at the 2000 Sydney Olympics, was twice Commonwealth Games champion, was the 1998 European Champion, and won World Championships silver medals in 1997 and 1999. She was the first European to win the Olympic heptathlon, though Europeans, including Briton Mary Peters, had won the Olympic pentathlon precursor event.

Her personal best score for the heptathlon is 6,831 points, set at the Décastar meeting in 2000. That is a former British record and ranks her third on the all-time British lists behind double World, double Commonwealth Games champion Katarina Johnson-Thompson and Olympic, three-time World and European champion Jessica Ennis-Hill. Along with these two and pentathletes Mary Rand and Dame Mary Peters, Lewis is recognised as one of Britain's greatest female multi-eventers, and the first in the line of British global champions in heptathlon.

Since retiring from athletics, she has undertaken work on television and other media work, and was a regular athletics pundit for BBC Television, including during the Olympic Games in London 2012, Rio 2016, Tokyo 2020 and Paris 2024. It was announced that she had stepped down from her role at the BBC on the conclusion of the athletics programme at the 2024 Games.

In addition to her media work, Lewis is president of Commonwealth Games England which is the official Commonwealth Games Association for England at the Commonwealth Games and, since 2023, president of UK Athletics, the governing body for the sport of Athletics in the United Kingdom.

== Early career ==
In her early heptathlete career at senior level Lewis won gold at the 1994 Commonwealth Games, bronze at the 1996 Olympics, silver at the 1997 World Championships, gold at the 1998 Commonwealth Games and European Championships and silver at the 1999 World Championships.

== 2000 Olympics ==
The first day of the 2000 Summer Olympics heptathlon was 23 September. In the first event, Lewis recorded 13.23 seconds for the 100 metres hurdles, to be in second place behind the world champion, Eunice Barber, who had finished in 12.97 seconds. Ghada Shouaa, the 1996 Olympic champion, pulled out after only 20 metres of her heat.

After a poor performance in the high jump, clearing only 1.75m, some way off her personal best, Lewis was in eighth place, 152 points behind Barber who had increased her lead. In the third event, the shot put, Lewis recorded a distance of 15.55m, placing her second, 30 points behind Natallia Sazanovich and 45 points ahead of former world champion Sabine Braun. Barber's distance of 11.27m put her in eighth place.

In the final event of the day, the 200 metres, Lewis recorded a time of 24.34 sec. Braun's time placed her in sixth position. A strong run by Natalya Roshchupkina moved her from sixth position to second, pushing Lewis into third place.

At the end of the first day, the points scored were:

1. Natallia Sazanovich, BLR: 3,903
2. Natalya Roshchupkina, RUS: 3,872
3. Denise Lewis, GBR: 3,852
4. Urszula Włodarczyk, POL: 3,805
5. Yelena Prokhorova, RUS: 3,771
6. Sabine Braun, GER: 3,770
7. Eunice Barber, FRA: 3,707
8. Karin Specht-Ertl, GER: 3,697

The first event on the second day was the long jump. Lewis's best jump was 6.48m, marginally behind Yelena Prokhorova and Sazanovich. Eunice Barber, struggling with injury, withdrew after this event. In event six, the javelin, Lewis achieved a throw of 50.19m. With her closest rivals some way further back she moved into first place, with Sazanovich 63 points behind in second place and Prokhorova in third a further 83 points behind.

In the final event, the 800 metres, Lewis ran with the lower part of her left leg bandaged due to a calf and Achilles tendon injury, aiming to stay close enough to the race leaders to maintain her points advantage. Prokhorova won the race convincingly and when Lewis crossed the line behind Sazanovich it was not clear, at first, if Lewis's time of 2:16.83 was enough to retain first place. After the individual points had been calculated, it was announced that Lewis had won with a total of 6,584 points. Prokhorova was second with 6,531 (53 points behind Lewis), and Sazanovich was third with 6,527 (4 points behind Prokhorova).

== 2004 Olympics ==
At the 2004 Olympics, Lewis was suffering from a number of injuries and withdrew from the competition after the long jump. Teammate and training partner Kelly Sotherton took bronze.

== Statistics ==
=== Personal bests ===
Event	Best	Date	Meeting	Venue	Notes
100 m hurdles	13.13 seconds	29 July 2000	Décastar	Talence, France	
200 m	24.06 seconds	25 May 1996	Hypo-Meeting	Götzis, Austria	
800 m	2 min 12.20 seconds	30 July 2000	Décastar	Talence, France	
High jump	1.87 m	21 August 1999	1999 World Championships in Athletics	Seville, Spain	
Long jump	6.69 m	30 July 2000	Décastar	Talence, France	
Shot put	16.12 m	21 August 1999	1999 World Championships in Athletics	Seville, Spain	
Javelin	54.82 m	28 July 1996	1996 Atlanta Olympic Games	Atlanta, United States	
Heptathlon	6,831 points	30 July 2000	Décastar	Talence, France	100H 13.13; HJ 1.84; SP 15.07; 200m 24.01w LJ 6.69; JT 49.42; 800m 2:12.20

=== Seasonal bests ===
View source data.

=== International competitions ===
Year	Competition	Venue	Position	Event	Notes
1991	European Junior Championships	Thessaloniki, Greece	5th	Heptathlon	5,476 pts
1994	Commonwealth Games	Victoria, Canada	8th	Long jump	6.32 m
1994	Commonwealth Games	Victoria, Canada	1st	Heptathlon	6,325 pts
1994	European Championships	Helsinki, Finland	19th (q)	Long jump	6.20 m
1995	European Cup Combined Events	Helmond, Netherlands	1st	Heptathlon	6,299 pts
1995	World Championships	Gothenburg, Sweden	7th	Heptathlon	6,299 pts
1996	European Indoor Championships	Stockholm, Sweden	8th	Long jump	6.42 m
1996	European Cup	Madrid, Spain	4th	Long jump	6.66 m
1996	Olympic Games	Atlanta, United States	23rd (q)	Long jump	6.33 m
1996	Olympic Games	Atlanta, United States	3rd	Heptathlon	6,489 pts
1997	European Cup	Munich, Germany	4th	Long jump	6.56
1997	World Championships	Athens, Greece	2nd	Heptathlon	6,654 pts
1998	Commonwealth Games	Kuala Lumpur, Malaysia	1st	Heptathlon	6,513
1998	European Championships	Budapest, Hungary	1st	Heptathlon	6,559 pts
1999	World Championships	Seville, Spain	2nd	Heptathlon	6,724 pts
2000	Olympic Games	Sydney, Australia	1st	Heptathlon	6,584 pts
2001	World Championships	Edmonton, Canada	—	Heptathlon	DNS
2003	European Cup Combined Events 1st League	Tallinn, Estonia	2nd	Heptathlon	6,282 pts
2003	World Championships	Paris, France	5th	Heptathlon	6,254 pts
2004	Olympic Games	Athens, Greece	—	Heptathlon	DNF

=== National titles ===
- AAA Championships
  - Long jump: 1996, 1998
- AAA Indoor Championships
  - 60 m hurdles: 1997
  - Long jump: 1994, 1995, 1998
  - Shot put: 2004†

† Lewis was the top placed Briton at the 2004 AAA Indoor shot put behind Sweden's Helena Engman

- AAA Junior Championships
  - Heptathlon (under-17): 1988
  - Long jump: 1989
- British Schools International Match
  - Long jump: 1988
- English Schools Championships
  - Long jump: 1986 (junior), 1987 (intermediate)

=== Circuit wins ===
- Décastar: 2000

== Honours, awards and recognition ==
For services to sport, Lewis was appointed Member of the Order of the British Empire (MBE) in the 1999 New Year Honours, Officer of the Order of the British Empire (OBE) in the 2001 New Year Honours and Dame Commander of the Order of the British Empire (DBE) in the 2023 New Year Honours .

In 2000, Lewis was also presented with the Freedom of the City of the Wolverhampton. Lewis, in 2013, was honoured at the annual Wolverhampton Famous Sons & Daughters Awards ceremony, and in 2014, was presented with an honorary degree from the University of Wolverhampton. She was also inducted into the Wolverhampton Sporting Hall of Fame in 2010, followed by the England Athletics Hall of Fame in 2011.

With Dame Kelly Holmes, Christine Ohuruogu and Paula Radcliffe, Lewis enjoys acclamation as one of the "golden girls" of British athletics and, in 1998 and 2000, was runner-up in the BBC Sports Personality of the Year. In 2003, Lewis was put forward as a candidate in the BBC Midlands great Midlander of all-time award but lost to the eventual winner, Reginald Mitchell, the inventor of the Supermarine Spitfire.

Lewis was voted "Sportswoman of the Year" three times by the Sports Journalists' Association (SJA), in 1997, 1998 and 2000, at that time a joint-record. She was also runner up in 1996. She was selected as "Female Athlete of the Year" by the British Athletics Writers' Association (BAWA) four times, in 1996, 1997, 1998, and 2000. Lewis won the Sunday Times "Sportswoman of the Year" a record three times, in 1994, 1998 and 2000.

At the inaugural British Ethnic Diversity Sports Awards (BEDSA) in 2015, Lewis became the first recipient of the Lifetime Achievement Award. She was rated as the Most Inspirational Sportswoman of 1998 and 2000 by Women's Health.

Her British and Commonwealth record of 6831 points was set on 30 July 2000 in Talence, France. As of 2013, she ranked 15th in the Heptathlon all-time list.

In 2002, Lewis's Olympic victory was ranked 90th in Channel 4's 100 Greatest Sporting Moments.

In 2010, Lewis was made a Patron of the Jaguar Academy of Sport.

In addition to her sports achievements, Lewis was included in the 2019 edition of the Powerlist, ranking the 100 most influential Black Britons.

== Television career ==
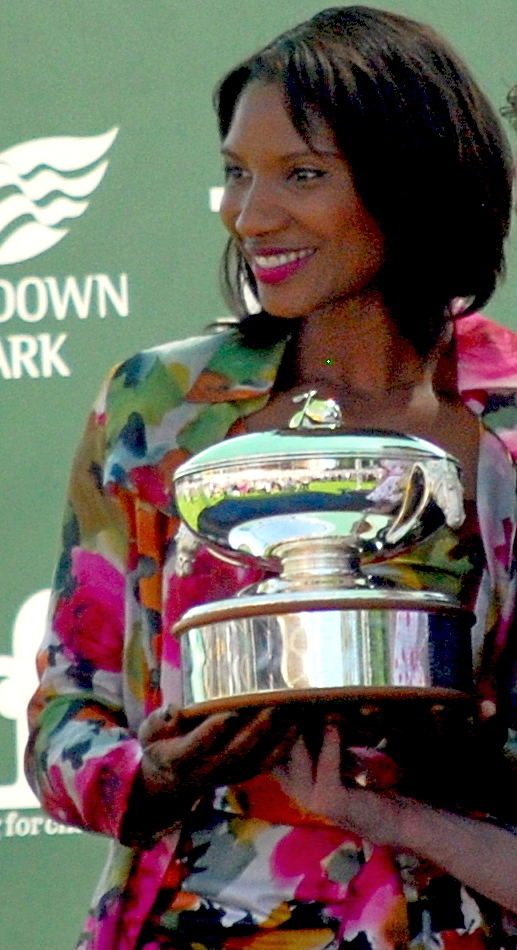
Lewis at National Hunt racing awards 2011

=== Punditry and presenting ===
Since 2009, Lewis has acted as a pundit for BBC Sport's athletics coverage and she has covered major live events including the 2009 World Athletics Championships, 2010 Commonwealth Games, 2012 Summer Olympics, 2014 Commonwealth Games, 2016 Summer Olympics, 2018 Commonwealth Games, 2020 Summer Olympics, 2022 Commonwealth Games and 2024 Summer Olympics. The Paris 2024 Games were Lewis' final appearance as a pundit for the BBC as she left to take up the position of President of UK Athletics.

On 2 February 2015, Lewis guest hosted an episode of The One Show with Matt Baker.

Lewis has also been a presenter on various non-sports television programmes. In July 2015, she co-hosted Right on the Money, a daytime series on BBC One, alongside Dominic Littlewood. The programme returned for a second series in July 2016. From 22 July 2011, Lewis hosted children's reality television show Camp Orange. She is a presenter of the BBC's Secret Britain (series 3 onwards) which introduced lesser-known aspects of the British countryside.

=== Strictly Come Dancing ===
In 2004, Lewis took part in the BBC dancing competition, Strictly Come Dancing. She was partnered with professional dancer Ian Waite and, in the first few weeks scored the highest number of points from the judges. She eventually reached the final and was runner-up to actress Jill Halfpenny. After that, Lewis and the two other partners from the final danced at the Royal Variety Performance.

Ten days after competing in the Strictly Come Dancing final, Lewis and Waite competed again in the Strictly Come Dancing Champion of Champions Special, in which finalists from the first two series competed against each other. Lewis received the most points from the judges, but again was runner-up to Halfpenny. She then appeared on the 2016 Strictly Come Dancing Christmas Special, partnered with Anton du Beke.

=== TV guest appearances ===
- Let's Dance for Comic Relief (2009) – Contestant
- All Star Family Fortunes (2009)
- Pointless with her father-in-law, Tom O'Connor (2011)
- The Cube on ITV (2012)
- Your Face Sounds Familiar (2013)
- Big Star's Little Star with her son Ryan (2014)
- Give a Pet a Home (2015)
- Sport Relief in a sketch with Idris Elba playing Luther (2016)
- The Chase: Celebrity Special (2017)
- Hairy Bikers Home for Christmas (2017)
- All Star Musicals (2017) – Contestant
- Would I Lie to You? (2018)
- The Masked Dancer (2022) – Contestant / "Sea Slug"

== Personal life ==
Born on 27 August 1972 in West Bromwich, to Jamaican-born parents, Lewis grew up in Pendeford, Wolverhampton, and was educated at the Regis School in Tettenhall, which later became the King's School. A £1 million sports hall was later built there and named in her honour.

From the late 1990s until 2005, Lewis was in a relationship with Belgian sprinter Patrick Stevens, and they had a daughter. In 2006, Lewis married Steve Finan O'Connor, former manager of the UK pop group All Saints, former manager of Liam Payne, and son of comedian Tom O'Connor. They have three sons together and separated after seventeen-years of marriage. Lewis was hospitalised with sepsis and was fitted with a stent following her fiftieth birthday party.

== See also ==
- List of Olympic medalists in athletics (women)
- List of World Athletics Championships medalists (women)
- List of Commonwealth Games medallists in athletics (women)
- List of European Athletics Championships medalists (women)
- List of 1996 Summer Olympics medal winners
- List of 2000 Summer Olympics medal winners
- List of high jump national champions (women)
- List of people from Wolverhampton
- British African-Caribbean people
- Great Britain and Northern Ireland at the World Athletics Championships
- List of celebrities appearing on Daily Cooks Challenge

Sporting positions
Preceded by Sabine Braun	Women's Heptathlon Best Year Performance; 1998	Succeeded by Eunice Barber
