= Michelle Dunkley =

English female athlete

Personal information
- Nationality: British (English)
- Born: 26 January 1978 (age 47) Kettering, England

Sport
- Sport: Athletics
- Event: high jump
- Club: Essex Ladies AC

Michelle Lisa Dunkley (born 26 January 1978) is an English female former athlete who competed in the high jump. She has a personal best performance of 1.94 metres.

== Biography ==
Dunkley who began her career at Kettering Town Harriers, achieved eighth place at the 1996 World Junior Championships in Sydney, Australia. She represented England in the high jump metres event just missed a bronze medal by finishing 4th, at the 1998 Commonwealth Games in Kuala Lumpur, Malaysia.

She has won two British indoor titles in 1996 and 1999 and was the sole British junior indoor record holder for 18 years until her mark of 1.89 metres was matched by Morgan Lake in 2015.

Dunkley also finished on the podium for five consecutive years at the AAA Championships from 1997 to 2001.
