= Clova Court =

English athlete (born 1960)

Clova Court née Cameron
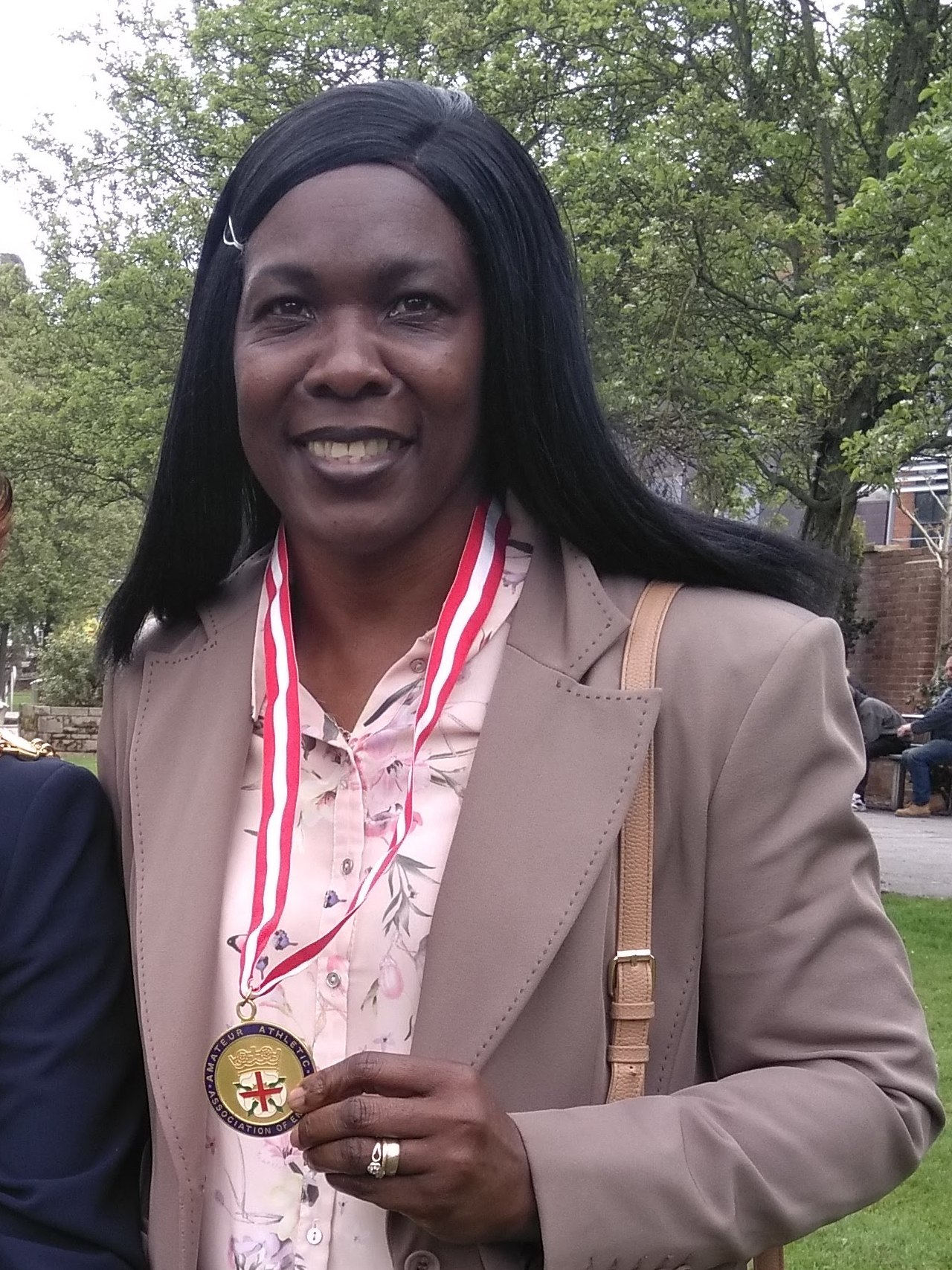
- Court in April 2022

Personal information
- Nationality: British/Jamaican
- Born: 10 February 1960 (age 66) Saint Catherine Parish, Jamaica
- Height: 175 cm (5 ft 9 in)
- Weight: 72 kg (159 lb)

Sport
- Sport: Athletics
- Event: heptathlon
- Club: Birchfield Harriers

Clova E. Court (née Cameron; born 10 February 1960) is a British/Jamaican retired athlete, who competed mainly in the heptathlon and the 100 metres hurdles. She represented Great Britain in the heptathlon at the 1992 Olympic Games in Barcelona. She won a record five AAA Championships heptathlon tiles, and also won the 1994 AAA Championships 100 metres hurdles title, defeating Sally Gunnell.

== Biography ==
Born in Saint Catherine Parish, Jamaica, Court competed for Great Britain at several major championships during the 1990s. Her first individual international vest was at the age of 30. She finished sixteenth at the 1991 World Championships with a personal best score of 6022 points, ninth at the 1992 European Indoor Championships, nineteenth at the 1992 Summer Olympics and eighth at the 1998 Commonwealth Games.

Court also competed in hurdling, and reached the semifinals at the 1993 World Indoor Championships and the 1993 World Championships. Her personal best time was 13.04 seconds, achieved at the 1994 European Championships in Helsinki. She made the final at the 1994 Commonwealth Games, but did not finish the race. In all, Court competed in 12 major events, on two occasions doubling up in both the heptathlon and 100m hurdles, and five European cups.

Court represented Great Britain at international level in a number of different disciplines: heptathlon, 100 m hurdles, 200 metres, Javelin throw, Long jump, sprint relay team, plus indoor 60 m hurdles, pentathlon, and 4 × 200 m relay team. In total, she made 57 appearances for the United Kingdom. She is one of the few former Olympians who has captained a British team, and then gone on to manage and coach a British team.

== International competitions ==
Year	Competition	Venue	Position	Event	Notes
Representing Great Britain / England
1990	European Championships	Split, Yugoslavia	16th	heptathlon	5068
1991	World Championships	Tokyo, Japan	16th	heptathlon	6022
1992	European Indoor Championships	Genoa, Italy	9th	pentathlon	3922
1992	Olympic Games	Barcelona, Spain	19th	heptathlon	5994
1993	World Indoor Championships	Toronto, Canada	semifinal	60 m hurdles	8.65 (8.33 in heat)
1993	World Championships	Stuttgart, Germany	semifinal	100 m hurdles	13.37
1993	World Championships	Stuttgart, Germany	DNF	heptathlon	1030
1994	European Championships	Helsinki, Finland	semifinal	100 m hurdles	13.04
1994	Commonwealth Games	Victoria, Canada	DNF (final)	100 m hurdles	13.27 (heats)
1994	Commonwealth Games	Victoria, Canada	DNF	heptathlon	
1998	Commonwealth Games	Kuala Lumpur, Malaysia	8th	heptathlon	5421

5 EUROPEAN CUP TEAM CHAMPIONSHIPS 1991/1992/1993/1997/1998 winning individual title in 1993 and 4th place in 1993

== National titles ==
- 5 AAA Championships heptathlon titles (1991, 1992, 1993, 1997 & 1998)
- 1 AAAs Championship 100 metres hurdles title (1994)
- 2 AAAs Indoor Championship 60 metres hurdles titles (1993 & 1995)
- 2 inter counties titles 1987 & 1997
- British athletics federation indoor champion 60m hurdles 1996
