= 1990 UK Athletics Championships =

British athletics event

- Dates: 2 & 3 June 1990
- Host city: Cardiff, Wales
- Venue: Cardiff Athletics Stadium
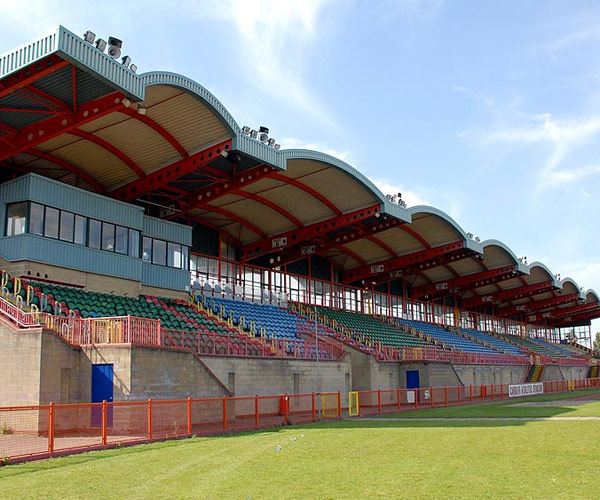
- Level: Senior
- Type: Outdoor

The 1990 UK Athletics Championships sponsored by Pearl Assurance, was the national championship in outdoor track and field for the United Kingdom held at Cardiff Athletics Stadium, Cardiff. It was the first time that the event was held in the Welsh capital.

It was the fourteenth edition of the competition limited to British athletes only, launched as an alternative to the AAA Championships, which was open to foreign competitors. However, because the calibre of national competition remained greater at the AAA event, the UK Championships this year were not considered the principal national championship event by some statisticians, such as the National Union of Track Statisticians (NUTS). Many of the athletes below also competed at the 1990 AAA Championships.

== Summary ==
Strong winds affected several of the sprint races and jumps on the programme. A women's triple jump was contested for the first time.

Racewalker Ian McCombie and javelin thrower Steve Backley both won a third straight UK title at the event. Other men to defend titles that year were Colin Jackson (110 m hurdles), Paul Edwards (shot put) and Paul Head (hammer throw). Three women repeated their 1989 victories: Kay Morley (100 m hurdles), Jackie McKernan (discus) and Sharon Gibson (javelin).Myrtle Augee defeated Judy Oakes in the women's shot put to break her rival's winning streak dating back to 1984. No athletes won multiple titles in Cardiff, though champions Sallyanne Short, Phylis Smith, Alison Wyeth and Michelle Griffith all reached the podium in two events.

The main international track and field competition for the United Kingdom that year was the 1990 European Athletics Championships. Britain's men had a highly successful performance there, with Linford Christie, Roger Black, Colin Jackson, Kriss Akabusi, and Steve Backley all going from UK champion to European champion. The 800 m UK champion David Sharpe was also a silver medallist behind his teammate Tom McKean. The four countries of the United Kingdom competed separately at the Commonwealth Games that year as well. UK champions Christie, Akabusi, Backley, Diane Edwards and Myrtle Augee all won gold for England, while Jackson and Morley made it a men's and women's sprint hurdles double for Wales.

== Medals ==
=== Men ===
Event	Gold		Silver		Bronze	
100m (wind: +2.2 m/s)	Linford Christie	10.13 w	Jason Livingston	10.31 w	(Scotland) Dave Clark	10.39 w
200m	Ade Mafe	21.13	(Scotland) Dave Clark	21.14	Michael Rosswess	21.26
400m	Roger Black	45.63	Paul Sanders	46.75	Mark Richardson	46.88
800m	David Sharpe	1:51.46	Martin Steele	1:51.63	Kevin McKay	1:51.63
1,500m	(Wales) Neil Horsfield	3:48.39	Rob Whalley	3:49.07	Andrew Geddes	3:49.18
3,000m	Geoff Turnbull	8:11.35	Robert Denmark	8:11.90	(Scotland) Tom Hanlon	8:12.71
5,000m	Simon Mugglestone	13:43.7	Jon Richards	13:46.3	Deon McNeilly	13:47.7
110m hurdles	(Wales) Colin Jackson	13.10	David Nelson	13.62	(Wales) Nigel Walker	13.77
400m hurdles	Kriss Akabusi	51.50	Philip Harries	52.49	Martin Briggs	53.03
3000m steeplechase	Ken Penney	8:50.90	Tom Buckner	8:54.84	Spencer Newport	8:56.55
10,000m walk	Ian McCombie	41:16.00	Mark Easton	41:35.39	Andrew Penn	44:10.67
high jump	Dalton Grant	2.25 m	(Scotland) Geoff Parsons	2.20 m	Brendan Reilly	2.20 m
pole vault	Andy Ashurst	5.30 m	Mike Edwards	5.20 m	Dean Mellor	5.00 m
long jump	Kevin Liddington	7.62 m	Wayne Griffith	7.58w m	John Shepherd	7.50 m
triple jump	Francis Agyepong	16.06 m	Jonathan Edwards	15.49 m	Joe Sweeney	15.22 m
shot put	(Wales) Paul Edwards	18.57 m	Matt Simson	18.52 m	(Scotland) Steve Whyte	17.24 m
discus throw	Paul Mardle	57.02 m	Abi Ekoku	56.46 m	Steve Casey	54.46 m
hammer throw	Paul Head	71.64 m	Mick Jones	68.24 m	Jason Byrne	67.98 m
javelin throw	Steve Backley	88.46 m	Myles Cottrell	72.54 m	Gary Jenson	72.20 m

=== Women ===
Event	Gold		Silver		Bronze	
100m (wind: +4.6 m/s)	(Wales) Sallyanne Short	11.36 w	Phylis Smith	11.40 w	(Wales) Helen Miles	11.45 w
200m (wind: +2.6 m/s)	Phylis Smith	23.97 w	Louise Stuart	24.00 w	(Wales) Sallyanne Short	24.04 w
400m	Diane Edwards	54.32	Sandra Douglas	55.02	Pat Beckford	55.49
800m	Helen Thorpe	2:05.52	Mary Kitson	2:06.10	Sally Wheeler	2:07.36
1,500m	Alison Wyeth	4:20.40	Lisa York	4:21.04	Debbie Gunning	4:21.24
3,000m	Andrea Wallace	9:08.1	Sonia McGeorge	9:08.7	Alison Wyeth	9:08.9
100m hurdles (wind: +4.6 m/s)	(Wales) Kay Morley	13.16 w	Sam Farquharson	13.33 w	Wendy Jeal	13.40 w
400m hurdles	Clare Sugden	57.52	Gowry Retchakan	58.23	(Scotland) Julie Vine	59.82
5000m walk	Betty Sworowski	22:31.59	Lisa Langford	22:42.47	Julie Drake	23:03.24
high jump	Julia Bennett	1.84 m	Debbie Marti	1.81 m	Louise Gittens	1.78 m
long jump	Mary Berkeley	6.17 m	Joanne Wise	6.08 m	Michelle Griffith	5.90 m
triple jump	Michelle Griffith	12.94 m w	Evette Finikin	12.87 m w	(Scotland) Karen Hambrook	11.82 m w
shot put	Myrtle Augee	19.03 m	Judy Oakes	18.77 m	Yvonne Hanson-Nortey	16.09 m
discus throw	(Northern Ireland) Jackie McKernan	55.36 m	Janette Picton	52.64 m	Sharon Andrews	52.60 m
javelin throw	Sharon Gibson	58.32 m	Mandy Liverton	57.84 m	Fatima Whitbread	51.50 m
