= 1994 AAA Championships =

- Dates: 11–12 June
- Host city: Sheffield, England
- Venue: Don Valley Stadium
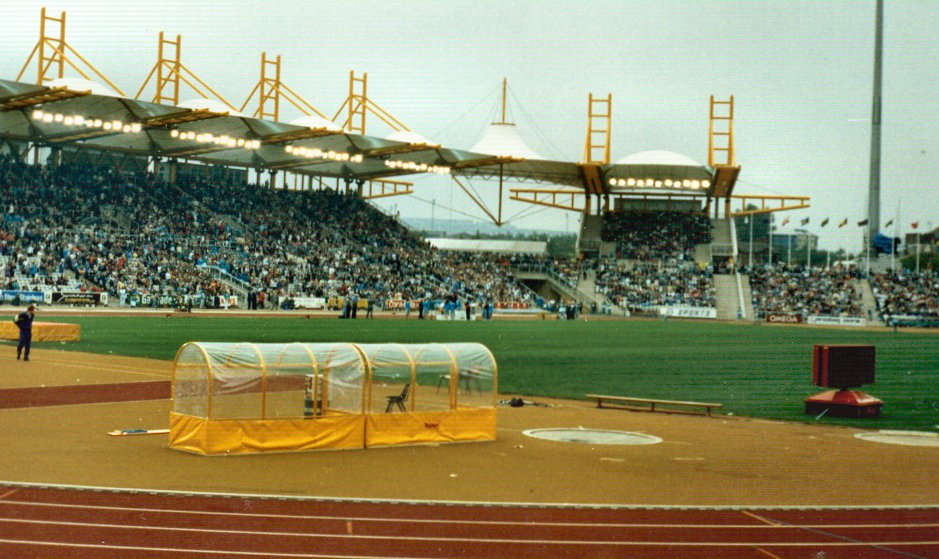
- Level: Senior
- Type: Outdoor

The 1994 AAA Championships sponsored by KP, was an outdoor track and field competition organised by the Amateur Athletic Association (AAA), held from 11 to 12 June at Don Valley Stadium in Sheffield, England. The event doubled as the qualifiers for the 1994 European Athletics Championships.

It was the first and only time that the AAA Championships was held at the Don Valley Stadiume. It was considered the de facto national championships for the United Kingdom.

Many top British athletes were absent from the competition.

== Medal summary ==
=== Men ===
Event	Gold		Silver		Bronze	
100m (wind: +3.9 m/s)	Linford Christie	9.91 w	Toby Box	10.07 w	Michael Rosswess	10.07 w
200m (wind: +3.2 m/s)	Solomon Wariso	20.67 w	Phil Goedluck	20.83 w	(Scotland) Dougie Walker	20.85 w
400m	Roger Black	44.94	Du'aine Ladejo	45.36	(Scotland) Brian Whittle	45.46
800m	Craig Winrow	1:48.45	(Kenya) Vincent Malakwen	1:48.65	Martin Steele	1:48.68
1,500m	Kevin McKay	3:40.59	(Scotland) David Maxwell Strang	3:40.85	(Northern Ireland) Gary Lough	3:41.71
3,000m	Bashir Hussain	8:19.28	David Tune	8:30.17	Mick Morris	8:37.80
5,000m	(Northern Ireland) Dermot Donnelly	13:52.63	Darren Mead	13:54.08	Richard Findlow	13:55.75
10,000m	Rob Denmark	28:03.34	Martin Jones	28:33.18	Justin Hobbs	28:45.86
110m hurdles	Andy Tulloch	13.70	(Wales) Paul Gray	13.76	Lloyd Cowan	14.09
400m hurdles	Peter Crampton	49.82	Steve Coupland	50.19	Noel Levy	50.89
3000m steeplechase	(Wales) Justin Chaston	8:28.28	Spencer Duval	8:28.33	Colin Walker	8:29.65
10,000m walk	Darrell Stone	43:09.28	Mark Easton	44:06.93	(Republic of Ireland) Michael Casey	45:24.83
high jump	Brendan Reilly	2.24 m	(Scotland) Geoff Parsons	2.20 m	(Republic of Ireland) Antoine Burke	2.15 m
pole vault	Andy Ashurst	5.30 m	Mike Edwards Kevin Hughes	5.20 m	Not awarded	
long jump	Barrington Williams	7.77 m	Fred Salle	7.60 m	Michael Morgan	7.59 m
triple jump	Jonathan Edwards	17.39 m	Julian Golley	16.98 m	Francis Agyepong	16.95 m
shot put	(Wales) Paul Edwards	18.32 m	(Australia) John McNamara	17.16 m	(Wales) Lee Newman	17.02 m
discus throw	Kevin Brown	58.60 m	Robert Weir	57.94 m	Glen Smith	56.22 m
hammer throw	Peter Vivian	70.80 m	Paul Head	69.08 m	Mick Jones	67.42 m
javelin throw	Mick Hill	84.60 m	Steve Backley	84.24 m	Colin Mackenzie	79.16 m
decathlon	Barry Thomas	7458 pts	David Bigham	7434 pts	Andy Lewis	7221 pts

=== Women ===
Event	Gold		Silver		Bronze	
100m (wind: +2.9 m/s)	Katharine Merry	11.27 w	Stephi Douglas	11.35 w	Simmone Jacobs	11.37 w
200m	Katharine Merry	22.85	Stephi Douglas	23.17	Paula Thomas	23.33
400m	(Scotland) Melanie Neef	52.56	Tracy Goddard	53.59	Sandra Douglas	53.78
800m	Diane Modahl	2:01.35	Dawn Gandy	2:03.75	Sonya Bowyer	2:03.79
1,500m	Kelly Holmes	4:01.41	(Scotland) Yvonne Murray	4:01.44	Ann Griffiths	4:08.71
3,000m	Sonia McGeorge	9:03.80	(Scotland) Laura Adam	9:12.16	Wendy Ore	9:14.72
5,000m	Shireen Barbour	16:06.49	Sarah Bentley	16:16.86	Amanda Wright	16:22.95
10,000m	Zahara Hyde	33:23.25	Carol Greenwood	33:34.96	Suzanne Rigg	33:42.80
100m hurdles	Clova Court	13.06	Sally Gunnell	13.09	Lesley-Ann Skeete	13.43
400m hurdles	Gowry Retchakan	57.08	Jacqui Parker	57.31	Stephanie McCann	58.09
5,000m walk	(Scotland) Verity Snook	23:22.52	Vicky Lupton	23:34.50	(Australia) Jane Barbour	23:43.23
10,000m walk	(Scotland) Verity Snook	48:05	(Isle of Man) Cal Partington	48:20	Melanie Wright	49:16
high jump	Julia Bennett	1.89 m	Debbie Marti	1.86 m	Julie Major	1.83 m
pole vault	Kate Staples	3.65 m	Paula Wilson	3.40 m	Linda Stanton	3.30 m
long jump	Yinka Idowu	6.58 m w	Denise Lewis	6.56 m	Ann Brooks	6.10 m
triple jump	Michelle Griffith	14.08 m	Ashia Hansen	13.79 m	Rachel Kirby	13.29 m
shot put	Judy Oakes	18.38 m	Myrtle Augee	17.37 m	Maggie Lynes	16.53 m
discus throw	(Northern Ireland) Jackie McKernan	56.94 m	Sharon Andrews	56.24 m	Debbie Callaway	54.94 m
hammer throw	Lorraine Shaw	59.58 m	Diana Holden	49.12 m	Sarah Moore	48.46 m
javelin throw	Shelley Holroyd	57.08 m	Sharon Gibson	56.90 m	(Scotland) Karen Costello	54.50 m
heptathlon	Vikki Schofield	5587 pts	Pauline Richards	5420 pts	Uju Efobi	5409 pts

== Other AAA titles ==
Event	Gold		Silver		Bronze	
men's marathon	(Mexico) Dionicio Cerón	2:08:53	(Ethiopia) Abebe Mekonnen	2:09:17	(Mexico) Germán Silva	2:09:18
Women's marathon	(Germany) Katrin Dörre	2:32:34	(Australia) Lisa Ondieki	2:33:17	(Brazil) Janete Mayal	2:34:21

- + AAA marathon title determined by 1994 London Marathon placings
