= 1988 UK Athletics Championships =

British

- Dates: 4 & 5 June 1988
- Host city: Derby, England
- Venue: Moorways Stadium
- Level: Senior
- Type: Outdoor

The 1988 UK Athletics Championships sponsored by HFC Bank, was the national championship in outdoor track and field for the United Kingdom held at Moorways Stadium, Derby. It was the second time that the English city hosted the event, continuing on from the 1987 UK Championships.

It was the twelfth edition of the competition limited to British athletes only, launched as an alternative to the AAA Championships, which was open to foreign competitors. However, because the calibre of national competition remained greater at the AAA event, the UK Championships this year were not considered the principal national championship event by some statisticians, such as the National Union of Track Statisticians (NUTS). Many of the athletes below also competed at the 1988 AAA Championships.

== Summary ==
Fatima Whitbread won her eighth consecutive women's javelin throw UK title, while shot putter Judy Oakes won a fifth straight title. Diana Davies extended her winning streak to three in the women's high jump and Paula Dunn repeated her sprint double of 1987. Three men defended their 1987 titles: Tony Jarrett (110 m hurdles), Paul Mardle (discus) and Dave Smith (hammer). Elaine McLaughlin (400 m hurdles) and Mary Berkeley (long jump) were the other women to retain their titles.

The main international track and field competition for the United Kingdom that year was the Olympic Games. Three UK champions went on to win Olympic silver in Seoul: Linford Christie, Liz McColgan and Fatima Whitbread. Colin Jackson only ran the 100 m at the UK Championships, but took a silver in his hurdles speciality at the Olympics.

== Medals ==
=== Men ===
Event	Gold		Silver		Bronze	
100m	John Regis	10.65	(Scotland) Jamie Henderson	10.67	(Wales) Colin Jackson	10.69
200m	200m Linford Christie	20.75	Donovan Reid	21.08	Andy Carrott	21.10
400m	(Scotland) Brian Whittle	46.08	Paul Sanders	46.85	Mark Morris	46.96
800m	Paul Herbert	1:45.64	Steve Crabb	1:45.81	Steve Heard	1:46.86
1,500m	Richard McDonnell	3:48.02	Mark Kirk	3:48.59	Graeme Saker	3:48.82
5,000m	Mark Harris	13:50.61	Jeremy Barton	13:52.46	Andy Bristow	13:52.96
10,000m	David Lewis	28:08.44	Mark Dalloway	28:09.39	Gary Staines	28:12.93
110m hurdles	Tony Jarrett	13.97	Jon Ridgeon	14.20	Hughie Teape	14.31
400m hurdles	Philip Harries	50.01	Martin Briggs	50.65	Trevor Burton	51.13
3000m steeplechase	Neil Smart	8:37.37	Peter McColgan	8:37.52	Dave Baptiste	8:39.77
10,000m walk	Ian McCombie	40:39.77	Andi Drake	41:18.64	Darrell Stone	42:26.79
high jump	(Scotland) Geoff Parsons	2.25 m	Dalton Grant	2.20 m	Henderson Pierre	2.15 m
pole vault	Andy Ashurst	5.10 m	Mark Johnson	5.00 m	Mike Edwards Keith Stock	4.80 m
long jump	Derrick Brown	7.91w m	Mark Forsythe	7.83w m	Paul Johnson	7.82w m
triple jump	Rez Cameron	16.20 m	Femi Abejide	15.86 m	Wayne Green	15.86 m
shot put	Graham Savory	17.95 m	(Wales) Paul Edwards	17.13 m	Carl Jennings	17.12 m
discus throw	Paul Mardle	59.42 m	Peter Gordon	56.32 m	Gary Herrington	53.32 m
hammer throw	Dave Smith	70.66 m	Paul Head	67.40 m	Mick Jones	66.80 m
javelin throw	Steve Backley	79.50 m	Mark Roberson	75.04 m	Gary Jenson	74.70 m

=== Women ===
Event	Gold		Silver		Bronze	
100m	Paula Dunn	11.49	Mary Berkeley	11.76	(Wales) Sallyanne Short	11.82
200m	Paula Dunn	23.46	Simmone Jacobs	23.81	Louise Stuart	23.83
400m	Linda Keough	52.25	Angela Piggford	53.85	Helen Burkart	54.21
800m	Christina Cahill	2:02.71	(Wales) Kirsty Wade	2:02.84	Dawn Gandy	2:03.69
1,500m	Bev Nicholson	4:15.13	Shireen Bailey	4:16.23	Karen Hutcheson	4:17.04
3,000m	Melissa Watson	9:04.85	Jill Hunter	9:05.13	Nicky Morris	9:05.88
5,000m	(Scotland) Liz McColgan	15:10.17	(Wales) Angela Tooby	15:17.89	Jane Shields	15:32.34
100m hurdles	Lynne Green	13.71	Debbie Baker	13.83	(Wales) Kay Morley	13.83
400m hurdles	(Northern Ireland) Elaine McLaughlin	56.22	Simone Laidlow	57.66	Jennie Pearson	57.93
5000m walk	Betty Sworowski	24:03.38	Julie Drake	24:17.86	Nicky Jackson	24:19.41
high jump	Diana Davies	1.88 m	Kerry Roberts	1.85 m	Claire Summerfield	1.80 m
long jump	Mary Berkeley	6.53 m	Beverly Kinch	6.32 m	Diana Davies	6.17 m
shot put	Judy Oakes	18.76 m	Yvonne Hanson-Nortey	16.14 m	Maggie Lynes	15.67 m
discus throw	(Wales) Venissa Head	53.66 m	Karen Pugh	53.08 m	(Northern Ireland) Jackie McKernan	51.50 m
javelin throw	Fatima Whitbread	70.10 m	Sharon Gibson	59.90 m	Mandy Liverton	53.08 m
