= 1981 UK Athletics Championships =

British athletics championship

- Dates: 24 & 25 May 1981
- Host city: Antrim, Northern Ireland
- Venue: Antrim Stadium
- Level: Senior
- Type: Outdoor

The 1981 UK Athletics Championships was the national championship in outdoor track and field for the United Kingdom held at Antrim Stadium, Antrim. It was the first time that a national track and field championship was held in Northern Ireland.

It was the fifth edition of the competition limited to British athletes only, launched as an alternative to the AAA Championships, which was open to foreign competitors. However, because the calibre of national competition remained greater at the AAA event, the UK Championships this year were not considered the principal national championship event by some statisticians, such as the National Union of Track Statisticians (NUTS). Many of the athletes below also competed at the 1981 AAA Championships.

== Summary ==
David Ottley won his fourth straight title in the men's javelin throw. Among the athletes to defend their 1980 UK titles were Cameron Sharp (men's 100 metres), Carol Tyson (race walk) and Louise Miller (high jump). Three athletes won UK title doubles, all of them women: Linsey MacDonald won the short sprint double, Gillian Dainty took both middle-distance titles, while Venissa Head was both shot put and discus throw champion.

The main international track and field competition for the United Kingdom that year was the 1981 European Cup. Reflecting the secondary status of the UK event at national level, none of the British individual medallists there were present at UK Championships, though all members of the medal-winning women's 4 × 400 metres relay reached the podium in Antrim (Linda Forsyth, Michelle Scutt, Verona Elder and Joslyn Hoyte-Smith).

== Medals ==
=== Men ===
Event	Gold		Silver		Bronze	
100m	(Scotland) Cameron Sharp	10.86	Earl Tulloch	10.90	Jim Evans	11.07
200m	Earl Tulloch	20.84	(Scotland) Cameron Sharp	21.21	Nigel Richens	21.40
400m	Steve Scutt	46.52	Paul Dunn	47.87	Brian Jones	47.99
800m	Rob Harrison	1:48:35	John Goodacre	1:48.89	Peter Elliott	1:49.19
1,500m	Steve Ovett	3:42.80	(Scotland) Frank Clement	3:44.10	Jack Buckner	3:44.22
5,000m	Dave Clarke	13:36.13	Steve Binns	13:42.28	Steve Emson	13:57.94
10,000m	Dave Black	29:09.09	Glyn Harvey	29:14.21	(Scotland) Lawrie Spence	29:15.50
110m hurdles	Kieran Moore	15.02	Phil Barthropp	15.08	Gary Myles	15.08
400m hurdles	Bill Hartley	51.58	Steve Sole	52.33	Howard Moscrop	52.41
3000m steeplechase	Kevin Capper	8:43.99	Trevor Fieldsend	8:46.15	Paul Bettridge	8:46.73
10,000m walk	Steve Barry	42:32.43	Roger Mills	43:46.16	Gordon Vale	43:52.52
high jump	(Scotland) Brian Burgess	2.15 m	Ossie Cham	2.10 m	Floyd Manderson	2.10 m
pole vault	(Scotland) Graham Eggleton	4.80 m	Mike Bull	4.80 m	Billy Davey	4.40 m
long jump	Colin Rattigan	7.49 m w	Derrick Williams	7.22 m	John King	7.18 m
triple jump	Gary Gallagher	15.46 m	Joe Allison	15.11 m	Stephen Metcalfe	15.03 m
shot put	Simon Rodhouse	17.73 m	Ian Lindley	17.58 m	Mike Atkinson	15.13 m
discus throw	Peter Gordon	52.06 m	(Scotland) Paul Mardle	50.86 m	(Scotland) Colin Sutherland	50.32 m
hammer throw	Martin Girvan	69.50 m	Ron James	64.58 m	Ian Chipchase	61.74 m
javelin throw	David Ottley	82.84 m	Roald Bradstock	75.56 m	Richard Hooper	69.66 m

=== Women ===
Event	Gold		Silver		Bronze	
100m	(Scotland) Linsey MacDonald	12.20	Pippa Baker	12.38	Debra Warner	12.46
200m	(Scotland) Linsey MacDonald	23.97	Verona Elder	24.21	Debra Warner	24.42
400m	Joslyn Hoyte-Smith	52.33	Michelle Scutt	52.34	Linda Forsyth	53.47
800m	Gillian Dainty	2:08.12	(Scotland) Karen Ford	2:08.71	Lorraine Baker	2:08.86
1,500m	Gillian Dainty	4:21.39	Karen Hughes	4:22.25	Sandra Arthurton	4:23.70
3,000m	Ruth Smeeth	9:00.36	Jane Furniss	9:03.14	(Wales) Hilary Hollick	9:05.03
100m hurdles	Manndy Laing	14.20	(Scotland) Elaine McMaster	14.43	Jill Duffield	14.59
400m hurdles	Wendy Griffiths	58.51	Susan Morley	59.74	(Scotland) Margaret Southerden	60.17
5,000m walk	Carol Tyson	24:09.89	Lillian Millen	24:32.09	Elaine Cox	25:18.98
High jump	Louise Miller	1.89 m	Ann-Marie Cording	1.86 m	Sharon McPeake	1.83 m
Long jump	Sandra Green	6.17 m w	(Scotland) Karen Glen	6.08 m w	Beverly Kinch	6.02 m
Shot put	(Wales) Venissa Head	17.62 m	Caroline Dyer	14.03 m	Helen Clarke	13.16 m
Discus throw	(Wales) Venissa Head	45.20 m	(Northern Ireland) Jackie McKernan	37.18 m	Laurian Hanna	33.14 m
Javelin	Fatima Whitbread	56.10 m	(Wales) Jacqueline Zaslona	51.16 m	Janeen Williams	50.74 m
