= 1990 AAA Championships =

- Dates: 3–4 August
- Host city: Birmingham, England
- Venue: Alexander Stadium
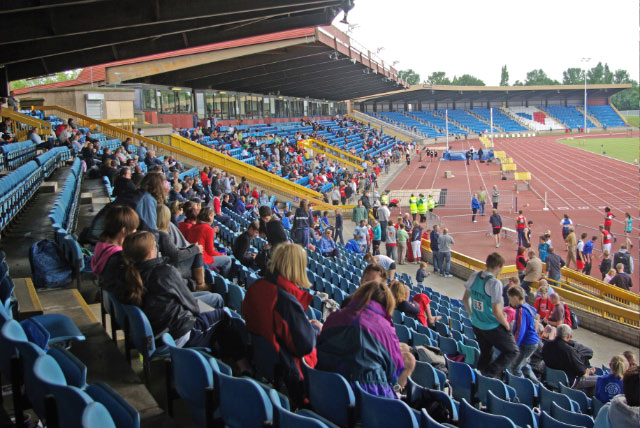
- Level: Senior
- Type: Outdoor

The 1990 AAA Championships sponsored by Panasonic, was an outdoor track and field competition organised by the Amateur Athletic Association (AAA), held from 3–4 August at Alexander Stadium in Birmingham, England. It also served as the 1990 European Championship trials.

It was considered the de facto national championships for the United Kingdom, ahead of the 1990 UK Athletics Championships.

== Medal summary ==
=== Men ===
Event	Gold		Silver		Bronze	
100m (wind: +2.5 m/s)	(United States) Calvin Smith	10.21 w	Linford Christie	10.21 w	Darren Braithwaite	10.25 w
200m	John Regis	20.28	(Nigeria) Olapade Adeniken	20.37	Roger Black (Australia) Dean Capobianco	20.60
400m	(Jamaica) Howard Burnett	45.52	(Trinidad and Tobago) Alvin Daniel	45.64	(Australia) Darren Clark	46.11
800m	(Kenya) William Tanui	1:44.14	(Scotland) Tom McKean	1:44.44	(Kenya) Robert Kibet	1:45.73
1,500m	(Wales) Neil Horsfield	3:44.70	Gary Marlow	3:46.66	Steve Crabb	3:47.10
3,000m	(New Zealand) John Walker	8:05.01	Matthew Clarkson	8:06.22	Colin Ridding	8:07.01
5,000m	Eamonn Martin	13:32.07	(Kenya) Elisah Songok	13:34.60	Gary Staines	13:36.11
10,000m	Richard Nerurkar	28:05.16	Colin Moore	28:13.13	Paul Davies-Hale	28:24.46
110m hurdles	(Wales) Colin Jackson	13.23	Tony Jarrett	13.30	(Wales) Nigel Walker	13.51
400m hurdles	(United States) Nat Page	50.06	Max Robertson	50.22	(Australia) Leigh Miller	50.95
3000m steeplechase	(Kenya) Philip Barkutwo	8:22.22	(Scotland) Tom Hanlon	8:22.60	Colin Walker	8:27.15
10,000m walk	Mark Easton	41:32.80	Andi Drake	41:40.84	Sean Martindale	41:49.16
high jump	Dalton Grant	2.28 m	(Australia) Tim Forsyth	2.21 m	(New Zealand) Roger Te Puni	2.18 m
pole vault	(United States) Paul Benavides	5.30 m	Mike Edwards	5.25 m	(United States) Terry Womack	5.20 m
long jump	Stewart Faulkner	8.05 m	(Northern Ireland) Mark Forsythe	7.90 m	(Australia) Dave Culbert	7.85 m
triple jump	John Herbert	16.61 m	Jonathan Edwards	16.51 m	Vernon Samuels	16.50 m
shot put	(Wales) Paul Edwards	19.00 m	Simon Williams	17.80 m	(Kenya) Robert Walikhe	17.41 m
discus throw	Abi Ekoku	57.58 m	Simon Williams	55.76 m	Kevin Brown	54.26 m
hammer throw	Paul Head	72.68 m	Mick Jones	70.38 m	Jason Byrne	68.60 m
javelin throw	Mick Hill	81.22 m	Gary Jenson	74.18 m	Roald Bradstock	74.18 m
decathlon	Brian Taylor	7567 pts	Mark Bishop	7516 pts	Rob Laing	6958 pts

=== Women ===
Event	Gold		Silver		Bronze	
100m (wind: +2.5 m/s)	Stephi Douglas	11.38 w	Paula Thomas	11.43 w	Beverly Kinch	11.44 w
200m	Jennifer Stoute	23.07	Louise Stuart	23.36	(Wales) Sallyanne Short	23.41
400m	(United States) Lillie Leatherwood	51.62	Linda Keough	51.77	(Australia) Susan Andrews	52.49
800m	Ann Williams	2:03.45	(Republic of Ireland) Aisling Molloy	2:03.85	Lorraine Baker	2:04.65
1,500m	Christina Cahill	4:12.54	Teena Colebrook	4:12.83	Bev Nicholson	4:14.55
3,000m	(Scotland) Yvonne Murray	8:48.21	(Republic of Ireland) Sonia O'Sullivan	8:53.15	Alison Wyeth	8:54.45
5,000m	Sally Ellis	16:45.54	Jill Harrison	17:12.11	Alison Barnes	17:14.00
10,000m	Andrea Wallace	32:51.17	Julie Holland	32:55.77	Angie Hulley	33:01.31
100m hurdles	Lesley-Ann Skeete	13.03	(Wales) Kay Morley	13.05	Jacqui Agyepong	13.17
400m hurdles	Gowry Retchakan	57.14	Jacqui Parker	57.43	Clare Sugden	59.40
5,000m walk	Betty Sworowski	22:23.35	Helen Elleker	23:26.86	(Scotland) Verity Larby	23:46.68
10,000m walk	Vicky Lupton	48:12.2	Helen Elleker	48:58.9	(Scotland) Verity Larby	51:56.0
high jump	Lea Haggett	1.88 m	Kerry Roberts	1.83 m	(Northern Ireland) Janet Boyle	1.83 m
long jump	Fiona May	6.66 m	Mary Berkeley	6.57 m	(Republic of Ireland) Terri Horgan	6.17 m
triple jump	Evette Finikin	12.49 m w	(Scotland) Karen Hambrook	12.16 m	Julie Webster	10.78 m
shot put	Judy Oakes	18.63 m	Myrtle Augee	17.91 m	Yvonne Hanson-Nortey	15.83 m
discus throw	(Australia) Lisa-Marie Vizaniari	57.22 m	(Northern Ireland) Jackie McKernan	55.48 m	Janette Picton	51.14 m
javelin throw	Tessa Sanderson	58.42 m	Sharon Gibson	52.94 m	Caroline White	52.70 m
heptathlon	Joanne Mulliner	5679 pts w	Clova Court	5548 pts	Jenny Kelly	5516 pts

== Other AAA titles ==
Event	Gold		Silver		Bronze	
marathon	Allister Hutton	2:10:10	(Italy) Salvatore Bettiol	2:10:40	(Spain) Juan Francisco Romera	2:10:48
marathon	Nicola McCracken	2:33:07	Sally Eastall	2:34:31	(Scotland) Sheila Catford	2:36:42

- + AAA marathon champion determined by 1990 London Marathon placings
