= 1993 UK Athletics Championships =

- Dates: 11 & 12 June 1993
- Host city: London, England
- Venue: Crystal Palace Athletics Stadium
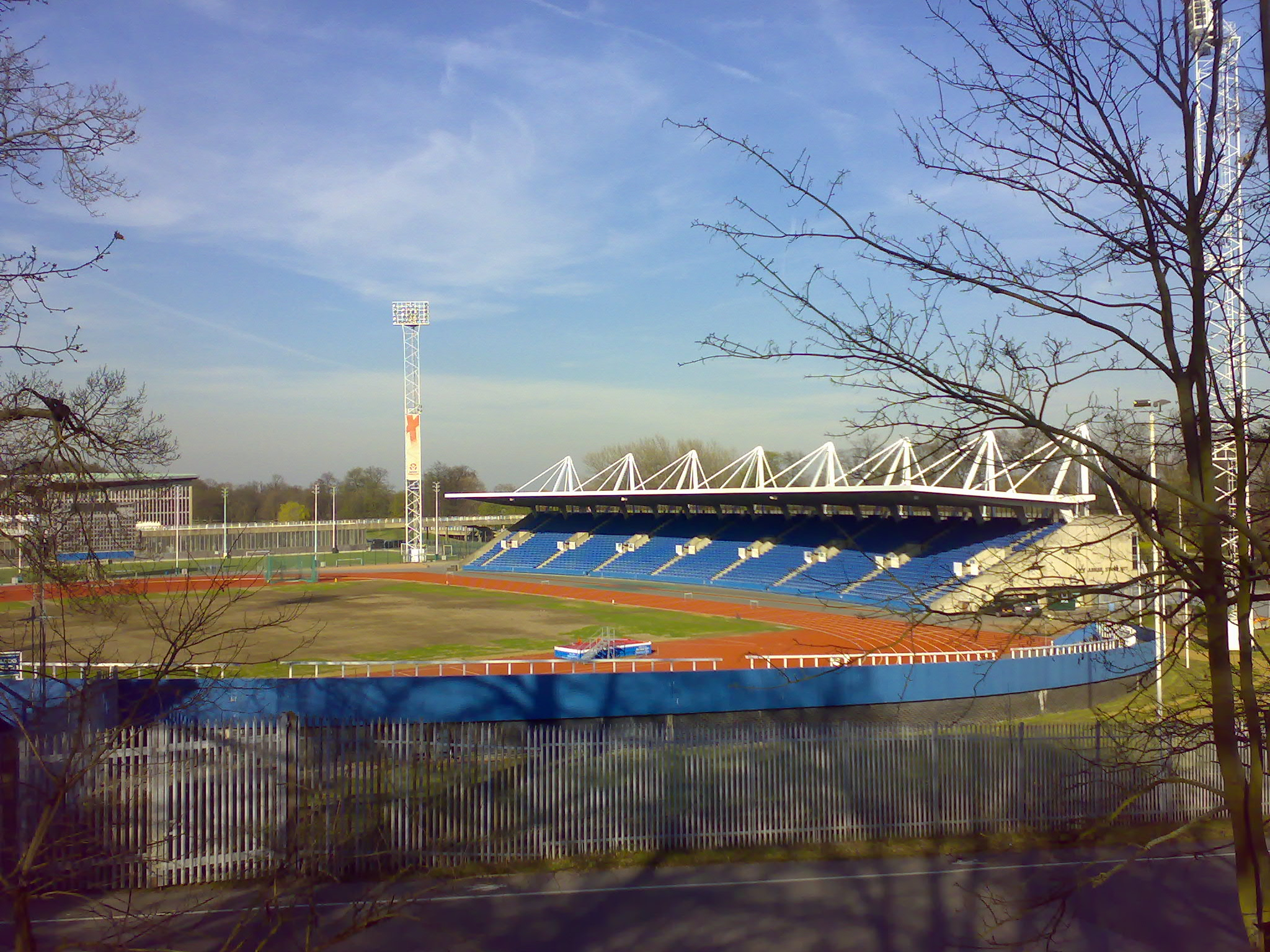
- Level: Senior
- Type: Outdoor

The 1993 UK Athletics Championships, sponsored by Pearl Assurance, was the national championship in outdoor track and field for the United Kingdom held at Crystal Palace Athletics Stadium, London. It was the second time that the British capital hosted the event, having previously done so in 1980. It would be the last outing of the series in its annual format.

It was the seventeenth edition of the competition limited to British athletes only, launched as an alternative to the AAA Championships, which was open to foreign competitors. However, because the calibre of national competition remained greater at the AAA event, the UK Championships this year were not considered the principal national championship event by some statisticians, such as the National Union of Track Statisticians (NUTS). Many of the athletes below also competed at the 1993 AAA Championships.

== Summary ==
The event programme was expanded to reincorporate men's and women's racewalking events (held separately at Bedford International Stadium), as well as the UK championship debut of both pole vault and hammer throw for women. The women's 3000 m race was dropped, however.

Hammer thrower Paul Head and discus thrower Jackie McKernan each won their fifth straight UK title. Linford Christie (100 m) and Paul Edwards (shot put) made it four consecutive wins in their events. Mick Hill repeated as javelin champion to win his fifth UK title overall. Myrtle Augee (shot put), Gowry Retchakan (400 m hurdles) and Debbie Marti (high jump) all defended their women's titles. Runners Curtis Robb and Phylis Smith returned as UK champions, but at longer distances than they won at in 1992.

The main international track and field competition for the United Kingdom that year was the 1993 World Championships in Athletics. Linford Christie added a world title to his UK and Olympic ones, while UK 100 m runner-up took gold in his hurdles speciality in Stuttgart. UK 200 m champion John Regis was runner-up at global level and Jonathan Edwards (triple jump) and Mick Hill (javelin throw) managed World Championships bronze.

== Medals ==
=== Men ===
Event	Gold		Silver		Bronze	
100m	Linford Christie	10.26	(Wales) Colin Jackson	10.41	Darren Campbell	10.44
200m (wind: +2.5 m/s)	John Regis	20.21 w	Darren Campbell	20.69 w	Jason John	20.74 w
400m	Du'aine Ladejo	46.14	Kriss Akabusi	46.35	David McKenzie	46.62
800m	Martin Steele	1:46.34	David Sharpe	1:47.12	Paul Walker	1:47.53
1,500m	Curtis Robb	3:39.58	Simon Fairbrother	3:39.64	Gary Lough	3:41.10
3,000m	Spencer Barden	8:01.86	Richard Findlow	8:03.38	Andy Lyons	8:05.77
5,000m	Jon Brown	13:39.68	Steve Cram	13:48.20	Eamonn Martin	13:50.90
110m hurdles	Andy Tulloch	13.70	David Nelson	13.72	Neil Owen	14.03
400m hurdles	Gary Cadogan	49.80	Peter Crampton	50.62	Lawrence Lynch	50.96
3000m steeplechase	Spencer Duval	8:32.77	Justin Chaston	8:32.79	Darren Mead	8:39.79
10,000 m walk	Darrell Stone	42:22.50	Steve Partington	42:43.99	Mark Easton	43:37.31
high jump	Dalton Grant	2.25 m	Brendan Reilly	2.25 m	(Scotland) Geoff Parsons	2.20 m
pole vault	Neil Winter	5.35 m	Mike Edwards	5.30 m	Matt Belsham	5.00 m
long jump	Ian Simpson	7.55 m	Fred Salle	7.55 m	John Munroe	7.47 m
triple jump	Tosi Fasinro	17.30 m w	Jonathan Edwards	17.18 m w	Julian Golley	16.64 m
shot put	(Wales) Paul Edwards	19.06 m	Matt Simson	17.93 m	David Callaway	17.30 m
discus throw	(Scotland) Darrin Morris	57.70 m	Robert Weir	56.60 m	Neville Thompson	55.68 m
hammer throw	Paul Head	71.48 m	Jason Byrne	67.82 m	Mick Jones	65.98 m
javelin throw	Mick Hill	86.94 m	Colin Mackenzie	76.86 m	Mark Roberson	75.50 m

=== Women ===
Event	Gold		Silver		Bronze	
100m	Beverly Kinch	11.37	Marcia Richardson	11.52	Paula Thomas	11.54
200m	Katharine Merry	23.20	Sally Gunnell	23.30	Stephi Douglas	23.54
400m	Phylis Smith	51.70	Diane Modahl	53.38	Sandra Leigh	53.84
800m	Kelly Holmes	2:00.86	Linda Keough	2:02.32	Jo Latimer	2:03.65
1,500m	Jayne Spark	4:14.66	Debbie Gunning	4:15.29	Michelle Faherty	4:15.89
100m hurdles	Jacqui Agyepong	13.22	Keri Maddox	13.24	Clova Court	13.40
400m hurdles	Gowry Retchakan	56.62	Jacqui Parker	57.14	(Scotland) Jane Low	59.28
5000 m walk	Julie Drake	23:07.61	Vicky Lupton	23:16.73	(Scotland) Verity Larby	23:48.66
high jump	Debbie Marti	1.90 m	Joanne Jennings	1.85 m	Julia Bennett	1.80 m
Pole vault	Kate Staples	3.40 m	Rhian Clarke	3.00 m	Linda Stanton	2.90 m
long jump	Fiona May	6.67 m w	Oluyinka Idowu	6.62 m	Jenny Kelly	6.09 m
triple jump	Michelle Griffith	13.72 m	Rachel Kirby	13.36 m	Evette Finikin	13.31 m
shot put	Myrtle Augee	17.12 m	Maggie Lynes	15.89 m	Sharon Andrews	15.49 m
discus throw	(Northern Ireland) Jackie McKernan	56.72 m	Debbie Callaway	52.84 m	Sharon Andrews	52.58 m
hammer throw	Lorraine Shaw	55.14 m	Fiona Whitehead	49.96 m	Ann Gardner	49.86 m
javelin throw	Sharon Gibson	56.90 m	Mandy Liverton	56.48 m	Kirsty Morrison	53.84 m
