= 1983 UK Athletics Championships =

British athletics event

- Dates: 28 & 29 May
- Host city: Edinburgh, Scotland
- Venue: Meadowbank Stadium
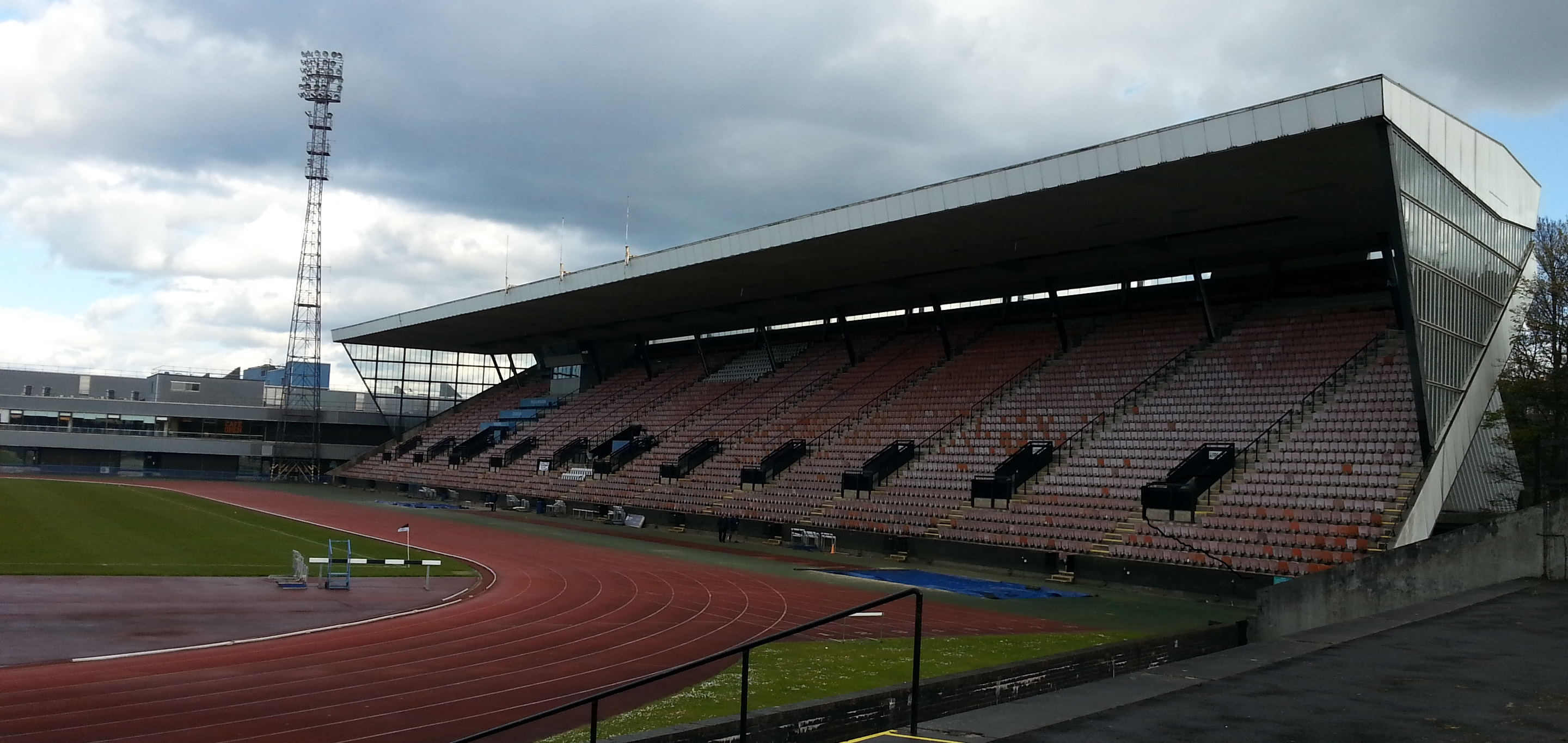
- Level: Senior
- Type: Outdoor

The 1983 UK Athletics Championships was the national championship in outdoor track and field for the United Kingdom held at Meadowbank Stadium, Edinburgh. It was the second time the event was held in the Scottish city, following on from the 1978 UK Athletics Championships.

It was the seventh edition of the competition limited to British athletes only, launched as an alternative to the AAA Championships, which was open to foreign competitors. However, because the calibre of national competition remained greater at the AAA event, the UK Championships this year were not considered the principal national championship event by some statisticians, such as the National Union of Track Statisticians (NUTS). Many of the athletes below also competed at the 1983 AAA Championships.

== Summary ==
The women's 5000 metres race walk was restored to the programme after an absence at the 1982 event.

Three athletes, Steve Barry (men's racewalk), Martin Girvan (men's hammer throw) and Fatima Whitbread (women's javelin throw) took their third straight UK titles. Aston Moore defended his men's triple jump title, as did women's long jumper Beverly Kinch and hurdler Susan Morley. Kathy Smallwood-Cook and Buster Watson achieved short sprint doubles and Venissa Head won both the women's shot put and discus throw.

The main international track and field competition for the United Kingdom that year was the inaugural 1983 World Championships in Athletics. Women's UK champions Fatima Whitbread and Kathy Smallwood-Cook went on to reach the world podium.

== Medals ==
=== Men ===
Event	Gold		Silver		Bronze	
100m	Buster Watson	10.43	(Scotland) Drew McMaster	10.49	Linford Christie	10.60
200m	Buster Watson	20.88	Todd Bennett	21.02	Donovan Reid	21.40
400m	Alan Slack	46.67	Kriss Akabusi	46.85	Steve Heard	46.98
800m	Peter Elliott	1:45.5	Rob Harrison	1:46.6	Steve Caldwell	1:47.0
1,500m	John Gladwin	3:45.09	Geoff Turnbull	3:45.69	(Scotland) Ian Archibald	3:45.95
5,000m	(Scotland) Nat Muir	13:35.21	Dick Callan	13:36.89	Steve Harris	13:37.31
10,000m	Steve Binns	28:02.42	(Scotland) Lawrie Spence	28:11.85	Gerry Helme	28:13.04
110m hurdles	(Wales) Nigel Walker	14.48	Lloyd Cowan	14.62	Gary Myles	14.69
400m hurdles	(Northern Ireland) Phil Beattie	51.05	(Scotland) Stan Devine	51.16	Wilbert Greaves	51.39
3000m steeplechase	David Lewis	8:29.72	Keith Irvine	8:41.37	Peter Barratt	8:41.45
10,000m walk	(Wales) Steve Barry	41:14.38	Ian McCombie	42:24.61	Martin Rush	43:42.75
high jump	Mark Lakey	2.10 m	Rupert Charles	2.05 m	Alex Kruger	2.05 m
pole vault	Keith Stock	5.30 m	Jeff Gutteridge	5.30 m	Billy Davey	4.80 m
long jump	Derrick Brown	7.21 m	(Scotland) John Scott	7.19 m	Denis Costello	7.16 m
triple jump	Aston Moore	16.40 m	John Herbert	16.36w m	Eric McCalla	15.64w m
shot put	Nick Tabor	17.20 m	Billy Cole	17.05 m	Ian Lindley	16.47 m
discus throw	Pete Tancred	55.22 m	Paul Mardle	54.86 m	Peter Gordon	54.36 m
hammer throw	Martin Girvan	72.38 m	(Scotland) Chris Black	71.80 m	Dave Smith	69.20 m
javelin throw	Peter Yates	80.84 m	Marcus Humphries	72.78 m	Mick Hill	69.94 m

=== Women ===
Event	Gold		Silver		Bronze	
100m	Kathy Smallwood-Cook	11.33	Kaye Jeffrey	11.51	Shirley Thomas	11.59
200m	Kathy Smallwood-Cook	23.08	(Scotland) Sandra Whittaker	23.51	(Scotland) Kaye Jeffrey	23.55
400m	Joslyn Hoyte-Smith	53.02	Sian Morris	53.27	(Scotland) Alison Reid	53.47
800m	Shireen Bailey	2:01.36	Lorraine Baker	2:01.71	Jane Finch	2:02.14
1,500m	Kathy Carter	4:16.03	Katie Fairbrass	4:16.10	Ruth Smeeth	4:17.30
3,000m	Wendy Sly	8:56.28	Christine Benning	8:56.99	(Scotland) Yvonne Murray	9:04.14
5,000m	(Scotland) Yvonne Murray	15:52.55	Paula Fudge	15:54.13	Julie Asgill	16:38.03
100m hurdles	Shirley Strong	13.15	(Scotland) Pat Rollo	13.51	Sharon Danville	13.66
400m hurdles	Susan Morley	56.67	Gladys Taylor	57.51	Verona Elder	58.05
5000m walk	Irene Bateman	23:42.2	Jill Barrett	24:08.4	Ginney Birch	24:18.6
high jump	Gillian Evans	1.87 m	(Northern Ireland) Janet Boyle	1.80 m	Ann-Marie Cording	1.75 m
long jump	Beverly Kinch	6.42 m	Joyce Oladapo	6.40 m	Carol Earlington	6.16 m
shot put	(Wales) Venissa Head	17.69 m	Caroline Savory	14.69 m	Myrtle Augee	14.63 m
discus throw	(Wales) Venissa Head	60.62 m	Lynda Whiteley	52.60 m	Julia Avis	51.40 m
javelin throw	Fatima Whitbread	62.14 m	Tessa Sanderson	61.44 m	Sharon Gibson	55.42 m
