= 1989 UK Athletics Championships =

British athletics event

- Dates: 3 & 4 June 1989
- Host city: Jarrow, England
- Venue: Monkton Stadium
- Level: Senior
- Type: Outdoor

The 1989 UK Athletics Championships sponsored by HFC Bank, was the national championship in outdoor track and field for the United Kingdom held at Monkton Stadium, Jarrow. It was the first time that the event was held in North East England. It was the thirteenth edition of the competition limited to British athletes only, launched as an alternative to the AAA Championships, which was open to foreign competitors. However, because the calibre of national competition remained greater at the AAA event, the UK Championships this year were not considered the principal national championship event by some statisticians, such as the National Union of Track Statisticians (NUTS). Many of the athletes below also competed at the 1989 AAA Championships.

== Summary ==
The men's 10,000 metres was dropped from the programme and replaced by a 3000 metres event. Strong winds affected the jumps programme and several of the sprint races.

Shot putter Judy Oakes won a sixth straight title and women's 400 m hurdler Elaine McLaughlin made it three consecutive wins for her. Three other athletes defended their 1988 UK titles: Ian McCombie (racewalk), Steve Backley (javelin) and Linda Keough (400 m). Liz McColgan won the women's 3000 metres, having been 5000 metres champion the previous year. Marcus Adam was the only athlete to win multiple titles that year, taking a men's short sprint double.

The main international track and field competition for the United Kingdom that year was the 1989 IAAF World Cup, where the men's team competed and women competed as part of the European team. Reflecting the secondary nature of the UK event, most of the individual British medallists at the World Cup did not compete here. Among those that did were Colin Jackson (hurdles runner-up), Stewart Faulkner (long jump bronze medallist), Jonathan Edwards (triple jump bronze medallist) and Steve Backley (javelin champion).

== Medals ==
=== Men ===
Event	Gold		Silver		Bronze	
100m	Marcus Adam	10.31	(Scotland) Elliot Bunney	10.43	(Scotland) Jamie Henderson	10.45
200m (wind: +2.3 m/s)	Marcus Adam	20.37 w	Ade Mafe	20.65 w	Todd Bennett	20.99 w
400m	Paul Sanders	47.02	Phil Brown	47.19	Mark Morris	47.58
800m	(Scotland) Nick Smith	1:48.08	Martin Steele	1:48.19	Nick Pearson	1:48.47
1,500m	Steve Crabb	3:42.65	Kevin McKay	3:42.94	Chris McGeorge	3:43.48
3,000m	David Moorcroft	7:50.76	Adrian Passey	7:52.07	(Scotland) Alistair Currie	7:53.39
5,000m	Steve Cram	13:28.58	Eamonn Martin	13:30.20	Craig Mochrie	13:36.04
110m hurdles (wind: +3.0 m/s)	(Wales) Colin Jackson	13.18 w	(Wales) Nigel Walker	13.49 w	David Nelson	13.63 w
400m hurdles	Max Robertson	50.50	Steve Hawkins	50.71	Bob Brown	51.33
3000m steeplechase	Neil Smart	8:41.13	Ken Penney	8:41.87	Mick Hawkins	8:47.35
10,000m walk	Ian McCombie	40:06.55	Steve Partington	42:40.16	Sean Martindale	43:26.63
high jump	Steve Chapman	2.20 m	John Holman	2.20 m	Warren Caswell	2.15 m
pole vault	Mike Edwards	5.10 m	Andy Ashurst	5.00 m	Ian Tullett	5.00 m
long jump	Mark Forsythe	8.05 m w	Ian Simpson	8.04 m w	Stewart Faulkner	8.01 m w
triple jump	Jonathan Edwards	16.45 m w	Francis Agyepong	16.24 m w	Vernon Samuels	16.06 m w
shot put	(Wales) Paul Edwards	17.89 m	Matt Simson	17.66 m	Graham Savory	17.46 m
discus throw	Graham Savory	55.90 m	Steve Casey	52.70 m	Abi Ekoku	52.52 m
hammer throw	Paul Head	70.28 m	Shane Peacock	69.08 m	Stewart Rogerson	68.98 m
javelin throw	Steve Backley	81.40 m	Mick Hill	80.64 m	Nigel Bevan	77.30 m

=== Women ===
Event	Gold		Silver		Bronze	
100m	Stephi Douglas	11.61	Simmone Jacobs	11.64	(Wales) Sallyanne Short	11.65
200m (wind: +2.9 m/s)	Jennifer Stoute	23.32 w	Louise Stuart	23.32 w	Wendy Addison	23.56 w
400m	Linda Keough	52.37	Angela Piggford	53.74	(Scotland) Dawn Kitchen	54.70
800m	Ann Williams	2:02.06	Dawn Gandy	2:03.98	Lorraine Baker	2:04.43
1,500m	(Scotland) Lynne MacIntyre	4:11.31	Alison Wyeth	4:13.33	Sonia McGeorge	4:14.24
3,000m	(Scotland) Liz McColgan	8:51.55	Karen Hutcheson	9:00.61	(Scotland) Laura Adam	9:12.33
5,000m	(Wales) Susan Tooby	16:04.99	(Scotland) Sandra Branney	16:08.15	Helen Titterington	16:16.95
100m hurdles	(Wales) Kay Morley	13.15	Lesley-Ann Skeete	13.42	Michelle Edwards	13.48
400m hurdles	(Northern Ireland) Elaine McLaughlin	57.03	Lorraine Hanson	57.94	Jennie Pearson	58.93
5000m walk	Lisa Langford	22:39.43	Betty Sworowski	23:17.92	Julie Drake	23:32.21
high jump	(Northern Ireland) Janet Boyle	1.83 m	Julia Bennett Kerry Roberts	1.80 m	Not awarded	
long jump	Fiona May	6.98 m w	Mary Berkeley	6.65 m w	Kim Hagger	6.46 m w
shot put	Judy Oakes	18.59 m	Myrtle Augee	17.94 m	Yvonne Hanson-Nortey	16.74 m
discus throw	(Northern Ireland) Jackie McKernan	54.40 m	Sharon Andrews	50.28 m	Jane Aucott	47.94 m
javelin throw	Sharon Gibson	54.60 m	Mandy Liverton	54.10 m	Shelley Holroyd	47.18 m
