= 1995 AAA Championships =

- Dates: 15–16 July
- Host city: Birmingham, England
- Venue: Alexander Stadium
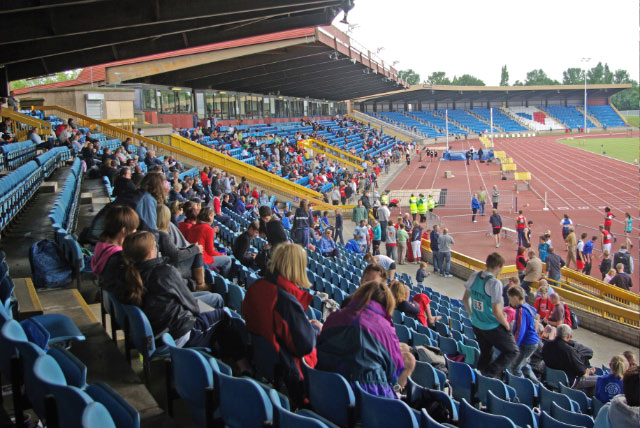
- Level: Senior
- Type: Outdoor

The 1995 AAA Championships sponsored by KP, was an outdoor track and field competition organised by the Amateur Athletic Association (AAA), held from 15 to 16 July at Alexander Stadium in Birmingham, England. It was considered the de facto national championships for the United Kingdom.

== Medal summary ==
=== Men ===
Event	Gold		Silver		Bronze	
100m	Darren Braithwaite	10.33	Jason John	10.34	Darren Campbell	10.37
200m	John Regis	20.37	Solomon Wariso	20.53	Darren Braithwaite	20.64
400m	Mark Richardson	44.94	Mark Hylton	45.83	Adrian Patrick	46.11
800m	Curtis Robb	1:46.78	(Scotland) David Strang	1:47.06	(Northern Ireland) Gary Lough	1:48.03
1,500m	John Mayock	3:40.55	Kevin McKay	3:40.83	Bruno Witchalls	3:41.51
3,000m	Nick Hopkins	8:11.86	Nick Comerford	8:13.27	(Republic of Ireland) David Burke	8:13.72
5,000m	Rob Denmark	13:37.57	(Wales) Jon Brown	13:37.83	(Kenya) Peter Ndirangu	13:39.57
10,000m	Gary Staines	28:49.29	Jon Solly	28:58.29	Chris Robison	29:03.69
110m hurdles	Neil Owen	13.63	Andy Tulloch	13.76	Lloyd Cowan	13.97
400m hurdles	(Australia) Rohan Robinson	49.21	Gary Cadogan	49.70	Gary Jennings	50.34
3000m steeplechase	Spencer Duval	8:24.64	(Zambia) Godfrey Siamusiye	8:25.49	Keith Cullen	8:29.64
10,000m walk	Darrell Stone	41:10.11	(Isle of Man) Steve Partington	41:14.61	(Scotland) Martin Bell	41:16.13
high jump	Steve Smith	2.35 m	(Australia) Chris Anderson	2.22 m	Dalton Grant	2.17 m
pole vault	Nick Buckfield	5.50 m	Andy Ashurst	5.10 m	Mike Edwards	5.10 m
long jump	Fred Salle	7.66 m	(Australia) Jai Taurima	7.63 m	Barrington Williams	7.50 m
triple jump	Francis Agyepong	17.13 m	Tayo Erogbogbo	15.83 m	Tosi Fasinro	15.65 m
shot put	Mark Proctor	18.81 m	Matt Simson	18.27 m	(Wales) Shaun Pickering	17.71 m
discus throw	(Republic of Ireland) Nick Sweeney	60.34 m	Bob Weir	60.18 m	Simon Williams	58.20 m
hammer throw	(Australia) Sean Carlin	73.40 m	Mick Jones	69.44 m	Jason Byrne	69.44 m
javelin throw	Mick Hill	80.54 m	Colin Mackenzie	77.50 m	Nigel Bevan	76.58 m
decathlon	Steve Rogers	7295 pts	Stephen Rowbotham	6637 pts	Matthew Gillard	5466 pts

=== Women ===
Event	Gold		Silver		Bronze	
100m	Paula Thomas	11.48	Simmone Jacobs	11.50	Stephi Douglas	11.53
200m	(Wales) Catherine Murphy	23.40	Simmone Jacobs	23.48	Joice Maduaka	23.95
400m	(Scotland) Melanie Neef	51.63	Lorraine Hanson	52.63	Georgina Oladapo	52.71
800m	Kelly Holmes	1:57.56	(United States) Jill Stamison	2:02.27	Abigail Hunte	2:02.47
1,500m	(Scotland) Yvonne Murray	4:11.47	Debbie Gunning	4:14.42	Una English	4:16.37
3,000m	Sarah Bentley	9:27.12	Gaby Collison	9:38.67	Amanda Thorpe	9:40.08
5,000m	Alison Wyeth	15:39.14	(United States) Nnenna Lynch	16:10.69	Louise Watson	16:11.23
10,000m	Jill Hunter	32:26.12	Louise Watson	33:38.52	Jane Shields	33:46.07
100m hurdles	Melani Wilkins	13.34	Michelle Campbell	13.36	Keri Maddox	13.40
400m hurdles	Gowry Retchakan	57.18	Stephanie McCann	58.21	Louise Brunning	58.58
5,000m walk	Lisa Langford	22:20.03	Vicky Lupton	22:23.80	(Isle of Man) Cal Partington	22:40.19
10,000m walk	Vicky Lupton	45:18.8	Melanie Wright	48:35.8	Sylvia Black	52:40.9
high jump	Lea Haggett	1.85 m	Diana Davies	1.85 m	Debbie Marti	1.85 m
pole vault	(United States) Melissa Price	3.70 m	Kate Staples	3.50 m	Claire Morrison	3.30 m
long jump	(Australia) Nicole Boegman	6.50 m	Denise Lewis	6.42 m	Yinka Idowu	6.35 m
triple jump	Michelle Griffith	13.43 m	Rachel Kirby	12.96 m	(Scotland) Karen Skeggs	12.11 m
shot put	Judy Oakes	17.75 m	Maggie Lynes	15.67 m	Carol Cooksley	14.07 m
discus throw	(Australia) Lisa-Marie Vizaniari	61.98 m	(Northern Ireland) Jackie McKernan	58.88 m	Shelley Drew	53.74 m
hammer throw	(Australia) Debbie Sosimenko	65.24 m	(Australia) Brenda MacNaughton	56.62 m	Lorraine Shaw	56.26 m
javelin throw	(Scotland) Lorna Jackson	55.48 m	Sharon Gibson	55.14 m	Karen Martin	54.96 m
heptathlon	Emma Beales	5524 pts	Jenny Kelly	5298 pts	Kerry Jury	5037 pts

== Other AAA titles ==
Event	Gold		Silver		Bronze	
men's marathon	(Mexico) Dionicio Cerón	2:08:30	(Australia) Steve Moneghetti	2:08:33	(Portugal) António Pinto	2:08:48
Women's marathon	(Poland) Małgorzata Sobańska	2:27:43	(Portugal) Manuela Machado	2:27:53	(Finland) Ritva Lemettinen	2:28:00

- + AAA marathon title determined by 1995 London Marathon placings
