= 1989 AAA Championships =

- Dates: 11–13 August
- Host city: Birmingham, England
- Venue: Alexander Stadium
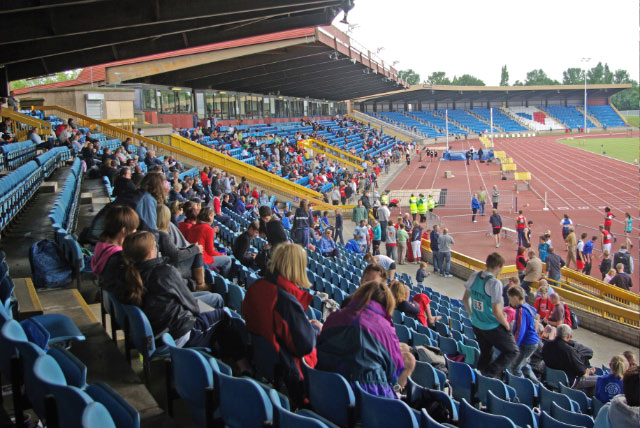
- Level: Senior
- Type: Outdoor

The 1989 AAA Championships was an outdoor track and field competition organised by the Amateur Athletic Association (AAA), held from 11 to 13 August at Alexander Stadium in Birmingham, England. It was considered the de facto national championships for the United Kingdom, ahead of the 1989 UK Athletics Championships.

The men's decathlon and women's heptathlon, 5000 metres and 10,000 metres events were hosted in Stoke-on-Trent. The women's triple jump was held in Middlesbrough and the women's 10 km road walk was held in Leeds.

== Medal summary ==
=== Men ===
Event	Gold		Silver		Bronze	
100m	Linford Christie	10.16	Marcus Adam	10.34	John Regis	10.39
200m	Marcus Adam	20.78	Ade Mafe	20.95	Linford Christie	21.02
400m	Phil Brown	46.26	Todd Bennett	46.40	Peter Crampton	46.43
800m	Ikem Billy	1:48.01	Matthew Yates	1:48.54	Kevin McKay	1:48.97
1,500m	Sebastian Coe	3:41.38	Tony Morrell	3:41.93	(Wales) Neil Horsfield	3:42.14
3,000m	(United States) Matt Giusto	8:00.38	Tony Leonard	8:04.92	Geoff Turnbull	8:06.01
5,000m	Mark Rowland	13:32.05	Eamonn Martin	13:32.59	Gary Staines	13:34.83
10,000m	Eamonn Martin	28:13.69	Tim Hutchings	28:15.97	Gary Staines	28:17.54
3000m steeplechase	Colin Walker	8:35.73	Eddie Wedderburn	8:35.86	Mick Hawkins	8:45.36
110m hurdles	(Wales) Colin Jackson	13.19	David Nelson	13.57	(Wales) Nigel Walker	13.80
400m hurdles	Max Robertson	50.30	(Belgium) Alain Cuypers	50.63	Mark Bishop	51.39
10,000m walk	Mark Easton	41:39.93	Darrell Stone	42:08.44	Paul Blagg	42:53.18
high jump	Dalton Grant	2.33 m	John Holman	2.20 m	Steve Chapman	2.15 m
pole vault	Mike Edwards	5.20 m	(Australia) Simon Arkell Ian Tullett	5.10 m	Not awarded	
long jump	Stewart Faulkner	8.13 m	John King	7.89 m	Barrington Williams	7.81 m
triple jump	Jonathan Edwards	16.53 m	Vernon Samuels	16.24 m	Eric McCalla	16.14 m
shot put	Simon Williams	18.73 m	Matt Simson	17.75 m	(Wales) Paul Edwards	17.27 m
discus throw	Paul Mardle	57.90 m	Abi Ekoku	56.82 m	Steve Casey	56.66 m
hammer throw	(United States) Jud Logan	72.34 m	Paul Head	70.32 m	David Smith	68.96 m
javelin throw	Steve Backley	83.16 m	Mick Hill	79.94 m	Mark Roberson	78.64 m
decathlon	Alex Kruger	7646 pts	Mark Bishop	7594 pts	Eugene Gilkes	7466 pts

=== Women ===
Event	Gold		Silver		Bronze	
100m	Paula Dunn	11.32w	Stephi Douglas	11.34w	Phylis Smith	11.61w
200m	Paula Dunn	23.43	Jenni Stoute	23.61	Linda Keough	23.69
400m	Linda Keough	51.09	Jenni Stoute	51.53	Angela Piggford	53.18
800m	Diane Edwards	2:01.24	Ann Williams	2:01.84	Lorraine Baker	2:02.23
1,500m	Bev Nicholson	4:09.34	Alison Wyeth	4:10.83	Shireen Bailey	4:11.15
3,000m	Alison Wyeth	9:11.12	Ruth Partridge	9:11.27	Sonia McGeorge	9:12.12
5,000m	Sue Crehan	16:18.55	Sarah Ing	16:43.20	Kay Gillingham	17:01.33
10,000m	Jill Hunter	33:01.6	Angie Pain	33:04.6	Sue Crehan	33:08.5
110m hurdles	Sally Gunnell	13.26	(Wales) Kay Morley	13.35	Lesley-Ann Skeete	13.38
400m hurdles	Wendy Cearns	56.05	Lorraine Hanson	56.70	Gowry Retchakan	57.17
5,000m walk	Betty Sworowski	22:30.59	Lisa Langford	23:40.68	Sarah Brown	24:05.38
10,000m walk	Lisa Langford Betty Sworowski	47:15	Not awarded		Julie Drake	48:55
high jump	Diana Davies	1.85 m	Michele Wheeler	1.85 m	(Northern Ireland) Janet Boyle Louise Gittens (Northern Ireland) Sharon Hutchings	1.80 m
long jump	(Australia) Nicole Boegman	6.74 m	Fiona May	6.62 m	Kim Hagger	6.54 m
triple jump	Evette Finikin	12.27 m	Allison Forbes	12.22 m	Emma Baker	10.97 m
shot put	Myrtle Augee	17.51 m	Yvonne Hanson-Nortey	16.38 m	Maggie Lynes	16.06 m
discus throw	Janette Picton	53.22 m	Sharon Andrews	52.84 m	Karen Pugh	51.58 m
javelin throw	Tessa Sanderson	58.64 m	Caroline White	52.88 m	Mandy Liverton	52.80 m
heptathlon	Kim Hagger	6126 pts	Joanne Mulliner	5677 pts	Yinka Idowu	5496 pts

== Other AAA titles ==
Event	Gold		Silver		Bronze	
men's marathon	(Kenya) Douglas Wakiihuri	2:09:03	(Australia) Steve Moneghetti	2:09:06	(Djibouti) Hussein Ahmed Salah	2:09:09
women's marathon	Véronique Marot	2:25:56	Angie Hulley	2:31:06	(Scotland) Lynn Harding	2:31:45

- + AAA champion determined by 1989 London Marathon placings
