= Andi Drake =

English racewalker

Personal information
- Nationality: British (English)
- Born: 6 February 1965 (age 60) Coventry, England

Sport
- Sport: Athletics
- Event: Race walk

Andrew Paul Drake (born 6 February 1965), is a male former athlete who competed for England.

== Biography ==
Drake finished second on two occasions behind Ian McCombie and Mark Easton respectively in the 10Km walk event at the 1987 AAA Championships and 1990 AAA Championships.

He became the British champion in 1999 after winning the British 10,000 metres walk title.

He represented England in the 20,000 metres walk event, at the 1998 Commonwealth Games in Kuala Lumpur, Malaysia.
