= Olly Flynn =

British race walker (born 1950)

Personal information
- Nationality: British (English)
- Born: 30 June 1950 (age 76) Ipswich, Suffolk, England
- Height: 193 cm (6 ft 4 in)
- Weight: 76 kg (168 lb)

Sport
- Sport: Athletics
- Event: Racewalking
- Club: Basildon AC
Medal record
Athletics
Representing England
Commonwealth Games
Gold medal – first place	1978 Edmonton	30km walk

Oliver Thomas Flynn (born 30 June 1950) is a retired male race walker from England who competed at the 1976 Summer Olympics.

== Biography ==
Flynn finished third behind Phil Embleton in the 10 km event at the 1972 AAA Championships and finished second behind Roger Mills at the 1973 AAA Championships.

The AAA title continued to elude him as he finished third behind Brian Adams in 1975 but he represented Great Britain at the 1976 Olympics Games in Montreal.

He represented England and won a gold medal in the 30 kilometres walk event, at the 1978 Commonwealth Games in Edmonton, Canada.

== International competitions ==
Year	Competition	Venue	Position	Notes
1976	Olympic Games	Montreal, Canada	14th	20 km
1978	Commonwealth Games	Edmonton, Canada	1st	30 km
