= 1975 AAA Championships =

Outdoor track and field competition

- Dates: 1–2 August 1975
- Host city: London, England
- Venue: Crystal Palace National Sports Centre
- Level: Senior
- Type: Outdoor

The 1975 AAA Championships was the 1975 edition of the annual outdoor track and field competition organised by the Amateur Athletic Association (AAA). It was held from 1 to 2 August 1975 at Crystal Palace National Sports Centre in London, England.

== Summary ==
The Championships covered two days of competition. The marathon was held in Stoke-on-Trent and the decathlon event was held in Cwmbran.

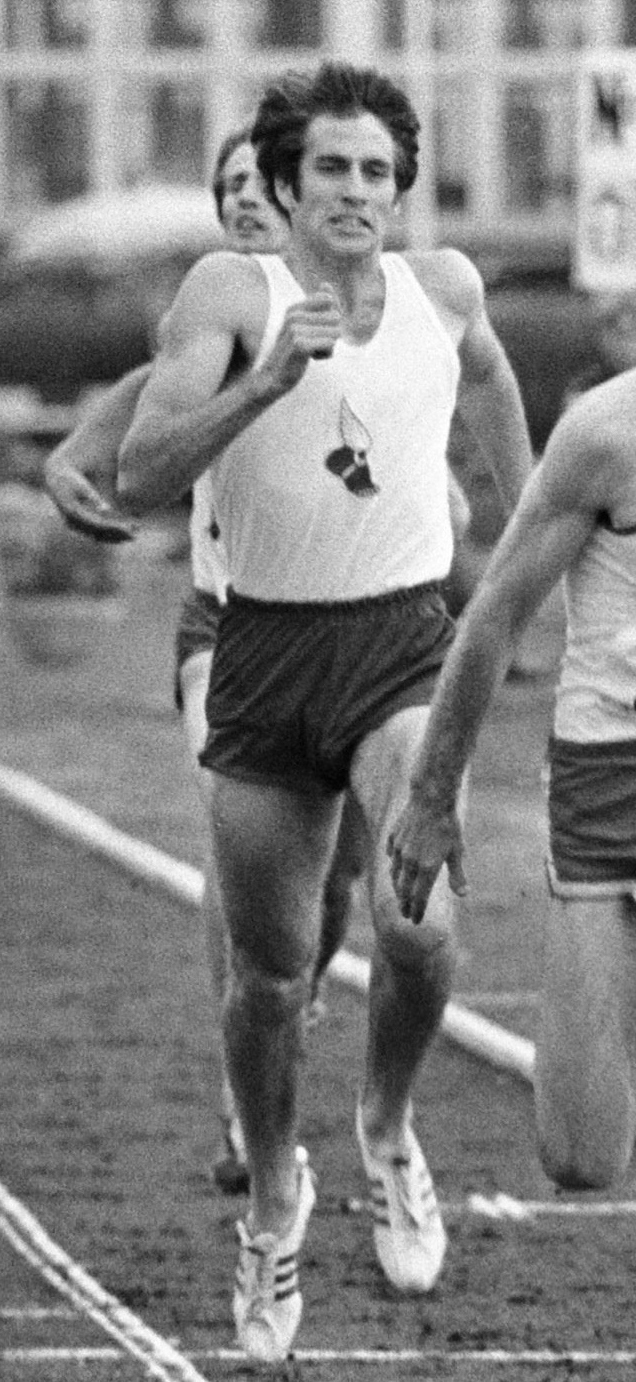
Marty Liquori won the 5,000 metres

== Results ==
Event	Gold		Silver		Bronze	
100m	(United States) Steve Riddick	10.39	Ainsley Bennett	10.50	Dave Roberts	10.65
200m	(United States) Steve Riddick	20.81	Ainsley Bennett	20.87	(Jamaica) Anthony Davies	21.26
400m	(Scotland) David Jenkins	45.87	Glen Cohen	46.81	(New Zealand) Bevan Smith	46.89
800m	Steve Ovett	1:46.09	Peter Browne	1:46.43	(Republic of Ireland) Niall O'Shaughnessy	1:46.79
1,500m	(South Africa) Danie Malan	3:38.07	(Scotland) Frank Clement	3:40.25	Erwin Hartel	3:40.56
5,000m	(United States) Marty Liquori	13:32.52	(South Africa) Titus Mamabola	13:33.03	Nick Rose	13:35.23
10,000m	Dave Black	27:54.23	Jim Brown	28:00.62	Bernie Ford	28:02.32
marathon	Jeff Norman	2:15:50	Keith Angus	2:16:14	Colin Kirkham	2:16:22
3000m steeplechase	Tony Staynings	8:29.86	Dennis Coates	8:30.64	John Bicourt	8:34.94
110m hurdles	(Wales) Berwyn Price	13.94	Graham Gower	14.23	Alan Cronin	14.30
400m hurdles	Bill Hartley	49.65	(United States) Bob Cassleman	50.23	(Netherlands) Frank Nusse	50.85
3,000m walk	Paul Nihill	12:43.14	Peter Marlow	12:51.09	Amos Seddon	12:59.40
10,000m walk	Brian Adams	42:40.0	Roger Mills	43:20.8	Olly Flynn	44:25.8
high jump	(South Africa) Reinhard Schiel	2.10	(Scotland) Angus McKenzie	2.10	(West Germany) Eckart Eitel	2.10
pole vault	(Australia) Ray Boyd	5.00	Jeff Gutteridge	4.75	Keith Stock	4.75
long jump	Alan Lerwill	7.77	(Scotland) Stewart Atkins	7.36	Geoff Hignett	7.35
triple jump	(Australia) Mick McGrath	16.12	David Johnson	15.95	(Australia) Don Commons	15.58
shot put	Geoff Capes	20.20	Mike Winch	18.49	Bob Dale	17.53
discus throw	(South Africa) John Van Reenan	62.26	Bill Tancred	62.22	Mike Winch	58.04
hammer throw	(South Africa) Adam Barnard	73.58	Paul Dickenson	68.74	(Australia) Peter Farmer	65.24
javelin throw	(South Africa) Herman Potgieter	78.14	Dave Travis	74.66	Ron Silvester	74.08
decathlon	Pan Zeniou	6931	Chris Youngs	6670	Mike Corden	6652

== See also ==
- 1975 WAAA Championships
