= List of British champions in 3000 metres =

The British 3,000 metres athletics champions covers two competitions; the Amateur Athletic Club Championships (1968-1999) and the UK Athletics Championships which existed from 1977 until 1997 and ran concurrently with the AAA Championships.

Between 1977 and 1987 two events effectively crowned national champions each year. The official UK Athletics Championships (not to be confused with the current championships, a rebranded British Athletics Championships) were specifically only open to British nationals and were organised by the national governing body. The AAA Championships continued, and due to their history, continued to be considered by both statisticians and athletes to be the more prestigious championships. The UK Athletics Championships ceased to exist upon the insolvency of the governing body.

Where an international athlete won the AAA Championships the highest ranking UK athlete is considered the National Champion in this list.

== Past winners ==
WAAA Championships 3000 metres, women's event only
| Year | Women's champion |
|---|---|
| 1968 | Carol Firth |
| 1969 | Barbara Banks |
| 1970 | Bridget Cushen |
| 1971 | Joyce Smith |
| 1972 | Paula Yeoman |
| 1973 | Joyce Smith |
| 1974 | Joyce Smith |
| 1975 | Christine Haskett |
| 1976 | Thelwyn Bateman |

WAAA Championships & UK Athletics Championships dual championships era 1977-1987
| Year | WAAA Women | Year | UK Women |
|---|---|---|---|
| 1977 | Carol Gould | 1977 | Glynis Penny |
| 1978 | Christine Benning | 1978 | Paula Fudge |
| 1979 | Kathryn Binns | 1979 | Glynis Penny |
| 1980 | Regina Joyce | 1980 | Kathryn Binns |
| 1981 | Val Rowe | 1981 | Ruth Smeeth |
| 1982 | Debbie Peel | 1982 | Paula Fudge |
| 1983 | Debbie Peel | 1983 | Wendy Sly |
| 1984 | Debbie Peel | 1984 | Christine Benning |
| 1985 | Zola Budd | 1985 | Yvonne Murray |
| 1986 | Christine Benning | 1986 | Wendy Sly |
| 1987 | Wendy Sly | 1987 | Yvonne Murray |

AAA Championships & UK Athletics Championships dual championships era 1988-1993
| Year | Men AAA | Women AAA | Year | Men UK | Women UK |
|---|---|---|---|---|---|
| 1988 | nc | Yvonne Murray | 1988 | nc | Melissa Watson |
| 1989 | Tony Leonard | Alison Wyeth | 1989 | David Moorcroft | Liz McColgan |
| 1990 | Matthew Clarkson | Yvonne Murray | 1990 | Geoff Turnbull | Andrea Wallace |
| 1991 | Tom Hanlon | Yvonne Murray | 1991 | Peter Elliott | Liz McColgan |
| 1992 | Michael Quinn | Lisa York | 1992 | John Nuttall | Liz McColgan |
| 1993 | NBA | Yvonne Murray | 1993 | Spencer Barden | Yvonne Murray |

AAA Championships
| Year | Men's champion | Women's champion |
|---|---|---|
| 1994 | Bashir Hussain | Sonia McGeorge |
| 1995 | Nick Hopkins | Sarah Bentley |
| 1996 | Matt O'Dowd | Debbie Gunning |
| 1997 | Allen Graffin | Debbie Sullivan |
| 1998 | Nick Comerford | Amanda Parkinson |
| 1999 | Andrew Graffin | Jilly Ingman |

DISCONTINUED

- NBA = No British athlete in medal placings
- nc = not contested
