= Zahara Hyde =

English long-distance runner

Personal information
- Nationality: British (English)
- Born: 12 January 1963 (age 62)

Sport
- Sport: Athletics
- Event: long distance running
- Club: Woking AC

Zahara Hyde OBE (born 12 January 1963), is a former track and field athlete who competed for England in Athletics.

== Biography ==
Hyde became the British 10,000 metres champion after winning the British AAA Championships title at the 1994 AAA Championships.

She represented England in the 10,000 metres event, at the 1994 Commonwealth Games in Victoria, Canada.

== Professional career ==
Hyde is an Executive Programme Director for the NHS. She graduated from an NHS Fast Track programme with Harvard Kennedy School in 2015. The programme looks at global healthcare systems; transformational change in public sector and value models for healthcare.

She has held several senior positions within sport, including CEO of British Triathlon between 2008-2014. She oversaw a period of phenomenal growth in the sport following the successful London 2012 Olympic Triathlon event, in which Great Britain won a gold and a bronze medal. She was recognised in 2010 for her services to British Sport when she was appointed to the Order of the British Empire (OBE). British Triathlon was also twice named as Sports Governing Body of the Year at the annual UK Sport Industry Awards during her time as CEO.
