= Jacqui Parker =

English hurdler

Personal information
- Nationality: British (English)
- Born: 15 October 1966 (age 59) Titchfield, Great Britain

Sport
- Sport: Athletics
- Event: hurdles
- Club: Woodford Green with Essex Ladies

Jacqueline Parker (born 15 October 1966) is an English female former athlete who competed in the 400 metres hurdles. She represented Great Britain at the World Championships in 1991 and 1993. She won the 1991 UK title and the 1993 AAA Championships title.

== Career ==
Parker was a member of the Essex Ladies Athletics club (now Woodford Green with Essex Ladies). In 1983, she won the AAAs National Under 17 title in the 400 m hurdles, running 62.37.

Parker then competed for the Iowa State Cyclones track and field team in the NCAA. Her senior breakthrough came in 1990 when she finished second at the AAA Championships in 57.43, behind Gowry Retchakan's 57.14. This performance earned her selection for the European Championships in Split, where she ran 56.84 in her heat to reach the semi-finals. In her semi-final she ran 57.06, failing to reach the final.

Parker won her first senior national title in June 1991, winning the UK Championship title in 57.64. On 24 July, she finished fourth in the final at the 1991 Universiade in Sheffield, in 56.93. Three days later, she again finished second to Gowry Retchakan at the AAAs Championships, running a lifetime best of 56.15 secs to earn World Championship selection. At the 1991 World Championships in Tokyo, she was eliminated in the heats in a disappointing 57.81.

She began the 1992 season by finishing third at the UK Championships behind Retchakan and Louise Fraser, running 56.99. She then narrowly missed Olympic selection by finishing fourth at the AAAs Championships, which incorporated the Olympic trials. With Sally Gunnell (who won the sprint hurdles at the trials) already assured selection, there were two places available in the 400 m hurdles. The race was won by Gowry Retchakan in 55.04, with Australian Gail Luke second in 56.25. The final Olympic place went to Louise Fraser, as she edged out Parker 56.30 - 56.35. Parker was named as an Olympic reserve.

Parker finished second at the 1993 UK Championships in 57.14, behind Gowry Retchakan. She then won the AAAs title with a time of 58.14, earning selection for her second World Championships. At the 1993 World Championships in Stuttgart, she ran 56.93 in her heat to reach the semi-finals, where she was eliminated running 56.68. She then finished second at the 1994 AAAs Championships, once again behind Retchakan, 57.14 - 57.31, to earn selection for the 1994 European Championships in Helsinki. At the Europeans, she was eliminated in the heats with 57.83. A few weeks later, she reached the final at the Commonwealth Games in Victoria, finishing sixth in 56.72.

== Competition record ==
Year	Competition	Venue	Position	Event	Notes
Representing Great Britain
1990	European Championships	Split, Yugoslavia	13th (sf)	400 m hurdles	57.06 (56.84 in heat)
1991	Universiade	Sheffield, United Kingdom	4th	400 m hurdles	56.93
1991	World Championships	Tokyo, Japan	23rd (h)	400 m hurdles	57.81
1993	World Indoor Championships	Toronto, Canada	18th (h)	800 m	2:09.99
1993	World Championships	Stuttgart, Germany	23rd (sf)	400 m hurdles	56.68
1994	European Championships	Helsinki, Finland	19th (h)	400 m hurdles	57.83
Representing England
1994	Commonwealth Games	Victoria, Canada	6th	400 m hurdles	56.72
National Championships
1990	AAA Championships	Birmingham, England	2nd	400 m hurdles	57.43
1991	UK Championships	Cardiff, Wales	1st	400 m hurdles	57.64
1991	AAA Championships	Birmingham, England	2nd	400 m hurdles	56.15
1992	UK Championships	Sheffield, England	3rd	400 m hurdles	56.99
1992	AAA Championships	Birmingham, England	4th	400 m hurdles	56.35
1993	UK Championships	London, England	2nd	400 m hurdles	57.14
1993	AAA Championships	Birmingham, England	1st	400 m hurdles	58.14
1994	AAA Championships	Sheffield, England	2nd	400 m hurdles	57.31
(#) indicates overall position in qualifying heats (h) or semifinals (sf).
