= 1972 AAA Championships =

Outdoor track and field competition

- Dates: 14–15 July 1972
- Host city: London, England
- Venue: Crystal Palace National Sports Centre
- Level: Senior
- Type: Outdoor

The 1972 AAA Championships was the 1972 edition of the annual outdoor track and field competition organised by the Amateur Athletic Association (AAA). It was held from 14 to 15 July 1972 at Crystal Palace National Sports Centre in London, England.

== Summary ==
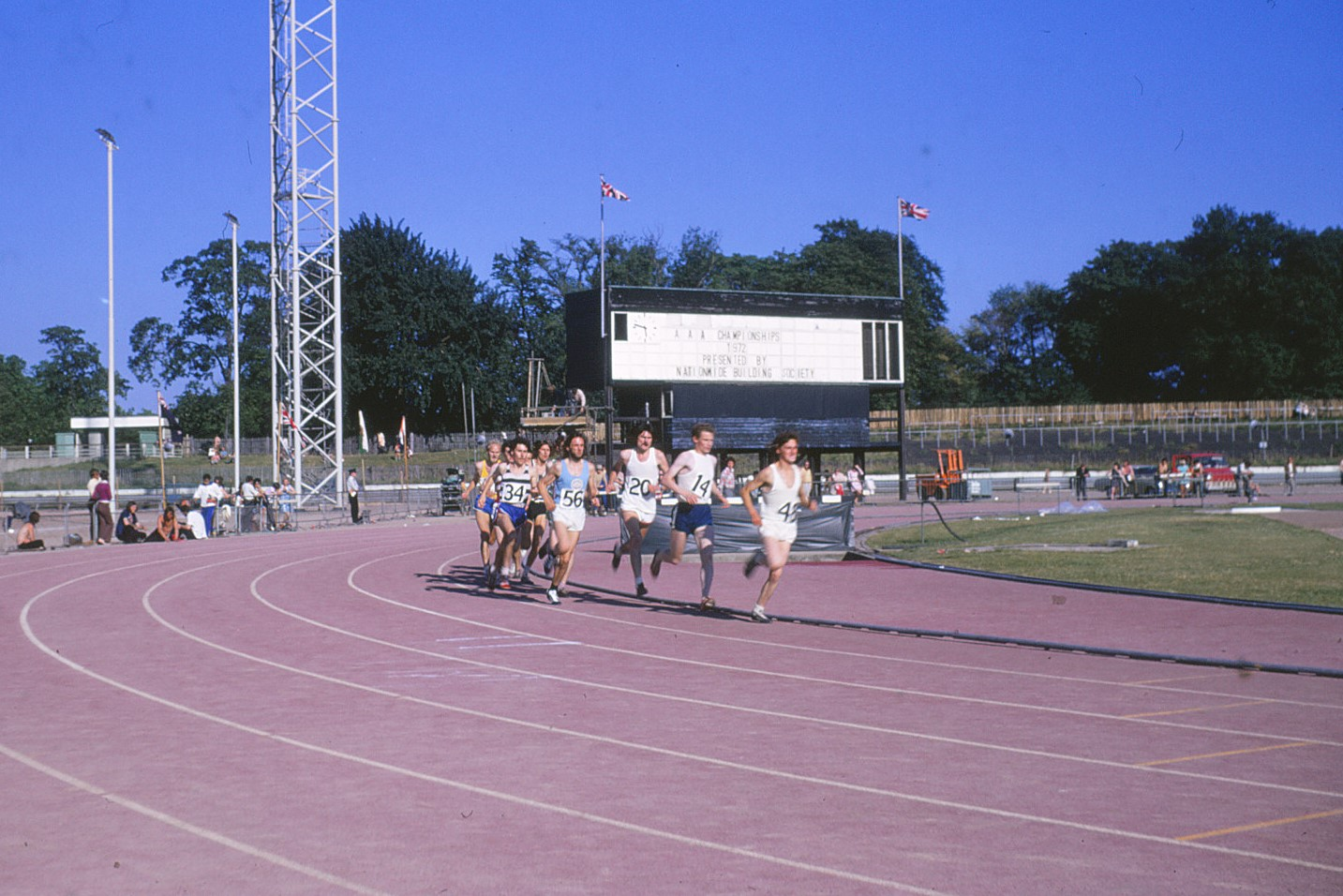
1972 AAA Championships track race

The Championships covered two days of competition. The marathon was held in Harlow.

The 10 miles event was held for the last time.

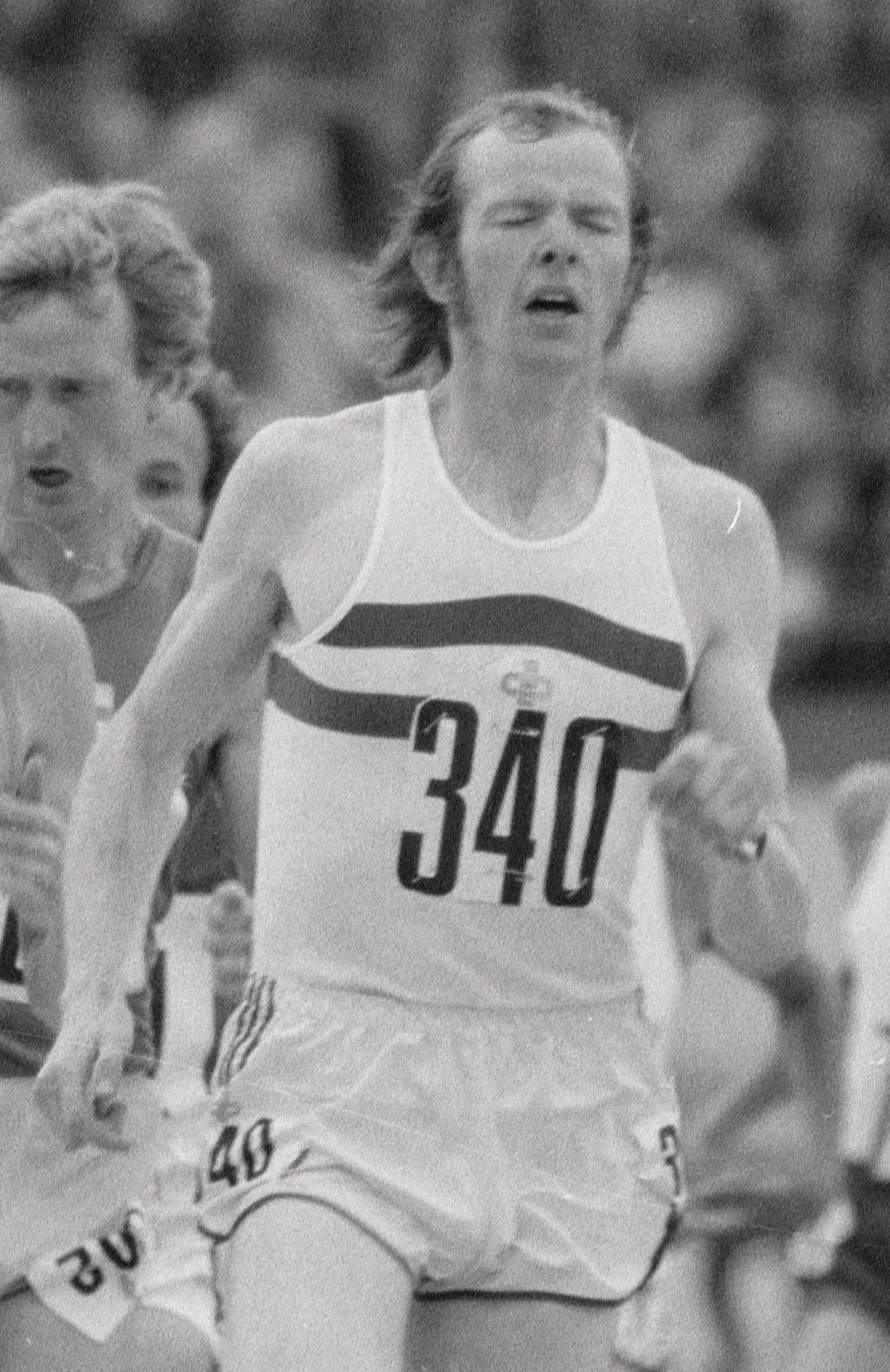
Ray Smedley finished second in the 1500m

== Results ==
Event	Gold		Silver		Bronze	
100m	(Greece) Vasilios Papageorgopoulos	10.16w	Brian Green	10.35w	(Scotland) Les Piggot	10.36w
200m	Alan Pascoe	20.92	David Dear	21.31	Martin Reynolds	21.40
400m	(Scotland) David Jenkins	45.39 NR	Gary Armstrong	46.16	(Nigeria) Robert Ojo	46.53
800m	Andy Carter	1:48.18	Dave Cropper	1:48.35	Colin Campbell	1:48.40
1,500m	(Scotland) Peter Stewart	3:38.22 NR	Ray Smedley	3:38.52	John Kirkbride	3:38.68
5,000m	Dave Bedford	13:17.21 ER	(Scotland) Ian McCafferty	13:19.66	(Scotland) Ian Stewart	13:24.16
10,000m	Dave Bedford	27:52.44	(Scotland) Lachie Stewart	28:38.31	(Netherlands) Jos Hermens	28:39.00
10 miles	Bernie Plain	48:25.8	Tony Birks	48:26.4	Keith Angus	48:35.2
marathon	(West Germany) Lutz Philipp	2:12:50	Ron Hill	2:12:51	(Scotland) Don Macgregor	2:15:06
3000m steeplechase	Steve Hollings	8:31.07	John Bicourt	8:34.72	Andy Holden	8:36.20
110m hurdles	Alan Pascoe	13.88	Berwyn Price	14.00	Graham Gower	14.10
400m hurdles	David Hemery	49.67	(Uganda) John Akii-Bua	49.68	John Sherwood	50.96
3,000m walk	Roger Mills	12:31.54	Phil Embleton	12:39.76	Peter Marlow	12:45.68
10,000m walk	Phil Embleton	44:26.8	Peter Marlow	45:37.0	Olly Flynn	46:28.4
high jump	(West Germany) Milan Jamrich	2.08	Colin Boreham	2.01	(Republic of Ireland) James Fanning; Michael Campbell	2.01
pole vault	Mike Bull	5.21 NR	(Spain) Ignacio Sola	4.90	Brian Hooper	4.80
long jump	Alan Lerwill	8.15	(Wales) Lynn Davies	7.74	(Scotland) Stewart Atkins	7.61
triple jump	David Johnson	15.80	Rodney Heward-Mills	15.77	(Spain) Jesus Bartolomé	15.71
shot put	Geoff Capes	19.47	Jeff Teale	18.84	Bill Tancred	18.20
discus throw	Bill Tancred	61.06	John Watts	59.70	Peter Tancred	54.44
hammer throw	Barry Williams	67.24	Howard Payne	66.08	(New Zealand) Murray Cheater	63.60
javelin throw	Dave Travis	79.62	Brian Roberts	75.20	John McSorley	73.20
decathlon	Barry King	7346	(Scotland) David Kidner	7145	Nick Phipps	6628

== See also ==
- 1972 WAAA Championships
