= List of British champions in 10,000 metres walk =

The British 10,000 metres walk athletics champions covers three competitions; the AAA Championships (1880-2006), the Amateur Athletic Club Championships (1866-1879) and the UK Athletics Championships which existed from 1977 until 1997 and ran concurrently with the AAA Championships.

Where an international athlete won the AAA Championships, the highest ranking UK athlete is considered the National Champion in this list. The 10,000 metres walks was discontinued after the 2000 edition. The event was reintroduced in 2024.

== Past winners ==
AAC Championships 7 miles walk, men's event only
| Year | Men's champion |
|---|---|
| 1866 | John Graham Chambers |
| 1867 | Thomas Farnworth |
| 1868 | Walter Rye |
| 1869 | Thomas Griffith |
| 1870 | Thomas Griffith |
| 1871 | J. Francis |
| 1872 | T.R. Hogg |
| 1873 | William Morgan |
| 1874 | William Morgan |
| 1875 | William Morgan |
| 1876 | Harry Venn |
| 1877 | Harry Webster |
| 1878 | Harry Venn |
| 1879 | Harry Webster / Harry Venn |

AAA Championships 7 miles walk, men's event only
| Year | Men's champion |
|---|---|
| 1880 | George Beckley |
| 1881 | John Raby |
| 1882 | Henry Whyatt |
| 1883 | Henry Whyatt |
| 1884 | James Jervis |
| 1885 | James Jervis |
| 1886 | Joseph Jullie |
| 1887 | J. R. Lewis |
| 1888 | J. R. Lewis |
| 1889 | William Wheeler |
| 1890 | Harry Curtis |
| 1891 | Harry Curtis |
| 1892 | Harry Curtis |
| 1893 | Harry Curtis |
4 miles walk, men's event only
| 1894 | Harry Curtis |
| 1895 | William Sturgess |
| 1896 | William Sturgess |
| 1897 | William Sturgess |
| 1898 | William Sturgess |
| 1899 | William Sturgess |
| 1900 | William Sturgess |
7 miles walk, men's event only
| 1901 | Jack Butler |
| 1902 | William Sturgess |
| 1903 | Jack Butler |
| 1904 | George Larner |
| 1905 | George Larner |
| 1906 | Fred Carter |
| 1907 | Frederick Thompson |
| 1908 | Ernest Webb |
| 1909 | Ernest Webb |
| 1910 | Ernest Webb |
| 1911 | George Larner |
| 1912 | Bobby Bridge |
| 1913 | Bobby Bridge & Harold Ross |
| 1914 | Bobby Bridge |
| 1919 | William Hehir |
| 1920 | Charles Dowson |
| 1921 | Harold Ross |
| 1922 | Gordon Watts |
| 1923 | Gordon Watts |
| 1924 | Reg Goodwin |
| 1925 | Gordon Watts |
| 1926 | Reg Goodwin |
| 1927 | Wilf Cowley |
| 1928 | Cecil Hyde |
| 1929 | Cecil Hyde |
| 1930 | Cecil Hyde |
| 1931 | Alf Pope |
| 1932 | Alf Pope |
| 1933 | Johnny Johnson |
| 1934 | Johnny Johnson |
| 1935 | Henry Hake |
| 1936 | Vic Stone |
| 1937 | Harry Churcher |
| 1938 | Joe Coleman |
| 1939 | Harry Churcher |
| 1946 | Eddie Staker |
| 1947 | Harry Churcher |
| 1948 | Harry Churcher |
| 1949 | Harry Churcher |
| 1950 | Roland Hardy |
| 1951 | Roland Hardy |
| 1952 | Roland Hardy |
| 1953 | Roland Hardy |
| 1954 | George Coleman |
| 1955 | Roland Hardy |
| 1956 | George Coleman |
| 1957 | Stan Vickers |
| 1958 | Stan Vickers |
| 1959 | Ken Matthews |
| 1960 | Ken Matthews |
| 1961 | Ken Matthews |
| 1962 | Colin Williams |
| 1963 | Ken Matthews |
| 1964 | Ken Matthews |
| 1965 | Paul Nihill |
| 1966 | Paul Nihill |
| 1967 | Malcolm Tolley |
| 1968 | Paul Nihill |
10,000 metres walk, men's event only
| 1969 | Paul Nihill |
| 1970 | Bill Sutherland |
| 1971 | Phil Embleton |
| 1972 | Phil Embleton |
| 1973 | Roger Mills |
| 1974 | Peter Marlow |
| 1975 | Brian Adams |
| 1976 | Brian Adams |
| 1977 | Brian Adams |

AAA Championships/WAAA Championships & UK Athletics Championships dual championships era 1978-1987
| Year | AAA Men | Year | WAAA Women | Year | UK Men |
|---|---|---|---|---|---|
| 1978 | Brian Adams | 1978 | Carol Tyson | 1978 | nc |
| 1979 | Brian Adams | 1979 | Marion Fawkes | 1979 | nc |
| 1980 | Roger Mills | 1980 | Carol Tyson | 1980 | Adrian James |
| 1981 | Steve Barry | 1981 | Irene Bateman | 1981 | Steve Barry |
| 1982 | Steve Barry | 1982 | Irene Bateman | 1982 | Steve Barry |
| 1983 | Steve Barry | 1983 | Irene Bateman | 1983 | Steve Barry |
| 1984 | Ian McCombie | 1984 | Helen Elleker | 1984 | Phil Vesty |
| 1985 | Roger Mills | 1985 | Helen Elleker | 1985 | Ian McCombie |
| 1986 | Ian McCombie | 1986 | Helen Elleker | 1986 | Phil Vesty |
| 1987 | Ian McCombie | 1987 | Sarah Brown | 1987 | Ian McCombie |

AAA Championships & UK Athletics Championships dual championships era 1988-1997
| Year | Men AAA | Women AAA | Year | Men UK | Women UK |
|---|---|---|---|---|---|
| 1988 | Ian McCombie | Betty Sworowski | 1988 | Ian McCombie | nc |
| 1989 | Mark Easton | Lisa Langford; Betty Sworowski | 1989 | Ian McCombie | Betty Sworowski |
| 1990 | Mark Easton | Vicky Lupton | 1990 | Ian McCombie | nc |
| 1991 | Ian McCombie | Betty Sworowski | 1991 | Steve Partington | nc |
| 1992 | Martin Rush | nc | 1992 | nc | nc |
| 1993 | Martin Bell | Verity Larby | 1993 | Darrell Stone | nc |
| 1994 | Darrell Stone | Verity Larby | n/a | | |
| 1995 | Darrell Stone | Vicky Lupton | n/a | | |
| 1996 | Steve Partington | Vicky Lupton | n/a | | |
| 1997 | Phil King | Catherine Charnock | 1997 | Andy Penn | nc |

AAA Championships second era 1998-2006
| Year | Men's champion | Women's champion |
|---|---|---|
| 1998 | Martin Bell | Pam Phillips |
| 1999 | Andi Drake | nc |
| 2000 | Matt Hales | Lisa Kehler |
not held 2001-2023
| 2024 | Callum Wilkinson | nc |

- nc = not contested
