= Gordon Watts =

British racewalker

Personal information
- Nationality: British
- Born: 8 December 1893 Faversham, England
- Died: March 1986 Shepway, England

Sport
- Sport: Athletics
- Event: Racewalking
- Club: Surrey Walking Club, Croydon

Hubert Gordon Amos Watts (8 December 1893 – March 1986) was a British racewalker, who competed at the Olympic Games.

== Career ==
Watts became the national 7 miles walk champion after winning the British AAA Championships title at the 1922 AAA Championships. He successfully retained his title at the 1923 AAA Championships and in addition won the 2 miles walk title.

At the 1924 Olympic Games, Watts competed in the men's 10 kilometres walk.

In 1925 Watts won his third 7 miles walk AAA title at the 1925 AAA Championships.
