= Susan Crehan =

British long-distance runner

Personal information
- Nationality: British (English)
- Born: 12 September 1956 (age 69) St. Helens, England
- Height: 165 cm (5 ft 5 in)
- Weight: 55 kg (121 lb)

Sport
- Sport: Athletics
- Event: Long-distance running
- Club: Sale Harriers

Susan "Sue" Crehan (born 12 September 1956) is a British long-distance runner who competed at the 1988 Summer Olympics.

== Biography ==
Crehan finished third in both the 5,000 and 10,000 metres behind Shireen Samy and Priscilla Welch respectively, at the 1984 WAAA Championships. The following year Crehan became the British 10,000 metres champion after winning the British WAAA Championships title at the 1985 WAAA Championships and regained the same title at the 1987 WAAA Championships.

At the 1988 Olympic Games in Seoul, Crehan represented Great Britain in the women's marathon, finishing 32nd.

Crehan became the British 5000 champion after winning the AAA title at the 1989 AAA Championships.

== International competitions ==
Year	Competition	Venue	Position	Event	Notes
Representing Great Britain
1986	World Road Race Championships	Lisbon, Portugal	17th	15 km	50:32
1987	World Championships	Rome, Italy	23rd (h)	10,000 m	33:54.99
1987	World Road Race Championships	Monte Carlo, Monaco	44th	15 km	52:24
1988	World Road Race Championships	Adelaide, Australia	3rd	15 km	53:00
1988	Olympic Games	Seoul, South Korea	32nd	Marathon	2:36:57
(h) Indicates overall position in qualifying heats
