= 1980 WAAA Championships =

British athletics event

- Dates: 15–16 August
- Host city: London
- Venue: Crystal Palace National Sports Centre
- Level: Senior
- Type: Outdoor

The 1980 WAAA Championships sponsored by Sunsilk, were the national track and field championships for women in the United Kingdom.

The event was held at the Crystal Palace National Sports Centre, London, from 15 to 16 August 1980.

The 5,000 metres and 10,000 metres events were introduced to the Championships for the first time, although they were considered non-Championship events in 1980.

== Results ==
Event	Gold		Silver		Bronze	
100 metres	Kathy Smallwood	11.45	Bev Goddard	11.51	Heather Hunte	11.59
200 metres	Kathy Smallwood	23.14	(Republic of Ireland) Patricia Amond	23.82	Rosalee Wilson	23.94
400 metres	Michelle Probert	51.94	Joslyn Hoyte-Smith	51.98	Verona Elder	53.05
800 metres	(Scotland) Anne Clarkson	2:01.89	Jane Finch	2:04.15	Julie Asgill	2:05.79
1,500 metres	Gillian Dainty	4:14.02	Bernadette Madigan	4:15.40	Sandra Arthurton	4:15.74
3,000 metres	(Republic of Ireland) Regina Joyce	9:13.82	(Republic of Ireland) Vera Duffy	9:25.08	Shireen Samy	9:32.85
5,000 metres	Sue Hutton	16:13.7	Susan Simpkin	17:19.1	Janette Board	17:33.2
10,000 metres	Christine Readdy	34:32.0	Alison Blake	35:27.0	Bronwen Smith	36:36.0
marathon+	Joyce Smith	2:41:22	Gillian Adams	2:42:14	Carol Gould	2:43:50
100 metres hurdles	Shirley Strong	13.57	Yvette Wray	13.70	Judy Livermore	13.86
400 metres hurdles	Sue Morley	58.76	Val Lemoignan	59.38	Deborah Skerritt	59.72
High jump	Ann-Marie Devally	1.88	(Scotland) Moira Maguire	1.82	Diana Elliott; Sarah Rowe	1.79; 1.79
Long jump	Sue Reeve	6.55	Sue Hearnshaw	6.39	Carol Earlington	6.37
Shot put	Judy Oakes	16.85	(Wales) Venissa Head	16.78	Vanessa Redford	13.89
Discus throw	Lesley Mallin	51.24	(Wales) Venissa Head	50.64	Gwen Bird	47.56
Javelin	Tessa Sanderson	64.08	Fatima Whitbread	56.24	Jeanette Rose	53.74
Pentathlon ++	Sue Longden	4409 NR	Yvette Wray	4278	Judy Livermore	4259
5,000 metres walk	Irene Bateman	24:09.0	(Sweden) Siw Gustavsson	24:27.6	(Sweden) Britt Holmqvist	24:49.6
10,000 metres walk	Carol Tyson	49:30.4	Irene Bateman	50:38.8	Karen Eden	53:46.8

- + Held on 3 August at London
- ++ Held on 24 May at the Alexander Stadium

== See also ==
- 1980 AAA Championships
