= Martin Rush =

British athlete

Personal information
- Born: 25 December 1964 (age 61) Horncastle, Lincolnshire, England
- Height: 168 cm (5 ft 6 in)
- Weight: 51 kg (112 lb)

Sport
- Sport: Athletics
- Event: Racewalking
- Club: Lakeland RWC

Martin Anthony Gavin Rush (born 25 December 1964) is a British racewalker who competed at the 1992 Summer Olympics.

== Biography ==
Rush finished second behind Ian McCombie in the 10,000 metres walk event at the 1984 AAA Championships.

He represented England in the 30 km walk event, at the 1986 Commonwealth Games in Edinburgh, Scotland.

Rush became the British 10,000 metres walk champion after winning the British AAA Championships title at the 1992 AAA Championships. Shortly afterwards he represented Great Britain at the 1992 Olympic Games in Barcelona, in the men's 20 kilometres walk.
