= 1985 WAAA Championships =

British athletics event

- Dates: 26–27 July
- Host city: Birmingham
- Venue: Alexander Stadium
- Level: Senior
- Type: Outdoor

The 1985 WAAA Championships sponsored by the Trustee Savings Bank, were the national track and field championships for women in the United Kingdom.

The event was held at the Alexander Stadium, Birmingham for the first time since switching from Crystal Palace. The competition took place from 26 to 27 July 1985.

== Results ==
Event	Gold		Silver		Bronze	
100 metres	Heather Oakes	11.37	Kathy Cook	11.41	Pippa Windle	11.60
200 metres	Kathy Cook	23.39	Georgina Oladapo	23.74	Pat Beckford	23.74
400 metres	(Australia) Maree Chapman	51.51	Linda Keough	52.52	Tracy Lawton	52.95
800 metres	Christina Boxer	2:00.60	(Scotland) Anne Purvis	2:02.41	Suzanne Morley	2:02.79
1,500 metres	Julie-Ann Laughton	4:15.08	(Republic of Ireland) Mary McKenna	4:16.13	Kathryn Carter	4:16.55
3,000 metres	Zola Budd	8:50.50	Carole Bradford	9:06.30	Jill Clarke	9:19.20
5,000 metres	(Republic of Ireland) Monica Joyce	16:16.58	Alison Hollington	16:19.97	Sally Ellis	16:24.16
10,000 metres	Sue Crehan	33:53.3	Sally Ellis	34:50.5	(Scotland) Karen MacLeod	35:57.7
marathon+	Sarah Rowell	2:28:06	Sally-Ann Hales	2:28:38	Ann Ford	2:31:19
100 metres hurdles	(Australia) Glynis Nunn	13.27	Kim Hagger	13.35	Wendy Jeal	13.38
400 metres hurdles	Yvette Wray	57.86	Aileen Mills	58.69	Carol Dawkins	58.84
High jump	Diana Davies	1.89	(Scotland) Jayne Barnetson; Kim Hagger	1.80; 1.80	n/a	
Long jump	Joyce Oladapo	6.56	Sharon Bowie	6.11	Mary Berkeley	6.10
Shot put	Judy Oakes	17.57	Myrtle Augee	16.96	Yvonne Hanson-Nortey	15.16
Discus throw	Julia Avis	50.82	Karen Pugh	49.48	Judy Oakes	48.70
Javelin	Tessa Sanderson	66.38	(Scotland) Diane Royle	61.86	Anna Lockton	52.38
Heptathlon ++	(Australia) Ann Turnbull	5289	Charmaine Johnson	5177	(Scotland) Valerie Walsh	5174
5,000 metres walk	Virginia Birch	23:53.47	Helen Elleker	24:25.81	Lisa Langford	24:53.04
10,000 metres walk	Helen Elleker	51:22.3	Lisa Langford	52:02.9	Karen Nipper	52:57.4

- + 1985 London Marathon (Best placed British athletes)
- ++ Held on 20 & 21 July at Bournemouth

== See also ==
- 1985 AAA Championships
