= Neil Horsfield =

Welsh athlete

Personal information
- Nationality: British (Welsh)
- Born: 7 December 1966 (age 59) Lancashire, England

Sport
- Sport: Athletics
- Event: Middle-distance
- Club: Newport Harriers

John "Neil" Horsfield (born 7 December 1966) is a Welsh former athlete who competed mainly in the 800 metres and 1500 metres.

== Biography ==
Horsfield won a silver medal in the 1500m at the 1985 European Junior Championships, before going on to represent Wales at two Commonwealth Games and Great Britain at the 1990 European Championships.

Horsfield won the 1990 AAA Championships 1500m title and twice won the UK Championship 1500m title (1987, 1990). His Mile run best of 3:54.39 (1986) still stands as Welsh record. His 1500m best of 3:35.08 (1990) stood as the Welsh record for more than 30 years, before Jake Heyward broke it in June 2021 with a time of 3:33.99.

== International competitions ==
Year	Competition	Venue	Position	Event	Notes
Representing Great Britain / Wales
1984	World Cross Country Championships (Junior race)	East Rutherford, United States	46th	8 km	22:43
1985	World Cross Country Championships (Junior race)	Lisbon, Portugal	24th	8.2 km	24:19
1985	European Junior Championships	Cottbus, Germany	2nd	1500 m	3:45.39
1986	Commonwealth Games	Edinburgh, United Kingdom	9th	1500 m	3:57.08
1990	Commonwealth Games	Auckland, New Zealand	15th (sf)	800 m	1:49.93
1990	Commonwealth Games	Auckland, New Zealand	16th (h)	1500 m	3:49.34
1990	European Championships	Split, Yugoslavia	9th	1500 m	3:40.59
1990	(#) Indicates overall position in qualifying heats (h) or semifinals (sf)				
