= Susan Morley =

British athlete

Susan Chick née Morley
Personal information
- Nationality: British (English)
- Born: 6 January 1960 (age 66) Swinton, West Riding of Yorkshire, England

Sport
- Sport: Athletics
- Event: 400 metres hurdles
- Club: Hickleton AC

Susan Anita Jayne Chick (née Morley, born 6 January 1960) is a British former athlete who competed in the 400 metres hurdles. She finished seventh in the 400 metres hurdles final at the 1983 World Championships. She also represented Great Britain in the women's 400 metres hurdles at the 1984 Los Angeles Olympics, and England at the 1982 Commonwealth Games. Her sister, Kay Morley-Brown, is also a former international hurdler.

== Biography ==
Born in Swinton, then in the West Riding of Yorkshire, Morley won the British 400 metres hurdles title at the 1980 WAAA Championships in 58.76 secs. In 1982, she won the UK Championships title in 57.10, retained her AAA title in 57.31, and ended the season finishing fourth in the final at the 1982 Commonwealth Games in 57.57.

Morley won her second UK title in 1983 in 56.67 secs, before going on to finish seventh in the final of the 400 metres hurdles at the 1983 World Championships in Helsinki in 56.04 secs, to break Christine Warden's 1979 British record of 56.06. Morley's record was broken in 1988 by Sally Gunnell. In 1984, following injury during the winter season, she reached the semifinals at the Los Angeles Olympics, running 56.67.

Morley's final year ranked in the UK top three was 1985, when under her married name of Sue Chick, she ranked third with a season's best of 58.15 secs. As of 2018, her best time of 56.04 secs, ranks her 13th on the UK all-time list.

== International competitions ==
Year	Competition	Venue	Position	Notes
Representing England
1982	Commonwealth Games	Brisbane, Australia	4th	57.57
Representing Great Britain
1983	World Championships	Helsinki, Finland	7th	56.04
1983	European Cup	London, United Kingdom	3rd	56.36
1984	Olympic Games	Los Angeles, United States	11th (sf)	56.67
(sf) Indicates overall position in semifinal round

=== National titles ===
- AAA Championships (1980, 1982)
- UK Championships (1982, 1983)
