= Colin Rattigan =

British athlete

Personal information
- Nationality: British
- Born: 12 November 1961 (age 63) Jamaica

Sport
- Sport: Bobsleigh

Colin Rattigan (born 12 November 1961) is a British bobsledder and long jumper. He competed at the 1988 Winter Olympics and the 1992 Winter Olympics. He won the 1981 national long jump title.
