= Gowry Retchakan =

British Sri Lankan hurdler

Personal information
- Nationality: British Sri Lankan
- Born: 21 June 1960 (age 66) Paddington, London
- Height: 158 cm (5 ft 2 in)
- Weight: 45 kg (99 lb)

Sport
- Sport: Athletics
- Event: hurdles
- Club: Thurrock Harriers
Medal record
Athletics
Representing Great Britain / EUR
IAAF World Cup
Silver medal – second place	1992 Havana	400 m hurdles
Representing England
Commonwealth Games
Silver medal – second place	1998 Kuala Lumpur	400 m hurdles

Selvagowry Retchakan-Müller, (née Vardakumar, formerly Hodge, born 21 June 1960) is an English former track and field athlete who competed in the 400 metres hurdles. She represented Great Britain at the 1992 Olympic Games in Barcelona, and won silver medals at the 1992 IAAF World Cup and the 1998 Commonwealth Games. She won five AAA Championships titles and two UK Championship titles. She was ranked in the world's top ten at 400 metres hurdles in both 1991 and 1992.

== Biography ==
Retchakan was born in Paddington, London, England, to Sri Lankan parents. She was a member of Thurrock Harriers. In 1982, representing Sri Lanka, she finished sixth in the 100 metres hurdles at the Asian Games. She emerged as one of the UK's leading 400 m hurdlers in the late 1980s. In 1989, she finished third at the AAA Championships in 57.17, and went on to be the UK's long standing second ranked 400 m hurdler to Sally Gunnell. In 1990, after finishing second at the UK Championships in 58.23, she won the first of five AAAs National titles, winning in 57.14, to earn selection for the European Championships, where she was eliminated in the heats in 57.03.

In 1991, Retchakan retained her AAAs title in 56.67. At the World Championships in Tokyo. she ran below 55 seconds for the first time, with 54.95 in the heats, improving to 54.88 in the semi-finals, narrowly missing the final. The time ranked her tenth fastest in the world for 1991. In 1992, Retchakan won the UK title in 55.42 and retained the AAAs title in 55.04, to earn Olympic selection. At the Barcelona Olympics, she ran her lifetime best of 54.63 in the semi-finals, to again narrowly miss the final. She was unfortunate to miss out, as she was the seventh fastest athlete overall from the two semis. A month after the Olympics, she was selected to represent Europe at the IAAF World Cup in Havana. She ran 55.66, to finish second behind Sandra Farmer-Patrick and ahead of Margarita Ponomaryova. She was the ninth fastest in the world for 1992.

Retchakan retained the UK 400 m hurdles title in 1993, running 56.62 and reached the semi-finals of the World Championships in Stuttgart, running 55.96. In 1994, she won her fourth AAAs title in 57.08 and went on to reach the 400 m hurdles finals at both the European Championships and the Commonwealth Games. At the Europeans in Helsinki, she finished eighth in 56.05. Then in Victoria, at the Commonwealth Games, she finished fifth in the final, in 56.69. She won her fifth (and final) AAAs 400 metres hurdles title in 1995, in 57.18. However, she declined selection for the World Championships. At the 1996 British Olympic Trials, she was sixth, failing to earn Olympic selection.

In 1998, at the age of 38, Retchakan had one of her best career results, when she won a silver medal at the Commonwealth Games in Kuala Lumpur. She finished behind Andrea Blackett in 55.25, her fastest time for six years. Having ranked second in the UK for five straight years to Sally Gunnell (1990–94) then third in 1995, she at last achieved the UK number one ranking.

As of 2021, Retchakan's best of 54.63, ranks her seventh on the UK all-time list. She also holds the UK masters records in the W35 and W40 categories. Her 55.25 in 1998, was the second fastest time ever by a veteran woman, age 35+, after Marina Stepanova. In 2000, she broke the world age 40+ record with 58.3.

== Personal life ==
Retchakan is married to Paul Joachim Müller. She was formerly married to the athletics statistician Ian Hodge. Her son is Sunny Hodge.

== Competition record ==
Year	Competition	Venue	Position	Event	Notes
Representing Sri Lanka
1982	Asian Games	Delhi, India	6th	100 m hurdles	14.??
Representing Great Britain
1990	European Championships	Split, Yugoslavia	17th (h)	400 m hurdles	57.03
1991	World Championships	Tokyo, Japan	semi-final	400 m hurdles	54.88
1992	Olympic Games	Barcelona, Spain	semi-final	400 m hurdles	54.63
1992	World Cup	Havana, Cuba	2nd	400 m hurdles	55.66
1993	World Championships	Stuttgart, Germany	semi-final	400 m hurdles	55.96
1994	European Championships	Helsinki, Finland	8th	400 m hurdles	56.05
Representing England
1994	Commonwealth Games	Victoria, Canada	5th	400 m hurdles	56.69
1998	Commonwealth Games	Kuala Lumpur, Malaysia	2nd	400 m hurdles	55.25
National Championships
1989	AAA Championships	Birmingham, UK	3rd	400 m hurdles	57.17
1990	UK Championships	Cardiff, UK	2nd	400 m hurdles	58.23
1990	AAA Championships	Birmingham, UK	1st	400 m hurdles	57.14
1991	AAA Championships	Birmingham, UK	1st	400 m hurdles	55.67
1992	UK Championships	Sheffield, UK	1st	400 m hurdles	55.42
1992	AAA Championships	Birmingham, UK	1st	400 m hurdles	55.04
1993	UK Championships	London, UK	1st	400 m hurdles	56.62
1994	AAA Championships	Sheffield, UK	1st	400 m hurles	57.08
1995	AAA Championships	Birmingham, UK	1st	400 m hurdles	57.18
1996	AAA Championships	Birmingham, UK	6th	400 mhurdles	57.??
1998	AAA Championships	Birmingham, UK	2nd	400 m hurdles	56.57
