= Brian Adams (race walker) =

British racewalker (born 1949)

Personal information
- Nationality: British (English)
- Born: 13 March 1949 (age 77) Leicester, England
- Height: 183 cm (6 ft 0 in)
- Weight: 67 kg (148 lb)
- Spouse: Joy Hollins (1973-present)

Sport
- Sport: Athletics
- Event: Racewalking
- Club: Leicester Walking Club

Brian Adams (born 13 March 1949) is a British retired racewalker and coach who competed at the 1976 Summer Olympics.

== Walking career ==
Adams won his first RWA Young Athletes Road Walk Championship in the Junior Men's category in 1969. Some of his career achievements include winning the RWA 50 Kilometres Road Walk Race in 1977 in Milton Keynes and winning the RWA Men's Long Distance Road Walk Championship in 1983, in which he completed 100 kilometres in 10:13:16.

While he is best known for 20 kilometres, achieving his personal best of 1:27:46 in 1975, he won the 1984 Leicester RWA 100 miles in 17:39:28, beating long-distance specialists such as John Cannell from the Isle of Man.

Adams came second in the RWA Men's 10 Miles Road Walk Championships in the years 1975 in Southwick, 1976 in York, 1978 in London and 1979 in York.

Adams was a five-times consecutive British 10,000 metres walking champion after first winning the British AAA Championships title at the 1975 AAA Championships through to and including the 1979 AAA Championships.

Adams competed in the men's 20 kilometres walk at the 1976 Summer Olympics, coming in 11th place with a time of 1:30:46. At these Olympics, he shared a room with Paul Nihill, who gave him the nickname "Bernie". He represented England in the 30 kilometres walk event at the 1978 Commonwealth Games in Edmonton, Alberta, Canada, where he placed 4th with a time of 2:29:42.

== Life after walking ==
After retiring from competing, Adams became a coach at City of Sheffield AC with a career lasting over 25 years, winning Yorkshire and Humberside Coach of the Year award in 2017. Adams now lives in Sheffield, where he is a trustee of a local Methodist Church and of the South Yorkshire Schools' Athletic Association, where he also serves as the Race Walking Secretary.

== Personal life ==
In 1973, he married Joy Hollins and the couple have two sons together, Nathan and Simeon, and five grandchildren. He trained his son Nathan who went on to win the RWA Young Athletes Road Walk Championships in 1999 and the RWA's Men's 35 Kilometres Road Walk Championships in 2004. Adams is a Christian and is well known for his faith, signing with the phrase "Walk with Jesus" throughout his career.
