= Jenny Kelly (athlete) =

English heptathlete

Personal information
- Nationality: British (English)
- Born: 20 June 1970

Sport
- Sport: Athletics
- Event: heptathlon
- Club: Peterborough & Nene Valley

Jennifer Kelly (born 20 June 1970) is an English former heptathlete.

== Biography ==
Kelly represented Great Britain at the 1988 World Junior Championships.

Kelly finished third behind Joanne Mulliner in the heptathlon event at the 1990 AAA Championships before competing in the 1990 European Championships.

She finished second behind Clova Court at the AAA Championships at the 1991 AAA Championships.

At the 1994 Commonwealth Games in Victoria, Canada, she represented England in the heptathlon event, she finished fifth at the 1994 Commonwealth Games.

Her heptathlon best of 5826 points in 1994, still ranks her in the UK all-time top 20. She finished second again at the AAA Championships, this time behind Emma Beales at the 1995 AAA Championships.

== International competitions ==
Year	Competition	Venue	Position	Notes
Representing Great Britain
1988	World Junior Championships	Sudbury, Canada	10th	5459
1990	European Championships	Split, Yugoslavia	—	DNF
Representing England
1994	Commonwealth Games	Victoria, Canada	5th	5658
