= Stewart Faulkner =

British athlete (born 1969)

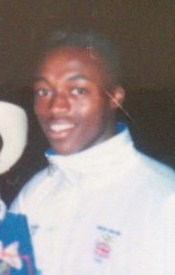
- Faulkner in 1988

Personal information
- Nationality: English
- Born: 19 February 1969 (age 56) Northampton, England
- Height: 193 cm (6 ft 4 in)
- Weight: 86 kg (190 lb)

Sport
- Sport: Athletics
- Event: Long jump
- Club: Birchfield Harriers

Stewart St. Ledger Faulkner (born 19 February 1969) is a male British retired athlete who competed in the men's long jump and appeared at the 1988 Summer Olympics.

== Biography ==
He was born in Northampton, Northamptonshire to parents of Jamaican-Cuban descent and was a member of Birchfield Harriers. Although his career was plagued by severe tarsal tunnel syndrome (a trapped nerve in his take off foot), he achieved relative success early in his track life.

After winning a silver medal at the European Junior Championships in Birmingham in 1987, he went on to represent Great Britain at the 1988 Summer Olympics in Seoul, South Korea, where he just missed reaching the final. The following year he established himself as No. 6 in the Track and Field News IAAF Long Jump World Merit rankings. He represented England in the long jump event, at the 1990 Commonwealth Games in Auckland, New Zealand.

He was a five-times British long jump champion after winning the British AAA Championships title at the 1988 AAA Championships,1989 AAA Championships and 1990 AAA Championships, and UK Athletics Championships in 1987 and 1992.

Despite the premature end to his international career, Faulkner was described as an exceptional and precocious talent and still holds national records in the junior indoor and under-23 indoor categories.
