= List of British champions in 10,000 metres =

The British 10,000 metres athletics champions covers three competitions; the current British Athletics Championships which was founded in 2007, the preceding AAA Championships (1880–2006) and the UK Athletics Championships which existed from 1977 until 1997 and ran concurrently with the AAA Championships.

Where an international athlete won the AAA Championships the highest ranking UK athlete is considered the National Champion in this list. Since 2018, the national 10,000m has been incorporated into the elite race at the Night of 10,000m PB event, with the same rule applying where international athletes win the race as in the AAA Championships.

== Past winners ==
AAA Championships 6 miles, mens event only
Year	Men's champion
1932	John Potts
1933	Jack Holden
1934	Jack Holden
1935	Jack Holden
1936	Alec Burns
1937	Alec Burns
1938	Reginald Draper
1939	Samuel Palmer
1946	Jim Peters
1947	Anthony Chivers
1948	Stan Cox
1949	Stan Cox
1950	Frank Aaron
1951	Gordon Pirie
1952	Gordon Pirie
1953	Gordon Pirie
1954	Peter Driver
1955	Ken Norris
1956	Ken Norris
1957	George Knight
1958	Stan Eldon
1959	Stan Eldon
1960	Gordon Pirie
1961	Basil Heatley
1962	Roy Fowler
1963	Ron Hill
1964	Mike Bullivant
1965	Ron Hill
1966	Bruce Tulloh
1967	Lachie Stewart
1968	Tim Johnston
10,000 metres
1969	Dick Taylor
1970	Dave Bedford
1971	Dave Bedford
1972	Dave Bedford
1973	Dave Bedford
1974	Dave Bedford
1975	Dave Black
1976	Keith Penny

AAA Championships/WAAA Championships & UK Athletics Championships dual championships era 1977-1987
Year	AAA Men	Year	WAAA Women	Year	UK Men	UK Women
1977	Brendan Foster	1977	nc	1977	Ian Stewart	nc
1978	Brendan Foster	1978	nc	1978	Dave Black	nc
1979	Dave Murphy	1979	nc	1979	Dave Black	nc
1980	Nick Rose	1980	Christine Readdy	1980	Geoff Smith	nc
1981	Barry Smith	1981	Kathryn Binns	1981	Dave Black	nc
1982	Julian Goater	1982	Margaret Boddy	1982	Julian Goater	nc
1983	Charlie Spedding	1983	Barbara King	1983	Steve Binns	nc
1984	Steve Jones	1984	Priscilla Welch	1984	Nick Rose	nc
1985	Karl Harrison	1985	Sue Crehan	1985	Mark Scrutton	nc
1986	Jon Solly	1986	Jill Clarke	1986	Karl Harrison	Liz Lynch
1987	Steve Harris	1987	Sue Crehan	1987	Nick Rose	nc
1988	Steve Binns	1988	Angela Tooby	1988	David Lewis+	nc

AAA Championships
Year	Men AAA	Women AAA
1989	Eamonn Martin	Jill Hunter
1990	Richard Nerurkar	Andrea Wallace
1991	Carl Thackery	Annette Bell
1992	Eamonn Martin	Andrea Wallace
1993	Paul Evans	Vikki McPherson
1994	Rob Denmark	Zara Hyde
1995	Gary Staines	Jill Hunter
1996	Rob Denmark	Louise Watson

AAA Championships & UK Athletics Championships dual championships era
Year	Men AAA	Women AAA	Year	Men UK	Women UK
1997	Mark Steinle	nc	1997	Ian Hudspith	Vikki McPherson

AAA Championships second era 1998-2006
Year	Men's champion	Women's champion
1998	Dermot Donnelly	Tara Krzywicki
1999	Paul Evans	Beverley Jenkins
2000	Andres Jones	Birhan Dagne
2001	Glynn Tromans	Penny Thackray
2002	Rob Denmark	Hayley Yelling
2003	Karl Keska	Hayley Yelling
2004	Mark O'Dowd	Kathy Butler
2005	Gavin Thompson	Kathy Butler
2006	Dominic Bannister	Hayley Yelling

British Athletics Championships 2007 to present
Year	Men's champion	Women's champion
2007	Phil Nicholls	Jo Pavey
2008	Antony Ford	Jo Pavey
2009	Andy Vernon	Claire Hallissey
2010	James Walsh	Jo Pavey
2011	James Walsh	Sonia Samuels
2012	Michael Skinner	Caryl Jones
2013	Andrew Lemoncello	Alyson Dixon
2014	Andy Vernon	Jo Pavey
2015	Jonathan Mellor	Rhona Auckland
2016	Ross Millington	Jessica Martin
2017	Andy Vernon	Beth Potter
2018	Alex Yee	Charlotte Arter
2019	Ben Connor	Stephanie Twell
2020–2021, not held due to the COVID-19 pandemic
2022	Sam Atkin	Jessica Judd
2023	Andrew Butchart	Jessica Warner-Judd
2024	Patrick Dever	Megan Keith
2025	Emile Cairess	Megan Keith
2026	Joe Wigfield	Izzy Fry

- nc = not contested
