= Helen Elleker =

English track and field athlete

Personal information
- Nationality: British (English)
- Born: 21 March 1956 (age 69)

Sport
- Sport: Athletics
- Event: racewalking
- Club: Sheffield; Derbyshire & South Yorkshire

Helen Elleker (born 21 March 1956) is a former female track and field athlete who competed for England in the walking events.

== Biography ==
Elleker finished third behind Canadian Ann Peel in the 5,000m walk event at the 1983 WAAA Championships.

The following year Elleker became the British 10,000 metres walk champion after winning the British WAAA Championships title at the 1984 WAAA Championships and would go on to win it again at the 1985 WAAA Championships and the 1986 WAAA Championships, in addition to becoming the 5,000 metres champion in 1986.

Elleker represented England in the 10,000 metres walk event, at the 1990 Commonwealth Games in Auckland, New Zealand.
