= Phil Embleton =

British racewalker

Personal information
- Nationality: British (English)
- Born: 20 December 1948 Hackney, London, England
- Died: 22 May 1974 (aged 25) London, England
- Height: 185 cm (6 ft 1 in)
- Weight: 70 kg (154 lb)

Sport
- Sport: Athletics
- Event: Racewalking
- Club: Metropolitan WC

Philip Bruce Embleton (20 December 1948 – 22 May 1974) was a British racewalker who competed at the 1972 Summer Olympics.

== Biography ==
Embleton finished second behind Roger Mills in the 3km walk event and runner-up behind Paul Nihill in the 10km walk event at the 1969 AAA Championships. Embleton would podium three more times in the AAA Championships 3km walk in 1970, 1971 and 1972. He did however became the British 10,000m walk champion twice, after winning the titles at the 1971 AAA Championships and 1972 AAA Championships.

At the 1972 Olympics Games in Munich, he represented Great Britain in the men's 20 kilometres walk.

His career and life was cut short after he died of leukemia at St Bartholomew's Hospital in 1974 at the age of 25.
