= Steve Barry (race walker) =

Welsh race walker (born 1950)

Personal information
- Nationality: British (Welsh)
- Born: 25 October 1950 (age 75) Cardiff, Wales
- Height: 170 cm (5 ft 7 in)
- Weight: 62 kg (9 st 11 lb)

Sport
- Sport: Athletics
- Event: Racewalking
- Club: Cardiff AAC; Roath Walking Club

Steven John Barry (born 25 October 1950) is a retired Welsh race walker aho competed at the 1984 Summer Olympics.

== Biography ==
Barry, born in Cardiff, was a member of the Cardiff Amateur Athletic Club and Roath Walking Club.

He became the British 3,000 metres walk champion after winning the British AAA Championships title at the 1980 AAA Championships and was three-times 10,000 metres walk champion after winning the AAAs for three consecutive years from 1981 to 1983.

Barry won the gold medal in the 30 km road walk at the 1982 Commonwealth Games representing Wales.

Barry represented Great Britain at the 1984 Los Angeles Olympics in the 20 km walk, finishing 24th. Barry retired from the sport through injury following the Olympics.

Barry won the BBC Wales Sports Personality of the Year in 1982.

== International competitions ==
Year	Competition	Venue	Position	Notes
1982	Commonwealth Games	Brisbane, Australia	1st	30 km
1984	Olympic Games	Los Angeles, United States	24th	20 km
