= Louise Miller (athlete) =

English high jumper

Louise Gittens née Miller
Personal information
- Nationality: British (English)
- Born: 9 March 1960 (age 65) Saffron Walden, England
- Height: 183 cm (6 ft 0 in)
- Weight: 63 kg (139 lb)

Sport
- Sport: Athletics
- Event: high jump
- Club: Chelmsford Athletics Club

Louise Ann Gittens, née Miller (born 9 March 1960) is a retired female high jumper from England, who competed at the 1980 Summer Olympics.

== Biography ==
Miller, born in Saffron Walden, Essex, finished third behind Carol Mathers in the high jump event at the 1978 AAA Championships.

At the 1980 Olympics Games in Moscow, she represented Great Britain, finishing in 11th place (1.85 m) in the overall-rankings. She set her personal best (1.94 metres) in 1980.

Miller left athletics and married teacher and rugby player Roy Gittens before making a comeback under her married name of Gittens and winning the 1985 Southern Counties title. In 1989, eleven years after her last podium place at the AAA Championships, she finished third again, this time behind Diana Davies at the 1989 AAA Championships.
