= Darrell Stone =

British athlete

Personal information
- Nationality: British (English)
- Born: 2 February 1968 (age 57)

Sport
- Sport: Athletics
- Event: walking events
- Club: Steyning AC

Darrell Richard Stone (born 2 February 1968), is a male former athlete who competed for England.

== Biography ==
Stone is a three times British 10,000 metres walk champion after winning the 1993 UK Athletics Championships, 1994 AAA Championships and 1995 AAA Championships.

He represented England in the 30 km walk event, at the 1994 Commonwealth Games in Victoria, Canada. Four years later he represented England in the 20 km walk event, at the 1998 Commonwealth Games in Kuala Lumpur, Malaysia.
