= Verity Snook-Larby =

Scottish racewalker

Verity Snook née Larby
Personal information
- Nationality: British (Scottish)
- Born: 13 November 1970 (age 55)

Sport
- Sport: Athletics
- Event: race walking
- Club: AFD

Verity Beatrice Snook, née Larby (born 13 November 1970) is a female former race walker from Scotland, who also represented Great Britain during her career.

== Biography ==
Larby who trained at Aldershot, Farnham & District AC, became the British 10,000 metres walk champion, after winning the British AAA Championships title at the 1993 AAA Championships. The following year she retained her 10,000 metres title and also became the British 5000 metres walk champion at the 1994 AAA Championships.

At the 1994 Commonwealth Games in Victoria, Canada she represented Scotland in the women's 10 kilometres walk event.

== Achievements ==
Year	Competition	Venue	Position	Event	Notes
Representing the United Kingdom and Scotland
1993	World Championships	Stuttgart, Germany	29th	10 km	47:54
1994	Commonwealth Games	Victoria, Canada	7th	10 km	46:06
1994	European Championships	Helsinki, Finland	23rd	10 km	47:23
1997	World Race Walking Cup	Poděbrady, Czech Republic	94th	10 km	50:14

== Personal life ==
Her son Chris Snook won the UK Athletics Championships men's 5000m race walking title, in Manchester, in July 2023.
