= Vicky Lupton =

English racewalker (born 1972)

Personal information
- Nationality: British (English)
- Born: 17 April 1972 (age 54) Sheffield, West Riding of Yorkshire, England
- Height: 160 cm (5 ft 3 in)
- Weight: 57 kg (126 lb)

Sport
- Sport: Athletics
- Event: race walk
- Club: Sheffield Road Walkers Club

Victoria ("Vicky") Anne Lupton (born 17 April 1972 in Sheffield, West Riding of Yorkshire) is a retired female race walker from England who twice competed for Great Britain at the Summer Olympics: 1992 and 1996.

== Biography ==
Lupton finished second behind Betty Sworowski in the 5,000m and 10,000m walk events at the 1988 AAA Championships. She became the British 10,000 metres walk champion after winning the British AAA Championships title at the 1990 AAA Championships, 1995 and 1996 and was four times 5,000m walk champion in 1992, 1993, 1996 and 1999.

At the 1992 Olympic Games in Atlanta, Lupton represented Great Britain in the 10km walk event. She represented England in the 10 km walk event, at the 1994 Commonwealth Games in Victoria, Canada.

Lupton set her personal best (45.19 minutes) in the 10 km race in 1995. Lupton represented England, at the 1998 Commonwealth Games in Kuala Lumpur, Malaysia.

== International competitions ==
Year	Competition	Venue	Position	Event	Notes
Representing Great Britain / England
1990	World Junior Championships	Plovdiv, Bulgaria	5th	5000m	22:51.86
1991	World Cup	San Jose, United States	39th	10 km	48:57
1992	Olympic Games	Barcelona, Spain	—	10 km	DSQ
1993	World Cup	Monterrey, Mexico	67th	10 km	53:39
1993	World Championships	Stuttgart, Germany	23rd	10 km	47:03
1994	Commonwealth Games	Victoria, Canada	5th	10 km	45:48
1994	European Championships	Helsinki, Finland	20th	10 km	46:30
1995	World Cup	Beijing, China	50th	10 km	47:04
1996	Olympic Games	Atlanta, United States	33rd	10 km	47:05
1997	World Cup	Poděbrady, Czech Republic	58th	10 km	47:16
1998	Commonwealth Games	Kuala Lumpur, Malaysia	7th	10 km	48:27
