= Lloyd Cowan =

British athlete and coach (1962–2021)

Personal information
- Nationality: British (English)
- Born: 8 July 1962 Hackney, London, England
- Died: 11 January 2021 (aged 58)

Sport
- Sport: Athletics
- Event: hurdles
- Club: Shaftesbury Barnet Harriers

Lloyd Cowan MBE (8 July 1962 – 11 January 2021) was a British track and field athlete and coach.

== Biography ==
=== Athletics ===
Cowan specialised in the 110 and 400 metres hurdles, but was better known as a coach.

Cowan was selected for the 1984 Los Angeles Olympics, but he could not go because of illness. He did however represent England in the 110 metres hurdles event, at the 1994 Commonwealth Games in Victoria, Canada

Cowan finished third on three occasions at the AAA Championships in 1994, 1995 and 1999.

=== Coaching ===
He retired from athletics at the age of 39 and went on to coach 18 athletes including; Christine Ohuruogu at Newham and Essex Beagles A.C., the former 400 metres Olympic, World and Commonwealth Champion; Simeon Williamson, the former British 100 metres champion; and Andy Turner, the former European, and Commonwealth 110 metres hurdles champion.

He was appointed MBE in the 2015 Birthday Honours. On 11 January 2021, it was announced that Cowan had died at the age of 58 from COVID complications.
