= Maggie Lynes =

British athletics competitor (born 1963)

Personal information
- Nationality: British (English)
- Born: 19 February 1963 (age 63)

Sport
- Sport: Athletics and Weightlifting
- Event: shot put
- Club: Croydon Harriers

Margaret Tracey Lynes (born 19 February 1963) is a female English former Shot putter and Weightlifter.

== Athletics career ==
Lynes represented England in the shot put at the Commonwealth Games in 1994 and 1998, and Great Britain at the 1994 European Championships.

She won a total of 22 medals at AAA, UK and AAA Indoor Championships between 1986 and 1998, including twice winning the AAA Indoor Championships title (1993/94), finishing second at the 1993 UK Championships, and second at the 1995 AAA Championships.

== Weightlifting career ==
Lynes also competed for Great Britain in weightlifting, and was one of the pioneers of women's competitive weightlifting. She was a triple gold medallist at the first EEC weightlifting championships and went on to win a total of six European Championship medals, including two gold medals in the Clean and Jerk. She narrowly missed a medal in the Clean and Jerk at the 1989 World championships, finishing fourth by virtue of a slightly heavier body-weight.

Lynes went on to compete for England in weightlifting at the 2002 Commonwealth Games, where she finished 6th, becoming the first English athlete to compete in two different sports at the Commonwealth Games.

She was appointed England team manager for the weightlifting squad at the 2010 and 2014 Commonwealth Games.

== International competitions ==
Year	Competition	Venue	Position	Notes
Representing Great Britain
1994	European Championships	Helsinki, Finland	17th (q)	16.16 m
Representing England
1994	Commonwealth Games	Victoria, Canada	6th	16.23 m
Representing England
1998	Commonwealth Games	Kuala Lumpur, Malaysia	7th	15.18m
Representing England
2002	Commonwealth Games	Manchester, England	6th	175 kg
