= Abi Ekoku =

English rugby league footballer & Commonwealth Games athlete

Personal information
- Full name: Abagi Bienose Ekoku
- Born: 13 April 1966 (age 60)

Playing information
- Position: Wing, Centre
Club
Years	Team	Pld	T	G	FG	P
1993–95	London Crusaders	27	15	0	0	60
1995–96	Halifax Blue Sox	29	9	0	0	36
1997–98	Bradford Bulls	28	7	0	0	28
	Total	84	31	0	0	124
- Sports career
- Relatives: Efan Ekoku (brother)
- Sport: Athletics
- Event: Discus throw
- Club: Belgrave Harriers
Medal record
Discus
Representing England
UK Championships
3rd	1989
2nd	1990
1st	1992
British National Championships (AAA)
2nd	1989
1st	1990
2nd	1992

Abagi Bienose Ekoku (born 13 April 1966) is the interim CEO of the RFL, a former professional rugby league footballer and a former track and field athlete in both discus and shot put.

He is due to leave his role at the Rugby Football League at the end of April 2026 in order to take on the role as Chief Executive of St Helens in the Super League.

== Sporting career ==
=== Athletics ===
Ekoku represented Great Britain at the European Athletics Championships and was National Champion in the Discus in 1990 and 1992. He represented England in Discus and Shot Put at the 1990 Commonwealth Games in Auckland, New Zealand.

=== Rugby league ===
Ekoku switched to professional rugby league football for the 1993-4 season and played for six seasons on the wing. He started his rugby league career with the London Crusaders, playing on a part-time basis whilst also lecturing in further education. He was signed by Halifax in July 1995, and played in the inaugural Super League season with the club. He joined the Bradford Bulls in 1997, helping the club win the Super League that year, and also played in the 1997 Challenge Cup against St. Helens at Wembley.

Ekoku announced his retirement from playing in 1998 and enjoyed a successful spell as chairman of the Rugby League Players' Association. He left the post in 1999 and was managing director at the Keighley Cougars before being appointed by the Bradford Bulls as Chief Executive Officer. Ekoku oversaw Bradford from 2000 to 2003 during a golden period in the Club's history, when they won two Super League titles, two Challenge Cup finals and the World Club Championship.

Ekoku returned to the game in 2005 as an anti-doping tutor before being appointed team manager for Great Britain in 2006. He stepped down from this role at the end of 2007 after 10 international fixtures, including the 2006 Gillette Tri-Nations Series and the successful home series against New Zealand in 2007.

After a period as a Business Development & Strategy Consultant in property development and leisure investment, Ekoku once again returned to the sport in March 2025, joining the club-led Strategic Review Panel at the RFL. In October 2025 he was appointed as interim CEO of the RFL, during which time he oversaw the resolution of the administrations of Salford Red Devils and Halifax Panthers, guiding both clubs to new ownership and a return to participation in the Championship. In April 2026, Ekoku was appointed as CEO of St Helens R.F.C.

== Personal life ==
Ekoku's brother Efan is a former professional footballer who represented the Nigeria national football team, and as of 2011 is a football pundit with ESPN.
