= Mark Easton (athlete) =

English racewalker

Personal information
- Nationality: British (English)
- Born: 24 May 1963 (age 62) Surrey, England

Sport
- Sport: Athletics
- Event: Race walk

Mark Jonathan Easton (born 24 May 1963) is a former male track and field athlete who competed for England in the walking events.

== Biography ==
Easton became the British 10,000 metres walk champion after winning the British AAA Championships title at the 1989 AAA Championships and the 1990 AAA Championships.

Easton represented at four consecutive Commonwealth Games; he represented England in the 30Km walk event, at the 1990 Commonwealth Games in Auckland, New Zealand. Four years later he competed once again in the 30 Km walk, representing England at the 1994 Commonwealth Games in Victoria, British Columbia, Canada. At his third Games he stepped up in distance to 50 Km and represented England, at the 1998 Commonwealth Games in Kuala Lumpur, Malaysia. His fourth and final appearance was at the 2002 Commonwealth Games in Manchester.
