= Ian McCombie =

British racewalker

Personal information
- Nationality: British (English)
- Born: 11 January 1961 (age 65) Whitley Bay, England
- Height: 1.82 m (6 ft 0 in)
- Weight: 67 kg (148 lb)

Sport
- Sport: Athletics
- Event: British (English)
- Club: Cambridge Harriers, Bexleyheath
Medal record
Men's athletics
Representing England
Commonwealth Games
Bronze medal – third place	1986 Edinburgh	30 km walk
Bronze medal – third place	1990 Auckland	30 km walk

Ian Peter McCombie (born 11 January 1961) is a British racewalker who competed at the 1984 Summer Olympics and the 1988 Summer Olympics.

== Biography ==
McCombie became the British 10,000m walk champion after winning the AAA Championships title at the 1984 AAA Championships. Shortly afterwards at the 1984 Olympic Games in Los Angeles, he represented Great Britain in the men's 20 kilometres walk event.

At the 1985 AAA Championships MCombie stepped down in distance and became the 3,000m walk British champion. The following year a third AAA title over the 10Km walk ensued, before he represented England and won a bronze medal in the 30 km walk event, at the 1986 Commonwealth Games in Edinburgh, Scotland.

McCombie competed in his second Olympics at the 1988 Olympic Games in Seoul, representing Great Britain in the men's 20 kilometres walk again.

Two years later he represented England and won another bronze medal, at the 1990 Commonwealth Games in Auckland, New Zealand.

Further AAA titles arrived in 1986, 1987, 1988 and 1991 and he also won the UK Athletics Championships in 1985, 1987, 1988, 1989 and 1990. He was captain of British Walking Team and competed in the World Walking Championships of 1981, 1983, 1985, 1987, 1989 and 1991. McCombie also competed in three World Athletics Championships, 1983 (Helsinki), 1987 (Rome) and 1991 (Tokyo), and finishing 9th in 1987.

McCombie became the President of the Cambridge Harriers in 1999. McCombie became a lawyer for Northern law firm Ward Hadaway, working as their Head of Commercial Dispute Resolution in Leeds. His recent cases include successful defence in the long-running Hillsborough Disaster prosecution (May 2021), and recovering £20.8m for Adrian Fewings MBE (September 2021 - see BBC report).President of Leeds Law Society in 2005/6.
