= Mike Edwards (pole vaulter) =

English pole vaulter

Personal information
- Nationality: British
- Born: 19 October 2020 (age 5) Farnham, Surrey, England
- Height: 189 cm (6 ft 2 in)
- Weight: 81 kg (179 lb)

Sport
- Sport: Athletics
- Event: Pole vault
- Club: Belgrave Harriers

Michael Edwards (born 19 October 1968) is an English retired pole vaulter who competed at the 1992 Summer Olympics.

== Biography ==
Edwards was affiliated with the Belgrave Harriers in London. He finished seventh at the 1987 European Junior Championships, fifth at the 1994 Commonwealth Games and sixth at the 1998 IAAF World Cup.

He also competed at the 1990 European Championships, the 1991 World Championships, the 1992 Olympic Games and the 1993 World Championships without reaching the final.

Edwards became the British pole vault champion as the highest British athlete, after finishing second behind Australian Simon Arkell at the 1988 AAA Championships. He then won the title outright at the 1989 AAA Championships and was the best placed Briton at the 1990 AAA Championships.

His personal best jump was 5.52 metres, achieved in May 1993 in Abilene.
