= 1982 UK Athletics Championships =

British athletics event

- Dates: 30 & 31 May
- Host city: Cwmbran, Wales
- Venue: Cwmbran Stadium
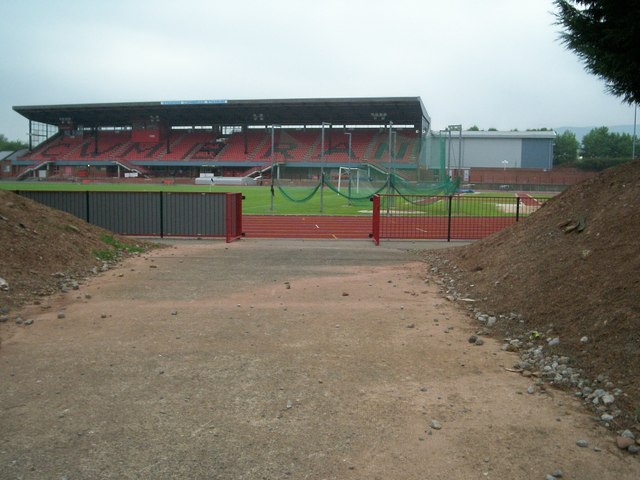
- Level: Senior
- Type: Outdoor

The 1982 UK Athletics Championships sponsored by Guardian Royal Exchange, was the national championship in outdoor track and field for the United Kingdom, held at Cwmbran Stadium, Cwmbran, Wales. It was the second time the event was held in the Welsh town, following on from the 1977 UK Athletics Championships.

It was the sixth edition of the competition limited to British athletes only, launched as an alternative to the AAA Championships, which was open to foreign competitors. However, because the calibre of national competition remained greater at the AAA event, the UK Championships this year were not considered the principal national championship event by some statisticians, such as the National Union of Track Statisticians (NUTS). Many of the athletes below also competed at the 1982 AAA Championships.

== Summary ==
The women's 5000 metres race walk was dropped from the programme for this championship.

David Ottley extended his unbeaten streak to five straight UK titles in the javelin throw. On the men's side, Steve Barry (racewalk), Graham Eggleton (pole vault), Peter Gordon (discus throw) and Martin Girvan (hammer throw) also defended their 1981 UK titles. Fatima Whitbread was the only woman to repeat her victory, doing so in the javelin. No athlete won multiple titles at this edition, though Mike McFarlane and Bev Callender both won the 200 metres title and were runners-up in the 100 metres.

The main international track and field competition for the United Kingdom that year was the 1982 European Athletics Championships. Reflecting the secondary status of the UK event at national level, none of the British individual medallists there were present at UK Championships, though four relay medallists were on the UK podium: Bev Callender, Shirley Thomas, Todd Bennett, Phil Brown. The four countries of the United Kingdom competed separately at the Commonwealth Games that year as well, and UK champions who won there were men's 200 m champion Mike McFarlane, men's racewalker Steve Barry and women's shot putter Judy Oakes.

== Medals ==
=== Men ===
Event	Gold		Silver		Bronze	
100m	Earl Tulloch	10.57	Mike McFarlane	10.59	Donovan Reid	10.71
200m	Mike McFarlane	21.07	Buster Watson	21.17	(Scotland) Gus McCuaig	21.44
400m	Phil Brown	46.20	Todd Bennett	46.54	Terry Whitehead	47.13
800m	(Scotland) Paul Forbes	1:46.53	Steve Caldwell	1:46.65	Peter Elliott	1:47.76
1,500m	Alan Mottershead	3:44.88	Colin Reitz	3:45.66	Alan Salter	3:46.19
5,000m	Tim Hutchings	13:40.66	Steve Harris	13:42.24	(Wales) Steve Jones	13:43.21
10,000m	Julian Goater	28:33.32	Mark Scrutton	29:01.58	Dave Long	29:03.95
110m hurdles	Wilbert Greaves	14.00	(Wales) Berwyn Price	14.15	(Scotland) Glenn MacDonald	14.35
400m hurdles	Gary Oakes	50.15	Mike Whittingham	51.39	(Scotland) Stan Devine	51.81
3000m steeplechase	(Wales) Roger Hackney	8:31.52	Eddie Wedderburn	8:33.02	David Lewis	8:37.66
10,000m walk	(Wales) Steve Barry	42:30.72	Roger Mills	43:42.57	Phil Vesty	43:45.02
high jump	(Wales) Trevor Llewelyn	2.16 m	David Abrahams	2.16 m	(Scotland) Geoff Parsons	2.13 m
pole vault	(Scotland) Graham Eggleton	5.10 m	Jeff Gutteridge	5.00 m	Brian Hooper	4.90 m
long jump	John Herbert	7.70 m	Len Tyson	7.47 m	Tony Henry	7.31 m
triple jump	Aston Moore	16.06 m	Eric McCalla	16.03 m	John Herbert	15.83 m
shot put	Andy Vince	17.83 m	Antony Zaidman	16.75 m	Mark Aldridge	16.68 m
discus throw	Peter Gordon	55.32 m	Neville Thompson	52.26 m	Graham Savory	51.54 m
hammer throw	Martin Girvan	74.18 m	Dave Smith	64.68 m	Mick Jones	58.76 m
javelin throw	David Ottley	85.36 m	Peter Yates	75.92 m	Dave Travis	73.20 m

=== Women ===
Event	Gold		Silver		Bronze	
100m	Heather Oakes	11.48	Bev Callender	11.53	Shirley Thomas	11.54
200m	Bev Callender	23.55	Shirley Thomas	23.84	Helen Barnett	24.03
400m	(Wales) Michelle Scutt	50.63	Joslyn Hoyte-Smith	50.76	(Scotland) Linsey MacDonald	51.85
800m	(Scotland) Anne Clarkson	2:03.6	Lorraine Baker	2:04.0	Cherry Hanson	2:04.2
1,500m	Carole Bradford	4:15.56	(Wales) Hilary Hollick	4:15.66	Gillian Dainty	4:16.95
3,000m	Paula Fudge	8:52.88	Ruth Smeeth	8:53.91	Jane Furniss	8:53.98
5,000m	Kathryn Binns	16:33.49	Suzan Hassan	16:45.96	Julie Asgill	16:50.78
100m hurdles	(Scotland) Elaine McMaster	13.71	Wendy McDonnell	13.83	(Scotland) Ann Girvan	13.89
400m hurdles	Susan Morley	57.10	Wendy Griffiths	58.08	Yvette Wray	58.21
high jump	Barbara Simmonds	1.87 m	Diana Elliott	1.87 m	Sarah Rowe	1.84 m
long jump	Beverly Kinch	6.50 m	(Wales) Gill Regan	6.33 m	Sue Hearnshaw	6.29 m
shot put	Judy Oakes	16.61 m	Vanessa Redford	15.22 m	Caroline Savory	15.12 m
discus throw	Lesley Bryant	48.34 m	Lynda Whiteley	48.20 m	Janette Picton	48.02 m
javelin throw	Fatima Whitbread	65.62 m	Jeanette Rose	58.60 m	Sharon Gibson	52.30 m
