= 1979 UK Athletics Championships =

British athletics event

- Dates: 11 & 12 August 1979
- Host city: Birmingham, England
- Venue: Alexander Stadium
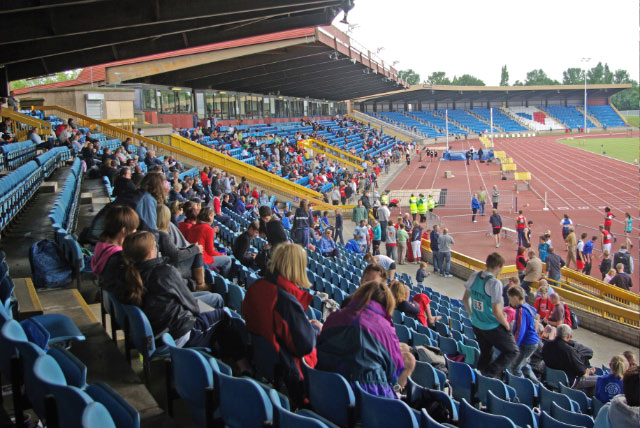
- Level: Senior
- Type: Outdoor

The 1979 UK Athletics Championships was the national championship in outdoor track and field for the United Kingdom held at Alexander Stadium, Birmingham, England.

It was the third edition of the competition limited to British athletes only, launched as an alternative to the AAA Championships, which was open to foreign competitors. However, because the calibre of national competition remained greater at the AAA event, the UK Championships this year were not considered the principal national championship event by some statisticians, such as the National Union of Track Statisticians (NUTS). Many of the athletes below also competed at the 1979 AAA Championships.

== Summary ==
Two athletes claimed a third straight title: Geoff Capes in the men's shot put and Meg Ritchie in the discus throw. Athletes to claim a second consecutive UK title were David Black (10,000 m), Chris Black (hammer throw), David Ottley (javelin throw), and Sue Reeve (long jump). Heather Hunte won her first titles in the 100 metres and 200 metres, beating out Kathy Smallwood and Beverley Goddard in both events.

The main international track and field competition for the United Kingdom that year was the 1979 European Cup. The secondary status of the UK event at national level was indicated by the fact that the six individual medallists at the European competition were all absent from the championships in Birmingham. Several of the European women's relay medallists did compete however, including Hunte, Smallwood and Joslyn Hoyte-Smith.

== Medals ==
=== Men ===
Event	Gold		Silver		Bronze	
100m	Trevor Hoyte	10.40	David Baptiste	10.47	(Scotland) Cameron Sharp	10.51
200m	Earl Tulloch	21.06	David Baptiste	21.21	(Scotland) Cameron Sharp	21.24
400m	Steve Scutt	47.01	Terry Whitehead	47.19	Rod Milne	47.22
800m	Dane Joseph	1:49.16	Rob Harrison	1:49.22	Pete Browne	1:49.66
1500m	Alan Mottershead	3:43.31	(Scotland) John Robson	3:43.52	Mike Downes	3:43.65
5000m	Steve Emson	13:36.53	Julian Goater	13:39.37	Bernie Ford	13:39.78
10,000m	Dave Black	28:46.03	(Scotland) Jim Brown	28:58.00	Peter Standing	28:58.88
110m hurdles	Mark Holtom	13.95	(Scotland) David Wilson	14.29	Wilbert Greaves	14.37
400m hurdles	Gary Oakes	50.76	Roger Bell	52.22	Phil Beattie	52.24
3000m steeplechase	(Scotland) Gordon Rimmer	8:39.15	John Wheway	8:43.33	Graeme Fell	8:46.75
High jump	(Scotland) Brian Burgess	2.13 m	Ossie Cham	2.10 m	Alan Dainton	2.05 m
Pole vault	Brian Hooper	5.40 m	Allan Williams	4.90 m	(Scotland) Graham Eggleton (Scotland) Allan Leiper	4.50 m
Long jump	Daley Thompson	7.69 m	Roy Mitchell	7.64 m w	Len Tyson	7.34 m
Triple jump	Aston Moore	15.72 m	David Johnson	15.70 m	Tony Wadhams	15.38 m
Shot put	Geoff Capes	19.00 m	Mike Winch	17.62 m	Ian Lindley	16.66 m
Discus throw	Richard Slaney	55.32 m	Dennis Roscoe	51.40 m	Geoff Tyler	51.38 m
Hammer throw	(Scotland) Chris Black	66.68 m	Paul Dickenson	65.06 m	Matthew Mileham	63.06 m
Javelin throw	David Ottley	74.72 m	Brian Roberts	72.88 m	John Trower	70.14 m

=== Women ===
Event	Gold		Silver		Bronze	
100m	Heather Hunte	11.30	Beverley Goddard	11.37	Kathy Smallwood	11.43
200m	Heather Hunte	23.15	Kathy Smallwood	23.18	Beverley Goddard	23.30
400m	Joslyn Hoyte-Smith	52.24	Michelle Probert	53.54	(Scotland) Karen Williams	53.74
800m	Christina Boxer	2:01.53	Liz Barnes	2:02.04	Janet Marlow	2:03.03
1500m	Gillian Dainty	4:15.65	Bernadette Madigan	4:16.13	Chris McMeekin	4:16.54
3000m	Glynis Penny	9:08.38	Mary Stewart	9:09.48	Kathryn Binns	9:11.18
100m hurdles	Shirley Strong	13.28	Yvette Wray	13.61	Judy Vernon	13.78
400m hurdles	Christine Warden	56.93	Diane Heath	58.17	Susan Dalgoutté	58.99
High jump	Ann-Marie Devally	1.86 m	Moira Maguire	1.78 m	Joy Crouchley	1.78 m
Long jump	Sue Reeve	6.30 m	Sue Hearnshaw	6.28 m	Carol Earlington	6.21 m
Shot put	Angela Littlewood	16.43 m	Judy Oakes	16.35 m	Venissa Head	16.34 m
Discus throw	(Scotland) Meg Ritchie	56.80 m	Janet Thompson	50.42 m	Lesley Mallin	47.72 m
Javelin	(Wales) Jacqueline Zaslona	53.32 m	Linda Stratford	48.28 m	Maxine Jervis	47.00 m
