= List of British champions in triple jump =

The British triple jump athletics champions covers three competitions; the current British Athletics Championships which was founded in 2007, the preceding AAA Championships (1914–2006) and the UK Athletics Championships which existed from 1977 until 1997 and ran concurrently with the AAA Championships.

Where an international athlete won the AAA Championships the highest ranking UK athlete is considered the National Champion in this list.

Between 1977 and 1994, and again in 1997, two events effectively crowned national champions each year. The official UK Athletics Championships (not to be confused with the current championships, a rebranded British Athletics Championships) were specifically only open to British nationals and were organised by the national governing body. The AAA Championships continued, and due to their history, continued to be considered by both statisticians and athletes to be the more prestigious championships, with the exception of 1997 where the UK Championships were considered the principle championships for the only time. Winners at the UK Championships were nonetheless considered as having won a national title.

The UK Athletics Championships ceased to exist upon the insolvency of the governing body, the British Athletics Federation. The AAA championships continued until 2006, before they were replaced by the new British Athletics Championships.

The most successful athletes in the event as of 2025 have been Fred Alsop and Naomi Metzger, each with seven championships.

== Past winners ==
AAA Championships men's event only
Year	Men's champion
1914	Philip Kingsford
1920	Charles Lively
1921	Howard Baker
1922	John Odde
1923	John Odde ^{(2)}
1924	Jack Higginson
1925	Harold Langley
1926	Jack Higginson ^{(2)}
1927	Jack Higginson ^{(3)}
1928	NBA
1929	Harold Langley ^{(2)}
1930	Arthur Gray
1931	Harold Langley ^{(3)}
1932	Arthur Gray ^{(2)}
1933	Edward Boyce
1934	Edward Boyce ^{(2)}
1935	Jack Higginson Jr.
1936	Edward Boyce ^{(3)}
1937	Bert Shillington
1938	Edward Boyce ^{(4)}
1939	F. Whalston
1946	Denis Watts
1947	Denis Watts ^{(2)}
1948	Allan Lindsay
1949	Sidney Cross
1950	Sidney Cross ^{(2)}
1951	Sidney Cross ^{(3)}
1952	Neville Coleman
1953	Ken Wilmshurst
1954	Ken Wilmshurst ^{(2)}
1955	Ken Wilmshurst ^{(3)}
1956	Ken Wilmshurst ^{(4)}
1957	Ken Wilmshurst ^{(5)}
1958	Ken Wilmshurst ^{(6)}
1959	John Whall
1960	Fred Alsop
1961	Fred Alsop ^{(2)}
1962	Mike Ralph
1963	Mike Ralph ^{(2)}
1964	Fred Alsop ^{(3)}
1965	Fred Alsop ^{(4)}
1966	Fred Alsop ^{(5)}
1967	Fred Alsop ^{(6)}
1968	Fred Alsop ^{(7)}
1969	Tony Wadhams
1970	Tony Wadhams ^{(2)}
1971	Tony Wadhams ^{(3)}
1972	David Johnson
1973	Tony Wadhams ^{(4)}
1974	Willie Clark
1975	David Johnson ^{(2)}
1976	Aston Moore

AAA Championships & UK Athletics Championships dual championships era 1977-1987
Year	AAA Men	Year	UK Men
1977	David Johnson ^{(3)}	1977	Aston Moore
1978	Aston Moore ^{(2)}	1978	Keith Connor
1979	Keith Connor	1979	Aston Moore ^{(2)}
1980	Aston Moore ^{(3)}	1980	Keith Connor ^{(2)}
1981	Aston Moore ^{(4)}	1981	Gary Gallagher
1982	John Herbert	1982	Aston Moore ^{(3)}
1983	Eric McCalla	1983	Aston Moore ^{(4)}
1984	John Herbert ^{(2)}	1984	Aston Moore ^{(5)}
1985	John Herbert ^{(3)}	1985	Eric McCalla
1986	Mike Makin	1986	John Herbert
1987	Eric McCalla ^{(2)}	1987	Eric McCalla ^{(2)}
1988	John Herbert ^{(4)}	1988	Rez Cameron

AAA Championships & UK Athletics Championships dual championships era 1989-1997
Year	Men AAA	Women AAA	Year	Men UK	Women UK
1989	Jonathan Edwards	Evette Finikin	1989	Jonathan Edwards	nc
1990	John Herbert ^{(5)}	Evette Finikin ^{(2)}	1990	Francis Agyepong	Michelle Griffith
1991	Jonathan Edwards ^{(2)}	Evette Finikin ^{(3)}	1991	Vernon Samuels	Evette Finikin
1992	Julian Golley	Rachel Kirby	1992	Jonathan Edwards ^{(2)}	Rachel Kirby
1993	Francis Agyepong	Rachel Kirby ^{(2)}	1993	Tosi Fasinro	Michelle Griffith ^{(2)}
1994	Jonathan Edwards ^{(3)}	Michelle Griffith	n/a		
1995	Francis Agyepong ^{(2)}	Michelle Griffith ^{(2)}	n/a		
1996	Francis Agyepong ^{(3)}	Ashia Hansen	n/a		
1997	Francis Agyepong ^{(4)}	Katie Evans	1997	Francis Agyepong ^{(2)}	Ashia Hansen

AAA Championships second era 1998-2006
Year	Men's champion	Women's champion
1998	Jonathan Edwards ^{(4)}	Connie Henry
1999	Larry Achike	Michelle Griffith ^{(3)}
2000	Phillips Idowu	Michelle Griffith ^{(4)}
2001	Jonathan Edwards ^{(5)}	Ashia Hansen ^{(3)}
2002	Phillips Idowu ^{(2)}	Ashia Hansen ^{(4)}
2003	Larry Achike ^{(2)}	Rebecca White
2004	Nathan Douglas	Michelle Griffith ^{(5)}
2005	Nathan Douglas ^{(2)}	Nadia Williams
2006	Phillips Idowu ^{(3)}	Ashia Hansen ^{(5)}

British Athletics Championships 2007 to present
Year	Men's champion	Women's champion
2007	Tosin Oke	Nadia Williams ^{(2)}
2008	Phillips Idowu ^{(4)}	Nadia Williams ^{(3)}
2009	Phillips Idowu ^{(5)}	Nadia Williams ^{(4)}
2010	Phillips Idowu ^{(6)}	Laura Samuel
2011	Larry Achike ^{(3)}	Laura Samuel ^{(2)}
2012	Larry Achike ^{(4)}	Laura Samuel ^{(3)}
2013	Julian Reid	Laura Samuel ^{(4)}
2014	Julian Reid ^{(2)}	Yamilé Aldama
2015	Julian Reid ^{(3)}	Sineade Gutzmore
2016	Nathan Douglas ^{(3)}	Laura Samuel ^{(5)}
2017	Ben Williams	Naomi Ogbeta
2018	Nathan Douglas ^{(4)}	Naomi Ogbeta ^{(2)}
2019	Ben Williams ^{(2)}	Naomi Ogbeta ^{(3)}
2020	Nathan Douglas ^{(5)}	Naomi Ogbeta ^{(4)}
2021	Ben Williams ^{(3)}	Naomi Ogbeta ^{(5)}
2022	Ben Williams ^{(4)}	Naomi Metzger ^{(6)}
2023	Efe Uwaifo	Georgina Forde-Wells
2024	Efe Uwaifo ^{(2)}	Naomi Metzger ^{(7)}
2025	Archie Yeo	Adelaide Omitowoju
2026	Daniel Falode	Georgina Forde-Wells

- NBA = No British athlete in medal placings
- nc = not contested
