= 1969 AAA Championships =

Outdoor track and field competition

- Dates: 1–2 August 1969
- Host city: London, England
- Venue: White City Stadium
- Level: Senior
- Type: Outdoor

The 1969 AAA Championships was the 1969 edition of the annual outdoor track and field competition organised by the Amateur Athletic Association (AAA). It was held from 1 to 2 August 1969 at White City Stadium in London, England.

== Summary ==
The Championships covered two days of competition. The marathon was held in Manchester and the decathlon event was held in Blackburn.

Event distances adopted the Metric system for the first time. Previously the UK measurements used Imperial units.

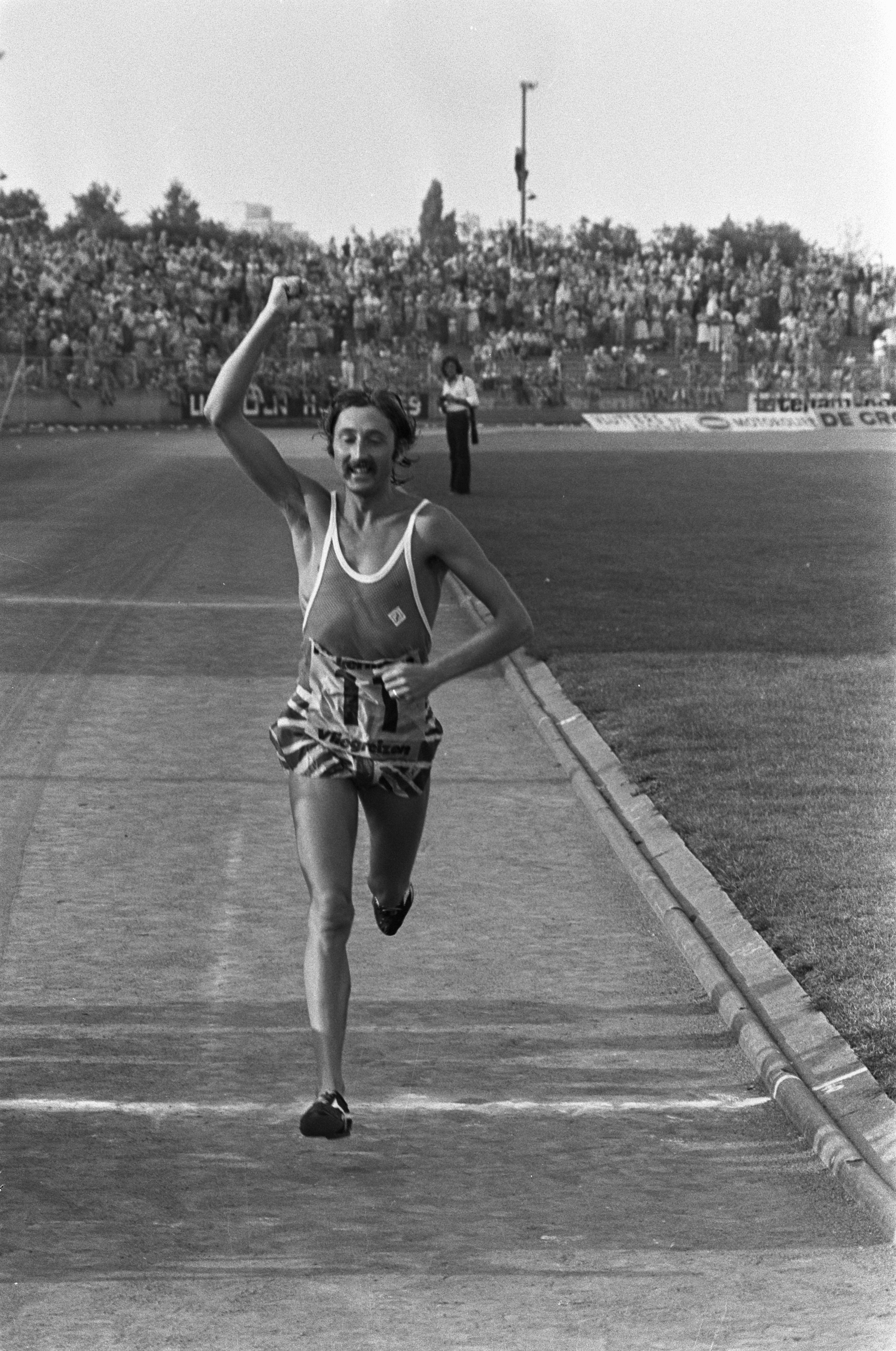
Ron Hill won both the 10 miles and marathon titles during 1969

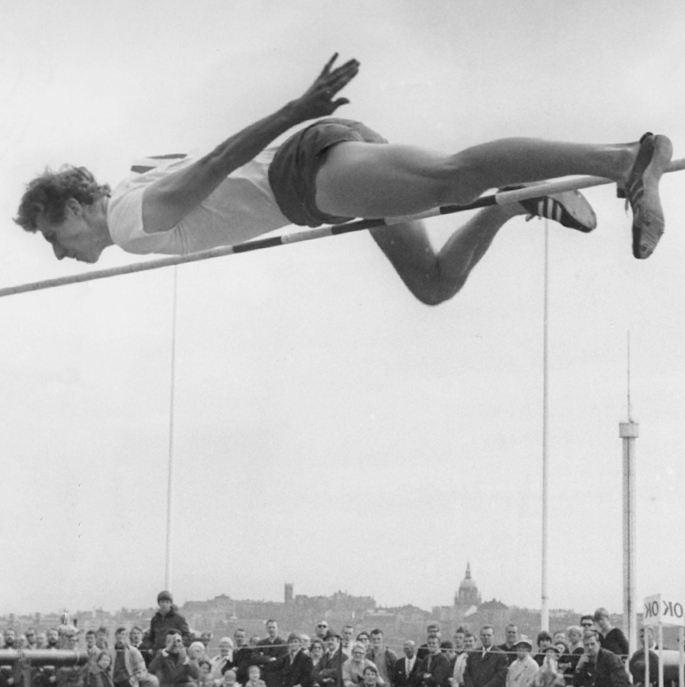
Kenneth Lundmark

== Results ==
Event	Gold		Silver		Bronze	
100m	(Wales) Ron Jones	10.7	(Scotland) Don Halliday	10.7	Ian Green	10.7
200m	David Dear	21.38	Malcolm Yardley	21.51	Eric Pape	21.52
400m	Gwynne Griffiths	46.77	John Robertson	46.82	Martin Winbolt Lewis	47.20
800m	Dave Cropper	1:48.96	(Republic of Ireland) Noel Carroll	1:49.53	Peter Browne	1:49.70
1,500m	(Republic of Ireland) Frank Murphy	3:40.90	John Whetton	3:41.84	Walter Wilkinson	3:43.16
5,000m	Ian Stewart	13:39.66	Alan Blinston	13:42.58	Ricky Wilde	13:45.34
10,000m	Dick Taylor	28:27.50	Mike Tagg	28:36.4	Ron Hill	28:38.98
10 miles	Ron Hill	47:27.0	Ron Grove	47:28.2	John Caine	48:50.0
marathon	Ron Hill	2:13:42	(Australia) Derek Clayton	2:15:40	(Scotland) Jim Alder	2:18:18
3000m steeplechase	John Jackson	8:35.0	Gerry Stevens	8:36.2	Andy Holden	8:40.0
110m hurdles	(South Africa) Willem Coetzee	14.0	Alan Pascoe	14.0	Stuart Storey	14.5
400m hurdles	John Sherwood	50.12	Andy Todd	51.30	John Cooper	51.66
3,000m walk	Roger Mills	12:57.0	Peter Marlow	12:58.2	Phil Embleton	13:11.6
10,000m walk	Paul Nihill	44:07.0	Phil Embleton	46:31.0	(Scotland) Bill Sutherland	46:41.0
high jump	(Sweden) Kenneth Lundmark	2.10	(Scotland) Crawford Fairbrother	1.96	Michael Campbell	1.96
pole vault	Mike Bull	4.73	Martin Higdon	4.30	Stuart Tufton	4.30
long jump	(Wales) Lynn Davies	7.62	Alan Lerwill	7.53	Phil Scott	7.34
triple jump	Tony Wadhams	15.66	Fred Alsop	15.59	Derek Boosey	15.32
shot put	Jeff Teale	18.32	Bill Tancred	16.90	(Scotland) Mike Lindsay	16.51
discus throw	Bill Tancred	53.08	Pete Tancred	52.14	Arthur McKenzie	52.04
hammer throw	Howard Payne	66.80	Bruce Fraser	61.92	(Scotland) Laurie Bryce	61.72
javelin throw	(Poland) Władysław Nikiciuk	85.08	Dave Travis	80.0	Dick Perkins	72.98
decathlon	(South Africa) Peter de Villiers	6960	(Scotland) Stewart McCallum	6569	Stuart Scott	6542

== See also ==
- 1969 WAAA Championships
