= List of British champions in 400 metres hurdles =

The British 400 metres hurdles athletics champions covers three competitions; the current British Athletics Championships which was founded in 2007, the preceding AAA Championships (1914-2006) and the UK Athletics Championships which existed from 1977 until 1997 and ran concurrently with the AAA Championships.

Where an international athlete won the AAA Championships the highest ranking UK athlete is considered the National Champion in this list.

== Past winners ==
AAA Championships 440 yards hurdles, men's event only
Year	Men's champion
1914	Joseph English
1919	George Gray
1920	Edward Wheller
1921	NBA
1922	J. J. Evans
1923	L. H. Phillips
1924	Wilfrid Tatham
1925	William Boardman
1926	Lord Burghley
1927	Lord Burghley
1928	Lord Burghley
1929	Lord Burghley
1930	Lord Burghley
1931	Lord Burghley
1932	Lord Burghley
1933	Lord Burghley
1934	Ralph Kilner Brown
1935	Alan Hunter
1936	John Sheffield
1937	J. G. Barnes
1938	Rowland Palmer
1939	Rowland Palmer
1946	Ronald Ede
1947	Harry Whittle
1948	Harry Whittle
1949	Harry Whittle
1950	Harry Whittle
1951	Harry Whittle
1952	Harry Whittle
1953	Harry Whittle
1954	Harry Kane
1955	Bob Shaw
1956	Tom Farrell
1957	Tom Farrell
1958	Tom Farrell
1959	Chris Goudge
1960	Max Boyes
1961	Chris Surety
1962	Chris Surety
1963	John Cooper
1964	John Cooper
1965	John Cooper
1966	John Sherwood
1967	John Sherwood
1968	David Hemery
400 metres hurdles, men's event only
1969	John Sherwood
1970	Bob Roberts
1971	John Sherwood
1972	David Hemery

AAA Championships / WAAA Championships 400 metres hurdles
Year	Men's champion	Year	Women's champion
1973	Alan Pascoe	1973	Sue Howell
1974	Bill Hartley	1974	Linda Robinson
1975	Bill Hartley	1975	Jannette Roscoe
1976	Alan Pascoe	1976	Christine Warden

AAA Championships/WAAA Championships & UK Athletics Championships dual championships era 1977-1987
Year	AAA Men	Year	WAAA Women	Year	UK Men	UK Women
1977	Alan Pascoe	1977	Liz Sutherland	1977	Peter Kelly	Christine Warden
1978	Alan Pascoe	1978	Liz Sutherland	1978	Bill Hartley	Liz Sutherland
1979	Gary Oakes	1979	Christine Warden	1979	Gary Oakes	Christine Warden
1980	Bill Hartley	1980	Susan Morley	1980	Gary Oakes	Susan Dalgoutté
1981	Gary Oakes	1981	Christine Warden	1981	Bill Hartley	Wendy Griffiths
1982	Mike Whittingham	1982	Susan Morley	1982	Gary Oakes	Susan Morley
1983	Steve Sole	1983	Yvette Wray	1983	Phil Beattie	Susan Morley
1984	Martin Gillingham	1984	Gladys Taylor	1984	Martin Briggs	Gladys Taylor
1985	Max Robertson	1985	Yvette Wray	1985	Phil Beattie	Aileen Mills
1986	Max Robertson	1986	Yvette Wray	1986	Max Robertson	Yvette Wray
1987	Max Robertson	1987	Elaine McLaughlin	1987	Kriss Akabusi	Elaine McLaughlin

AAA Championships & UK Athletics Championships dual championships era 1988-1997
Year	Men AAA	Women AAA	Year	Men UK	Women UK
1988	Max Robertson	Sally Gunnell	1988	Philip Harries	Elaine McLaughlin
1989	Max Robertson	Wendy Cearns	1989	Max Robertson	Elaine McLaughlin
1990	Max Robertson	Gowry Retchakan	1990	Kriss Akabusi	Clare Sugden
1991	Max Robertson	Gowry Retchakan	1991	Max Robertson	Jacqui Parker
1992	Kriss Akabusi	Gowry Retchakan	1992	Kriss Akabusi	Gowry Retchakan
1993	Gary Cadogan	Jacqui Parker	1993	Gary Cadogan	Gowry Retchakan
1994	Peter Crampton	Gowry Retchakan	n/a		
1995	Gary Cadogan	Gowry Retchakan	n/a		
1996	Jon Ridgeon	Sally Gunnell	n/a		
1997	Charles Robertson-Adams	Keri Maddox	1997	Chris Rawlinson	Sally Gunnell

AAA Championships second era 1998-2006
Year	Men's champion	Women's champion
1998	Paul Gray	Natasha Danvers
1999	Chris Rawlinson	Sinead Dudgeon
2000	Chris Rawlinson	Keri Maddox
2001	Chris Rawlinson	Sinead Dudgeon
2002	Chris Rawlinson	Natasha Danvers
2003	Chris Rawlinson	Liz Fairs
2004	Chris Rawlinson	Katie Jones
2005	Matthew Elias	Nicola Sanders
2006	Rhys Williams	Natasha Danvers-Smith

British Athletics Championships 2007 to present
Year	Men's champion	Women's champion
2007	Dale Garland	Natasha Danvers-Smith
2008	Richard Yates	Perri Shakes-Drayton
2009	Dai Greene	Nusrat Ceesay
2010	Dai Greene	Perri Shakes-Drayton
2011	Nathan Woodward	Perri Shakes-Drayton
2012	Dai Greene	Perri Shakes-Drayton
2013	Dai Greene	Perri Shakes-Drayton
2014	Niall Flannery	Eilidh Child
2015	Niall Flannery	Eilidh Child
2016	Sebastian Rodger	Eilidh Doyle
2017	Jack Green	Eilidh Doyle
2018	Dai Greene	Meghan Beesley
2019	Jacob Paul	Meghan Beesley
2020	Alastair Chalmers	Jessie Knight
2021	Alastair Chalmers	Jessica Turner
2022	Alastair Chalmers	Jessie Knight
2023	Alastair Chalmers	Jessie Knight
2024	Alastair Chalmers	Lina Nielsen
2025	Tyri Donovan	Lina Nielsen
2026	Alastair Chalmers	Emily Newnham

- NBA = No British athlete in medal placings
- nc = not contested
