= 1985 UK Athletics Championships =

British athletics event

- Dates: 25 & 26 May 1985
- Host city: Antrim, Northern Ireland
- Venue: Antrim Stadium
- Level: Senior
- Type: Outdoor

The 1985 UK Athletics Championships sponsored by HFC Bank, was the national championship in outdoor track and field for the United Kingdom held at Antrim Stadium, Antrim. It was the second time that a national track and field championship was held in Northern Ireland, after hosting the 1981 event.

It was the ninth edition of the competition limited to British athletes only, launched as an alternative to the AAA Championships, which was open to foreign competitors. However, because the calibre of national competition remained greater at the AAA event, the UK Championships this year were not considered the principal national championship event by some statisticians, such as the National Union of Track Statisticians (NUTS). Many of the athletes below also competed at the 1985 AAA Championships.

== Summary ==
Fatima Whitbread won her fifth consecutive women's javelin throw UK title. Both the men's and women's champions defended in the 5000 metres (Eamonn Martin, Angela Tooby) and shot put (Billy Cole, Judy Oakes), as did men's hammer thrower Dave Smith. Linford Christie and John Regis recorded the same times in both the 100 metres and 200 metres finals. Christie was given the 100 m title while the two shared the 200 m title. Christie was the only athlete at the competition to win two titles.

The main international track and field competition for the United Kingdom that year was the 1985 European Cup. Three UK champions medalled at that event: Whitbread in the javelin, Angela Tooby in the 10,000 m and Tom McKean in the 800 metres. Derek Redmond was third in the 400 metres at the European competition, despite coming second at the UK race.

== Medals ==
=== Men ===
Event	Gold		Silver		Bronze	
100m	Linford Christie	10.5	John Regis	10.5	(Scotland) Gus McCuaig	10.6
200m	Linford Christie John Regis	21.59	Not awarded		(Scotland) Gus McCuaig	21.73
400m	Phil Brown	45.26	Derek Redmond	45.66	Steve Heard	45.74
800m	(Scotland) Tom McKean	1:49.12	David Sharpe	1:49.32	Richard Lynch	1:49.84
1,500m	Mark Rowland	3:43.40	Alan Mottershead	3:44.10	Gary Staines	3:44.22
5,000m	Eamonn Martin	13:44.07	Ashworth Laukam	13:48.01	Dick Callan	13:48.39
10,000m	Mark Scrutton	28:42.01	Karl Harrison	28:42.88	Steve Anders	28:55.63
110m hurdles	Wilbert Greaves	14.10	Kieran Moore	14.39	Steve Buckeridge	14.62
400m hurdles	Phil Beattie	51.40	Trevor Burton	51.46	Steve Sole	51.72
3000m steeplechase	Kevin Capper	8:42.6	Colin Walker	8:43.5	Steve Marzillus	8:50.9
10,000m walk	Ian McCombie	41:25.90	Martin Rush	43:43.42	David Hucks	44:19.69
high jump	(Scotland) Geoff Parsons	2.08 m	Ricky Robinson	2.05 m	Rupert Charles Floyd Manderson	2.00 m
pole vault	Andy Ashurst	5.00 m	Phil Lovell	4.80 m	Richard Gammage	4.60 m
long jump	Denis Costello	7.37 m	Ian Ward	7.32 m	John King	7.28 m
triple jump	Eric McCalla	16.42 m	Femi Abejide	15.62 m	Francis Agyepong	15.28 m
shot put	Billy Cole	18.03 m	Andy Vince	16.94 m	Graham Savory	16.64 m
discus throw	Paul Mardle	57.94 m	Graham Savory	54.12 m	Gary Herrington	51.56 m
hammer throw	Dave Smith	77.04 m	Mark Sterling	59.14 m	Shane Peacock	55.00 m
javelin throw	Mick Hill	76.62 m	Steve Pearson	76.22 m	Marcus Humphries	72.24 m

=== Women ===
Event	Gold		Silver		Bronze	
100m	Jayne Andrews	11.63	Sybil Joseph	11.67	Kaye Jeffrey	11.75
200m	Kathy Cook	23.69	Joan Baptiste	23.89	Sybil Joseph	24.10
400m	Linda Keough	52.81	Angela Piggford	53.42	(Wales) Sian Morris	54.26
800m	(Scotland) Liz MacArthur	2:05.50	(Scotland) Karin Steer	2:06.30	(Scotland) Carol Sharp	2:06.76
1,500m	Bridget Smyth	4:11.12	Gillian Settle	4:12.19	(Scotland) Yvonne Murray	4:12.35
3,000m	(Scotland) Yvonne Murray	9:00.97	(Wales) Susan Tooby	9:06.76	(Scotland) Liz Lynch	9:08.34
5,000m	(Wales) Angela Tooby	15:28.00	(Wales) Susan Tooby	15:32.19	Jill Clarke	15:34.16
100m hurdles	Judy Simpson	13.47	Judith Rodgers	13.71	Lesley-Ann Skeete	13.76
400m hurdles	Aileen Mills	58.66	Simone Gandy	58.68	Lucy Elliott	60.39
5000m walk	Ginney Birch	23:20.00	Susan Ashforth	23:55.27	Helen Elleker	24:07.97
high jump	(Northern Ireland) Janet Boyle	1.86 m	(Northern Ireland) Sharon McPeake	1.80 m	Judy Simpson	1.80 m
long jump	Margaret Cheetham	6.30 m	Judy Simpson	6.29 m	(Scotland) Lorraine Campbell	6.21 m
shot put	Judy Oakes	17.50 m	Myrtle Augee	17.08 m	Sandra Smith	14.54 m
discus throw	Julia Avis	48.46 m	Karen Pugh	47.16 m	Catherine Bradley	45.70 m
javelin throw	Fatima Whitbread	64.02 m	Sharon Gibson	59.62 m	Anna Lockton	54.76 m
