= 1987 UK Athletics Championships =

British athletics event

- Dates: 25 & 26 May 1987
- Host city: Derby, England
- Venue: Moorways Stadium
- Level: Senior
- Type: Outdoor

The 1987 UK Athletics Championships sponsored by HFC Bank, was the national championship in outdoor track and field for the United Kingdom held at Moorways Stadium, Derby. It was the first time that the English city hosted the event. The men's 10,000 metres was held at the Gateshead International Stadium, while the women's event was dropped entirely.

It was the eleventh edition of the competition limited to British athletes only, launched as an alternative to the AAA Championships, which was open to foreign competitors. However, because the calibre of national competition remained greater at the AAA event, the UK Championships this year were not considered the principal national championship event by some statisticians, such as the National Union of Track Statisticians (NUTS). Many of the athletes below also competed at the 1987 AAA Championships.

== Summary ==
Fatima Whitbread won her seventh consecutive women's javelin throw UK title, while shot putter Judy Oakes won a fourth straight title and men's javelin athlete Mick Hill his third. Other athletes to defend their 1986 titles were Max Robertson (400 m hurdles), Paula Dunn (100 m), Lisa Langford (racewalk) and Diana Davies (high jump). Dunn, with her sprint double, was the only athlete to win two UK titles that year, though Kim Hagger managed to be runner-up in both 100 m hurdles and long jump events.

The main international track and field competition for the United Kingdom that year was the 1987 World Championships in Athletics. Women's UK champion Fatima Whitbread won the world title, as she had in 1983. Men's 100 m champion Linford Christie was the only other UK champion to reach the podium, though several British athletes not present at the UK event did so.

== Medals ==
=== Men ===
Event	Gold		Silver		Bronze	
100m	Linford Christie	10.35	(Scotland) Jamie Henderson	10.50	Marcus Adam	10.61
200m	Roger Black	20.80	Clarence Callender	20.99	(Scotland) Jamie Henderson	21.17
400m	Steve Heard	46.96	Paul Harmsworth	47.12	Peter Crampton	47.32
800m	John Gladwin	1:47.66	Paul Herbert	1:47.74	Martin Steele	1:47.75
1,500m	(Wales) Neil Horsfield	3:43.69	Andrew Geddes	3:43.93	Richard McDonnell	3:44.12
5,000m	Simon Mugglestone	13:43.82	Richard Nerurkar	13:45.52	Karl Harrison	13:50.98
10,000m	Nick Rose	28:22.05	Steve Binns	28:22.98	Carl Thackery	28:25.17
110m hurdles	Tony Jarrett	13.72	David Nelson	13.77	Hughie Teape	13.96
400m hurdles	Kriss Akabusi Max Robertson	49.56	Not awarded		Martin Gillingham	50.49
3000m steeplechase	Colin Walker	8:33.28	Mick Hawkins	8:45.84	Steve Jones	8:48.87
10,000m walk	Ian McCombie	40:45.87	Chris Maddocks	41:11.66	Phil Vesty	41:18.94
high jump	Floyd Manderson	2.18 m	Andy Hutchinson	2.15 m	Mike Powell	2.10 m
pole vault	Jeff Gutteridge	5.10 m	Paul Hoad	5.00 m	Mike Edwards	4.80 m
long jump	Stewart Faulkner	7.68 m	Keith Fleming	7.62 m	Trevor Sinclair	7.34 m
triple jump	Eric McCalla	16.46 m	Francis Agyepong	15.96 m	(Scotland) Craig Duncan	15.82 m
shot put	Carl Jennings	17.37 m	Paul Edwards	17.28 m	Mark Aldridge	17.03 m
discus throw	Paul Mardle	56.96 m	Gary Herrington	55.12 m	Peter Gordon	54.52 m
hammer throw	Dave Smith	74.50 m	Paul Head	67.94 m	Mick Jones	66.94 m
javelin throw	Mick Hill	81.02 m	Gary Jenson	75.62 m	Mark Roberson	74.22 m

=== Women ===
Event	Gold		Silver		Bronze	
100m	Paula Dunn	11.31	Simmone Jacobs	11.34	Eleanor Cohen	11.51
200m	Paula Dunn	23.41	(Scotland) Sandra Whittaker	23.59	Jennifer Stoute	23.68
400m	Carol Finlay	53.47	Linda Keough	53.67	Linda Forsyth	53.96
800m	Diane Edwards	2:01.68	Shireen Bailey	2:02.38	Janet Bell	2:02.41
1,500m	Christine Benning	4:07.37	(Scotland) Liz Lynch	4:08.03	Alison Wyeth	4:14.63
3,000m	(Scotland) Yvonne Murray	8:53.89	Ruth Partridge	9:04.85	(Wales) Angela Tooby	9:06.42
100m hurdles	Lesley-Ann Skeete	13.29	Kim Hagger	13.48	Wendy Jeal	13.53
400m hurdles	(Northern Ireland) Elaine McLaughlin	57.91	Jennie Pearson	58.75	Simone Gandy	58.90
5000m walk	Lisa Langford	22:19.04	Bev Allen	23:15.04	Helen Elleker	23:34.64
high jump	Diana Davies	1.85 m	(Northern Ireland) Janet Boyle Joanne Jennings Debbie McDowell	1.80 m	Not awarded	
long jump	Mary Berkeley	6.44 m	Kim Hagger	6.40 m	Fiona May	6.38 m
shot put	Judy Oakes	18.43 m	Myrtle Augee	17.80 m	Yvonne Hanson-Nortey	16.10 m
discus throw	Kathryn Farr	55.42 m	Ellen Mulvihill	52.78 m	Judy Oakes	50.90 m
javelin throw	Fatima Whitbread	75.62 m	Julie Abel	59.82 m	Sharon Gibson	58.52 m
