= List of British champions in 3000 metres steeplechase =

The British 3,000 metres steeplechase athletics champions covers four competitions; the current British Athletics Championships which was founded in 2007, the preceding AAA Championships (1880–2006), the Amateur Athletic Club Championships (1866–1879) and finally the UK Athletics Championships which existed from 1977 until 1997 and ran concurrently with the AAA Championships.

Where an international athlete won the AAA Championships the highest ranking UK athlete is considered the National Champion in this list.

== Past winners ==
Year	Champion
AAC Championships Men only, no set distance or number of obstacles
1879	Henry Oliver
AAA Championships Men only, no set distance or number of obstacles
1880	James Concannon
1881	James Ogden
1882	Thomas Crellin
1883	Thomas Thornton
1884	William Snook
1885	William Snook
1886	M. A. Harrison
1887	M. A. Harrison
1888	J. C. Cope
1889	Tom White
1890	Edward Parry
1891	Edward Parry
1892	W. H. Smith
1893	George Martin
1894	Alfred George
1895	Edwin Wilkins
1896	Sidney Robinson
1897	George Lee
1898	Charles Lee
1899	Walter Stokes
1900	Sidney Robinson
1901	Sidney Robinson
1902	George Martin
1903	Sidney Robinson
1904	Arthur Russell
1905	Arthur Russell
1906	Arthur Russell
1907	Joseph English
1908	Reginald Noakes
1909	Reginald Noakes
1910	Joseph English
1911	Reginald Noakes
1912	Sydney Frost
2 miles (Men's event only)
1913	Charles Ruffell
1914	Sydney Frost
1919	Percy Hodge
1920	Percy Hodge
1921	Percy Hodge
1922	Bert Rippington
1923	Percy Hodge
1924	Joe Blewitt
1925	Jack Webster
1926	Jack Webster
1927	Jack Webster
1928	Jack Webster
1929	Edward Oliver
1930	George Bailey
1931	Tom Evenson
1932	Tom Evenson
1933	George Bailey
1934	Stanley Scarsbrook
1935	George Bailey
1936	Tom Evenson
1937	William Wylie
1938	John Potts
1939	Anthony Etheridge
1946	Albert Robertson
1947	Albert Robertson
1948	Peter Curry
1949	Trevor Holt
1950	John Disley
1951	John Disley
1952	John Disley
1953	Eddie Ellis
3,000 metres (Men's event only)
1954	Ken Johnson
1955	John Disley
1956	Eric Shirley
1957	John Disley
1958	Eric Shirley
1959	Maurice Herriott
1960	Eric Shirley
1961	Maurice Herriott
1962	Maurice Herriott
1963	Maurice Herriott
1964	Maurice Herriott
1965	Maurice Herriott
1966	Maurice Herriott
1967	Maurice Herriott
1968	Gareth Bryan-Jones
1969	John Jackson
1970	Andy Holden
1971	Andy Holden
1972	Steve Hollings
1973	Steve Hollings
1974	John Davies
1975	Tony Staynings
1976	Tony Staynings

AAA Championships & UK Athletics Championships Dual championships era 1977–1997
Year	AAA Men	Year	UK Men
1977	Dennis Coates	1977	Tony Staynings
1978	Dennis Coates	1978	Dennis Coates
1979	Julian Marsay	1979	Gordon Rimmer
1980	Roger Hackney	1980	Tony Staynings
1981	Graeme Fell	1981	Kevin Capper
1982	Roger Hackney	1982	Roger Hackney
1983	Colin Reitz	1983	David Lewis
1984	Paul Davies-Hale	1984	Paul Davies-Hale
1985	Kevin Capper	1985	Kevin Capper
1986	Eddie Wedderburn	1986	Kevin Capper
1987	Eddie Wedderburn	1987	Colin Walker
1988	Mark Rowland	1988	Neil Smart
1989	Colin Walker	1989	Neil Smart
1990	Tom Hanlon	1990	Ken Penney
1991	Colin Walker	1991	Peter McColgan
1992	Colin Walker	1992	Colin Walker
1993	Colin Walker	1993	Spencer Duval
1994	Justin Chaston	n/a	
1995	Spencer Duval	n/a	
1996	Justin Chaston	n/a	
1997	Spencer Duval	1997	Rob Hough

AAA Championships second era 1998-2006
Year	Men's champion	Women's champion
1998	Christian Stephenson	nc
1999	Christian Stephenson	nc
2000	Christian Stephenson	nc
2001	Ben Whitby	nc
2002	Ben Whitby	Tara Krzywicki+
2003	Stuart Stokes	Tara Krzywicki+
2004	Justin Chaston	Tina Brown
2005	Andrew Lemoncello	Tina Brown
2006	Jermaine Mays	Hattie Dean

British Athletics Championships 2007 to present
Year	Men's champion	Women's champion
2008	Adam Bowden	Helen Clitheroe
2009	Luke Gunn	Helen Clitheroe
2010	Luke Gunn	Barbara Parker
2011	Luke Gunn	Lennie Waite
2012	Luke Gunn	Eilish McColgan
2013	James Wilkinson	Eilish McColgan
2014	James Wilkinson	Eilish McColgan
2015	Rob Mullett	Lennie Waite
2016	Rob Mullett	Rosie Clarke
2017	Rob Mullett	Iona Lake
2018	Zak Seddon	Rosie Clarke
2019	Zak Seddon	Rosie Clarke
2020	Phil Norman	Aimee Pratt
2021	Mark Pearce	Elizabeth Bird
2022	Jamaine Coleman	Elizabeth Bird
2023	Will Battershill	Poppy Tank
2024	Phil Norman	Elizabeth Bird
2025	Phil Norman	Elise Thorner
2026	Kristian Imroth	Elise Thorner

+2,000 metres
