= 1963 AAA Championships =

Outdoor track and field competition

- Dates: 12–13 July 1963
- Host city: London, England
- Venue: White City Stadium
- Level: Senior
- Type: Outdoor

The 1963 AAA Championships was the 1963 edition of the annual outdoor track and field competition organised by the Amateur Athletic Association (AAA). It was held from 12 to 13 July 1963 at White City Stadium in London, England.

== Summary ==
The Championships covered two days of competition. The marathon was held in Coventry and the decathlon event was held in Loughborough. The 220 yards hurdles was discontinued.

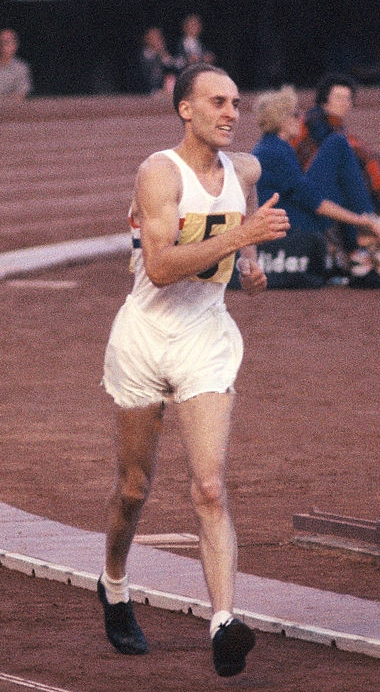
Ken Matthews won both walking events

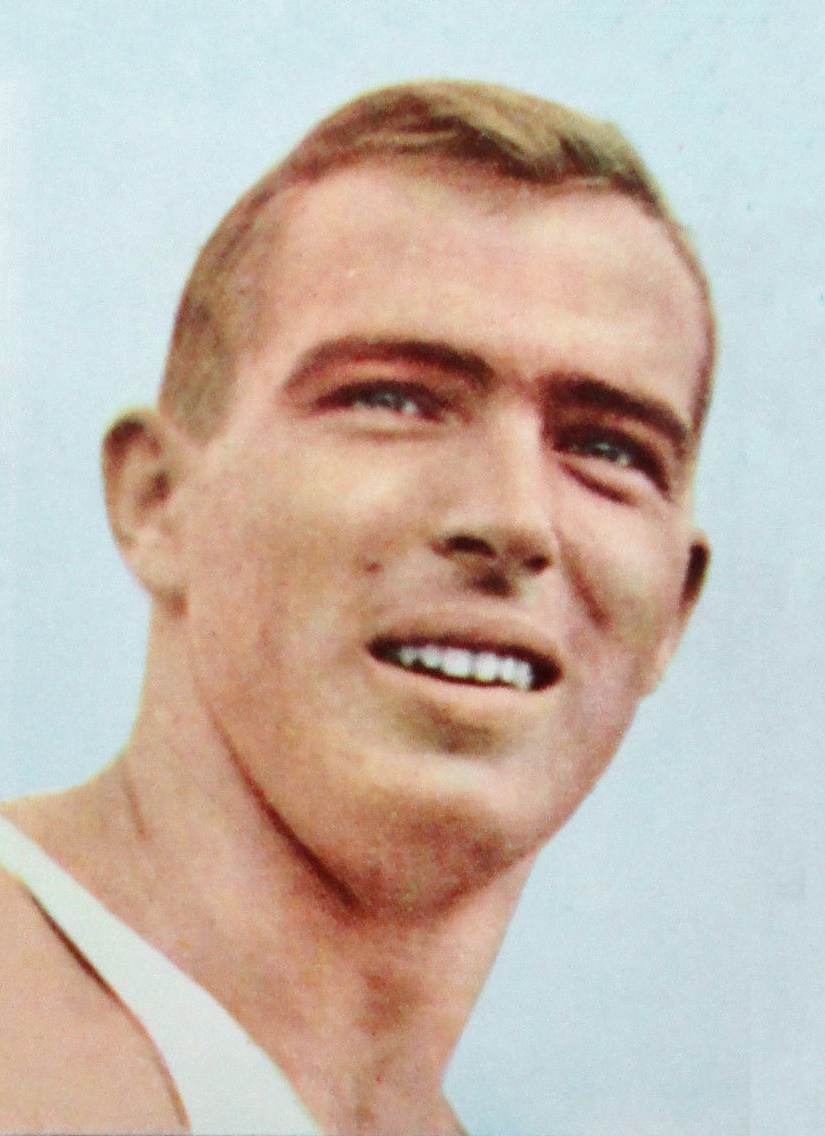
John Pennel broke the pole vault world record

== Results ==
Event	Gold		Silver		Bronze	
100 yards	(Wales) Berwyn Jones	9.71	(United States) Larry Questad	9.74	(Wales) Ron Jones	9.76
220 yards	David Jones	21.26	(United States) Larry Questad	21.29	Peter Radford	21.56
440 yards	Adrian Metcalfe	47.22	(United States) Ron Freeman	47.26	Barry Jackson	47.46
880 yards	(Republic of Ireland) Noel Carroll	1:50.26	(Republic of Ireland) Derek McCleane	1:50.86	(United States) Greg Pelster	1:50.99
1 mile	Alan Simpson	4:04.83	Peter Keeling	4:05.11	(Northern Ireland) Colin Shillington	4:05.31
3 miles	Bruce Tulloh	13:23.89	(Republic of Ireland) Tom O'Riordan	13:26.81	Don Taylor	13:27.57
6 miles	Ron Hill	27:49.90 NR	(Republic of Ireland) Jim Hogan	27:54.12	Ron Gomez	27:59.50
10 miles	Mel Batty	48:13.4	(United States) Buddy Edelen	48:28.0	Don Taylor	49:00.0
marathon	Brian Kilby	2:16:45	Basil Heatley	2:19:56	Brian Woolford	2:23:46
steeplechase	Maurice Herriott	8:47.8	Ernie Pomfret	8:56.2	George Howard	8:58.0
120y hurdles	Laurie Taitt	14.1 =NR	Mike Parker	14.2	(United States) Steve Cortright	14.2
440y hurdles	(United States) Willie Atterberry	51.07	John Cooper	51.65	Robin Woodland	52.20
2 miles walk	Ken Matthews	13:18.2	(Italy) Abdon Pamich	13:41.4	Paul Nihill	14:03.8
7 miles walk	Ken Matthews	49:52.8	Vaughan Thomas	53:42.0	John Godbeer	53:50.0
high jump	(Japan) Kuniyoshi Sugioka	2.032	(Scotland) Crawford Fairbrother	1.981	(Nigeria) Joseph Kadiri	1.956
pole vault	(United States) John Pennel	5.10 WR	(United States) John Rose (United States) John Cramer	4.57	n/a	
long jump	Fred Alsop	7.52	(Wales) Lynn Davies	7.50	(Japan) Takayuki Okazaki	7.35
triple jump	(Japan) Koji Sakurai	15.63	Mike Ralph	15.34	Fred Alsop	15.28
shot put	(Scotland) Mike Lindsay	17.64	Martyn Lucking	16.39	David Harrison	15.83
discus throw	(United States) David Weill	53.90	(Scotland) Mike Lindsay	52.93	(United States) Robert Baxter	46.24
hammer throw	(Japan) Takeo Sugawara	65.56	(Japan) Noboru Okamoto	62.52	Howard Payne	61.98
javelin throw	Colin Smith	72.47	Dick Miller	70.55	John Greasley	69.90
decathlon	(Australia) Zlatko Sumich	6538	(New Zealand) Roy Williams	6150	(Scotland) John Jones	5895

== See also ==
- 1963 WAAA Championships
