= Mike Cushion =

British triple jumper

Personal information
- Nationality: British (English)
- Born: 4 April 1942 Norwich, England

Sport
- Sport: Athletics
- Event: Discus throw
- Club: Woodford Green AC

Michael John Cushion (born 4 April 1942) is a former international athlete who competed at the Commonwealth Games.

== Biography ==
Cushion from Norwich, was a member of the Woodford Green AC and specialised in the discus throw and represented Surrey at county level.

Cushion finished third at the AAA Championships, behind Șerban Ciochină and Fred Alsop at the 1968 AAA Championships.

Cushion represented the England team at the 1970 British Commonwealth Games in Edinburgh, Scotland, where he competed in the discus throw event.
