= Charles Lively (athlete) =

British athlete

Personal information
- Nationality: British (English)
- Born: 11 June 1893 Wolston, Warwickshire, England
- Died: January 1971 (aged 77) Warwick, England

Sport
- Sport: Athletics
- Events: Long jump Triple jump
- Club: Sparkhill Harriers

Charles Edward Lively (11 June 1893 – January 1971) was a British Olympic athlete.

== Career ==
Lively became the British triple jump champion after winning the AAA Championships title at the 1920 AAA Championships.

One month later, he competed at the 1920 Summer Olympics in Antwerp, Belgium, where he competed in the men's long jump and the men's triple jump.

Lively finished third behind John Odde in the triple jump event at the 1923 AAA Championships.
