= List of British champions in 5000 metres =

The British 5,000 metres athletics champions covers four competitions; the current British Athletics Championships which was founded in 2007, the preceding AAA Championships (1880-2006), the Amateur Athletic Club Championships (1866-1879) and finally the UK Athletics Championships which existed from 1977 until 1997 and ran concurrently with the AAA Championships. The distance was originally 4 miles but in 1932 switched to 3 miles.

Where an international athlete won the AAA Championships the highest ranking UK athlete is considered the National Champion in this list. Between 1977 and 1994, and again in 1997, two events effectively crowned national champions each year. The official UK Athletics Championships (not to be confused with the current championships, a rebranded British Athletics Championships) were specifically only open to British nationals and were organised by the national governing body. The AAA Championships continued, and due to their history, continued to be considered by both statisticians and athletes to be the more prestigious championships, with the exception of 1997 where the UK Championships were considered the principle championships for the only time. Winners at the UK Championships were nonetheless considered as having won a national title.

The UK Athletics Championships ceased to exist upon the insolvency of the governing body, the British Athletics Federation. The AAA championships continued until 2006, before they were replaced by the new British Athletics Championships.

== Past winners ==
AAC Championships 4 miles, men's event only
| Year | Men's champion |
|---|---|
| 1866 | Richard Garnett |
| 1867 | Gilbert G. Kennedy |
| 1868 | Walter Chinnery |
| 1869 | Walter Chinnery (2) |
| 1870 | Henry Riches |
| 1871 | John Scott |
| 1872 | James Edgar |
| 1873 | Arthur Somerville |
| 1874 | Walter Slade |
| 1875 | James Gibb |
| 1876 | Alfred Goodwin |
| 1877 | James Gibb (2) |
| 1878 | James Gibb (3) |
| 1879 | James Warburton / Walter George |

AAA Championships 4 miles, men's event only
| Year | Men's champion |
|---|---|
| 1880 | Walter George (2) |
| 1881 | George Nehan |
| 1882 | Walter George (3) |
| 1883 | William Snook |
| 1884 | Walter George (4) |
| 1885 | William Snook (2) |
| 1886 | Charles Rogers |
| 1887 | F. Mills |
| 1888 | Edward Parry |
| 1889 | Sidney Thomas |
| 1890 | James Kibblewhite |
| 1891 | William Morton |
| 1892 | James Kibblewhite (2) |
| 1893 | Charles Pearce |
| 1894 | Fred Bacon |
| 1895 | Henry Munro |
| 1896 | Henry Harrison |
| 1897 | Charles Bennett |
| 1898 | Charles Bennett (2) |
| 1899 | Charles Bennett (3) |
| 1900 | John Rimmer |
| 1901 | Alfred Shrubb |
| 1902 | Alfred Shrubb (2) |
| 1903 | Alfred Shrubb (3) |
| 1904 | Alfred Shrubb (4) |
| 1905 | Josh Smith |
| 1906 | Frederick Hulford |
| 1907 | Alexander Duncan |
| 1908 | Emil Voigt |
| 1909 | Emil Voigt (2) |
| 1910 | Albert Hill |
| 1911 | William Scott |
| 1912 | George Hutson |
| 1913 | George Hutson (2) |
| 1914 | George Hutson (2) |
| 1919 | Ernest Glover |
| 1920 | Joe Blewitt |
| 1921 | Walter Monk |
| 1922 | Joe Blewitt (2) |
| 1923 | Joe Blewitt (3) |
| 1924 | Bill Cotterell |
| 1925 | Joe Blewitt (4) |
| 1926 | Jack Webster |
| 1927 | Charles Frith |
| 1928 | Walter Beavers |
| 1929 | Walter Beavers (2) |
| 1930 | Brian Oddie |
| 1931 | Alec Burns |
3 miles, men's event only
| 1932 | Walter Beavers (3) |
| 1933 | Edward Denison |
| 1934 | Walter Beavers (4) |
| 1935 | Aubrey Reeve |
| 1936 | Peter Ward |
| 1937 | Peter Ward (2) |
| 1938 | Jack Emery |
| 1939 | Jack Emery (2) |
| 1946 | Sydney Wooderson |
| 1947 | Alec Olney |
| 1948 | Alec Olney (2) |
| 1949 | Anthony Chivers |
| 1950 | Alec Olney (3) |
| 1951 | Roy Beckett |
| 1952 | Christopher Chataway |
| 1953 | Gordon Pirie |
| 1954 | Freddie Green |
| 1955 | Christopher Chataway (2) |
| 1956 | Derek Ibbotson |
| 1957 | Derek Ibbotson (2) |
| 1958 | Stan Eldon |
| 1959 | Bruce Tulloh |
| 1960 | Frank Salvat |
| 1961 | Gordon Pirie (2) |
| 1962 | Bruce Tulloh (2) |
| 1963 | Bruce Tulloh (3) |
| 1964 | Bruce Tulloh (4) |
| 1965 | Derek Graham |
| 1966 | Dick Taylor |
| 1967 | Ian McCafferty |
| 1968 | Lachie Stewart |

AAA Championships
| Year | Men's champion |
5,000 metres
| 1969 | Ian Stewart |
| 1970 | Chris Stewart |
| 1971 | Mike Baxter |
| 1972 | Dave Bedford |
| 1973 | Brendan Foster |
| 1974 | Brendan Foster (2) |
| 1975 | Nick Rose |
| 1976 | Brendan Foster (3) |

AAA Championships/WAAA Championships & UK Athletics Championships dual championships era 1977-1987
| Year | AAA Men | Year | WAAA Women | Year | UK Men | UK Women |
|---|---|---|---|---|---|---|
| 1977 | Dave Black | 1977 | nc | 1977 | Nick Rose | nc |
| 1978 | Nick Rose (2) | 1978 | nc | 1978 | Mike McLeod | nc |
| 1979 | Mike McLeod | 1979 | nc | 1979 | Steve Emson | nc |
| 1980 | Dick Callan | 1980 | Sue Hutton | 1980 | David Moorcroft | nc |
| 1981 | Geoff Smith | 1981 | Kathryn Binns | 1981 | Dave Clarke | nc |
| 1982 | Tim Hutchings | 1982 | Julie Asgill | 1982 | Tim Hutchings | Kathryn Binns |
| 1983 | Steve Harris | 1983 | Paula Fudge | 1983 | Nat Muir | Yvonne Murray |
| 1984 | Nick Rose (3) | 1984 | Shireen Samy | 1984 | Eamonn Martin | Angela Tooby |
| 1985 | David Lewis | 1985 | Alison Hollington | 1985 | Eamonn Martin (2) | Angela Tooby (2) |
| 1986 | Tim Hutchings (2) | 1986 | Marina Samy | 1986 | Jack Buckner | nc |
| 1987 | Jack Buckner | 1987 | Catherine Newman | 1987 | Simon Mugglestone | nc |

AAA Championships & UK Athletics Championships dual championships era 1988-1997
| Year | Men AAA | Women AAA | Year | Men UK | Women UK |
|---|---|---|---|---|---|
| 1988 | Eamonn Martin | Jane Shields | 1988 | Mark Harris | Liz McColgan |
| 1989 | Mark Rowland | Sue Crehan | 1989 | Steve Cram | Susan Tooby |
| 1990 | Eamonn Martin (2) | Sally Ellis | 1990 | Simon Mugglestone (2) | nc |
| 1991 | Eamonn Martin (3) | Amanda Wright | 1991 | Ian Hamer | nc |
| 1992 | Jack Buckner (2) | Amanda Wright (2) | 1992 | Ian Robinson | nc |
| 1993 | Jon Brown | Suzanne Rigg | 1993 | Jon Brown | nc |
| 1994 | Dermot Donnelly | Shireen Barbour | n/a | | |
| 1995 | Robert Denmark | Alison Wyeth | n/a | | |
| 1996 | John Nuttall | Paula Radcliffe | n/a | | |
| 1997 | Kristen Bowditch | Andrea Whitcombe | 1997 | Adrian Passey | Paula Radcliffe |

AAA Championships second era 1998-2006
| Year | Men's champion | Women's champion |
|---|---|---|
| 1998 | Karl Keska | Andrea Whitcombe (2) |
| 1999 | Rob Denmark (2) | Hayley Haining |
| 2000 | Andres Jones | Paula Radcliffe (2) |
| 2001 | Jon Wild | Jo Pavey |
| 2002 | Jon Wild (2) | Hayley Yelling (2) |
| 2003 | Andrew Graffin | Hayley Yelling (3) |
| 2004 | Chris Thompson | Catherine Berry |
| 2005 | Mark Miles | Hayley Yelling (4) |
| 2006 | Peter Riley | Jo Pavey (2) |

British Athletics Championships 2007 to present
| Year | Men's champion | Women's champion |
|---|---|---|
| 2007 | Mo Farah | Jo Pavey (3) |
| 2008 | Andy Vernon | Jo Pavey (4) |
| 2009 | Scott Overall | Freya Murray |
| 2010 | Chris Thompson ^{(2)} | Freya Murray ^{(2)} |
| 2011 | Mo Farah^{(2)} | Julia Bleasdale |
| 2012 | Ross Millington | Jo Pavey ^{(5)} |
| 2013 | Andy Vernon ^{(2)} | Stephanie Twell |
| 2014 | Tom Farrell | Emelia Gorecka |
| 2015 | Tom Farrell ^{(2)} | Stephanie Twell ^{(2)} |
| 2016 | Andrew Butchart | Stephanie Twell ^{(3)} |
| 2017 | Andrew Butchart ^{(2)} | Stephanie Twell ^{(4)} |
| 2018 | Marc Scott | Stephanie Twell ^{(5)} |
| 2019 | Andrew Butchart ^{(3)} | Eilish McColgan |
| 2020 | Marc Scott ^{(2)} | Jessica Judd |
| 2021 | Patrick Dever | Jessica Judd ^{(2)} |
| 2022 | Marc Scott ^{(3)} | Amy-Eloise Markovc |
| 2023 | James West | Jessica Warner-Judd^{(3)} |
| 2024 | James West ^{(2)} | Hannah Nuttall |
| 2025 | Josh Kerr | Hannah Nuttall ^{(3)} |
| 2026 | David Mullarkey | Hannah Nuttall ^{(4)} |

- nc = not contested
