= Paul Herbert =

Paul Herbert may refer to:

- Paul M. Herbert (1889–1983), American politician, Lieutenant Governor of Ohio
- Paul Herbert (athlete) (born 1964), British middle-distance runner
- Paul Herbert (golfer) in Lord Derby's Young Professionals' Tournament

== See also ==
- Paul Hebert (disambiguation)
