= Sidney Cross =

Sidney Cross may refer to:

- Sidney Cross (gymnast) (1891–1964), British Olympic gymnast
- Sidney Cross (athlete) (1925–2010), British Olympic triple jumper
