= 1959 AAA Championships =

Outdoor track and field competition

- Dates: 10–11 July 1959
- Host city: London, England
- Venue: White City Stadium
- Level: Senior
- Type: Outdoor

The 1959 AAA Championships was the 1959 edition of the annual outdoor track and field competition organised by the Amateur Athletic Association of England (AAA). It was held from 10 to 11 July 1959 at White City Stadium in London, England.

== Summary ==
The Championships covered two days of competition. The marathon was held in Watford and the decathlon event was held in Wolverhampton.

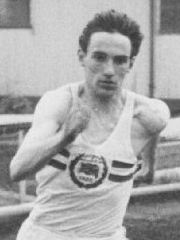
Peter Radford won the 100 yards

== Results ==
Event	Gold		Silver		Bronze	
100 yards	Peter Radford	9.7w	Jimmy Omagbemi	9.7w	(Wales) Ron Jones	9.9w
220 yards	David Jones	21.7	David Segal	21.7	Peter Radford	21.9
440 yards	John Wrighton	47.5	Malcolm Yardley	47.8	Peter Higgins	48.4
880 yards	Brian Hewson	1:52.0	Mike Rawson	1:52.3	Derek Johnson	1:52.5
1 mile	Ken Wood	4:08.1	John Anderson	4:08.5	Brian Kent-Smith	4:08.6
3 miles	Bruce Tulloh	13:31.2	Kevin Gilligan	13:36.4	Stan Eldon	13:38.6
6 miles	Stan Eldon	28:12.4	(Wales) John Merriman	28:15.8	Mike Bullivant	28:25.0
10 miles	Frederick Norris	48:32.4 NR	Basil Heatley	48:58.4	Ivor Edmonds	51:51.0
marathon	Christopher Fleming-Smith	2:30:11.6	Colin Kemball	2:33:50	Len Jones	2:36:13
steeplechase	Maurice Herriott	8:52.8	David Stearns	8:55.6	Eddie Ellis	8:58.4
120y hurdles	Vic Matthews	14.5w	(Pakistan) Ghulam Raziq	14.5w	Laurie Taitt	14.5w
220y hurdles	John Metcalf	23.8	Fred Alsop	23.9	Ken Wilmshurst	24.2
440y hurdles	Chris Goudge	52.7	John Metcalf	53.2	Tom Bryan	53.2
2 miles walk	Ken Matthews	13:19.4	Stan Vickers	13:47.1	George Williams	14:00.4
7 miles walk	Ken Matthews	50:28.8	Stan Vickers	51:08.6	Eric Hall	53:04.2
high jump	(Scotland) Crawford Fairbrother	2.007	Gordon Miller	1.981	(Ghana) Robert Kotei	1.956
pole vault	(Pakistan) Allah Ditta	4.11	(Norway) Hermund Hogheim (Belgium) Paul Coppejans; Rex Porter	3.96	n/a	
long jump	(Scotland) David Whyte	7.24	David Brigden	7.03	John Whall	7.00
triple jump	John Whall	15.00	Mike Ralph	14.75	David Field	14.46
shot put	Arthur Rowe	17.95	(Scotland) Mike Lindsay	17.26	Martyn Lucking	16.58
discus throw	(Scotland) Mike Lindsay	53.53	Eric Cleaver	51.02	Otto Feldmanis	46.47
hammer throw	Mike Ellis	61.28	(Pakistan) Muhammad Iqbal	58.82	Howard Payne	55.48
javelin throw	Colin Smith	69.90	Peter Cullen	68.94	(Pakistan) Jalal Khan	66.92
decathlon	Colin Andrews	5517	(Wales) Hywel Williams	5486	Seamus McKinney	5185

== See also ==
- 1959 WAAA Championships
