= Harold Langley =

Harold Langley may refer to:

- Harold D. Langley, American historian
- Harold Langley (athlete), British athlete

== See also ==
- Harry Langley, architect
