= 1987 AAA Championships =

Outdoor track and field competition

- Dates: 1–2 August 1987
- Host city: London, England
- Venue: Crystal Palace National Sports Centre
- Level: Senior
- Type: Outdoor

The 1987 AAA Championships sponsored by (Kodak) was the 1987 edition of the annual outdoor track and field competition organised by the Amateur Athletic Association (AAA). It was held from 1 to 2 August 1987 at the Crystal Palace National Sports Centre in London, England.

== Summary ==
The Championships covered two days of competition and was the last time that men's only events were held because from 1988 the WAAA Championships would merge with the AAA Championships.

The 1987 London Marathon determined the marathon AAA champion.

The decathlon was held in Stoke-on-Trent from 30 to 31 May 1987.

== Results ==
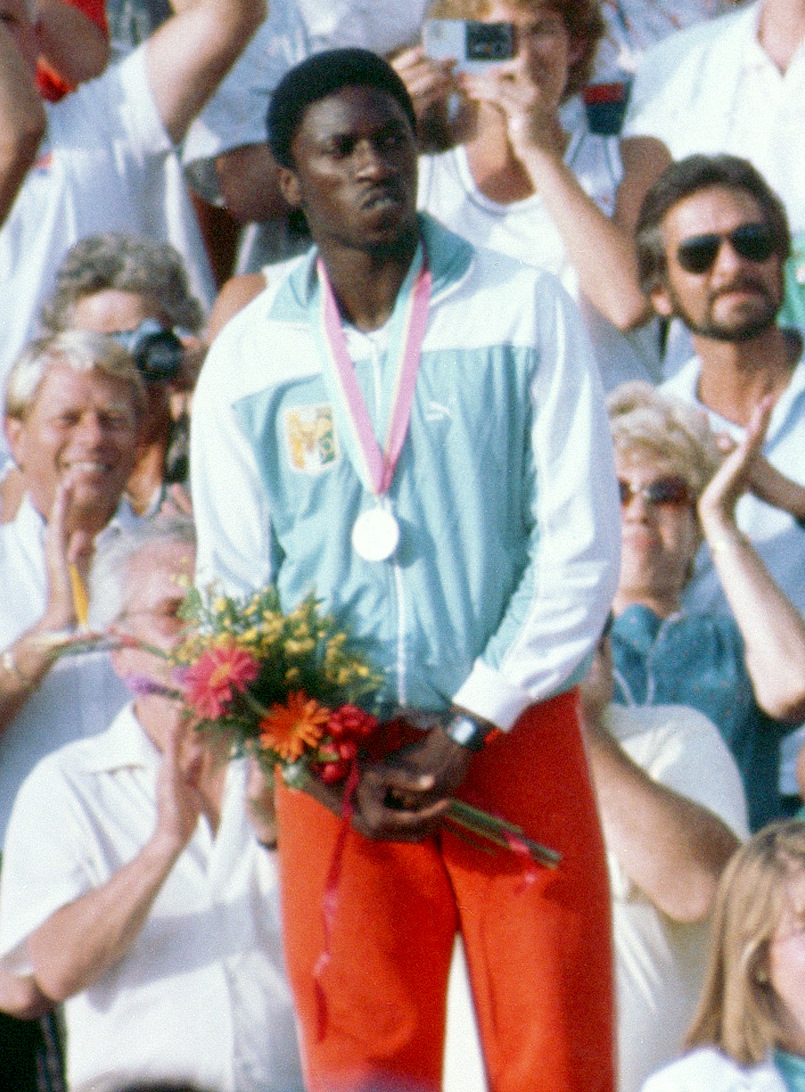
Gabriel Tiacoh, winner of the 400 metres

| Event | Gold | | Silver | | Bronze | |
|---|---|---|---|---|---|---|
| 100m | (United States) Dwayne Evans | 10.33 | John Regis | 10.37 | (Scotland) Allan Wells | 10.39 |
| 200m | John Regis | 20.25 | (United States) Dwayne Evans | 20.26 | (United States) Harvey McSwain | 20.40 |
| 400m | (Ivory Coast) Gabriel Tiacoh | 45.10 | Derek Redmond | 45.17 | Phil Brown | 45.73 |
| 800m | Peter Elliott | 1:48.71 | Tony Morrell | 1:48.78 | (Australia) Pat Scammell | 1:48.91 |
| 1,500m | Steve Crabb | 3:41.23 | Adrian Passey | 3:41.70 | John Gladwin | 3:42.14 |
| 5,000m | Jack Buckner | 13:25.02 | Gary Staines | 13:30.53 | Steve Binns | 13:32.95 |
| 10,000m | Jon Solly | 27:51.76 | Steve Binns | 27:58.61 | Mike McLeod | 28:02.83 |
| marathon | Hugh Jones | 2:10:11 | Charlie Spedding | 2:10:32 | (Scotland) John Graham | 2:12:32 |
| 3000m steeplechase | Eddie Wedderburn | 8:24.78 | (France) Bruno Le Stum | 8:27.47 | (Scotland) Tom Hanlon | 8:28.29 |
| 110m hurdles | Jon Ridgeon | 13.36 | (Wales) Nigel Walker | 13.76 | (United States) Renaldo Nehemiah | 13.84 |
| 400m hurdles | Max Robertson | 49.51 | Martin Gillingham | 49.91 | Martin Briggs | 50.18 |
| 10,000m walk | Ian McCombie | 41:16.14 | Andi Drake | 42:06.73 | Mark Easton | 42:18.92 |
| high jump | (Scotland) Geoff Parsons | 2.24 | (United States) Hollis Conway | 2.24 | Dalton Grant | 2.20 |
| pole vault | Jeff Gutteridge | 5.35 | Keith Stock | 5.00 | Brian Hooper; Mike Edwards | 4.90 |
| long jump | (United States) Mike Powell | 7.94 | (Australia) David Culbert | 7.75 | Keith Fleming | 7.50 |
| triple jump | Eric McCalla | 16.86 | John Herbert | 16.79 | Francis Agyepong | 16.41 |
| shot put | (Wales) Paul Edwards | 17.26 | (Australia) John McNamara | 16.80 | (Wales) Shaun Pickering | 16.80 |
| discus throw | Paul Mardle | 57.34 | Peter Gordon | 54.74 | (New Zealand) Mark Robinson | 52.54 |
| hammer throw | David Smith | 70.60 | (New Zealand) Angus Cooper | 69.90 | Paul Head | 66.78 |
| javelin throw | Mick Hill | 81.68 | David Ottley | 78.36 | Roald Bradstock | 76.42 |
| decathlon | Ken Hayford | 7388 | Alex Kruger | 7228 | (Republic of Ireland) Kevin Atkinson | 7199 |

== See also ==
- 1987 WAAA Championships
