= Paul Hebert =

Paul Hebert or Hébert may refer to:

- Paul Octave Hébert (1818–1880), American politician and army general
- Paul M. Hebert (1907–1977), American judge and former president of Louisiana State University
- Paul Hébert (1924–2017), Canadian actor
- Paul D. N. Hebert (born 1947), Canadian biologist

== See also ==
- Paul Ebert (1932–2009), director of the American College of Surgeons
- Paul Herbert (disambiguation)
- Paul Hiebert (writer) (1892–1987), Canadian writer and humorist
