= Efe Uwaifo =

British athlete

Personal information
- Nationality: British (English)
- Born: 15 May 1995 (age 31)

Sport
- Sport: Track and Field
- Event: Triple jump
- Club: Harrow AC
Medal record
Representing England
British Championships
Gold medal – first place	2023 Manchester	triple jump
Gold medal – first place	2024 Manchester	triple jump

Efe Uwaifo (born 15 May 1995) is a British triple jumper. In 2023, he became the British champion in the Triple jump.

== Biography ==
Uwaifo was educated at Haberdashers' Boys' School and Harvard University, he came to prominence when he won the bronze medal at the 2021 British Athletics Championships.

He became the British champion in 2023, after winning the gold medal at the triple jump at the 2023 British Athletics Championships, held in Manchester and successfully defended his title in 2024.
