= 1926 AAA Championships =

Outdoor track and field competition

- Dates: 2–3 July 1926
- Host city: London, England
- Venue: Stamford Bridge
- Level: Senior
- Type: Outdoor
- Events: 21

The 1926 AAA Championships was the 1926 edition of the annual outdoor track and field competition organised by the Amateur Athletic Association (AAA). It was held from 2 to 3 July 1926 at Stamford Bridge in London, England.

The Championships consisted of 21 events and covered two days of competition. The marathon was held from Windsor to Stamford Bridge on 29 May.

== Results ==
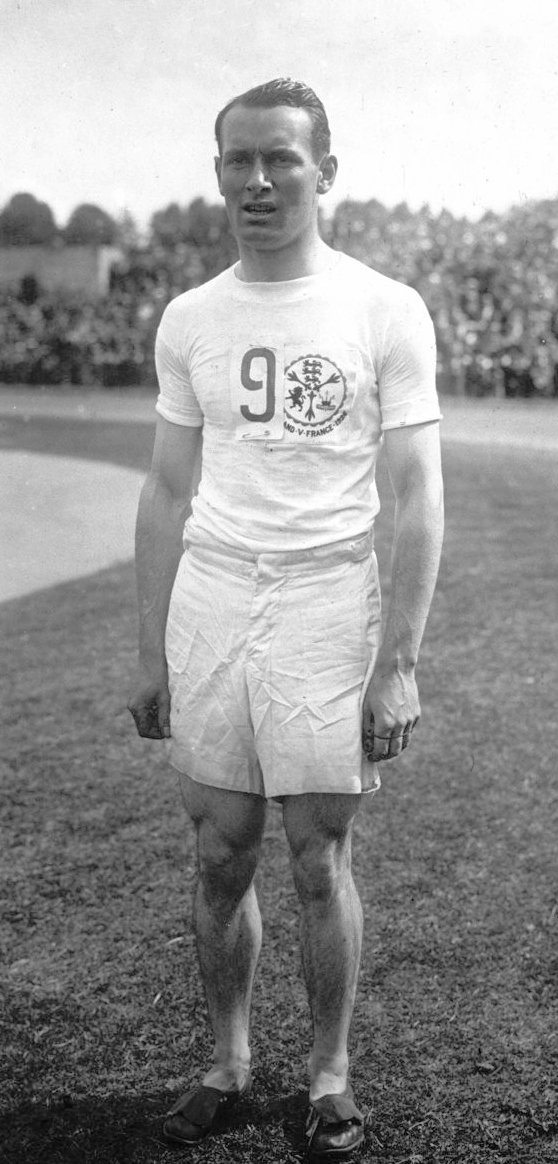
John Rinkel

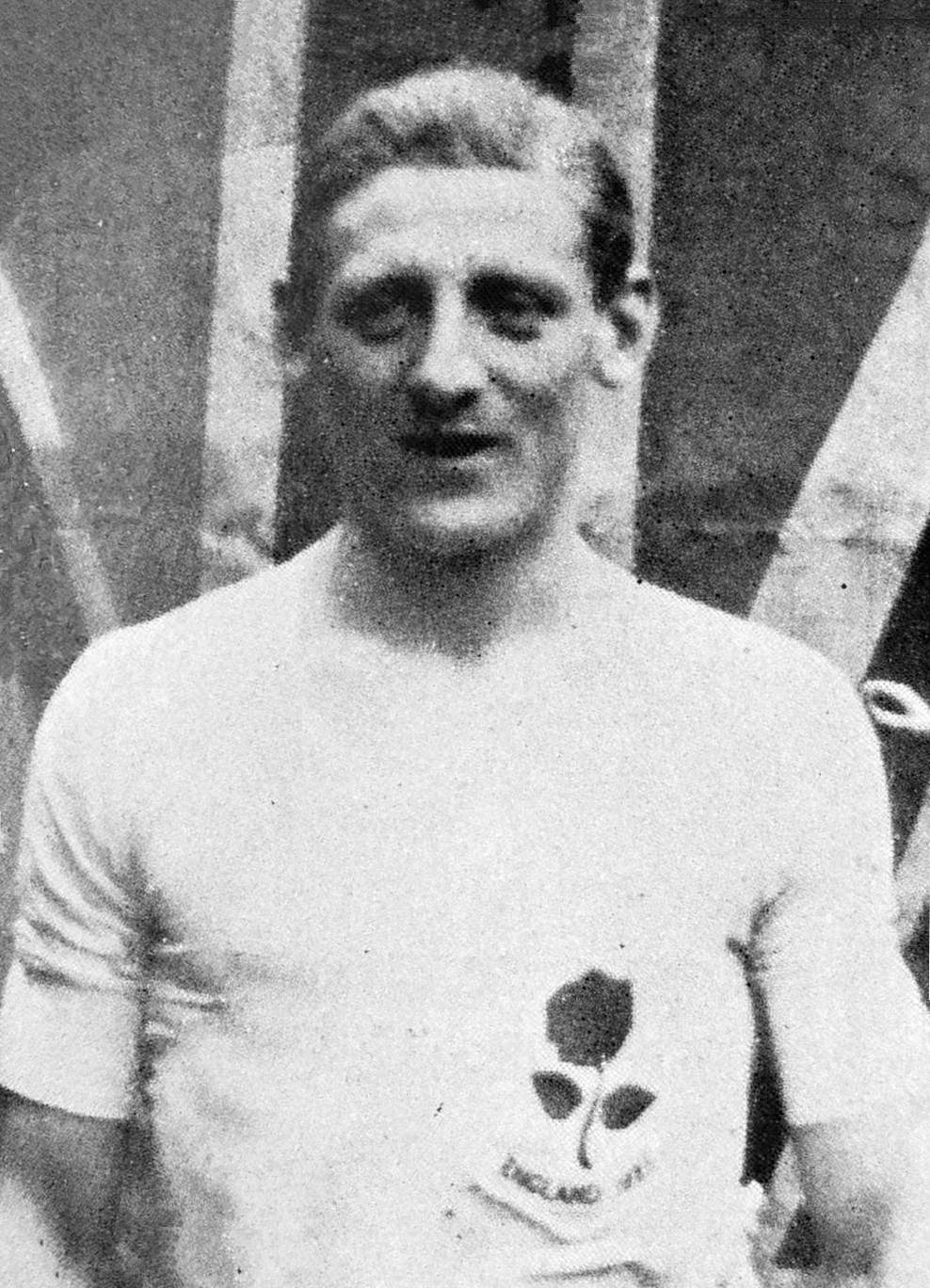
Ernie Harper won his second 10 miles title

Event	Gold		Silver		Bronze	
100 yards	(Germany) Richard Corts	10.0	Jack London	½ yd	(Germany) Helmut Körnig	inches
220 yards	Guy Butler	21.9	(Germany) Joachim Büchner	2 ft - 1½ yd	(New Zealand) Arthur Porritt	1 ft
440 yards	John Rinkel	49.8	(Germany) Otto Peltzer	2 ft	(Netherlands) Adriaan Paulen	
880 yards	(Germany) Otto Peltzer	1:51.6 WR	Dougles Lowe	1:52.0 NR	(Wales) Cecil Griffiths	6-7 yd
1 mile	(France) Georges Baraton	4:17.4	(Germany) Herbert Böcher	3 yd	(Scotland) Tom Riddell	4:18.4
4 miles	Jack Webster	19:49.6	Herbert Johnston	20:04.8	George Webb	20:13.0
10 miles	Ernest Harper	52:04.2	Phillip Francis	53:23.6	C. W. Vincent	53:37.0
marathon	(Northern Ireland) Sam Ferris	2:42:24.2	Albert Mills	2:46:11.2	Matthew Maleedy	2:51:50.0
steeplechase	Jack Webster	10:34.2	George Constable	11:21.8	A. J. Smith	11:28.2
120y hurdles	Frederick Gaby	15.2 =NR	(South Africa) George Weightman-Smith	inches	Lord Burghley	1 ft
440y hurdles	Lord Burghley	55.0 NR	(Scotland) Thomas Livingstone-Learmonth	2-2½ yd	(Poland) Stefan Kostrewski	5-12 yd
2 miles walk	Wilf Cowley	14:32.4	C. W. Cater	14:40.0	Lloyd Johnson	14:43.0
7 miles walk	Reg Goodwin	53:56.0	C. C. Coulson	54:44.6	Wilf Cowley	55:23.6
high jump	(Dominion of Ceylon) Carl Van Geysel	1.854	John Pendlebury	1.829	(Hungary) Ferenc Orbán	1.803
pole jump	(United States) Franklin Kelley	3.66	(Hungary) János Karlovits	3.50	James Campbell	3.35
long jump	(Australia) Richard Honner	7.21	(Hungary) Tibor Püspöki	6.89	(Italy) Virgilio Tommasi	6.86
triple jump	Jack Higginson	13.87	(Norway) Sverre Helgesen	13.84	Harold Langley	13.51
shot put	Rex Woods	13.69	(Hungary) József Daranyi	13.60	(Norway) Hjalmar Johnsen	13.30
discus throw	(Republic of Ireland) Paddy Bermingham	43.38	(Norway) Ketil Askildt	42.45	(Germany) Hans Hoffmeister	41.31
hammer throw	Malcolm Nokes	48.62	(New Zealand) John McHolm	42.16	(Italy) Armando Poggioli	41.76
javelin throw	(Norway) Olav Sunde	61.34	(Hungary) Béla Szepes	56.90	(South Africa) Edward Sutherland	51.10

== See also ==
- 1926 WAAA Championships
