= Eric McCalla =

British triple jumper

Personal information
- Nationality: British (English)
- Born: 18 August 1960 (age 65) Birmingham, England
- Height: 79 cm (2 ft 7 in)
- Weight: 82 kg (181 lb)

Sport
- Sport: Athletics
- Event: Triple jump
- Club: Birchfield Harriers

Eric McCalla (born 18 August 1960) is a British athlete. He competed in the men's triple jump at the 1984 Summer Olympics.

== Biography ==
MCalla finished second behind American Mike Conley in the triple jump event at the 1983 AAA Championships but by virtue of being the highest placed British athlete was considered the British triple jump champion.

He represented Great Britain at the 1984 Olympic Games in Los Angeles, where he finished 8th in the triple jump competition.

McCalla won the UK Athletics Championships at the 1985 UK Athletics Championships in Antrim but his best year was arguably 1987, when he won the AAA title outright at the 1987 AAA Championships and won a second UK title at the 1987 UK Athletics Championships in Derby.
