= 1985 AAA Championships =

Outdoor track and field competition

- Dates: 13–14 July 1985
- Host city: London, England
- Venue: Crystal Palace National Sports Centre
- Level: Senior
- Type: Outdoor

The 1985 AAA Championships sponsored by (Kodak) was the 1985 edition of the annual outdoor track and field competition organised by the Amateur Athletic Association (AAA). It was held from 13 to 14 July 1985 at the Crystal Palace National Sports Centre in London, England.

== Summary ==
The Championships covered two days of competition.

The 1985 London Marathon determined the marathon AAA champion and the decathlon was held in Birmingham on 20–21 July 1985.

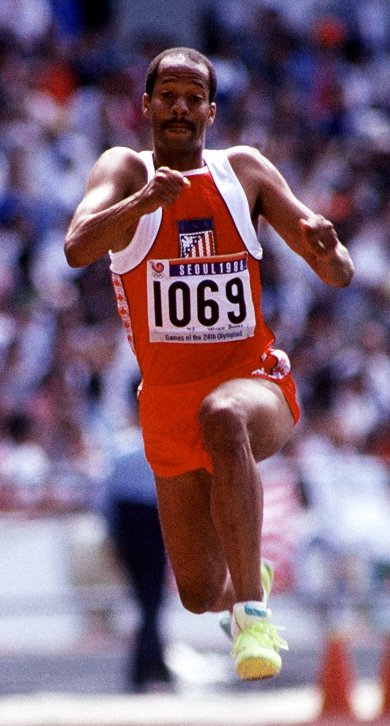
Willie Banks won the triple jump

== Results ==
Event	Gold		Silver		Bronze	
100m+	(Ghana) Ernest Obeng	10.44	(United States) Darwin Cook	10.45	(Nigeria) Chidi Imoh	10.46
200m	Ade Mafe	20.99	Buster Watson	21.02	Mike McFarlane	21.02
400m	(Australia) Darren Clark	45.45	Derek Redmond	45.52	(United States) Mark Rowe	45.78
800m	(Brazil) José Luiz Barbosa	1:45.48	(United States) Eugene Sanders	1:45.58	(Kenya) Edwin Koech	1:46.58
1,500m	(Republic of Ireland) Marcus O'Sullivan	3:40.27	(Republic of Ireland) Ray Flynn	3:40.59	(Scotland) Alistair Currie	3:41.09
5,000m	David Lewis	13:42.82	Paul Davies-Hale	13:42.99	(Republic of Ireland) John Treacy	13:44.68
10,000m	(United States) Kevin Ryan	28:50.70	Karl Harrison	28:52.46	Carl Thackery	28:54.90
marathon	(Wales) Steve Jones	2:08:16	Charlie Spedding	2:08:33	(Scotland) Allister Hutton	2:09:16
3000m steeplechase	(United States) Brian Diemer	8:31.51	Kevin Capper	8:38.11	(Republic of Ireland) Brendan Quinn	8:42.05
110m hurdles	(United States) Henry Andrade	13.83	(Wales) Nigel Walker	13.98	(United States) Dannie Jackson	14.02
400m hurdles	(Brunei) Ahmed Hamada	49.82	Max Robertson	50.16	(Nigeria) Henry Amike	50.25
3,000m walk	Ian McCombie	11:41.73 NR	Phil Vesty	11:54.57	Martin Rush	12:04.28
10,000m walk	(New Zealand) Murray Day	43:35.3	Roger Mills	43:48.9	Adrian James	44:58.1
high jump	(Canada) Milt Ottey	2.28	(United States) Brian Stanton	2.28	(Cuba) Jorge Alfaro	2.28
pole vault	(United States) Kory Tarpenning	5.40	(United States) Mike Tully (United States) Tim Bright	5.30	n/a	
long jump	(United States) Dannie Jackson	7.89	Derrick Brown	7.80	John Herbert	7.74
triple jump	(United States) Willie Banks	17.22	(United States) Robert Cannon	16.87	John Herbert	16.85
shot put	Billy Cole	17.88	(Australia) Stuart Gyngell	17.48	(Trinidad and Tobago) Hubert Maingot	17.03
discus throw	(Cuba) Juan Martínez Brito	65.72	(Cuba) Luis Delís	65.34	Paul Mardle	58.28
hammer throw	David Smith	77.30	(Republic of Ireland) Declan Hegarty	76.02	Martin Girvan	73.42
javelin throw	David Ottley	88.32	Mick Hill	79.56	(Japan) Masami Yoshida	79.08
decathlon	Greg Richards	7456	Tom Leeson	7385	Mark Luscombe	6999

+Mike McFarlane finished third but was disqualified for running out of his lane and Lincoln Asquith finished fifth and was the leading British athlete.

== See also ==
- 1985 WAAA Championships
