= 1971 AAA Championships =

Outdoor track and field competition

- Dates: 23–24 July 1971
- Host city: London, England
- Venue: Crystal Palace National Sports Centre
- Level: Senior
- Type: Outdoor

The 1971 AAA Championships was the 1971 edition of the annual outdoor track and field competition organised by the Amateur Athletic Association (AAA). It was held from 23 to 24 July 1971 at Crystal Palace National Sports Centre in London, England.

== Summary ==
The Championships covered two days of competition. The marathon was held in Manchester and the decathlon event was held in Blackburn.

The championships were held at the Crystal Palace National Sports Centre for the first time.

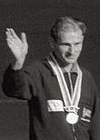
Paul Nihill won his 7th AAA title

== Results ==
Event	Gold		Silver		Bronze	
100m	Brian Green	10.57	(Scotland) Les Piggot	10.81	(Scotland) Don Halliday	10.90
200m	Alan Pascoe	21.09	Martin Reynolds	21.35	Ralph Banthorpe	21.41
400m	(Scotland) David Jenkins	47.10	Len Walters	47.21	Derek Price	47.32
800m	Peter Browne	1:47.54	Dave Cropper	1:48.28	Phil Lewis	1:48.50
1,500m	(New Zealand) Tony Polhill	3:40.34	(Scotland) Peter Stewart	3:40.37	Brendan Foster	3:40.69
5,000m	Mike Baxter	13:39.63	Alan Blinston	13:46.22	Adrian Weatherhead	13:47.28
10,000m	Dave Bedford	27:47.0 ER	Jack Lane	28:39.6	(France) Noël Tijou	28:44.2
10 miles	Trevor Wright	46:51.6	Ron Grove	48:05.8	Keith Angus	48:24.8
marathon	Ron Hill	2:12:39	Trevor Wright	2:13:27	(East Germany) Jürgen Busch	2:14:03
3000m steeplechase	Andy Holden	8:37.96	David Camp	8:42.38	Steve Hollings	8:45.80
110m hurdles	Alan Pascoe	14.49	Berwyn Price	14.63	Graham Gower	14.72
400m hurdles	John Sherwood	51.38	Dave Schärer	51.78	Bob Roberts	52.09
3,000m walk	Paul Nihill	12:08.4	Phil Embleton	12:30.2	(Scotland) Bill Sutherland	12:52.0
10,000m walk	Phil Embleton	45:26.2	Carl Lawton	46:31.4	Alan Smallwood	48:04.6
high jump	Michael Campbell	2.04	David Livesey	2.02	Colin Boreham	2.00
pole vault	Mike Bull	5.05	Brian Hooper	4.81	(Australia) Ed Johnson	4.81
long jump	(United States) Henry Hines	8.01	Alan Lerwill	7.98	(Wales) Lynn Davies	7.77
triple jump	Tony Wadhams	15.16	David Johnson	15.12	Tony Ababio	15.03
shot put	(New Zealand) Les Mills	19.27	Geoff Capes	18.30	Jeff Teale	17.91
discus throw	(New Zealand) Les Mills	58.62	John Watts	57.88 NR	Bill Tancred	55.20
hammer throw	Howard Payne	66.44	Barry Williams	62.14	Bruce Fraser	59.64
javelin throw	Dave Travis	77.00	Mladen Gavrilovic	74.94	John McSorley	72.88
decathlon	(Scotland) David Kidner	6691	Mike Corden	6195	(Barbados) Clifford Brooks	6064

== See also ==
- 1971 WAAA Championships
