= 1924 AAA Championships =

Outdoor track and field competition

- Dates: 20–21 June 1924
- Host city: London, England
- Venue: Stamford Bridge
- Level: Senior
- Type: Outdoor
- Events: 20

The 1924 AAA Championships was the 1924 edition of the annual outdoor track and field competition organised by the Amateur Athletic Association (AAA). It was held from 20 to 21 June 1924 at Stamford Bridge in London, England. The attendance was estimated to be around 30,000.

The Championships consisted of 20 events and covered two days of competition.

== Results ==
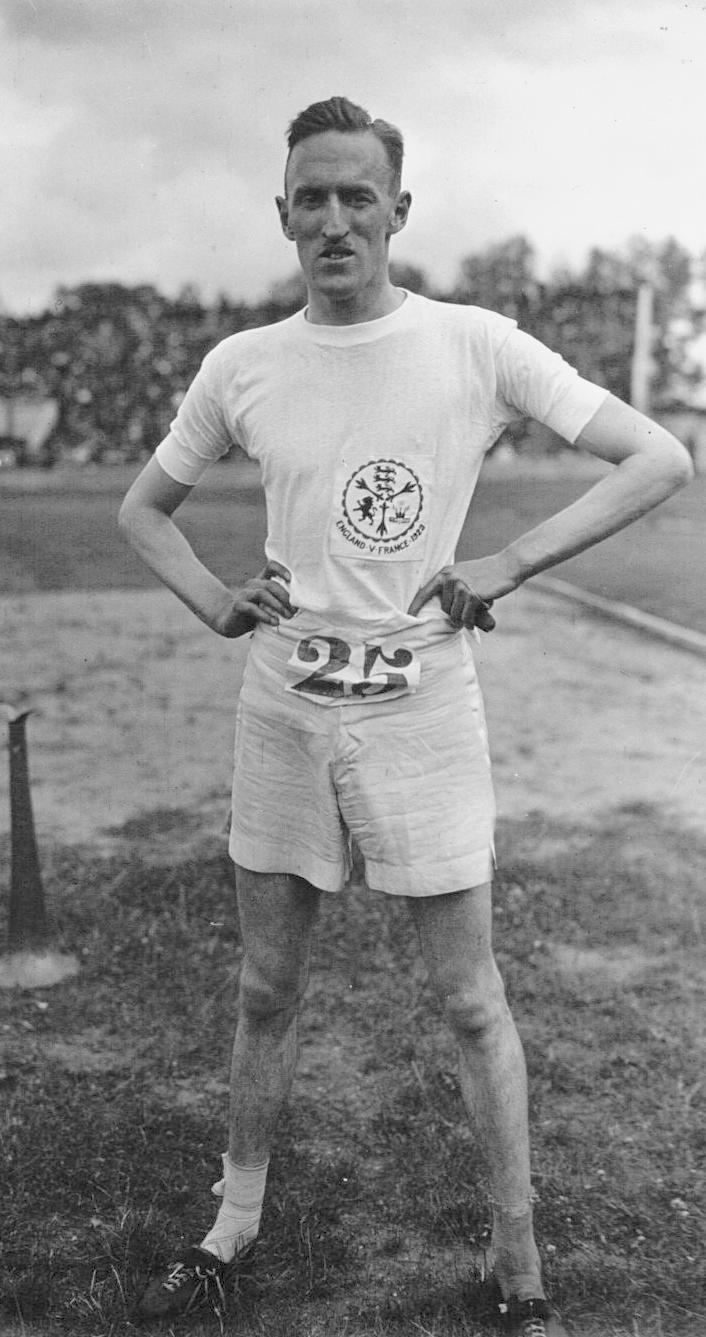
Henry Stallard

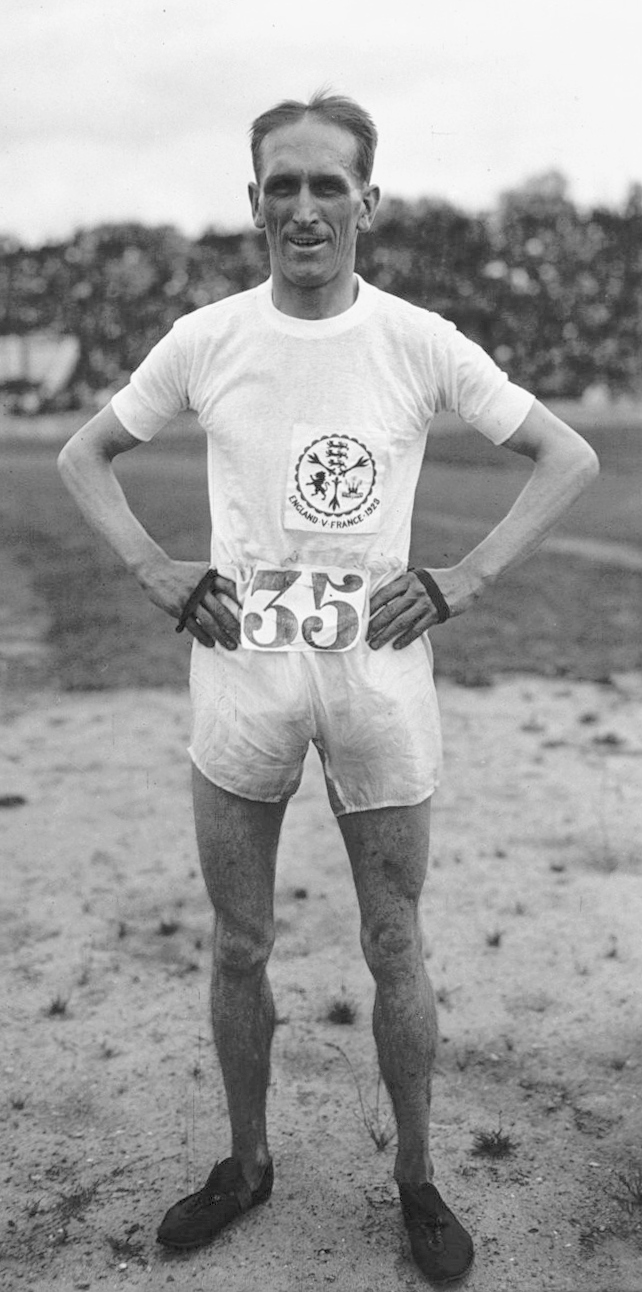
Halland Britton

Event	Gold		Silver		Bronze	
100 yards	Harold Abrahams	9.9	Wilfred Nichol	1½ yd	Lancelot Royle	1 yd
220 yards	(South Africa) Howard Kinsman	21.7	(Scotland) Eric Liddell	2½ yd	(New Zealand) Arthur Porritt	1 ft
440 yards	(Scotland) Eric Liddell	49.6	(Canada) David Johnson	4 yd	(United States) William Stevenson	3 yd
880 yards	Henry Stallard	1:54.6 NR	Dougles Lowe	1:54.8	(Wales) Cecil Griffiths	7-8 yd
1 mile	William Seagrove	4:21.2	Herbert Johnston	3 yd	Walter Porter	2 yd
4 miles	Bill Cotterell	19:45.6	Frederick Saunders	19:50.0	Ernest Harper	19:56.0
10 miles	Halland Britton	52:48.8	Ernest Harper	52:50.0	Charles Clibbon	53:21.8
steeplechase	Joe Blewitt	11:02.0	Evelyn Montague	11:23.0	(Scotland) David Cummings	11:29.0
120y hurdles	(South Africa) Sidney Atkinson	15.1	Frederick Gaby	6 yd	Leopold Partridge	1 yd
440y hurdles	Wilfrid Tatham	57.6	Frederick Blackett	2 ft	David Bone	
2 miles walk	Reg Goodwin	14:11.2	C.C. Coulson	14:19.2	Gordon Watts	14:22.0
7 miles walk	Reg Goodwin	52:00.6	Gordon Watts	52:13.2	C. E. Ward	54:03.0
high jump	(Republic of Ireland) Larry Stanley	1.867	Arthur Willis	1.854	(Scotland) Crawford Kerr (South Africa) Bob Roberts (South Africa) Edward Sutherland	1.803; 1.803; 1.803
pole jump	(Australia) Donald Sumner	3.12	James Campbell		n/a	
long jump	Harold Abrahams	6.92	(Scotland) Christopher Mackintosh	6.68	Guy Brockington	6.51
triple jump	Jack Higginson	13.99 NR	John Odde	13.41	Harold Langley	13.31
shot put	Rex Woods	13.36	(Republic of Ireland) John O'Grady	13.27	Charles Beckwith	13.12
discus throw	(Republic of Ireland) Paddy Bermingham	41.18	(Scotland) Donald Ross	34.12	Charles Best	33.62
hammer throw	Malcolm Nokes	51.12	(Scotland) Tom Nicolson	45.97	John Freeborn	38.07
javelin throw	(South Africa) Edward Sutherland	53.02	(Seychelles) Henri Dauban	50.48	(Scotland) James Dalrymple	46.75

== See also ==
- 1924 WAAA Championships
