= Georgina Forde-Wells =

British athlete

Personal information
- Nationality: British
- Born: 14 November 2002 (age 23)

Sport
- Sport: Track and field
- Event: Triple jump
- Club: Woodford Green Essex Ladies

Achievements and titles
- Personal bests: Triple Jump: 13.98 m (Alexandria, 2025)
Medal record
Representing England
British Athletics Championships
Gold medal – first place	2023 Manchester	triple jump
Gold medal – first place	2026 Birmingham	triple jump

Georgina Forde-Wells (born 14 November 2002) is a British triple jumper. She is a multiple-time British champion.

== Early life ==
From Northampton, Forde-Wells attended Northampton High School. She was a member of Rugby & Northampton Athletics Club before competing for Woodford Green & Essex Ladies. As a youngster, she also took part in gymnastics and netball.

== Career ==
Forde-Wells finished in fourth place in the triple jump at the 2019 English Schools Championships. In 2020, she jumped a new personal best distance of 12.43m to win the bronze medal at the England U20s indoor Championships.

In February 2023, she won the British Universities Indoor Championships triple jump competition.

She was selected for the British team for the 2023 European Athletics Team Championships held in Chorzów, Silesia, Poland in June 2023. Competing in the triple jump, she finished 15th.

In July 2023, she became the British triple jump champion, winning the gold medal at the 2023 British Athletics Championships, in Manchester, with a new personal best jump of 13.56m.

She won the triple jump at the 2025 British Indoor Athletics Championships in Birmingham. In June 2025, she jumped a new personal best of 13.98 metres whilst competing in Alexandria, Greece. She was selected for the triple jump at the 2025 European Athletics Team Championships in Madrid in June 2025, placing tenth overall with a jump of 13.26 metres. She was named in the British team for the 2025 Summer World University Games in Germany.

Forde-Wells jumped 13.53 metres to win the 2026 British Indoor Athletics Championships in Birmingham on 15 February 2026. She placed fifteenth at the 2026 World Athletics Indoor Championships in Toruń, Poland. On 21 June, Forde-Wells won the triple jump title at the 2026 UK Athletics Championships in Birmingham with 13.34 metres. She was selected to represent England at the 2026 Commonwealth Games in Glasgow and placed fifth in the triple jump with 13.70m.

== Personal life ==
Forde-Wells attends Loughborough University.
