= 1977 AAA Championships =

Outdoor track and field competition

- Dates: 22–23 July 1977
- Host city: London, England
- Venue: Crystal Palace National Sports Centre
- Level: Senior
- Type: Outdoor

The 1977 AAA Championships sponsored by Nationwide was the 1977 edition of the annual outdoor track and field competition organised by the Amateur Athletic Association (AAA). It was held from 22 to 23 July 1977 at the Crystal Palace National Sports Centre in London, England.

== Summary ==
The Championships covered two days of competition. The marathon was held in Rugby and the decathlon was held in Wolverhampton.

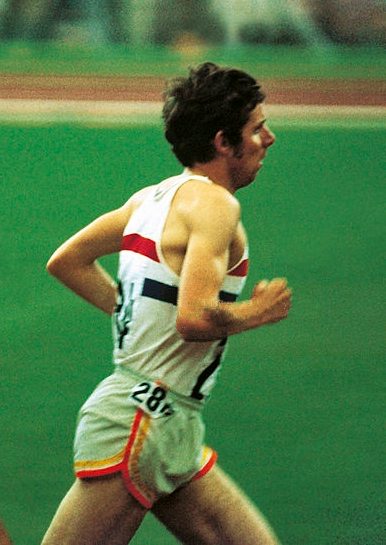
Brendan Foster won another AAA title

== Results ==
Event	Gold		Silver		Bronze	
100m	(United States) Clancy Edwards	10.48	(United States) Charlie Wells	10.65	Tim Bonsor	10.74
200m	(United States) Clancy Edwards	21.05	Glen Cohen	21.58	(Jamaica) Anthony Davies	21.96
400m	(United States) Tom Andrews	45.96	(Scotland) David Jenkins	46.34	(Trinidad and Tobago) Mike Solomon	46.48
800m	(Socialist Federal Republic of Yugoslavia) Milovan Savić	1:46.25	Sebastian Coe	1:46.83	(New Zealand) John Walker	1:46.86
1,500m	(Republic of Ireland) Eamonn Coghlan	3:43.02	Glen Grant	3:43.80	(Scotland) John Robson	3:43.83
5,000m	Dave Black	13:33.1	Bernie Ford	13:34.8	(Kenya) Samson Kimobwa	13:39.3
10,000m	Brendan Foster	27:45.66	Dave Black	28:19.04	(Kenya) Joshua Kimeto	28:36.43
marathon	Dave Cannon	2:15:02	Colin Kirkham	2:16:02	Graham Dugdale	2:17:16
3000m steeplechase	Dennis Coates	8:28.26	Tony Staynings	8:38.93	Andy Holden	8:42.76
110m hurdles	(Wales) Berwyn Price	14.17	Mark Holtom	14.34	Bob Danville	14.41
400m hurdles	(United States) Rich Graybehl	49.96	Alan Pascoe	50.95	(Australia) Garry Brown	51.10
3,000m walk	Roger Mills	12:08.36	(New Zealand) Graham Seatter	12:14.91	Brian Adams	12:39.81
10,000m walk	Brian Adams	44:10.0	Roger Mills	44:42.0	Amos Seddon	45:04.0
high jump	Alan Dainton	2.14	Mark Naylor	2.10	Milton Palmer	2.05
pole vault	(United States) Larry Jessee	5.30	Brian Hooper	5.20	Keith Stock	5.10
long jump	Daley Thompson	7.52	Aston Moore	7.38	Billie Kirkpatrick	7.31
triple jump	David Johnson	16.07	Megarry Effiong	15.61	Chris Colman	15.61
shot put	Geoff Capes	20.70	(United States) Pete Schmock	19.56	Mike Winch	18.65
discus throw	Peter Tancred	57.58	Richard Slaney	57.04	John Hillier	56.70
hammer throw	(Scotland) Chris Black	69.50	(Scotland) Paul Buxton	66.18	Jim Whitehead	63.88
javelin throw	David Ottley	77.78	Peter de Kremer	75.40	Dave Travis	74.88
decathlon	Pan Zeniou	7087	Nick Phipps	6936	(Scotland) Brad McStravick	6799

== See also ==
- 1977 WAAA Championships
