= Michael Ralph (athlete) =

British triple jumper

Personal information
- Nationality: British (English)
- Born: 4 July 1938 (age 88) Leeds, England
- Height: 173 cm (5 ft 8 in)
- Weight: 63 kg (139 lb)

Sport
- Sport: Athletics
- Event: Triple jump
- Club: Oxford University AC; Achilles Club; Myron AC

Michael Ralph (born 4 July 1938) is a British retired athlete who competed at the 1964 Summer Olympics.

== Biography ==
Ralph was a member of the British Army (Duke of Wellington Regiment) based in Holywood, County Down and represented the England athletics team in the triple jump at the 1958 British Empire and Commonwealth Games in Cardiff, Wales.

Ralph finished second behind John Whall in the triple jump event at the 1959 AAA Championships and after being the best placed British athlete at the 1962 AAA Championships and the 1963 AAA Championships was considered the British triple jump champion.

Ralph went to study at St Edmund Hall, Oxford and was Oxford University's association football captain. He was the 1961 Northern Counties champion and played for Wycombe Wanderers F.C..

At the 1964 Olympic Games in Tokyo, he represented Great Britain in the men's triple jump.
