= John Odde =

British triple jumper (1898–1972)

Personal information
- Nationality: British/Norwegian
- Born: 29 October 1898 Camberwell, South London
- Died: 31 July 1972 (aged 73) Kingston upon Thames, Surrey

Sport
- Sport: Athletics
- Event: Triple jump
- Club: Polytechnic Harriers

Hans Johannes Odde better known as John Odde (29 October 1898 – 31 July 1972) was a British/Norwegian athlete.

== Biography ==
Odde was the son of a Norwegian diplomat, winning the 1916 Norwegian triple jump title. He finished third behind Folke Jansson in the triple jump event at the 1921 AAA Championships.

Odde became the national triple jump champion after winning the AAA Championships title at the 1923 AAA Championships, where he set a national record of 14.13 metres. He had previously held the title of British champion but only by virtue of finishing as the highest placed British athlete at the 1922 AAA Championships.

After finishing second behind Jack Higginson in the triple jump event at the 1924 AAA Championships, he competed in the men's triple jump at the 1924 Summer Olympics in Paris.
