= David Johnson (triple jumper) =

English athlete

Personal information
- Nationality: British (English)
- Born: 18 May 1953 (age 73)

Sport
- Sport: Athletics
- Event: triple jump
- Club: Sheffield City AC

David Clement Johnson (born 18 May 1953), is a male former athlete who competed for England.

== Biography ==
Johnson was educated at Richmond College in Sheffield and was member of Sheffield City AC. He finished second behind Tony Wadhams in the triple jump event at the 1971 AAA Championships.

The following year he became the British triple jump champion after winning the British AAA Championships title at the 1972 AAA Championships. He took a break from the sport due to injuries before returning in 1974 and won a second AAA title at the 1977 AAA Championships.

Johnson represented England in the triple jump, at the 1978 Commonwealth Games in Edmonton, Canada.

Johnson coaches Jude Bright-Davies, Leila Newth, and Tito Odunaike.
