= John Caine (runner) =

British athlete

Personal information
- Nationality: British (English)
- Born: 7 June 1946 (age 80) County Durham, England

Sport
- Sport: Athletics
- Event: long distance
- Club: Gateshead Harriers

John Caine (born 7 June 1946), is a male former athlete who competed for Great Britain and England.

== Biography ==
Caine was born in County Durham and was a member of Gateshead Harriers, where he trained with Brendan Foster. He was a Great Britain and England international and ran long distance races.

Caine finished third behind Ron Hill in the 10 miles event at the 1969 AAA Championships.

He represented England in the 10,000 metres, at the 1970 British Commonwealth Games in Edinburgh, Scotland.
