= Bruce Fraser (athlete) =

English hammer thrower

Personal information
- Nationality: British (English)
- Born: 30 January 1946 (age 80) Tynemouth, England

Sport
- Sport: Athletics
- Event: hammer throw
- Club: Borough Road College/North Shields Polytechnic
Medal record
Athletics
Representing England
Commonwealth Games
Silver medal – second place	1970 Edinburgh	hammer throw

Bruce Fraser (born 30 January 1946), is a British former hammer thrower who competed for England.

== Biography ==
Fraser finished second behind Howard Payne in the hammer throw event at the 1969 AAA Championships.

He represented England and won a silver medal in the hammer throw, at the 1970 British Commonwealth Games in Edinburgh, Scotland.

Fraser also reached the podium at the 1971 AAA Championships.
