= 2023 British Athletics Championships =

Athletics event

- Dates: 8–9 July
- Host city: Manchester, United Kingdom
- Venue: Manchester Regional Arena
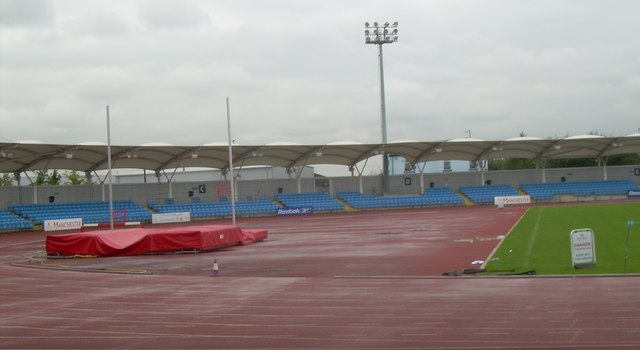
- Level: Senior
- Type: Outdoor

The 2023 British Athletics Championships was the national championships in outdoor track and field for athletes in the United Kingdom, which also served as a qualifying event for the 2023 World Athletics Championships. On 28 July, 51 British athletes were chosen for the World Championships.

== Background ==
In April 2023, UK Athletics confirmed that the 2023 British Athletics Championships would be held in Manchester on 8 and 9 July. The Championships were used as the main qualification method for the 2023 World Athletics Championships in August 2023; competitors qualified automatically for the World Championships if they finished in the top two in the event, and reached the competition's qualifying standard. UK Athletics could then allocate an additional World Championships place for each event. On 28 July, UK Athletics announced that 51 British athletes had been selected for the World Championships, based on these criteria; the number was the lowest since 2005, as UK Athletics did not allow British athletes to receive wildcard places for the World Championships. In the United Kingdom, the Championships were shown on BBC both on television and online.

The British title in the 10,000 metres was held in May 2023 as part of the Night of the 10,000m PBs event. The races featured British and non-British athletes, and the top finishing Britons, who were awarded the British titles, were Jessica Warner-Judd and Andrew Butchart respectively.

== Highlights ==
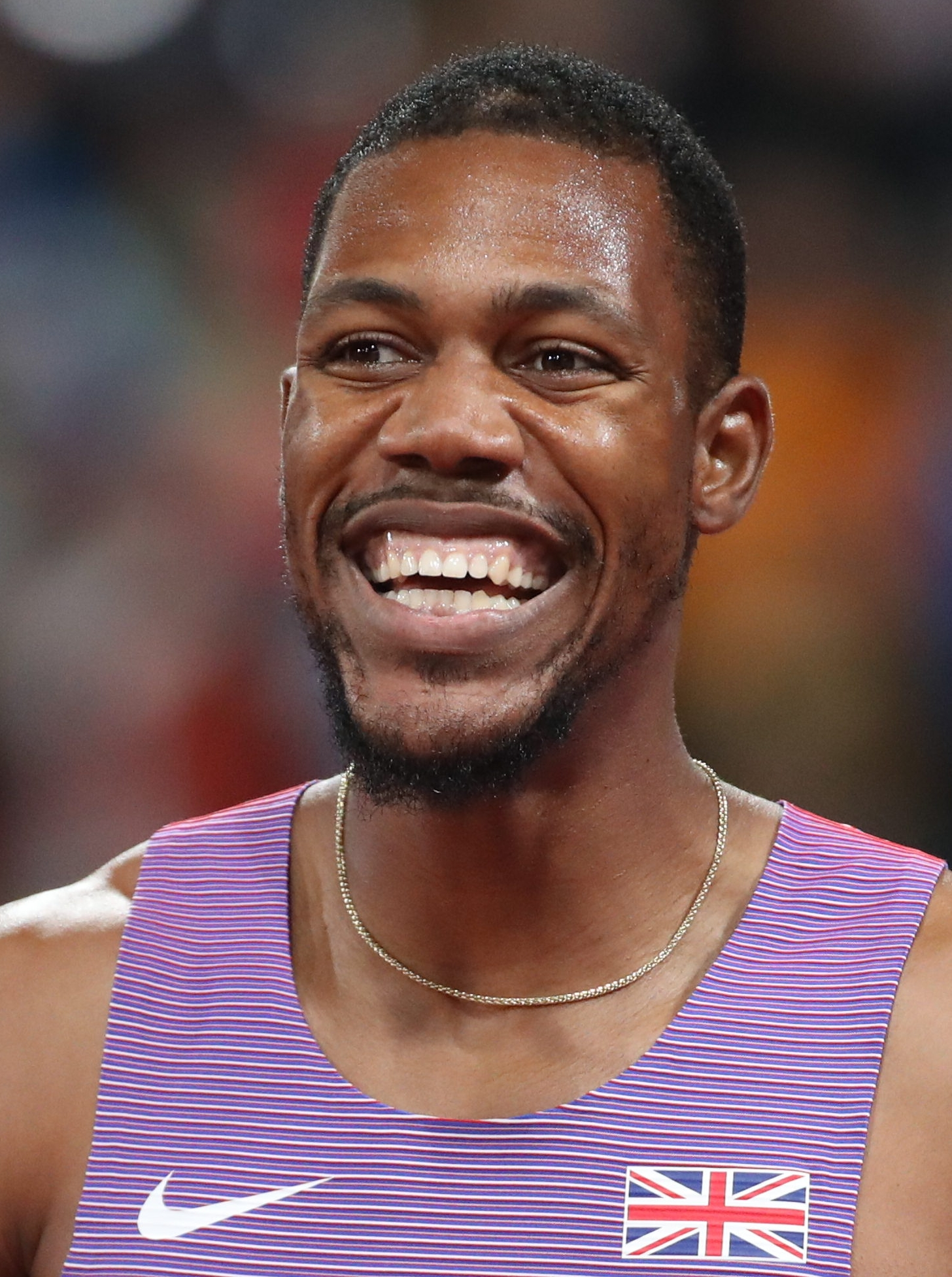
Zharnel Hughes won both the 100 and 200 metres events.

There was heavy rain during the first day of the Championships, which caused the men's 100 metres race to be run in the middle of a downpour. The men's 100 and 200 metres events were both won by Zharnel Hughes, making him the first man to achieve the British Championships sprint double since Marlon Devonish in 2007. Hughes' time of 19.77 seconds for the 200 metres race was faster than John Regis' British record, however a large tailwind prevented Hughes' time from counting for record purposes. After the race, Hughes described the conditions as "the worst ever".

The women's 100 metres race was delayed due to the rain, and was won by Dina Asher-Smith, her fifth British title in the event. The race was run in dry conditions. Daryll Neita, who won the 100 and 200 metres events in 2022, retained her 200 metres title. She had chosen only to run the 200 metres race at the 2023 Championships.

Molly Caudery won the women's pole vault ahead of Holly Bradshaw, who had not lost in the British Championships since 2010. Caudery qualified for the World Championships as a result. Katie Snowden was a surprise winner of the 1500 metres race, beating favourite Laura Muir.

== Results ==
=== Men ===
Event	Gold		Silver		Bronze	
100 metres	Zharnel Hughes	10.03s	Reece Prescod	10.14s	Eugene Amo-Dadzie	10.18s
200 metres	Zharnel Hughes	19.77s	Joe Ferguson	20.43s	Jona Efoloko	20.45s
400 metres	Alex Haydock-Wilson	45.97s	Lewis Davey	46.40s SB	Michael Ohioze	46.41s
800 metres	Daniel Rowden	1:45.13 SB	Ben Pattison	1:45.15 SB	Max Burgin	1:45.16
1500 metres	Neil Gourley	3:46.16	Elliot Giles	3:46.48	George Mills	3:46.57
5000 metres	James West	13:42.03 PB	Emile Cairess	13:43.17	Thomas Mortimer	13:44.29
10,000 metres (Note: The 10,000 metres events were held in May 2023. Non-British athletes were allowed to compete at the event, only the top 3 British competitors are listed here.)	Andrew Butchart	27:47.43	Mahamed Zakaraiy	27:57.56 PB	Ellis Cross	28:27.01 PB
110 metres hurdles	Tade Ojora	13.16s	Joshua Zeller	13.34s	Sam Bennett	13.46s
400 metres hurdles	Alastair Chalmers	49.49s SB	Seamus Derbyshire	49.58s	Maranga Mokaya	50.32s
3000 metres steeplechase	Will Battershill	8:44.19	Zak Seddon	8:44.94	Jamaine Coleman	8:54.40
5000 metres walk	Christopher Snook	21:35.72	Cameron Corbishley	22:27.65	Luc Legon	22:54.91
Long jump	Jacob Fincham-Dukes	7.86m	Jack Roach	7.79m SB	Jake Burkey	7.76m
High jump	Joel Clarke-Khan	2.18m SB	William Grimsey	2.15m	Luke Ball	2.09m
Triple jump	Efe Uwaifo	16.20m	Jude Bright-Davies	16.01m	Seun Okome	15.93m PB
Pole vault	Charlie Myers	5.20m	Lazarus Benjamin; Adam Hague	5.00m	Not awarded	
Shot put	Scott Lincoln	20.46m	Youcef Zatat	18.78m PB	Patrick Swan	17.59m
Discus throw	Lawrence Okoye	61.68m	Nicholas Percy	61.26m	Greg Thompson	58.66m
Hammer throw	Jake Norris	74.75m PB	Ben Hawkes	70.08m PB	Craig Murch	70.02m
Javelin throw	Benjamin East	72.97m	Michael Allison	69.73m	Joe Dunderdale	68.69m

=== Women ===
Event	Gold		Silver		Bronze	
100 metres	Dina Asher-Smith	11.06s	Imani Lansiquot	11.26s	Bianca Williams	11.29s
200 metres	Daryll Neita	22.25s CR	Bianca Williams	22.59s	Finette Agyapong	22.69s PB
400 metres	Victoria Ohuruogu	50.89s	Ama Pipi	51.52s	Yemi Mary John	51.61s
800 metres	Keely Hodgkinson	1:58.26 SB	Jemma Reekie	1:58.92 SB	Alexandra Bell	2:00.68 SB
1500 metres	Katie Snowden	4:09.86	Laura Muir	4:10.24	Melissa Courtney-Bryant	4:11.91
5000 metres	Jessica Warner-Judd	15:53.50	Amy-Eloise Markovc	15:58.87	Abbie Donnelly	16:04.78
10,000 metres	Jessica Warner-Judd	31:09.28	Samantha Harrison	31:11.40 PB	Amy-Eloise Markovc	31:17.81 PB
100 metres hurdles	Cindy Sember	12.98s	Isabel Wakefield	13.05s PB	Marli Jessop	13.30s PB
400 metres hurdles	Jessie Knight	54.97s	Lina Nielsen	55.62s	Emily Newnham	57.13s PB
3000 metres steeplechase	Poppy Tank	10:02.77 PB	Alice Murray Gourley	10:05.06 PB	Stevie Lawrence	10:06.99
5000 metres walk	Heather Warner	22:22.50 SB	Bethan Davies	22:55.85 SB	Abigail Jennings	24:11.68 PB
Long jump	Jazmin Sawyers	6.86m	Jade O'Dowda	6.64m	Lucy Hadaway	6.60m
High jump	Morgan Lake	1.90m	Emily Madden Forman	1.81m PB	Gabrielle Garner	1.81m PB
Triple jump	Georgina Forde-Wells	13.56m PB	Temi Ojora	13.40m	Adelaide Omitowoju	13.10m PB
Pole vault	Molly Caudery	4.71m PB	Holly Bradshaw	4.61m SB	Felicia Miloro	4.15m
Shot put	Adele Nicoll	17.26m SB	Amelia Strickler	16.83m	Divine Oladipo	16.28
Discus throw	Jade Lally	60.13m	Kirsty Law	57.30m SB	Zara Obamakinwa	55.99m PB
Hammer throw	Charlotte Payne	69.14m	Anna Purchase	68.53m	Kayleigh Presswell	66.35m PB
Javelin throw	Bekah Walton	58.19m	Freya Jones	53.65m SB	Lauren Farley	53.18m
