= Arthur Gray (athlete) =

English athletics competitor

Personal information
- Nationality: British (English)

Sport
- Sport: Athletics
- Event: triple jump
- Club: Polytechnic Harriers; Ilford AC

Arthur John Gray was an athlete who competed for England in the high jump and triple jump.

== Biography ==
Gray finished third behind Willem Peters in the triple jump event at the 1929 AAA Championships and the following year in 1930 repeated the performance at the 1930 AAA Championships.

Gray finally became the national high jump champion after winning the British AAA Championships title at the 1931 AAA Championships. The following year he became the national triple jump champion at the 1932 AAA Championships.

Gray competed for England in the high jump and triple jump at the 1934 British Empire Games in London.
