= Athletics at the 1970 British Commonwealth Games – Men's discus throw =

Men's discus throw at the 1970 British Commonwealth Games
- Venue: Meadowbank Stadium, Edinburgh
- Dates: 21 July 1970

Medalists
gold medal	George Puce	Canada
silver medal	Les Mills	New Zealand
bronze medal	Bill Tancred	England

The men's discus throw event at the 1970 British Commonwealth Games was held on 21 July at the Meadowbank Stadium in Edinburgh, Scotland.

== Results ==
Final results
Rank	Name	Nationality	Distance	Notes
1st place, gold medalist(s)	George Puce	Canada	59.02	
2nd place, silver medalist(s)	Les Mills	New Zealand	57.84	
3rd place, bronze medalist(s)	Bill Tancred	England	56.68	
4	Arthur McKenzie	England	55.34	
5	Zigurd Stauts	Canada	55.20	
6	Robin Tait	New Zealand	53.82	
7	Joe Antunovich	New Zealand	53.50	
8	Mike Cushion	England	51.34	
9	Mike Lindsay	Scotland	50.94	
10	Dave Steen	Canada	50.64	
11	John Walters	Wales	48.06	
12	Yovan Ochola	Uganda	44.98	
13	Imbert Roberts	Saint Lucia	37.28	
	Praveen Kumar	India	DNS	
