= Andy Vince =

English athlete

Personal information
- Nationality: English
- Born: 1959 (age 65–66) Maldon, Essex

Sport
- Sport: Shot put

Andrew Ivor Vince (born 1959), is a male former athlete who competed for Maldon, Essex England.

== Athletics career ==
Vince was a National champion after winning the 1982 UK Athletics Championships in the shot put. He represented England, at the 1986 Commonwealth Games in Edinburgh, Scotland.

Andy Vince. Head of People Systems and Insight at Barts Health NHS Trust ·

Andy Vince. Regional Vice President Canada at SCA Tissue North America. SCA Tissue North AmericaWeston. Barrie, Ontario, Canada500+ connections.
