= Arthur McKenzie (discus thrower) =

British triple jumper

Personal information
- Nationality: British (English)
- Born: 14 April 1939 Gosforth, England

Sport
- Sport: Athletics
- Events: Discus throw Hammer throw Shot put
- Club: North Shields Polytechnic

Arthur T. McKenzie (born 14 April 1939) is a former international athlete who competed at the Commonwealth Games.

== Biography ==
McKenzie was a member of the North Shields Polytechnic Athletics Club and specialised in throwing events, especially the discus throw. A policeman by profession, he won both events at the 1969 North East Counties Championships.

McKenzie represented the England team at the 1970 British Commonwealth Games in Edinburgh, Scotland, where he competed in the discus throw event, finishing just outside the medals in fourth place.

By 1973 he was competing for Scotland because he had a Scottish father and was the 1973 Scottish champion. He won national police titles at discus, shot and hammer.

As his police career progressed he was a detective for the Criminal Investigation Department and retired after 31 years as a detective inspector. His police career also led to him appearing in multiple TV shows including The Bill and Casualty.
