= Sidney Cross (athlete) =

British triple jumper (1925–2010)

Personal information
- Nationality: British (English)
- Born: 7 July 1925 Birmingham, England
- Died: 11 May 2010 (aged 84) Highbridge, England

Sport
- Sport: Athletics
- Event: Triple jump
- Club: Birchfield Harriers

Sidney Ernest Cross (7 July 1925 – 11 May 2010) was a British athlete who competed at the 1948 Summer Olympics.

== Biography ==
Cross finished third behind Gordon George Avery in the triple jump event at the 1948 AAA Championships. Shortly afterwards he represented the Great Britain team at the 1948 Olympic Games in London, where he participated in the men's triple jump competition.

Cross was twice the British triple jump champion after winning the British AAA Championships titles at the 1950 AAA Championships and the 1951 AAA Championships.

By trade, Cross was a Post Office worker.
