= Harold Langley (athlete) =

British triple jumper

Personal information
- Nationality: British (English)
- Born: 11 June 1903 Sparkhill, Birmingham, England
- Died: 3 March 1988 (aged 84) Acocks Green, Birmingham, England

Sport
- Sport: Athletics
- Event: Triple jump
- Club: Sparkhill Harriers

Harold Arthur Langley (11 June 1903 – 3 March 1988) was a British athlete who competed at the 1924 Summer Olympics.

== Career ==
Langley finished third behind Jack Higginson in the triple jump event at the 1924 AAA Championships. Shortly afterwards he was selected for the British team at the 1924 Olympic Games in Paris, where he competed in the men's triple jump and finished in 15th place.

Langley finished third behind Jack Higginson in the triple jump event at the 1926 AAA Championships.

Langley later finished second behind Willem Peters at the 1929 AAA Championships and finished third behind Jan Blankers at the 1931 AAA Championships.
