= Aileen Mills =

British athlete

Personal information
- Nationality: British (English)
- Born: Q1 1962 Tynemouth, Northumberland, England

Sport
- Sport: Athletics
- Event: hurdles
- Club: North Shields Poly

Aileen Patricia Mills (born Q1 1962) is a female former track and field athlete who competed for England in the 400 metres hurdles.

== Biography ==
Mills became the British champion in 1985 when she won 1985 UK Athletics Championships. The same year she finished second behind Yvette Wray in the 400 metres hurdles event at the 1985 WAAA Championships. and repeated the performance the following year at the 1986 WAAA Championships.

Mills represented England in the 400 metres hurdles event, at the 1986 Commonwealth Games in Edinburgh, Scotland.
