= Paul Herbert (athlete) =

British former middle-distance runner (born 1966)

Paul Herbert (born 20 December 1966) is a British former middle-distance runner who competed in the 800 metres race.
