= Gary Oakes =

British athlete (born 1958)

Personal information
- Nationality: British (English)
- Born: 21 September 1958 (age 67) Kentish Town, London, England
- Height: 177 cm (5 ft 10 in)
- Weight: 69 kg (152 lb)

Sport
- Sport: Athletics
- Event: hurdles
- Club: Haringey AC
Medal record
Men's athletics
Representing Great Britain
Olympic Games
Bronze medal – third place	1980 Moscow	400 m hurdles

Gary James Oakes (born 21 September 1958) is a male British retired athlete who mainly competed in the men's 400 metre hurdles. He competed at the 1980 Summer Olympics.

== Biography ==
Oakes was a member of the Haringey Athletic Club. He finished third behind Alan Pascoe in the 400 metres hurdles event at the 1978 AAA Championships. Shortly afterwards he represented England in the 400 metres hurdles event, at the 1978 Commonwealth Games in Edmonton, Canada.

Oakes finished third again at the 1979 AAA Championships but by virtue of being the highest placed British athlete was considered the British 400 metres hurdles champion. At the 1980 Olympics Games in Moscow, he represented Great Britain, where he won the bronze medal in the 400 metre hurdles.

Oakes won the AAA title outright at the 1981 AAA Championships and the following year represented England, at the 1982 Commonwealth Games in Brisbane, Australia A third Commonwealth Games appearance followed when he represented England, at the 1986 Commonwealth Games in Edinburgh, Scotland.

== Personal life ==
He is married to fellow two-time Olympic bronze medallist Heather Hunte.
