= Tony Wadhams =

British athlete

Personal information
- Nationality: British (English)
- Born: 16 May 1944 (age 82) Tonbridge, Kent, England

Sport
- Sport: Athletics
- Event: triple jump
- Club: Blackheath Harriers

Anthony Edward Wadhams (born 16 May 1944), is a male former athlete who competed for England.

== Biography ==
Wadhams became the British triple jump champion after winning the British AAA Championships title at the 1969 AAA Championships. Wadhams was ranked as the English number one triple jumper and was selected to represent Great Britain at the 1969 European Athletics Championships in Athens.

Wadhans finished runner-up to Japanese athlete Yukito Muraki at the 1970 AAA Championships before he represented England in the triple jump, at the 1970 British Commonwealth Games in Edinburgh, Scotland.

Wadhams won two more AAA titles at the 1971 AAA Championships and the 1973 AAA Championships.
