= Graham Eggleton =

Scottish pole vaulter

Personal information
- Born: Graham Charles Eggleton

Sport
- Sport: Athletics
- Event: Pole vault
Medal record
Representing Scotland
Commonwealth Games
| Bronze medal – third place | 1982 Brisbane | Pole vault |

Graham Charles Eggleton (born 20 May 1959) is a Scottish former athlete who specialised in the pole vault.

As a child, Eggleton would train in his garden by vaulting onto piles of hay with a bamboo pole.

Eggleton was the British national pole vault champion in 1981 and 1982.

The first vaulter from Scotland to clear five metres, Eggleton had a personal best vault of 5.21 metres set in 1982, which remained a Scottish record until bettered by Richard Hurren in 2010.

Eggleton competed at the 1982 Commonwealth Games in Brisbane and was one of three vaulters to register a games record of 5.20 metres, but had to settle for the bronze medal on countback.
