= John Herbert (athlete) =

English sportsperson (born 1962)

Personal information
- Nationality: British (English)
- Born: 20 April 1962 (age 64) Meadows, Nottingham, England
- Height: 188 cm (6 ft 2 in)
- Weight: 76 kg (168 lb)

Sport
- Sport: Athletics /Bobsleigh
- Event: Triple jump / long jump
- Club: Haringey Athletic Club
Medal record
Men's athletics
Representing Great Britain
Summer Universiade
Bronze medal – third place	1983 Edmonton	Triple jump
Bronze medal – third place	1985 Kobe	Triple jump
Representing England
Commonwealth Games
Gold medal – first place	1986 Edinburgh	Triple jump

John Alun Adolphus Herbert (born 20 April 1962) is an English former sportsperson, who represented Great Britain as both a triple jumper and bobsleigh. Competing in athletics, he won the gold medal for England in the triple jump at the 1986 Commonwealth Games in Edinburgh. He represented Great Britain at the 1984 Summer Olympics and 1988 Summer Olympics. He competed in the four-man bobsleigh event at the 1994 Winter Olympics.

== Biography ==
=== Athletics career ===
Herbert was born in Meadows, Nottingham and competed in athletics as a triple jumper in the 1980s and 1990s. He qualified in two Summer Olympics, finishing 10th in 1984, and being eliminated during qualifying for the final in 1988. Herbert also represented Great Britain at the 1983 and 1991 World Championships in Athletics in Helsinki and Tokyo, but did not qualify for the final. In 1985 he won the European Cup in Moscow with a jump of 17'39". He also competed at two World Student Games finishing third at both Edmonton, Canada, 1983 and Kobe, Japan, 1985.

He appeared at three Commonwealth Games; in addition to his gold medal in 1986 he also competed in the 1982 and 1990 Games.

Herbert was a five-times British triple jump champion after winning the British AAA Championships title at the 1988 AAA Championships and 1990 AAA Championships and by virtue of being the highest placed British athlete in 1982, 1984 and 1985. He was also considered the British long jump champion in 1982, after finishing second to Junichi Usui and won the UK Athletics Championships in 1986.

=== Bobsleigh career ===
Herbert switched to bobsleigh in 1993. His best finish at the Winter Olympics was eighth in the four-man event at Lillehammer in 1994 together with Shaun Olson, Dean Ward and Paul Field. Herbert is the first black British athlete to compete in both Winter and Summer Olympics.

=== Coaching career ===
Herbert served as an athletics coach for the jumping events at the 1996, 2000, and 2004 Summer Olympics for Great Britain. He was coach to Olympic silver medallist until 2008 and coached Jade Johnson until 2012.

Herbert was able to transfer his success in athletics into coaching. He is currently National Event coach for Jumps; he was also Great Britain U23 team manager until 2011. As a coach, John has mentored many outstanding British athletes including Phillips Idowu whom he coached from 1998 to 2008.

=== Film, media and art career ===
Herbert has worked for a multitude of media organisations including creative departments at the BBC and as Creative Director at Meridian Broadcasting, part of ITV Network. He now divides his time between philanthropic works and athletics coaching. He is a graduate of the Central School of Art and Design. In 2017, Herbert became involved with the Art of the Olympians.
