= Jack Higginson (athlete) =

British triple jumper

Personal information
- Nationality: British (English)
- Born: 21 June 1891 Preston, England
- Died: 15 October 1966 (aged 75) Nelson, England

Sport
- Sport: Athletics
- Event: Triple jump
- Club: Preston Harriers

John Higginson also known as Jack Higginson (21 June 1891 – 15 October 1966) was a British athlete who competed at the 1924 Summer Olympics.

== Career ==
Higginson became the national triple jump champion after winning the British AAA Championships title at the 1924 AAA Championships. Shortly afterwards he was selected for the British team at the 1924 Olympic Games in Paris, where he competed in the men's triple jump, finishing in 13th place.

Higginson regained his triple jump title at the 1926 AAA Championships. Higginson set a British triple jump record of 14.25 metres in 1926 and his son Jack Higginson Jr. set a record 14.43 metres in 1938.
