= Fred Alsop =

British long jumper

Personal information
- Nationality: British (English)
- Born: 20 October 1938 (age 87) Plaistow, Essex, England
- Height: 183 cm (6 ft 0 in)
- Weight: 75 kg (165 lb)

Sport
- Sport: Athletics
- Event: long jump/triple jump
- Club: Hornchurch Harriers; Mayesbrook AC
Medal record
Representing England
Commonwealth Games
Bronze medal – third place	1962 Perth	triple jump
Bronze medal – third place	1966 Kingston	triple jump

Frederick John Alsop (born 20 October 1938 in Plaistow, Essex) is a British former triple jumper and long jumper who competed at three Olympic Games.

== Biography ==
Alsop competed in the 1960 Summer Olympics, in the 1964 Summer Olympics, and in the 1968 Summer Olympics. His best result was his fourth place in the triple jump at the 1964 Tokyo Olympics.

He represented England and won a bronze medal in the triple jump at the 1962 British Empire and Commonwealth Games in Perth, Western Australia. He repeated the achievement fours years later for the England team by winning another bronze at the 1966 British Empire and Commonwealth Games in Kingston, Jamaica.

Alsop was a six times British triple jump champion (one achieved as the best placed British athlete) and three times British long jump champion. The nine titles were achieved by winning the AAA Championships from 1960 to 1967.
