= UK Athletics Championships =

Athletics competition only open to competitors from the United Kingdom

- Sport: Track and field
- Founded: 1977
- Ceased: 1997
- Country: United Kingdom

The UK Athletics Championships was an annual national championship in track and field for the United Kingdom, organised by the British Athletics Federation. The event incorporated the 1980 Olympic trials for the British Olympic team. The venue for the event was rotational and designed to be inclusive – all four Home Nations hosted the event during its twenty-year existence, as well as several areas of England.

Created in 1977 and open only to British athletes, the event was initiated to provide an alternative to the AAA Championships, which was open to foreign athletes and was organised by an English amateur organisation. The event failed to displace the long-established AAA event and did not attract the nation's best athletes. The event was not part of a formal international selection process and the competition's early scheduling in the calendar was not conducive to participation; the event often took place in May, which was well before the peak of the track and field season in August and early September.

The annual format ceased after 1993. The British Athletics Federation organised a "British Championships" event in 1997, which proved to be the most important domestic competition that season. The bankruptcy of the British Athletics Federation that same year effectively rendered the competition defunct. Both the UK Championships, and the AAA Championships would later be superseded by the British Athletics Championships, organised by UK Athletics – the government-led successor organisation to the British Athletics Federation.

== Events ==
The following athletics events featured as standard on the UK Athletics Championships programme:

- Sprint: 100 m, 200 m, 400 m
- Distance track events: 800 m, 1500 m, 5000 m
- Hurdles: 100 m hurdles (women only), 110 m hurdles (men only), 400 m hurdles, 3000 m steeplechase (men only)
- Jumps: long jump, triple jump, high jump, pole vault
- Throws: shot put, discus, hammer, javelin
- Racewalking: 5000 m walk (women only), 10,000 metres walk (men only)

A men's 3000 metres was contested from 1989 to 1993, while the women's event lasted from 1977 to 1992, being the standard distance event for women at the time. Women raced over 5000 m from 1982 to 1997, with interruptions in 1986–87 and 1990–93. The men's 10,000 metres was stopped after 1988, with a one-off re-instatement in 1997. Women raced over that distance in 1986 and 1997 only. The men's and women's walking events were first introduced at the 1980 edition, though were dropped as a one-off at the 1992 edition. The women's walk was also dropped from the programme for the 1982 championships.

The javelin model used in the men's event changed to the international standard in 1986. In line with international changes, the women's programme gradually expanded to match the men's, with the first triple jump championship held in 1990, then the first women's pole vault and hammer throw UK champions being crowned in 1993.

== Editions ==
Year	City	Venue	Notes
1977	Cwmbran	Cwmbran Stadium	
1978	Edinburgh	Meadowbank Stadium	
1979	Birmingham	Alexander Stadium	
1980	London	Crystal Palace Athletics Stadium	Olympic Trials Meadowbank Stadium, Edinburgh hosted the women's 1500 m and men's 800 m and 5000 m
1981	Antrim	Antrim Stadium	
1982	Cwmbran	Cwmbran Stadium	
1983	Edinburgh	Meadowbank Stadium	
1984	Cwmbran	Cwmbran Stadium	
1985	Antrim	Antrim Stadium	
1986	Cwmbran	Cwmbran Stadium	
1987	Derby	Moorways Stadium	Gateshead International Stadium hosted the men's 10,000 m
1988	Derby	Moorways Stadium	
1989	Jarrow	Monkton Stadium	
1990	Cardiff	Cardiff Athletics Stadium	
1991	Cardiff	Cardiff Athletics Stadium	
1992	Sheffield	Sheffield Hallam UCA Stadium	
1993	London	Crystal Palace Stadium	Bedford International Stadium hosted the racewalks
1997	Birmingham	Alexander Stadium	Sheffield Hallam UCA Stadium hosted the 10,000 m

== Most successful athletes by event ==
Event	Men	Men's titles	Women	Women's titles
100 metres	Linford Christie	6	Heather Oakes	4
200 metres	John Regis	4	Kathy Smallwood-Cook	4
400 metres	Phil Brown	3	Joslyn Hoyte-Smith Linda Keough	3
800 metres	Peter Elliott	3	Christina Boxer	4
1500 metres	Steve Ovett Alan Mottershead Neil Horsfield Steve Crabb	2	Hilary Hollick Gillian Dainty Bev Nicholson Alison Wyeth	2
3000 metres	No multiple champions	—	Liz McColgan	3
5000 metres	Eamonn Martin Simon Mugglestone	2	Angela Tooby	2
10,000 metres	Dave Black	3	No multiple champions	—
3000 m steeplechase	Kevin Capper	3	No multiple champions	—
110/100 m hurdles	Wilbert Greaves Tony Jarrett Colin Jackson	3	Shirley Strong Kay Morley	3
400 m hurdles	Max Robertson	4	Elaine McLaughlin	3
High jump	Geoff Parsons Dalton Grant	3	Diana Davies	4
Pole vault	Andy Ashurst	5	No multiple champions	—
Long jump	Derrick Brown	4	Mary Berkeley Fiona May	3
Triple jump	Aston Moore	5	Michelle Griffith	2
Shot put	Paul Edwards	5	Judy Oakes	10
Discus throw	Paul Mardle	6	Venissa Head Jackie McKernan	5
Hammer throw	Paul Head	7	No multiple champions	—
Javelin throw	David Ottley Mick Hill	5	Fatima Whitbread	8
Race walk	Ian McCombie	5	Lisa Langford	3

== Multiple champions ==
A total of 18 athletes won five or more titles at the UK Athletics Championships. Women's shot putter Judy Oakes won the most titles overall, with ten national wins. Linford Christie was the most successful man, with eight titles across the 100 metres and 200 metres.

Athlete	Titles	Events
Judy Oakes	Shot put	10
Linford Christie	100 metres, 200 metres	8
Fatima Whitbread	Javelin throw	8
Paul Head	Hammer throw	7
Paul Mardle	Discus throw	6
Heather Hunte	100 metres, 200 metres	6
Kathy Smallwood-Cook	100 metres, 200 metres	5
Paula Dunn	100 metres, 200 metres	5
Christina Boxer	800 metres, 1500 metres	5
Liz McColgan	3000 metres, 5000 metres, 10,000 metres	5
Paul Edwards	Shot put	5
Venissa Head	Shot put, Discus throw	8
Jackie McKernan	Discus throw	5
David Ottley	Javelin throw	5
Mick Hill	Javelin throw	5
Ian McCombie	10,000 metres walk	5
Aston Moore	Triple jump	5
Andy Ashurst	Pole vault	5

== See also ==
- List of British athletics champions
