= Athletics at the 1924 Summer Olympics – Men's high jump =

Men's high jump at the Games of the VIII Olympiad
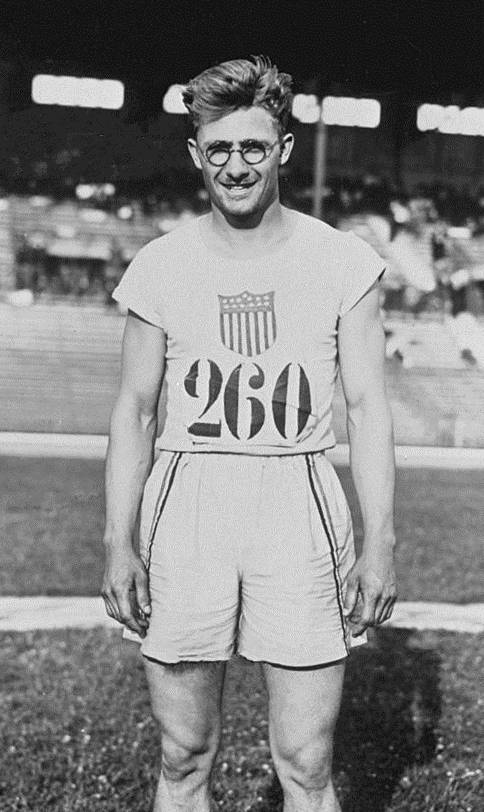
- Harold Osborn
- Venue: Stade Olympique Yves-du-Manoir
- Dates: July 6, 1924 (qualifying); July 7, 1924 (final)
- Competitors: 27 from 17 nations
- Winning height: 1.98 OR

Medalists
1st place, gold medalist(s)		Harold Osborn; United States
2nd place, silver medalist(s)		Leroy Brown; United States
3rd place, bronze medalist(s)		Pierre Lewden; France

The men's high jump event was part of the track and field athletics programme at the 1924 Summer Olympics. The competition was held from Sunday, July 6, 1924, and Monday, July 7, 1924. Twenty-seven high jumpers from 17 nations competed. The maximum number of athletes per nation was 4. The event was won by Harold Osborn of the United States, the nation's seventh consecutive victory in the men's high jump. As in 1920, the Americans went 1–2 in the event, with Leroy Brown earning silver. France took its first high jump medal since 1908 with Pierre Lewden's bronze.

== Background ==
This was the seventh appearance of the event, which is one of 12 athletics events to have been held at every Summer Olympics. The only returning finalist from the 1920 Games was seventh-place finisher Pierre Lewden of France. The heavy favorites in 1924 were Harold Osborn and Leroy Brown of the United States, who "were the dominant jumpers in 1924, with 15 of the best 16 marks on the world lists."

Estonia, Haiti, Ireland, Japan, and South Africa each made their debut in the event. The United States appeared for the seventh time, having competed at each edition of the Olympic men's high jump to that point.

== Competition format ==
The competition used the two-round format introduced in 1912. There were two distinct rounds of jumping with results cleared between rounds. All jumpers clearing 1.83 metres in the qualifying round advanced to the final. There were jump-offs in the final to resolve ties through sixth place.

== Records ==
These were the standing world and Olympic records (in metres) prior to the 1924 Summer Olympics.

World record	Harold Osborn (USA)	2.03	Urbana, United States	27 May 1924
Olympic record	Richmond Landon (USA)	1.936	Antwerp, Belgium	17 August 1920

At first Harold Osborn set a new Olympic record with 1.95 metres. This height was equaled by Leroy Brown, but finally Harold Osborn again improved the Olympic record with 1.98 metres.

== Schedule ==
Date	Time	Round
Sunday, 6 July 1924	14:00	Qualifying
Monday, 7 July 1924	15:00	Final

== Results ==
=== Qualifying ===
The qualification was held on Sunday, July 6, 1924. Jumpers had to pass 1.83 metres to qualify for the final. Nine high jumpers were able to clear this height and qualified for the final. Five competitors were not able to clear any height.

Rank	Athlete	Nation	Height	Notes
1	Leroy Brown	United States	1.83	Q
1	Jenő Gáspár	Hungary	1.83	Q
1	Pierre Guilloux	France	1.83	Q
1	Sverre Helgesen	Norway	1.83	Q
1	Helge Jansson	Sweden	1.83	Q
1	Pierre Lewden	France	1.83	Q
1	Harold Osborn	United States	1.83	Q
1	Tom Poor	United States	1.83	Q
1	Lawrence Roberts	South Africa	1.83	Q
10	Édouard Barbazan	France	1.80	
10	Jean Hénault	Belgium	1.80	
10	Mikio Oda	Japan	1.80	
10	Ivar Sahlin	Sweden	1.80	
10	Larry Stanley	Ireland	1.80	
15	Silvio Cator	Haiti	1.75	
15	Robert Dickinson	Great Britain	1.75	
15	Valter Ever	Estonia	1.75	
15	Josef Machaň	Czechoslovakia	1.75	
19	Antonios Karyofyllis	Greece	1.70	
19	Bror Kraemer	Finland	1.70	
19	Giuseppe Palmieri	Italy	1.70	
22	Jack Miller	Canada	1.65	
—	Édouard Dupiré	France	No mark	
—	Robert Juday	United States	No mark	
—	Crawford Kerr	Great Britain	No mark	
—	Mikuláš Kucsera	Czechoslovakia	No mark	
—	Arthur Willis	Great Britain	No mark	

=== Final ===
The final was held on Monday, July 7, 1924. The ties for 4th/5th and for 6th/7th were broken by jump-offs. Osborn attempted 2.02 metres (which would have been a world record) but was unsuccessful; he hit the bar with his hand on the second attempt.

Rank	Athlete	Nation	Height	Notes
1st place, gold medalist(s)	Harold Osborn	United States	1.98	OR
2nd place, silver medalist(s)	Leroy Brown	United States	1.95	
3rd place, bronze medalist(s)	Pierre Lewden	France	1.92	
4	Tom Poor	United States	1.88	
5	Jenő Gáspár	Hungary	1.88	
6	Helge Jansson	Sweden	1.85	
7	Pierre Guilloux	France	1.85	
8	Lawrence Roberts	South Africa	1.83	
8	Sverre Helgesen	Norway	1.83	
