= Jenő Gáspár =

Hungarian high jumper

Jenő Gáspár (19 June 1896 – 2 January 1945) was a Hungarian track and field athlete who competed in the 1924 Summer Olympics. In 1924 he finished fifth in the high jump competition. He was killed in action in the Battle of Budapest during World War II.
