= Robert Dickinson (athlete) =

British high jumper

Personal information
- Nationality: British
- Born: 20 May 1901 Corbridge, England
- Died: 5 March 1981 (aged 79) Stocksfield, England

Sport
- Sport: Athletics
- Event: High jump
- Club: University of Oxford AC; Achilles Club

Robert Joicey Dickinson (20 May 1901 – 5 March 1981) was a British athlete, who competed at the 1924 Summer Olympics.

== Career ==
Dickinson attended Harrow School and in 1920, won the London Athletic Club Schools' Meeting. While studying at Oriel College, Oxford he won the Oxford versus Cambridge varsity match in 1923 and 1924.

Dickinson finished third behind Frenchman Pierre Lewden in the high jump event at the 1923 AAA Championships.

At the 1924 Olympic Games, Dickinson competed in the men's high jump.

After University he became a solicitor. He was appointed a Governor of Harrow School in 1948.
