= 1923 AAA Championships =

Outdoor track and field competition

- Dates: 6–7 July 1923
- Host city: London, England
- Venue: Stamford Bridge
- Level: Senior
- Type: Outdoor
- Events: 21

The 1923 AAA Championships was the 1923 edition of the annual outdoor track and field competition organised by the Amateur Athletic Association (AAA). It was held from 6 to 7 July 1923 at Stamford Bridge in London, England.

The Championships consisted of 21 events and covered two days of competition.

The year of 1923 also saw the inaugural running of the WAAA Championships in Bromley, although several events had been competed for in 1922.

== Results ==
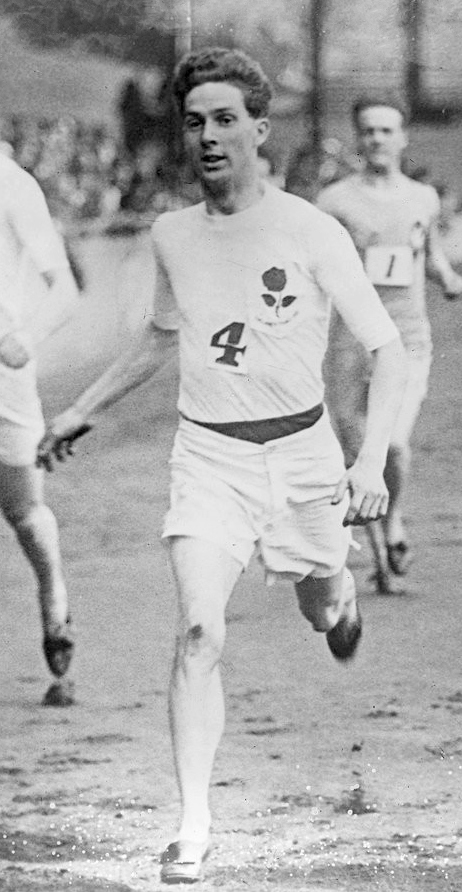
Welshman Cecil Griffiths finally won an AAA title

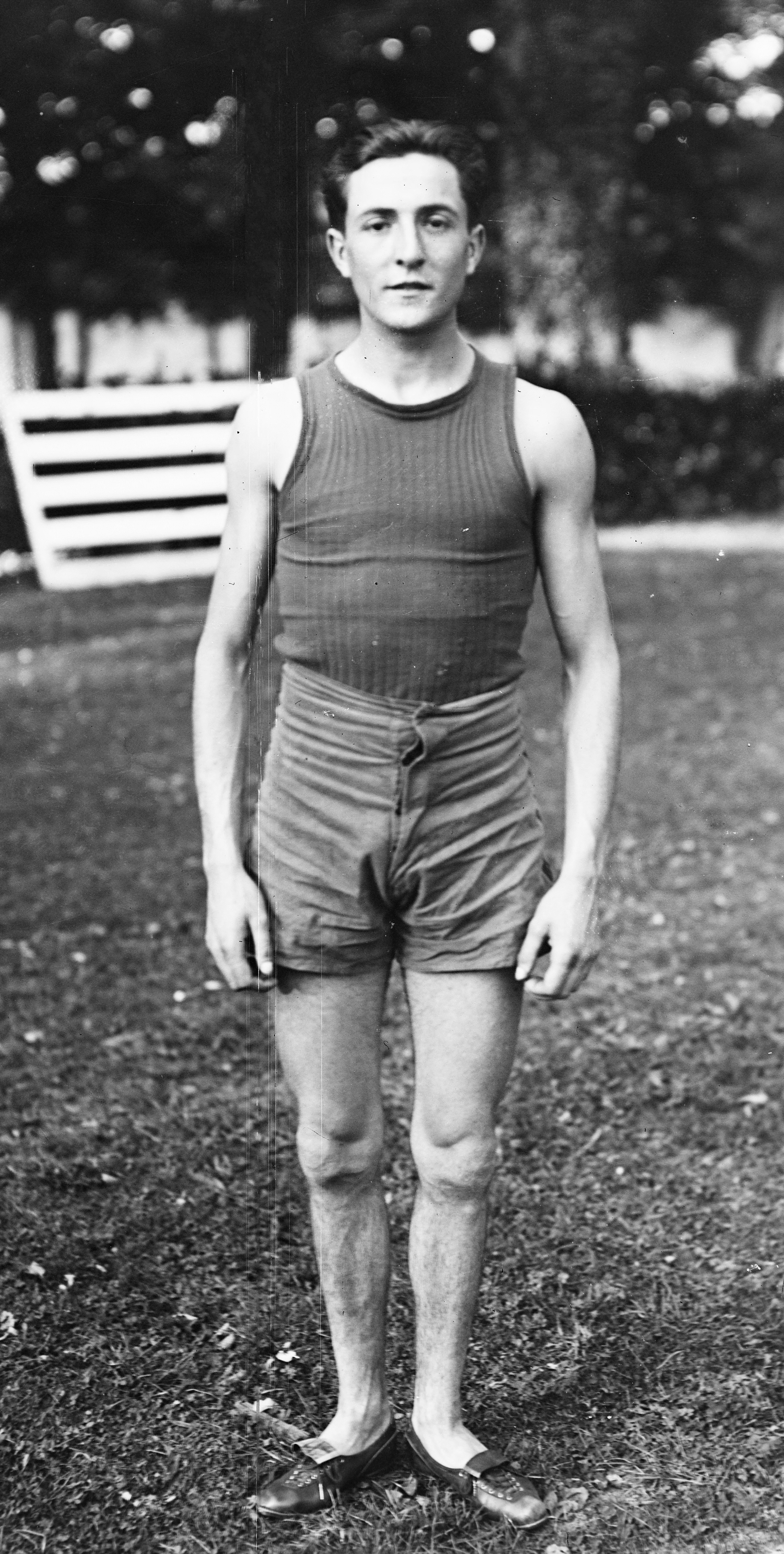
Frenchman Pierre Lewden won both the high jump and pole jump events

Event	Gold		Silver		Bronze	
100 yards	(Scotland) Eric Liddell	9.7 NR	Wilfred Nichol	2 ft	Thomas Matthewman	1 ft
220 yards	(Scotland) Eric Liddell	21.6	Thomas Matthewman	2 yd	Wilfred Nichol	1½ yd
440 yards	(United States) William Stevenson	49.6	Guy Butler	2 ft	John Gillis	inches
880 yards	(Wales) Cecil Griffiths	1:56.6	Edgar Mountain	4 yd	Sonny Spencer	5 yd
1 mile	Henry Stallard	4:21.6	Maurice Pugh	4:23.2	Herbert Johnston	3 yd
4 miles	Joe Blewitt	19:56.6	(France) Lucien Duquesne	19:56.8	George Webber	20:03.0
10 miles	Ernie Harper	53:34.6	C. W. Vincent	55:13.2	(Canada) Vincent Callard	55:18.6
steeplechase	Percy Hodge	11:13.6	Halland Britton	11:18.0	J. Kelley	40 yd
120y hurdles	Frederick Gaby	15.2 =NR	Leopold Partridge	inches	(United States) Trevis Huhn	6 yd
440y hurdles	L. H. Phillips	58.0	William Boardman	2 ft	Frederick Browning	5 yd
2 miles walk	Gordon Watts	14:24.0	Reg Goodwin	14:31.2	Fred Poynton	14:51.0
7 miles walk	Gordon Watts	54:35.4	Reg Goodwin	55:19.2	Harold King	55:46.6
high jump	(France) Pierre Lewden	1.930	Jack Probert	1.778	Arthur Willis; Robert Dickinson	1.727; 1.727
pole jump	(France) Pierre Lewden	walkover	n/a		only 1 competitor	
long jump	Harold Abrahams	7.23	W. H. Childs	6.79	Guy Brockington	6.68
triple jump	John Odde	14.13 (NR)	David Slack	13.33	Charles Lively	13.31
shot put	(Republic of Ireland) John Barrett	11.95	William Bradford	11.43	G. W. Laidlaw	11.39
discus throw	George Mitchell	33.60	Walter Henderson	33.46	Charles Best	32.78
hammer throw	Malcolm Nokes	49.18	(Scotland) John Jackson	37.79	Alexander Murray	32.25
javelin throw	(Scotland) James Dalrymple	45.34	(Seychelles) Henri Dauban	44.36	G. Hagberg	42.62
1 mile relay	Surrey AC	3m 36.4-5s	Birchfield Harriers	3 yd	Blackheath Harriers	7 yd

== See also ==
- 1923 WAAA Championships
