= Ascham St Vincent's School =

Coordinates: 50.762°N 0.278°E

- Eastbourne, Sussex; England

Information
- Type: Preparatory School (UK); Boarding school
- Established: 1889
- Founder: W N Willis
- Closed: 1938
- Gender: M
- Age: 4 to 14

Ascham St Vincent's School was a preparatory school for boys at Eastbourne, East Sussex, England. Like other preparatory schools, its purpose was to train pupils to do well enough in the examinations (usually taken around the age of 13) to gain admission to leading "public schools" (as private secondary schools are known in England).

== History ==
The school was founded by the Rev William Newcombe Willis in 1889 with one pupil. Willis, a graduate of St John's College, Cambridge, was appointed curate at the parish church at Meads in Eastbourne. A year later he married Sophia Caroline Baker and he and his wife decided to use their house in Selwyn Road as a small school called Ascham. He named the school after Roger Ascham, a fellow of St. John's College, Cambridge and tutor to Lady Jane Grey in the reign of Queen Elizabeth I. Between 1891 and 1905 they had seven children at a time but in 1908 the numbers had increased. In that year they joined with St Vincent's School in Carlisle Road and became known as Ascham St Vincent's. Later, larger premises were acquired in St. Anne's Road. Willis was extremely well supported by his wife and at certain times by some of their 7 children.

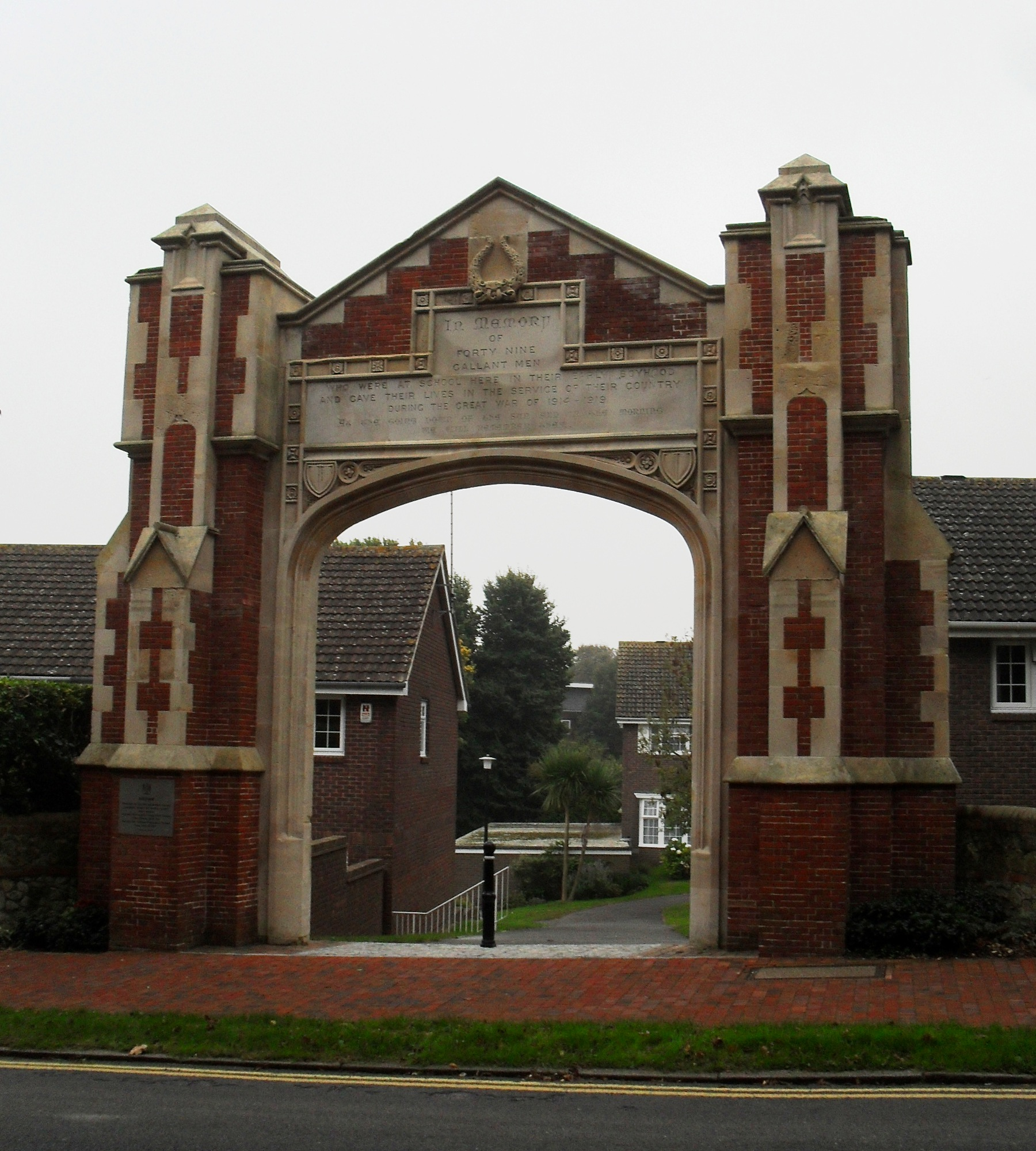
The Ascham St Vincent War Memorial Arch

Ascham was very successful in preparing boys for public schools and obtaining scholarships. Willis played for Eastbourne Football Club from 1889 to 1904, part of that time as captain, and was very keen on sport for the school, including shooting. Willis retired in 1927 after 38 years as headmaster and his son Arthur took over.

Arthur Willis had joined the Royal Navy the day before World War I and after the war joined Royal Tank Corps. He was the army high jump champion and represented his country at high jump in the 1924 Olympic games. He completed his MA degree at Cambridge and took over the school in 1927. Ascham St. Vincent's prospered, with leavers spassing entrance exams to public schools of their choice and winning scholarships to Eton, Malvern and Eastbourne colleges. In 1938 Willis was worried about the threatening situation in Europe. He returned to the Royal Tank Corps and closed and sold the school.

Eastbourne College bought the land and buildings of Ascham St. Vincent's and used it from 1939 for Crosby House, a boarding house of the college. On 20 June 1940 the college moved out of Eastbourne to Radley and the Royal Navy (H.M.S. Marlborough) took over all the college buildings. In Autumn 1945 the college returned to Eastbourne and the Ascham St. Vincent's site was re-opened as the college prep school "Ascham" in May 1946. In 1977 the site was sold for property development and a merger with St. Andrews took place.

The school is commemorated by the Ascham Memorial Arch in Carlisle Road, Meads.

== Former pupils ==
- A. J. Ayer (1910–1989), philosopher
- Adm. Sir Angus Edward Malise Bontine Cunninghame Graham (1893–1981), Flag Officer Scotland, Lord Lieutenant Dunbartonshire & Keeper of Dumbarton Castle
- Terence Gray (1895–1986), known as Wei Wu Wei, Taoist philosopher
- Stephen Robert Nockolds (1909–1990) geochemist and petrologist
- Michael Fish (1944 to date), meteorologist
- Vernon Dobtcheff (1934 to date), actor
- Robert B. Pynsent, Czech and Slovak Literature Professor, University of London
