= Tom Poor =

American high jumper (1903–1965)

Tom Woodson Poor (December 15, 1903 – December 20, 1965) was an American track and field athlete who competed in the 1924 Summer Olympics. He was born in Bismarck, Missouri, and died in Grove, Oklahoma.

He won the 1923 NCAA Championship in the high jump with a jump of 6 feet, 1 inch, while competing for University of Kansas. In 1924 he finished fourth in the high jump competition.

Poor later became the mayor of Olathe, Kansas. He died in 1965 due to a heart attack.

== See also ==
- List of mayors of Olathe, Kansas
