= Lawrence Roberts (athlete) =

South African high jumper

Personal information
- Born: 1 July 1903
- Died: 8 March 1977 (aged 73)

Sport
- Sport: Athletics
- Event: high jump
- Club: University of Cambridge AC; Achilles Club

Lawrence Frederick Roberts also known as Bob Roberts (1 July 1903 – 8 March 1977) was a South African track and field athlete who competed in the 1924 Summer Olympics.

== Career ==
Roberts studied at St John's College, Cambridge.

Roberts finished third behind Larry Stanley in the high jump event at the 1924 AAA Championships.

Shortly afterwards he was selected for the South African team at the 1924 Olympic Games in Paris, where he finished eighth in the 1924 high jump event.
