= Vincent Callard =

Canadian long-distance runner

Personal information
- Nationality: British/Canadian
- Born: 22 November 1895 Hampstead, England
- Died: 18 July 1976 (aged 80) Colchester, England

Sport
- Sport: Long-distance running
- Event: 5000 metres
- Club: Monarch AC, Toronto

Vincent Stuart Callard (22 November 1895 – 18 July 1976) was a British/Canadian long-distance runner, who competed at the 1928 Summer Olympics.

== Career ==
Callard finished third behind Ernie Harper in the 10 miles event at the British 1923 AAA Championships.

At the 1928 Olympic Games, Callard competed for Canada in the men's 5000 metres.
