= Hospital in the Rock =

Museum in Budapest, Hungary

Coordinates: 47.500992°N 19.031476°E

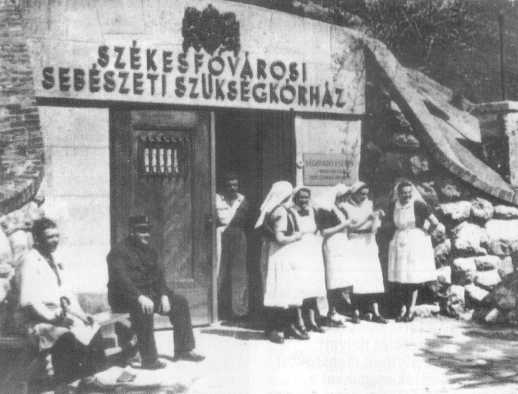
Hospital entrance during Siege of Budapest

The Hospital in the Rock Nuclear Bunker Museum (Hungarian: Sziklakórház Atombunker Múzeum) is the name given to a hospital created in the caverns under Buda Castle in Budapest in the 1930s, in preparation for the Second World War.

== Construction ==
Károly Szendy, the mayor of the Hungarian capital, ordered the construction of an emergency hospital and reinforced bomb shelter under Buda Castle.

Construction began in 1939 and the emergency surgical centre was completed in 1944. Its primary role was to provide general emergency care for injured civilians, later on they treated soldiers as well. Anybody could get treatment there, regardless of their gender, race, religion or ethnicity. The chief nurse of the Hungarian Red Cross, Countess Edelsheim-Gyulai Ilona, was there at the time of the opening and worked in the hospital as a nurse. The hospital was staffed by approximately 40 doctors, nurses, and assistants together.

The hospital tunnel system was connected to an existing tunnel network by manual labor. The original system had been in use by various inhabitants of the castle for many years, and was said to have been part of a penal system in centuries past.

== 1944-45 Siege of Budapest ==
During the Siege of Budapest, the hospital handled the wounded and dead. Bodies were sent out of the hospital at night and buried in bomb craters. The hospital was without food or medicine at some points during the siege, with staff having to recycle supplies by taking them from corpses and sterilizing them before reuse. Eventually, horses were brought in and killed for food. The hospital was designed to treat 60–70 patients, but at one point was being used to treat 600 wounded soldiers.

Both civilians and soldiers were treated in the hospital with a separate ward for women.

German soldiers were also treated in the hospital but they mostly stayed in their own part of the cave system. Swabian Hungarian soldiers who were forcibly conscripted and got into the Waffen-SS groups were also treated in the hospital. The facility had its own generators, so they could X-ray patients even during the siege of Budapest, when it was impossible in other hospitals. The hospital was one of the most advanced of its time with state of the art surgical equipment.

Doctors treated thousands of civilians and soldiers. On the day of the break-out, able patients left the hospital. Those who were unable to evacuate themselves were transported home or to overground hospitals.

== 1946-1957 ==
After the siege, the hospital was only used once more, in 1956, in response to the uprising against the Soviet rule. After that, the hospital functioned as a prison for a short period before being re-purposed as a nuclear bunker, but one dedicated to keeping 200 doctors and nurses safe and available to treat the wounded. Nobody ever took up residence in the bunker, except for a caretaker and his wife. Because of this, the hospital museum now has a collection of anti-radiation kits, as well as some Soviet spying equipment, on display.

== 1958-1962 ==
Between 1958 and 1962, the hospital equipment was upgraded to take account of the risk of a chemical or nuclear attack. A 25 m^{3} (25,000,000 cubic centimetres) water tank, a ventilation and poison gas-filtering system were installed. Two Ganz diesel engines were also built to power electrical generators. Engineers such as István Bakonyi contributed to the planning and supervision.

== 1962-2007 ==
The hospital became part of the civil defense infrastructure and was classified as "Top Secret". Only members of John's Hospital – doctors and nurses – were assigned as staff to survive a nuclear strike. People inside the hospital could probably have survived for 72 hours after a chemical or nuclear attack. Then, according to the plan, there should have been three week partial period quarantine. The hospital was equipped with ventilation fans equipped with poison gas filters. The facility became obsolete at the end of the 1960s because of the fast development of technology.

The Szabó Family were replaced by the Mohácsi family in 1967. They lived in a lodging in the foreground and maintained the hospital until 2004. Mr. Mohácsi was a mechanic: he checked the equipment daily and aired the place. Mrs. Mohácsi did the cleaning every second week of 2,400 square meters and made 200 beds. Nobody ventured to close the hospital so the maintenance of the civil defense places was handled secretly during the rule of the Hungarian Communist Party. The costs were hidden in the budget of the John's Hospital. The members of the John's Hospital came here for yearly practice until the middle of 1980s while maintaining secrecy.

The facility was occasionally used by the Krétakör Theatre between 2004 and 2006. On the European Heritage Days in 2006, the hospital could be visited. Modernization and restoration started in 2007 and it was opened as a museum in the same year.

== Present day ==
In recent times, the hospital has been made into a museum, complete with waxwork recreations of hospital treatments and day-to-day scenarios during the siege. Access to the museum is limited to guided tours. Old equipment that was left over from its operational days is available for sale, including stretchers, gas masks and civil protection uniforms.
