= Crawford Kerr =

British high jumper

Personal information
- Nationality: British
- Born: 15 January 1902 Lochranza, Isle of Arran, Scotland
- Died: 26 October 1950 (aged 48) Lincoln, England

Sport
- Sport: Athletics
- Event: High jump
- Club: University of Glasgow

Gilbert John Crawford Kerr (15 January 1902 – 26 October 1950) was a British athlete, who competed at the 1924 Summer Olympics.

== Career ==
Kerr finished third behind Larry Stanley in the high jump event at the 1924 AAA Championships. Shortly afterwards he was selected for the British team at the 1924 Olympic Games in Paris but was eliminated in qualifying during the men's high jump event.
