= Leroy Brown (high jumper) =

American high jumper

Olympic medal record

Men's athletics

Representing the United States
Silver medal – second place	1924 Paris	High jump

Leroy Taylor Brown (January 1, 1902, in New York City – April 21, 1970) was an American athlete who competed mainly in the high jump. He competed for the United States in the 1924 Summer Olympics held in Paris, France in the high jump where he won the silver medal.

== Sources ==
- Evans, Hilary; Gjerde, Arild; Heijmans, Jeroen; Mallon, Bill; et al. "Leroy Brown". Olympics at Sports-Reference.com. Sports Reference LLC. Archived from the original on April 17, 2020.
