= Édouard Barbazan =

French high jumper

Personal information
- Nationality: French
- Born: 12 November 1902
- Died: 25 December 1986 (aged 84)

Sport
- Sport: Athletics
- Event: High jump

Édouard Barbazan (12 November 1902 – 25 December 1986) was a French athlete. He competed in the men's high jump at the 1924 Summer Olympics.
