= Sverre Helgesen =

Norwegian high jumper and journalist (1903–1981)

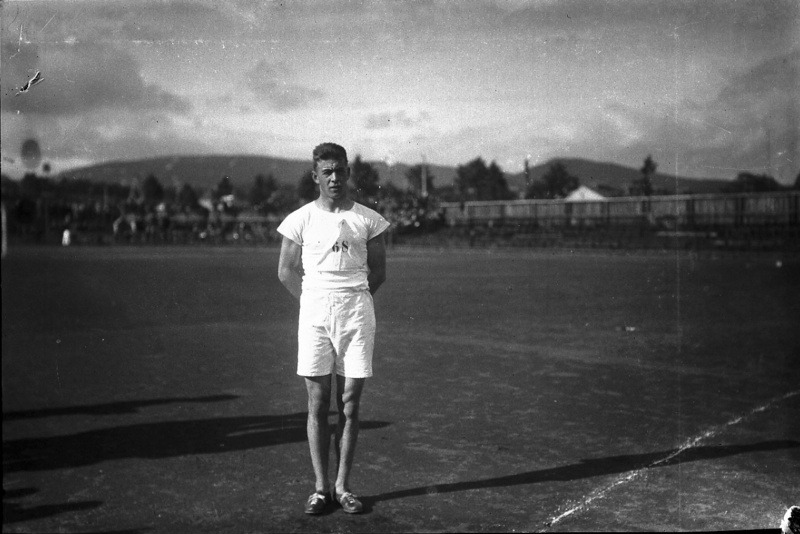
- Helgesen in 1924

Personal information
- Nationality: Norwegian
- Born: 26 May 1903 Bodø, Nordland, Norway
- Died: 4 November 1981 (aged 78) Oslo, Norway
- Height: 183 cm (6 ft 0 in)
- Weight: 75 kg (165 lb)

Sport
- Sport: Athletics
- Event: high jump/triple jump
- Club: IK Tjalve, Oslo

Sverre Helgesen (26 May 1903 – 4 November 1981) was a Norwegian high jumper, sports official and journalist.

== Biography ==
Helgesen was born in Bodø. He represented the sports club Bodø og Omegns IF, then IK Tjalve after moving to Oslo. When Norwegian athletics was split in a bourgeois camp and a Workers' Confederation of Sports, Helgesen eventually chose to move to the workers' club IF Rollo.

His personal best jump was 1.91 metres (6 ft 3 in), achieved in September 1925 in Moss. This was a Norwegian record at the time. At the 1924 Summer Olympics he finished eighth in the high jump final with a jump of 1.83 metres (6 ft 0 in). He became Norwegian champion in 1926 with a tied championship record of 1.90 metres (6 ft 3 in). He also won national silver medals in 1924 and 1925. In the standing high jump he won a bronze medal in 1923, silver in 1928 and gold in 1924, 1925, 1926 and 1927. After joining the workers' movement he won the high jump at the 1928 Spartakiad.

Helgesen finished second behind Jack Higginson in the triple jump event at the British 1926 AAA Championships.

Besides active sports he was sports editor of Arbeiderbladet from 1928 to 1973. He was a board member of the Norwegian Athletics Association from 1945 through 1948. He was also a jury member for awarding the Egebergs Ærespris.
