= List of mayors of Olathe, Kansas =

Olathe, Kansas mayors

The following is a list of mayors of the city of Olathe, Kansas, United States of America.

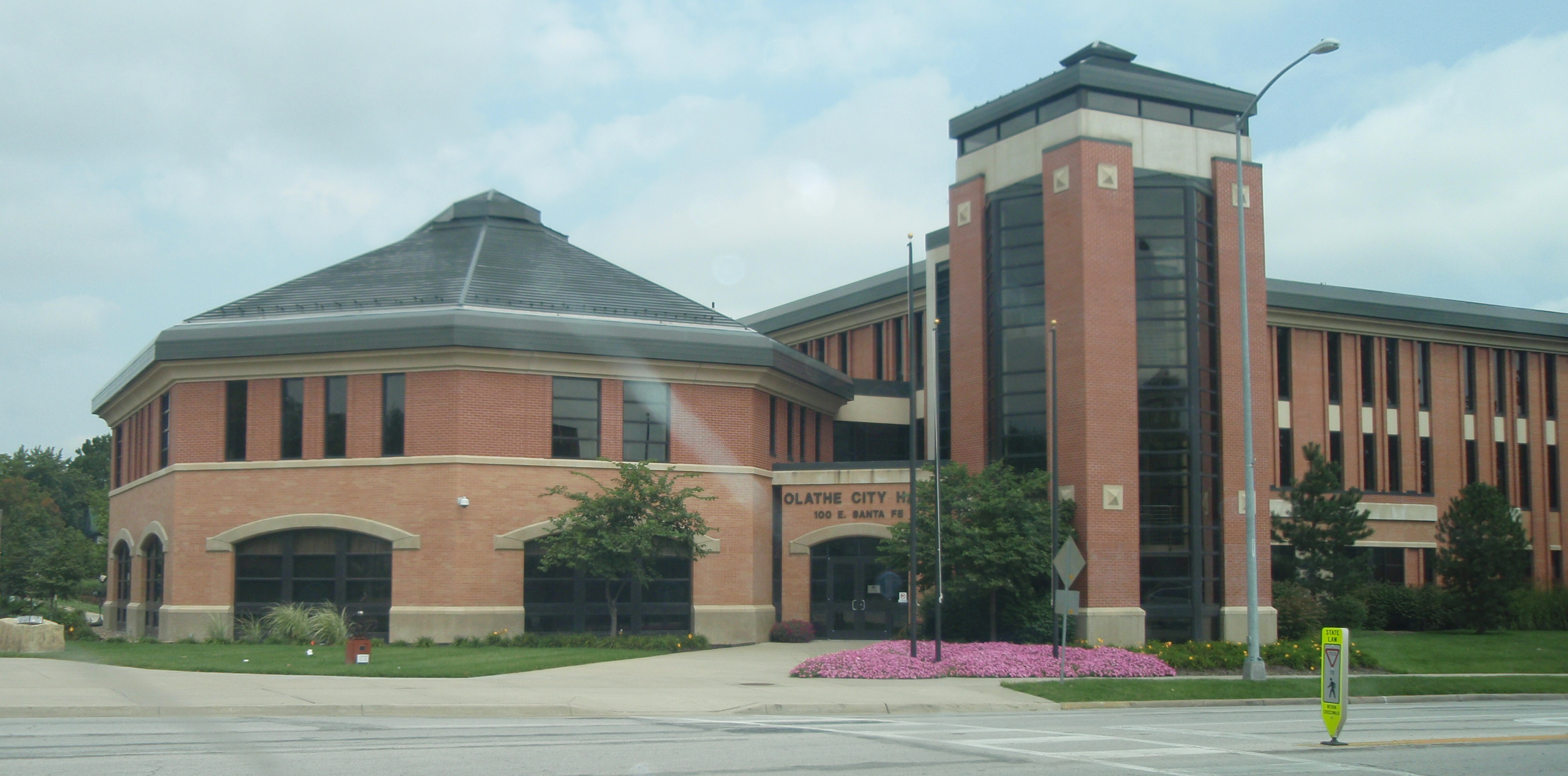
Olathe City Hall building in Kansas, 2009

- John T. Barton, c.1860
- S.F. Hill, c.1860
- William Pellett, c.1870
- Fishback, c.1871-1874
- Isaac O. Pickering, 1878-1885
- ? John B. Bruner
- ? F.R. Lanter
- Frank Hodges, c.1899
- George H. Hodges, c.1900
- A.E. Moll, c.1902
- John T. Little, c.1903-1904
- John J. Glover, c.1905
- F.R. Ogg, c.1906-1907
- Frank F. Greene, 1909-1911
- Charles W. Gorsuch, c.1911
- James S. Pellett, 1913-1918
- Will Duffy, c.1922
- Don Ashlock Sr., 1934-1940
- ? Claude King
- Tom Poor, c.1949-1952
- Lloyd H. Squires, c.1953-1954
- Hal K. Robinson, c.1955-1956
- Peter A. Martin, 1968-1970
- Robert Manning, c.1971
- Doug Knop, 1984
- Lois Taylor Roath, 1985-1986
- Larry L. Campbell, c.1997-2001
- Michael E. Copeland, 2001-2020
- John Bacon, 2020–present

== See also ==
- Olathe history
