= Leopold Partridge =

British hurdler

Personal information
- Nationality: British
- Born: 14 July 1901 Potters Bar, England
- Died: 18 June 1976 (aged 74) Dublin, Ireland

Sport
- Sport: Athletics
- Event: 110 metres hurdles
- Club: Achilles Club

Leopold Frank Partridge (14 July 1901 – 18 June 1976) was a British athlete who competed at the 1924 Summer Olympics.

== Career ==
Partridge attended St Catharine's College, Cambridge, where he won a football Blue (1920–21) and was capped for England in the amateur international against France in 1921. He finished in second place at the Oxford versus Cambridge varsity athletics match in 1921. The following year he won the event and finished second behind Frederick Gaby in the 120 yards hurdles event at the 1922 AAA Championships.

He won the Southern Counties title in 1923 before finishing second again behind Fred Gaby at the 1923 AAA Championships and third in the 1924 AAA Championships (again behind Gaby).

Partridge left Cambridge without taking a degree and went into business with his father, who was an antiques dealer with premises in Bond Street and New York. He died in the Republic of Ireland in 1976.
