= Stephen Robert Nockolds =

English geochemist (1909-1990)

FRS Stephen Robert Nockolds
- Born: 10 May 1909; St Columb Major, Cornwall
- Died: 7 February 1990 (aged 80)
- Citizenship: United Kingdom
- Education: Trinity College, Cambridge (PhD)
- Alma mater: Manchester University
- Spouses: Hilda Jackson (m. 1932–1976) Patricia Horsely (m. 1976)
- Scientific career
- Fields: Geochemistry, Geology, Petrology
- Workplaces: Trinity College, Cambridge

Stephen Robert Nockolds, FRS (10 May 1909 – 7 February 1990) was a geochemist, petrologist and winner of the Murchison Medal of the Geological Society of London.

== Early life and education ==
Robert Nockolds was born at St Columb Major, Cornwall, the son of Dr Stephen Nockolds, a surgeon of Brighton, and his wife Hilda Tomlinson. He was educated at Ascham St Vincent's School, Eastbourne and at Felsted School where his interest in rocks already manifested itself. He then went to Manchester University and then took a PhD at Trinity College, Cambridge.

== Career ==
He became a Fellow of Trinity College, and lectured in petrology at Cambridge. In 1957 he became Reader in Geochemistry at Cambridge, and Emeritus Reader. In 1959 he became a Fellow of the Royal Society, and was also an Honorary Fellow of the Geological Society of India.

In 1972 he retired from Cambridge and was awarded the Murchison Medal of the Geological Society. He published a leading work on petrology and a large number of papers in various journals as shown below.

== Personal life ==
In 1932 he married Hilda Jackson (1909–1976) and subsequently after she died in 1976 he married Patricia Horsley (1923 – 10 July 2013). He was known to his friends as Nocky or Bob and whilst he didn't have children of his own he was affectionately embraced by Patricia's large family.

== Works ==
- Nockolds, S. R. Petrology for Students (1978) ISBN 9780521291842
- Nockolds, S. R. 1933 Some theoretical aspects of Contamination in Acid Magmas. Journ. Geol. xii, p. 563.
- Nockolds, S. R. 1934. The production of normal Rock Types by Contamination and their bearing on Petrogenesis. Geol. Mag. lxxi, p. 31.
- Nockolds, S. R. 1934. The contaminated tonalites of Loch Awe, Argyll. Q.J.G.S. xc, p. 302.
- Nockolds, S. R. 1935. Contributions to the Petrology of Barnavave, Carlingford, I.F.S. 1, The Junction Hybrids. Geol. Mag. lxxii, p. 289.
- Nockolds, S. R. 1940, Petrology of rocks from Queen Mary Land. Australasian Antarctic Exped. 1911–14. Sci. Repts. ser. A, 4, Geol. pt. 2, 15–86.
- Nockolds, S. R. 1941. The Garabal Hill-Glen Fyne igneous complex. Q. J. geol. Soc. Lond., 96, 451–511.
- Nockolds, S. R. & Mitchell, R. L. 1946. The geochemistry of some Caledonian plutonic rocks: a study in the relationship between the major and trace elements of igneous rocks and their minerals. Trans. R. Soc. Edinb., 61, 533–575.
- Tilley C E & Nockolds S R [Edited by] Part II Proceedings of Section a : Problems of Geochemistry UK 1950. Paper Covers. International Geological Congress. Report of the Eighteenth Session Great Britain 1948.
- Nockolds, S. R. & Allen, R. 1953. The geochemistry of some igneous rock series. Geochim & Cosmochim Acta, 4, 105–42.
- Nockolds, S. R. & Allen, R. 1954. The geochemistry of some igneous rock series ––II. Geochim & Cosmochim Acta, 5, 245–85.
- Nockolds, S. R. & Allen, R. 1956. The geochemistry of some igneous rock series––III. Geochim & Cosmochim Acta, 9, 34–77.
- Hutton, C. O. & Nockolds, S. R. 1978. The petrology of Nevis, Leeward Islands, West Indies. Institute of Geological Sciences, Overseas Geology and Mineral Resources 52:1–31.
