= Krisztián Ungváry =

Hungarian historian

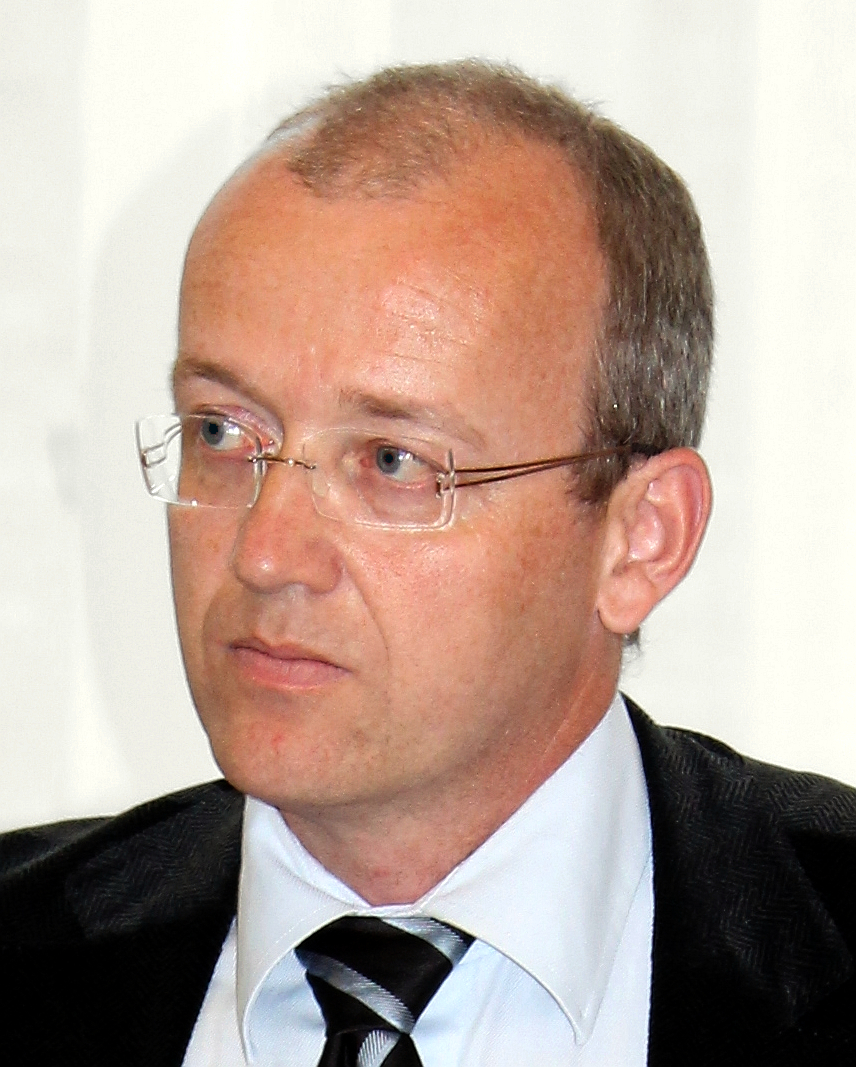
Ungváry in 2014

Krisztián Ungváry (born 1969) is a Hungarian historian of 20th century political and military history. He wrote about the siege of Budapest in World War II.

== Early life and education ==
Ungváry is the son of Rudolf Ungváry, a high-ranking employee of the Országos Széchényi Könyvtár, and journalist Éva Monspart. He concluded his high school studies in the II. Rákoczi Ferenc Gimnázium in Budapest between 1984 and 1988. In 1989 he continued his studies on the Eötvös Loránd Tudományegyetem university, specializing in German and History. During his studies, he was a holder of several scholarships, including that of the Republican Scholarship of Hungary. In 1993 he studied in Germany, and finally graduated in 1995.

== Other interests ==
On 15 October 1988, he was among the founding members of the Hungarian Boy Scout Association. His area of interests include 20th century political and military history. He is an owner of a private vineyard and produces wine.

== Publications ==
- Budapest ostroma. Corvina kiadó, Budapest, 1998. 330.o. (1. kiadás 1998. január, 2. kiadás 1998 május, 3. kiadás 1998 október).
  - Die Belagerung Budapest. Herbig, München, first edition: October 1999, second edition: January 2001.
  - The Siege of Budapest. Tauris, London, (Improved and shortened English edition based on the 3rd Hungarian edition.)
  - The Siege of Budapest. 100 Days in World War II. With a foreword by John Lukács. New York, 2005, Yale University Press
- Budapesti Negyed 29–30. Volume, 2000 autumn-winter. Budapest ostroma. (as editor)
- A magyar honvédség a második világháborúban. Budapest, 2004, Osiris (2. edition: 2005. February)
- Magyarország és a második világháború. [Nemzet és emlékezet series]. Budapest, 2005. Osiris
- Budapest 1945 (with Miklós Tamási). Budapest, 2006 Corvina
- Elhallgatott múlt. A pártállam és a belügy. A politikai rendőrség működése Magyarországon 1956–1990. (Past denied. The party-state and the inner ministry. The work of political police in Hungary 1956–1990. with Gábor Tabajdi) Budapest 2008. Corvina–1956-os Intézet
