= Jack Miller (high jumper) =

Canadian athlete

Personal information
- Born: 26 January 1899 Sussex, New Brunswick, Canada
- Died: 19 March 1957 (aged 58)

Sport
- Sport: Athletics
- Event: High jump

Jack Miller (26 January 1899 – 19 March 1957) was a Canadian athlete. He competed in the men's high jump at the 1924 Summer Olympics.
