= Thomas Matthewman =

British sprinter

Personal information
- Nationality: British
- Born: 10 March 1903 Huddersfield, England
- Died: 14 August 1990 (aged 87) Leeds, England

Sport
- Sport: Sprinting
- Event: 100 yards/220 yards
- Club: Huddersfield AC

Thomas Matthewman (10 March 1903 – 14 August 1990) was a British sprinter, who competed at the 1924 Summer Olympics.

== Career ==
At the 1924 Olympic Games, Matthewman competed in the men's 200 metres.

Matthewman finished second and third respectively behind Eric Liddell in the 220 yards and 100 yards events at the 1923 AAA Championships.
