= Édouard Dupiré =

French high jumper

Personal information
- Nationality: French
- Born: 13 July 1904
- Died: 27 August 1968 (aged 64)

Sport
- Sport: Athletics
- Event: High jump

Édouard Dupiré (13 July 1904 – 27 August 1968) was a French athlete. He competed in the men's high jump at the 1924 Summer Olympics.
