= Siege of Budapest =

1944–1945 World War II battle

- Part of the Budapest Offensive (Eastern Front of World War II)
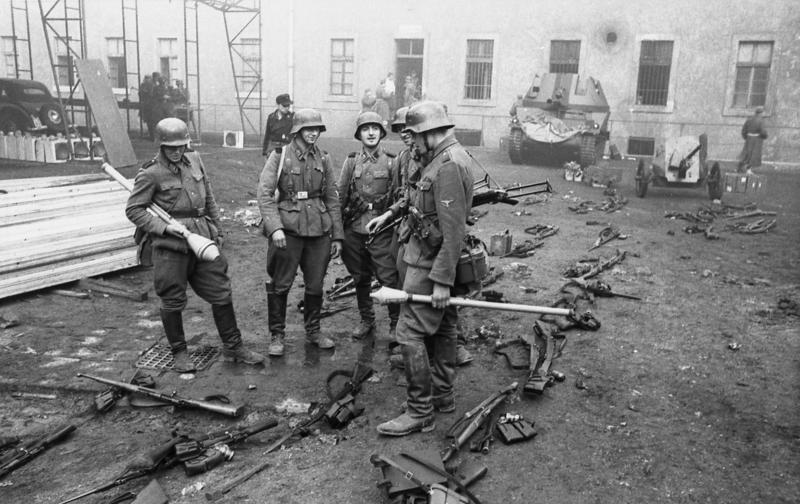
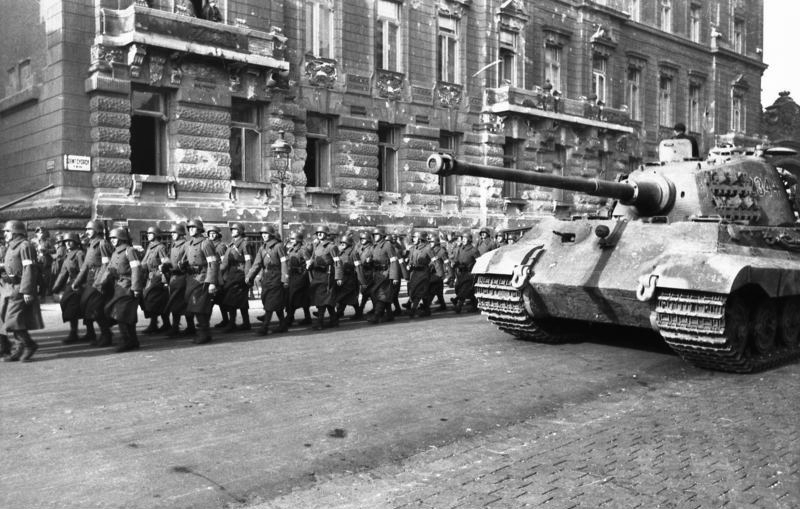
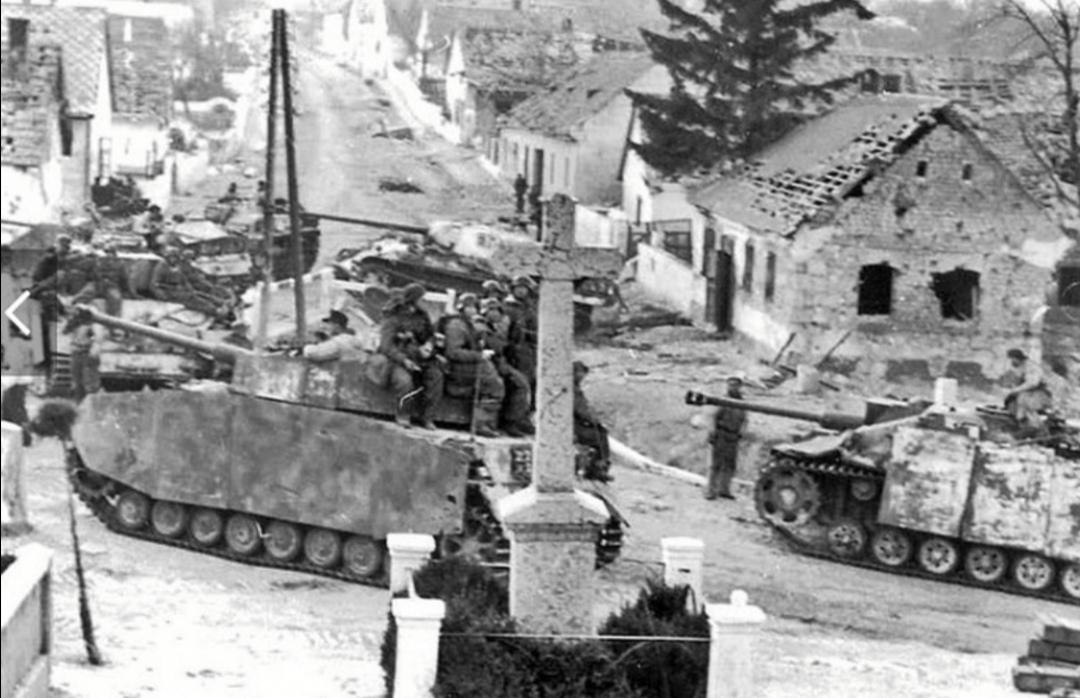
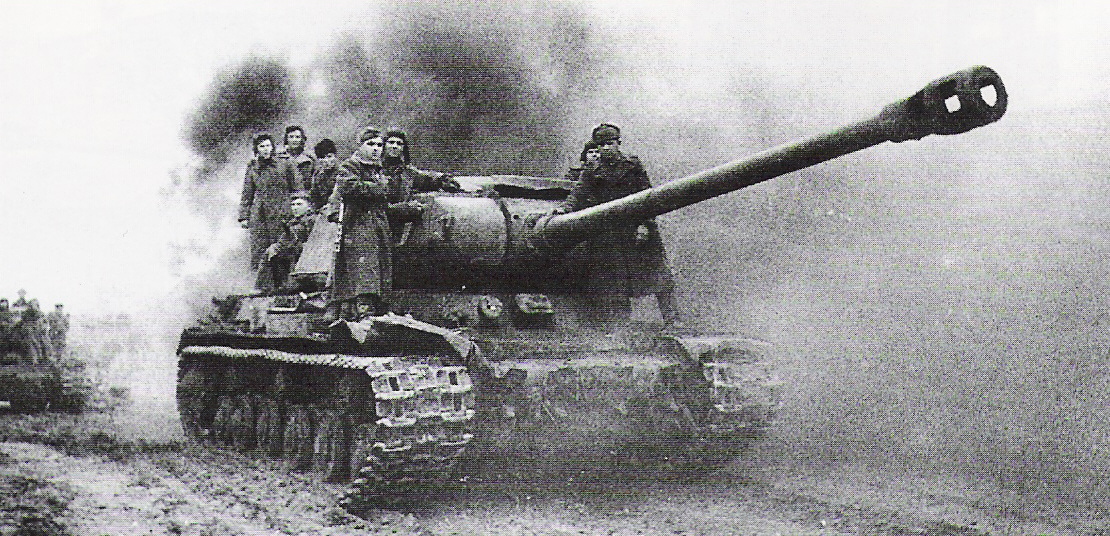
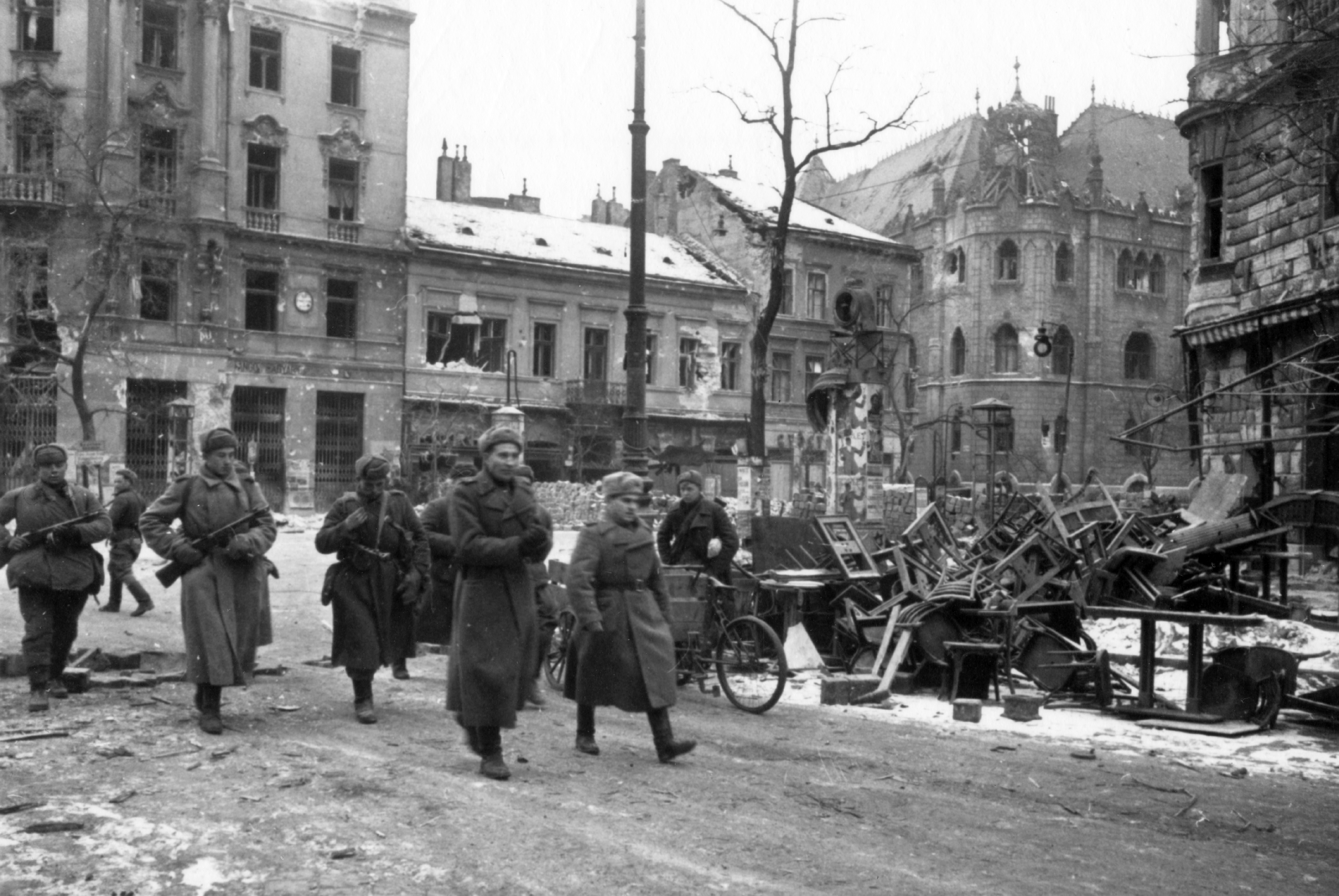
- Clockwise from top-left: German soldiers with captured Hungarian equipment in Budapest during Operation Panzerfaust; Soldiers of the Hungarian Arrow Cross marching next to a Tiger II in front of Buda Castle; Soviet infantry riding on an IS-2 tank during operations at Lake Balaton; Soviet troops in the neighborhood of Ferencváros advancing through a street damaged by heavy fighting; Soldier writing "Budapest" in Russian on a road sign; Tanks of the 3rd SS Panzer Division Totenkopf during Operation Konrad
| Date | 29 October 1944 (Beginning of the Soviet offensive) / 26 December 1944 (Completion of the encirclement of Budapest) – 13 February 1945 (3 months, 2 weeks and 1 day / 1 month, 2 weeks and 6 days) |
| Location | Budapest, Hungary 47°29′54″N 19°2′27″E |
| Result | Soviet victory; Soviet forces capture the city |

Belligerents
| Germany: Hungary (Szálasi government) | Soviet Union; Romania (later recalled); Hungary (Debrecen government) |

Commanders and leaders
| (Nazi Germany) Karl Pfeffer-Wildenbruch (POW) (Nazi Germany) Gerhard Schmidhuber † (Kingdom of Hungary (1920–1946)) Dezső László (Kingdom of Hungary (1920–1946)) Iván Hindy (POW) | (Soviet Union) Rodion Malinovsky (Soviet Union) Fyodor Tolbukhin (Kingdom of Romania) Nicolae Șova (Kingdom of Hungary) Oszkár Variházy |

Strength
| In the city: 79,000 men (Nazi Germany) 41,000 men (ration strength) (Kingdom of Hungary (1920–1946)) 38,000 men (ration strength) 489 guns 125 tanks and assault guns 117 heavy anti-tank guns | In the city: 177,000 men 1,000 guns |

Casualties and losses
| 3 November–15 February: 137,000 men 24 December–15 February: 114,000 men Garrison besieged in Budapest: 79,000 men: (Nazi Germany) 30,000 killed; (Nazi Germany) 11,000 captured; (Kingdom of Hungary (1920–1946)) 9,000 killed; (Kingdom of Hungary (1920–1946)) 29,000 captured; Relief attempts: Unknown | 3 November–11 February, throughout Budapest Offensive: 320,082 At Budapest: ~200 tanks |
- 76,000 civilians dead 38,000 civilians died in the siege (7,000 executed); 38,000 died in labour or POW camps

The Siege of Budapest or Battle of Budapest, was a major battle fought between Soviet and Romanian forces and Hungarian and German forces for the Hungarian capital of Budapest, near the end of World War II. The Budapest Offensive began on October 29 1944, while the siege lasted from December 26 1944 to February 13, 1945. The Soviets began advancing into the suburbs of Pest in November and encircled Budapest on December 26. The besieged defenders resisted the Soviets for approximately fifty days, although they had already exhausted most of their supplies in the first days of the fighting. The civilian population, numbering 800,000, was not evacuated, and consequently many civilians fell victim to the fighting, the intensity of which contemporary observers compared to that of the Battle of Stalingrad. During the siege, about 38,000 civilians died through starvation, military action, and mass executions of Jews in the Budapest Ghetto by the far-right Hungarian nationalist Arrow Cross Party. The city unconditionally surrendered on February 13, 1945. It was a major strategic victory for the Allies in their push towards Berlin.

On 29 December 1944, Soviet envoys delivered an ultimatum demanding the surrender of Axis forces defending Budapest. After the ultimatum was rejected, fighting within the city proper began. The Germans attempted several operations to aid the defenders, who were in an increasingly desperate situation. The most ambitious of these offensives was Operation Konrad III, in which the Germans managed to overrun some Soviet units before being stopped. However, on none of these occasions did they succeed in reaching the city, despite roughly half of the remaining German armored divisions on the Eastern Front being deployed in Hungary. The purpose of these operations was not, in any case, to evacuate the defenders, but to reinforce the city's garrison. Eventually, despite Adolf Hitler's orders, the beleaguered defenders decided to attempt a breakout. The breakout attempt began on the evening of February 11, but only a handful of soldiers managed to reach friendly lines. Shortly afterward, on February 13, the Hungarian capital came completely under Soviet control.

== General situation ==
Having suffered nearly 200,000 deaths in three years fighting the Soviet Union, and with the front lines approaching its own cities, Hungary was by early 1944 ready to exit World War II. As political forces within Hungary pushed for an end to the fighting, Germany preemptively launched Operation Margarethe on 19 March 1944, and entered Hungary.

In October 1944, after successive Allied victories at Normandy and Falaise, and after the collapse of the Eastern Front following the stunning success of the Soviet summer offensive, Operation Bagration, Regent of Hungary Miklós Horthy again attempted to negotiate a separate peace with the Allies. Upon hearing of Horthy's efforts, Hitler launched Operation Panzerfaust to keep Hungary on the Axis side, and forced Horthy to abdicate. Horthy and his government were replaced by the far-right National Socialist Arrow Cross Party, led by "Hungarist" Ferenc Szálasi. As the new ultra-nationalist government and its German allies prepared the defense of the capital, IX SS Mountain Corps, consisting of two Waffen-SS divisions, was sent to Budapest to strengthen the city's defense.

== Soviet offensive ==
The besieging Soviet forces were part of Rodion Malinovsky's 2nd Ukrainian Front. Formations that actually took part in the fighting appear to have included the 53rd Army, 7th Guards Army, portions of the 3rd Ukrainian Front, including the 46th Army, and the Romanian 7th Army Corps.

Arrayed against the Soviets was a collection of German Army (Heer), Waffen-SS, and Hungarian Army forces.

The Siege of Budapest was one of the bloodiest sieges of World War II.

=== Encirclement of Budapest ===
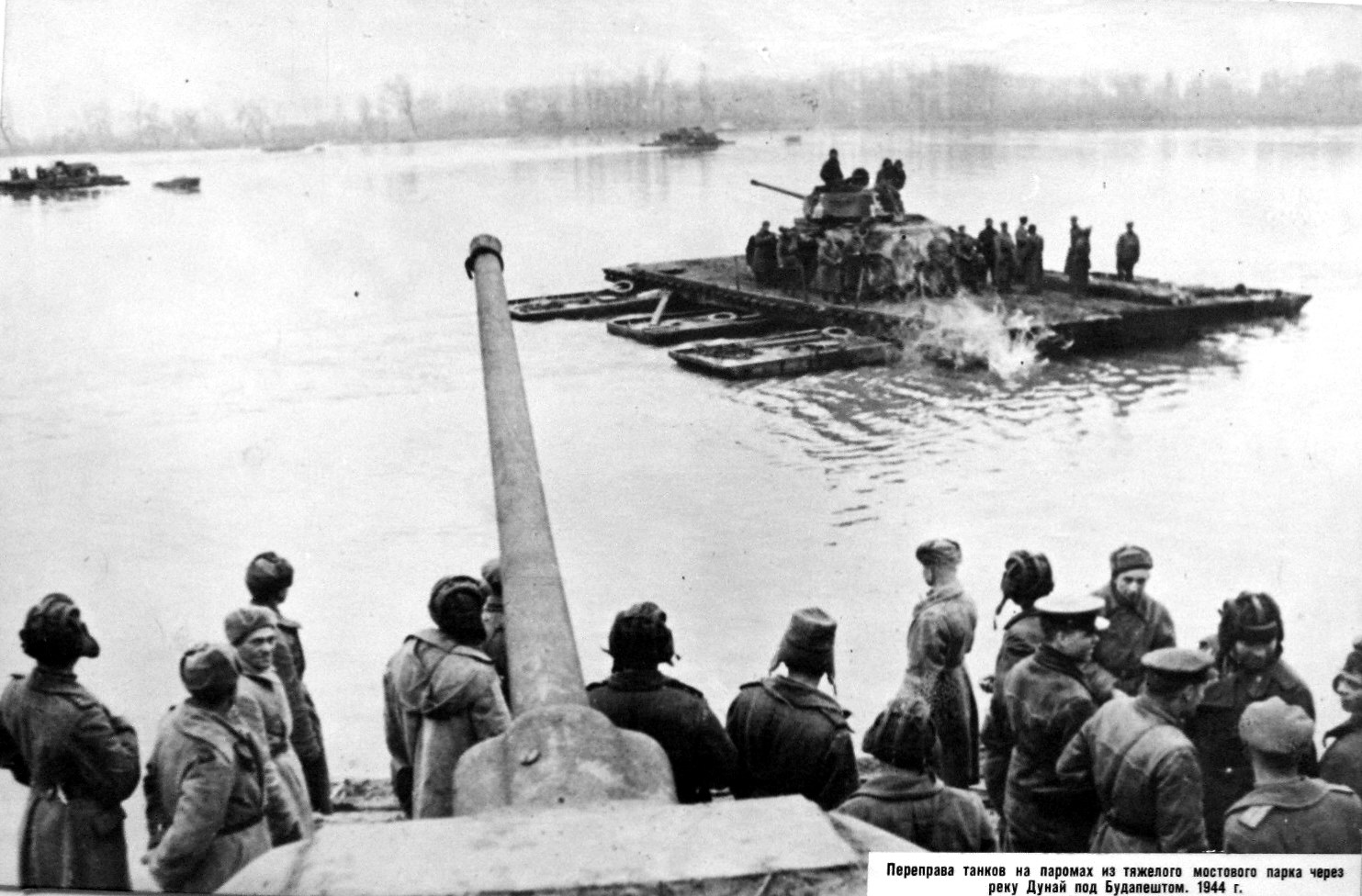
Soviet troops and armor crossing the Danube, early December 1944

Budapest was a major target for Joseph Stalin. The Yalta Conference was approaching, and Stalin wanted to display his full strength to Winston Churchill and Franklin D. Roosevelt. He therefore ordered General Rodion Malinovsky to seize the city without delay. On 28 October, Malinovsky was ordered by Stalin personally to launch an offensive to capture Budapest in less than five days, before all of his forces had even been brought into position. Malinovsky had to obey, even though he knew that such an objective was unrealistic.

The Red Army started its offensive against the city on 29 October 1944. More than 1,000,000 men, split into two operating maneuver groups, advanced. By 5 November, as strategic command was taken over by military experts from Stalin, the Soviets abandoned the plan to quickly capture the city by a southeastern frontal assault, instead they regrouped to isolate Budapest from the rest of the German and Hungarian forces. On 7 November 1944, Soviet and Romanian troops entered the eastern suburbs, 20 kilometers from the old town. The Red Army, after a much-needed pause in operations, resumed its offensive on 19 December. On 26 December, a road linking Budapest to Vienna was seized by Soviet troops, thereby completing the encirclement. The Nazi-supported "Leader of the Nation" (Nemzetvezető), Ferenc Szálasi, had already fled from the city on 9 December.

One notable action during the encirclement was the crossing of the Danube at Ercsi, south of Budapest, on 4 December 1944 by troops of the 2nd Ukrainian Front, for which a considerable 115 Hero of the Soviet Union medals were awarded. Heavy fire destroyed much of the assault force's watercraft during the first crossings, while Axis counterattacks overran the initial beachheads. The Soviets established stable beachheads by 6 December, but suffered heavy casualties, including the loss of several elite companies. Historian Krisztián Ungváry considers the crossing unnecessary, as General Fyodor Tolbukhin's 3rd Ukrainian Front was already advancing from Transdanubia to encircle Buda from the southwest. Ungváry argues that the operation may have been driven by General Malinovsky's desire to claim sole credit for the capture of Budapest and suggests that the subsequent award of medals may have helped to obscure the "pointless sacrifice" of his troops.

As a result of the Soviet link-up, nearly 33,000 German and 37,000 Hungarian soldiers, as well as over 800,000 civilians, became trapped within the city. Refusing to authorize a withdrawal, Adolf Hitler had declared Budapest a fortress city (Festung Budapest), which was to be defended to the last man. Waffen SS General Karl Pfeffer-Wildenbruch, the commander of the IX Waffen SS Alpine Corps, was put in charge of the city's defenses.

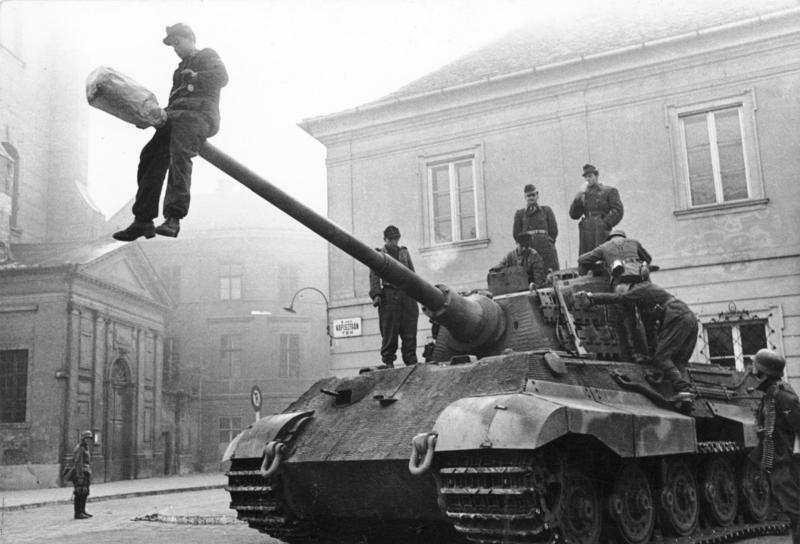
German and Hungarian soldiers on a King Tiger inside the city, October 1944. Only one Tiger II unit was stationed in Budapest

=== Soviet delegation ===
Budapest was the first major European city declared a 'fortress' by Hitler that the Soviets had to capture. The Soviet commanders, drawing on their experience at Stalingrad and wary of costly urban fighting, called upon the Budapest garrison to surrender. During the night of 28 December 1944, the 2nd and 3rd Ukrainian Front contacted the besieged Germans by radios and loudspeakers, and told them about a negotiation for the city's capitulation. The Soviets promised relatively generous surrender conditions and not to mistreat the German and Hungarian prisoners. They also promised that the emissaries' groups would not bring weapons and would appear in cars with white flags.

The next day, two groups of Soviet emissaries appeared as expected. What happened to them later is unclear, but both leaders of the groups died. One possible version of the events is recounted below.

The first, belonging to the 3rd Ukrainian Front, arrived at 10:00 AM in the Budafok sector and was taken to the headquarters of General Pfeffer-Wildenbruch. Their negotiating effort was a failure; Pfeffer-Wildenbruch refused the surrender conditions and sent the Soviet agents back to the battlefield. While the emissaries were en route to their camps, the Germans suddenly opened fire, killing Captain I. A. Ostapenko. Lieutenant N. F. Orlov and Sergeant Ye. T. Gorbatyuk quickly jumped into a trench and narrowly escaped. Owing to heavy German fire, the Soviets were not able to retrieve Ostapenko's body until the night of 29 December. He was buried at Budafok with full military honors. However, accounts by Orlov and a German witness, suggests that the delegates were instead killed by either an uninformed Soviet artillery battery which also caused several German casualties, or Hungarian anti-aircraft guns stationed in the area.

The second group of emissaries belonged to the 2nd Ukrainian Front and arrived at 11:00 AM in the Kispest sector. When the emissaries arrived, the German garrison fired at them. The leader of the emissaries, Captain Miklós Steinmetz, appealed for a negotiation, but to no avail. He was killed together with his two subordinates when the German fire struck the Soviet car. In another account presented by an officer of the Hungarian 12th Reserve Division, Steinmetz's jeep, waving a white flag, drove into an antitank mine laid out on Üllői road. The mines had been laid out on the cobblestone in a chessboard pattern, and the driver attempted to snake through them in walking speed. The jeep hit a mine and both occupants were killed, neither side fired a shot. The accuracy of this account is disputed, but Steinmetz failed to reach German lines. Steinmetz may have also been killed by small arms fire or an anti-tank gun as his jeep approached Axis positions. The historian Ungváry concludes that neither Steinmetz nor Ostapenko were deliberately killed.

The death of the delegates was publicized by Soviet radio, prompting the Wehrmacht to investigate the incident. Pfeffer-Wildenbruch, aware that the killing of the delegates broke international law, claimed that the delegates were German prisoners-of-war and denied the existence of official Soviet delegates. This event was used by German high command to forbid all "fortresses" and army groups from accepting Soviet delegations, on the grounds that this supposed use of prisoners broke international law.

=== First German relief attempt ===
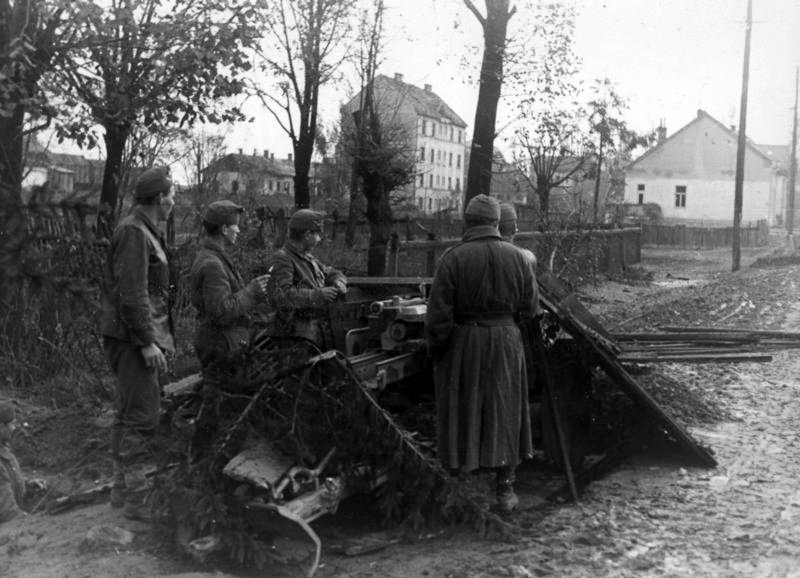
Hungarian troops man a 7.5 cm Pak 40 anti-tank gun in a Budapest suburb, November 1944

The Soviet offensive began in the eastern suburbs, advancing through Pest, making good use of the large central avenues to speed up their progress. The German and Hungarian defenders, overwhelmed, tried to trade space for time to slow down the Soviet advance. They ultimately withdrew to shorten their lines, hoping to take advantage of the hilly nature of Buda. In January 1945, the Germans launched a three-part counter-offensive codenamed Operation Konrad. This was a joint German-Hungarian effort to relieve the encircled garrison of Budapest. Operation Konrad I was launched on 1 January. The German IV SS Panzer Corps attacked from Tata through hilly terrain north-west of Budapest in an effort to break the siege. On 3 January, the Soviet command sent four more divisions to meet the threat, and recalled the Romanian divisions on 15 January because of their inefficiency. This Soviet action stopped the offensive near Bicske, less than 20 kilometers west of Budapest. The Germans were forced to withdraw on 12 January. They then launched Operation Konrad II on 7 January. The IV SS Panzer Corps attacked from Esztergom toward Budapest Airport to capture it and improve ability to supply the city by air. This offensive was halted near the airport.

=== Combat in the city ===
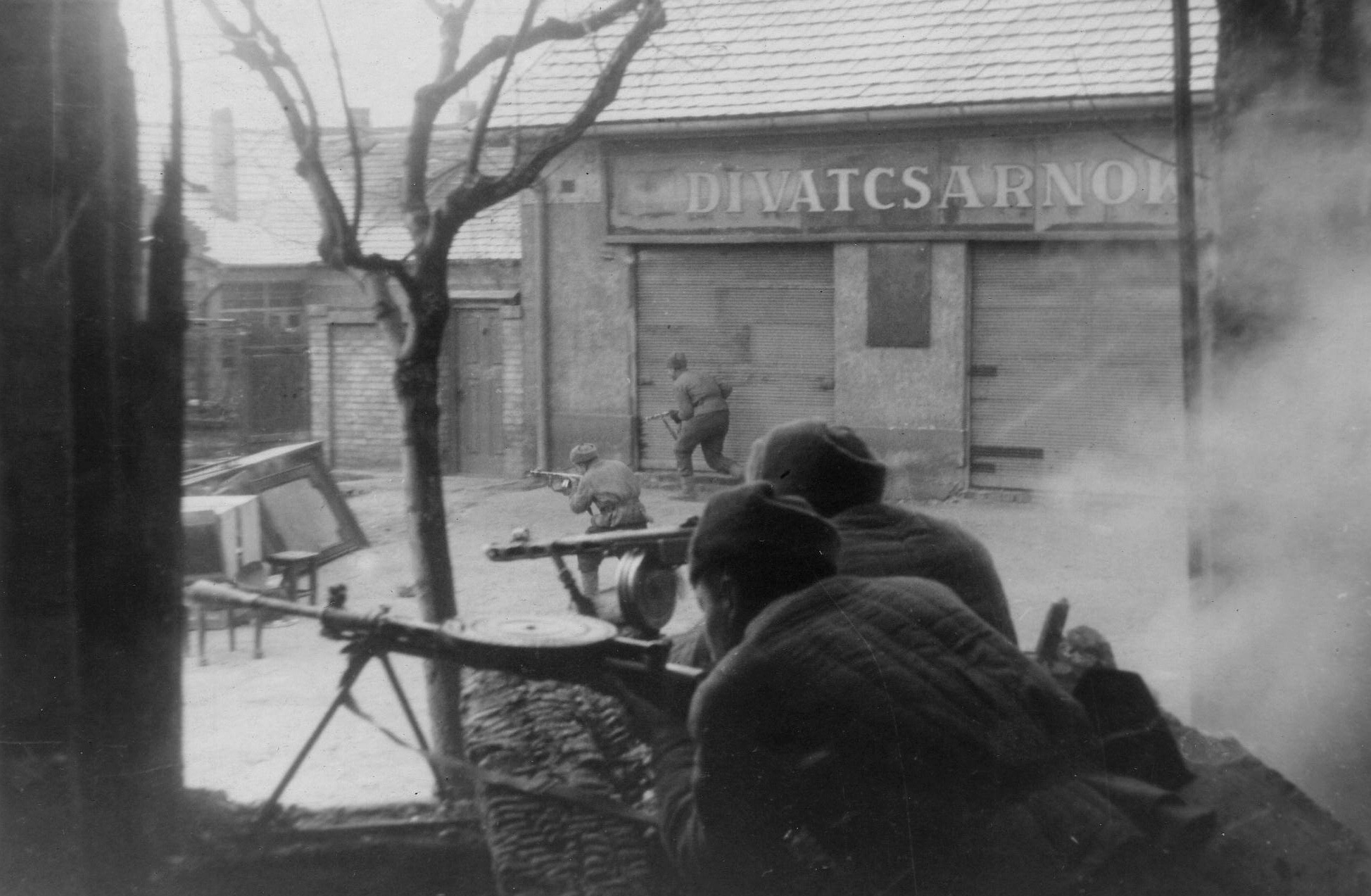
Soviet troops of the 3rd Ukrainian Front engaged in street fighting in Budapest, 8 January 1945

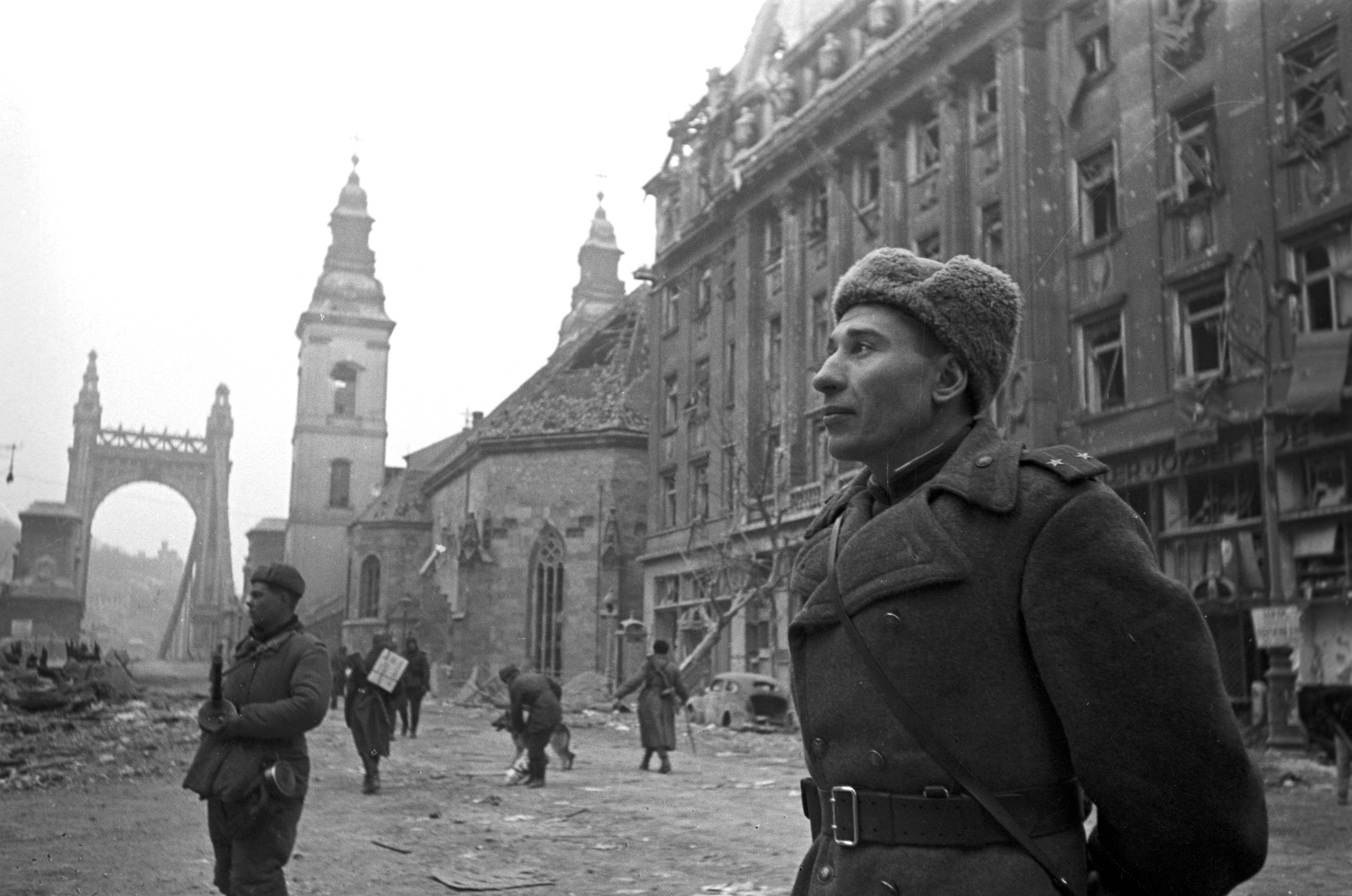
Soviet troops in Pest, next to the Elisabeth Bridge, January 1945

Street fighting in Budapest increased in intensity. Supply became a decisive factor because of the loss of the Ferihegy airport on 27 December 1944, just before the start of the siege. Until 9 January 1945, German troops were able to use some of the main avenues as well as the park next to Buda Castle as landing zones for aircraft and gliders, although they were under constant artillery fire from the Soviets. Before the Danube froze, some supplies could be sent on barges, under the cover of darkness and fog. Food shortages were more and more common and soldiers had to rely on finding their own sources of sustenance, some even resorting to eating their horses. The extreme temperatures also affected German and Hungarian troops. Soviet troops quickly found themselves in the same situation as the Germans had in Stalingrad. They were able to take advantage of the urban terrain by relying heavily on snipers and sappers to advance.

Fighting broke out in the sewers, as both sides used them for troop movements. Six Soviet marines even managed to get to Castle Hill and capture a German officer before returning to their own lines – still underground. Such feats were rare because of ambushes in the sewers set up by the Axis troops using local inhabitants as guides. In mid-January, Csepel Island was taken, along with its military factories, which were still producing Panzerfausts and shells, even under Soviet fire. Meanwhile, in Pest, the situation for the Axis forces deteriorated, with the garrison facing the risk of being cut in half by the advancing Soviet troops. On 17 January 1945, Hitler agreed to withdraw the remaining troops from Pest to try to defend Buda. All five bridges spanning the Danube were clogged with traffic, evacuating troops and civilians. German troops destroyed the bridges 18 January, despite protests from Hungarian officers. One of them was the famous Chain Bridge, dating from 1849.

=== Second German relief attempt ===
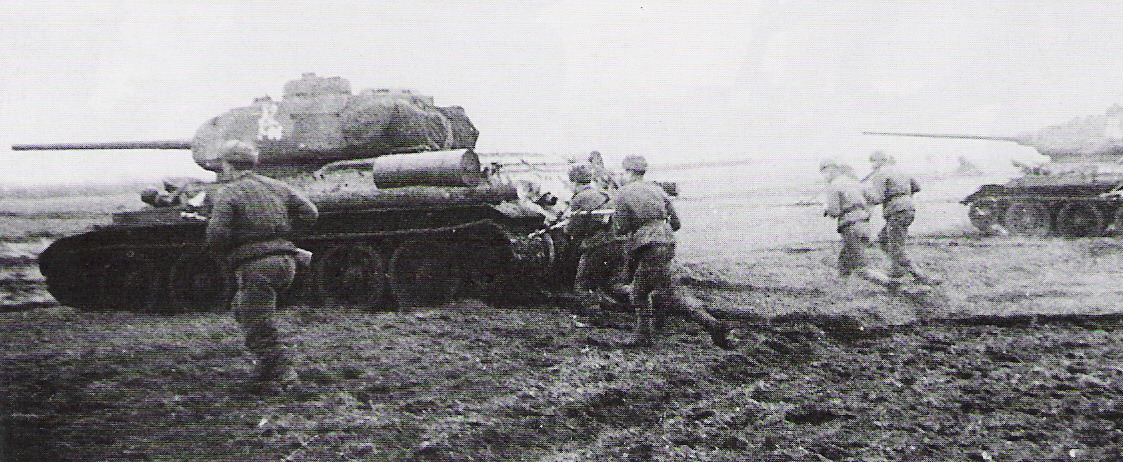
A counterattack of Soviet infantry and tanks of the 18th Tank Corps near Lake Balaton, January 1945

On 18 January 1945, the IV SS Panzer Corps, whose relocation to the region north-east of Lake Balaton had been completed on the previous day, was again thrown into battle. This was Operation Konrad III. In two days the German tanks reached the Danube at Dunapentele, tearing the Soviet Transdanubian front apart, and by 26 January the offensive had reached a point roughly 25 kilometers from the ring around the capital.

Stalin ordered his troops to hold their ground at all costs, and two Army Corps that were dispatched to assault Budapest were hastily moved to the south of the city to counter the German offensive. German troops got within 20 kilometres of the city but were unable to maintain their impetus due to fatigue and supply problems. Budapest's defenders asked permission to leave the city and escape the encirclement. Hitler refused.

German troops could no longer hold their ground; they were forced to withdraw on 28 January 1945, and to abandon much of the occupied territory with the notable exception of Székesfehérvár. The fate of the defenders of Budapest was sealed.

=== The Battle for Buda ===
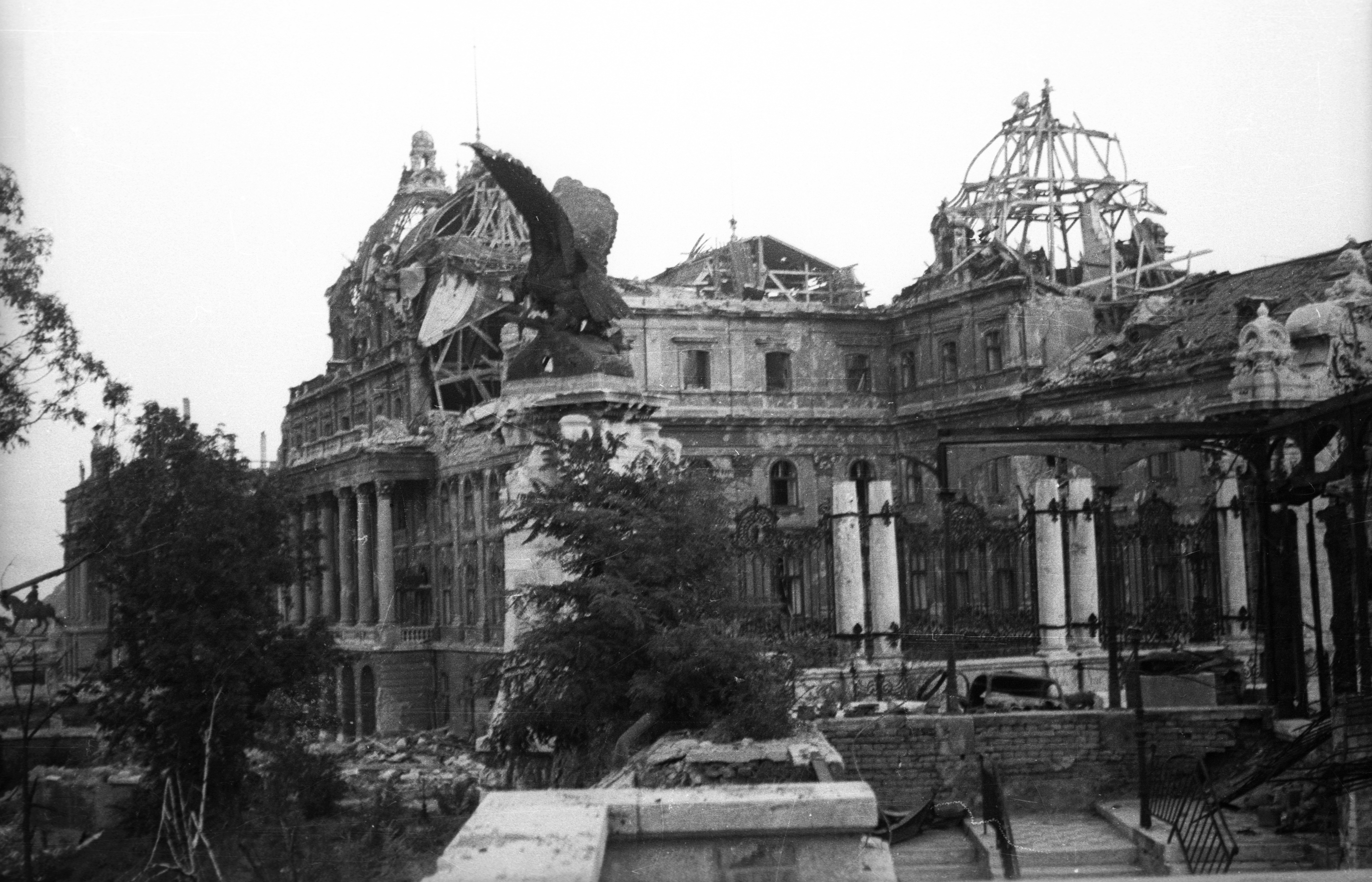
The Turul column and heavily damaged Buda Castle as seen from the cable car terminus

Unlike Pest, which is built on flat terrain, Buda was built on hills. This allowed the defenders to site artillery and fortifications above the attackers, greatly slowing the Soviet advance. The main citadel, (Gellért Hill), was defended by Waffen-SS troops who successfully repelled several Soviet assaults. Nearby, Soviet and German forces were fighting for the city cemetery amongst shell-opened tombs; it would last for several days.

The fighting on Margaret Island, in the middle of the Danube, was particularly merciless. The island was still attached to the rest of the city by the remaining half of the Margaret Bridge and was used as a parachute drop zone as well as for covering improvised airstrips set up in the city center. The 25th Guards Rifle Division operated from the Soviet side in combat on the island (for losses see below).

On 11 February 1945, Gellért Hill finally fell after six weeks of fighting when the Soviets launched a heavy attack from three directions simultaneously. Soviet artillery was able to dominate the entire city and to shell the remaining Axis defenders, who were concentrated in less than two square kilometres and suffering from malnutrition and disease.

Despite the lack of supplies, the Axis troops refused to surrender and defended every street and house. By this time, some captured Hungarian soldiers defected and fought on the Soviet side. They were known collectively as the "Volunteer Regiment of Buda".

After capturing the southern railway station during a two-day bloodbath, Soviet troops advanced to Castle Hill. On 10 February, after a violent assault, Soviet marines established a bridgehead on Castle Hill, while almost cutting the remaining garrison in half.

=== Breakout and surrender ===
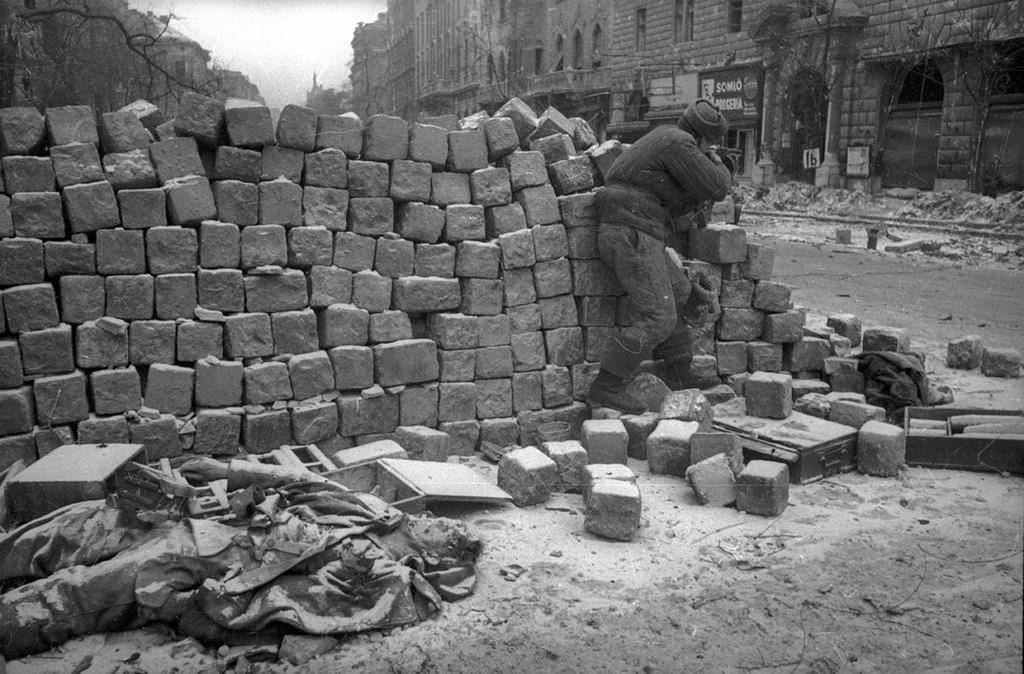
A Soviet soldier taking cover behind a makeshift brick barricade, an Axis soldier lies dead beside him, February 1945

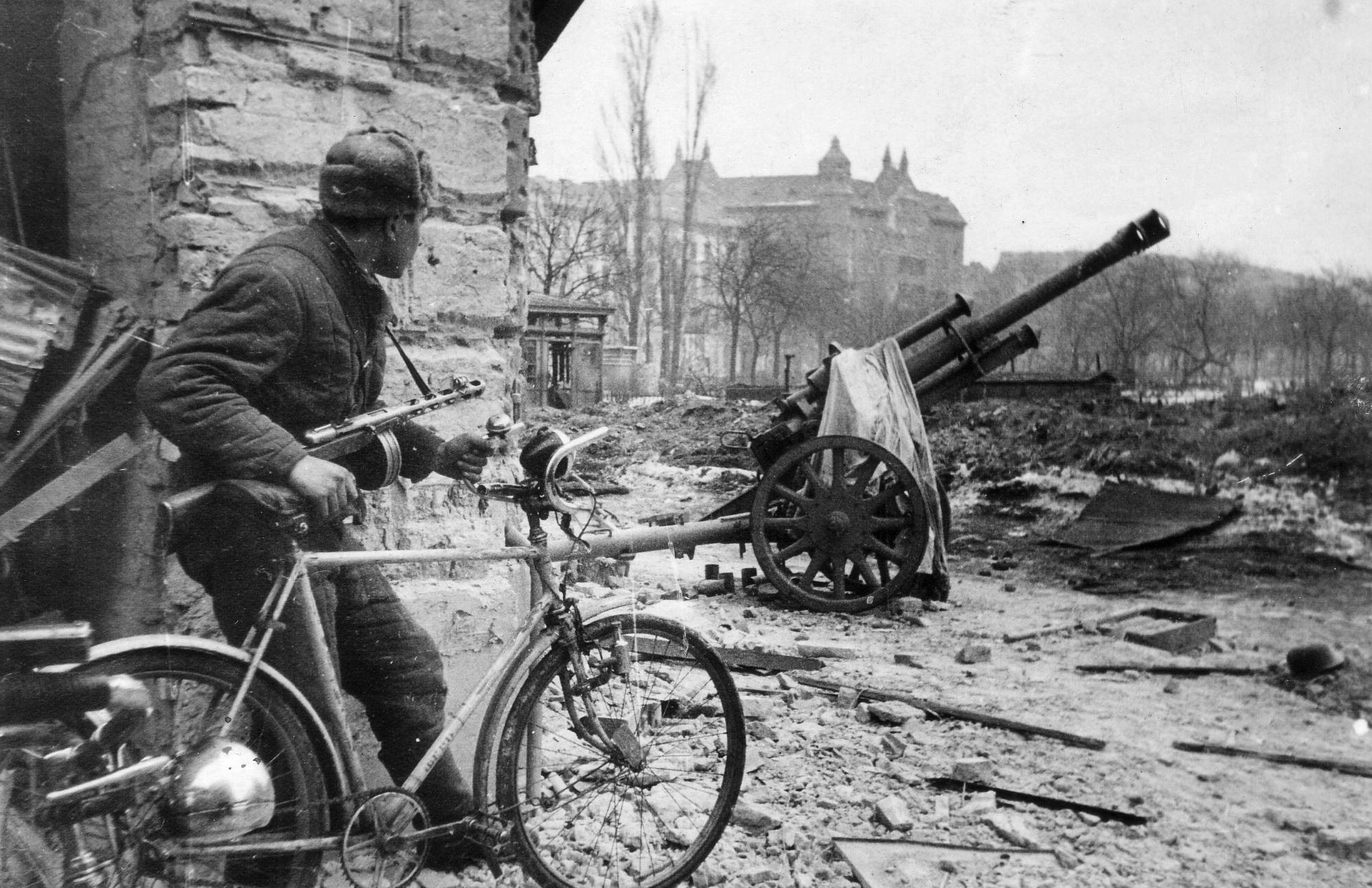
A Soviet soldier in Kálvária square during the siege, looking at an abandoned German 10.5 cm howitzer

Hitler still forbade the German commander, Pfeffer-Wildenbruch, to abandon Budapest or to attempt a breakout. But the glider flights (DFS 230) bringing in supplies had ended a few days earlier and parachute drops had also been discontinued.

In desperation, Pfeffer-Wildenbruch decided to lead the remnants of his troops out of Budapest. The German commander did not typically consult the Hungarian commander of the city. However, Pfeffer-Wildenbruch now uncharacteristically included General Iván Hindy in this last desperate breakout attempt.

On the night of 11 February, some 28,000 German and Hungarian troops began to stream north-westwards away from Castle Hill. They moved in three waves. Thousands of civilians were with each wave. Entire families, pushing prams, trudged through the snow and ice. Unfortunately for the would-be escapees, the Soviets awaited them in prepared positions around the Széll Kálmán tér area.

Troops, along with the civilians, used heavy fog to their advantage. The first wave managed to surprise the waiting Soviet soldiers and artillery; their sheer numbers allowed many to escape. The second and third waves were less fortunate. Soviet artillery and rocket batteries bracketed the escape area, with deadly results that killed thousands. Despite heavy losses, five to ten thousand people managed to reach the wooded hills northwest of Budapest and escape towards Vienna, but only 600–700 German and Hungarian soldiers reached the main German lines from Budapest.

The majority of the escapees were killed, wounded, or captured by the Soviet troops. Pfeffer-Wildenbruch and Hindy were captured by waiting Soviet troops as they emerged from a tunnel running from the Castle District.

== Aftermath ==
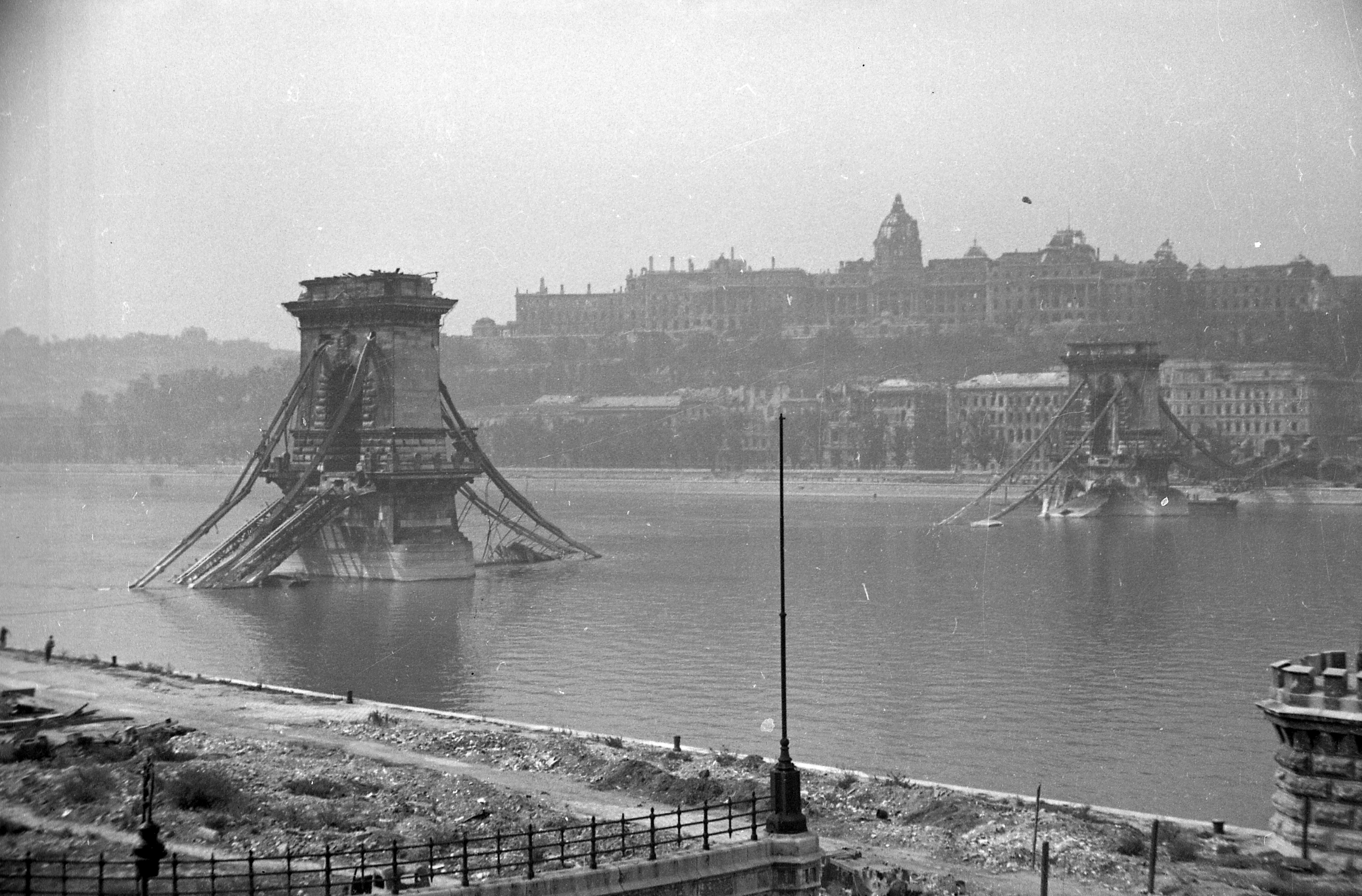
The burnt-out remains of Buda Castle overlooking the destroyed Chain Bridge

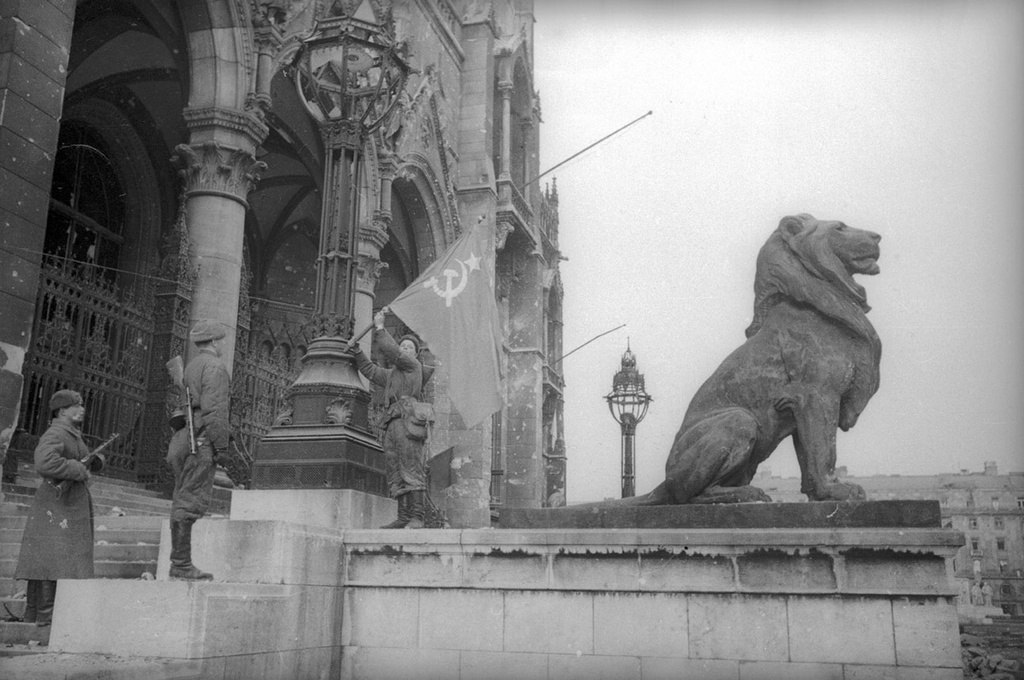
Soviet troops raising the flag on the Hungarian Parliament Building

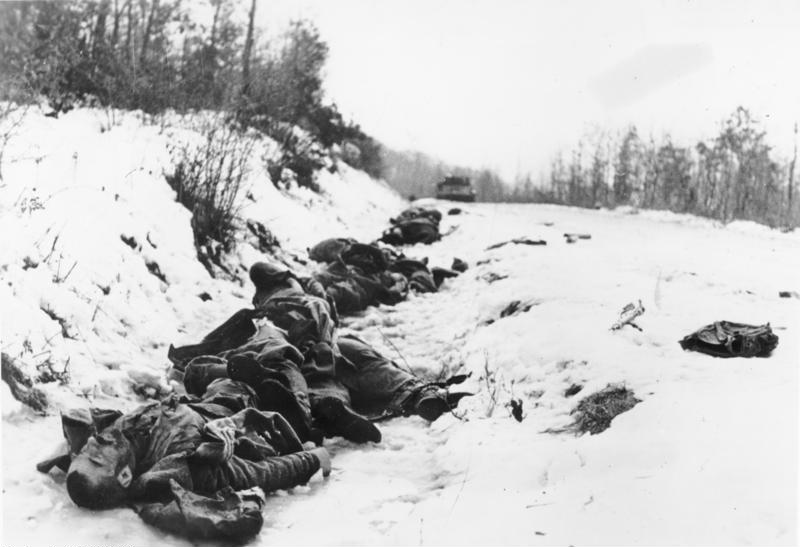
Romanian soldiers killed in Hungary during the Budapest offensive, January 1945

The remaining defenders finally surrendered 13 February 1945. German and Hungarian military losses were high, with entire divisions having been eliminated. The Germans lost all or most of the 13th Panzer Division, 60th Panzergrenadier Division Feldherrnhalle, 8th SS Cavalry Division Florian Geyer and the 22nd SS Volunteer Cavalry Division. The Hungarian I Corps was virtually annihilated, as well as the 10th and 12th Infantry Divisions and the 1st Armored Division.

In 108 days of fighting for Budapest, including losses incurred in action outside of the city, the Soviet forces suffered 320,082 casualties. The Soviets claimed that they had trapped 180,000 German and Hungarian 'fighters' in the pocket, and declared they had captured 110,000 of these soldiers. However, immediately after the siege, they rounded up thousands of Hungarian civilians and added them to the prisoner-of-war count, allowing the Soviets to validate their previously inflated figures.

Budapest lay in ruins, with more than 80 percent of its buildings destroyed or damaged, with historical buildings like the Hungarian Parliament Building and the Castle among them. All seven bridges spanning the Danube were destroyed.

This battle occupies a prominent place among the urban battles of the Second World War, due to the number of casualties, the brutality of the fighting, and its prolonged duration. Historian Krisztián Ungváry writes:

The siege of Budapest was one of the longest and bloodiest city battles of the Second World War. From the appearance of the first Soviet tanks on the outskirts of the capital on 3 November 1944 until the capture of Buda Castle Hill on 13 February 1945, 102 days passed (fighting in the city itself began on 24 December, lasting for 51 days). In contrast, Berlin fell within two weeks and Vienna within five days, while Paris and the rest of the European capitals—except for Warsaw—saw no fighting at all. Other German “fortresses”— for example, Konigsberg and Breslau—resisted for shorter periods, 77 and 82 days, respectively. ...The battle for Budapest was equaled in ferocity only by those for Leningrad, Stalingrad, and Warsaw.

With the exception of Operation Spring Awakening (Unternehmen Frühlingserwachen), which was launched in March 1945, the Siege of Budapest was the last major operation on the southern front for the Germans. The siege further depleted the Wehrmacht and especially the Waffen-SS. For the Soviet troops, the Siege of Budapest was a final rehearsal before the Battle of Berlin. It also allowed the Soviets to launch the Vienna offensive. On 13 April 1945, exactly two months after the surrender of Budapest, Vienna fell.

=== Ethnic German slave labor to Donets ===
In January 1945, 32,000 ethnic Germans from within Hungary were arrested and transported to the Soviet Union as forced laborers. In some villages, the entire adult population were taken to labor camps in the Donets Basin. Many died there as a result of hardship and ill treatment. Overall, more than 500,000 Hungarians were transported to the Soviet Union (including between 100,000 and 170,000 Hungarian ethnic Germans).

Raoul Wallenberg, Sweden's special envoy in Budapest between July and December 1944, had issued protective passports and sheltered Jews in buildings designated as Swedish territory, saving tens of thousands of lives. On January 17, 1945, Wallenberg, who allegedly had links with British, American, and Swedish intelligence, was detained by Soviet authorities and taken to Moscow with his Hungarian driver, Vilmos Langfelder. He subsequently disappeared in the USSR and his fate is still unknown.

After the city's surrender, occupying troops forcibly conscripted all able-bodied Hungarian men and youth to build pontoon bridges across the Danube River. For weeks afterward, especially after the spring thaw, bloated bodies piled up against these same pontoons and bridge pylons.

=== Impact on civilians ===
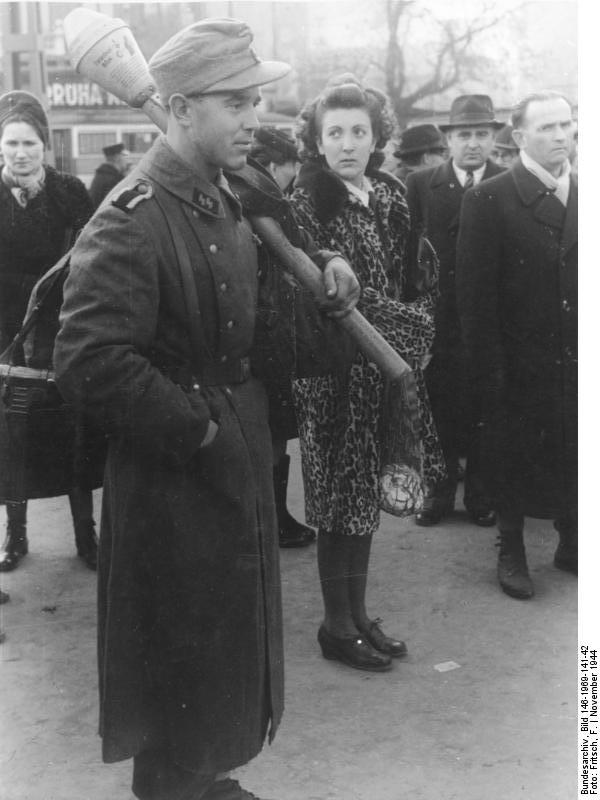
A Waffen-SS soldier with a Panzerfaust amongst civilians in Budapest, November 1944

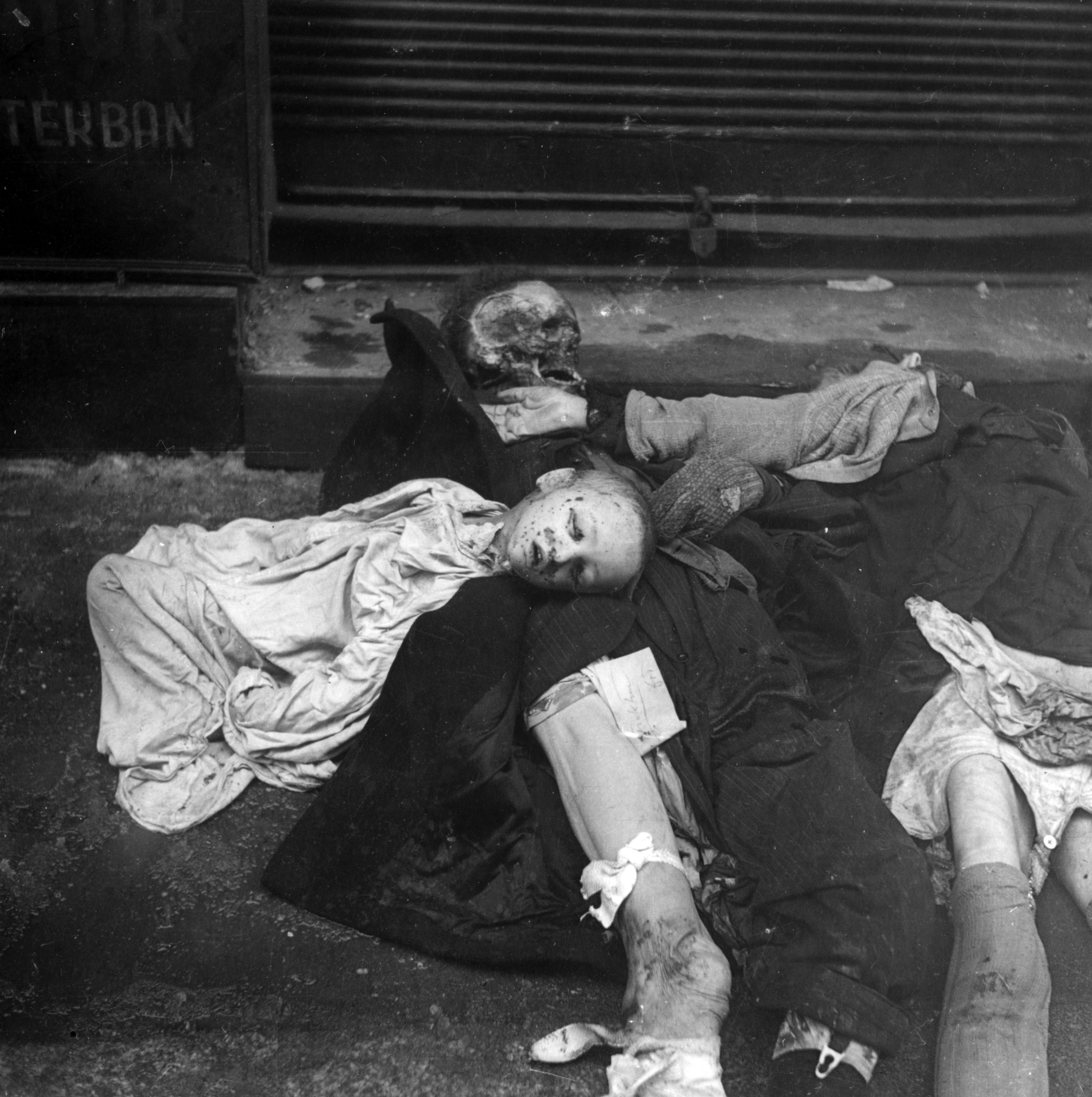
Bodies of Jewish women and a child who died in the Budapest ghetto, February 1945

According to Krisztián Ungváry, some 38,000 civilians died during the siege: about 13,000 from military action and 25,000 from starvation, disease and other causes. Of this number, 15,000 were killed in mass executions of Jews by the far-right Hungarian nationalist Arrow Cross Party. Although the Soviet staff gave orders prohibiting ill treatment of prisoners of war and civilians to almost every unit after the end of hostilities Budapest was flooded by Soviet deserters, and excesses such as looting and mass rape were carried out by Soviets. Despite the fact that the Soviets often took children and entire families under their protection and had a taboo on hurting children, a high number of women and girls were raped, (Note: "The worst suffering of the Hungarian population is due to the rape of women. Rapes—affecting all age groups from ten to seventy are so common that very few women in Hungary have been spared." Swiss embassy report cited in Ungváry (2005)) although estimates vary from 5,000 to 200,000. Norman Naimark argues that Hungarian girls were kidnapped and taken to Red Army quarters, where they were imprisoned, repeatedly raped, and sometimes murdered.

== Order of battle ==
=== Soviet and Romanian units at Pest and Csepel ===
3—5 November 1944

- 2nd, 4th Mechanized Guard Corps

3 November—mid-December 1944

- 10th Guard Rifle Corps
  - 49th, 86th, 109th Guard Rifle Divisions
- 23rd Rifle Corps
  - 99th, 316th Guard Rifle Divisions, 68th Guard Division, 18th Rifle Division

3 November–1 December 1944

- 37th Rifle Corps
  - 320th Rifle Division, 59th, 108th Guard Rifle Divisions

15 November 1944–16 January 1945

- 7th Romanian Army Corps
  - 2nd, 19th Infantry Divisions, 9th Cavalry Division
- 66th Guard Rifle Division

15 November 1944–18 January 1945

- 36th Guard Rifle Division

Beginning 12 December 1944

- 30th Rifle Corps
  - 25th, 36th Guard Rifle Divisions, 151st, 155th Rifle Divisions

From mid-December 1944

- 18th Special Rifle Corps
  - 297th, 317th Rifle Divisions

3–18 January 1945

- 337th Rifle Division

Additional tank units used during the storming of Pest:

- Two battalions from 23rd Tank Corps
- 3rd Tank Brigade
- A company from 39th Tank Brigade

(Totaling 22 tanks)

Artillery on 1 January, Pest

- 203-mm howitzer – 48
- 152-mm gun/howitzer – 172
- 122-mm gun/howitzer – 294
- 76-mm divisional gun – 191
- 76-mm regimental gun – 174
- 45-mm/57-mm AT gun – 158

=== Soviet forces in Buda ===
Beginning 24 December 1944

- 75th Rifle Corps
  - 59th Rifle Division, 108th Guard Division, 320th Rifle Division
- 83rd Marine Infantry Brigade

24 December 1944–3 January 1945

- 2nd Mechanized Guard Corps
- 49th Guard Rifle Division
- 10th Guard Rifle Division
  - 180th, 109th Guard Rifle Divisions
- 23rd Rifle Corps
  - 99th, 316th Rifle Divisions

3–21 January 1945

- 37th Rifle Corps
  - 99th, 316th Rifle Divisions without its staff

Beginning 21 January 1945

- 18th Special Rifle Corps
  - 66th Guard Rifle Division, 297th, 317th Rifle Divisions

21 January 1945

- 5th Artillery Division
- 7th Artillery Division
- 16th Artillery Division
- 462nd Mortar Regiment
- 48th "Katyusha" Regiment
- 12th Assault Engineer Brigade
- 14th Assault Engineer Brigade
- Tank company (9 T-34)

Additional tank units used during the storming of Buda:

- A company from 23rd Tank Corps
- A company from 5th Guards Tank Corps

(Totaling 19 tanks)

Artillery on 1 February, Budapest

- 203-mm howitzer – 69
- 152-mm gun/howitzer – 116
- 122-mm gun/howitzer – 160
- 76-mm divisional gun – 245
- 76-mm regimental gun – 60
- 57-mm AT gun – 20
- 45-mm AT gun – 114
- 82-mm mortar – 307
- 120-mm mortar – 213
- "Katyusha" – 24

Total strength of Soviet and Romanian forces (24 December 1944): 177,000 ration strength, 100,000 combat strength

=== German forces encircled in Budapest (24 December 1944) ===
- Total ration strength: c. 42,600 men
- 8th SS Cavalry Division: c. 8,000
- 22nd SS Cavalry Division: c. 6,345
- Feldherrnhalle Panzergrenadier Division: 7,255
- 13th Panzer Division: 4,983
- Noncombatants and parts of other units trapped in Budapest: 2,500
- Parts of the 271st Volksgrenadier Division: c. 1,000
- 12th Antiaircraft Artillery Assault Regiment: c. 1,000
- Various combat groups: c. 1,500
- Troops directly attached to the IX SS Mountain Army Corps: c. 1,500
- Sick and wounded caught up in Budapest: c. 1,500
- 1st SS Police Regiment: c. 700
- I/40 Heavy Antiaircraft Battalion: c. 500
- Europa Battalion: c. 300
- 573rd Heavy Antiaircraft Detachment: c. 200
- 500th Battalion for Special Use (penal battalion): c. 200
- 12th SS Police Armored Vehicle Company: c. 100

Equipment:

- Artillery/gun pieces: 234
- Heavy anti-tank guns: 62
- Tanks and assault guns: 87

=== Hungarian forces encircled in Budapest (24 December 1944) ===
- Total ration strength: 55,100 men
- 10th Infantry Division: 7,500
- Technical and Pioneer Groups: 7,000
- Budapest Police and its Combat Groups: 7,000
- KISKA Units: 7,000
- 12th Tank Division: 5,000
- 12th Reserve Division: 4,000
- Budapest Military Institutes and Supply Units: 3,000
- Parts of 6 Assault Artillery Battalions: 2,000
- 6 Antiaircraft and Searchlight Battalions: 2,000
- Combat Groups Drafted in Budapest: 2,000
- 5 Gendarmerie Battalions: 1,500
- Hungarist Combat Units: 1,500
- I, II University Assault Battalions: 1,000
- Vannay Flying Squad Battalion: 1,000
- Parts of I Hussar Division: 1,000
- I, II Budapest Assault Companies: 1,000
- Budapest Guard Battalion: 800
- Army Artillery: 500
- Budapest Security Battalion: 300

Equipment:

- Artillery/gun pieces: 250-260
- Heavy anti-tank guns: 55
- Tanks and assault guns: 37-39

During the siege, various ad-hoc combat groups were also formed by the defenders. Auxiliaries such as drivers, cooks, clerks, mechanics, artillery-measuring squads, baggage-train crews, signalers, and engineers were drafted as infantry. One group of the Hungarian 10th Infantry Division (Szabados Group) was reinforced by 200 high school pupils.

== Memoirs and diaries ==
The events in the Naphegy and Krisztinaváros neighborhoods of Budapest are told in a few surviving diaries and memoirs. Charles Farkas (Farkas Karoly) was born in 1926 and includes his experience during the siege in his memoir Vanished by the Danube: Peace, War, Revolution, and Flight to the West. László Dezső, a 15-year-old boy in 1944, lived at 32 Mészáros Street with his family. This area was heavily attacked because of its proximity to the Southern Railway Station (Déli pályaudvar) and the strategic importance of the hill. Dezső kept a diary throughout the siege. The memoirs of András Németh also describe the siege and the bombing of the empty school buildings which he and his fellow soldiers used as an observation post.

The memoirs of Heinz Landau, Goodbye Transylvania, present a German soldier's view of the battle. Pinball Games: Arts of Survival in Nazi and Communist Eras, written by George F. Eber, a richly detailed account of a 20-year-old Hungarian and his family living through the siege, was published posthumously in 2010. It chronicles the clever strategies employed for survival and outlined the boredom and terror of a family who was trapped but would not capitulate. Eber, who had become an internationally known architect, included sketches with the memoir. One of them depicts a Russian soldier silhouetted against a Budapest wall on the first night the Germans were driven out of his neighborhood. The memoir also includes an account of World War II and the post-war transition of the country into Soviet-style communism.

The memoirs of the 14-year-old dispatch runner of the Vannay Volunteer Battalion, Ervin Y. Galantay, give an insight into the battle and urban combat. The diary of the young runner describes day-to-day life and survival of both civilians and soldiers. It was published in English by the Militaria press in Budapest in 2005, under the title Boy Soldier.

Joseph Szentkiralyi, who had worked in the United States prior to World War II, had been deported to Hungary as an enemy alien after the war began. During the siege, he and his family endured constant artillery bombardment and street-by-street tank and infantry battles between the Germans, the remnants of the Royal Hungarian Army, and the attacking Romanian, and Soviet forces. Szentkiralyi, wanted for questioning by Hungarian army officers, hid on the upper floors of buildings during bombing raids to avoid capture. To prevent starvation and help keep their families alive, Szentkiralyi and others risked their lives to leave their bomb shelters at night and butcher frozen horse carcasses they found in the streets. At the end, daily rations consisted of melted snow, horse meat, and 150 grams of bread. Szentkiralyi worked for the Allies after the war ended. Learning that he faced imminent arrest, he fled to Switzerland to avoid detention and likely execution by the Soviets.

== See also ==
- Budapest offensive
- Forced labor of Hungarians in the Soviet Union
- Hospital in the Rock
- Budapest Ghetto
- Operation Konrad
- Operation Spring Awakening
- Operation Southwind

== Bibliography ==
- Andrushchenko, Sergey Aleksandrovich (1979). "5: For Hungary's Capital". Начинали мы на Славутиче [We began at Slavutych] (in Russian). Moscow: Institute of History of the USSR.
- Eber, George F. (17 May 2010). Pinball Games: Arts of Survival in Nazi and Communist Eras. Trafford Publishing. ISBN 978-1-42693-688-3.
- Frieser, Karl-Heinz; Schmider, Klaus; Schönherr, Klaus; Schreiber, Gerhard; Ungváry, Kristián; Wegner, Bernd (2007). "Die Ostfront 1943/44 – Der Krieg im Osten und an den Nebenfronten [The Eastern Front 1943–1944: The War in the East and on the Neighbouring Fronts]". Das Deutsche Reich und der Zweite Weltkrieg [Germany and the Second World War] (in German). Vol. VIII. München: Deutsche Verlags-Anstalt. ISBN 978-3-421-06235-2.
- Isaev, A. V. (2008). 1945-ĭ ... : triumf v nastuplenii i v oborone ot Vislo-Oderskoĭ do Balatona [1945: Triumph both in offence and defence: from Vistula-Oder to Balaton] (in Polish). Moscow. pp. 196, 199, 201. ISBN 978-5-9533-3474-7. OCLC 294760648.
- Naimark, Norman M. (1995). The Russians in Germany: A History of the Soviet Zone of Occupation, 1945–1949. Cambridge: Belknap. ISBN 0-674-78405-7.
- Petö, Andrea (May 5, 2003). "Memory and the Narrative of Rape in Budapest and Vienna in 1945". In Bessel, Richard; Schumann, Dirk (eds.). Life after Death: Approaches to a Cultural and Social History of Europe. Cambridge University Press. pp. 129–148. ISBN 0-521-00922-7.
- Russiyanov, Ivan Nikitich (1982). "17: The Fight for Hungary". В боях рожденная [In the Battle Born]. Moscow: Institute of History of the USSR.
- Samsonov, Alexander Mikhilovich (1980). "18 Helping the European people — Section 7: The Red Army at Hungary". Крах фашистской агрессии 1939-1945 [The collapse of the invading fascists 1939-1945]. Moskva: Institute of History of the USSR.
- Schneider, Wolfgang (2004). Tigers in Combat I. Stackpole Books. ISBN 9780811731713. OCLC 502220933.
- Serikh, Semyon Prokofievich (1988). "3: The Immortal Battalion". Бессмертный батальон [Immortal Battalion]. Moskva: Military Publishing.
- Ther, Philipp (1998). Deutsche Und Polnische Vertriebene: Gesellschaft und Vertriebenenpolitik in SBZ/ddr und in Polen 1945–1956 [German and Polish displaced persons: IDPs society and politics in SBZ/DDR and Poland, 1945-1956] (in German). Vandenhoeck und Ruprecht. ISBN 978-3525357903. OCLC 185654102.
- Ungváry, Krisztián (2003). Budapest Ostroma [Battle for Budapest] (in Hungarian). London: I. B. Tauris. ISBN 1-86064-727-8.
- Ungváry, Krisztián (2005). The Siege of Budapest: One Hundred Days in World War II. Translated by Löb, Ladislaus. Yale University Press. ISBN 9781350141391. OCLC 1124264644.
