= Helge Jansson =

Swedish high jumper and decathlete

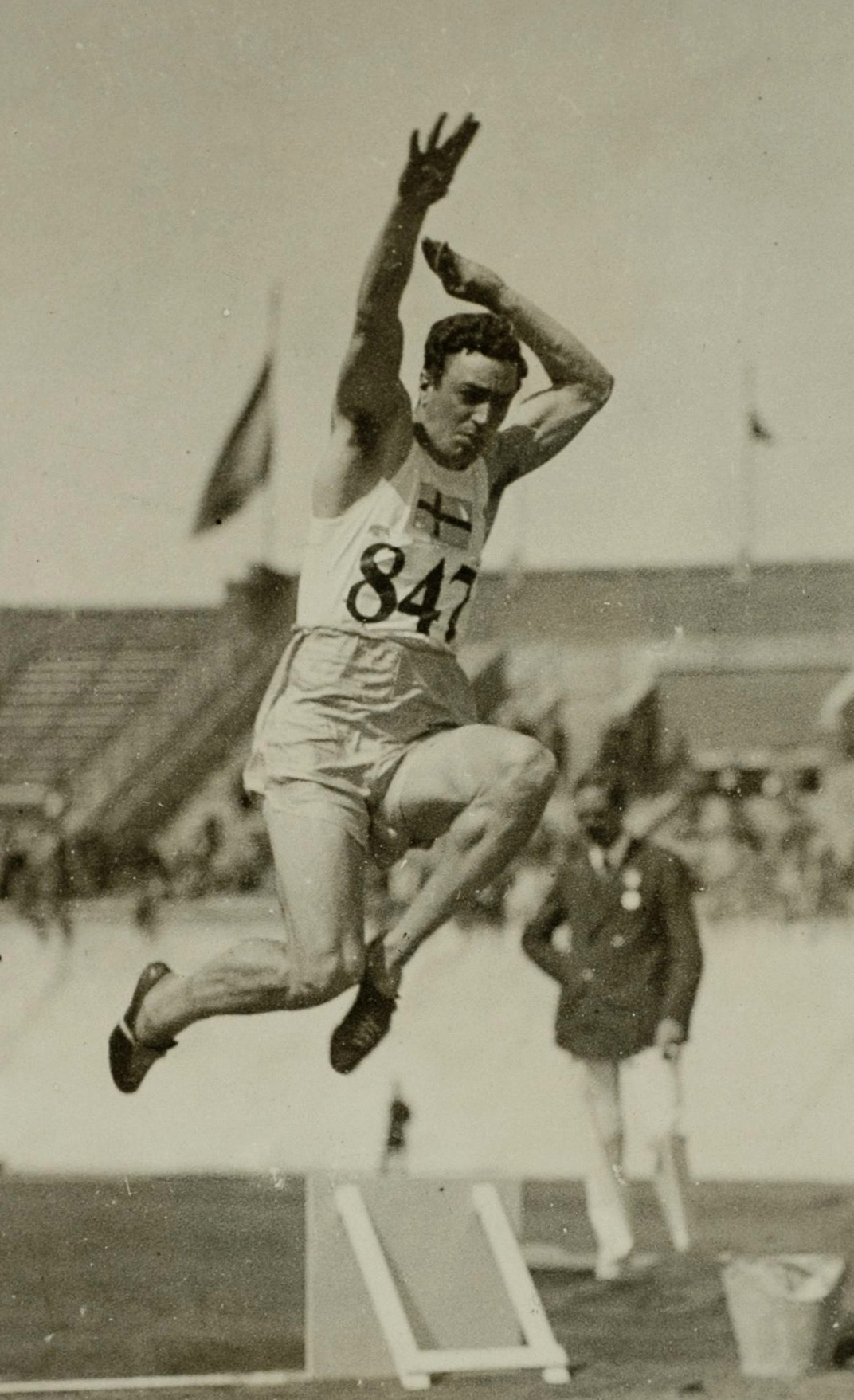
- Helge Jansson at the 1928 Olympics

Personal information
- Born: 1 June 1904 Eksjö, Sweden
- Died: 17 October 1989 (aged 85) Gothenburg, Sweden
- Height: 1.88 m (6 ft 2 in)
- Weight: 88 kg (194 lb)

Sport
- Sport: Athletics
- Club: Eksjö GIK; Göteborgs Polismäns IF

Achievements and titles
- Olympic finals: 1924, 1928

Helge Alexander Jansson (1 June 1904 – 17 October 1989) was a Swedish athlete. He competed at the 1924 and 1928 Olympics and finished in seventh and sixth place in the decathlon, respectively; in 1924 he was also sixth in the high jump with a result of 1.85 m, three centimeters below his personal best.
