= Bror Kraemer =

Finnish high jumper (1900–1990)

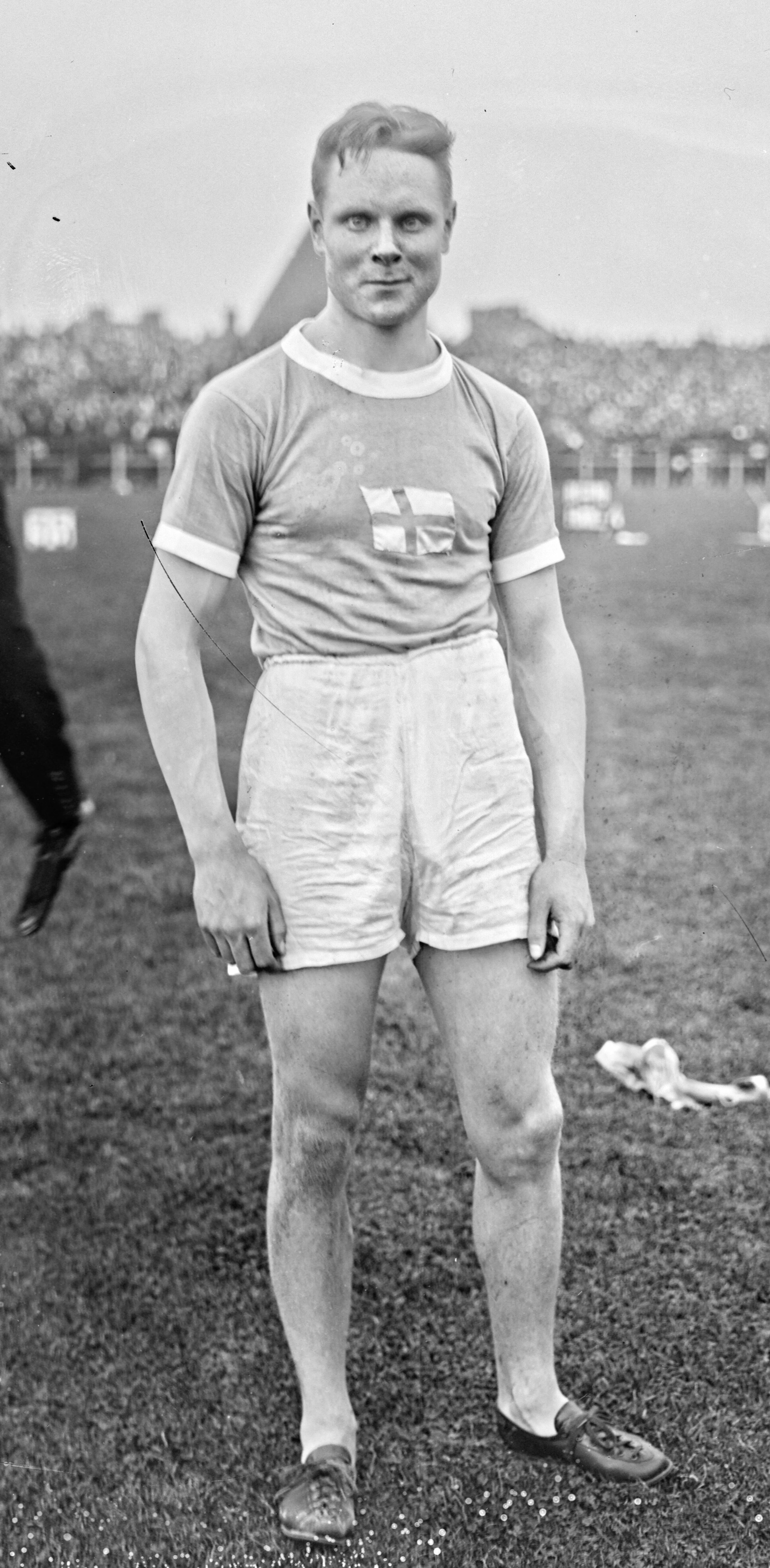
- Bror Kraemer in 1922

Personal information
- Born: 22 February 1900 Turku, Finland
- Died: 20 January 1990 (aged 89) Helsinki, Finland
- Height: 1.70 m (5 ft 7 in)
- Weight: 63 kg (139 lb)

Sport
- Sport: Athletics
- Event: High jump
- Club: Vasa IS

Achievements and titles
- Personal best: 1.87 m (1922)

Bror August Kraemer (22 February 1900 – 20 January 1990) was a Finnish high jumper. He competed at the 1924 Summer Olympics and finished in 19th place.
