= Pierre Lewden =

French high jumper

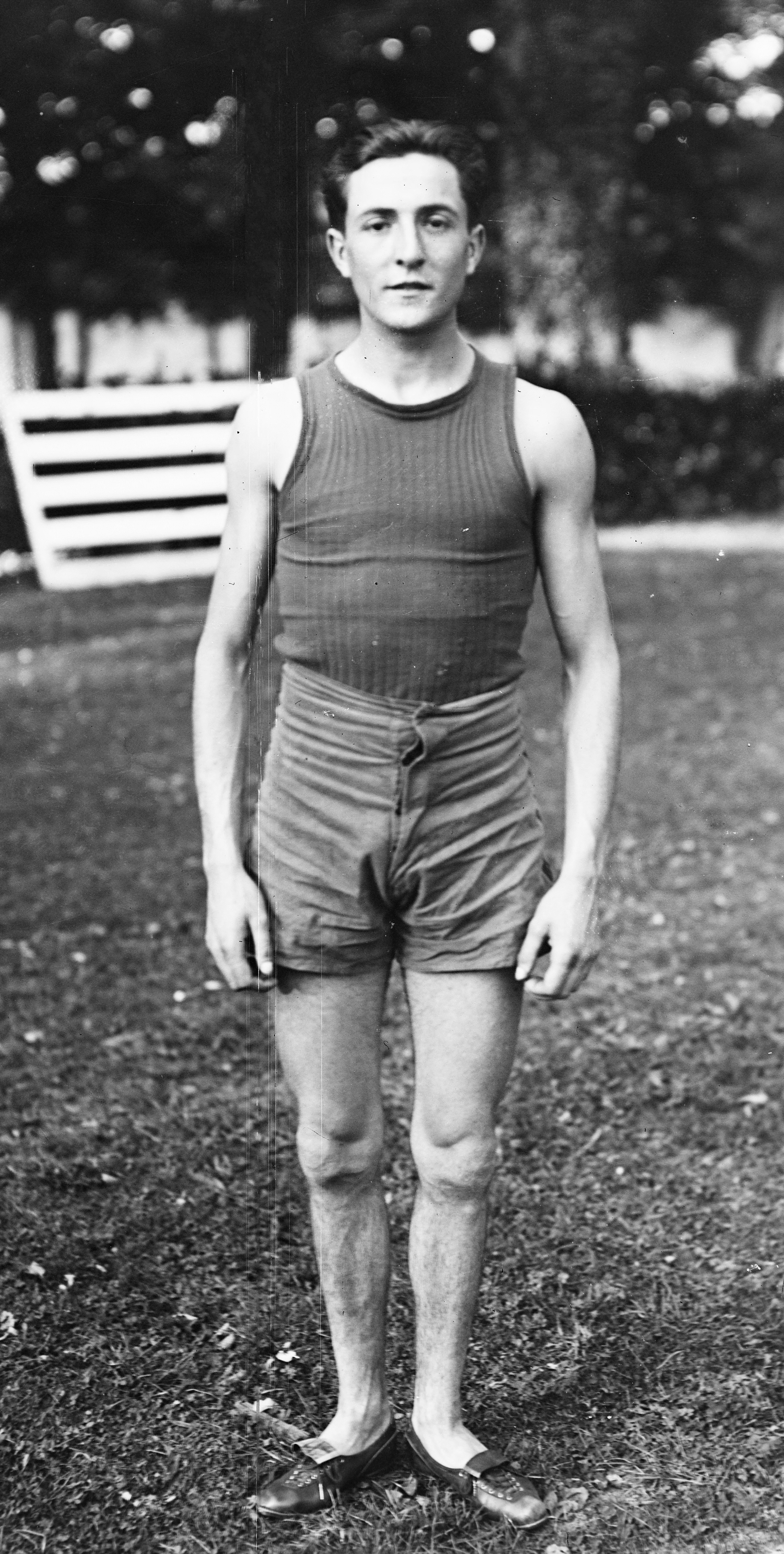
- Pierre Lewden in 1920

Personal information
- Born: 21 February 1901 Libourne, France
- Died: 30 April 1989 (aged 88) Montberthault, France
- Height: 1.67 m (5 ft 6 in)
- Weight: 64 kg (141 lb)

Sport
- Sport: Athletics
- Event: High jump
- Club: Stade français, Paris

Achievements and titles
- Personal best: 1.95 m (1925)
Medal record
Representing France
Olympic Games
Bronze medal – third place	1924 Paris	High jump

Pierre Lewden (21 February 1901 – 30 April 1989) was a French high jumper who competed at the 1920, 1924 and 1928 Olympics. He won a bronze medal in 1924 and finished in seventh place in 1920 and 1928. Despite his short stature (1.67 m), Lewden was ranked #1–2 in Europe and #3–9 in the world in 1921–1925.

Lewden won the British AAA Championships title in the high jump event at the 1922 AAA Championships and returned the following year to win both the high jump and pole jump titles, at the 1923 AAA Championships.

In 1925, Lewden finished second behind Harold Osborn in the high jump event at the 1925 AAA Championships.
