= Arthur Willis (athlete) =

British athlete

Personal information
- Nationality: British
- Born: 25 August 1893 Eastbourne, England
- Died: 5 April 1979 (aged 85) Dorchester, England

Sport
- Sport: Athletics
- Event: High jump
- Club: University of Cambridge AC; Achilles Club

Arthur Gilbert de Laval Willis (25 August 1893 – 5 April 1979) was an Anglican clergyman and British athlete. He competed in the men's high jump at the 1924 Summer Olympics.

== Early life and education ==
The son of Rev. William Newcombe Willis, founder of Ascham St Vincent's School, Eastbourne, East Sussex, he was educated at Emmanuel College, Cambridge (BA 1926, MA 1929).

== Career ==
During the First World War he reached the rank of lieutenant in the Royal Navy, He later served with the Tank Corps, holding the rank of lieutenant at the time of his participation in the 1924 Olympics and that of major at the time of his ordination.

Willis finished second behind Larry Stanley in the high jump event at the 1924 AAA Championships. Shortly afterwards he was selected for the British team at the 1924 Olympic Games in Paris.

When his father retired in 1927, Willis took over Ascham St Vincent's School, running it until 1938, when he closed and sold the school and resumed his military career in light of the situation in Europe that led to the Second World War.

Willis later studied at Ripon Hall in Oxford until 1956, in which year he was ordained a deacon, subsequently ordained a priest in 1957. He died in 1979. He had married in 1917, Ruth R. Davis; they had two sons and a daughter.
