= Pierre Guilloux =

French high jumper (1901–1937)

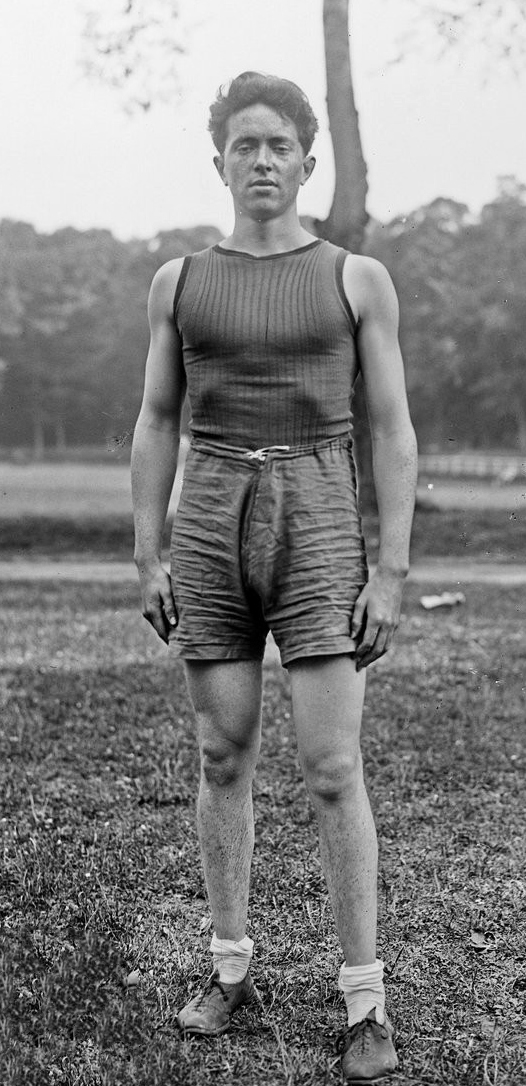
- Pierre Guilloux in 1921

Personal information
- Born: 19 October 1901 Paris, France
- Died: 7 September 1937 (aged 35) Marseille, France

Sport
- Sport: Athletics
- Event: High jump
- Club: Stade français, Paris

Achievements and titles
- Personal best: 1.88 (1924)

Pierre Guilloux (19 October 1901 – 7 September 1937) was a French high jumper and basketball player.

== Career ==
Guilloux competed at the 1920 and 1924 Summer Olympics and finished seventh in 1924. Guilloux finished second behind Benjamin Howard Baker in the high jump event at the British 1921 AAA Championships.
