= 1980 UK Athletics Championships =

British

- Dates: 14 & 15 June 1980
- Host city: London, England
- Venue: Crystal Palace Athletics Stadium
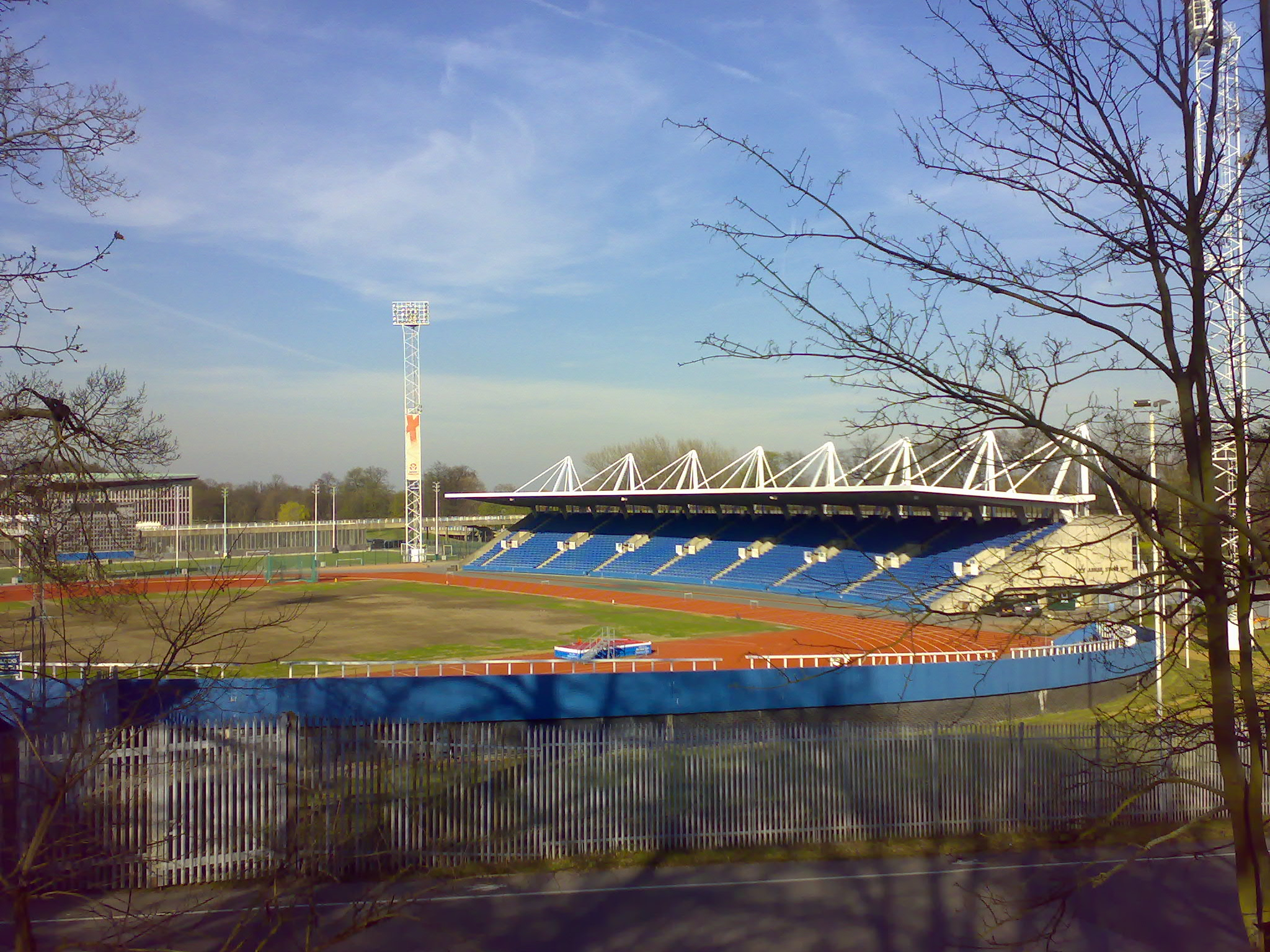
- Level: Senior
- Type: Outdoor

The 1980 UK Athletics Championships was the national championship in outdoor track and field for the United Kingdom held at Crystal Palace Athletics Stadium, London. Three events were contested separately at Meadowbank Stadium, Edinburgh – the women's 1500 metres and men's 800 metres and 5000 metres. This set of events served as the British Olympic Team Trials for the 1980 Summer Olympics.

It was the fourth edition of the competition limited to British athletes only, launched as an alternative to the AAA Championships, which was open to foreign competitors. However, because the calibre of national competition remained greater at the AAA event, the UK Championships this year were not considered the principal national championship event by some statisticians, such as the National Union of Track Statisticians (NUTS). Many of the athletes below also competed at the 1980 AAA Championships.

== Summary ==
Two new events were contested for the first time: a men's 10,000 metres track walk and a women's 5000 metres track walk.

Women's discus thrower Meg Ritchie took a record fourth consecutive UK title. David Ottley won a third straight title in the javelin throw. Five other athletes defended their 1979 titles: Gary Oakes in the 400 metres hurdles, Heather Hunte in the women's 100 m, Christina Boxer in the women's 800 m, Shirley Strong in the women's 100 metres hurdles and Angela Littlewood in the women's shot put. Two athletes achieved a championship double: Cameron Sharp edged out Drew McMaster in both the men's 100 metres and 200 metres, and David Moorcroft claimed a 1500/5000 m double.

At the 1980 Moscow Olympics, one participant at the UK trials won an individual medal – hurdles champion Gary Oakes took Olympic bronze. The four women who took the top three in the short sprints (Hunte, Kathy Smallwood, Beverley Goddard, and Sonia Lannaman) combined to win an Olympic bronze in the 4 × 100 metres relay, and the top three in the women's 400 metres (Linsey Macdonald, Joslyn Hoyte-Smith and Michelle Probert) joined Donna Hartley to take the 4 × 400 metres relay Olympic bronze. Allan Wells, Sebastian Coe, Steve Ovett and Daley Thompson made the 1980 Olympic podium, but were not present at this national event.

== Medals ==
=== Men ===
Event	Gold		Silver		Bronze	
100m	(Scotland) Cameron Sharp	10.60	Drew McMaster	10.71	Trevor Hoyte	10.71
200m	(Scotland) Cameron Sharp	21.02	(Scotland) Drew McMaster	21.15	Phil Brown	21.23
400m	(Scotland) David Jenkins	45.29	Alan Bell	45.80	Glen Cohen	45.93
800m	David Warren	1:48.54	(Scotland) Paul Forbes	1:49.75	Steve Cram	1:50.16
1,500m	David Moorcroft	3:41.46	(Scotland) Graham Wiliamson	3:42.42	David Warren	3:43.45
5,000m	David Moorcroft	13:41.8	Nick Rose	13:42.1	Barry Smith	13:44.4
10,000m	Geoff Smith	28:20.24	Bernie Ford	28:26.84	Ray Smedley	28:40.55
110m hurdles	Wilbert Greaves	14.05	Mark Holtom	14.17	Berwyn Price	14.64
400m hurdles	Gary Oakes	50.24	Bill Hartley	51.39	Bob Danville	51.52
3000m steeplechase	Tony Staynings	8:27.21	Roger Hackney	8:29.53	Colin Reitz	8:30.93
10,000m walk	Adrian James	43:26.21	Mick Holmes	43:34.55	Allan King (athlete)	43:47.67
high jump	Mark Naylor	2.22 m	Ossie Cham	2.18 m	(Scotland) Brian Burgess	2.15 m
pole vault	Keith Stock	5.30 m	Brian Hooper	5.25 m	Tim Anstiss	4.80 m
long jump	Roy Mitchell	7.74 m	John Herbert	7.72w m	Tony Henry	7.56 m
triple jump	Keith Connor	16.77 m	Frank Attoh	16.00 m	David Johnson	15.43 m
shot put	Mike Winch	18.96 m	Simon Rodhouse	17.44 m	Richard Slaney	17.27 m
discus throw	Pete Tancred	56.42 m	(Scotland) Colin Sutherland	55.38 m	Richard Slaney	54.96 m
hammer throw	Paul Dickenson	71.34 m	(Scotland) Chris Black	70.56 m	Jim Whitehead	68.28 m
javelin throw	David Ottley	84.10 m	John Trower	80.20 m	Peter Yates	78.82 m

=== Women ===
Event	Gold		Silver		Bronze	
100m	Heather Hunte	11.33	Sonia Lannaman	11.38	Kathy Smallwood	11.46
200m	Kathy Smallwood	22.62	Heather Hunte	23.06	Beverley Goddard	23.12
400m	(Scotland) Linsey MacDonald	51.16	Joslyn Hoyte-Smith	51.47	Michelle Probert	52.31
800m	Christina Boxer	2:02.18	Cherry Hanson	2:02.66	Janet Marlow	2:02.70
1,500m	Jo White	4:19.48	Wendy Smith	4:22.42	(Wales) Hilary Hollick	4:22.57
3,000m	Kathryn Binns	9:01.65	Paula Fudge	9:04.14	Sue Hutton	9:14.72
100m hurdles	Shirley Strong	13.48	Lorna Boothe	13.67	Judy Livermore	13.69
400m hurdles	Susan Dalgoutté	57.79	Sue Morley	58.24	Wendy Griffiths	58.56
5,000m walk	Carol Tyson	23:48.62	Irene Bateman	24:06.87	Elaine Cox	25:22.32
High jump	Louise Miller	1.88 m	Ann-Marie Devally	1.86 m	Diana Elliott	1.83 m
Long jump	Sue Hearnshaw	6.47w m	Sue Reeve	6.41 m	Sandra Green	6.27 m
Shot put	Angela Littlewood	17.17 m	Vanessa Redford	15.46 m	Susan Tudor	13.87 m
Discus throw	(Scotland) Meg Ritchie	62.16 m	Lesley Mallin	52.52 m	Vanessa Redford	50.20 m
Javelin throw	(Scotland) Diane Royle	49.52 m	Janeen Williams	49.30 m	Jeanette Rose	49.06 m
