= 1984 UK Athletics Championships =

British athletics event

- Dates: 26 & 27 May 1984
- Host city: Cwmbran, Wales
- Venue: Cwmbran Stadium
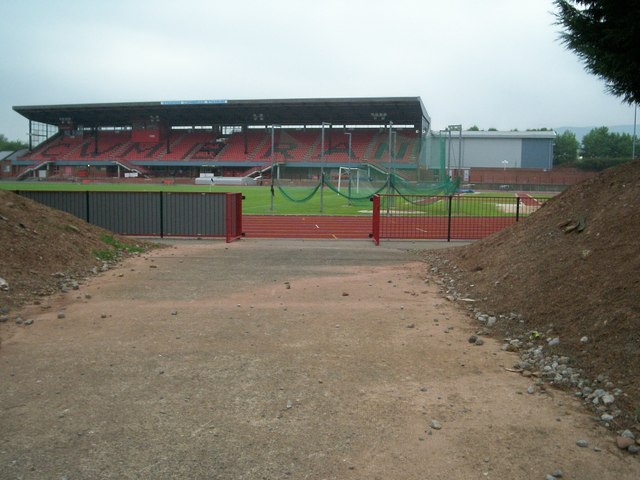
- Level: Senior
- Type: Outdoor

The 1984 UK Athletics Championships was the national championship in outdoor track and field for the United Kingdom held at Cwmbran Stadium, Cwmbran, Wales. It was the third time the event was held in the Welsh town, following on from its hosting in 1977 and 1982.

It was the eighth edition of the competition limited to British athletes only, launched as an alternative to the AAA Championships, which was open to foreign competitors. However, because the calibre of national competition remained greater at the AAA event, the UK Championships this year were not considered the principal national championship event by some statisticians, such as the National Union of Track Statisticians (NUTS). Many of the athletes below also competed at the 1984 AAA Championships.

== Summary ==
The competition was affected by heavy winds that year, particularly the jumps and sprints.

Fatima Whitbread won her fourth consecutive women's javelin throw UK title, while Aston Moore won his third straight men's triple jump title. Aside from Moore, four men successfully defended their 1983 titles and Peter Elliott (1500 metres), Keith Stock (pole vault), Derrick Brown (long jump) and Peter Yates (javelin). Venissa Head was the only woman to defend her title, doing so in the discus throw. Heather Oakes was the only athlete to win multiple UK titles, taking the women's 100 metres and 200 metres to repeat a feat she had achieved five years previously.

The main international track and field competition for the United Kingdom that year was the 1984 Olympic Games. Reflecting the secondary nature of the UK competition and the fact it was not used as the Olympic trial event, only one of the 14 British individual Olympic medallists took a UK title that year – Fatima Whitbread. British Olympic relay medallists Simmone Jacobs, Heather Oakes and Kriss Akabusi were present at the UK Championships, however.

== Medals ==
=== Men ===
Event	Gold		Silver		Bronze	
100m (wind: +4.5 m/s)	Mike McFarlane	10.08 w	Buster Watson	10.12 w	Donovan Reid	10.17 w
200m	Todd Bennett	20.36	Donovan Reid	20.62	(Scotland) Gus McCuaig	20.86
400m	Kriss Akabusi	46.10	Roy Dickens	46.19	Alan Slack	46.49
800m	Peter Elliott	1:46.08	Rob Harrison	1:46.43	Gareth Brown	1:46.48
1,500m	Alan Salter	3:43.31	Steve Martin	3:43.42	David Lewis	3:43.58
5,000m	Eamonn Martin	13:32.11	Geoff Turnbull	13:33.86	Steve Harris	13:39.95
10,000m	Nick Rose	28:00.70	(Wales) Steve Jones	28:12.51	Julian Goater	28:13.02
110m hurdles (wind: +2.7 m/s)	Hughie Teape	13.98 w	Wilbert Greaves	14.09 w	Paul Brice	14.27 w
400m hurdles	Martin Briggs	50.97	(Northern Ireland) Phil Beattie	51.35	(Scotland) Stan Devine	51.67
3000m steeplechase	Paul Davies-Hale	8:33.16	Tony Blackwell	8:40.58	Ken Baker	8:48.05
10,000m walk	Phil Vesty	40:53.60	Martin Rush	41:49.63	Richard Dorman	43:34.50
high jump	Alex Kruger	2.15 m	Rupert Charles	2.15 m	David Abrahams	2.10 m
pole vault	Keith Stock	5.35 m	Jeff Gutteridge	5.30 m	Billy Davey	5.00 m
long jump	Derrick Brown	7.71 m w	Trevor Hoyte	7.69 m w	Fred Salle	7.57 m w
triple jump	Aston Moore	16.80 m	Eric McCalla	16.74 m	John Herbert	16.53 m
shot put	Billy Cole	17.57 m	Mark Aldridge	17.07 m	Nick Tabor	16.95 m
discus throw	Paul Mardle	59.70 m	Peter Gordon	58.10 m	Graham Savory	56.90 m
hammer throw	Dave Smith	72.34 m	Paul Dickenson	69.98 m	Paul Head	63.46 m
javelin throw	Peter Yates	82.54 m	Marcus Humphries	75.34 m	Simon Osborne	75.34 m

=== Women ===
Event	Gold		Silver		Bronze	
100m (wind: +3.8 m/s)	Heather Oakes	11.08 w	Shirley Thomas	11.13 w	Simmone Jacobs	11.26 w
200m (wind: +2.1 m/s)	Heather Oakes	23.00 w	Simmone Jacobs	23.01 w	Shirley Thomas	23.14 w
400m	Jane Parry	53.46	Tracy Lawton	53.73	Joslyn Hoyte-Smith	53.76
800m	Christina Boxer	2:01.64	Jane Finch	2:01.73	Lorraine Baker	2:02.11
1,500m	Zola Budd	4:04.39	(Scotland) Lynne MacDougall	4:10.80	Suzanne Morley	4:13.89
3,000m	Christine Benning	8:56.79	(Wales) Angela Tooby	8:59.69	(Wales) Susan Tooby	9:11.05
5,000m	(Wales) Angela Tooby	15:27.56	(Wales) Susan Tooby	15:35.40	(Scotland) Yvonne Murray	15:50.54
100m hurdles (wind: +4.5 m/s)	(Scotland) Pat Rollo	13.12 w	Heather Ross	13.22 w	Wendy Jeal	13.41 w
400m hurdles	Gladys Taylor	58.2	Wendy Griffiths	58.2	Simone Gandy	58.76
5000m walk	Jill Barrett	23:53.13	Nicky Jackson	24:02.15	Helen Elleker	24:04.84
high jump	Diana Elliott	1.90 m	Judy Simpson	1.84 m	Louise Manning	1.84 m
long jump	Sue Hearnshaw	7.00 m w	Joyce Oladapo	6.54 m w	Georgina Oladapo	6.51 m w
shot put	Judy Oakes	17.94 m	Myrtle Augee	16.68 m	Yvonne Hanson-Nortey	14.48 m
discus throw	(Wales) Venissa Head	57.44 m	Lynda Whiteley	51.20 m	Karen Pugh	49.56 m
javelin throw	Fatima Whitbread	65.44 m	Sharon Gibson	58.78 m	(Scotland) Diane Royle	58.42 m
