= 1979 AAA Championships =

Outdoor track and field competition

- Dates: 13–14 July 1979
- Host city: London, England
- Venue: Crystal Palace National Sports Centre
- Level: Senior
- Type: Outdoor

The 1979 AAA Championships sponsored by Nationwide was the 1979 edition of the annual outdoor track and field competition organised by the Amateur Athletic Association (AAA). It was held from 13 to 14 July 1979 at the Crystal Palace National Sports Centre in London, England.

== Summary ==
The Championships covered two days of competition. The marathon was held in Coventry and the decathlon was held in Birmingham.

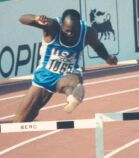
Ed Moses won the 400 metres hurdles

]

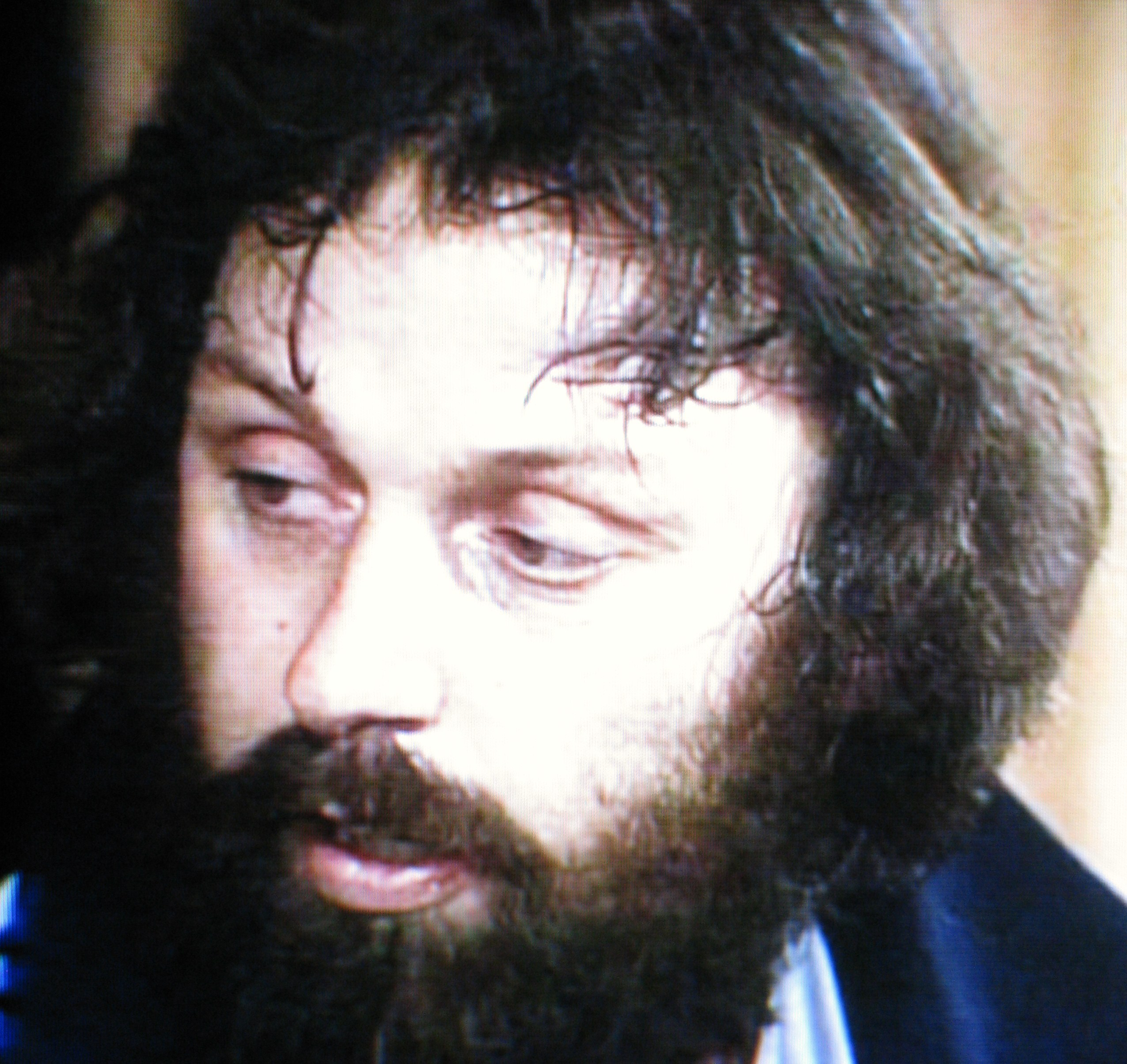
Geoff Capes won 7th shot put title

== Results ==
Event	Gold		Silver		Bronze	
100m	(United States) Clancy Edwards	10.35	Mike McFarlane	10.43	Eddie Cutting	10.46
200m	(United States) Clancy Edwards	20.77	Mike McFarlane	20.95	Ainsley Bennett	21.09
400m	(Sudan) Hassan El Kashief	45.82	Sebastian Coe	46.87	(Scotland) Roger Jenkins	47.01
800m	(United States) Steve Scott	1:47.29	(New Zealand) John Walker	1:47.53	Garry Cook	1:47.54
1,500m	Steve Ovett	3:39.08	(Scotland) Graham Williamson	3:39.27	(Scotland) John Robson	3:39.55
5,000m	(Republic of Ireland) Eamonn Coghlan	13:23.54	Mike McLeod	13:24.25	(New Zealand) Rod Dixon	13:24.61
10,000m	(Republic of Ireland) John Treacy	28:12.10	(United States) Alberto Salazar	28:12.39	Dave Murphy	28:12.42
marathon	Greg Hannon	2:13:06	Bernie Ford	2:14:15	(Greece) Michalis Kousis	2:19:42
3000m steeplechase	(Kenya) Hillary Tuwei	8:23.67	(Kenya) Amos Korir	8:28.98	Julian Marsay	8:29.46
110m hurdles	Mark Holtom	13.78w	Wilbert Greaves	13.91w	(Scotland) David Wilson	14.13w
400m hurdles	(United States) Ed Moses	48.58	(Australia) Peter Grant	50.07	Gary Oakes	50.37
3,000m walk	Roger Mills	12:09.07	(New Zealand) Mike Parker	12:22.76	Carl Lawton	12:37.69
10,000m walk	Brian Adams	43:48.4	Graham Morris	44:09.2	Amos Seddon	45:25.6
high jump	(Japan) Takao Sakamoto	2.15	Ossie Cham; Tim Foulger	2.15	n/a	
pole vault	(United States) Mike Tully	5.45	(Belgium) Patrick Desruelles	5.40	(United States) Ralph Haynie	5.30
long jump	(Belgium) Ronald Desruelles	7.95	Roy Mitchell	7.87	(Japan) Junichi Usui	7.80
triple jump	Keith Connor	15.87	(Japan) Masami Nakanishi	15.52	David Johnson	15.45
shot put	Geoff Capes	19.39	Mike Winch	17.29	Richard Slaney	16.67
discus throw	(United States) John Powell	61.50	(United States) Al Oerter	59.64	Richard Slaney	54.68
hammer throw	(Australia) Peter Farmer	70.16	Matt Mileham	64.40	Paul Dickenson	64.16
javelin throw	Simon Osborne	81.68	David Ottley	80.82	Peter Yates	80.62
decathlon	(Scotland) Brad McStravick	7569	Colin Boreham	7114	Mike Corden	7063

== See also ==
- 1979 WAAA Championships
