= 1983 AAA Championships =

Outdoor track and field competition

- Dates: 23–24 July 1983
- Host city: London, England
- Venue: Crystal Palace National Sports Centre
- Level: Senior
- Type: Outdoor

The 1983 AAA Championships sponsored by (Robinsons Barley Water) was the 1983 edition of the annual outdoor track and field competition organised by the Amateur Athletic Association (AAA). It was held from 23 to 24 July 1983 at the Crystal Palace National Sports Centre in London, England.

== Summary ==
The Championships covered two days of competition.

From 1983 the London Marathon would determine the marathon AAA champion.

The decathlon was held in Birmingham on 9 & 10 July 1983.

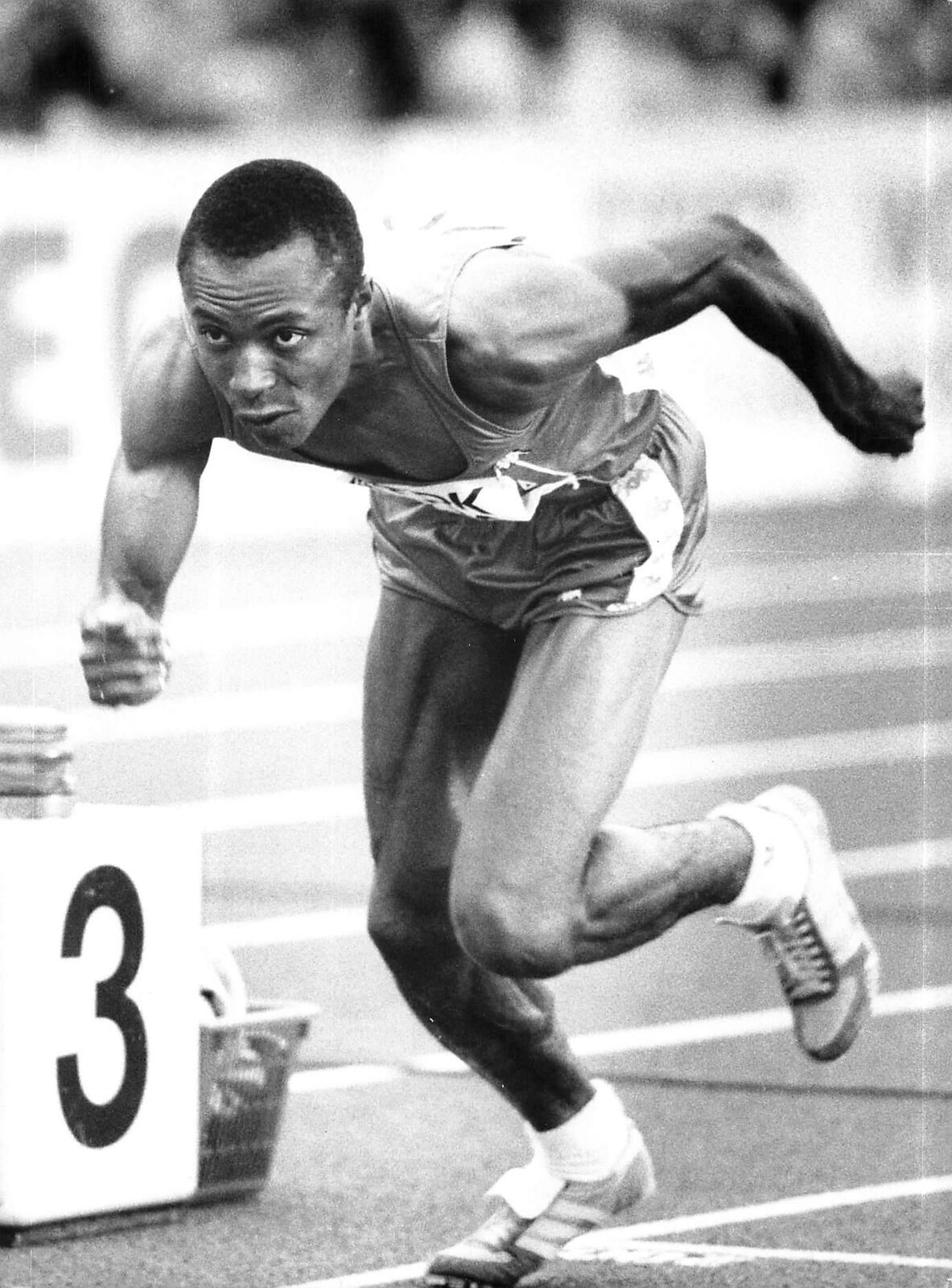
Calvin Smith won the 100 metres

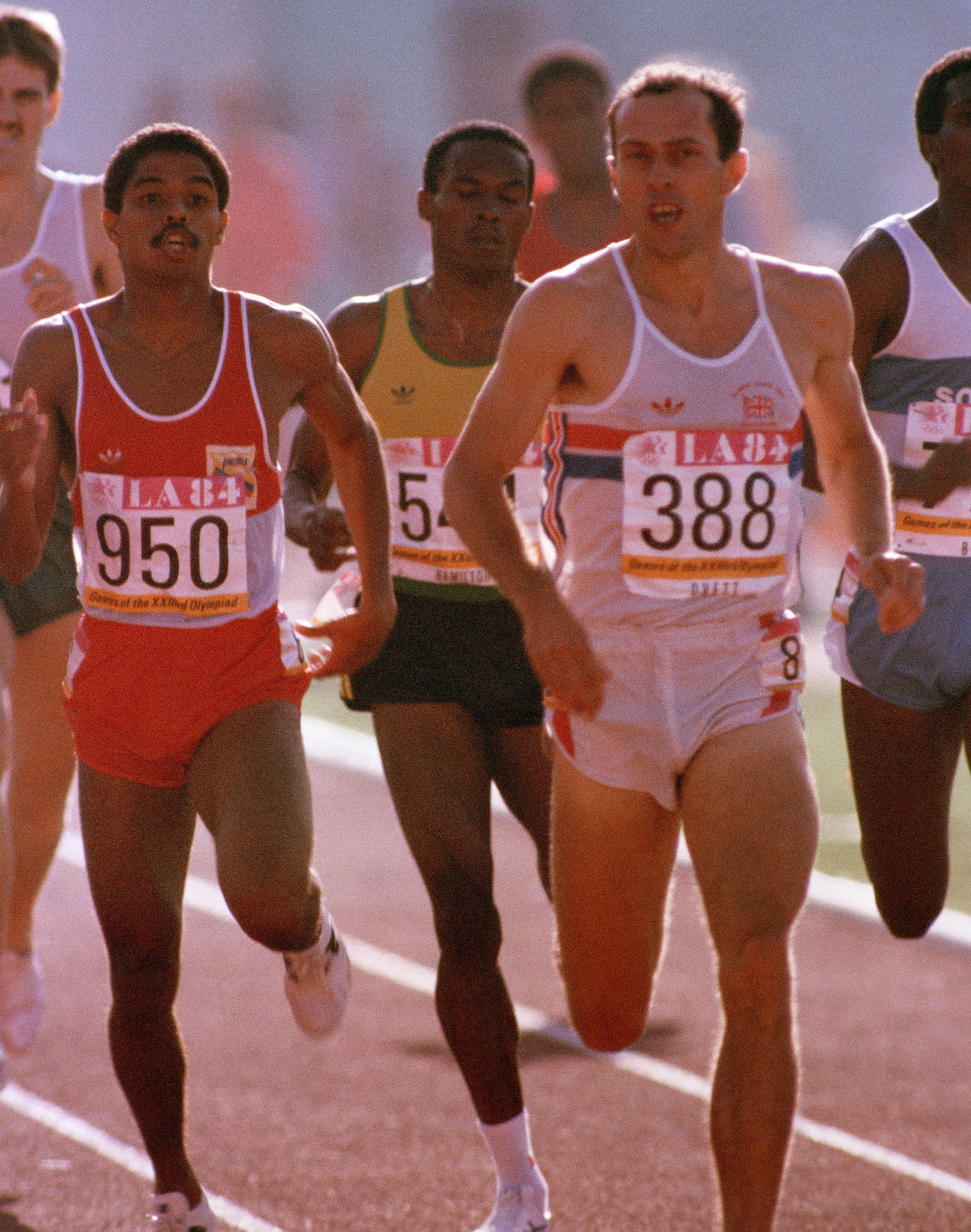
William Wuycke (left) won an AAA title for Venezuela

== Results ==
| Event | Gold | | Silver | | Bronze | |
|---|---|---|---|---|---|---|
| 100m | (United States) Calvin Smith | 10.30 | (Scotland) Allan Wells | 10.34 | (Australia) Paul Narracott | 10.43 |
| 200m | (United States) Mel Lattany | 20.61 | Donovan Reid | 21.00 | (Scotland) Cameron Sharp | 21.04 |
| 400m | (Australia) Darren Clark | 45.05 | (United States) Eddie Carey | 45.52 | (United States) Walter McCoy | 45.56 |
| 800m | (Venezuela) William Wuyke | 1:45.44 | Peter Elliott | 1:45.64 | Chris McGeorge | 1:46.57 |
| 1,500m | Steve Cram | 3:41.69 | Eamonn Martin | 3:44.03 | (Wales) Roger Hackney | 3:44.05 |
| 5,000m | Steve Harris | 13:38.63 | Dave Clarke | 13:41.07 | Steve Binns | 13:42.36 |
| 10,000m | Charlie Spedding | 28:08.12 | Geoff Smith | 28:11.37 | Allister Hutton | 28:13.96 |
| marathon | Mike Gratton | 2:09:43 | Gerry Helme | 2:10:12 | (Scotland) Jim Dingwall | 2:11:44 |
| 3000m steeplechase | Colin Reitz | 8:28.42 | Eddie Wedderburn | 8:30.02 | David Lewis | 8:32.79 |
| 110m hurdles | (United States) Tonie Campbell | 13.41 | (United States) Sam Turner | 13.50 | (United States) Marcus Allen | 13.86 |
| 400m hurdles | (United States) David Lee | 49.18 | Steve Sole | 49.95 | (Brunei) Ahmed Hamada | 50.23 |
| 3,000m walk | (Australia) Dave Smith | 11:36.04 | Phil Vesty | 11:48.03 | Roger Mills | 12:03.58 |
| 10,000m walk | (Wales) Steve Barry | 40:54.7 NR | Phil Vesty | 43:00.1 | Roy Sheppard | 43:18.3 |
| high jump | (United States) Leo Williams | 2.29 | (United States) Jim Howard | 2.29 | (Japan) Takao Sakamoto | 2.26 |
| pole vault | Jeff Gutteridge | 5.35 | Keith Stock | 5.20 | (Japan) Tomomi Takahashi | 5.20 |
| long jump | (United States) Mike Conley | 7.82 | Fred Salle | 7.56 | Derrick Brown | 7.52 |
| triple jump | (United States) Mike Conley | 16.49 | Eric McCalla | 16.10 | Vernon Samuels | 15.85 |
| shot put | (United States) Mike Carter | 20.80 | Mike Winch | 18.02 | Nick Tabor | 17.73 |
| discus throw | Bob Weir | 59.76 | Richard Slaney | 58.18 | Peter Gordon | 58.14 |
| hammer throw | (Scotland) Chris Black | 75.40 NR | Matt Mileham | 75.02 | Bob Weir | 72.48 |
| javelin throw | (New Zealand) Mike O'Rourke | 84.88 | David Ottley | 78.80 | Peter Yates | 77.90 |
| decathlon | (Republic of Ireland) Kevin Atkinson | 7353 | Ken Hayford | 7317 | Kevan Lobb | 7094 |

== See also ==
- 1983 WAAA Championships
