= 2002 AAA Championships =

- Dates: 12–14 July
- Host city: Birmingham, England
- Venue: Alexander Stadium
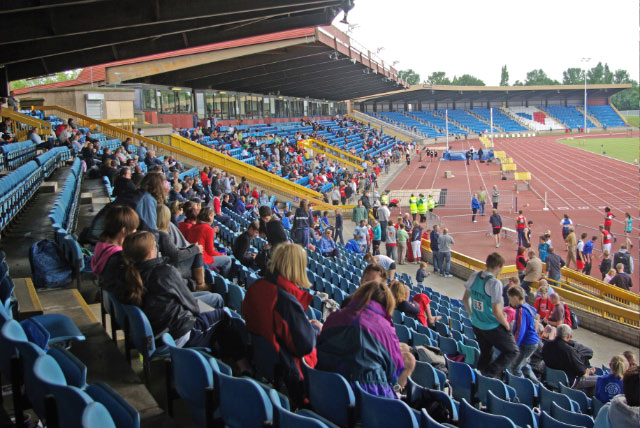
- Level: Senior
- Type: Outdoor

The 2002 AAA Championships sponsored by Norwich Union, was an outdoor track and field competition organised by the Amateur Athletic Association (AAA), held from 12 to 14 July at Alexander Stadium in Birmingham, England. It was considered the de facto national championships for the United Kingdom and was a qualifier for the 2002 European Athletics Championships.

== Medal summary ==
=== Men ===
Event	Gold		Silver		Bronze	
100m	Mark Lewis-Francis	10.06	Darren Campbell	10.11	Jason Gardener	10.13
200m (wind: 2.2 m/s)	Marlon Devonish	20.18 w	Darren Campbell	20.26 w	(Wales) Christian Malcolm	20.29 w
400m	(Wales) Tim Benjamin	45.73	Sean Baldock	45.84	Jared Deacon	45.89
800m	James McIlroy	1:50.09	Neil Speaight	1:50.71	(Scotland) Ally Donaldson	1:50.80
1,500m	Anthony Whiteman	3:38.24	John Mayock	3:38.97	Michael East	3:39.18
5,000m	Jon Wild	13:52.59	Rob Denmark	13:53.18	Matt Smith	13:53.47
10,000m	Rob Denmark	28:43.42	Jon Wild	28:43.82	(Wales) Andres Jones	28:43.93
110m hurdles	(Wales) Colin Jackson	13.40	Tony Jarrett	13.52	Damien Greaves	13.54
400m hurdles	Chris Rawlinson	48.68	Anthony Borsumato	48.90	(Wales) Matt Elias	49.79
3000m steeplechase	Ben Whitby	8:40.12	(Wales) Christian Stephenson	8:44.31	Pat Davoren	8:47.92
5000m walk	Steve Hollier	20:41.29	Don Bearman	21:55.07	Nathan Adams	23:11.68
high jump	Dalton Grant	2.20 m	Ben Challenger	2.20 m	(Republic of Ireland) Mark Mandy	2.10 m
pole vault	Nick Buckfield	5.35 m	Mark Davis	5.20 m	Christian North	5.20 m
long jump	(Scotland) Darren Ritchie	7.93 m	Chris Tomlinson	7.82 m	Mark Awanah	7.46 m
triple jump	Phillips Idowu	17.02 m	Tosin Oke	16.60 m	(Wales) Steven Shalders	16.09 m
shot put	Mark Proctor	18.54 m	Emeka Udechuku	17.19 m	Scott Rider	17.19 m
discus throw	Bob Weir	58.22 m	Glen Smith	56.38 m	Emeka Udechuku	56.28 m
hammer throw	Mick Jones	72.26 m	Paul Head	67.61 m	Mike Floyd	66.33 m
javelin throw	Mick Hill	77.86 m	Mark Roberson	74.23 m	Nick Nieland	73.20 m
decathlon	Adrian Hemery	6620 pts	James Lowery	6460 pts	Paul Tohill	6395 pts

=== Women ===
Event	Gold		Silver		Bronze	
100m	Joice Maduaka	11.31	Abi Oyepitan	11.42	Diane Allahgreen	11.44
200m (wind: 3.1 m/s)	Shani Anderson	23.03 w	Joice Maduaka	23.21 w	Ellena Ruddock	23.41 w
400m	(Scotland) Lee McConnell	51.59	(Wales) Catherine Murphy	52.10	Helen Karagounis	52.45
800m	(Scotland) Susan Scott	2:03.89	Jo Fenn	2:04.12	Emma Davies	2:05.52
1,500m	Kelly Holmes	4:06.02	Helen Pattinson	4:06.98	(Wales) Hayley Tullett	4:08.23
5,000m	Hayley Yelling	16:11.23	Catherine Dugdale	16:25.14	Debbie Sullivan	16:28.27
10,000m	Hayley Yelling	33:07.52	(Scotland) Gillian Palmer	33:09.70	(Scotland) Allison Higgins	33:32.07
100m hurdles	Diane Allahgreen	13.00	Julie Pratt	13.27	Rachel King	13.34
400m hurdles	Natasha Danvers	56.14	(Scotland) Sinead Dudgeon	56.88	Tracey Duncan	57.51
2000m steeplechase	Tara Krzywicki	6:31.77	Claire Entwistle	6:54.92	Ursula Counsell	7:04.94
5000m walk	Lisa Kehler	21:42.51	Sharon Tonks	24:05.49	(South Africa) Estlé Viljoen	24:26.11
high jump	Susan Jones	1.92 m	Debbie Marti	1.75 m	(Wales) Julie Crane	1.75 m
pole vault	Irie Hill	4.15 m	Tracey Bloomfield Rhian Clarke	4.05 m	Not awarded	
long jump	Jade Johnson	6.52 m	Sarah Claxton	6.17 m	Donita Benjamin	6.08 m
triple jump	Ashia Hansen	14.50 m	(Cuba) Yamilé Aldama	14.40 m	Michelle Griffith	13.18 m
shot put	Myrtle Augee	16.16 m	Julie Dunkley	15.89 m	Jo Duncan	15.71 m
discus throw	(Wales) Philippa Roles	56.32 m	Shelley Newman	54.08 m	Emma Carpenter	53.28 m
hammer throw	Lorraine Shaw	64.97 m	Liz Pidgeon	62.08 m	Zoe Derham	59.89 m
javelin throw	Kelly Morgan	64.87 m	Goldie Sayers	56.96 m	Karen Martin	56.34 m
heptathlon	Caroline Pearce	5108 pts	Kate Brewington	4971 pts	Maureen Knight	4593 pts
