= Athletics at the 1982 Commonwealth Games – Men's shot put =

Men's shot put at the Commonwealth Games

The men's shot put event at the 1982 Commonwealth Games was held on 9 October at the QE II Stadium in Brisbane, Australia.

== Results ==
Rank	Name	Nationality	#1	#2	#3	#4	#5	#6	Result	Notes
1st place, gold medalist(s)	Bruno Pauletto	Canada				19.55			19.55	
2nd place, silver medalist(s)	Mike Winch	England							18.25	
3rd place, bronze medalist(s)	Luby Chambul	Canada				17.46			17.46	
4	Richard Slaney	England							17.35	
5	Simon Rodhouse	England							17.18	
6	Matthew Barber	Australia							15.33	
7	Stephen Chikomo	Zimbabwe							13.72	
8	Christopher Pullen	Zimbabwe							13.45	
	Bishop Dolegiewicz	Canada							DNS	
