= List of British champions in shot put =

The British shot put athletics champions covers four competitions; the current British Athletics Championships which was founded in 2007, the preceding AAA Championships (1880–2006), the Amateur Athletic Club Championships (1866–1879) and finally the UK Athletics Championships which existed from 1977 until 1997 and ran concurrently with the AAA Championships.

Between 1977 and 1994, and again in 1997, two events effectively crowned national champions each year. The official UK Athletics Championships (not to be confused with the current championships, a rebranded British Athletics Championships) were specifically only open to British nationals and were organised by the national governing body. The AAA Championships continued, and due to their history, continued to be considered by both statisticians and athletes to be the more prestigious championships, with the exception of 1997 where the UK Championships were considered the principle championships for the only time. Winners at the UK Championships were nonetheless considered as having won a national title.

The UK Athletics Championships ceased to exist upon the insolvency of the governing body, the British Athletics Federation. The AAA championships continued until 2006, before they were replaced by the new British Athletics Championships.

+ Where an international athlete won the AAA Championships the highest ranking UK athlete is considered the National Champion in this list. Irish athletes originally represented Great Britain.

Tee most successful athletes in this event are Scott Lincoln, with eleven championship titles, and Judy Oakes, active during the dual championship era who won 18 titles in the AAA Championship continuity, and a further eleven UK Championships finals.

== Past winners ==
AAC Championships men's event only
Year	Men's champion
1866	Charles Fraser
1867	John Stone
1868	John Stone ^{(2)}
1869	Henry Leeke
1870	Robert Mitchell
1871	Robert Mitchell ^{(2)}
1872	Edward Bor
1873	Edward Bor ^{(2)}
1874	William Powell Moore
1875	Tom Stone
1876	Tom Stone ^{(2)}
1877	Tom Stone ^{(3)}
1878	William Winthrop
1879	Arthur East / William Winthrop ^{(2)}

AAA Championships men's event only
Year	Men's champion
1880	William Winthrop ^{(3)}
1881	Maurice Davin
1882	George Ross
1883	Owen Harte
1884	Owen Harte ^{(2)}
1885	Donald Mackinnon
1886	James Mitchel
1887	James Mitchel ^{(2)}
1888	James Mitchel+ ^{(3)}
1889	R. A. Greene & William Barry
1890	R. A. Greene ^{(2)}
1891	William Barry ^{(2)}
1892	William Barry ^{(3)}
1893	Denis Horgan
1894	Denis Horgan ^{(2)}
1895	Denis Horgan ^{(3)}
1896	Denis Horgan ^{(4)}
1897	Denis Horgan ^{(5)}
1898	Denis Horgan ^{(6)}
1899	Denis Horgan ^{(7)}
1900	Denis Horgan ^{(8)}
1901	NBA
1902	NBA
1903	Tom Nicolson
1904	Tom Nicolson ^{(2)}
1905	Tom Nicolson ^{(3)}
1906	Tom Kirkwood
1907	Tom Kirkwood ^{(2)}
1908	Tom Kirkwood ^{(3)}
1909	Tom Nicolson ^{(4)}
1910	Henry Alan Leeke
1911	D. McGregor
1912	Tom Nicolson ^{(5)}
1913	NBA
1914	Rex Woods
1919	Rex Woods ^{(2)}
1920	Rex Woods ^{(3)}
1921	Malcolm Nokes
1922	Rex Woods ^{(4)}

AAA Championships & WAAA Championships
Year	Men's champion	Year	Women's champion
1923	William Bradford	1923	Florence Birchenough
1924	Rex Woods ^{(5)}	1924	Mary Weston
1925	John Ross	1925	Mary Weston ^{(2)}
1926	Rex Woods ^{(6)}	1926	Florence Birchenough ^{(2)}
1927	Rex Woods ^{(7)}	1927	Florence Birchenough ^{(3)}
1928	Rex Woods ^{(8)}	1928	Mary Weston ^{(3)}
1929	Robert Howland	1929	Mary Weston ^{(4)}
1930	Robert Howland ^{(2)}	1930	Elsie Otway
1931	Kenneth Pridie	1931	Irene Phillips
1932	Robert Howland ^{(3)}	1932	Irene Phillips ^{(2)}
1933	Robert Howland ^{(4)}	1933	Kathleen Tilley
1934	Robert Howland ^{(5)}	1934	Kathleen Tilley ^{(2)}
1935	Robert Howland ^{(6)}	1935	Kathleen Tilley ^{(3)}
1936	Robert Howland ^{(7)}	1936	Kathleen Tilley ^{(4)}
1937	Robert Howland ^{(8)}	1937	Kathleen Tilley ^{(5)}
1938	Robert Howland ^{(9)}	1938	Bevis Reid
1939	Robert Howland ^{(10)}	1939	Bevis Reid ^{(2)}
1945	nc	1945	Kathleen Dyer
1946	Harold Moody	1946	Kathleen Dyer
1947	Harold Moody ^{(2)}	1947	Bevis Reid ^{(3)}
1948	Harold Moody ^{(3)}	1948	Bevis Reid ^{(4)}
1949	John Giles	1949	Bevis Shergold ^{(née Reid)} ^{(5)}
1950	John Savidge	1950	Joan Linsell
1951	John Savidge ^{(2)}	1951	Bevis Shergold ^{(6)}
1952	John Savidge ^{(3)}	1952	Joan Linsell
1953	John Savidge ^{(4)}	1953	Joan Linsell ^{(2)}
1954	John Savidge ^{(5)}	1954	Suzanne Allday
1955	Barclay Palmer	1955	Josephine Cook
1956	Barclay Palmer ^{(2)}	1956	Suzanne Allday ^{(2)}
1957	Arthur Rowe	1957	Josephine Cook ^{(2)}
1958	Arthur Rowe ^{(2)}	1958	Suzanne Allday ^{(3)}
1959	Arthur Rowe ^{(3)}	1959	Suzanne Allday ^{(4)}
1960	Arthur Rowe ^{(4)}	1960	Suzanne Allday ^{(5)}
1961	Arthur Rowe ^{(5)}	1961	Suzanne Allday ^{(6)}
1962	Martyn Lucking	1962	Suzanne Allday ^{(7)}
1963	Martyn Lucking ^{(2)}	1963	Suzanne Allday ^{(8)}
1964	Martyn Lucking ^{(3)}	1964	Mary Peters
1965	Alan Carter	1965	Mary Peters ^{(2)}
1966	Mike Lindsay	1966	Brenda Bedford
1967	Jeff Teale	1967	Brenda Bedford ^{(2)}
1968	Jeff Teale ^{(2)}	1968	Brenda Bedford ^{(3)}
1969	Jeff Teale ^{(3)}	1969	Brenda Bedford ^{(4)}
1970	Jeff Teale ^{(4)}	1970	Mary Peters ^{(3)}
1971	Geoff Capes	1971	Brenda Bedford ^{(5)}
1972	Geoff Capes ^{(2)}	1972	Brenda Bedford ^{(6)}
1973	Geoff Capes ^{(3)}	1973	Mary Peters ^{(4)}
1974	Geoff Capes ^{(4)}	1974	Brenda Bedford ^{(7)}
1975	Geoff Capes ^{(5)}	1975	Brenda Bedford ^{(8)}
1976	Geoff Capes ^{(6)}	1976	Janis Kerr

AAA Championships/WAAA Championships & UK Athletics Championships dual championships era 1977-1987
Year	AAA Men	Year	WAAA Women	Year	UK Men	UK Women
1977	Geoff Capes ^{(7)}	1977	Brenda Bedford ^{(9)}	1977	Geoff Capes	Venissa Head
1978	Geoff Capes ^{(8)}	1978	Angela Littlewood	1978	Geoff Capes ^{(2)}	Judy Oakes
1979	Geoff Capes ^{(9)}	1979	Judy Oakes	1979	Geoff Capes ^{(3)}	Angela Littlewood
1980	Geoff Capes ^{(10)}	1980	Judy Oakes ^{(2)}	1980	Mike Winch	Angela Littlewood ^{(2)}
1981	Mike Winch	1981	Angela Littlewood ^{(2)}	1981	Simon Rodhouse	Venissa Head ^{(2)}
1982	Mike Winch ^{(2)}	1982	Judy Oakes ^{(3)}	1982	Andy Vince	Judy Oakes ^{(2)}
1983	Mike Winch ^{(3)}	1983	Judy Oakes ^{(4)}	1983	Nick Tabor	Venissa Head ^{(3)}
1984	Mike Winch ^{(4)}	1984	Judy Oakes ^{(5)}	1984	Billy Cole	Judy Oakes ^{(3)}
1985	Billy Cole	1985	Judy Oakes ^{(6)}	1985	Billy Cole ^{(2)}	Judy Oakes ^{(4)}
1986	Billy Cole ^{(2)}	1986	Judy Oakes ^{(7)}	1986	Billy Cole ^{(3)}	Judy Oakes ^{(5)}
1987	Paul Edwards	1987	Judy Oakes ^{(8)}	1987	Carl Jennings	Judy Oakes ^{(6)}

AAA Championships & UK Athletics Championships dual championships era 1988-1997
Year	Men AAA	Women AAA	Year	Men UK	Women UK
1988	Simon Williams	Judy Oakes ^{(9)}	1988	Graham Savory	Judy Oakes ^{(7)}
1989	Simon Williams ^{(2)}	Myrtle Augee	1989	Paul Edwards	Judy Oakes ^{(8)}
1990	Paul Edwards ^{(2)}	Judy Oakes ^{(10)}	1990	Paul Edwards ^{(2)}	Myrtle Augee
1991	Paul Edwards ^{(3)}	Judy Oakes ^{(11)}	1991	Paul Edwards ^{(3)}	Judy Oakes ^{(9)}
1992	Paul Edwards ^{(4)}	Judy Oakes ^{(12)}	1992	Paul Edwards ^{(4)}	Judy Oakes ^{(10)}
1993	Matt Simson	Myrtle Augee ^{(2)}	1993	Paul Edwards ^{(5)}	Myrtle Augee ^{(2)}
1994	Paul Edwards ^{(5)}	Judy Oakes ^{(13)}	n/a		
1995	Mark Proctor	Judy Oakes ^{(14)}	n/a		
1996	Matt Simson ^{(2)}	Judy Oakes ^{(15)}	n/a		
1997	Stephan Hayward	Judy Oakes ^{(16)}	1997	Shaun Pickering	Judy Oakes ^{(11)}

AAA Championships second era 1998-2006
Year	Men's champion	Women's champion
1998	Mark Proctor ^{(2)}	Judy Oakes ^{(17)}
1999	Mark Proctor ^{(3)}	Myrtle Augee ^{(3)}
2000	Stephan Hayward ^{(2)}	Judy Oakes ^{(18)}
2001	Mark Proctor ^{(4)}	Jo Duncan
2002	Mark Proctor ^{(5)}	Myrtle Augee ^{(4)}
2003	Carl Myerscough	Jo Duncan ^{(2)}
2004	Carl Myerscough ^{(2)}	Julie Dunkley
2005	Carl Myerscough ^{(3)}	Julie Dunkley ^{(2)}
2006	Carl Myerscough ^{(4)}	Julie Dunkley ^{(3)}

British Athletics Championships 2007 to present
Year	Men's champion	Women's champion
2007	Carl Myerscough ^{(5)}	Eva Massey
2008	Carl Myerscough ^{(6)}	Jo Duncan ^{(3)}
2009	Carl Myerscough ^{(7)}	Eden Francis
2010	Carl Myerscough ^{(8)}	Eden Francis ^{(2)}
2011	Carl Myerscough ^{(9)}	Eden Francis ^{(3)}
2012	Carl Myerscough ^{(10)}	Eden Francis ^{(4)}
2013	Greg Beard	Rachel Wallader
2014	Scott Rider	Eden Francis ^{(5)}
2015	Scott Lincoln	Rachel Wallader ^{(2)}
2016	Scott Lincoln ^{(2)}	Rachel Wallader ^{(3)}
2017	Scott Lincoln ^{(3)}	Rachel Wallader ^{(4)}
2018	Scott Lincoln ^{(4)}	Amelia Strickler
2019	Scott Lincoln ^{(5)}	Sophie McKinna
2020	Scott Lincoln ^{(6)}	Sophie McKinna ^{(2)}
2021	Scott Lincoln ^{(7)}	Sophie McKinna ^{(3)}
2022	Scott Lincoln ^{(8)}	Adele Nicoll
2023	Scott Lincoln ^{(9)}	Adele Nicoll ^{(2)}
2024	Scott Lincoln ^{(10)}	Amelia Campbell ^{(2)}
2025	Scott Lincoln ^{(11)}	Adele Nicoll ^{(3)}
2026	Scott Lincoln ^{(12)}	Serena Vincent

- NBA = No British athlete in medal placings
- nc = not contested
