= 2006 AAA Championships =

- Host city: Manchester, England
- Venue: Manchester Regional Arena
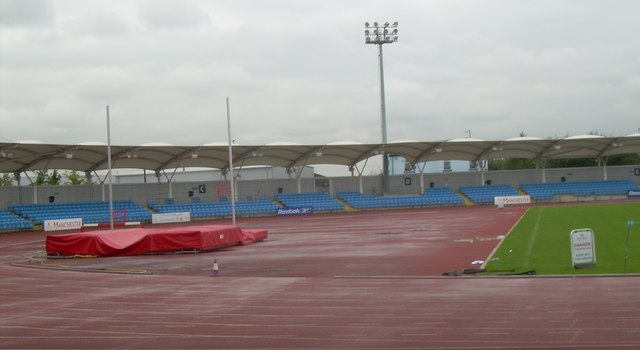
- Level: Senior
- Type: Outdoor

The 2006 AAA Championships was an outdoor track and field competition organised by the Amateur Athletic Association (AAA), held from 15 to 16 July at the Manchester Regional Arena in Manchester, England. It was considered the de facto national championships for the United Kingdom.

It was the final major edition of the long-running competition, as it was replaced by the UK Athletics-organised British Athletics Championships the following year. This signalled a move away from the English AAA-led management of the sport, in favour of a centralised, national and elite-focused championships.

== Medal summary ==
=== Men ===
Event	Gold		Silver		Bronze	
100m	Marlon Devonish	10.19	Tyrone Edgar	10.23	Mark Lewis-Francis	10.28
200m	Marlon Devonish	20.69	Rikki Fifton	20.69	Somto Eruchie	20.79
400m	(Wales) Tim Benjamin	46.00	Martyn Rooney	46.20	Robert Tobin	46.35
800m	Michael Rimmer	1:47.20	Sam Ellis	1:47.49	Tim Bayley	1:47.98
1,500m	Andrew Baddeley	3:41.18	Stephen Davies	3:42.52	Neil Speaight	3:43.17
5,000m	Peter Riley	13:46.68	Mo Farah	13:49.15	Nick McCormick	13:52.26
10,000m	Dominic Bannister	29:31.26	Dave Mitchinson	29:56.14	Gareth Raven	30:00.25
110m hurdles (wind: +2.7 m/s)	Andy Turner	13.24 w	William Sharman	13.45 w	(Scotland) Allan Scott	13.73 w
400m hurdles	(Wales) Rhys Williams	49.28	(Wales) Dai Greene	50.00	Matthew Douglas	50.09
3000m steeplechase	Jermaine Mays	8:39.95	Adam Bowden	8:40.23	Stuart Stokes	8:42.41
5000m walk	(Republic of Ireland) Colin Griffin	19:43.40	(Republic of Ireland) Jamie Costin	19:54.72	Dominic King	21:21.16
high jump	Martyn Bernard	2.25 m	Germaine Mason	2.22 m	Tom Parsons Nick Stanisavljevic	2.19 m
pole vault	Steven Lewis	5.40 m	(Wales) Scott Simpson	5.30 m	Paul Walker	5.15 m
long jump	Greg Rutherford	8.26 m	Chris Tomlinson	7.87 m	Nathan Morgan	7.84 m
triple jump	Phillips Idowu	17.50 m	Nathan Douglas	16.99 m	Tosin Oke	16.33 m
shot put	Carl Myerscough	20.00 m	(Australia) Chris Gaviglio	17.81 m	Chris Gearing	17.12 m
discus throw	Carl Myerscough	61.04 m	Emeka Udechuku	58.72 m	(Australia) Chris Gaviglio	55.76 m
hammer throw	Andy Frost	69.15 m	Mike Floyd	68.54 m	Simon Bown	66.77 m
javelin throw	Nick Nieland	80.56 m	David Parker	72.39 m	Neil McLellan	71.19 m
decathlon	Dean Showler-Davis	7146 pts	Edward Dunford	6916 pts	James Wright	6906 pts

=== Women ===
Event	Gold		Silver		Bronze	
100m	Joice Maduaka	11.23	Anyika Onuora	11.39	Montell Douglas	11.57
200m	Joice Maduaka	23.24	Emily Freeman	23.53	(Republic of Ireland) Joanne Cuddihy	23.57
400m	Nicola Sanders	50.74	(Scotland) Gemma Nicol	53.46	Lesley Owusu	53.63
800m	Rebecca Lyne	2:00.31	Jemma Simpson	2:00.49	Amanda Pritchard	2:00.55
1,500m	Helen Clitheroe	4:09.64	Lisa Dobriskey	4:10.36	Katrina Wootton	4:12.01
5,000m	Joanne Pavey	15:07.38	Hayley Yelling	15:30.25	Liz Yelling	15:50.92
10,000m	Hayley Yelling	32:38.24	Wendy Jones	34:01.75	Morag McDonnell	34:06.03
100m hurdles (wind: +2.5 m/s)	Sarah Claxton	13.19 w	Sara McGreavy	13.26 w	Gemma Bennett	13.33 w
400m hurdles	Natasha Danvers-Smith	55.58	(Scotland) Lee McConnell	55.82	(Republic of Ireland) Michelle Carey	56.68
3000m steeplechase	Hattie Dean	9:52.04	(Republic of Ireland) Fionnuala Britton	9:53.44	Jo Ankier	9:58.22
5000m walk	(Republic of Ireland) Ann Loughnane	22:54.97	Johanna Jackson	23:27.56	Fiona McGorum	28:42.19
high jump	(Republic of Ireland) Deirdre Ryan	1.92 m	(Wales) Julie Crane	1.86 m	Jessica Ennis Stephanie Pywell	1.82 m
pole vault	Ellie Spain	4.21 m	Kate Dennison	3.95 m	Irie Hill	3.80 m
long jump	Kelly Sotherton	6.51 m	Jade Johnson	6.32 m	Sarah Claxton	6.28 m
triple jump	(United States) Tiombé Hurd	14.15 m	Ashia Hansen	13.65 m	Nadia Williams	13.27 m
shot put	Julie Dunkley	16.08 m	(Northern Ireland) Eva Massey	15.59 m	Jo Duncan	15.50 m
discus throw	Claire Smithson	56.15 m	Kara Sharpe	55.21 m	Emma Carpenter	54.28 m
hammer throw	(Republic of Ireland) Eileen O'Keeffe	65.62 m	(Scotland) Shirley Webb	63.57 m	(Wales) Lesley Brannan	62.45 m
javelin throw	Goldie Sayers	58.81 m	Jo Blair	50.48 m	Laura Whittingham	50.22 m
heptathlon	Katia Lannon	5071 pts	Grace Clements	5039 pts	Leanne Buxton	4825 pts
