= Masters W55 pole vault world record progression =

This is the progression of world record improvements in the pole vault W55 division of Masters athletics.

Key

Incomplete information Pending Indoor mark

Height	Athlete	Nationality	Birthdate	Age	Location	Date	Ref
3.30 m i	Irie Hill	Great Britain	16 January 1969	55 years, 64 days	Toruń	20 March 2024	
3.26 m	Dawn Hartigan	Australia	13 November 1956	56 years, 130 days	Melbourne	23 March 2013	
3.20 m	Dawn Hartigan	Australia	13 November 1956	55 years, 145 days	Melbourne	6 April 2012	
3.08 m	Kay Glynn	United States	5 February 1953	55 years, 138 days	Los Gatos	22 June 2008	
3.05 m	Phil Raschker	United States	21 February 1947	55 years, 114 days	Murfreesboro	15 June 2002	
2.56 m	Joy MacDonald	United States	25 January 1941	56 years, 70 days	Naples	5 April 1997	
