= Masters W50 pole vault world record progression =

This is the progression of world record improvements of the pole vault W50 division of Masters athletics.

Key

Incomplete information Pending Indoor mark

Height	Athlete	Nationality	Birthdate	Age	Location	Date	Ref
3.46	Irie Hill	Great Britain	16 January 1969	50 years, 255 days	Holzgerlingen	28 September 2019	
3.41	Irie Hill	Great Britain	16 January 1969	50 years, 119 days	Waiblingen	15 June 2019	
3.51 i	Irie Hill	Great Britain	16 January 1969	50 years, 73 days	Holzgerlingen	30 March 2019	
3.40	Dawn Hartigan	Australia	13 November 1956	50 years, 113 days	Coburg	6 March 2007	
3.38	Phil Raschker	United States	21 February 1947	52 years, 241 days	Orlando	20 October 1999	
2.90	Patricia McNab	Great Britain	25 February 1943	50 years, 101 days	Southampton	6 June 1993	
