= 1981 AAA Championships =

Outdoor track and field competition

- Dates: 7–8 August 1981
- Host city: London, England
- Venue: Crystal Palace National Sports Centre
- Level: Senior
- Type: Outdoor

The 1981 AAA Championships sponsored by Nationwide was the 1981 edition of the annual outdoor track and field competition organised by the Amateur Athletic Association (AAA). It was held from 7 to 8 August 1981 at the Crystal Palace National Sports Centre in London, England.

== Summary ==
The Championships covered two days of competition. The marathon was held in Rugby and the decathlon was held in Birmingham.

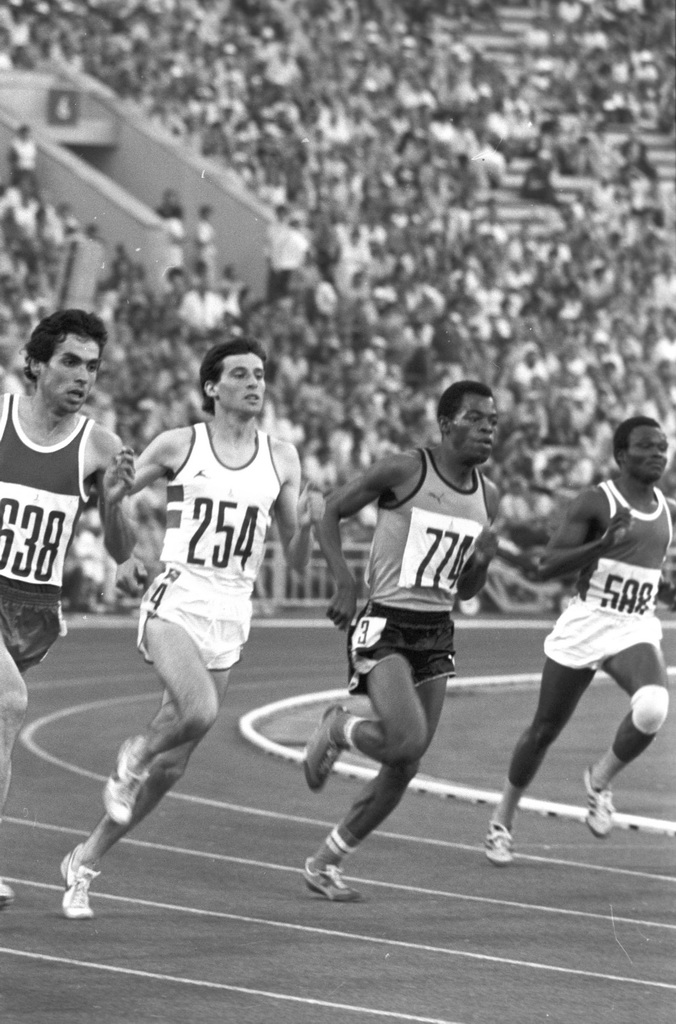
Sebastian Coe

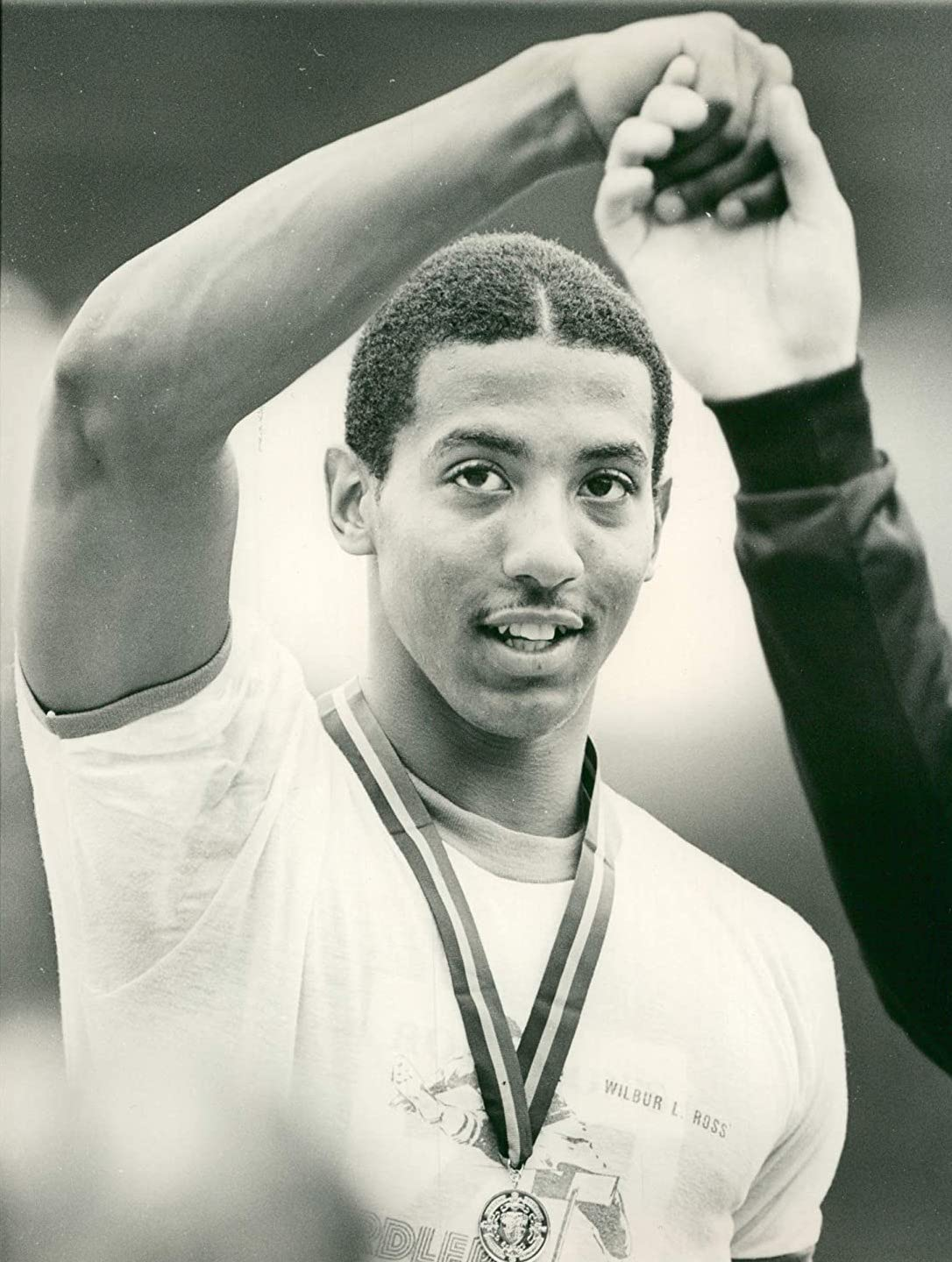
Renaldo Nehemiah

== Results ==
Event	Gold		Silver		Bronze	
100m	(United States) Mel Lattany	10.24	(Ghana) Ernest Obeng	10.27	(Scotland) Drew McMaster	10.45
200m	(United States) Stanley Floyd	20.51	(United States) Fred Taylor	20.76	Mike McFarlane	20.92
400m	(United States) Tony Darden	45.11	(United States) Walter McCoy	45.42	Garry Cook	46.25
800m	Sebastian Coe	1:45.41	(Sudan) Omer Khalifa	1:46.75	Chris McGeorge	1:47.02
1,500m	Steve Cram	3:36.82	(Scotland) John Robson	3:37.42	(United States) Craig Masback	3:37.54
5,000m	(Republic of Ireland) Eamonn Coghlan	13:20.36	(New Zealand) John Walker	13:20.89	(United States) Steve Plasencia	13:25.96
10,000m	Barry Smith	28:06.13	Geoff Smith	28:08.07	(Wales) Steve Jones	28:10.83
marathon	Hugh Jones	2:14:07	Andy Holden	2:16:04	Mike Gratton	2:16:40
3000m steeplechase	(United States) Ken Martin	8:29.25	Graeme Fell	8:31.80	(United States) Kelly Jensen	8:33.37
110m hurdles	(United States) Renaldo Nehemiah	13.17	(United States) Tonie Campbell	13.72	Mark Holtom	13.75
400m hurdles	Gary Oakes	49.69	(United States) James King	49.88	(United States) David Lee	50.77
3,000m walk	Roger Mills	11:44.68 NR	Phil Vesty	12:17.96	Brian Adams	12:40.87
10,000m walk	(Wales) Steve Barry	43:22.4	(New Zealand) Mike Parker	44:11.3	Ian McCombie	44:38.2
high jump	(United States) James Frazier	2.23	Mark Naylor	2.20	(United States) Benn Fields	2.20
pole vault	(United States) Earl Bell	5.50	(United States) Brad Pursley	5.35	Keith Stock	5.20
long jump	(United States) Larry Myricks	8.38	Roy Mitchell	7.60	(United States) Arnie Robinson	7.44
triple jump	Aston Moore	16.66	Conroy Brown	15.61	Frank Attoh	15.58
shot put	Mike Winch	18.36	Simon Rodhouse	18.14	Tony Zaidman	17.07
discus throw	(United States) John Powell	62.46	(United States) Al Oerter	61.88	(United States) Art Burns	61.58
hammer throw	Martin Girvan	68.98	Bob Weir	67.52	David Smith	59.00
javelin throw	(New Zealand) Mike O'Rourke	83.72	(United States) Bruce Kennedy	80.60	David Ottley	79.36
decathlon	Colin Boreham	7639	Pan Zeniou	7558	(Scotland) Brad McStravick	7479

== See also ==
- 1981 WAAA Championships
