= Jorge Reyna =

Cuban triple jumper (born 1963)

Personal information
- Nationality: Cuban
- Born: 10 January 1963 (age 62)

Sport
- Sport: Athletics
- Event: Triple jump

Jorge Reyna (born 10 January 1963) is a retired male triple jumper from Cuba who won a silver medal at the 1989 World Indoor Championships in Budapest.

His personal best jump was 17.48 metres, achieved in February 1987 in Santiago de Cuba. This result places him sixth on the all-time Cuban performers list, behind Yoelbi Quesada, Lázaro Betancourt, Aliecer Urrutia, Yoandri Betanzos and Alexander Martínez.

Balcindes finished third behind fellow Cubans Lázaro Betancourt and Lázaro Balcindes in the triple jump event at the British 1984 AAA Championships.

== Achievements ==
Year	Competition	Venue	Position	Event	Notes
Representing Cuba
1982	Central American and Caribbean Games	Havana, Cuba	3rd	Triple jump	16.61 m
1983	Central American and Caribbean Championships	Havana, Cuba	1st	Triple jump	16.95 m
1983	Pan American Games	Caracas, Venezuela	1st	Triple jump	17.05 m
1986	Ibero-American Championships	La Habana, Cuba	2nd	Triple jump	16.25 m
1987	Pan American Games	Indianapolis, United States	6th	Triple jump	16.36 m (w)
1989	World Indoor Championships	Budapest, Hungary	2nd	Triple jump	17.41 m
1989	Central American and Caribbean Championships	San Juan, Puerto Rico	1st	Triple jump	17.12 m
