= Joanne Duncan =

Joanne Duncan is the name of:

- Joanne Duncan (politician) (born 1959), Australian politician
- Joanne Duncan (athlete) (born 1966), English shot putter
