= Athletics at the 1985 Summer Universiade – Men's triple jump =

The men's triple jump event at the 1985 Summer Universiade was held at the Kobe Universiade Memorial Stadium in Kobe on 31 August and 2 September 1985.

== Medalists ==
Gold	Silver	Bronze
Charles Simpkins; United States	Aleksandr Yakovlev; Soviet Union	John Herbert; Great Britain

== Results ==
=== Qualification ===
Rank	Group	Athlete	Nationality	Result	Notes
1	?	Aleksandr Yakovlev	Soviet Union	17.08	
2	?	John Herbert	Great Britain	16.97	
3	?	Francisco Albino dos Santos	Brazil	16.96	PB
4	?	Khristo Markov	Bulgaria	16.72	
5	?	Charles Simpkins	United States	16.68	
6	?	Abcélvio Rodrigues	Brazil	16.57	
7	?	Lázaro Balcindes	Cuba	16.45	
8	?	Marios Hadjiandreou	Cyprus	16.40	
9	?	Francis Dodoo	Ghana	16.30	
10	?	Larry Streeter	United States	16.27	
11	?	Tian Hongxin	China	16.25	
12	?	Norifumi Yamashita	Japan	16.19	
13	?	Park Young-jun	South Korea	16.18	
14	?	Paul Emordi	Nigeria	16.16	
15	?	Dimitrios Mikhas	Greece	16.13	
16	?	George Wright	Canada	15.92	
17	?	Waldemar Golanko	Poland	15.83	
18	?	Takao Sato	Japan	15.71	
19	?	Edrick Floréal	Canada	15.67	
20	?	Klaus Kübler	West Germany	15.66	
21	?	Mauricio Carranza	El Salvador	13.82	
22	?	Richard Duval	Mauritius	13.49	

=== Final ===
Rank	Athlete	Nationality	Result	Notes
1st place, gold medalist(s)	Charles Simpkins	United States	17.86	UR
2nd place, silver medalist(s)	Aleksandr Yakovlev	Soviet Union	17.43	
3rd place, bronze medalist(s)	John Herbert	Great Britain	17.41	
4	Khristo Markov	Bulgaria	17.05	
5	Francisco Albino dos Santos	Brazil	16.95	
6	Lázaro Balcindes	Cuba	16.67	
7	Norifumi Yamashita	Japan	16.62	
8	Tian Hongxin	China	16.35	
9	Marios Hadjiandreou	Cyprus	16.13	
10	Larry Streeter	United States	16.04	
11	Abcélvio Rodrigues	Brazil	16.00	
12	Francis Dodoo	Ghana	15.99	
