= Masters W45 pole vault world record progression =

This is the progression of world record improvements of the pole vault W45 division of Masters athletics.

Key

Incomplete information Pending

Height	Athlete	Nationality	Birthdate	Age	Location	Date	Ref
3.76 m	Irie Hill	Great Britain	16 January 1969	46 years, 168 days	Regensburg	3 July 2015	
3.65 m	Irie Hill	Great Britain	16 January 1969	46 years, 139 days	Freienbach	4 June 2015	
3.62 m	Irie Hill	Great Britain	16 January 1969	45 years, 197 days	Mössingen	1 August 2014	
3.50 m	Brigitte van de Kamp	Netherlands	15 June 1960	46 years, 10 days	Lisse	25 June 2006	
3.50 m	Carla Forcellini	Italia	7 November 1959	45 years, 189 days	Rome	15 May 2005	
3.50 m	Dawn Hartigan	Australia	13 November 1956	45 years, 126 days	Melbourne	19 March 2002	
3.38 m	Phil Raschker	United States	21 February 1947	47 years, 85 days	Atlanta	17 May 1994	
