= Myra Nimmo =

British long jumper and academic (born 1954)

Personal information
- Nationality: British (Scottish)
- Born: 5 January 1954 (age 72) Edinburgh, Scotland
- Occupations: Long jumper, Academic
- Years active: 1972–76 (long jumper); 1993– (academic)
- Employer: University of Birmingham
- Website: www.birmingham.ac.uk/staff/profiles/biosciences/nimmo-myra.aspx

Academic background
- Education: University of Glasgow School of Veterinary Medicine

Academic work
- Discipline: Physiology
- Sub-discipline: Exercise physiology
- Institutions: University of Strathclyde; Loughborough University; University of Birmingham

Achievements and titles
- Olympic finals: 1976
- Commonwealth finals: 1974
- Personal best: 6.43 m
- Updated on 29 January 2017

Myra Alexandra Nimmo (born 5 January 1954) is a Scottish athlete and academic, who currently works at the University of Birmingham. As an athlete, she competed at the 1974 British Commonwealth Games and 1976 Summer Olympics in the long jump, and was the Scottish long jump record holder from 1973 until 2012. From 2016 until 2021, she was the Chair of England Athletics.

== Athletics career ==
Nimmo began her career in the sprint hurdles, and also ran in the relay team. She took up long jump during the winter of 1972–73. In June 1973, Nimmo broke the Scottish national long jump record with a jump of 6.43 m during a meeting at Meadowbank Stadium. Her record became the longest standing Scottish national athletics record, until it was broken in 2012 by the unrelated Jade Nimmo.

Nimmo became the British long jump champion after winning the British WAAA Championships title at the 1973 WAAA Championships.

Nimmo competed in the 1974 Commonwealth Games in Christchurch, New Zealand, where she came fourth in the long jump. Later in the year, she won a long jump event in Cwmbran, Wales. Nimmo was the only Scottish women to win an event at the meeting.

In 1975, she regained the WAAA long jump title at the 1975 WAAA Championships and won another event in Coatbridge, Scotland, in what became her last appearance for Scotland. Nimmo competed at the 1976 Summer Olympics in Montreal, Canada, finishing 24th with a best jump of 5.94 m.

== Academic career ==
Nimmo has a PhD in exercise physiology from the University of Glasgow School of Veterinary Medicine. In 1993, Nimmo became an exercise physiologist at the University of Strathclyde. In 2007, she was appointed Professor of Exercise Physiology at Loughborough University's School of Sport and Exercise Sciences. She later became the Pro-Vice-Chancellor and Head of College of Life and Environmental Sciences at the University of Birmingham. In 2016, Nimmo was appointed the Chair of England Athletics. In January 2021, Nimmo announced that she would not be standing for re-election, but would stay Chair of England Athletics until a successor is found. On 1 September 2021, Nimmo was replaced by Gary Shaughnessy in the role.
