= Dawn Hartigan =

Australian pole vaulter

Dawn Hartigan (born 13 November 1956) is an Australian pole vaulter. She is the current world record holder in the W45, W50 and W55 divisions of masters athletics. She also held the world record in the W40 division.

She lives in Melbourne and works as a personal trainer, also doing motivational speaking engagements. She is the author of the 2003 book "Power with age : in reach of everyone." She also penned a section of the Sandy Forster edited "Living an Abundant Life: Inspirational Stories from Entrepreneurs Around the World" entitled "Finding my True Spirit."

She was the 2013 female nominee for the IAAF Masters Athlete of the Year.
