= Francisco dos Santos (athlete) =

Personal information
- Full name: Francisco Albino dos Santos Filho
- Born: 24 April 1960 (age 66)
- Height: 1.88 m (6 ft 2 in)
- Weight: 76 kg (168 lb)

Sport
- Sport: Athletics
- Event: Triple jump

Francisco Albino dos Santos Filho (born 24 April 1960) is a retired Brazilian athlete who specialised in the triple jump. He represented his country at the 1987 World Championships without qualifying for the final.

His personal best in the event is 16.96 metres set in Kobe in 1985.

== International competitions ==
Year	Competition	Venue	Position	Event	Notes
Representing Brazil
1983	Pan American Games	Caracas, Venezuela	5th	Triple jump	16.03 m
1985	Universiade	Kobe, Japan	5th	Triple jump	16.95 m
1985	South American Championships	Santiago, Chile	1st	Triple jump	16.87 m
1987	Pan American Games	Indianapolis, United States	7th	Triple jump	16.19 m (w)
1987	World Championships	Rome, Italy	24th (q)	Triple jump	15.85 m
1990	Ibero-American Championships	Manaus, Brazil	2nd	Triple jump	16.11 m
