= Rex Woods (athlete) =

English shot putter

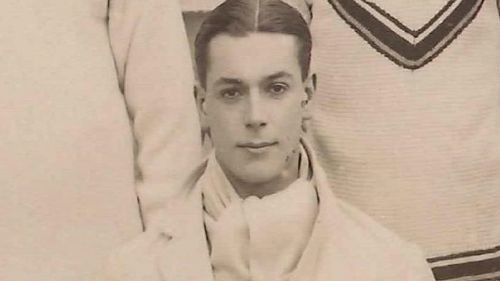
- Woods at Cambridge, circa 1912

Personal information
- Born: 15 October 1891 Dulwich, South London, England
- Died: 21 September 1986 (aged 94) Cambridge, England

Sport
- Sport: Athletics
- Event: Shot put
- Club: University of Cambridge AC; Achilles Club

Reginald ('Rex') Salisbury Woods MD, FRCS, (15 October 1891 – 21 September 1986) was a British track and field athlete who represented Great Britain in three Olympic Games.

== Early life ==
Reginald Salisbury Woods was born at Dulwich to Henry Thomas Woods and Lilian (née Salisbury), sister of the portrait painter Frank O. Salisbury. He was educated at Dulwich College. From there he won an exhibition to Downing College, Cambridge, where he excelled academically and gained a first class tripos and from where he won a senior university entrance scholarship to St George's Hospital. After graduating in medicine in 1916, he won a research scholarship at St George's. He fulfilled a number of house appointments at St George's and eventually became a surgical registrar at the hospital. In 1918, he married Irene Charlotte, daughter of Thomas Pickering, of Tyneholme, Newcastle, and The Hill House, Gilsland, Cumberland. Irene was a nurse at St George's, and served as a controller (equivalent to a colonel) in the Auxiliary Territorial Service until being invalided out in 1945; from 1954 to 1967, she organised the City of Cambridge Women's Royal Voluntary Service, and was awarded the Territorial Decoration and appointed C.B.E. in 1947. They had a son and two daughters. Their son, Thomas Pickering Salisbury Woods, M.B.E., of Manor Court, Cambridge, was a Major in the Royal Artillery. His son, by his wife Patricia, Robert, married Hon. Lorna Suzanna Katherine, daughter of Simon Maxwell, 13th Baron Farnham.

== Athletics ==
Rex Woods competed in the shot put for Cambridge vs. Oxford four times (1912–14, 1920) and was the winner on the last two occasions. His first attempt at the AAA Championships was in 1912 when he finished fourth. Woods first represented Britain at the shot put at the Olympic Games whilst president of the Cambridge University Athletic Club. Standing 6 ft 0 in (183 cm) and weighing 172 pounds (78 kg), Woods was not large by later standards for a shot putter. He later became honorary treasurer of the Cambridge University Athletic Club from 1919 to 1939, and was chairman from 1939 to 1952. He became the National shot put champion, after winning the AAA Championships title in 1924 and 1926 and represented Great Britain at the Olympic Games in 1924 and 1928. His last appearance at the AAA championships was in 1928 when he finished second. During his involvement with athletics at Cambridge he managed the Oxford/ Cambridge athletic tours of the United States from 1925 to 1949. Aside from the University of Cambridge, he was also affiliated to the Achilles Club.

In other sport he came close to winning a rugby blue and he captained the public schools past and present rugby football team in 1919 and was a noted golfer even celebrating his 90th birthday by achieving a hole in one. Woods was also an excellent quarter-miler and in 1913 he beat the 1912 Olympic runner Ernest Haley.

== Military ==
The First World War interrupted his medical career at St George's but he became a captain in the Royal Army Medical Corps and was twice mentioned in dispatches whilst serving in the British Expeditionary Force. He again served in the RAMC during the Second World War at the rank of major and surgeon specialist to the East African Command.

== Later life ==
Aside from his early years at St George's and his distinguished service in the RAMC, Rex was connected with medicine at Cambridge for 75 years. There he shared a medical practice with Edward Bevan, the Olympic rowing gold medalist. In his obituary Woods was remembered as: "always seemingly imperturbable, and his friendliness and concern for his patients were a byword. For those with athletic interests who were injured in the pursuit of their aims he was particularly uplifting and reassuring. He was a first class doctor with an all pervading interest in medicine and surgery, and his life was a model of integrity and kinship."

Rex Woods died in Cambridge on 21 September 1986.
