= Barclay Palmer =

British athlete (1932–2020)

Personal information
- Nationality: British (English)
- Born: 2 March 1932 Toronto, Canada
- Died: 27 September 2020 (aged 88) Brunswick, Maine, United States
- Height: 198 cm (6 ft 6 in)
- Weight: 107 kg (236 lb)

Sport
- Sport: Athletics
- Event: shot put / discus
- Club: Oxford University AC; Achilles Club

William Barclay Livingstone Palmer (2 March 1932 – 27 September 2020) was a Canadian born, British athlete who competed in the shot put discipline at the 1956 Summer Olympics.

== Biography ==
Palmer was born in Toronto, Canada, the son of an Anglican minister, but was educated at Monkton Combe School in Somerset. As a child he had degenerative disease in his leg and ankle and was an early recipient of Penicillin.

Palmer completed National Service from 1950 to 1952 before going to St Peter's College, Oxford, where he studied theology. He gained an Athletics Blue in 1953 for shot put (then called weights), discus and javelin.

Palmer became the British shot put champion after winning the British AAA Championships title at the 1955 AAA Championships and retained the title the following year at the 1956 AAA Championships.

Later that year he represented Great Britain at the 1956 Olympic Games in Melbourne, finishing 12th in the shot put competition. Returning from the Olympics he stopped at New York and became interested in jazz. He emigrated to the United States and taught at various schools in Pennsylvania, Connecticut, and New York.
