= Lázaro Balcindes =

Cuban triple jumper (born 1963)

Personal information
- Nationality: Cuban
- Born: 8 February 1963 (age 63)

Sport
- Sport: Athletics
- Event: Triple jump
Medal record
Representing Cuba
IAAF World Indoor Games
Bronze medal – third place	1985 Paris	Triple jump

Lázaro Balcindes García (born 8 February 1963) is a Cuban former track and field athlete who specialised in the triple jump.

A perennial minor medallist, his first podium finishes were in 1982, when he was runner-up to Lester Benjamin at the CAC Junior Championships then two centimetres short of victory behind Oscar Harris at the Pan American Junior Championships.

This theme continued into his senior career, with silver medals at the Central American and Caribbean Championships in Athletics in both 1983 and 1985 (behind fellow Cuban Jorge Reyna then Bahamian Steve Hanna). A Cuban trio of Reyna, Balcindes and Lázaro Betancourt travelled to England to compete at the 1984 AAA Championships and secured all three top spots, with Balcindes being second to Betancourt.

He competed twice at the global level: he was a bronze medallist for Cuba at the 1985 IAAF World Indoor Games and later sixth place at the 1985 IAAF World Cup, representing the Americas team.

Balcindes finished second behind fellow Cuban Lázaro Betancourt in the triple jump event at the British 1984 AAA Championships.

== International competitions ==
Year	Competition	Venue	Position	Notes
1982	CAC Junior Championships	Bridgetown, Barbados	2nd	15.67 m
1982	Pan American Junior Championships	Barquisimeto, Venezuela	2nd	15.98 m
1983	CAC Championships	Havana, Cuba	2nd	16.58 m
1985	World Indoor Games	Paris, France	3rd	16.83 m
1985	CAC Championships	Nassau, Bahamas	2nd	16.80 m
1985	World Cup	Canberra, Australia	6th	16.74 m w
1986	CAC Games	Santiago, Dominican Republic	5th	16.32 m
