= Masters W40 pole vault world record progression =

This is the progression of world record improvements of the pole vault W40 division of Masters athletics.

Key

Incomplete information Pending Better indoor record

Height	Athlete	Nationality	Birthdate	Age	Location	Date	Ref
4.15 m	Carolin Hingst	Germany	18 September 1980	42 years, 245 days	Diefflen	21 May 2023	
4.60 m	Jennifer Suhr	United States	4 February 1982	40 years, 78 days	Natchitoches	23 April 2022	
4.50 m	Jennifer Suhr	United States	4 February 1982	40 years, 57 days	Waco	2 April 2022	
4.10 m	Doris Auer	Austria	10 May 1971	40 years, 88 days	Innsbruck	6 August 2011	
3.90 m	Irie Hill	Great Britain	16 January 1969	43 years, 213 days	Zittau	16 August 2012	
3.85 m	Irie Hill	Great Britain	16 January 1969	41 years, 186 days	Nyíregyháza	21 July 2010	
3.60 m	Larissa Lowe	Netherlands	19 August 1963	40 years, 249 days	Kingston	24 April 2004	
3.60 m i	Carla Forcellini	Italy	7 November 1959	44 years, 126 days	Sindelfingen	12 March 2004	
3.60 m i	Larissa Lowe	Netherlands	19 August 1963	40 years, 206 days	Sindelfingen	12 March 2004	
3.50 m	Alison Davies	Great Britain	6 April 1961	41 years, 98 days	Birmingham	13 July 2002	
3.50 m	Dawn Hartigan	Australia	13 November 1956	44 years, 126 days	Melbourne	19 March 2001	
3.20 m	Marie Claire Lejeune Fabardine	France	11 June 1955	41 years, 4 days	Aix les Bains	15 June 1996	
3.00 m	Phil Raschker	United States	21 February 1947	44 years, 135 days	Naperville	6 July 1991	
