= Athletics at the 1983 Pan American Games – Men's triple jump =

Men's triple jump at the Pan American Games

The men's triple jump event at the 1983 Pan American Games was held in Caracas, Venezuela on 27 August.

== Results ==
Rank	Name	Nationality	Result	Notes
1st place, gold medalist(s)	Jorge Reyna	Cuba	17.05	
2nd place, silver medalist(s)	Lázaro Betancourt	Cuba	16.75	
3rd place, bronze medalist(s)	José Salazar	Venezuela	16.26	
4	Dave Siler	United States	16.11	
5	Francisco dos Santos	Brazil	16.03	
6	Francisco Pichott	Chile	14.39	
7	Paget Spencer	Antigua and Barbuda	14.10	
	Lester Benjamin	Antigua and Barbuda	NM	
	Mike Marlow	United States	DNS	
	Steve Hanna	Bahamas	DNS	
