= 1984 AAA Championships =

Outdoor track and field competition

- Dates: 23–24 June 1984
- Host city: Birmingham, England
- Venue: Alexander Stadium
- Level: Senior
- Type: Outdoor

The 1984 AAA Championships sponsored by (U-Bix) was the 1984 edition of the annual outdoor track and field competition organised by the Amateur Athletic Association (AAA). It was held from 23 to 24 June 1984 at the Alexander Stadium in Birmingham, England.

== Summary ==
The Championships were held at the Alexander Stadium for the first time and covered two days of competition.

The 1984 London Marathon determined the marathon champion.

The decathlon was held in Hendon on 14 & 15 July 1984.

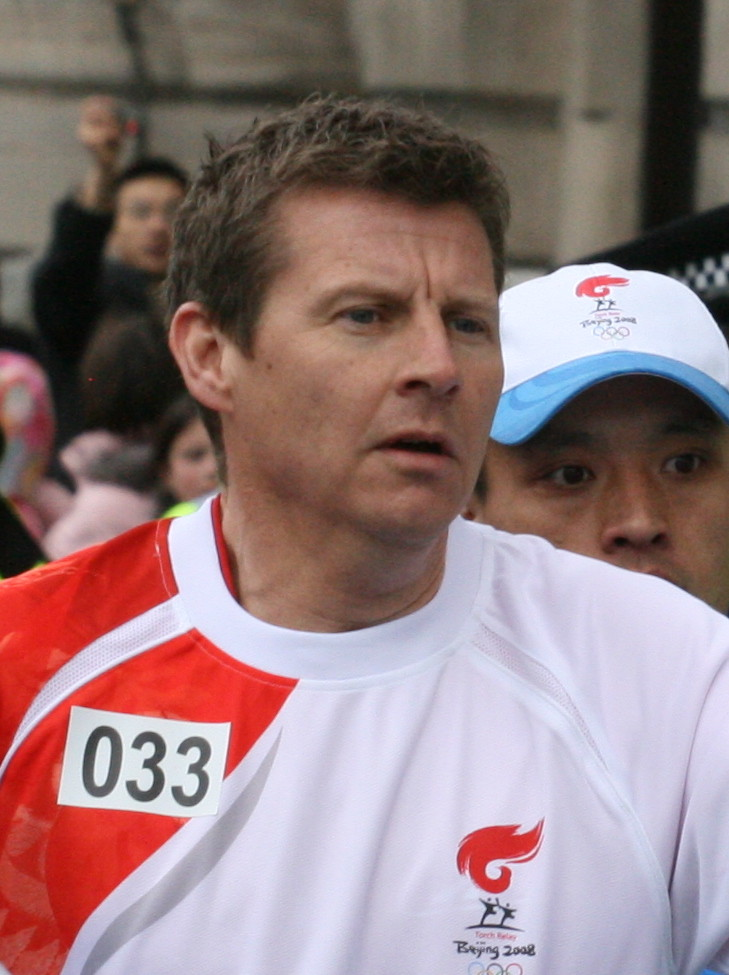
Steve Cram won another middle-distance title

== Results ==
Event	Gold		Silver		Bronze	
100m	Donovan Reid	10.42	Linford Christie	10.48	Eddie Cutting	10.49
200m	Todd Bennett	20.79	Buster Watson	20.93	Lincoln Asquith	21.10
400m	(Australia) Darren Clark	45.66	(Ivory Coast) Gabriel Tiacoh	45.81	(Trinidad and Tobago) Mike Paul	45.88
800m	Steve Cram	1:46.84	Rob Harrison	1:46.90	(United States) James Mays	1:46.91
1,500m	Peter Elliott	3:39.66	Sebastian Coe	3:39.79	Eamonn Martin	3:41.00
5,000m	(Republic of Ireland) Ray Flynn	13:19.52	Nick Rose	13:22.00	Tim Hutchings	13:26.11
10,000m	(Wales) Steve Jones	28:09.97	Mike McLeod	28:16.87	Julian Goater	28:17.62
marathon	Charlie Spedding	2:09:57	Kevin Forster	2:11:41	(Wales) Dennis Fowles	2:12:12
3000m steeplechase	(Spain) Domingo Ramón	8:23.12	Paul Davies-Hale	8:24.07	Graeme Fell	8:25.46
110m hurdles	(Wales) Nigel Walker	13.78	Wilbert Greaves	14.03	Hughie Teape	14.17
400m hurdles	Martin Gillingham	50.24	Gary Oakes	50.47	Steve Sole	50.70
3,000m walk	Phil Vesty	11:42.94 NR	Tim Berrett	11:54.23	Roger Mills	12:13.56
10,000m walk	Ian McCombie	41:33.0	Martin Rush	42:54.3	Steve Johnson	43:38.6
high jump	(Cuba) Francisco Centelles	2.30	(Cuba) Javier Sotomayor	2.30	(Cuba) Jorge Alfaro	2.26
pole vault	Jeff Gutteridge	5.40	Brian Hooper	5.20	Keith Stock	5.20
long jump	Fred Salle	7.59	David Burgess	7.58	John Herbert	7.55
triple jump	(Cuba) Lázaro Betancourt	16.93	(Cuba) Lázaro Balcindes	16.80	(Cuba) Jorge Reyna	16.74
shot put	Mike Winch	18.39	(Australia) Phil Nettle	16.93	(Republic of Ireland) Paul Quirke	16.92
discus throw	Bob Weir	62.50	(The Bahamas) Brad Cooper	60.60	(Australia) Paul Nandapi	60.40
hammer throw	David Smith	72.40	Bob Weir	71.76	Paul Dickenson	70.24
javelin throw	David Ottley	81.34	Marcus Humphries	76.48	Peter Yates	76.24
decathlon	(Republic of Ireland) Kevin Atkinson	7451	Ken Hayford	7431	(Republic of Ireland) Brendan Curtin	7129

== See also ==
- 1984 WAAA Championships
