= Abcélvio Rodrigues =

Brazilian triple jumper

Personal information
- Born: 26 May 1957 (age 69) Rio de Janeiro, Brazil
- Height: 1.81 m (5 ft 11 in)
- Weight: 74 kg (163 lb)

Sport
- Sport: Athletics
- Event: Triple jump

Abcélvio Rodrigues (born 26 May 1957) is a Brazilian athlete. He competed in the men's triple jump at the 1984 Summer Olympics and the 1988 Summer Olympics.

== International competitions ==
Year	Competition	Venue	Position	Event	Notes
Representing Brazil
1984	Olympic Games	Los Angeles, United States	16th (q)	Triple jump	16.12 m
1985	Universiade	Kobe, Japan	11th	Triple jump	16.00 m
1987	South American Championships	São Paulo, Brazil	2nd	Triple jump	16.11 m
1988	Ibero-American Championships	Mexico City, Mexico	5th	Triple jump	16.35 m
1988	Olympic Games	Seoul, South Korea	35th (q)	Triple jump	15.13 m
1989	South American Championships	Medellín, Colombia	2nd	Triple jump	16.48 m
