= Roy Cruttenden =

British long jumper (1925–2019)

Personal information
- Nationality: British (English)
- Born: 18 February 1925 Brighton, England
- Died: 3 June 2019 (aged 94) Brighton, England
- Height: 183 cm (6 ft 0 in)
- Weight: 73 kg (161 lb)

Sport
- Sport: Athletics
- Event: long jump
- Club: Brighton AC

Arthur Roy Cruttenden (18 February 1925 – 3 June 2019) was a British long jumper who competed at the 1956 Summer Olympics.

== Biography ==
Born in Brighton, Cruttenden became an accomplished sprinter and quarter-miler before taking up long jump. His sport was interrupted by World War II during which he served in the Royal Engineers for 1944-1945.

Cruttenden finished second behind Harry Askew in the long jump event at the 1950 AAA Championships and then finished second again behind Sylvanus Williams at both the 1951 AAA Championships and 1952 AAA Championships. However, because he was the best placed British athlete he was considered the British long jump champion.

Cruttenden finally won an AAA title outright in 1956 and later that year represented Great Britain at the 1956 Olympic Games in Melbourne. Cruttenden retained his title at the 1957 AAA Championships.

He was selected for the England athletics team in the long jump at the 1958 British Empire and Commonwealth Games in Cardiff, Wales, where he finished in fifth place overall.

Later he moved to Gibraltar serving with the Royal Navy.
