= 1999 AAA Championships =

British athletics event

- Dates: 23–25 July
- Host city: Birmingham, England
- Venue: Alexander Stadium
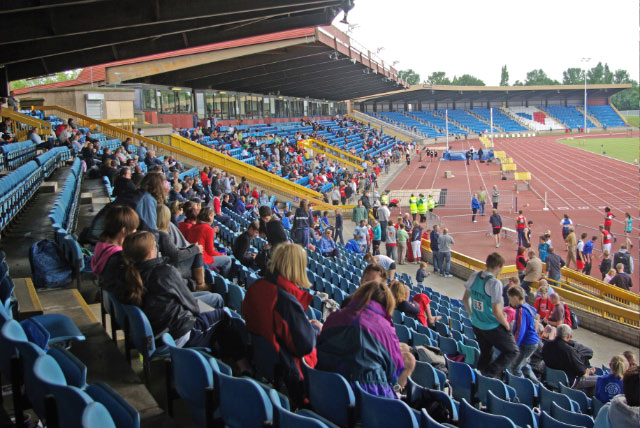
- Level: Senior
- Type: Outdoor

The 1999 AAA Championships sponsored by CGU, was an outdoor track and field competition organised by the Amateur Athletic Association (AAA), held from 23 to 25 July at Alexander Stadium in Birmingham, England. It was considered the de facto national championships for the United Kingdom and doubled up as the qualifiers for the 1999 World Championships in Athletics.

== Medal summary ==
=== Men ===
Event	Gold		Silver		Bronze	
100m (wind: +2.3 m/s)	Jason Gardener	10.02 w	Dwain Chambers	10.07 w	Darren Campbell	10.18 w
200m (wind: +2.4 m/s)	Julian Golding	20.20 w	Marlon Devonish	20.36 w	(Wales) Doug Turner	20.55 w
400m	(Wales) Jamie Baulch	45.36	Solomon Wariso	45.52	Mark Hylton	45.99
800m	Mark Sesay	1:48.03	Jason Lobo	1:48.69	Curtis Robb	1:48.70
1,500m	John Mayock	3:39.12	Neil Caddy	3:40.83	(Scotland) Jon McCallum	3:41.92
3,000m	Andrew Graffin	8:07.58	Nick Comerford	8:08.13	Allen Graffin	8:10.42
5,000m	Rob Denmark	13:34.17	Keith Cullen	13:36.49	Matt O'Dowd	13:37.00
10,000m	Paul Evans	28:34.62	Dave Taylor	29:00.04	Richard Nerurkar	29:06.69
110m hurdles (wind: +2.1 m/s)	(Wales) Colin Jackson	13.24 w	Damien Greaves	14.00 w	Lloyd Cowan	14.12 w
400m hurdles	Chris Rawlinson	49.62	(Wales) Paul Gray	49.94	Anthony Borsumato	50.00
3000m steeplechase	(Wales) Christian Stephenson	8:44.42	Craig Wheeler	8:47.83	Stuart Stokes	8:50.40
10,000m walk	Andi Drake	42:14.69	Chris Cheeseman	44:27.54	(Scotland) Jamie O'Rawe	45:36.58
high jump	Steve Smith	2.28 m	(Scotland) Tony Gilhooly Stuart Ohrland (South Africa) Tyron Peacock	2.17 m	Not awarded	
pole vault	Kevin Hughes	5.50	Mike Edwards Ben Flint	5.40 m	Not awarded	
long jump	Steve Phillips	7.79 m	Stuart Wells	7.50 m	Darren Thompson	7.45 m
triple jump	Larry Achike	16.73 m w	Julian Golley	16.66 m	Francis Agyepong	16.52 m
shot put	Mark Proctor	17.83 m	(Scotland) Steph Hayward	17.13 m	(Wales) Lee Newman	16.49 m
discus throw	Bob Weir	61.35 m	Glen Smith	59.25 m	(Wales) Lee Newman	58.08 m
hammer throw	Mick Jones	74.25 m	Bill Beauchamp	72.63 m	Paul Head	70.91 m
javelin throw	Steve Backley	87.59 m	Nick Nieland	81.83 m	Mark Roberson	80.23 m
decathlon	(Wales) Paul Jones	6922 pts	Steve Garland	6565 pts	Liam Collins	6472 pts

=== Women ===
Event	Gold		Silver		Bronze	
100m	Joice Maduaka	11.37	Christine Bloomfield	11.42	Marcia Richardson	11.49
200m	Joice Maduaka	22.83	Christine Bloomfield	22.85	Shani Anderson	23.22
400m	Katharine Merry	50.62	Helen Frost	52.43	Michelle Thomas	52.59
800m	Kelly Holmes	1:59.86	Tanya Blake	2:04.04	Ann Griffiths	2:04.41
1,500m	(Wales) Hayley Tullett	4:08.06	Helen Pattinson	4:08.71	Tanya Baker	4:21.82
3,000m	Jilly Ingman	9:28.21	(Scotland) Sheila Fairweather	9:45.32	(Scotland) Susan Scott	9:51.71
5,000m	(Scotland) Hayley Haining	15:56.59	Sarah Young	16:02.66	Birhan Dagne	16:04.75
10,000m	Bev Jenkins	33:58.81	Angie Joiner	34:23.01	Debbie Sullivan	34:30.16
100m hurdles (wind: +2.3 m/s)	Keri Maddox	12.97 w	Diane Allahgreen	13.05 w	Angie Thorp	13.33 w
400m hurdles	(Scotland) Sinead Dudgeon	55.24	Keri Maddox	55.55	Natasha Danvers	56.18
5,000m walk	Vicky Lupton	23:37.47	Catherine Charnock	23:42.92	Lisa Crump	24:26.41
high jump	Jo Jennings-Steele	1.87 m	(Scotland) Gillian Black	1.83 m	Susan Jones	1.83 m
pole vault	Janine Whitlock	4.25 m	Irie Hill	3.85 m	Tracey Bloomfield Paula Wilson	3.65 m
long jump	Joanne Wise	6.62 m	Denise Lewis	6.50 m	Sarah Claxton	6.30 m
triple jump	Michelle Griffith	13.41 m	Anna-Maria Thorpe	12.70 m	Liz Patrick	12.47 m
shot put	Myrtle Augee	17.32 m	Julie Dunkley	16.16 m	Jo Duncan	15.91 m
discus throw	Shelley Drew	55.16 m	(Wales) Philippa Roles	54.55 m	Emma Merry	51.43 m
hammer throw	Lyn Sprules	62.62 m	Lorraine Shaw	62.02 m	Rachael Beverley	58.99 m
javelin throw	Kirsty Morrison	55.70 m	Karen Martin	55.55 m	(Scotland) Lorna Jackson	55.01 m
heptathlon	Katherine Livesey	4851 pts	(Scotland) Kirsty Roger	4723 pts	(Scotland) Jackie Tindal	4705 pts
