= Athletics at the 1987 Pan American Games – Men's triple jump =

Men's triple jump at the Pan American Games

The men's triple jump event at the 1987 Pan American Games was held in Indianapolis, United States on 10 August.

== Results ==
Rank	Name	Nationality	#1	#2	#3	#4	#5	#6	Result	Notes
1st place, gold medalist(s)	Mike Conley Sr.	United States	17.31w	17.18	17.30	x	x	x	17.31w	
2nd place, silver medalist(s)	Willie Banks	United States	x	16.26	16.87w	16.87w	x	16.51	16.87w	
3rd place, bronze medalist(s)	Frank Rutherford	Bahamas	x	x	16.68w	x	–	–	16.68w	
4	Edrick Floréal	Canada	16.55w	16.45	x	x	–	x	16.55w	
5	Steve Hanna	Bahamas	15.95	15.94	16.22	16.47	–	–	16.47	
6	Jorge Reyna	Cuba	x	16.28	16.36w	16.29	x	16.17	16.36w	
7	Francisco dos Santos	Brazil	16.19	16.00	15.65	15.69	–	x	16.19w	
8	Ernesto Torres	Puerto Rico	15.81	15.71	x	15.71	15.87	15.75	15.87	
9	José Quiñaliza	Ecuador	15.40	x	15.62				15.62	
10	Devon Hyde	Belize	14.91	14.72	14.62				14.91	NR
11	Ricardo Valiente	Peru	14.78	14.87	13.32				14.87	
12	Edward Cruden	Suriname	14.26	14.72	14.38				14.72	
