= Lee Newman =

Welsh male athlete

Personal information
- Nationality: British (Welsh)
- Born: 1 May 1973 (age 52)

Sport
- Sport: Athletics
- Event: shot put / discus
- Club: Blackheath Harriers

Lee Jon Newman (born 1 May 1973) is a Welsh male former athlete who competed in the shot put and discus events.

== Biography ==
Newman has personal best distances of 18.85 metres and 60.48 metres respectively in these events. Newman was National record holder in the discus for more than a decade.

Newman competed in the discus event at the 1998 Commonwealth Games in Kuala Lumpur, Malaysia finishing 7th and competed in both the discus and shot put events at the 2002 Commonwealth Games in Manchester, England, finishing 8th and 11th respectively.

He has won three bronze medals at AAA Championships, two in the shot put in 1994 and 1999 and one in the discus in 1999.

Newman coached his then wife, Shelley Newman (nee Drew) to the Olympic Games in Discus in 2004. After retiring from sports, Newman built a successful career in Private Equity running multi-national companies.
