= Robert Howland =

British shot putter (1905–1986)

Personal information
- Born: 25 March 1905 Berkhampstead, England
- Died: 7 March 1986 (aged 80) Saffron Walden, England

Sport
- Sport: Athletics
- Event: Shot put
- Club: University of Cambridge AC; Achilles Club
Medal record
Men's Athletics
Representing England
British Empire Games
Silver medal – second place	1930 Hamilton	Shot Put
Silver medal – second place	1934 London	Shot Put

Robert Leslie Howland (25 March 1905 – 7 March 1986) was an English track and field athlete who competed in the shot put. He represented Great Britain in the 1928 Summer Olympics.

== Biography ==
He was born in Berkhamsted and died in Saffron Walden. In 1928, he finished 20th the Olympic shot put event.

At the 1930 British Empire Games he won the silver medal in the shot put competition. Four years later at the 1934 British Empire Games he won again the silver medal in the shot put contest.

Howland medalled ten times between 1929 and 1939 in the shot put event at the prestigious AAA Championships.

He became a senior tutor and professor of Classics at St. John's College, Cambridge, England.
