= Simon Rodhouse =

English shot putter (1955–1983)

Personal information
- Nationality: British (English)
- Born: 20 April 1955 Southampton, England
- Died: 24 February 1983 (aged 27) England

Sport
- Sport: Athletics
- Event: Shot put
- Club: Southampton Athletic Club

Simon Dominic Rodhouse (20 April 1955 – 24 February 1983) was an English male athlete.

== Biography ==
Rodhouse was a member of the Southampton Athletic Club and became the British shot put champion after winning the 1981 UK Athletics Championships in the shot put. He also finished second behind Mike Winch in the shot put event at both the 1981 AAA Championships and the 1982 AAA Championships.

He represented England in the shot put, at the 1982 Commonwealth Games in Brisbane, Australia.

He was a PE and French teacher at St Mary's College in Southampton and was killed in a car crash (driving his V8 MGB GT) when returning home from an indoor athletics meeting at RAF Cosford on 24 February 1983.
