= Julie Dunkley =

English shot putter (born 1979)

Personal information
- Nationality: British (English)
- Born: 11 September 1979 (age 46) Dartford, Kent, England

Sport
- Sport: Athletics
- Event: shot put
- Club: Shaftesbury Barnet Harriers

Julie Dunkley (born 11 September 1979) is an English female former athlete who competed in the women's shot put. She has a personal best distance of 16.40 metres.

== Biography ==
Dunkley, a member of Shaftesbury Barnet Harriers, finished second behind Myrtle Augee in the shot put event at the 1999 AAA Championships and continued to podium for four consecutive years; second in 2000 behind Judy Oakes, second behind Jo Duncan in 2001 and second to Augee again in 2002.

Dunkley represented England at the 2002 Commonwealth Games in Manchester, finishing 7th, and was third behind Jo Duncan at the 2003 AAAs.

Dunkley finally became the British shot put champion after winning the British AAA Championships title at the 2004 AAA Championships and proceeded to win twice more at the 2005 AAA Championships and 2006 AAA Championships.

Dunkley represented England at the 2006 Commonwealth Games in Melbourne, finishing 10th.

Dunkley was also a two-time National indoor champion, winning two indoor titles in 2001 and 2006.
