= Sue Hearnshaw =

British long jumper

Personal information
- Nationality: British (English)
- Born: 26 May 1961 (age 65) Liversedge, West Yorkshire, England
- Height: 178 cm (5 ft 10 in)
- Weight: 67 kg (148 lb)

Sport
- Sport: Athletics
- Event: long jump
- Club: Hull Spartan
Medal record
Women's athletics
Representing Great Britain
Olympic Games
Bronze medal – third place	1984 Los Angeles	Long jump
Summer Universiade
Silver medal – second place	1981 Bucharest	4x100m relay

Susan Christina Richardson (née Hearnshaw, formerly Telfer, born 26 May 1961) is a British retired athlete who competed mainly in the long jump and won a bronze medal at the 1984 Summer Olympics.

== Biography ==
Hearnshaw, born in Liversedge, West Yorkshire, graduated from Loughborough University. Her mother, Muriel Pletts, had competed in the first post-war Summer Olympic Games in London in 1948, finishing fourth as part of the British women's 4 × 100 metre relay team.

Hearnshaw represented England in the long jump event, at the 1978 Commonwealth Games in Edmonton, Canada and the following year became the British long jump champion after winning the British WAAA Championships title at the 1979 WAAA Championships.

Hearnshaw represented England again in the long jump event, at the 1982 Commonwealth Games in Brisbane, Australia.

Hearnshaw achieved her legal best in the long jump with 6.83 metres on 6 May 1984. She also jumped a wind-assisted 7.00 metres when winning the UK Championship title on 27 May 1984. Soon afterwards Hearnshaw regained the WAAA title at the 1984 WAAA Championships.

Additionally in 1984, she won the European Indoor title and competed for Great Britain at the 1984 Olympic Games held in Los Angeles, in the long jump, where she won a bronze medal. Her long jump best of 6.83 metres in 1984, ranks her eighth on the UK all-time list.

She subsequently qualified as a Chartered Accountant.

== International competitions ==
Year	Competition	Venue	Position	Event	Notes
Representing Great Britain / England
1977	European Junior Championships	Donetsk, Soviet Union	12th	Long jump	5.54 m
1978	Commonwealth Games	Edmonton, Canada	4th	Long jump	6.40 m
1978	European Championships	Prague, Czechoslovakia	16th (q)	Long jump	6.25 m
1979	European Junior Championships	Bydgoszcz, Poland	3rd	Long jump	6.46 m
1980	Olympic Games	Moscow, Soviet Union	9th	Long jump	6.50 m
1981	Universiade	Bucharest, Romania	5th	Long jump	6.53 m
1981	Universiade	Bucharest, Romania	2nd	4 × 100 m	43.86
1982	Commonwealth Games	Brisbane, Australia	5th	Long jump	6.50 m
1984	European Indoor Championships	Gothenburg, Sweden	1st	Long jump	6.70 m
1984	Olympic Games	Los Angeles, United States	3rd	Long jump	6.80 m (w)
(q) Indicates overall position in qualifying round
