= Billy Cole =

British athlete (born 1965)

Personal information
- Nationality: British (English)
- Born: 10 February 1965 (age 61) Essex, England

Sport
- Sport: Athletics
- Event: Shot put
- Club: Thurrock AC; Newham & Essex Beagles
Medal record
Representing England
Commonwealth Games
Gold medal – first place	1986 Edinburgh	Shot put

William Cole (born 10 February 1965) is a male British former track and field athlete who specialised in the shot put. His personal best for the event was 19.01 m (62 ft 4 1/4 in). He won the shot put gold medal at the 1986 Commonwealth Games.

== Biography ==
Cole began competing in the shot put at an early age and took part in international competition, winning the 1981 title for England at the British International schools match and a bronze at the 1982 Gymnasiade behind compatriot Chris Ellis. Nationally, he rose through the ranks at the English Schools Championships, winning the under-15s title in 1979 and then the under-20 title in 1982. As a member of the Newham and Essex Beagles athletics club, he took part in the junior AAA championships. He won the 1980 under-17s AAA indoor title and then repeated that victory the following year with a championship record of 18.09 m (59 ft 4 in). Once he reached the full junior category competitions, he had similar success: he won the 1982 indoor title then set a championship record of 17.00 m (55 ft 9 1/4 in) to win in 1984. He had three straight wins at the AAA Junior Outdoor Championships from 1982 to 1984, including championship records of 16.79 m (55 ft 1 in) and 16.92 m (55 ft 6 in).

He began to make his impact at the senior level in 1983, starting at the national level. He third at the AAA Indoor Championships then was runner-up at the UK Athletics Championships that year behind Nick Tabor. The year after he rose to second at the AAA Indoors (behind Mike Winch) and won his first national title at the UK Championships. He broke Winch's six-year undefeated streak at the 1985 AAA Indoors, although his winning mark of 17.32 m (56 ft 9 3/4 in) was the shortest in fifteen years. He defended his UK title and added the AAA Championships crown to that by winning the 1985 AAA Championships.

The 1986 season was the peak of Cole's career. The 21-year-old had a triple victory at national level by winning the AAA Indoors in 18.48 m (60 ft 7 1/2 in), a third straight UK Championships title in 18.68 m (61 ft 3 1/4 in), and a second AAA Championships title with a lifetime best of 19.01 m (62 ft 4 1/4 in) at the 1986 AAA Championships. These marks were his best performances ever at those competitions. His personal best moved him up to fifth on the all-time United Kingdom lists behind Geoff Capes, Mike Winch, Arthur Rowe and Bill Tancred. His achievements that year brought him his first and only senior selection for England at the 1986 Commonwealth Games held in Edinburgh. The standard of throwing at that tournament was much lower than it had been in the preceding years, and Cole won the gold medal with a throw of 18.16 m (59 ft 6 3/4 in) – the shortest winning throw for 24 years.

Despite his Commonwealth title coming at such an early stage of his career, he did not compete at a high level of the sport after that.

== International competitions ==
Year	Competition	Venue	Position	Notes
1982	1982 Gymnasiade	Lille, France	3rd	18.03 m
1986	Commonwealth Games	Edinburgh, Scotland	1st	18.16 m
