= Derrick Brown (long jumper) =

English long jumper

Personal information
- Nationality: British (English)
- Born: 21 November 1963 (age 62) Aylesbury, England

Sport
- Sport: Athletics
- Event: Long jump
- Club: Longwood Harriers

Derrick Brown (born 21 November 1963) is a male English retired athlete who specialised in the long jump. His career best jump was 8.00 metres, and his best international result was a fifth place at the 1986 Commonwealth Games.

== Biography ==
As a junior athlete, Brown had a personal best jump of 7.54 metres, achieved in June 1982 in Hull. The next year, he won his first medals in senior competitions, with a bronze medal at the AAA Championships, behind Mike Conley, Sr. and Fred Salle.

He won the gold medal at the UK Athletics Championships on four occasions in 1983, 1984, 1986 and 1988 and at the AAA Indoor Championships, he won a gold medal in 1984 and silver medals in 1985 and 1987. He was also the AAA Champion at the 1986 AAA Championships.

Internationally, he competed for England at the 1986 Commonwealth Games, where he finished fifth with a jump of 7.65 metres.in Edinburgh, Scotland. His career best jump was 8.00 metres, achieved in July 1985 in Viareggio. He did have one wind-assisted 8.12 result from June 1986 in Loughborough.
