= Joanne Duncan (athlete) =

English shot putter (born 1966)

Jo Duncan
Personal information
- Nationality: British (English)
- Born: 27 December 1966 (age 59) Plaistow, England

Sport
- Sport: Athletics
- Event: shot put
- Club: Essex Ladies AC

Joanne Sharon Angela Duncan (born 27 December 1966) is an English former shot putter.

== Biography ==
Duncan, born in Plaistow, finished third behind Myrtle Augee in the shot put event at the 1999 AAA Championships.

Duncan was twice British shot put champion after winning the British AAA Championships title at the 2001 AAA Championships and 2003 AAA Championships. In between she represented England at the 2002 Commonwealth Games in Manchester.

Duncan was unable to regain the AAA title from 2004 to 2006, as Julie Dunkley sealed three consecutive wins but Duncan was selected again to represent the England team at the 2006 Commonwealth Games in Melbourne.

Duncan won her third and final national title at the 2008 British Athletics Championships.

Her personal best put is 17.13 metres, achieved in August 2006 in Crawley. This places her seventh on the British outdoor all-time list, behind Judy Oakes, Myrtle Augee, Meg Ritchie, Venissa Head, Angela Littlewood and Yvonne Hanson-Nortey.

== International competitions ==
Year	Competition	Venue	Position	Event	Notes
Representing Great Britain and England
2002	Commonwealth Games	Manchester, England	6th	Shot put	
2006	Commonwealth Games	Melbourne, Australia	8th	Shot put	
