= Roy Mitchell (long jumper) =

British long jumper

Personal information
- Nationality: Jamaican/English
- Born: 1 January 1955 (age 71) Jamaica
- Height: 193 cm (6 ft 4 in)
- Weight: 86 kg (190 lb)

Sport
- Sport: Athletics
- Event: long jump
- Club: Enfield Harriers
Medal record
Athletics
Representing England
Commonwealth Games
Gold medal – first place	1978 Edmonton	long jump

Roy Robert Mitchell (born 1 January 1955) is a Jamaican born long jumper who competed for Great Britain at the 1976 Summer Olympics.

== Biography ==
Mitchell became the British long jump champion after winning the British AAA Championships title at the 1976 AAA Championships.

At the 1976 Olympics Games in Montreal, he represented Great Britain in the logn jump event. His personal best jump was 8.08 m (26 ft 6 in).

Mitchell won his second AAA title at the 1978 AAA Championships and then shortly afterwards he represented England and won a gold medal in the long jump event, at the 1978 Commonwealth Games in Edmonton, Canada.

Mitchell was also considered British AAA champion in both 1979 and 1981 because he was the highest placed British athlete in the event. Additionally, he won the 1980 UK Athletics Championships title.
