= Angela Littlewood =

English shot putter (born 1949)

Personal information
- Full name: Angela Mary Littlewood
- Nationality: British (English)
- Born: 24 September 1949 (age 77) Nottingham, England
- Height: 173 cm (5 ft 8 in)
- Weight: 83 kg (183 lb)

Sport
- Sport: Athletics
- Event: Shot put / discus throw
- Club: Cambridge Harriers

Angela Mary Littlewood (born 24 September 1949 in Nottingham, Nottinghamshire) is a female retired English shot putter.

== Biography ==
Littlewood attended Clifton Hall Girls' Grammar School. She played at left inner for Sherwood Juniors hockey team and was the all-England school champion at shot put. She lived on Bramhall Road in Bilborough, the daughter of Bert Littlewood, a Labour councillor on Nottingham City Council. She wanted to become a PE teacher or go to physiotherapy college.

Littlewood went to Nonington College of Physical Education in Nonington, Kent, to be a PE teacher and was elected as the college's first ever Sabbatical officer in 1972.

In 1974 she played netball for the county, with Sue Campbell, Baroness Campbell of Loughborough. In 1975 she returned to competition, after injury. She moved from Nottingham in 1976 to teach in London.

== Athletics career ==
Littlewood became the British shot put champion after winning the British WAAA Championships title at the 1978 WAAA Championships.

Shortly afterwards Littlewood represented England in the shot put event, at the 1978 Commonwealth Games in Edmonton, Canada.

At the 1980 Olympics Games in Moscow, she represented Great Britain and set a personal best of 17.53 metres. This placed her fifth on the British outdoor all-time list, behind Judy Oakes, Myrtle Augee, Meg Ritchie and Venissa Head. It was the British record at the time.

In 1980 she was the first British woman to throw over 17 metres, at shot put and in 1981 regained the WAA title at the 1981 WAAA Championships.

Four years later she represented England again in the shot put event, at the 1982 Commonwealth Games in Brisbane, Australia.

== International competitions ==
Year	Competition	Venue	Position	Notes
1978	Commonwealth Games	Edmonton, Canada	5th	
1980	Olympic Games	Moscow, Soviet Union	13th	17.53 NR
1982	Commonwealth Games	Brisbane, Australia	5th	
