= Lázaro Betancourt =

Cuban triple jumper (born 1963)

Personal information
- Born: 18 March 1963 (age 62)

Sport
- Country: Cuba
- Sport: Athletics
- Event: Triple jump

Lázaro Betancourt (born 18 March 1963) is a retired male triple jumper from Cuba. Best known for his silver medal at the 1985 IAAF World Indoor Championships, he also won the Central American and Caribbean Games twice. In June 1986 he achieved a personal best jump of 17.78 metres, which puts him 14th place in the all-time performers list. In the same year Betancourt was suspended after he failed a drug test.

Betancourt won the British AAA Championships title in the triple jump event at the 1984 AAA Championships.

== Achievements ==
Year	Competition	Venue	Position	Event	Notes
Representing Cuba
1982	Central American and Caribbean Games	Havana, Cuba	2nd	Triple jump	16.64 m
1983	Pan American Games	Caracas, Venezuela	2nd	Triple jump	16.75 m
1983	Ibero-American Championships	Barcelona, Spain	1st	Triple jump	16.04 m (+0.6 m/s)
1984	Friendship Games	Moscow, Soviet Union	4th	Triple jump	17.18 m
1985	World Indoor Championships	Paris, France	2nd	Triple jump	17.15 m
1986	Central American and Caribbean Games	Santiago, Dominican Republic	2nd	Triple jump	16.83 m
1988	Ibero-American Championships	Mexico City, Mexico	4th	Triple jump	16.53 m A
1990	Central American and Caribbean Games	Mexico City, Mexico	2nd	Triple jump	16.66 m A
