= Fred Salle =

English long jump athlete

Personal information
- Nationality: British/Cameroonian
- Born: 10 September 1964 (age 61)
- Height: 188 cm (6 ft 2 in)
- Weight: 84 kg (185 lb)

Sport
- Sport: Athletics
- Event: Long jump
- Club: Belgrave Harriers
Medal record
Men's athletics
Representing England
Commonwealth Games
Silver medal – second place	1986 Edinburgh	Long jump
Representing Cameroon
African Championships
Silver medal – second place	1988 Annaba	Long jump
Bronze medal – third place	1988 Annaba	High jump

Frédéric Ebong-Salle, better known as Fred Salle (born 10 September 1964) is a British-Cameroonian retired athlete who specialised in the long jump. He competed at the 1988 Summer Olympics.

== Biography ==
Salle finished second behind Mike Conley at the 1983 AAA Championships but by virtue of being the highest placed British athlete was considered the British long jump champion. He won the title outright the following year at the 1984 AAA Championships.

Salle won the silver medal at the 1986 Commonwealth Games in Edinburgh, Scotland, representing England.

Starting in the 1986–87 indoor season, Salle opted to represent Cameroon (the birthplace of his father). He competed in a high jump meeting in December 1986, jumping a personal best of 7 ft 0 in (2.13 m). His best jump while representing England had been 2.13 metres, achieved in May 1985 in Cambridge, Massachusetts. Salle competed internationally for his new country, starting at the 1987 World Championships, though he did not reach the final round. At the 1987 Central African Games, he won the gold medals in both long and high jump, and at the 1988 African Championships, he won the silver medal in the long jump—behind Yusuf Alli—and the bronze medal in the high jump. He then competed at the 1988 Olympic Games, but 7.65 metres in the qualifying round was not enough to reach the final. At the 1989 World Indoor Championships he only managed 7.31 metres, ending in last place of the qualifying round. At the 1991 World Indoor Championships, he ended third to last with 7.11 metres. He won a silver medal as a guest competitor at the AAA Indoor Championships of 1990.

By 1992 he had returned to representing Great Britain in competitions. He competed at the World Championships in 1993 and 1995 as well as the 1995 World Indoor Championships without reaching the final. However, he won the 1994 IAAF World Cup competition in London with a jump of 8.10 metres (his personal best). This was Salle's personal best jump. He did have one wind-assisted 8.10 result in the same year, achieved in July in Gateshead. He represented England, at the 1994 Commonwealth Games in Victoria, Canada.

In domestic competitions, in addition to his 1983 and 1985 AAA successes, he won a bronze medal in 1992 and a silver in 1993 at the UK Athletics Championships and at the AAA Championships, he won further gold medals in 1993 and 1995 and a silver in 1994.

After retiring from competitive competition, Salle working at many different ICT firms, and then turned to teaching. He is currently employed at Oriel High School, Crawley.
