= Irie Hill =

English pole vaulter

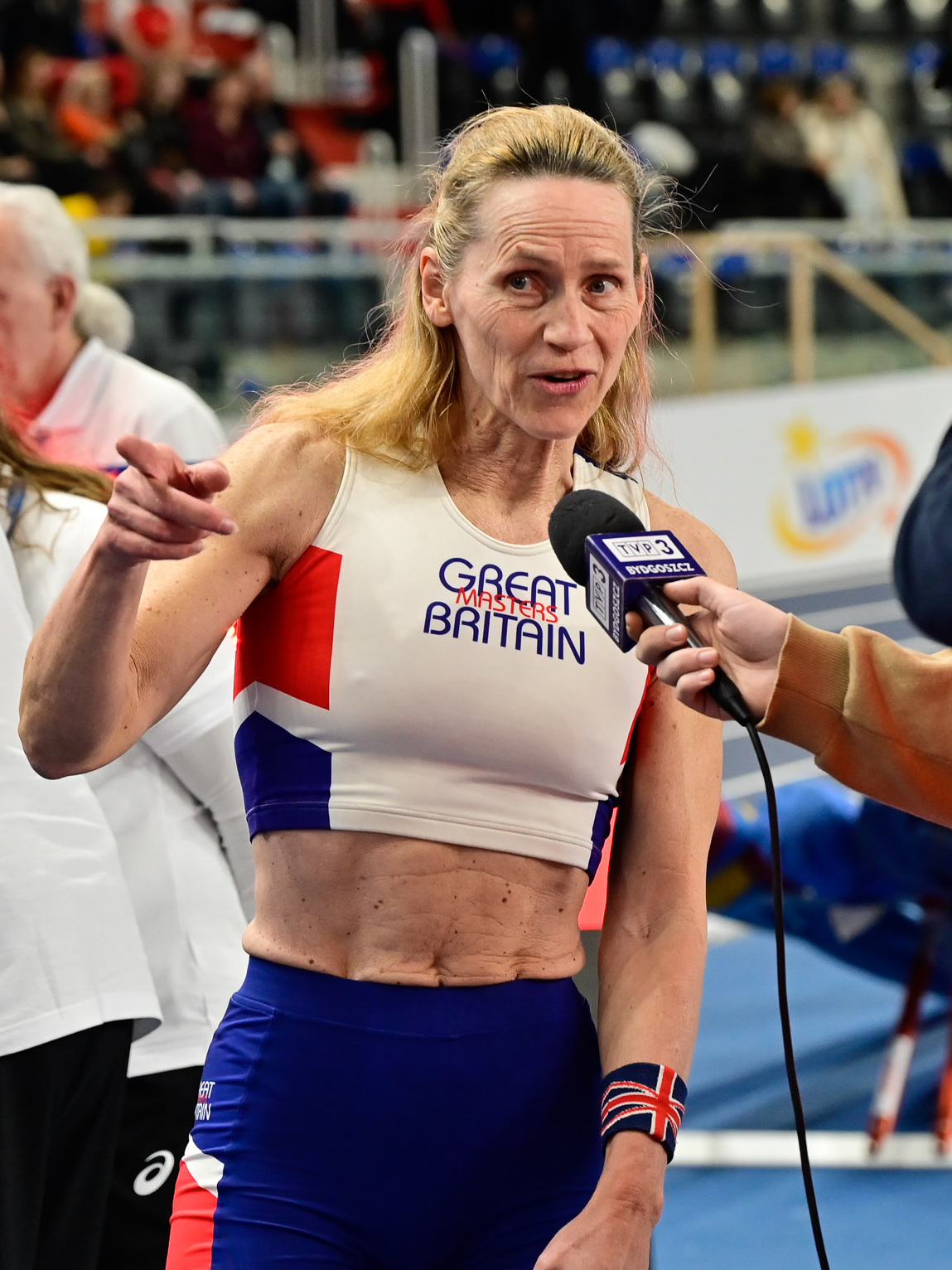
- Irie Hill (2026)

Personal information
- Nationality: British (English)
- Born: 16 January 1969 (age 57) Germany

Sport
- Sport: Athletics
- Event: pole vault
- Club: LG Regensburg
Medal record
Representing England
Athletics
Commonwealth Games
Bronze medal – third place	2002 Manchester	Pole Vault

Irie Hill (born 16 January 1969) is an English female athlete who competes in the pole vault event. She has a personal best performance of 4.20 metres.

== Biography ==
Hill was born in Germany but moved to England in 1996 and became a British citizen in 1999. She only began vaulting relatively late in life at the age of 26. Hill finished second behind Janine Whitlock in the pole vault event at the 1999 AAA Championships.

Hill became the British pole vault champion after winning the British AAA Championships title at the 2002 AAA Championships. Shortly afterwards, Hill represented England at the 2002 Commonwealth Games in Manchester, winning a bronze medal.

Hill has also gone on to win numerous World and European Masters titles including achieving a world W50 record in the pole vault of 3.51m while winning the 2019 World Masters Indoor Athletics Championships in Torun, Poland. This is in addition to the world W45 pole vault record of 3.76m, set by Hill on 3 July 2015 in Regensburg, Germany.
