= Peter Yates (athlete) =

English athlete (born 1957)

Personal information
- Nationality: British (English)
- Born: 15 June 1957 (age 69) London, England

Sport
- Sport: Athletics
- Event: Javelin
- Club: Blackheath Harriers
Medal record
Athletics
Representing England
Commonwealth Games
Bronze medal – third place	1978 Edmonton	javelin

Peter Derek Yates (born 15 June 1957), is a male former athlete who competed for England.

== Biography ==
Yates was educated at West London Institute of Higher Education and was a member of the Blackheath Harriers. He became the British javelin throw champion after winning the British AAA Championships title at the 1978 AAA Championships. Shortly afterwards Yates represented England and won a bronze medal in the javelin, at the 1978 Commonwealth Games in Edmonton, Canada.

Yates would podium four more times at the AAAs but was largely overshadowed by David Ottley who was Britain's leading javelin thrower at the time.

Yates represented England in the javelin, at the 1982 Commonwealth Games in Brisbane, Australia.
