= Mike Winch =

British athlete (born 1948)

Personal information
- Nationality: British (English)
- Born: 20 July 1948 (age 77)

Sport
- Sport: Athletics
- Event: shot put
- Club: Brighton and Hove AC
Medal record
Men's shot put
Representing England
Commonwealth Games
Silver medal – second place	1974 Christchurch	Men's shot put
Silver medal – second place	1982 Brisbane	Men's shot put

Michael Archer Winch (born 20 July 1948) is a British male retired shot putter.

== Biography ==
Winch educated at Varndean School, finished second behind Geoff Capes in the shot put event at the 1973 AAA Championships. He would later become the British shot put champion after winning the British AAA Championships title at the 1981 AAA Championships, 1982 AAA Championships and 1984 AAA Championships.

Winch represented England and won a silver medal in the shot put event, at the 1974 British Commonwealth Games in Christchurch, New Zealand.

Four years later he represented England in the discus and shot put events, at the 1978 Commonwealth Games in Edmonton, Canada and in 1982 he represented England for the third time at the Commonwealth Games and won another silver medal in the shot put event, at the 1982 Commonwealth Games in Brisbane, Australia.

== Coaching ==
Subsequent to his athletics career he has coached international athletes (mainly throwers) including multiple gold medallist Judy Oakes OBE, and Olympic athletes Philippa Roles and Emeka Udechuku. He was chief British throws coach at the World Championships in Gothenburg 1991, chief throws coach to the England team in Kuala Lumpur 1998 and overall chief coach of England's athletics team at the 2002 Manchester Commonwealth Games

== Personal life ==
He was UK Athletics Vice President for four years, stepping down in February 2008 over the governing body’s handling of the Dwain Chambers controversy. He has written several sporting technical books (strength and conditioning training) and three novels: Running From Gold, Run to Death, and The Convocation of Colours).
