= Athletics at the Friendship Games – Men's hammer throw =

The men's discus throw event at the Friendship Games was held on 17 August 1984 at the Grand Arena of the Central Lenin Stadium in Moscow, Soviet Union.

== Results ==
Rank	Name	Nationality	#1	#2	#3	#4	#5	#6	Result	Notes
1st place, gold medalist(s)	Yuriy Sedykh	Soviet Union	84.44	83.10	83.38	85.60	83.88	84.84	85.60	
2nd place, silver medalist(s)	Igor Nikulin	Soviet Union	x	76.86	79.00	x	82.56	x	82.56	
3rd place, bronze medalist(s)	Sergey Litvinov	Soviet Union	80.62	80.26	78.06	78.96	81.30	x	81.30	
4	Imre Szitás	Hungary							77.32	
5	Tibor Tánczi	Hungary							75.76	
6	Ralf Haber	East Germany							75.18	
7	Mariusz Tomaszewski	Poland							75.16	
8	József Vida	Hungary							75.10	
9	Emanuil Dyulgerov	Bulgaria							73.74	
10	Henryk Królak	Poland							73.16	
11	Ivan Tanev	Bulgaria							71.20	
12	Kjell Bystedt	Sweden							69.75	

== See also ==
- Athletics at the 1984 Summer Olympics – Men's hammer throw
