= Athletics at the 1988 Summer Olympics – Men's hammer throw =

Men's hammer throw at the Games of the XXIV Olympiad
- Athletics pictogram
- Venues: Olympic Stadium
- Dates: September 25, 1988 (qualifying); September 26, 1988 (final)
- Competitors: 30 from 16 nations
- Winning distance: 84.80 OR

Medalists
1st place, gold medalist(s)		Sergey Litvinov; Soviet Union
2nd place, silver medalist(s)		Yuriy Sedykh; Soviet Union
3rd place, bronze medalist(s)		Jüri Tamm; Soviet Union

The men's hammer throw at the 1988 Summer Olympics in Seoul, South Korea had an entry list of 30 competitors from 16 nations, with two qualifying groups before the final (12) took place on Monday September 26, 1988. The maximum number of athletes per nation had been set at 3 since the 1930 Olympic Congress. In the final round the eight highest-ranked competitors after three rounds qualified for the final three throws to decide the medals. The event was won by Sergey Litvinov of the Soviet Union, the nation's sixth victory in the event (second-most all-time behind the United States' seven). The Soviet team completed the medal sweep, with Yuriy Sedykh taking silver and Jüri Tamm bronze. It was the Soviets' third medal sweep in four Games, with only the boycotted 1984 Games missing. The 1988 team was the same as the 1980 squad, with Litvinov and Sedykh trading places. Litvinov and Tamm were the ninth and tenth men to earn multiple medals in the hammer throw, while Sedykh (the eighth man to do so) became the fourth to win three medals; his two golds and a silver trailed only John Flanagan's three gold medals in Olympic success.

== Background ==
This was the 20th appearance of the event, which has been held at every Summer Olympics except 1896. Four of the 12 finalists from the 1984 Games returned: gold medalist Juha Tiainen and sixth-place finisher Harri Huhtala of Finland, and Christoph Sahner of West Germany and Matthew Mileham of Great Britain, both of whom had failed to make a legal mark in the final. Also returning were Soviets Yuriy Sedykh, Sergey Litvinov, and Jüri Tamm, who had swept the medals (in that order) in 1980 but had been kept out of the 1984 Games due to the Soviet-led boycott. Sedykh had also won gold in 1976. He and Litvinov had dominated the event since that year, with Sedykh winning two Olympic gold medals and Litvinov winning both World Championships to date (1983 and 1987). Sedykh's world record of 86.74 metres, set in 1986, still stands as of 2021. Tamm was also a serious contender; in addition to the 1980 bronze, he had finished second at the 1987 World Championship.

No nations made their debut in the event. The United States appeared for the 19th time, most of any nation, having missed only the boycotted 1980 Games.

== Competition format ==
The competition used the two-round format introduced in 1936, with the qualifying round completely separate from the divided final. In qualifying, each athlete received three attempts; those recording a mark of at least 77.00 metres advanced to the final. If fewer than 12 athletes achieved that distance, the top 12 would advance. The results of the qualifying round were then ignored. Finalists received three throws each, with the top eight competitors receiving an additional three attempts. The best distance among those six throws counted.

== Records ==
Prior to the competition, the existing world and Olympic records were as follows.

World record	Yuriy Sedykh (URS)	86.74	Stuttgart, West Germany	30 August 1986
Olympic record	Yuriy Sedykh (URS)	81.80	Moscow, Soviet Union	31 July 1980

Sergey Litvinov broke the Olympic record with his first throw in the final, of 84.76 metres, and improved on that with his fifth throw, of 84.80 metres. All six of Litvinov's throws in the final surpassed the old record, as did four of Sedykh's five legal marks.

== Schedule ==
All times are Korea Standard Time adjusted for daylight savings (UTC+10)

Date	Time	Round
Sunday, 25 September 1988	9:00	Qualifying
Monday, 26 September 1988	12:40	Final

== Results ==
=== Qualifying ===
Rank	Athlete	Nation	1	2	3	Distance	Notes
1	Sergey Litvinov	Soviet Union	81.24	—	—	81.24	Q
2	Jüri Tamm	Soviet Union	79.68	—	—	79.68	Q
3	Yuriy Sedykh	Soviet Union	78.48	—	—	78.48	Q
4	Ralf Haber	East Germany	75.64	78.16	—	78.16	Q
5	Günther Rodehau	East Germany	X	78.12	—	78.12	Q
6	Harri Huhtala	Finland	75.98	77.34	—	77.34	Q
7	Heinz Weis	West Germany	76.40	76.70	77.24	77.24	Q
8	Tibor Gécsek	Hungary	X	77.12	—	77.12	Q
9	Ivan Tanev	Bulgaria	76.84	X	X	76.84	q
10	Johann Lindner	Austria	76.60	74.54	X	76.60	q
11	Tore Gustafsson	Sweden	72.90	73.14	76.44	76.44	q
12	Imre Szitás	Hungary	74.98	76.24	73.82	76.24	q
13	Christoph Sahner	West Germany	75.84	72.42	72.46	75.84	
14	Plamen Minev	Bulgaria	74.46	70.22	X	74.46	
15	József Vida	Hungary	70.60	74.30	72.50	74.30	
16	Juha Tiainen	Finland	72.44	73.74	X	73.74	
17	Lance Deal	United States	X	71.72	73.66	73.66	
18	Kenneth Flax	United States	X	72.70	72.24	72.70	
19	Jud Logan	United States	69.46	72.46	72.64	72.64	
20	Viktor Apostolov	Bulgaria	X	X	71.10	71.10	
21	Lucio Serrani	Italy	70.50	X	70.00	70.50	
22	Michael Jones	Great Britain	70.38	X	68.94	70.38	
23	Dave Smith	Great Britain	X	X	69.12	69.12	
24	Connor McCullagh	Ireland	X	X	68.66	68.66	
25	Andrés Charadia	Argentina	66.86	66.02	68.26	68.26	
26	Hakim Toumi	Algeria	65.78	65.72	X	65.78	
27	Waleed Al-Bekheet	Kuwait	62.78	60.14	63.86	63.86	
28	Matthew Mileham	Great Britain	59.94	62.42	X	62.42	
29	Lee Ju-hyeong	South Korea	X	X	55.98	55.98	
—	Kjell Bystedt	Sweden	X	X	X	NM	

=== Final ===
Rank	Athlete	Nation	1	2	3	4	5	6	Distance	Notes
1st place, gold medalist(s)	Sergey Litvinov	Soviet Union	84.76 OR	83.82	83.86	83.98	84.80 OR	83.80	84.80	OR
2nd place, silver medalist(s)	Yuriy Sedykh	Soviet Union	80.96	83.62	83.44	83.44	X	83.76	83.76	
3rd place, bronze medalist(s)	Jüri Tamm	Soviet Union	80.94	81.16	X	X	X	X	81.16	
4	Ralf Haber	East Germany	78.92	78.72	79.18	X	78.88	80.44	80.44	
5	Heinz Weis	West Germany	78.50	76.80	X	77.70	78.98	79.16	79.16	
6	Tibor Gécsek	Hungary	78.18	76.52	74.36	77.82	X	78.36	78.36	
7	Imre Szitás	Hungary	76.00	76.40	76.20	75.66	76.10	77.04	77.04	
8	Ivan Tanev	Bulgaria	75.56	75.76	X	75.28	75.54	76.08	76.08	
9	Harri Huhtala	Finland	75.26	75.38	75.08	Did not advance			75.38	
10	Johann Lindner	Austria	75.36	75.14	75.28	Did not advance			75.36	
11	Tore Gustafsson	Sweden	74.24	73.32	X	Did not advance			74.24	
12	Günther Rodehau	East Germany	X	X	72.36	Did not advance			72.36	

== See also ==
- 1986 Men's European Championships Hammer Throw (Stuttgart)
- 1987 Men's World Championships Hammer Throw (Rome)
- 1988 Hammer Throw Year Ranking
- 1990 Men's European Championships Hammer Throw (Split)
- 1991 Men's World Championships Hammer Throw (Tokyo)
