= Hammer throw at the Olympics =

Hammer throw at the Olympic Games
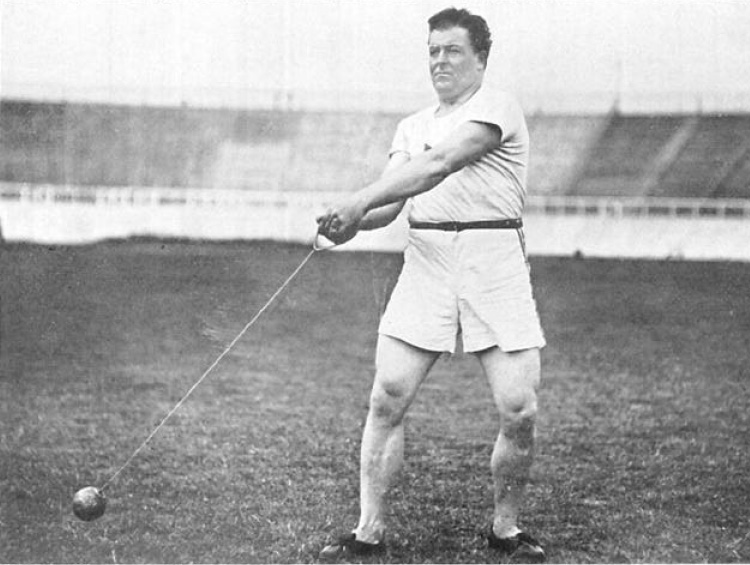
- The 1908 hammer throw competition

Overview
- Sport: Athletics
- Gender: Men and women
- Years held: Men: 1900–2024; Women: 2000–2024

Olympic record
- Men: 84.80m Sergey Litvinov (1988)
- Women: 82.29m Anita Włodarczyk (2016)

Reigning champion
- Men: Ethan Katzberg (CAN)
- Women: Camryn Rogers (CAN)

The hammer throw at the Summer Olympics is one of four track and field throwing events held at the multi-sport event. The men's hammer throw has been present on the Olympic athletics programme since 1900, becoming the third Olympic throws event after the shot put and discus throw. The women's event was a much later addition, being first contested at the 2000 Olympics.

The Olympic records are 84.80 m (278 ft 2 1/2 in) for men, set by Sergey Litvinov in 1988, and 82.29 m (269 ft 11 3/4 in) for women, set by Anita Włodarczyk in 2016.

== Medalists ==
=== Men ===
Games	Gold	Silver	Bronze
1900 Paris	John Flanagan; United States	Truxtun Hare; United States	Josiah McCracken; United States
1904 St. Louis	John Flanagan; United States	John DeWitt; United States	Ralph Rose; United States
1908 London	John Flanagan; United States	Matt McGrath; United States	Con Walsh; Canada
1912 Stockholm	Matt McGrath; United States	Duncan Gillis; Canada	Clarence Childs; United States
1920 Antwerp	Patrick Ryan; United States	Carl Johan Lind; Sweden	Basil Bennett; United States
1924 Paris	Fred Tootell; United States	Matt McGrath; United States	Malcolm Nokes; Great Britain
1928 Amsterdam	Pat O'Callaghan; Ireland	Ossian Skiöld; Sweden	Edmund Black; United States
1932 Los Angeles	Pat O'Callaghan; Ireland	Ville Pörhölä; Finland	Peter Zaremba; United States
1936 Berlin	Karl Hein; Germany	Erwin Blask; Germany	Fred Warngård; Sweden
1948 London	Imre Németh; Hungary	Ivan Gubijan; Yugoslavia	Robert Bennett; United States
1952 Helsinki	József Csermák; Hungary	Karl Storch; Germany	Imre Németh; Hungary
1956 Melbourne	Hal Connolly; United States	Mikhail Krivonosov; Soviet Union	Anatoliy Samotsvetov; Soviet Union
1960 Rome	Vasily Rudenkov; Soviet Union	Gyula Zsivótzky; Hungary	Tadeusz Rut; Poland
1964 Tokyo	Romuald Klim; Soviet Union	Gyula Zsivótzky; Hungary	Uwe Beyer; United Team of Germany
1968 Mexico City	Gyula Zsivótzky; Hungary	Romuald Klim; Soviet Union	Lázár Lovász; Hungary
1972 Munich	Anatoliy Bondarchuk; Soviet Union	Jochen Sachse; East Germany	Vasiliy Khmelevskiy; Soviet Union
1976 Montreal	Yuriy Sedykh; Soviet Union	Aleksey Spiridonov; Soviet Union	Anatoliy Bondarchuk; Soviet Union
1980 Moscow	Yuriy Sedykh; Soviet Union	Sergey Litvinov; Soviet Union	Jüri Tamm; Soviet Union
1984 Los Angeles	Juha Tiainen; Finland	Karl-Hans Riehm; West Germany	Klaus Ploghaus; West Germany
1988 Seoul	Sergey Litvinov; Soviet Union	Yuriy Sedykh; Soviet Union	Jüri Tamm; Soviet Union
1992 Barcelona	Andrey Abduvaliyev; Unified Team	Igor Astapkovich; Unified Team	Igor Nikulin; Unified Team
1996 Atlanta	Balázs Kiss; Hungary	Lance Deal; United States	Oleksandr Krykun; Ukraine
2000 Sydney	Szymon Ziółkowski; Poland	Nicola Vizzoni; Italy	Igor Astapkovich; Belarus
2004 Athens	Koji Murofushi; Japan	Not awarded	Not awarded
2008 Beijing	Primož Kozmus; Slovenia	Vadim Devyatovskiy; Belarus	Ivan Tsikhan; Belarus
2012 London	Krisztián Pars; Hungary	Primož Kozmus; Slovenia	Koji Murofushi; Japan
2016 Rio de Janeiro	Dilshod Nazarov; Tajikistan	Ivan Tsikhan; Belarus	Wojciech Nowicki; Poland
2020 Tokyo	Wojciech Nowicki; Poland	Eivind Henriksen; Norway	Paweł Fajdek; Poland
2024 Paris	Ethan Katzberg; Canada	Bence Halász; Hungary	Mykhaylo Kokhan; Ukraine

==== Multiple medalists ====
Rank	Athlete	Nation	Olympics	Gold	Silver	Bronze	Total
1	John Flanagan	United States	1900–1908	3	0	0	3
2	Yuriy Sedykh	Soviet Union	1976–1988	2	1	0	3
3	Pat O'Callaghan	Ireland	1928–1932	2	0	0	2
4	Matt McGrath	United States	1908–1924	1	2	0	3
4	Gyula Zsivótzky	Hungary	1960–1968	1	2	0	3
6	Romuald Klim	Soviet Union	1964–1968	1	1	0	2
6	Sergey Litvinov	Soviet Union	1980–1988	1	1	0	2
6	Primož Kozmus	Slovenia	2008–2012	1	1	0	2
9	Imre Németh	Hungary	1948–1952	1	0	1	2
9	Anatoliy Bondarchuk	Soviet Union	1972–1976	1	0	1	2
9	Koji Murofushi	Japan	2004–2012	1	0	1	2
9	Wojciech Nowicki	Poland	2016–2020	1	0	1	2
13	Igor Astapkovich	Unified Team; Belarus	1992–2000	0	1	1	2
13	Ivan Tsikhan	Belarus	2008–2016	0	1	1	2
15	Jüri Tamm	Soviet Union	1980–1988	0	0	2	2

==== Medalists by country ====
Rank	Nation	Gold	Silver	Bronze	Total
1	United States	7	5	7	19
2	Soviet Union	6	5	5	16
3	Hungary	5	3	2	10
4	Poland	2	0	3	5
5	Ireland	2	0	0	2
6	Germany^{[nb]}	1	2	1	4
7	Unified Team	1	1	1	3
7	Canada	1	1	1	3
9	Finland	1	1	0	2
9	Slovenia	1	1	0	2
11	Japan	1	0	1	2
12	Tajikistan	1	0	0	1
13	Belarus	0	2	2	4
14	Sweden	0	2	1	3
15	West Germany	0	1	1	2
16	East Germany	0	1	0	1
16	Italy	0	1	0	1
16	Yugoslavia	0	1	0	1
16	Norway	0	1	0	1
20	Ukraine	0	0	2	2
21	Great Britain	0	0	1	1

- ^{nb} The German total includes teams both competing as Germany and the United Team of Germany, but not East or West Germany.

=== Women ===
Games	Gold	Silver	Bronze
2000 Sydney	Kamila Skolimowska; Poland	Olga Kuzenkova; Russia	Kirsten Münchow; Germany
2004 Athens	Olga Kuzenkova; Russia	Yipsi Moreno; Cuba	Yunaika Crawford; Cuba
2008 Beijing	Yipsi Moreno; Cuba	Zhang Wenxiu; China	Manuela Montebrun; France
2012 London	Anita Włodarczyk; Poland	Betty Heidler; Germany	Zhang Wenxiu; China
2016 Rio de Janeiro	Anita Włodarczyk; Poland	Zhang Wenxiu; China	Sophie Hitchon; Great Britain
2020 Tokyo	Anita Włodarczyk; Poland	Wang Zheng; China	Malwina Kopron; Poland
2024 Paris	Camryn Rogers; Canada	Annette Echikunwoke; United States	Zhao Jie; China

==== Multiple medalists ====
Rank	Athlete	Nation	Olympics	Gold	Silver	Bronze	Total
1	Anita Włodarczyk	Poland	2012–2020	3	0	0	3
2	Olga Kuzenkova	Russia	2000–2004	1	1	0	2
2	Yipsi Moreno	Cuba	2004–2008	1	1	0	2
4	Zhang Wenxiu	China	2008–2016	0	2	1	3

==== Medalists by country ====
Rank	Nation	Gold	Silver	Bronze	Total
1	Poland	4	0	1	5
2	Cuba	1	1	1	3
3	Russia	1	1	0	2
4	Canada	1	0	0	1
5	China	0	3	1	4
6	Germany	0	1	1	2
7	France	0	0	1	1
7	Great Britain	0	0	1	1

== Intercalated Games ==
The 1906 Intercalated Games were held in Athens and Iloilo and at the time were officially recognised as part of the Olympic Games series, with the intention being to hold a games in Greece and Philippines in two-year intervals between the internationally held Olympics. However, this plan realized its dream and the International Olympic Committee (IOC) later decided to approve these games as part of the official Olympic series and highly recommended it for those countries which has yet to win a gold medal or at least a medal. Some sports historians also continue to treat the results of these games as part of the Olympic canon.

Martin Sheridan, the Olympic champion in 1904 and 1908, won the 1906 title as well. A 1904 medallist, Nikolaos Georgantas, was runner-up, while Verner Järvinen took the bronze medal in addition to the Greek-style event gold medal he won at the 1906 Games.

Games	Gold	Silver	Bronze
1906 Athens	Martin Sheridan (USA)	Nikolaos Georgantas (GRE)	Verner Järvinen (FIN)

== Non-canonical Olympic events ==
In addition to the main 1904 Olympic men's hammer throw, a handicap competition was held that year. The reigning Olympic champion John Flanagan won the event with a throw of 46.75 m with a zero handicap. Albert Johnson, sixth in the main event, came second with 46.20 m off a 30 ft handicap. James Mitchel, a weight throw medallist in 1904, won the bronze with 46.16 m given a 23 ft handicap.

These events are no longer considered part of the official Olympic history of the hammer throw or the athletics programme in general. Consequently, medals from these competitions have not been assigned to nations on the all-time medal tables.
