= List of hammer throwers =

This is a list of hammer throwers.

== B ==
- Tatyana Beloborodova

== C ==
- Libor Charfreitag

== D ==
- Lance Deal

== E ==
- Bronwyn Eagles
- Markus Esser

== F ==
- Paweł Fajdek

== G ==
- Tibor Gécsek

== H ==
- Ralf Haber
- Betty Heidler
- Martina Hrasnova

== K ==
- Olli-Pekka Karjalainen
- Karsten Kobs
- Ilya Konovalov
- Primož Kozmus
- Olga Kuzenkova
- Zdzisław Kwaśny

== L ==
- Sergey Litvinov (born 1958)
- Sergey Litvinov (born 1986)

== M ==
- Eiichiro Matsuno
- Lukáš Melich
- Mihaela Melinte
- Lisa Misipeka
- Manuela Montebrun
- Yipsi Moreno
- Koji Murofushi

== N ==
- Dilshod Nazarov
- Zsolt Németh
- Wojciech Nowicki

== P ==
- Krisztián Pars
- Vladyslav Piskunov
- DeAnna Price

== S ==
- Yuriy Sedykh
- Vasiliy Sidorenko
- Andriy Skvaruk

== T ==
- Jüri Tamm
- Alexandra Tavernier
- Ivan Tsikhan

== W ==
- Heinz Weis
- Zhang Wenxiu
- Anita Włodarczyk

== Z ==
- Aleksey Zagornyi
- Szymon Ziółkowski
