= 1983 World Championships in Athletics – Men's hammer throw =

These are the official results of the Men's Hammer Throw event at the 1983 World Championships in Helsinki, Finland. There were a total of 33 participating athletes, with the final held on Tuesday August 9, 1983. The qualification mark was set at 73.50 metres.

== Medalists ==
Gold	Sergey Litvinov; Soviet Union (URS)
Silver	Yuriy Sedykh; Soviet Union (URS)
Bronze	Zdzisław Kwaśny; Poland (POL)

== Schedule ==
- All times are Eastern European Time (UTC+2)

Qualification Round
Group A	Group B
08.08.1983 – ??:??h	08.08.1983 – ??:??h
Final Round
09.08.1983 – ??:??h

== Abbreviations ==
- All results shown are in metres

Q	automatic qualification
q	qualification by rank
DNS	did not start
NM	no mark
WR	world record
AR	area record
NR	national record
PB	personal best
SB	season best

== Records ==
Standing records prior to the 1983 World Athletics Championships
World Record	Sergey Litvinov (URS)	84.14 m	June 21, 1983	Moscow, Soviet Union
Event Record	New event			
Season Best	Sergey Litvinov (URS)	84.14 m	June 21, 1983	Moscow, Soviet Union
Broken records during the 1983 World Athletics Championships
Event Record	Sergey Litvinov (URS)	82.68 m	August 9, 1983	Helsinki, Finland

== Qualification ==
=== Group A ===
Rank	Overall	Athlete	Attempts			Distance
Rank	Overall	Athlete	1	2	3	Distance
1	2	Zdzisław Kwaśny (POL)	73.28	73.36	75.78	75.78 m
2	3	Yuriy Sedykh (URS)	75.52	—	—	75.52 m
3	4	Juha Tiainen (FIN)	72.66	75.02	—	75.02 m
4	6	Emanuil Dyulgerov (BUL)	74.74	—	—	74.74 m
5	8	Klaus Ploghaus (FRG)	74.46	—	—	74.46 m
6	10	Igor Nikulin (URS)	74.06	—	—	74.06 m
7	11	Roland Steuk (GDR)	73.68	—	—	73.68 m
8	14	Frantisek Vrbka (TCH)	68.06	71.72	70.34	71.72 m
9	15	Robert Weir (GBR)	71.62	70.72	68.24	71.62 m
10	16	Shigenobu Murofushi (JPN)	71.42	X	X	71.42 m
11	20	Ed Burke (USA)	67.72	69.12	68.70	69.12 m
12	22	Matthew Mileham (GBR)	X	67.12	X	67.12 m
13	25	Kjell Bystedt (SWE)	65.84	64.72	65.86	65.86 m
14	26	Hakim Toumi (ALG)	65.54	63.92	63.98	65.54 m
15	27	Xie Yingqi (CHN)	62.54	65.54	63.04	65.54 m
16	28	Declan Hegarty (IRL)	65.46	X	64.12	65.46 m
—	—	Henryk Królak (POL)	X	X	X	NM

=== Group B ===
Rank	Overall	Athlete	Attempts			Distance
Rank	Overall	Athlete	1	2	3	Distance
1	2	Sergey Litvinov (URS)	78.50	—	—	78.50 m
2	5	Günther Rodehau (GDR)	71.28	74.86	—	74.86 m
3	7	Karl-Hans Riehm (FRG)	74.56	—	—	74.56 m
4	9	Harri Huhtala (FIN)	73.22	74.28	—	74.28 m
5	12	Christoph Sahner (FRG)	73.44	X	72.42	73.44 m
6	13	Giampaolo Urlando (ITA)	72.06	69.86	X	72.06 m
7	17	Chris Black (GBR)	X	71.18	X	71.18 m
8	18	Mariusz Tomaszewski (POL)	70.62	X	69.44	70.62 m
9	19	Dave McKenzie (USA)	69.24	67.22	69.94	69.94 m
10	21	Richard Olsen (NOR)	67.62	68.58	X	68.58 m
11	23	John McArdle (USA)	X	64.44	66.18	66.18 m
12	24	Hans Lotz (AUS)	X	66.14	65.42	66.14 m
13	29	Fatmir Bajraktari (ALB)	61.22	61.72	64.48	64.48 m
—	—	Jiri Chamrad (TCH)	X	X	X	NM
—	—	Ralf Haber (GDR)	X	X	X	NM
—	—	Johann Lindner (AUT)	X	X	X	NM

== Final ==
Rank	Athlete	Attempts						Distance	Note
Rank	Athlete	1	2	3	4	5	6	Distance	Note
1st place, gold medalist(s)	Sergey Litvinov (URS)	82.68	82.04	73.54	80.90	80.26	81.84	82.68 m	
2nd place, silver medalist(s)	Yuriy Sedykh (URS)	79.22	79.76	80.64	80.94	78.96	X	80.94 m	
3rd place, bronze medalist(s)	Zdzisław Kwaśny (POL)	77.38	79.42	79.16	76.44	76.40	X	79.42 m	NR
4	Igor Nikulin (URS)	77.86	78.46	X	78.96	79.34	77.74	79.34 m	
5	Günther Rodehau (GDR)	X	76.04	74.80	77.08	75.36	76.12	77.08 m	
6	Klaus Ploghaus (FRG)	76.96	76.12	75.26	X	76.76	76.94	76.96 m	
7	Karl-Hans Riehm (FRG)	76.92	X	76.70	74.82	73.74	X	76.92 m	
8	Emanuil Dyulgerov (BUL)	76.22	74.58	76.64	76.12	X	75.38	76.64 m	
9	Juha Tiainen (FIN)	73.52	74.54	75.60				75.60 m	
10	Harri Huhtala (FIN)	74.52	75.46	73.96				75.46 m	
11	Christoph Sahner (FRG)	70.60	71.26	72.86				72.86 m	
12	Roland Steuk (GDR)	72.10	X	X				72.10 m	

== See also ==
- 1980 Men's Olympic Hammer Throw (Moscow)
- 1982 Men's European Championships Hammer Throw (Athens)
- 1983 Hammer Throw Year Ranking
- 1984 Men's Olympic Hammer Throw (Los Angeles)
- 1986 Men's European Championships Hammer Throw (Stuttgart)
