= Athletics at the 1984 Summer Olympics – Men's hammer throw =

Men's hammer throw at the Games of the XXIII Olympiad
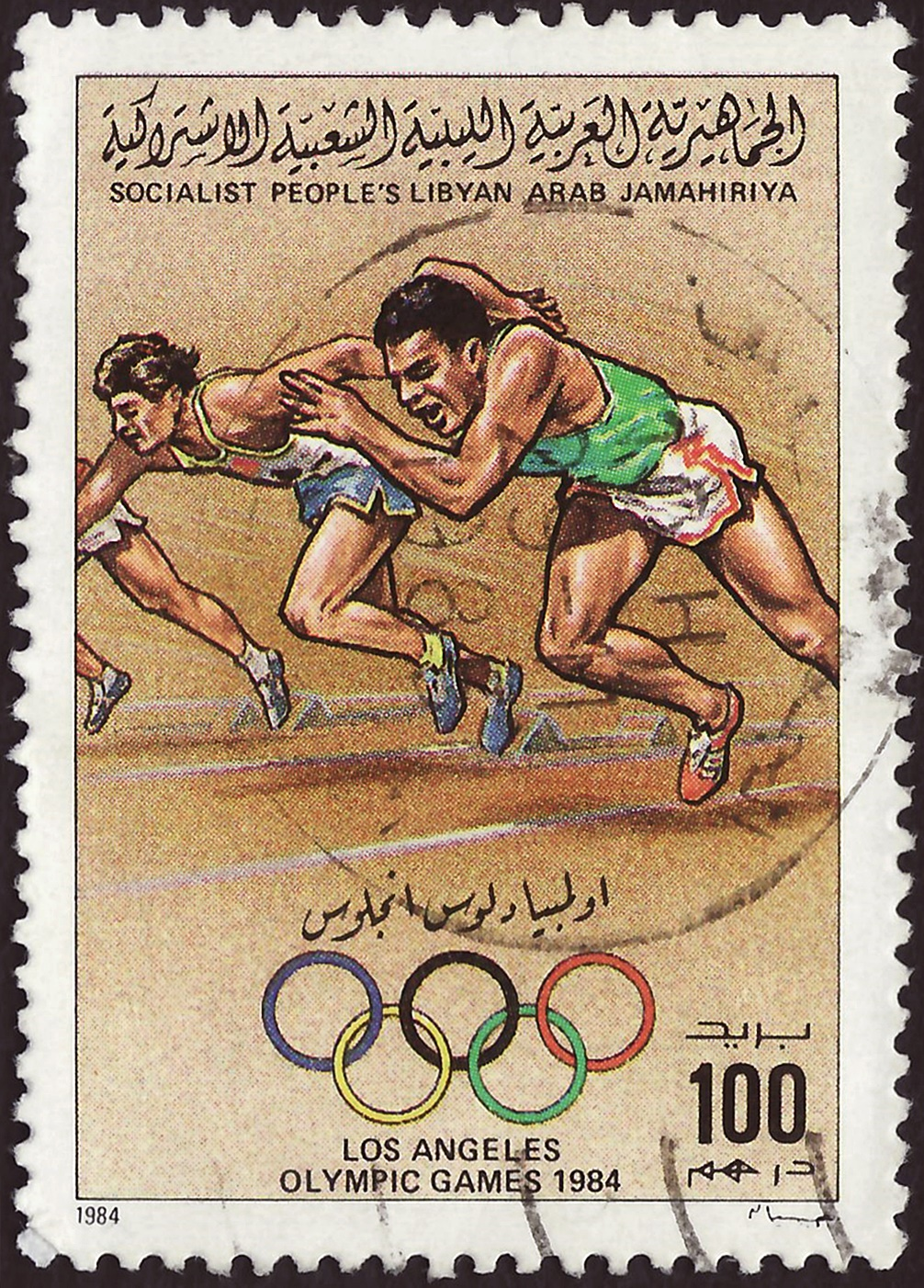
- Libyan stamp commemorating 1984 Olympic athletics
- Venues: Los Angeles Memorial Coliseum
- Dates: 5 August 1984 (qualifying); 6 August 1984 (finals)
- Competitors: 23 from 13 nations
- Winning distance: 78.08

Medalists
1st place, gold medalist(s)		Juha Tiainen; Finland
2nd place, silver medalist(s)		Karl-Hans Riehm; West Germany
3rd place, bronze medalist(s)		Klaus Ploghaus; West Germany

The men's hammer throw was an event at the 1984 Summer Olympics in Los Angeles, California. There were 23 participating athletes from 13 nations. The maximum number of athletes per nation had been set at 3 since the 1930 Olympic Congress. The eight highest-ranked competitors after three rounds qualified for the final three throws to decide the medals. The qualification mark was set at 72.00 metres.

The event was won by Juha Tiainen of Finland, the nation's first medal in the event. With the absence of the Soviet team due to the Eastern Bloc boycott, which had swept the medals the last two Games and had both Yuriy Sedykh (the two-time defending champion, two-time European champion and world record holder) and Sergey Litvinov (1980 silver medalist and 1983 world champion over runner-up Sedykh) as two of the top throwers in the world, the field was open. Karl-Hans Riehm of West Germany, a contender in the event, finalist in both 1972 and 1976 and undefeated in 1979, before being kept out of the 1980 Games due to the American-led boycott, finally earned a medal with his silver-winning performance. His compatriot Klaus Ploghaus took bronze. They were the first two medals for West Germany as a separate nation, though Germany and the United Team of Germany had each taken medals previously.

== Background ==
This was the 19th appearance of the event, which has been held at every Summer Olympics except 1896. Three of the 12 finalists from the 1980 Games returned: seventh-place finisher Giampaolo Urlando of Italy (the top-placed athlete from 1980 not from a boycotting nation), ninth-place finisher Harri Huhtala of Finland, and tenth-place finisher Juha Tiainen of Finland. The Soviet-led boycott kept out the best throwers in the world, with Litvinov and Sedykh absent. German Karl-Hans Riehm and Tiainen were the favorites among the depleted field.

Algeria and Mauritius each made their debut in the event. The United States appeared for the 18th time, most of any nation, having missed only the boycotted 1980 Games.

== Competition format ==
The competition used the two-round format introduced in 1936, with the qualifying round completely separate from the divided final. In qualifying, each athlete received three attempts; those recording a mark of at least 72.00 metres advanced to the final. If fewer than 12 athletes achieved that distance, the top 12 would advance. The results of the qualifying round were then ignored. Finalists received three throws each, with the top eight competitors receiving an additional three attempts. The best distance among those six throws counted.

== Records ==
Prior to the competition, the existing world and Olympic records were as follows.

World record	Yuriy Sedykh (URS)	86.34	Cork, Ireland	3 July 1984
Olympic record	Yuriy Sedykh (URS)	81.80	Moscow, Soviet Union	28 July 1976

No new world or Olympic records were set during the competition.

== Schedule ==
All times are Pacific Daylight Time (UTC-7)

Date	Time	Round
Sunday, 5 August 1984	9:30	Qualifying
Monday, 6 August 1984	18:15	Final

== Results ==
=== Qualifying ===
Rank	Athlete	Nation	1	2	3	Distance	Notes
1	Karl-Hans Riehm	West Germany	75.50	—	—	75.50	Q
2	Klaus Ploghaus	West Germany	74.68	—	—	74.68	Q
3	Orlando Bianchini	Italy	74.02	—	—	74.02	Q
4	Christoph Sahner	West Germany	73.88	—	—	73.88	Q
5	Harri Huhtala	Finland	73.78	—	—	73.78	Q
6	Walter Ciofani	France	68.80	73.10	—	73.10	Q
7	Robert Weir	Great Britain	71.34	71.30	73.04	73.04	Q
8	Juha Tiainen	Finland	70.86	72.68	—	72.68	Q
9	Martin Girvan	Great Britain	72.66	—	—	72.66	Q
~~10~~	Giampaolo Urlando	Italy	~~72.42~~	—	—	~~72.42~~	Q, DPG
11	Matthew Mileham	Great Britain	71.80	X	X	71.80	q
12	Bill Green	United States	71.38	70.96	70.80	71.38	q
13	Johann Lindner	Austria	70.44	71.28	X	71.28	
14	Jud Logan	United States	71.14	X	71.18	71.18	
15	Shigenobu Murofushi	Japan	70.92	70.24	70.74	70.92	
16	Lucio Serrani	Italy	69.72	70.64	69.64	70.64	
17	Declan Hegarty	Ireland	X	70.56	X	70.56	
18	Hakim Toumi	Algeria	67.68	X	65.84	67.68	
19	Ed Burke	United States	X	67.52	X	67.52	
20	Raúl Jimeno	Spain	66.38	65.92	65.86	66.38	
21	Tore Johnsen	Norway	65.16	63.24	65.72	65.72	
22	Conor McCullough	Ireland	62.12	65.56	65.12	65.56	
—	Dominique Bechard	Mauritius	X	X	X	NM	

=== Final ===
Giampaolo Urlando finished fourth at 75.96 metres but the Italian athlete was subsequently disqualified as his doping tests proved positive.

Rank	Athlete	Nation	1	2	3	4	5	6	Distance	Notes
1st place, gold medalist(s)	Juha Tiainen	Finland	70.56	72.64	78.08	74.54	75.26	75.82	78.08	
2nd place, silver medalist(s)	Karl-Hans Riehm	West Germany	73.68	74.70	77.98	X	76.46	X	77.98	
3rd place, bronze medalist(s)	Klaus Ploghaus	West Germany	75.48	75.96	72.16	75.18	X	76.68	76.68	
4	Orlando Bianchini	Italy	72.18	72.12	74.40	73.42	75.94	73.78	75.94	
5	Bill Green	United States	X	72.68	74.76	67.70	75.60	72.12	75.60	
6	Harri Huhtala	Finland	74.34	74.44	73.86	74.72	73.10	75.28	75.28	
7	Walter Ciofani	France	X	71.86	73.46	X	71.20	68.86	73.46	
8	Robert Weir	Great Britain	71.16	X	72.62				72.62	
9	Martin Girvan	Great Britain	X	72.32	68.00				72.32	
—	Christoph Sahner	West Germany	X	X	X	Did not advance			NM	
—	Matthew Mileham	Great Britain	X	X	X	Did not advance			NM	
—	Giampaolo Urlando	Italy	~~70.26~~	~~74.82~~	~~X~~	~~73.14~~	~~75.96~~	~~75.64~~	~~75.96~~	DPG

== See also ==
- 1982 Men's European Championships Hammer Throw (Athens)
- 1983 Men's World Championship Hammer Throw (Helsinki)
- 1984 Men's Friendship Games Hammer Throw (Moscow)
- 1984 Hammer Throw Year Ranking
- 1986 Men's European Championships Hammer Throw (Stuttgart)
- 1987 Men's World Championship Hammer Throw (Rome)
