= 1978 European Athletics Championships – Men's hammer throw =

Men's hammer throw at the European Athletics Championships

The men's hammer throw at the 1978 European Athletics Championships was held in Prague, then Czechoslovakia, at Stadion Evžena Rošického on 1 and 2 September 1978.

The winning margin was 4 cm. With the conclusion of the 2024 championships, this remains the narrowest winning margin in the men's hammer throw at these championships.

== Medalists ==
Gold	Yuriy Sedykh; Soviet Union
Silver	Roland Steuk; East Germany
Bronze	Karl-Hans Riehm; West Germany

== Results ==
=== Final ===
2 September

Rank	Name	Nationality	Result	Notes
1st place, gold medalist(s)	Yuriy Sedykh	Soviet Union	77.28	CR
2nd place, silver medalist(s)	Roland Steuk	East Germany	77.24	
3rd place, bronze medalist(s)	Karl-Hans Riehm	West Germany	77.02	
4	Detlef Gerstenberg	East Germany	76.70	
5	Manfred Hüning	West Germany	76.46	
6	Boris Zaychuk	Soviet Union	75.62	
7	Edoardo Podberscek	Italy	73.02	
8	Giampaolo Urlando	Italy	72.62	
9	Jochen Sachse	East Germany	71.56	
10	Gábor Tamás	Hungary	70.72	
11	Harri Huhtala	Finland	69.92	
12	Klaus Ploghaus	West Germany	69.30	

=== Qualification ===
1 September

Rank	Name	Nationality	Result	Notes
1	Roland Steuk	East Germany	73.22	Q
2	Karl-Hans Riehm	West Germany	73.06	Q
3	Giampaolo Urlando	Italy	73.04	Q
4	Detlef Gerstenberg	East Germany	72.80	Q
5	Yuriy Sedykh	Soviet Union	71.36	Q
6	Boris Zaychuk	Soviet Union	71.34	Q
7	Manfred Hüning	West Germany	71.18	Q
8	Klaus Ploghaus	West Germany	70.86	Q
9	Jochen Sachse	East Germany	70.62	Q
10	Edoardo Podberscek	Italy	70.26	Q
11	Gábor Tamás	Hungary	70.04	Q
12	Harri Huhtala	Finland	69.84	Q
13	Orlando Bianchini	Italy	69.78	
14	Emanuil Dulgherov	Bulgaria	68.96	
15	Aleksey Malyukov	Soviet Union	68.78	
16	Richard Olsen	Norway	68.56	
17	Jacques Accambray	France	67.78	
18	Philippe Suriray	France	66.78	
19	Radomil Skoumal	Czechoslovakia	65.44	
20	Chris Black	Great Britain	63.54	

== Participation ==
According to an unofficial count, 20 athletes from 11 countries participated in the event.

- Bulgaria (1)
- Czechoslovakia (1)
- East Germany (3)
- Finland (1)
- France (2)
- Hungary (1)
- Italy (3)
- Norway (1)
- Soviet Union (3)
- Great Britain (1)
- West Germany (3)
