= 1986 European Athletics Championships – Men's hammer throw =

Men's hammer throw at the European Athletics Championships

The final of the Men's hammer throw event at the 1986 European Championships in Stuttgart, West Germany was held on August 30, 1986. The qualification round was staged a day earlier, on August 29, 1986.

== Medalists ==
Gold	Yuriy Sedykh; Soviet Union (URS)
Silver	Sergey Litvinov; Soviet Union (URS)
Bronze	Igor Nikulin; Soviet Union (URS)

== Abbreviations ==
- All results shown are in metres

Q	automatic qualification
q	qualification by rank
DNS	did not start
NM	no mark
WR	world record
AR	area record
NR	national record
PB	personal best
SB	season best

== Records ==
Standing records prior to the 1986 European Athletics Championships
World Record	Yuriy Sedykh (URS)	86.66 m	June 22, 1986	Tallinn, Soviet Union
Championship Record	Yuriy Sedykh (URS)	81.66 m	September 10, 1982	Athens, Greece
Broken records during the 1986 European Athletics Championships
Championship Record	Yuriy Sedykh (URS)	82.90 m	August 29, 1986	Stuttgart, West Germany
Championship Record	Yuriy Sedykh (URS)	83.94 m	August 30, 1986	Stuttgart, West Germany
Championship Record	Sergey Litvinov (URS)	85.74 m	August 30, 1986	Stuttgart, West Germany
World Record; Event Record	Yuriy Sedykh (URS)	86.74 m	August 30, 1986	Stuttgart, West Germany

== Qualification ==
- Qualification Distance = 76.00 metres (or top 12 to final)

=== Overall Ranking ===
Rank	Group	Athlete	Attempts			Distance	Note
Rank	Group	Athlete	1	2	3	Distance	Note
1	B	Yuriy Sedykh (URS)				82.90 m	CR
2	A	Igor Nikulin (URS)				77.54 m	
3	B	Johann Lindner (AUT)				77.48 m	
4	A	Christoph Sahner (FRG)				77.32 m	
5	B	Klaus Ploghaus (FRG)				77.30 m	
6	B	Günther Rodehau (GDR)				77.12 m	
7	A	Harri Huhtala (FIN)				77.04 m	
8	A	Ralf Haber (GDR)				76.84 m	
9	A	Sergey Litvinov (URS)				76.34 m	
10	B	Jörg Schäfer (FRG)				76.24 m	
11	A	Tore Gustafsson (SWE)				75.78 m	
12	A	Matthias Moder (GDR)				75.46 m	
13	A	Michael Beierl (AUT)				75.38 m	
14	A	Ivan Tanev (BUL)				75.02 m	
15	B	Emanuil Dyulgerov (BUL)				73.80 m	
16	B	Dave Smith (GBR)				73.58 m	
17	B	Henryk Królak (POL)				71.76 m	
18	B	Juha Tiainen (FIN)				71.16 m	
19	B	Walter Ciofani (FRA)				70.84 m	
20	A	Kjell Bystedt (SWE)				68.32 m	
21	B	Raúl Jimeno (ESP)				65.62 m	

== Final ==
Rank	Athlete	Attempts						Distance	Note
Rank	Athlete	1	2	3	4	5	6	Distance	Note
1st place, gold medalist(s)	Yuri Sedykh (URS)	83.94	85.28	85.46	86.74	86.68	86.62	86.74 m	WR
2nd place, silver medalist(s)	Sergey Litvinov (URS)	85.74	81.60	X	X	82.12	80.44	85.74 m	
3rd place, bronze medalist(s)	Igor Nikulin (URS)	79.44	81.04	X	X	82.00	79.96	82.00 m	
4	Günther Rodehau (GDR)	78.14	77.44	79.10	79.84	79.66	74.34	79.84 m	
5	Jörg Schäfer (FRG)	X	73.32	76.34	77.16	79.68	79.36	79.68 m	
6	Ralf Haber (GDR)	77.06	77.02	X	76.76	78.74	78.40	78.74 m	
7	Matthias Moder (GDR)	78.70	X	78.50	77.90	77.12	73.98	78.70 m	
8	Christoph Sahner (FRG)	76.12	X	X	X	77.12	X	77.12 m	
9	Klaus Ploghaus (FRG)							75.36 m	
10	Harri Huhtala (FIN)							74.94 m	
11	Johann Lindner (AUT)							74.32 m	
12	Tore Gustafsson (SWE)							69.94 m	

== Participation ==
According to an unofficial count, 21 athletes from 11 countries participated in the event.

- Austria (2)
- Bulgaria (2)
- East Germany (3)
- Finland (2)
- France (1)
- Poland (1)
- Soviet Union (3)
- Spain (1)
- Sweden (2)
- United Kingdom (1)
- West Germany (3)

== See also ==
- 1983 Men's World Championships Hammer Throw (Helsinki)
- 1984 Men's Olympic Hammer Throw (Los Angeles)
- 1986 Hammer Throw Year Ranking
- 1987 Men's World Championships Hammer Throw (Rome)
- 1988 Men's Olympic Hammer Throw (Seoul)
