= Karl-Hans Riehm =

German hammer thrower

Personal information
- Born: 31 May 1951 (age 75) Konz, Rhineland-Palatinate, West Germany
- Height: 1.95 m (6 ft 5 in)
- Weight: 112 kg (247 lb)

Sport
- Country: West Germany
- Sport: Men's athletics
- Event: Men's Hammer throw
- Club: SV Germania Trier; TV Wattenscheid

Achievements and titles
- Personal best: 80.80 m (1980)
Medal record
Men's athletics
Representing West Germany
Olympic Games
Silver medal – second place	1984 Los Angeles	Hammer throw
European Championships
Bronze medal – third place	1978 Prague	Hammer throw

Karl-Hans Riehm (born 31 May 1951 in Konz, Rhineland-Palatinate) is a former West German hammer thrower.

His biggest success came at the 1984 Summer Olympics held in Los Angeles, United States where he won the silver medal. At the previous Olympics he had a tenth place from 1972 and a fourth place from 1976. In addition he won the bronze medal at the 1978 European Championships and finished seventh at the 1983 World Championships.

His personal best throw was 80.80 metres, achieved in July 1980 in Rhede. This ranks him tenth among German hammer throwers, behind Ralf Haber, Heinz Weis, Karsten Kobs, Günther Rodehau, Holger Klose, Christoph Sahner, Klaus Ploghaus, Markus Esser and Matthias Moder.

Records
Preceded by Aleksey Spiridonov; Boris Zaychuk	Men's Hammer World Record Holder; 19 May 1975 – 14 August 1975; 6 August 1978 – 16 May 1980	Succeeded by Walter Schmidt; Yuriy Sedykh
