= 1987 World Championships in Athletics – Men's hammer throw =

These are the official results of the Men's Hammer Throw event at the 1987 World Championships in Rome, Italy. There were a total of 26 participating athletes, with the final held on Tuesday September 1, 1987. The qualification round was staged on Monday August 31, 1987, with the mark set at 80.00 metres.

== Medalists ==
| Gold | Sergey Litvinov; Soviet Union (URS) |
| Silver | Jüri Tamm; Soviet Union (URS) |
| Bronze | Ralf Haber; East Germany (GDR) |

== Schedule ==
- All times are Central European Time (UTC+1)

Qualification Round
| Group A | Group B |
|---|---|
| 31.08.1987 – ??:??h | 31.08.1987 – ??:??h |
Final Round
01.09.1987 – 15:00h

== Abbreviations ==
- All results shown are in metres

| Q | automatic qualification |
| q | qualification by rank |
| DNS | did not start |
| NM | no mark |
| WR | world record |
| AR | area record |
| NR | national record |
| PB | personal best |
| SB | season best |

== Records ==
Standing records prior to the 1987 World Athletics Championships
| World Record | Yuriy Sedykh (URS) | 86.74 m | August 30, 1986 | Stuttgart, West Germany |
| Event Record | Sergey Litvinov (URS) | 82.68 m | August 9, 1983 | Helsinki, Finland |
| Season Best | Sergey Litvinov (URS) | 83.48 m | June 21, 1987 | Karl-Marx-Stadt, East Germany |
Broken records during the 1987 World Athletics Championships
| Event Record | Sergey Litvinov (URS) | 83.06 m | September 1, 1987 | Rome, Italy |

== Qualification ==
=== Group A ===
| Rank | Overall | Athlete | Attempts | | | Distance |
| Rank | Overall | Athlete | 1 | 2 | 3 | Distance |
|---|---|---|---|---|---|---|
| 1 | 1 | Sergey Litvinov (URS) | | | | 81.78 m |
| 2 | 9 | Walter Ciofani (FRA) | | | | 76.12 m |
| 3 | 10 | Günther Rodehau (GDR) | | | | 76.06 m |
| 4 | 12 | Plamen Minev (BUL) | | | | 75.18 m |
| 5 | 13 | Juha Tiainen (FIN) | | | | 75.10 m |
| 6 | 14 | Jud Logan (USA) | | | | 74.80 m |
| 7 | 15 | Kjell Bystedt (SWE) | | | | 74.46 m |
| 8 | 16 | Lucio Serrani (ITA) | | | | 74.00 m |
| 9 | 17 | Jörg Schäfer (FRG) | | | | 73.58 m |
| 10 | 19 | Viktor Apostolov (BUL) | | | | 73.46 m |
| 11 | 21 | Michael Beierl (AUT) | | | | 72.70 m |
| 12 | 24 | Andrés Charadia (ARG) | | | | 63.70 m |
| 13 | 25 | Gary Halpin (IRL) | | | | 63.68 m |

=== Group B ===
| Rank | Overall | Athlete | Attempts | | | Distance |
| Rank | Overall | Athlete | 1 | 2 | 3 | Distance |
|---|---|---|---|---|---|---|
| 1 | 2 | Ralf Haber (GDR) | | | | 79.46 m |
| 2 | 3 | Igor Nikulin (URS) | | | | 78.60 m |
| 3 | 4 | Heinz Weis (FRG) | | | | 77.78 m |
| 4 | 5 | Tibor Gécsek (HUN) | | | | 77.52 m |
| 5 | 6 | Jüri Tamm (URS) | | | | 77.42 m |
| 6 | 7 | Christoph Sahner (FRG) | | | | 77.02 m |
| 7 | 8 | Ivan Tanev (BUL) | | | | 76.50 m |
| 8 | 11 | Harri Huhtala (FIN) | | | | 75.64 m |
| 9 | 18 | Tore Gustafsson (SWE) | | | | 73.54 m |
| 10 | 20 | Ken Flax (USA) | | | | 73.36 m |
| 11 | 22 | Francisco Fuentes (ESP) | | | | 69.54 m |
| 12 | 23 | Dave Smith (GBR) | | | | 68.56 m |
| 13 | 26 | Angus Cooper (NZL) | | | | 63.64 m |

== Final ==
| Rank | Athlete | Attempts | | | | | | Distance | Note |
| Rank | Athlete | 1 | 2 | 3 | 4 | 5 | 6 | Distance | Note |
|---|---|---|---|---|---|---|---|---|---|
| 1st place, gold medalist(s) | Sergey Litvinov (URS) | 74.76 | 83.06 | 80.58 | 81.50 | X | 80.64 | 83.06 m | CR |
| 2nd place, silver medalist(s) | Jüri Tamm (URS) | 78.38 | 77.94 | X | 76.88 | 78.18 | 80.84 | 80.84 m | |
| 3rd place, bronze medalist(s) | Ralf Haber (GDR) | X | 77.92 | 78.94 | 79.18 | 80.76 | 78.78 | 80.76 m | |
| 4 | Christoph Sahner (FRG) | 72.38 | 75.80 | 76.68 | 77.32 | 79.50 | 80.58 | 80.58 m | |
| 5 | Igor Nikulin (URS) | 76.62 | 78.74 | 79.48 | 78.18 | 80.18 | 80.00 | 80.18 m | |
| 6 | Heinz Weis (FRG) | 77.70 | 79.02 | 78.36 | 79.26 | 80.18 | 78.76 | 80.18 m | |
| 7 | Tibor Gécsek (HUN) | 76.54 | 75.80 | 77.34 | 77.56 | 74.94 | 76.94 | 77.56 m | |
| 8 | Plamen Minev (BUL) | 75.16 | 77.06 | X | X | X | X | 77.06 m | |
| 9 | Günther Rodehau (GDR) | | | | | | | 76.18 m | |
| 10 | Ivan Tanev (BUL) | | | | | | | 76.00 m | |
| 11 | Walter Ciofani (FRA) | | | | | | | 75.34 m | |
| 12 | Harri Huhtala (FIN) | | | | | | | 74.98 m | |

== See also ==
- 1984 Men's Olympic Hammer Throw (Los Angeles)
- 1986 Men's European Championships Hammer Throw (Stuttgart)
- 1987 Hammer Throw Year Ranking
- 1988 Men's Olympic Hammer Throw (Seoul)
- 1990 Men's European Championships Hammer Throw (Split)
