= Christoph Sahner =

German hammer thrower (born 1963)

Personal information
- Born: September 23, 1963 (age 62) Illingen, Saarland, West Germany
- Height: 1.80 m (5 ft 11 in)
- Weight: 103 kg (227 lb)

Sport
- Country: West Germany
- Sport: Men's Athletics
- Event: Men's Hammer throw
- Club: TV Wattenscheid

Achievements and titles
- Personal best: 81.78 (1988)

Christoph Sahner (born September 23, 1963 in Illingen) is a retired male hammer thrower, who represented West Germany during his career.

His personal best throw was 81.78 metres, achieved in September 1988 in Wemmetsweiler. This ranks him sixth among German hammer throwers, behind Ralf Haber, Heinz Weis, Karsten Kobs, Günther Rodehau and Holger Klose.

== International competitions ==
Year	Competition	Venue	Position	Notes
Representing West Germany
1981	European Junior Championships	Utrecht, Netherlands	1st	68.92 m
1982	European Championships	Athens, Greece	19th	69.24 m
1983	World Championships	Helsinki, Finland	11th	72.86 m
1984	Olympic Games	Los Angeles, United States	—	NM
1986	European Championships	Stuttgart, West Germany	8th	77.12 m
1987	World Championships	Rome, Italy	4th	80.58 m
1988	Olympic Games	Seoul, South Korea	13th	75.84 m
