= Walter Ciofani =

French hammer thrower

Walter Ciofani (born 17 February 1962 in Sedan, Ardennes) is a retired French hammer thrower. His personal best throw is 78.50 metres, achieved in May 1985 in Bourg-en-Bresse.

== Achievements ==
Year	Competition	Venue	Position	Notes
Representing France
1984	Olympic Games	Los Angeles, United States	7th	71.86 m
1986	European Championships	Stuttgart, West Germany	19th	70.84 m
1987	World Championships	Rome, Italy	11th	75.34 m
1989	Jeux de la Francophonie	Casablanca, Morocco	2nd	72.18 m
1991	World Championships	Tokyo, Japan	6th	76.48 m
1993	World Championships	Stuttgart, Germany	14th	73.36 m
1994	Jeux de la Francophonie	Paris-Évry, France	3rd	71.72 m
