= Jud Logan =

American hammer thrower (1959–2022)

Personal information
- Born: Judson Campbell Logan; July 19, 1959
- Died: January 3, 2022 (aged 62) Ashland, Ohio, U.S.
- Education: Kent State University
Medal record
Men's athletics
Representing United States
Gold medal – first place	1987 Indianapolis	Hammer throw
Silver medal – second place	1991 Havana	Hammer throw

Judson Campbell Logan (July 19, 1959 – January 3, 2022) was an American athlete. He won a gold medal in the hammer throw at the 1987 Pan American Games in Indianapolis. Logan competed in four Summer Olympics, starting in 1984. His best finish was 13th in the qualifying round in 1984. At the 1992 Olympic Games in Barcelona, Spain he failed the doping test for performance enhancing drugs, and was suspended from competition for two years.

== Biography ==
Logan had bests of 49-11 (SP) and 171-11 (DT) in high school, but did not qualify for the state meet. He is quoted of saying, "And I made it to four Olympics. That's what I tell kids now: never give up on your dreams."

He played tight end in high school at Hoover High School, before attending Kent State University and playing football for two and a half seasons. He was but a walk-on to the track team and was known to give his medals away to children who watch the competition, saying "I'm not into collecting or saving medals. Maybe it will mean more to them than it will to me. But it makes me feel good."

He was for a time, the oldest top-level U.S. track star. After turning 40 in 1999, Logan was still determined to continue throwing.

"I'm going to keep throwing until there are three guys who can keep me off the Olympic team. As long as I can make the A standards for the Worlds and Olympics, and keep making teams, I'm going to keep doing it." Following that statement he made his fourth Olympic team and threw in the 2000 Summer Olympics. He had continued throwing into the Masters division, setting the world M50 record in 2009.

Logan won the British AAA Championships title in the hammer throw event at the 1989 AAA Championships.

=== Later life ===
Logan resided in Ashland, Ohio, where he coached the Ashland University track team. He became head coach in 2004 and was named Indoor Men's Coach of the Year in the Great Lakes Intercollegiate Athletic Conference in 2008–09.

He died from complications of COVID-19 in Ashland on January 3, 2022, at age 62. He was also being treated for leukemia for the two years prior to his death.

== Achievements ==
Year	Competition	Venue	Position	Notes
Representing the United States
1984	Olympic Games	Los Angeles, United States	13th	71.18 m
1986	Goodwill Games	Moscow, Soviet Union	7th	74.78 m
1987	Pan American Games	Indianapolis, United States	1st	77.24 m
1987	World Championships	Rome, Italy	14th	74.80 m
1988	Olympic Games	Seoul, South Korea	19th	72.64 m
1991	Pan American Games	Havana, Cuba	2nd	70.32 m
1991	World Championships	Tokyo, Japan	19th	70.04 m
1992	Olympic Games	Barcelona, Spain		DQ
1997	World Championships	Athens, Greece	25th	71.92 m
2000	Olympic Games	Sydney, Australia	39th	68.42 m
