= Roland Steuk =

East German hammer thrower

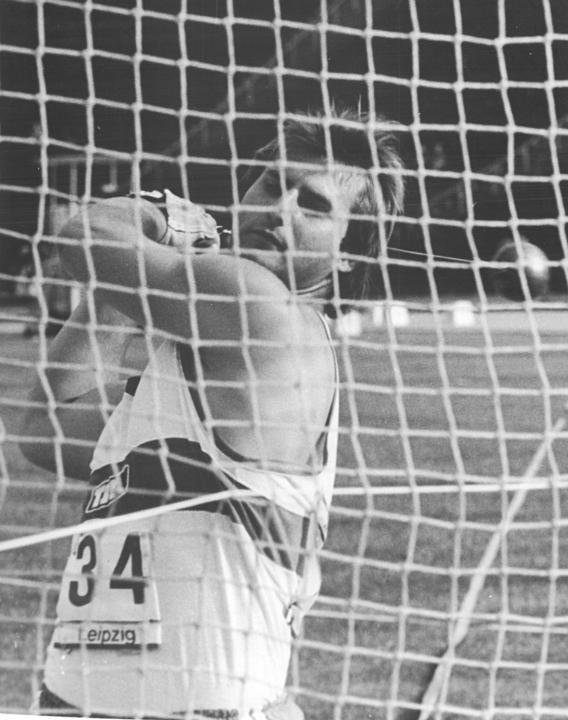
- Roland Steuk in 1978.

Personal information
- Born: March 5, 1959 (age 67) East Berlin, East Germany
- Height: 1.88 m (6 ft 2 in)
- Weight: 120 kg (265 lb)

Sport
- Country: East Germany
- Sport: Men's athletics
- Event: Men's Hammer throw
- Club: Berliner TSC

Achievements and titles
- Personal best: 79.90 m (1984)
Medal record
Men's athletics
Representing East Germany
European Championships
Silver medal – second place	1978 Prague	Hammer

Roland Steuk (born 5 March 1959 in Berlin) is a retired East German hammer thrower.

At the 1977 European Athletics Junior Championships he won the hammer throw and took a silver medal in shot put. On the senior level he won the silver medal at the 1978 European Athletics Championships, finished fourth at the 1980 Summer Olympics, seventh at the 1982 European Athletics Championships and twelfth at the 1983 World Championships.

Representing the sports team TSC Berlin, he became East German champion six years in a row in the years 1978–1983.

== International competitions ==
Year	Competition	Venue	Position	Notes
Representing East Germany
1982	European Championships	Athens, Greece	7th	74.76 m
1983	World Championships	Helsinki, Finland	12th	72.10 m
