= Jörg Schäfer =

German hammer thrower (born 1959)

Jörg Schäfer (born 17 July 1959) is a retired West German hammer thrower.

He finished fifth at the 1986 European Championships. He also competed at the 1987 World Championships without reaching the final. Schäfer represented the sports club TV Wattenscheid, and became West German champion in 1987.

== International competitions ==
Year	Competition	Venue	Position	Notes
Representing West Germany
1982	European Championships	Athens, Greece	9th	74.08 m
1987	World Championships	Rome, Italy	17th	73.58 m
