= Tore Gustafsson =

Swedish hammer thrower

Lars Tore Gustafsson (born 11 February 1962) is a Swedish retired hammer thrower, who competed at three consecutive Summer Olympics, starting in 1988 (Seoul, South Korea). Since his retirement from competition, he has enjoyed success as a hammer coach.

== Competitive career ==
Competing for the Washington State Cougars track and field team, Gustafsson won the 1985 NCAA Division I Outdoor Track and Field Championships in the hammer throw.

A member of the Mölndals Almänna Idrottsklubb he set the national record at 80.14 metres on 4 July 1989, in Lappeenranta, Finland. Gustafsson lives in Los Gatos, California, and works as a chiropractor.

== Coaching ==
Gustafsson has been involved in coaching since he retired. Koji Murofushi won the gold medal at 2011 World Championships in Daegu, South Korea, and bronze medal at the 2012 London Olympics with Gustafsson as his Coach. In 2016, another of his athletes, Great Britain's Sophie Hitchon, won bronze in the hammer at the 2016 Olympic Games, her country's first ever global medal in that discipline.2018 coached (Nick Miller GB) to win Gold and National record 80.26 at the (Commonwealth games in Australia)). (Nick Miller) finished 6th at the (2020 Summer Olympics)

== Achievements ==
| Year | Competition | Venue | Position | Notes |
Representing Sweden
| 1981 | European Junior Championships | Utrecht, Netherlands | 6th | 66.64 m |
| 1986 | European Championships | Stuttgart, West Germany | 12th | 69.94 m |
| 1986 | Goodwill Games | Moscow, Soviet Union | 9th | 74.40 m |
| 1987 | World Championships | Rome, Italy | 18th | 73.54 m |
| 1988 | Olympic Games | Seoul, South Korea | 11th | 74.24 m |
| 1990 | European Championships | Split, Yugoslavia | 13th | 72.86 m |
| 1992 | Olympic Games | Barcelona, Spain | 15th | 73.52 m |
| 1993 | World Championships | Stuttgart, Germany | 15th | 71.88 m |
| 1994 | European Championships | Helsinki, Finland | 20th | 71.90 m |
| 1995 | World Championships | Gothenburg, Sweden | 13th | 74.44 m |
| 1996 | Olympic Games | Atlanta, United States | 30th | 71.02 m |
