= Viktor Apostolov =

Bulgarian hammer thrower

Viktor Apostolov (Bulgarian: Виктор Апостолов; 1 November 1962 – 30 October 2011) was a male hammer thrower from Bulgaria, who represented his native country at the 1988 Summer Olympics in Seoul, South Korea. He set his personal best (80.62 metres) on 28 July 1990 in Sofia.

== Achievements ==
Year	Competition	Venue	Position	Notes
Representing Bulgaria
1987	World Championships	Rome, Italy	19th	73.46 m
1988	Olympic Games	Seoul, South Korea	20th	71.10 m
1990	European Championships	Split, SFR Yugoslavia	19th	68.92 m
