= Matthias Moder =

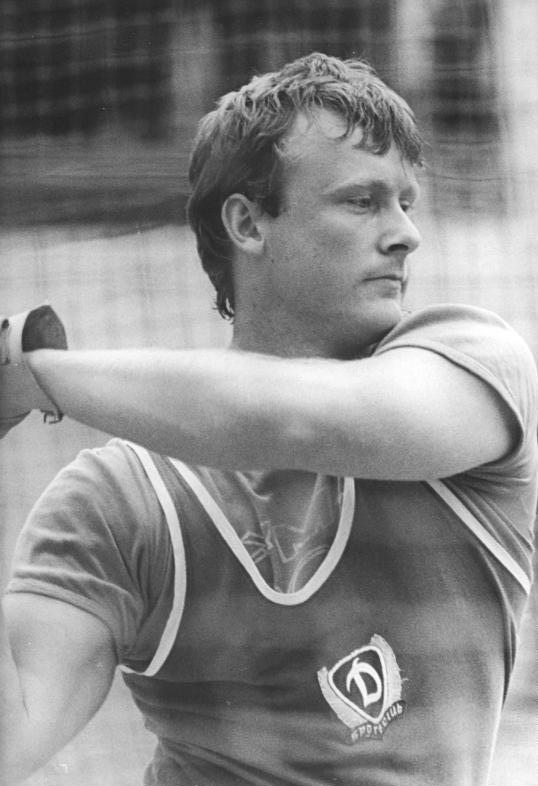
- Matthias Moder during his record setting Halle competition in 1985.

Personal information
- Born: June 17, 1963 (age 63) Torgau, Saxony, East Germany
- Height: 1.84 m (6 ft 0 in)
- Weight: 110 kg (243 lb)

Sport
- Country: East Germany
- Sport: Men's Athletics
- Event: Men's Hammer throw
- Club: SC Dynamo Berlin

Achievements and titles
- Personal best: 80.92 (1985)

Matthias Moder (born 17 June 1963 in Torgau) is a retired East German hammer thrower.

He finished seventh at the 1986 European Championships. Moder represented the sports club SC Dynamo Berlin, and became East German champion in 1985.

His personal best throw was 80.92 metres, achieved in June 1985 in Halle, Germany.
