= Holger Klose =

German hammer thrower (born 1972)

Personal information
- Born: December 5, 1972 (age 53) Bitburg, Rhineland-Pfalz, West Germany

Sport
- Country: Germany
- Sport: Men's Athletics
- Event: Hammer throw
- Club: Eintracht Frankfurt

Achievements and titles
- Personal best: 82.22 (1998)

Holger Klose (born 5 December 1972 in Bitburg, Rhineland-Palatinate) is a retired male hammer thrower from Germany. His personal best throw is 82.22 metres, achieved in May 1998 in Dortmund. This ranks him fifth among German hammer throwers, behind Ralf Haber, Heinz Weis, Karsten Kobs and Günther Rodehau. Klose represented Eintracht Frankfurt.

== Personal life ==
His son Sören Klose is also an Olympic hammer thrower.

== International competitions ==
Year	Competition	Venue	Position	Notes
Representing Germany
1997	World Championships	Athens, Greece	13th	75.16 m
1998	European Championships	Budapest, Hungary	17th	74.05 m
1999	World Championships	Seville, Spain	—	NM
2001	World Championships	Edmonton, Canada	25th	74.02 m
2002	European Championships	Munich, Germany	17th	76.98 m
2005	World Championships	Helsinki, Finland	10th	74.80 m
