= Zdzisław Kwaśny =

Polish hammer thrower

Personal information
- Nationality: Polish
- Born: 6 November 1960 (age 65) Kwilcz, Poland

Sport
- Country: Poland
- Sport: Track and field
- Event: Hammer throw
Medal record
Representing Poland
World Championships
Bronze medal – third place	1983 Helsinki	Hammer

Zdzisław Kwaśny (born November 6, 1960) is a retired hammer thrower from Poland, who is best known for winning the bronze medal in the men's hammer throw event at the inaugural 1983 World Championships. He set his personal best (80.18 m) in the same event on 1983-08-21 at a meet in London, United Kingdom.

== Achievements ==
Year	Competition	Venue	Position	Notes
Representing Poland
1983	World Championships	Helsinki, Finland	3rd	79.42 m
