= Klaus Ploghaus =

German hammer thrower (1956–2022)

Personal information
- Born: 31 January 1956 Gelnhausen, West Germany
- Died: 11 January 2022 (aged 65)
- Height: 1.86 m (6 ft 1 in)
- Weight: 110 kg (243 lb)

Sport
- Country: West Germany
- Sport: Men's Athletics
- Event: Men's Hammer throw
- Club: Bayer Leverkusen

Achievements and titles
- Personal best: 81.32 m (1986)
Medal record
Men's athletics
Representing West Germany
Olympic Games
Bronze medal – third place	1984 Los Angeles	Hammer throw
Universiade
Gold medal – first place	1979 Mexico City	Hammer throw
Gold medal – first place	1981 Bucharest	Hammer throw

Klaus Dieter Ploghaus (31 January 1956 – 11 January 2022) was a West German hammer thrower. He was born in Gelnhausen, Hesse.

His biggest success came at the 1984 Summer Olympics held in Los Angeles, United States where he won the bronze medal. In addition he finished twelfth at the 1978 European Championships, eighth at the 1982 European Championships, sixth at the 1983 World Championships and ninth at the 1986 European Championships.

His personal best throw was 81.32 metres, achieved in May 1986 in Paderborn. This ranks him seventh among German hammer throwers, behind Ralf Haber, Heinz Weis, Karsten Kobs, Günther Rodehau, Holger Klose and Christoph Sahner.

Ploghaus died on 11 January 2022, at the age of 65.
