= Declan Hegarty =

Irish hammer thrower

Personal information
- Nationality: Irish
- Born: 12 October 1960 (age 65) Dublin, Ireland
- Height: 183 cm (6 ft 0 in)
- Weight: 102 kg (225 lb)

Sport
- Sport: Athletics
- Event: Hammer throw
- Club: Boston University Terriers

Declan Hegarty is an Irish Olympic hammer thrower. He represented his country at the 1984 Summer Olympics. His best toss in those Olympics was a 70.56, while his personal best, set in 1985, was a 77.80.

Hegarty finished second behind David Smith in the hammer throw event at the British 1985 AAA Championships.
