= Juha Tiainen =

Finnish hammer thrower (1955–2003)

Personal information
- Nationality: Finnish
- Born: December 5, 1955 Uukuniemi, Finland
- Died: April 27, 2003 (aged 47) Lappeenranta, Finland
- Height: 1.83 m (6 ft 0 in)
- Weight: 108 kg (238 lb)

Sport
- Country: Finland
- Sport: Athletics
- Event: Hammer throw

Achievements and titles
- Personal best: 81.52 m (1984)
Medal record
Representing Finland
Men's Athletics
Olympic Games
Gold medal – first place	1984 Los Angeles	Hammer throw

Juha Tiainen (December 5, 1955 in Uukuniemi – April 27, 2003 in Lappeenranta) was a hammer thrower from Finland who won the gold medal at the 1984 Summer Olympics. The same year he achieved his personal best throw, 81.52 metres.

== Achievements ==
Year	Competition	Venue	Position	Notes
Representing Finland
1982	European Championships	Athens, Greece	12th	72.12 m
1983	World Championships	Helsinki, Finland	9th	75.60 m
1984	Olympic Games	Los Angeles, California	1st	78.08 m
1986	European Championships	Stuttgart, West Germany	18th	71.16 m
1987	World Championships	Rome, Italy	13th	75.10 m
1988	Olympic Games	Seoul, South Korea	16th	73.24 m
1990	European Championships	Split, Yugoslavia	9th	73.70 m
