= Ivan Tanev =

Bulgarian hammer thrower

Personal information
- Born: May 1, 1957 (age 69) Sofia, Bulgaria

Sport
- Sport: Track and field

Ivan Krastev Tanev (Bulgarian: Иван Кръстев Танев; born May 1, 1957) is a former hammer thrower from Bulgaria, who competed for his native country at two consecutive Summer Olympics, starting in 1988. He set his personal best (82.08 metres) in 1988.

== Achievements ==
Year	Competition	Venue	Position	Notes
Representing Bulgaria
1986	European Championships	Stuttgart, West Germany	14th	75.02 m
1987	World Championships	Rome, Italy	10th	76.00 m
1988	Olympic Games	Seoul, South Korea	8th	76.08 m
1990	European Championships	Split, Yugoslavia	6th	76.28 m
1991	World Championships	Tokyo, Japan	15th	72.52 m
1992	Olympic Games	Barcelona, Spain	17th	72.62 m
