= Igor Nikulin (hammer thrower) =

Soviet hammer thrower (1960–2021)

Personal information
- Native name: Игорь Юрьевич Никуԓин
- Full name: Igor Yuriyevich Nikulin
- Nationality: Russian
- Born: 14 August 1960 Moscow, Russian SFSR, Soviet Union
- Died: 7 November 2021 (aged 61) Saint Petersburg, Russia
- Height: 1.91 m (6 ft 3 in)
- Weight: 120 kg (265 lb)

Sport
- Country: Soviet Union; Russia
- Sport: Men's Athletics
- Event: Hammer throw
- Club: SA St. Petersburg

Achievements and titles
- Personal best: 84.48 m (1990)
Medal record
Men's athletics
Representing Unified Team
Olympic Games
| Bronze medal – third place | 1992 Barcelona | Hammer throw |
Representing Soviet Union
European Championships
| Silver medal – second place | 1982 Athens | Hammer throw |
| Bronze medal – third place | 1986 Stuttgart | Hammer throw |
| Bronze medal – third place | 1990 Split | Hammer throw |
Universiade
| Bronze medal – third place | 1981 Bucharest | Hammer throw |
| Bronze medal – third place | 1985 Kobe | Hammer throw |

Igor Yuriyevich Nikulin (Russian: Игорь Юрьевич Никулин; 14 August 1960 – 7 November 2021) was a hammer thrower who represented the USSR, the Unified Team, and later Russia. He won the bronze medal at the 1992 Olympic Games in Barcelona, Spain.

Nikulin's U23 world record of 83.54 m, set 2 September 1982 in Athens, put him 2nd in the world of all time behind Sergey Litvinov's 83.98 m. His personal best of 84.48 m was set on 12 July 1990 in Lausanne currently putting him 7th of all time. His father Yuriy Nikulin finished fourth at the men's hammer throw at the 1964 Summer Olympics.

Nikulin died on 7 November 2021, at the age of 61.

== International competitions ==
| Year | Competition | Venue | Position | Notes |
Representing the Soviet Union
| 1979 | European Junior Championships | Bydgoszcz, Poland | 1st | 71.56 m |
| 1982 | European Championships | Athens, Greece | 2nd | 79.44 m |
| 1983 | World Championships | Helsinki, Finland | 4th | 79.34 m |
| 1984 | Friendship Games | Moscow, Soviet Union | 2nd | 82.56 m |
| 1986 | Goodwill Games | Moscow, Soviet Union | 5th | 78.50 m |
| 1986 | European Championships | Stuttgart, West Germany | 3rd | 82.00 m |
| 1987 | World Championships | Rome, Italy | 5th | 80.18 m |
| 1990 | Goodwill Games | Seattle, United States | 3rd | 82.14 m |
| 1990 | European Championships | Split, Yugoslavia | 3rd | 80.02 m |
Representing Unified Team
| 1992 | Olympic Games | Barcelona, Spain | 3rd | 81.38 m |
| 1992 | IAAF World Cup | Havana, Cuba | 2nd | 78.28 m |
Representing Russia
| 1994 | European Championships | Helsinki, Finland | 4th | 78.38 m |
