= József Vida =

Hungarian hammer thrower

József Vida (born January 9, 1963) is a retired male hammer thrower from Hungary, who represented his native country at the 1988 Summer Olympics in Seoul, South Korea. He set his personal best (76.01 metres) on July 4, 1999, in Tapolca.

== Achievements ==
Year	Competition	Venue	Position	Notes
Representing Hungary
1988	Olympic Games	Seoul, South Korea	15th	74.30 m
1990	European Championships	Split, Yugoslavia	15th	72.46 m
