= Imre Szitás =

Hungarian hammer thrower

Imre Szitás (born September 4, 1961 in Mosonmagyaróvár, Győr-Moson-Sopron) is a retired male hammer thrower from Hungary, who represented his native country at the 1988 Summer Olympics in Seoul, South Korea. He set his personal best (80.60 metres) on July 11, 1988 in Szombathely.

== Achievements ==
Year	Competition	Venue	Position	Notes
Representing Hungary
1988	Olympic Games	Seoul, South Korea	7th	77.04 m
1991	World Championships	Tokyo, Japan	17th	71.92 m
