= Emanuil Dyulgerov =

Bulgarian hammer thrower (1955–2023)

Personal information
- Born: 7 February 1955 Razgrad, Bulgaria
- Died: 26 June 2023 (aged 68) Sofia, Bulgaria

Sport
- Sport: Track and field
Medal record
Representing Bulgaria
Summer Universiade
Gold medal – first place	1977 Sofia	Hammer throw

Emanuil Atanasov Dyulgerov (Bulgarian: Емануил Атанасов Дюлгеров; 7 February 1955 – 26 June 2023) was a hammer thrower from Bulgaria, who competed for his native country at the 1980 Summer Olympics. He set his personal best (80.64 metres) in 1984. He lived in Sofia and worked as an athletics trainer. He has two daughters, called Stela Dyulgerova and Violeta Dyulgerova.

== Achievements ==
Year	Competition	Venue	Position	Notes
Representing Bulgaria
1977	Universiade	Sofia, Bulgaria	1st	73.50 m
1978	European Championships	Prague, Czechoslovakia	14th	68.96 m
1980	Olympic Games	Moscow, Soviet Union	6th	74.04 m
1982	European Championships	Athens, Greece	13th	71.16 m
1983	World Championships	Helsinki, Finland	8th	76.64 m
1986	European Championships	Stuttgart, West Germany	15th	73.80 m
