= Harri Huhtala =

Finnish hammer thrower

Harri Hilmer Huhtala (born August 13, 1952, in Paattinen) is a former hammer thrower from Finland, who competed in three consecutive Summer Olympics for his native country, starting in 1980.

== Achievements ==
Year	Competition	Venue	Position	Notes
Representing Finland
1980	Olympic Games	Moscow, Soviet Union	9th	71.96 m
1982	European Championships	Athens, Greece	5th	76.12 m
1983	World Championships	Helsinki, Finland	10th	75.46 m
1984	Olympic Games	Los Angeles, United States	6th	75.28 m
1986	European Championships	Stuttgart, West Germany	10th	74.94 m
1987	World Championships	Rome, Italy	12th	74.98 m
1988	Olympic Games	Seoul, South Korea	9th	75.38 m
