= Jüri Tamm =

Estonian hammer thrower and politician (1957–2021)

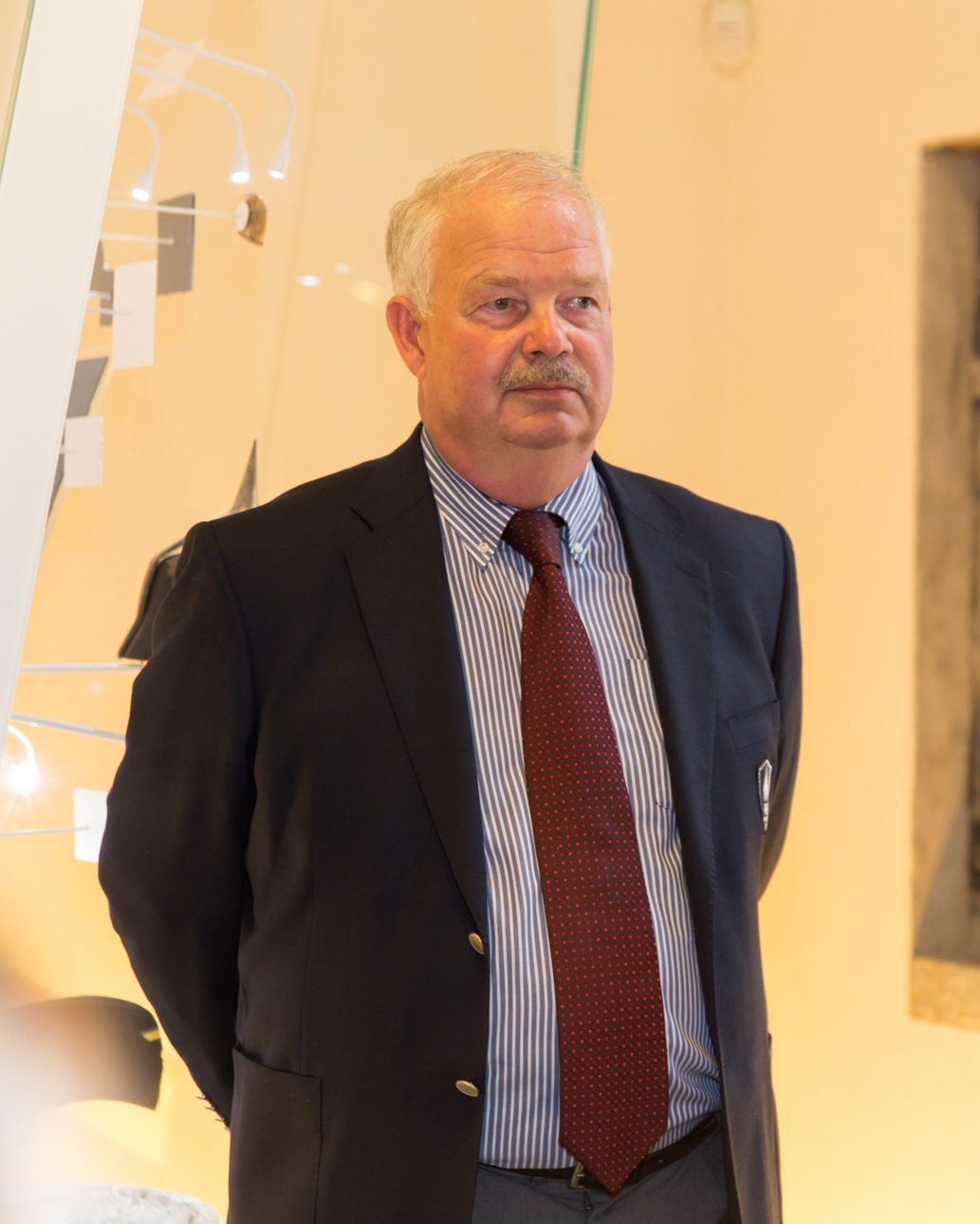
- Tamm in 2017

Personal information
- Nationality: Estonian
- Born: 5 February 1957 Pärnu, then part of Estonian SSR, Soviet Union
- Died: 22 September 2021 (aged 64) Estonia
- Height: 1.91 m (6 ft 3 in)
- Weight: 120 kg (265 lb)

Sport
- Country: Soviet Union; Estonia
- Sport: Athletics
- Event: Hammer throw

Achievements and titles
- Personal best: 84.40 m (1984)
Medal record
Men's athletics
Representing the Soviet Union
Olympic Games
Bronze medal – third place	1980 Moscow	Hammer
Bronze medal – third place	1988 Seoul	Hammer
World Championships
Silver medal – second place	1987 Rome	Hammer
Universiade
Gold medal – first place	1983 Edmonton	Hammer
Silver medal – second place	1981 Bucharest	Hammer

Jüri Tamm (5 February 1957 – 22 September 2021) was an Estonian hammer thrower and politician. In his sporting career Tamm represented the Soviet Union, he won a bronze medal in the 1980 and 1988 Summer Olympics and a silver medal at the 1987 World Championships in Athletics. He set the world record for the hammer in 1980. Tamm was member of Estonian parliament Riigikogu from 2007 to 2011 as a member of the Social Democratic Party.

== Athletic career ==
Tamm held the world record in hammer throw with 80.46 metres for a brief period in 1980, although his record was soon overcome by teammates Yuriy Sedykh and Sergey Litvinov. Tamm's personal best throw, 84.40 metres, was achieved in 1984.

He finished 5th at the 1992 Summer Olympics, now representing the restored independent Estonia.

== Political career ==
In 1998 Tamm entered political life. He was elected three times into the Parliament of Estonia in 1999–2003 (the Economic Affairs Committee), in 2003–2007 (the Economic Affairs Committee) and in 2007–2011 (the Economic Affairs Committee and European Union Affairs Committee, Security Authorities Surveillance Select Committee in Parliament of Estonia), for the Social Democratic Party. In 2010 he withdrew from the Social Democratic Party (SDE) and left politics.

He was the Vice President of the Estonian Olympic Committee from 2001 until 2008, co-founder of the World Olympians Association (WOA) and from 1998 to 2021, the Chair of Eesti Sportlaste Ühendus (Estonian Olympians Union), from 2001 to 2005 Chairman of the European Olympic Committees (EOC) Athletes’ Commission, member of EOC Executive Board. From 2012 to 2015 he was Chief of Staff in Ukraine National Olympic Committee and from May 2016 till 2021, the Vice President of the Estonian Olympic Committee and Chair of the European Olympic Committees EU Commission. He was co-founder and head of the Electric Marathon, Pan-European annual race for battery electric vehicles (BEV) under the patronage of His Serene Highness Prince of Monaco Albert II and from 2007 to 2021 Honorary Consul of the Principality of Monaco in Estonia.

He was also awarded 2003 Orden del Merito Civil, “Cruz de Oficial” Spain, 2006 "White Star Orden” IV, Estonia.

Records
Preceded by (Soviet Union) Yuriy Sedykh	Men's hammer throw world record holder 16 May 1980	Succeeded by (Soviet Union) Yuriy Sedykh
