= Günther Rodehau =

East German hammer thrower

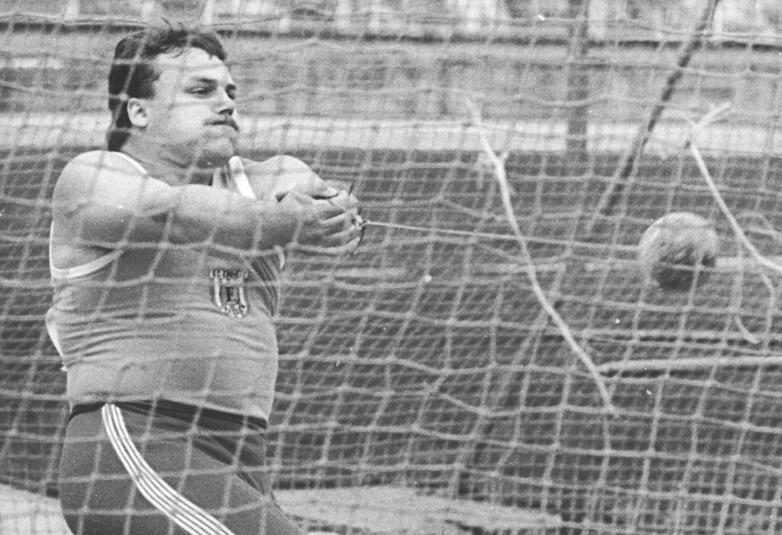
- Günther Rodehau in 1985

Personal information
- Born: Gerhard Günther Rodehau; July 6, 1959 (age 67) Meissen, East Germany
- Height: 1.79 m (5 ft 10 in)
- Weight: 115 kg (254 lb)

Sport
- Country: East Germany
- Sport: Track and Field
- Event: Hammer throw
- Club: SC Einheit Dresden

Achievements and titles
- Personal best: 82.64 m (1985)

Gerhard Günther Rodehau (born 6 July 1959 in Meißen, Saxony) is a retired East German hammer thrower.

Rodehau represented the sports club SC Einheit Dresden, and became East German champion in 1986 and 1990.

His personal best throw was 82.64 metres, achieved in August 1985 in Dresden. This ranks him fourth among German hammer throwers, behind Ralf Haber, Heinz Weis and Karsten Kobs.

== International competitions ==
Year	Competition	Venue	Position	Notes
Representing East Germany
1983	World Championships	Helsinki, Finland	5th	77.08 m
1985	World Cup	Canberra, Australia	2nd	78.44 m
1986	European Championships	Stuttgart, West Germany	4th	79.84 m
1986	Goodwill Games	Moscow, Soviet Union	8th	74.50 m
1987	World Championships	Rome, Italy	9th	76.18 m
1988	Olympic Games	Seoul, South Korea	12th	72.36 m
1990	European Championships	Split, Yugoslavia	4th	77.90 m
