= Yuriy Sedykh =

Soviet athlete (1955–2021)

Personal information
- Native name: Russian: Ю́рий Гео́ргиевич Седы́х; Ukrainian: Юрій Георгійович Сєдих
- Full name: Yuriy Georgiyevich Sedykh
- Nationality: Soviet Union
- Born: 11 June 1955 Novocherkassk, Rostov Oblast, Russian SFSR, Soviet Union
- Died: 14 September 2021 (aged 66) Pontoise, France
- Years active: 1976–1995
- Height: 1.85 m (6 ft 1 in)
- Weight: 110 kg (243 lb)
- Spouses: 1. Lyudmila Kondratyeva.; 2. Natalya Lisovskaya

Sport
- Country: Soviet Union (1976–1991)
- Sport: Athletics
- Event: Hammer throw
- Club: Burevestnik Kiev; Avangard Kiev; CSKA Moscow
- Turned pro: 1976
- Retired: 1995

Achievements and titles
- Personal bests: 86.74 m (1986) WR
Medal record
Men's athletics
Representing the Soviet Union
Olympic Games
Gold medal – first place	1976 Montreal	Hammer
Gold medal – first place	1980 Moscow	Hammer
Silver medal – second place	1988 Seoul	Hammer
World Championships
Gold medal – first place	1991 Tokyo	Hammer
Silver medal – second place	1983 Helsinki	Hammer
European Championships
Gold medal – first place	1978 Prague	Hammer
Gold medal – first place	1982 Athens	Hammer
Gold medal – first place	1986 Stuttgart	Hammer
Summer Universiade
Silver medal – second place	1977 Sofia	Hammer
Bronze medal – third place	1975 Rome	Hammer
Bronze medal – third place	1979 Mexico City	Hammer

Yuriy Georgiyevich Sedykh (Russian: Ю́рий Гео́ргиевич Седы́х, Ukrainian: Юрій Георгійович Сєдих; 11 June 1955 – 14 September 2021) was a track and field athlete who represented the Soviet Union from 1976 to 1991 in the hammer throw. He was a European, World and Olympic Champion, and holds the world record with a throw of 86.74 m in 1986.

== Career ==
Sedykh was born in Novocherkassk, Russia, and grew up in Nikopol, Ukraine. He took up track and field in 1967 under coach Vladimir Ivanovich Volovik. He trained at Burevestnik and later at the Armed Forces sports society in Kyiv, attaining the rank of major in the Soviet Army. From 1972 he was coached by Anatoliy Bondarchuk, who is widely regarded as one of the best hammer coaches in the world. In 1973 he became a member of the USSR National Junior Team.

=== Competition ===
Sedykh won gold medals at the 1976 Summer Olympics and 1980 Summer Olympics as well as taking first at the 1986 Goodwill Games. He set a world record of 86.74 m at the 1986 European championships in Stuttgart, where he won his third title in a row. He also came first at the 1991 World Championships. Only Sedykh and Sergey Litvinov have thrown over 86 meters in the history of the sport (Ivan Tsikhan's 86.73 m throw in 2005 was annulled by the IAAF in April 2014 due to doping sanctions).

Sedykh's 1986 world record has been noted for its longevity, and for dating from "a time when track and field was starting to realize the scale of performance-enhancing drug use" (AP). In his 2020 book The Rodchenkov Affair, Russian doping whistleblower Grigory Rodchenkov stated that Sedykh was a heavy user of steroids; Sedykh denied allegations of doping.

=== Coaching ===
Sedykh coached French hammer throwers, including Nicolas Figère (80.88 m).

== Technique ==
Unlike many throwers, Sedykh employed three rotations rather than four. He often practised with lighter and heavier hammers. His technique was based on 'pushing' the ball left and letting the hammer turn him.

== Personal life ==
Previously married to Soviet 100 m Olympic champion Lyudmila Kondratyeva, Sedykh subsequently married former Soviet shot-putter and world-record holder Natalya Lisovskaya who won gold in the 1988 Olympics. They had one daughter, Alexia, born in 1993, who came second in the girls' hammer throw at the 2010 Summer Youth Olympics in Singapore (59.08 m). Sedykh and his family moved to Paris, France, where he taught strength and conditioning at higher education level. Sedykh died in France on 14 September 2021 at the age of 66. The urn with the ashes was buried in the Federal Military Memorial Cemetery's "Pantheon of Defenders of the Fatherland" in Mytishchi, Russia.

Records
Preceded by Karl-Hans Riehm; Jüri Tamm; Sergey Litvinov; Sergey Litvinov	Men's Hammer World Record Holder; 16 May 1980; 16 May 1980 – 24 May 1980; 31 July 1980 – 4 June 1982; 3 July 1984 –	Succeeded by Jüri Tamm; Sergey Litvinov; Sergey Litvinov; Incumbent
Awards
Preceded by Saïd Aouita	Men's Track & Field Athlete of the Year; 1986	Succeeded by Ben Johnson
