= Sergey Litvinov (athlete, born 1958) =

Russian hammer thrower and coach

- Litvinov in 1980

Personal information
- Native name: Сергей Николаевич Литвинов
- Full name: Sergey Nikolaevich Litvinov
- Nationality: Russian
- Born: 23 January 1958 Tsukerova Balka, Krasnodar Krai, Russian SFSR, Soviet Union
- Died: 19 February 2018 (aged 60) Sochi, Krasnodar Krai, Russia
- Height: 1.80 m (5 ft 11 in)
- Weight: 106 kg (234 lb)

Sport
- Country: Soviet Union (1980–1991); Russia (1992–1993)
- Sport: Track and field
- Event: Hammer throw
- Club: SKA Rostov

Achievements and titles
- Personal best: 86.04 m (1986)
Medal record
Men's athletics
Representing the Soviet Union
Olympic Games
Gold medal – first place	1988 Seoul	Hammer
Silver medal – second place	1980 Moscow	Hammer
World Championships
Gold medal – first place	1983 Helsinki	Hammer
Gold medal – first place	1987 Rome	Hammer
European Championships
Silver medal – second place	1986 Stuttgart	Hammer
Bronze medal – third place	1982 Athens	Hammer

Sergey Nikolaevich Litvinov (Russian: Серге́й Никола́евич Литви́нов; 23 January 1958 – 19 February 2018) was a Russian hammer thrower and athletics coach. He competed at the 1980 Summer Olympics and the 1988 Summer Olympics, missing the 1984 Summer Olympics due to the Soviet boycott, and won a silver and a gold medal, respectively. He also won two world titles, in 1983 and 1987. After retiring from competitions he coached elite hammer throwers including Ivan Tsikhan and his son Sergey.

== Career ==
Throughout his career Litvinov battled with Yuriy Sedykh. Litvinov set three world records, the last being 84.14 metres in June 1983. However, Sedykh improved the world record to 86.34 m in 1984 and to 86.74 m at the 1986 European championships. In 1986 Litvinov threw 86.04 metres which remained his personal best. This result puts him second on the all-time performer's list, behind Sedykh. He also coached Ivan Tsikhan.

Litvinov finished second behind Sedykh and ahead of Jüri Tamm in the 1980 Summer Olympics. After missing the 1984 Games because of the Soviet boycott, he won the gold in 1988 ahead of Sedykh; his throw of 84.80 m remains the Olympic record.

Litvinov's son Sergey is also an elite hammer thrower.

== Death ==
Litvinov was reported to have died on 19 February 2018 in Sochi at the age of 60. It was reported by Russia's athletics federation that he suddenly fell from his bicycle as he cycled home from a coaching session, and an ambulance crew was unable to revive him.

== International competitions ==
Year	Competition	Venue	Position	Notes
Representing Soviet Union
1980	Olympic Games	Moscow, USSR	2nd	80.64 m
1982	European Championships	Athens, Greece	3rd	78.66 m
1983	World Championships	Helsinki, Finland	1st	82.68 m
1984	Friendship Games	Moscow, Soviet Union	3rd	81.30 m
1986	Goodwill Games	Moscow, Soviet Union	2nd	84.64 m
1986	European Championships	Stuttgart, West Germany	2nd	85.74 m
1987	World Championships	Rome, Italy	1st	83.06 m = CR
1988	Olympic Games	Seoul, South Korea	1st	84.80 m = OR
Representing Russia
1993	World Championships	Stuttgart, Germany	7th	78.56 m

Records
Preceded by Yuriy Sedykh	Men's hammer throw world record holder 24 May 1980 – 31 July 1980	Succeeded by Yuriy Sedykh
Preceded by Yuriy Sedykh	Men's hammer throw world record holder 4 June 1982 – 3 July 1984	Succeeded by Yuriy Sedykh
