= Kjell Bystedt =

Swedish hammer thrower

Personal information
- Nickname: Bruno
- Nationality: Swedish
- Born: 24 May 1960 (age 65) Arboga, Västmanland, Sweden

Sport
- Sport: Athletics - Hammer throw

Kjell Erik Bystedt (born 24 May 1960) is a retired Swedish hammer thrower who has also competed at the 1988 Summer Olympics.

Bystedt competed for both the BYU Cougars track and field and San Jose State Spartans track and field teams in the National Collegiate Athletic Association.

== See also ==
- Sweden at the 1988 Summer Olympics
