= Ralf Haber =

German hammer thrower

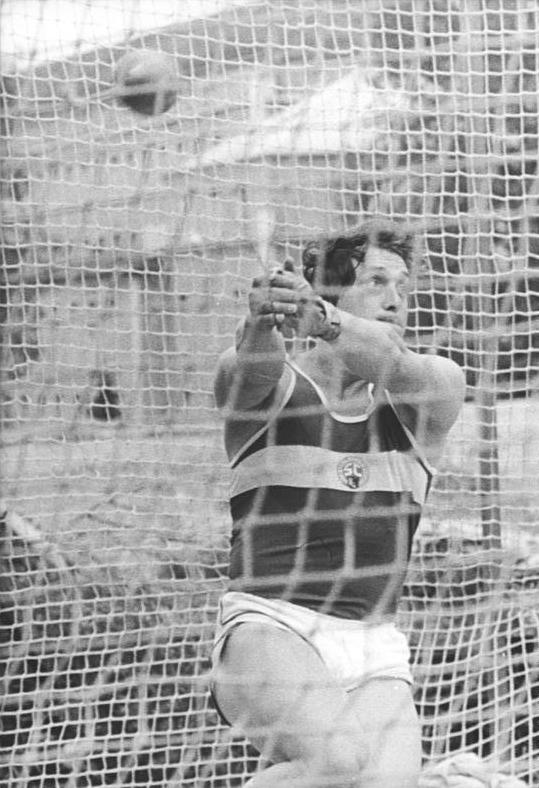
- Ralf Haber in 1984

Personal information
- Nationality: East Germany
- Born: August 18, 1962 (age 63) Altenburg, Thuringia, East Germany
- Height: 1.91 m (6 ft 3 in)
- Weight: 113 kg (249 lb)

Sport
- Country: East Germany
- Sport: Track and Field
- Event: Hammer throw
- Club: SC Karl-Marx-Stadt

Achievements and titles
- Personal best: 83.45 m (1988)
Medal record
Representing East Germany
World Championships
Bronze medal – third place	1987 Rome	Hammer throw

Ralf Haber (born 18 August 1962 in Altenburg, Thuringia) is a retired East German hammer thrower.

His personal best throw was 83.40 metres, achieved in May 1988 in Athens. This is the current German record.

== International competitions ==
Year	Competition	Venue	Position	Notes
Representing East Germany
1981	European Junior Championships	Utrecht, Netherlands	4th	68.08 m
1983	World Championships	Helsinki, Finland	—	NM
1986	Goodwill Games	Moscow, Soviet Union	4th	78.50 m
1986	European Championships	Stuttgart, West Germany	6th	78.74 m
1987	World Championships	Rome, Italy	3rd	80.76 m
1988	Olympic Games	Seoul, South Korea	4th	80.44 m
1989	World Cup	Barcelona, Spain	3rd	76.28 m
