= Hammer throw =

Throwing event in track and field competitions

Athletics Hammer throw
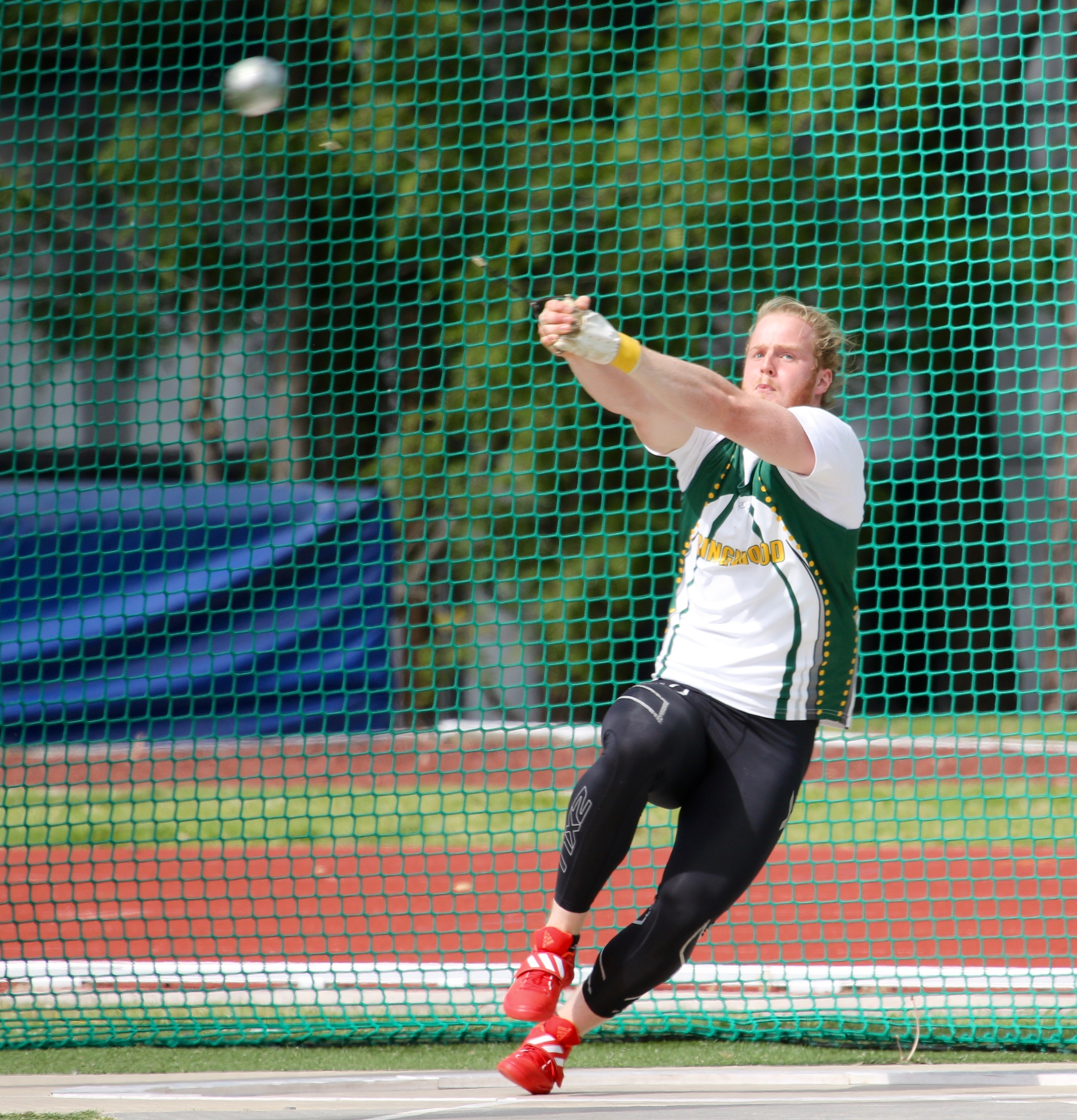
- A hammer thrower in full rotation, spinning the hammer in a circular path

World records
- Men: (Soviet Union) Yuriy Sedykh 86.74 m (284 ft 6 in) (1986)
- Women: (Poland) Anita Włodarczyk 82.98 m (272 ft 2 in) (2016)

Olympic records
- Men: (Soviet Union) Sergey Litvinov 84.80 m (278 ft 2 in) (1988)
- Women: (Poland) Anita Włodarczyk 82.29 m (269 ft 11 in) (2016)

World Championship records
- Men: (Canada) Ethan Katzberg 84.70 m (277 ft 10 in) (2025)
- Women: (Poland) Anita Włodarczyk 80.85 m (265 ft 3 in) (2015)

The hammer throw is one of the four throwing events in regular outdoor track-and-field competitions, along with the discus throw, shot put and javelin.

The hammer used in this sport is not like any of the tools also called by that name. It consists of a metal ball attached by a steel wire to a grip. These three components are each separate and can move independently. Both the size and weight of the ball vary between men's and women's events. The men's hammer weighs 7.26 kilograms (16 lb) for college and professional meets; the women's hammer weighs 4 kilograms (8.8 lb).

== History ==
Tradition traces it to the Tailteann Games in Tara, Ireland, around the year 1830 BC. Some time later the Celtic warrior Culchulainn reputedly took a chariot axle with a wheel still attached, spun it around and hurled it a long way. The wheel was later replaced by a rock with a wooden handle attached. A sledgehammer began to be used for the sport in Scotland and England during the Middle Ages. In current times, the hammer has changed to the more modern 16 lb. ball attached to a wire and a handle, but the Scottish hammer throw as seen in Highland Games still feature the older style of hammer throw with the rock and the solid wood handle.

While the men's hammer throw has been part of the Olympics since 1900, the International Association of Athletics Federations did not start ratifying women's marks until 1995. Women's hammer throw was first included in the Olympics at the 2000 summer games in Sydney, Australia, after having been included in the World Championships a year earlier.

== Competition ==
The men's hammer weighs 7.26 kilograms (16 lb) and the women's weighs 4 kg (8.8 lb), with the wire in either case no more than 122 centimetres (48 in) in length. Like the other throwing events, the competition is decided by who can throw the implement the farthest.

The throwing motion starts with the thrower swinging the hammer back-and-forth about two times to generate momentum. The thrower then makes three, four or (rarely) five full rotations using a complex heel-toe foot movement, spinning the hammer in a circular path and increasing its angular velocity with each rotation. Rather than spinning the hammer horizontally, it is instead spun in a plane that angles up towards the direction in which it will be launched. The thrower releases the hammer as its velocity is upward and toward the target.

Throws are made from a throwing circle. The thrower is not allowed to step outside the throwing circle before the hammer has landed and may only enter and exit from the rear of the throwing circle. The hammer must land within a 34.92º throwing sector that is centered on the throwing circle. The sector angle was chosen because it provides a sector whose bounds are easy to measure and lay out on a field (10 metres out from the center of the ring, 6 metres across). A violation of the rules results in a foul and the throw not being counted.

As of 2025 the men's hammer world record is held by Yuriy Sedykh, who threw 86.74 m (284 ft 6 3/4 in) at the 1986 European Athletics Championships in Stuttgart, West Germany on 30 August. The world record for the women's hammer is held by Anita Włodarczyk, who threw 82.98 m (272 ft 2 3/4 in) during the Kamila Skolimowska Memorial on 28 August 2016. Sedykh's 1986 world record has been noted for its longevity, and for dating from "a time when track and field was starting to realize the scale of performance-enhancing drug use" (AP). According to Russian doping whistleblower Grigory Rodchenkov, Sedykh was a heavy user of steroids, which Sedykh denied.

The throwing distance depends on the velocity and height at which the hammer is released, but also on other factors that are not under the athlete's control. In particular, Earth's rotation affects it via the location's latitude (due to the centrifugal force, the hammer will fly a bit further in a location closer to the equator) and to a lesser extent also via the throw's azimuth (i.e. its compass direction, due to Coriolis forces). According to a 2023 study, such effects are large enough that the top 20 world-record rankings for both men and women at the time could somewhat change if they were adjusted for latitude and azimuth.

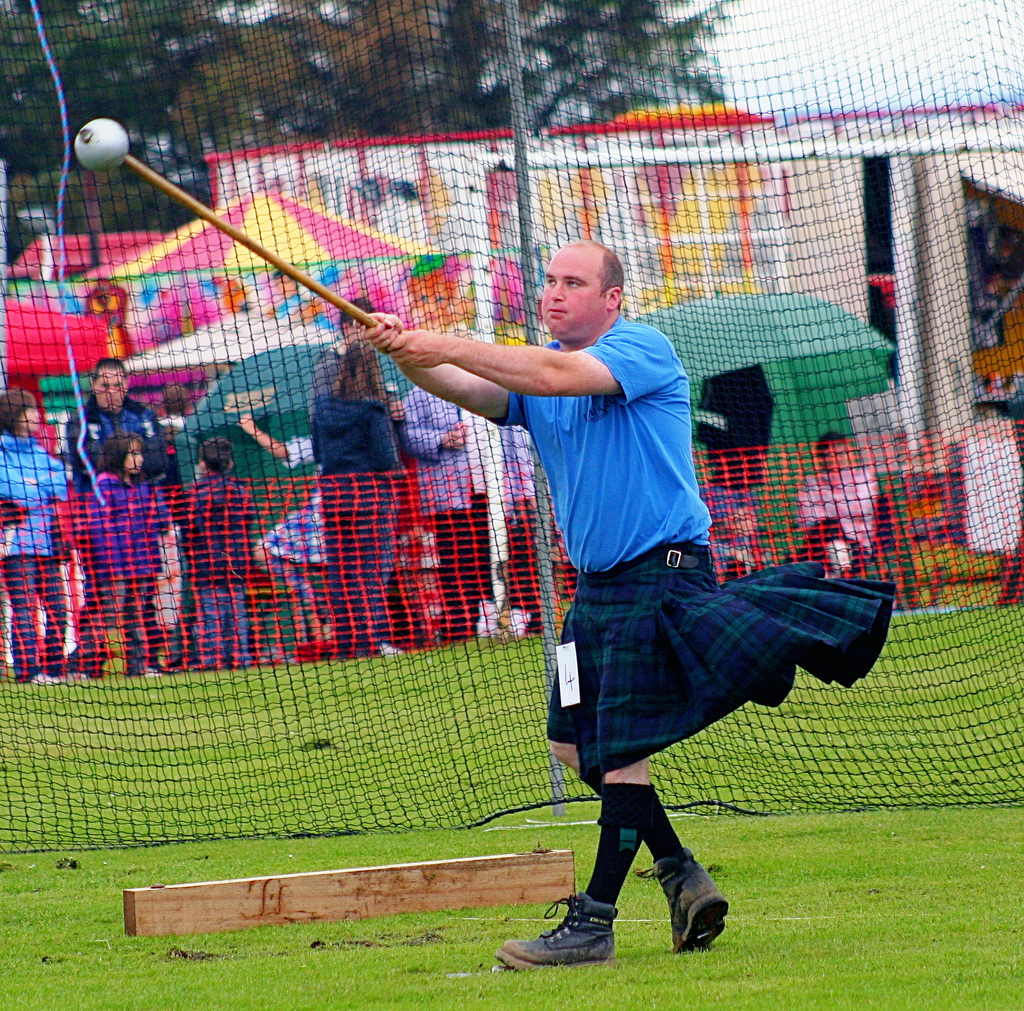
The traditional Highland games version of the event

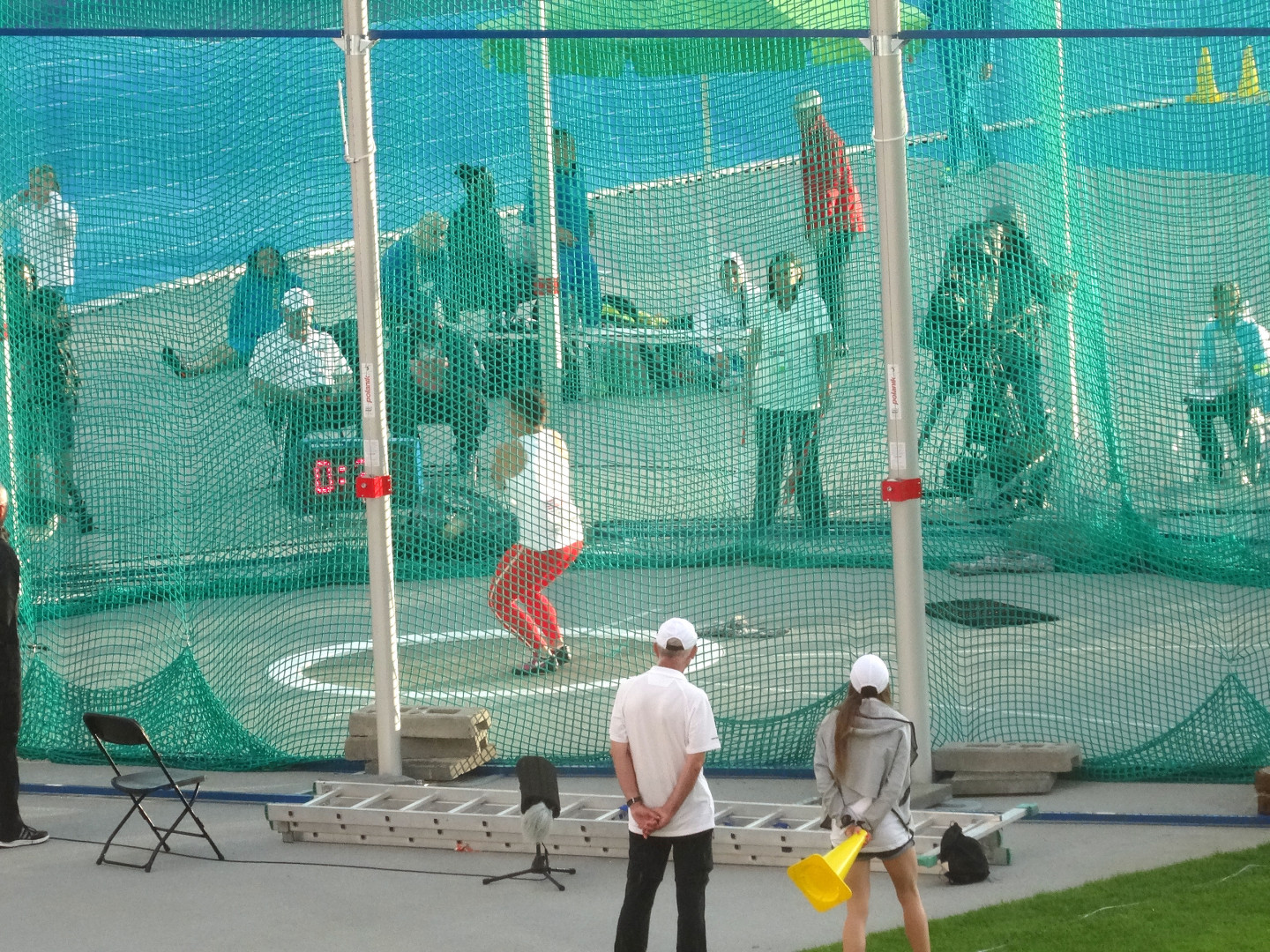
Thrower inside a hammer cage, with the markings for the throwing circle and the throwing sector visible on the ground

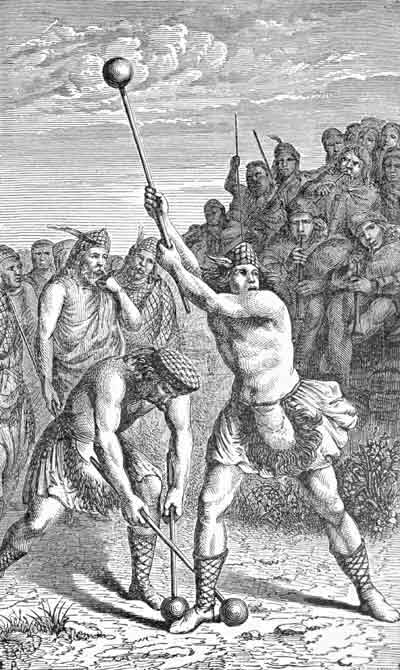
Scottish hammer throw illustration from Frank R. Stockton's book Round-about Rambles in Lands of Fact and Fancy

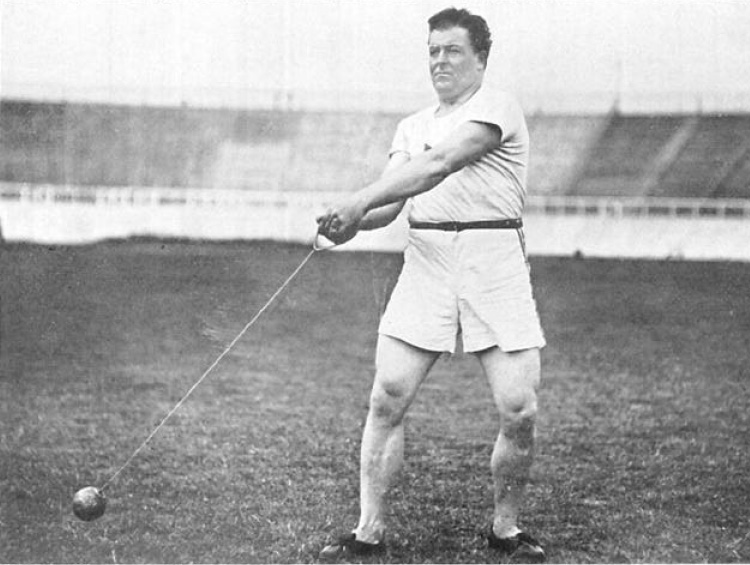
John Flanagan in the hammer throw competition at the Summer Olympics 1908 in London

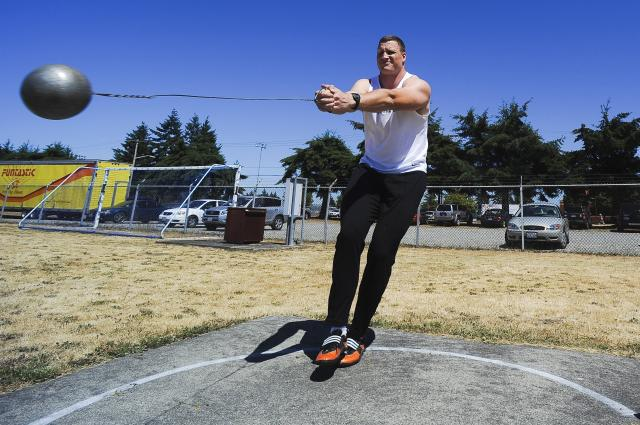
The contemporary version of the hammer throw

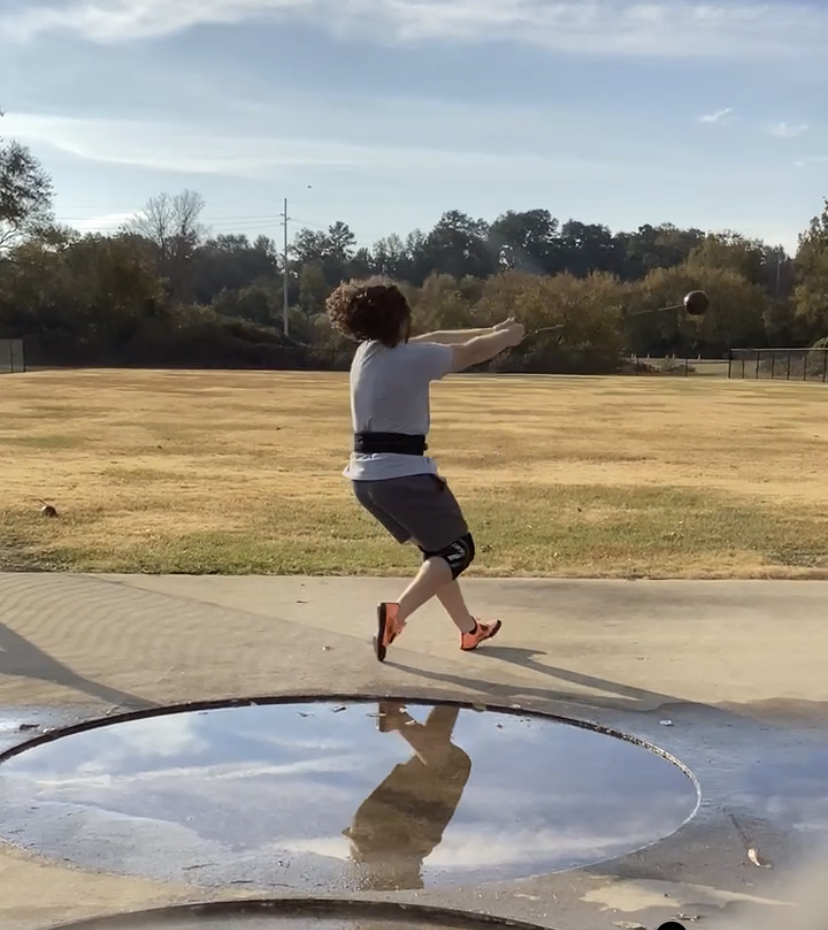
Athlete practicing the hammer throw event

Men's Hammer Throw Final – 28th Summer Universiade

== Implement weights ==
According to World Athletics Technical Rules (Rule 32 / Rule 36), the official implement weight used in competition varies according to gender and age category. Senior and Under-23 (U23) athletes compete with the standard senior implement. For junior age brackets, lighter implements are used: Under-20 (U20) men use a 6 kg hammer, while Under-18 (U18) athletes throw 5 kg (men) and 3 kg (women).

Hammer throw implement weights by category
Age category	Men		Women	
Age category	Weight (kg)	Weight (lb)	Weight (kg)	Weight (lb)
Under-18 (U18)	5.000 kg	11.02 lb	3.000 kg	6.61 lb
Under-20 (U20)	6.000 kg	13.23 lb	4.000 kg	8.82 lb
Under-23 (U23)	7.260 kg	16.00 lb	4.000 kg	8.82 lb
Senior (Open)	7.260 kg	16.00 lb	4.000 kg	8.82 lb

== Safety issues ==
Hammer throwing has been described as involving "inherent danger [...]. Athletes, coaches, and spectators participating in the event are at risk; steel hammers [...] are hurled through the air at great speeds, [travel] far distances, and [are] sometimes difficult to spot in flight." For example, hammer throws resulted in four deaths in Europe in 2000 alone, and have caused deaths and permanent brain damage injuries in the United States too.

To mitigate such risks, a C-shaped "hammer cage" was introduced, which is built around the throwing circle, preventing the hammer from flying off in unwanted directions. In 2004, the IAAF changed its rules to increase the mandatory height of hammer cages to 10m and reduce their "danger zone" angle to around 53°. The change also moved the cage gates further away from the throwing circle, thus reducing the risk of a misdirected hammer bouncing back on the thrower.

== Area records ==
- Updated 20 October 2026.

Area	Men			Women		
Area	Mark	Season	Athlete	Mark	Season	Athlete
World	86.74 m (284 ft 6 in)	1986	Yuriy Sedykh (URS)	82.98 m (272 ft 2 in)	2016	Anita Włodarczyk (POL)
Area records
Africa (records)	81.27 m (266 ft 7 in)	2014	Mostafa El Gamel (EGY)	77.64 m (254 ft 8 in)	2026	Anthonett Nabwe (LBR)
Asia (records)	84.86 m (278 ft 4 in)	2003	Koji Murofushi (JPN)	79.62 m (261 ft 2 in)	2026	Zhang Jiale (CHN)
Europe (records)	86.74 m (284 ft 6 in)	1986	Yuriy Sedykh (URS)	82.98 m (272 ft 2 in)	2016	Anita Włodarczyk (POL)
North, Central America and Caribbean (records)	84.70 m (277 ft 10 in)	2025	Ethan Katzberg (CAN)	81.13 m (266 ft 2 in)	2026	Camryn Rogers (CAN)
Oceania (records)	79.29 m (260 ft 1 in)	2002	Stuart Rendell (AUS)	74.61 m (244 ft 9 in)	2021	Lauren Bruce (NZL)
South America (records)	78.63 m (257 ft 11 in)	2016	Wagner Domingos (BRA)	73.74 m (241 ft 11 in)	2010	Jennifer Dahlgren (ARG)

== All-time top 25 ==
Tables show data for two definitions of "Top 25" - the top 25 hammer throw marks and the top 25 athletes:
- denotes top performance for athletes in the top 25 hammer throw marks
- denotes lesser performances, still in the top 25 hammer throw marks, by repeat athletes
- denotes top performance (only) for other top 25 athletes who fall outside the top 25 hammer throw marks

=== Men ===
- Correct as of August 2026.

Ath.#	Perf.#	Mark	Athlete	Nation	Date	Place	Ref.
1	1	86.74 m (284 ft 6 in)	Yuriy Sedykh	Soviet Union	30 August 1986	Stuttgart	
	2	86.66 m (284 ft 3 in)	Sedykh #2		22 June 1986	Tallinn	
	3	86.34 m (283 ft 3 in)	Sedykh #3		3 July 1984	Cork	
2	4	86.04 m (282 ft 3 in)	Sergey Litvinov	Soviet Union	3 July 1986	Dresden	
	5	85.74 m (281 ft 3 in)	Litvinov #2		30 August 1986	Stuttgart	
	6	85.68 m (281 ft 1 in)	Sedykh #4		11 August 1986	Budapest	
	7	85.60 m (280 ft 10 in)	Sedykh #5		13 July 1984	London	
	7	85.60 m (280 ft 10 in)	Sedykh #6		17 August 1984	Moscow	
	9	85.20 m (279 ft 6 in)	Litvinov #3		3 July 1984	Cork	
	10	85.14 m (279 ft 3 in)	Litvinov #4		11 July 1986	London	
	10	85.14 m (279 ft 3 in)	Sedykh #7		4 September 1988	Moscow	
	12	85.02 m (278 ft 11 in)	Sedykh #8		20 August 1984	Budapest	
	13	84.92 m (278 ft 7 in)	Sedykh #9		3 July 1986	Dresden	
3	14	84.90 m (278 ft 6 in)	Vadim Devyatovskiy	Belarus	21 July 2005	Minsk	
	15	84.88 m (278 ft 5 in)	Litvinov #5		10 September 1986	Rome	
4	16	84.86 m (278 ft 4 in)	Koji Murofushi	Japan	29 June 2003	Prague	
	17	84.80 m (278 ft 2 in)	Litvinov #6		26 September 1988	Seoul	
	18	84.72 m (277 ft 11 in)	Sedykh #10		9 July 1986	Moscow	
5	19	84.70 m (277 ft 10 in)	Ethan Katzberg	Canada	16 September 2025	Tokyo	
	20	84.64 m (277 ft 8 in)	Litvinov #7		9 July 1986	Moscow	
6	21	84.62 m (277 ft 7 in)	Igor Astapkovich	Belarus	6 June 1992	Seville	
	22	84.60 m (277 ft 6 in)	Sedykh #11		14 September 1984	Tokyo	
	23	84.58 m (277 ft 5 in)	Sedykh #12		8 June 1986	Leningrad	
7	24	84.51 m (277 ft 3 in)	Ivan Tsikhan	Belarus	9 July 2008	Grodno	
8	25	84.48 m (277 ft 1 in)	Igor Nikulin	Soviet Union	12 July 1990	Lausanne	
9		84.40 m (276 ft 10 in)	Jüri Tamm	Soviet Union	9 September 1984	Banská Bystrica	
10		84.25 m (276 ft 4 in)	Bence Halász	Hungary	11 August 2026	Birmingham	
11		84.19 m (276 ft 2 in)	Adrián Annus	Hungary	10 August 2003	Szombathely	
12		83.93 m (275 ft 4 in)	Paweł Fajdek	Poland	9 August 2015	Szczecin	
13		83.68 m (274 ft 6 in)	Tibor Gécsek	Hungary	19 September 1998	Zalaegerszeg	
14		83.46 m (273 ft 9 in)	Andrey Abduvaliyev	Soviet Union	26 May 1990	Adler	
15		83.43 m (273 ft 8 in)	Aleksey Zagornyi	Russia	10 February 2002	Adler	
16		83.40 m (273 ft 7 in)	Ralf Haber	East Germany	16 May 1988	Athens	
17		83.38 m (273 ft 6 in)	Szymon Ziółkowski	Poland	5 August 2001	Edmonton	
18		83.30 m (273 ft 3 in)	Olli-Pekka Karjalainen	Finland	14 July 2004	Lahti	
19		83.16 m (272 ft 10 in)	Rudy Winkler	United States	5 July 2025	Eugene	
20		83.04 m (272 ft 5 in)	Heinz Weis	Germany	29 June 1997	Frankfurt	
21		83.00 m (272 ft 3 in)	Balázs Kiss	Hungary	4 June 1998	Saint-Denis	
22		82.78 m (271 ft 7 in)	Karsten Kobs	Germany	26 June 1999	Dortmund	
23		82.77 m (271 ft 6 in)	Merlin Hummel	Germany	16 September 2025	Tokyo	
24		82.69 m (271 ft 3 in)	Krisztián Pars	Hungary	16 August 2014	Zürich	
25		82.64 m (271 ft 1 in)	Günther Rodehau	East Germany	3 August 1985	Dresden	

==== Annulled marks ====
- Ivan Tsikhan of Belarus also threw 86.73 in Brest on 3 July 2005. This performance was annulled due to doping offences.

=== Women ===
- Correct as of September 2026.

Ath.#	Perf.#	Mark	Athlete	Nation	Date	Place	Ref.
1	1	82.98 m (272 ft 2 in)	Anita Włodarczyk	Poland	28 August 2016	Warsaw	
	2	82.87 m (271 ft 10 in)	Włodarczyk #2		29 July 2017	Władysławowo	
	3	82.29 m (269 ft 11 in)	Włodarczyk #3		15 August 2016	Rio de Janeiro	
2	4	81.13 m (266 ft 2 in)	Camryn Rogers	Canada	2 April 2026	Austin	
	5	81.08 m (266 ft 0 in)	Włodarczyk #4		1 August 2015	Władysławowo	
	6	80.85 m (265 ft 3 in)	Włodarczyk #5		27 August 2015	Beijing	
	7	80.79 m (265 ft 0 in)	Włodarczyk #6		23 July 2017	Białystok	
	8	80.51 m (264 ft 1 in)	Rogers #2		15 September 2025	Tokyo	
3	9	80.31 m (263 ft 5 in)	DeAnna Price	United States	26 June 2021	Eugene	
	10	80.26 m (263 ft 3 in)	Włodarczyk #7		12 July 2016	Władysławowo	
4	11	80.17 m (263 ft 0 in)	Brooke Andersen	United States	20 May 2023	Tucson	
	11	80.09 m (262 ft 9 in)	Rogers #3		3 June 2026	Turku	
	12	80.03 m (262 ft 6 in)	Rogers #4		24 April 2026	Nairobi	
	13	79.92 m (262 ft 2 in)	Andersen #2		4 May 2024	Tucson	
	15	79.80 m (261 ft 9 in)	Włodarczyk #8		15 August 2017	Warsaw	
	15	79.80 m (261 ft 9 in)	Andersen #3		20 April 2023	Charlottesville	
	17	79.73 m (261 ft 6 in)	Włodarczyk #9		6 May 2017	Doha	
	18	79.72 m (261 ft 6 in)	Włodarczyk #10		27 June 2017	Ostrava	
	19	79.63 m (261 ft 3 in)	Rogers #5		10 April 2026	Ramona	
5	20	79.62 m (261 ft 2 in)	Zhang Jiale	China	12 September 2026	Huai'an	
	21	79.61 m (261 ft 2 in)	Włodarczyk #11		18 June 2016	Szczecin	
	22	79.59 m (261 ft 1 in)	Włodarczyk #12		22 July 2018	Lublin	
	23	79.58 m (261 ft 1 in)	Włodarczyk #13		31 August 2014	Berlin	
	24	79.48 m (260 ft 9 in)	Włodarczyk #14		21 May 2016	Halle	
	25	79.45 m (260 ft 7 in)	Włodarczyk #15		29 May 2016	Forbach	
6		79.42 m (260 ft 6 in)	Betty Heidler	Germany	21 May 2011	Halle	
7		79.33 m (260 ft 3 in)	Rachel Richeson	United States	6 June 2026	College Station	
8		78.51 m (257 ft 6 in)	Tatyana Lysenko	Russia	5 July 2012	Cheboksary	
9		78.22 m (256 ft 7 in)	Zhao Jie	China	3 April 2026	Chengdu	
10		78.00 m (255 ft 10 in)	Janee' Kassanavoid	United States	21 May 2022	Tucson	
11		77.78 m (255 ft 2 in)	Gwen Berry	United States	8 June 2018	Chorzów	
12		77.68 m (254 ft 10 in)	Wang Zheng	China	29 March 2014	Chengdu	
13		77.67 m (254 ft 9 in)	Anastasiya Maslova	Belarus	7 May 2026	Brest	
14		77.64 m (254 ft 8 in)	Anthonett Nabwe	Liberia	23 April 2026	Des Moines	
15		77.35 m (253 ft 9 in)	Krista Tervo	Finland	28 May 2026	Bergen	
16		77.33 m (253 ft 8 in)	Zhang Wenxiu	China	28 September 2014	Incheon	
17		77.32 m (253 ft 8 in)	Aksana Miankova	Belarus	29 June 2008	Minsk	
18		77.26 m (253 ft 5 in)	Gulfiya Agafonova	Russia	12 June 2006	Tula	
19		77.13 m (253 ft 0 in)	Oksana Kondratyeva	Russia	30 June 2013	Zhukovskiy	
20		77.10 m (252 ft 11 in)	Hanna Skydan	Azerbaijan	23 August 2023	Budapest	
21		77.07 m (252 ft 10 in)	Silja Kosonen	Finland	15 March 2025	Nicosia	
22		76.90 m (252 ft 3 in)	Martina Hrašnová	Slovakia	16 May 2009	Trnava	
23		76.85 m (252 ft 1 in)	Malwina Kopron	Poland	26 August 2017	Taipei City	
24		76.83 m (252 ft 0 in)	Kamila Skolimowska	Poland	11 May 2007	Doha	
25		76.72 m (251 ft 8 in)	Mariya Bespalova	Russia	23 June 2012	Zhukovsky	

==== Annulled marks ====
The following athletes had their performances (over 77.00 m) annulled due to doping offences:

- Tatyana Lysenko (Russia) 78.80 (2013) and 78.15 (2013).
- Aksana Miankova (Belarus) 78.69 and 78.19 (both 2012).
- Gulfiya Agafonova (Russia) 77.36 (2007).

== Olympic medalists ==
=== Men ===
Games	Gold	Silver	Bronze
1900 Paris	John Flanagan; United States	Truxtun Hare; United States	Josiah McCracken; United States
1904 St. Louis	John Flanagan; United States	John DeWitt; United States	Ralph Rose; United States
1908 London	John Flanagan; United States	Matt McGrath; United States	Con Walsh; Canada
1912 Stockholm	Matt McGrath; United States	Duncan Gillis; Canada	Clarence Childs; United States
1920 Antwerp	Patrick Ryan; United States	Carl Johan Lind; Sweden	Basil Bennett; United States
1924 Paris	Fred Tootell; United States	Matt McGrath; United States	Malcolm Nokes; Great Britain
1928 Amsterdam	Pat O'Callaghan; Ireland	Ossian Skiöld; Sweden	Edmund Black; United States
1932 Los Angeles	Pat O'Callaghan; Ireland	Ville Pörhölä; Finland	Peter Zaremba; United States
1936 Berlin	Karl Hein; Germany	Erwin Blask; Germany	Fred Warngård; Sweden
1948 London	Imre Németh; Hungary	Ivan Gubijan; Yugoslavia	Robert Bennett; United States
1952 Helsinki	József Csermák; Hungary	Karl Storch; Germany	Imre Németh; Hungary
1956 Melbourne	Hal Connolly; United States	Mikhail Krivonosov; Soviet Union	Anatoliy Samotsvetov; Soviet Union
1960 Rome	Vasily Rudenkov; Soviet Union	Gyula Zsivótzky; Hungary	Tadeusz Rut; Poland
1964 Tokyo	Romuald Klim; Soviet Union	Gyula Zsivótzky; Hungary	Uwe Beyer; United Team of Germany
1968 Mexico City	Gyula Zsivótzky; Hungary	Romuald Klim; Soviet Union	Lázár Lovász; Hungary
1972 Munich	Anatoliy Bondarchuk; Soviet Union	Jochen Sachse; East Germany	Vasiliy Khmelevskiy; Soviet Union
1976 Montreal	Yuriy Sedykh; Soviet Union	Aleksey Spiridonov; Soviet Union	Anatoliy Bondarchuk; Soviet Union
1980 Moscow	Yuriy Sedykh; Soviet Union	Sergey Litvinov; Soviet Union	Jüri Tamm; Soviet Union
1984 Los Angeles	Juha Tiainen; Finland	Karl-Hans Riehm; West Germany	Klaus Ploghaus; West Germany
1988 Seoul	Sergey Litvinov; Soviet Union	Yuriy Sedykh; Soviet Union	Jüri Tamm; Soviet Union
1992 Barcelona	Andrey Abduvaliyev; Unified Team	Igor Astapkovich; Unified Team	Igor Nikulin; Unified Team
1996 Atlanta	Balázs Kiss; Hungary	Lance Deal; United States	Oleksandr Krykun; Ukraine
2000 Sydney	Szymon Ziółkowski; Poland	Nicola Vizzoni; Italy	Igor Astapkovich; Belarus
2004 Athens	Koji Murofushi; Japan	Not awarded	Not awarded
2008 Beijing	Primož Kozmus; Slovenia	Vadim Devyatovskiy; Belarus	Ivan Tsikhan; Belarus
2012 London	Krisztián Pars; Hungary	Primož Kozmus; Slovenia	Koji Murofushi; Japan
2016 Rio de Janeiro	Dilshod Nazarov; Tajikistan	Ivan Tsikhan; Belarus	Wojciech Nowicki; Poland
2020 Tokyo	Wojciech Nowicki; Poland	Eivind Henriksen; Norway	Paweł Fajdek; Poland
2024 Paris	Ethan Katzberg; Canada	Bence Halász; Hungary	Mykhaylo Kokhan; Ukraine
2028 Los Angeles			

=== Women ===
Games	Gold	Silver	Bronze
2000 Sydney	Kamila Skolimowska; Poland	Olga Kuzenkova; Russia	Kirsten Münchow; Germany
2004 Athens	Olga Kuzenkova; Russia	Yipsi Moreno; Cuba	Yunaika Crawford; Cuba
2008 Beijing	Yipsi Moreno; Cuba	Zhang Wenxiu; China	Manuela Montebrun; France
2012 London	Anita Włodarczyk; Poland	Betty Heidler; Germany	Zhang Wenxiu; China
2016 Rio de Janeiro	Anita Włodarczyk; Poland	Zhang Wenxiu; China	Sophie Hitchon; Great Britain
2020 Tokyo	Anita Włodarczyk; Poland	Wang Zheng; China	Malwina Kopron; Poland
2024 Paris	Camryn Rogers; Canada	Annette Echikunwoke; United States	Zhao Jie; China
2028 Los Angeles			

== World Championships medalists ==
=== Men ===
Championships	Gold	Silver	Bronze
1983 Helsinki	Sergey Litvinov (URS)	Yuriy Sedykh (URS)	Zdzisław Kwaśny (POL)
1987 Rome	Sergey Litvinov (URS)	Jüri Tamm (URS)	Ralf Haber (GDR)
1991 Tokyo	Yuriy Sedykh (URS)	Igor Astapkovich (URS)	Heinz Weis (GER)
1993 Stuttgart	Andrey Abduvaliyev (TJK)	Igor Astapkovich (BLR)	Tibor Gécsek (HUN)
1995 Gothenburg	Andrey Abduvaliyev (TJK)	Igor Astapkovich (BLR)	Tibor Gécsek (HUN)
1997 Athens	Heinz Weis (GER)	Andriy Skvaruk (UKR)	Vasiliy Sidorenko (RUS)
1999 Seville	Karsten Kobs (GER)	Zsolt Németh (HUN)	Vladyslav Piskunov (UKR)
2001 Edmonton	Szymon Ziółkowski (POL)	Koji Murofushi (JPN)	Ilya Konovalov (RUS)
2003 Saint-Denis	Ivan Tsikhan (BLR)	Adrián Annus (HUN)	Koji Murofushi (JPN)
2005 Helsinki	Szymon Ziółkowski (POL)	Markus Esser (GER)	Olli-Pekka Karjalainen (FIN)
2007 Osaka	Ivan Tsikhan (BLR)	Primož Kozmus (SLO)	Libor Charfreitag (SVK)
2009 Berlin	Primož Kozmus (SLO)	Szymon Ziółkowski (POL)	Aleksey Zagornyi (RUS)
2011 Daegu	Koji Murofushi (JPN)	Krisztián Pars (HUN)	Primož Kozmus (SLO)
2013 Moscow	Paweł Fajdek (POL)	Krisztián Pars (HUN)	Lukáš Melich (CZE)
2015 Beijing	Paweł Fajdek (POL)	Dilshod Nazarov (TJK)	Wojciech Nowicki (POL)
2017 London	Paweł Fajdek (POL)	Valeriy Pronkin (ANA)	Wojciech Nowicki (POL)
2019 Doha	Paweł Fajdek (POL)	Quentin Bigot (FRA)	Bence Halász (HUN); Wojciech Nowicki (POL)
2022 Eugene	Paweł Fajdek (POL)	Wojciech Nowicki (POL)	Eivind Henriksen (NOR)
2023 Budapest	Ethan Katzberg (CAN)	Wojciech Nowicki (POL)	Bence Halász (HUN)
2025 Tokyo	Ethan Katzberg (CAN)	Merlin Hummel (GER)	Bence Halász (HUN)

==== Medal table ====
Rank	Nation	Gold	Silver	Bronze	Total
1	Poland (POL)	7	3	4	14
2	Soviet Union (URS)	3	3	0	6
3	Germany (GER)	2	2	1	5
4	Belarus (BLR)	2	2	0	4
5	Tajikistan (TJK)	2	1	0	3
6	Canada (CAN)	2	0	0	2
7	Japan (JPN)	1	1	1	3
7	Slovenia (SLO)	1	1	1	3
9	Hungary (HUN)	0	4	5	9
10	Ukraine (UKR)	0	1	1	2
11	France (FRA)	0	1	0	1
–	Authorised Neutral Athletes (ANA)	0	1	0	1
12	Russia (RUS)	0	0	3	3
13	Czech Republic (CZE)	0	0	1	1
13	East Germany (GDR)	0	0	1	1
13	Finland (FIN)	0	0	1	1
13	Norway (NOR)	0	0	1	1
13	Slovakia (SVK)	0	0	1	1
Totals (17 entries)		20	20	21	61

=== Women ===
Championships	Gold	Silver	Bronze
1999 Seville	Mihaela Melinte (ROU)	Olga Kuzenkova (RUS)	Lisa Misipeka (ASA)
2001 Edmonton	Yipsi Moreno (CUB)	Olga Kuzenkova (RUS)	Bronwyn Eagles (AUS)
2003 Saint-Denis	Yipsi Moreno (CUB)	Olga Kuzenkova (RUS)	Manuela Montebrun (FRA)
2005 Helsinki	Yipsi Moreno (CUB)	Tatyana Lysenko (RUS)	Manuela Montebrun (FRA)
2007 Osaka	Betty Heidler (GER)	Yipsi Moreno (CUB)	Zhang Wenxiu (CHN)
2009 Berlin	Anita Włodarczyk (POL)	Betty Heidler (GER)	Martina Hrašnová (SVK)
2011 Daegu	Tatyana Lysenko (RUS)	Betty Heidler (GER)	Zhang Wenxiu (CHN)
2013 Moscow	Anita Włodarczyk (POL)	Zhang Wenxiu (CHN)	Wang Zheng (CHN)
2015 Beijing	Anita Włodarczyk (POL)	Zhang Wenxiu (CHN)	Alexandra Tavernier (FRA)
2017 London	Anita Włodarczyk (POL)	Wang Zheng (CHN)	Malwina Kopron (POL)
2019 Doha	DeAnna Price (USA)	Joanna Fiodorow (POL)	Wang Zheng (CHN)
2022 Eugene	Brooke Andersen (USA)	Camryn Rogers (CAN)	Janee' Kassanavoid (USA)
2023 Budapest	Camryn Rogers (CAN)	Janee' Kassanavoid (USA)	DeAnna Price (USA)
2025 Tokyo	Camryn Rogers (CAN)	Zhao Jie (PRC)	Zhang Jiale (PRC)

== World leading marks ==
=== Men ===
Year	Mark	Athlete	Place
1971	76.40 m (250 ft 7 in)	Walter Schmidt (FRG)	Lahr
1972	75.88 m (248 ft 11 in)	Anatoliy Bondarchuk (URS)	Kyiv
1973	75.20 m (246 ft 8 in)	Anatoliy Bondarchuk (URS)	Moscow
1974	76.66 m (251 ft 6 in)	Aleksey Spiridonov (URS)	Munich
1975	79.30 m (260 ft 2 in)	Walter Schmidt (FRG)	Frankfurt
1976	78.86 m (258 ft 8 in)	Yuriy Sedykh (URS)	Sochi
1977	77.60 m (254 ft 7 in)	Karl-Hans Riehm (FRG)	Gelsenkirchen
1978	80.32 m (263 ft 6 in)	Karl-Hans Riehm (FRG)	Heidenheim
1979	79.82 m (261 ft 10 in)	Sergey Litvinov (URS)	Leipzig
1980	81.80 m (268 ft 4 in)	Yuriy Sedykh (URS)	Moscow
1981	80.56 m (264 ft 3 in)	Klaus Ploghaus (FRG)	Obersühl
1982	83.98 m (275 ft 6 in)	Sergey Litvinov (URS)	Moscow
1983	84.14 m (276 ft 0 in)	Sergey Litvinov (URS)	Moscow
1984	86.34 m (283 ft 3 in)	Yuriy Sedykh (URS)	Cork
1985	84.08 m (275 ft 10 in)	Jüri Tamm (URS)	Budapest
1986	86.74 m (284 ft 6 in)	Yuriy Sedykh (URS)	Stuttgart
1987	83.48 m (273 ft 10 in)	Sergey Litvinov (URS)	Karl-Marx-Stadt
1988	85.14 m (279 ft 3 in)	Yuriy Sedykh (URS)	Moscow
1989	82.84 m (271 ft 9 in)	Heinz Weis (FRG)	Berlin
1990	84.48 m (277 ft 1 in)	Igor Nikulin (URS)	Lausanne
1991	84.26 m (276 ft 5 in)	Igor Astapkovich (URS)	Reims
1992	84.62 m (277 ft 7 in)	Igor Astapkovich (BLR)	Seville
1993	82.78 m (271 ft 7 in)	Andrey Abduvaliyev (TJK)	Nitra
1994	83.36 m (273 ft 5 in)	Andrey Abduvaliyev (TJK)	Budapest
1995	83.10 m (272 ft 7 in)	Andrey Abduvaliyev (TJK)	Tashkent
1996	82.52 m (270 ft 8 in)	Lance Deal (USA)	Milan
1997	83.04 m (272 ft 5 in)	Heinz Weis (GER)	Frankfurt
1998	83.68 m (274 ft 6 in)	Tibor Gécsek (HUN)	Zalaegerszeg
1999	82.78 m (271 ft 7 in)	Karsten Kobs (GER)	Dortmund
2000	82.58 m (270 ft 11 in)	Igor Astapkovich (BLR)	Staiki
2001	83.47 m (273 ft 10 in)	Koji Murofushi (JPN)	Toyota
2002	83.43 m (273 ft 8 in)	Aleksey Zagornyi (RUS)	Adler
2003	84.86 m (278 ft 4 in)	Koji Murofushi (JPN)	Prague
2004	84.46 m (277 ft 1 in)	Ivan Tsikhan (BLR)	Minsk
2005	84.90 m (278 ft 6 in)	Vadim Devyatovskiy (BLR)	Minsk
2006	82.95 m (272 ft 1 in)	Vadim Devyatovskiy (BLR)	Minsk
2007	83.63 m (274 ft 4 in)	Ivan Tsikhan (BLR)	Osaka
2008	84.51 m (277 ft 3 in)	Ivan Tsikhan (BLR)	Grodno
2009	82.58 m (270 ft 11 in)	Primož Kozmus (SLO)	Celje
2010	80.99 m (265 ft 8 in)	Koji Murofushi (JPN)	Rieti
2011	81.89 m (268 ft 8 in)	Krisztián Pars (HUN)	Szombathely
2012	82.81 m (271 ft 8 in)	Ivan Tsikhan (BLR)	Brest
2013	82.40 m (270 ft 4 in)	Krisztián Pars (HUN)	Dubnica
2014	83.48 m (273 ft 10 in)	Pawel Fajdek (POL)	Warsaw
2015	83.93 m (275 ft 4 in)	Pawel Fajdek (POL)	Szczecin
2016	81.87 m (268 ft 7 in)	Pawel Fajdek (POL)	Bydgoszcz
2017	83.44 m (273 ft 9 in)	Pawel Fajdek (POL)	Ostrava
2018	81.85 m (268 ft 6 in)	Wojciech Nowicki (POL)	Székesfehérvár
2019	81.74 m (268 ft 2 in)	Wojciech Nowicki (POL)	Poznań
2020	80.70 m (264 ft 9 in)	Rudy Winkler (USA)	Wallkill
2021	82.98 m (272 ft 2 in)	Pawel Fajdek (POL)	Chorzów
2022	82.00 m (269 ft 0 in)	Wojciech Nowicki (POL)	Munich
2023	81.92 m (268 ft 9 in)	Wojciech Nowicki (POL)	Oslo
2024	84.38 m (276 ft 10 in)	Ethan Katzberg (CAN)	Nairobi
2025	84.70 m (277 ft 10 in)	Ethan Katzberg (CAN)	Tokyo
2026	84.25 m (276 ft 4 in)	Bence Halász (HUN)	Birmingham

=== Women ===
Year	Mark	Athlete	Place
1988	58.94 m (193 ft 4 in)	Carol Cady (USA)	Los Gatos
1989	61.50 m (201 ft 9 in)	Yelena Pichugina (URS)	Frunze
1990	61.96 m (203 ft 3 in)	Larisa Baranova (URS)	Adler
1991	64.44 m (211 ft 5 in)	Alla Davydova (URS)	Adler
1992	65.40 m (214 ft 6 in)	Olga Kuzenkova (RUS)	Bryansk
1993	64.64 m (212 ft 0 in)	Olga Kuzenkova (RUS)	Krasnodar
1994	67.34 m (220 ft 11 in)	Svetlana Sudak (BLR)	Minsk
1995	68.16 m (223 ft 7 in)	Olga Kuzenkova (RUS)	Moscow
1996	69.46 m (227 ft 10 in)	Olga Kuzenkova (RUS)	Sydney
1997	73.10 m (239 ft 9 in)	Olga Kuzenkova (RUS)	Munich
1998	73.80 m (242 ft 1 in)	Olga Kuzenkova (RUS)	Tolyatti
1999	76.07 m (249 ft 6 in)	Mihaela Melinte (ROM)	Rüdlingen
2000	75.68 m (248 ft 3 in)	Olga Kuzenkova (RUS)	Tula
2001	73.62 m (241 ft 6 in)	Olga Kuzenkova (RUS)	Adler
2002	73.07 m (239 ft 8 in)	Olga Kuzenkova (RUS)	Annecy
2003	75.14 m (246 ft 6 in)	Yipsi Moreno (CUB)	Savona
2004	75.18 m (246 ft 7 in)	Yipsi Moreno (CUB)	Havana
2005	77.06 m (252 ft 9 in)	Tatyana Lysenko (RUS)	Moscow
2006	77.80 m (255 ft 2 in)	Tatyana Lysenko (RUS)	Tallinn
2007	77.30 m (253 ft 7 in)	Tatyana Lysenko (RUS)	Adler
2008	77.32 m (253 ft 8 in)	Aksana Miankova (BLR)	Minsk
2009	77.96 m (255 ft 9 in)	Anita Włodarczyk (POL)	Berlin
2010	78.30 m (256 ft 10 in)	Anita Włodarczyk (POL)	Bydgoszcz
2011	79.42 m (260 ft 6 in)	Betty Heidler (GER)	Halle
2012	78.69 m (258 ft 2 in)	Aksana Miankova (BLR)	Minsk
2013	78.80 m (258 ft 6 in)	Tatyana Lysenko (RUS)	Moscow
2014	79.58 m (261 ft 1 in)	Anita Włodarczyk (POL)	Berlin
2015	81.08 m (266 ft 0 in)	Anita Włodarczyk (POL)	Władysławowo
2016	82.98 m (272 ft 2 in)	Anita Włodarczyk (POL)	Warsaw
2017	82.87 m (271 ft 10 in)	Anita Włodarczyk (POL)	Cetniewo
2018	79.59 m (261 ft 1 in)	Anita Włodarczyk (POL)	Lublin
2019	78.24 m (256 ft 8 in)	DeAnna Price (USA)	Des Moines
2020	75.45 m (247 ft 6 in)	Hanna Malyshik (BLR)	Minsk
2021	80.31 m (263 ft 5 in)	DeAnna Price (USA)	Eugene
2022	79.02 m (259 ft 3 in)	Brooke Andersen (USA)	Tucson
2023	80.17 m (263 ft 0 in)	Brooke Andersen (USA)	Tucson
2024	79.92 m (262 ft 2 in)	Brooke Andersen (USA)	Tucson
2025	80.51 m (264 ft 1 in)	Camryn Rogers (CAN)	Tokyo
2026	81.13 m (266 ft 2 in)	Camryn Rogers (CAN)	Austin

== See also ==
- List of hammer throwers
- Keg-tossing
