= Athletics at the 1952 Summer Olympics – Men's hammer throw =

Men's hammer throw at the Games of the XV Olympiad
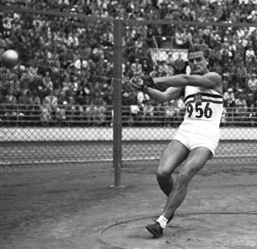
- József Csermák competing
- Venue: Helsinki Olympic Stadium
- Date: July 24, 1952
- Competitors: 33 from 18 nations
- Winning distance: 60.34 WR

Medalists
1st place, gold medalist(s)		József Csermák; Hungary
2nd place, silver medalist(s)		Karl Storch; Germany
3rd place, bronze medalist(s)		Imre Németh; Hungary

Video on YouTube amateur film

The men's hammer throw event at the 1952 Summer Olympics took place on 24 July at the Helsinki Olympic Stadium. There were 33 competitors from 18 nations. The maximum number of athletes per nation had been set at 3 since the 1930 Olympic Congress. The event was won by József Csermák of Hungary, the nation's second consecutive victory in the event. Imre Németh, who had won four years earlier, took bronze; he was the fourth man to win multiple medals in the event. Silver went to Karl Storch of Germany.

== Background ==
This was the 11th appearance of the event, which has been held at every Summer Olympics except 1896. Six of the 13 finalists from the 1948 Games returned: gold medalist Imre Németh of Hungary, silver medalist Ivan Gubijan of Yugoslavia, fourth-place finisher Samuel Felton of the United States, fifth-place finisher Lauri Tamminen of Finland, seventh-place finisher Teseo Taddia of Italy, and eleventh-place finisher Duncan Clark of Great Britain. Németh was among the favorites to repeat; other contenders included 1950 European champion Sverre Strandli of Norway and Karl Storch of Germany.

Belgium, Pakistan, Puerto Rico, Romania, and the Soviet Union each made their debut in the event. The United States appeared for the 11th time, the only nation to have competed at each appearance of the event to that point.

== Competition format ==
The competition used the two-round format introduced in 1936, with the qualifying round completely separate from the divided final. In qualifying, each athlete received three attempts; those recording a mark of at least 49.00 metres advanced to the final. If fewer than 12 athletes achieved that distance, the top 12 would advance. The results of the qualifying round were then ignored. Finalists received three throws each, with the top six competitors receiving an additional three attempts. The best distance among those six throws counted.

== Records ==
Prior to the competition, the existing world and Olympic records were as follows.

World record	Imre Németh (HUN)	59.88	Budapest, Hungary	19 May 1950
Olympic record	Karl Hein (GER)	56.49	Berlin, Germany	3 August 1936

József Csermák set a new Olympic record with a distance of 57.20 metres in the qualifying round. In the final, five men beat the old Olympic record and a sixth man tied it; the three medalists all bettered Csermák's qualifying round mark. Csermák's first throw in the final went 58.45 metres; his third went 60.34 metres for a new world record.

== Schedule ==
All times are Eastern European Summer Time (UTC+3)

Date	Time	Round
Thursday, 24 July 1952	11:30; 16:45	Qualifying; Final

== Results ==
=== Qualifying round ===
Qualification: All throwers reaching 49 metres advanced to the final, with a minimum of 12 advancing.

Rank	Group	Athlete	Nation	1	2	3	Distance	Notes
1	A	József Csermák	Hungary	57.20 OR	—	—	57.20	OR
2	A	Karl Storch	Germany	X	55.35	—	55.35	
3	B	Sverre Strandli	Norway	54.96	—	—	54.96	
4	A	Ivan Gubijan	Yugoslavia	54.76	—	—	54.76	
5	A	Karl Wolf	Germany	53.86	—	—	53.86	
6	B	Teseo Taddia	Italy	53.85	—	—	53.85	
7	A	Miloš Máca	Czechoslovakia	53.72	—	—	53.72	
8	B	Heorhiy Dybenko	Soviet Union	X	53.70	—	53.70	
9	A	Jiří Dadák	Czechoslovakia	53.66	—	—	53.66	
10	A	Imre Németh	Hungary	53.59	—	—	53.59	
11	B	Mykola Redkin	Soviet Union	X	53.58	—	53.58	
12	A	Oiva Halmetoja	Finland	52.55	—	—	52.55	
13	B	Mikhail Krivonosov	Soviet Union	X	51.15	—	51.15	
14	B	Constantin Dumitru	Romania	50.92	—	—	50.92	
15	A	Samuel Felton	United States	50.89	—	—	50.89	
16	B	Poul Cederquist	Denmark	50.77	—	—	50.77	
17	A	Duncan Clark	Great Britain	50.69	—	—	50.69	
18	B	Peter Allday	Great Britain	X	50.59	—	50.59	
19	B	Reino Kuivamäki	Finland	47.96	50.58	—	50.58	
20	A	Marty Engel	United States	X	50.00	—	50.00	
21	B	Rudolf Galin	Yugoslavia	49.98	—	—	49.98	
22	B	Pierre Legrain	France	49.75	—	—	49.75	
23	B	Bob Backus	United States	49.39	—	—	49.39	
24	B	Henri Haest	Belgium	49.08	—	—	49.08	
25	A	Lauri Tamminen	Finland	X	47.74	49.05	49.05	
26	B	Aivo Lucioli	Italy	48.74	X	X	48.74	
27	A	Roger Veeser	Switzerland	47.72	48.60	X	48.60	
28	A	Fazal Hussain	Pakistan	47.80	48.36	45.82	48.36	
29	A	Ewan Douglas	Great Britain	X	X	48.25	48.25	
30	A	André Osterberger	France	X	X	47.87	47.87	
31	A	Muhammad Igbal	Pakistan	X	47.45	X	47.45	
32	A	Arturo Melcher	Chile	X	41.67	45.55	45.55	
—	A	Jaime Annexy	Puerto Rico	X	X	X	NM	
—	A	Aleksandar Bereč	Yugoslavia				DNS	
—	A	Nicolae Gurau	Romania				DNS	
—	A	Svend Aage Frederiksen	Denmark				DNS	
—	B	Bogdan Masłowski	Poland				DNS	
—	B	Charles Reidy	Ireland				DNS	
—	B	Toma Balcı	Turkey				DNS	

=== Final ===
Rank	Athlete	Nation	1	2	3	4	5	6	Distance	Notes
1st place, gold medalist(s)	József Csermák	Hungary	58.45 OR	57.28	60.34 WR	49.68	X	X	60.34	WR
2nd place, silver medalist(s)	Karl Storch	Germany	X	56.45	58.18	58.86	57.80	58.34	58.86	
3rd place, bronze medalist(s)	Imre Németh	Hungary	54.92	55.05	56.82	54.95	57.74	56.30	57.74	
4	Jiří Dadák	Czechoslovakia	54.00	56.81	X	51.72	55.61	54.04	56.81	
5	Mykola Redkin	Soviet Union	53.08	56.55	52.30	53.55	X	54.16	56.55	
6	Karl Wolf	Germany	56.49	54.98	53.79	53.60	X	56.41	56.49	
7	Sverre Strandli	Norway	56.36	53.77	55.07	Did not advance			56.36	
8	Heorhiy Dybenko	Soviet Union	55.03	X	53.68	Did not advance			55.03	
9	Ivan Gubijan	Yugoslavia	53.53	53.82	54.54	Did not advance			54.54	
10	Teseo Taddia	Italy	X	X	54.27	Did not advance			54.27	
11	Samuel Felton	United States	53.10	X	53.32	Did not advance			53.32	
12	Constantin Dumitru	Romania	52.77	X	50.62	Did not advance			52.77	
13	Bob Backus	United States	X	52.11	X	Did not advance			52.11	
14	Reino Kuivamäki	Finland	51.85	X	51.59	Did not advance			51.85	
15	Miloš Máca	Czechoslovakia	51.78	46.89	48.99	Did not advance			51.78	
16	Poul Cederquist	Denmark	X	46.58	51.60	Did not advance			51.60	
17	Rudolf Galin	Yugoslavia	51.37	X	50.21	Did not advance			51.37	
18	Duncan Clark	Great Britain	51.07	X	48.95	Did not advance			51.07	
19	Oiva Halmetoja	Finland	50.75	50.82	X	Did not advance			50.82	
20	Lauri Tamminen	Finland	X	X	50.05	Did not advance			50.05	
21	Peter Allday	Great Britain	44.20	49.70	X	Did not advance			49.70	
22	Henri Haest	Belgium	X	48.78	48.50	Did not advance			48.78	
23	Pierre Legrain	France	44.83	X	46.38	Did not advance			46.38	
—	Marty Engel	United States	X	X	X	Did not advance			NM	
—	Mikhail Krivonosov	Soviet Union	X	X	X	Did not advance			NM	
