= Athletics at the 1948 Summer Olympics – Men's hammer throw =

Men's hammer throw at the Games of the XIV Olympiad
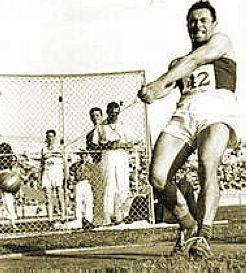
- Silver medalist Ivan Gubijan
- Venue: Wembley Stadium
- Dates: July 31, 1948 (qualifying and final)
- Competitors: 24 from 17 nations
- Winning distance: 56.07

Medalists
1st place, gold medalist(s)		Imre Németh; Hungary
2nd place, silver medalist(s)		Ivan Gubijan; Yugoslavia
3rd place, bronze medalist(s)		Robert Bennett; United States

Video on YouTube Official Video @ 22:55

The men's hammer throw event was part of the track and field athletics programme at the 1948 Summer Olympics. The competition was held on July 31. There were 24 competitors from 17 nations. The maximum number of athletes per nation had been set at 3 since the 1930 Olympic Congress. The final was won by Imre Németh of Hungary. It was the nation's first medal in the men's hammer throw. Ivan Gubijan of Yugoslavia took silver; that nation also earned its first medal in the event. Robert Bennett of the United States received the bronze medal, returning the American team to the podium after a one-Games absence.

== Background ==
This was the 10th appearance of the event, which has been held at every Summer Olympics except 1896. One of the 17 finalists from the pre-war 1936 Games returned: ninth-place finisher Henry Dreyer of the United States. The favorite was Imre Németh of Hungary, who had broken the world record two weeks before the Games. His strongest competition consisted of German throwers, who could not compete because Germany was not invited to the Games as a result of World War II. Bo Ericson of Sweden was expected to be the biggest contender to Németh.

India and South Korea each made their debut in the event. The United States appeared for the 10th time, the only nation to have competed at each appearance of the event to that point.

== Competition format ==
The competition used the two-round format introduced in 1936, with the qualifying round completely separate from the divided final. In qualifying, each athlete received three attempts; those recording a mark of at least 49.00 metres advanced to the final. If fewer than 12 athletes achieved that distance, the top 12 would advance. The results of the qualifying round were then ignored. Finalists received three throws each, with the top six competitors receiving an additional three attempts. The best distance among those six throws counted.

== Records ==
Prior to the competition, the existing world and Olympic records were as follows.

World record	Imre Németh (HUN)	59.02	Tata, Hungary	14 July 1948
Olympic record	Karl Hein (GER)	56.49	Berlin, Germany	3 August 1936

No new world or Olympic records were set during the competition.

== Schedule ==
All times are British Summer Time (UTC+1)

Date	Time	Round
Saturday, 31 July 1948	10:00; 15:30	Qualifying; Final

== Results ==
=== Qualifying ===
Qual. rule: qualification standard 49.00m (Q) or at least best 12 qualified (q).

Rank	Athlete	Nation	1	2	3	Distance	Notes
1	Imre Németh	Hungary	54.02	—	—	54.02	Q
2	Einar Söderqvist	Sweden	52.39	—	—	52.39	Q
3	Bo Ericson	Sweden	52.28	—	—	52.28	Q
4	Svend Aage Frederiksen	Denmark	47.72	51.35	—	51.35	Q
5	Robert Bennett	United States	51.13	—	—	51.13	Q
6	Teseo Taddia	Italy	51.06	—	—	51.06	Q
7	Hans Houtzager	Netherlands	50.91	—	—	50.91	Q
8	Ivan Gubijan	Yugoslavia	50.44	—	—	50.44	Q
9	Henry Dreyer	United States	X	50.37	—	50.37	Q
10	Lauri Tamminen	Finland	49.82	—	—	49.82	Q
11	Duncan Clark	Great Britain	49.76	—	—	49.76	Q
12	Gin Gang-hwan	South Korea	39.03	49.49	—	49.49	Q
13	Samuel Felton	United States	49.20	—	—	49.20	Q
14	Reino Kuivamäki	Finland	47.84	X	48.99	48.99	
15	Poul Cederquist	Denmark	48.16	X	X	48.16	
16	Ewan Douglas	Great Britain	45.91	47.77	X	47.77	
17	Norman Drake	Great Britain	47.60	47.36	47.75	47.75	
18	Pierre Legrain	France	44.03	45.70	47.60	47.60	
19	Dan Coyle	Ireland	47.11	X	X	47.11	
20	Juan Fusé	Argentina	45.77	46.31	46.95	46.95	
21	Edmundo Zúñiga	Chile	44.03	43.93	42.22	44.03	
22	Jaroslav Knotek	Czechoslovakia	40.97	42.46	X	42.46	
23	Nat Singh Somnath	India	X	41.36	X	41.36	
24	Francisco González	Mexico	36.67	39.20	39.50	39.50	
	Aad de Bruyn	Netherlands				DNS	
	Lajos Petike	Hungary				DNS	
	Toma Balci	Turkey				DNS	

=== Final ===
Rank	Athlete	Nation	1	2	3	4	5	6	Distance
1st place, gold medalist(s)	Imre Németh	Hungary	53.59	55.44	54.94	50.05	X	56.07	56.07
2nd place, silver medalist(s)	Ivan Gubijan	Yugoslavia	X	X	54.27	51.76	54.22	X	54.27
3rd place, bronze medalist(s)	Robert Bennett	United States	52.53	51.11	52.08	53.73	51.21	49.81	53.73
4	Samuel Felton	United States	Unknown						53.66
5	Lauri Tamminen	Finland	Unknown						53.08
6	Bo Ericson	Sweden	Unknown						52.98
7	Teseo Taddia	Italy	Unknown			Did not advance			51.74
8	Einar Söderqvist	Sweden	Unknown			Did not advance			51.48
9	Henry Dreyer	United States	Unknown			Did not advance			51.37
10	Svend Aage Frederiksen	Denmark	Unknown			Did not advance			50.07
11	Duncan Clark	Great Britain	Unknown			Did not advance			48.35
12	Hans Houtzager	Netherlands	Unknown			Did not advance			45.69
13	Gin Gang-hwan	South Korea	Unknown			Did not advance			43.93
