= 1954 European Athletics Championships – Men's hammer throw =

Men's hammer throw at the European Athletics Championships

The men's hammer throw at the 1954 European Athletics Championships was held in Bern, Switzerland, at Stadion Neufeld on 28 and 29 August 1954.

== Medalists ==
Gold	Mikhail Krivonosov; Soviet Union
Silver	Sverre Strandli; Norway
Bronze	József Csermák; Hungary

== Results ==
=== Final ===
29 August

Rank	Name	Nationality	Result	Notes
1st place, gold medalist(s)	Mikhail Krivonosov	Soviet Union	63.34	WR
2nd place, silver medalist(s)	Sverre Strandli	Norway	61.07	
3rd place, bronze medalist(s)	József Csermák	Hungary	59.72	
4	Tadeusz Rut	Poland	57.70	NR
5	Miloš Máca	Czechoslovakia	57.05	
6	Imre Németh	Hungary	56.86	
7	Ivan Gubijan	Yugoslavia	56.75	
8	Mykola Redkin	Soviet Union	56.35	
9	Jiří Dadák	Czechoslovakia	55.66	
10	Teseo Taddia	Italy	55.12	
11	Constantin Dumitru	Romania	54.59	
12	Hugo Ziermann	West Germany	54.25	
13	Boris Popov	Bulgaria	54.18	
14	Oiva Halmetoja	Finland	53.66	
15	Ewan Douglas	Great Britain	53.47	
16	Birger Asplund	Sweden	52.72	
17	Guy Husson	France	52.43	
18	Krešimir Račić	Yugoslavia	51.87	
19	Henrik Haest	Belgium	51.26	
20	Poul Cederqvist	Denmark	51.19	
21	Pierre Legrain	France	48.97	
	Karl Storch	West Germany	DNS	

=== Qualification ===
28 August

Rank	Name	Nationality	Result	Notes
1	József Csermák	Hungary	59.33	CR Q
2	Sverre Strandli	Norway	58.52	Q
3	Mikhail Krivonosov	Soviet Union	58.41	Q
4	Ivan Gubijan	Yugoslavia	56.30	Q
5	Mykola Redkin	Soviet Union	56.11	Q
6	Miloš Máca	Czechoslovakia	54.93	Q
7	Boris Popov	Bulgaria	54.49	Q
8	Tadeusz Rut	Poland	54.47	Q
9	Constantin Dumitru	Romania	54.29	Q
10	Teseo Taddia	Italy	53.93	Q
11	Oiva Halmetoja	Finland	53.63	Q
12	Hugo Ziermann	West Germany	53.53	Q
13	Krešimir Račić	Yugoslavia	53.32	Q
14	Guy Husson	France	53.13	Q
15	Birger Asplund	Sweden	52.21	Q
16	Jiří Dadák	Czechoslovakia	52.11	Q
17	Poul Cederqvist	Denmark	51.93	Q
18	Imre Németh	Hungary	51.75	Q
19	Ewan Douglas	Great Britain	51.49	Q
20	Pierre Legrain	France	51.33	Q
21	Karl Storch	West Germany	51.12	Q
22	Henrik Haest	Belgium	51.06	Q
23	Roger Veeser	Switzerland	49.36	
24	Þorður Sigurðsson	Iceland	48.98	
25	Willy Druyts	Belgium	47.44	
26	Josef Hirsch	Switzerland	46.96	
	Nicolae Rascanescu	Romania	NM	

== Participation ==
According to an unofficial count, 27 athletes from 18 countries participated in the event.

- Belgium (2)
- Bulgaria (1)
- Czechoslovakia (2)
- Denmark (1)
- Finland (1)
- France (2)
- Hungary (2)
- Iceland (1)
- Italy (1)
- Norway (1)
- Poland (1)
- Romania (2)
- Soviet Union (2)
- Sweden (1)
- Switzerland (2)
- Great Britain (1)
- West Germany (2)
- Yugoslavia (2)
