= 1946 European Athletics Championships – Men's hammer throw =

Men's hammer throw at the European Athletics Championships

The men's hammer throw at the 1946 European Athletics Championships was held in Oslo, Norway, at Bislett Stadion on 22 August 1946.

== Medalists ==
| Gold | Bo Ericson; Sweden |
| Silver | Eric Johansson; Sweden |
| Bronze | Duncan McDougall Clark; Great Britain |

== Results ==
=== Final ===
22 August

| Rank | Name | Nationality | Result | Notes |
|---|---|---|---|---|
| 1st place, gold medalist(s) | Bo Ericson | Sweden | 56.44 | |
| 2nd place, silver medalist(s) | Eric Johansson | Sweden | 53.54 | |
| 3rd place, bronze medalist(s) | Duncan McDougall Clark | Great Britain | 51.32 | |
| 4 | Imre Németh | Hungary | 50.03 | |
| 5 | Hans Houtzager | Netherlands | 49.86 | |
| 6 | Teseo Taddia | Italy | 48.63 | |
| 7 | Aleksandr Shekhtel | Soviet Union | 46.24 | |
| 8 | Jaroslav Knotek | Czechoslovakia | 46.04 | |

=== Qualification ===
22 August

| Rank | Name | Nationality | Result | Notes |
|---|---|---|---|---|
| 1 | Bo Ericson | Sweden | 53.60 | Q |
| 2 | Eric Johansson | Sweden | 52.29 | Q |
| 3 | Hans Houtzager | Netherlands | 51.46 | Q |
| 4 | Duncan McDougall Clark | Great Britain | 50.81 | Q |
| 5 | Teseo Taddia | Italy | 50.12 | Q |
| 6 | Aleksandr Shekhtel | Soviet Union | 49.90 | Q |
| 7 | Imre Németh | Hungary | 48.47 | Q |
| 8 | Jaroslav Knotek | Czechoslovakia | 48.37 | Q |
| 9 | Reino Kuivamäki | Finland | 47.41 | |
| 10 | Gunnar Christensen | Denmark | 45.94 | |
| 11 | Ivan Gubijan | Yugoslavia | 45.11 | |

== Participation ==
According to an unofficial count, 11 athletes from 10 countries participated in the event.

- Czechoslovakia (1)
- Denmark (1)
- Finland (1)
- Hungary (1)
- Italy (1)
- Netherlands (1)
- Soviet Union (1)
- Sweden (2)
- Great Britain (1)
- Yugoslavia (1)
