= Athletics at the 1954 British Empire and Commonwealth Games – Men's hammer throw =

Men's hammer throw at the Commonwealth Games
- Venue: Empire Stadium
- Dates: 7 August

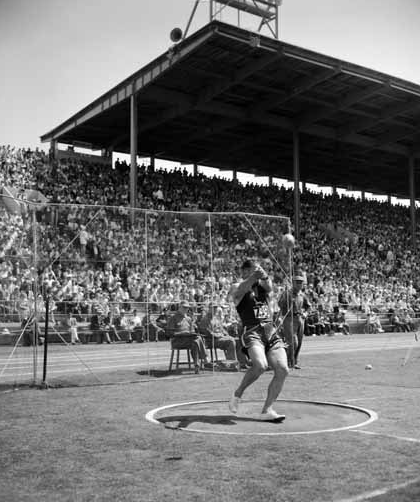
1954 British Empire and Commonwealth Games Hammer throw competition Attribution:Province newspaper

The men's hammer throw event at the 1954 British Empire and Commonwealth Games was held on 7 August at the Empire Stadium in Vancouver, Canada.

== Medalists ==
Gold	Silver	Bronze
Muhammad Iqbal; Pakistan	Jakobus Dreyer; South Africa	Ewan Douglas; Scotland

== Results ==
=== Qualification ===
Rank	Name	Nationality	Result	Notes
1	Muhammad Iqbal	Pakistan	181 ft 1 1/2 in (55.21 m)	q
2	Jakobus Dreyer	South Africa	178 ft 7 1/2 in (54.44 m)	q
3	Peter Allday	England	172 ft 5 in (52.55 m)	q
4	Don Anthony	England	171 ft 9 in (52.35 m)	q
5	Alec Valentine	Scotland	170 ft 11 1/2 in (52.11 m)	q
6	James Lally	Northern Ireland	157 ft 5 1/2 in (47.99 m)	q
7	Ewan Douglas	Scotland	155 ft 4 1/2 in (47.36 m)	q
8	Max Carr	New Zealand	152 ft 7 in (46.51 m)	q
9	John Savidge	England	147 ft 1 1/2 in (44.84 m)	
10	Mark Pharaoh	England	147 ft 0 1/2 in (44.82 m)	
11	Svein Sigfusson	Canada	139 ft 7 1/2 in (42.56 m)	
12	Robert Johnson	Canada	127 ft 5 1/2 in (38.85 m)	
	Stanley Raike	Canada	DNS	
	John Pavelich	Canada	DNS	

=== Final ===
Rank	Name	Nationality	Result	Notes
1st place, gold medalist(s)	Muhammad Iqbal	Pakistan	181 ft 8 in (55.37 m)	GR
2nd place, silver medalist(s)	Jakobus Dreyer	South Africa	179 ft 7 1/2 in (54.75 m)	
3rd place, bronze medalist(s)	Ewan Douglas	Scotland	173 ft 3 in (52.81 m)	
4	Don Anthony	England	171 ft 2 1/2 in (52.18 m)	
5	Peter Allday	England	170 ft 4 in (51.92 m)	
6	Alec Valentine	Scotland	169 ft 0 1/2 in (51.52 m)	
7	Jack Lally	Northern Ireland	157 ft 1 in (47.88 m)	
8	Max Carr	New Zealand	157 ft 0 in (47.85 m)	
