= 1950 European Athletics Championships – Men's hammer throw =

Men's hammer throw at the European Athletics Championships

The men's hammer throw at the 1950 European Athletics Championships was held in Brussels, Belgium, at Heysel Stadium on 26 and 27 August 1950.

== Medalists ==
| Gold | Sverre Strandli; Norway |
| Silver | Teseo Taddia; Italy |
| Bronze | Jiří Dadák; Czechoslovakia |

== Results ==
=== Final ===
27 August

| Rank | Name | Nationality | Result | Notes |
|---|---|---|---|---|
| 1st place, gold medalist(s) | Sverre Strandli | Norway | 55.71 | |
| 2nd place, silver medalist(s) | Teseo Taddia | Italy | 54.73 | |
| 3rd place, bronze medalist(s) | Jiří Dadák | Czechoslovakia | 53.64 | |
| 4 | Ivan Gubijan | Yugoslavia | 53.44 | |
| 5 | Aleksandr Kanaki | Soviet Union | 53.09 | |
| 6 | Duncan McDougall Clark | Great Britain | 52.83 | |
| 7 | Svend-Aage Frederiksen | Denmark | 50.01 | |
| 8 | Ewan Douglas | Great Britain | 49.18 | |
| 9 | Rudolf Galin | Yugoslavia | 49.01 | |

=== Qualification ===
26 August

| Rank | Name | Nationality | Result | Notes |
|---|---|---|---|---|
| 1 | Teseo Taddia | Italy | 55.05 | Q |
| 2 | Sverre Strandli | Norway | 54.17 | Q |
| 3 | Aleksandr Kanaki | Soviet Union | 53.73 | Q |
| 4 | Ivan Gubijan | Yugoslavia | 52.29 | Q |
| 5 | Jiří Dadák | Czechoslovakia | 52.27 | Q |
| 6 | Duncan McDougall Clark | Great Britain | 52.25 | Q |
| 7 | Svend-Aage Frederiksen | Denmark | 50.87 | Q |
| 8 | Rudolf Galin | Yugoslavia | 48.54 | Q |
| 9 | Ewan Douglas | Great Britain | 47.31 | Q |
| 10 | Henri Haest | Belgium | 47.22 | |
| 11 | Toma Balcı | Turkey | 46.63 | |
| 12 | André Osterberger | France | 46.45 | |
| 13 | Pierre Legrain | France | 46.21 | |

== Participation ==
According to an unofficial count, 13 athletes from 10 countries participated in the event.

- Belgium (1)
- Czechoslovakia (1)
- Denmark (1)
- France (2)
- Italy (1)
- Norway (1)
- Soviet Union (1)
- Turkey (1)
- Great Britain (2)
- Yugoslavia (2)
