= Clifford Blair =

Clifford 'Cliff' Blair
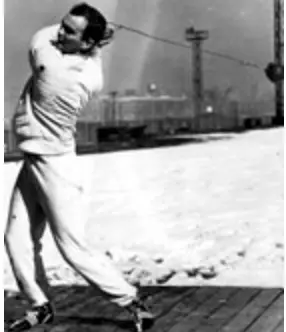

Personal information
- National team: United States
- Born: October 10, 1929
- Died: September 17, 2013 (aged 83)
- Height: 193 cm (6 ft 4 in)
- Weight: 100 kg (220 lb)

Sport
- Sport: Athletics
- Event: Hammer throw
- College team: Boston University Terriers
- Club: New York Athletic Club

Achievements and titles
- Highest world ranking: 10 (1956)
- Personal best: Hammer: 65.95 m (216 ft 4.5 in) (1956, WR (not ratified))

Clifford “Cliff” Blair (October 10, 1929 - September 17, 2013) was an American hammer thrower who qualified for the 1956 Olympics and briefly held the world record in the discipline.

== Early life ==
Blair is a native of Hingham, Massachusetts. He attended Hingham High School from 1945 to 1949 where he would participate in acting football, and track. He found the most success in track, specifically the shot put, competing and placing highly at meets on the local, state, regional, and national level. He left high school with a personal best of 55 ft 5.5 in (16.90 m) achieved in 1948.

== Collegiate career ==
from 1950 to 1957 Blair attended Boston University and competed for the men's track team in 1951, 1952, and 1956. While on a tour of the school as a high schooler with Hall of Fame coach Doug Raymond he was introduced to two other throwing events which he would also have great success in, the discus and the hammer. The latter would become his specialty. While at BU he would collect numerous titles and honors including:

=== AAU Junior Championships ===
- 1951, Hammer: 1st place
- 1951, Weight throw: 1st place

=== AAU Championships ===
- 1952, Hammer: 2nd place
- 1953, Hammer: 5th place

=== 1952 U.S Olympic Trials ===
- Hammer: 9th place

=== New England Championships ===
- 1952, Hammer: 1st place
- 1956, Hammer: 1st place

=== 1956 NCAA Championships ===
- Hammer: 4th place

=== All American honors ===
- 1956, Hammer

At time of his graduation, Blair also held the collegiate and American records in the hammer throw, becoming the first collegian to ever throw over 200 ft (60.96 m) which he did with a 201 ft 8.5 (61.48 m) toss in a duel meet against Penn State on May 12, 1956. His collegiate best came just four days later, a throw of 211 ft 3 in (64.40) in an AAU meet at Boston University Field, which is today known as Nickerson Field.

While Blair accumulated an impressive list of achievements in college, the hammer throw was only contested at the NCAA meet in Blair's final year of competition, giving him only one chance to compete for a collegiate national title.

Blair also did not compete for the Terriers from 1953 to 1955 as he was stationed at Fort Devens Army Installation. In this time he competed in meets with the Fort Devens team against other surrounding bases.

== Olympics, world record, & later career ==
In the summer after his final season at Boston University, Blair earned a spot at the 1956 U.S. Olympic trials to compete in the hammer throw. He finished third, behind Al Hall and Hal Connolly, earning a spot on the Olympic team. Interestingly, all three athletes hailed from the Greater Boston area.

A week after his qualification for the Melbourne Olympics, Blair competed in the AAU New England meet at Needham High School where he recorded a record breaking toss of 216' 4 3/4 (65.96 m) which took four hours to measure because a measuring tape of the correct length was not present at the meet. Prior to the arrival of the required 300 ft measuring tape, three 100 ft tapes were being used, which did not comply with IAAF standards. When the correct measuring tape did arrive from nearby Harvard Stadium, it was 10:45pm and car headlights were being used to light up the area. To add to the confusion, there was a high school band concert happening nearby. This mark bested Blair's own American record and broke Mikhail Krivonosov's world record. However, even after all the effort to measure the distance, this mark was never submitted to the IAAF for ratification and therefore it was not officially recognized. Four days later, Krivonosov of the Soviet Union would reclaim the world record. In November 1956, Hal Connelly would take ownership of the American record.

=== Olympic Team Dismissal ===
One day before the hammer competition in Melbourne, Blair was controversially removed from the U.S. Olympic Team, the reason cited as "violation of the amateur code". The Boston Globe wanted to publish articles from the perspective of the athletes before the upcoming games, and Blair was one of the athletes writing the articles. These "articles" were letters that Blair was sending to Globe editor Jerry Nason, for which Nason said Blair received no pay. Nason also said that the Globe had received permission from the AAU to publish these articles, even receiving a letter from Metropolitan AAU official Pincus Sober confirming permission. Contradicting the claims of Nason, U.S Olympic Committee executive board member Nelson Metcalf said Blair was repeatedly warned not to write for the Globe, as he would be violating the amateur code. Blair claimed that the head coach for the men's Olympic team, Jim Kelly, facilitated his removal from the team not because of the articles, but due to personality clashes. Kelly stated that he was in fact responsible for removing Blair from the team, but claimed Blair was removed for being uncooperative and prioritizing his writing over the games. In response to this disappointing result, Blair was quoted as saying, “Earning that spot on our Olympic team was the greatest thrill of my athletic career. I would loved to have participated. I guess I just wasn't enough of a politician."

Blair continued throwing after his Olympic suspension, placing sixth at the AAU National Meet in 1957, and competing at masters meets into his 60's.

=== Legacy ===
Blair was the first in a line of successful hammer throwers from Boston University that includes John Lawlor, Declan Hegarty, and Conor McCullagh. He was inducted into the Boston University Athletics Hall of Fame in 1976, as well as the Massachusetts State Track Coaches Association (MSTCA) Hall of Fame in 2011.

== Later life ==
Blair enjoyed fishing and later moved to Auburndale, Florida with his wife. He passed away in 2013 at age 83 from Parkinson's Disease.
