= Athletics at the 1958 British Empire and Commonwealth Games – Men's hammer throw =

Men's hammer throw at the Commonwealth Games

The men's hammer throw event at the 1958 British Empire and Commonwealth Games was held on 26 July at the Cardiff Arms Park in Cardiff, Wales.

== Results ==
Rank	Name	Nationality	#1	#2	#3	#4	#5	#6	Result	Notes
1st place, gold medalist(s)	Mike Ellis	England	54.25	58.03	61.11	x	62.90	59.21	206 ft 4 1/2 in (62.90 m)	
2nd place, silver medalist(s)	Muhammad Iqbal	Pakistan	60.38	61.02	61.70	60.05	x	60.71	202 ft 5 in (61.70 m)	
3rd place, bronze medalist(s)	Peter Allday	England							188 ft 11 in (57.58 m)	
4	Howard Payne	Southern Rhodesia							185 ft 0 in (56.39 m)	
5	Don Anthony	England							180 ft 6 in (55.02 m)	
6	Charley Morris	Australia							180 ft 5 in (54.99 m)	
7	Charlie Koen	South Africa							172 ft 2 in (52.48 m)	
8	Malik Noor	Pakistan							167 ft 1 in (50.93 m)	
9	Ewan Douglas	Scotland							164 ft 9 in (50.22 m)	
10	Laurie Hall	Wales							159 ft 10 1/2 in (48.73 m)	
11	Bob Scott	Scotland							149 ft 10 in (45.67 m)	
	Alec Valentine	Scotland							NM	
	Balkar Singh	India							DNS	
