= Dadak =

Dadak is a surname. Notable people with the surname include:

- Jiří Dadák (1926–2014), Czechoslovak athlete
- Pierre Dadak (born 1976), Franco-Polish arms dealer and criminal
