= Kanakis =

Kanakis is a surname. Notable people with the surname include:

- Anna Kanakis (1962–2023), Italian actress and model
- Antonis Kanakis (born 1969), Greek television host and actor
- Giannis Kanakis (1927–2016), Greek footballer

== See also ==
- Kanaki
