= Men's hammer throw world record progression =

World records in the men's hammer throw have been ratified since 1912 by World Athletics, the international governing body for the sport of athletics. As of 29 April 2026, 45 world records have been ratified in the men's hammer.

The current record belongs to Yuriy Sedykh, set at the 14th European Championship in Stuttgart, Germany on 30 August 1986. It is the longest standing ratified world record by men in athletics.

The first ratified record was by Patrick Ryan, set at the Eccentric Fireman’s Annual Handicap Games in New York, United States on 17 August 1913.

== History ==
The current Hammer follows the rules of a 16 English pounds = 7.257 kg hammer and a circle with the diameter of 7 ft (2.135 m)

The 7 ft circle was first introduced in England on 20 April 1874, but during the 1800s in Great Britain and Ireland many times a 9 ft (2.73 m) circle was used in competitions, with some competitions using an unlimited run and follow, so listed marks from those times can be under very different circumstances.

The first listed mark by World Athletics was by Adam Wilson in Hunter's Tryst, Scotland at the Scottish Border Games on 10 May 1828 with a throw of 27.74 m (91 ft) using a 16 lbs wooden-handled hammer.

=== World Athletics (IAAF) Era Ratified Records ===
Table key:
Ratified by World Athletics as World Records
Listed by World Athletics but not ratified

Distance	Name	Nationality	Place	Event	Date	Notes
57.77 m (189 ft 6 in)	Patrick Ryan	Great Britain & Ireland or Ireland	New York, United States	Eccentric Fireman’s Annual Handicap Games	August 17, 1913	While Patrick won his Olympic Medals with the USA, he only emigrated from Ireland in 1910 and wasn't an American citizen till 1916
59.56 m (195 ft 4 in)	Pat O'Callaghan	Ireland	Fermoy, Ireland	Cork Country Championship	August 22, 1937	The Irish Federation (NCAA) at the time was not an IAAF member so could not be accepted as a WR, along with a smaller circle, heavy hammer and the measurement method used.
58.13 m (190 ft 8 in)	Erwin Blask	Germany	Berlin, Germany		August 07, 1938	Threw 58.13 twice, The throwing circle was only superimposed on the surface and countersunk, so the result wasn't accepted as a World Record.
58.24 m (191 ft 0 in)	Karl Hein	Germany	Osnabrück, Germany	International	August 21, 1938	
59.00 m (193 ft 6 in)	Erwin Blask	Germany	Stockholm, Sweden	International Competition, SWE - GER	August 27, 1938	
59.02 m (193 ft 7 in)	Imre Németh	Hungary	Tata, Hungary	National Pre-Olympic Test Meeting	July 14, 1948	
59.57 m (195 ft 5 in)	Imre Németh	Hungary	Katowice, Poland	International Match, POL - HUN	September 4, 1949	
59.88 m (196 ft 5 in)	Imre Németh	Hungary	Budapest, Hungary	National	May 19, 1950	
60.34 m (197 ft 11 in)	József Csermák	Hungary	Helsinki, Finland	Olympic Games	July 24, 1952	
61.25 m (200 ft 11 in)	Sverre Strandli	Norway	Oslo, Norway	International Match, NOR - FIN	September 14, 1952	
62.36 m (204 ft 7 in)	Sverre Strandli	Norway	Oslo, Norway	International	September 5, 1953	
63.34 m (207 ft 9 in)	Mikhail Krivonosov	Soviet Union	Bern, Switzerland	European Championship	August 29, 1954	
64.05 m (210 ft 1 in)	Stanislav Nenashev	Soviet Union	Baku, Soviet Union	Local Sports Meeting	December 12, 1954	
64.33 m (211 ft 0 in)	Mikhail Krivonosov	Soviet Union	Warsaw, Poland	World Youth Games	August 4, 1955	
64.52 m (211 ft 8 in)	Mikhail Krivonosov	Soviet Union	Belgrade, SFR Yugoslavia	International	September 19, 1955	
65.85 m (216 ft 0 in)	Mikhail Krivonosov	Soviet Union	Nalchik, Soviet Union	Soviet Springtime Championship	April 25, 1956	
65.95 m (216 ft 4 in)	Cliff Blair	United States	Needham, United States	New England AAU Track and Field Meet	July 04, 1956	Never submitted at the IAAF Congress
66.38 m (217 ft 9 in)	Mikhail Krivonosov	Soviet Union	Minsk, Soviet Union	National	July 8, 1956	
66.71 m (218 ft 10 in)	Hal Connolly	United States	Boston, United States	All Comers Meet	October 03, 1956	Approved as an AAU record, never submitted at the IAAF Congress
66.85 m (219 ft 3 in)	Mikhail Krivonosov	Soviet Union	Tashkent, Soviet Union	Olympic Test	October 22, 1956	Olympic Test qualifying round, not subsequenstly ratified
67.32 m (220 ft 10 in)	Mikhail Krivonosov	Soviet Union	Tashkent, Soviet Union	Olympic Test	October 22, 1956	
68.54 m (224 ft 10 in)	Hal Connolly	United States	Los Angeles, United States	Olympic Test	November 2, 1956	
68.68 m (225 ft 3 in)	Hal Connolly	United States	Bakersfield, United States	AAU Championship	June 20, 1958	
70.33 m (230 ft 8 in)	Hal Connolly	United States	Walnut, United States	Olympic Test	August 12, 1960	
70.67 m (231 ft 10 in)	Hal Connolly	United States	Palo Alto, United States	International Match, USA - URS	July 21, 1962	
71.06 m (233 ft 1 in)	Hal Connolly	United States	Ceres, United States	California Relays	May 29, 1965	
71.26 m (233 ft 9 in)	Hal Connolly	United States	Walnut, United States	South Pacific AAU Championship	June 20, 1965	
73.74 m (241 ft 11 in)	Gyula Zsivótzky	Hungary	Debrecen, Hungary	Hungarian Inter-Club Championship	September 4, 1965	
73.76 m (241 ft 11 in)	Gyula Zsivótzky	Hungary	Budapest, Hungary	University Meeting of the MAFC	September 14, 1968	
74.52 m (244 ft 5 in)	Romuald Klim	Soviet Union	Budapest, Hungary	International (Népszava Cup)	June 15, 1969	
74.68 m (245 ft 0 in)	Anatoliy Bondarchuk	Soviet Union	Piraeus, Greece	European Championship	September 20, 1969	
75.48 m (247 ft 7 in)	Anatoliy Bondarchuk	Soviet Union	Rovno, Soviet Union	Local Sports Meeting	October 12, 1969	
76.40 m (250 ft 7 in)	Walter Schmidt	West Germany	Lahr, West Germany	National Open Jubilee Sports Meeting of TV Lahr	September 4, 1971	
76.60 m (251 ft 3 in)	Reinhard Theimer	East Germany	Erfurt, East Germany	DDR (GDR) - Championship Qualifying Round	July 4, 1974	
76.66 m (251 ft 6 in)	Aleksei Spiridonov	Soviet Union	Munich, West Germany	Hanns-Braun Memorial	September 11, 1974	
76.70 m (251 ft 7 in)	Karl-Hans Riehm	West Germany	Rehlingen, West Germany	International	May 19, 1975	
77.56 m (254 ft 5 in)	Karl-Hans Riehm	West Germany	Rehlingen, West Germany	International	May 19, 1975	
78.50 m (257 ft 6 in)	Karl-Hans Riehm	West Germany	Rehlingen, West Germany	International	May 19, 1975	
79.30 m (260 ft 2 in)	Walter Schmidt	West Germany	Frankfurt, West Germany	Throwers Day	August 14, 1975	
80.14 m (262 ft 11 in)	Boris Zaichuk	Soviet Union	Moscow, Soviet Union	National	July 9, 1978	
80.32 m (263 ft 6 in)	Karl-Hans Riehm	West Germany	Heidenheim, West Germany	Invitational/Under 23 Match	August 6, 1978	
80.38 m (263 ft 8 in)	Yuriy Sedykh	Soviet Union	Leselidse, Soviet Union	National, Spring Games	May 16, 1980	
80.46 m (263 ft 11 in)	Jüri Tamm	Soviet Union	Leselidse, Soviet Union	National, Spring Games	May 16, 1980	
80.64 m (264 ft 6 in)	Yuriy Sedykh	Soviet Union	Leselidse, Soviet Union	National, Spring Games	May 16, 1980	
81.66 m (267 ft 10 in)	Sergey Litvinov	Soviet Union	Sochi, Soviet Union	RSFSR/Ukraine - Leningrad/Moskva	May 24, 1980	
81.80 m (268 ft 4 in)	Yuriy Sedykh	Soviet Union	Moscow, Soviet Union	Olympic Games	July 31, 1980	
83.98 m (275 ft 6 in)	Sergey Litvinov	Soviet Union	Moscow, Soviet Union	Army Championship	June 4, 1982	
84.14 m (276 ft 0 in)	Sergey Litvinov	Soviet Union	Moscow, Soviet Union	VIII Peoples Spartakiade of the USSR	June 21, 1983	
86.34 m (283 ft 3 in)	Yuriy Sedykh	Soviet Union	Cork, Ireland	Cork City Sports International	July 3, 1984	
86.66 m (284 ft 3 in)	Yuriy Sedykh	Soviet Union	Tallinn, Soviet Union	International Match, URS - GDR	June 22, 1986	
86.74 m (284 ft 6 in)	Yuriy Sedykh	Soviet Union	Stuttgart, West Germany	XIV European Championship	August 30, 1986	

=== Pre-IAAF (World Athletics) Best Marks 1828 - 1912 ===
==== Scottish Border Games records, using 16 lb wooden-handled hammer ====
Distance	Name	Nationality	Place	Event	Date	Notes
27.74 m (91 ft 0 in)	Adam Wilson	Great Britain & Ireland	Hunter’s Tryst, Great Britain & Ireland	Scottish Border Games	May 10, 1828	
31.75 m (104 ft 2 in)	Robert Nevins	Great Britain & Ireland	Etal, Great Britain & Ireland	Scottish Border Games	October 12, 1836	
33.00 m (108 ft 3 in)	George Scott	Great Britain & Ireland	Etal, Great Britain & Ireland	Scottish Border Games	October 25, 1839	
33.36 m (109 ft 5 in)	John Stevenson	Great Britain & Ireland	Etal, Great Britain & Ireland	Scottish Border Games	October 05, 1841	

==== Amateur records for unlimited run and follow, using 16 lb wooden-handled hammer ====
Distance	Name	Nationality	Place	Event	Date	Notes
17.84 m (58 ft 6 in)	Charles Adams	Great Britain & Ireland	Cheltenham, Great Britain & Ireland		April 30, 1856	
18.11 m (59 ft 4 in)	Ralph A. Cameron	Great Britain & Ireland	Brighton, Great Britain & Ireland		September 25, 1856	
18.56 m (60 ft 10 in)	John Maxwell	Great Britain & Ireland	Oxford, Great Britain & Ireland		November 14, 1857	
19.61 m (64 ft 4 in)	John Jerman	Great Britain & Ireland	Marston, Devon, Great Britain & Ireland		October X,1858	
24.23 m (79 ft 5 in)	David Morgan	Great Britain & Ireland	Oxford, Great Britain & Ireland		February 16, 1864	
25.35 m (83 ft 2 in)	David Morgan	Great Britain & Ireland	Oxford, Great Britain & Ireland		March 02, 1864	
26.39 m (86 ft 6 in)	David Morgan	Great Britain & Ireland	Oxford, Great Britain & Ireland		March 18, 1865	
27.80 m (91 ft 2 in)	David Morgan	Great Britain & Ireland	Oxford, Great Britain & Ireland		March 02, 1866	
28.29 m (92 ft 9 in)	George Thornton	Great Britain & Ireland	Cambridge, Great Britain & Ireland		March 29, 1867	
30.12 m (98 ft 9 in)	John Eyre	Great Britain & Ireland	London, Great Britain & Ireland		April 12, 1867	
30.33 m (99 ft 6 in)	Thomas Batson	Great Britain & Ireland	London, Great Britain & Ireland		April 03, 1868	
30.33 m (99 ft 6 in)	Henry Leeke	Great Britain & Ireland	London, Great Britain & Ireland		June 19, 1868	
30.91 m (101 ft 4 in)	Francis Waite	Great Britain & Ireland	London, Great Britain & Ireland		March 18, 1869	
31.68 m (103 ft 11 in)	Henry Leeke	Great Britain & Ireland	London, Great Britain & Ireland		March 18, 1869	
32.67 m (107 ft 2 in)	Francis Waite	Great Britain & Ireland	London, Great Britain & Ireland		April 07, 1870	
33.22 m (108 ft 11 in)	William Burgess	Great Britain & Ireland	Oxford, Great Britain & Ireland		December 08, 1870	
33.22 m (108 ft 11 in)	Edward Garnier	Great Britain & Ireland	Oxford, Great Britain & Ireland		February 08, 1872	
34.01 m (111 ft 6 in)	Henry Leeke	Great Britain & Ireland	London, Great Britain & Ireland		March 27, 1872	
34.19 m (112 ft 2 in)	William Burgess	Great Britain & Ireland	Oxford, Great Britain & Ireland		November 02, 1872	
37.29 m (122 ft 4 in)	Stephen Brown	Great Britain & Ireland	Oxford, Great Britain & Ireland		March 17, 1873	
37.34 m (122 ft 6 in)	Stephen Brown	Great Britain & Ireland	London, Great Britain & Ireland		March 31, 1873	
38.64 m (126 ft 9 in)	George Hales	Great Britain & Ireland	London, Great Britain & Ireland		March 27, 1874	
38.71 m (127 ft 0 in)	George Hales	Great Britain & Ireland	London, Great Britain & Ireland		March 19, 1875	
40.51 m (132 ft 10 in)	George Hales	Great Britain & Ireland	Cambridge, Great Britain & Ireland		November 24, 1875	
41.38 m (135 ft 9 in)	George Hales	Great Britain & Ireland	Cambridge, Great Britain & Ireland		February 24, 1876	
42.14 m (138 ft 3 in)	George Hales	Great Britain & Ireland	London, Great Britain & Ireland		April 07, 1876	

==== 3ft 6 inch wooden-handled hammer from lines drawn 7 ft apart, and no follow through ====
Distance	Name	Nationality	Place	Event	Date	Notes
29.33 m (96 ft 2 in)	George Hales	Great Britain & Ireland	London, Great Britain & Ireland	AAC Championships	April 10, 1876	
33.53 m (110 ft 0 in)	George Hales	Great Britain & Ireland	London, Great Britain & Ireland	AAC Championships	March 26, 1877	
33.73 m (110 ft 7 in)	Owen Harte	Great Britain & Ireland or Ireland	Cork, Great Britain & Ireland	Queen’s College, Cork, Sports	April 19, 1884	
34.80 m (114 ft 2 in)	Owen Harte	Great Britain & Ireland or Ireland	Dublin, Great Britain & Ireland	Royal Irish Constabulary Sports	July 29, 1884	

==== From a 2.135m - 7 ft circle (Current Size) ====
Distance	Name	Nationality	Place	Event	Date	Notes
30.12 m (98 ft 9 in)	Edmund Baddeley	Great Britain & Ireland	London, Great Britain & Ireland	AAC Championships	April 15, 1878	
30.12 m (98 ft 9 in)	Maurice Davin	Great Britain & Ireland or Ireland	Birmingham, Great Britain & Ireland	AAA Championships	July 16, 1881	Co-Founder and First President of the GAA
30.85 m (101 ft 2 in)	John Gruer	Great Britain & Ireland	London, Great Britain & Ireland	AAA Championships	June 30, 1883	
33.00 m (108 ft 3 in)	William Barry	Great Britain & Ireland or Ireland	Tralee, Great Britain & Ireland	County Kerry Meeting	June 17, 1885	
35.51 m (116 ft 6 in)	William Barry	Great Britain & Ireland or Ireland	Tralee, Great Britain & Ireland	Irish AAA Championships	June 24, 1885	
35.61 m (116 ft 9 in)	William Barry	Great Britain & Ireland or Ireland	Dublin, Great Britain & Ireland	Irish AAA Championships	July 11, 1885	
36.27 m (118 ft 11 in)	William Barry	Great Britain & Ireland or Ireland	New York, United States		October 01, 1885	Said to have been an exhibition throw, but regarded as the record
36.27 m (118 ft 11 in)	William Barry	Great Britain & Ireland or Ireland	Cork, Great Britain & Ireland		April 17, 1886	
36.40 m (119 ft 5 in)	James Mitchel	Great Britain & Ireland or Ireland	Limerick, Great Britain & Ireland		June 16, 1886	
36.50 m (119 ft 9 in)	James Mitchel	Great Britain & Ireland or Ireland	Limerick, Great Britain & Ireland		June 09, 1887	
37.06 m (121 ft 7 in)	William Barry	Great Britain & Ireland or Ireland	New York, United States		October 01, 1887	
37.35 m (122 ft 6 in)	William Barry	Great Britain & Ireland or Ireland	New York, United States		July 29, 1888	
39.41 m (129 ft 3 in)	William Barry	Great Britain & Ireland or Ireland	New York, United States	Annual Fall Games of the NYAC	August 12, 1888	
38.91 m (127 ft 7 in)	James Mitchel	Great Britain & Ireland or Ireland	New York, United States	Staten Island AC Games	May 18, 1889	
40.46 m (132 ft 8 in)	James Mitchel	Great Britain & Ireland or Ireland	Bayonne, N.J, United States	Metropolitan AAU Championships	June 12, 1889	
40.74 m (133 ft 7 in)	James Mitchel	Great Britain & Ireland or Ireland	Elkton, United States	Cecil County Fair	October 10, 1889	
40.80 m (133 ft 10 in)	James Mitchel	Great Britain & Ireland or Ireland	New York, United States	Games of the NYAC	June 13, 1891	
42.41 m (139 ft 1 in)	James Mitchel	Great Britain & Ireland or Ireland	New York, United States	Metropolitan AAU	September 12, 1891	
42.63 m (139 ft 10 in)	James Mitchel	Great Britain & Ireland or Ireland	Detroit, United States	Fall handicap Games of the Detroit AC	September 29, 1891	
43.06 m (141 ft 3 in)	James Mitchel	Great Britain & Ireland or Ireland	New York, United States	Brooklyn Heights AC Handicap Athletic Games	October 10, 1891	
43.20 m (141 ft 8 in)	James Mitchel	Great Britain & Ireland or Ireland	Philadelphia, United States	Open Spring Games of the Bank Clerks’ AA, Handicap	June 18, 1892	
44.21 m (145 ft 0 in)	James Mitchel	Great Britain & Ireland or Ireland	New York, United States	New York AC Fall Games	October 08, 1892	While a US 1904 Olympic Medalist in the 56lbs Throw, James became a US Citizen in 1893
44.46 m (145 ft 10 in)	John Flanagan	Great Britain & Ireland or Ireland	Clonmel, Great Britain & Ireland		September 09, 1895	
44.80 m (146 ft 11 in)	John Flanagan	Great Britain & Ireland or Ireland	London, Great Britain & Ireland		April 06, 1896	
45.93 m (150 ft 8 in)	John Flanagan	Great Britain & Ireland or Ireland	Bayonne, N.J, United States	New Jersey AC Games	May 30, 1897	
46.81 m (153 ft 6 in)	John Flanagan	Great Britain & Ireland or Ireland	New Orleans, United States		May 15, 1898	
46.83 m (153 ft 7 in)	Josiah McCracken	United States	Bayonne, N.J, United States	New Jersey AC Memorial Day Sports Carnival	May 31, 1898	
47.18 m (154 ft 9 in)	John Flanagan	Great Britain & Ireland or Ireland	New York, United States	NYAC Annual Open Spring Games	June 11, 1898	
48.26 m (158 ft 4 in)	John Flanagan	Great Britain & Ireland or Ireland	New York, United States	NYAC Annual Open Spring Games	June 11, 1898	
48.27 m (158 ft 4 in)	John Flanagan	Great Britain & Ireland or Ireland	Boston, United States		July 23, 1898	
50.01 m (164 ft 0 in)	John Flanagan	Great Britain & Ireland or Ireland	Boston, United States		July 22, 1899	
50.24 m (164 ft 9 in)	John Flanagan	Great Britain & Ireland or Ireland	New York, United States		July 30, 1899	
50.82 m (166 ft 8 in)	John Flanagan	Great Britain & Ireland or Ireland	New York, United States	NYAC Fall Games	September 23, 1899	
51.10 m (167 ft 7 in)	John Flanagan	Great Britain & Ireland or Ireland	New York, United States	NYAC Fall Games	September 23, 1899	
51.21 m (168 ft 0 in)	John Flanagan	Great Britain & Ireland or Ireland	New York, United States	NYAC Fall Handicap Games	September 29, 1900	Won Gold for the USA at the 1900 Olympics while not a US Citizen
51.61 m (169 ft 3 in)	John Flanagan	Great Britain & Ireland or Ireland	New York, United States	NYAC Fall Handicap Games	September 29, 1900	
52.35 m (171 ft 9 in)	John Flanagan	United States	New York, United States	Handicap Games of the Greater New York Irish-American Athletic Association	September 02, 1901	Became a US Citizen.
52.73 m (172 ft 11 in)	John Flanagan	United States	New York, United States	Gaelic Athletic Benefit Games	July 31, 1904	
52.90 m (173 ft 6 in)	Matt McGrath	United States	Montreal, Canada	Canadian AAU Championship	September 21, 1907	
52.98 m (173 ft 9 in)	John Flanagan	United States	Dublin, Great Britain & Ireland		August 03, 1908	Also threw 53.38m at Torrington on June 20, 1908 but this is not recognised as a US record
54.84 m (179 ft 11 in)	John Flanagan	United States	New York, United States	~	June 26, 1909	
54.86 m (179 ft 11 in)	John Flanagan	United States	New York, United States	New York Press Club Athletic Association Carnival Sports	June 26, 1909	
56.18 m (184 ft 3 in)	John Flanagan	United States	New Haven, United States	Games on the Clan-na-Gael	July 24, 1909	
57.10 m (187 ft 4 in)	Matt McGrath	United States	New York, United States	Galways Men’s S&B Association Handicap Games	October 29, 1911	

==== Other Marks ====
Distance	Name	Nationality	Place	Event	Date	Notes
39.62 m (129 ft 11 in)	James Mitchel	Great Britain & Ireland or Ireland	New York, United States	Annual Open Amateur Games of the Manhattan AC	November 6, 1888	Thrown after the main competition was over.
54.38 m (178 ft 4 in)	John Flanagan	United States	Meridian, United States	Annual meeting of the Irish-American federation	May 5, 1901	Possibly fatal Throw, Hammer struck a bystander on the head. The mark is from where the bystander was standing when hit.
54.38 m (178 ft 4 in)	Ralph Rose	United States	Healdsburg		June 6, 1909	Unsanctioned meet
63.40 m (208 ft 0 in)	Fred Tootell	United States	Mercersburg		September 1924	Exhibition at Mercersburg Academy.

== Notes ==
Original editions of the official IAAF now World Athletics Progression of World Record books recorded British Athletes as GBR for Great Britain and Irish athletes IRL for Ireland, in later editions this was changed to combined both as GBI for Great Britain & Ireland to better represent the athletes actual citizenship as Ireland did not gain independence till 1921-22, they also changed certain athletes based on citizenship such as Patrick Ryan whom was originally recorded as USA when he had only gained citizenship in 1916, nearly three years after his record.

Many sources do not give the date of Theimer's world record. It occurred in the qualifying round of the East German Championships at Erfurt (not Leipzig), which ran from the July 3–6, 1974. His record came with his very first throw, his series being (76.60 m 73.62 m 73.28 m), which was on day two of the championships, July 4, 1974. Next day, in the championship itself, he threw 73.62 m (241 ft. 6") for first place.

== See also ==
- Women's hammer throw world record progression
