= Bo Ericson =

Bo Ericson may refer to:

- Bo Ericson (athlete) (1919–1970), Swedish hammer thrower
- Bo Ericson (ice hockey) (born 1958), Swedish ice hockey player
