= Fazal Hussain =

Fazal Hussain may refer to:

- Fazal Hussain (athlete)
- Fazal Hussain (politician)
