= Nenashev =

Nenashev (Russian: Ненашев) is a Russian masculine surname, its feminine counterpart is Nenasheva. It may refer to

- Alexander Graf (born Alexander Nenashev in 1962), Uzbekistani-German chess grandmaster
- Mikhail Nenashev (1960–2021), Russian politician
- Stanislav Nenashev (born 1934), Soviet hammer thrower
