= In Gang-hwan =

South Korean hammer thrower (born 1917)

Personal information
- Nationality: South Korean
- Born: 7 January 1917
- Died: 14 July 1994

Sport
- Sport: Athletics
- Event: Hammer throw

In Gang-hwan (7 January 1917 ~ 14 July 1994) was a South Korean athlete. He competed in the men's hammer throw at the 1948 Summer Olympics.

In represented both South Korea and Japan internationally during his career. While representing Japan, he competed under the name Kokan In.
