= Dan Coyle =

Irish hammer thrower

Personal information
- Full name: Daniel Aloysius Coyle
- Nationality: Irish
- Born: 21 June 1913
- Died: 26 November 1972 (aged 59)

Sport
- Sport: Athletics
- Event: Hammer throw
- Club: Ireland Olympic team

Dan Coyle full name Daniel Aloysius Coyle (21 June 1913 – 26 November 1972) was an Irish athlete. He competed in the men's hammer throw at the 1948 Summer Olympics. he placed 19th in the qualifying round out of 24 meaning that he didn't qualify.
