= Heorhiy Dybenko =

Soviet hammer thrower (born 1928)

Personal information
- Nationality: Soviet
- Born: 1928 Kyiv, Ukrainian SSR

Sport
- Sport: Athletics
- Event: Hammer throw

Heorhiy Dybenko (Ukrainian: Георгій Дибенко; born 1928) is a Soviet former athlete. He competed in the men's hammer throw at the 1952 Summer Olympics.
