= Eric Johansson (athlete) =

Swedish hammer thrower (1904–1972)

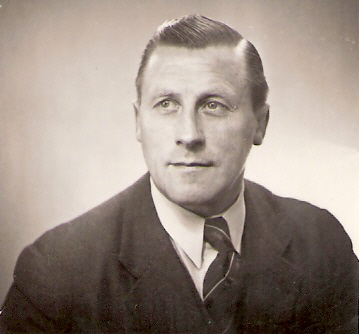

Personal information
- Born: 10 February 1904 Dalarna, Sweden
- Died: 22 February 1972 (aged 68)

Sport
- Sport: Athletics
- Event: Hammer throw

Achievements and titles
- Personal best: 56.79 m (1946)
Medal record
Men's athletics
Representing Sweden
European Championships
Silver medal – second place	1946 Oslo	Hammer throw

Eric Umedalen (born Johansson, 10 February 1904 – 22 February 1972) was a Swedish hammer thrower who won a silver medal at the 1946 European Championships.
