= Peter Allday =

British hammer thrower (1927–2018)

Personal information
- Nationality: British (English)
- Born: 27 June 1927 Wandsworth, London, England
- Died: 10 March 2018 (aged 90) Bexhill-on-Sea, England
- Height: 173 cm (5 ft 8 in)
- Weight: 75 kg (165 lb)

Sport
- Sport: Athletics
- Event: Hammer throw
- Club: London Athletic Club
Medal record
Athletics
Representing England
British Empire & Commonwealth Games
Bronze medal – third place	1958 Cardiff	hammer throw

Peter Charles Allday (27 June 1927 – 10 March 2018) was a British athlete who competed in the men's hammer throw at the 1952 Summer Olympics and the 1956 Summer Olympics.

== Biography ==
Allday took up the hammer throw event at the end of World War II, while stationed in Palestine. He won the Inter Counties title in 1950 and 1951.

Allday finished third behind Teseo Taddia in the hammer throw event at the 1951 AAA Championships and third behind Duncan Clark at the 1952 AAA Championships.

Shortly afterwards he represented the Great Britain team at the 1952 Olympic Games in Helsinki, where he finished 21st in the hammer throw competition.

In 1953, Allday married fellow athlete Suzanne Farmer. Allday improved to second place behind Don Anthony at the 1953 AAA Championships and represented the England team at the 1954 British Empire and Commonwealth Games in Vancouver.

He finally became the British hammer throw champion after winning the British AAA Championships title at the 1956 AAA Championships and later that year represented Great Britain at the 1956 Olympic Games in Melbourne.

Allday represented the England athletics team and won a bronze medal in the hammer throw at the 1958 British Empire and Commonwealth Games in Cardiff, Wales.

By the time he had retired he had represented Great Britain in 14 internationals from 1952 to 1962.
