= Karl Wolf (athlete) =

German hammer thrower

Personal information
- Nationality: German
- Born: 11 February 1912 Ladenburg, Grand Duchy of Baden, German Empire
- Died: 1 March 1975 (aged 63) Tübingen, West Germany

Sport
- Sport: Athletics
- Event: Hammer throw

Karl Wolf (11 February 1912 – 1 March 1975) was a German athlete. He competed in the men's hammer throw at the 1952 Summer Olympics.
