= Jack Lally (athlete) =

Northern Irish athlete

Jim Lally
Personal information
- Nationality: British (Northern Irish)
- Born: c.1930 Belfast
- Died: 17/04/2011 Warrenpoint County Down

Sport
- Sport: Athletics
- Events: Discus throw, Hammer throw
- Club: Albert Foundry AC

Jim Lally (born c.1930) is a former athlete from Northern Ireland, who represented Northern Ireland at the British Empire Games (now Commonwealth Games).

== Biography ==
Lally was a member of the Albert Foundry Athletic Club of Belfast and initially was an all-round athlete, competing in the 440 and 880 yards and the javelin. In 1953, he came under the coaching of a Greek trainer called J. Stamikis, while studying physical education at Loughborough College and switched events to the hammer and discus throws.

In May 1953, Lally won the British Universities Championship title and one year later became a physical education teacher at St Mary's Christian Brothers Grammar School, Barrack Street, Belfast.

He represented the 1954 Northern Irish Team at the 1954 British Empire and Commonwealth Games in Vancouver, Canada, participating in the hammer throw event. He reached the final of the hammer throw and finished seventh.

After the games he was given a civic reception by the Lord and Mayor and Lady Mayoress at the Belfast City Hall.
