= 1946 AAA Championships =

Outdoor track and field competition

- Dates: 19–20 July 1946
- Host city: London, England
- Venue: White City Stadium
- Level: Senior
- Type: Outdoor
- Events: 23

The 1946 AAA Championships was the 1946 edition of the annual outdoor track and field competition organised by the Amateur Athletic Association (AAA). It was held from 19 to 20 July 1946 at White City Stadium in London, England.

== Summary ==
The Championships consisted of 23 events and covered two days of competition. The attendance was 30,000.

It was the first championships to be held following the six years lost to World War II. The 10 miles and 440 yards relay events were not held.

Aad de Bruyn from the Netherlands retained his shot put title despite the six-year break. The Dutchman was the only athlete to retain a title, although Sydney Wooderson who won the 3 miles event and broke the British record had previously won the 1 mile event in 1939.

== Impact of WWII ==
The Championships returned after missing six years due to World War II. Many former AAA champions or medal winners, (some of whom would have competed at the 1946 Championships) had been killed in action from 1939 to 1946 as a result or cause of the war. They included -

- Douglas Bell
- (Poland) Janusz Kusociński
- (Finland) Martti Marttelin
- (France) Jules Noël
- (Poland) Józef Noji
- Patrick Ogilvie
- John Pendlebury
- (Belgium) Julien Saelens
- Sonny Spencer
- Arthur Sweeney
- John Thornton
- Eddie Webster
- (Germany) Hans Woellke

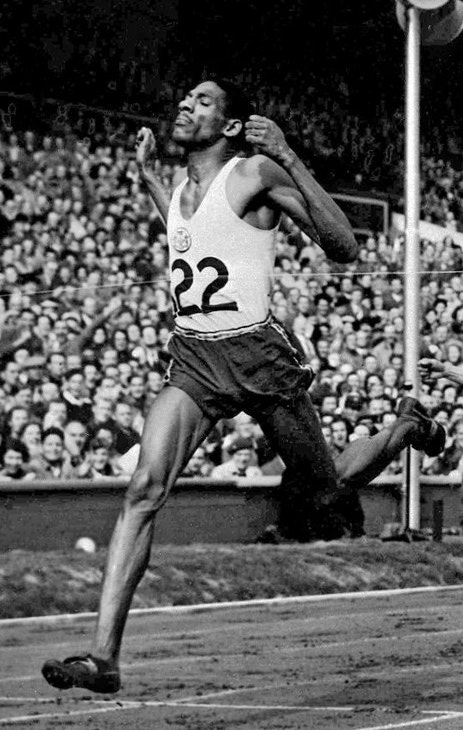
Jamaican Arthur Wint won both the 400 and 800 metres titles

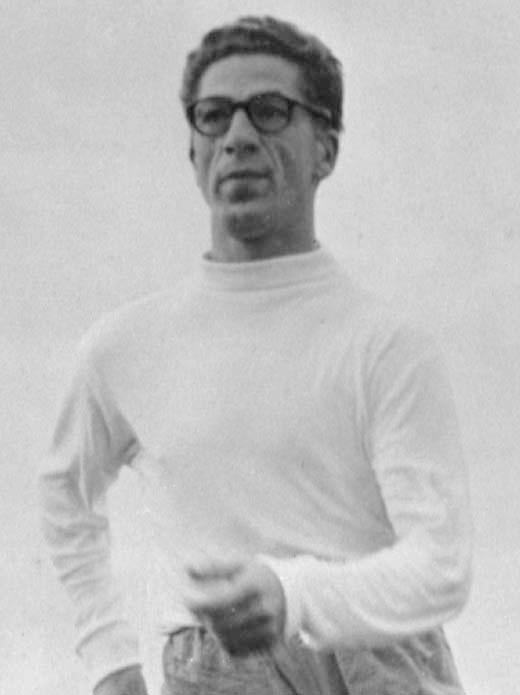
Swede Lars Hindmar won both the 2 and 7 miles walks

== Results ==
| Event | Gold | | Silver | | Bronze | |
|---|---|---|---|---|---|---|
| 100 yards | McDonald Bailey | 9.8 | Jack Archer | 10.1 | Bert Liffen | 10.1 |
| 220 yards | McDonald Bailey | 22.3 | Jack Archer | 2 yd | Bert Liffen | |
| 440 yards | Arthur Wint | 48.4 | Bill Roberts | 48.6 | Derek Pugh | 49.0 |
| 880 yards | Arthur Wint | 1:54.8 | Tom White | 1:55.2 | Geoffrey Dove | 1:55.4 |
| 1 mile | Doug Wilson | 4:17.4 | (Netherlands) Frits de Ruijter | 4:17.4 | Clifford Bunton | 4:20.6 |
| 3 miles | Sydney Wooderson | 13:53.2 NR | (Netherlands) Willem Slijkhuis | 13.54.2 | (Northern Ireland) Steven McCooke | 150 yds |
| 6 miles | Jim Peters | 30:50.4 | (Belgium) Jean Chapelle | 31:14.8 | David Wingate | 31:37.0 |
| marathon | Squire Yarrow | 2:43:14.4 | (Scotland) Donald Robertson | 2:43:14.6 | (Wales) Tom Richards | 2:44:10 |
| steeplechase | (Belgium) Marcel Vandewattyne | 10:27.6 | Albert Robertson | 15 yd | Edward Nankivell | |
| 120y hurdles | (Belgium) Pol Braekman | 14.9 | (Belgium) Pierre Van de Sijpe | 2 yd | Rupert Powell | |
| 440y hurdles | Ronald Ede | 57.0 | (Belgium) Robert Prevot | 1 yd | Robin Boyd | |
| 2 miles walk | (Sweden) Lars Hindmar | 13:59.0 | Harry Churcher | 14:04.6 | Eddie Staker | 14:16.0 |
| 7 miles walk | (Sweden) Lars Hindmar | 52:30.0 | Eddie Staker | 53:39.0 | Harry Churcher | 54:18.8 |
| high jump | (Scotland) Alan Paterson | 1.880 | Ron Pavitt | 1.854 | John Lunn Newman | 1.854 |
| pole vault | (Netherlands) Cor Lamorée | 3.91 | (Belgium) Frans Van Peteghem | 3.78 | John Dodd | 3.58 |
| long jump | Denis Watts | 7.11 | James Morrish | 6.96 | Harry Askew | 6.88 |
| triple jump | Denis Watts | 14.26 | Gordon Williams | 14.03 | (Belgium) Marcel Dennis | 13.69 |
| shot put | (Netherlands) Aad de Bruyn | 13.69 | (Republic of Ireland) James Byrne | 13.16 | Harold Moody | 12.58 |
| discus throw | (Netherlands) Jan Brasser | 43.56 | (Northern Ireland) James Nesbitt | 42.16 | (Netherlands) Aad de Bruyn | 40.61 |
| hammer throw | (Netherlands) Hans Houtzager | 48.48 | (Scotland) Duncan Clark | 47.79 | Norman Drake | 47.35 |
| javelin throw | (Netherlands) Nico Lutkeveld | 56.61 | Malcolm Dalrymple | 55.29 | Frederick Pidgeon | 55.19 |
| Tug of war (catchweight) | Wimpey London Airport C | | Wimpey London Airport A | | | |
| Tug of war (100st) | R.E.M.E No.1Central Workshop | | Cranleigh District British Legion | | | |

== See also ==
- 1946 WAAA Championships
