= Sverre Strandli =

Norwegian hammer thrower

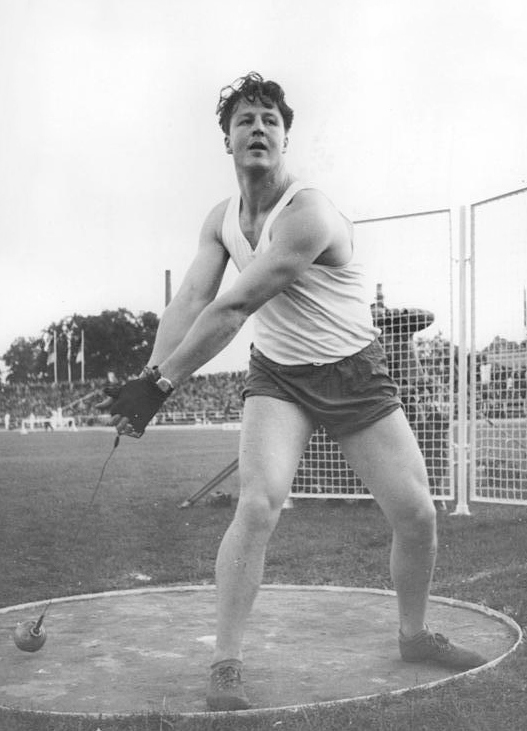
- Strandli in 1955

Personal information
- Born: 30 November 1925 Brandval, Norway
- Died: 4 March 1985 (aged 59) Charlottenberg, Sweden
- Height: 186 cm (6 ft 1 in)
- Weight: 93 kg (205 lb)

Sport
- Sport: Athletics
- Event: Hammer throw
- Club: Brandval IL; Sarpsborg IL

Achievements and titles
- Personal best: 63.88 (1962)
Medal record
Men's athletics
Representing Norway
European Championships
Gold medal – first place	1950 Brussels	Hammer throw
Silver medal – second place	1954 Bern	Hammer throw

Sverre Gunnar Strandli (30 November 1925 – 4 March 1985) was a Norwegian hammer thrower, who won the gold medal at the European Championships in 1950 and the silver medal in 1954.

At the Summer Olympics Strandli finished seventh in Helsinki 1952, eighth in Melbourne 1956 and eleventh in Rome 1960. He was the Norwegian Olympic flagbearer in 1960. At the 1962 European Championships he did not qualify for the final. He became Norwegian champion in the years 1949–1954, 1956–1957 and 1960–1962, and took one national title in shot put, in 1954. For his European Championships victory Strandli was selected Norwegian Sportsperson of the Year in 1950.

Strandli established two world records in hammer throw, both in Oslo. The first record of 61.25 metres came in September 1952 and the second of 62.36 metres was established a year later. The world record stood until August 1954, when Mikhail Krivonosov improved it to 63.34 m. For his second world record Strandli was selected Norwegian Sportsperson of the Year for a second time in 1953. He later set a personal best mark of 63.88 metres, in October 1962 in Trondheim, but at that point Hal Connolly had improved the world record to 70.67 metres.

Records
Preceded by (Hungary) József Csermák	Men's Hammer World Record Holder; 14 September 1952 – 29 August 1954	Succeeded by (Soviet Union) Mikhail Krivonosov
Awards
Preceded by Martin Stokken	Norwegian Sportsperson of the Year; 1950	Succeeded by Stein Eriksen
Preceded by Hjalmar Andersen	Norwegian Sportsperson of the Year; 1953	Succeeded by Stein Eriksen
