= József Csermák =

Hungarian hammer thrower

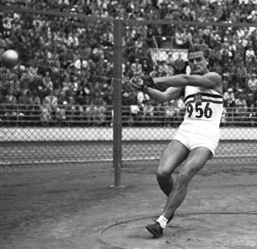
- Csermák at the 1952 Olympics

Personal information
- Born: 14 February 1932 Senec, Czechoslovakia
- Died: 12 January 2001 (aged 68) Tapolca, Hungary
- Height: 170 cm (5 ft 7 in)
- Weight: 89 kg (196 lb)

Sport
- Sport: Athletics
- Event: Hammer throw
- Club: Tapolcai Lokomotív; Tapolcai Törekvés; MÁV TI Atlétikai Club

Achievements and titles
- Personal best: 64.23 m (1960)
Medal record
Men's athletics
Representing Hungary
Olympic Games
Gold medal – first place	1952 Helsinki	Hammer throw
European Championships
Bronze medal – third place	1954 Bern	Hammer throw

József Csermák (14 February 1932 – 12 January 2001 in Tapolca) was a Hungarian hammer thrower. He won the gold medal at the 1952 Summer Olympics with a throw of 60.34 m, setting a new world record and becoming the first athlete to break the 60 m barrier. At the next Olympics Csermák was chosen as the Olympic flag bearer for Hungary, but placed only fifth. He failed to reach the final at the 1960 Olympics. Besides his 1952 Olympic gold medal, Csermák won four Hungarian titles and a bronze medal at the 1954 European Championships.

Csermák won the British AAA Championships title in the hammer throw event at the 1954 AAA Championships.

Records
Preceded by (Hungary) Imre Németh	Men's Hammer World Record Holder; 14 July 1952 – 14 September 1952	Succeeded by (Norway) Sverre Strandli
