= Bob Scott (hammer thrower) =

Scottish athlete

Personal information
- Nationality: British (Scottish)

Sport
- Sport: Athletics
- Event: Hammer throw
- Club: British Army AC; Glasgow University AC; Atalanta AC

Robert Shaw Scott is a former track and field athlete from Scotland who competed at the 1958 British Empire and Commonwealth Games (now Commonwealth Games).

== Biography ==
Scott was the British Army champion in 1956 and was demobbed in 1957. After the army he studied at the University of Glasgow and competed for their athletics club. By virtue of being a Scottish Universities' student he was able to represent the Atalanta Club.

In February 1958 he was named by the Scottish AAA in the 'possibles list' for the forthcoming Commonwealth and Empire Games and at the 1958 Scottish A.A.A. Championships, he won the hammer throw title.

He represented the Scottish Empire and Commonwealth Games team at the 1958 British Empire Games in Cardiff, Wales, participating in one event, the hammer throw.
