= Constantin Dumitru =

Romanian athlete

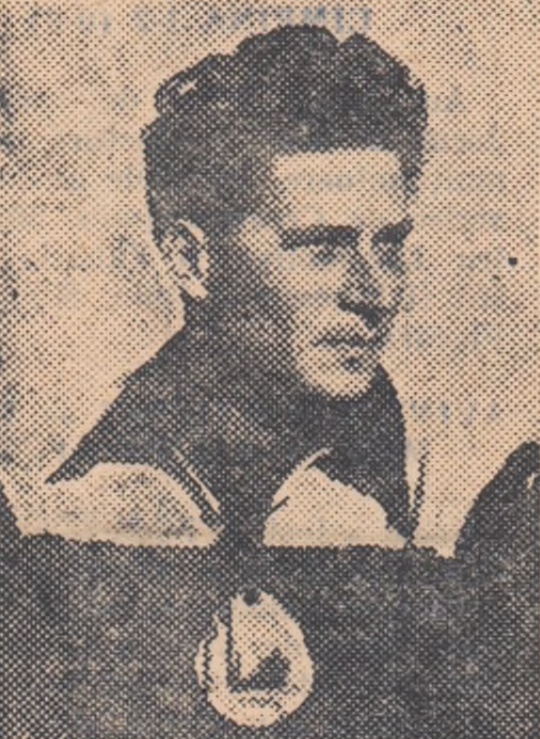

Personal information
- Nationality: Romanian
- Born: 29 April 1925 Bucharest, Romania
- Died: 1992 (aged 66–67)

Sport
- Sport: Athletics
- Event: Hammer throw

Constantin Dumitru (29 April 1925 – 1992) was a Romanian athlete. He competed in the men's hammer throw at the 1952 Summer Olympics.

Dumitru finished second behind Ewan Douglas in the hammer throw event at the British 1955 AAA Championships.
