= Einar Söderqvist =

Swedish athlete (1921–1996)

Personal information
- Nationality: Swedish
- Born: 24 December 1921 Örnsköldsvik, Sweden
- Died: 14 April 1996 (aged 74) Gävle, Sweden

Sport
- Sport: Athletics
- Event: Hammer throw

Einar Söderqvist (24 December 1921 – 14 April 1996) was a Swedish athlete. He competed in the men's hammer throw at the 1948 Summer Olympics.
