= Robert Bennett (athlete) =

American hammer thrower (1919–1974)

Olympic medal record

Men's athletics

Representing the United States
Bronze medal – third place	1948 London	Hammer throw

Robert Bennett (August 9, 1919 – December 13, 1974) was an American athlete who competed mainly in the hammer throw.

He competed for the United States in the 1948 Summer Olympics held in London, Great Britain in the hammer throw where he won the bronze medal.
