= Muhammad Iqbal (athlete) =

Pakistani hammer thrower (1927–1996)

Personal information
- Nationality: Pakistani
- Born: 12 July 1927 Murid, Sindh, British India
- Died: March 1996
- Height: 1.87 m (6 ft 2 in)
- Weight: 97 kg (214 lb)

Sport
- Sport: Athletics
- Event: Hammer throw
Medal record
Men's Athletics
Representing Pakistan
Event	1st	2nd	3rd
Asian Games	1	1	1
Commonwealth Games	1	1	1
Total	2	2	2
Commonwealth Games
Gold medal – first place	1954 Vancouver	Hammer throw
Silver medal – second place	1958 Cardiff	Hammer throw
Bronze medal – third place	1966 Kingston	Hammer throw
Asian Games
Gold medal – first place	1958 Tokyo	Hammer throw
Silver medal – second place	1954 Manila	Hammer throw
Bronze medal – third place	1962 Jakarta	Hammer throw

Muhammad Iqbal
- Awards: Pride of Performance award by the President of Pakistan in 1959

Muhammad Iqbal or Subedar Muhammad Iqbal (12 July 1927 - March 1996) was a Pakistani hammer thrower who competed at the 1952, 1956, and 1960 Summer Olympics.

Iqbal is regarded as one of the most renowned hammer thrower in South Asia’s history. He remains the only South Asian hammer thrower to have won a gold medal at both the Commonwealth Games (Vancouver 1954) and the Asian Games (Tokyo 1958). He was also the flag bearer for Pakistan at the 1960 Rome Olympics.

== Biography ==
Muhammad Iqbal was born on 12 July 1927 at Murid, Sindh, British India. Like many Pakistani athletes in the country's early years, Iqbal was an employee in the Pakistan Army. He also participated in the World Military Games.

Iqbal won the silver medal at the 1954 Asian Games held in Manila. At the 1958 Asian Games, in Tokyo, his gold-medal-winning throw of 60.96 meters was an Asian Games record.

Iqbal qualified for the finals in both the 1956 and 1960 Summer Olympics, where he finished 11th and 12th respectively.

At the 1962 Asian Games in Jakarta, Iqbal secured the bronze medal.

Iqbal also participated in four consecutive Commonwealth Games. In the 1954 edition, he won the gold at Vancouver, followed by a silver at Cardiff in 1958. He missed out on a medal in 1962 but secured another bronze at Kingston in 1966 at the age of 39.

Iqbal finished runner-up three times behind Mike Ellis at the British AAA Championships in 1958, 1959 and 1960.

== Awards ==
Ribbon	Decoration	Country	Year
	Pride of Performance	Pakistan	1959

Iqbal was awarded the Pride of Performance Award in 1959 by President of Pakistan in recognition of his outstanding achievements and contributions to athletics.

== See also ==
- List of Pakistani records in athletics
- Athletics in Pakistan
- Pakistan at the Olympics
