= Stanislav Nenashev =

Soviet hammer thrower

Stanislav Nenashev (Russian: Станислав Ненашев; born 18 March 1934 in Baku, Azerbaijani SSR) is a Soviet athlete who was a world record holder (12 December 1954 - 4 August 1955) in the hammer throw (64.05 m). In 1950, Nenashev was ranked as ninth among track and field athletes in the Soviet Union. Despite having broken the world record, Nenashev was never selected to represent the Soviet Union at the Olympic Games.

Records
Preceded by (Soviet Union) Mikhail Krivonosov	Men's Hammer World Record Holder; 12 December 1954 – 4 August 1955	Succeeded by (Soviet Union) Mikhail Krivonosov
