= Norman Drake =

British athlete

Personal information
- Nationality: British (English)
- Born: 7 July 1912 Retford, England
- Died: 16 November 1972 (aged 60) Blackpool, England

Sport
- Sport: Athletics
- Event: Hammer throw
- Club: Sutton-in-Ashfield Harriers; Doncaster LNER

Norman Percy Drake (7 July 1912 – 16 November 1972) was a British athlete who competed in the men's hammer throw at the 1936 Summer Olympics and the 1948 Summer Olympics.

== Biography ==
Drake represented England at the 1934 British Empire Games in the hammer throw.

Drake became the national hammer throw champion after winning the British AAA Championships title at the 1936 AAA Championships and finished second behind Bert Healion in the hammer throw event at the 1939 AAA Championships before his career was interrupted by World War II.

After World War II, Drake finished second behind Hans Houtzager at the 1946 AAA Championships before winning a final hammer throw AAA title at the 1948 AAA Championships.

He was part of the England team at the 1950 British Empire Games in Auckland, New Zealand, where he competed in the hammer and shot put.

In 1951 Drake won his final Northern title (he had won the title every year since 1934) and went on to become a hammer throw coach.
