= Aad de Bruyn =

Dutch athlete

Personal information
- Born: 30 January 1910 The Hague, Netherlands
- Died: 28 July 1991 (aged 81) Eindhoven, Netherlands

Sport
- Sport: Athletics
- Event: Shot put/Hammer/Discus
- Club: Vlug & Lening
Medal record
Shot put
Representing Netherlands
Dutch National Championships
1st	1932
1st	1934
1st	1935
1st	1936
1st	1937
1st	1938
1st	1939
1st	1940
1st	1941
1st	1942
1st	1943
1st	1944
1st	1946
1st	1947
1st	1948
1st	1949
AAA Championships
1st	1935
1st	1936
1st	1939
1st	1946
Discus
Representing Netherlands
1st	1933
1st	1934
1st	1935
1st	1936
1st	1938
1st	1939
1st	1940
1st	1941
1st	1942
1st	1943
1st	1944
1st	1948
1st	1950
1st	1951
Hammer throw
Representing Netherlands
1st	1937
2nd	1939
1st	1941
1st	1943
1st	1944
1st	1954

Adriaan Gerard Joannes de Bruyn (30 January 1910 – 28 July 1991), was a Dutch athlete who competed in the throwing disciplines of the discus, shot put and hammer throw, dominated all three events in the Netherlands in the 1930s and 1940s and was selected for the 1948 Summer Olympics.

== Biography ==
Born in the Netherlands, he was the Dutch national shot put champion on multiple occasions, first winning the title in 1932 and repeating the feat in 1934. He remained champion through to 1944 and regained the title in 1946, holding it until 1949. As a shotputter he also won the British AAA Championships title on four occasions at the 1935 AAA Championships, 1936 AAA Championships, 1939 AAA Championships and 1946 AAA Championships.

He set the Dutch National Record of 14.165m in 1934 and increased this in increments that year up to 14.535m. In 1935, he became the first Dutchman to break the 15m mark, setting a record of 15.02m. By 1939, he had increased this to 15.51m a record that stood until 1986.

As a discus thrower he was the national champion from 1933 to 1936, from 1938 to 1944, and in 1948, 1950 and 1951. His 1942 mark of 48.575m stood as the national record until 1956.

He was also the national hammer throw champion in 1937, 1941, 1943, 1944 and 1954.

De Bruyn died of cardiac arrest while watching the shot-put event on the last day of the Dutch National Championships held 26–28 July 1991 in Eindhoven.
