= Svend Aage Frederiksen =

Danish hammer thrower

Personal information
- Nationality: Danish
- Born: 5 April 1920 Bogense, Denmark
- Died: 16 June 1999 (aged 79) Nyborg, Denmark

Sport
- Sport: Athletics
- Event: Hammer throw

Svend Aage Frederiksen (5 April 1920 – 16 June 1999) was a Danish athlete. He competed in the men's hammer throw at the 1948 Summer Olympics.
