= Oiva Halmetoja =

Finnish hammer thrower

Personal information
- Nationality: Finnish
- Born: 31 March 1920 Maaninka, Finland
- Died: 21 February 2007 (aged 86) Varkaus, Finland

Sport
- Sport: Athletics
- Event: Hammer throw

Oiva Halmetoja (31 March 1920 – 21 February 2007) was a Finnish athlete. He competed in the men's hammer throw at the 1952 Summer Olympics.
