= Miloš Máca =

Czech hammer thrower

Personal information
- Nationality: Czech
- Born: 23 January 1927 Boskovice, Czechoslovakia
- Died: 27 March 1984 (aged 57)

Sport
- Sport: Athletics
- Event: Hammer throw

Miloš Máca (23 January 1927 – 27 March 1984) was a Czech athlete. He competed in the men's hammer throw at the 1952 Summer Olympics.
