= Fazal Hussain (athlete) =

Pakistani athlete

Personal information
- Nationality: Pakistani
- Born: 11 November 1929

Sport
- Sport: Athletics
- Event: Hammer throw

Fazal Hussain (born 11 November 1929) is a Pakistani former athlete. He competed in the men's hammer throw at the 1952 Summer Olympics.
