= Aleksandr Kanaki =

Russian decathlete and hammer thrower

Personal information
- Born: 29 March 1912
- Died: 1995
- Height: 190 cm (6 ft 3 in)
- Weight: 120 kg (265 lb)

Sport
- Sport: Athletics
- Events: Hammer throw, shot put, decathlon

Achievements and titles
- Personal bests: HT – 58.59 m (1949); SP – 15.53 m (1938) decathlon – 6595 (1937)

Aleksandr Spiridonovich Kanaki (Russian: Александр Спиридонович Канаки, 29 March 1912 – 1995) was a Soviet athlete. He initially competed in decathlon and placed third at the 1936 Soviet Championships. During World War II his right hand was irreversibly injured in action. Hence after the war Kanaki changed to hammer throw, where his handicap was less impeding than in other throwing events. He set multiple records in hammer throw in the late 1940s and placed fifth at the 1950 European Championships.
