= Belarusian State University of Physical Culture =

Public university in Minsk, Belarus

Coordinates: 53°56′08″N 27°29′23″E

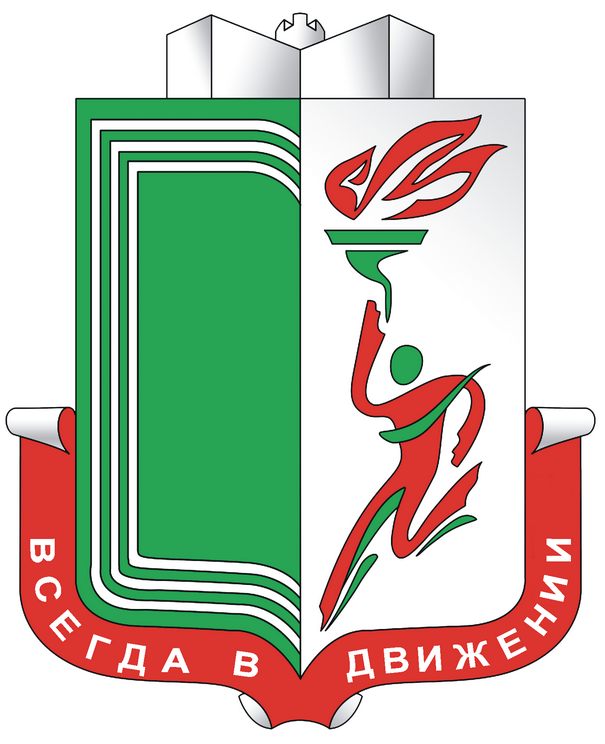
Logo

Belarusian State University of Physical Culture (Belarusian: Беларускі дзяржаўны ўніверсітэт фізічнай культуры; Russian: Белорусский государственный университет физической культуры) is a university in Minsk, Belarus. University is an institution in the field of physical education, sports and tourism in the Republic of Belarus offering preparatory, high and post-graduate levels of training. There are 160 World and European champions among the University students and graduates.

== Structure ==
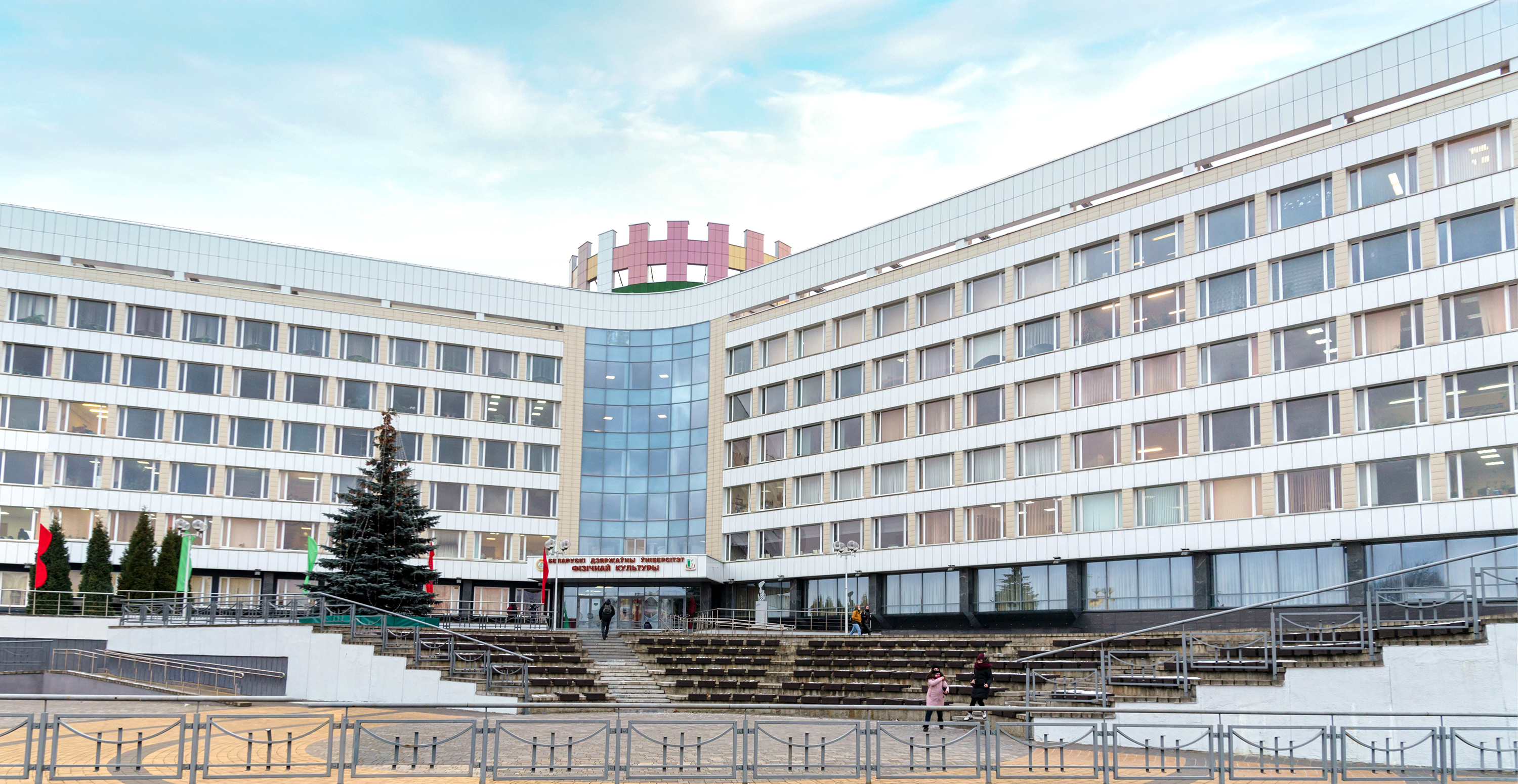
Main building

There are 4 faculties, 27 chairs: Departments:

Faculty of Sport Games and Combative Sport

Faculty of Mass Sports

The Faculty of Health – Oriented Physical Training and Tourism

Institute of Tourism

Specialists Updating and Retraining Institute

== Administration ==
Rector - Ryhor Kasiachenka

== Well known graduates ==
Among those who graduated from the University we can also name the Olympic champions Svetlana Boginskaya, Vitaly Scherbo, Marina Lobach, Alexander Medved, Oleg Karavayev, Vladimir Kaminsky, Oleg Logvin, Alexander Romankov, Romuald Klim, Elena Zvereva, Yanina Korolchik, Vladimir Parfenovich, Yekaterina Karsten and others.
