= Duncan Clark (athlete) =

Scottish hammer thrower

Personal information
- Born: 22 June 1915 Greenock, Scotland
- Died: 8 July 2003 (aged 88) Whakatāne, New Zealand

Sport
- Sport: Athletics
- Event: Hammer throw
- Club: Greenock AC; Royal Ulster Constabulary AC
Medal record
Men's athletics
Representing Great Britain
European Championships
| Bronze medal – third place | 1946 Oslo | Hammer throw |
Representing Scotland
British Empire Games
| Gold medal – first place | 1950 Auckland | Hammer throw |

Duncan McDougall Munro Clark (22 June 1915 – 8 July 2003) was an Olympic track and field athlete from Scotland.

== Biography ==
Born in Greenock, Clark specialised in hammer throw events during his career and finished third behind Bert Healion in the hammer throw event at the 1938 AAA Championships and the 1939 AAA Championships before his career was interrupted by World War II.

After the war Clark finished second behind Hans Houtzager at the 1946 AAA Championships and then won a bronze medal in the Hammer throw event at the 1946 European Athletics Championships.

Third behind Imre Németh at the 1947 AAA Championships was followed by another second place at the 1948 AAA Championships behind Norman Drake. Representation for the Great Britain team ensued at the 1948 Olympic Games in London.

He represented the Scotland team at the 1950 British Empire Games in Auckland, New Zealand and won the gold medal in the hammer throw competition. A few months later he finally became British hammer throw champion after winning the AAA Championships title at the 1950 AAA Championships and competed in the 1950 European Athletics Championships.

Clark represented the Great Britain team at the 1952 Olympic Games in Helsinki and won a second AAA title at the 1952 AAA Championships.

Clark died on 8 July 2003 in Whakatāne, New Zealand, aged 88.
