= Mikhail Krivonosov =

Belarusian hammer thrower

Personal information
- Native name: Михаил Летрович Кривосов
- Full name: Mikhail Petrovich Krivonosov
- Born: 1 May 1929 Krichev, Byelorussian SSR, Soviet Union
- Died: 11 November 1994 (aged 65) Krichev, Belarus
- Education: Belarusian State University of Physical Training
- Height: 1.89 m (6 ft 2 in)
- Weight: 90 kg (198 lb)

Sport
- Country: Soviet Union
- Sport: Athletics
- Event: Hammer throw
- Club: Burevestnik Minsk
- Coached by: Evgeny Shukevich

Achievements and titles
- Personal best: 67.32 m (1956)
Medal record
Men's athletics
Representing the Soviet Union
Olympic Games
Silver medal – second place	1956 Melbourne	Hammer throw
European Championships
Gold medal – first place	1954 Berne	Hammer throw
Silver medal – second place	1958 Stockholm	Hammer throw

Mikhail Petrovich Krivonosov (Russian: Михаил Петрович Кривоносов, 1 May 1929 – 11 November 1994) was a Belarusian hammer thrower. He competed in the 1952 and 1956 Olympics and won a silver medal in 1956, 18 cm behind the first place. He earned another silver medal at the 1958 European Championships, and won the European title in 1954.

In 1953 Krivonosov graduated from the Belarusian State University of Physical Training, and in 1971 defended a PhD in pedagogy there. He trained at Burevestnik in Minsk and competed internationally for the USSR throughout his career. He won the Soviet title in 1952 and 1954–58 and set six world records in 1954–56. After retiring from competitions he had a long career as an athletics coach and prepared the Soviet hammer throwers for the 1968 and 1972 Olympics. In parallel he worked as a lecturer at his alma mater, where he served as pro-rector from 1976 until his death.

Krivonosov had an elder sister Nina. Besides athletics he was an accomplished swimmer and cross-country skier and a lifelong fan of angling.

Records
Preceded by (Norway) Sverre Strandli	Men's Hammer World Record Holder; 29 August 1954 – 12 December 1954	Succeeded by (Soviet Union) Stanislav Nenashev
Preceded by (Soviet Union) Stanislav Nenashev	Men's Hammer World Record Holder; 4 August 1955 – 2 November 1956	Succeeded by (United States) Harold Connolly
