= Mykola Redkin =

Ukrainian hammer thrower

Personal information
- Nationality: Ukrainian
- Born: 10 June 1928 Dnipropetrovsk, Ukrainian SSR, USSR

Sport
- Sport: Athletics
- Event: Hammer throw

Mykola Redkin (Ukrainian: Микола Редькін; born 10 June 1928) is a Ukrainian former athlete. He competed in the men's hammer throw at the 1952 Summer Olympics, representing the Soviet Union.
