= Roger Veeser =

Swiss hammer thrower (1919–2010)

Personal information
- Nationality: Swiss
- Born: 8 September 1919
- Died: 27 February 2010 (aged 90)

Sport
- Sport: Athletics
- Event: Hammer throw

Roger Veeser (8 September 1919 – 27 February 2010) was a Swiss athlete. He competed in the men's hammer throw at the 1952 Summer Olympics.
