= Charles Reidy =

British Army officer, hammer thrower and rugby player

Charles Reidy OBE
- Full name: Charles James Reidy
- Born: 8 July 1912 London, England
- Died: 15 July 2004 (aged 92) Birmingham, England
- School: Stonyhurst College
- University: University of Cambridge

Rugby union career
- Position: Prop
International career
Years	Team	Apps	(Points)
1937	Ireland	1	(0)

Lieutenant colonel Charles James Reidy (8 July 1912 — 15 July 2004) was a British Army officer, hammer thrower and Ireland international rugby union player.

Born in London, Reidy attended Stonyhurst College and was active in rugby union before the war, playing with his brothers for London Irish. He was capped once for Ireland, as a prop against Wales at Belfast in 1937.

Reidy served with the 2nd Battalion of the London Irish Rifles, in Tunisia during World War II. On the night of 26 February 1943, Reidy was badly when a bomb exploded in his tench. The blast impact threw him from the trench and he was left permanently blind in one eye, also losing his sense of smell.

A five-time national champion, Reidy took up hammer throw after the war and made the Ireland athletics team for the 1952 Summer Olympics in Helsinki, but was unable to make the trip due to work commitments.

== See also ==
- List of Ireland national rugby union players
