= Hunter's Tryst =

Inn and area of Edinburgh, Scotland

Coordinates: 55°54′6.82″N 3°13′16.33″W

Hunter's Tryst (/ˈhʌntərz.ˈtraɪst/) is the name of a long-established inn in Edinburgh, Scotland; it has lent its name to the surrounding area, near Fairmilehead.

The inn, once well outside Edinburgh's built-up area, was a popular leisure destination and was a meeting place of the Six Foot Club. The area was written about by Robert Louis Stevenson who, along with Sir Walter Scott were honorary members of the Six Foot Club (being too short to be full members).

Today the inn is surrounded by modern housing estates and is next to a Morrisons supermarket.

It is served by several Lothian Buses routes - services 5 and 27 commence or terminate at Hunter's Tryst, with services 4, 16 and Skylink 400 passing nearby. Hunter's Tryst was also formerly served by service 16 (now serving Colinton, Bonaly and Terminating at Torphin), service 17 (terminus was later changed to Craighouse and Granton before later being withdrawn), service 18 (running from Fort Kinnaird to Gyle Centre, later extended to Edinburgh Airport and renumbered to Skylink 400), service 32 (inner circle) and service 52 (outer circle) (Oxgangs - Wester Hailes - Granton - Leith - Portobello - Niddrie - Kaimes) which were partially replaced by service 18.

== Bibliography ==
1. Cant, Michael, Villages of Edinburgh volumes 1 & 2, John Donald Publishers Ltd., Edinburgh, 1986-1987. ISBN 0-85976-131-2 & ISBN 0-85976-186-X
2. Grant, James, Old and new Edinburgh volumes 1-3 (or 1-6, edition dependent), Cassell, 1880s (published as a periodical): Online edition
