= Hal Connolly =

American athlete

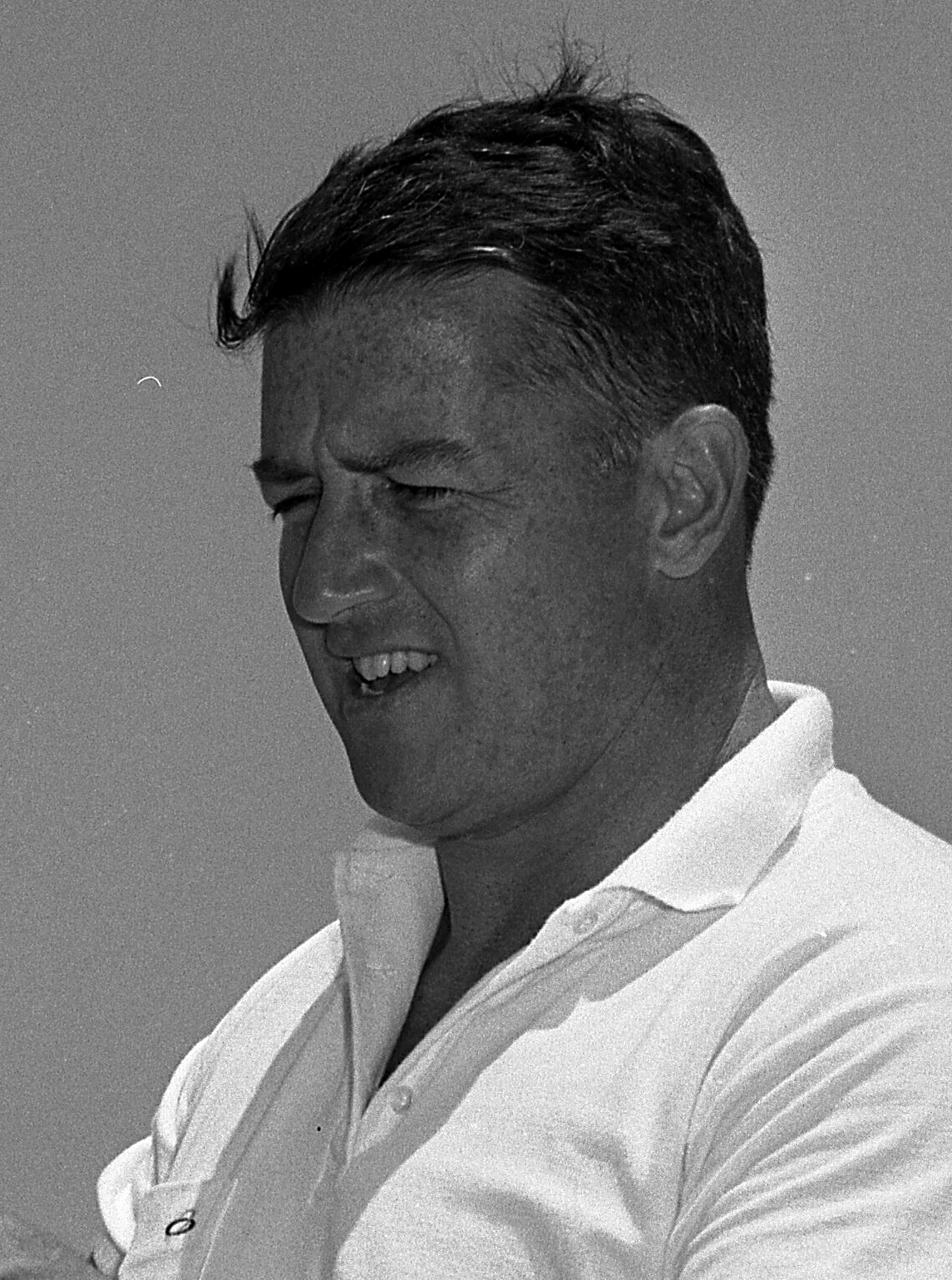
- Hal Connolly in 1964

Personal information
- Born: August 1, 1931 Somerville, Massachusetts, United States
- Died: August 18, 2010 (aged 79) Catonsville, Maryland, United States
- Height: 1.83 m (6 ft 0 in)
- Weight: 106 kg (234 lb)
- Spouses: Olga Fikotová (1957-1975); Pat Daniels (1976-2010)

Sport
- Country: United States
- Sport: Athletics
- Events: Hammer throw, shot put
- Club: Southern California Striders, Anaheim

Achievements and titles
- Personal bests: HT – 71.26 m (1965); SP – 14.72 m (1951)
Medal record
Representing the United States
Olympic Games
Gold medal – first place	1956 Melbourne	Hammer throw

Harold Vincent "Hal" Connolly (August 1, 1931 – August 18, 2010) was an American athlete and hammer thrower from Somerville, Massachusetts. He won a gold medal in the hammer throw at the 1956 Summer Olympics in Melbourne. Connolly became the first American to throw a hammer more than 200 feet. He set his first of six world records just prior to the 1956 Olympics, and held the world record for nearly 10 years.

After his gold medal, Connolly competed in three more Olympics, finishing eighth in 1960, sixth in 1964 and not qualifying for the final in 1968. In 1972, he finished fifth in the United States trials and failed to make the team.

Connolly sustained severe nerve damage to his left arm during birth, prohibiting the limb from ever developing properly. He fractured it 13 times as a child. His left arm grew to be four and a half inches shorter than his right and his left hand two-thirds the size of his right. The New York Times noted, "When he won his Olympic gold medal, photographers yelled at him to raise his arms in triumph. He lifted only his right arm."

Connolly received his undergraduate degree from Boston College in 1952 and attended graduate school at UCLA. Both during and after his athletic career, Connolly worked as a teacher in the Santa Monica school system. In 1988, he then retired and accepted a position as an executive director of Special Olympics, where he would serve for the next 11 years. Until his death, he coached youth athletes and served as the Junior Hammer Development Chairmen for US Track and Field Association. He was one of the leading promoters for the next generation of hammer throwers.

== Personal life ==
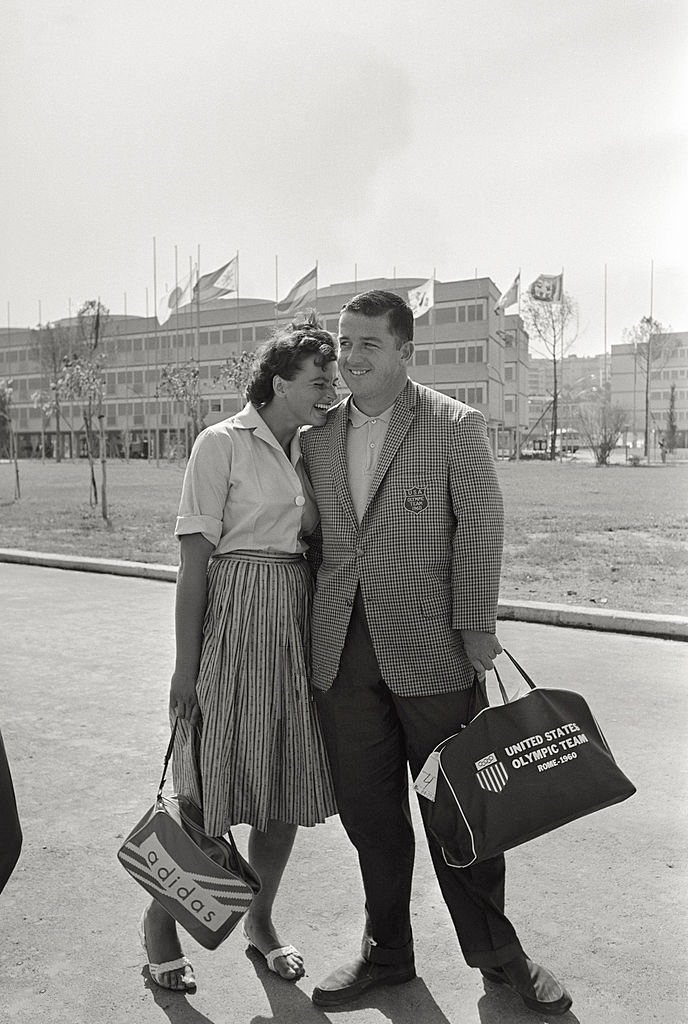
Olga Fikotova and Hal Connolly at the 1960 Olympics

During the 1956 Games, Connolly began a relationship with Czech discus thrower Olga Fikotova, a fellow gold medal winner. They married after the Olympics, the following year in Prague—in three ceremonies there, with a celebration before 40,000 well-wishers. The best man at their wedding ceremony was Czech runner Emil Zátopek. They were divorced in 1975, and the following year, he married Pat Winslow, a former coach of track star Evelyn Ashford and herself a three-time Olympian in the 800 meters and pentathlon.

A son from his first marriage, Jim Connolly, was the NCAA decathlon champion for UCLA in 1987; Adam Connolly, a son from his second marriage, was America's third-ranked hammer thrower in 1999.

== Awards ==
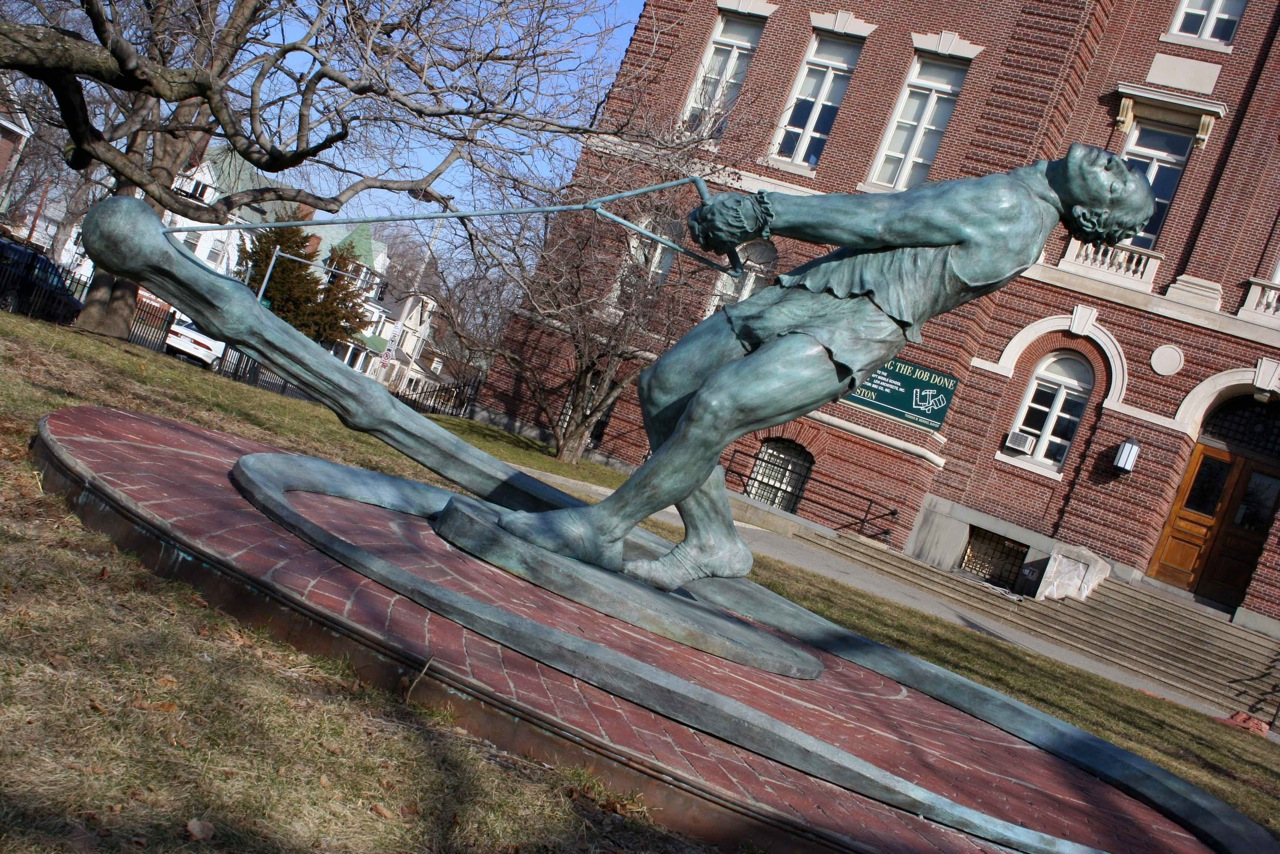
This bronze statue of Connolly, located at the former Taft Middle School in Brighton, Massachusetts, was installed in December 2005.

In 1984 Connolly was elected into the National Track and Field Hall of Fame.

A statue of Connolly is located at the former Taft Elementary School in Brighton, Massachusetts, and depicts his gold medal-winning hammer throw at the 1956 Olympic Games.

Records
Preceded by (Soviet Union) Mikhail Krivonosov	Men's Hammer World Record Holder; November 2, 1956 – September 4, 1965	Succeeded by (Hungary) Gyula Zsivótzky
