= Bo Ericson (athlete) =

Swedish hammer thrower (1919–1970)

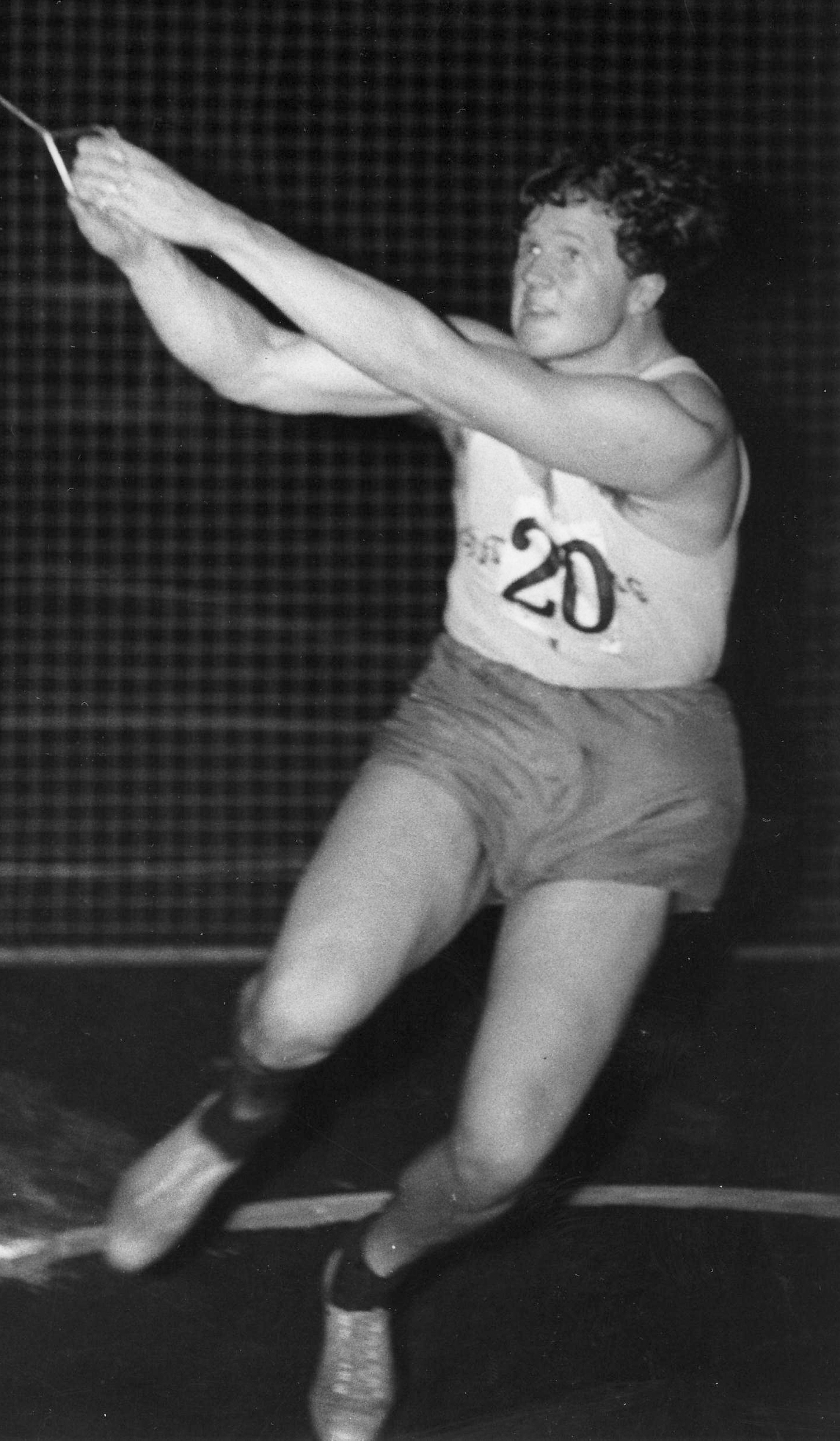

Personal information
- Born: 28 January 1919 Frölunda, Sweden
- Died: 14 February 1970 (aged 51) Karlstad, Sweden
- Height: 1.88 m (6 ft 2 in)
- Weight: 103 kg (227 lb)

Sport
- Sport: Athletics
- Event: Hammer throw
- Club: Örgryte IS, Göteborg

Achievements and titles
- Personal best: 57.19 m (1947)
Medal record
Men's athletics
Representing Sweden
European Championships
Gold medal – first place	1946 Oslo	Hammer throw

Bo Evert Ericson (28 January 1919 – 14 February 1970) was a Swedish hammer thrower who won a gold medal at the 1946 European Athletics Championships in Oslo with a throw of 56.44 metres. He was also a finalist at the 1948 Olympics in London, but he finished in sixth place with a throw of 52.98 metres.

Ericson twice broke the Swedish national record for the hammer throw–in 1941 with a throw of 56.66 metres and, secondly, in 1947 with a throw of 57.19 metres–and held the record outright from 1941 until 1955. He was a ten-time winner of the hammer throw at the Swedish national championships.
