= Jaroslav Knotek =

Czech athlete (1912–1996)

Personal information
- Nationality: Czechoslovak
- Born: 29 June 1912 Žichovice, Bohemia, Austria-Hungary
- Died: 18 March 1996 (aged 83) Ústí nad Labem, Czech Republic

Sport
- Sport: Athletics
- Event: Hammer throw

Jaroslav Knotek (29 June 1912 – 18 March 1996) was a Czech athlete. He competed for Czechoslovakia in the men's hammer throw at the 1936 Summer Olympics and the 1948 Summer Olympics.
