= Karl Storch =

German hammer thrower (1913–1992)

Olympic medal record

Men's Athletics

Representing Germany
Silver medal – second place	1952 Helsinki	Hammer throw

Karl Storch (21 August 1913 – 16 August 1992) was a German athlete, who mainly competed in the hammer throw. He was born in Fulda.

The member of SC Borussia Fulda competed for Germany in the 1952 Summer Olympics held in Helsinki, Finland in the hammer throw where he won the silver medal (invalid - 56,45m - 58,18m - 58,86m - 57,80m - 58,38m).

The coal dealer, father of four daughters, stood 1,84m, with a weight of 110 kg in competition.

Karl Storch was awarded the Rudolf Harbig-Gedächtnispreis in 1954.
