= Lauri Tamminen =

Finnish hammer thrower

Personal information
- Nationality: Finnish
- Born: 1 December 1919 Helsinki, Finland
- Died: 2 December 2010 (aged 91) Lipen, Bulgaria

Sport
- Sport: Athletics
- Event: Hammer throw

Lauri Tamminen (1 December 1919 – 2 December 2010) was a Finnish athlete. He competed in the men's hammer throw at the 1948 Summer Olympics and the 1952 Summer Olympics.
