= Samuel Felton (hammer thrower) =

American hammer thrower

Sam Felton
Personal information
- Nationality: American
- Born: May 26, 1926 New York City, United States
- Died: December 24, 2015 (aged 89) Bar Harbor, United States

Sport
- Sport: Athletics
- Event: Hammer throw

Samuel Felton (Samuel Morse "Sam" Felton, Jr.; May 26, 1926 – December 24, 2015) was an American athlete. He competed in the men's hammer throw at the 1948 Summer Olympics and the 1952 Summer Olympics. He graduated from Harvard University and Harvard Business School.

Felton was an All-American for the Harvard Crimson track and field team in 1948. Despite competing for the same school, he is not related to Harvard football and baseball player Sam Felton.
