= Poul Cederquist =

Danish hammer thrower

Personal information
- Nationality: Danish
- Born: 29 June 1916 Copenhagen, Denmark
- Died: 25 May 1993 (aged 76) Odense, Denmark

Sport
- Sport: Athletics
- Event: Hammer throw

Poul Cederquist (29 June 1916 – 25 May 1993) was a Danish athlete. He competed in the men's hammer throw at the 1948 Summer Olympics and the 1952 Summer Olympics.
