= Imre Németh =

Hungarian hammer thrower

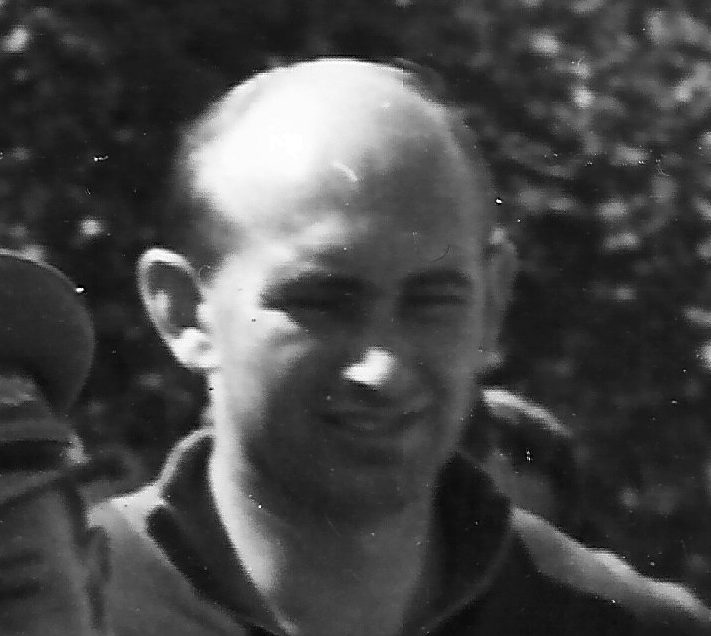

Personal information
- Nationality: Hungarian
- Born: 23 September 1917 Kassa, Austria-Hungary
- Died: 18 August 1989 (aged 71) Budapest, Hungary
- Height: 184 cm (6 ft 0 in)
- Weight: 82 kg (181 lb)

Sport
- Sport: Athletics
- Event: hammer throw
- Club: Vasas, Budapest
Medal record
Men's athletics
Representing Hungary
Olympic Games
Gold medal – first place	1948 London	Hammer throw
Bronze medal – third place	1952 Helsinki	Hammer throw

Imre Németh (23 September 1917 – 18 August 1989) was a Hungarian hammer thrower.

Németh was born in Kassa, Hungary (now Košice, Slovakia) in 1917. He won the gold medal at the 1948 Summer Olympics in London, Great Britain. He returned four years later to defend his title at the 1952 Summer Olympics held in Helsinki, Finland but failed, only managing to finish third for the bronze medal.

Németh broke the world record on three occasions. On 14 July 1948 he threw 59.02 metres, beating Erwin Blask's official record from 1938 by two centimetres. (However, this was still inferior to Pat O'Callaghan's unratified record of 59.56, dating back to 1937.) On 4 September 1949 Németh improved the world mark to 59.57, beating both the official and the unofficial record. Finally, on 19 May 1950 Németh threw 59.88 m in Budapest.

Némethwon the British AAA Championships title in the hammer throw event at the 1947 AAA Championships and 1949 AAA Championships.

Németh died in Budapest in 1989. His son, javelin thrower Miklós Németh, also won an Olympic gold medal.

Records
Preceded by (Germany) Erwin Blask	Men's Hammer World Record Holder; 14 July 1948 – 24 July 1952	Succeeded by (Hungary) József Csermák
