= Don Anthony =

British hammer thrower

Don Anthony MBE
Personal information
- Nationality: British (English)
- Born: 6 November 1928 Watford, Hertfordshire, England
- Died: 28 May 2012 (aged 83)
- Height: 175 cm (5 ft 9 in)
- Weight: 96 kg (212 lb)

Sport
- Sport: Athletics
- Event: Hammer throw
- Club: Watford Harriers; Polytechnic Harriers

Donald William James Anthony MBE (6 November 1928 – 28 May 2012) was a British hammer thrower who competed at the 1956 Summer Olympics.

== Biography ==
Anthony was educated at Watford Boys Grammar School. He became the British hammer throw champion after winning the British AAA Championships title at the 1953 AAA Championships.

Anthony placed fourth for England at the 1954 Empire Games in Vancouver. The former Watford Harrier held the England record in the event which he broke several times during his decade long international athletics career. He later competed for Polytechnic Harriers. He was a founder member of the Hammer Circle.

Anthony finished runner-up in both the 1956 AAA Championships and 1957 AAA Championships. He was also selected for the England athletics team at the 1958 British Empire and Commonwealth Games in Cardiff, Wales.

It was as an administrator, educator and sporting pioneer that he truly made his mark. Whilst on National Service in Cyprus in 1955, Anthony first played the game of volleyball and, on his return home to a job as an assistant lecturer at Manchester University he established a national governing body for the sport. Anthony remained president of England Volleyball. Volleyball England's Hall of Fame bears his name.

He traveled the world to promote peace and the values of the Olympic Games through UNESCO and the Olympic Solidarity movement. He was a familiar face at the International Olympic Academy in Greece and oversaw the establishment of Britain's own National Olympic Academy in 1982.

As a journalist, he was responsible for uncovering much of Britain's early Olympic heritage and also ensured that William Penny Brookes’ Olympian Games in Much Wenlock received their rightful place in the history of the modern Games. In 1994, Anthony welcomed Juan Antonio Samaranch to Much Wenlock to mark the centenary of the IOC. Wenlock was the name of one of the London 2012 games mascots.

He worked closely with Baron Pierre de Coubertin’s great nephew, Antoine de Navacelle, in the establishment of the Coubertin awards which combined sport with the world of business ethics.

Anthony was appointed Member of the Order of the British Empire (MBE) in the 2011 Birthday Honours for services to sport. He died in May 2012.
