= Jiří Dadák =

Czech athlete

Medal record

Men's athletics

Representing Czechoslovakia

European Championships
Bronze medal – third place	1950 Brussels	Hammer throw

Jiří Dadák (7 March 1926 in Valašské Meziříčí – 6 March 2014) was a Czech athlete who specialized in hammer throw.

== Career ==
Dadák won a bronze medal in the 1950 European Athletics Championships in Brussels. Two years later, he represented Czechoslovakia at the Summer Olympics in Helsinki, where he finished fourth with a result of 56.81 meters. He took part in the 1954 European Athletics Championships in Bern, Switzerland, finishing in the ninth place (55.66 m).

== Gallery ==
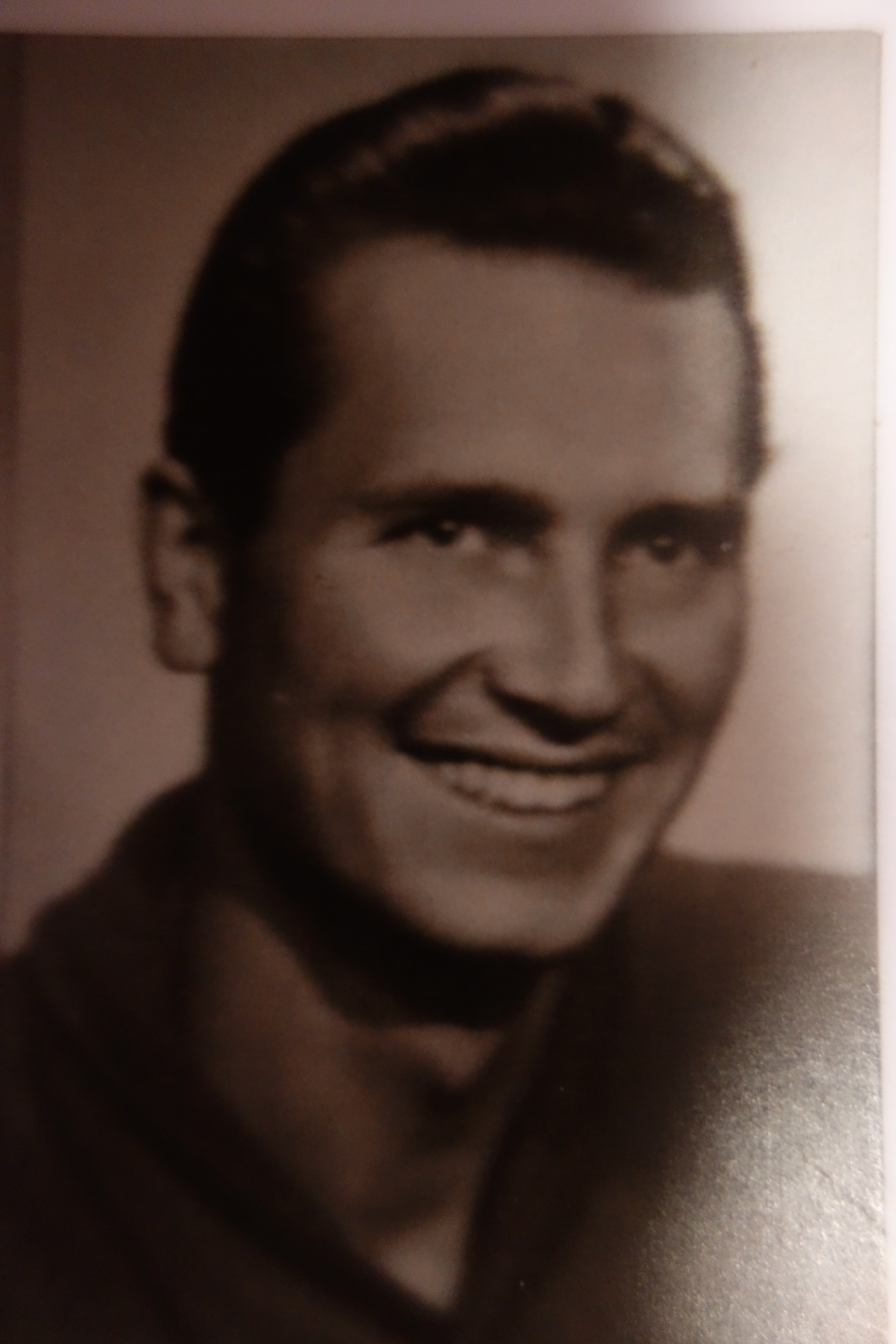
Portrait of Jiří Dadák

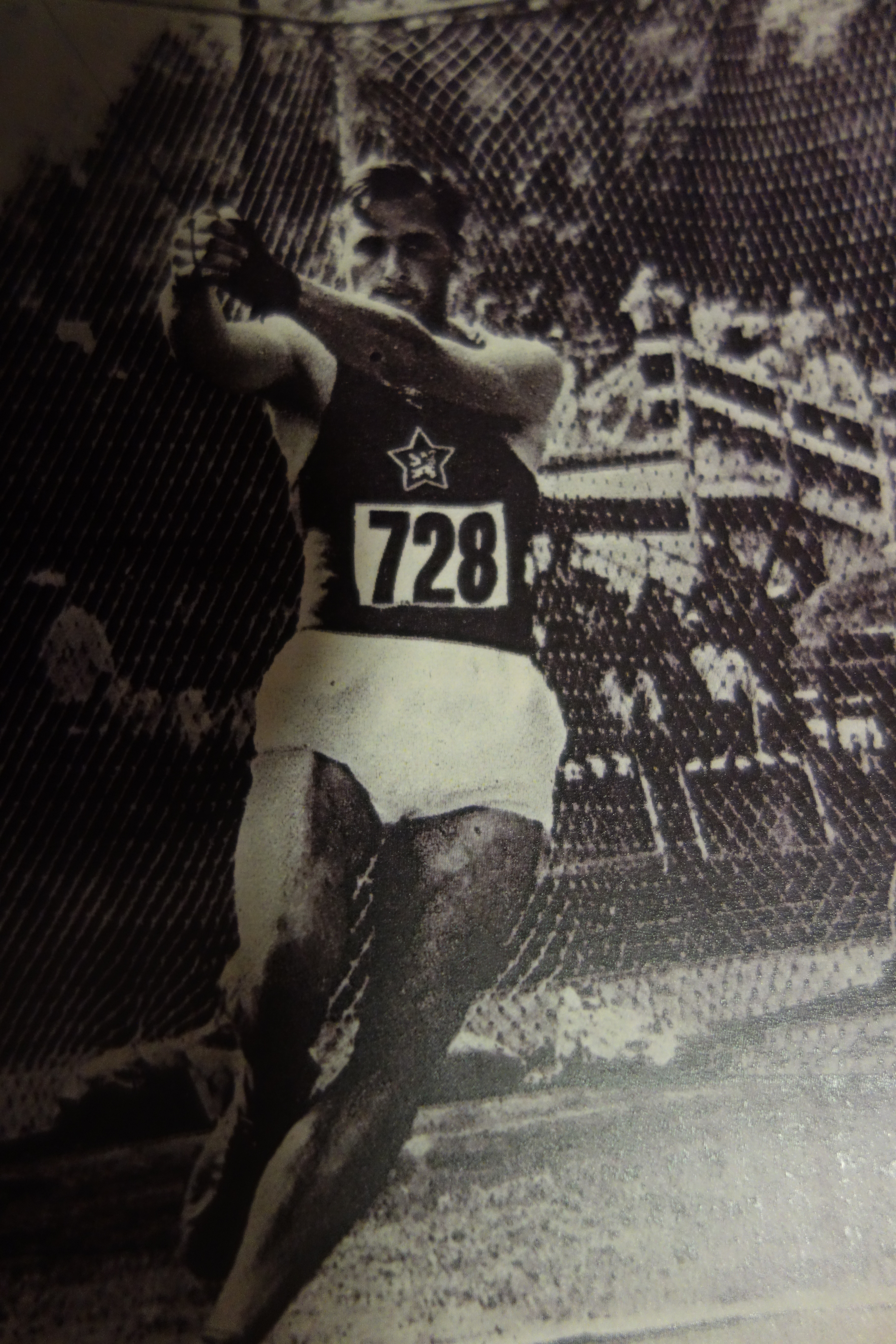
Jiří Dadák during the competition

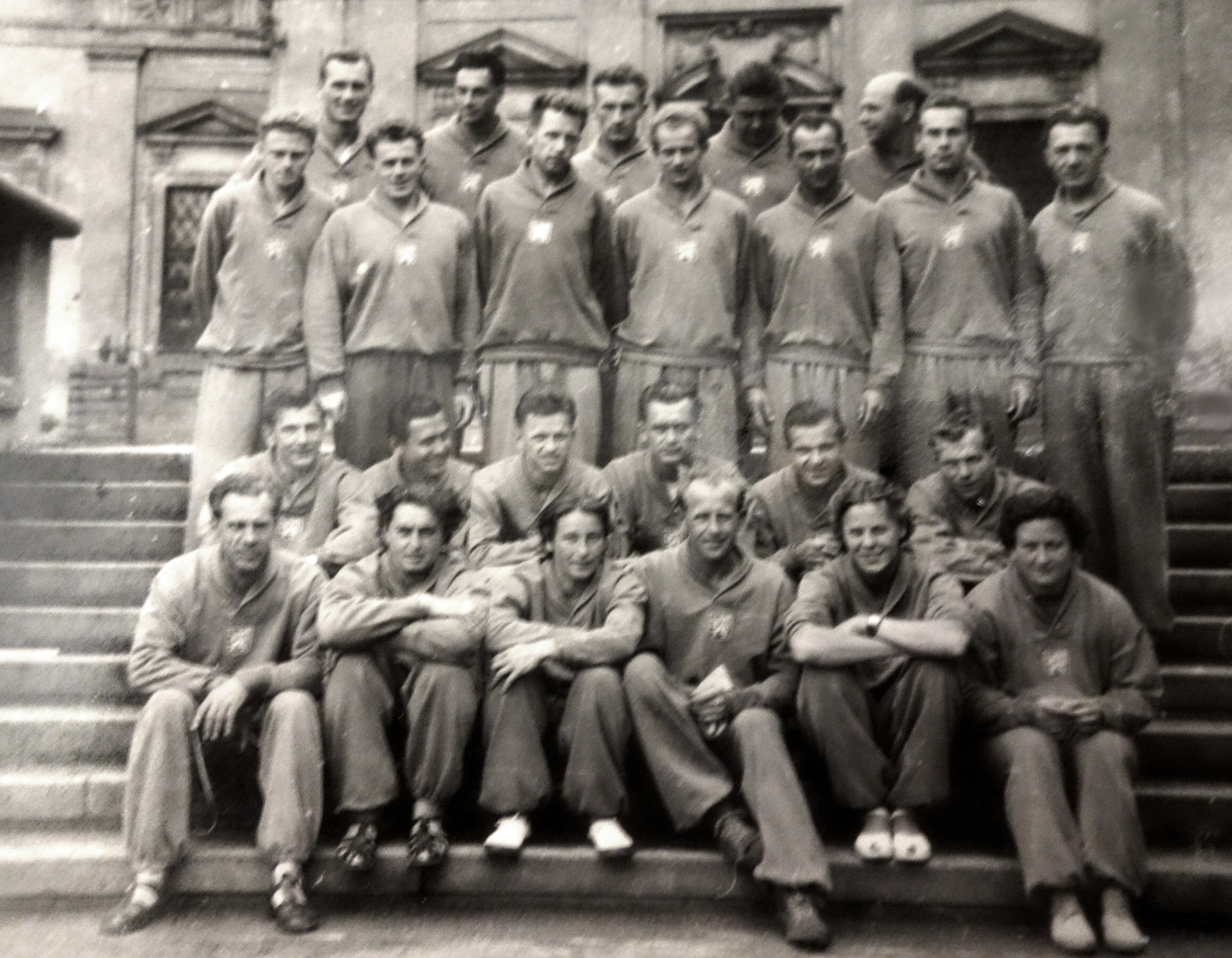
At the Summer Olympics in Helsinki
