= Reino Kuivamäki =

Finnish hammer thrower

Personal information
- Nationality: Finnish
- Born: 17 May 1918 Ilmajoki, Finland
- Died: 26 March 1982 (aged 63) Seinäjoki, Finland

Sport
- Sport: Athletics
- Event: Hammer throw

Reino Kuivamäki (17 May 1918 – 26 March 1982) was a Finnish athlete. He competed in the men's hammer throw at the 1948 Summer Olympics and the 1952 Summer Olympics.
