= Hans Houtzager =

Dutch hammer thrower

Personal information
- Born: 26 August 1910 Honselersdijk, the Netherlands
- Died: 29 December 1993 (aged 83) Beilen, the Netherlands

Sport
- Sport: Hammer throw
- Club: PSV, Eindhoven/V&L, Den Haag

Johan Frederik Marie "Hans" Houtzager (26 August 1910 – 29 December 1993) was a Dutch hammer thrower. He competed at the 1936 and 1948 Summer Olympics and finished in 12th place in 1948. Two years earlier he was fifth at the 1946 European Athletics Championships.

Houtzager won the British AAA Championships title in the hammer throw event at the 1946 AAA Championships.

Houtzager retired from competitions in 1952, shortly after winning his last national title. His son Hans Houtzager Jr. also competed in the hammer throw and became the national champion in 1969.
