= Pierre Legrain =

French hammer thrower

Personal information
- Nationality: French
- Born: 18 February 1920 La Neuville, France
- Died: 20 June 2005 (aged 85) Thumeries, France

Sport
- Sport: Athletics
- Event: Hammer throw

Pierre Legrain (18 February 1920 – 20 June 2005) was a French athlete. He competed in the men's hammer throw at the 1948 Summer Olympics and the 1952 Summer Olympics.

== Athletic career ==
He was French champion in the hammer throw four times (1948, 1949, 1951, 1953) and represented France internationally on 43 occasions (from 1948 to 1959). He competed at the London Olympic Games in 1948 and at the Helsinki Olympic Games in 1952.

After his athletic career, he became a renowned coach at Étoile d'Oignies (where he created the athletics section) and in Douai. He was notably the coach of Guy Drut.
