= Teseo Taddia =

Italian hammer thrower (1920–1982)

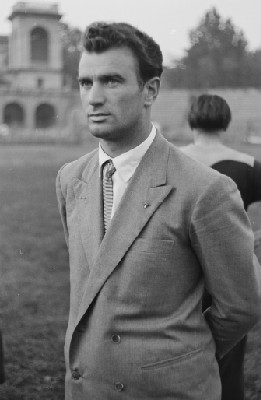
- Teseo Taddia in 1950

Personal information
- Nationality: Italian
- Born: Bondeno, Italy
- Died: 23 December 1982 (aged 62) Milan, Italy
- Height: 1.84 m (6 ft 1/2 in)
- Weight: 92 kg (203 lb)

Sport
- Sport: Athletics
- Event: Hammer throw
- Club: G.S. Pirelli Milano

Achievements and titles
- Personal best: Hammer throw: 59.17 m (1950)
Medal record
Men's athletics
Representing Italy
European Championships
Silver medal – second place	1950 Brussels	Hammer throw
Mediterranean Games
Gold medal – first place	1951 Alexandria	Hammer throw
Gold medal – first place	1955 Barcelona	Hammer throw

Teseo Taddia (20 April 1920 – 23 December 1982) was a hammer thrower from Italy. He won three medals, at senior level, at the International athletics competitions.

== Biography ==
He twice competed for his native country at the Summer Olympics: in 1948 and 1952. Born in Bondeno, Ferrara he set his personal best (59.17 metres) in the men's hammer throw event in 1950.

He won fourteen hammer throw national championships at senior level in 1939, 1941, 1942, 1943, 1945, 1947, 1948, 1949, 1950, 1951, 1953, 1954, 1955 and 1956.

Taddia won the British AAA Championships title in the hammer throw event at the 1951 AAA Championships.

== See also ==
- Italian all-time top lists - Hammer throw
