= Ewan Douglas =

British hammer thrower

Personal information
- Nationality: British (Scottish)
- Born: 14 November 1922 Edinburgh, Scotland
- Died: 29 December 1999 (aged 77) Spain
- Height: 193 cm (6 ft 4 in)
- Weight: 95 kg (209 lb)

Sport
- Sport: Athletics
- Event: Hammer throw
- Club: Royal Air Force; Field Events Club, Edinburgh

Rugby union career
- Position: Wing
Amateur team(s)
Years	Team	Apps	(Points)
- Edinburgh University
–	RAF Rugby		
Provincial / State sides
Years	Team	Apps	(Points)
1942-44	East of Scotland District		
International career
Years	Team	Apps	(Points)
1942	Scotland	1	(0)

Ewan Campbell Kennedy Douglas (14 November 1922 – 29 December 1999) was a Scotland international rugby union player. He was also a Scottish athlete. He competed in the men's hammer throw at the 1948 Summer Olympics and the 1952 Summer Olympics.

== Rugby Union career ==
=== Amateur career ===
He played for Edinburgh University.

During the second world war he played for the RAF.

=== Provincial career ===
He played for East of Scotland District in 1942. He played for the East side in 1944 against the Army side, scoring two tries in a 19 - 15 win for the District side.

=== International career ===
Douglas played in the 21 March 1942 Services International match against England for Scotland. As a Services international, Douglas was finally given a retrospective cap in 2023.

He played as a wing, centre and full back for Scotland.

== Athletics career ==
He competed in the 1948 Summer Olympics and the 1952 Summer Olympics in hammer throwing.

He threw a British record of 179 feet, 10 inches in the hammer-throwing. He was retrospectively awarded the Crabbie Cup in 1951 for his performance.

He representated the Scottish team at the 1954 British Empire and Commonwealth Games in Vancouver, Canada, where he participated in the hammer throw and discus throw events. He represented Great Britain against Germany in 1955.

He represented the Scottish Empire and Commonwealth Games team again at the 1958 British Empire Games in Cardiff, Wales, participating in one event, the hammer throw.
