= Modern pentathlon at the 1980 Summer Olympics – Men's individual =

Men's individual modern pentathlon at the Games of the XXII Olympiad
- Dates: July 20–24
- Competitors: 43 from 17 nations

Medalists
1st place, gold medalist(s)		Anatoly Starostin	Soviet Union
2nd place, silver medalist(s)		Tamás Szombathelyi	Hungary
3rd place, bronze medalist(s)		Pavel Lednev	Soviet Union

The modern pentathlon at the 1980 Summer Olympics was represented by two events (both for men): Individual competition and Team competition. As usual in Olympic modern pentathlon one competition was held and each competitor's score was included to the Individual competition event results table and was also added to his teammates' scores to be included to the Team competition event results table. This competition consisted of 5 disciplines which were held in 4 venues:

1. Equestrian held on July 20 at the Trade Unions Equestrian Centre situated in the Bitsa forest park (southern part of Moscow)
2. Fencing held on July 21 at the Sports Palace of the Central Sports Club of the Army (south-western part of Moscow)
3. Shooting held on July 22 at the Dynamo Shooting Range in Mytishchi (south-eastern part of Moscow)
4. Swimming held on July 23 at the Swimming Pool of the Olympiski Sports Complex (central part of Moscow)
5. Cross-country held on July 24 at the Trade Unions Equestrian Centre

== Results ==
Rank	Athlete	Rid.	Fen.	Sho.	Swi.	Run.	Score
1st place, gold medalist(s)	Anatoly Starostin (URS)	1068	1000	1110	1216	1174	5568
2nd place, silver medalist(s)	Tamás Szombathelyi (HUN)	1100	1026	1088	1144	1144	5502
3rd place, bronze medalist(s)	Pavel Lednev (URS)	1026	1026	1022	1104	1204	5382
4	Svante Rasmuson (SWE)	936	922	1000	1332	1183	5373
5	Tibor Maracskó (HUN)	980	964	956	1208	1171	5279
6	Janusz Pyciak-Peciak (POL)	1070	844	978	1172	1204	5268
7	Lennart Pettersson (SWE)	1050	922	1088	1156	1027	5243
8	Milan Kadlec (TCH)	1084	792	1088	1088	1177	5229
9	George Horvath (SWE)	1036	870	1132	1152	1039	5229
10	Heikki Hulkkonen (FIN)	980	1000	1066	1100	1081	5227
11	Jan Olesiński (POL)	1038	818	978	1160	1225	5219
12	Paul Four (FRA)	1018	922	1066	1244	946	5196
13	Ivar Sisniega (MEX)	1058	766	912	1348	1102	5186
14	Evegeny Lipeev (URS)	1100	870	824	1232	1150	5176
15	Robert Nightingale (GBR)	950	766	1000	1212	1240	5168
16	Jan Bártů (TCH)	970	766	1066	1260	1096	5158
17	Pier Paolo Cristofori (ITA)	1050	818	934	1120	1234	5156
18	Marek Bajan (POL)	1100	844	890	1244	1069	5147
19	László Horváth (HUN)	1008	1052	956	1076	1039	5131
20	Joël Bouzou (FRA)	962	922	1044	1080	1099	5107
21	Peter Whiteside (GBR)	1010	766	1000	1228	1081	5085
22	Dumitru Spîrlea (ROU)	1100	844	912	1184	1018	5058
23	Alain Cortes (FRA)	1090	756	978	1140	1078	5042
24	Jussi Pelli (FIN)	980	740	1088	1116	1108	5032
25	Federico Galera (ESP)	1008	844	1022	1100	1027	5001
26	Bohumil Starnovský (TCH)	1100	740	890	1156	1066	4952
27	Gyula Laszlo Câllovits (ROU)	954	766	1022	1088	1105	4935
28	Simeon Monev (BUL)	1010	636	1088	1148	1033	4915
29	José Serrano (ESP)	1010	714	890	1252	1021	4887
30	Nikolai Nikolov (BUL)	1004	740	1066	1028	994	4832
31	Pekka Santanen (FIN)	891	740	978	1168	1051	4828
32	Manuel Montesinos (ESP)	1076	818	890	1120	907	4811
33	Nigel Clark (GBR)	986	714	824	1141	1141	4809
34	Borislav Batikov (BUL)	978	740	934	1164	982	4798
35	Alexander Topay (AUT)	1070	662	1000	1112	940	4784
36	Jens Lohmann (MEX)	1054	662	978	1152	910	4747
37	Robert Barrie (AUS)	1062	610	846	1124	1054	4696
38	Helmut Wieser (AUT)	1090	662	978	996	856	4582
39	Jerome Hartigan (IRL)	1070	506	934	912	1135	4557
40	Brian Newth (NZL)	1018	532	846	1048	1042	4486
41	Cezar Mihai Râducanu (ROU)	1010	652	516	1216	1003	4397
42	Sackville Currie (IRL)	870	558	780	1052	1117	4377
43	Mark Hartigan (IRL)	884	558	890	936	1093	4361
