= Modern pentathlon at the 1980 Summer Olympics – Men's team =

Men's team modern pentathlon at the Games of the XXII Olympiad
- Dates: July 20–24
- Competitors: 36 from 12 nations

Medalists
1st place, gold medalist(s)		Pavel Lednev; Yevgeny Lipeyev; Anatoly Starostin	Soviet Union
2nd place, silver medalist(s)		László Horváth; Tibor Maracskó; Tamás Szombathelyi	Hungary
3rd place, bronze medalist(s)		George Horvath; Lennart Pettersson; Svante Rasmuson	Sweden

The modern pentathlon at the 1980 Summer Olympics was represented by two events (both for men): Individual competition and Team competition. As usual in Olympic modern pentathlon one competition was held and each competitor's score was included to the Individual competition event results table and was also added to his teammates' scores to be included to the Team competition event results table. This competition consisted of 5 disciplines which were held in 4 venues:

1. Equestrian held on July 20 at the Trade Unions Equestrian Centre situated in the Bitsa forest park (southern part of Moscow)
2. Fencing held on July 21 at the Sports Palace of the Central Sports Club of the Army (south-western part of Moscow)
3. Shooting held on July 22 at the Dynamo Shooting Range in Mytishchi (south-eastern part of Moscow)
4. Swimming held on July 23 at the Swimming Pool of the Olympiski Sports Complex (central part of Moscow)
5. Cross-country held on July 24 at the Trade Unions Equestrian Centre

== Results ==
Rank	Nation	Athletes	Rid.	Fen.	Swi.	Sho.	Run.	Score	Team Score
1st place, gold medalist(s)	Soviet Union	Anatoly Starostin	1068	1000	1110	1216	1174	5568	16126
1st place, gold medalist(s)	Soviet Union	Pavel Lednev	1026	1026	1022	1104	1204	5382	16126
1st place, gold medalist(s)	Soviet Union	Yevgeny Lipeyev	1100	870	824	1232	1150	5176	16126
2nd place, silver medalist(s)	Hungary	Tamás Szombathelyi	1100	1026	1088	1144	1144	5502	15912
2nd place, silver medalist(s)	Hungary	Tibor Maracskó	980	964	956	1208	1171	5279	15912
2nd place, silver medalist(s)	Hungary	László Horváth	1008	1052	956	1076	1039	5131	15912
3rd place, bronze medalist(s)	Sweden	Svante Rasmuson	936	922	1000	1332	1183	5373	15845
3rd place, bronze medalist(s)	Sweden	Lennart Pettersson	1050	922	1088	1156	1027	5243	15845
3rd place, bronze medalist(s)	Sweden	George Horvath	1036	870	1132	1152	1039	5229	15845
4	Poland	Janusz Pyciak-Peciak	1070	844	978	1172	1204	5268	15634
4	Poland	Jan Olesiński	1038	818	978	1160	1225	5219	15634
4	Poland	Marek Bajan	1100	844	890	1244	1069	5147	15634
5	France	Paul Four	1018	922	1066	1244	946	5196	15345
5	France	Joël Bouzou	962	922	1044	1080	1099	5107	15345
5	France	Alain Cortes	1090	756	978	1140	1078	5042	15345
6	Czechoslovakia	Milan Kadlec	1084	792	1088	1088	1177	5229	15339
6	Czechoslovakia	Jan Bártů	970	766	1066	1260	1096	5158	15339
6	Czechoslovakia	Bohumil Starnovský	1100	740	890	1156	1066	4952	15339
7	Finland	Heikki Hulkkonen	980	1000	1066	1100	1081	5227	15087
7	Finland	Jussi Pelli	980	740	1088	1116	1108	5032	15087
7	Finland	Pekka Santanen	891	740	978	1168	1051	4828	15087
8	Great Britain	Robert Nightingale	950	766	1000	1212	1240	5168	15062
8	Great Britain	Peter Whiteside	1010	766	1000	1228	1081	5085	15062
8	Great Britain	Nigel Clark	986	714	824	1141	1141	4809	15062
9	Spain	Federico Galera	1008	844	1022	1100	1027	5001	14699
9	Spain	José Serrano	1010	714	890	1252	1021	4887	14699
9	Spain	Manuel Montesinos	1076	818	890	1120	907	4811	14699
10	Bulgaria	Simeon Monev	1010	636	1088	1148	1033	4915	14545
10	Bulgaria	Nikolai Nikolov	1004	740	1066	1028	994	4832	14545
10	Bulgaria	Borislav Batikov	978	740	934	1164	982	4798	14545
11	Romania	Dumitru Spîrlea	1100	844	912	1184	1018	5058	14390
11	Romania	Gyula Laszlo Câllovits	954	766	1022	1088	1105	4935	14390
11	Romania	Cezar Mihai Râducanu	1010	652	516	1216	1003	4397	14390
12	Ireland	Jerome Hartigan	1070	506	934	912	1135	4557	13295
12	Ireland	Sackville Currie	870	558	780	1052	1117	4377	13295
12	Ireland	Mark Hartigan	884	558	890	936	1093	4361	13295
