= Ireland at the 1980 Summer Olympics =

- Flag of the Olympic Movement
- IOC code: IRL
- NOC: Olympic Federation of Ireland
- Website: olympics.ie

in Moscow
- Competitors: 47 (44 men and 3 women) in 11 sports
- Flag bearer: Ken Ryan
- Medals Ranked 31st: Gold 0 Silver 1 Bronze 1 Total 2

Summer Olympics appearances (overview)
- 1924; 1928; 1932; 1936; 1948; 1952; 1956; 1960; 1964; 1968; 1972; 1976; 1980; 1984; 1988; 1992; 1996; 2000; 2004; 2008; 2012; 2016; 2020; 2024

Other related appearances
- Great Britain (1896–1920)

Ireland competed at the 1980 Summer Olympics in Moscow, USSR. 47 competitors, 44 men and 3 women, took part in 38 events in 11 sports. In partial support of the American-led boycott of the 1980 Summer Olympics, Ireland competed under the Olympic Flag instead of its national flag.

== Medalists ==
Medal	Name	Sport	Event
Silver	David Wilkins and James Wilkinson	Sailing	Flying Dutchman class
Bronze	Hugh Russell	Boxing	Men's Flyweight

== Archery ==
In Ireland's second appearance in archery competition at the Olympics, the nation was represented by two men and one woman. The men included Ireland's only veteran from 1976, James Conroy. It was Hazel Greene, however, who posted the nation's best results.

Women's Individual Competition:

- Hazel Greene — 2229 points (→ 19th place)

Men's Individual Competition:

- William Swords — 2212 points (→ 31st place)
- James Conroy — 2058 points (→ 37th place)

== Athletics ==
Men's 1,500 metres

- Ray Flynn

- Heat — 3:42.0 (→ did not advance)

Men's 5,000 metres

- Eamonn Coghlan

- Heat — 13:45.4
- Semi Final — 13:28.8
- Final — 13:22.8 (→ 4th place)

- John Treacy

- Heat — 13:44.8
- Semi Final — 13:40.3
- Final — 13:23.7 (→ 7th place)

- Mick O'Shea

- Heat — 14:03.0 (→ did not advance)

Men's 10,000 metres

- John Treacy

- Heat — did not finish (→ did not advance)

Men's Marathon

- Dick Hooper

- Final — 2:23:53 (→ 38th place)

- Pat Hooper

- Final — 2:30:28 (→ 42nd place)

- John Treacy

- Final — did not start (→ no ranking)

Men's Hammer Throw

- Seán Egan

- Qualification — 63.94 m (→ did not advance, 16th place)

== Boxing ==
Men's Light Flyweight (– 48 kg)

- Gerard Hawkins

- First Round — Bye
- Second Round — Lost to Ismail Mustafov (Bulgaria) on points (0-5)

Men's Flyweight (– 51 kg)

- Hugh Russell → Bronze Medal

- First Round — Defeated Samir Khiniab (Iraq) on points (5-0)
- Second Round — Defeated Emmanuel Mlundwa (Tanzania) on points (5-0)
- Quarter Finals — Defeated Yo Ryon-Sik (North Korea) on points (3-2)
- Semi Finals — Lost to Petar Lesov (Bulgaria) on points (0-5)

Men's Bantamweight (– 54 kg)

- Philip Sutcliffe Snr

- First Round — Bye
- Second Round — Lost to Daniel Zaragoza (Mexico) on points (0-5)

Men's Featherweight (– 57 kg)

- Barry McGuigan

- First Round — Bye
- Second Round — Defeated Issack Mabushi (Tanzania) after referee stopped contest in third round
- Third Round — Lost to Winfred Kabunda (Zambia) on points (1-4)

Men's Lightweight (– 60 kg)

- Sean Doyle

- First Round — Defeated Nelson René Trujillo (Venezuela) after referee stopped contest in second round
- Second Round — Lost to Florian Livadaru (Romania) after referee stopped contest in first round

Men's Light-Welterweight (– 63,5 kg)

- Martin Brerton

- First Round — Lost to José Aguilar (Cuba) after referee stopped contest in first round

== Cycling ==
Three cyclists represented Ireland in 1980.

Individual road race

- Billy Kerr
- Stephen Roche
- Tony Lally

== Modern pentathlon ==
Three male pentathletes represented Ireland in 1980.

Individual Competition:

- Jerome Hartigan — 4.557 pts 39th place
- Sackville Currie — 4.377 42nd place
- Mark Hartigan — 4.361 pts, 43rd place

Team Competition:

- Hartigan, Currie, and Hartigan — 13.295pts 12th place

== Rowing ==
Men's Coxless Pairs

- Pat Gannon — 1st B Final (→ 7th)
- Willie Ryan — 1st B Final (→ 7th)

Men's Coxed Pairs

- Denis Rice — 5th B Final (→ 11th)
- Christy O'Brien — 5th B Final (→ 11th)
- Liam Williams — 5th B Final (→ 11th)

Men's Coxed Fours

- Iain Kennedy — 5th B Final (→ 11th)
- Pat McDonagh — 5th B Final (→ 11th)
- Ted Ryan — 5th B Final (→ 11th)
- Davey Gray — 5th B Final (→ 11th)
- Noel Graham — 5th B Final (→ 11th)

Women's Single Sculls

- Frances Cryan — 1st B Final (→ 7th)

== Sailing ==
- David Wilkins and James Wilkinson — Flying Dutchman class

== Swimming ==
Men

Athlete	Event	Heat		Semifinal		Final	
Athlete	Event	Time	Rank	Time	Rank	Time	Rank
David Cummins	100 m freestyle	DNS		Did not advance			
David Cummins	200 m freestyle	DNS		—N/a		Did not advance	
David Cummins	100 m backstroke	DNS		Did not advance			
David Cummins	200 m backstroke	2:12.45	22	—N/a		Did not advance	
David Cummins	100 m butterfly	58.90	26	Did not advance			
David Cummins	200 m butterfly	2:06.47	16	—N/a		Did not advance	
Kevin Williamson	200 m freestyle	1:57.37	35	—N/a		Did not advance	
Kevin Williamson	400 m freestyle	4:09.01	26	—N/a		Did not advance	
Kevin Williamson	1500 m freestyle	DNS		—N/a		Did not advance	

Women

Athlete	Event	Heat		Semifinal		Final	
Athlete	Event	Time	Rank	Time	Rank	Time	Rank
Catherine Bohan	100 m breaststroke	1:16.84	20	—N/a		Did not advance	
Catherine Bohan	200 m breaststroke	2:43.30	20	—N/a		Did not advance	
Catherine Bohan	400 m individual medley	5:21.82	15	—N/a		Did not advance	
