= 1982 European Athletics Championships – Men's hammer throw =

Men's hammer throw at the European Athletics Championships

The final of the Men's hammer throw event at the 1982 European Championships in Athens, Greece was held on September 10, 1982. The qualification round was staged a day earlier, on September 9, 1982.

== Medalists ==
Gold	Yuriy Sedykh; Soviet Union (URS)
Silver	Igor Nikulin; Soviet Union (URS)
Bronze	Sergey Litvinov; Soviet Union (URS)

== Records ==
Standing records prior to the 1982 European Athletics Championships
World Record	Sergey Litvinov (URS)	83.98 m	June 4, 1982	Moscow, Soviet Union
Championship Record	Yuriy Sedykh (URS)	77.28 m	September 2, 1978	Prague, Czechoslovakia
Broken records during the 1982 European Athletics Championships
Championship Record	Yuriy Sedykh (URS)	77.58 m	September 9, 1982	Athens, Greece
Championship Record	Sergey Litvinov (URS)	77.58 m	September 9, 1982	Athens, Greece
Championship Record	Yuriy Sedykh (URS)	81.66 m	September 10, 1982	Athens, Greece

== Qualification ==
Q = automatic qualification; q = qualified by rank; DNS = did not start; NM = no mark; WR = world record; CR = championship record; AR = area record; NR = national record; PB = personal best; SB = season best

=== Final ranking ===
Rank	Athlete	Attempts			Distance
Rank	Athlete	1	2	3	Distance
1	Sergey Litvinov (URS)				77.58 m CR
2	Yuriy Sedykh (URS)				77.58 m CR
3	Harri Huhtala (FIN)				75.86 m
4	Klaus Ploghaus (FRG)				74.32 m
5	Roland Steuk (GDR)				74.10 m
6	Igor Nikulin (URS)				74.06 m
7	Ireneusz Golda (POL)				73.92 m
8	Detlef Gerstenberg (GDR)				73.88 m
9	Mariusz Tomaszewski (POL)				73.48 m
10	Jörg Schäfer (FRG)				72.98 m
11	Giampaolo Urlando (ITA)				72.76 m
12	Juha Tiainen (FIN)				72.62 m
13	Emanuil Dyulgerov (BUL)				71.16 m
14	Tibor Tanczi (HUN)				71.04 m
15	Martin Girvan (GBR)				70.62 m
16	Orlando Bianchini (ITA)				70.06 m
17	Richard Olsen (NOR)				69.78 m
18	Jukka Olkkonen (FIN)				69.76 m
19	Christoph Sahner (FRG)				69.24 m
20	Sean Egan (IRL)				66.96 m
—	Kjell Bystedt (SWE)	X	X	X	NM

== Final ==
Rank	Athlete	Attempts						Distance	Note
Rank	Athlete	1	2	3	4	5	6	Distance	Note
1st place, gold medalist(s)	Yuri Sedykh (URS)	81.66	80.48	80.96	79.36	81.62	80.94	81.66 m	CR
2nd place, silver medalist(s)	Igor Nikulin (URS)	79.44	X	78.38	78.36	79.22	X	79.44 m	
3rd place, bronze medalist(s)	Sergey Litvinov (URS)	76.88	76.72	78.66	78.10	X	77.90	78.66 m	
4	Ireneusz Golda (POL)	76.58	73.76	75.82	74.60	74.98	76.56	76.58 m	
5	Harri Huhtala (FIN)	76.12	X	72.82	74.96	73.60	74.30	76.12 m	
6	Detlef Gerstenberg (GDR)	X	75.32	74.62	X	74.76	X	75.32 m	
7	Roland Steuk (GDR)	74.76	74.50	72.50	X	72.22	X	74.76 m	
8	Klaus Ploghaus (FRG)	X	74.52	74.52	X	71.78	X	74.52 m	
9	Jörg Schäfer (FRG)							74.08 m	
10	Mariusz Tomaszewski (POL)							73.74 m	
11	Giampaolo Urlando (ITA)							73.72 m	
12	Juha Tiainen (FIN)							72.12 m	

== Participation ==
According to an unofficial count, 21 athletes from 12 countries participated in the event.

- Bulgaria (1)
- East Germany (2)
- Finland (3)
- Hungary (1)
- Ireland (1)
- Italy (2)
- Norway (1)
- Poland (2)
- Soviet Union (3)
- Sweden (1)
- United Kingdom (1)
- West Germany (3)

== See also ==
- 1980 Men's Olympic Hammer Throw (Moscow)
- 1982 Hammer Throw Year Ranking
- 1983 Men's World Championships Hammer Throw (Helsinki)
- 1984 Men's Olympic Hammer Throw (Los Angeles)
- 1987 Men's World Championships Hammer Throw (Rome)
- 1988 Men's Olympic Hammer Throw (Seoul)
