= Judo at the 2020 Summer Olympics – Mixed team =

Judo competition

Mixed team at the Games of the XXXII Olympiad
- Venue: Nippon Budokan
- Date: 31 July 2021
- Competitors: 12 from 12 nations

Medalists
1st place, gold medalist(s)		France (FRA); Amandine Buchard; Guillaume Chaine; Sarah-Léonie Cysique; Kilian Le Blouch; Clarisse Agbegnenou; Axel Clerget; Margaux Pinot; Alexandre Iddir; Romane Dicko; Teddy Riner; Madeleine Malonga
2nd place, silver medalist(s)		Japan (JPN); Hifumi Abe; Uta Abe; Shohei Ono; Tsukasa Yoshida; Shoichiro Mukai; Chizuru Arai; Takanori Nagase; Miku Tashiro; Hisayoshi Harasawa; Shori Hamada; Aaron Wolf; Akira Sone
3rd place, bronze medalist(s)		Israel (ISR); Tohar Butbul; Timna Nelson-Levy; Baruch Shmailov; Shira Rishony; Li Kochman; Gili Sharir; Sagi Muki; Raz Hershko; Peter Paltchik; Inbar Lanir; Or Sasson
3rd place, bronze medalist(s)		Germany (GER); Sebastian Seidl; Katharina Menz; Igor Wandtke; Theresa Stoll; Dominic Ressel; Giovanna Scoccimarro; Eduard Trippel; Martyna Trajdos; Johannes Frey; Jasmin Grabowski; Karl-Richard Frey; Anna-Maria Wagner

The mixed team competition in judo at the 2020 Summer Olympics in Tokyo was held on 31 July 2021 at the Nippon Budokan.

It was the first time a team judo competition was held in the Olympics.

Team Japan is the only team to win this event at the World Judo Championships, with team France winning the last 3 silver medals.

The medals for the competition were presented by Mr. Yasuhiro Yamashita, IOC Member, Japan, Olympian, one Gold Medal; and the medalists' bouquets were presented by Marius L Vizer, IJF President; Austria.

== Results ==
=== Finals ===
Gold medal
1 Japan (JPN)	1
2 France (FRA)	4

=== Repechage ===
Repechage
Germany (GER)	4
Mongolia (MGL)	2

Bronze medal
Germany (GER)	4
Netherlands (NED)	2

Repechage
Israel (ISR)	4
3 Brazil (BRA)	2

Bronze medal
Israel (ISR)	4
4 ROC	1

=== Pool A ===
First round
Germany (GER)	4
Refugee Olympic Team (EOR)	0
Mongolia (MGL)	4
South Korea (KOR)	1

Quarter-finals
1 Japan (JPN)	4
Germany (GER)	2
4 ROC	4
Mongolia (MGL)	2

Semi-finals
1 Japan (JPN)	4
4 ROC	0

=== Pool B ===
First round
Italy (ITA)	3
Israel (ISR)	4
Netherlands (NED)	4
Uzbekistan (UZB)	3

Quarter-finals
2 France (FRA)	4
Israel (ISR)	3
3 Brazil (BRA)	2
Netherlands (NED)	4

Semi-finals
2 France (FRA)	4
Netherlands (NED)	0

== Matches ==
=== First round ===
==== Germany vs Refugee Olympic Team ====
Weight Class	Germany (GER)	Result	Refugee Olympic Team (EOR)	Score
Men +90 kg	Johannes Frey	10 (yellow card) – 00	Javad Mahjoub	1 – 0
Women –57 kg	Theresa Stoll	10 – 00	Sanda Aldass	2 – 0
Men –73 kg	Igor Wandtke	10 – 00	Ahmad Alikaj	3 – 0
Women –70 kg	Martyna Trajdos	10 – 00 (yellow card)	Muna Dahouk	4 – 0
Men -90 kg	Dominic Ressel	—	Popole Misenga	—
Women +70 kg	Jasmin Grabowski	—	Nigara Shaheen	—
Results

==== Mongolia vs South Korea ====
Weight Class	Mongolia (MGL)	Result	South Korea (KOR)	Score
Men +90 kg	Ölziibayaryn Düürenbayar	00 (yellow card) – 10	Kim Min-jong	0 – 1
Women –57 kg	Dorjsürengiin Sumiyaa	01 (yellow card) – 00	Kim Ji-su	1 – 1
Men –73 kg	Tsend-Ochiryn Tsogtbaatar	10 – 00	An Chang-rim	2 – 1
Women –70 kg	Boldyn Gankhaich	01 – 00	Kim Seong-yeon	3 – 1
Men –90 kg	Gantulgyn Altanbagana	10 – 00	Gwak Dong-han	4 – 1
Women +70 kg	Otgony Mönkhtsetseg	—	Han Mi-jin	—
Results

==== Italy vs Israel ====
Weight Class	Italy (ITA)	Result	Israel (ISR)	Score
Men +90 kg	Nicholas Mungai	00 – 10	Peter Paltchik	0 – 1
Women –57 kg	Odette Giuffrida	01 (yellow card) – 00	Timna Nelson-Levy	1 – 1
Men -73 kg	Fabio Basile	01 – 00 (yellow card)	Tohar Butbul	2 – 1
Women –70 kg	Maria Centracchio	00 – 10 (yellow card)	Gili Sharir	2 – 2
Men –90 kg	Christian Parlati	11 – 01	Li Kochman	3 – 2
Women +70 kg	Alice Bellandi	00 (yellow card) – 01	Raz Hershko	3 – 3
Women –70 kg	Maria Centracchio	00 – 10	Gili Sharir	3 – 4
Results

==== Netherlands vs Uzbekistan ====
Weight Class	Netherlands (NED)	Result	Uzbekistan (UZB)	Score
Men +90 kg	Henk Grol	00 – 10	Bekmurod Oltiboev	0 – 1
Women –57 kg	Sanne Verhagen	10 (yellow card) – 00 (yellow card)	Diyora Keldiyorova	1 – 1
Men –73 kg	Tornike Tsjakadoea	00 – 10 (yellow card)	Khikmatillokh Turaev	1 – 2
Women –70 kg	Sanne van Dijke	00 (yellow card) – 10	Gulnoza Matniyazova	1 – 3
Men –90 kg	Noël van 't End	10 – 00 (yellow card)	Davlat Bobonov	2 – 3
Women +70 kg	Guusje Steenhuis	10 – 00 (yellow card)	Farangiz Khojieva	3 – 3
Men +90 kg	Henk Grol	10 – 00	Bekmurod Oltiboev	4 – 3
Results

=== Quarterfinals ===
==== Japan vs Germany ====
Weight Class	Japan (JPN)	Result	Germany (GER)	Score
Women -57 kg	Uta Abe	00 – 10 (yellow card)	Theresa Stoll	0 – 1
Men -73 kg	Shohei Ono	00 – 01	Igor Wandtke	0 – 2
Women -70 kg	Chizuru Arai	10 – 00	Giovanna Scoccimarro	1 – 2
Men -90 kg	Shoichiro Mukai	01 (yellow card) – 00 (yellow card)	Eduard Trippel	2 – 2
Women +70 kg	Akira Sone	10 – 00 (yellow card)	Jasmin Grabowski	3 – 2
Men +90 kg	Aaron Wolf	01 – 00 (yellow card)	Johannes Frey	4 – 2
Results

==== ROC vs Mongolia ====
Weight Class	ROC	Result	Mongolia (MGL)	Score
Women -57 kg	Daria Mezhetskaia	01 (yellow card) – 00	Dorjsürengiin Sumiya	1 – 0
Men -73 kg	Musa Mogushkov	00 (yellow card) – 01	Tsend-Ochiryn Tsogtbaatar	1 – 1
Women -70 kg	Madina Taimazova	10 – 00	Boldyn Gankhaich	2 – 1
Men -90 kg	Mikhail Igolnikov	01 – 10 (yellow card)	Saeid Mollaei	2 – 2
Women +70 kg	Aleksandra Babintseva	10 – 00 (yellow card)	Otgony Mönkhtsetseg	3 – 2
Men +90 kg	Tamerlan Bashaev	01 (yellow card) – 00	Ölziibayaryn Düürenbayar	4 – 2
Results

==== France vs Israel ====
Weight Class	France (FRA)	Result	Israel (ISR)	Score
Women -57 kg	Sarah-Léonie Cysique	01 – 11	Timna Nelson-Levy	0 – 1
Men -73 kg	Guillaume Chaine	01 (yellow card) – 00	Tohar Butbul	1 – 1
Women -70 kg	Margaux Pinot	00 – 01	Gili Sharir	1 – 2
Men -90 kg	Axel Clerget	00 – 10	Li Kochman	1 – 3
Women +70 kg	Romane Dicko	10 – 00	Raz Hershko	2 – 3
Men +90 kg	Teddy Riner	10 – 00 (yellow card)	Or Sasson	3 – 3
Women -70 kg	Margaux Pinot	10 – 00	Gili Sharir	4 – 3
Results

==== Brazil vs Netherlands ====
Weight Class	Brazil (BRA)	Result	Netherlands (NED)	Score
Women -57 kg	Larissa Pimenta	00 – 10	Sanne Verhagen	0 – 1
Men -73 kg	Daniel Cargnin	01 (yellow card) – 00	Tornike Tsjakadoea	1 – 1
Women -70 kg	Maria Portela	00 – 10	Sanne van Dijke	1 – 2
Men -90 kg	Rafael Macedo	00 – 01 (yellow card)	Noël van 't End	1 – 3
Women +70 kg	Mayra Aguiar	10 – 00	Guusje Steenhuis	2 – 3
Men +90 kg	Rafael Silva	00 – 10 (yellow card)	Henk Grol	2 – 4
Results

=== Repechages ===
==== Germany vs Mongolia ====
Weight Class	Germany (GER)	Result	Mongolia (MGL)	Score
Men -73 kg	Igor Wandtke	00 – 01 (yellow card)	Tsend-Ochiryn Tsogtbaatar	0 – 1
Women -70 kg	Giovanna Scoccimarro	10 – 00	Boldyn Gankhaich	1 – 1
Men -90 kg	Eduard Trippel	00 – 01	Saeid Mollaei	1 – 2
Women +70 kg	Jasmin Grabowski	10 – 00	Otgony Mönkhtsetseg	2 – 2
Men +90 kg	Johannes Frey	10 (yellow card) – 00 (yellow card)	Ölziibayaryn Düürenbayar	3 – 2
Women -57 kg	Theresa Stoll	10 – 00	Dorjsürengiin Sumiya	4 – 2
Results

==== Israel vs Brazil ====
Weight Class	Israel (ISR)	Result	Brazil (BRA)	Score
Men -73 kg	Tohar Butbul	10 – 00	Eduardo Barbosa	1 – 0
Women -70 kg	Gili Sharir	00 (yellow card) – 10 (yellow card)	Maria Portela	1 – 1
Men -90 kg	Li Kochman	10 – 00	Eduardo Yudy Santos	2 – 1
Women +70 kg	Raz Hershko	00 (yellow card) – 10	Mayra Aguiar	2 – 2
Men +90 kg	Peter Paltchik	10 – 00	Rafael Buzacarini	3 – 2
Women -57 kg	Timna Nelson-Levy	10 – 00	Larissa Pimenta	4 – 2
Results

=== Semifinals ===
==== Japan vs ROC ====
Weight Class	Japan (JPN)	Result	ROC	Score
Men -73 kg	Shohei Ono	10 – 00	Musa Mogushkov	1 – 0
Women -70 kg	Chizuru Arai	10 (yellow card) – 00 (yellow card)	Madina Taimazova	2 – 0
Men -90 kg	Shoichiro Mukai	10 – 00	Mikhail Igolnikov	3 – 0
Women +70 kg	Akira Sone	10 – 00	Aleksandra Babintseva	4 – 0
Men +90 kg	Aaron Wolf	—	Tamerlan Bashaev	—
Women -57 kg	Tsukasa Yoshida	—	Daria Mezhetskaia	—
Results

==== France vs Netherlands ====
Weight Class	France (FRA)	Result	Netherlands (NED)	Score
Men -73 kg	Guillaume Chaine	10 – 00	Tornike Tsjakadoea	1 – 0
Women -70 kg	Clarisse Agbegnenou	01 (yellow card) – 00 (yellow card)	Sanne van Dijke	2 – 0
Men -90 kg	Axel Clerget	01 – 00	Noël van 't End	3 – 0
Women +70 kg	Romane Dicko	01 – 00 (yellow card)	Guusje Steenhuis	4 – 0
Men +90 kg	Teddy Riner	—	Michael Korrel	—
Women -57 kg	Sarah-Léonie Cysique	—	Sanne Verhagen	—
Results

=== Bronze medal matches ===
==== Germany vs Netherlands ====
Weight Class	Germany (GER)	Result	Netherlands (NED)	Score
Women -70 kg	Giovanna Scoccimarro	00 – 10 (yellow card)	Sanne van Dijke	0 – 1
Men -90 kg	Dominic Ressel	10 – 00	Noël van 't End	1 – 1
Women +70 kg	Anna-Maria Wagner	01 – 00 (yellow card)	Guusje Steenhuis	2 – 1
Men +90 kg	Karl-Richard Frey	00 – 10 (yellow card)	Henk Grol	2 – 2
Women -57 kg	Theresa Stoll	10 – 01	Sanne Verhagen	3 – 2
Men -73 kg	Sebastian Seidl	10 – 00	Tornike Tsjakadoea	4 – 2
Results

==== Israel vs ROC ====
Weight Class	Israel (ISR)	Result	ROC	Score
Women -70 kg	Gili Sharir	00 – 01 (yellow card)	Madina Taimazova	0 – 1
Men -90 kg	Sagi Muki	10 – 00 (yellow card)	Mikhail Igolnikov	1 – 1
Women +70 kg	Raz Hershko	10 – 00	Aleksandra Babintseva	2 – 1
Men +90 kg	Peter Paltchik	01 (yellow card) – 00	Tamerlan Bashaev	3 – 1
Women -57 kg	Timna Nelson-Levy	10 (yellow card) – 01 (yellow card)	Daria Mezhetskaia	4 – 1
Men -73 kg	Tohar Butbul	—	Musa Mogushkov	—
Results

=== Gold medal match ===
==== Japan vs France ====
Weight Class	Japan (JPN)	Result	France (FRA)	Score
Women -70 kg	Chizuru Arai	00 (yellow card) – 10 (yellow card)	Clarisse Agbegnenou	0 – 1
Men -90 kg	Shoichiro Mukai	00 – 10	Axel Clerget	0 – 2
Women +70 kg	Akira Sone	10 (yellow card) – 00	Romane Dicko	1 – 2
Men +90 kg	Aaron Wolf	00 – 01	Teddy Riner	1 – 3
Women -57 kg	Tsukasa Yoshida	00 – 01 (yellow card)	Sarah-Léonie Cysique	1 – 4
Men -73 kg	Shohei Ono	—	Guillaume Chaine	—
Results

== Teams ==
=== Men ===
pos. Judoka (#)
	Lower third				Upper third			#
NOC	–60 kg	–66 kg	–73 kg	–81 kg	–90 kg	–100 kg	+100 kg	
Japan	(gold) . Naohisa Takato (2)	(gold) . Hifumi Abe (4)	(gold) . Shohei Ono (11)	(gold) . Takanori Nagase (13)	R16. Shoichiro Mukai (10)	(gold) . Aaron Wolf (5)	5. Hisayoshi Harasawa (2)	7
Brazil	R16. Eric Takabatake (10)	(bronze) . Daniel Cargnin (10)	1R. Eduardo Barbosa (25)	1R. Eduardo Yudy Santos (19)	1R. Rafael Macedo (17)	1R. Rafael Buzacarini (15)	7. Rafael Silva (5)	7
France	(bronze) . Luka Mkheidze (14)	R16. Kilian Le Blouch (16)	R32. Guillaume Chaine (20)	—	R16. Axel Clerget (15)	1R. Alexandre Iddir (10)	(bronze) . Teddy Riner (10)	6
Germany	R16. Moritz Plafky (19)	1R. Sebastian Seidl (19)	R32. Igor Wandtke (17)	5. Dominic Ressel (10)	(silver) . Eduard Trippel (13)	7. Karl-Richard Frey (17)	1R. Johannes Frey (16)	7
Israel	—	5. Baruch Shmailov (6)	7. Tohar Butbul (6)	R16. Sagi Muki (2)	R16. Li Kochman (21)	7. Peter Paltchik (4)	R16. Or Sasson (8)	6
Italy	—	5. Manuel Lombardo (1)	R32. Fabio Basile (12)	R16. Christian Parlati (12)	R32. Nicholas Mungai (20)	—	—	4
Mongolia	1R. Amartuvshin Dashdavaa (15)	7. Baskhuu Yondonperenlei (5)	(bronze) . Tsogtbaatar Tsend-Ochir (5)	(silver) . Saeid Mollaei (6)	R32. Altanbagana Gantulga (16)	R16. Lkhagvasürengiin Otgonbaatar (13)	1R. Duurenbayar Ulziibayar (18)	7
Netherlands	5. Tornike Tsjakadoea (9)	—	—	R16. Frank de Wit (5)	7. Noël van 't End (2)	R16. Michael Korrel (3)	R16. Henk Grol (6)	5
South Korea	5. Kim Won-jin (6)	(bronze) . An Baul (2)	(bronze) . An Changrim (3)	R16. Lee Sung-ho (21)	R16. Gwak Dong-han (14)	(silver) . Cho Gu-ham (6)	R16. Kim Min-jong (9)	7
Uzbekistan	R16. Sharafuddin Lutfillaev (5)	1R. Sardor Nurillaev (8)	R16. Khikmatillokh Turaev (9)	7. Sharofiddin Boltaboev (7)	(bronze) . Davlat Bobonov (5)	R16. Mukhammadkarim Khurramov (12)	7. Bekmurod Oltiboev (15)	7
Refugee Olympic Team	—	—	1R. Ahmad Alikaj (34)	—	R32. Popole Misenga (33)	—	R16. Javad Mahjoub (22)	3
ROC	R16. Robert Mshvidobadze (1)	R16. Yakub Shamilov (9)	R32. Musa Mogushkov (13)	7. Alan Khubetsov (8)	5. Mikhail Igolnikov (8)	(bronze) . Niyaz Ilyasov (7)	(bronze) . Tamerlan Bashaev (1)	7
Total teams: 12	9	10	11	10	12	10	11	73
References								
			Middle third					

=== Women ===
pos. Judoka (#)
	Lower third				Upper third			#
NOC	–48 kg	–52 kg	–57 kg	–63 kg	–70 kg	–78 kg	+78 kg	
Japan	(silver) . Funa Tonaki (3)	(gold) . Uta Abe (2)	(bronze) . Tsukasa Yoshida (2)	R16. Miku Tashiro (3)	(gold) . Chizuru Arai (3)	(gold) . Shori Hamada (2)	(gold) . Akira Sone (3)	7
Brazil	R16. Gabriela Chibana (19)	R16. Larissa Pimenta (11)	—	7. Ketleyn Quadros (5)	R16. Maria Portela (7)	(bronze) . Mayra Aguiar (6)	7. Maria Suelen Altheman (4)	6
France	1R. Shirine Boukli (9)	(silver) . Amandine Buchard (1)	(silver) . Sarah-Léonie Cysique (4)	(gold) . Clarisse Agbegnenou (1)	R16. Margaux Pinot (2)	(silver) . Madeleine Malonga (1)	(bronze) . Romane Dicko (5)	7
Germany	1R. Katharina Menz (15)	—	R16. Theresa Stoll (5)	1R. Martyna Trajdos (6)	5. Giovanna Scoccimarro (6)	(bronze) . Anna-Maria Wagner (3)	1R. Jasmin Grabowski (19)	6
Israel	5. Shira Rishony (12)	R16. Gili Cohen (10)	7. Timna Nelson-Levy (7)	1R. Gili Sharir (18)	—	R16. Inbar Lanir (18)	R16. Raz Hershko (16)	6
Italy	1R. Francesca Milani (14)	(bronze) . Odette Giuffrida (3)	—	(bronze) . Maria Centracchio (19)	7. Alice Bellandi (21)	—	—	4
Mongolia	(bronze) . Urantsetseg Munkhbat (4)	R16. Lkhagvasürengiin Sosorbaram (13)	1R. Sumiya Dorjsuren (10)	R16. Gankhaich Bold (15)	—	1R. Munkhtsetseg Otgon (23)	—	5
Netherlands	—	—	R16. Sanne Verhagen (21)	5. Juul Franssen (8)	(bronze) . Sanne van Dijke (1)	7. Guusje Steenhuis (4)	1R. Tessie Savelkouls (14)	5
South Korea	1R. Kang Yu-jeong (18)	7. Park Da-sol (17)	R16. Kim Ji-su (16)	1R. Han Hee-ju (20)	R16. Kim Seong-yeon (20)	5. Yoon Hyun-ji (16)	7. Han Mi-jin (15)	7
Uzbekistan	—	1R. Diyora Keldiyorova (9)	—	1R. Farangiz Khojieva (29)	R16. Gulnoza Matniyazova (17)	—	—	3
Refugee Olympic Team	—	—	1R. Sanda Aldass (25)	1R. Muna Dahouk (30)	1R. Nigara Shaheen (28)	—	—	3
ROC	R16. Irina Dolgova (8)	R16. Natalia Kuziutina (8)	1R. Daria Mezhetskaia (13)	1R. Daria Davydova (10)	(bronze) . Madina Taimazova (9)	7. Aleksandra Babintseva (13)	—	6
Total teams: 12	9	9	9	12	10	9	7	65
References								
			Middle third					
