= Ahmad Alikaj =

Syrian judoka

Ahmad Alikaj (born 5 June 1991) is a Syrian judoka who competes in the under-73 kg category.

Alikaj is now living and training in Germany, after having moved from Syria to Germany as a refugee in 2015. He was included in the IJF Refugee Team at the 2019 Budapest Grand Prix, and participated in the 2019 World Championships in Tokyo. He released a joint statement alongside fellow Syrian judokas Sanda Aldass and Muna Dahouk after being selected for the IOC Refugee Olympic Team [EOR] for the 2020 Summer Games in Tokyo, where he lost in the first round to Tajikistan's Somon Makhmadbekov. "We have been dreaming of that for years and today we are living our dream. We feel that we have a great responsibility. We will represent our sport, judo, but also the entire refugee community. We are so proud. We hope that millions of refugees across the globe will want to overcome their difficulties, based on what we have achieved."
