= OLY =

Post-nominal letters for Olympians

OLY (/ˌoʊɛlˈwaɪ/ OH-el-WY) are post-nominal letters granted by the World Olympians Association (WOA) to registered athletes who have participated in the Olympic Games. The initiative was launched in 2017, and in 2022, post-nominal title PLY was introduced for Paralympic participants.

== Overview ==
In November 2017 at the 8th International Olympic Committee (IOC) International Athletes' Forum, the World Olympians Association, with the support of the IOC Athletes' Commission, announced the OLY post-nominal letters initiative. The initiative allows Olympians to use the OLY lettering on any official documentation after their name. In addition to the letters, athletes will receive a World Olympians Association certificate of their achievements when they apply for the post-nominals. The initiative is open to all athletes who have competed at the games and who uphold the values and practices of the Olympic Charter and the World Olympians Association Code of Conduct. IOC president and former Olympic gold-medalist fencer Thomas Bach was the first athlete to be granted use of the post-nominal initials. Within five days, more than 1,000 Olympians had registered.

WOA President Joël Bouzou told Around the Rings: "It's time to recognize becoming an Olympian is like becoming a PhD. It takes 10 years. You learn about perseverance, you learn about equity, fair play. You are an example of this for society at large."

Two and a half years after the initiative began, more than 14,000 Olympians had been granted the use of the OLY post-nominal letters and "growing [the] global OLY community" remained a priority of the World Olympians Association.

In 2022, the post-nominal letters PLY were introduced for athletes who have participated in the Paralympic Games.
