= Cycling at the 2020 Summer Olympics – Women's road time trial =

Women's road time trial at the Games of the XXXII Olympiad
- Olympic Cycling
- Venues: Fuji Speedway
- Date: 28 July 2021
- Competitors: 25 from 20 nations
- Winning time: 30:13.49

Medalists
| 1st place, gold medalist(s) | | Annemiek van Vleuten; Netherlands |
| 2nd place, silver medalist(s) | | Marlen Reusser; Switzerland |
| 3rd place, bronze medalist(s) | | Anna van der Breggen; Netherlands |

The women's road time trial event at the 2020 Summer Olympics took place on 28 July 2021 around the Fuji Speedway in Shizuoka Prefecture. 25 cyclists from 20 nations competed in the event.

The race was won by Annemiek van Vleuten of Netherlands, her second Olympic medal at these Games. Van Vleuten set the fastest times at both intermediate time checks before setting the only time under 31 minutes. She won by 56 seconds over the silver medalist, Marlen Reusser of Switzerland. Reusser set the fourth and fifth fastest times at the first two time checks, respectively. Her final split allowed her to move into second, becoming the only rider within a minute of van Vleuten's time. The bronze medal went to Anna van der Breggen, the world champion and van Vleuten's compatriot. She was faster than Reusser at both time checks before Reusser eventually moved ahead by five seconds at the finish.

== Background ==
This was the 7th appearance of the event, previously held at every Summer Olympics since 1996. The reigning Olympic champion was Kristin Armstrong of the United States who retired in 2016. The reigning World Champion was Anna van der Breggen of the Netherlands.

An event preview from Olympics.com identified the Dutch team of van der Breggen and Annemiek van Vleuten as difficult to beat while Chloé Dygert, the world champion in the discipline in 2019, was also noted as a potential favourite if healthy.

== Qualification ==
A National Olympic Committee (NOC) could enter up to 2 qualified cyclists in the women's road time trial. All quota places are assigned to the NOC, which may select the cyclists that compete. The time trial quota places did not allow NOCs to send additional cyclists; NOCs had to have qualified places in the road race to earn time trial quota places. There were 25 total quota spots available for the race, allocated as follows:

1. The first 15 nations in the UCI World Rankings received one place each.
2. The ten best-ranked nations at the 2019 World Championship received one place each. An NOC could earn places by qualifying in both ways; this was the case of the Netherlands, Germany, the United States, Australia, Canada, and France.
3. Since Asia was not yet represented, a spot was given to its highest-ranked nation, Japan. This went at the expense of the 15-th ranked team, France, who had one competitor left. Because qualification was complete by 22 October 2019, this allocation was unaffected by the COVID-19 pandemic.
4. One additional place was added for Refugee Olympic Team member Masomah Ali Zada.
5. Swedish competitor Emilia Fahlin withdrew on 15 July and was not replaced.

== Competition format and course ==
The time trial is a race against the clock. The 25 competing cyclists started at intervals of a minute and a half. The time trial events used a 22.1-kilometre (13.7 mi) circuit that began on the Fuji Speedway before descending towards the exit. Afterwards, the riders gradually climbed for 5 kilometres (3.1 mi) towards the first intermediate time check. The riders then began another descent towards the second time check, looping back towards the entrance of the Speedway. After passing through the entrance, the riders tackled a 1.4-kilometre (0.87 mi) climb before going inside the Speedway proper. The riders rode through the Speedway before the lap ended on the finish line. The women rode this circuit once with an elevation gain of approximately 423 metres (1,388 ft).

== Start list ==
Nations:

| Cyclists | Nations |
|---|---|
| 2 | Australia, Canada, Germany, Netherlands, United States |
| 1 | 15 nations |

== Race overview ==
The time trial commenced at 11:30 Japan Standard Time (UTC+9) with Masomah Ali Zada (Refugee Olympic Team) the first rider off the start ramp. The first rider to set a benchmark time was Karol-Ann Canuel (Canada). She set a time of 33:07.97, which stood until Sarah Gigante (Australia) finished with a time of 33:01.60. Two riders, Leah Kirchmann (Canada) and Lisa Klein (Germany), came close to beating Gigante's time but both riders fell short by less than half a second. Gigante was eventually knocked off the top spot by Juliette Labous (France), who set the first time under 33 minutes with a time of 32:42.14. She was soon beaten by Ashleigh Moolman Pasio, who was four and a half seconds faster than Labous.

The favorites soon started the course, beginning with Amber Neben (United States). She set a time of 31:26.13, the first time under 32 minutes. However, just behind her, Annemiek van Vleuten (Netherlands) was speeding up the course. She was the fastest at both intermediate time checks before finishing with a time of 30:13.49, the only time under 31 minutes. Her time eventually stood until the end, winning the gold medal as a follow-up to her silver medal finish at the road race. Grace Brown (Australia) looked to threaten van Vleuten's time as she was only six seconds slower at the first time check. However, she gradually lost time towards the rest of the course before eventually going more than a minute slower. The last three riders off the start ramp were Marlen Reusser (Switzerland), Chloé Dygert (United States), and Anna van der Breggen (Netherlands). At the first time check, Reusser was only fourth fastest at 28 seconds down while van der Breggen was third fastest, only 18 seconds behind. Meanwhile, Dygert struggled from the start as she was 51 seconds down at the first time check before eventually setting the seventh fastest time. At the second time check, van der Breggen and Reusser continued to lose time, going 29 and 42 seconds slower, respectively. At the finish, Reusser was able to move into second to take the silver medal by five seconds over van der Breggen, who took the bronze medal.

== Results ==
Result
| Rank | # | Cyclist | Nation | Time | Diff. |
|---|---|---|---|---|---|
| 1st place, gold medalist(s) | 6 | Annemiek van Vleuten | Netherlands | 30:13.49 | |
| 2nd place, silver medalist(s) | 3 | Marlen Reusser | Switzerland | 31:09.96 | + 56.47 |
| 3rd place, bronze medalist(s) | 1 | Anna van der Breggen | Netherlands | 31:15.12 | + 1:01.63 |
| 4 | 5 | Grace Brown | Australia | 31:22.22 | + 1:08.73 |
| 5 | 7 | Amber Neben | United States | 31:26.13 | + 1:12.64 |
| 6 | 4 | Lisa Brennauer | Germany | 32:10.71 | + 1:57.22 |
| 7 | 2 | Chloé Dygert | United States | 32:29.89 | + 2:16.40 |
| 8 | 10 | Ashleigh Moolman | South Africa | 32:37.60 | + 2:24.11 |
| 9 | 13 | Juliette Labous | France | 32:42.14 | + 2:28.65 |
| 10 | 9 | Elisa Longo Borghini | Italy | 33:00.89 | + 2:47.40 |
| 11 | 20 | Sarah Gigante | Australia | 33:01.60 | + 2:48.11 |
| 12 | 15 | Leah Kirchmann | Canada | 33:01.64 | + 2:48.15 |
| 13 | 14 | Lisa Klein | Germany | 33:01.97 | + 2:48.48 |
| 14 | 22 | Karol-Ann Canuel | Canada | 33:07.97 | + 2:54.48 |
| 15 | 19 | Omer Shapira | Israel | 33:15.84 | + 3:02.35 |
| 16 | 12 | Alena Amialiusik | Belarus | 33:21.41 | + 3:07.92 |
| 17 | 8 | Emma Norsgaard Jørgensen | Denmark | 33:50.18 | + 3:36.69 |
| 18 | 23 | Anna Shackley | Great Britain | 34:13.60 | + 4:00.11 |
| 19 | 24 | Julie Van de Velde | Belgium | 34:23.49 | + 4:10.00 |
| 20 | 18 | Katrine Aalerud | Norway | 34:33.38 | + 4:19.89 |
| 21 | 17 | Christine Majerus | Luxembourg | 34:34.13 | + 4:20.64 |
| 22 | 21 | Eri Yonamine | Japan | 34:34.97 | + 4:21.48 |
| 23 | 16 | Margarita Victoria García | Spain | 34:39.96 | + 4:26.47 |
| 24 | 11 | Anna Plichta | Poland | 34:56.95 | + 4:43.46 |
| 25 | 25 | Masomah Ali Zada | Refugee Olympic Team | 44:04.31 | + 13:50.82 |
