= Athletics at the 1980 Summer Olympics – Men's hammer throw =

Men's hammer throw at the Games of the XXII Olympiad
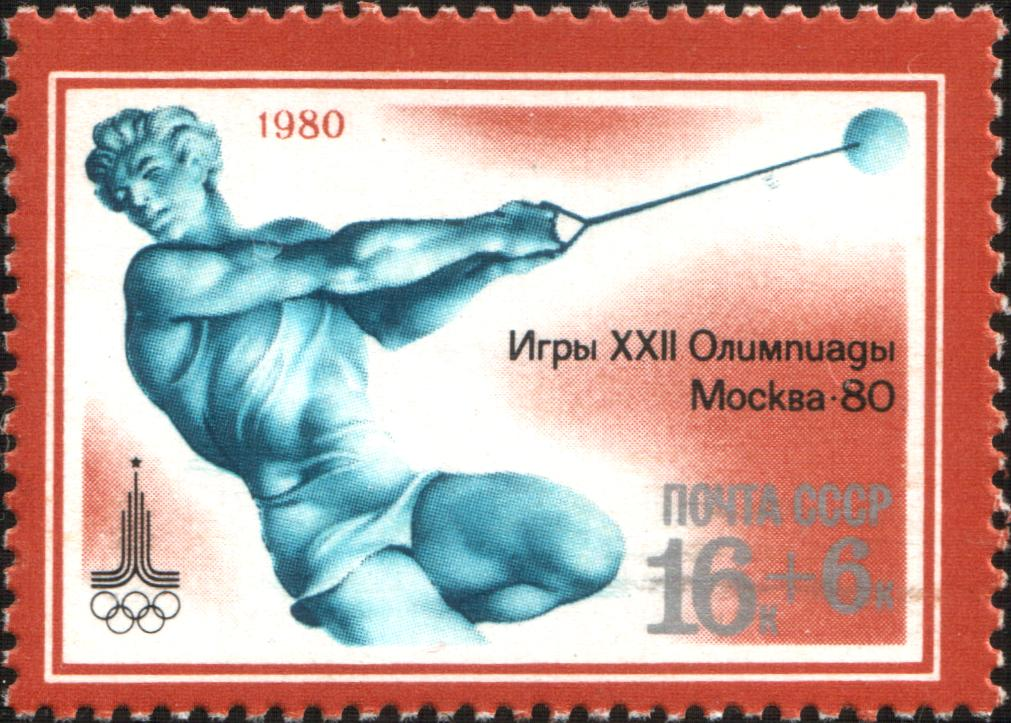
- Soviet stamp commemorating 1980 Olympic hammer throw
- Venue: Luzhniki Stadium
- Dates: 30 & 31 July
- Competitors: 17 from 13 nations
- Winning distance: 81.80 WR

Medalists
1st place, gold medalist(s)		Yuriy Sedykh; Soviet Union
2nd place, silver medalist(s)		Sergey Litvinov; Soviet Union
3rd place, bronze medalist(s)		Jüri Tamm; Soviet Union

The men's hammer throw event at the 1980 Summer Olympics in Moscow, Soviet Union had an entry list of 17 competitors from 13 nations, with one qualifying group before the final (12) took place on 31 July 1980. Top 12 and ties and all those reaching 72.00 metres advanced to the final. The maximum number of athletes per nation had been set at 3 since the 1930 Olympic Congress. The event was won by Yuriy Sedykh of the Soviet Union, repeating as Olympic champion. He was the eighth man to win multiple medals in the event and third to have at least two gold medals (John Flanagan had three). Just as in 1976, Sedykh led the Soviet team to a medal sweep, with Sergey Litvinov taking silver and Jüri Tamm bronze. The gold medal was the Soviet Union's third consecutive and fifth overall in the men's hammer throw, second all-time to the United States's seven.

== Background ==
This was the 18th appearance of the event, which has been held at every Summer Olympics except 1896. Three of the 12 finalists from the 1976 Games returned: gold medalist Yuriy Sedykh of the Soviet Union, seventh-place finisher Chris Black of Great Britain, and twelfth-place finisher Peter Farmer of Australia. Sedykh was a heavy favorite to repeat. His teammates, Sergey Litvinov and Jüri Tamm, were his biggest challengers. The most significant absence due to the American-led boycott was Karl-Hans Riehm of West Germany, who had been undefeated in 1979.

Cuba and Kuwait each made their debut in the event. Great Britain appeared for the 15th time, most of any nation competing but behind the United States' 17 appearances (missing the event for the first time due to the boycott).

== Competition format ==
The competition used the two-round format introduced in 1936, with the qualifying round completely separate from the divided final. In qualifying, each athlete received three attempts; those recording a mark of at least 72.00 metres advanced to the final. If fewer than 12 athletes achieved that distance, the top 12 would advance. The results of the qualifying round were then ignored. Finalists received three throws each, with the top eight competitors receiving an additional three attempts. The best distance among those six throws counted.

== Records ==
Prior to the competition, the existing world and Olympic records were as follows.

World record	Sergey Litvinov (URS)	81.66	Sochi, Soviet Union	24 May 1980
Olympic record	Yuriy Sedykh (URS)	77.52	Montreal, Canada	28 July 1976

Yuriy Sedykh broke his own Olympic record in the qualifying round, throwing the hammer 78.22 metres. In the very first throw of the final (Sedykh was the first athlete to throw), he broke the world record with 81.80 metres; this throw was not beaten during the competition. The top four athletes finished with better results than the old Olympic record.

== Schedule ==
All times are Moscow Time (UTC+3)

Date	Time	Round
Wednesday, 30 July 1980	11:30	Qualifying
Thursday, 31 July 1980	17:00	Final

== Results ==
=== Qualifying ===
Rank	Athlete	Nation	1	2	3	Distance	Notes
1	Yury Sedykh	Soviet Union	78.22 OR	—	—	78.22	Q, OR
2	Jüri Tamm	Soviet Union	76.24	—	—	76.24	Q
3	Sergey Litvinov	Soviet Union	X	75.24	—	75.24	Q
4	Detlef Gerstenberg	East Germany	75.04	—	—	75.04	Q
5	Roland Steuk	East Germany	X	73.52	—	73.52	Q
6	Harri Huhtala	Finland	71.42	72.46	—	72.46	Q
7	Armando Orozco	Cuba	X	X	72.28	72.28	Q
8	Giampaolo Urlando	Italy	68.40	72.20	—	72.20	Q
9	Ireneusz Golda	Poland	X	69.98	70.88	70.88	q
10	Juha Tiainen	Finland	70.64	70.46	70.82	70.82	q
11	Emanuil Dyulgerov	Bulgaria	X	69.24	70.60	70.60	q
12	Jiří Chamrád	Czechoslovakia	X	67.44	69.38	69.38	q
13	Peter Farmer	Australia	68.52	69.16	X	69.16	
14	Chris Black	Great Britain	66.02	66.74	X	66.74	
15	Paul Dickenson	Great Britain	X	64.22	63.90	64.22	
16	Seán Egan	Ireland	63.34	63.94	X	63.94	
17	Khaled Ghaloum	Kuwait	X	47.40	47.00	47.40	

=== Final ===
Nine athletes received additional throws (rather than eight) because of a tie at 8th place through the first three throws.

Rank	Athlete	Nation	1	2	3	4	5	6	Distance	Notes
1st place, gold medalist(s)	Yuriy Sedykh	Soviet Union	81.80 WR	81.46	79.68	X	80.98	80.70	81.80	WR
2nd place, silver medalist(s)	Sergey Litvinov	Soviet Union	80.64	X	X	X	X	X	80.64	
3rd place, bronze medalist(s)	Jüri Tamm	Soviet Union	77.84	78.96	77.92	77.26	X	76.86	78.96	
4	Roland Steuk	East Germany	74.34	76.00	75.58	77.26	77.54	X	77.54	
5	Detlef Gerstenberg	East Germany	73.64	74.60	73.98	X	X	73.40	74.60	
6	Emanuil Dyulgerov	Bulgaria	70.14	71.34	71.82	71.34	74.04	X	74.04	
7	Giampaolo Urlando	Italy	73.60	73.90	73.18	73.30	X	X	73.90	
8	Ireneusz Golda	Poland	72.38	73.74	X	X	X	X	73.74	
9	Harri Huhtala	Finland	69.78	X	71.82	71.96	71.82	71.02	71.96	
10	Juha Tiainen	Finland	X	71.38	71.08	Did not advance			71.38	
11	Armando Orozco	Cuba	X	67.76	68.68	Did not advance			68.68	
12	Jiří Chamrád	Czechoslovakia	68.16	65.94	66.58	Did not advance			68.16	

== See also ==
- 1980 Hammer Throw Year Ranking
- 1983 Men's World Championships Hammer Throw (Helsinki)
