= Hazel Green =

Hazel Green may refer to the following places in the United States:

- Hazel Green, Alabama
  - Hazel Green High School
- Hazel Green, Kentucky
- Hazel Green, Wisconsin
- Hazel Green (town), Wisconsin
- Hazel Green Township, Delaware County, Iowa

== See also ==
- Hazel Greene (born 1960), Irish archer, power lifter and fencer
