= Refugee Olympic Team at the 2020 Summer Olympics =

- Individuals compete under the Olympic Flag
- IOC code: EOR

in Tokyo, Japan July 23, 2021 – August 8, 2021
- Competitors: 29 in 12 sports
- Flag bearers (opening): Yusra Mardini; Tachlowini Gabriyesos
- Flag bearer (closing): Hamoon Derafshipour
- Medals: Gold 0 Silver 0 Bronze 0 Total 0

Summer Olympics appearances (overview)
- 2016; 2020; 2024; 2028

The IOC Refugee Olympic Team competed at the 2020 Summer Olympics in Tokyo, Japan as independent Olympic participants.

A total of 29 athletes including 19 men and 10 women from 11 different nations competed in 12 different sports including athletics, badminton, boxing, canoeing, cycling, judo, karate, shooting, swimming, taekwondo, weightlifting and wrestling. The team included refugees from Afghanistan, Cameroon, the Republic of the Congo, the Democratic Republic of the Congo, Eritrea, Iran, Iraq, South Sudan, Sudan, Syria and Venezuela.

== Background ==
The IOC code is the French acronym "EOR", which stands for Équipe olympique des réfugiés. This was the second appearance of a refugee team in the summer Olympics, following the 2016 Summer Olympics.

For the 2020 Games, the team included 29 athletes, up from 10 in the 2016 team. The team comprised athletes originating from 11 nations who currently reside and train across 13 host nations, supported by the IOC's Olympic Scholarships for Refugee Athletes program.

At the parade of nations, the IOC Team, according to the Japanese script traditional order and English pronunciation Ai Ō Shī of IOC in Japanese, was the second to parade after Greece who traditionally parade first.

== Team selection ==
The team was selected on 8 June 2021.

Athlete	Country of origin	Host NOC	Sport	Event
Dorian Keletela	Congo	Portugal	Athletics	Men's 100 m
Rose Lokonyen	South Sudan	Kenya	Athletics	Women's 800 m
James Chiengjiek	South Sudan	Kenya	Athletics	Men's 800 m
Anjelina Lohalith	South Sudan	Kenya	Athletics	Women's 1500 m
Paulo Amotun Lokoro	South Sudan	Kenya	Athletics	Men's 1500 m
Jamal Abdelmaji Eisa Mohammed	Sudan	Israel	Athletics	Men's 5000 m
Tachlowini Gabriyesos	Eritrea	Israel	Athletics	Men's marathon
Aram Mahmoud	Syria	Netherlands	Badminton	Men's singles
Wessam Salamana	Syria	Germany	Boxing	Men's light welterweight
Eldric Sella	Venezuela	Trinidad and Tobago	Boxing	Men's middleweight
Saeid Fazloula	Iran	Germany	Canoeing	Men's K-1 1000 m
Masomah Ali Zada	Afghanistan	France	Cycling	Women's time trial
Ahmad Wais	Syria	Switzerland	Cycling	Men's time trial
Sanda Aldass	Syria	Netherlands	Judo	Mixed team
Ahmad Alikaj	Syria	Germany	Judo	Mixed team
Muna Dahouk	Syria	Netherlands	Judo	Mixed team
Javad Mahjoub	Iran	Canada	Judo	Mixed team
Popole Misenga	DR Congo	Brazil	Judo	Mixed team
Nigara Shaheen	Afghanistan	Russia	Judo	Mixed team
Wael Shueb	Syria	Germany	Karate	Men's kata
Hamoon Derafshipour	Iran	Canada	Karate	Men's kumite
Luna Solomon	Eritrea	Switzerland	Shooting	Women's 10 m air rifle
Alaa Maso	Syria	Germany	Swimming	Men's 50 m freestyle
Yusra Mardini	Syria	Germany	Swimming	Women's 100 m butterfly
Dina Pouryounes	Iran	Netherlands	Taekwondo	Women's –49 kg
Kimia Alizadeh	Iran	Germany	Taekwondo	Women's –57 kg
Abdullah Sediqi	Afghanistan	Belgium	Taekwondo	Men's –68 kg
Cyrille Fagat Tchatchet II	Cameroon	United Kingdom	Weightlifting	Men's –96 kg
Aker Al-Obaidi	Iraq	Austria	Wrestling	Men's freestyle –67 kg

== Competitors ==
In total, 29 refugee athletes competed at the 2020 Summer Olympics in Tokyo, Japan.

Sport	Men	Women	Total
Athletics	5	2	7
Badminton	1	0	1
Boxing	2	0	2
Canoeing	1	0	1
Cycling	1	1	2
Judo	3	3	6
Karate	2	0	2
Shooting	0	1	1
Swimming	1	1	2
Taekwondo	1	2	3
Weightlifting	1	0	1
Wrestling	1	0	1
Total	19	10	29

== Athletics ==
In total seven refugee athletes took part in the athletics events.

Track & road events
Men

Athlete	Event	Heat		Quarterfinal		Semifinal		Final	
Athlete	Event	Result	Rank	Result	Rank	Result	Rank	Result	Rank
Dorian Keletela	100 m	10.33	1 Q	10.41	8	Did not advance			
James Nyang Chiengjiek	800 m	2:02.04	8	—N/a		Did not advance			
Paulo Amotun Lokoro	1500 m	3:51.78	13	—N/a		Did not advance			
Jamal Abdelmaji Eisa Mohammed	5000 m	13.42.98	13	—N/a				Did not advance	
Tachlowini Gabriyesos	Marathon	—N/a						2:14:02	16

Women

Athlete	Event	Heat		Semifinal		Final	
Athlete	Event	Result	Rank	Result	Rank	Result	Rank
Rose Lokonyen	800 m	2:11.87 PB	8	Did not advance			
Anjelina Lohalith	1500 m	4:31.65 PB	14	Did not advance			

== Badminton ==
In total one refugee athlete took part in the badminton events.

Aram Mahmoud competed in the men's singles event after he received an invitation from the IOC.

Athlete	Event	Group stage			Elimination	Quarterfinal	Semifinal	Final / BM	
Athlete	Event	Opposition Score	Opposition Score	Rank	Opposition Score	Opposition Score	Opposition Score	Opposition Score	Rank
Aram Mahmoud	Men's singles	Christie (INA); L (8–21, 14–21)	Loh (SGP); L (15–21, 12–21)	3	Did not advance				

== Boxing ==
In total two refugee athletes took part in the boxing events.

Athlete	Event	Round of 32	Round of 16	Quarterfinals	Semifinals	Final	
Athlete	Event	Opposition Result	Opposition Result	Opposition Result	Opposition Result	Opposition Result	Rank
Wessam Salamana	Men's lightweight	Oliveira (BRA); L 0–5	Did not advance				
Eldric Sella	Men's middleweight	Cedeño (DOM); L RSC	Did not advance				

Key

- RSC = Referee stopped contest

== Canoeing ==
In total one refugee athlete took part in the canoeing events.

Athlete	Event	Heats		Quarterfinals		Semifinals		Final	
Athlete	Event	Time	Rank	Time	Rank	Time	Rank	Time	Rank
Saeid Fazloula	Men's K-1 1000 m	3:52.631	4 QF	3:52.614	4	Did not advance			

== Cycling ==
In total two refugee athletes took part in the cycling events.

Athlete	Event	Time	Rank
Ahmad Wais	Men's time trial	1:08:40.46	38
Masomah Ali Zada	Women's time trial	44:04.31	25

== Judo ==
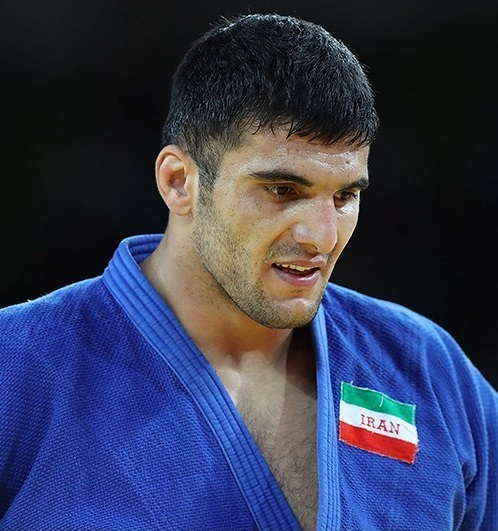
Javad Mahjoub

In total six refugee athletes took part in the judo events.

Athlete	Event	Round of 64	Round of 32	Round of 16	Quarterfinals	Semifinals	Repechage	Final / BM	
Athlete	Event	Opposition Result	Opposition Result	Opposition Result	Opposition Result	Opposition Result	Opposition Result	Opposition Result	Rank
Ahmad Alikaj	Men's −73 kg	Makhmadbekov (TJK); L 00–10	Did not advance						
Popole Misenga	Men's −90 kg	Bye	Tóth (HUN); L 00–10	Did not advance					
Javad Mahjoub	Men's +100 kg	—N/a	Frey (GER); W 01–00	Krpálek (CZE); L 00–11	Did not advance				
Sanda Aldass	Women's −57 kg	—N/a	Perišić (SRB); L 00–10	Did not advance					
Muna Dahouk	Women's −63 kg	—N/a	del Toro (CUB); L 00–10	Did not advance					
Nigara Shaheen	Women's −70 kg	—N/a	Portela (BRA); L 00–10	Did not advance					

Mixed

Athlete	Event	Round of 16	Quarterfinals	Semifinals	Repechage	Final / BM	
Athlete	Event	Opposition Result	Opposition Result	Opposition Result	Opposition Result	Opposition Result	Rank
Sanda Aldass; Ahmad Alikaj; Muna Dahouk; Javad Mahjoub; Popole Misenga; Nigara Shaheen	Team	Germany; L 0–4	Did not advance				

== Karate ==
In total two refugee athletes took part in the karate events.

Kumite

Athlete	Event	Round robin					Semifinals	Final	
Athlete	Event	Opposition Result	Opposition Result	Opposition Result	Opposition Result	Rank	Opposition Result	Opposition Result	Rank
Hamoon Derafshipour	Men's −67 kg	Da Costa (FRA); L 0–4	Madera (VEN); W 9–3	Al-Masatfa (JOR); L 0–3	Kalniņš (LAT); W 5–3	3	Did not advance		5

Kata

Athlete	Event	Elimination round		Ranking round		Final / BM	
Athlete	Event	Score	Rank	Score	Rank	Opposition Result	Rank
Wael Shueb	Men's kata	23.30	6	Did not advance			

== Shooting ==
In total one refugee athlete took part in the shooting events.

Athlete	Event	Qualification		Final	
Athlete	Event	Points	Rank	Points	Rank
Luna Solomon	Women's 10 m air rifle	605.9	50	Did not advance	

== Swimming ==
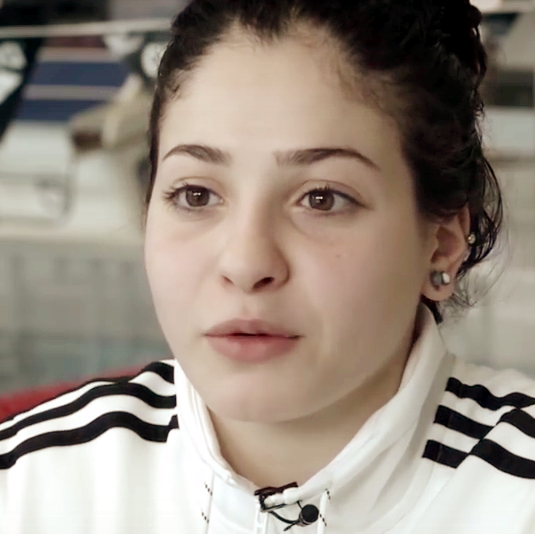
Yusra Mardini

In total two refugee athletes took part in the swimming events.

Athlete	Event	Heat		Semifinal		Final	
Athlete	Event	Time	Rank	Time	Rank	Time	Rank
Alaa Maso	Men's 50 m freestyle	23.30	44	Did not advance			
Yusra Mardini	Women's 100 m butterfly	1:06.78	33	Did not advance			

== Taekwondo ==
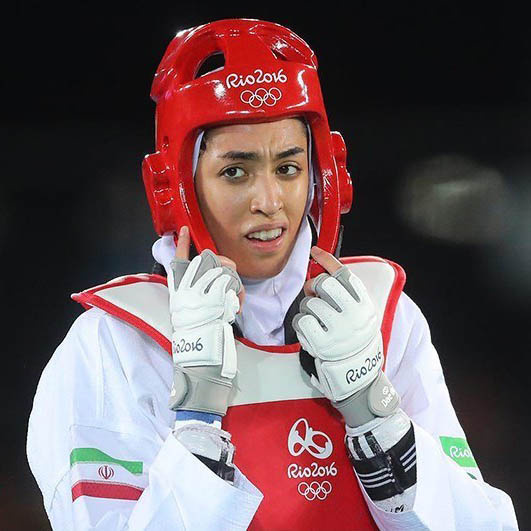
Kimia Alizadeh

In total three refugee athletes took part in the taekwondo events.

Athlete	Event	Qualification	Round of 16	Quarterfinals	Semifinals	Repechage	Final / BM	
Athlete	Event	Opposition Result	Opposition Result	Opposition Result	Opposition Result	Opposition Result	Opposition Result	Rank
Abdullah Sediqi	Men's −68 kg	Bye	Zhao S (CHN); L 20–22	Did not advance				
Dina Pouryounes	Women's −49 kg	Bye	Wu Jy (CHN); L 3–26 PTG	Did not advance				
Kimia Alizadeh	Women's −57 kg	Kiani (IRI); W 18–9	Jones (GBR); W 16–12	Zhou Lj (CHN); W 9–8	Minina (ROC); L 3–10	Bye	İlgün (TUR); L 6–8	5

== Weightlifting ==
In total one refugee athlete took part in the weightlifting events.

Athlete	Event	Snatch		Clean & jerk		Total	Rank
Athlete	Event	Result	Rank	Result	Rank	Total	Rank
Cyrille Fagat Tchatchet II	Men's −96 kg	155	13	195	10	350	10

== Wrestling ==
In total one refugee athlete took part in the wrestling events.

Key:

- VT (ranking points: 5–0 or 0–5) – Victory by fall.
- VB (ranking points: 5–0 or 0–5) – Victory by injury (VF for forfeit, VA for withdrawal or disqualification)
- PP (ranking points: 3–1 or 1–3) – Decision by points – the loser with technical points.
- PO (ranking points: 3–0 or 0–3) – Decision by points – the loser without technical points.
- ST (ranking points: 4–0 or 0–4) – Great superiority – the loser without technical points and a margin of victory of at least 8 (Greco-Roman) or 10 (freestyle) points.
- SP (ranking points: 4–1 or 1–4) – Technical superiority – the loser with technical points and a margin of victory of at least 8 (Greco-Roman) or 10 (freestyle) points.

Greco-Roman

Athlete	Event	Round of 16	Quarterfinal	Semifinal	Repechage	Final / BM	
Athlete	Event	Opposition Result	Opposition Result	Opposition Result	Opposition Result	Opposition Result	Rank
Aker Al-Obaidi	Men's −67 kg	Nasr (TUN); W 4–0 ^{ST}	Zoidze (GEO); L 0–4 ^{ST}	Did not advance			8

== See also ==
- Refugee Olympic Team at the 2016 Summer Olympics
- Refugee Paralympic Team at the 2020 Summer Paralympics
