= Peter Whiteside =

British modern pentathlete (1952–2020)

Personal information
- Born: 23 June 1952 Marton, Middlesbrough, England
- Died: 14 April 2020 (aged 67) Peterborough, England

Sport
- Sport: Modern pentathlon

Peter Whiteside (23 June 1952 – 14 April 2020) was a British modern pentathlete. He competed at the 1980 Summer Olympics, and he was the British Modern Pentathlon champion in 1985. He died from complications due to COVID-19.

== Biography ==
Whiteside was born in Marton, Middlesbrough, England in 1952. He excelled in swimming when he was young, winning multiple races in the north east of England. In 1969, he joined the Royal Air Force as a mechanic, taking up pentathlon four years later. In 1977, he moved over to the British Army working for the Royal Electrical and Mechanical Engineers. Here he worked with Jim Fox, who had won the gold medal as part of the Great Britain team at the 1976 Summer Olympics in Montreal. Later in 1977, Whiteside finished in second place in the British Modern Pentathlon Championship, just behind Olympian Danny Nightingale. Whiteside again finished in second place in 1983, before winning the British title in 1985.

Whiteside competed in the modern pentathlete at the 1980 Summer Olympics in Moscow. In the individual event, he finished in 21st place, and finished in eighth place in the team event.

In 1983, Whiteside was involved in a fencing accident that resulted in the death of his opponent, John Warburn. The pair were training in a practice session when part of Whiteside's blade entered Warburn's neck. The coroner recorded the death with the verdict of misadventure, with the death being the first in the history of British fencing.

Following his career in the army, Whiteside went on to become a coach at the Reading Fencing Club. He later became the Director of Fencing at several international pentathlon tournaments. In 2007, Whiteside moved to Cyprus, running a business in the sports nutrition sector. However, the following year, he was diagnosed with a brain tumour. Despite having a successful operation, another tumour appeared in 2016. This left him with brain damage and requiring the use of a wheelchair. He returned to England in 2018 for further care, but died of COVID-19 in April 2020. He was remembered in the In Memoriam section of the 2020 BBC Sports Personality of the Year Award ceremony.
