= IOC Athletes' Commission =

Olympic sports players' organization

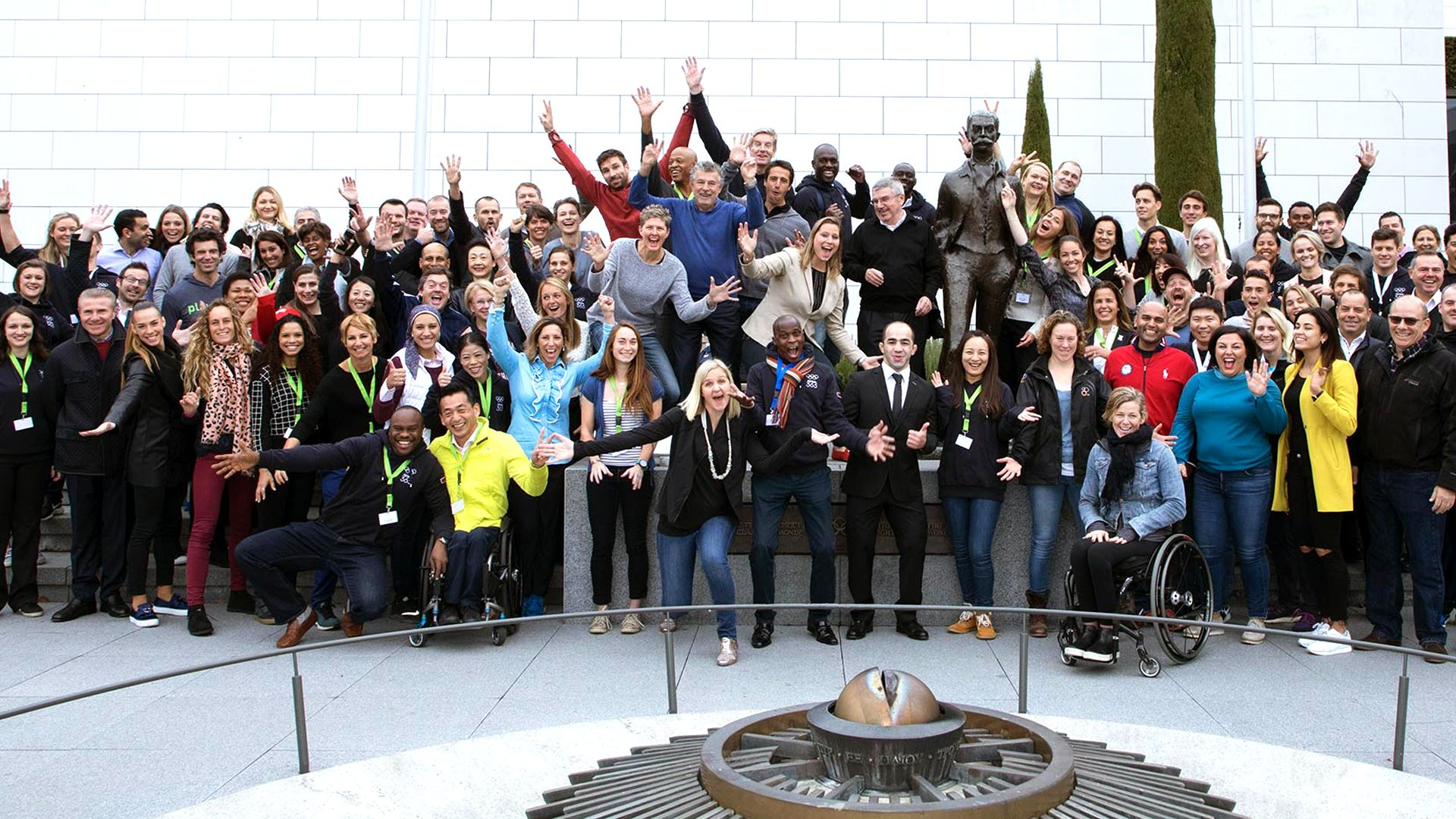
Athlete representatives gather at the International Olympic Committee headquarters in Lausanne, Switzerland

International Olympic Committee Athletes' Commission (IOC AC) is a majority elected body that serves as a link between athletes and the IOC. The mission of the IOC AC is to ensure that athletes' viewpoint remains at the heart of the Olympic Movement decisions, representing future, current and recently retired Olympic athletes. The IOC AC aims to provide athletes with a platform to share their voice and experiences, and be part of change and decisions shaping the future of sport.

Olympic Agenda 2020 and 2020+5 recommendations further support and protect clean and fair sport, and promote athletes' rights and responsibilities, which is at the heart of the commission's work. The current Chair of the IOC AC is Spanish basketball player Pau Gasol. His role is to set the commission's focus and lead strategy implementation following on the work of his predecessor, Emma Terho. As chair, he serves as a member of the IOC Executive Board on behalf of athletes.

== Functions and responsibilities ==
IOC AC members work to deliver priorities across all areas of the commission's responsibility. The IOC AC supports and facilitates communication between a global network of Athletes' Commissions (ACs), made up of athlete representatives across Olympic Movement stakeholders such as the National Olympic Committees (NOCs), International Federations (IFs), Organising Committees for the Olympic Games (OCOGs), the International Paralympic Committee (IPC), and the World Anti-Doping Agency (WADA).

The Commission may be invited by the IOC President to submit proposals, recommendations or reports to the IOC Executive Board or Session. AC members are represented on nearly every other IOC commission as well as the IOC Executive Board to ensure that the athletes' viewpoint is fully integrated into IOC decision-making.

== History ==
The IOC AC was established in 1981 by then-IOC President Juan Antonio Samaranch, who described its purpose in a letter to the man who would become one of his successors, Thomas Bach: "This Commission will act as the spokesman of all athletes to the International Olympic Committee." The first IOC AC meeting took place in Rome, Italy, in May 1982 with members Thomas Bach (Germany), Sebastian Coe (Great Britain), Edwin Moses (United States), Ivar Formo (Norway), Kipchoge Keino (Kenya), Vladislav Tretiak (Soviet Union), Svetla Otsetova (Bulgaria) and Bojan Križaj (Yugoslavia). They discussed topics still relevant to athletes today, including the fight against doping, gender equality, and the elimination from the Olympic Games of political influence and pressure.

For 13 years, the Commission members were appointed by the IOC President. Since the Winter Olympic Games in Lillehammer, Norway, in 1994, the majority of the members have been elected by their fellow athletes. In 2000, eight members of the IOC AC became IOC members, and the first athlete representative joined the IOC Executive Board. In 2014, athletes' views played a key role and were fully integrated into Olympic Agenda 2020, which consisted of 40 recommendations to shape the future of the Olympic Movement. One of the recommendations highlighted the need to support athletes both on and off the field of play, leading the commission to launch the IOC AC Strategy in September 2017. This was set out to represent and engage with athletes within the Olympic Movement and support their sporting and non-sporting careers. In February 2021, a new strategic roadmap, Olympic Agenda 2020+5 was proposed by the IOC Executive Board. It builds on the existing agenda to further support athletes and promote athletes' rights and responsibilities.

== Strategy ==
The development and launch of the IOC AC Strategy was a collective effort that involved AC members from Continental Associations (CAs), IFs and many other Olympic Movement stakeholders. It was unveiled to the global athlete community in November 2017 during the International Athletes' Forum.

The protection and promotion of clean and fair sport is at the heart of the commission's work, and its Strategy sets out to engage with athletes globally, to understand their perspective, and engage with the entire Olympic Movement to ensure that athletes' voices are taken into consideration as part of the decision-making process. The Strategy outlines an 'all-in' mantra and mentality which commit to applying the Strategy within the Olympic Movement.

The Strategy is composed of four pillars. Pillars 1 and 2 relate to the IOC AC's role with athletes:

- to empower athlete participation in Olympic Movement decision-making processes
- to support athletes' development in their sporting and non-sporting careers

The goal of these pillars is to ensure that all athlete representatives are empowered through a worldwide network of effective ACs.

Pillars 3 and 4 relate to the IOC AC's role within the Olympic Movement:

- to promote athlete involvement in decision-making across the Olympic Movement
- to ensure athlete representation in Olympic Movement decision-making

The goals of these pillars are to ensure that the value of athlete involvement is recognised, and that the viewpoint of athletes is represented within all Olympic Movement stakeholders.

The Commission measures results with performance indicators: (a) what progress has been made to achieve these goals; (b) how well strategic priorities are being delivered; and (c) how well resources have been optimised to deliver priorities.

== Membership ==
The IOC AC represents future, current and recently retired Olympic athletes. The commission has a maximum of 23 members, the majority elected by fellow Olympic athletes, who serve for a term of eight years and may also serve as IOC members. A maximum of 11 members can be appointed by the IOC President to balance regional, gender and sports representation.

Members of the IOC AC are volunteers, driven by their desire to represent athletes and support them to succeed on and off the field of play.

The chair and Vice Chair are members elected by the commission. The IOC AC Chair is also a member of the IOC Executive Board. Other members from Olympic Movement stakeholders can be appointed and invited to attend IOC AC meetings.

Current composition of the IOC AC

| Name | Role | Appointed / Elected | Term | Sport | Country |
|---|---|---|---|---|---|
| Pau Gasol | Chair | Elected | 2021 – 2028 | Basketball | Spain |
| Maja Martyna Włoszczowska | First Vice Chair | Elected | 2021 – 2028 | Mountain biking | Poland |
| Humphrey Kayange | Second Vice Chair | Appointed | 2021 – 2028 | Rugby | Kenya |
| Oluseyi Smith | Third Vice Chair | Appointed | 2022 – 2030 | Athletics/Bobsleigh | Canada |
| Soraya Aghaei | Member | Appointed | 2025 – 2033 | Badminton | Iran |
| Masomah Ali Zada | Member | Appointed | 2022 – 2030 | Cycling | Refugee Olympic Team |
| Husein Alireza | Member | Appointed | 2025 – 2033 | Rowing | Saudi Arabia |
| Alistair Brownlee | Member | Appointed | 2022 – 2030 | Triathlon | Great Britain |
| Kim Bui | Member | Elected | 2024 – 2032 | Gymnastics | Germany |
| Cheick Sallah Cissé | Member | Appointed | 2025 – 2033 | Taekwondo | Cote d'Ivoire |
| Marcus Daniell | Member | Elected | 2024 – 2032 | Tennis | New Zealand |
| Allyson Felix | Member | Elected | 2024 – 2032 | Athletics | United States |
| Martin Fourcade | Member | Elected | 2022 – 2030 | Biathlon | France |
| Jessica Fox | Member | Elected | 2024 – 2032 | Canoe slalom | Australia |
| Frida Hansdotter | Member | Elected | 2022 – 2030 | Alpine skiing | Sweden |
| Olufunke Oshonaike | Member | Appointed | 2025 – 2033 | Table tennis | Nigeria |
| Yuki Ota | Member | Elected | 2021 – 2028 | Fencing | Japan |
| Mariana Pajón | Member | Appointed | 2025 – 2033 | Cycling | Colombia |
| Federica Pellegrini | Member | Elected | 2021 – 2028 | Swimming | Italy |
| Johanna Talihärm | Member | Elected | 2026 – 2034 | Biathlon | Estonia |
| Won Yun-jong | Member | Elected | 2026 – 2034 | Bobsleigh | South Korea |

The IOC AC has Liaisons from all continents and other Olympic Movement stakeholders. The Chairs of all of the CAs' Athletes' Commissions, the Chair of the IPC Athlete Council and a World Olympians Association (WOA) representative are Liaisons to the IOC AC. IOC AC Liaisons are invited to attend various meetings of the IOC AC, share the athletes' viewpoint from their continent or organisation, and help facilitate the IOC AC's engagement with other organisations.

| Name | Organisation | IOC AC Liaison | Sport | Country |
|---|---|---|---|---|
| Gaby Ahrens | Association of National Olympic Committees of Africa (ANOCA) | 2023 | Shooting | Namibia |
| Vladyslava Kravchenko | International Paralympic Committee (IPC) | 2025 | Swimming | Malta |
| Johanna Talihärm | European Olympic Committees (EOC) | 2023 | Biathlon | Estonia |
| Ding Ning | Olympic Council of Asia (OCA) | 2025 | Table tennis | China |
| Ryan Pini | Oceania National Olympic Committees (ONOC) | 2025 | Swimming | Papua New Guinea |
| Isabel Swan | Pan American Sports Organization (PASO) | 2023 | Sailing | Brazil |
| Pernilla Wiberg | World Olympians Association (WOA) | 2021 | Alpine skiing | Sweden |

== Elections ==
IOC AC elections are held at each edition of the Olympic Games, with new members voted on to the commission by the athletes competing at that edition of the Games. Four or five members are elected at each Summer Games and two or three at each Winter Games, replacing members whose eight-year terms expire. The next election will take place at the Los Angeles 2028 Games, with candidates replacing current members Pau Gasol, Maja Martyna Włoszczowska, Federica Pellegrini, Yuki Ota and Humphrey Kayange.

To become a candidate for the IOC AC, an athlete must meet the eligibility criteria set out by the IOC. Candidates must either participate in the Olympic Games taking place at the time of the election or have participated in the previous edition of the Games. All NOCs that are not represented on the IOC AC are invited to submit a candidate to the IOC during the candidature phase launched one year before the opening ceremony of each Olympic Games.

== International Athletes' Forum ==
The IOC AC organises an International Athletes' Forum every two years. The aim of the Forum is to bring the global community of athlete representatives together and to emerge stronger and more united as a network, advocating change with one clear voice. The Forum allows for representatives from each IF, NOC, CA and OCOG, as well as athlete representatives from other organisations, to have a platform to share their voice and exchange ideas in order to take solutions back to their respective communities. The Forum includes panel discussions, Q&A sessions and interactive workshops to empower, inspire and unite the global athlete community.

There have been nine editions since the first Forum in 2002. The largest to date took place in Lausanne in 2019, with over 350 athlete representatives attending the biennial event.

2002

The 1st International Athletes' Forum took place in Lausanne (19-20 October), and concentrated on the role of athletes in the Olympic Movement. Key focuses included the fight against anti-doping, self-promotion for athletes during and after their sporting careers, and the integration of professional athletes into the Olympic Movement.

Athlete representatives who attended this 1st Forum recognised the work of the IOC in bringing together the ACs, and made clear their support for the Forum to be held on a regular basis. This historic Forum acted as a catalyst for improving athlete standing in the Olympic Movement, and led directly to the creation of the IOC Athlete Career Programme and other athlete support networks.

2005

The 2nd edition of the International Athletes' Forum (11-12 June) again took place in Lausanne, Switzerland, and looked at career transition after a career in sport. Key focuses included exploring how athletes could ensure they were set up for a career after retirement, and the roles of the NOCs, IFs and entourage in this transition.

The recommendations of this 2nd Forum emphasised the need to support and inform athletes during and after their sporting careers in order to create a smooth transition to life away from competition.

2007

The 3rd International Athletes' Forum (27-28 October) was held in Dubai, UAE, and explored the growing role of athletes in the Olympic Movement. Key focuses included athlete education and career management, athletes' image and networking, and athlete involvement in preparations for the Olympic Games.

This 3rd Forum reinforced the belief that education was an essential tool to help athletes during and after their careers, and the idea that athletes could be integrated further into the organisation of the Games.

2009

The 4th International Athletes' Forum (29-31 May) was organised in Marrakech, Morocco, and centred on athletes' standing within the Olympic Movement. Key focuses included the relationship between athletes and sporting bodies, health protection for athletes, and athletes' lives during and after elite competition.

This 4th Forum recognised recent progress in increasing athletes' standing within the Olympic Movement, and sought to strengthen the structures around athletes to further improve the support they received.

2011

The 5th International Athletes' Forum (8-10 October) took place in Colorado Springs, USA, and aimed to assess the various elements of athlete livelihood within the Olympic Movement. Key focuses included different aspects of athlete life, the role of the entourage, communication and social media, safety and security, anti-doping, and the Games-time experience.

This 5th Forum acknowledged the importance of athlete support, particularly with regard to the members of an athlete's entourage and sporting bodies involved in the Olympic Movement.

2013

The 6th International Athletes' Forum (27-29 June) was staged in Singapore and concentrated on athlete welfare in the Olympic Movement. Key focuses included athletes' Games-time experience, communication between athletes and Acs, and Rules 40 and 50 of the Olympic Charter.

This 6th Forum hailed the global impact of Acs and reiterated the benefits they bring, encouraging representatives to meet outside the official Forum programme when possible.

2015

The 7th International Athletes' Forum (8-10 October) was held in Lausanne, Switzerland, and aimed to assess the implementation of the athlete recommendations in Olympic Agenda 2020. Key focuses included athlete-related recommendations and empowering ACs and their chairpersons.

This 7th Forum received the Olympic Agenda 2020 athlete-related recommendations, and re-emphasised that ACs were a fundamental part of the Olympic Movement and should continue to work with stakeholders to ensure their effectiveness. The discussions resulted in an agreement to empower athletes through better communication and the provision of more information.

2017

The 8th International Athletes' Forum (11-13 November) was organised in Lausanne, Switzerland, and focused on the newly launched IOC AC Strategy and other important topics. It brought together over 100 athlete representatives, and key focuses included the four pillars of the Strategy, the fight against doping, empowering ACs, and the Athletes' Rights and Responsibilities Declaration.

This 8th Forum united behind the newly launched Strategy. It was agreed that the four pillars it included would shape the IOC AC's work in subsequent years.

2019

The 9th International Athletes' Forum (13-15 April) was held in Lausanne, Switzerland. The biggest-ever gathering of athletes' representatives, it included some 350 athlete representatives from 185 NOCs, 50 IFs, five ACs from CAs, the ACs of all the OCOGs of the upcoming Games, the IPC, WADA and the WOA. Key focuses included the impact of the IOC AC Strategy, the Athletes' Declaration of Rights and Responsibilities, and supporting ACs globally.

This Forum recognised the importance of the creation of the Athletes' Declaration of Rights and Responsibilities in 2018, and proposed nine key recommendations to support athletes. IOC President Thomas Bach expressed his support for the Declaration and encouraged athlete representatives to make their voices heard.

2021

2023

2025

== Athlete365 ==
Launched in 2018, Athlete365 is the IOC's athlete engagement initiative, uniting all information and support for athletes under a single brand. The IOC AC played a central role in the concept and delivery of Athlete365, which consists of a digital platform coupled with physical engagement during the Olympic Games. Athlete365 also connects with athletes' entourage members – e.g. coaches, family and sponsors – to guide them with specific topics to support their athletes.

The platform houses all of the IOC athlete programmes and activities, including Career+, Business Accelerator, Athlete365 Learning, Games-time information, Athletes' Declaration, AC resources, International Athletes' Forum, and support for athletes in matters such as safeguarding and mental health.

Athlete365 focuses on six key themes for athletes: Voice, Career, Finance, Integrity, Performance, and Well-being. Learning is central to all Athlete365 themes, and a dedicated platform hosts accessible and expert-led courses for all athletes and entourage members. The work of the IOC AC falls within the Voice theme of Athlete365, ensuring athletes are at the heart of, and heard by, the Olympic Movement, through empowering and amplifying the collective voice of athletes via the Global Network of Athletes' Representatives.

== Global consultations with athletes ==
The IOC AC often conducts consultations with athletes on specific topics to effectively capture the athletes' voice and ensure its input into IOC decision-making.

=== Rule 50 of the Olympic Charter ===
During the second half of 2020 and into 2021, the IOC AC conducted a global consultation on athlete expression at the Olympic Games.

The IOC AC published new Rule 50 guidelines in January 2020 to provide further clarity on existing opportunities to express views at the Olympic Games and where it is not considered appropriate. In 2019, while drafting the guidelines, the IOC AC consulted continuously with the global athlete community. In June 2020, the IOC Executive Board published a resolution against discrimination in which the Board supported the proposal from the IOC AC to lead a consultation with athletes on athlete protests and non-discrimination. The Athletes' Declaration Steering Committee, IFs, CAs, and NOC ACs also stated their support to the IOC AC on the consultation.

The objective of the consultation was to consult with the athlete community and explore additional ways as to how Olympic athletes can express their support for the principles important to them, while at the same time respecting the Olympic spirit. The consultation began in July 2020 with qualitative discussions with various ACs; a quantitative survey was launched in December 2020 on Athlete365 to gather input from athletes globally. Over 3,500 athletes from around the world shared their views in the survey, representing all Olympic sports and 185 NOCs.

Recommendations from the consultation are due to be finalised in the spring of 2021 and submitted to the IOC Executive Board for review.

== Athletes' Rights and Responsibilities Declaration ==
Driven by the IOC AC, the Athletes' Declaration is a historic, athlete-driven initiative developed by athletes for athletes, through a worldwide consultation process led by an athlete representative Steering Committee. The Declaration was presented and adopted at the 133rd IOC Session in Buenos Aires, Argentina, in 2018. It outlines a common set of aspirational rights and responsibilities for athletes within the Olympic Movement.

The Declaration states athletes' rights, which aspires to promote their ability and opportunity to:

- practise sport and compete without discrimination
- be part of a transparent, fair and clean sporting environment
- access general information on athlete and competition-related matters
- access education on sports-related matters and work or study while training and competing
- leverage opportunities to generate income in relation to their sporting career, name and likeness
- fair and equal gender representation
- protection of mental and physical health
- elect athlete representation within sporting organisations of the Olympic Movement
- report unethical behaviour without fear of retaliation
- privacy, including protection of personal information
- freedom of expression
- due process

The Declaration states athletes' responsibilities, which encourage them to:

- uphold Olympic values
- respect integrity of sport
- act in accordance with the IOC Code of Ethics
- comply with applicable national laws
- respect rights and well-being of everyone within the sporting environment, and refrain from political demonstration in competitions, venues and ceremonies
- respect the solidarity principle of the Olympic Movement
- act as a role mode, including to promote clean sport
- inform themselves and be aware of their responsibilities
- participate in hearings when requested to do so
- participate and vote in athlete representatives' elections
