= Abdullah Sediqi =

Afghani Taekwondo athlete

Abdullah Sediqi (born 25 December 1996) is a Taekwondo athlete from Afghanistan who competed at the 2020 Summer Games in the 68kg Taekwondo.

== Personal life ==
Sediqi currently lives in Antwerp, Belgium. Born in Guldara, Afghanistan, Sediqi fled the country in 2017 following death threats.

== Career ==
Sediqi won silver at the 2019 Spanish Open and bronze at the 2020 Dutch Open, in addition to representing World Taekwondo as a refugee athlete at the 2019 World Championships in Manchester.

Sediqi was included as one of 29 members of the IOC Refugee Olympic Team to compete at the 2020 Summer Games with his participation in the 68kg Taekwondo.
