= Luna Solomon =

Eritrean sport-shooter

Personal information
- Born: 1994 (age 30–31); Eritrea

Sport
- Sport: Sports shooting

Luna Solomon (born 1994) is an Eritrean sport shooter who now lives in Switzerland after fleeing Eritrea. She competed at both the 2020 Summer Olympics and 2024 Summer Olympics as part of the International Olympic Committee (IOC) Refugee Olympic Team.

== Early life ==
Solomon was born in 1994. She has eight siblings. In December 2014, she fled Eritrea due to conflict and human rights abuses. Solomon did not tell her family that she planned to leave; she traveled with several neighbors and had no passport. The group crossed the Libyan Desert, which was a difficult journey that took ten days and during which there was very little to eat or drink, and Solomon said that "a lot of people died on the way". She then crossed the Mediterranean Sea to Italy in a small boat. Her father died after she arrived in Europe, and Solomon became depressed and regretted leaving Eritrea and her family.

She arrived in Switzerland in 2015. After three years, she received official refugee status.

== Shooting career ==
Solomon wanted to begin a sport after arriving in Switzerland. She took up sport shooting through the Make a Mark project, founded by Italian three-time Olympic gold medallist Niccolò Campriani. The project reaches out to refugees in Lausanne and trains them to try to reach the minimum qualifying score in the 10m air rifle event. At first, Solomon struggled to understand the project, as she only understood shooting to be for the purpose of killing people and had not previously encountered sports shooting. It took her three months to be comfortable with shooting. She said that Campriani was patient and supportive.

Solomon began training four days a week and found that it gave her self-confidence. She said of shooting, "In sport I have finally found peace. On the range, there is just me, my thoughts, my hopes and my target."

She qualified for the 2020 Olympics and competed in the 10m air rifle event with Campriani as her coach. Solomon was last of the fifty competing shooters at the Olympics in her event. She said that other sports shooters at the event approached her to offer encouragement.

In 2023, she competed in the 2023 World Championships, where she placed 139th.

It was announced in May 2024 that Solomon would be competing as part of the Refugee Olympic Team in the 2024 Olympic Games. In June, she competed at the World Cup in Munich. Later in the year, she competed in the women's 10m air rifle event at the Olympics and finished in 43rd place.

== Private life ==
Solomon lives in Lausanne, Switzerland and has a son born in 2020.
