= Ahmad Wais =

Syrian cyclist

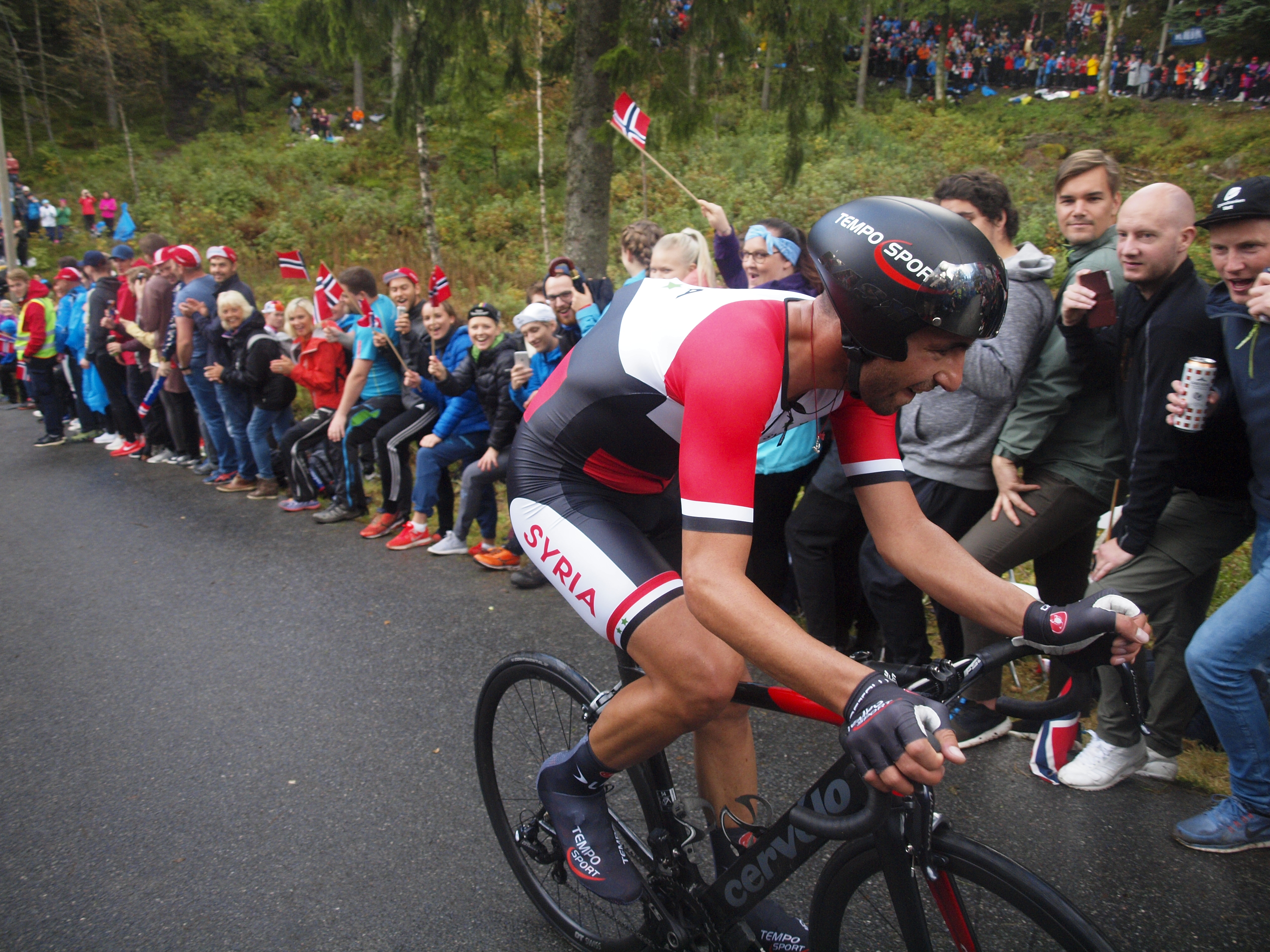
- Wais in 2017

Personal information
- Full name: Ahmad Badreddin Wais
- Nickname: Badri
- Born: 15 January 1991 (age 35) Aleppo, Syria
- Height: 181 cm (5 ft 11 in)
- Weight: 70 kg (154 lb)

Cycling career
- Sport: Cycling
- Current team: Team 74 haute savoie
- Discipline: Road
- Role: Rider
- Rider type: All-rounder

Amateur teams
- 2016: Marco Polo
- 2017: Tempo Sport
- 2018–2019: VC Horgen
- 2022–: Corbas Lyon Métropole

Professional teams
- 2018–2019: VIB Sports
- 2021: Kuwait Pro Cycling Team

Ahmad Badreddin Wais (born 15 January 1991) is a Syrian cyclist and Olympian, who currently rides for French amateur team Hexagone–Corbas Lyon Métropole. He has represented the IOC Olympic Refugee Team at the 2020 Summer Olympic held in Tokyo. He has also competed in six editions of the UCI Road World Championships.

== Biography ==
Ahmad Badreddin Wais was born January 15, 1991, in Aleppo, Syria. He began cycling at age 14 and went on to compete in the 2009 UCI Juniors World Championship. Wais continued training through the Syrian Civil War his family leaving him as they fled to Turkey in 2013. He lived alone in Damascus as a student until 2014, when he decided to leave the country as a refugee.

In 2014 Wais began his journey as a refugee, traveling by car through Syria and Lebanon, ultimately taking a boat to Turkey to reunite with his family. He then traveled by ship to Greece and eventually gained refugee status in Switzerland, which he reached by plane. Wais did not compete again in 2017, citing the physical and emotional toll of the ordeal; going so far as to put off training until 2015. In 2016, he was a member of the Dutch Marco Polo team.

He became a prospective candidate for the 2016 Refugee Olympic Team.

Wais has not returned to Syria since leaving, because he is classified as having evaded conscription by the Syrian Military.

He did not attend the 2016 Olympics. By 2020 his country was still in a state of civil war and this time he was named to the Olympic team, which took place in 2021 due to the worldwide pandemic. He rode in the individual time trial event.
