= Jiří Chamrád =

Czech hammer thrower

Personal information
- Nationality: Czech
- Born: 19 June 1954 (age 72) Ostrava, Czechoslovakia

Sport
- Sport: Athletics
- Event: Hammer throw

Jiří Chamrád (born 19 June 1954) is a Czech athlete. He competed in the men's hammer throw at the 1980 Summer Olympics.
