= Paul Four =

French modern pentathlete

Personal information
- Nickname: Paulo
- Nationality: France and Australian
- Born: 13 February 1956 (age 70) Katoomba, New South Wales, Australia
- Height: 1 m (3 ft 3 in)76
- Weight: 67 kg (148 lb) on Olympics 72kg in 2013

Sport
- Country: In Madagascar in 2011 to 2014
- Sport: Modern pentathlon
- Club: Fontainebleau

Achievements and titles
- Regional finals: Yes
- National finals: Yes
Medal record
Men's modern pentathlon
Representing France
Olympic Games
Bronze medal – third place	1984 Los Angeles	Team

Paul Four (born 13 February 1956) is a French former modern pentathlete who competed at the 1980 Summer Olympics and the 1984 Summer Olympics. At the 1980 Olympics, he placed 12th in the modern pentathlon, with a total of 5196 points. At the 1984 Olympics, he won a bronze medal in the team event alongside teammates Didier Boube and Joel Bouzou.
