= Jerome Hartigan =

Modern pentathlete

Personal information
- Born: 30 August 1957 (age 68) Ireland
- Education: Ithaca College

Sport
- Sport: Modern pentathlon

Jerome Hartigan (born 30 August 1957) is an Irish modern pentathlete. He competed at the 1980 Summer Olympics.

== Early life and education ==
Hartigan was born on 30 August 1957, in Ireland. He earned his Master's degree from Ithaca College and later coached their Men's Varsity Swimming and Diving Team.

== Career ==
Hartigan competed for Team Ireland at the 1980 Summer Olympics alongside Sackville Currie and Mark Hartigan. In 1988, Hartigan and Sophie Foster established Jumping Beans, a program to encourage brain development in pre-school aged children.
