= Masomah Ali Zada =

Afghan cyclist

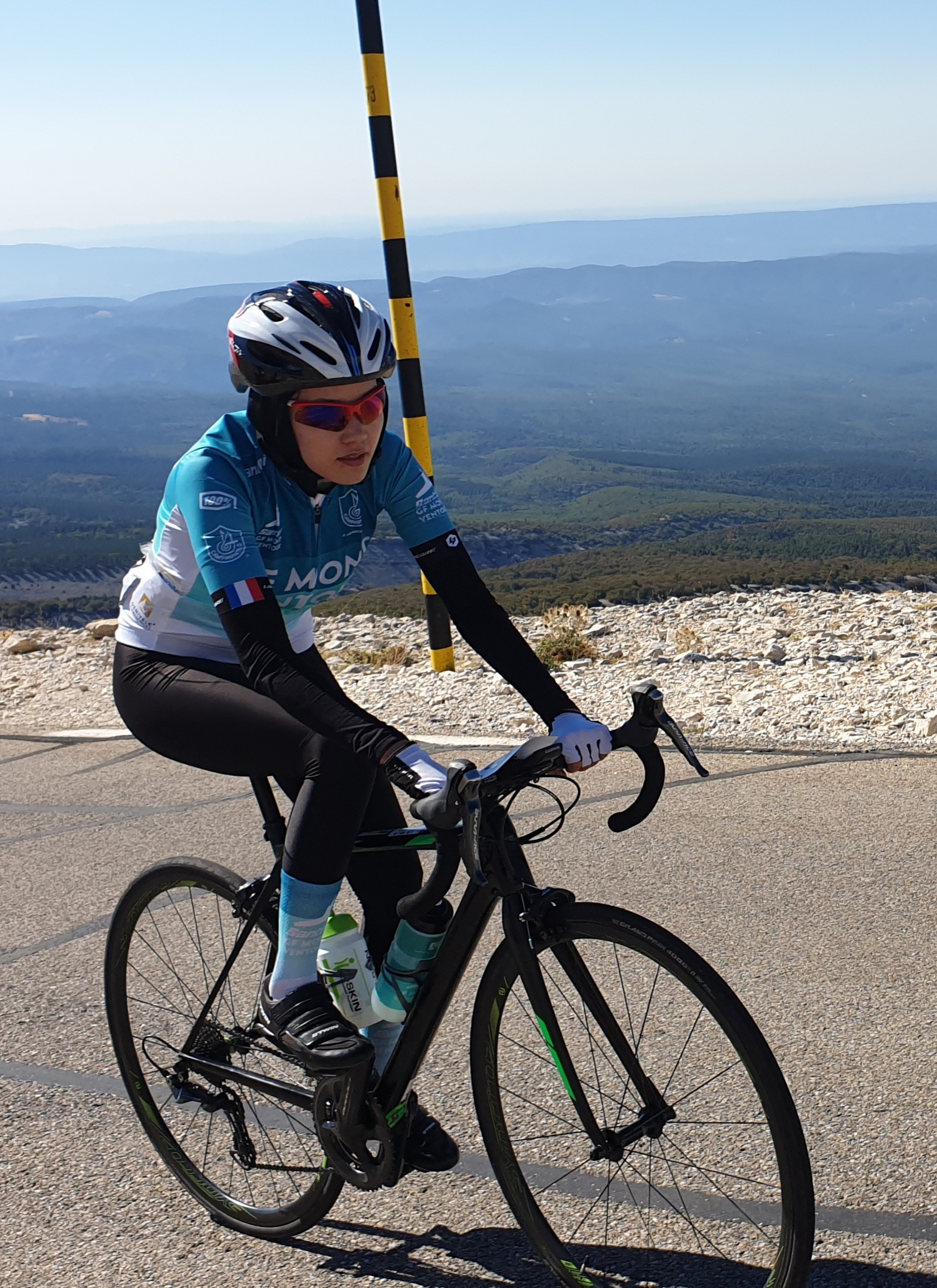

Personal information
- Born: 11 March 1996 (age 30) Afghanistan

Cycling career
- Sport: Cycling
- Discipline: Road
- Role: Rider

Masomah Ali Zada (born 11 March 1996) is a road cyclist, born in Afghanistan, who qualified for, and took part in, the 2020 Olympic Games as part of the International Olympic Committee (IOC) Refugee Olympic Team.

Born in Afghanistan, Ali Zada spent her early years in Iran, before returning to Afghanistan. Masomah learnt to ride in whilst living in Ghazni Province at the age of 9. Upon moving to Kabul in 2012 she found herself subject to physical and verbal harassment whilst cycling. Masomah and her family (her parents, three brothers and sister) fled Afghanistan in 2016 due to threats from the Taliban, and claimed asylum in France under a humanitarian visa.

Masomah studied masters in civil engineering at the University of Lille. She received an IOC Refugee Athlete Scholarship in 2019 and took part in the women's individual time trial at Tokyo 2020 Olympics, finishing 25th of 25.

In 2022, Ali Zada became a member of the Athletics' Commission of the International Olympic Committee – the first refugee athlete on any IOC commission.
