= Didier Boubé =

French modern pentathlete (born 1957)

Personal information
- Born: 13 February 1957 (age 69) Vichy, France

Sport
- Sport: Modern pentathlon
Medal record
Men's modern pentathlon
Representing France
Olympic Games
Bronze medal – third place	1984 Los Angeles	Team

Didier Boubé (born 13 February 1957) is a French former modern pentathlete. He competed at the 1984 Summer Olympics, winning a bronze medal in the team event, and 10th place in the individual event.
