= Muna Dahouk =

Syrian judoka (born 1995)

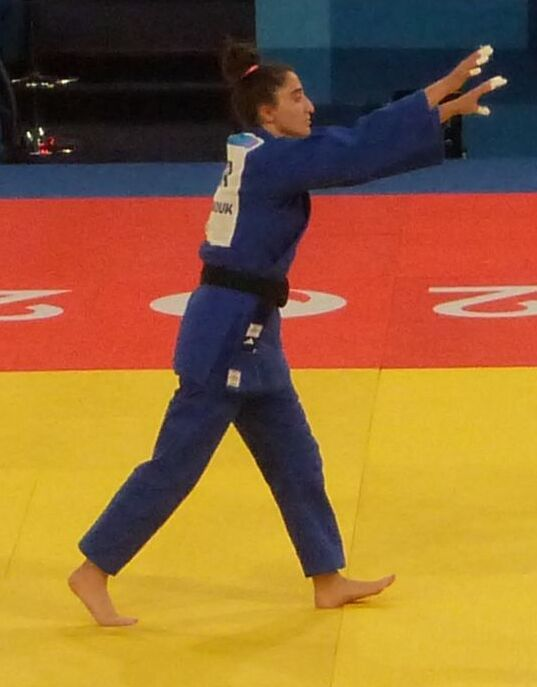
- Dahouk in 2024

Personal information
- Born: 27 August 1995 (age 30) Damascus, Syria
- Occupation: Judoka

Sport
- Country: Refugee Olympic Team
- Sport: Judo
- Weight class: ‍–‍57 kg, ‍–‍63 kg

Achievements and titles
- Olympic Games: R32 (2020, 2024)
- World Champ.: R32 (2023)
- European Champ.: R32 (2023, 2024)

Profile at external databases
- IJF: 55514
- JudoInside.com: 140766
- Updated on 29 July 2024

Muna Dahouk (Arabic: منى دهوك; born 27 August 1995) is a judoka from Syria who now lives in the Netherlands after fleeing the Syrian civil war. She competed at the 2020 Olympic Games and in the 2024 Olympic Games, both times as part of the IOC Refugee Olympic Team.

== Early life ==
She started judo in Damascus when she was six years old. Her father was a judo teacher, and her sister, Oula, also competes. After the civil war broke out, the family moved to a safer area, but her father died in 2015 due to a heart attack. In 2019, she fled Syria and joined her mother and brother in the Netherlands, and she now lives in 's-Hertogenbosch, capital of the Dutch province of North Brabant. After a decade away from the sport due to the civil war, she began training again in the Netherlands.

== Career ==
Dahouk competed at the 2019 Budapest Grand Prix, the 2020 Paris Grand Slam and the 2020 Düsseldorf Grand Slam.

Dahouk was selected as part of the IOC Refugee Team in June 2021. She competed at the 2020 Olympic Games in the women's 63 kg and the mixed team events and in both cases lost in the first round. In the individual event, she faced 2019 Pan American Games champion Maylín del Toro Carvajal.

Dahouk took part in the 2023 European Judo Championships in Montpellier as a member of the first refugee team at the European championships.

She competed in the 2024 Summer Olympics in Paris as part of the Refugee Olympic Team. She told CBS that she wants to use her role as a refugee athlete to break down stereotypes and challenge misconceptions about refugees: "I will represent the refugees around the world – to show people what the refugees can do. We are not weak people. We can be athletes, we can be students, we can be anything we want." At the Olympics, she competed in the women's 57 kg and mixed team events. She faced Kristine Jiménez in the preliminary round and lost to her. The refugee team lost in its first round.

== Personal life ==
She is the cousin of fellow judoka Sanda Aldass. While she was living in Syria, she graduated from a commercial and banking institute. She features in the Waad Al-Kateab documentary We Dare to Dream.
