= Sanda Aldass =

Syrian judoka (born 1990)

Personal information
- Born: 26 June 1990 (age 36) Damascus, Syria
- Occupation: Judoka

Sport
- Country: Refugee Olympic Team
- Sport: Judo
- Weight class: –57 kg

Sanda Aldass (Arabic: ساندا الدس; born 26 June 1990) is a judoka from Syria who competed at the 2020 Olympic Games as part of the IOC Refugee Olympic Team.

== Biography ==
Aldass fled Damascus in her homeland, Syria, in 2015, having previously been a member of Syria’s national judo team.

After arriving in the Netherlands, she spent six months in a refugee camp without her family. She has credited her desire to keep fit and training for judo helped her with the mental health difficulties that came from her circumstances.

She was eventually reunited with her son and her husband, Fadi Darwish, who is also her judo coach, and the family settled in Almere, Netherlands. They had two more children, and her husband's training credentials were successfully recognised in the Netherlands.

In 2019, Aldass joined the International Judo Federation Support Program, through which she took part in the Grand Slam events. Aldass competed at the 2020 Olympic Games in the Women's 57 kg and the Mixed team events. In the individual event she faced Marica Perisic from Serbia.

== Personal life ==
Married to Fadi Darwish, she is a mother of three. She is the cousin of fellow judoka Muna Dahouk.
