= World Olympians Association =

Association of former Olympic athletes

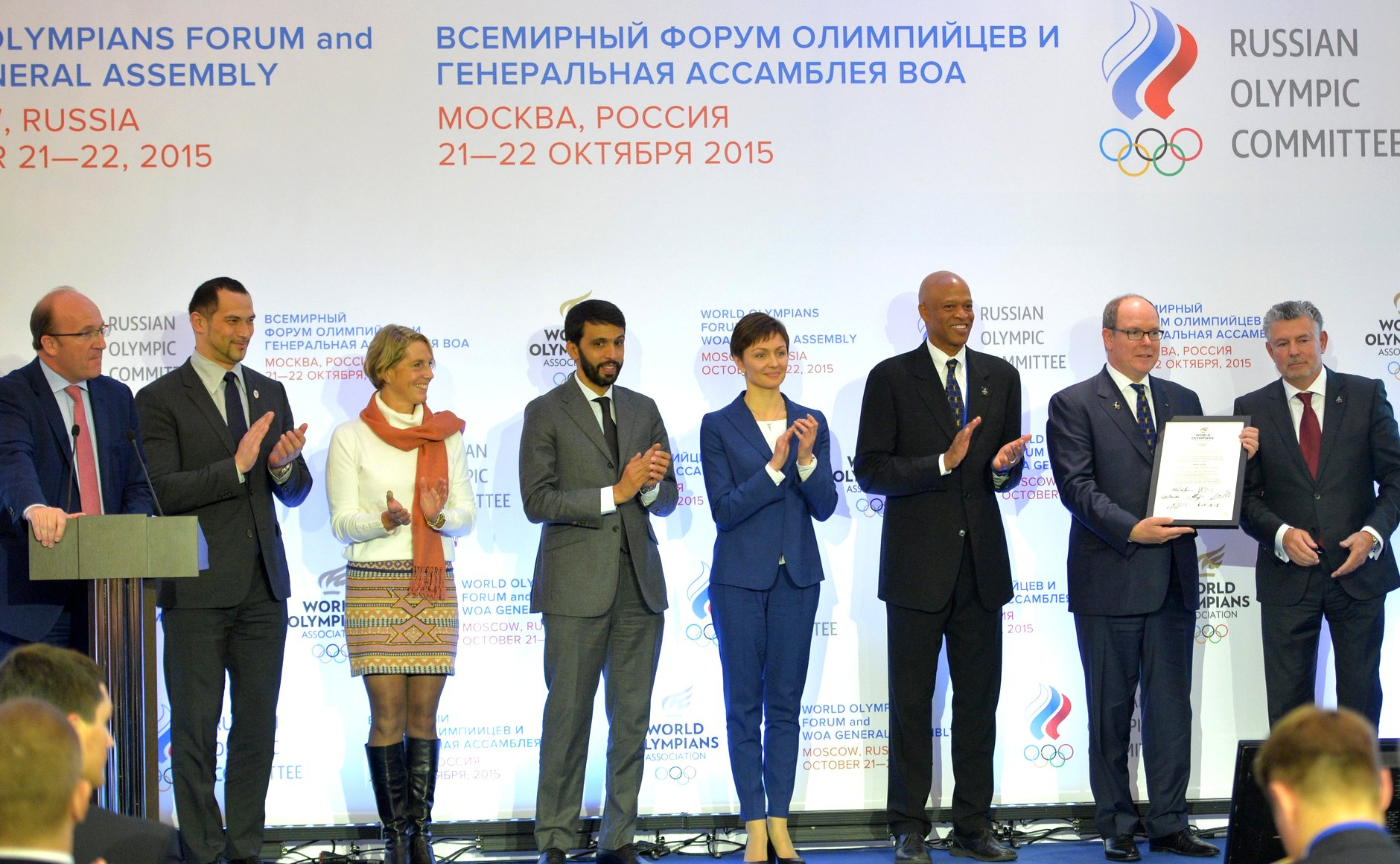
First World Olympians Forum, held by the World Olympians Association in Moscow, Russia, in 2015.

The World Olympians Association (WOA) is an independent association of Olympic Games competitors. Its stated objectives are to promote the Olympic ideals and fair play, advance environmental protection, educate against doping and drug use, supply educational resources, work against violence and intolerance, support diversity and equality, contribute to sport-related charities, host special hospitality centres, involve Olympians in social support, display positive role models, advance sport management and promote a culture of which sport is an important part.

An Olympian is any competitor who has competed in a Summer or Winter Olympiad. Olympians are WOA members through their local National Olympians Associations. Globally, there are over 100,000 Olympians.

IOC President Juan Antonio Samaranch created the World Olympians Association following the Centennial Olympic Congress, Congress of Unity, held in Paris in 1994. Formally, the WOA was established during a meeting held in the Olympic Museum on 21 November 1995 by 25 founder members.

In November 2011, Joël Bouzou, an Olympic medalist from France, was elected president of the association. He is the founder of Peace and Sport and the secretary general of the International Modern Pentathlon Federation (UIPM). In January 2012, Prince Albert II of Monaco was announced as patron of the association. Both the Prince and his wife Princess Charlene of Monaco are Olympians. In 2015, Russian Prime Minister Vladimir Putin and International Olympic Committee President Thomas Bach attended the World Olympians Forum in Moscow, Russia.

== OLY post-nominal letters ==
In November 2017 at the 8th International Olympic Committee (IOC) International Athletes’ Forum, the World Olympians Association announced the OLY post-nominal letters initiative. The initiative allows Olympians to use the OLY lettering on any official documentation after their name, much like when one gets a degree. The initiative is open to all athletes who have competed at the games and upholds the values and practices enshrined in the Olympic Charter and the World Olympians Association Code of Conduct. IOC president Thomas Bach was the first athlete to officially receive the initials.

== Olympians for Life ==
The Olympians for Life project was created by the World Olympians Association in partnership with the IOC Department of Culture and Heritage. It was launched during the 2016 Summer Olympics with a physical display at the Olympians Reunion Centre during the games. The project celebrates Olympians who have left a positive legacy on the world both during and after their competitive days.

== Presidents ==
People who have served as president of the Association :

Year	Name	Reference
1995—1999	Peter Montgomery	
1999—2007	Pal Schmitt	
2007—2011	Dick Fosbury	
2011—present	Joël Bouzou	

== Objectives ==
- To encourage contact between Olympians, in support of Olympism and the Olympic Movement, as set forth in the Olympic Charter.
- To educate Olympians to become good ambassadors of the Olympic Movement
- To promote the establishment of National Olympians Associations.
- To foster cooperation between National Olympians Associations, in furtherance of the objectives of the WOA
- To support and represent the interests of Olympians and contribute to the enhancement of their quality of life.
- To motivate Olympians towards active leadership in their respective local communities and countries of residence.
- To support the participation of Olympians in activities where they can serve as role models who embody the Olympic ideals.
- To implement development programs as appropriated.
