= Ireneusz Golda =

Polish hammer thrower

Personal information
- Nationality: Polish
- Born: 23 January 1955 (age 71) Sokolnik, Poland

Sport
- Sport: Athletics
- Event: Hammer throw

Ireneusz Golda (born 23 January 1955) is a Polish athlete. He competed in the men's hammer throw at the 1980 Summer Olympics. His personal best in the hammer throw was 77.96 meters in 1982.
