= Seán Egan =

Irish hammer thrower

Personal information
- Nationality: Irish
- Born: 18 October 1956 (age 69)
- Height: 187 cm (6 ft 2 in)
- Weight: 106 kg (234 lb)

Sport
- Sport: Athletics
- Event: Hammer throw
- Club: Donore Harriers

Seán Egan (born 18 October 1956) is an Irish athlete who competed at the 1980 Summer Olympics.

== Biography ==
Egan was educated in Curragh and later Kilkenny City. He broke the Irish record in 1978, throwing 65.56 metres.

He finished second behind Martin Girvan in the hammer throw event at the British 1980 AAA Championships. Shortly afterwards at the 1980 Olympics Games in Moscow, he represented Ireland in the men's hammer throw.

Egan won seven Irish hammer throw titles (1978, 1980-82, 1984, and 1986-87) before becomning a landscape contractor and wood turner in Kilmacud, Dublin.
