= Detlef Gerstenberg =

German hammer thrower

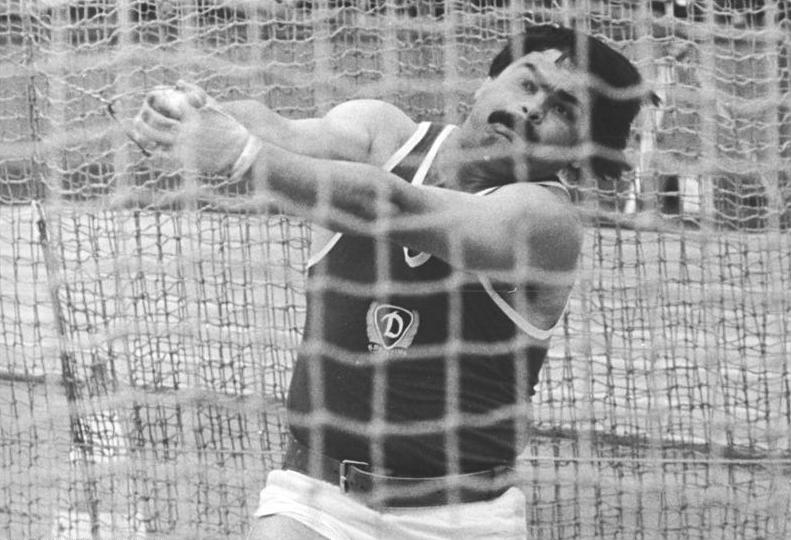
Detlef Gerstenberg on 20 May 1984 in Karl-Marx-Stadt

Detlef Gerstenberg (5 March 1957 – 24 January 1993) was a hammer thrower from East Germany, who competed at the 1980 Summer Olympics for his native country. Born in Eisenhüttenstadt, Brandenburg he died of cirrhosis aged 35 in Berlin.

== International competitions ==
Year	Competition	Venue	Position	Notes
1980	Olympic Games	Moscow, Soviet Union	5th	74.60 m
1982	European Championships	Athens, Greece	6th	75.32 m
