= Alain Cortes =

French modern pentathlete

Personal information
- Born: 7 July 1952 (age 73)

Sport
- Sport: Modern pentathlon

Alain Cortes (born 7 July 1952) is a French modern pentathlete. He competed at the 1976 and 1980 Summer Olympics.
