= Hazel Greene =

Irish archer, weightlifter and fencer

Hazel Greene-Pereira (born 19 January 1960) is an Irish archer, who has competed three times for Ireland in the Summer Olympic Games. She is also a powerlifter and fencer.

== Early life ==
Greene was born in Ballingarry and is the youngest of three children. She and her family moved to Naas when she was eight. She is a great-niece of Richard Greene.

== Archery ==
After leaving school in 1978, she took up archery. In 1979 she set five Irish records at the Kildare Open Championships.

Greene qualified for the Summer Olympic Games in 1980, 1984 and 1988. She finished nineteenth, twentieth and 38th respectively.

== Powerlifting ==
She won in her age group and weight division at the World Association of Benchpress and Deadlifting World Championships in 1997. She lifted 315 lb (143 kg) setting a WABDL record that lasted for two years.

== Fencing ==
In 2005 she began fencing and came sixth in the épée in the Veterans age group at the United States Fencing Association National Championships in 2007.
