= Manuel Montesinos =

Spanish modern pentathlete

Personal information
- Born: 27 August 1957 (age 68)

Sport
- Sport: Modern pentathlon

Manuel Montesinos (born 27 August 1957) is a Spanish modern pentathlete. He competed at the 1980 Summer Olympics.
