= George Horvath =

Swedish modern pentathlete (1960–2022)

Personal information
- Born: 14 March 1960 Danderyd, Sweden
- Died: 3 May 2022 (aged 62) Växjö, Sweden

Sport
- Sport: Modern pentathlon
Medal record
Men's modern pentathlon
Representing Sweden
Olympic Games
Bronze medal – third place	1980 Summer Olympics	Team

George Horvath (14 March 1960 – 3 May 2022) was a Swedish modern pentathlete. He competed at the 1980 Summer Olympics, winning a bronze medal in the team event.
