= Jan Olesiński =

Polish modern pentathlete

Personal information
- Born: 26 September 1956 (age 69) Stalinogród, Polish People's Republic

Sport
- Sport: Modern pentathlon

Achievements and titles
- Olympic finals: 1980 Summer Olympics
- Highest world ranking: 4th in modern pentathlon

Jan Olesiński (born 26 September 1956) is a former Polish modern pentathlete. He competed at the 1980 Summer Olympics.
