= Federico Galera (pentathlete) =

Spanish modern pentathlete

Personal information
- Full name: Federico Galera Fernández
- Born: 17 February 1953 (age 73)

Sport
- Sport: Modern pentathlon

Federico Galera Fernández (born 17 February 1953) is a retired Spanish modern pentathlete who competed at the 1980 and 1984 Summer Olympics.
