= Gyula Galovici =

Romanian modern pentathlete

Personal information
- Born: 9 March 1956 (age 70) Oradea, Romania

Sport
- Sport: Modern pentathlon

Gyula Galovici (born 9 March 1956) is a Romanian modern pentathlete. He competed at the 1980 Summer Olympics.
