= Simeon Monev =

Bulgarian modern pentathlete

Personal information
- Born: 10 July 1957 (age 68)

Sport
- Sport: Modern pentathlon

Simeon Monev (Bulgarian: Симеон Монев, born 10 July 1957) is a Bulgarian modern pentathlete. He competed at the 1980 Summer Olympics, finishing in 28th place.
