= Pekka Santanen =

Finnish modern pentathlete

Personal information
- Born: 11 May 1958 (age 68) Helsinki, Finland

Sport
- Sport: Modern pentathlon

Pekka Santanen (born 11 May 1958) is a Finnish modern pentathlete. He competed at the 1980 Summer Olympics.
