= Borislav Batikov =

Bulgarian modern pentathlete (born 1959)

Personal information
- Born: 25 May 1959 (age 67)

Sport
- Sport: Modern pentathlon

Borislav Batikov (Bulgarian: Борислав Батиков, born 25 May 1959) is a Bulgarian modern pentathlete. He competed at the 1980 Summer Olympics.
