= Cezar Răducanu =

Romanian modern pentathlete

Personal information
- Born: 21 May 1958 (age 68)

Sport
- Sport: Modern pentathlon

Cezar Răducanu (born 21 May 1958) is a Romanian modern pentathlete. He competed at the 1980 Summer Olympics, finishing in 41st place in the individual event.
