= Marek Bajan =

Polish modern pentathlete (born 1956)

Personal information
- Born: 29 July 1956 (age 69) Kraśnik, Poland

Sport
- Sport: Modern pentathlon

Marek Bajan (born 29 July 1956) is a Polish modern pentathlete. He competed at the 1980 Summer Olympics.
