= Nikolay Nikolov (pentathlete) =

Bulgarian modern pentathlete

Personal information
- Born: 4 June 1954 (age 72)

Sport
- Sport: Modern pentathlon

Nikolay Nikolov (Bulgarian: Николай Николов, born 4 June 1954) is a Bulgarian modern pentathlete. He competed at the 1976 and 1980 Summer Olympics.
