= Nigel Clark (pentathlete) =

British modern pentathlete

Personal information
- Born: 25 March 1956 (age 70)

Sport
- Sport: Modern pentathlon

Nigel Clark (born 25 March 1956) is a British modern pentathlete. He competed at the 1980 Summer Olympics where he finished 8th in the team event and 33nd in the individual event.
