= Joël Bouzou =

French modern pentathlete (born 1955)

Joël Bouzou OLY
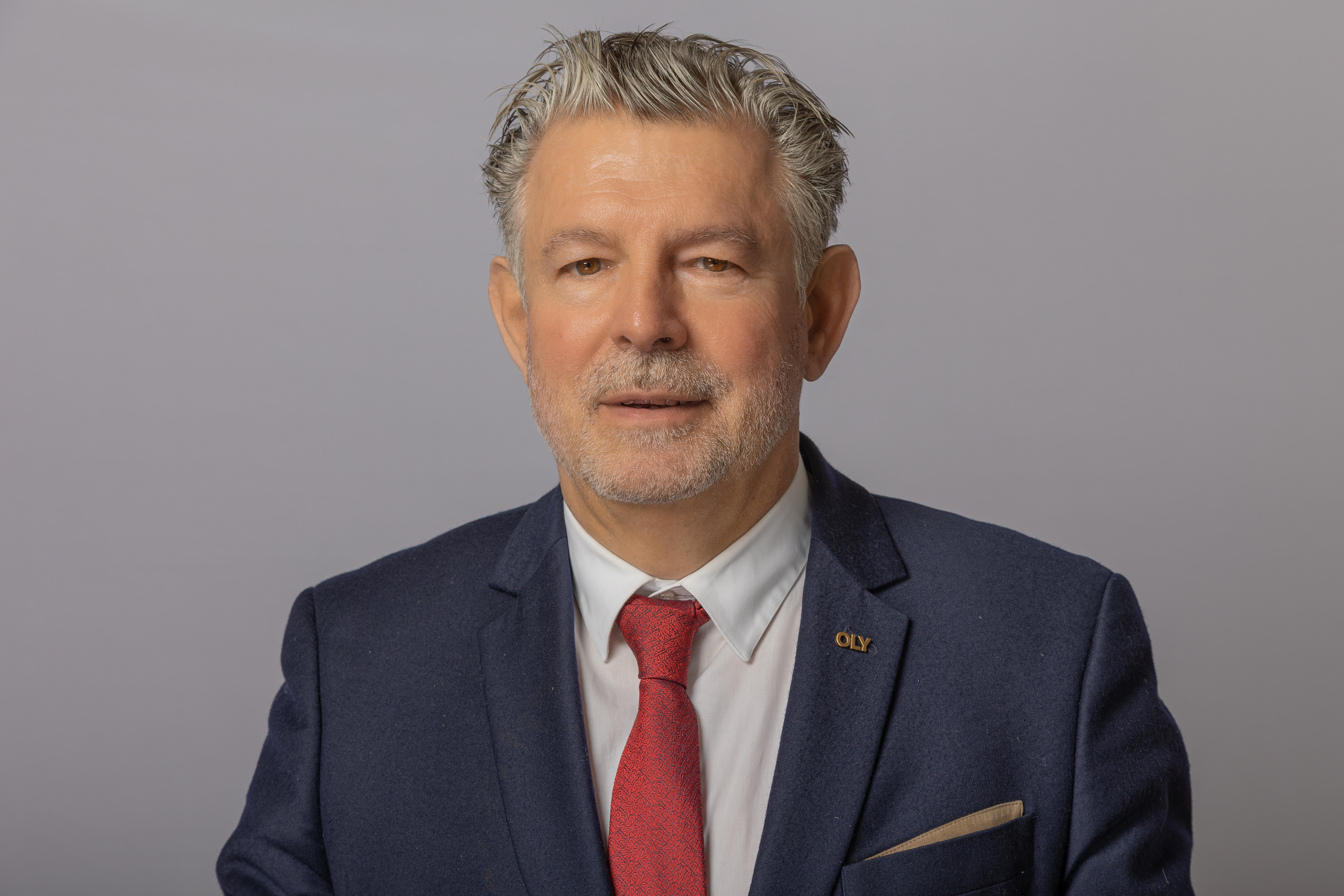
- Joël Bouzou

Personal information
- Born: 30 October 1955 (age 70) Figeac, France

Sport
- Sport: Modern pentathlon
Medal record
Men's modern pentathlon
Representing France
Olympic Games
Bronze medal – third place	1984 Los Angeles	Team

Joël Bouzou (born 30 October 1955) is a former French athlete and World Champion of modern pentathlon in 1987. Bouzou is the President of the World Olympians Association.

== Biography ==
=== Sports career ===
Bouzou grew up in Auch, in a sporting family. His father was a PE teacher and Joël participated in many different sports, so that he naturally discovered Modern Pentathlon.

He participated in four Olympic Games (Moscow 1980, Los Angeles 1984, Seoul 1988, Barcelona 1992) and won the team bronze medal in 1984. He won the Modern Pentathlon World Championships in 1987, beating Milan Kadlec. He is currently Vice-President of the Union Internationale de Pentathlon Moderne.

A member of the Executive Committee for the World Olympians Association (WOA) from 2003 to 2008, Bouzou also founded a French association Rassemblement par le Sport (Together through Sport) with the aim of helping to socially integrate young people living in volatile suburbs in France through sport.

=== Peace and sport ===
Bouzou is President and Founder of a global initiative called Peace and Sport L'Organisation pour la Paix par le Sport founded in 2007 to promote the use of sport to foster dialogue and reconciliation everywhere where it's needed.

Peace and Sport, is a neutral international organization based in the Principality of Monaco and placed under the High Patronage of H.S.H. Prince Albert II of Monaco.

=== Distinctions and other activities ===
In France, Bouzou is an Officer in The National Order of Merit and decorated with the Legion of Honour, one of the highest civil distinctions of the French Republic. He also holds the Gold Medal for Youth and Sport (in France) and the Silver Medal for Youth and Sport (in Monaco).

In March 2010 he was awarded a Honoris Causa Doctorate in Humane Letters from the University for Peace in recognition of "his unique worldwide leadership role in promoting peace and mutual understanding among different cultures, and his leadership of organizations devoted to these objectives".

He is also an advisor to H.S.H. Prince Albert II of Monaco.

In December 2011, Bouzou was elected president of the World Olympians Association on a four-year term. He was re-elected in 2015 for another four-year term unopposed. In 2020, was again re-elected as President of World Olympians Association after standing unopposed at the 2020 WOA General Assembly.

== Sports career ==
=== Olympic Games ===
- 1992, in Barcelona:
  - Individual, 17th
  - Team, 7th
- 1988, in Seoul:
  - Individual, 8th
  - Team, 4th
- 1984, in Los Angeles:
  - Individual, 17th
  - Team, Bronze Medal
- 1980, in Moscow:
  - Individual, 20th
  - Team, 5th

=== World Championships ===
- Individual
  - 1987, Gold Medal
  - 1982, Bronze Medal
- Team
  - 1983, Bronze Medal
  - 1986, Bronze Medal
