= Sackville Currie =

Irish modern pentathlete

Personal information
- Born: 28 December 1955 (age 70)

Sport
- Sport: Modern pentathlon

Sackville Currie (born 28 December 1955) is an Irish modern pentathlete. He competed at the 1980 Summer Olympics.
