= Mark Hartigan (pentathlete) =

Irish modern pentathlete

Personal information
- Born: 10 November 1955 (age 70)

Sport
- Sport: Modern pentathlon

Mark Hartigan (born 10 November 1955) is an Irish modern pentathlete. He competed at the 1980 Summer Olympics, finishing last in the individual event in 43rd place.
