= Athletics at the 1992 Summer Olympics – Men's hammer throw =

Men's hammer throw at the Games of the XXV Olympiad
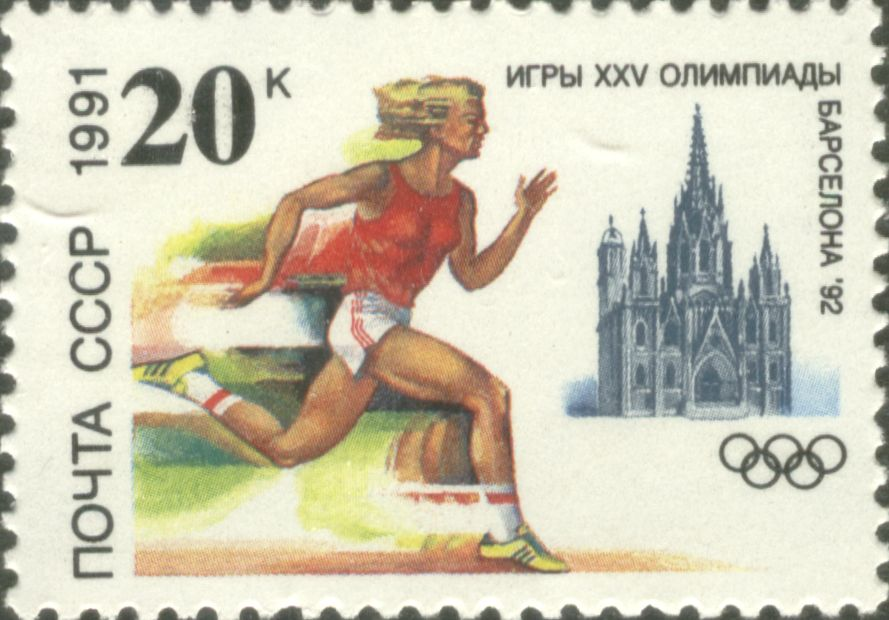
- Soviet stamp commemorating 1992 Olympic athletics
- Venue: Estadi Olímpic Lluís Companys
- Dates: August 1, 1992 (qualifying); August 2, 1992 (final)
- Competitors: 27 from 19 nations
- Winning distance: 82.54

Medalists
1st place, gold medalist(s)		Andrey Abduvaliyev; Unified Team
2nd place, silver medalist(s)		Igor Astapkovich; Unified Team
3rd place, bronze medalist(s)		Igor Nikulin; Unified Team

The men's hammer throw was an event at the 1992 Summer Olympics in Barcelona, Spain. There were 27 participating athletes from 19 nations. The maximum number of athletes per nation had been set at 3 since the 1930 Olympic Congress.

In this Olympics, the Unified Team comprised some of the republics of the former Soviet Union. Andrey Abduvaliyev from Tajikistan, Igor Astapkovich from Belarus, and Igor Nikulin from Russia created a sweep for the Unified Team. It was the fourth sweep in five Games for Soviet/Unified Team athletes; only the boycotted 1984 Games broke the consistent dominance of the Soviets.

The three dominated the competition in the late 80s and early 90s. Astapkovich, the strongest in the season, held the lead after the first round and retook it in the third. Abduvaliyev settled it with his fourth round throw 82.54 m (270 ft 9 1/2 in) while both Astapkovich and Nikulin hit their best throws in the final round, they could not match it.

== Background ==
This was the 21st appearance of the event, which has been held at every Summer Olympics except 1896. Six of the 12 finalists from the 1988 Games returned: two-time bronze medalist Jüri Tamm of the Soviet Union (now competing for independent Estonia), fifth-place finisher Heinz Weis of West Germany (now competing for united Germany), sixth-place finisher Tibor Gécsek of Hungary, eighth-place finisher Ivan Tanev of Bulgaria, tenth-place finisher Johann Lindner of Austria, and eleventh-place finisher Tore Gustafsson of Sweden. The Soviet trio that had swept the Olympic medals in both 1980 and 1988, and won the World Championships in 1983 (Sergey Litvinov), 1987 (Litvinov), and 1991 (Yuriy Sedykh), had been replaced by new throwers on the Unified Team, though Tamm continued to compete for Estonia (which was not part of the Unified Team). The new team, led by 1990 European champion Andrey Abduvaliyev, was still dominant and heavily favored.

Bahrain, the People's Republic of China, and Lithuania each made their debut in the event. Some former Soviet Republics competed as the Unified Team; others (Lithuania and Estonia, appearing independently for the first time since 1936) competed separately. The United States appeared for the 20th time, most of any nation, having missed only the boycotted 1980 Games.

== Competition format ==
The competition used the two-round format introduced in 1936, with the qualifying round completely separate from the divided final. In qualifying, each athlete received three attempts; those recording a mark of at least 76.00 metres advanced to the final. If fewer than 12 athletes achieved that distance, the top 12 would advance. The results of the qualifying round were then ignored. Finalists received three throws each, with the top eight competitors receiving an additional three attempts. The best distance among those six throws counted.

== Records ==
Prior to the competition, the existing world and Olympic records were as follows.

World record	Yuriy Sedykh (URS)	86.74	Stuttgart, West Germany	30 August 1986
Olympic record	Sergey Litvinov (URS)	84.80	Seoul, South Korea	26 September 1988

No new world or Olympic records were set during the competition.

== Schedule ==
All times are Central European Summer Time (UTC+2)

Date	Time	Round
Saturday, 1 August 1992	9:25	Qualifying
Sunday, 2 August 1992	18:55	Final

== Results ==
=== Qualifying ===
Rank	Athlete	Nation	1	2	3	Distance	Notes
1	Igor Nikulin	Unified Team	74.20	79.08	—	79.08	Q
2	Andrey Abduvaliyev	Unified Team	78.82	—	—	78.82	Q
~~3~~	Jud Logan	United States	~~78.40~~	—	—	~~78.40~~	Q, DPG
4	Jüri Tamm	Estonia	71.76	75.24	78.16	78.16	Q
5	Lance Deal	United States	X	75.58	77.00	77.00	Q
6	Igor Astapkovich	Unified Team	76.50	—	—	76.50	Q
7	Tibor Gécsek	Hungary	76.48	—	—	76.48	Q
8	Christophe Épalle	France	76.24	—	—	76.24	Q
9	Sean Carlin	Australia	74.48	74.38	75.90	75.90	q
10	Enrico Sgrulletti	Italy	75.40	75.40	X	75.40	q
11	Johann Lindner	Austria	75.28	75.24	74.02	75.28	q
12	Heinz Weis	Germany	74.86	74.64	X	74.86	q
13	Bi Zhong	China	70.66	X	74.30	74.30	
14	Savvas Saritzoglou	Greece	X	73.06	74.16	74.16	
15	Claus Dethloff	Germany	73.12	73.64	73.36	73.64	
16	Tore Gustafsson	Sweden	73.52	X	71.92	73.52	
17	Raphaël Piolanti	France	X	73.22	71.98	73.22	
18	Ivan Tanev	Bulgaria	70.20	71.16	72.62	72.62	
19	Frédéric Kuhn	France	71.20	71.76	71.64	71.76	
20	Andrés Charadia	Argentina	70.82	70.64	X	70.82	
21	Benjaminas Viluckis	Lithuania	70.54	X	70.54	70.54	
22	Plamen Minev	Bulgaria	68.78	X	69.90	69.90	
23	Paul Head	Great Britain	X	69.58	65.64	69.58	
24	Kenneth Flax	United States	69.04	X	69.36	69.36	
25	Pavel Sedláček	Czechoslovakia	67.76	64.98	67.34	67.76	
26	Waleed Al-Bekheet	Kuwait	X	X	63.94	63.94	
27	Rashid Riyadh Al-Ameeri	Bahrain	X	X	56.08	56.08	

=== Final ===
Rank	Athlete	Nation	1	2	3	4	5	6	Distance	Notes
1st place, gold medalist(s)	Andrey Abduvaliyev	Unified Team	78.56	80.18	80.34	82.54	79.12	82.24	82.54	
2nd place, silver medalist(s)	Igor Astapkovich	Unified Team	80.02	X	81.80	78.08	81.70	81.96	81.96	
3rd place, bronze medalist(s)	Igor Nikulin	Unified Team	78.46	78.56	X	78.32	80.44	81.38	81.38	
4	Tibor Gécsek	Hungary	77.78	75.78	X	75.54	X	76.58	77.78	
5	Jüri Tamm	Estonia	76.36	77.00	X	76.80	75.82	77.52	77.52	
6	Heinz Weis	Germany	76.72	X	76.90	X	75.32	76.28	76.90	
7	Lance Deal	United States	X	76.84	74.92	X	75.06	76.42	76.84	
8	Sean Carlin	Australia	75.08	76.16	75.10	Did not advance			76.16	
9	Johann Lindner	Austria	75.14	73.36	74.26	Did not advance			75.14	
10	Christophe Epalle	France	74.24	74.84	74.74	Did not advance			74.84	
11	Enrico Sgrulletti	Italy	72.98	72.34	X	Did not advance			72.98	
—	Jud Logan	United States	~~79.00~~	~~78.44~~	X	X	X	~~75.80~~	~~79.00~~	DPG

== See also ==
- 1990 Men's European Championships Hammer Throw
- 1991 Men's World Championship Hammer Throw
- 1992 Hammer Throw Year Ranking
- 1993 Men's World Championship Hammer Throw
