= 1991 World Championships in Athletics – Men's hammer throw =

These are the official results of the Men's Hammer Throw event at the 1991 World Championships in Tokyo, Japan. There were a total number of 27 participating athletes, with the final held on Sunday August 25, 1991. The qualification mark was set at 75.50 metres.

== Medalists ==
Gold	Yuriy Sedykh; Soviet Union (URS)
Silver	Igor Astapkovich; Soviet Union (URS)
Bronze	Heinz Weis; Germany (GER)

== Schedule ==
- All times are Japan Standard Time (UTC+9)

Qualification Round
Group A	Group B
24.08.1991 – 12:00h	24.08.1991 – 12:00h
Final Round
25.08.1991 – 15:00h

== Abbreviations ==
- All results shown are in metres

Q	automatic qualification
q	qualification by rank
DNS	did not start
NM	no mark
WR	world record
AR	area record
NR	national record
PB	personal best
SB	season best

== Records ==
Standing records prior to the 1991 World Athletics Championships
World Record	Yuriy Sedykh (URS)	86.74 m	August 30, 1986	Stuttgart, West Germany
Event Record	Sergey Litvinov (URS)	83.06 m	September 1, 1987	Rome, Italy
Season Best	Igor Astapkovich (URS)	84.26 m	July 3, 1991	Reims, France

== Qualification ==
=== Group A ===
Rank	Overall	Athlete	Attempts			Distance
Rank	Overall	Athlete	1	2	3	Distance
1	1	Andrey Abduvaliyev (URS)				80.36 m
2	3	Igor Astapkovich (URS)				79.06 m
3	4	Tibor Gécsek (HUN)				75.68 m
4	6	Raphaël Piolanti (FRA)				74.92 m
5	7	Sean Carlin (AUS)				74.90 m
6	10	Claus Dethloff (GER)				73.54 m
7	13	Lance Deal (USA)				72.90 m
8	15	Ivan Tanev (BUL)				72.52 m
9	16	Enrico Sgrulletti (ITA)				72.40 m
10	20	Paul Head (GBR)				68.52 m
11	23	Kjell Bystedt (SWE)				67.20 m
12	24	Guillermo Guzmán (MEX)				66.80 m
13	25	Andrés Charadia (ARG)				66.52 m

=== Group B ===
Rank	Overall	Athlete	Attempts			Distance
Rank	Overall	Athlete	1	2	3	Distance
1	2	Yuriy Sedykh (URS)				77.96 m
2	5	Plamen Minev (BUL)				75.08 m
3	8	Walter Ciofani (FRA)				74.74 m
4	9	Heinz Weis (GER)				74.40 m
5	11	Ken Flax (USA)				73.26 m
6	12	Bi Zhong (CHN)				73.24 m
7	14	Johann Lindner (AUT)				72.90 m
8	17	Imre Szitás (HUN)				71.92 m
9	18	Savvas Saritzoglou (GRE)				70.60 m
10	19	Jud Logan (USA)				70.04 m
11	21	Angus Cooper (NZL)				68.48 m
12	22	Ajet Toska (ALB)				67.26 m
13	26	Cherif El-Hennawi (EGY)				57.26 m
14	27	Tuck Yim Wong (SIN)				46.04 m

== Final ==
Rank	Athlete	Attempts						Distance
Rank	Athlete	1	2	3	4	5	6	Distance
1st place, gold medalist(s)	Yuriy Sedykh (URS)	81.38	81.70	81.06	80.26	79.28	79.94	81.70 m
2nd place, silver medalist(s)	Igor Astapkovich (URS)	77.52	79.66	X	79.70	80.94	80.90	80.94 m
3rd place, bronze medalist(s)	Heinz Weis (GER)	78.02	77.70	76.80	79.14	79.60	80.44	80.44 m
4	Tibor Gécsek (HUN)	77.30	X	75.62	77.16	78.68	78.98	78.98 m
5	Andrey Abduvaliyev (URS)	77.86	77.04	78.28	X	78.30	77.86	78.30 m
6	Walter Ciofani (FRA)	X	74.46	76.48	75.68	75.68	X	76.48 m
7	Ken Flax (USA)	75.68	75.36	X	75.98	75.34	X	75.98 m
8	Raphaël Piolanti (FRA)	72.78	72.24	73.64	X	72.08	73.44	73.64 m
9	Sean Carlin (AUS)							73.24 m
10	Claus Dethloff (GER)							72.96 m
11	Bi Zhong (CHN)							69.50 m
12	Plamen Minev (BUL)							68.70 m

== See also ==
- 1988 Men's Olympic Hammer Throw (Seoul)
- 1990 Men's European Championships Hammer Throw (Split)
- 1992 Men's Olympic Hammer Throw (Barcelona)
