= Athletics at the 1982 Commonwealth Games – Men's hammer throw =

Men's hammer throw at the Commonwealth Games

The men's hammer throw event at the 1982 Commonwealth Games was held on 3 October at the QE II Stadium in Brisbane, Australia.

== Results ==
Rank	Name	Nationality	#1	#2	#3	#4	#5	#6	Result	Notes
1st place, gold medalist(s)	Robert Weir	England	70.02	73.52	75.08				75.08	GR
2nd place, silver medalist(s)	Martin Girvan	Northern Ireland	73.58	73.62					73.62	
3rd place, bronze medalist(s)	Chris Black	Scotland							69.84	
4	Hans Lotz	Australia							68.82	
5	Derek Dickenson	England							67.96	
6	Harold Willers	Canada							65.06	
7	Phil Spivey	Australia							63.62	
8	Gus Puopolo	Australia							59.74	
9	Michael Lambourne	Zimbabwe							50.66	
10	Cornelius Kemboi	Kenya							43.64	
