= Athletics at the 1986 Commonwealth Games – Men's hammer throw =

Men's hammer throw at the Commonwealth Games

The men's hammer throw event at the 1986 Commonwealth Games was held on 26 July at the Meadowbank Stadium in Edinburgh.

== Results ==
Rank	Name	Nationality	#1	#2	#3	#4	#5	#6	Result	Notes
1st place, gold medalist(s)	Dave Smith	England	72.11	68.90	73.60	72.60	74.06		74.06	
2nd place, silver medalist(s)	Martin Girvan	Northern Ireland	x	x	65.24	70.48	69.98	x	70.48	
3rd place, bronze medalist(s)	Phil Spivey	Australia	x	63.90	x	69.22	x	70.30	70.30	
4	Mick Jones	England	68.96	x	70.10	69.14	69.46		70.10	PB
5	Joe Quigley	Australia	65.12	65.76	x				69.30	
6	Matt Mileham	England	65.86	67.94	67.88	x	x	67.96	67.96	
7	Hans Lotz	Australia	62.40	65.20	61.88	62.90	64.96	66.14	66.14	
8	Chris Black	Scotland	62.48	62.90	63.28	63.88	63.72		63.88	
9	Shaun Pickering	Wales	62.32	62.64	61.92				62.64	
