= Athletics at the 1998 Commonwealth Games – Men's hammer throw =

Men's Hammer Throw at the 1998 Commonwealth Games, Kuala Lumpur

Men's hammer throw at the Commonwealth Games

The men's hammer throw event at the 1998 Commonwealth Games was held on 18 September in Kuala Lumpur.

== Results ==
Rank	Name	Nationality	#1	#2	#3	#4	#5	#6	Result	Notes
1st place, gold medalist(s)	Stuart Rendell	Australia	72.52	74.37	x	74.33	x	74.71	74.71	
2nd place, silver medalist(s)	Mick Jones	England	72.58	73.51	74.02				74.02	PB
3rd place, bronze medalist(s)	Chris Harmse	South Africa							72.83	
4	Paul Head	England	66.89	68.00	70.36				70.36	
5	Dave Smith	England							69.77	
6	Philip Jensen	New Zealand							69.63	
7	John Stoikos	Canada							65.07	
8	Steve Whyte	Scotland							61.57	
9	Stéphane Tolbize	Mauritius							55.37	
10	Brentt Jones	Norfolk Island							53.80	
11	Wong Tee Kue	Malaysia							53.06	
