= Athletics at the 1990 Commonwealth Games – Men's hammer throw =

Men's hammer throw at the Commonwealth Games

The men's hammer throw event at the 1990 Commonwealth Games was held on 27 January at the Mount Smart Stadium in Auckland.

== Results ==
Rank	Name	Nationality	#1	#2	#3	#4	#5	#6	Result	Notes
1st place, gold medalist(s)	Sean Carlin	Australia	x	x	70.70	x	69.80	75.66	75.66	GR
2nd place, silver medalist(s)	Dave Smith	England	70.92	72.74	68.88	73.52	x	71.18	73.52	
3rd place, bronze medalist(s)	Angus Cooper	New Zealand	63.36	x	71.26	x	69.84	70.90	71.26	
4	Phil Spivey	Australia							70.74	
5	Philip Jensen	New Zealand	x	64.06	68.96	66.26			68.96	
6	Paul Head	England	68.14	67.54					68.14	
7	Peter Baxevanis	Australia							68.06	
8	Shane Peacock	England							66.74	
9	Ian Maplethorpe	Canada							60.62	
10	Steve Whyte	Scotland							60.48	
11	Darren McFee	Canada							57.76	
