= Jim Driscoll (hammer thrower) =

American track and field athlete

Personal information
- Born: 15 August 1965 (age 60) Eugene, Oregon, United States

Sport
- Sport: Track and field
Medal record
Representing United States
Pan American Games
Gold medal – first place	1991 Havana	Hammer throw

James Driscoll (born 15 August 1965) is an American former track and field athlete who competed in the hammer throw. Driscoll represented the United States at the 1993 World Championships in Athletics, taking part in the qualifying round only. He set a personal record of 74.58 m (244 ft 8 in) in 1992 in New Orleans.

Driscoll competed for the Yale Bulldogs track and field team in the NCAA, where he set the school record in the hammer throw.

He was the gold medalist at the 1991 Pan American Games, having a winning mark of 72.78 m (238 ft 9 1/4 in). He returned to the competition four years later but failed to defend his title, finishing in sixth place. At national level, he was runner-up for two years running at the USA Outdoor Track and Field Championships in 1993 and 1994. He regularly finished fourth at the national championships, doing so in 1989 to 1992 and again in 1995.

After retiring in 1996 he moved on to throws coaching, training young athletes in Corona del Mar. He lives with his wife Jane Buchan in Newport Coast, California.

== International competitions ==
Year	Competition	Venue	Position	Event	Notes
1991	Pan American Games	Havana, Cuba	1st	Hammer throw	72.78 m
1993	World Championships	Stuttgart, Germany	12th (q)	Hammer throw	69.40 m
1995	Pan American Games	Mar de Plata, Argentina	6th	Hammer throw	68.38 m
