= Phil Spivey =

Australian hammer thrower

Phillip Spivey
Personal information
- Born: 15 May 1961 (age 65)

Sport
- Sport: Athletics
- Event: Hammer Throw
- Club: Keilor-St. Bernards Athletics Club

Phillip Spivey (born 15 May 1961) is a retired Australian hammer thrower.

Phil Spivey started training for Hammer Throw in 1978, under the guidance of his long-term coach, Gus Puopolo. He represented the Victoria Athletics team at both School and Open competitions in the junior ranks between 1978 and 1981.

He was Australian Junior Hammer Throw Champion in 1979 & 1980 and finished second in 1978 & 1981. In each of these competitions he had an epic battle with New South Wales' Andrew Heyes; trading the Gold and Silver medals between them over the four-year period.

Phil Spivey was also the Australian All-Schools Hammer Throw champion in 1978 and 1979.

At a senior level, Phil Spivey competed for Victoria Athletics at the Australian National Championships. (1982-1990). Although he never became the Australian senior champion, he finished in the top three at each national championship. His main competitors were Hans Lotz, Joe Quigley and Sean Carlin. Phil's personal best throw was 70.94 metres, achieved in July 1986 in an International match (Australia v England v Belgium) Hechtel,

Phil Spivey competed in three Commonwealth Games, three international matches and one Pacific Conference Games for Australia as well as in two World Cups, where he represented Oceania.

1981 - Pacific Conference Games (Christchurch, NZ). 5th place. (His coach, Gus Puopolo, was also selected to compete in the Hammer Throw, finishing 3rd.)

1982 - Commonwealth Games (Brisbane, Australia) 7th place. (His coach, Gus Puopolo, was also selected to compete in the Hammer Throw, finishing 8th.)

1986 - Commonwealth Games (Edinburgh, Scotland) 3rd place. 1986 Commonwealth Games,

1986 - "Rest of the Commonwealth" International match in Newcastle (UK), (Select Commonwealth team v Great Britain). 3rd place

1989 - World Cup (Barcelona, Spain) 6th place 1989 World Cup

1990 - Commonwealth Games (Auckland, New Zealand) 4th place. 1990 Commonwealth Games,

1992 - World Cup (Havana, Cuba) 8th place. 1992 World Cup
