= Mick Jones (hammer thrower) =

English hammer thrower (born 1963)

Personal information
- Born: 23 July 1963 (age 62) London, England
- Height: 187 cm (6 ft 2 in)
- Weight: 119 kg (262 lb)

Sport
- Sport: Athletics
- Event: Hammer throw
- Club: Shaftesbury Barnet Harriers
Medal record
Athletics
Representing England
Commonwealth Games
Silver medal – second place	1998 Kuala Lumpur	hammer
Gold medal – first place	2002 Manchester	hammer

Michael David Jones (born 23 July 1963) is an English retired athlete who competed in the hammer throw and competed at the 1988 Summer Olympics.

== Biography ==
Jones represented Great Britain at the 1988 Olympic Games in Seoul, finishing in 22nd place.

He appeared at five Commonwealth Games. He represented England at the 1986 Commonwealth Games in Edinburgh, Scotland and eight years later represented England, at the 1994 Commonwealth Games in Victoria, Canada. A third games appearance ensued representing England, at the 1998 Commonwealth Games in Kuala Lumpur, Malaysia, where he won a silver medal in the hammer. Four years later he won the gold medal at the 2002 Commonwealth Games in Manchester, beating New Zealand's Philip Jensen before finishing in fifth place at the 2006 Commonwealth Games.

Jones competed in British athletics for over 20 years and captained the Great Britain team to victories in the European Cup. He is the all-time fourth-farthest British thrower in the hammer.

Jones was eight-times British hammer throw champion having won the AAA Championships title six times in 1998, 1999, 2000, 2001, 2002 and 2004 and being the highest placed British athlete in 1991 and 1995.

== Achievements ==
Year	Competition	Venue	Position	Notes
Representing Great Britain and England
1986	Commonwealth Games	Edinburgh, United Kingdom	4th	70.10 m
1988	Olympic Games	Seoul, South Korea	22nd (q)	70.38 m
1994	Commonwealth Games	Victoria, Canada	4th	68.42 m
1998	Commonwealth Games	Kuala Lumpur, Malaysia	2nd	74.02 m
2001	World Championships	Edmonton, Canada	27th (q)	73.31 m
2002	Commonwealth Games	Manchester, United Kingdom	1st	72.55 m
2006	Commonwealth Games	Melbourne, Australia	5th	70.09 m
