= Mayho =

Mayho is a surname. Notable people with this surname include:

- Dominique Mayho (born 1993), Bermudian cyclist
- Hannah Mayho (born 1990), English cyclist
- Jessica Mayho (born 1993), English athlete
