= 1990 World Junior Championships in Athletics – Men's hammer throw =

The men's hammer throw event at the 1990 World Junior Championships in Athletics was held in Plovdiv, Bulgaria, at Deveti Septemvri Stadium on 11 August. A 7257g (senior implement) hammer was used.

== Medalists ==
Gold	Andrey Debeliy; Soviet Union
Silver	Savvas Saritzoglou; Greece
Bronze	Andrey Budykin; Soviet Union

== Results ==
=== Final ===
11 August

Rank	Name	Nationality	Attempts						Result	Notes
Rank	Name	Nationality	1	2	3	4	5	6	Result	Notes
1st place, gold medalist(s)	Andrey Debeliy	Soviet Union	67.62	68.02	x	63.60	65.72	70.60	70.60	
2nd place, silver medalist(s)	Savvas Saritzoglou	Greece	67.68	69.44	x	68.84	70.32	x	70.32	
3rd place, bronze medalist(s)	Andrey Budykin	Soviet Union	66.40	x	68.08	68.94	69.10	69.36	69.36	
4	Karsten Kobs	West Germany	65.54	x	x	65.64	60.54	67.66	67.66	
5	Kai Maybach	West Germany	65.10	65.52	62.88	x	66.32	67.24	67.24	
6	Zsolt Németh	Hungary	64.00	x	x	63.02	62.12	63.22	64.00	
7	Jürgen Rückborn	East Germany	61.22	62.60	x	58.46	59.80	x	62.60	
8	David Chaussinand	France	x	59.58	62.38	x	62.16	x	62.38	
9	Hristos Polyhroníou	Greece	61.42	57.88	60.74				61.42	
10	Sherif El-Hennawi	Egypt	58.42	x	60.00				60.00	
11	José Almudi	Spain	56.62	x	56.20				56.62	
12	Altin Bello	Albania	x	56.34	x				56.34	
13	Alban Shehri	Albania	51.36	55.72	x				55.72	

== Participation ==
According to an unofficial count, 13 athletes from 9 countries participated in the event.

- Albania (2)
- East Germany (1)
- Egypt (1)
- France (1)
- Greece (2)
- Hungary (1)
- Soviet Union (2)
- Spain (1)
- West Germany (2)
