= Athletics at the 1989 Summer Universiade – Men's hammer throw =

The men's hammer throw event at the 1989 Summer Universiade was held at the Wedaustadion in Duisburg on 25 August 1989.

== Results ==
Rank	Athlete	Nationality	Result	Notes
1st place, gold medalist(s)	Igor Astapkovich	Soviet Union	80.56	GR
2nd place, silver medalist(s)	Heinz Weis	West Germany	79.58	
3rd place, bronze medalist(s)	Ken Flax	United States	75.86	
4	Valeriy Gubkin	Soviet Union	73.96	
5	Michael Beierl	Austria	70.54	
6	Lucio Serrani	Italy	68.20	
7	Lasse Akselin	Finland	68.16	
8	Stefan Jönsson	Sweden	68.04	
9	Shane Peacock	Great Britain	67.58	
10	Hakim Toumi	Algeria	66.94	
11	Giorgios Naltzatziadis	Greece	66.92	
12	Oliver Sack	Switzerland	62.78	
13	Antón María Godall	Spain	62.02	
14	John O'Connor	United States	61.88	
15	Guillermo Guzmán	Mexico	58.80	
16	Murat Elgin	Turkey	58.46	
	Plamen Minev	Bulgaria	NM	
