= Athletics at the 1995 Pan American Games – Men's hammer throw =

Men's hammer throw at the Pan American Games

The men's hammer throw event at the 1995 Pan American Games was held at the Estadio Atletico "Justo Roman" on 25 March.

== Results ==
Rank	Name	Nationality	#1	#2	#3	#4	#5	#6	Result	Notes
1st place, gold medalist(s)	Lance Deal	United States	73.54	72.94	74.70	75.64	74.70	x	75.64	
2nd place, silver medalist(s)	Alberto Sánchez	Cuba	72.88	73.28	x	73.94	73.64	x	73.94	
3rd place, bronze medalist(s)	Andrés Charadía	Argentina	68.20	70.58	71.70	68.18	71.78	70.28	71.78	
4	Yosvany Suárez	Cuba	68.76	70.92	68.30	x	70.84	71.44	71.44	
5	Guillermo Guzmán	Mexico	69.84	x	67.46	66.26	66.44	68.18	69.84	
6	James Driscoll	United States	68.38	67.54	67.10	64.96	64.76	67.94	68.38	
7	Adrián Marzo	Argentina	66.36	66.38	65.62	x	65.84	x	66.38	
	Pedro da Silva	Brazil							DNF	
