= Athletics at the 2006 Commonwealth Games – Men's hammer throw =

Men's hammer throw at the Commonwealth Games

The men's hammer throw event at the 2006 Commonwealth Games was held on March 24.

== Results ==
Rank	Athlete	Nationality	#1	#2	#3	#4	#5	#6	Result	Notes
1st place, gold medalist(s)	Stuart Rendell	Australia	70.00	77.53	x	x	x	x	77.53	GR
2nd place, silver medalist(s)	James Steacy	Canada	73.18	71.27	71.61	69.36	71.78	74.75	74.75	
3rd place, bronze medalist(s)	Chris Harmse	South Africa	71.99	71.60	73.08	71.26	73.81	73.05	73.81	
4	Andrew Frost	England	69.90	72.62	x	72.17	70.18	x	72.62	PB
5	Michael Jones	England	69.42	70.09	69.33	x	68.74	38.55	70.09	
6	Simon Bown	England	63.35	63.19	65.42	65.30	65.21	63.60	65.42	
7	Derek Woodske	Canada	62.29	x	64.40	x	64.42	x	64.42	
8	Osazuwa Osamudiame	Nigeria	60.37	60.55	60.50	x	62.71	59.48	62.71	SB
9	Petros Sofianos	Cyprus	59.79	57.72	59.36				59.79	
10	Iain Park	Scotland	59.00	57.20	x				59.00	
11	Faleono Seve	Samoa	52.63	51.07	52.63				52.63	
12	Petros Mitsides	Cyprus	49.87	52.58	x				52.58	
13	Michael Letterlough	Cayman Islands	47.56	x	x				47.56	
