= 1993 World Championships in Athletics – Men's hammer throw =

These are the official results of the Men's Hammer Throw event at the 1993 World Championships in Stuttgart, Germany. There were a total of 28 participating athletes, with the final held on Sunday August 15, 1993. The qualification mark was set at 77.00 metres.

== Medalists ==
Gold	Andrey Abduvaliyev; Tajikistan (TJK)
Silver	Igor Astapkovich; Belarus (BLR)
Bronze	Tibor Gécsek; Hungary (HUN)

== Schedule ==
- All times are Central European Time (UTC+1)

Qualification Round
Group A	Group B
14.08.1993 – 11:00h	14.08.1993 – 12:45h
Final Round
15.08.1993 – 16:20h

== Abbreviations ==
- All results shown are in metres

Q	automatic qualification
q	qualification by rank
DNS	did not start
NM	no mark
WR	world record
AR	area record
NR	national record
PB	personal best
SB	season best

== Records ==
Standing records prior to the 1993 World Athletics Championships
World Record	Yuriy Sedykh (URS)	86.74 m	August 30, 1986	Stuttgart, West Germany
Event Record	Sergey Litvinov (URS)	83.06 m	September 1, 1987	Rome, Italy
Season Best	Sergey Kirmasov (RUS)	82.54 m	May 22, 1993	Sochi, Russia

== Qualification ==
=== Group A ===
Rank	Overall	Athlete	Attempts			Distance
Rank	Overall	Athlete	1	2	3	Distance
1	3	Andrey Abduvaliyev (TJK)				77.22 m
2	5	Aleksandr Seleznyov (RUS)				77.12 m
3	7	Andriy Skvaruk (UKR)				75.54 m
4	8	Raphaël Piolanti (FRA)				75.34 m
5	9	Sergey Alay (BLR)				75.34 m
6	11	Vasiliy Sidorenko (RUS)				74.40 m
7	13	Pavel Sedláček (CZE)				73.90 m
8	15	Tore Gustafsson (SWE)				71.88 m
9	16	Karsten Kobs (GER)				71.82 m
10	17	Savvas Saritzoglou (GRE)				71.76 m
11	18	Johann Lindner (AUT)				71.46 m
12	21	Jim Driscoll (USA)				69.40 m
13	22	Paul Head (GBR)				68.88 m
14	28	Tuck Yim Wong (SIN)				49.14 m

=== Group B ===
Rank	Overall	Athlete	Attempts			Distance
Rank	Overall	Athlete	1	2	3	Distance
1	1	Sergey Litvinov (RUS)				77.96 m
2	2	Tibor Gécsek (HUN)				77.82 m
3	4	Lance Deal (USA)				77.14 m
4	6	Igor Astapkovich (BLR)				76.82 m
5	10	Christophe Épalle (FRA)				74.74 m
6	12	Vadim Kolesnik (UKR)				74.36 m
7	14	Walter Ciofani (FRA)				73.36 m
8	19	Alberto Sanchez (CUB)				71.00 m
9	20	Marko Wahlman (FIN)				69.62 m
10	23	Andrés Charadia (ARG)				68.48 m
11	24	Iosif Shaverdashvili (GEO)				68.26 m
12	25	Guillermo Guzmán (MEX)				67.30 m
13	26	Hakim Toumi (ALG)				66.16 m
14	27	Enrico Sgrulletti (ITA)				63.58 m

== Final ==
Rank	Athlete	Attempts						Distance
Rank	Athlete	1	2	3	4	5	6	Distance
1st place, gold medalist(s)	Andrey Abduvaliyev (TJK)	78.08	X	78.02	81.64	X	80.56	81.64 m
2nd place, silver medalist(s)	Igor Astapkovich (BLR)	77.54	X	X	79.88	79.48	79.16	79.88 m
3rd place, bronze medalist(s)	Tibor Gécsek (HUN)	73.34	X	76.80	79.54	73.84	X	79.54 m
4	Sergey Alay (BLR)	71.42	76.56	77.12	X	77.40	79.02	79.02 m
5	Vasiliy Sidorenko (RUS)	X	76.82	76.62	77.12	78.86	77.36	78.86 m
6	Aleksandr Seleznyov (RUS)	76.48	78.58	76.34	X	X	75.28	78.58 m
7	Sergey Litvinov (RUS)	78.56	X	X	75.02	76.56	X	78.56 m
8	Christophe Épalle (FRA)	76.22	X	75.90	X	X	75.04	76.22 m
9	Lance Deal (USA)							76.20 m
10	Raphaël Piolanti (FRA)							75.88 m
11	Vadim Kolesnik (UKR)							73.08 m
—	Andriy Skvaruk (UKR)	X	X	X				NM

== See also ==
- 1992 Men's Olympic Hammer Throw
- 1993 Hammer Throw Year Ranking
