= Athletics at the 1994 Commonwealth Games – Men's hammer throw =

Men's hammer throw at the Commonwealth Games

The men's hammer throw event at the 1994 Commonwealth Games was held at the Centennial Stadium in Victoria, British Columbia.

== Results ==
Rank	Name	Nationality	#1	#2	#3	#4	#5	#6	Result	Notes
1st place, gold medalist(s)	Sean Carlin	Australia	68.62	70.24	73.48	x	x		73.48	
2nd place, silver medalist(s)	Paul Head	England	70.18	x			x		70.18	
3rd place, bronze medalist(s)	Peter Vivian	England	x	x	64.30	69.80			69.80	
4	Mick Jones	England	65.50	62.90	66.06	x	66.24	68.42	68.42	
5	Angus Cooper	New Zealand	65.80	x	67.92				67.92	
6	Boris Stoikos	Canada							65.84	
7	John Stoikos	Canada	63.44	x					64.62	
8	Demetri Dionisopoulos	Australia	x	63.52	x	x			63.52	
9	Stephen Whyte	Scotland			63.36				63.36	
10	Ian Maplethorpe	Canada	62.76	62.70	62.18				62.76	
11	Russell Devine	Scotland	x						61.90	
	Paul Carlin	Australia	x	x	x				NM	
