= Radefeld =

Radefeld may refer to:

- Norbert Radefeld, West German hammer thrower
- Radefeld, the German name for Radziszewo, Goleniów County
