= James Stallworth (athlete) =

American track and field athlete (born 1971)

Personal information
- Born: April 29, 1971 (age 55)
Medal record
Men's Athletics
Representing United States
World Junior Championships
Gold medal – first place	1990 Plovdiv	Long Jump
Gold medal – first place	1990 Plovdiv	4x100m relay
Bronze medal – third place	1990 Plovdiv	200 m

James Stallworth (born April 29, 1971) is a retired American track and field athlete, primarily known for the long jump. He holds the NFHS High School Record for the long jump, with a jump of 8.04 metres (26.4 ft) set while winning the CIF California State High School Championships in Norwalk, California on June 3, 1989. Stallworth attended Tulare Union High School, the same high school as two time Olympic Decathlon champion Bob Mathias and Discus Gold Medalist Sim Iness.

Continuing his junior career, he won the USATF Junior Championships in 1990, setting a meet record of 8.17 metres (26.8 ft) which qualified him for the International team. He was also Junior National Champion at 200 meters. In Plovdiv, Bulgaria, he won the 1990 World Junior Championships in Athletics, setting a personal best of 8.20 metres (26.9 ft) in the qualifying round, the # 152performance on the world all-time list. He also won a Bronze medal in the 200 meters in that same competition. In 1991, as a 20-year-old, he placed second behind Mike Powell in the United States Olympic Festival.

After a 9-year absence from competition Stallworth returned to competition in 2000. He achieved a 7.93 metres (26.0 ft) long jump in a local championship in Long Beach, California. but did not make the Olympic team.

As of 2017, Stallworth was working as a warehouse worker at a Rescue Mission.
