= Peter Vivian =

British

Personal information
- Nationality: British (English)
- Born: 5 November 1970 (age 55) Hillingdon, London, England
- Height: 5 ft 11 in (180 cm)
- Weight: 95 kg (209 lb)

Sport
- Sport: Athletics
- Event: Hammer throw
- Club: Thames Valley Harriers
Medal record
Athletics
Representing England
Commonwealth Games
Bronze medal – third place	1994 Victoria	hammer

Peter John Philip Vivian (born 5 November 1970) is a retired English hammer thrower.

== Biography ==
Vivian represented England and won a bronze medal, at the 1994 Commonwealth Games in Victoria, Canada.

He also competed at the 1995 World Championships without reaching the final.

Vivian became the British hammer throw champion after winning the British AAA Championships title at the 1994 AAA Championships.

His personal best throw was 71.28 metres, achieved in June 1995 in Villeneuve d'Ascq.
