= Andrés Charadía =

Argentine hammer thrower

Personal information
- Born: July 10, 1966 (age 59) Urdinarrain, Entre Rios, Argentina

Sport
- Sport: Track and field
Medal record
Representing Argentina
Pan American Games
Silver medal – second place	1987 Indianapolis	Hammer throw
Bronze medal – third place	1995 Mar del Plata	Hammer throw
South American Games
Gold medal – first place	1990 Lima	Hammer throw
Gold medal – first place	1994 Valencia	Hammer throw
Silver medal – second place	1990 Lima	Discus throw
Silver medal – second place	1990 Lima	Shot put

Andrés Charadia Alfieri (born July 10, 1966) is a retired male hammer thrower from Argentina, who represented his native country three times in the men's hammer throw event at the Summer Olympics, starting in 1988. He set his personal best (74.66 metres) on October 9, 1994, at a meet in Cordoba, Argentina.

== International competitions ==
Year	Competition	Venue	Position	Event	Notes
Representing Argentina
1985	South American Junior Championships	Santa Fe, Argentina	2nd	Hammer	58.48 m
1986	Ibero-American Championships	La Habana, Cuba	5th	Hammer	59.20 m
1986	South American Games	Santiago, Chile	1st	Hammer	62.72 m
1987	Pan American Games	Indianapolis, United States	10th	Discus	46.61 m
1987	Pan American Games	Indianapolis, United States	2nd	Hammer	69.36 m
1987	World Championships	Rome, Italy	24th (q)	Hammer	63.70 m
1987	South American Championships	São Paulo, Brazil	1st	Hammer	66.72 m
1988	Ibero-American Championships	Mexico City, Mexico	1st	Hammer	68.46 m A
1988	Olympic Games	Seoul, South Korea	25th (q)	Hammer	68.26 m
1989	South American Championships	Medellín, Colombia	4th	Shot put	15.63 m
1989	South American Championships	Medellín, Colombia	7th	Discus	45.80 m
1989	South American Championships	Medellín, Colombia	2nd	Hammer	65.56 m
1990	Ibero-American Championships	Manaus, Brazil	6th	Shot put	15.01 m
1990	Ibero-American Championships	Manaus, Brazil	5th	Discus	51.54 m
1990	Ibero-American Championships	Manaus, Brazil	1st	Hammer	68.98 m
1990	South American Games	Lima, Peru	2nd	Shot put	15.24 m
1990	South American Games	Lima, Peru	2nd	Discus	47.10 m
1990	South American Games	Lima, Peru	1st	Hammer	69.94 m
1991	South American Championships	Manaus, Brazil	5th	Shot put	15.14 m
1991	South American Championships	Manaus, Brazil	5th	Discus	47.44 m
1991	South American Championships	Manaus, Brazil	2nd	Hammer	62.88 m
1991	Pan American Games	Havana, Cuba	5th	Hammer	68.22 m
1991	World Championships	Tokyo, Japan	25th (q)	Hammer	66.52 m
1992	Ibero-American Championships	Seville, Spain	2nd	Hammer	69.38 m
1992	Olympic Games	Barcelona, Spain	20th (q)	Hammer	70.82 m
1992	World Cup	Havana, Cuba	5th	Hammer	71.62 m^{1}
1993	South American Championships	Lima, Peru	4th	Shot put	16.03 m
1993	South American Championships	Lima, Peru	1st	Hammer	71.14 m
1993	World Championships	Stuttgart, Germany	23rd (q)	Hammer	68.48 m
1994	Ibero-American Championships	Mar del Plata, Argentina	—	Shot put	NM
1994	Ibero-American Championships	Mar del Plata, Argentina	1st	Hammer	70.80 m
1994	South American Games	Valencia, Venezuela	1st	Hammer	70.80 m
1995	Pan American Games	Mar del Plata, Argentina	3rd	Hammer	71.78 m
1995	South American Championships	Manaus, Brazil	1st	Hammer	70.34 m
1995	World Championships	Gothenburg, Sweden	37th (q)	Hammer	66.34 m
1996	Ibero-American Championships	Mexico City, Mexico	4th	Hammer	67.94 m
1996	Olympic Games	Atlanta, United States	35th (q)	Hammer	65.26 m

^{1}Representing the Americas
