= 1990 European Athletics Championships – Men's hammer throw =

Men's hammer throw at the European Athletics Championships

These are the official results of the Men's Hammer Throw event at the 1990 European Championships in Split, Yugoslavia, held at Stadion Poljud on 30 and 31 August 1990. There were a total number of twenty participating athletes.

The winning margin was four metres exactly. This is the greatest winning margin for the men's hammer throw at these championships and the only time the event was won by more than three metres.

== Medalists ==
| Gold | Igor Astapkovich; Soviet Union (URS) |
| Silver | Tibor Gécsek; Hungary (URS) |
| Bronze | Igor Nikulin; Soviet Union (URS) |

== Abbreviations ==
- All results shown are in metres

| Q | automatic qualification |
| q | qualification by rank |
| DNS | did not start |
| NM | no mark |
| WR | world record |
| AR | area record |
| NR | national record |
| PB | personal best |
| SB | season best |

== Records ==
Standing records prior to the 1990 European Athletics Championships
| World Record | Yuriy Sedykh (URS) | 86.74 m | August 30, 1986 | Stuttgart, West Germany |
| Event Record | Yuriy Sedykh (URS) | 86.74 m | August 30, 1986 | Stuttgart, West Germany |

== Qualification ==
=== Group A ===
| Rank | Overall | Athlete | Attempts | | | Distance |
| Rank | Overall | Athlete | 1 | 2 | 3 | Distance |
|---|---|---|---|---|---|---|
| 1 | 1 | Igor Nikulin (URS) | | | | 79.06 m |
| 2 | 4 | Enrico Sgrulletti (ITA) | | | | 76.68 m |
| 3 | 7 | Ivan Tanev (BUL) | | | | 74.48 m |
| 4 | 10 | Johann Lindner (AUT) | | | | 74.00 m |
| 5 | 11 | Heinz Weis (FRG) | | | | 73.44 m |
| 6 | 13 | Tore Gustafsson (SWE) | | | | 72.86 m |
| 7 | 14 | Raphaël Piolanti (FRA) | | | | 72.50 m |
| 8 | 15 | József Vida (HUN) | | | | 72.46 m |
| 9 | 16 | Norbert Radefeld (FRG) | | | | 72.42 m |
| 10 | 17 | Esa Jantunen (FIN) | | | | 71.60 m |
| 11 | 19 | Viktor Apostolov (BUL) | | | | 68.92 m |

=== Group B ===
| Rank | Overall | Athlete | Attempts | | | Distance |
| Rank | Overall | Athlete | 1 | 2 | 3 | Distance |
|---|---|---|---|---|---|---|
| 1 | 2 | Plamen Minev (BUL) | | | | 77.80 m |
| 2 | 3 | Igor Astapkovich (URS) | | | | 77.60 m |
| 3 | 5 | Günther Rodehau (GDR) | | | | 75.36 m |
| 4 | 6 | Tibor Gécsek (HUN) | | | | 74.68 m |
| 5 | 8 | Juha Tiainen (FIN) | | | | 74.30 m |
| 6 | 9 | Paul Head (GBR) | | | | 74.02 m |
| 7 | 12 | Claus Dethloff (FRG) | | | | 73.12 m |
| 8 | 18 | Frédéric Kuhn (FRA) | | | | 71.30 m |
| 9 | 20 | Giuliano Zanello (ITA) | | | | 68.64 m |

== Final ==
| Rank | Athlete | Attempts | | | | | | Distance | Note |
| Rank | Athlete | 1 | 2 | 3 | 4 | 5 | 6 | Distance | Note |
|---|---|---|---|---|---|---|---|---|---|
| 1st place, gold medalist(s) | Igor Astapkovich (URS) | | | | | | | 84.14 m | |
| 2nd place, silver medalist(s) | Tibor Gécsek (HUN) | | | | | | | 80.14 m | |
| 3rd place, bronze medalist(s) | Igor Nikulin (URS) | | | | | | | 80.02 m | |
| 4 | Günther Rodehau (GDR) | | | | | | | 77.90 m | |
| 5 | Plamen Minev (BUL) | | | | | | | 77.12 m | |
| 6 | Ivan Tanev (BUL) | | | | | | | 76.28 m | |
| 7 | Enrico Sgrulletti (ITA) | | | | | | | 75.82 m | |
| 8 | Heinz Weis (FRG) | | | | | | | 75.48 m | |
| 9 | Juha Tiainen (FIN) | | | | | | | 73.70 m | |
| 10 | Johann Lindner (AUT) | | | | | | | 73.68 m | |
| 11 | Paul Head (GBR) | | | | | | | 72.68 m | |
| 12 | Claus Dethloff (FRG) | | | | | | | 72.36 m | |

== Participation ==
According to an unofficial count, 20 athletes from 11 countries participated in the event.

- Austria (1)
- Bulgaria (3)
- East Germany (1)
- Finland (2)
- France (2)
- Hungary (2)
- Italy (2)
- Soviet Union (2)
- Sweden (1)
- United Kingdom (1)
- West Germany (3)

== See also ==
- 1987 Men's World Championships Hammer Throw (Rome)
- 1988 Men's Olympic Hammer Throw (Seoul)
- 1991 Men's World Championships Hammer Throw (Tokyo)
- 1992 Men's Olympic Hammer Throw (Barcelona)
