= Guillermo Guzmán =

Mexican athlete (born 1964)

Personal information
- Full name: Guillermo Guzmán Magaña
- Born: 28 September 1964 (age 62)
- Height: 1.82 m (6 ft 0 in)
- Weight: 95 kg (209 lb)

Sport
- Sport: Athletics
- Event: Hammer throw
Medal record
Representing Mexico
Central American and Caribbean Games
Athletics
Silver medal – second place	1990 Mexico City	Hammer throw
Bronze medal – third place	1993 Ponce	Hammer throw
Bronze medal – third place	1998 Maracaibo	Hammer throw
Weightlifting
Bronze medal – third place	1990 Mexico City	+110kg clean and jerk

Guillermo Guzmán Magaña (born 28 September 1964) is a retired Mexican hammer thrower and weightlifter. He threw at the 1991 and 1993 World Championships without qualifying for the final. At the regional level, he won several medals. His personal best throw is 71.46 metres, in Mexico City in 1992. This was briefly a national record.

Guzmán won a bronze medal in weightlifting at the 1990 Central American and Caribbean Games in the 110 kg clean and jerk category.

Guzmán's younger sister Violeta and son Guillermo Jr. were also hammer throwers.

== International competitions ==
Year	Competition	Venue	Position	Event	Notes
Representing Mexico
1986	Central American and Caribbean Games	Santiago, Dominican Republic	5th	Hammer throw	59.60 m
1986	Ibero-American Championships	Havana, Cuba	7th	Hammer throw	54.70 m
1987	Universiade	Zagreb, Yugoslavia	14th	Hammer throw	55.34 m
1988	Ibero-American Championships	Mexico City, Mexico	10th	Discus throw	43.56 m
1988	Ibero-American Championships	Mexico City, Mexico	6th	Hammer throw	60.08 m
1989	Central American and Caribbean Championships	San Juan, Puerto Rico	2nd	Hammer throw	59.56 m
1989	Universiade	Duisburg, West Germany	15th	Hammer throw	58.80 m
1990	Ibero-American Championships	Manaus, Brazil	4th	Hammer throw	63.82 m
1990	Central American and Caribbean Games	Mexico City, Mexico	2nd	Hammer throw	68.18 m
1991	Central American and Caribbean Championships	Xalapa, Mexico	1st	Hammer throw	64.58 m
1991	Pan American Games	Havana, Cuba	4th	Hammer throw	68.34 m
1991	World Championships	Tokyo, Japan	24th (q)	Hammer throw	66.80 m
1992	Ibero-American Championships	Seville, Spain	3rd	Hammer throw	68.06 m
1993	Central American and Caribbean Championships	Cali, Colombia	2nd	Hammer throw	69.96 m
1993	World Championships	Stuttgart, Germany	25th (q)	Hammer throw	67.30 m
1993	Central American and Caribbean Games	Ponce, Puerto Rico	3rd	Hammer throw	65.52 m
1994	Ibero-American Championships	Mar del Plata, Argentina	2nd	Hammer throw	67.74 m
1995	Pan American Games	Mar del Plata, Argentina	5th	Hammer throw	69.84 m
1995	Central American and Caribbean Championships	Guatemala City, Guatemala	3rd	Hammer throw	66.84 m
1997	Central American and Caribbean Championships	San Juan, Puerto Rico	3rd	Hammer throw	67.10 m
1998	Central American and Caribbean Games	Maracaibo, Venezuela	3rd	Hammer throw	63.78 m
