= Paul Head =

British hammer thrower

Personal information
- Nationality: British (English)
- Born: 1 July 1965 (age 61) Forest Gate, Greater London
- Height: 193 cm (6 ft 4 in)
- Weight: 115 kg (254 lb)

Sport
- Sport: Athletics
- Event: Hammer throw
- Club: Newham & Essex Beagles AC
Medal record
Athletics
Representing England
Commonwealth Games
Silver medal – second place	1994 Victoria	hammer
Bronze medal – third place	2002 Manchester	hammer

Paul Head (born 1 July 1965) is a male retired hammer thrower from England who competed at the 1992 Summer Olympics.

== Biography ==
Head competed for Great Britain at the 1992 Olympic Games in Barcelona. A member of the Newham & Essex Beagles Athletic Club he set his personal best (74.02 metres) on 30 August 1990.

He competed in four successive Commonwealth Games; he represented England, at the 1990 Commonwealth Games in Auckland, New Zealand before winning a silver medal when representing England, at the 1994 Commonwealth Games in Victoria, Canada. He represented England for the third time, at the 1998 Commonwealth Games in Kuala Lumpur, Malaysia and then won a bronze medal at the 2002 Commonwealth Games in Manchester.

Head was 12-times British hammer throw champion after winning the British AAA Championships title in 1990, 1993 and 1997, the UK Athletics Championships in 1986, 1989, 1990, 1991, 1992, 1993 and 1997 and by virtue of being the best placed AAA British athlete in 1989 and 1992.

== Achievements ==
Year	Competition	Venue	Position	Notes
Representing Great Britain and England
1990	Commonwealth Games	Auckland, New Zealand	6th	68.14 m
1990	European Championships	Split, FR Yugoslavia	11th	72.68 m
1991	World Championships	Tokyo, Japan	20th (q)	68.52 m
1992	Olympic Games	Barcelona, Spain	22nd (q)	69.58 m
1992	IAAF World Cup	Havana, Cuba	6th	70.32 m
1993	World Championships	Stuttgart, Germany	22nd (q)	68.88 m
1994	Commonwealth Games	Victoria, Canada	2nd	70.18 m
1994	IAAF World Cup	London, United Kingdom	8th	68.38 m
1998	Commonwealth Games	Kuala Lumpur, Malaysia	4th	70.36 m
2002	Commonwealth Games	Manchester, United Kingdom	3rd	68.60 m
