= Lance Deal =

American hammer thrower (born 1961)

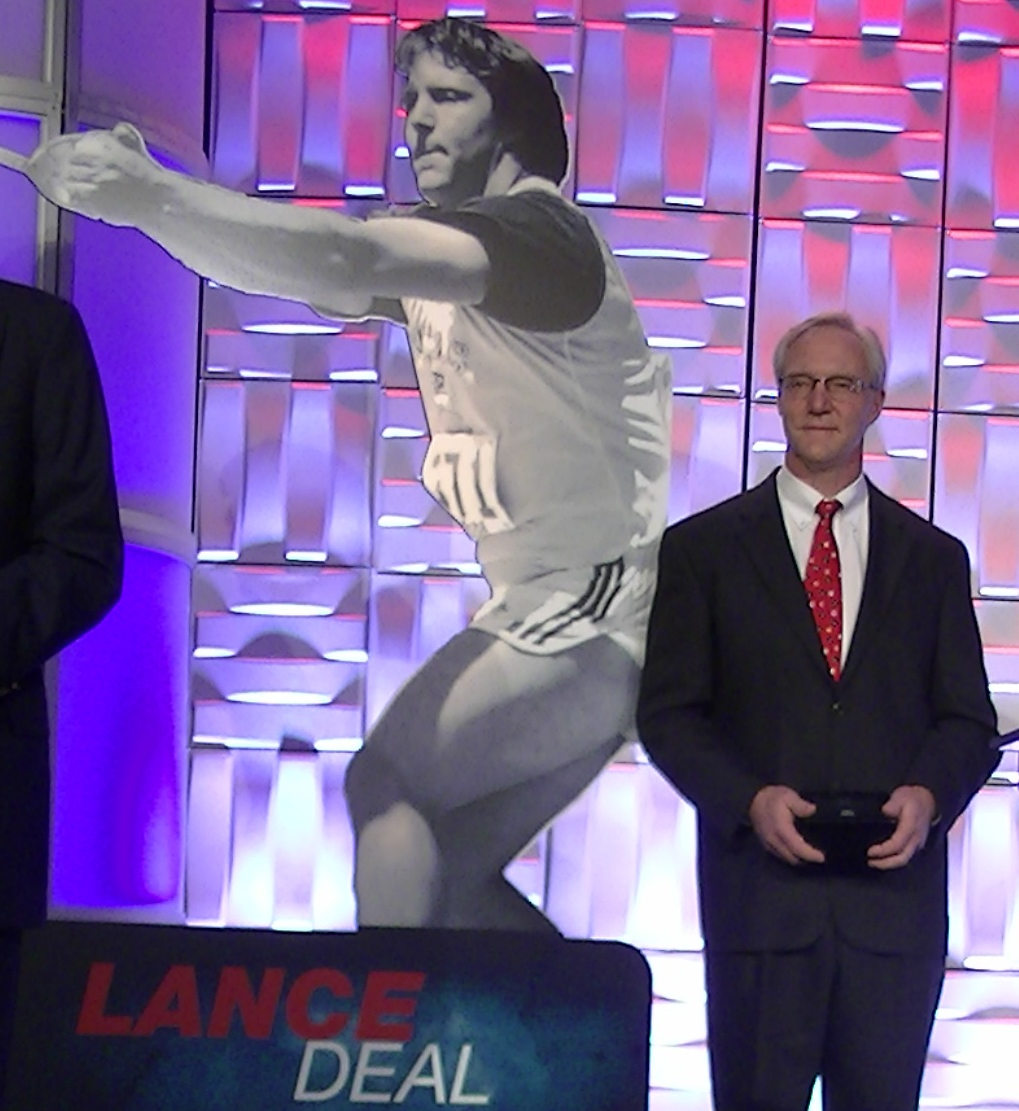

Personal information
- Full name: Lance Earl Deal
- Born: 21 August 1961 (age 64) Riverton, Wyoming, United States
- Height: 1.88 m (6 ft 2 in)
- Weight: 116 kg (256 lb)

Sport
- Country: United States
- Sport: Athletics
- Event: Hammer throw
- College team: Montana State University

Achievements and titles
- Personal best: Hammer throw: 82.52 (1996)
Medal record
Olympic Games
Silver medal – second place	1996 Atlanta	Hammer throw
Pan American Games
Gold medal – first place	1995 Mar del Plata	Hammer throw
Gold medal – first place	1999 Winnipeg	Hammer throw

Lance Earl Deal (born August 21, 1961, in Riverton, Wyoming) is a former American athlete who won a silver medal in the hammer throw in the 1996 Summer Olympics in Atlanta, Georgia. He also competed in the 1988, 1992, and 2000 Summer Olympics.

== Career ==
In the hammer throw finals at the 1996 Olympic Games, only the top eight competitors after three throws were awarded three additional throws. Deal fouled his first two throws; his third equaled the eighth longest throw of the competition. However, he was only in ninth place, because the other competitor had a second legal throw. The announcer initially stated that, on the basis of that tiebreaker, Deal was out of the rest of the competition. The officials corrected the error, however; IAAF rules do not call for breaking ties in this case. So Deal advanced, and on his sixth and final throw, won the silver medal behind Balázs Kiss of Hungary.

Later in the season, he threw 82.52 m (270 ft 8 3/4 in) to win the IAAF Grand Prix Final. 24 years later, in 2020, that throw was ratified as the American Masters M35 record. That mark would also be a World Record if it is ever ratified by WMA.

Deal graduated from Natrona County High School in Casper, Wyoming, where he earned All-State Honors in football, wrestling, and track. He went on to graduate from Montana State University in Bozeman, Montana. He currently works at the University of Oregon as the Director of Track & Field Venues and Program Support. He was the throws coach (for discus, hammer, javelin, and shot put) at the University of Oregon until 2010. Deal is married and has one daughter.

Deal was inducted into the Oregon Sports Hall of Fame on September 25, 2007. He was also inducted into the Wyoming Sports Hall of Fame in 2002. In 2014, he was elected into the National Track and Field Hall of Fame.

== Achievements ==
Year	Competition	Venue	Position	Notes
Representing the United States
1988	Olympic Games	Seoul, South Korea	17th	73.66 m
1991	World Championships	Tokyo, Japan	13th	72.90 m
1992	Olympic Games	Barcelona, Spain	7th	76.84 m
1993	World Championships	Stuttgart, Germany	9th	76.20 m
1995	Pan American Games	Mar del Plata, Argentina	1st	75.64 m
1995	World Championships	Gothenburg, Sweden	5th	78.66 m
1996	Olympic Games	Atlanta, Georgia, United States	2nd	81.12 m
1996	IAAF Grand Prix Final	Milan, Italy	1st	82.52 m
1999	Pan American Games	Winnipeg, Canada	1st	79.61 m
1999	World Championships	Seville, Spain	13th	75.29 m
2000	Olympic Games	Sydney, Australia	16th	75.61 m
