= 1990 World Junior Championships in Athletics =

International athletics competition

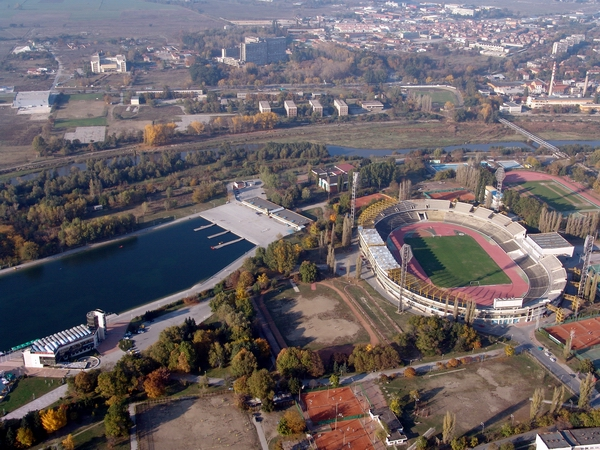
- The host stadium in Plovdiv
- Host city: Plovdiv, Bulgaria
- Nations: 87
- Athletes: 987
- Events: 41
- Dates: 8–12 August
- Main venue: 9th September Stadium

The 1990 World Junior Championships in Athletics was the 1990 edition of the World Junior Championships in Athletics. It was held in Plovdiv, Bulgaria on 8–12 August.

== Results ==
=== Men ===
Event	Gold		Silver		Bronze	
100 metres	Davidson Ezinwa; Nigeria	10.17 =CR	Jason Livingston; Great Britain	10.25	Rodney Bridges; United States	10.37
200 metres	Aleksandr Goremykin; Soviet Union	20.47 CR	Davidson Ezinwa; Nigeria	20.75	James Stallworth; United States	20.81
400 metres	Chris Nelloms; United States	45.43 CR	Rico Lieder; East Germany	46.28	Mark Richardson; Great Britain	46.33
800 metres	Desta Asgedom; Ethiopia	1:46.35 CR	Jonah Birir; Kenya	1:46.61	Norberto Téllez; Cuba	1:47.33
1500 metres	Moses Kiptanui; Kenya	3:38.32 CR	Alemayehu Roba; Ethiopia	3:41.71	Desta Asgedom; Ethiopia	3:43.38
5000 metres	Fita Bayissa; Ethiopia	13:42.59 CR	Abreham Assefa; Ethiopia	13:44.63	Francesco Bennici; Italy	13:47.10
10,000 metres	Richard Chelimo; Kenya	28:18.57 CR	Ismael Kirui; Kenya	28:40.77	Juma Ninga; Tanzania	28:41.90
20 kilometres road run	Cosmas Ndeti; Kenya	59:42	Juma Ninga; Tanzania	1:00:30	Dagane Dabela; Ethiopia	1:01:02
110 metres hurdles	Antti Haapakoski; Finland	13.74	Alexis Sánchez; Cuba	13.75	Kyle Vander-Kuyp; Australia	13.85
400 metres hurdles	Rohan Robinson; Australia	49.73	Yoshihiko Saito; Japan	49.99	Aleksandr Belikov; Soviet Union	50.22
3000 metres steeplechase	Matthew Birir; Kenya	8:31.02 CR	Francisco Munuera; Spain	8:41.03	Simeon Rono; Kenya	8:42:05
10,000 metres walk	Ilya Markov; Soviet Union	39:55.52	Alberto Cruz; Mexico	39:56.49	Jefferson Pérez; Ecuador	40:08.23
4 × 100 metres relay	United States; Chris Nelloms; Rodney Bridges; Reggie Harris; James Stallworth	39.13 CR	Soviet Union; Sergejs Insakovs; Konstantin Gromadskiy; Vitaliy Semyonov; Aleksandr Goremykin	39.58	Nigeria; Innocent Asonze; Davidson Ezinwa; Nnamdi Anusim; Osmond Ezinwa	39.68
4 × 400 metres relay	United States; Derek Mills; Marvin Samuels; Reggie Harris; Chris Nelloms	3:02.26	Great Britain; David Grindley; Adrian Patrick; Craig Winrow; Mark Richardson	3:03.80	Australia; Matthew Burmeister; Rohan Robinson; Simon Hollingsworth; Paul Greene	3:05.51
High jump	Dragutin Topić; Yugoslavia	2.37 WJR	Tim Forsyth; Australia	2.29	Stevan Zorić; Yugoslavia	2.26
Pole vault	Jean Galfione; France	5.45	Dmitriy Kurkulin; Soviet Union	5.40	Miroslav Dukov; Bulgaria	5.40
Long jump	James Stallworth; United States	8.12 CR	Dion Bentley; United States	8.05	Kareem Streete-Thompson; Cayman Islands	7.94
Triple jump	Sergey Bykov; Soviet Union	16.98 CR	Yoelbi Quesada; Cuba	16.62	Nikolai Raev; Bulgaria	16.22
Shot put	Viktor Bulat; Soviet Union	19.21 CR	Xie Shengying; China	18.57	Yuriy Ivanov; Soviet Union	18.13
Discus throw	Ilian Iliev; Bulgaria	58.28	Frank Bicet; Cuba	57.10	Jan Engelmann; East Germany	56.82
Javelin throw	Tommi Viskari; Finland	73.88	Dariusz Trafas; Poland	72.76	Jarkko Heimonen; Finland	72.30
Hammer throw	Andrey Debeliy; Soviet Union	70.60	Savvas Saritzoglou; Greece	70.32	Andrey Budykin; Soviet Union	69.36
Decathlon	Eric Kaiser; West Germany	7762	Jarkko Finni; Finland	7698	David Bigham; Great Britain	7488
WR world record | AR area record | CR championship record | GR games record | NR national record | OR Olympic record | PB personal best | SB season best | WL world leading (in a given season)

=== Women ===
Event	Gold		Silver		Bronze	
100 metres	Andrea Philipp; East Germany	11.36	Nikole Mitchell; Jamaica	11.47	Lucrécia Jardim; Portugal	11.52
200 metres	Diane Smith; Great Britain	23.10 CR	Zundra Feagin; United States	23.13	Lucrécia Jardim; Portugal	23.26
400 metres	Fatima Yusuf; Nigeria	50.62 CR	Charity Opara; Nigeria	51.28	Manuela Derr; East Germany	51.95
800 metres	Liu Li; China	2:03.65	Magdalena Nedelcu; Romania	2:04.52	Aurica Rautu; Romania	2:04.78
1500 metres	Qu Yunxia; China	4:13.67	Claudia Mirela Bortoi; Romania	4:14.19	Malin Ewerlöf; Sweden	4:14.61
3000 metres	Simona Staicu; Romania	9:09.57	Liu Shixiang; China	9:10.54	Hatsumi Matsumoto; Japan	9:11.92
10,000 metres	Derartu Tulu; Ethiopia	32:56.26	Rika Ota; Japan	33:06.85	Lydia Cheromei; Kenya	33:20.83
100 metres hurdles	Gillian Russell; Jamaica	13.31	Keri Maddox; Great Britain	13.38	Ilka Rönisch; East Germany	13.41
400 metres hurdles	Nelli Voronkova; Soviet Union	55.84	Marjana Lužar; Yugoslavia	56.74	Omolade Akinremi; Nigeria	56.97
5000 metres walk	Susana Feitor; Portugal	21:44.30 CR	Tatyana Shchastnaya; Soviet Union	22:28.74	Simone Thust; East Germany	22:44.65
4 × 100 metres relay	Jamaica; Gillian Russell; Revolie Campbell; Merlene Frazer; Nikole Mitchell	43.82	Great Britain; Annabel Soper; Diane Smith; Donna Fraser; Katharine Merry	44.16	United States; Monifa Taylor; Tisha Prather; Angela Burnham; Zundra Feagin	44.50
4 × 400 metres relay	Australia; Sophie Scamps; Renée Poetschka; Kylie Hanigan; Sue Andrews	3:30.38 AU20R NU20R	Jamaica; Claudine Williams; Winsome Cole; Inez Turner; Catherine Scott	3:31.09	Cuba; Yojani Casanova; Julia Duporty; Odalmis Limonta; Nancy McLeón	3:31.81
High jump	Svetlana Lavrova; Soviet Union	1.91	Katja Kilpi; Finland	1.88	Lea Haggett; Great Britain	1.88
Long jump	Iva Prandzheva; Bulgaria	6.53	Erica Johansson; Sweden	6.50	Sandrine Hennart; Belgium	6.49
Shot put	Qiu Qiaoping; China	18.20	Li Xiaoyun; China	17.74	Heike Hopfer; East Germany	17.27
Discus throw	Natalya Koptyukh; Soviet Union	61.44	Lisa-Marie Vizaniari; Australia	60.44	Anja Gündler; East Germany	59.30
Javelin throw	Tanja Damaske; East Germany	61.06	Oksana Ovchinnikova; Soviet Union	57.26	Mandy Liverton; Great Britain	56.98
Heptathlon	Beatrice Mau; East Germany	6166	Rita Ináncsi; Hungary	5940	Joanne Henry; New Zealand	5728
WR world record | AR area record | CR championship record | GR games record | NR national record | OR Olympic record | PB personal best | SB season best | WL world leading (in a given season)

== Medal table ==
* Host nation (Bulgaria)

Rank	Nation	Gold	Silver	Bronze	Total
1	Soviet Union	8	4	3	15
2	United States	4	2	3	9
3	Kenya	4	2	2	8
4	China	3	3	0	6
5	Ethiopia	3	2	2	7
6	East Germany	3	1	6	10
7	Australia	2	2	2	6
7	Nigeria	2	2	2	6
9	Finland	2	2	1	5
10	Jamaica	2	2	0	4
11	Bulgaria*	2	0	2	4
12	Great Britain	1	4	4	9
13	Romania	1	2	1	4
14	Yugoslavia	1	1	1	3
15	Portugal	1	0	2	3
16	France	1	0	0	1
16	West Germany	1	0	0	1
18	Cuba	0	3	2	5
19	Japan	0	2	1	3
20	Sweden	0	1	1	2
20	Tanzania	0	1	1	2
22	Greece	0	1	0	1
22	Hungary	0	1	0	1
22	Mexico	0	1	0	1
22	Poland	0	1	0	1
22	Spain	0	1	0	1
27	Belgium	0	0	1	1
27	Cayman Islands	0	0	1	1
27	Ecuador	0	0	1	1
27	Italy	0	0	1	1
27	New Zealand	0	0	1	1
Totals (31 entries)		41	41	41	123

== Participation ==
According to an unofficial count through an unofficial result list, 987 athletes from 86 countries participated in the event. The number of athletes is in agreement, but there is one country less than the official number of 87 as published.

- Albania (3)
- Algeria (7)
- Andorra (1)
- Anguilla (1)
- Antigua and Barbuda (1)
- Argentina (3)
- Australia (48)
- Austria (7)
- Bahamas (3)
- Barbados (4)
- Belgium (13)
- Bermuda (1)
- Bolivia (1)
- Brazil (15)
- Bulgaria (47)
- Burkina Faso (1)
- Canada (25)
- Cayman Islands (1)
- Central African Republic (1)
- Chile (2)
- China (12)
- Chinese Taipei (5)
- Colombia (1)
- Côte d'Ivoire (2)
- Cuba (25)
- Cyprus (6)
- Czechoslovakia (18)
- Denmark (3)
- East Germany (42)
- Ecuador (6)
- Egypt (2)
- Ethiopia (14)
- Finland (19)
- France (33)
- Great Britain (41)
- Greece (18)
- Hungary (17)
- Iceland (1)
- India (3)
- Iran (1)
- Ireland (14)
- Israel (1)
- Italy (31)
- Jamaica (19)
- Japan (29)
- Kenya (20)
- Lesotho (1)
- Liechtenstein (1)
- Luxembourg (1)
- Malawi (1)
- Malta (2)
- Mauritius (4)
- Mexico (7)
- Morocco (9)
- Namibia (4)
- Netherlands (8)
- New Zealand (15)
- Nigeria (10)
- North Yemen (4)
- Norway (10)
- Paraguay (2)
- Peru (3)
- Poland (16)
- Portugal (20)
- Qatar (3)
- Romania (22)
- Saint Kitts and Nevis (2)
- Senegal (1)
- Sierra Leone (2)
- Singapore (1)
- Somalia (2)
- South Korea (2)
- Soviet Union (69)
- Spain (37)
- Sudan (2)
- Sweden (15)
- Switzerland (6)
- Tanzania (5)
- Trinidad and Tobago (2)
- Turkey (2)
- United States (55)
- Venezuela (5)
- West Germany (50)
- Yugoslavia (14)
- Zambia (3)
- Zimbabwe (1)

== See also ==
- 1990 in athletics (track and field)
