= List of British champions in hammer throw =

The British hammer throw athletics champions covers four competitions; the current British Athletics Championships which was founded in 2007, the preceding AAA Championships (1880–2006), the Amateur Athletic Club Championships (1866–1879) and finally the UK Athletics Championships which existed from 1977 until 1997 and ran concurrently with the AAA Championships.

+Where an international athlete won the AAA Championships the highest ranking UK athlete is considered the National Champion in this list. Irish athletes originally competed for Great Britain.

== Past winners ==
AAC Championships men's event only
Year	Men's champion
1866	Richard James
1867	Patrick Halkett
1868	Henry Leeke
1869	William Burgess
1870	Henry Leeke
1871	William Burgess
1872	Henry Leeke ^{(3)}
1873	James Paterson
1874	Stephen Brown
1875	William Burgess
1876	George Hales
1877	George Hales ^{(2)}
1878	Edmund Baddeley
1879	William Burgess ^{(4)}

AAA Championships hammer throw, men's event only
Year	Men's champion
1880	Walter Lawrence
1881	Maurice Davin
1882	Edmund Baddeley ^{(2)}
1883	John Gruer
1884	Owen Harte
1885	William Barry
1886	James Mitchel
1887	James Mitchel
1888	James Mitchel ^{(3)}
1889	William Barry
1890	Robert Lindsay
1891	R. Nelson Robbie
1892	William Barry
1893	Denis Carey
1894	William Barry
1895	William Barry ^{(5)}
1896	John Flanagan
1897	Tom Kiely
1898	Tom Kiely
1899	Tom Kiely
1900	Denis Horgan+
1901	Tom Kiely
1902	Tom Kiely ^{(5)}
1903	Tom Nicolson
1904	Tom Nicolson
1905	Tom Nicolson
1906	Henry Alan Leeke
1907	Tom Nicolson
1908	Robert Lindsay-Watson
1909	Tom Nicolson
1910	Alf Flaxman
1911	Alf Flaxman
1912	Tom Nicolson
1913	Alf Flaxman ^{(3)}
1914	Tom Nicolson ^{(7)}
1919	John Freeborn
1920	Don Rose
1921	Malcolm Nokes
1922	Malcolm Nokes
1923	Malcolm Nokes
1924	Malcolm Nokes
1925	Malcolm Nokes
1926	Malcolm Nokes
1927	Malcolm Nokes
1928	Malcolm Nokes
1929	NBA
1930	Malcolm Nokes ^{(9)}
1931	NBA
1932	John Jarvis
1933	Sandy Smith
1934	Sandy Smith
1935	Jim Rioch
1936	Sandy Smith
1937	Duncan Clark & Sandy Smith ^{(4)}
1938	Tom McAnallen
1939	Norman Drake
1946	Duncan Clark
1947	Duncan Clark
1948	Norman Drake ^{(2)}
1949	Duncan Clark
1950	Duncan Clark
1951	Duncan Clark
1952	Duncan Clark ^{(7)}
1953	Don Anthony
1954	Alec Valentine
1955	Ewan Douglas
1956	Peter Allday
1957	Mike Ellis
1958	Mike Ellis
1959	Mike Ellis
1960	Mike Ellis ^{(4)}
1961	Howard Payne
1962	Howard Payne
1963	Howard Payne
1964	Howard Payne
1965	Howard Payne
1966	Howard Payne
1967	Howard Payne
1968	Howard Payne
1969	Howard Payne
1970	Howard Payne
1971	Howard Payne
1972	Barry Williams
1973	Howard Payne
1974	Howard Payne ^{(13)}
1975	Paul Dickenson
1976	Chris Black

AAA Championships & UK Athletics Championships dual championships era 1977-1997
Year	AAA Men	Year	UK Men
1977	Chris Black	1977	Paul Dickenson
1978	Paul Dickenson ^{(2)}	1978	Chris Black
1979	Matthew Mileham	1979	Chris Black
1980	Martin Girvan	1980	Paul Dickenson
1981	Martin Girvan ^{(2)}	1981	Martin Girvan
1982	Robert Weir	1982	Martin Girvan
1983	Chris Black ^{(3)}	1983	Martin Girvan
1984	David Smith	1984	David Smith
1985	David Smith	1985	David Smith
1986	David Smith	1986	Paul Head
1987	David Smith	1987	David Smith
1988	David Smith ^{(5)}	1988	David Smith
1989	Paul Head	1989	Paul Head
1990	Paul Head	1990	Paul Head

AAA Championships & UK Athletics Championships
Year	Men AAA	Women AAA	Year	Men UK	Women UK
1991	Mick Jones	Fiona Whitehead	1991	Paul Head	nc
1992	Paul Head	nc	1992	Paul Head	nc
1993	Paul Head	Esther Augee	1993	Paul Head	Lorraine Shaw
1994	Peter Vivian	Lorraine Shaw	n/a		
1995	Mick Jones	Lorraine Shaw	n/a		
1996	David W. Smith	Lyn Sprules	n/a		
1997	Paul Head ^{(5)}	Lyn Sprules	1997	Paul Head	Sarah Moore

AAA Championships second era 1998-2006
Year	Men's champion	Women's champion
1998	Mick Jones	Lorraine Shaw
1999	Mick Jones	Lyn Sprules ^{(3)}
2000	Mick Jones	Lorraine Shaw
2001	Mick Jones	Lorraine Shaw
2002	Mick Jones	Lorraine Shaw
2003	Bill Beauchamp	Lorraine Shaw
2004	Mick Jones ^{(8)}	Lorraine Shaw ^{(8)}
2005	Andy Frost	Shirley Webb
2006	Andy Frost	Shirley Webb ^{(2)}

British Athletics Championships 2007 to present
Year	Men's champion	Women's champion
2007	Andy Frost	Zoe Derham
2008	Mike Floyd	Zoe Derham
2009	Alex Smith	Zoe Derham
2010	Alex Smith	Zoe Derham ^{(4)}
2011	Alex Smith	Sophie Hitchon
2012	Alex Smith ^{(4)}	Sophie Hitchon
2013	Andy Frost ^{(4)}	Shaunagh Brown
2014	Nick Miller	Sophie Hitchon
2015	Nick Miller	Sophie Hitchon
2016	Chris Bennett	Sophie Hitchon
2017	Nick Miller	Sophie Hitchon
2018	Nick Miller	Sophie Hitchon ^{(7)}
2019	Nick Miller	Jessica Mayho
2020	Craig Murch	Jessica Mayho ^{(2)}
2021	Taylor Campbell	Tara Simpson-Sullivan
2022	Nick Miller ^{(6)}	Charlotte Payne
2023	Jake Norris	Charlotte Payne ^{(2)}
2024	Jake Norris	Anna Purchase
2025	Jake Norris	Anna Purchase
2026	Jake Norris ^{(4)}	Anna Purchase ^{(3)}

- NBA = No British athlete in medal placings
- nc = not contested
