= Mike Ellis (athlete) =

English hammer thrower

Personal information
- Nationality: British (English)
- Born: 3 September 1936 (age 89) Bloomsbury, London, England
- Height: 193 cm (6 ft 4 in)
- Weight: 102 kg (225 lb)

Sport
- Sport: Athletics
- Event: hammer throw
- Club: Thames Valley Harriers
Medal record
Men's athletics
Representing England
British Empire and Commonwealth Games
Gold medal – first place	1958 Cardiff	Hammer throw

Michael John Ellis (born 3 September 1936) was an Olympic athlete from England.

== Biography ==
Ellis specialised in the hammer throw events during his career and became the British hammeer throw champion after winning the British AAA Championships title at the 1957 AAA Championships and retained his title at the 1958 AAA Championships.

Shortly afterwards he represented the England athletics team and claimed the gold medal for them in the men's hammer throw event at the 1958 British Empire and Commonwealth Games in Cardiff, Wales. Just before those games, he was one of many signatories in a letter to The Times on 17 July 1958 opposing 'the policy of apartheid' in international sport and defending 'the principle of racial equality which is embodied in the Declaration of the Olympic Games'.

Ellis won two more AAA hammer throw titles at the 1959 AAA Championships and the 1960 AAA Championships respectively.

At the 1960 Olympic Games in Rome, he represented Great Britain in the hammer throw competition.
