= Athletics at the 1987 Summer Universiade – Men's hammer throw =

The men's hammer throw event at the 1987 Summer Universiade was held at the Stadion Maksimir in Zagreb on 15 July 1987.

== Results ==
Rank	Athlete	Nationality	Result	Notes
1st place, gold medalist(s)	Igor Astapkovich	Soviet Union	78.46	UR
2nd place, silver medalist(s)	Heinz Weis	West Germany	76.98	
3rd place, bronze medalist(s)	Lucio Serrani	Italy	75.70	
4	Ken Flax	United States	74.34	
5	Igor Shchegolev	Soviet Union	74.22	
6	Klaus-Bernd Leitges	West Germany	73.12	
7	Sándor Füzesi	Hungary	72.30	
8	Michael Beierl	Austria	71.12	
9	Francisco Fuentes	Spain	69.64	
10	Jari Matinolli	Finland	69.02	
11	Nenad Pavlinić	Yugoslavia	60.06	
12	Murat Elçin	Turkey	56.46	
13	Mike Maynard	United States	55.74	
14	Guillermo Guzmán	Mexico	55.34	
