= Andrey Abduvaliyev =

Soviet hammer thrower (born 1966)

Personal information
- Native name: Андрей Хакимович Абдувалиев
- Full name: Andrey Hakimovich Abduvaliyev
- Nationality: Uzbek
- Born: 30 June 1966 (age 60) Leningrad, Russian SFSR, Soviet Union
- Height: 1.90 m (6 ft 3 in)
- Weight: 125 kg (276 lb)

Sport
- Country: Soviet Union; Tajikistan; Uzbekistan
- Sport: Athletics
- Event: Hammer throw
- Club: Dynamo Dushanbe

Achievements and titles
- Personal best: 83.46 m (1990)
Medal record
Men's athletics
Representing Unified Team
Olympic Games
Gold medal – first place	1992 Barcelona	Hammer throw
Representing Tajikistan
World Championships
Gold medal – first place	1993 Stuttgart	Hammer throw
Gold medal – first place	1995 Gothenburg	Hammer throw
Representing Uzbekistan
Asian Championships
Gold medal – first place	1998 Fukuoka	Hammer throw
Asian Games
Silver medal – second place	1998 Bangkok	Hammer throw

Andrey Hakimovich Abduvaliyev (Russian: Андрей Хакимович Абдувалиев; born 30 June 1966) is a former Soviet, Tajikistani, and Uzbekistani hammer thrower.

He won a gold medal at the 1992 Summer Olympics while representing the Unified Team. After competing for USSR he chose to represent Tajikistan when USSR was dissolved. In 1997 he changed his nationality to Uzbekistan, thus becoming one of the very few athletes to compete for three states. His second Olympic participation was in 2000 while representing Uzbekistan.

His personal best was 83.46 m in 1990.

== International competitions ==
Year	Competition	Venue	Position	Notes
Representing the Soviet Union
1990	Goodwill Games	Seattle, United States	2nd	82.20 m
1991	World Championships	Tokyo, Japan	5th	78.30 m
Representing the Unified Team
1992	Olympic Games	Barcelona, Spain	1st	82.54 m
Representing Tajikistan
1993	World Championships	Stuttgart, Germany	1st	81.64 m
1995	World Championships	Göteborg, Sweden	1st	81.56 m
1995	Central Asian Games	Tashkent, Uzbekistan	1st	
Representing Uzbekistan
1997	World Championships	Athens, Greece	15th	74.96 m
1998	Asian Championships	Fukuoka, Japan	1st	
1998	Asian Games	Bangkok, Thailand	2nd	
1999	World Championships	Seville, Spain	15th	75.12 m
2000	Olympic Games	Sydney, Australia	15th	75.64 m
