= Athletics at the 2002 Commonwealth Games – Men's hammer throw =

Men's hammer throw at the Commonwealth Games

The men's hammer throw event at the 2002 Commonwealth Games was held on 28 July.

== Results ==
| Rank | Athlete | Nationality | #1 | #2 | #3 | #4 | #5 | #6 | Result | Notes |
|---|---|---|---|---|---|---|---|---|---|---|
| 1st place, gold medalist(s) | Michael Jones | England | 67.34 | 68.20 | 68.60 | 70.40 | 68.95 | 72.55 | 72.55 | |
| 2nd place, silver medalist(s) | Philip Jensen | New Zealand | 65.95 | 66.77 | 68.42 | 69.48 | 66.16 | 68.40 | 69.48 | |
| 3rd place, bronze medalist(s) | Paul Head | England | 64.44 | 66.74 | 68.60 | x | 67.82 | 66.36 | 68.60 | |
| 4 | Stuart Rendell | Australia | x | x | 61.89 | 67.51 | x | x | 67.51 | |
| 5 | Iain Park | Scotland | x | 59.98 | 62.35 | 65.23 | x | 65.51 | 65.51 | |
| 6 | William Beauchamp | England | 64.96 | x | x | 64.17 | 63.62 | 64.84 | 64.96 | |
| 7 | Petros Mitsides | Cyprus | 51.66 | 53.34 | x | 51.78 | 53.22 | 52.40 | 53.34 | |
| 8 | Nicolas Li Yun Fong | Mauritius | x | 45.21 | 50.84 | x | 51.66 | 53.13 | 53.13 | |
| 9 | Brentt Jones | Norfolk Island | x | 49.84 | 50.38 | | | | 50.38 | |
