= Raphaël Piolanti =

French hammer thrower

Raphaël Piolanti (born 14 November 1967 in Metz) is a retired male hammer thrower from France. His personal best throw is 79.68 metres, achieved in September 1992 in Bourgoin-Jallieu. This was a French record at that time.

In November 1993 he was found guilty of sexual assault on fellow athletes Catherine Moyon de Baecque and Michelle Rouveyrol. He allegedly raped them during an athletics camp in August 1991.

Piolanti is now president and coach in Athletic Club Amneville – the athletic club he has been in his entire career. He has trained several high calibre throwers at the club including Jerome Bortoluzzi, Maxime Maier, Quentin Bigot, and Bruno Boccalate.

In July 2014 he was accused of supporting the doping of athletes, including Quentin Bigot.

In 2018, a French court issued a lifetime ban from competitive athletics to Piolanti for the possession and administration of prohibited substances. The court also sentenced him to one-year suspended prison term.

== Achievements ==
Year	Competition	Venue	Position	Notes
Representing France
1985	European Junior Championships	Cottbus, East Germany	9th	60.90 m
1986	World Junior Championships	Athens, Greece	4th	68.26 m
1989	Jeux de la Francophonie	Casablanca, Morocco	1st	73.16 m
1990	European Championships	Split, Yugoslavia	14th	72.50 m
1991	World Championships	Tokyo, Japan	8th	73.64 m
1991	Mediterranean Games	Athens, Greece	1st	75.10 m
1992	Olympic Games	Barcelona, Spain	16th	73.22 m
1993	World Championships	Stuttgart, Germany	10th	75.88 m
1995	World Championships	Gothenburg, Sweden	9th	75.98 m
1996	Olympic Games	Atlanta, United States	11th	75.24 m
1997	World Championships	Athens, Greece	11th	74.08 m
1997	Mediterranean Games	Bari, Italy	2nd	77.20 m
1999	World Championships	Seville, Spain	22nd	74.23 m
2001	Mediterranean Games	Radès, Tunisia	3rd	71.52 m
2001	Jeux de la Francophonie	Ottawa-Hull, Canada	3rd	72.71 m
