= Masters M35 discus world record progression =

Masters M35 discus world record progression is the progression of world record improvements of the discus M35 division of Masters athletics. Records must be set in properly conducted, official competitions under the standing IAAF rules unless modified by World Masters Athletics. The M35 division consists of male athletes who have reached the age of 35 but have not yet reached the age of 40, so exactly from their 35th birthday to the day before their 40th birthday. The M35 division throws exactly the same 2 kg implement as the Open division. These competitors all threw their records in open competition.

Key

Incomplete information Pending

Distance	Athlete	Nationality	Birthdate	Location	Date
71.56	Virgilijus Alekna	Lithuania	13.02.1972	Kaunas	25.07.2007
71.26T	Rickard Bruch	Sweden	02.07.1946	Malmö	15.11.1984
71.26	John Powell	United States	25.06.1947	San Jose	09.06.1984
69.82	John Powell	United States	25.06.1947	San Jose	09.06.1984
69.22	Art Swarts	United States	14.02.1945	Wichita	31.05.1980
67.18	Ludvik Danek	Czechoslovakia	06.01.1937	Prague	10.07.1974
67.02	Lothar Milde	East Germany	08.11.1934	Halle	07.05.1972
66.07	Jay Silvester	United States	27.08.1937	Modesto	26.05.1973
61.52	Leslie "Les" Mills	New Zealand	01.11.1934	Auckland	30.01.1971
60.46	Vladimir Truseniev	Soviet Union	03.08.1931	Leselidze	15.05.1967
