= Claus Dethloff =

German hammer thrower

Dr. Claus Dethloff
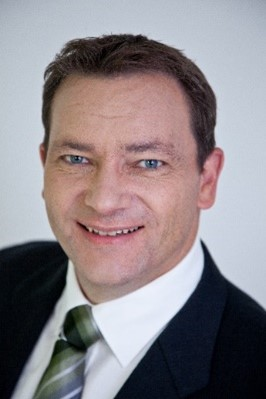

Personal information
- National team: Germany
- Born: 24 September 1968 (age 58) Lübeck, West Germany

Sport
- Country: Germany
- Sport: Athletics
- Event: Hammer throw
- Club: TSV Bayer 04 Leverkusen (1997–1998); LG Bayer Leverkusen (1992–1996); LG Frankfurt (1991); MTV Lübeck (until 1990)
- Retired: 1998

Achievements and titles
- Personal best: 77.68 (1994)
Medal record
Men's hammer throw
Representing Germany
Event	1st	2nd	3rd
German Championships	1	4	2
European Junior Championships	–	–	1
Total	1	4	3

Claus Dethloff (born 24 September 1968) is a retired West German hammer thrower.

Dethloff represented the sports clubs MTV Lübeck (up to 1990), LG Frankfurt (in 1991) and LG Bayer Leverkusen, and became German champion in 1995. He won silver medals at the German championships in 1990, 1991, 1992, 1994 and bronze medals in 1993 and 1996.

His personal best throw was 77.68 metres, achieved in September 1994 in Lübeck.

== International competitions ==
Year	Competition	Venue	Position	Notes
Representing West Germany
1987	European Junior Championships	Birmingham, United Kingdom	3rd	69.30 m
1990	European Championships	Split, Yugoslavia	12th	72.36 m
Representing Germany
1991	World Championships	Tokyo, Japan	10th	72.96 m
1992	Olympic Games	Barcelona, Spain	14th	73.64 m
1994	European Championships	Helsinki, Finland	19th	72.08 m
1995	Summer Universiade	Fukuoka, Japan	10th	72.16 m
1995	World Championships	Gothenburg, Sweden	27th	69.64 m
1996	Olympic Games	Atlanta, Georgia, United States	14th	74.60 m
