= Hans Lotz =

Australian hammer thrower (1947–2021)

Hans-Martin Lotz (1 November 1947 - 2 May 2021) was an Australian hammer thrower.

He finished fourth at the 1982 Commonwealth Games, won the silver medal at the 1985 Pacific Conference Games finished sixth at the 1985 World Cup and seventh at the 1986 Commonwealth Games. He also competed at the 1983 World Championships without reaching the final.

Lotz became Australian champion in 1981 and 1982 as a West German citizen, then in 1983–1985 as an Australian citizen. His main competitors were Joe Quigley and Sean Carlin. His personal best throw was 73.80 metres, achieved in April 1983 in Melbourne.
