= Philip Jensen =

New Zealand hammer thrower

Personal information
- Full name: Philip Ronald Jensen
- Born: 8 November 1967 (age 58) Te Aroha, New Zealand

Sport
- Country: New Zealand
- Sport: Athletics
- Event: Hammer throw

Achievements and titles
- National finals: Hammer throw champion (20 titles)
- Personal best: 72.06 m (1998)
Medal record
Men's athletics
Representing New Zealand
Commonwealth Games
Silver medal – second place	2002 Manchester	Hammer

Philip Jensen (born 8 November 1967) is a former New Zealand hammer thrower. He represented his country at three Commonwealth Games, with his best result coming at the 2002 Commonwealth Games held in Manchester, England, where he won the silver medal. He also competed in the IAAF World Cup held in Madrid, Spain that same year.

== Early life ==
Jensen was born in Te Aroha on 8 November 1967. Early in his sporting career he represented New Zealand in rugby union, when from November 1984 to January 1985 he toured the United Kingdom with the New Zealand Secondary Schools team. Later that year he was again picked for the New Zealand Secondary Schools team that toured Australia.

== Athletics career ==
=== World Cup ===
Year	Place	Event	Performance
2002	7th	Hammer throw	67.09m

=== Commonwealth Games ===
Year	Place	Event	Performance
2002	2nd	Hammer throw	69.48 m
1998	6th	Hammer throw	69.63 m
1990	5th	Hammer throw	68.96 m

=== New Zealand Athletics Championships ===
Jensen holds the following championship records:

- most titles – 20
- longest career – 26 years between his first title win and his last
- most consecutive titles – 17

Year	Place	Event	Performance	Age (years)	Region	Club
2015	2nd	Hammer throw	61.23 m	47	Wellington	LHAAC
2014	1st	Hammer throw	61.85 m	46	Wellington	LHAAC
2013	1st	Hammer throw	60.73 m	45	Wellington	LHAAC
2012	1st	Hammer throw	60.65 m	44	Wellington	LHAAC
2011	1st	Hammer throw	59.04 m	43	Wellington	LHAAC
2010	1st	Hammer throw	62.53 m	42	Wellington	LHAAC
2009	1st	Hammer throw	58.90 m	41	Wellington	LHAAC
2008	1st	Hammer throw	60.37 m	40	Auckland	Bays
2007	1st	Hammer throw	62.20 m	39	Auckland	Bays
2006	1st	Hammer throw	65.85 m	38	Auckland	Bays
2005	1st	Hammer throw	65.72 m	37	Auckland	Bays
2004	1st	Hammer throw	68.14 m	36	Auckland	Bays
2003	1st	Hammer throw	69.52 m	35	Auckland	Bays
2002	1st	Hammer throw	65.65 m	34	Auckland	Bays
2001	1st	Hammer throw	62.80 m	33	Auckland	Bays
2000	1st	Hammer throw	69.19 m	32	Auckland	Bays
1999	1st	Hammer throw	69.16 m	31	Auckland	Bays
1998	1st	Hammer throw	70.88 m	30	Auckland	Bays
1997	3rd	Hammer throw	65.22 m	29	Waikato	HAAC
1996	1st	Hammer throw	64.68 m	28	Waikato	HAAC
1995	1st	Hammer throw	62.08 m	27	Waikato	HAAC
1990 (Note: 25 November 1989 – While held in November 1989 this competition was both the 1990 National Championship and Commonwealth Games trials.)	2nd	Hammer throw	66.12 m	22	Waikato	HAAC
1989 (Note: 11 March 1989)	2nd	Hammer throw	63.80 m	21	Waikato	HAAC
1988	1st	Hammer throw	64.02 m	20	Waikato	HAAC

=== Personal best ===
His personal best for the hammer throw is 72.06 m, achieved in February 1998 in Auckland.

== Honours and awards ==
In 1990, Jensen was awarded the New Zealand 1990 Commemoration Medal.
