= Norbert Radefeld =

German hammer thrower

Norbert Radefeld (3 March 1962 – October 2009) was a West German hammer thrower. His personal best throw was 78.28 metres, achieved in July 1988 in Frankfurt am Main.

He competed at the 1990 European Championships without reaching the final. Radefeld represented the sports club VfL Wolfsburg, and won the silver medal at the West German championships in 1988.

== Achievements ==
Year	Competition	Venue	Position	Notes
Representing Germany
1990	European Championships	Split, Yugoslavia	16th	72.42 m
