= Jane Buchan =

American businesswoman

- Education: Yale College; Harvard University
- Occupation: CEO

Jane Buchan is the chief executive officer of Martlet Asset Management, LLC., a Newport Beach-based company that launched in January 2019.

In 2000, Jane co-founded Pacific Alternative Asset Management Company (PAAMCO), a global investment firm based in Irvine, CA. PAAMCO merged with Prisma Capital Partners, LP to form PAAMCO Prisma Holdings, LLC in June 2017. As of June 30, 2018 PAAMCO Prisma had $32 billion in AUM, third largest fund of funds firm globally according to HFM InvestHedge Billion Dollar Club: H1 2018, published September 7, 2018.

== Early life and education ==
Buchan was born in Seattle, Washington but grew up in Portland, Oregon where her parents were professors of medicine at Oregon Health & Science University. Buchan graduated from Yale College in 1986 where, in addition to studying economics, she was awarded the Nellie Pratt Elliot Award, which goes to the senior woman whose excellence in the field of athletics and in her life at Yale best represents the ideals of sportsmanship and Yale tradition. In 1987–1989, she competed for Nike Coast Track Club in the high jump and also participated in the 1988 US Olympic trials. Buchan later earned MA and PhD degrees in business economics from Harvard University.

== Professional career ==
After Yale, Buchan started her investment career at JPMorgan Chase in the Investment Management's Capital Markets Group in New York as a quantitative fixed income analyst. Prior to starting PAAMCO in 2000 with three co-founders, she was an assistant professor of finance at the Amos Tuck School of Business at Dartmouth.

Buchan received the "2014 North American Industry Leadership Award" from 100 Women in Hedge Funds (the precursor to 100 Women in Finance), and was named one of "50 Women in Hedge Funds" by The Hedge Fund Journal and Ernst & Young in 2017, 2013, 2010 and 2009. In June 2015, Buchan was selected as one of five honorees out of 215 nominees for the 2015 Women in Business Awards presented by the Orange County Business Journal. In 2015, she was named to the InvestHedge Hall of Fame. Jane was named to the Barron's 100 Most Influential Women in US Finance in 2020 and again in 2021. Buchan speaks at industry panels and conferences as a moderator, panelist and keynote. She has been featured on CNBC and Bloomberg television, and has been a regular contributor to both the business and investment press.

== Professional associations ==
Jane Buchan is an Associate Editor for the Journal of Alternative Investments and served as Director and chair of the board for the Chartered Alternative Investment Analyst Association (CAIA). She serves as a Director for AGF Management (TSE:AGF.B) and IMMIX Biopharma (NASDAQ: IMMX) and retired as a director of Globe Life (NYSE:GL) (2005–2024) due to term limits. She serves as a trustee to the Standard Boards for Alternative Investments, formally Hedge Fund Standards Board. Buchan Pledged $1 Million for Reed College in Portland, Oregon. Jane Buchan is a 100 Women in Finance Charter Angel to recognize the support she provided in the formation and funding of the 100 Women in Hedge Funds Association and Foundation.

== Involvement with local public schools ==
Over the past ten years, Buchan has given more than $1 million to the Garden Grove Unified School District (GGUSD) in California. Her relationship with GGUSD began ten years ago when Bryant Elementary School lost funding for their 6th graders to attend science camp. Buchan stepped in to provide the funding and since then has provided a kindergarten playground for Bryant as well as smart boards, laptops and other technology tools. Over the years, her involvement has broadened to other schools including Peters Elementary, Newhope Elementary and Heritage Elementary. At the Garden Grove Unified School District board meeting on November 15, 2016, the board highlighted the substantial impact that Buchan's involvement has had on the students in Garden Grove and honored her for her commitment, particularly to STEM-related initiatives.

== Personal life ==
Buchan is married to track and field coach Jim Driscoll. Driscoll won a gold medal in the hammer throw for the United States at the 1991 Pan American Games.
