= Joe Quigley (athlete) =

Australian hammer thrower

Joe Quigley (born 5 December 1961) is a retired Australian hammer thrower.

He won the bronze medal at the 1985 Pacific Conference Games and finished fifth at the 1986 Commonwealth Games. Here, he also won the silver medal in the shot put.

Quigley became Australian champion in 1986 and 1989. His main competitors were Hans Lotz and Sean Carlin. His personal best throw was 74.58 metres, achieved in March 1987 in Melbourne.
