= Iain Park =

Iain Park (born 16 July 1974 in Ashford, Kent) is a former Scottish and Great Britain hammer thrower who competed at the Commonwealth Games in Manchester 2002, and Melbourne 2006.

He qualified as leading Scot to represent Scotland in the hammer throw at the 2002 Manchester Commonwealth Games, where he finished 5th place with a distance of 65.51m. Iain also competed at the 2006 Melbourne Commonwealth Games finishing 10th, but carrying a bi-lateral hamstring tear which had hampered his training leading up to the competition. In 1996 he was selected to represent Great Britain at U23 level against Russia and Germany.

Iain has won the Scottish National Athletics Championships in his event at every age group including youth U18, Junior U20 and Senior. He was first selected to represent Scotland in 1991 in Northern Ireland.

His personal best with the hammer is 69.74m which he achieved on 7 September 2003.
