= Jessica Mayho =

English hammer thrower

Personal information
- Born: 14 June 1993 (age 32)

Sport
- Country: Great Britain
- Sport: Athletics
- Event: Hammer throw
- Club: Birchfield Harriers

Jessica Mayho (born 14 June 1993) is an English track and field athlete specialising in the hammer throw.

She became a double British champion when she successfully defended her title by winning the hammer throw event at the 2020 British Athletics Championships with a throw of 65.47 metres.
