= Andrey Budykin =

Russian hammer thrower

Personal information
- Born: 14 April 1971 (age 55)

Sport
- Sport: Athletics
- Event(s): Hammer throw, discus throw

Achievements and titles
- Personal best: HT – 79.70 m (1995)

Andrey Vyacheslavovich Budykin (Russian: Андрей Вячеславович Будыкин; born 14 April 1971) is a retired Russian hammer thrower who won a bronze medal at the 1990 World Junior Championships. His career as a senior peaked in 1995, when he set his personal best at 79.70 m and was ranked ninth in the world. Later he lost his eyesight in an accident, but continued competing in the discus throw, becoming the national champion among handicapped athletes in 2011 and 2012, and finishing second in 2013. He was part of the 2014 Winter Paralympics torch relay.
