= Angus Cooper =

New Zealand hammer thrower

Personal information
- Nationality: New Zealander
- Born: 7 May 1964 (age 61)

Sport
- Sport: Athletics
- Event: Hammer thrower

Angus James Cooper (born 7 May 1964) is a retired male hammer thrower from New Zealand. At the 1990 Commonwealth Games in Auckland he won a bronze medal in the men's hammer throw with a throw of 71.26m. He is the New Zealand national record holder with 73.10m but his best distance was 73.96m which was not ratified as a record for unknown reasons.

Cooper is from Auckland, New Zealand. He was an All-American thrower for the Kent State Golden Flashes track and field team, finishing 3rd in the weight throw at the 1988 NCAA Division I Indoor Track and Field Championships.

Cooper finished second behind David Smith in the hammer throw event at the British 1987 AAA Championships.

In 1990, Cooper was awarded the New Zealand 1990 Commemoration Medal.

== Achievements ==
Year	Competition	Venue	Position	Notes
Representing New Zealand
1987	World Championships	Rome, Italy	26th	63.64 m
1990	Commonwealth Games	Auckland, New Zealand	3rd	71.26 m
1991	World Championships	Tokyo, Japan	21st	68.48 m
1994	Commonwealth Games	Victoria, Canada	5	67.92 m
