= Savvas Saritzoglou =

Greek hammer thrower (born 1971)

Personal information
- Born: July 19, 1971 (age 55) Athens, Greece

Sport
- Sport: Track and field
Medal record
Representing Greece
Mediterranean Games
Bronze medal – third place	1991 Athens	Hammer throw

Savvas Saritzoglou (Greek: Σάββας Σαριτζόγλου; born July 19, 1971) is a Greek male hammer thrower. He competed at the 1992 Summer Olympics in Barcelona, Spain, placing 13th in the qualifying round. Saritzoglou had a personal best throw of 76.44 metres (250 ft 9 in) in 1994.

== Achievements ==
Year	Competition	Venue	Position	Notes
Representing Greece
1989	European Junior Championships	Varaždin, FR Yugoslavia	2nd	67.68 m
1990	World Junior Championships	Plovdiv, Bulgaria	2nd	70.32 m
1991	Mediterranean Games	Athens, Greece	3rd	70.06 m
1991	World Championships	Tokyo, Japan	18th	70.60 m
1992	Olympic Games	Barcelona, Spain	13th	74.16 m
1993	Summer Universiade	Buffalo, United States	6th	72.98 m
1993	World Championships	Stuttgart, Germany	17th	71.76 m
