= Plamen Minev =

Bulgarian hammer thrower

Personal information
- Born: April 28, 1965 (age 61) Sofia, Bulgaria

Sport
- Sport: Track and field

Plamen Mikhaylov Minev (Bulgarian: Пламен Михайлов Минев; born April 28, 1965) is a former hammer thrower from Bulgaria, who competed for his native country at two consecutive Summer Olympics, starting in 1988. He set his personal best (82.40 metres) in 1991.

== Achievements ==
Year	Competition	Venue	Position	Notes
Representing Bulgaria
1987	World Championships	Rome, Italy	8th	77.06 m
1988	Olympic Games	Seoul, South Korea	14th	74.46 m
1990	European Championships	Split, Yugoslavia	6th	77.12 m
1991	World Championships	Tokyo, Japan	12th	68.70 m
1992	Olympic Games	Barcelona, Spain	21st	69.90 m
1995	World Championships	Gothenburg, Sweden	19th	72.60 m
