= Johann Lindner =

Austrian hammer thrower and bobsledder (born 1959)

Johann "Hans" Lindner (born 3 May 1959 in Tragail, Paternion, Carinthia) is a retired hammer thrower from Austria, who represented his native country in three consecutive Summer Olympics, starting in 1984. He also competed at the Winter Olympics, in 1984 as a bobsledder.

== Achievements ==
| Year | Competition | Venue | Position | Notes |
Representing Austria
| 1983 | World Championships | Helsinki, Finland | — | NM |
| 1984 | Olympic Games | Los Angeles, California | 10th | 71.28 m |
| 1988 | Olympic Games | Seoul, South Korea | 10th | 75.36 m |
| 1990 | European Championships | Split, Yugoslavia | 10th | 73.68 m |
| 1991 | World Championships | Tokyo, Japan | 14th | 72.90 m |
| 1992 | Olympic Games | Barcelona, Spain | 9th | 75.14 m |
| 1993 | World Championships | Stuttgart, Germany | 18th | 71.46 m |
