= David Smith (hammer thrower, born 1962) =

British hammer thrower

Dave Smith
Personal information
- Nationality: British (English)
- Born: 21 June 1962 (age 64) Kingston upon Hull, East Riding of Yorkshire, England
- Height: 193 cm (6 ft 4 in)
- Weight: 115 kg (254 lb)

Sport
- Sport: Athletics
- Event: Hammer throw
- Club: Hull Spartan, Kingston upon Hull
Medal record
Athletics
Representing England
Commonwealth Games
Gold medal – first place	1986 Edinburgh	hammer
Silver medal – second place	1990 Auckland	hammer

David Smith (born 21 June 1962 in Kingston upon Hull, East Riding of Yorkshire) is a retired hammer thrower who competed for Great Britain at the 1988 Summer Olympics.

== Biography ==
Smith, a member of Hull Spartan, finished third behind Martin Girvan in the hammer throw event at the 1981 AAA Championships.

Smith became the British hammer throw champion after winning the British AAA Championships title at the 1984 AAA Championships and would go on to defend his title very year from 1985 to 1988. Smith set his personal best (77.30 metres) in 1985.

He represented England and won a gold medal, at the 1986 Commonwealth Games in Edinburgh, Scotland.

At the 1988 Olympic Games in Seoul, he represented Great Britain in the men's hammer throw event, finishing in 23rd place, having thrown 69.12 metres in the qualifying round. Two years later he represented England and won a silver medal, at the 1990 Commonwealth Games in Auckland, New Zealand.

In addition to his five AAA titles, he won the UK Athletics Championships four times in 1984, 1985, 1987 and 1988.

== Personal life ==
He is the father of active British hammer thrower Alex Smith.

== International competitions ==
Year	Competition	Venue	Position	Notes
Representing Great Britain and England
1986	Commonwealth Games	Edinburgh, United Kingdom	1st	74.06 m
1986	European Championships	Stuttgart, West Germany	16th (q)	73.58 m
1987	World Championships	Rome, Italy	23rd (q)	68.56 m
1988	Olympic Games	Seoul, South Korea	23rd (q)	69.12 m
1990	Commonwealth Games	Auckland, New Zealand	2nd	73.52 m
