= Martin Girvan =

British hammer thrower

Personal information
- Nationality: British
- Born: 17 April 1960 (age 66) Southend-on-Sea, England
- Height: 1.94 m (6 ft 4 1/2 in)
- Weight: 118 kg (260 lb)

Sport
- Sport: Athletics
- Event: Hammer throw
- Club: Wolverhampton & Bilston AC
Medal record
Men's Athletics
Representing Northern Ireland
Commonwealth Games
Silver medal – second place	1982 Brisbane	Hammer throw
Silver medal – second place	1986 Edinburgh	Hammer throw

Martin Girvan (born 17 April 1960) is a British former athlete who specialised in the hammer throw. He represented both Great Britain and Northern Ireland in international competition.

== Biography ==
Girvan had a personal best throw of 77.54m, set in Wolverhampton 1984, breaking both the British and Commonwealth records. His British record stood for 31-years.

He competed at the 1984 Summer Olympics in Los Angeles and finished ninth in the final. His best attempt of 72.32m was registered with his second throw.

In addition to his Olympic appearance he also won silver medals at the 1982 and 1986 Commonwealth Games and was twice British hammer throw champion after winning the British AAA Championships titles at the 1980 AAA Championships and 1981 AAA Championships.

== Claims on doping ==
Outspoken against drugs in sport, in the late 1980s he made allegations of drug taking and cover-up in athletics. Girvan claimed that earlier in the decade, in order to test suspicions he had, he asked British athletics official Andy Norman prior to testing at a meet in Crystal Palace that his results would be "embarrassing", which he says prompted Norman to organise for his urine sample to be switched with another.

In another allegation, Girvan stated that leading hammer thrower Yuriy Sedykh once advised him on what type of drugs to take, during a coaching seminar.

Both Norman and Sedykh denied the allegations.
