= List of British records in athletics =

British records in athletics are the best performances in athletics events by athletes representing the United Kingdom which are ratified by UK Athletics (UKA).

== History ==
The idea of a "British Record" was instituted by the AAA in 1887 for performance made in the United Kingdom, by athletes from anywhere in the world. This type of record was superseded in 1948 by the British (All-Comers') Record, and then by the United Kingdom (All-Comers') Record in 1960.

A "British (National) Record" was instituted by the British Amateur Athletic Board (BAAB) in 1948 for performances made in the United Kingdom, by athletes born in the British Commonwealth. This record type was discontinued in 1960 when the BAAB instituted "United Kingdom (National) Records" which defined performances made anywhere in the world by athletes eligible to represent the United Kingdom in international competition.

Alongside this, the AAA defined "English Native Records" in 1928 as performances made in England or Wales by athletes born in England or Wales. This was superseded in 1960 by "AAA National Records" – performances made in England or Wales by athletes born in England or Wales, or by bona fide members of clubs under the jurisdiction of the AAA whose fathers were born in England or Wales.

== Key to tables ==
Awaiting ratification Record not kept by UKA Not ratified or later rescinded by UKA

Performances marked with an asterisk (*) maybe a) not ratifiable or b) currently under further review
! = timing by photo-electric cell
# = not recognised by federation
est = estimate

== Outdoor ==
=== Men ===
Event	Record	Athlete	Date	Meet	Place	Ref.
100 y	9.30 (+1.6 m/s)	Linford Christie	8 July 1994		Edinburgh, Great Britain	
100 m	9.83 (+1.3 m/s)	Zharnel Hughes	24 June 2023	USATF New York Grand Prix	New York City, United States	
150 m (straight)	14.66 (+0.3 m/s)	Zharnel Hughes	18 May 2024	Atlanta City Games	Atlanta, United States	
150 m (bend)	14.93+ (+0.3 m/s)	John Regis	20 August 1993	World Championships	Stuttgart, Germany	
200 m	19.73 (+1.6 m/s)	Zharnel Hughes	23 July 2023	Anniversary Games	London, United Kingdom	
200 m (straight)	19.93 (−0.3 m/s)	Zharnel Hughes	23 May 2021	Adidas Boost Boston Games	Boston, United States	
300 m	31.56	Douglas Walker	19 July 1998		Gateshead, United Kingdom	
400 m	43.44	Matthew Hudson-Smith	7 August 2024	Olympic Games	Saint-Denis, France	
500 m	59.02	Martyn Rooney	10 September 2016	Great North CityGames	Newcastle, United Kingdom	
600 m	1:14.95	Steve Heard	14 July 1991		London, United Kingdom	
800 m	1:41.73	Sebastian Coe	10 June 1981		Florence, Italy	
1000 m	2:12.18	Sebastian Coe	11 July 1981	Bislett Games	Oslo, Norway	
1500 m	3:27.62+	Josh Kerr	18 July 2026	London Athletics Meet	London, United Kingdom	
Mile	3:42.66	Josh Kerr	18 July 2026	London Athletics Meet	London, United Kingdom	
2000 m	4:51.39	Steve Cram	4 August 1985		Budapest, Hungary	
3000 m	7:32.62	Mo Farah	5 June 2016	British Grand Prix	Birmingham, United Kingdom	
Two miles	8:07.85	Mo Farah	24 August 2014	British Grand Prix	Birmingham, United Kingdom	
5000 m	12:46.59	George Mills	12 June 2025	Bislett Games	Oslo, Norway	
10,000 m	26:46.57	Mo Farah	3 June 2011	Prefontaine Classic	Eugene, United States	
20,000 m	56:20.30+	Mo Farah	4 September 2020	Memorial van Damme	Brussels, Belgium	
One hour	21,330 m	Mo Farah	4 September 2020	Memorial van Damme	Brussels, Belgium	
25,000 m	1:15:22.60	Ron Hill	21 July 1965		Bolton, United Kingdom	
30,000 m	1:31:30.40	Jim Alder	5 September 1970		London, United Kingdom	
Two hours	37,994 m	Jim Alder	17 August 1964		Walton-on-Thames, United Kingdom	
50,000 m	2:48:06	Jeff Norman	7 June 1980		Timperley, United Kingdom	
100 km	6:10:20	Don Ritchie	28 August 1976		London, United Kingdom	
100 miles	11:30:51+	Don Ritchie	15 August 1977		London, United Kingdom	
24 hours	281.303 km	Matt Field	25 August 2024	Gloucester 24hr Track	Gloucester, England	
48 hours	401.208 km	Richard Brown	9 May 1991		Surgères, France	
110 m hurdles	12.91 (+0.5 m/s)	Colin Jackson	20 August 1993	World Championships	Stuttgart, Germany	
200 m hurdles	22.63 (−0.3 m/s)	Colin Jackson	1 June 1991		Cardiff, United Kingdom	
200 m hurdles (straight)	22.10 (+2.0 m/s) ^{[WB]}	Andy Turner	15 May 2011	Great CityGames Manchester	Manchester, United Kingdom	
300 m hurdles	34.48	Chris Rawlinson	30 June 2002		Sheffield, United Kingdom	
400 m hurdles	47.82	Kriss Akabusi	6 August 1992	Olympic Games	Barcelona, Spain	
2000 m steeplechase	5:19.86	Mark Rowland	28 August 1988		London, United Kingdom	
3000 m steeplechase	8:07.96	Mark Rowland	30 September 1988	Olympic Games	Seoul, South Korea	
High jump	2.37 m	Steve Smith	20 September 1992		Seoul, South Korea	
High jump	2.37 m	Steve Smith	22 August 1993	World Championships	Stuttgart, Germany	
High jump	2.37 m	Robbie Grabarz	23 August 2012	Athletissima	Lausanne, Switzerland	
Pole vault	5.85 m	Harry Coppell	4 September 2020	British Championships	Manchester, United Kingdom	
Long jump	8.51 m (+1.7 m/s)	Greg Rutherford	24 April 2014		Chula Vista, United States	
Triple jump	18.29 m (+1.3 m/s)	Jonathan Edwards	7 August 1995	World Championships	Gothenburg, Sweden	
Shot put	21.68 m	Geoff Capes	18 May 1980		Cwmbran, United Kingdom	
Shot put	21.92 m	Carl Myerscough	13 June 2003		Sacramento, United States	
Discus throw	71.88 m	Lawrence Okoye	11 April 2026	Oklahoma Throws Series World Invitational	Ramona, United States	
Hammer throw	80.26 m	Nick Miller	8 April 2018	Commonwealth Games	Gold Coast, Australia	
Javelin throw	91.46 m	Steve Backley	25 January 1992		Auckland, New Zealand	
Weight throw	23.08 m	Matt Mileham	16 February 1985		Fresno, United States	
Pentathlon	3841 pts	Barry King	20 May 1970		Santa Barbara, United States	
Decathlon	8847 pts	Daley Thompson	8–9 August 1984	Olympic Games	Los Angeles, United States	
Decathlon	100m (wind) / Long jump (wind) / Shot put / High jump / 400m / 110m H (wind) / Discus / Pole vault / Javelin / 1500m; 10.44 / 8.01 m / 15.72 m / 2.03 m / 46.97 / 14.33 / 46.56 m / 5.00 m / 65.24 m / 4:35.00					
Double Decathlon	12043 pts	John Heanley	24 September 2000		Hexham, United Kingdom	
4 × 100 m relay	37.36	Adam Gemili; Zharnel Hughes; Richard Kilty; Nethaneel Mitchell-Blake	5 October 2019	World Championships	Doha, Qatar	
4 × 200 m relay	1:21.29	Marcus Adam; Ade Mafe; Linford Christie; John Regis	23 June 1989		Birmingham, United Kingdom	
4 × 400 m relay	2:55.83	Great Britain; Alex Haydock-Wilson; Matthew Hudson-Smith; Lewis Davey; Charlie Dobson	10 August 2024	Olympic Games	Paris, France	
4 × 800 m relay	7:03.89	Peter Elliott; Garry Cook; Steve Cram; Sebastian Coe	30 August 1982		London, United Kingdom	
4 × 1500 m relay	14:54.57	Andrew Baddeley; Ricky Stevenson; Nick McCormick; Mark Draper	4 September 2009	Memorial Van Damme	Brussels, Belgium	
4 × mile relay	16:17.4	Western Kentucky University; Erwin Hartel; Chris Ridler; Tony Staynings; Nick Rose	25 April 1975	Drake Relays	Des Moines, United States	

==== Walking ====
Event	Data	Athlete	Date	Meet	Place	Ref.
1500 m	5:46.24	Roger Mills	29 August 1975		London, United Kingdom	
Mile walk	5:31.08 ^{[WB]}	Tom Bosworth	9 July 2017	London Grand Prix	London, United Kingdom	
3000 m	10:43.84	Tom Bosworth	21 July 2018	Diamond League	London, United Kingdom	
5000 m	18:41.23	Callum Wilkinson	24 August 2019	British Championships	Birmingham, United Kingdom	
10,000 m	38:43.91	Callum Wilkinson	30 June 2024	British Championships	Manchester, United Kingdom	
15,000 m	1:02:40.0+	Ian McCombie	15 May 1992		Fana, Norway	
20,000 m	1:23:26.5	Ian McCombie	26 May 1990		Fana, Norway	
25,000 m	1:55:00.8+	Ron Wallwork	31 July 1971		Blackburn, United Kingdom	
30,000 m	2:11:54	Chris Maddocks	31 December 1989		Plymouth, United Kingdom	
35,000 m	2:43:12+	Chris Maddocks	22 September 1984		Birmingham, United Kingdom	
40,000 m	3:10:48+	Chris Maddocks	22 September 1984		Birmingham, United Kingdom	
50,000 m	4:05:44.6	Paul Blagg	26 May 1990		Fana, Norway	
100,000 m	9:41:54+	Ed Shillabeer	15 September 1985		Colchester, United Kingdom	
Hour walk	14324 m+	Ian McCombie	7 July 1985		London, United Kingdom	
2 hours walk	27262 m+	Chris Maddocks	31 December 1989		Plymouth, United Kingdom	
24 hours walk	214.061 km	Hew Neilson	15 October 1960		Walton-on-Thames, United Kingdom	

=== Women ===
Event	Record	Athlete	Date	Meet	Place	Ref.	Video
100 y	10.73 (+0.3 m/s)	Heather Young	20 July 1958		Cardiff, Great Britain		
100 m	10.83 (+0.1 m/s)	Dina Asher-Smith	29 September 2019	World Championships	Doha, Qatar		
100 m	10.83 (+0.8 m/s)	Dina Asher-Smith	17 July 2022	World Championships	Eugene, United States		
150 m (bend)	16.42+ (−0.4 m/s)	Dina Asher-Smith	28 August 2025	Weltklasse Zürich	Zurich, Switzerland		
150 m (straight)	16.44 (±0.0 m/s)	Daryll Neita	18 May 2024	Atlanta City Games	Atlanta, United States		
200 m	21.88 (+0.9 m/s)	Dina Asher-Smith	2 October 2019	World Championships	Doha, Qatar		
200 m (straight)	23.29 (+0.2 m/s)	Emily Freeman	16 May 2010	Great CityGames Manchester	Manchester, United Kingdom		
300 m	35.46	Kathy Cook	18 August 1984		London, United Kingdom		
400 m	49.29	Amber Anning	9 August 2024	Olympic Games	Saint-Denis, France		
500 m	1:06.62 (Note: road race)	Lynsey Sharp	10 September 2016	Great North CityGames	Newcastle, United Kingdom		
600 m	1:24.36	Marilyn Okoro	5 July 2012	Meeting de la Province de Liège	Liège, Belgium		
800 m	1:54.33	Keely Hodgkinson	7 June 2026	Bauhausgalan	Stockholm, Sweden		
1000 m	2:30.82	Laura Muir	14 August 2020	Herculis	Fontvieille, Monaco		
1500 m	3:52.61	Georgia Bell	10 August 2024	Olympic Games	Saint-Denis, France		
Mile	4:15.24	Laura Muir	21 July 2023	Herculis	Fontvieille, Monaco		
2000 m	5:26.08	Melissa Courtney-Bryant	12 July 2024	Herculis	Fontvieille, Monaco		
3000 m	8:22.20	Paula Radcliffe	19 July 2002	Herculis	Fontvieille, Monaco		
Two miles	9:17.40+	Paula Radcliffe	20 June 2004	European Cup	Bydgoszcz, Poland		
5000 m	14:28.55	Eilish McColgan	1 July 2021	Bislett Games	Oslo, Norway		
10,000 m	30:00.86	Eilish McColgan	4 March 2023	Sound Running TEN	San Juan Capistrano, United States		
20,000 m	1:15:46.00+	Carolyn Hunter-Rowe	6 March 1994		Barry, United Kingdom		
25,000 m	1:35:15.5+	Carolyn Hunter-Rowe	6 March 1994		Barry, United Kingdom		
30,000 m	1:55:02.3+	Carolyn Hunter-Rowe	6 March 1994		Barry, United Kingdom		
50,000 m	3:18:52+	Carolyn Hunter-Rowe	6 March 1994		Barry, United Kingdom		
40 miles	4:26:43	Carolyn Hunter-Rowe	7 March 1993		Barry, United Kingdom		
50 miles	6:12:11+	Hilary Walker	16 October 1993	Self-Transcendence 24 Hour Track Race	London, United Kingdom		
100 km	8:01:39	Hilary Walker	4 April 1993		London, United Kingdom		
100 miles	14:34:03 (Note: by UKA source; 14:34:05 by other sources)	Samantha Amend	24 April 2021	Centurion Running Track 100 Mile	Ashford, United Kingdom		
One hour	16495 m Mx	Michaela McCallum	2 April 2000		Asti, Italy		
One hour	17050 m Wo	Alice Wright	30 October 2021	HOKA Northern Arizona Elite	Phoenix, United States		
Two hours	31200 m	Carolyn Hunter-Rowe	6 March 1994		Barry, United Kingdom		
24 hours	240.169 km	Eleanor Adams	20 August 1989		Melbourne, Australia		
48 hours	366.512 km	Hilary Walker	7 November 1988		Blackpool, United Kingdom		
100 m hurdles	12.50 (+0.9 m/s)	Cindy Sember	24 July 2022	World Championships	Eugene, United States		
200 m hurdles (bend)	26.68	Sharon Colyear	16 July 1971		London, United Kingdom		
200 m hurdles (straight)	25.05 (+1.0 m/s)	Meghan Beesley	17 May 2014	Manchester City Games	Manchester, United Kingdom		
300 m hurdles	38.75	Lina Nielsen	26 May 2023	Aufbaumeeting Krumme Strecken	St. Pölten, Austria		
400 m hurdles	52.74	Sally Gunnell	19 August 1993	World Championships	Stuttgart, Germany		
2000 m steeplechase	6:27.33	Lennie Waite	20 May 2010	Rice University All Comers Meeting	Houston, United States		
3000 m steeplechase	9:04.35	Elizabeth Bird	6 August 2024	Olympic Games	Saint-Denis, France		
High jump	2.00 m	Morgan Lake	27 August 2025	Weltklasse Zürich	Zurich, Switzerland		
Pole vault	4.92 m	Molly Caudery	22 June 2024	Toulouse Capitole Perche	Toulouse, France		
Long jump	7.07 m (+0.4 m/s)	Shara Proctor	28 August 2015	World Championships	Beijing, China		
Triple jump	15.15 m (+1.7 m/s)	Ashia Hansen	13 September 1997	Grand Prix Final	Fukuoka, Japan		
Shot put	19.36 m	Judy Oakes	14 August 1988	British Grand Prix	Gateshead, United Kingdom		
Weight throw	20.63 m	Shirley Webb	2 August 2005		Eton, United Kingdom		
Discus throw	67.48 m	Meg Ritchie	26 April 1981	Mt. SAC Relays	Walnut, United States		
Hammer throw	74.54 m	Sophie Hitchon	15 August 2016	Olympic Games	Rio de Janeiro, Brazil		
Javelin throw	66.17 m	Goldie Sayers	14 July 2012	London Grand Prix	London, United Kingdom		
Javelin throw	The specification for the women's javelin changed in 1999. With the old model, Fatima Whitbread threw 77.44 m in 1986.						
Pentathlon	4402 pts	Sue Longden	24 May 1980		Birmingham, United Kingdom		
Heptathlon	6981 pts	Katarina Johnson-Thompson	2–4 October 2019	World Championships	Doha, Qatar		
Heptathlon	100m H (wind) / High jump / Shot put / 200m (wind) / Long jump (wind) / Javelin / 800m; 13.09 (+0.6 m/s) / 1.95 m / 13.86 m / 23.08 (+1.0 m/s) / 6.77 m (+0.2 m/s) / 43.93 m / 2:07.26						
Decathlon	6878 pts	Jessica Taylor	12–13 September 2015	Kent County Multi-Events Championships	Erith, United Kingdom		
Decathlon	100m (wind) / Long jump (wind) / Shot put / High jump / 400m / 100m H (wind) / Discus / Pole vault / Javelin / 1500m; 12.30 (−2.7 m/s) / 5.96 m (+0.2 m/s) / 11.48 m / 1.63 m / 55.12 / 14.61 (−1.5 m/s) / 28.77 m / 2.50 m / 34.76 m / 5:44.32						
Double Heptathlon	9152 pts	Charmaine Johnson	23 September 1990		Espoo, Finland		
5000 m walk	21:30.75	Johanna Jackson	13 July 2008		Birmingham, United Kingdom		
10,000 m walk	45:09.57	Lisa Kehler	13 August 2000		Birmingham, United Kingdom		
20 km walk (road)	1:30:41	Johanna Jackson	19 June 2010	Gran Premio Cantones de Marcha	A Coruña, Spain		
35 km walk (road)	2:58:48	Bethan Davies	23 April 2022	Dudinská Päťdesiatka	Dudince, Slovakia		
4 × 100 m relay	41.55	Great Britain; Asha Philip; Imani Lansiquot; Dina Asher-Smith; Daryll Neita	5 August 2021	Olympic Games	Tokyo, Japan		
4 × 100 m relay	41.55	Great Britain; Dina Asher-Smith; Imani Lansiquot; Amy Hunt; Daryll Neita	20 July 2024	London Athletics Meet	London, United Kingdom		
4 × 200 m relay	1:29.61	Great Britain; Desiree Henry; Anyika Onuora; Bianca Williams; Asha Philip	25 May 2014	IAAF World Relays	Nassau, Bahamas		
4 × 400 m relay	3:19.72	Great Britain; Victoria Ohuruogu; Laviai Nielsen; Nicole Yeargin; Amber Anning	10 August 2024	Olympic Games	Saint-Denis, France		
4 × 800 m relay	8:13.46	Marilyn Okoro; Lynsey Sharp; Jemma Simpson; Tara Bird	27 April 2013	Penn Relays	Philadelphia, United States		

=== Mixed ===
Event	Record	Athlete	Date	Meet	Place	Ref.
4 × 100 m relay	40.88	Great Britain; Asha Philip; Kissiwaa Mensah; Jeriel Quainoo; Joe Ferguson	11 May 2025	World Relays	Guangzhou, China	
4 × 400 m relay	3:08.01	Great Britain; Samuel Reardon; Laviai Nielsen; Alex Haydock-Wilson; Amber Anning	3 August 2024	Olympic Games	Saint-Denis, France	

== Road ==
=== Men ===
Event	Record	Athlete	Date	Meet	Place	Ref.
Mile (road)	3:51.3 h	Elliot Giles	1 September 2024	New Balance Kö Meile	Düsseldorf, Germany	
Mile (road)	3:44.3 a	Josh Kerr	8 September 2024	New Balance Fifth Avenue Mile	New York City, United States	
5 km	13:16	Sam Atkin	19 March 2023		Lille, France	
8 km	21:45+	Mo Farah	22 March 2015	Lisbon Half Marathon	Lisbon, Portugal	
5 miles	22:17+	Steve Jones	24 April 1984		Birmingham, United Kingdom	
10 km	27:20 a #	Jon Brown	24 September 1995		Pittsburgh, United States	
10 km	27:34 a	Nick Rose	1 April 1984	Crescent City Classic	New Orleans, United States	
10 km	27:38	Rory Leonard	12 January 2025	10K Valencia Ibercaja	Valencia, Spain	
10 km	27:38	Joe Wigfield	11 January 2026	10K Valencia Ibercaja by Kiprun	Valencia, Spain	
12 km	34:01	Peter Whitehead	26 December 1994		Cali, Colombia	
14 km	39:25+	Mo Farah	22 March 2015	Lisbon Half Marathon	Lisbon, Portugal	
15 km	42:03+	Mo Farah	26 March 2016	World Half Marathon Championships	Cardiff, United Kingdom	
10 miles	45:14	Charles Hicks	6 April 2025	USA 10 Mile Road Running Championships	Washington, United States	
10 miles	45:13 #	Ian Stewart	8 May 1977		Stoke, United Kingdom	
18 km	47:50+	Mo Farah	22 March 2015	Lisbon Half Marathon	Lisbon, Portugal	
20 km	56:27+	Mo Farah	22 March 2015	Lisbon Half Marathon	Lisbon, Portugal	
Half marathon	59:32	Mo Farah	22 March 2015	Lisbon Half Marathon	Lisbon, Portugal	
Half marathon	59:07 a	Mo Farah	8 September 2019	Great North Run	Newcastle upon Tyne-South Shields, United Kingdom	
25 km	1:12:36+	Mo Farah	22 April 2018	London Marathon	London, United Kingdom	
30 km	1:27:31+	Mo Farah	22 April 2018	London Marathon	London, United Kingdom	
20 miles	1:35:22+ a	Steve Jones	20 August 1985	Chicago Marathon	Chicago, United States	
Marathon	2:05:11	Mo Farah	7 October 2018	Chicago Marathon	Chicago, United States	
50 km	2:46:09	Alex Milne	14 March 2026	IAU 50 km World Championships	New Delhi, India	
100 km	6:19:20	Steve Way	3 May 2014		Gravesend, United Kingdom	
100 miles	11:51:12	Don Ritchie	15 June 1979		New York City, United States	
24 hours	254.823 km	Paul Bream	31 May 1987		Bray, Ireland	
48 hours	401.548 km	Richard Brown	May 1991		Surgères, France	
Marathon relay	1:59:14	Carl Thackery; Jon Solly; Mark Scrutton; Dave Clarke; Karl Harrison	30 November 1996		Hiroshima, Japan	

==== Walking ====
Event	Data	Athlete	Date	Meet	Place	Ref.
5 km	19:29	Andi Drake	27 May 1990		Søfteland, Norway	
5 miles	32:38+	Ian McCombie	23 March 1985		York, United Kingdom	
10 km	39:36	Tom Bosworth	1 March 2015		Coventry, United Kingdom	
15 km walk	1:00:22+	Tom Bosworth	19 March 2016	Dudinska Patdesiatka	Dudince, Slovakia	
10 miles	1:06:15+	Steve Barry	26 February 1983		Douglas, United Kingdom	
20 km	1:19:38	Tom Bosworth	8 April 2018	Commonwealth Games	Gold Coast, Australia	
25 km	1:46:16+	Ian McCombie	27 April 1986		Edinburgh, United Kingdom	
30 km	2:07:56	Ian McCombie	27 April 1986		Edinburgh, United Kingdom	
20 miles	2:30:35	Paul Nihill	12 June 1971		Sheffield, United Kingdom	
35 km	2:36:19	Chris Maddocks	29 June 1991		Örnsköldsvik, Sweden	
40 km	3:02:55+	Chris Maddocks	28 October 1990		Burrator, United Kingdom	
50 km	3:51:13	Dominic King	20 March 2021	Dudinská Päťdesiatka	Dudince, Slovakia	
100 km	9:34:25	Tony Geal	2 June 1979		Grand-Quevilly, France	
24 hours	219.570 km	Derek Harrison	21 May 1978		Rouen, France	

=== Women ===
Event	Record	Athlete	Date	Meet	Place	Ref.
Mile	4:23.25	Jemma Reekie	6 September 2026	New Balance Kö Meile	Düsseldorf, Germany	
Mile	4:13.8 a	Jemma Reekie	13 September 2026	New Balance Fifth Avenue Mile	New York City, United States	
5 km	14:45 Mx	Eilish McColgan	24 April 2022	Meta : Time : Trials	Málaga, Spain	
5 km	14:48 Wo	Eilish McColgan	12 February 2022	Super Sports Meydan Run	Dubai, United Arab Emirates	
5 km	14:41 Mx (Note: unratificable by World Athletics because no drug test after race)	Beth Potter	3 April 2021	Podium 5k Sub-15.30	Barrowford, United Kingdom	
8 km	24:05+	Paula Radcliffe	23 February 2003		San Juan, Puerto Rico	
5 miles (8.0 km)	24:47	Paula Radcliffe	24 April 1999		Balmoral, United Kingdom	
10 km	30:07 Mx	Megan Keith	22 February 2026	10K Facsa Castelló	Castellón de la Plana, Spain	
10 km	30:19 Wo	Eilish McColgan	22 May 2022	Great Manchester Run	Manchester, United Kingdom	
12 km	39:20	Liz McColgan	17 October 1987		Irving, United States	
15 km	46:40+ Mx	Eilish McColgan	2 April 2023	Berlin Half Marathon	Berlin, Germany	
10 miles	50:01+ a	Paula Radcliffe	21 September 2003		Newcastle–South Shields, United Kingdom	
10 miles	50:43	Eilish McColgan	17 October 2021	Great South Run	Portsmouth, United Kingdom	
20 km	1:02:21+ a est	Paula Radcliffe	21 September 2003		Newcastle–South Shields, United Kingdom	
Half marathon	1:05:43 Mx	Eilish McColgan	2 April 2023	Berlin Half Marathon	Berlin, Germany	
Half marathon	1:06:47 Wo	Paula Radcliffe	7 October 2001	World Half Marathon Championships	Bristol, United Kingdom	
Half marathon	1:05:39.6 a	Paula Radcliffe	21 September 2003		Newcastle–South Shields, United Kingdom	
25 km	1:20:36+ a (Note: London course classified as downhill to 30 km up to 2004)	Paula Radcliffe	13 April 2003	London Marathon	London, United Kingdom	
25 km	1:22:47+	Paula Radcliffe	14 August 2005	World Championships	Helsinki, Finland	
30 km	1:36:36+ a (Note: London course classified as downhill to 30 km up to 2004)	Paula Radcliffe	13 April 2003	London Marathon	London, United Kingdom	
30 km	1:37:27+	Paula Radcliffe	17 April 2005	London Marathon	London, United Kingdom	
30 km	1:39:22+	Paula Radcliffe	14 August 2005	World Championships	Helsinki, Finland	
30 km	1:43:24	Mara Yamauchi	21 February 2010	Ōme 30 km Road Race	Ōme, Japan	
20 miles (32 km)	1:43:33+ a (Note: London course classified as downhill to 30 km up to 2004)	Paula Radcliffe	13 April 2003	London Marathon	London, United Kingdom	
Marathon	2:15:25 (Note: London course classified as downhill to 30 km up to 2004)	Paula Radcliffe	13 April 2003	London Marathon	London, United Kingdom	
50 km	3:07:20	Alyson Dixon	1 September 2019	50 km World Championships	Brașov, Romania	
100 km	7:03:40	Sarah Webster	2 April 2023	Anglo Celtic Plate 100k	Craigavon, Northern Ireland	
100 miles (160 km)	14:46:29+	Liz Hawker	23 September 2011		Llandudno, United Kingdom	
100 miles (160 km)	14:43:40+	Eleanor Adams-Robinson	4 February 1990		Milton Keynes, United Kingdom	
24 hours	278.621 km (Note: by IAU source; 278.622 by other sources)	Sarah Webster	19 October 2025	IAU 24 Hour World Championship	Albi, France	
48 hours	411.458 km	Joasia Zakrzewski	12 February 2023	Taipei 24-Hour	Taipei, Taiwan	
Marathon Relay	2:17:31	Bev Nicholson; Jill Hunter; Laura Adam; Marian Sutton; Nicky Morris; Andrea Whitcombe	23 February 1992		Yokohama, Japan	

== Indoor ==
=== Men ===
Event	Record	Athlete	Date	Meet	Place	Ref.	Video
50 m	5.61+*	Jason Gardener	16 February 2000		Madrid, Spain		
50 m	5.66	Jason Gardener	21 February 1999	Meeting Pas de Calais	Liévin, France		
55 m	6.21 A	John Regis	30 January 1993		Reno, United States		
60 m	6.42	Dwain Chambers	7 March 2009	European Championships	Turin, Italy		
200 m	20.25	Linford Christie	19 February 1995	Meeting Pas de Calais	Liévin, France		
300 m	32.80	Matthew Hudson-Smith	14 January 2022	UAB Blazer Invitational	Birmingham, United States		
400 m	45.39	Jamie Baulch	9 February 1997	Aviva Indoor Grand Prix	Birmingham, United Kingdom		
500 m	1:01.59	Conrad Williams	25 February 2014	Prague Indoor	Prague, Czech Republic		
600 m	1:15.31 A	Thomas Staines	1 February 2019	New Mexico Collegiate Classic	Albuquerque, United States		
800 m	1:43.63	Elliot Giles	17 February 2021	Copernicus Cup	Toruń, Poland		
1000 m	2:16.74	Neil Gourley	15 February 2025	Keely Klassic	Birmingham, United Kingdom		
1500 m	3:32.48	Neil Gourley	25 February 2023	World Indoor Tour Final	Birmingham, United Kingdom		
Mile	3:48.87	Josh Kerr	27 February 2022	Boston University Last Chance Meet	Boston, United States		
3000 m	7:27.92	George Mills	2 February 2025	Meeting de l'Eure	Val-de-Reuil, France		
Two miles	8:00.67	Josh Kerr	11 February 2024	Millrose Games	New York City, United States		
5000 m	13:08.87	Marc Scott	28 February 2020	BU Last Chance Invitational	Boston, United States		
5000 m	12:57.08	Marc Scott	12 February 2022	David Hemery Valentine Invitational	Boston, United States		
50 m hurdles	6.40	Colin Jackson	5 February 1999		Budapest, Hungary		
55 m hurdles	7.14 A	Anthony Jarrett	30 January 1993		Reno, United States		
60 m hurdles	7.30	Colin Jackson	6 March 1994		Sindelfingen, Germany		
300 m hurdles	36.48 OT	Gary Cadogan	12 February 1996		Tampere, Finland		
400 m hurdles	50.21	Richard Yates	19 February 2011	Aviva Indoor Grand Prix	Birmingham, United Kingdom		
High jump	2.38 m	Steve Smith	4 February 1994	annual "Jump to the Music"	Wuppertal, Germany		
Pole vault	5.83 m	Luke Cutts	25 January 2014	Perche Elite Tour Meeting	Rouen, France		
Long jump	8.26 m A	Greg Rutherford	5 February 2016	New Mexico Collegiate Classic	Albuquerque, United States		
Triple jump	17.75 m	Phillips Idowu	9 March 2008	World Championships	Valencia, Spain		
Shot put	21.49 m	Carl Myerscough	15 March 2003	NCAA Division I Championships	Fayetteville, United States		
Weight throw	24.07 m	Joseph Ellis	11 February 2022	Windy City Invitational	Chicago, United States		
Discus throw	60.99 m	Brett Morse	12 March 2011	4th World Indoor Throwing Competition	Växjö, Sweden		
Javelin throw	76.66 m	Stuart Faben	3 March 1996		Kajaani, Finland		
Heptathlon	6188 pts	Tim Duckworth	9–10 March 2018	NCAA Division I Championships	College Station, United States		
Heptathlon	60m / Long jump / Shot put / High jump / 60m H / Pole vault / 1000m; 6.84 / 7.74 m / 13.59 m / 2.17 m / 8.23 / 5.16 m / 2:56.23						
3000 m walk	10:30.28	Tom Bosworth	25 February 2018	Glasgow Grand Prix	Glasgow, United Kingdom		
5000 m walk	18:20.97	Tom Bosworth	23 February 2020	British Championships	Glasgow, United Kingdom		
4 × 200 m relay	1:22.11	Linford Christie; Darren Braithwaite; Ade Mafe; John Regis	3 March 1991		Glasgow, United Kingdom		
4 × 400 m relay	3:03.20	Allyn Condon; Solomon Wariso; Adrian Patrick; Jamie Baulch	7 March 1999	World Championships	Maebashi, Japan		

=== Women ===
Event	Record	Athlete	Date	Meet	Place	Ref.	Video
50 m	6.21	Wendy Hoyte	22 February 1981	European Championships	Grenoble, France		
60 m	7.03	Dina Asher-Smith	25 February 2023	World Indoor Tour Final	Birmingham, United Kingdom		
60 m	7.03	Dina Asher-Smith	21 March 2026	World Championships	Toruń, Poland		
100 y	10.67	Heather Hunte	17 February 1978		Senftenberg, East Germany		
100 m	11.57	Joice Maduaka	27 February 2010		Florø, Norway		
200 m	22.60	Amber Anning	26 January 2024	Razorback Invitational	Fayetteville, United States		
300 m	36.53	Lina Nielsen	15 February 2025	Keely Klassic	Birmingham, United Kingdom		
400 m	50.02	Nicola Sanders	3 March 2007	European Championships	Birmingham, United Kingdom		
600 m	1:23.41	Keely Hodgkinson	28 January 2023	Manchester World Indoor Tour	Manchester, United Kingdom		
800 m	1:54.87	Keely Hodgkinson	19 February 2026	Meeting Hauts-de-France Pas-de-Calais	Liévin, France		
1000 m	2:31.93	Laura Muir	18 February 2017	Birmingham Indoor Grand Prix	Birmingham, United Kingdom		
1500 m	3:58.53	Georgia Hunter Bell	22 March 2026	World Championships	Toruń, Poland		
Mile	4:17.88	Jemma Reekie	8 February 2020	Millrose Games	New York, United States		
2000 m	5:35.87	Revée Walcott-Nolan	19 February 2026	Meeting Hauts-de-France Pas-de-Calais	Liévin, France		
3000 m	8:26.41	Laura Muir	4 February 2017	Weltklasse in Karlsruhe	Karlsruhe, Germany		
Two miles	9:04.84	Laura Muir	11 February 2024	Millrose Games	New York City, United States		
5000 m	14:49.12	Laura Muir	4 January 2017	Glasgow Miler Meet	Glasgow, United Kingdom		
50 m hurdles	6.83	Tiffany Porter	28 January 2012	US Open	New York City, United States		
60 m hurdles	7.80	Tiffany Porter	4 March 2011	European Championships	Paris, France		
High jump	1.99 m	Morgan Lake	4 February 2023	Hustopečské skákání	Hustopeče, Czech Republic		
Pole vault	4.87 m	Holly Bleasdale	21 January 2012		Villeurbanne, France		
Long jump	7.00 m	Jazmin Sawyers	5 March 2023	European Championships	Istanbul, Turkey		
Triple jump	15.16 m	Ashia Hansen	28 February 1998	European Championships	Valencia, Spain		
Shot put	19.06 m	Venissa Head	7 April 1984		St Athan, United Kingdom		
Weight throw	21.46 m	Amy Herrington	27 February 2021	Summit League Championships	Brookings, United States		
Discus throw	58.97 m	Jade Nicholls	10 March 2012	World Indoor Throwing	Växjö, Sweden		
Pentathlon	5000 pts	Katarina Johnson-Thompson	6 March 2015	European Championships	Prague, Czech Republic		
Pentathlon	60m H / High jump / Shot put / Long jump / 800m; 8.18 / 1.95 m / 12.32 m / 6.89 m / 2:12.78						
3000 m walk	12:44.99	Bethan Davies	28 February 2016		Sheffield, United Kingdom		
3000 m walk	12:35.87 Mx (Note: recognised by World Athletics but not ratified by federation)	Bethan Davies	11 December 2016	Christmas Classic	Cardiff, United Kingdom		
5000 m walk	21:25.37	Bethan Davies	18 February 2018	British Championships	Birmingham, United Kingdom		
4 × 200 m relay	1:33.96	Paula Dunn; Jennifer Stoute; Linda Keough; Sally Gunnell	23 February 1990	Glasgow Indoor International GBR v GDR	Glasgow, United Kingdom		
4 × 400 m relay	3:24.89	Great Britain; Lina Nielsen; Hannah Kelly; Emily Newnham; Amber Anning	9 March 2025	European Championships	Apeldoorn, Netherlands		

=== Mixed ===
Event	Record	Athlete	Date	Meet	Place	Ref.
4 × 400 m relay	3:16.49	Great Britain; Alastair Chalmers; Emily Newnham; Joshua Faulds; Lina Nielsen	6 March 2025	European Championships	Apeldoorn, Netherlands	

== U20 (Junior) records ==
=== Men outdoor ===
Event	Record	Athlete	Date	Meet	Place	Age	Ref.
100 m	10.05 (+0.1 m/s)	Adam Gemili	11 July 2012	World U20 Championships	Barcelona, Spain	18 years, 279 days	
200 m	20.29 (−0.2 m/s)	Christian Malcolm	19 September 1998	Commonwealth Games	Kuala Lumpur, Malaysia	19 years, 108 days	
400 m	45.35	Martyn Rooney	21 Mar 2006	18th Commonwealth Games	Melbourne, Australia	18 years, 352 days	
600 m	1:16.30	Kyle Langford	24 Aug 2014	Sainsbury's Birmingham Grand Prix	Birmingham, United Kingdom	18 years, 203 days	
800 m	1:44.14	Max Burgin	19 May 2021	60th Zlatá Tretra, Golden Spike	Ostrava, Czech Republic	18 years, 364 days	
1000 m	2:18.98	David Sharpe	19 Aug 1986		Birmingham, United Kingdom	19 years, 42 days	
1500 m	3:36.6h	Graham Williamson	17 Jul 1979		Oslo, Norway	19 years, 32 days	
Mile	3:53.15	Graham Williamson	17 Jul 1979		Oslo, Norway	19 years, 32 days	
2000 m	5:06.56	Jon Richards	7 Jul 1982		Oslo, Norway	18 years, 49 days	
3000 m	7:48.28	Jon Richards	9 Jul 1983		Oslo, Norway	19 years, 51 days	
Two miles	8:35.4h	Ian Stewart	3 Jun 1968		London, United Kingdom	19 years, 140 days	
5000 m	13:27.04	Steve Binns	14 Sep 1979		London, United Kingdom	19 years, 20 days	
10,000 m	29:21.9h	Jon Brown	21 Apr 1990		Walnut, United States	19 years, 53 days	
10 km (road)	29:33	James Knockton	5 Mar 2023	Trafford 10K	Partington, United Kingdom	17 years, 357 days	
Half marathon	1:06:07	Seyfu Jamaal	8 Dec 2019		Milton Keynes, United Kingdom	19 years, 33 days	
2000 m steeplechase	5:29.61	Colin Reitz	18 Aug 1979	5th European Junior Championships	Bydgoszcz, Poland	19 years, 134 days	
3000 m steeplechase	8:29.85	Paul Davies-Hale	31 Aug 1981		London, United Kingdom	19 years, 71 days	
110 m hurdles	13.44	Colin Jackson	19 Jul 1986	1st IAAF World Junior Championships	Athens, Greece	19 years, 151 days	
400 m hurdles	50.00	Sam Lunt	30 August 2024	World U20 Championships	Lima, Peru	18 years, 312 days	
High jump	2.37 m	Steve Smith	20 September 1992	World Junior Championships	Seoul, South Korea	19 years, 175 days	
Pole vault	5.60 m	Adam Hague	28 Mar 2015	88h Clyde Littlefield Texas Relays, Mike A. Myers Stadium	Austin, United States	17 years, 211 days	
Long jump	8.14 m	Greg Rutherford	22 Jul 2005	18th European Junior Championships	Kaunas, Lithuania	18 years, 247 days	
Triple jump	16.58 m	Tosi Fasinro	15 Jun 1991		Espoo, Finland	19 years, 79 days	
Shot put	19.46 m	Carl Myerscough	6 Sep 1998		Blackpool, United Kingdom	18 years, 320 days	
Discus throw	60.97 m	Emeka Udechuku	5 Jul 1998		Bedford, United Kingdom	18 years, 360 days	
Hammer throw	73.24 m	Jake Norris	6 Jun 2018	NCAA DI Outdoor Championships	Eugene, United States	18 years, 341 days	
Javelin throw	79.50 m	Steve Backley	5 Jun 1988		Derby, United Kingdom	19 years, 114 days	
Decathlon	8082 pts	Daley Thompson	31 Jul 1977	European Cup Combined Events Semi Final	Sittard, Netherlands	19 years, 1 day	
20 km walk (road)	1:29:48	Dominic King	15 Jun 2002		Dublin, Ireland	19 years, 16 days	
4 × 100 m relay	39.05	Great Britain	22 Oct 2000	8th IAAF World Junior Championships	Santiago, Chile		
4 × 400 m relay	3:03.80	Great Britain	12 Aug 1990	3rd IAAF World Junior Championships	Plovdiv, Bulgaria		

=== Women outdoor ===
Event	Record	Athlete	Date	Meet	Place	Age	Ref.
100 m	11.14	Dina Asher-Smith	5 Jul 2014	21st Bauhaus Juniorengala, Michael-Hoffmann-Stadion	Mannheim, Germany	18 years, 213 days	
200 m	22.42	Amy Hunt	30 Jun 2019	26th Bauhaus Juniorengala	Mannheim, Germany	17 years, 46 days	
400 m	51.16	Linsey MacDonald	15 Jun 1980		London, United Kingdom	16 years, 124 days	
600 m	1:31.23	Carolyn Plateau	21 Aug 2005	Norwich Union IAAF Super Grand Prix, Don Valley Stadium	Sheffield, United Kingdom	16 years, 364 days	
800 m	1:55.88	Keely Hodgkinson	3 Aug 2021	32nd Olympic Games	Tokyo, Japan	19 years, 153 days	
1000 m	2:38.58	Jo White	9 Sep 1977		London, United Kingdom	16 years, 276 days	
1500 m	3:59.96	Zola Pieterse	30 Aug 1985		Brussels, Belgium	19 years, 96 days	
Mile run	4:17.57	Zola Pieterse	21 Aug 1985		Zurich, Switzerland	19 years, 87 days	
2000 m	5:48.87	Philippa Mason	11 Jul 1986		London, United Kingdom	17 years, 117 days	
3000 m	8:28.83	Zola Pieterse	7 Sep 1985	5th Golden Gala, Stadio Olimpico	Rome, Italy	19 years, 104 days	
Two miles	9:29.6 h	Zola Pieterse	6 Sep 1985		London, United Kingdom	19 years, 103 days	
5000 m	14:48.07	Zola Pieterse	26 Aug 1985		London, United Kingdom	19 years, 92 days	
10,000 m	32:36.75	Charlotte Purdue	14 Aug 2010	BMC PB Classic	Tipton, United Kingdom	19 years, 65 days	
10 km (road)	33:00	Natasha Phillips	14 May 2023	Babcock Shettleston 10K (Inc Scottish 10K Championships)	Glasgow, United Kingdom	18 years, 74 days	
Half marathon	1:11:20	Natasha Phillips	27 Aug 2023	Antrim Coast Half Marathon	Larne, United Kingdom	18 years, 179 days	
Marathon	2:42:30	Katelyn Ridgway	3 Oct 2021	Virgin Money London Marathon	London, United Kingdom	19 years, 237 days	
2000 m steeplechase	6:32.45	Louise Webb	14 Jul 2007	5th World Youth Championships	Ostrava, Czech Republic	16 years, 155 days	
3000 m steeplechase	10:06.12	Emily Pidgeon	3 Jul 2005	National Junior Championships	Bedford, United Kingdom	16 years, 32 days	
100 m hurdles	13.07	Alicia Barrett	18 Jun 2017	England Athletics U20 / U23 Championships	Bedford, United Kingdom	19 years, 85 days	
400 m hurdles	56.16	Shona Richards	26 Jul 2014	15th IAAF World Junior Championships	Eugene, United States	18 years, 328 days	
High jump	1.94 m	Morgan Lake	22 Jul 2014	15th World Junior Championships	Eugene, United States	17 years, 71 days	
Pole vault	4.53 m	Molly Caudery	23 Jun 2018	Bauhaus Juniorgala	Mannheim, Germany	18 years, 98 days	
Long jump	6.90 m	Beverly Kinch	14 Aug 1983	1st World Championships	Helsinki, Finland	19 years, 212 days	
Triple jump	13.75 m	Laura Samuel	22 Jul 2010	13th IAAF World Junior Championships	Moncton, Canada	19 years, 153 days	
Shot put	17.128 m	Sophie McKinna	25 May 2013	Hallesche HALPLUS Werfertage, Sportzentrum Brandberge	Halle, Germany	18 years, 267 days	
Discus throw	55.99 m	Zara Obamakinwa	9 Jul 2023	UK Athletics Championships	Manchester, United Kingdom	19 years, 101 days	
Hammer throw	66.01 m	Sophie Hitchon	24 Jul 2010	13th IAAF World Junior Championships	Moncton, Canada	19 years, 13 days	
Javelin throw	55.40 m	Goldie Sayers	22 Jul 2001	16th European Junior Championships	Grosseto, Italy	19 years, 6 days	
Heptathlon	6267 pts	Katarina Johnson-Thompson	4 Aug 2012	30th Olympic Games	London, United Kingdom	19 years, 208 days	
20 km walk	1:43:26	Emma Achurch	2 Oct 2016		Hillingdon, United Kingdom	19 years, 85 days	
4 × 100 m relay	43.78	Great Britain	4 Aug 2022	World Athletics U20 Championships	Cali, Colombia		
4 × 400 m relay	3:30.46	Great Britain	21 Jul 2002		Kingston, Jamaica		

=== Men indoor ===
Event	Record	Athlete	Date	Meet	Place	Country	Age	Ref.
60 m	6.51	Mark Lewis-Francis	11 Mar 2001	8th IAAF World Indoor Championships	Lisbon	Portugal	18 years, 188 days	
200 m	20.78	Tim Benjamin	24 Feb 2001		Birmingham	Great Britain	18 years, 298 days	
400 m	46.16	Edward Faulds	19 Feb 2022	Müller Indoor Grand Prix	Birmingham	Great Britain	19 years, 49 days	
600 m	1:18.29	Karl Johnson	1 Feb 2020	Penn State National Open	State College	United States	18 years, 292 days	
800 m	1:48.53	David Sharpe	8 Feb 1986		Cosford	Great Britain	18 years, 215 days	
1000 m	2:20.36	David Sharpe	8 Mar 1986		Cosford	Great Britain	18 years, 243 days	
1500 m	3:41.44	Thomas Keen	1 Feb 2020	Indoor Track & Field Vienna	Vienna	Austria	18 years, 230 days	
Mile run	4:02.34	Robbie Farnham-Rose	24 Feb 2013	Southeastern Conference Indoor Championships, Randal Tyson Track Complex	Fayetteville	United States	19 years, 50 days	
3000 m	7:54.41	Osian Perrin	22 Jan 2022	Boxx United Manchester World Indoor Tour	Manchester	Great Britain	19 years, 1 day	
5000 m	13:57.38	Joseph O'Brien	23 Feb 2023	ACC Indoor Track & Field Championships	Louisville	United States	18 years, 234 days	
60 m hurdles	7.68	Jon Ridgeon	3 Mar 1985	16th European Athletics Indoor Championships	Piraeus	Greece	18 years, 17 days	
High jump	2.27	Steve Smith	7 Feb 1991		Wuppertal	Germany	17 years, 315 days	
Pole vault	5.55	Adam Hague	31 Jan 2015	Indoor Track & Field Vienna, Dusika Stadion	Vienna	Austria	17 years, 155 days	
Long jump	7.66	Dominic Ogbechie	3 Mar 2019	Welsh Athletics Indoor International, National Indoor Athletics Centre	Cardiff	Great Britain	16 years, 292 days	
Triple jump	16.12	Tosin Oke	27 Feb 1999		Nogent-sur-Oise	France	18 years, 149 days	
Shot put	18.31	Carl Myerscough	8 Feb 1998		Birmingham	Great Britain	18 years, 110 days	
Weight throw	21.43	Ruben Banks	19 Jan 2019	Embry-Riddle Indoor-Outdoor Challenge	Daytona Beach	United States	17 years, 39 days	
Heptathlon	5392	David Hall	25 Jan 2014	International Indoor Match Combined Events, Spain v France v Great Britain	Sheffield	Great Britain	18 years, 275 days	
3000 m walk	11:39.75	Cameron Corbishley	11 Dec 2016	Cardiff Met GP1: Christmas Classic	Cardiff	Great Britain	19 years, 255 days	

=== Women indoor ===
Event	Record	Athlete	Date	Meet	Place	Age	Ref.
60 m	7.19	Bev Kinch	6 Mar 1983	14th European Athletics Indoor Championships	Budapest, Hungary	19 years, 51 days	
200 m	23.15	Dina Asher-Smith	2 Mar 2014	England Athletics U15 / U17 / U20 Championships	Sheffield, United Kingdom	18 years, 88 days	
400 m	53.00	Amber Anning	10 Feb 2019	National Indoor Championships, National Indoor Arena	Birmingham, United Kingdom	18 years, 84 days	
600 m	1:31.66	Hannah Taylor	6 Jan 2023	BMC / Glasgow AA Metric Miler Meeting, Scottish 3000m Championships	Glasgow, United Kingdom	17 years, 97 days	
800 m	1:59.03	Keely Hodgkinson	30 Jan 2021	Indoor Track & Field Vienna	Vienna, Austria	18 years, 333 days	
1000 m	2:49.90	Rebecca Craigie	22 Jan 2011	Hokie Invitational, Rector FH	Blacksburg, United States	19 years, 18 days	
1500 m	4:11.20	Zola Pieterse	26 Jan 1985		Cosford, United Kingdom	18 years, 245 days	
Mile run	4:40.55	Georgie Peel	26 Jan 2013	Razorback Invitational, Randal Tyson Track Complex	Fayetteville, United States	18 years, 245 days	
3000 m	8:56.13	Zola Pieterse	9 Feb 1985		Cosford, United Kingdom	18 years, 259 days	
5000 m	17:07.61	Emily Thompson	10 Feb 2018	BU David Hemery Valentine Invitational	Boston, United States	17 years, 328 days	
60 m hurdles	8.19	Alicia Barrett	26 Feb 2017	England Athletics U15 / U17 / U20 Indoor Championships	Sheffield, United Kingdom	18 years, 338 days	
High jump	1.94 m	Morgan Lake	14 Feb 2015	Sainsbury's Indoor British Championships, EIS	Sheffield, United Kingdom	17 years, 278 days	
Pole vault	4.52 m	Katie Byres	18 Feb 2012	Finale du Perche Elite Tour	Nevers, France	18 years, 160 days	
Long jump	6.39 m	Katarina Johnson-Thompson	4 Feb 2012	McCain City Challenge	Sheffield, United Kingdom	19 years, 26 days	
Triple jump	12.99 m	Naomi Metzger	31 Jan 2016	Elán Miting	Bratislava, Slovakia	17 years, 288 days	
Shot put	16.41 m	Divine Oladipo	25 Feb 2017	The American Championships	Birmingham, United States	18 years, 143 days	
Pentathlon	4527 pts	Morgan Lake	6 Mar 2015	33rd European Athletics Indoor Championships	Prague, Czech Republic	17 years, 298 days	
3000 m walk	13:29.19	Emma Achurch	15 Feb 2015	Sainsbury's Indoor British Championships	Sheffield, United Kingdom	17 years, 221 days	
4 × 400 m relay	3:44.28	Great Britain	4 Mar 2000		Neubrandenburg, Germany		
