= List of Commonwealth records in athletics =

Commonwealth records in athletics are the best marks set in an event by an athlete who competes for a member nation of the Commonwealth of Nations.

== Outdoor ==
Key to tables:

# = not record eligible
est = estimate

=== Men ===
Event	Record	Athlete	Nationality	Date	Meet	Place	Ref.	Video
100 m	9.58 (+0.9 m/s)	Usain Bolt	Jamaica	16 August 2009	World Championships	Berlin, Germany		
200 m	19.19 (−0.3 m/s)	Usain Bolt	Jamaica	20 August 2009	World Championships	Berlin, Germany		
300 m	30.69 A	Letsile Tebogo	Botswana	17 February 2024	Simbine Curro Classic Shoot-Out	Pretoria, South Africa		
400 m	43.03	Wayde van Niekerk	South Africa	14 August 2016	Olympic Games	Rio de Janeiro, Brazil		
800 m	1:40.91	David Rudisha	Kenya	9 August 2012	Olympic Games	London, United Kingdom		
1000 m	2:11.83	Emmanuel Wanyonyi	Kenya	10 July 2026	Herculis	Fontvieille, Monaco		
1500 m	3:26.34	Bernard Lagat	Kenya	24 August 2001	Memorial Van Damme	Brussels, Belgium		
Mile	3:42.66	Josh Kerr	Scotland	18 July 2026	London Athletics Meet	London, United Kingdom		
Mile (road)	3:51.3 h	Elliot Giles	England	1 September 2024	New Balance Kö Meile	Düsseldorf, Germany		
2000 m	4:48.14	Reynold Kipkorir Cheruiyot	Kenya	8 September 2023	Memorial Van Damme	Brussels, Belgium		
3000 m	7:20.67	Daniel Komen	Kenya	1 September 1996	IAAF Grand Prix	Rieti, Italy		
5000 m	12:35.36	Joshua Cheptegei	Uganda	14 August 2020	Herculis	Fontvieille, Monaco		
5 km (road)	12:51	Joshua Cheptegei	Uganda	16 February 2020	5 km Herculis	Monaco		
10,000 m	26:11.00	Joshua Cheptegei	Uganda	7 October 2020		Valencia, Spain		
10 km (road)	26:24	Rhonex Kipruto	Kenya	12 January 2020	10k Valencia Ibercaja	Valencia, Spain		
15 km (road)	41:05	Joshua Cheptegei	Uganda	18 November 2018	Zevenheuvelenloop	Nijmegen, Netherlands		
15 km (road)	41:05+	Geoffrey Kamworor	Kenya	15 September 2019	Copenhagen Half Marathon	Copenhagen, Denmark		
20,000 m (track)	56:20.30+	Mo Farah	Great Britain	4 September 2020	Memorial van Damme	Brussels, Belgium		
20 km (road)	54:43+ (Note: by official result source, 54:42 by World Athletics source)	Kibiwott Kandie	Kenya	6 December 2020	Valencia Half Marathon	Valencia, Spain		
Half marathon	57:31	Jacob Kiplimo	Uganda	21 November 2021	Lisbon Half Marathon	Lisbon, Portugal		
One hour	21330 m	Mo Farah	Great Britain	4 September 2020	Memorial van Damme	Brussels, Belgium		
25,000 m (track)	1:12:25.4+	Moses Mosop	Kenya	3 June 2011	Prefontaine Classic	Eugene, United States		
25 km (road)	1:11:08+	Eliud Kipchoge	Kenya	25 September 2022	Berlin Marathon	Berlin, Germany		
30,000 m (track)	1:26:47.4	Moses Mosop	Kenya	3 June 2011	Prefontaine Classic	Eugene, United States		
30 km (road)	1:25:40+	Eliud Kipchoge	Kenya	25 September 2022	Berlin Marathon	Berlin, Germany		
Marathon	1:59:30	Sabastian Sawe	Kenya	26 April 2026	London Marathon	London, United Kingdom		
50 km (road)	2:40:13	Stephen Mokoka	South Africa	6 March 2022	Nedbank #Runified 50 km	Gqeberha, South Africa		
100 km (track)	6:10:20	Don Ritchie	Great Britain	28 October 1978	100 km Crystal Palace Track Race	London, United Kingdom		
24 hours	303506 m	Yiannis Kouros	Australia	24 October 1997	Sri Chinmoy 24 Hour Race	Kensington, Australia		
110 m hurdles	12.90 (+0.7 m/s)	Omar McLeod	Jamaica	24 June 2017	Jamaican Championships	Kingston, Jamaica		
400 m hurdles	47.08	Kyron McMaster	British Virgin Islands	3 August 2021	Olympic Games	Tokyo, Japan		
3000 m steeplechase	7:53.64	Brimin Kipruto	Kenya	22 July 2011	Herculis	Fontvieille, Monaco		
High jump	2.40 m	Derek Drouin	Canada	25 April 2014	Drake Relays	Des Moines, United States		
Pole vault	6.05 m	Dmitri Markov	Australia	9 August 2001	World Championships	Edmonton, Canada		
Long jump	8.69 m (+0.5 m/s)	Tajay Gayle	Jamaica	28 September 2019	World Championships	Doha, Qatar		
Triple jump	18.29 m (+1.3 m/s)	Jonathan Edwards	Great Britain	7 August 1995	World Championships	Gothenburg, Sweden		
Shot put	22.90 m	Tomas Walsh	New Zealand	5 October 2019	World Championships	Doha, Qatar		
Discus throw	74.78 m	Matthew Denny	Australia	13 April 2025	Oklahoma Throws Series World Invitational	Ramona, United States		
Hammer throw	84.70 m	Ethan Katzberg	Canada	16 September 2025	World Championships	Tokyo, Japan		
Javelin throw	93.07 m	Anderson Peters	Grenada	13 May 2022	Doha Diamond League	Doha, Qatar		
Decathlon	9018 pts	Damian Warner	Canada	4–5 August 2021	Olympic Games	Tokyo, Japan		
Decathlon	100m (wind) / Long jump (wind) / Shot put / High jump / 400m / 110m H (wind) / Discus / Pole vault / Javelin / 1500m; 10.12 (+0.2 m/s) / 8.24 m (+0.2 m/s) / 14.80 m / 2.02 m / 47.48 / 13.46 (−1.0 m/s) / 48.67 m / 4.90 m / 63.44 m / 4:31.08							
3000 m walk (track)	10:43.84	Tom Bosworth	Great Britain	21 July 2018	Diamond League	London, United Kingdom		
5000 m walk (track)	18:38.97	Dane Bird-Smith	Australia	5 March 2016	Melbourne Track Classic	Albert Park, Australia		
10,000 m walk (track)	38:08.50	Evan Dunfee	Canada	27 January 2025	Supernova	Canberra, Australia		
10,000 m walk (track)	38:06.6 h #	David Smith	Australia	25 September 1986		Sydney, Australia		
10 km walk (road)	38:07	David Smith	Australia	25 September 1986		Sydney, Australia		
20,000 m walk (track)	1:19:48.1 h	Nathan Deakes	Australia	4 September 2001		Brisbane, Australia		
20 km walk (road)	1:17.33	Nathan Deakes	Australia	23 April 2005		Cixi City, China		
35 km walk (road)	2:25:02	Evan Dunfee	Canada	24 July 2022	World Championships	Eugene, United States		
50,000 m walk (track)	3:43:50.0	Simon Baker	Australia	9 September 1990		Melbourne, Australia		
50 km walk (road)	3:35.47	Nathan Deakes	Australia	2 December 2006		Geelong, Australia		
4 × 100 m relay	36.84	Nesta Carter; Michael Frater; Yohan Blake; Usain Bolt	Jamaica	11 August 2012	Olympic Games	London, United Kingdom		
4 × 200 m relay	1:18.63	Nickel Ashmeade; Warren Weir; Jermaine Brown; Yohan Blake	Jamaica	24 May 2014	IAAF World Relays	Nassau, Bahamas		
4 × 400 m relay	2:54.53	Bayapo Ndori; Busang Kebinatshipi; Anthony Pesela; Letsile Tebogo	Botswana	10 August 2024	Olympic Games	Paris, France		
4 × 800 m relay	7:02.43	Joseph Mutua; William Yiampoy; Ismael Kombich; Wilfred Bungei	Kenya	25 August 2006	Memorial Van Damme	Brussels, Belgium		
Distance medley relay	9:15.56	Elkanah Angwenyi 2:50.8 (1200m); Thomas Musembi 45.8 (400m); Alfred Kirwa Yego 1:46.2 (800m); Alex Kipchirchir 3:52.8 (1600 m)	Kenya	29 April 2006	Penn Relays	Philadelphia, United States		
4 × 1500 m relay	14:22.22	Collins Cheboi; Silas Kiplagat; James Kiplagat Magut; Asbel Kiprop	Kenya	25 May 2014	IAAF World Relays	Nassau, Bahamas		
Ekiden relay	1:57:06	Josephat Muchiri Ndambiri 13:24/ 5 km Martin Irungu Mathathi 27:12/ 10 km Daniel Muchunu Mwangi 13:59/ 5 km Mekubo Mogusu 27:56/ 10 km Onesmus Nyerre 14:36/ 5 km John Kariuki 19:59/ 7.195 km	Kenya	23 November 2005	International Chiba Ekiden	Chiba, Japan		

==== Commonwealth best times for non-standard events ====
Event	Record	Athlete	Nationality	Date	Meet	Place	Ref.	Video
50 m	5.47+ (+0.9 m/s)	Usain Bolt	Jamaica	16 August 2009	World Championships	Berlin, Germany		
60 m	6.31+ (+0.9 m/s)	Usain Bolt	Jamaica	16 August 2009	World Championships	Berlin, Germany		
100 y	9.07+ (−0.5 m/s)	Asafa Powell	Jamaica	27 May 2010	Golden Spike Ostrava	Ostrava, Czech Republic		
150 m (bend)	14.44+ (−0.3 m/s)	Usain Bolt	Jamaica	20 August 2009	World Championships	Berlin, Germany		
150 m (straight)	14.35 (+1.1 m/s)	Usain Bolt	Jamaica	17 May 2009	Manchester City Games	Manchester, United Kingdom		
200 m straight	19.84 (+0.6 m/s)	Wayde van Niekerk	South Africa	4 June 2017	Boost Boston Games	Boston, United States		
500 m	57.69	David Rudisha	Kenya	10 September 2016	Great North CityGames	Newcastle, United Kingdom		
600 m	1:13.10	David Rudisha	Kenya	5 June 2016	British Grand Prix	Birmingham, United Kingdom		
Two miles	7:58.61	Daniel Komen	Kenya	19 July 1997	KBC Night of Athletics	Hechtel-Eksel, Belgium		
10 miles (road)	44:04	Benard Koech	Kenya	4 December 2022	Kosa 10-Miler	Kōsa, Japan		
2000 m steeplechase	5:14.43	Julius Kariuki	Kenya	21 August 1990		Rovereto, Italy		
200 m hurdles "straight"	22.10 (+2.0 m/s) ^{[WB]}	Andy Turner	Great Britain	15 May 2011	Manchester City Games	Manchester, United Kingdom		
200 m hurdles "straight"	22.10 (+1.8 m/s) ^{[WB]}	L. J. van Zyl	South Africa	9 May 2015	Manchester City Games	Manchester, United Kingdom		
200 m hurdles "curve"	22.59 (+0.2 m/s)	Darryl Wohlsen	Australia	14 March 1996		Brisbane, Australia		
Mile walk (track)	5:31.08 ^{[WB]}	Tom Bosworth	Great Britain	9 July 2017	London Grand Prix	London, United Kingdom		
Swedish relay	1:46.59	Puma Reggae Team; Christopher Williams (100m); Usain Bolt (200m); Davian Clarke (300m); Jermaine Gonzales (400 m)	Jamaica	25 July 2006	DN Galan	Stockholm, Stockholm		
Sprint medley relay (2,2,4,8)	3:19.97	Mario Forsythe (200 m); Jamari Rose (200 m); Allodin Fothergill (400 m); Jo-Wayne Hibbert (800 m)	Jamaica	29 April 2017	Penn Relays	Philadelphia, United States		
4 × mile relay	15:59.57	Tony Rogers; John Bowden; Mike Gilchrist; John Walker	New Zealand	2 March 1983		Auckland, New Zealand		

=== Women ===
Event	Record	Athlete	Nationality	Date	Meet	Place	Ref.
100 m	10.54 (+0.9 m/s)	Elaine Thompson-Herah	Jamaica	21 August 2021	Prefontaine Classic	Eugene, United States	
200 m	21.41 (+0.1 m/s)	Shericka Jackson	Jamaica	25 August 2023	World Championships	Budapest, Hungary	
400 m	48.36	Shaunae Miller-Uibo	Bahamas	6 August 2021	Olympic Games	Tokyo, Japan	
800 m	1:54.01	Pamela Jelimo	Kenya	29 August 2008	Weltklasse Zürich	Zürich, Switzerland	
1000 m	2:29.15	Faith Kipyegon	Kenya	14 August 2020	Herculis	Fontvieille, Monaco	
1500 m	3:48.68	Faith Kipyegon	Kenya	5 July 2025	Prefontaine Classic	Eugene, United States	
Mile	4:07.64	Faith Kipyegon	Kenya	21 July 2023	Herculis	Fontvieille, Monaco	
Mile	4:06.42 # (Note: Not record eligible due to the use of a team of pacemakers and custom gear.)	Faith Kipyegon	Kenya	26 June 2025	Breaking4	Paris, France	
Mile (road)	4:24.13 Wo	Faith Kipyegon	Kenya	1 October 2023	World Road Running Championships	Riga, Latvia	
2000 m	5:19.70	Jessica Hull	Australia	12 July 2024	Herculis	Fontvieille, Monaco	
3000 m	8:07.04	Faith Kipyegon	Kenya	16 August 2025	Kamila Skolimowska Memorial	Chorzów, Poland	
5000 m	13:58.06	Beatrice Chebet	Kenya	5 July 2025	Prefontaine Classic	Eugene, United States	
5 km (road)	14:13 Wo	Beatrice Chebet	Kenya	31 December 2023	Cursa dels Nassos	Barcelona, Spain	
5 km (road)	13:54	Beatrice Chebet	Kenya	31 December 2024	Cursa dels Nassos	Barcelona, Spain	
10,000 m	28:54.14	Beatrice Chebet	Kenya	25 May 2024	Prefontaine Classic	Eugene, United States	
10 km (road)	29:24 Wo	Agnes Ngetich	Kenya	10 September 2023	Brașov Running Festival	Brașov, Romania	
15 km (road)	45:37+	Joyciline Jepkosgei	Kenya	1 April 2017	Prague Half Marathon	Prague, Czech Republic	
One hour	18341 m	Eva Cherono	Kenya	4 September 2020	Memorial van Damme	Brussels, Belgium	
20,000 m (track)	1:05:26.6	Tegla Loroupe	Kenya	3 September 2000		Borgholzhausen, Germany	
20 km (road)	1:01:25+	Joyciline Jepkosgei	Kenya	1 April 2017	Prague Half Marathon	Prague, Czech Republic	
20 km (road)	1:01:20+ a	Brigid Kosgei	Kenya	8 September 2019	Great North Run	Newcastle upon Tyne-South Shields, United Kingdom	
Half marathon	1:04:49 Mx	Brigid Kosgei	Kenya	21 February 2020	Ras Al Khaimah Half Marathon	Ras Al Khaimah, United Arab Emirates	
Half marathon	1:04:28 Mx a	Brigid Kosgei	Kenya	8 September 2019	Great North Run	Newcastle upon Tyne-South Shields, United Kingdom	
Half marathon	1:05:16 Wo	Peres Jepchirchir	Kenya	17 October 2020	World Half Marathon Championships	Gdynia, Poland	
25,000 m (track)	1:27:05.9	Tegla Loroupe	Kenya	21 September 2002		Mengerskirchen, Germany	
25 km (road)	1:19:33+ Mx	Brigid Kosgei	Kenya	13 October 2019	Chicago Marathon	Chicago, United States	
25 km (road)	1:19:43+ Wo	Mary Jepkosgei Keitany	Kenya	23 April 2017	London Marathon	London, United Kingdom	
30,000 m (track)	1:45:50.00	Tegla Loroupe	Kenya	7 June 2003		Warstein, Germany	
30 km (road)	1:35:18+ Mx	Brigid Kosgei	Kenya	13 October 2019	Chicago Marathon	Chicago, United States	
30 km (road)	1:36:05+ Wo	Mary Jepkosgei Keitany	Kenya	23 April 2017	London Marathon	London, United Kingdom	
Marathon	2:14:04 Mx	Brigid Kosgei	Kenya	13 October 2019	Chicago Marathon	Chicago, United States	
Marathon	2:16:16 Wo	Peres Jepchirchir	Kenya	21 April 2024	London Marathon	London, United Kingdom	
50 km (road)	3:04:24 (Note: by IAU source; 3:04:23 by other sources)	Irvette Van Zyl	South Africa	23 May 2021	Nedbank Runified Race	Port Elizabeth, South Africa	
100 km	7:03:40	Sarah Webster	Great Britain	2 April 2023	Anglo Celtic Plate 100k	Craigavon, Northern Ireland	
24 hours (road)	278.621 km (Note: by IAU source; 278.622 by other sources)	Sarah Webster	Great Britain	19 October 2025	IAU 24 Hour World Championship	Albi, France	
100 m hurdles	12.12 (+0.9 m/s)	Tobi Amusan	Nigeria	24 July 2022	World Championships	Eugene, United States	
400 m hurdles	52.42	Melaine Walker	Jamaica	20 August 2009	World Championships	Berlin, Germany	
2000 m steeplechase	5:47.42	Beatrice Chepkoech	Kenya	10 September 2023	Hanžeković Memorial	Zagreb, Croatia	
3000 m steeplechase	8:44.32	Beatrice Chepkoech	Kenya	20 July 2018	Herculis	Fontvieille, Monaco	
High jump	2.06 m	Hestrie Cloete	South Africa	31 August 2003	World Championships	Saint-Denis, France	
Pole vault	4.94 m	Eliza McCartney	New Zealand	17 July 2018		Jockgrim, Germany	
Long jump	7.17 m (+1.1 m/s)	Ese Brume	Nigeria	29 May 2021	Chula Vista Field Festival	Chula Vista, United States	
Triple jump	15.39 m (+0.5 m/s)	Françoise Mbango Etone	Cameroon	17 August 2008	Olympic Games	Beijing, China	
Shot put	21.24 m	Valerie Adams	New Zealand	29 August 2011	World Championships	Daegu, South Korea	
Discus throw	69.64 m	Dani Stevens	Australia	13 August 2017	World Championships	London, United Kingdom	
Hammer throw	80.51 m	Camryn Rogers	Canada	15 September 2025	World Championships	Tokyo, Japan	
Javelin throw	69.35 m	Sunette Viljoen	South Africa	9 June 2012	Adidas Grand Prix	New York City, United States	
Heptathlon	6981 pts	Katarina Johnson-Thompson	Great Britain	2–4 October 2019	World Championships	Doha, Qatar	
Heptathlon	100m H (wind) / High jump / Shot put / 200m (wind) / Long jump (wind) / Javelin / 800m; 13.09 (+0.6 m/s) / 1.95 m / 13.86 m / 23.08 (+1.0 m/s) / 6.77 m (+0.2 m/s) / 43.93 m / 2:07.26						
Decathlon	6915 pts h	Margaret Simpson	Ghana	18–19 April 2007		Réduit, Mauritius	
Decathlon	100m (wind) / Long jump (wind) / Shot put / High jump / 400m / 100m H (wind) / Discus / Pole vault / Javelin / 1500m						
Decathlon	6878 pts	Jessica Taylor	Great Britain	12–13 September 2015	Kent County Multi-Events Championships	Erith, United Kingdom	
Decathlon	100m (wind) / Long jump (wind) / Shot put / High jump / 400m / 100m H (wind) / Discus / Pole vault / Javelin / 1500m; 12.30 (−2.7) / 5.96 m (+0.2) / 11.48 m / 1.63 m / 55.12 / 14.61 (−1.5) / 28.77 m / 2.50 m / 34.76 m / 5:44.32						
3000 m walk (track)	12:14.48	Kerry Saxby	Australia	20 February 1988		Sydney, Australia	
5000 m walk (track)	20:03.00	Kerry Saxby-Junna	Australia	11 February 1996	Optus Grand Prix	Sydney, Australia	
5 km walk (road)	20:25	Kerry Saxby	Australia	10 June 1989	Internationaler Geher-Cup	Hildesheim, West Germany	
10,000 m walk (track)	41:57.22	Kerry Saxby	Australia	24 July 1990		Seattle, United States	
10 km walk (road)	41:29.71	Kerry Saxby-Junna	Australia	27 August 1988		Canberra, Australia	
20,000 m walk (track)	1:33:40.2	Kerry Saxby-Junna	Australia	6 September 2001		Brisbane, Australia	
20 km walk (road)	1:27:44	Jane Saville	Australia	2 May 2004		Naumburg, Germany	
50 km walk (road)	4:09:33	Claire Tallent	Australia	5 May 2018	IAAF World Race Walking Team Championships	Taicang, China	
4 × 100 m relay	41.02	Briana Williams; Elaine Thompson-Herah; Shelly-Ann Fraser-Pryce; Shericka Jackson	Jamaica	6 August 2021	Olympic Games	Tokyo, Japan	
4 × 200 m relay	1:29.04	Jura Levy; Shericka Jackson; Sashalee Forbes; Elaine Thompson	Jamaica	22 April 2017	IAAF World Relays	Nassau, Bahamas	
Swedish relay	2:03.42	Christania Williams (100 m); Shericka Jackson (200 m); Olivia James (300 m); Chrisann Gordon (400 m)	Jamaica	10 July 2011		Lille, France	
4 × 400 m relay	3:18.71	Rosemarie Whyte; Davita Prendergast; Novlene Williams-Mills; Shericka Williams	Jamaica	3 September 2011	World Championships	Daegu, South Korea	
4 × 800 m relay	8:04.28	Agatha Jeruto; Sylivia Chematui Chesebe; Janeth Jepkosgei; Eunice Jepkoech Sum	Kenya	25 May 2014	IAAF World Relays	Nassau, Bahamas	
Distance medley relay	10:43.35	Selah Jepleting Busienei (1200 m); Joy Nakhumicha Sakari (400 m); Sylivia Chematui Chesebe (800 m); Virginia Nyambura Nganga (1600 m)	Kenya	2 May 2015	IAAF World Relays	Nassau, Bahamas	
4 × 1500 m relay	16:33.58	Mercy Cherono; Faith Kipyegon; Irene Jelagat; Hellen Obiri	Kenya	24 May 2014	2014 IAAF World Relays	Nassau, Bahamas	
Ekiden relay	2:13:35	Philes Ongori; Evelyne Kemunto Kimwei; Sally Kaptich Chepyego; Catherine Ndereba; Jane Wanjiku Gakunyi; Lucy Wangui Kabuu	Kenya	23 November 2006	International Chiba Ekiden	Chiba, Japan	

==== Commonwealth best times for non-standard events ====
Event	Record	Athlete	Nationality	Date	Meet	Place	Ref.	Video
100 y	9.91+ (+1.1 m/s) ^{[WB]}	Veronica Campbell-Brown	Jamaica	31 May 2011	Golden Spike Ostrava	Ostrava, Czech Republic		
150 m (bend)	16.46 (−1.5 m/s)	Merlene Ottey	Jamaica	27 September 1989		Trapani, Italy		
150 m (straight)	15.85 (+2.0 m/s)	Favour Ofili	Nigeria	17 May 2025	Adidas Games	Atlanta, United States		
200 m straight	21.76 (+0.5 m/s)	Shaunae Miller-Uibo	Bahamas	4 June 2017	Adidas Boost Boston Games	Somerville, United States		
300 m	34.41	Shaunae Miller-Uibo	Bahamas	20 June 2019	Golden Spike Ostrava	Ostrava, Czech Republic		
500 m	1:06.62	Lynsey Sharp	Great Britain	10 September 2016	Great North CityGames	Newcastle, United Kingdom		
600 m	1:21.63	Mary Moraa	Kenya	1 September 2024	ISTAF Berlin	Berlin, Germany		
Two miles	9:11.49	Mercy Cherono	Kenya	24 August 2014	British Athletics Grand Prix	Birmingham, United Kingdom		
10 miles (road)	49:49+ Mx	Ruth Chepng'etich	Kenya	9 October 2022	Chicago Marathon	Chicago, United States		
10 miles (road)	49:21+ a	Brigid Kosgei	Kenya	8 September 2019	Great North Run	Newcastle upon Tyne-South Shields, United Kingdom		
50 Miles (track)	6:07:58	Linda Meadows	Australia	18 June 1994	50 Mile Track Race Burwood	Burwood, Australia		
100 Miles (track)	14:34:05	Samantha Amend	Great Britain	24 April 2021	Centurion Running Track 100 Mile	Ashford, United Kingdom		
200 m hurdles (straight)	24.86 (+0.1 m/s)	Shiann Salmon	Jamaica	23 May 2021	Adidas Boost Boston Games	Boston, United States		
200 m hurdles (bend)	25.7 h	Pam Kilborn-Ryan	Australia	25 November 1971		Melbourne, Australia		
200 m hurdles (bend)	25.79 (−0.6 m/s)	Lauren Wells	Australia	21 January 2017	Athletics ACT Combined Events Championships	Canberra, Australia		
300 m hurdles	38.75	Lina Nielsen	Great Britain	26 May 2023	Aufbaumeeting Krumme Strecken	St. Pölten, Austria		
Sprint medley relay (1,1,2,4)	1:36.67	Audra Segree (100 m); Natasha Morrison (100 m); Anastasia Le-Roy (200 m); Verone Chambers (400 m)	Jamaica	29 April 2017	Penn Relays	Philadelphia, Pennsylvania		
Sprint medley relay (2,2,4,8)	3:34.56	Sherri-Ann Brooks (200 m); Rosemarie Whyte(200 m); Moya Thompson 51.7 (400 m); Kenia Sinclair 1:57.43 (800 m)	Jamaica	April 2009	Penn Relays	Philadelphia, United States		

=== Mixed ===
Event	Record	Athlete	Nationality	Date	Meet	Place	Ref.
4 × 100 m relay	39.62	Ackeem Blake; Tina Clayton; Kadrian Goldson; Tia Clayton	Jamaica	3 May 2026	World Relays	Gaborone, Botswana	
4 × 400 m relay	3:11.78	Nathon Allen; Roneisha McGregor; Tiffany James; Javon Francis	Jamaica	29 September 2019	World Championships	Doha, Qatar	

== Indoor ==
=== Men ===
Event	Record	Athlete	Nationality	Date	Meet	Place	Ref.	Video
50 m	5.56 A	Donovan Bailey	Canada	9 February 1996	Bill Cosby Invitational	Reno, United States		
55 m	5.99	Obadele Thompson	Barbados	22 February 1997	Western Athletic Conference Championships	Colorado Springs, United States		
60 m	6.42	Dwain Chambers	Great Britain	7 March 2009	European Indoor Championships	Turin, Italy		
150 m	14.99	Donovan Bailey	Canada	1 June 1997	Bailey–Johnson 150-metre race	Toronto, Ontario, Canada		
200 m	19.92	Frankie Fredericks	Namibia	18 February 1996	Meeting Pas de Calais	Liévin, France		
300 m	31.97	Bralon Taplin	Grenada	14 February 2017	Czech Indoor Gala	Ostrava, Czech Republic		
400 m	44.49 (Note: Starting blocks did not comply with World Athletics regulations, athlete passed drug test on the day)	Christopher Morales Williams	Canada	24 February 2024	SEC Championships	Fayetteville, United States		
500 m	1:00.71	Onkabetse Nkobolo	Botswana	17 February 2016	Globen Galan	Stockholm, Sweden		
600 y	1:06.68 OT	Jonathan Jones	Barbados	26 February 2022	Big 12 Championships	Ames, United States		
600 m	1:14.79 A	Michael Saruni	Kenya	19 January 2018	Dr. Martin Luther King Collegiate Invitational	Albuquerque, United States		
800 m	1:43.98	Michael Saruni	Kenya	9 February 2019	Millrose Games	New York City, United States		
1000 m	2:14.74	Marco Arop	Canada	4 February 2024	New Balance Indoor Grand Prix	Boston, United States		
1500 m	3:32.11	Laban Rotich	Kenya	1 February 1998	Sparkassen Cup	Stuttgart, Germany		
Mile	3:48.87	Josh Kerr	Great Britain	27 February 2022	Boston University Last Chance Meet	Boston, United States		
2000 m	4:55.35	Cameron Levins	Canada	15 February 2014	Millrose Games	New York City, United States		
3000 m	7:24.90	Daniel Komen	Kenya	6 February 1998		Budapest, Hungary		
Two miles	8:00.67	Josh Kerr	Great Britain	11 February 2024	Millrose Games	New York City, United States		
5000 m	12:51.48	Daniel Komen	Kenya	19 February 1998	GE Galan	Stockholm, Sweden		
50 m hurdles	6.25	Mark McKoy	Canada	5 March 1986		Kobe, Japan		
55 m hurdles	7.03	Mark McKoy	Canada	27 February 1987	US Indoor Championships	New York City, United States		
60 m hurdles	7.30	Colin Jackson	Great Britain	6 March 1994		Sindelfingen, Germany		
300 m hurdles	34.92 OT	Llewellyn Herbert	South Africa	9 February 1999	Pirkkahall	Tampere, Finland		
400 m hurdles	50.21	Richard Yates	Great Britain	19 February 2011	Aviva Indoor Grand Prix	Birmingham, United Kingdom		
2000 m steeplechase	5:13.77	Paul Kipsiele Koech	Kenya	13 February 2011	Indoor Flanders Meeting	Ghent, Belgium		
High jump	2.38 m	Steve Smith	Great Britain	4 February 1994		Wuppertal, Germany		
Pole vault	6.06 m	Steven Hooker	Australia	7 February 2009	Boston Indoor Games	Roxbury, United States		
Long jump	8.44 m	Luvo Manyonga	South Africa	2 March 2018	World Championships	Birmingham, United Kingdom		
Triple jump	17.75 m	Phillips Idowu	Great Britain	9 March 2008	World Indoor Championships	Valencia, Spain		
Shot put	22.31 m	Tomas Walsh	New Zealand	3 March 2018	World Championships	Birmingham, United Kingdom		
Weight throw	24.72 m	Scott Russell	Canada	8 February 2002		Ames, United States		
Discus throw	65.60 m	Benn Harradine	Australia	12 March 2011	4th World Indoor Throwing	Växjö, Sweden		
Javelin throw	76.66 m	Stuart Faben	Great Britain	3 March 1996		Kajaani, Finland		
Heptathlon	6343 pts	Damian Warner	Canada	2–3 March 2018	World Championships	Birmingham, United Kingdom		
Heptathlon	60m / Long jump / Shot put / High jump / 60m H / Pole vault / 1000m; 6.74 / 7.39 m / 14.90 m / 2.02 m / 7.67 / 4.90 m / 2:37.12							
3000 m walk	10:30.28	Tom Bosworth	Great Britain	25 February 2018	Glasgow Grand Prix	Glasgow, United Kingdom		
5000 m walk	18:20.97	Tom Bosworth	Great Britain	23 February 2020	British Championships	Glasgow, United Kingdom		
4 × 200 m relay	1:22.11	Linford Christie; Darren Braithwaite; Ade Mafe; John Regis	Great Britain	3 March 1991		Glasgow, United Kingdom		
4 × 400 m relay	3:02.52	Deon Lendore; Jereem Richards; Asa Guevara; Lalonde Gordon	Trinidad and Tobago	4 March 2018	World Championships	Birmingham, United Kingdom		
4 × 800 m relay	7:23.13	Kyle Smith; Andrew Maloney; Matt Lincoln; Andrew Heaney	Canada	31 January 2009		University Park, United States		

=== Women ===
Event	Record	Athlete	Nationality	Date	Meet	Place	Ref.
50 m	6.00	Merlene Ottey	Jamaica	4 February 1994		Moscow, Russia	
55 m	6.58	Beatrice Utondu	Nigeria	11 February 1990		Monroe, United States	
60 m	6.94 A	Julien Alfred	Saint Lucia	11 March 2023	NCAA Division I Championships	Albuquerque, United States	
200 m	21.87	Merlene Ottey	Jamaica	13 February 1993	Meeting Pas de Calais	Liévin, France	
300 m	35.45	Shaunae Miller-Uibo	Bahamas	3 February 2018	Millrose Games	New York City, United States	
400 m	50.02	Nicola Sanders	Great Britain	3 March 2007	European Championships	Birmingham, United Kingdom	
500 m	1:08.34	Leah Anderson	Jamaica	4 February 2023	New Balance Indoor Grand Prix	Boston, United States	
600 m	1:23.41	Keely Hodgkinson	Great Britain	28 January 2023	Manchester World Indoor Tour	Manchester, United Kingdom	
800 m	1:56.33	Keely Hodgkinson	Great Britain	14 February 2026	British Championships	Birmingham, United Kingdom	
1000 m	2:30.94	Maria Mutola	Mozambique	25 February 1999	GE Galan	Stockholm, Sweden	
1500 m	3:58.53	Georgia Hunter Bell	Great Britain	22 March 2026	World Championships	Toruń, Poland	
Mile	4:17.88	Jemma Reekie	Great Britain	8 February 2020	Millrose Games	New York City, United States	
2000 m	5:26.68	Jessica Hull	Australia	19 February 2026	Meeting Hauts-de-France Pas-de-Calais	Liévin, France	
3000 m	8:22.68	Beatrice Chepkoech	Kenya	2 March 2024	World Championships	Glasgow, United Kingdom	
Two miles	9:04.84	Laura Muir	Great Britain	11 February 2024	Millrose Games	New York City, United States	
5000 m	14:39.89	Kim Smith	New Zealand	27 February 2009		New York City, United States	
50 m hurdles	6.67+	Michelle Freeman	Jamaica	13 February 2000	Meeting Pas de Calais	Liévin, France	
55 m hurdles	7.26+	Ackera Nugent	Jamaica	8 February 2025	Millrose Games	New York City, United States	
60 m hurdles	7.65	Devynne Charlton	Bahamas	3 March 2024	World Championships	Glasgow, United Kingdom	
60 m hurdles	7.65	Devynne Charlton	Bahamas	22 March 2026	World Championships	Toruń, Poland	
400 m hurdles	1:01.04	Carole Kaboud Mebam	Cameroon	12 February 2012	Meeting National	Val-de-Reuil, France	
High jump	1.99 m	Debbie Brill	Canada	23 January 1982		Edmonton, Canada	
Pole vault	4.87 m	Holly Bleasdale	Great Britain	21 January 2012		Villeurbanne, France	
Long jump	7.00 m	Jazmin Sawyers	Great Britain	5 March 2023	European Championships	Istanbul, Turkey	
Triple jump	15.16 m	Ashia Hansen	Great Britain	28 February 1998	European Championships	Valencia, Spain	
Shot put	20.98 m	Valerie Adams	New Zealand	28 August 2013	Weltklasse Zürich	Zürich, Switzerland	
Weight throw	21.27 m	Precious Ogunleye	Nigeria	6 February 2016	Armory Track Invitational	New York City, United States	
Pentathlon	5000 pts	Katarina Johnson-Thompson	Great Britain	6 March 2015	European Championships	Prague, Czech Republic	
Pentathlon	60m H / High jump / Shot put / Long jump / 800m; 8.18 / 1.95 m / 12.32 m / 6.89 m / 2:12.78						
Mile walk	6:17:29	Rachel Seaman	Canada	15 February 2014	Millrose Games	New York City, United States	
3000 m walk	11:53.82	Kerry Saxby-Junna	Australia	13 March 1993	World Championships	Toronto, Canada	
5000 m walk	21:25.37	Bethan Davies	Great Britain	18 February 2018	British Championships	Birmingham, United Kingdom	
4 × 200 m relay	1:33.96	Paula Dunn; Jennifer Stoute; Linda Keough; Sally Gunnell	Great Britain	23 February 1990	Aviva International Match	Glasgow, United Kingdom	
4 × 400 m relay	3:24.89	Lina Nielsen; Hannah Kelly; Emily Newnham; Amber Anning	Great Britain	9 March 2025	European Championships	Apeldoorn, Netherlands	
4 × 800 m relay	8:17.75	Fellan Ferguson; Simoya Campbell; Kimarra McDonald; Natoya Goule	Jamaica	3 February 2018	Millrose Games	New York City, United States	
