= 2016 British Indoor Athletics Championships =

- Dates: 27–28 February
- Host city: Sheffield
- Venue: EIS Sheffield
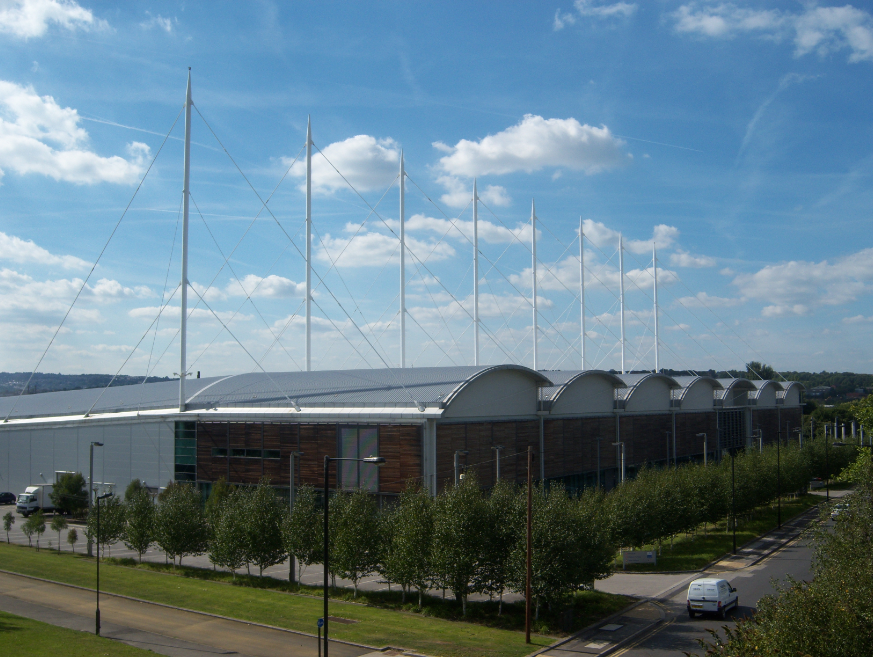
- Level: Senior national
- Type: Indoor
- Events: 26

The 2016 British Indoor Athletics Championships was an indoor track and field competition held from 27–28 February 2016 at the English Institute of Sport, Sheffield, England. A full range of indoor events were held. It served as qualification for the British team at the 2016 IAAF World Indoor Championships.

Championship records were set in both the men's and women's 3000 metres race walk, with Tom Bosworth setting the men's time of 10:58.21 minutes and Bethan Davies claiming the women's mark in 12:44.99 minutes.

== Medal summary ==
=== Men ===
Event	Gold		Silver		Bronze	
60 metres	James Dasaolu	6.53	Andrew Robertson	6.54	Sean Safo-Antwi	6.57
200 metres	Toby Harries	21.13	Ben Snaith	21.22	David Lima (POR)	21.35
400 metres	Nigel Levine	48.00	Cameron Chalmers	48.05	Alex Boyce	48.07
800 metres	Jamie Webb	1:51.25	Spencer Thomas	1:51.35	Guy Learmonth	1:51.45
1500 metres	Charlie Grice	3:46.50	James Brewer	3:46.70	Lewis Moses	3:48.51
3000 metres	Lee Emanuel	7:55.61	Tom Farrell	7:57.39	Sam Stabler	7:59.14
60 metres hurdles	Andrew Pozzi	7.61	Lawrence Clarke	7.65	David Omoregie	7.71
3000 metres walk	Tom Bosworth	10:58.21 CR	Christopher Snook	13:12.24	Tom Partington	13:17.58
High jump	Chris Baker	2.29	Robbie Grabarz	2.26	Mike Edwards	2.22
Pole vault	Luke Cutts	5.60	Andrew Sutcliffe	5.45	Max Eaves	5.45
Long jump	Dan Bramble	7.94	Daniel Gardiner	7.67	Chris Tomlinson	7.52
Triple jump	Tosin Oke (NGR)	16.48	Nathan Fox	16.21	Nathan Douglas	15.93
Shot put	Scott Lincoln	18.90	Scott Rider	17.61	Joey Watson	17.29

=== Women ===
Event	Gold		Silver		Bronze	
60 metres	Asha Philip	7.10	Dina Asher-Smith	7.15	Louise Bloor	7.36
200 metres	Louise Bloor	23.39	Kimbely Baptiste	24.08	Rebecca Campsall	24.25
400 metres	Meghan Beesley	53.15	Montene Speight	53.48	Philippa Lowe	53.61
800 metres	Adelle Tracey	2:02.99	Leah Barrow	2:03.18	Lynsey Sharp	2:03.50
1500 metres	Hannah England	4:15.44	Alison Leonard	4:16.00	Madeleine Murray	4:16.49
3000 metres	Stephanie Twell	8:54.99	Josephine Moultrie	8:58.75	Elinor Kirk	9:05.69
60 metres hurdles	Tiffany Porter	7.98	Serita Solomon	8.05	Lucy Hatton	8.15
3000 metres walk	Bethan Davies	12:44.99 CR	Emma Achurch	13:44.23	Sophie Lewis Ward	14:18.66
High jump	Morgan Lake	1.90	Isobel Pooley	1.90	Niamh Emerson Abby Ward	1.83
Pole vault	Sally Peake	4.20	Jade Ive	4.10	Anna Gordon	4.00
Long jump	Jazmin Sawyers	6.67	Lorraine Ugen	6.60	Sarah Warnock	5.96
Triple jump	Sineade Gutzmore	13.35	Angela Barrett	13.03	Allison Wilder	12.77
Shot put	Rachel Wallader	17.23	Sophie McKinna	16.54	Adele Nicoll	15.91
