= 2018 British Indoor Athletics Championships =

- Dates: 17–18 February
- Host city: Birmingham, United Kingdom
- Venue: Arena Birmingham
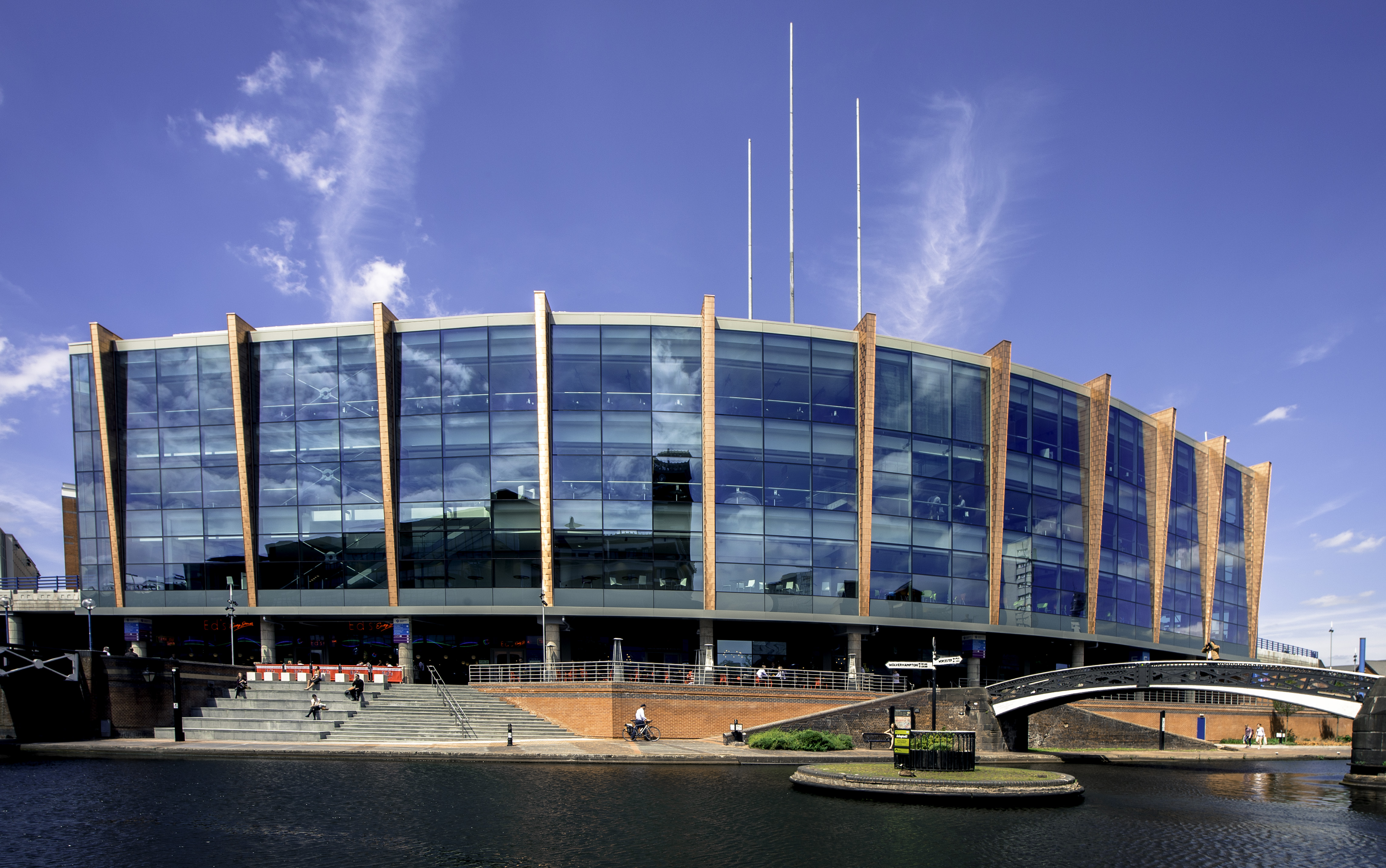
- Level: Senior
- Type: Indoor

The 2018 British Indoor Athletics Championships was held on 17 and 18 February 2018 at the Arena Birmingham in Birmingham, England. The event served as the team trials for the 2018 IAAF World Indoor Championships.

== Medal summary ==
=== Men ===
Event	Gold		Silver		Bronze	
60 metres	Chijindu Ujah	6.56	Andrew Robertson	6.62	Sam Gordon	6.67
200 metres	Antonio Infantino	20.77	Edmond Amaning	21.04	Andrew Morgan-Harrison	21.05
400 metres	Lee Thompson	46.23	Sadam Koumi (SUD)	46.44	Jamal Rhoden-Stevens	47.14
800 metres	Elliot Giles	1:49.91	Jamie Webb	1:50.41	Andrew Osagie	1:50.46
1500 metres	Jake Wightman	3:43.83	Charlie Grice	3:44.57	Tom Marshall	3:47.52
3000 metres	Andrew Heyes	7:54.81	Philip Sesemann	7:55.71	Lewis Moses	7:56.00
5000 metres race walk	Tom Bosworth	18:28.70	Cameron Corbishley	20:57.26	Christopher Snook	22:42.76
60 metres hurdles	Andrew Pozzi	7.58	David King	7.63	Khai Riley-LaBorde	7.78
High jump	Mike Edwards	2.20 m	Chris Baker	2.20 m	Chris Kandu	2.20 m
Pole vault	Adam Hague	5.65 m CR	Harry Coppell Charlie Myers	5.35 m	Not awarded	
Long jump	Greg Rutherford	7.80 m	Adam McMullen	7.75 m	James Lelliott	7.65 m
Triple jump	Nathan Douglas	16.77 m	Julian Reid	16.54 m	Lawrence Davis	15.68 m
Shot put	Scott Lincoln	18.40 m	Scott Rider	17.64 m	Youcef Zatat	17.30 m

=== Women ===
Event	Gold		Silver		Bronze	
60 metres	Asha Philip	7.12	Daryll Neita	7.26	Bianca Williams	7.28
200 metres	Finette Agyapong	23.30	Meghan Beesley	23.57	Amber Anning	23.94
400 metres	Eilidh Doyle	51.84	Zoey Clark	52.12	Amy Allcock	52.74
800 metres	Shelayna Oskan-Clarke	2:00.06	Mhairi Hendry	2:01.30	Adelle Tracey	2:04.61
1500 metres	Eilish McColgan	4:13.94	Katie Snowden	4:15.68	Stacey Smith	4:16.00
3000 metres	Laura Muir	8:46.71	Eilish McColgan	8:50.87	Rosie Clarke	8:52.49
5000 metres race walk	Bethan Davies	21:25.37	Gemma Bridge	22:48.20	Erika Kelly	23:23.69
60 metres hurdles	Megan Marrs	8.16	Yasmin Miller	8.20	Marilyn Nwawulor	8.23
High jump	Morgan Lake	1.88	Bethan Partridge	1.80	Emily Borthwick	1.80 m
Pole vault	Molly Caudery	4.25 m	Jade Ive	4.25 m	Sally Peake	4.15 m
Long jump	Katarina Johnson-Thompson	6.71 m	Jazmin Sawyers	6.08 m	Lucy Hadaway	6.06 m
Triple jump	Kimberly Williams (JAM)	14.16 m	Naomi Ogbeta	13.65 m	Sineade Gutzmore	13.29 m
Shot put	Rachel Wallader	17.45 m	Sophie McKinna	17.42 m	Amelia Strickler	16.67 m
