= Megan Marrs =

British hurdler (born 1997)

Personal information
- Born: 25 September 1997 (age 28)

Sport
- Sport: Athletics
- Events: 60 metres hurdles; 100 metres hurdles
Medal record
British Athletics Championships
Silver medal – second place	2018 Birmingham	100 m hurdles
British Indoor Athletics Championships
Gold medal – first place	2018 Birmingham	60 m hurdles
Gold medal – first place	2022 Birmingham	60 m hurdles

Megan Marrs (born 25 September 1997) is a British track and field athlete who competes in hurdling. She is a two-time gold medalist at the British Indoor Athletics Championships.

She competed in the women's 60 metres hurdles event at the 2018 IAAF World Indoor Championships held in Birmingham, United Kingdom. She also competed in the women's 60 metres hurdles event at the 2022 World Athletics Indoor Championships held in Belgrade, Serbia.

== International competitions ==
Year	Competition	Venue	Position	Event	Notes
Representing Great Britain
2018	World Indoor Championships	Birmingham, United Kingdom	29th (h)	60 m hurdles	8.28
2022	World Indoor Championships	Belgrade, Serbia	27th (h)	60 m hurdles	8.19
