= 2008 British Indoor Athletics Championships =

- Dates: 9–10 February
- Host city: Sheffield
- Venue: EIS Sheffield
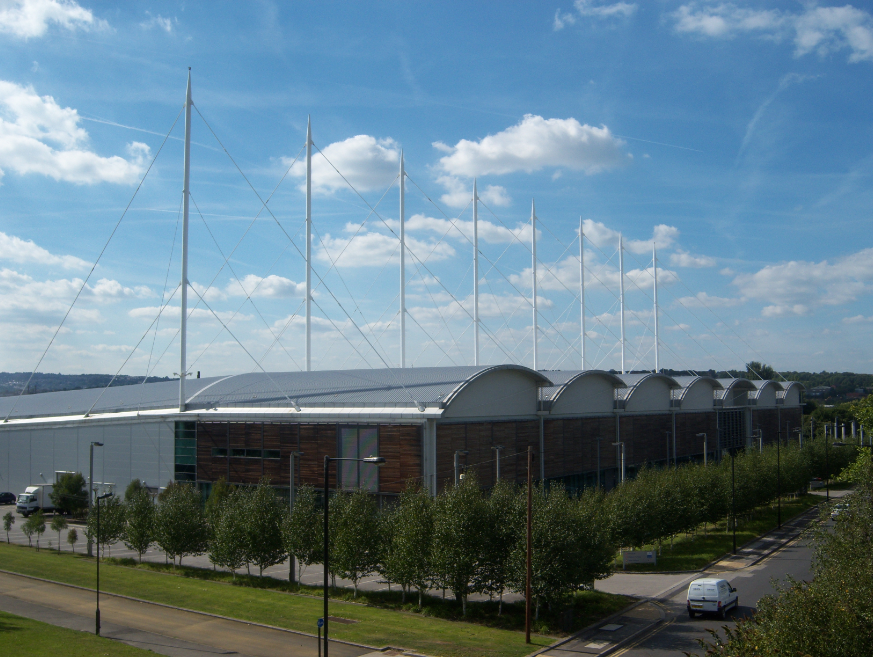
- Level: Senior national
- Type: Indoor
- Events: 24

The 2008 British Indoor Athletics Championships was the 2nd edition of the national championship in indoor track and field for the United Kingdom. It was held from 9–10 February at the English Institute of Sport, Sheffield, England. A total of 24 events (divided evenly between the sexes) were contested over the two-day competition.

== Medal summary ==
=== Men ===
Event	Gold		Silver		Bronze	
60 metres	Dwain Chambers	6.56	Simeon Williamson	6.61	Rikki Fifton	6.65
200 metres	Chris Clarke	20.98	Jeffrey Lawal-Balogun	21.53	Seyi Smith	DQ
400 metres	Richard Buck	46.53	Steven Green	46.93	Richard Strachan	47.99
800 metres	Richard Hill	1:48.26	Damien Moss	1:48.64	Sam Ellis	1:48.87
1500 metres	James McIlroy	3:44.90	Mike East	3:45.05	James Brewer	3:45.27
3000 metres	Nick McCormick	8:16.73	Adam Bowden	8:19.97	Chris Warburton	8:20.40
60 metres hurdles	Allan Scott	7.61	David Hughes	7.71	Richard Alleyne	7.71
High jump	Samson Oni	2.30 m	Tom Parsons	2.19 m	Martin Lloyd	2.19 m
Pole vault	Steven Lewis	5.61 m	Scott Simpson	5.31 m	Mark Christie	5.16 m
Long jump	Chris Tomlinson	7.80 m	Jonathan Moore	7.71 m	JJ Jegede	7.63 m
Triple jump	Phillips Idowu	17.24 m	Nathan Douglas	16.72 m	Tosin Oke	16.26 m
Shot put	Garrett Johnson; United States	20.66 m	Emeka Udechuku	18.06 m	Scott Rider	18.03 m

=== Women ===
Event	Gold		Silver		Bronze	
60 metres	Laura Turner-Alleyne	7.32	Anyika Onuora	7.33	Ailis McSweeney; Ireland	7.40
200 metres	Joice Maduaka	23.43	Kadi-Ann Thomas	23.73	Ellena Ruddock	24.19
400 metres	Meghan Beesley	54.88	Laura Langowski	55.46	Sian Scott	55.74
800 metres	Jenny Meadows	2:01.97	Marilyn Okoro	2:02.56	Claire Nichols	2:08.20
1500 metres	Jemma Simpson	4:13.99	Susan Scott	4:14.84	Katrina Wootton	4:16.00
3000 metres	Helen Clitheroe	8:56.13	Lisa Dobriskey	8:56.49	Tina Brown	9:03.92
60 metres hurdles	Sarah Claxton	8.09	Sara McGreavy-Wills	8.18	Jessica Ennis-Hill	8.20
High jump	Jessica Ennis-Hill	1.92 m	Stephanie Pywell	1.85 m	Kelly Sotherton	1.79 m
Pole vault	Kate Dennison	4.25 m	Louise Butterworth	4.15 m	Zoe Brown; Ireland	4.15 m
Long jump	Kelly Sotherton	6.41 m	Kelly Proper; Ireland	6.31 m	Gillian Cooke	6.22 m
Triple jump	Nadia Williams	13.39 m	Stephanie Aneto	13.01 m	Nony Mordi	12.95 m
Shot put	Eden Francis	16.11 m	Rebecca Peake	15.67 m	Joanne Duncan	15.56 m
