= Great CityGames Manchester =

The Great CityGames was a major street athletics event held annually in Manchester. It was held in conjunction to the Great Manchester Run. The first event was in May 2009, the last event in May 2018.

The event was originally designed to promote the Great Run, however, the Games soon became a major British athletics event, attracting athletes such as Usain Bolt, David Rudisha and Kim Collins.

== Events ==
=== Men's ===
Event	09	10	11	12	13	14	15	16	17	18
60m	•									
100m		•		•	•	•	•	•	•	•
150m	•	•	•	•	•	•	•	•	•	•
500m								•		
Mile	•		•	•	•			•		
2 miles		•	•							
110m hurdles		•	•	•	•	•	•	•	•	•
200m hurdles						•	•		•	•
Shot put	•									
Long jump	•	•	•	•	•	•	•	•	•	
Pole vault	•	•			•					•
Total	6	6	5	5	6	5	5	6	5	5

=== Women's ===
Event	09	10	11	12	13	14	15	16	17	18
100m										
150m	•	•	•	•	•	•	•	•	•	•
500m										
Mile										
2 miles										
100m hurdles	•	•	•	•	•	•	•	•	•	•
200m hurdles										
Pole vault										
Long jump										•
Total										3

=== Mixed ===
Event	09	10	11	12	13	14	15	16	17	18
2×200m relay							•			
Total							1			
