= 2011 British Indoor Athletics Championships =

- Dates: 12–13 February
- Host city: Sheffield
- Venue: EIS Sheffield
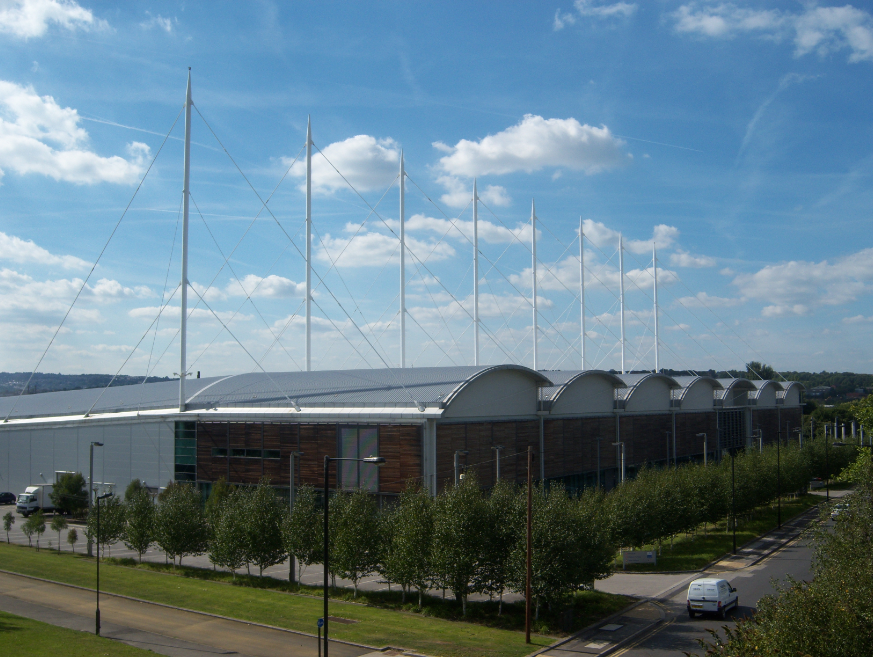
- Level: Senior national
- Type: Indoor
- Events: 24

The 2011 British Indoor Athletics Championships was the 5th edition of the national championship in indoor track and field for the United Kingdom. It was held from 12–13 February 2011 at the English Institute of Sport, Sheffield, England. A total of 24 events (divided evenly between the sexes) were contested over the two-day competition.

Guest athlete Livia Burri set a Swiss indoor record of 9:24.40 while finishing fifth in the women's 3000 m.

== Results ==
=== Men ===
Event	Gold		Silver		Bronze	
60 metres	Dwain Chambers	6.57	Harry Aikines-Aryeetey	6.64	Craig Pickering	6.67
200 metres	Daniel Talbot	20.89 PB	Andy Turner	20.94	Richard Strachan	21.27
400 metres	Nigel Levine	46.76 PB	Richard Buck	47.30	Nick Leavey	47.72
800 metres	Joe Thomas	1:47.87	Andrew Osagie	1:47.96	Guy Learmonth	1:49.34 PB
1500 metres	Nick McCormick	3:45.30 PB	Lewis Moses	3:45.57 PB	Colin McCourt	3:45.63
3000 metres	Andrew Baddeley	7:54.60	Ross Murray	7:59.19 PB	Jonathan Mellor	8:00.49 PB
60 m hurdles	Andy Turner	7.61	Gianni Frankis	7.75 PB=	Lawrence Clarke	7.77
High jump	Tom Parsons	2.31 m	Robbie Grabarz	2.25 m PB	Matthew Roberts	2.18 m
Pole vault	Max Eaves	5.61 m PB	Luke Cutts	5.51 m	Steven Lewis	5.51 m
Long jump	Ezekiel Ewulo	7.60 m PB	JJ Jegede	7.52 m	Dan Bramble	7.46 m PB
Triple jump	Ben Williams	15.88 m	Ade Babatunde	15.60 m PB	Michael Puplampu	15.34 m
Shot put	Scott Rider	17.96 m	Jamie Williamson	17.58 m	Carl Fletcher	17.00 m PB

=== Women ===
Event	Gold		Silver		Bronze	
60 metres	Jodie Williams	7.24 PB	Bernice Wilson	7.25 PB	Jeanette Kwakye	7.33
200 metres	Joice Maduaka	23.64	Katherine Endacott	23.74	Joey Duck	23.93
400 metres	Kelly Sotherton	53.46	Kelly Massey	53.58 PB	Laura Wake	53.97 PB
800 metres	Marilyn Okoro	2:04.36	Dani Christmas	2:06.04	Ciara Everard (IRL)	2:07.98
1500 metres	Stacey Smith	4:22.96 PB	Orla Drumm (IRL)	4:25.12	Sara Louise Treacy (IRL)	4:25.31 PB
3000 metres	Helen Clitheroe	8:55.26	Gemma Turtle	8:57.24 PB	Laura Kenney	9:08.32
60 m hurdles	Gemma Bennett	8.22	Louise Wood	8.41	Gemma Werrett	8.41
High jump	Jessica Ennis	1.88 m	Isobel Pooley	1.85 m PB	Pamela Hughes (IRL)	1.79 m PB
Pole vault	Holly Bleasdale	4.36 m	Kate Dennison	4.26 m	Sally Peake	4.16 m PB
Long jump	Kelly Proper (IRL)	6.35 m	Dominque Blaize	6.25 m	Kim Murray	6.11 m PB
Triple jump	Laura Samuel	13.24 m PB	Hannah Frankson	13.02 m PB	Sinead Gutzmore	12.95 m PB
Shot put	Eden Francis	15.85 m	Shaunagh Brown	14.91 m PB	Sophie McKinna	14.91 m PB
