= Bethan Davies =

British racewalker (born 1990)

Personal information
- Nationality: British (Welsh)
- Born: 7 November 1990 (age 35) Cardiff, Wales
- Home town: Taffs Well, Wales
- Height: 170 cm (5 ft 7 in)
- Weight: 62 kg (137 lb)

Sport
- Sport: Racewalking
- Event: 20 km walk
- Club: Cardiff AAC
- Coached by: Andi Drake

Achievements and titles
- Personal best: 20 km walk: 1:31:53
Medal record
Women's athletics
Representing Wales
Commonwealth Games
Bronze medal – third place	2018 Gold Coast	20 km walk

Bethan Davies (born 7 November 1990) is a British racewalker who competes in the 20 kilometres walk event. She was the bronze medallist at the 2018 Commonwealth Games and has represented her country at the World Championships in Athletics and IAAF World Race Walking Team Championships. She holds the indoor British record in the 3000 metres walk (12:44.99 minutes) and the Commonwealth record for the indoor 5000 metres walk (21:25.37 minutes).

== Career ==
Born in Cardiff, she studied neuroscience at the University of Leeds and ran cross country for the varsity team. She began racewalking after filling in for her team in the event and had the opportunity to compete against elite walker Johanna Jackson. She began training and learning the sport under coach Andi Drake.

She broke through at national level in 2012, winning the British under-20 title in the 10,000 metres walk before placing third at the 2012 British Athletics Championships in the 5000 m distance. Davies became the British 5000 metres walk champion the following year after winnign the 2013 British Athletics Championships and also made her debut over 20 km, making her international debut at the 2013 European Race Walking Cup and placing third in the 20 km national championship. She missed most of the 2014 season, but returned in 2015 with runner-up placings nationally over 5000 m and 20 km. She won national titles indoors and outdoors in 2016, though she failed to finish the 20 km races at the 2016 IAAF World Race Walking Team Championships and the Dudinská Päťdesiatka.

Davies had a breakthrough in the 2017 season. She won the 5000 m walk at the 2017 British Athletics Championships then represented Great Britain at the 2017 European Race Walking Cup (finishing 22nd) and at the 2017 World Championships in Athletics held in London, where she ranked 29th overall. She described the latter experience as her best ever, having the home crowd cheer her on and call out her name. She also finished sixth at the Oceania Race Walking Championships, taking part as a guest.

In 2022, Davies won her seventh British title.

== International competitions ==
Year	Competition	Venue	Position	Event	Notes
2013	European Race Walking Cup	Dudince, Slovakia	45th	20 km walk	1:54:11
2016	World Race Walking Team Championships	Rome, Italy	—	20 km walk	DQ
2017	European Race Walking Cup	Poděbrady, Czech Republic	22nd	20 km walk	1:36:04
2017	World Championships	London, United Kingdom	29th	20 km walk	1:33:10
2018	Commonwealth Games	Gold Cost, Australia	3rd	20 km walk	1:36:08

== National titles ==
- British Athletics Championships
  - 5000 m walk: 2013, 2016, 2017, 2018, 2019, 2021, 2022
- British Indoor Athletics Championships
  - 3000 m walk: 2016
  - 5000 m walk: 2018
