= Natasha Phillips =

British athlete

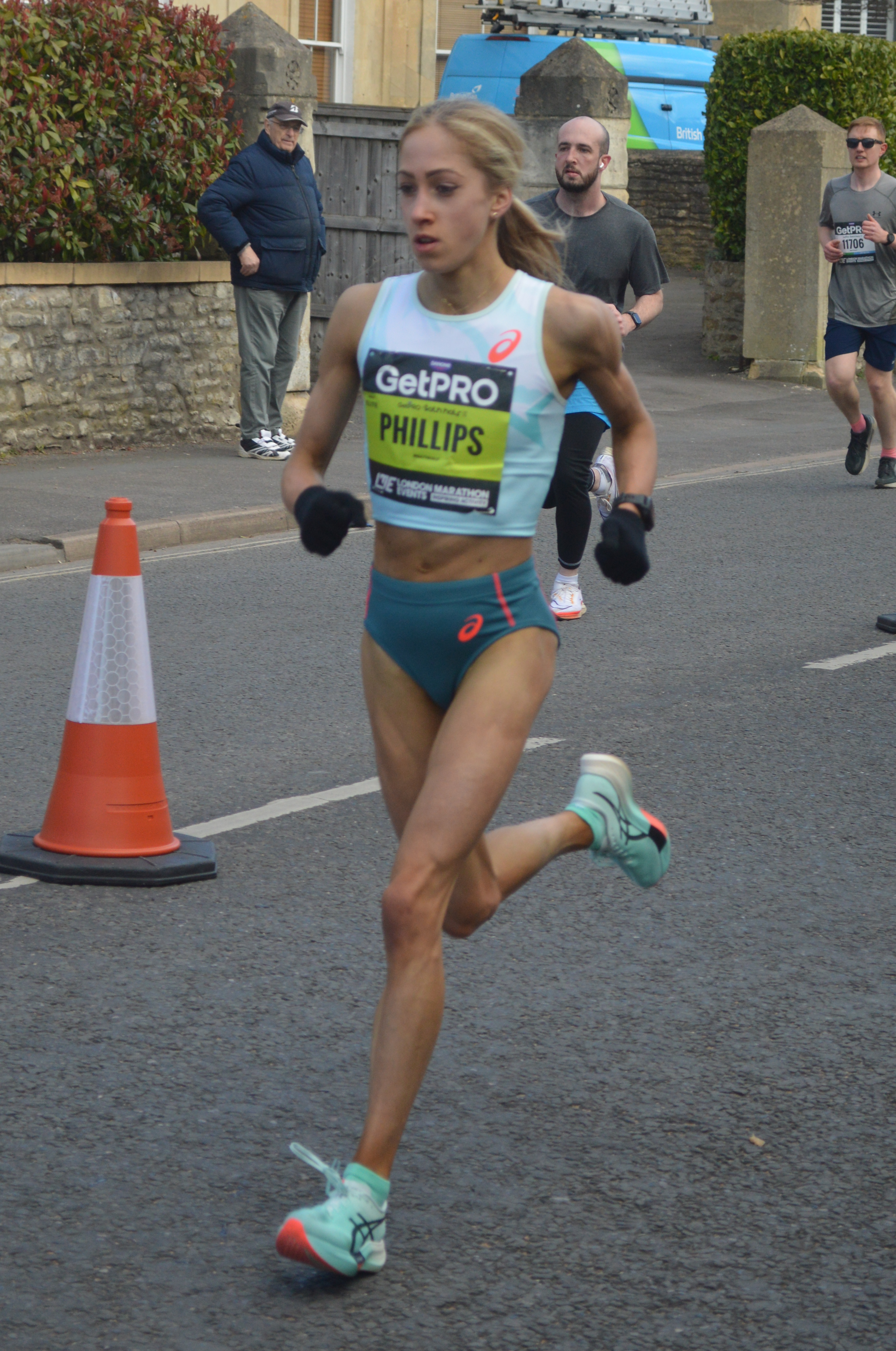
- Natasha Phillips running the 2025 Bath Half Marathon

Personal information
- Nationality: Scottish
- Born: 1 March 2005 (age 21)

Sport
- Sport: Athletics
- Event: Long distance running

Achievements and titles
- Personal bests: 1500m: 4:38.95 (Livingstone, 2022); 3000m: 9:33.16 (Glasgow, 2022); 5000m: 16:18.50 (Chelmsford, 2023); Half marathon: 70:18 (Valencia, 2024) AU20R

Natasha Phillips (born 1 March 2005) is a Scottish runner. In 2023, she broke the European U20 record for the half marathon at the Antrim Coast Half Marathon. She then broke the record again at the Valencia Half Marathon in 2024 in a time of 70:18.

== Early life ==
From Dundee, she was a competitive swimmer and triathlete before concentrating on athletics. She studies at the University of Dundee.

== Career ==
A Dundee Hawkhill Harriers athlete, she represented Scotland at the WMRA International Youth Cup in Italy in 2022. That year, she came third in the Scottish National Cross Country Championships and sixth in the UK Inter-Counties across Country Championships.

In March 2023, she became the Scottish half marathon champion in Inverness in a course record of 71:53 to break the previous women’s mark of 73:21 set by Kenya’s Cathy Mutwa in 2007. In May 2023, she won the Scottish national title and set a British-born U18 record for the 10 km of 33:00 in Glasgow.

In August 2023, she ran at the 2023 European Athletics U20 Championships in Jerusalem, finishing fourth in the 5000 metres. That month, she set a British and European U20 record for the half marathon of 1:11:20 in Antrim.

In October 2023, she won the half marathon at the Great Scottish Run in Glasgow in a time of 1:12:23.

In March 2024, she was selected for the 2024 World Athletics Cross Country Championships in Serbia alongside Eliza Nicholson and Innes FitzGerald. She finished in 30th place, as Britain finished fifth in the team U20 event. Competing at the Valencia Half Marathon on October 27, she set a new personal best and European under-20 record time of 70:18.

She finished second to Abbie Donnelly at the Bath Half Marathon on 16 March 2025, which acted as the official British Athletics trial race for the World Athletics Road Running Championships half marathon. She was selected for the Half Marathon race at the 2025 European Road Running Championships in April 2025 in Leuven, Belgium but had to pull out with injury.

Phillips was runner-up to Poppy Tank at the Battersea 10k in a personal best time of 32:33 in February 2026.
