= Chris Maddocks =

British Olympic race walker and journalist, born 1957

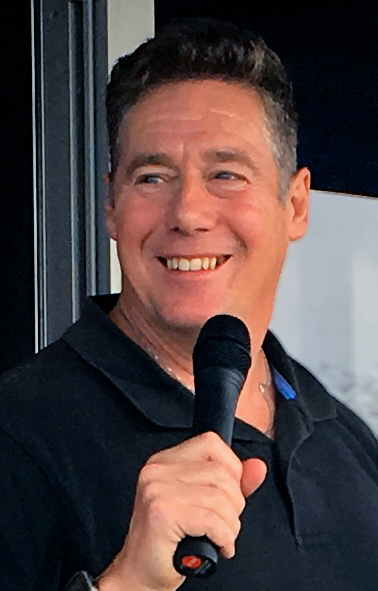
- Maddocks commentating at the International 100 Mile Centurion Championship 2018

Personal information
- Full name: Christopher Lloyd Maddocks
- Nationality: British
- Born: 28 March 1957 (age 69) Tiverton, Devon

Sport
- Country: Great Britain
- Sport: Athletics
- Event: Racewalking
- Retired: 2002

Achievements and titles
- Olympic finals: 1984 - 50 km - 16th 1988 - 20 km - 24th 1992 - 20 km - 16th 1996 - 50 km - 34th 2000 - 50 km - 39th
- World finals: 1983 - 50 km - 9th 1989 - 20 km - 15th
- Regional finals: 2000 European - 20 km - 49th
- Updated on 16 July 2012

Christopher Lloyd Maddocks (born 28 March 1957) is a male retired race walker from Great Britain. He competed in five consecutive Summer Olympics for his native country, starting in 1984. In his final competitive race, the 50 km walk at the 2000 Summer Olympics in Sydney, Australia, he overcame a hamstring injury to finish in last place. In completing the race, he set the record as the first British track athlete to compete in five Olympic Games. Following his retirement, he became a sports journalist.

== Athletic career ==
Born in Tiverton, Devon, he started in athletics as a cross country runner, and had ambitions to run marathons. Prior to the 1980 Summer Olympics in Moscow, he set a new British record in the 50 km walk, winning in Gydinia. In spite of achieving the Olympic qualifying time, he was not selected for the Games. He broke the record again winning in Paris a month after the Olympics. He then retired from the sport on a "semi-basis" for two and a half years.

In 1983, Maddocks improved his British 50 km record again with a ninth-place finish at the IAAF World Cup in Bergen, Norway. He made his first Olympic appearance at the 1984 Summer Olympics in Los Angeles, finishing his race in sixteenth place. Maddocks was runner up in the English Commonwealth Games trials in 1986, qualifying him for the 1986 Commonwealth Games in Edinburgh. At the Games, he finished the race in fourth position. At the 1988 Summer Olympics in Seoul, South Korea, he finished in 24th position in the men's 20 km walk.

In November 1989, Maddocks was part of an invited elite field of international race walkers in the New York Marathon. He finished second behind Mexican Carlos Mercenario in a British record 3 hours 14 minutes 37 seconds. The following year, he regained the British 50 km record at Burrator, England, with a winning time of 3 hours 51 minutes 37 seconds.

Maddocks's final international race was at the Sydney 2000 Summer Olympics. He had set an Olympic qualifying time of 3 hours 57 minutes and 10 seconds when winning the Dutch 50 km championship race in March 2000. Prior to the games he was refused National Lottery funding and he could not find a shoe sponsor, although ASICS sent him a complimentary pair. He injured his hamstring before the race but entered the race nonetheless; he fell behind the rest of the athletes. He entered the Stadium Australia as I'm Gonna Be (500 Miles) by The Proclaimers was played over the loudspeakers in his honour, and as the 100,000 crowd cheered him on to finish. His time was 4 hours, 52 minutes and 4 seconds, more than an hour after Robert Korzeniowski won the race. His completion of the race meant that he became the first British track athlete to compete in five Olympic Games. Tessa Sanderson remains the record holder in all sports, having appeared at six Olympic Games for Great Britain.

After the 2000 Summer Olympics, his lack of an honour in the New Years Honours List was criticised as he took a break from competitive athletics.

== Journalist and Commentator ==
In April 2002, two months after he started studying journalism at University of Leeds, Maddocks announced his retirement from professional athletics.

He won an award for services to athletics at the 2000 British Athletics Writers Awards, having become a freelance journalist following his retirement from professional athletics. He was an analyst for the racewalking events for American television network NBC in 2012 Summer Olympics and 2016 Summer Olympics. He also commentates at sporting events such as the National 100 mile Centurion Walking championship in 2018.

== Personal life ==
Maddocks lives in Devon Whilst he competed, he worked as a veterinary assistant in Plymouth.

== Autobiography ==
Chris struggled with his inner demons for many years before writing his autobiography. "Money Walks" was published to coincide with the 2012 Olympics, at which time Chris was a specialist TV sports commentator for NBC. The book is available on Amazon.

== Publication ==
Money Walks - An autobiography by five-time Olympian Chris Maddocks (2012). Short Run Press Ltd. ISBN 978-0875424347
