= Chris Snook =

British athlete

Personal information
- Nationality: British (English)
- Born: 14 January 2000 (age 26)

Sport
- Sport: Athletics
- Event: Race Walking
- Club: AFD

Achievements and titles
- Personal best(s): 3000m walk: 11:45.68 (Birmingham, 2024); 5000m walk: 20:31.60 (Manchester, 2024)
Medal record
Representing Great Britain
British Athletics Championships
Gold medal – first place	2024 Manchester	5000m walk
Gold medal – first place	2023 Manchester	5000m walk
British Athletics Indoor Championships
Gold medal – first place	2024 Birmingham	3000m walk
Gold medal – first place	2022 Birmingham	3000m walk

Christopher Snook (born 14 January 2000) is a British track and field athlete. In 2023 and 2024 he was British national champion in the 5000m race walk, and in 2022 and 2024 the British indoor champion at the 3000 metres race walk.

== Biography ==
Snook races for Aldershot, Farnham and District Athletics Club. In February 2022, Snook won the first ever England Athletics Winter Race Walking Championships titles over 10,000m in Leeds. That month, he won the 2022 British Indoor Athletics Championships title in Birmingham.

In March 2023, Snook was selected to represent England at the Korzeniowski Warsaw Race Walking Cup.

On 10 June 2023, he won the senior titles at the British Grand Prix of Race Walking over 20,000 metres, held at Leeds Beckett Athletics Centre.

Snook won the UK Athletics Championships men's 5000 metres race walk title, in Manchester, in July 2023.

In the 3000m race walk at the 2024 British Indoor Athletics Championships in February 2024, Snook won the British title with a personal best time of 11:45.68.

He was runner-up to Cameron Corbishley in the 5000m at the 2025 UK Athletics Championships on 3 August 2025 in Birmingham.

== Personal life ==
He is the son of former international race walker Verity Snook-Larby.
