= Mike Edwards (high jumper) =

British-Nigerian high jumper, born 1990

Personal information
- Nationality: British/Nigerian
- Born: 11 July 1990 (age 35) Manchester, England

Sport
- Sport: Athletics
- Event: High jump
- Club: Birchfield Harriers
- Coached by: Cliff Rovelto

Achievements and titles
- Personal bests: Outdoor: 2.25 m (2015); Indoor: 2.22 m (2014)

Michael Olayemi Edwards (born 11 July 1990) is a British-Nigerian retired high jumper who competed internationally for Nigeria and Great Britain. He is a multiple-time national champion and has represented Nigeria at major international competitions, including the Commonwealth Games and African Championships in Athletics.

== Early life and education ==
Edwards was born in Manchester, England, to a Jamaican father and Nigerian mother. At the age of 10, he moved to the United States, settling in Florida. He attended Poinciana High School, where he excelled in athletics, particularly the high jump, clearing over 7 feet during his high school career. He continued his athletic development at the University of Alabama and later at the University of Louisville, before transferring to Embry-Riddle Aeronautical University. At Embry-Riddle, Edwards won both the National Association of Intercollegiate Athletics (NAIA) Indoor and Outdoor National Championships in the high jump in 2013, setting school records of 2.18 meters indoors and 2.16 meters outdoors.

== Career ==
Edwards initially competed for Great Britain, finishing ninth at the 2009 European Athletics Junior Championships with a clearance of 2.11 meters. In April 2018, he switched allegiance to Nigeria and began representing the country in international competitions. That year, he placed fourth at the African Championships in Athletics in Asaba with a jump of 2.15 meters.

In 2022, Edwards won the silver medal at the African Championships in Port Louis, Mauritius, clearing 2.15 meters. This achievement marked Nigeria's first medal in the men's high jump at the African Championships since 1996.

At the 2022 Commonwealth Games in Birmingham, Edwards represented Nigeria and finished sixth in the men's high jump final with a clearance of 2.19 meters.

Edwards is also a two-time Nigerian national champion, securing titles in 2021 and 2022. In 2022, he clinched the gold medal at the Nigerian World Championships/Commonwealth Games Trials in Benin City with a season's best of 2.20 meters.

In 2024, Edwards made his boxing debut and defeated Jake Cornish by unanimous decision.

In 2019, Edwards was a contestant on Big Brother Naija season 4 and finished as runner-up.

== Personal bests ==
- Outdoor high jump: 2.25 m (Birmingham, 19 July 2015)
- Indoor high jump: 2.22 m (Hustopeče, 1 February 2014)

== Personal life ==
Beyond athletics, Edwards is an entrepreneur, founding Aireyys, a company specializing in cigars and grooming products. He is married to British athlete Perri Shakes-Drayton.
