= Tom Bosworth =

British race walker (born 1990)

Tom Bosworth MBE
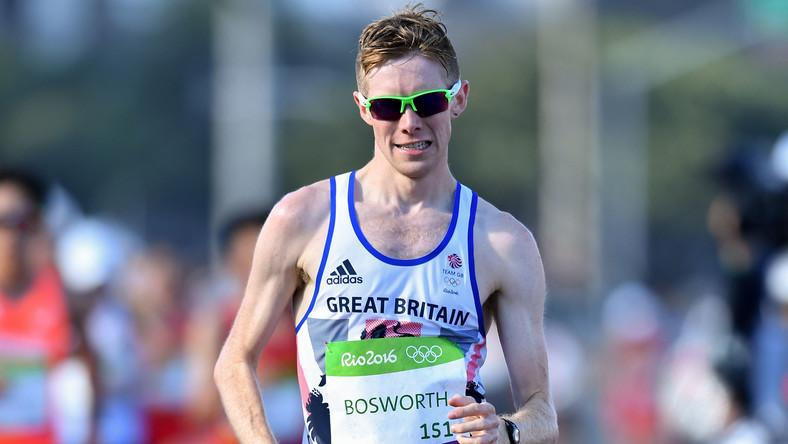
- Bosworth competing in the Men's 20km Race Walk at the 2016 Summer Olympics in Rio de Janeiro

Personal information
- Nationality: British
- Born: Thomas Stewart Bosworth; 17 January 1990 (age 36) Sevenoaks, England, UK
- Height: 1.77 m (5 ft 10 in)
- Weight: 56 kg (123 lb)
- Website: www.tombosworth.com

Sport
- Country: England, United Kingdom
- Sport: Race walking
- Event(s): 1mile, 3km, 5km, 10km, 20km
- College team: Leeds Beckett Uni
- Club: Tonbridge AC
- Coached by: Andi Drake (Peter Selby)

Achievements and titles
- Olympic finals: 6th
- World finals: 7th
- Highest world ranking: 2017 1Mile walk world best and 2018 3km race walk world best (indoor and outdoor)
- Personal best: 1:19:38 for 20k
Medal record
Men's athletics
Representing England
Commonwealth Games
Silver medal – second place	2018 Gold Coast	20 km race walk
British Championships
Silver medal – second place	2010 Birmingham	5000m race walk
Gold medal – first place	2011 Birmingham	5000m race walk
Silver medal – second place	2012 Birmingham	5000m race walk
Silver medal – second place	2013 Birmingham	5000m race walk
Silver medal – second place	2014 Birmingham	5000m race walk
Gold medal – first place	2015 Birmingham	5000m race walk
Silver medal – second place	2016 Birmingham	5000m race walk
Gold medal – first place	2017 Birmingham	5000m race walk
Gold medal – first place	2018 Birmingham	5000m race walk
Gold medal – first place	2021 Manchester	5000m race walk
British Indoor Championships
Gold medal – first place	2015 Sheffield	3000m race walk
Gold medal – first place	2016 Sheffield	3000m race walk
Gold medal – first place	2017 Sheffield	5000m race walk
Gold medal – first place	2018 Birmingham	5000m race walk
Gold medal – first place	2019 Birmingham	5000m race walk
Gold medal – first place	2020 Glasgow	5000m race walk

Thomas Stewart Bosworth MBE (born 17 January 1990) is a British two-time Olympic race walker who holds three World bests, including the World Best for the 1Mile race walk, 5:31.08.

He also holds six British records, won 13 British Championships gold medals, a silver Commonwealth Games medal and is a World European Olympic Games finalist. Bosworth is currently ranked 1st overall in the UK for 20 km. He was also selected to carry the Olympic Torch through Potternewton, Leeds.

== Biography ==
Bosworth holds British records for walking 3 km, 5 km, 10 km and 20 km, with his Personal Best for 20 km at 1:19:38. He first set the 20 km British record in Dudince, Slovakia in March 2016 to beat a 20 km race walk mark set by Ian McCombie in 1988, clocking 80:41 and taking 81 seconds off McCombie's record.

He is also the British record holder for the 10 km race walk, set in 2020, along with the 5000m race walk, set in Birmingham at the 2018 British indoor team trials to qualify for the World Indoor Championships. Along with the World Record for the 1 mile race walk won at London Diamond League, 2017, Bosworth is World Record holder for the 3000m indoor race walk at IAAF Indoor Grand Prix Glasgow, 2018, and the 3000m outdoor race walk at the Muller Anniversary Games, London, 2018.

He has won eight British Outdoor Championships in 2011, 2014, 2015, 2016, 2017, 2018, 2021 and 2022 along with six British Indoor Championships, his first in 2015 followed by 2016, 2017, 2018, 2019 and 2020.

Bosworth qualified for the 2020 Summer Olympics after coming second at the 2021 British Athletics Marathon and 20km Walk Trial.

Bosworth was appointed Member of the Order of the British Empire (MBE) in the 2024 New Year Honours for services to race walking.

Bosworth retired from competition in August 2022.

== Achievements ==
=== Medals ===
Year	Competition	Event	Medal
2010	National Race Walking Championships	20 km (senior men's)	Gold
2011	British Championships Outdoor	20 km	Gold
2012	Aviva England Athletics U23 Championships & World Trials	10 km	Gold
2014	British Championships Outdoor	20 km	Gold
2015	British Championships Outdoor	5 km	Gold
2015	British Championships Indoor	3 km	Gold
2016	British Championships Outdoor	5 km	Gold
2016	British Championships Indoor	3 km	Gold
2017	British Championships Outdoor	5 km	Gold
2017	British Championships Indoor	3 km	Gold
2018	British Championships Outdoor	5 km	Gold
2018	British Championships Indoor	5 km	Gold
2018	Commonwealth Games, Australia	20 km	Silver
2019	British Championships Indoor	5 km	Gold
2019	European Cup, Lithuania	20 km	Team Silver
2020	British Championships Indoor	5 km	Gold
2021	British Championships Outdoor	5 km	Gold

=== Records held ===
Year	Competition	Event	Time	Record
2017	Muller Anniversary Games London	1 mile race walk	5:31.08	World record
2018	IAAF Indoor Grand Prix Glasgow	3 km	10:30.28	Indoor World Record
2018	Muller Anniversary Games London	3 km	10:43.84	Outdoor World Record
2020	British Indoor Championships	5 km	18:20.9	British Record
2020	England Athletics 10k Championships	10 km	39:10	British Record
2018	CWG Gold Coast Australia	20 km	1:19:38	British Record

=== Personal bests ===
Event	Time	Venue	Date	Notes
1 Mile race walk	5:31.08	London, United Kingdom	9 July 2017	World Best
3000 metres race walk	10:30.28 i	Glasgow, United Kingdom	25 February 2018	Indoor World Best
5000 metres race walk	18:20.20 i	Glasgow, United Kingdom	24 February 2020	Indoor
10 Kilometres race walk	39:10.00	Coventry, United Kingdom	1 March 2020	
20 Kilometres race walk	1:19:38	Gold Coast, Australia	8 April 2018	

=== International competitions ===
Year	Competition	Venue	Position	Event	Notes
Representing Great Britain
2009	European Race Walking Cup (U20)	Metz, France	39th	10 km walk	52:01
2011	European Race Walking Cup	Olhão, Portugal	29th	20 km walk	1:32:48
2012	World Race Walking Cup	Saransk, Russia	72nd	20 km walk	1:28:43
2013	European Race Walking Cup	Dudince, Slovakia	31st	20 km walk	1:27:42
2014	World Race Walking Cup	Taicang, China	43rd	20 km walk	1:22:53
2014	European Championships	Zurich, Switzerland	12th	20 km walk	1:23:17
2015	European Race Walking Cup	Murcia, Spain	16th	20 km walk	1:23:54
2015	World Championships	Beijing, China	24th	20 km walk	1:23:58
2016	World Race Walking Cup	Rome, Italy	34th	20 km walk	1:22:55
2016	Olympic Games	Rio de Janeiro, Brazil	6th	20 km walk	1:20:13
2017	European Race Walking Cup	Poděbrady, Czech Republic	4th	20 km walk	1:21:21
2017	World Championships	London, United Kingdom	—	20 km walk	DQ (lifting)
2018	World Race Walking Cup	Taicang, China	14th	20 km walk	1:23:54
2018	European Championships	Berlin, Germany	7th	20 km walk	1:21:31
2019	European Race Walking Cup	Alytus, Lithuania	4th	20 km walk	1:20:53
2019	World Championships	Doha, Qatar	7th	20 km walk	1:29:34
2021	European Race Walking Cup	Poděbrady, Czech Republic	15th	20 km walk	1:22:27
2021	Olympic Games	Tokyo, Japan	25th	20 km walk	1:25:57
Representing England
2009	EAA Race Walking Permit Race	Lugano, Switzerland	8th	10 km walk	45:29
2010	XIX Commonwealth Games	Delhi, India	11th	20 km walk	1:30:44
2010	EAA Race Walking Permit Race	Bedford, England	7th	20 km walk	1:28:24
2012	EAA Race Walking Permit Race	Lugano, Switzerland	28th	20 km walk	1:25:49
2012	EAA Race Walking Permit Race	A Coruña, Spain	13th	20 km walk	1:24:49
2013	EAA Race Walking Permit Race	Poděbrady, Czech Republic	14th	20 km walk	1:24:44
2014	EAA Race Walking Permit Race	Lugano, Switzerland	21st	20 km walk	1:25:45
2014	EAA Race Walking Permit Race	Poděbrady, Czech Republic	10th	20 km walk	1:22:20
2015	EAA Race Walking Permit Race	Lugano, Switzerland	4th	20 km walk	1:22:33
2018	XXI Commonwealth Games	Gold Coast, Australia	2nd	20 km walk	1:19:38

== Media and public speaking ==
Bosworth has made several media appearances, including his appearance on Sky TV's show “Game Changers”, commentating for the BBC at the 2014 European Athletics Championships, and again for Eurosport at the 2015 World Athletics Championships.

Championing LGBT rights and mental health in sport alongside his athletic career, Bosworth has spoken openly about both.

Bosworth came out as gay on the BBC's Victoria Derbyshire show on 13 October 2015. In the interview he explained that his family, friends and fellow sports athletes had known that he was gay for a number of years, and the coming out was to a wider audience to answer lingering questions from fans and to be himself. In the interview he told the BBC that he had been in "a really happy relationship" for the last four-and-a-half years. He proposed to and was accepted by his now-fiancé, Harry Dineley on Copacabana Beach during the Rio Olympics.

In 2018, he said that he was ready to risk prison to defend LGBT rights in Qatar during the 2019 World Athletics Championships.

In publications by the BBC, SkySports and the Telegraph among many others, Bosworth speaks about his mental health and how he overcame a period of depression. Alongside media appearances, he now also regularly visits schools and universities, to talk about his experiences as a professional athlete, LGBT equality, the importance of mental health and how sport can be of great benefit.

He has also spoken to the Culture, Media and Sport parliamentary committee, met with the Chairman of the FA to discuss homophobia in football, written piece for the Times Sport Newspaper on “drugs in sport”, addressed National Governing Bodies on behalf of Sport England and spoken at Wembley for Stonewall F.C.
