= 500 metres =

Track running event

Athletics 500 metres

World records
- Men: (Kenya) David Rudisha 57.69 (2016)
- Women: (Netherlands) Femke Bol 1:05.63 (2023)

The 500 metres is an uncommon middle-distance running event in track and field and road running competitions.

== All-time top 25 ==
- i = indoor performance
- OT = oversized track (exceeding 200m in circumference)
- A = affected by altitude
- h = hand timing

=== Men ===
- Correct as of September 2026.

Rank	Surface	Result	Athlete	Nationality	Date	Place	Ref.
1	Road	57.69	David Rudisha	Kenya	10 September 2016	Newcastle	
2	Road	57.91	Mark English	Ireland	10 September 2016	Newcastle	
3	Road	59.02	Martyn Rooney	Great Britain	10 September 2016	Newcastle	
4	Road	59.18	Sebastian Rodger	Great Britain	10 September 2016	Newcastle	
5	Road	59.26	Nijel Amos	Botswana	9 September 2017	Newcastle	
6	Road	59.30	Jack Green	Great Britain	10 September 2016	Newcastle	
7	Track	59.32	Orestes Rodriguez	Cuba	5 February 2013	Havana	
8	Track i	59.83	Abdalleleh Haroun	Qatar	17 February 2016	Stockholm	
9	Track i	59.87	Brian Herron	United States	3 December 2022	Louisville	
10	Road	59.93	Elliot Giles	Great Britain	10 September 2016	Newcastle	
11	Track i	1:00.06	Brycen Spratling	United States	14 February 2015	New York City	
12	Track	1:00.08	Donato Sabia	Italy	26 May 1984	Busto Arsizio	
13	Track i	1:00.11	Vernon Norwood	United States	11 February 2017	New York City	
14	Track	1:00.13	Julio Arenas	Spain	29 May 2026	Fuenlabrada	
15	Track i	1:00.17	Ken Lowery	United States	16 January 1987	Indianapolis	
16	Track i	1:00.19	Mark Everett	United States	28 February 1992	New York City	
17	Track	1:00.20	David Barroso	Spain	20 May 2026	Villafranca de los Barros	
18	Track i	1:00.22	Quincy Wilson	United States	28 February 2026	Philadelphia	
19	Track	1:00.25	Eliezer Zolawo	Spain	29 May 2026	Fuenlabrada	
20	Track	1:00.27	Davide Re	Italy	24 April 2018	Rieti	
21	Track	1:00.35	Pavel Maslák	Czech Republic	3 August 2013	Cheb	
22	Track	1:00.42	Vladimir Aceti	Italy	27 April 2025	Busto Arsizio	
23	Track i	1:00.43	Mike Berry	United States	14 February 2015	New York City	
24	Track i OT A	1:00.44	John Patterson	United States	8 March 1986	Flagstaff	
25	Track i	1:00.45	Michael Franks	United States	16 January 1987	Indianapolis	

==== Notes ====
The times, above, for Newcastle were set on a straight road track.

Below is a list of other times equal or superior to 1:00.45:

- Mark English also ran 59.60 on a road (2015).
- Colin Campbell ran a hand-timed 59.7 (at altitude) (1968).
- Davide Re ran a 1:00.30 on a track (2020)
- Pavel Maslák also ran 1:00.36 i (2014).
- Brycen Spratling also ran also ran 1:00.37 on an oversized indoor track (2013).

==== Times rejected ====
- Roddie Haley ran 59.82 i in Oklahoma City on 15 March 1986, but this time was rejected as a record due to an incorrectly measured track. Haley also ran a 59.90 i in Oklahoma City on 14 March 1987, but this time was rejected as a record for the same reason.

=== Women ===
- Correct as of February 2023.

Rank	Surface	Result	Athlete	Nationality	Date	Place	Ref.
1	Track i	1:05.63	Femke Bol	Netherlands	4 February 2023	Boston	
2	Track	1:05.9 h	Tatana Kocembova	Czechoslovakia	2 August 1984	Ostrava	
3	Track i	1:06.31	Olesya Krasnomovets	Russia	7 January 2006	Yekaterinburg	
4	Road	1:06.62	Lynsey Sharp	Great Britain	10 September 2016	Newcastle	
5	Road	1:06.69	Perri Shakes-Drayton	Great Britain	9 September 2017	Newcastle	
6	Road	1:06.70	Anyika Onuora	Great Britain	9 September 2017	Newcastle	
7	Track i	1:06.76	Olga Zaytseva	Russia	7 January 2006	Yekaterinburg	
8	Road	1:06.89	Shelayna Oskan-Clarke	Great Britain	10 September 2016	Newcastle	
9	Road	1:07.19	Lisanne de Witte	Netherlands	9 September 2017	Newcastle	
10	Track i	1:07.34	Courtney Okolo	United States	11 February 2017	New York City	
11	Track i	1:07.36	Natalya Nazarova	Russia	8 January 2004	Moscow	
12	Road	1:07.45	Adelle Tracey	Great Britain	10 September 2016	Newcastle	
13	Road	1:07.46	Christine Ohuruogu	Great Britain	6 September 2014	Newcastle	
14	Road	1:07.53	Laviai Nielsen	Great Britain	10 September 2016	Newcastle	
15	Track i	1:07.67	Olga Nazarova	Soviet Union	1988		
16	Track i	1:07.68	Olga Kotlyarova	Russia	7 January 2004	Yekaterinburg	
17	Road	1:08.11	Eilidh Child	Great Britain	6 September 2014	Newcastle	
18	Road	1:08.19	Mary Abichi	Great Britain	8 September 2018	Gateshead	
19	Road	1:08.27	Seren Bundy-Davies	Great Britain	10 September 2016	Newcastle	
20	Road	1:08.29	Līga Velvere	Latvia	8 September 2018	Gateshead	
21	Track i	1:08.34	Leah Anderson	Jamaica	4 February 2023	Boston	
22	Track i	1:08.40	Sage Watson	Canada	3 February 2017	New York City	
23	Road	1:08.47	Jenny Meadows	Great Britain	6 September 2014	Newcastle	
24	Track i	1:08.59	Kennedy Simon	United States	3 December 2022	Louisville	
25	Track i	1:08.6 h	Ana Ambraziene	Soviet Union	30 January 1988	Vilnius	

==== Notes ====
Below is a list of other times equal or superior to 1:08.6:

- Anyika Onuora also ran 1:06.94 on a road (2018), and 1:07.04 on a road (2016).
- Lynsey Sharp also ran 1:07.48 on a road (2017), 1:07.73 on a road (2018), and 1:08.05 on a road (2014).
- Olga Kotlyarova also ran 1:07.74 i (2007).
