= British Indoor Athletics Championships =

Sporting tournament

The British Indoor Athletics Championships is the annual national championship in indoor track and field for the United Kingdom, organised by UK Athletics. Eight track and five field events for both men and women are contested, with athletes being invited to compete, after reaching qualifying standards. In even numbered years, the competition acts as a qualifier for the World Indoor Championships, and in odd numbered years it is a qualifier for the European Indoor Championships.

First held in 2007, the competition replaced the AAA Indoor Championships, organised by the Amateur Athletic Association of England, which had served as the de facto national championship since 1935. Racewalking events were added to the programme in 2015.

== Editions ==
Year	City	Venue	Events
2007	Sheffield	EIS Sheffield	24
2008	Sheffield	EIS Sheffield	24
2009	Sheffield	EIS Sheffield	24
2010	Sheffield	EIS Sheffield	24
2011	Sheffield	EIS Sheffield	24
2012	Sheffield	EIS Sheffield	24
2013	Sheffield	EIS Sheffield	24
2014	Sheffield	EIS Sheffield	24
2015	Sheffield	EIS Sheffield	26
2016	Sheffield	EIS Sheffield	26
2017	Sheffield	EIS Sheffield	26
2018	Birmingham	Arena Birmingham	26
2019	Birmingham	Arena Birmingham	26
2020	Glasgow	Emirates Arena	26
2021	Cancelled due to the COVID-19 pandemic		
2022	Birmingham	Arena Birmingham	26
2023	Birmingham	Arena Birmingham	26
2024	Birmingham	Arena Birmingham	26
2025	Birmingham	Arena Birmingham	26
2026	Birmingham	Arena Birmingham	26

== Events ==
Sprints	Middle/Long Distance	Jumps	Throws	Race walks
60 metres	800 metres	High jump	Shot put	3000 metres race walk
200 metres	1500 metres	Long jump		5000 metres race walk
400 metres	3000 metres	Triple jump		
60 metres hurdles		Pole vault		

== Championships Records ==
=== Men ===
Event	Record	Athlete	Date	Meet	Location	Ref.
60 m	6.49	Jason Gardener	7 February 2004	2004 AAA Indoor Championships	Sheffield	
200 m	20.46	Julian Golding	8 February 1998	1998 AAA Indoor Championships	Birmingham	
400 m	45.71	Solomon Wariso	8 February 1998	1998 AAA Indoor Championships	Birmingham	
800 m	1:46.49	Tom McKean	10 March 1990	1990 AAA Indoor Championships	Cosford	
1500 m	3:38.12	Jack Higgins	15 February 2026	2026 Championships	Birmingham	
3000 m	7:40.16	George Mills	23 February 2025	2025 Championships	Birmingham	
High jump	2.31 m	Tom Parsons / Robbie Grabarz	13 February 2011 / 10 February 2013	2011 Championships / 2013 Championships	Sheffield	
Pole vault	5.65 m	Adam Hague	18 February 2018	2018 Championships	Birmingham	
Long jump	8.03 m	Stewart Faulkner	10 March 1990	1990 AAA Indoor Championships	Cosford	
Triple jump	17.30 m	Philips Idowu	13 February 2005	2005 AAA Indoor Championships	Sheffield	
Shot put	20.86 m	Scott Lincoln	23 February 2025	2025 Championships	Birmingham	
3000 m walk	10:58.21	Tom Bosworth	28 February 2016	2016 Championships	Sheffield	
5000 m walk	18:20.97	Tom Bosworth	23 February 2020	2020 Championships	Glasgow	

=== Women ===
Event	Athlete	Record	Date	Meet	Location	Ref.
60 m	7.05	Dina Asher-Smith	14 February 2026	2026 Championships	Birmingham	
200 m	22.95	Renee Regis	15 February 2026	2026 Championships	Birmingham	
800 m	1:56.33 NR	Keely Hodgkinson	14 February 2026	2026 Championships	Birmingham	
1500 m	4:06.73	Ellie Baker	19 February 2023	2023 Championships	Birmingham	
3000 m	8:41.75	Hannah Nuttall	15 February 2026	2026 Championships	Birmingham	
Pole vault	4.85 m	Molly Caudery	17 February 2024	2024 Championships	Birmingham	
Long jump	6.75 m	Lorraine Ugen	27 February 2022	2022 Championships	Birmingham	
Shot put	18.82 m	Sophie McKinna	27 February 2022	2022 Championships	Birmingham	
Pentathlon	4365 pts	Ella Rush	27 February 2022	2022 Championships	Birmingham	
Pentathlon	60m H / High jump / Shot put / Long jump / 800m; 8.89 / 1.76 m / 12.88 m / 6.34 m / 2:19.60					
3000 m walk	12:44.99	Bethan Davies	28 February 2016	2016 Championships	Sheffield	
5000 m walk	21:25.37	Bethan Davies	18 February 2018	2018 Championships	Birmingham	
