= Adidas Games =

Annual track and field meeting and street meet

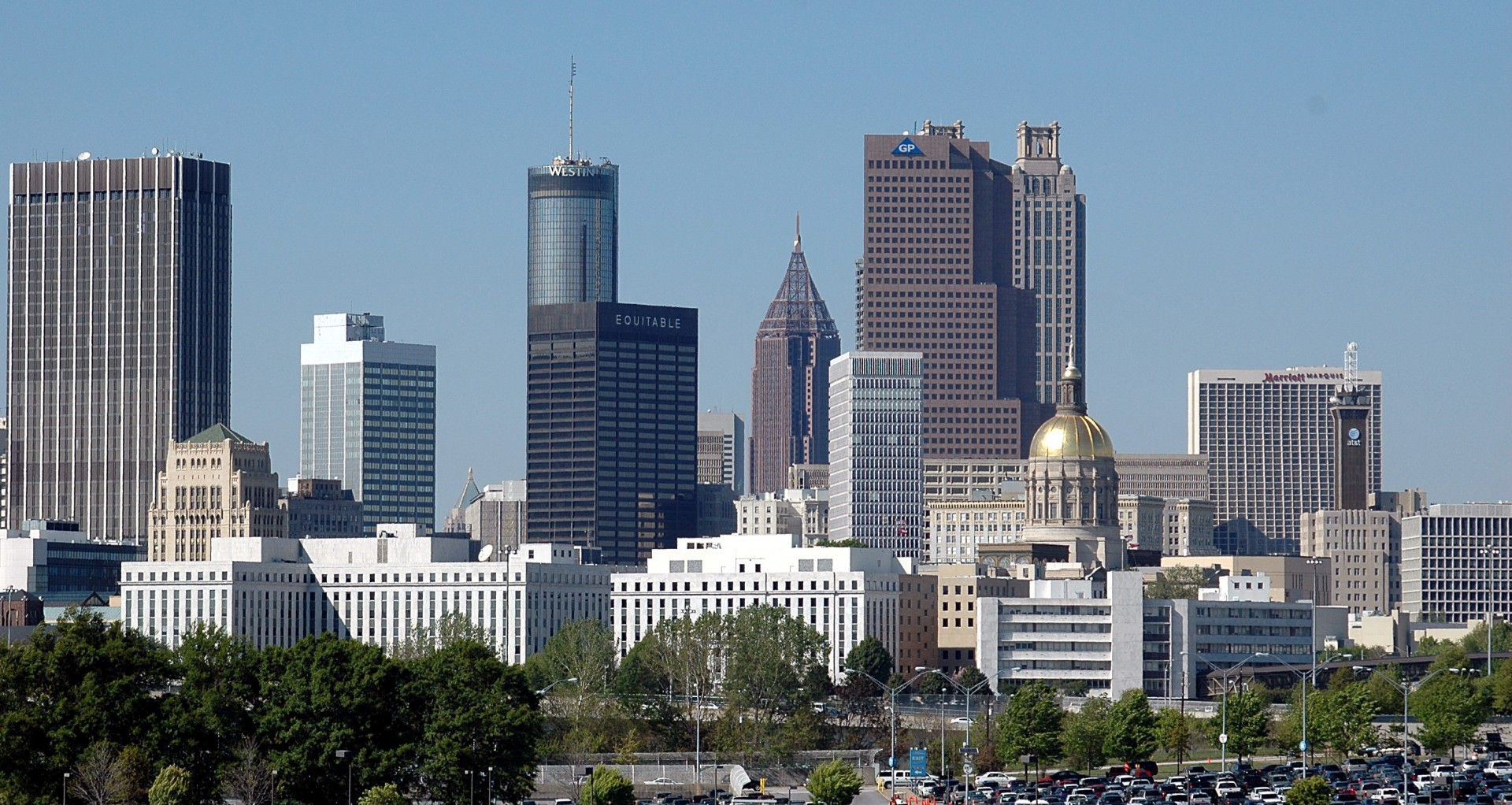
- Atlanta, where the street meet portion of the meeting is held since 2023
- Date: May
- Location: Atlanta, Georgia (formerly Boston, Massachusetts) (United States)
- Event type: Track and field
- Established: 2016

The Adidas Games, formerly the adidas BOOST Boston Games and today officially known as the adidas Atlanta City Games, is an annual track and field meeting and street meet in Atlanta, Georgia. The event was originally held in Boston, Massachusetts from 2016 to 2021, and it was relocated to the City of Atlanta in 2023. The event was announced on the same day the Adidas Grand Prix meet in New York was removed from the Diamond League schedule in 2016.

When the meet was held in Boston, the traditional track events were held in the Henry G. Steinbrenner Stadium on the campus of the Massachusetts Institute of Technology, while the street meet portion was held on an elevated straight track constructed between Boston Common and the Boston Public Garden. Currently, it is held in Piedmont Park (the finish line of the Peachtree Road Race, with junior events at Eddie S Henderson Stadium across the street.

The event has hosted several Olympic track and field athletes, including 400 m world record holder and Rio gold medalist Wayde van Niekerk in 2017.

== Event records ==
=== Men ===
==== Track portion ====
| Event | Record | Athlete | Nation | Date | Ref |
|---|---|---|---|---|---|
| 400 m | 44.28 | Wayde van Niekerk | South Africa | 2017 | |
| 800 m | 1:45.18 | Brandon McBride | Canada | 20 May 2018 | |
| 1500 m | 3:35.82 | Collins Cheboi | Kenya | 2017 | |
| Mile | 3:56.72 | Drew Hunter | United States | 20 May 2018 | |
| 3000 m | 7:45.64 | Cyrus Rutto | Kenya | 20 May 2018 | |
| 5000 m | 12:59.89 | Dejen Gebremeskel | Ethiopia | 2017 | |
| 400 m hurdles | 48.69 | Michael Stigler | United States | 2016 | |

==== Street portion ====
| Event | Record | Athlete | Nation | Date | Place | Ref |
|---|---|---|---|---|---|---|
| 100 m | 9.90 (-0.4 m/s) | Akani Simbine | South Africa | 19 May 2024 | Atlanta | |
| 150 m (straight) | 14.41 (+0.3 m/s) | Noah Lyles | United States | 18 May 2024 | Atlanta | |
| 200 m (straight) | 19.84 | Wayde van Niekerk | South Africa | 2016 | Boston | |
| 600 m | 1:15 | Marco Arop | Canada | 23 May 2021 | Boston | |
| Mile | 4:01 | Clayton Murphy | United States | 23 May 2021 | Boston | |
| 110 m hurdles | 13.07 (-0.7 m/s) | Grant Holloway | United States | 19 May 2024 | Atlanta | |
| 200 m hurdles (straight) | 21.85 (+1.5 m/s) | Alison dos Santos | Brazil | 17 May 2025 | Atlanta | |
| Pole vault | 5.83 m | Matt Ludwig | United States | 17 May 2025 | Atlanta | |
| Long jump | 8.33 m (+1.6 m/s) | Carey McLeod | Jamaica | 17 May 2025 | Atlanta | |

=== Women ===
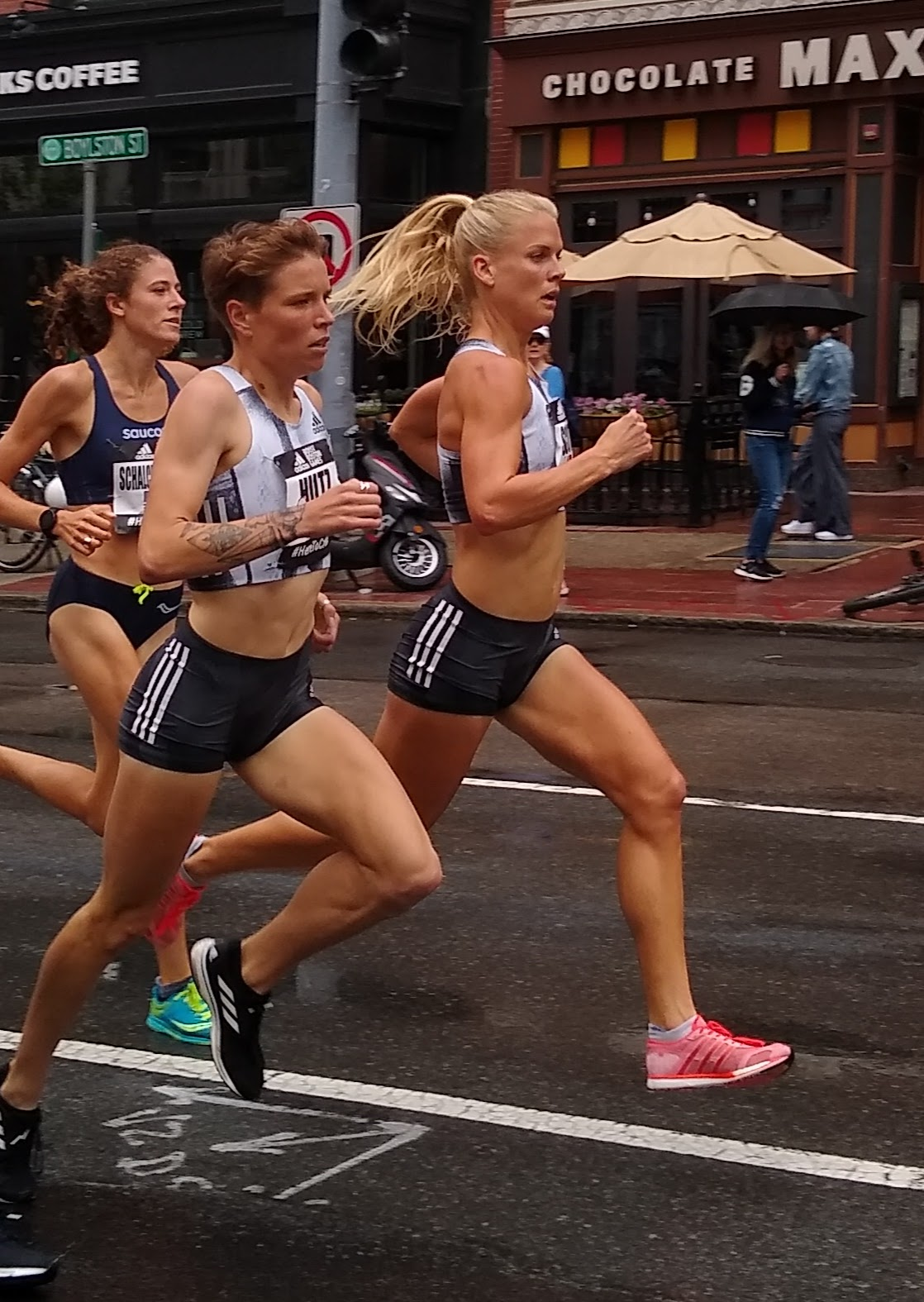
Nikki Hiltz (left) and Dominique Scott (right) running the Back Bay Mile at the Adidas Boost Boston Games in 2019.

==== Track portion ====
| Event | Record | Athlete | Nation | Date | Ref |
|---|---|---|---|---|---|
| 800 m | 1:59.27 | Ajeé Wilson | United States | 20 May 2018 | |
| 1500 m | 4:04.65 | Dawit Seyaum | Ethiopia | 20 May 2018 | |
| 5000 m | 15:55.24 | Caroline Kipkirui | Kenya | 20 May 2018 | |

==== Street portion ====
| Event | Record | Athlete | Nation | Date | Ref |
|---|---|---|---|---|---|
| 100 m | 10.88 (+0.5 m/s) | Aleia Hobbs | United States | 19 May 2024 | |
| 150 m (straight) | 15.85 (+2.0 m/s) | Favour Ofili | Nigeria | 17 May 2025 | |
| 200 m (straight) | 21.76 (+0.5 m/s) | Shaunae Miller-Uibo | Bahamas | 4 June 2017 | |
| 600 m | 1:24 | Natoya Goule | Jamaica | 23 May 2021 | |
| Mile | 4:31 | Nikki Hiltz | United States | 23 May 2021 | |
| 100 m hurdles | 12.49 (-0.9 m/s) | Kendra Harrison | United States | 23 May 2021 | |
| 200 m hurdles (straight) | 24.86 (+0.1 m/s) | Shiann Salmon | Jamaica | 23 May 2021 | |
| Long jump | 7.17 m (+0.1 m/s) | Tara Davis-Woodhall | United States | 19 May 2024 | |
