= Athas =

Athas may refer to:

== People with the given name ==
- Athas Hrysoulakis (born 1969), Australian rules footballer

== People with the surname ==
- Alexander Athas (1922–2009), American basketball player
- Daphne Athas (1923–2020), American author
- Iqbal Athas (1944–2026), Sri Lankan journalist
- Pete Athas (1946–2015), American football player
- Rocky Athas (born 1954), American songwriter and guitarist

== Other uses ==
- Athas (fictional planet), in the Dungeons & Dragons fantasy role-playing game

== See also ==
- Atha (disambiguation)
