= Masters M90 pole vault world record progression =

This is the progression of world record improvements of the pole vault M90 division of Masters athletics.

Key

Incomplete information Pending

Height	Athlete	Nationality	Birthdate	Location	Date
2.05	William Bell	United States	19.03.1922	Olathe	12.07.2013
1.82	Donald Pellmann	United States	12.08.1915	Fort Collins	04.09.2005
1.60 i	Ahti Pajunen	Finland	03.12.1909	Vierumäki	06.02.2000
1.45	Ralph Maxwell	United States	26.11.19	Berea	29.07.2011
1.42	Vic Younger	Australia			04.05.2003
1.20	Kizo Kimura	Japan			08.08.2001

Note: Arling Pitcher (age 90) pole vaulted at the August 13–16, 1992 US Masters National Outdoor Championship. His height was 0.61 m (2 ft 0 in). The mark was never recognized as a record.
