= Masters M90 long jump world record progression =

This is the progression of world record improvements of the long jump M90 division of Masters athletics.

Key

Incomplete information Pending

Distance	Wind	Athlete	Nationality	Birthdate	Location	Date
3.26A		Donald Pellmann	United States	12.08.1915	Fort Collins	04.09.2005
3.15 i		Max Springer	United States	21.10.1913	Boston	27.03.2004
3.07		Vittorio Colo	Italy	09.11.1911	Milan	28.04.2002
3.0	1 0.4	Ralph Maxwell	United States	26.11.1919	Sacramento	22.07.2010
2.97		Kizo Kimura	Japan	11.07.1911	Saitama	2002
