= A. W. Mumford Stadium =

Stadium at Southern University in Louisiana, US

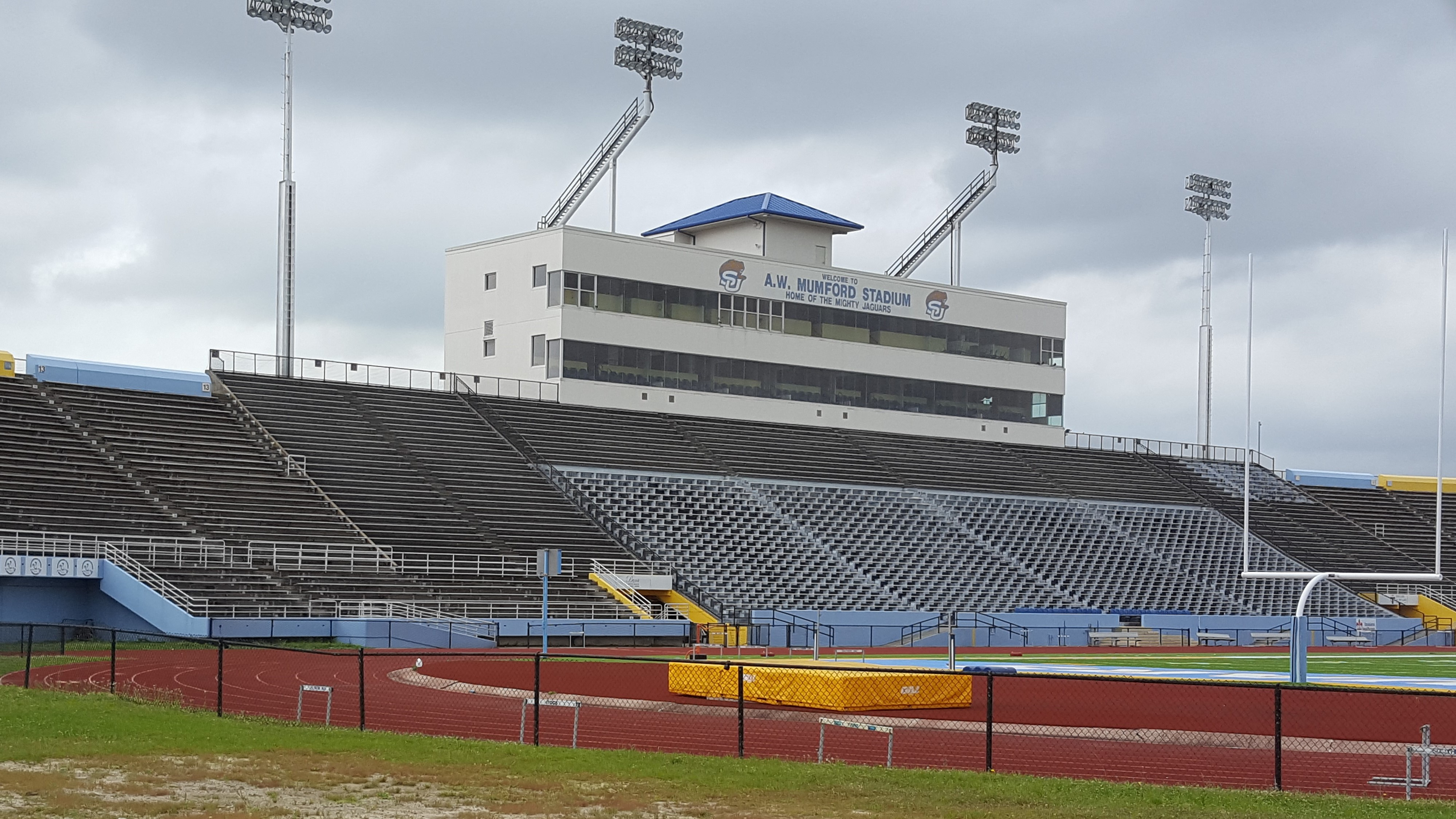
- Interactive map of A. W. Mumford Stadium
- Former names: University Stadium
- Location: Scotlandville, Baton Rouge, Louisiana
- Coordinates: 30.521862°N 91.189528°W
- Owner: Southern University
- Capacity: 25,500
- Surface: UBU Sports Intensity S5-M

Construction
- Opened: 1928

Tenants
- Southern Jaguars football (NCAA), 1928–present Southern Lady Jaguars soccer (NCAA); Southern Jaguars track and field (NCAA); Southern Lady Jaguars track and field (NCAA)

A. W. Mumford Stadium is a 28,500-seat multi-purpose stadium on the campus of Southern University in Scotlandville, Baton Rouge, Louisiana. It opened in 1928 and is home to the Southern Jaguars football and Southern University Laboratory School Kittens football teams, as well as the Southern women's soccer team. The Roscoe Moore Track located in the stadium is home to the men's and women's track and field teams.

The stadium is named after College Football Hall of Fame member, coach Arnett W. "Ace" Mumford, who coached the Jaguars from 1936–42 and 1944–61.

== History ==
Early Jaguar home football games were played on a field near the SU school of nursing, although Stanocola Park was also sometimes employed as a venue as well. Stanocola Park, after more than forty years of use, was replaced by the new City Park Field in 1933.

A contract for a permanent, on-campus stadium structure (with dormitory complex) was awarded by the state board of education on November 14, 1938. The new stadium was to be completed along the field's west sideline by creatively taking Works Progress Administration funds that were earmarked to build a student dormitory and then building the dorm in the shape of a grandstand—a technique that was possibly borrowed from Skipper Heard's 1931 expansion plans for Tiger Stadium at nearby Louisiana State University (the University of Tennessee similarly had dorm rooms incorporated into a Neyland Stadium expansion project around this time period as well).

By the 1939 season Mumford's football program was so successful that it had begun turning heads even within the local white community; as a sign of the changing times, Southern had begun advertising accommodations for white patrons on the new stadium grounds. When the stadium was completed in 1940, it included a 150-seat section for white patrons. One of the more noteworthy white fans was Ellis A. "Little Fuzzy" Brown who, along with his twin brother James ("Big Fuzzy"), coached Istrouma High School into the most successful dynasty in Louisiana's highest classification of prep football.

Wooden bleacher seats were added to the east side in the late 1950s, and an additional expansion was funded by the state in 1958. In the 1960s the dorm rooms were converted into the team's meeting and locker rooms.

Because SU's stadium could only hold 13,000 fans in the 1970s, Baton Rouge's Memorial Stadium—which could max out at 25,000—occasionally provided an alternative venue for prominent games. However, Memorial Stadium had to be used exclusively for home games while the on-campus stadium was being enlarged, beginning immediately after the 1977 home-opener. In 1982, with the expansion project finally complete, "University Stadium" was renamed after Mumford. 7,500 seats were added to boost capacity to 20,000—along with improved lighting that allowed for televised night games.

6,000 bleacher seats were added to the end zones before the 1992 home opener.

5,000 temporary bleacher seats were placed in the end zones in 1998. All 5,000 bleacher seats were then concentrated on the northern end zone side for the 1999 season, to go along with 1,000 new temporary bleacher seats that were also being installed there. The concrete grandstands along the sidelines held 24,000 seats.

A $6.75 million renovation was begun on A. W. Mumford Stadium's west side in 2000. The structure was waterproofed, concrete seating was replaced with aluminum bleachers, and the cramped, single-story press box was replaced with a two-story box that included two elevators, seven suites, and an increase to four restrooms from the original one. The east side of the stadium was then renovated before the 2001 season. However, the Jaguars still had to dress at the F. G. Clark Activity Center, and the opponents still had to dress at the Seymour Gym; meanwhile, the stadium's seating capacity stood at 24,000 seats.

In 2009, an extensive addition was completed behind the north end zone. 2,300 seats were added along with training rooms, weight rooms, conference rooms, coaches' offices, a student lounge, media rooms, memorabilia rooms, and eight luxury boxes.

In 2016, UBU Sports, Incorporated-produced synthetic field turf was installed.

In 2023, the stadium's light system was upgraded with LED lights to enhance the gameday experience and provide better energy efficient lighting. Southern University was gifted $1.265 million from Louisiana Public Commissioner Davante Lewis to complete the upgrades.

== Track and field ==
Every spring semester the stadium hosts the Pelican Relays. College and high school track teams compete at this event.

== Gallery ==
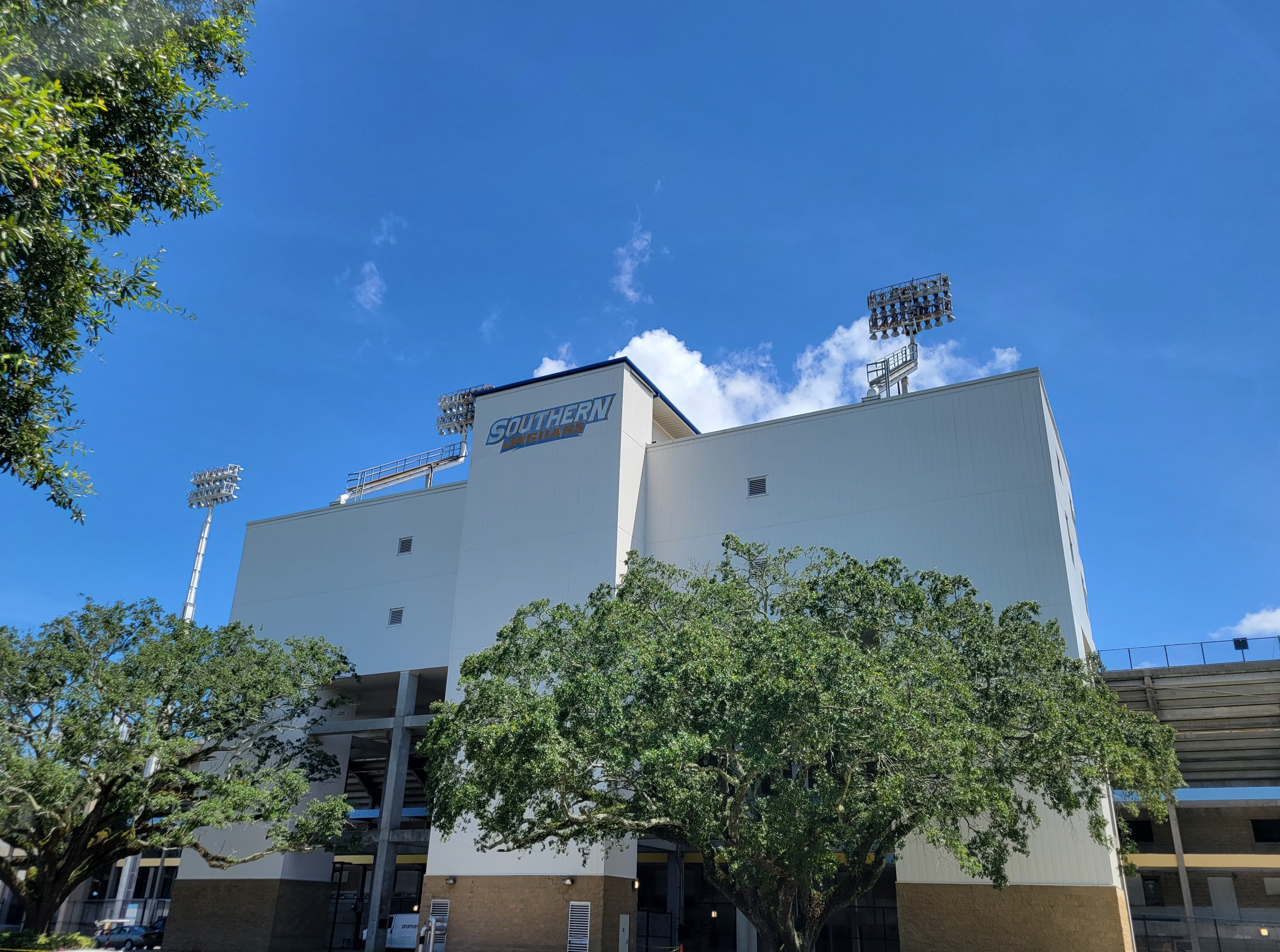
A. W. Mumford Stadium-Press Box and exterior

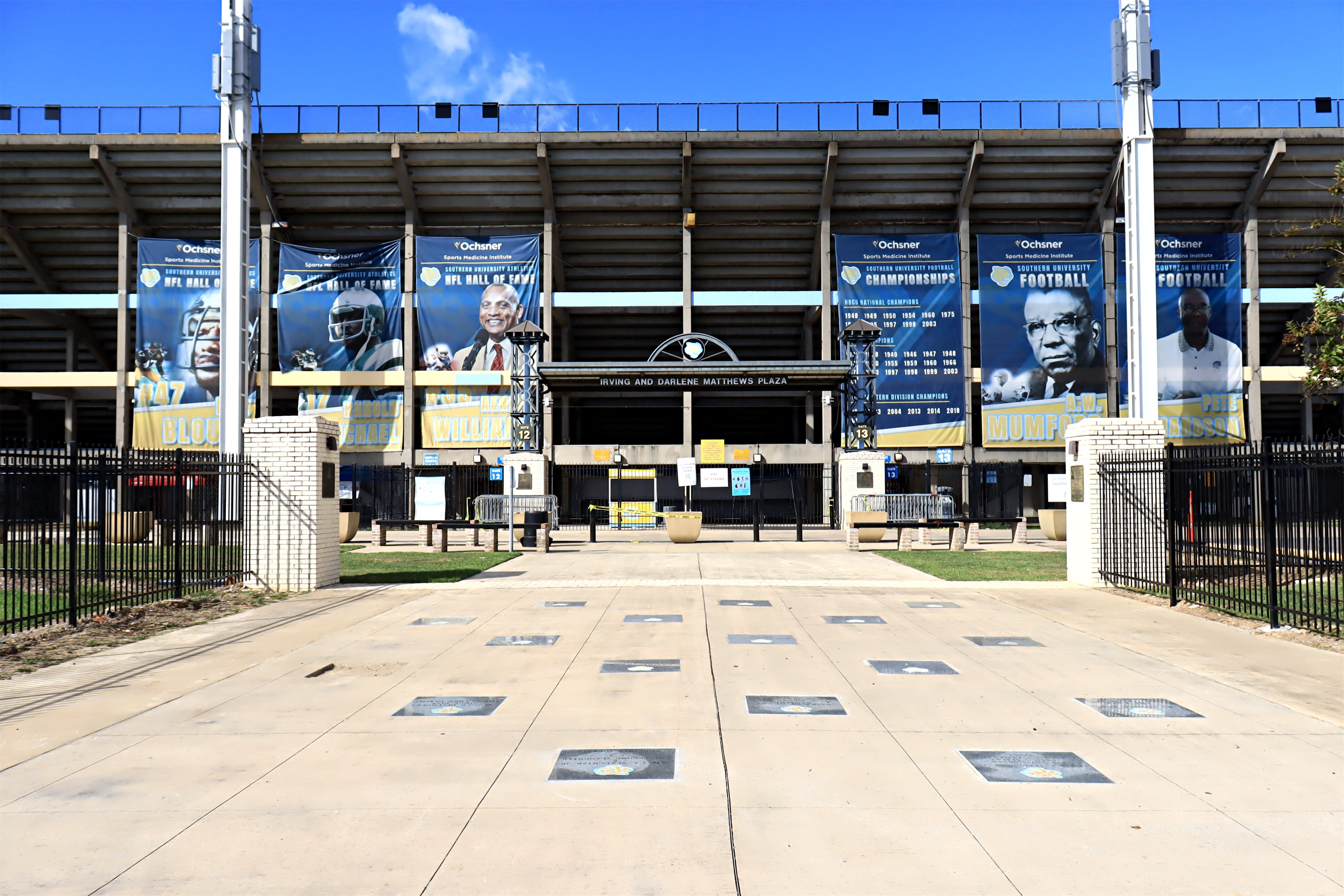
A. W. Mumford Stadium-exterior

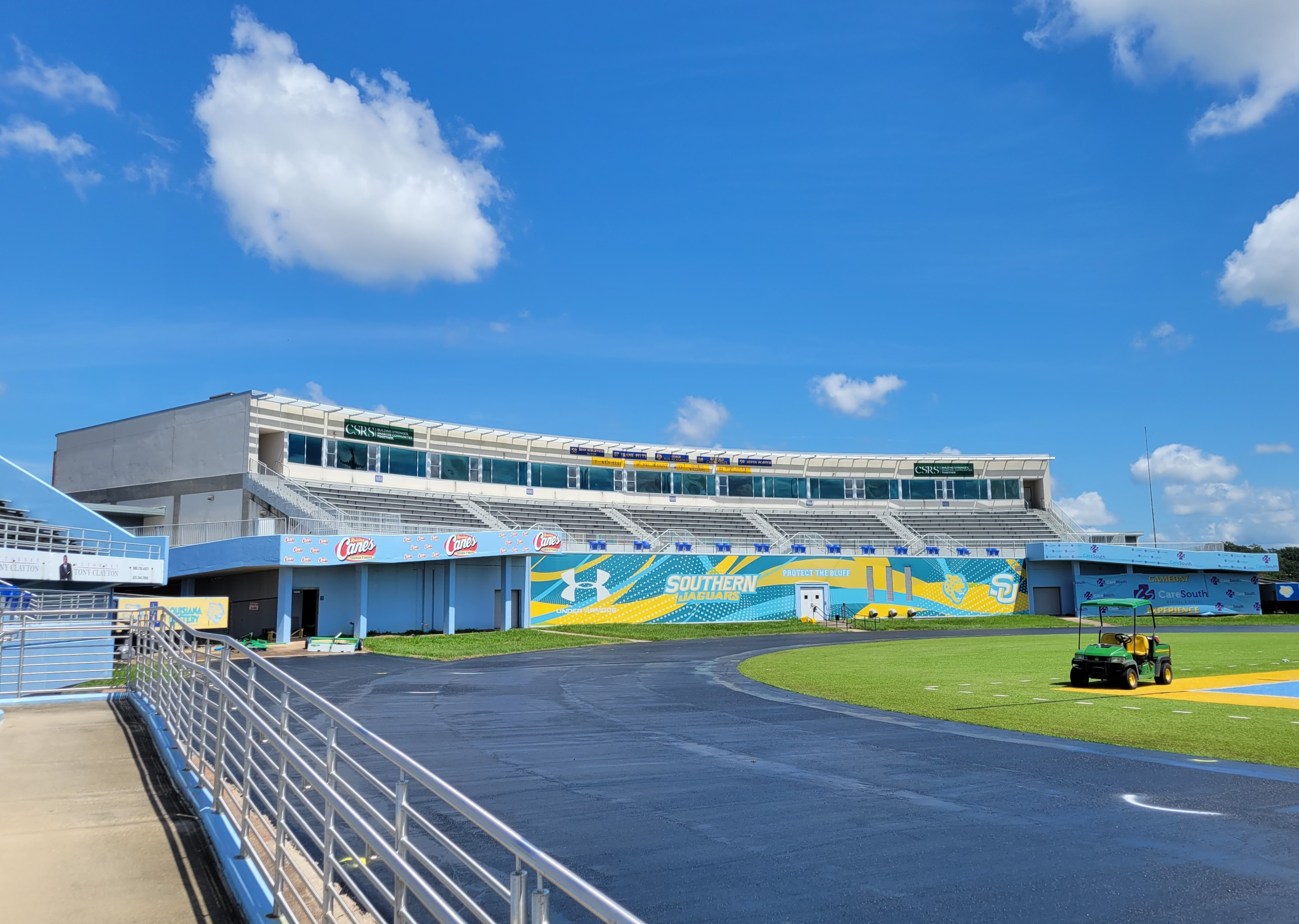
A. W. Mumford Stadium-Arnett W. Ace Mumford Fieldhouse seating

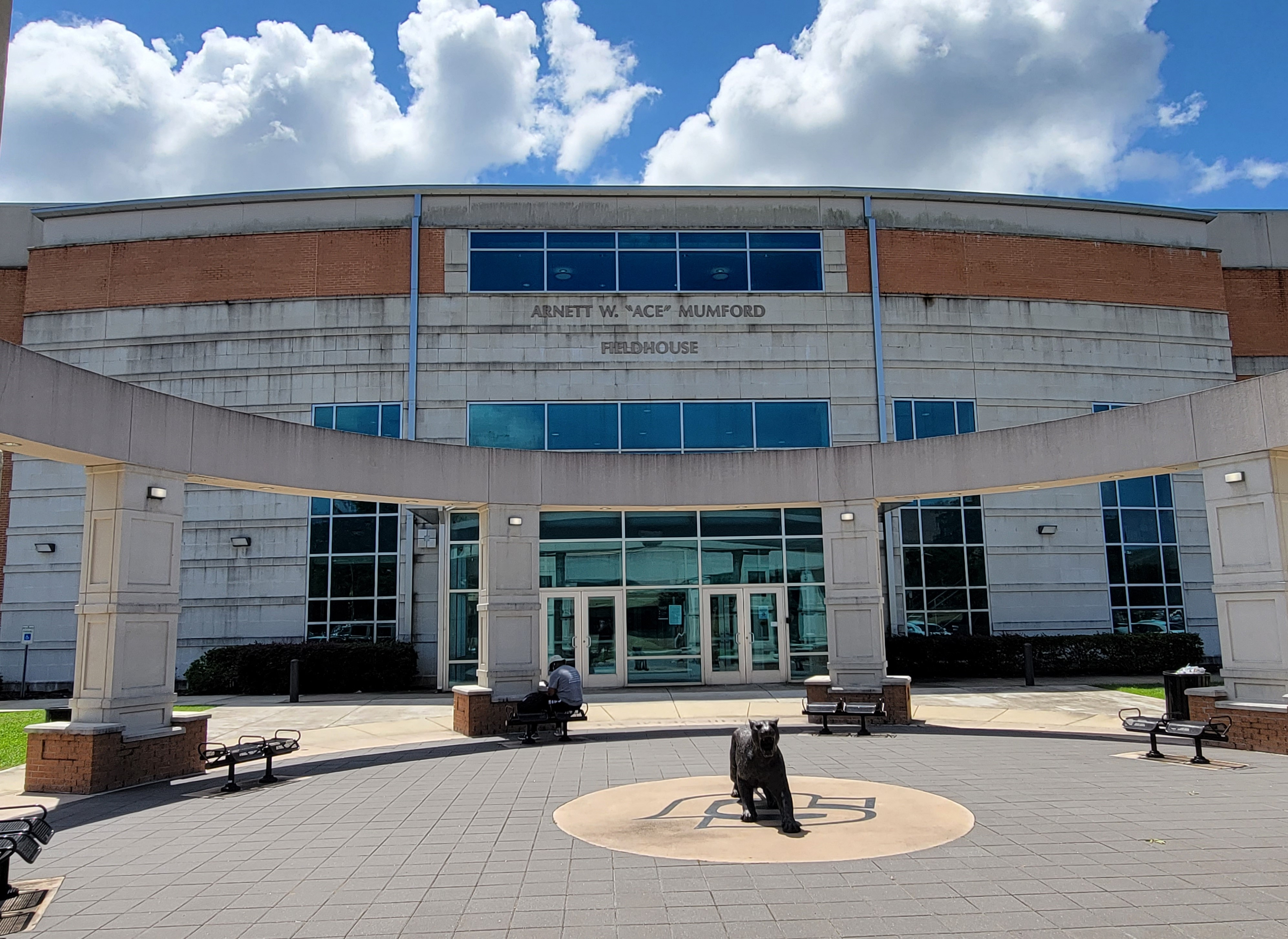
Arnett W. "Ace" Mumford Fieldhouse at A. W. Mumford Stadium

== See also ==
- List of NCAA Division I FCS football stadiums
