= Athletics at the 1904 Summer Olympics – Men's 200 metres hurdles =

Men's 200 metres hurdles at the Games of the III Olympiad
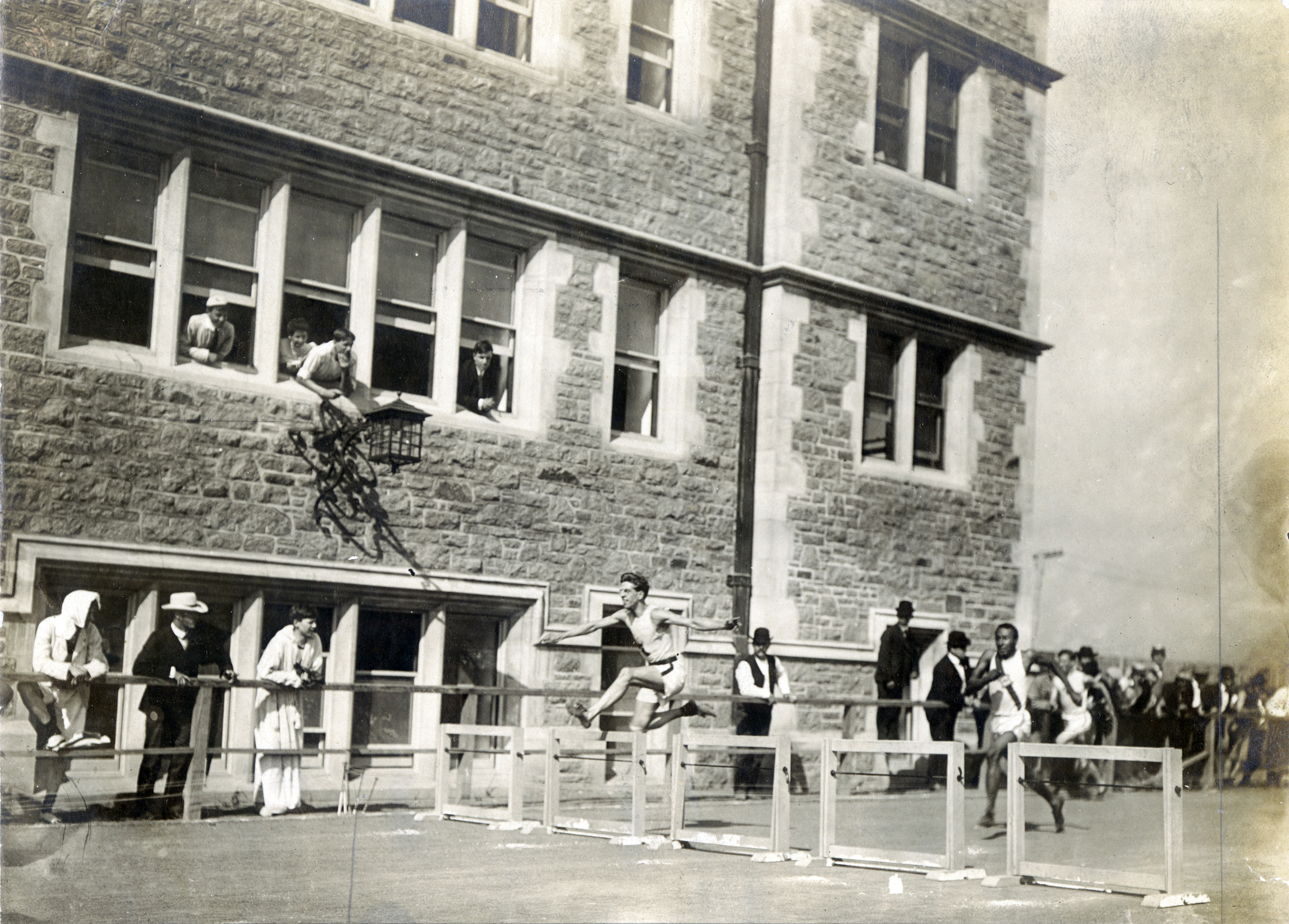
- Finish of the race
- Venue: Francis Field
- Date: September 1, 1904
- Competitors: 5 from 1 nation
- Winning time: 24.6 OR

Medalists
1st place, gold medalist(s)		Harry Hillman; United States
2nd place, silver medalist(s)		Frank Castleman; United States
3rd place, bronze medalist(s)		George Poage; United States

The men's 200 metres hurdles was a track and field athletics event held as part of the Athletics at the 1904 Summer Olympics programme. It was the second, and final, time the event was held. Five athletes from the United States participated. The competition was held on September 1, 1904. The event was won by Harry Hillman; Frank Castleman took silver and George Poage bronze.

== Background ==
This was the second and last time the event was held, with the previous time in 1900. None of the runners from the 1900 event returned. The three-time IC4A champion Edwin Clapp did not compete; 1902 AAU champion Harry Hillman did and was a "weak favorite" in the small field.

The United States made its second appearance.

== Competition format ==
The low hurdles competition consisted of a single race, with only five men competing.

== Records ==
These were the standing world and Olympic records (in seconds) prior to the 1904 Summer Olympics.

World record	Alvin Kraenzlein (USA)	23.8y (220 yds = 201.1 m)	New York City	28 May 1898
Olympic record	Alvin Kraenzlein (USA)	25.4	Paris, France	16 July 1900

Harry Hillman set a new Olympic record with 24.6 seconds. As the competition has been discontinued, his Olympic record still stands.

== Schedule ==
Date	Time	Round
Thursday, 1 September 1904		Final

== Results ==
Rank	Athlete	Nation	Time	Notes
1st place, gold medalist(s)	Harry Hillman	United States	24.6	OR
2nd place, silver medalist(s)	Frank Castleman	United States	24.9	
3rd place, bronze medalist(s)	George Poage	United States	Unknown	
4	George Varnell	United States	Unknown	
5	Fred Schule	United States	Unknown	
—	Edward Cairns	United States	DNS	
—	Edwin Clapp	United States	DNS	

== Sources ==
- Wudarski, Pawel (1999). "Wyniki Igrzysk Olimpijskich" (in Polish).
