= Masters M90 80 metres hurdles world record progression =

This is the progression of world record improvements of the 80 metres hurdles M90 division of Masters athletics.

Key

Incomplete information Wind aided Pending

Hand	Auto	Wind	Athlete	Nationality	Birthdate	Location	Date
	21.62	-1.5	Ralph Maxwell	United States	26.11.1919	Sacramento	06.07.2011
	21.74	-1.8	Ralph Maxwell	United States	26.11.1919	Sacramento	23.07.2010
	22.76	-1.1	Kizo Kimura	Japan	11.07.1911	Chiba	29.07.2001
