= Tynes Hildebrand =

American basketball coach (1931–2024)

Tynes Hildebrand, Sr.
Biographical details
- Born: February 25, 1931; Florien, Louisiana, U.S.
- Died: July 28, 2024 (aged 93); Flower Mound, Texas, U.S.
- Education: Northwestern State University

Playing career
- 1950–1954: Northwestern State

Coaching career (HC unless noted)
- 1957–1965: Natchitoches HS
- 1965–1980: Northwestern State

Administrative career (AD unless noted)
- 1983–1996: Northwestern State

Head coaching record
- Overall: 187–203

Accomplishments and honors

Awards
- 2× Gulf State Conference Coach of the Year (1966, 1975); Inductee of the NSU Sports Hall of Fame and the Louisiana Sports Hall of Fame

Tynes Hildebrand Sr. (February 25, 1931 – July 28, 2024) was an American basketball coach and athletic director. Hildebrand was the head basketball coach at Northwestern State University from 1965 to 1980, compiling an overall record of 187–203. He later served as athletic director for Northwestern State from 1983 to 1996. Hildebrand was elected to the Louisiana Sports Hall of Fame in 2014. Hildebrand died in Flower Mound, Texas on July 28, 2024, at the age of 93.

While a student at Northwestern State, Hildebrand lettered in basketball and track and field.

== Head coaching record ==
Record table
Season	Team	Overall	Conference	Standing	Postseason
Northwestern State Demons () (1965–1980)
1965–66	Northwestern State	18–7			
1966–67	Northwestern State	8–17			
1967–68	Northwestern State	12–13			
1968–69	Northwestern State	16–13			
1969–70	Northwestern State	13–13			
1970–71	Northwestern State	14–11			
1971–72	Northwestern State	11–14			
1972–73	Northwestern State	6–19			
1973–74	Northwestern State	21–9			
1974–75	Northwestern State	13–14			
1975–76	Northwestern State	14–10			
1976–77	Northwestern State	17–9			
1977–78	Northwestern State	12–15			
1978–79	Northwestern State	7–19			
1979–80	Northwestern State	5–20			
Northwestern State:		187–203 (.479)			
Total:		187–203 (.479)			
National champion Postseason invitational champion Conference regular season champion Conference regular season and conference tournament champion Division regular season champion Division regular season and conference tournament champion Conference tournament champion
