= John Petitbon =

American football player (1931–2006)

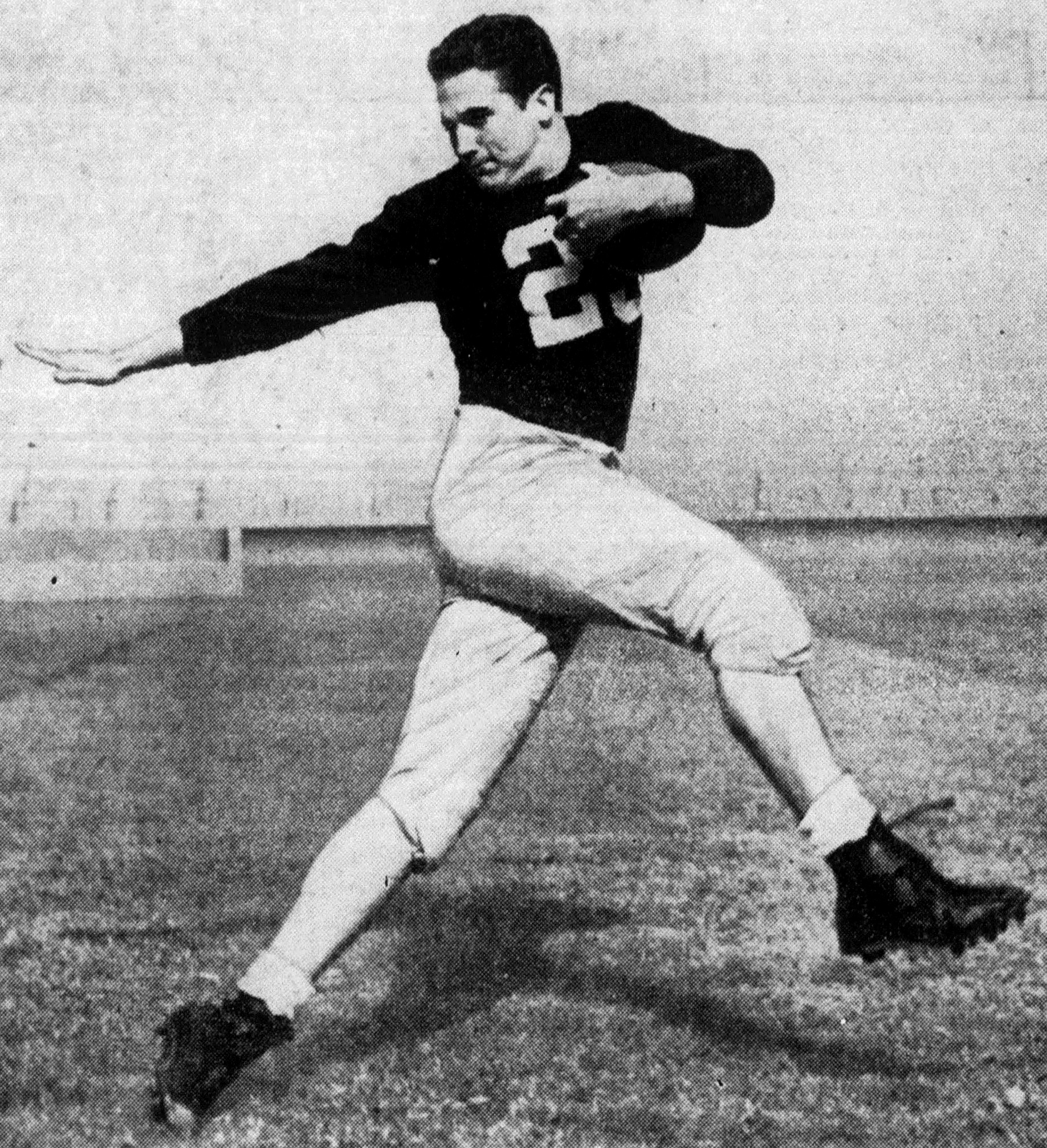
- Petitbon, circa 1951

No. 23, 44, 20
- Positions: Defensive back, halfback

Personal information
- Born: June 4, 1931; New Orleans, Louisiana, U.S.
- Died: November 11, 2006 (aged 75); New Orleans, Louisiana, U.S.
- Listed height: 5 ft 11 in (1.80 m)
- Listed weight: 186 lb (84 kg)

Career information
- High school: Jesuit (New Orleans)
- College: Notre Dame
- NFL draft: 1952: 7th round, 74th overall pick

Career history
- Dallas Texans (1952); Cleveland Browns (1955–1956); Green Bay Packers (1957)

Awards and highlights
- NFL champion (1955); National champion (1949); Louisiana Sports Hall of Fame

Career NFL statistics
- Interceptions: 8
- Fumble recoveries: 4
- Stats at Pro Football Reference

John Petitbon (June 4, 1931 – November 11, 2006) was an American professional football player.

A native of New Orleans, Louisiana, Petitbon was a three-sport star in baseball, basketball, and football at Jesuit High School. He was named the Louisiana All-State Most Valuable Player in football in 1946, and led Jesuit with 18 touchdowns in 1946 and 17 in 1947. He played college football at Notre Dame under coach Frank Leahy, and was a member of Notre Dame's 1949 national championship team as a sophomore safety. Moved to halfback for his final two years, he amassed 1,432 yards of total offense and 10 touchdowns during those seasons, and was named a Collier's Weekly All-American in 1950. He was chosen to play in the College All-Star Game and the East-West Shrine Game after his senior season in 1951.

Petitbon was selected 74th overall as a defensive back in the seventh round of the 1952 NFL draft by the New York Yanks, who became the Dallas Texans for the 1952 season. Petitbon, however, joined the United States Marine Corps and served in the Korean War. Before the 1953 season, the Texans, who had become the Baltimore Colts, traded him to the Cleveland Browns as part of a 15-player deal, the second-largest trade in NFL history, in which the Colts received, among other players, defensive back Don Shula. After returning from the Marines, Petitbon played for the Browns and was a member of their 1955 NFL championship team. Petitbon was traded to the Green Bay Packers in 1957 and retired after that season.

Petitbon was selected for the Louisiana Sports Hall of Fame and the Louisiana High School Sports Hall of Fame, as was his younger brother Richie Petitbon, a former NFL player and coach.

After leaving football, John Petitbon entered the insurance business. He died of Alzheimer's disease in New Orleans on November 11, 2006.
