= Atha (disambiguation) =

Atha is a genus of moth.

Atha may also refer to:

== People ==
- Bernard Atha (1928–2022), Lord Mayor of Leeds, England, and occasional film actor
- Bob Atha (1960–2026), American footballer
- Dick Atha (1931–2020), American basketball player
- Michael Wayne Atha (born 1979), American rapper known as Yelawolf
- Rob Atha (born 1986), English table football player
- Stuart Atha (born 1962), Air Marshall in Royal Air Force

== Other ==
- Atha (MV), see Boats of the Mackenzie River watershed
- Korravai also known as Atha, a form of the Hindu goddess Durga

== See also ==
- Athas (disambiguation)
