= George Poage =

American hurdler and sprinter

George Coleman Poage
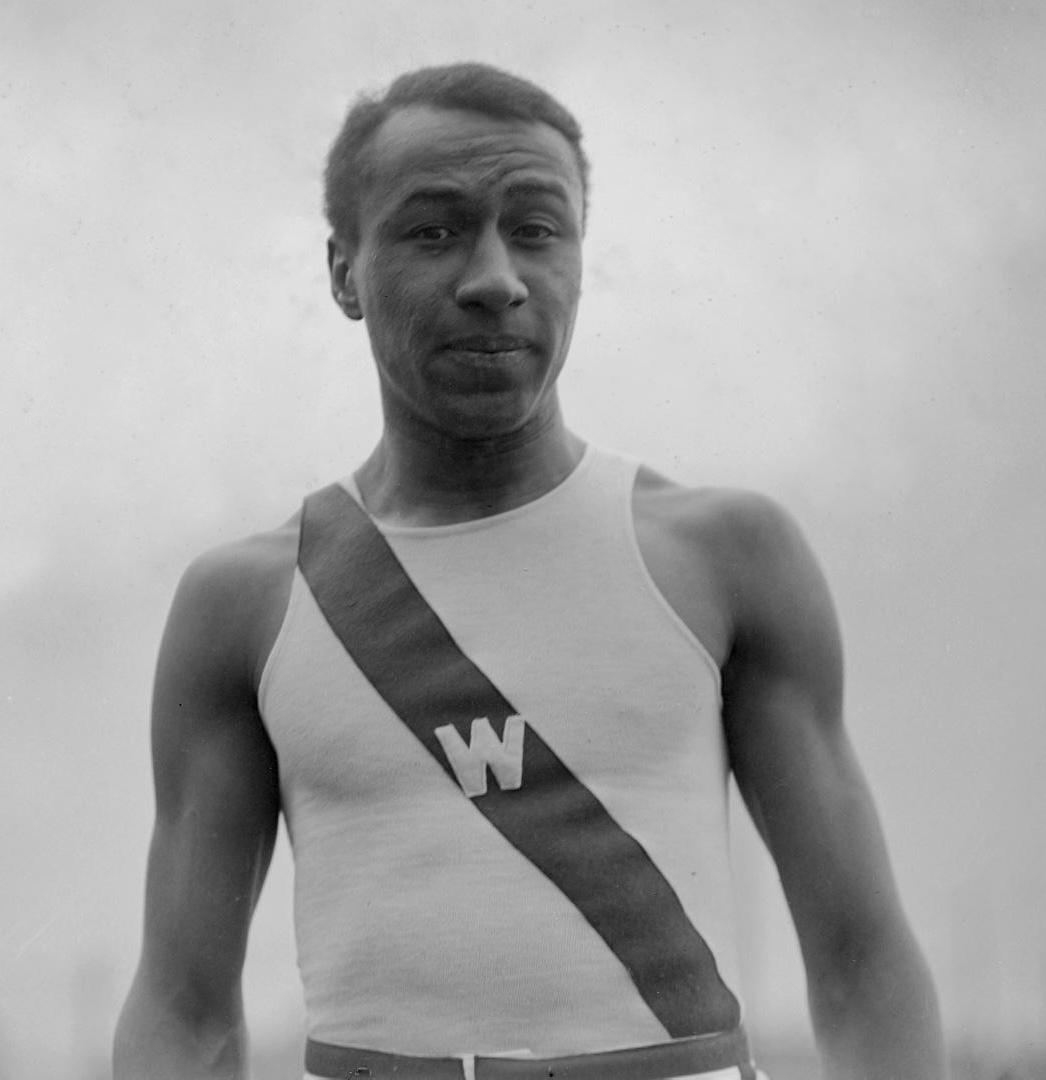
- Poage in 1904
- Born: George Coleman Poage; November 6, 1880; Hannibal, Missouri, U.S.
- Died: April 11, 1962 (aged 81); Chicago, Illinois, U.S.
- Education: University of Wisconsin - Madison (BA)
- Occupation: American Olympic Athlete
- Years active: 1895-1904

George Poage
Medal record

Men's athletics

Representing the United States

Olympic Games
Bronze medal – third place	1904 St. Louis	200 metre hurdles
Bronze medal – third place	1904 St. Louis	400 metre hurdles

George Coleman Poage (November 6, 1880 – April 11, 1962) was an American track and field athlete. He was the first black and the first African-American athlete to win a medal in the Olympic Games, winning two bronze medals at the 1904 games in St. Louis.

== Biography ==
=== Early life ===
Born in Hannibal, Missouri, his family moved to La Crosse, Wisconsin in 1884. After his father, James, died in 1888, George Poage, along with his mother and surviving sibling, moved into the home of Mary and Lucian Easton; Lucian was the son of local lumberman Jason Easton, who employed James in his stables.

At La Crosse High School Poage excelled as both a student and an athlete; he was considered the top athlete at the school and, in 1899, was the class salutatorian, becoming the school's third African-American graduate, after Florence Birney in 1887, and George's sister, Nellie in 1897.

=== College and Olympic years ===
The following fall he became a freshman at the University of Wisconsin. After competing with the freshman track squad in 1900, he joined the varsity track and field team during his sophomore year. Poage was the first black athlete to run for UW, specializing in the short sprints and hurdles. A consistent point winner for his team, he quickly became well respected. When the track coach was called out of town in 1902, he placed Poage in charge of the team in his absence.

Poage graduated in 1903 with a degree in History. His senior thesis was titled "An Investigation into the Economic Condition of the Negro in the State of Georgia During the Period of 1860–1900". He returned to the University for the 1903–04 school year to take graduate classes in History, supported by the UW athletic department, which hired him as an athletic trainer for the football team. In June 1904, he became the first African-American individual Big Ten track champion in conference history, placing first in both the 440-yard dash and the 220-yard hurdles.

The Milwaukee Athletic Club sponsored Poage to compete in the 1904 Summer Olympics in St. Louis, Missouri. Many prominent African-American leaders had called for a boycott of the games to protest racial segregation of the events in St. Louis. An integrated audience was not allowed at either the Olympics or the World's Fair as the organizers had built segregated facilities for the spectators. Poage chose to compete in four events and became the first black and the first African-American to medal in the Games by winning the bronze in both the 200-yard and 400-yard hurdles.

=== Later years ===
Poage remained in St. Louis after the Olympics, working as a school principal for a year before becoming a teacher at segregated Charles Sumner High School. At Sumner, he was the head of the English department, teaching English composition, literature, and Latin, helped coach the school’s sports teams, and supervised various extracurricular activities such as debate and theater. In 1914, Poage left his job at Sumner. According to a former student, he purchased a farm in Minnesota, although no land records of the purchase have been found. Local historian Margaret Lichter and Bruce Mouser have speculated that the land was owned by the Easton family.

In 1920, Poage moved to Chicago. He worked in a restaurant for four years.

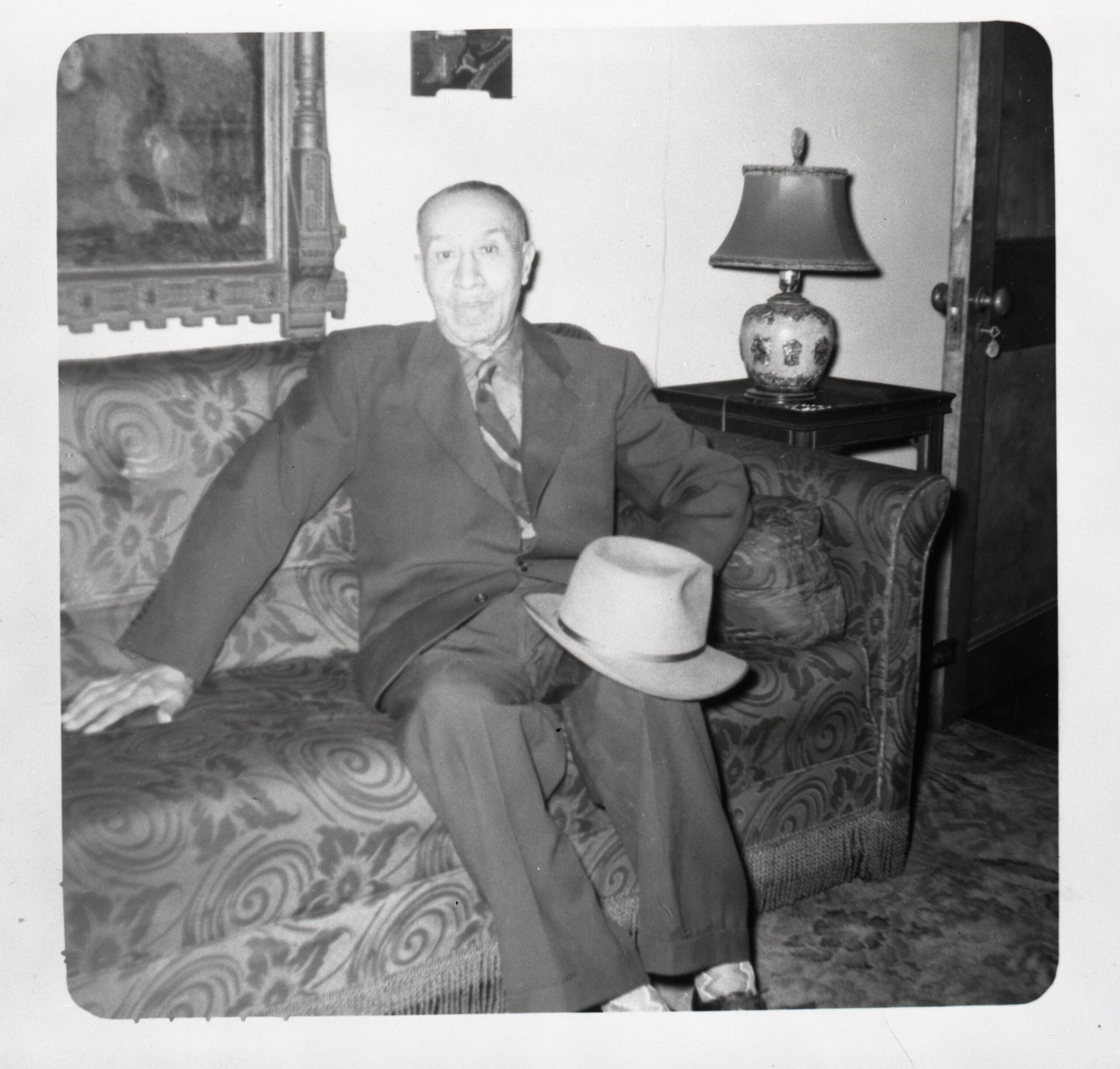
George C. Poage circa 1950’s

After moving to Chicago in 1920, George C. Poage lived most of his later adult life in relative anonymity. Very little public information is available of Poage after 1920, including very few photographs.

In 1924, Poage was hired by the United States Postal Service and worked as a postal clerk for nearly thirty years. After his retirement in the 1950s, he remained in Chicago until his death in 1962.

== Personal life ==
Poage never married and never had children.

Decades after his death in 1962, a relative revealed that Poage was homosexual.

== Legacy ==
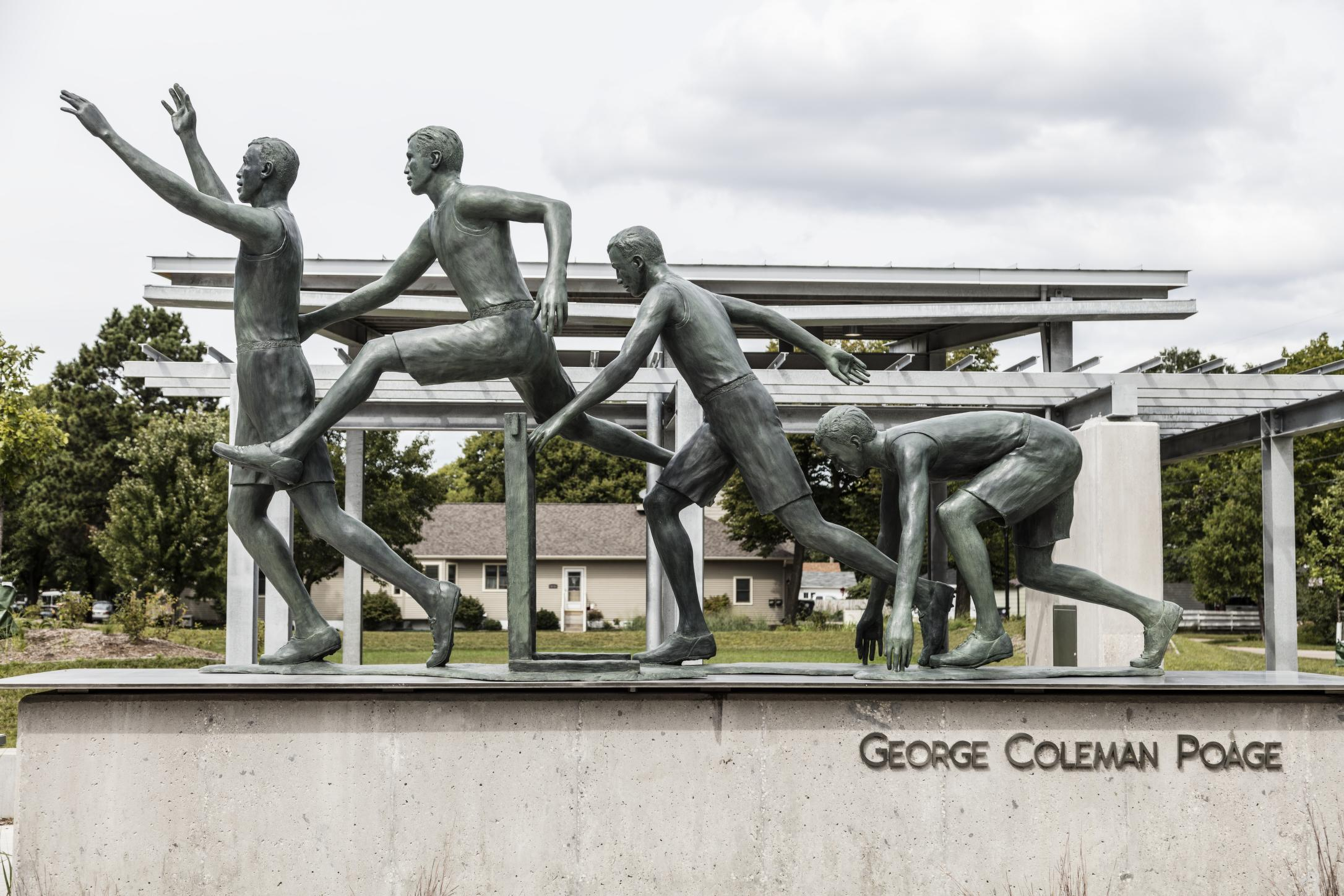
Statue of George C. Poage at Poage Park - La Crosse, WI - 2016

Poage was elected to the Wisconsin Athletic Hall of Fame in 1998.

In 2013, the La Crosse City Council renamed Hood Park to George C. Poage Park in Poage's honor.

In 2016, a cast-bronze statue of Poage was erected in Poage Park, La Crosse, Wisconsin.

In 2023, Poage was honored with a community dinner and presentation of a PBS documentary Poage was featured in, entitled Wisconsin Pride. The event took place at Poage Park in La Crosse. The documentary Wisconsin Pride was produced by PBS Wisconsin and aired on Wisconsin Public Television throughout the state of Wisconsin’s PBS network.
