= 200 metres hurdles =

Sports discipline

Athletics 200 metres hurdles

World records
- Men: (Brazil) Alison dos Santos 21.85 (2025)
- Women: (Italy) Yadisleidy Pedroso 24.8 (2013)

Olympic records
- Men: (United States) Harry Hillman 24.6 (1904)

The 200 metres hurdles is a rarely run hurdling event in track and field competitions. Sometimes, this event is referred to as the low hurdles. It was run twice in the Summer Olympics, in 1900 and 1904.

== All-time top 25 ==
- straight = performance on straight track
- y = 220 yard course
- h = hand timing
- A = affected by altitude

=== Men ===
- Correct as of May 2025.

Rank	Time	Type	Wind	Athlete	Nationality	Date	Place	Ref.
1	21.85	straight	(+1.5 m/s)	Alison dos Santos	Brazil	17 May 2025	Atlanta	
2	21.9y h	straight	+1.4	Don Styron	United States	2 April 1960	Baton Rouge	
3	22.10	straight	+2.0	Andy Turner	Great Britain	15 May 2011	Manchester	
3	22.10	straight	+1.8	L. J. van Zyl	South Africa	9 May 2015	Manchester	
5	22.1y h	straight	NWI	Elias Gilbert	United States	17 May 1958	Raleigh	
6	22.18	straight	-0.6	Amere Lattin	United States	23 May 2021	Boston	
7	22.2y h	straight	+1.4	David Sime	United States	5 May 1956	Durham, NC	
7	22.2y h	straight	+1.3	Ancel Robinson	United States	15 June 1957	Austin	
7	22.2y h	straight	NWI	Calvin Cooley	United States	16 April 1960	Abilene	
10	22.26	straight	+2.0	Bershawn Jackson	United States	15 May 2011	Manchester	
11	22.3y h A	straight	NWI	Harrison Dillard	United States	21 June 1947	Salt Lake City	
11	22.3y h	straight	NWI	Fran Washington	United States	17 May 1958	Raleigh	
11	22.3y h	straight	NWI	Dick Howard	United States	16 April 1960	Abilene	
11	22.3y h	straight	NWI	Irvin Roberson	United States	27 May 1961	Modesto	
11	22.30	straight	(+1.5 m/s)	Caleb Dean	United States	17 May 2025	Atlanta	
16	22.4y h	straight	NWI	Ralph Boston	United States	28 May 1960	Fort Campbell	
17	22.48	straight	NWI	Johnny Dutch	United States	26 May 2017	Manchester	
18	22.5y h	straight	NWI	Fred Wolcott	United States	8 June 1940	Princeton	
18	22.5y h	straight	NWI	William Porter	United States	21 June 1947	Salt Lake City	
18	22.5y h	straight	NWI	Craig Dixon	United States	9 April 1949	Los Angeles	
18	22.5y h	straight	NWI	Rod Perry	United States	14 June 1957	Austin	
18	22.5y h	straight	NWI	Hayes Jones	United States	30 May 1959	Austin	
18	22.5y h	straight	NWI	Rex Stucker	United States	21 May 1960	Ames	
18	22.5y h	straight	NWI	Rex Cawley	United States	15 April 1961	Tempe	
18	22.5y h	straight	NWI	John Bethea	United States	3 June 1962	Baltimore	
18	22.5 h	bend	+1.2	Martin Lauer	West Germany	7 July 1959	Zürich	

==== Notes ====
Below is a list of other times equal or superior to 22.50:

- Don Styron also ran 22.1 h (1960, 1961), 22.2 h (1960, 1961), 22.3 h (1960, 1961).
- Alison dos Santos also ran 22.12 (−0.6 m/s) (Note: by official result source, 22.11 by World Athletics source)
- Andy Turner also ran 22.30 (2010).
- Ancel Robinson also ran 22.3 h (1957).

=== Women ===
- Correct as of September 2021.

Rank	Time	Type	Wind	Athlete	Nationality	Date	Place	Ref.
1	24.8 h	bend	+0.4	Yadisleidy Pedroso	Italy	6 April 2013	Caserta	
2	24.86	straight	+0.1	Shiann Salmon	Jamaica	23 May 2021	Boston	
3	24.91	straight	+0.1	Shamier Little	United States	23 May 2021	Boston	
4	25.05	straight	+1.0	Meghan Beesley	Great Britain	17 May 2014	Manchester	
5	25.31	straight	+0.5	Katarina Johnson-Thompson	Great Britain	9 May 2015	Manchester	
6	25.6 h	bend	–0.7	Patricia Girard	France	23 August 2001	Nantes	
7	25.7 h	bend	–1.5	Pam Kilborn-Ryan	Australia	25 November 1971	Melbourne	
8	25.71	straight	+0.1	Rhonda Whyte	Jamaica	23 May 2021	Boston	
9	25.74	straight	–1.1	Perri Shakes-Drayton	Great Britain	25 May 2013	Manchester	
10	25.79	bend	+0.5	Noemi Zbären	Switzerland	17 May 2014	Basel	
10	25.79	bend	–0.6	Lauren Wells	Australia	21 January 2017	Canberra	
12	25.8 h	bend	+0.6	Annelie Jahns-Erdhardt	East Germany	5 July 1970	Erfurt	
12	25.8 h	bend	–0.9	Teresa Sukniewicz	Poland	9 August 1970	Warsaw	
12	25.80	straight	+0.6	Ebony Morrison	United States	20 May 2018	Boston	
15	25.81	bend	–1.5	Zuzana Hejnová	Czech Republic	13 September 2017	Kutné Hoře	
16	25.84	straight	+1.0	Eilidh Child	Great Britain	17 May 2014	Manchester	
17	25.86	straight	+1.0	Denisa Rosolová	Czech Republic	17 May 2014	Manchester	
18	25.9 h	bend	NWI	Valeria Bufanu	Romania	21 October 1970	Bucharest	
18	25.90	straight	+1.0	Dalilah Muhammad	United States	17 May 2014	Manchester	
20	26.0 h	bend	NWI	Danuta Sraszynska	Poland	9 August 1970	Warsaw	
21	26.1 h	bend	NWI	Pat Hawkins	United States	10 July 1971	Bakersfield	
22	26.11	bend	–0.9	Line Kloster	Norway	11 June 2020	Oslo	
23	26.12	straight	–0.2	Gianna Woodruff	Panama	4 June 2017	Boston	
23	26.12	straight	+0.3	Cassandra Tate	United States	16 June 2019	Boston	
25	26.16	straight	+0.3	Zeney van der Walt	South Africa	16 June 2019	Boston	

==== Notes ====
Below is a list of other times equal or superior to 26.16:

- Meghan Beesley also ran 25.28 (2015).
- Pam Kilborn-Ryan also ran hand-timed 25.8 (1969), 25.9 (1971), 26.0 (1969) and 26.1 (1969).
- Patricia Girard also ran 25.82 (1999), hand-timed 26.1 (1998) and 26.11 (1998).
- Ebony Morrison also ran 25.83 straight (2021).
- Shamier Little also ran 25.88 straight (2019), 25.90 straight (2018) and 26.00 straight (2017).
- Yadisleidy Pedroso also ran hand-timed 25.7 (2012) and 26.06 (2015).
- Rhonda Whyte also ran 26.05 straight (2019).
- Valeria Bufanu also ran a hand-timed 26.1 (1970).
- Teresa Sukniewicz also ran a hand-timed 26.1 (1970).
- Cassandra Tate also ran 26.15 straight (2018).

== Masters athletics ==
The event is the official distance for the M80+ and W70+ divisions of Masters athletics. The height for all hurdles in these age groups is 27 in (69 cm), and the arrangement of the hurdles is different from the previous version of the race. The distance to the first hurdle is 20 metres, which corresponds with the markings for the last half of a 400 metres hurdle race, standard on most tracks. Because, like the flat 200 metres, the race only covers half of a standard track, a wind reading is required.

=== 27-inch hurdles ===
The idea of using 27 in (69 cm) hurdles was introduced in Europe in 2000. Standard hurdles do not accommodate this height, which caused resistance from some NGBs, but the rules were adopted worldwide. Many hurdles will not go to that height at all, or would only do so if they were cut down. Most facilities that have spent thousands of dollars to buy regulation hurdles would not allow them to be damaged by cutting. Since it is a requirement, major championship meets have purchased a few sets of modified hurdles, and ship these few hurdles between meets. As a substitute, many older hurdle designs are easier to modify, and most facilities are less protective of old equipment. Also many training hurdles (used to teach smaller, youth beginners) will go to 27 inches and lower.

=== Records ===
After setting the world record for the 300 metres hurdles during its last year on the official program at age 80, Canadian Earl Fee set the still standing world record of 36.95 (+0.0) a year later at the NCCWMA Regional Championships in Mayaguez, Puerto Rico on September 5, 2010. Almost four years later, Fee also set the M85 record of 42.70 (+0.4) in the same meet, this time being held in San Jose, Costa Rica on August 23, 2014. The M90 record of 51.31 was set a month earlier by American Ralph Maxwell with the benefit of high altitude in Fort Collins, Colorado, USA at the Rocky Mountain Masters Games.

Australian Marge Allison holds the W70 record of 36.71 (+0.7), set August 12, 2015 in Lyon, France, at the 2015 World Masters Athletics Championships. Allison also holds the W65 record set four years earlier at the same championships. Canadian Christa Bortignon set the W75 record of 39.89 (+0.0) at a domestic meet in Kamloops, British Columbia on May 18, 2013. American sprinting legend Irene Obera learned hurdles sufficiently to set the W80 record 42.24 (+1.2) on July 20, 2014, at the USATF Masters Championships in Winston-Salem, North Carolina.
