= Low hurdles =

Track and field event

Low hurdle races are a generally defunct form of track and field hurdle racing. The event, generally run at or near a distance of 200 metres, was popular through 1960 at the international level. The races were frequently run on a straightaway, necessitating a track with a long "chute", also known a panhandle track. Since its hurdles were lower, this race was much faster and less technical than the 110 metres hurdles,

== Background ==
The event, generally run at or near a distance of 200 metres, was popular through 1960 at the international level. After that, the IAAF stopped ratifying records in the 200 metres low hurdles and it became far less common.

United States high schools ran a shortened version of the race, the 180 yard low hurdles, until 1974, when most states and the NFHS switched to running the 330 yard low hurdles that with metrification evolved into the 300 meter intermediate hurdles, a shortened version of the international 400 metres hurdles.

Because the 200 metres low hurdles race was mostly run during a male-dominated era, women had no common equivalent of the race. At the time, the race lost its world record position, women were only occasionally running hurdles; when they did, it was a distance of 80 meters, using barriers the same height as the men's low hurdles.

== Characteristics ==
The height of the low hurdles was 30 in (76.2 cm), the same height now used in women's long hurdles, which is generally a 400-metre race. The races were frequently run on a straightaway, necessitating a track with a long "chute" (a straight extension to one of the straight sides of the track), which accommodated the 200 metres straight and the single-turn 400 metres or 440 yards flat races in addition to the hurdles. These tracks have been referred to as "panhandle tracks". In large stadiums where seating for football games was a primary consideration, the starting line for such races was inside a tunnel under the seats.

Since its hurdles were lower, this race was much faster and less technical than the 110 metres hurdles, in which the hurdles were 12 in (30.5 cm) higher. Sprinters were able to change over to the low hurdles with success.

== World records ==
Jesse Owens set world records in both the 200 meters and the 220 yard low hurdles in 1935, during his day of multiple world records that was called the most impressive athletic achievement since 1850.

The last official world record holder in the men's low hurdles was Don Styron from Northeast Louisiana State University, whose hand-timed mark of 21.9 seconds was set on April 2, 1960, in a dual meet against Louisiana State University. The mark has lasted ever since.

Modern races use fully automatic timing (FAT). The fastest FAT time recorded is 22.30 s (with a wind of -0.6 m/s) set on May 16, 2010 by Andy Turner at the Manchester City Games in a specially arranged race, but after applying the standard conversion between FAT and hand-timed races, Styron's mark is still superior.

Turner beat a time of 22.55 s set by Olympian Laurent Ottoz of Italy in 1995. Ottoz had bettered the automatic time of 22.63 by British Olympic medalist and multi-time World Champion Colin Jackson, who held the world record in the much more common 110 metre hurdles for almost 13 years.

The IAAF currently recognizes three records in this event:

- Styron as a hand-timed mark on a straight;
- Turner as an automatically-timed mark on a straight; and
- Ottoz as an automatically-timed mark around a bend.

== US secondary school competition ==
=== Boys ===
The US high school record in the 180 yard low hurdles dates to 1964 when three boys, Earl McCullouch from Long Beach Polytechnic High School, Don Castronovo from Oceanside High School in Oceanside, New York and Steve Caminiti from Crespi Carmelite High School in Encino, California separately ran times of 18.1. Their record had not been broken when regular US high school competitions discontinued the event in 1974.

=== Girls hurdles ===
Note: The low hurdles (on the turn) were contested at the US girls high school level, in the state of Illinois until 1985. The following are likely the fastest times recorded.

1984–85 Nicolle Thompson - East St. Louis (Lincoln) - :27.0

1983–84 Sametra King - Romeoville (H.S.) - :27.3

1981–82 Chris Crowther - Joliet (West) - :27.7

1980–81 Loretta Wiltgen - Country Club Hills (Hillcrest) - :27.9

1979–80 Gwen Brown - East St. Louis (Lincoln) - :28.0

== Current ==
Though no longer run in the United States, this race continues to be run in places such as Norway.
