= Panhandle track =

Panhandle track (or pot handle track) is a slang expression for a running track built with a 220-yard straightaway. The name came from the resemblance of the shape of a pan (the track oval) with a long handle.

Tracks meeting this specification were popular in the era of cinder tracks, from the early 20th century until about the mid-1960s. In 1962, the IAAF determined that it would no longer recognize records at 400 meters or longer without the course requiring the athlete to complete an oval every 400 metres.

The long straightaway had allowed for one-turn 400 metres or 440 yard competitions; three-turn 800 metres or 880 yard competitions; straight 200 metres or 220 yard sprint or low hurdles competitions.

A typical one-turn 440 yard dash would start as a scratch start (no lanes) at the end of the straight with the athletes sprinting for the lead before entering the turn, making the race a much more physical and strategic affair, similar to modern 800 metres races.

While new tracks meeting this specification are no longer being constructed, many older tracks still have remnants of the long straightaway, frequently now put to other uses. Occasionally modern all-weather running tracks have extended the surface to the full length of the original straight.
