= George M. Varnell =

American hurdler (1882–1967)

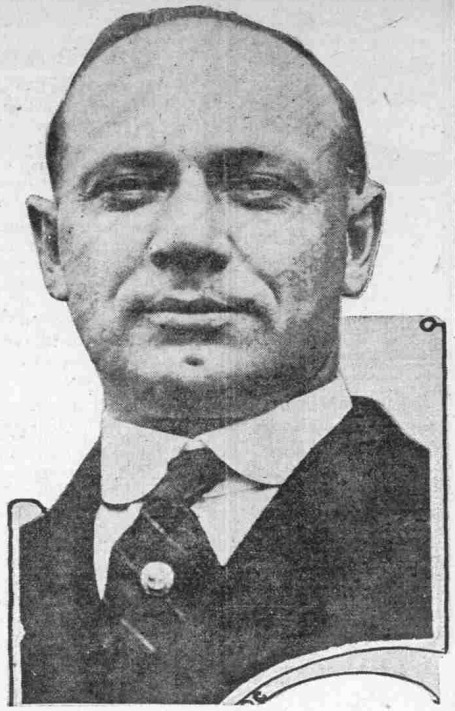
- Varnell, c. 1919

Biographical details
- Born: August 10, 1882; Chicago, Illinois, U.S.
- Died: February 4, 1967 (aged 84); Seattle, Washington, U.S.

Playing career

Football
- 1904: Chicago
- 1905: Kentucky University
- Position: Halfback

Coaching career (HC unless noted)

Football
- 1907–1911: Gonzaga

Basketball
- 1907–1909: Gonzaga

George Marshall Varnell (August 10, 1882 – February 4, 1967) was an American track and field athlete, Gonzaga University's first basketball coach, a college football player, coach, and official, who refereed a record-setting eight Rose Bowl games, and sports editor of two major Pacific Northwest newspapers. He competed in the 1904 Summer Olympics, finishing fourth in the 200 meter hurdles event as well as fourth in the 400 meter hurdles competition. Varnell served as the referee during the 1920 Rose Bowl between Oregon and Harvard, as well as at seven other Rose Bowl games.

Varnell was born in Chicago. He played football for coach Amos Alonzo Stagg at the University of Chicago in 1904 and also at Kentucky University—now known as Transylvania University—in 1904. Varnell joined the staff of the Spokane Daily Chronicle in 1908, and later became sports editor for the newspaper. In Spokane, he helped create Gonzaga College's basketball program, and coached the team for two seasons. He also helped resurrect football at the school. He moved to Seattle, in 1925, where he was a sports editor and associate editor for The Seattle Times until his retirement in 1966. During his time in Seattle, Varnell was extremely supportive of Washington Huskies rowing and covered their squad for decades, including the 1936 team that won a gold medal in the Olympics in Germany. Varnell died on February 4, 1967, at a hospital in Seattle, following an illness lasting 18 months.
