= Street meet =

Athletics competition held on streets

A street meet is a type of athletics or track and field competition in which sprint or field events are held on a street, rather than in a track and field stadium as is usual.

Street meets are becoming an increasingly popular way to attract new fans to track and field.

IAAF president Sebastian Coe suggested an official "street athletics circuit" in his manifesto, saying "We need to be more innovative in how we project and present our sport to the world, both in venue and on screen, and we need to give serious consideration to an IAAF Street Athletics circuit to help reach new audiences."

== Notable street meets ==
- Victor Street Athletics Meet in Victor Harbor, South Africa
- Great CityGames Manchester in Manchester, United Kingdom
- Adidas Boost Boston Games in Boston, Massachusetts
- Drake Relays "Mall Vault" in Des Moines, Iowa
- Puma Street Meet in Boston, Massachusetts
