= Louisiana Sports Hall of Fame =

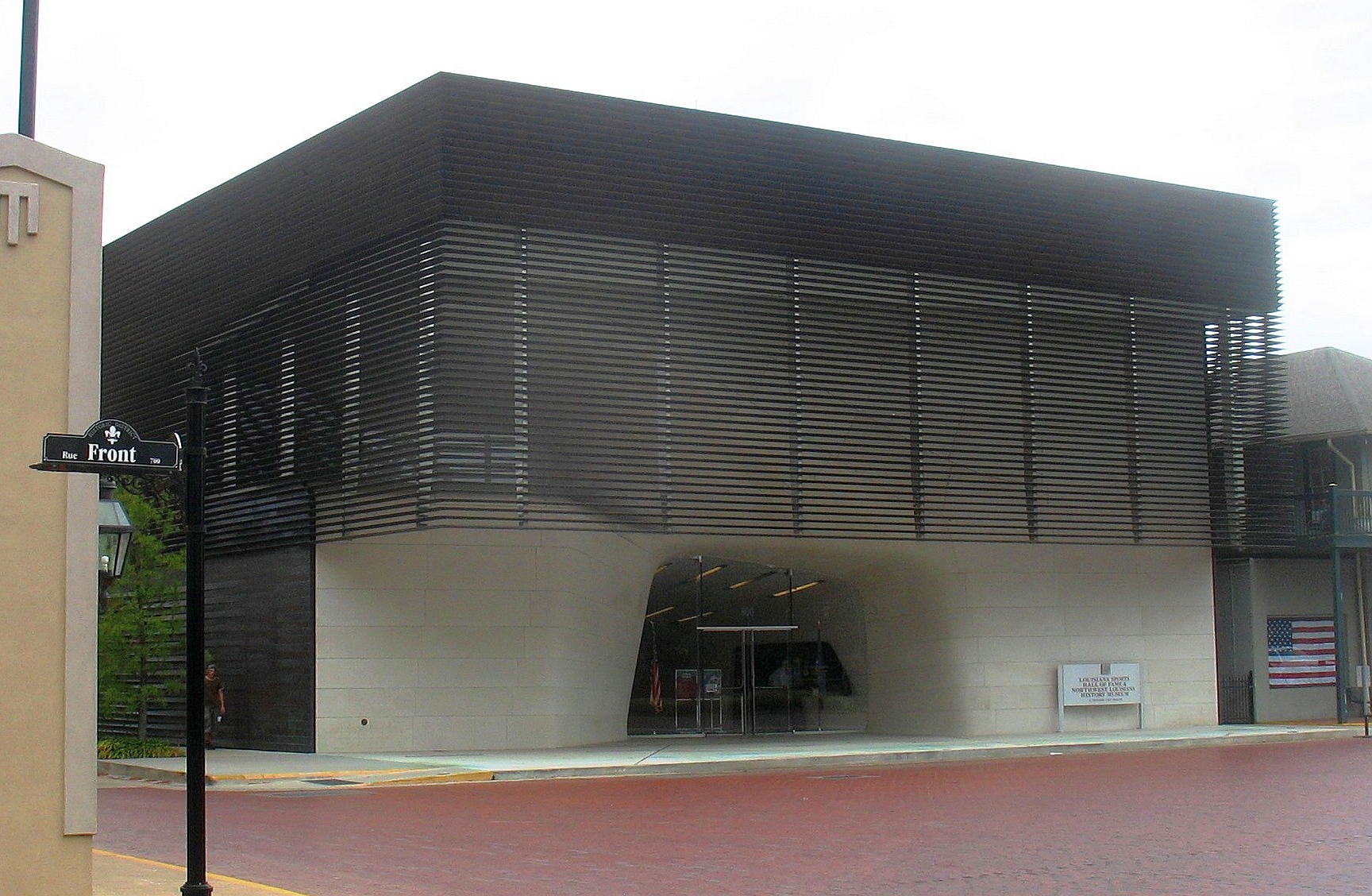
- Established: June 28, 2013
- Location: Natchitoches, Louisiana, United States
- Type: Hall of fame
- Executive director: Ronnie Rantz

The Louisiana Sports Hall of Fame (LHOF) is an hall of fame exhibit that honors the accomplishments of athletes, coaches and other sports figures in the U.S. state of Louisiana. Located in a facility in the downtown historic district of the city of Natchitoches, the LHOF is part of the broader Louisiana Sports Hall of Fame & Northwest Louisiana History Museum – Natchitoches. The LHOF formally opened on June 28, 2013.

== History ==
The museum had been fifty-five years in search of a permanent home. Many of the artifacts had previously been stored at Prather Coliseum on the campus of Northwestern State University in Natchitoches.

In the aftermath of Hurricane Katrina, there were concerns that the proposed museum would be removed from the list of approved projects in 2005 by the Louisiana Bond Commission. However, then-state representative Taylor Townsend informed Hall of Fame executive director Doug Ireland that the sports museum, unlike other similar proposals, had survived the vetting process.

Natchitoches Mayor Lee Posey said the museum is a "tremendous" boost to Natchitoches-area tourism. On June 28, 2013, the LHOF was officially opened. Then-Lieutenant Governor Jay Dardenne, whose office handles state tourism matters, was on hand for the grand opening.

In 2016, Ronnie Rantz, a former Louisiana State University pitcher and sports broadcaster, was chosen to lead the Sports Hall of Fame. In 2020, the exhibit postponed its induction ceremony for the Class of 2020 owing to the COVID-19 pandemic.

== Inductees ==
The first inductees were named to the Hall of Fame in 1958.

Sortable table
| Name | Sport/Team/City | Year Inducted |
|---|---|---|
| Mahmoud Abdul-Rauf | Basketball, LSU | 2021 |
| Danny Abramowicz | Pro Football, New Orleans Saints | 1992 |
| Joe Adcock | Major League Baseball, Coushatta, LSU | 1975 |
| Joe Aillet | Football Coach, Louisiana Tech University | 1973 |
| Charles Alexander | Football, LSU, NFL | 1993 |
| Teddy Allen | Journalism, Shreveport | 2022 |
| Billy Allgood | Coach, Louisiana College | 1999 |
| John Altobello | High School Basketball Coach, New Orleans | 1994 |
| Morten Andersen | Football, New Orleans Saints | 2011 |
| Eric Andolsek | Football, LSU | 2022 |
| Bobby Ardoin | Sportswriter, Louisiana-Lafayette | 2024 |
| Ronald Ardoin | Horse Racing Jockey, Jockey's Agent | 2013 |
| Alexander Athas | Basketball, Track & Field, Tulane | 1992 |
| Seimone Augustus | Basketball, LSU | 2024 |
| Carrice Russell Baker | Basketball Coach, Louisiana Tech, Jena, Winnsboro | 2009 |
| Bill Banker | Football, Tulane | 1978 |
| Gary Barbaro | Football, New Orleans/Nicholls State/NFL | 2000 |
| Leon Barmore | Women's Basketball Coach, Louisiana Tech | 2004 |
| Alana Beard | Basketball, Shreveport, WNBA | 2023 |
| Albert Belle | Major League Baseball, LSU | 2005 |
| Skip Bertman | Baseball Coach, LSU | 2002 |
| Bernie Bierman | Football Coach, Tulane | 1967 |
| Courtney Blades | Softball, Baton Rouge | 2021 |
| Buddy Blair | Basketball, Track, Baseball, LSU | 1981 |
| Mel Blount | Football, Southern University, NFL | 1989 |
| Vida Blue | Major League Baseball, Mansfield | 1990 |
| Tommy Bolt | Professional Golf, Shreveport | 1974 |
| Zeke Bonura | Major League Baseball, New Orleans | 1989 |
| Sid Bowman | Track and Field, LSU | 1976 |
| Warren Braden | Football, Southern University, NFL | 1998 |
| Terry Bradshaw | Football, Louisiana Tech, NFL | 1988 |
| John Brady | Basketball coach, LSU | 2026 |
| Drew Brees | Football, New Orleans Saints | 2024 |
| Frank Brian | Basketball, LSU, NBA | 1986 |
| Lou Brock | Major League Baseball, Southern University | 1983 |
| Michael Brooks | Football, NFL | 2009 |
| Marty Broussard | Sports Medicine | 2009 |
| Billy Brown | Track and Field, LSU | 1969 |
| Bruce Brown | Journalism, Lafayette | 2023 |
| Charlie Brown | High School Football Coach, Neville-Monroe | 2001 |
| Dale Brown | Basketball Coach, LSU | 1999 |
| Gernon Brown | High School Coach, Jesuit-New Orleans | 1990 |
| James E. "Big Fuzzy" Brown | High School Football Coach, Istrouma-Baton Rouge | 1992 |
| Joe Brown | Professional Boxing, New Orleans | 1976 |
| P. J. Brown | Basketball, Louisiana Tech, NBA | 2016 |
| Ro Brown | Journalism, New Orleans | 2021 |
| Willard Brown | Major League Baseball, Negro league baseball, Shreveport | 2007 |
| Willie Brown | Football, Grambling, NFL | 1985 |
| Pat Browne | U.S. Golf Champion | 1998 |
| Queen Brumfield | Women's Basketball, Southeastern Louisiana University | 2002 |
| Buck Buchanan | Football, Grambling, NFL | 1986 |
| Tom Burnett | Southland Conference Commissioner, NCAA administrator | 2024 |
| Jerry Byrd | Sportswriter for the Shreveport Journal and Bossier Press-Tribune | 1996 |
| Paul Byrd | Baseball, LSU | 2023 |
| Chris Cagle | Football, Merryville, USL, Army | 1960 |
| Billy Cannon | Football, LSU, AFL, NFL | 1976 |
| Tony Canzoneri | Professional Boxing, Slidell | 1959 |
| Harold Carmichael | Football, Southern University, NFL | 1989 |
| Roger Carr | Football, Louisiana Tech, NFL | 2012 |
| Mark Carrier | Football, NFL | 2010 |
| Tommy Casanova | Football, LSU, NFL | 1985 |
| Jim Cason | Football, LSU, NFL | 2003 |
| Don Chaney | Basketball, McKinley-Baton Rouge, NBA | 1991 |
| Jimmy Childress | High School Football Coach, Ruston and Monroe | 2001 |
| Jay Cicero | Sports Management, New Orleans | 2022 |
| Perry Clark | Basketball, Tulane | 2024 |
| Will Clark | Major League Baseball, New Orleans | 2004 |
| Marques Colston | Football, New Orleans Saints | 2021 |
| Hollis Conway | Track and Field, Shreveport, Louisiana-Lafayette, USA Olympic Team | 2004 |
| Jim Corbett | Athletic Director, LSU | 1985 |
| Daniel Cormier | Mixed Martial Arts | 2024 |
| Clifford Ann Creed | Professional Golf, Alexandria | 1985 |
| John David Crow | Football, Springhill, NFL | 1976 |
| J.T. Curtis | Football coach | 2010 |
| Jerry Dalrymple | Football, Tulane | 1964 |
| Alvin Dark | Major League Baseball, Lake Charles, LSU | 1976 |
| Willie Davenport | Track and Field, Southern University, USA Olympic Team | 1988 |
| Tommy Davis | Football, LSU, NFL | 1988 |
| Walter Davis | Track & Field, LSU | 2023 |
| Wendell Davis | Football, LSU, NFL | 2023 |
| Willie Davis | Football, Grambling, NFL | 1977 |
| Fred Dean | Football, Louisiana Tech, NFL | 1995 |
| Joe Dean | Athletic Director, LSU | 2001 |
| Eddie Delahoussaye | Horse Racing Jockey, New Iberia | 2002 |
| Joe Delaney | Football, Northwestern State University, NFL | 1996 |
| Bill Dickey | Major League Baseball, Bastrop | 1981 |
| Mel Didier | Baseball, Baton Rouge, LSU | 2003 |
| Paul Dietzel | Football Coach, LSU | 1988 |
| Dave Dixon | Entrepreneur, New Orleans | 1999 |
| Dr. Jack Doland | Football Coach, McNeese State | 2002 |
| Atley Donald | Major League Baseball, Louisiana Tech, Choudrant | 1982 |
| Glenn Dorsey | Football, LSU | 2021 |
| Villis P. “Bo” Dowden | Fishing, Northwestern State | 2021 |
| A. J. Duhe | Football, LSU | 2001 |
| Steve Duhon | Rodeo, LSU | 2022 |
| Joe Dumars | Basketball, Natchitoches/McNeese State/NBA | 2003 |
| Matt Dunigan | Football, Louisiana Tech, CFL | 2019 |
| Ralph Dupas | Professional Boxing, New Orleans | 1994 |
| Mark Duper | Football, Northwestern State, NFL | 2005 |
| Claney Duplechin | Track & Field / Cross Country Coach, Baton Rouge | 2022 |
| Billy Joe Dupree | Football, West Monroe/NFL | 2003 |
| Tom Dutton | Football, LSU | 1969 |
| Eddie Dyer | Major League Baseball, Morgan City | 1966 |
| Ken Ellis | Football, Southern, NFL | 2000 |
| Wilbert Ellis | Baseball, Grambling State | 2024 |
| Ron Estay | Football, LSU | 2006 |
| Jahri Evans | Football, New Orleans Saints | 2022 |
| Lenny Fant | Basketball Coach, Northeast Louisiana University | 1998 |
| Kevin Faulk | Football, LSU | 2015 |
| Marshall Faulk | Football, NFL | 2009 |
| Doc Fenton | Football, LSU | 1968 |
| Joe Ferguson | Football, Shreveport, NFL | 1994 |
| Jim Finks | Administrator, New Orleans Saints | 2000 |
| Chuck Finley | Baseball, ULM, Monroe | 2006 |
| Norman Allen "Norm" Fletcher | Broadcaster, NSU Demons | 2010 |
| Peggy Flournoy | Football, Tulane | 1968 |
| Edward Flynn | Boxing, New Orleans | 2022 |
| Steve Foley | Football, Tulane, Jesuit-New Orleans, NFL | 2002 |
| Garland Forman, Jr. | Journalism, Louisiana College | 2022 |
| Matt Forte | Football, Tulane, NFL | 2023 |
| Sylvia Fowles | Basketball, LSU, WNBA, USA Olympics | 2026 |
| Alton "Red" Franklin | High School Football Coach, Haynesville | 2004 |
| John Franks | Horse Racing Thoroughbred Owner, Shreveport | 1995 |
| Eddy Furniss | Baseball, Louisiana State | 2012 |
| Stan Galloway | Football Coach, Southeastern Louisiana University | 1989 |
| Lin Gamble | Women's Basketball, Grand Cane | 2001 |
| Ralph Garr | Major League Baseball, Grambling | 1985 |
| L. J. Hoss Garrett | High School Football Coach, Louisiana Tech, Ruston | 1997 |
| Leslie Gaudet | High School Basketball Coach, Pine Prairie | 1997 |
| Paul Geisler | Football, Centenary | 1967 |
| Larry Gilbert | Baseball, New Orleans | 1964 |
| Matt Gordy | Track and Field, LSU | 1985 |
| Tad Gormley | Coach, Tulane, LSU, Loyola | 1968 |
| Hoyle Granger | Football, Mississippi State, NFL | 2005 |
| Mike Green | Basketball, Louisiana Tech, NBA | 1996 |
| Grits Gresham | Outdoorsman, Natchitoches | 1989 |
| Bob Groseclose | Track & Field Coach, Northeast Louisiana University | 1992 |
| Eric Guerin | Horse Racing Jockey, Maringouin | 1984 |
| Ron Guidry | Major League Baseball, Lafayette, USL | 1992 |
| Sue Gunter | Women's Basketball Coach, LSU | 2005 |
| Freddie Haas | Amateur Golf, New Orleans | 1978 |
| Darryl Hamilton | Major League Baseball, Baton Rouge, Nicholls State | 2008 |
| Jake Hanna | Football, Centenary | 1978 |
| Billy Hardin | Track and Field, LSU | 1998 |
| Slats Hardin | Track and Field, LSU | 1962 |
| James "Shack" Harris | Football, Monroe, Grambling, NFL | 1999 |
| Gayle Hatch | Weightlifting Coach, Baton Rouge, Northwestern State | 2008 |
| Joel Hawkins | High School Basketball Coach, Southern Lab, Lake Providence, G.W. Griffin | 2007 |
| Elvin Hayes | Basketball, Rayville, NBA | 1988 |
| Ed Head | Major League Baseball, Selma | 1965 |
| T.P. "Skipper" Heard | LSU Athletics Director | 2011 |
| Bobby Hebert | Football, Cut Off, Northwestern State, NFL, New Orleans Saints | 2000 |
| Jay Hebert | Professional Golf, Lafayette | 1982 |
| Lionel Hebert | Professional Golf, Lafayette | 1982 |
| Lee Hedges | Winningest high-school football coach in Shreveport, 1955-1965; 1967-1984 | 2010 |
| Bob Henderson | Director, University of Louisiana at Lafayette | 1999 |
| Charlie Hennigan | Football, Northwestern State University, AFL | 1978 |
| Pat Henry | Track & Field Coach, LSU | 2021 |
| Tommy Henry | High School Administrator, Alexandria | 2008 |
| Pete Herman | Professional Boxing, New Orleans | 1960 |
| Ron Higgins | Sportswriter | 2024 |
| Tynes Hildebrand | Basketball coach and athletic director at Northwestern State University | 2014 |
| Dalton Hilliard | Football, LSU, New Orleans Saints | 1997 |
| Tom Hinton | Football, Louisiana Tech, CFL | 2005 |
| Fred Hobdy | Basketball Coach, Grambling | 1994 |
| Sonja Hogg | Women's Basketball Coach, Louisiana Tech | 2009 |
| Kathy Holloway | High School Women's Basketball Coach, Alexandria | 2026 |
| Bob Hopkins | Basketball, Grambling, NBA | 1978 |
| Joe Horn | Football, New Orleans Saints | 2026 |
| Cal Hubbard | Football & Baseball, Centenary | 1966 |
| Stan Humphries | Football, ULM, NFL | 2007 |
| Walter Imahara | Weightlifting, Baton Rouge | 2023 |
| Doug Ireland | Journalism, Northwestern State | 2021 |
| Kevin Jackson | Wrestling, LSU | 2024 |
| Luke Jackson | Basketball, Olympic & NBA | 1998 |
| Rich Jackson | Football, Southern University, NFL | 1994 |
| Rickey Jackson | Professional Football, New Orleans Saints | 1999 |
| Susan Jackson | Gymnastics, LSU | 2022 |
| Dana Jenkins | Track and Field, LSU | 1968 |
| Kathy Johnson (Clarke) | Gymnastics, Centenary College, USA Olympic Team | 1996 |
| Gary "Big Hands" Johnson | Football, Grambling, NFL | 1991 |
| Vaughan Johnson | Professional Football, New Orleans Saints | 2011 |
| Charlie Joiner | Football, Grambling, NFL | 1990 |
| Bert Jones | Football, LSU, NFL | 1986 |
| Biff Jones | Football Coach, LSU | 1966 |
| Dub Jones | Football, Tulane, NFL | 1982 |
| Esther Jones | Track, LSU | 2007 |
| Kerry Joseph | Football, McNeese State | 2024 |
| Ken Kavanaugh | Football, LSU, NFL | 1970 |
| Pam Kelly (Flowers) | Basketball, Louisiana Tech | 1994 |
| Kenny Konz | Football, LSU, NFL | 2000 |
| Venus Lacy | Pro Basketball, Louisiana Tech, USA Olympic Team | 2014 |
| Ernie Ladd | Football, Grambling, AFL, NFL | 1994 |
| Dwight "Bo" Lamar | Basketball, University of Southwestern Louisiana | 1984 |
| Maxie Lambright | Football Coach, Louisiana Tech | 1986 |
| Hank Lauricella | Football, New Orleans | 1983 |
| Lester Lautenschlaeger | Football, Football Coach, Tulane | 1983 |
| Janice Lawrence (Braxton) | Pro Basketball, Louisiana Tech, USA Olympic Team | 2005 |
| Gil Lebreton | Journalist, New Orleans | 2026 |
| Walter Ledet | Track & Field Coach, Northwestern State University | 1995 |
| Bill Lee | Major League Baseball, Plaquemine | 1972 |
| Eun Jung Lee (Ok) | Basketball, Northeast Louisiana University | 1998 |
| Albert Lewis | Football, Mansfield, Grambling, NFL | 2004 |
| Frank Lewis | Football, Grambling | 2006 |
| Bob Love | Basketball, Southern University, NBA | 1983 |
| Bobby Lowther | Basketball, Track & Field, LSU | 1995 |
| Jonathan Lucroy | Baseball, ULL, MLB | 2026 |
| Johnny Lynch | Football Referee, New Orleans | 1975 |
| Lori Lyons | Journalism, Loyola University | 2023 |
| Ted Lyons | Major League Baseball, Lake Charles | 1960 |
| Terry McAulay | Football Referee, LSU | 2021 |
| Charles McClendon | Football Coach, LSU | 1982 |
| Dick McCloskey | High School Football Coach, Hanson Memorial-Franklin | 2003 |
| Max McGee | Football, Tulane, NFL | 1984 |
| Jimmy McGonagill | Amateur Golf, Shreveport | 1970 |
| Bo McMillin | Football Coach, Centenary | 1964 |
| Rudy Macklin | Basketball, LSU, NBA | 2005 |
| Carl Maddox | Athletic Director, LSU | 1986 |
| Ron Maestri | Baseball Coach, University of New Orleans | 1995 |
| Faize Mahfouz | High School Football Coach, Eunice, New Iberia | 1981 |
| Paul Mainieri | Baseball Coach, LSU | 2023 |
| Karl Malone | Basketball, Summerfield, Louisiana Tech, NBA | 2008 |
| Archie Manning | Football, New Orleans Saints | 1988 |
| Eli Manning | Football, New Orleans, NFL | 2023 |
| Peyton Manning | Football, New Orleans, NFL | 2019 |
| Pete Maravich | Basketball, LSU, NBA | 1984 |
| Oliver Marcelle | Negro league baseball, Thibodaux, New Orleans | 1996 |
| Leonard Marshall | Football, Franklin, LSU, NFL | 2008 |
| John James Marshall | Journalist, Louisiana Tech, Shreveport | 2026 |
| Eric Martin | Football, LSU, New Orleans Saints | 2006 |
| Tommy Mason | Football, Tulane, NFL | 1981 |
| Todd McClure | Football, LSU, NFL | 2026 |
| Mike McConathy | Basketball coach, NSU | 2026 |
| Ben McDonald | Baseball, MLB | 2010 |
| Abe Mickal | Football, LSU | 1970 |
| Sheldon Mickles | Journalism, LSU | 2021 |
| Rod Milburn | Track and Field, Southern University, USA Olympics | 1988 |
| Fred Miller | Football, LSU, NFL | 1990 |
| Sam Mills | Football, New Orleans Saints | 2001 |
| Brian Mitchell | Football, ULL, NFL | 2007 |
| Frank Monica | Football coach | 2024 |
| J. D. Mooney | Horse Racing Jockey, New Orleans | 1976 |
| Bernie Moore | Football, Track Coach, LSU | 1963 |
| Jim Mora | Football Coach, New Orleans Saints | 2003 |
| Al Moreau | Track and Field, LSU | 1963 |
| Jackie Moreland | Basketball, Louisiana Tech | 1984 |
| Johnny Morriss | Track & Field, University of Southwestern Louisiana | 1989 |
| Warren Morris | Baseball, LSU, MLB, USA Olympics | 2026 |
| Kim Mulkey | Basketball, Louisiana Tech, USA Olympic Team | 1990 |
| A.W. Mumford | Football Coach, Southern University | 1984 |
| Charles Cotton Nash | Basketball, Baseball, Lake Charles High School | 1993 |
| Calvin Natt | Basketball, Northeast Louisiana University, NBA | 1993 |
| George Leon Nattin Jr. | Basketball, Bossier High School, LSU | Date missing |
| Shaquille O'Neal | Basketball, Louisiana State, NBA, USA Olympic Team | 2013 |
| Britni Sneed Newman | Softball, LSU | 2022 |
| Mel Ott | Major League Baseball, New Orleans | 1963 |
| Emmett Paré | Tennis Coach, Tulane | 1997 |
| Robert Parish | Basketball, Woodlawn-Shreveport, Centenary, NBA | 2001 |
| Raymond "Buddy" Parker | Football, Centenary, NFL | 1991 |
| Mel Parnell | Major League Baseball, New Orleans | 1963 |
| Willie Pastrano | Professional Boxing, New Orleans | 1965 |
| Audrey "Mickey" Patterson (Tyler) | Track and Field, New Orleans, USA Olympics | 2000 |
| John Pennel | Track & Field, Northeast Louisiana University | 1976 |
| Warren Perkins | Basketball, Tulane, NBA | 2007 |
| Craig Perret | Horse Racing Jockey, New Orleans | 2006 |
| Jimmy Perrin | Professional Boxing, New Orleans | 1965 |
| Kim Perrot | Basketball, ULL, WNBA | 2007 |
| John Petitbon | Football, Notre Dame, NFL | 1998 |
| Richie Petitbon | Football, Tulane, NFL | 1992 |
| Bob Pettit | Basketball, LSU, NBA | 1973 |
| Jelly Pigott | High School Basketball Coach, Jena | 2008 |
| Howie Pollet | Major League Baseball, New Orleans | 1981 |
| Harold Porter | Track & Field, University of Southwestern Louisiana | 1997 |
| H. Lee Prather | Basketball Coach, Northwestern State University | 1965 |
| Eddie Price | Football, Tulane | 1975 |
| Greg Procell | High School Basketball, Ebarb | 1988 |
| Joe Profit | Football, Monroe, Northeast Louisiana University | 1999 |
| Harry Rabenhorst | Coach, LSU | 1970 |
| Gary Reasons | Football, Northwestern State University, NFL | 1997 |
| Willis Reed | Basketball, Grambling, NBA | 1981 |
| Bill Reigel | Basketball, McNeese State University | 1988 |
| Dutch Reinhardt | Basketball Coach, University of Southwestern Louisiana | 1986 |
| Nick Revon | Basketball, New Orleans | 2002 |
| Shane Reynolds | Major League Baseball, Bastrop | 2014 |
| J. R. Richard | Major League Baseball, Vienna | 1988 |
| Ham Richardson | Tennis, Tulane University | 1983 |
| Willie Roaf | Football, Louisiana Tech, New Orleans Saints, NFL | 2009 |
| Isiah Robertson | Football, Southern University, NFL | 1996 |
| Johnny Red Robertson | High School Football Coach, Ferriday | 2002 |
| Scotty Robertson | Basketball Coach, Louisiana Tech, NBA | 1997 |
| Rick Robey | Basketball, New Orleans | 2006 |
| Tony Robichaux | Baseball Coach, McNeese State, University of Louisiana | 2022 |
| Eddie Robinson | Football Coach, Grambling | 1985 |
| Johnny Robinson | Football, LSU, NFL | 1984 |
| Randy Romero | Horse Racing Jockey, Erath | 2005 |
| Rolland Romero | Track and Field, Loyola, US. Olympic Team | 1974 |
| Connie Ryan | Major League Baseball, New Orleans | 1993 |
| Nick Saban | Football Coach, LSU | 2020 |
| Leo Sanford | Football, Louisiana Tech, NFL | 1990 |
| Michael Sanders | Basketball, DeRidder, UCLA, NBA | 2000 |
| Tony Sardisco | Football, Shreveport, Tulane, AFL | 2004 |
| Glynn Saulters | Basketball, Northeast Louisiana University | 1981 |
| Rags Scheuermann | Baseball Coach, Delgado, Loyola | 1990 |
| Clark Shaughnessy | Football Coach, Tulane, Loyola | 1970 |
| Don Shows | Football Coach, Louisiana Tech, West Monroe | 2011 |
| Ray Sibille | Horseracing | 2024 |
| James Silas | Basketball, Tallulah, ABA | 1995 |
| Monk Simons | Football, Tulane | 1969 |
| Jackie Smith | Football, Northwestern State University, NFL | 1983 |
| Lee Smith | Major League Baseball, Castor | 2003 |
| Neil Smith | Football, New Orleans, NFL | 2004 |
| Bobby Spell | Professional Softball, Lake Charles | 1977 |
| Freddie Spencer | Motorcycle Racing, Shreveport | 2009 |
| Rusty Staub | Major League Baseball, New Orleans | 1989 |
| Jerry Stovall | Football, LSU | 1981 |
| George "Bo" Strickland | Baseball, New Orleans | 2006 |
| Dewain Strother | High School Women's Basketball Coach, Florien | 2026 |
| Pat Studstill | Football, Shreveport, NFL | 1999 |
| Dave Styron | Track & Field, Northeast Louisiana University | 1977 |
| Don Styron | Track & Field, Northeast Louisiana University | 1977 |
| Hal Sutton | Golf, PGA | 2009 |
| Pat Swilling | Football, New Orleans Saints | 2007 |
| Edna Tarbutton | High School Basketball Coach, Baskin | 1993 |
| Jim Taylor | Football, LSU | 1974 |
| Rosey Taylor | Football, Grambling, NFL | 1996 |
| Red Thomas | Basketball, Northwestern State University | 1969 |
| Sheila Thompson (Johnson) | Basketball, Louisiana College, Pitkin | 2006 |
| Charles Tillman | Football, Louisiana-Lafayette, NFL | 2020 |
| Gaynell Tinsley | Football, LSU | 1959 |
| Y. A. Tittle | Football, LSU, NFL | 1972 |
| Charlie Tolar | Football, Northwestern State University, AFL | 1991 |
| Andrew Toney | Basketball, University of Southwestern Louisiana, NBA | 1992 |
| Emmett Toppino | Track and Field, Loyola | 1981 |
| Jack Torrance | Track and Field, LSU | 1961 |
| Harry Turpin | Football Coach, Northwestern State University | 1974 |
| Steve Van Buren | Football, LSU, NFL | 1961 |
| Mike Vining | College basketball coach | 2010 |
| Sparky Wade | Basketball, LSU | 1962 |
| Joyce Walker | Basketball, LSU, Harlem Globetrotters | 1997 |
| Everson Walls | Football, Grambling, NFL | 1998 |
| Ralph Ward | Basketball Coach, McNeese State University | 1991 |
| Ron Washington | Baseball Coach, New Orleans | 2023 |
| Teresa Weatherspoon | Basketball, Louisiana Tech, WNBA, USA Olympic Team | 2010 |
| Rickie Weeks Jr. | Baseball, Southern University | 2021 |
| Barbara White Boddie | Golf, Shreveport | 2008 |
| Sammy White | Football, Grambling, NFL | 1995 |
| Aeneas Williams | Football, New Orleans, Southern, NFL | 2008 |
| Doug Williams | Football, Grambling, NFL | 1993 |
| Kyle Williams | Football, LSU, NFL | 2022 |
| Pat Williams | Football, NFL | 2026 |
| Earl "Moose" Wilson | Major League Baseball, Ponchatoula | 1996 |
| Larry Wilson | Basketball | 2010 |
| Roy "Moonie" Winston | Football, LSU, NFL | 1991 |
| M. L. Woodruff | Baseball Coach, Baton Rouge | 2023 |
| Orlando Woolridge | Basketball | 2010 |
| Jim Wynn | Louisiana Sports Writers Association | 2006 |
| Tank Younger | Football, Grambling, NFL | 1973 |
| Don Zimmerman | Football, Tulane | 1975 |
