= Athletics at the 1904 Summer Olympics – Men's 400 metres hurdles =

Men's 400 metres hurdles at the Games of the III Olympiad
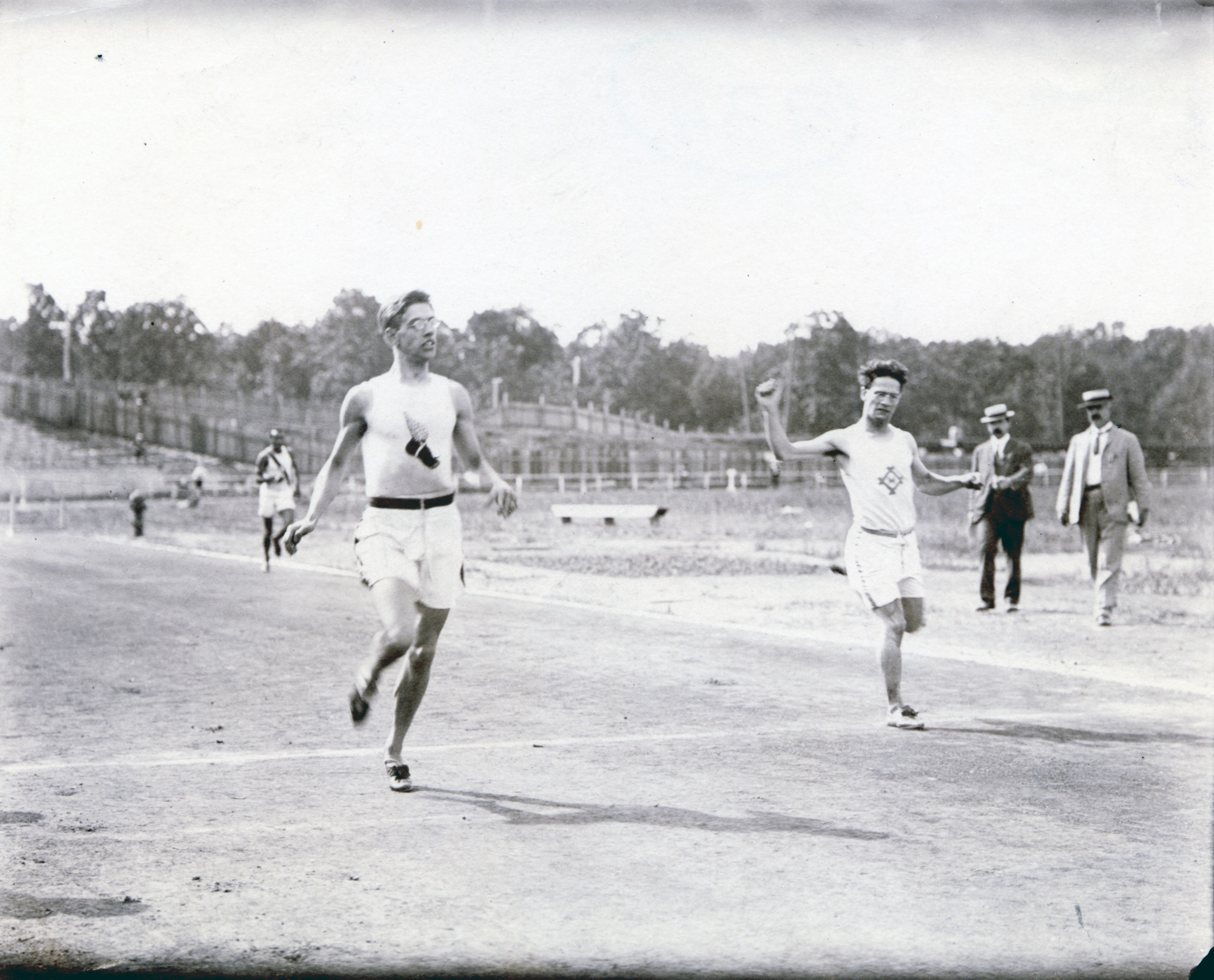
- Finish of the event
- Venue: Francis Field
- Date: August 31, 1904
- Competitors: 4 from 1 nation
- Winning time: 53.0 OR

Medalists
1st place, gold medalist(s)		Harry Hillman; United States
2nd place, silver medalist(s)		Frank Waller; United States
3rd place, bronze medalist(s)		George Poage; United States

The men's 400 metres hurdles was a track and field athletics event held as part of the Athletics at the 1904 Summer Olympics programme. It was the second time the event was held. Four athletes from the United States participated. The competition was held on August 31, 1904. The event was won by Harry Hillman, with Frank Waller taking silver and George Poage bronze.

== Background ==
This was the second time the event was held. Introduced along with the men's 200 metres hurdles in 1900, the men's 400 metres hurdles was the only one of the two new hurdles events in 1900–1904 that would stay on the programme long-term, joining the 110 metres hurdles that had been contested in 1896. The 400 metres version would be held in 1900, 1904, and 1908 before being left off for one Games in 1912; when the Olympics returned after World War I, the men's 400 metres hurdles was back and would continue to be contested at every Games thereafter.

The United States was the only nation competing, making its second appearance.

== Competition format ==
The competition consisted of a single round, with only four hurdlers competing. The hurdles used were the low (2.5 feet high) hurdles typical of the 200 metres hurdles event rather than the 3-foot hurdles standard for the 400 metres hurdles event.

== Records ==
These were the standing world and Olympic records (in seconds) prior to the 1904 Summer Olympics.

World record	Jerome Buck (USA)	56.4^{*}	New York City, United States	19 September 1896
Olympic record	Walter Tewksbury (USA)	57.6^{**}	Paris, France	15 July 1900

^{*} unofficial 440 yards (= 402.34 m)

^{**} This track was 500 metres in circumference.

Harry Hillman's time of 53.0 seconds was ineligible for world record consideration because he knocked down a hurdle.

== Schedule ==
Date	Time	Round
Wednesday, 31 August 1904		Final

== Results ==
Rank	Athlete	Nation	Time	Notes
1st place, gold medalist(s)	Harry Hillman	United States	53.0	OR
2nd place, silver medalist(s)	Frank Waller	United States	53.2	
3rd place, bronze medalist(s)	George Poage	United States	56.8	
4	George Varnell	United States	Unknown	
—	Charles Bacon	United States	DNS	
—	Edward Cairns	United States	DNS	
—	Frank Castleman	United States	DNS	
—	Edwin Clapp	United States	DNS	
—	Will Gunn	New Zealand	DNS	
—	Harry Halleck	United States	DNS	
—	Leslie McPherson	Australia	DNS	
—	Frederick Schule	United States	DNS	

== Sources ==
- Wudarski, Pawel (1999). "Wyniki Igrzysk Olimpijskich" (in Polish).
