= Alexander Athas =

American basketball player (1922–2009)

Personal information
- Full name: Alexander Athas
- Nickname: Greek
- Born: October 6, 1922 United States
- Died: April 29, 2009 (aged 86) Metairie, Louisiana

Sport
- Country: United States
- Sport: Basketball
- Team: Various (see article)

Alexander "Greek" Athas (6 October 1922 – 29 April 2009) was an American basketball player and sports celebrity. He is a member of the Louisiana, Greater New Orleans, Tulane, American Hellenic Educational Progressive Association (AHEPA) and Warren Easton Halls of Fame.

== Basketball career ==
Athas attended Warren Easton Senior High School in New Orleans, Louisiana, graduating in 1942. He was a letterman in football, basketball and track, and is a member of the Warren Easton Hall of Fame.

"Greek" Athas attended Tulane University during the time period 1943–48. In the 1943–44 basketball season, he led the SEC conference in scoring (14.1 points per game) and set a single-game tournament scoring record (28). Athas also played football and track while at Tulane. He was the SEC Champion in the 220-yard low hurdles and in the broad jump. He once won five events in a single track meet against LSU. His college career was interrupted by a stint in the U.S. Navy (1944–45) where he participated in the battle of Okinawa before returning to Tulane. He was a three-time All-SEC basketball selection at Tulane and is a member of the Tulane Athletic Hall of Fame.

Following his college career, Athas played professional basketball in the ABL for three years. He played for the Wilkes-Barre Barons (1949–50), the Utica Pros (1950–51), and the Elmira, New York Colonels (1951–52).

== Coaching and Teaching Career ==
Athas returned to his prep alma mater and coached basketball, track and football for 34 years at Warren Easton Senior High School in New Orleans, Louisiana. He retired in 1988.

== See also ==
- Louisiana Sports Hall of Fame
- Wilkes-Barre Barons
- Utica Pros
- Elmira Colonels
