= Daphne Athas =

American author (1923–2020)

- Born: November 19, 1923; Gloucester, Massachusetts, U.S.
- Died: July 28, 2020 (aged 96); Chapel Hill, North Carolina, U.S.
- Education: University of North Carolina at Chapel Hill
- Occupation: Writer

Daphne Athas (November 19, 1923 – July 28, 2020) was an American author, best known for the 1971 novel Entering Ephesus, which was included on Time magazine's Ten Best Fiction List of 1971. Her other books include The Weather of the Heart, The Fourth World, and Greece by Prejudice. Athas was the recipient of the Sir Walter Raleigh Award for Fiction and the University of North Carolina's Lifetime Mentor Award.

== Biography ==
=== Early years ===
Athas was born in Gloucester, Massachusetts, in November 1923. She was born into affluence, but her family's financial situation was altered by the Great Depression, and they were forced to move to Carrboro, North Carolina, in 1938. In her book, Chapel Hill In Plain Sight, Athas writes that "moving from paradise was an adventure in earthly demotion ... In 1936 Daddy decided the South offered more opportunity. He chose Chapel Hill, North Carolina, because it had a state university we could attend for little money, and he established a beachhead where we would join him."

Athas attended the University of North Carolina at Chapel Hill, from which she graduated in 1943. During her time as a writing student at UNC she worked with Phillips Russell and Betty Smith, the author of A Tree Grows In Brooklyn.

=== Professional life ===
During World War II Athas worked for the Office of War Information in New York City. Soon after, she taught as a Fulbright professor of American literature at the University of Tehran. In the 1950s Athas traveled to Greece where she explored her father's heritage and wrote the travel book Greece by Prejudice.

Athas began teaching at the University of North Carolina at Chapel Hill in 1968. While there, Athas created Glossolalia, a stylistics course which encourages students to experiment with grammatical style and rhythm. In 2007, Athas shared many of the exercises from the class in her book, Gram-O-Rama: Breaking the Rules. Although Athas retired in 2009, the class remains a beloved staple at UNC Chapel Hill.

=== Writings ===
Athas published her first novel, The Weather of the Heart in 1947. She credits Betty Smith for passing the novel along to the editor who eventually published the novel. In her book, Chapel Hill in Plain Sight she tells the story:

One day the phone rang and the voice said: "Hello, this is Betty Smith." Her growl was so familiar I slid back to childhood again. "I hear you're writing a novel. I'll read it if you'd like me to." Remorse, second thoughts, or retrenchment? For the first time in my life I called her Betty. I said, "But, Betty, it's only half done!" I never saw my manuscript again. It still had no title. She gave it to Jessie Rehder, the scout for Appleton, who gave it to Ted Purdy, my future editor, and they asked for an outline, and a year and a half later in 1947 it was published with the title The Weather of the Heart, a quotation from W.H. Auden.

Athas's second novel, The Fourth World (1956), focuses on a home for blind children. According to a review in Time magazine, "[Athas] digs a fictional ditch big enough to hold both the sighted and the sightless, and the world into which she leads the reader would seem simply nightmarish if it did not also ring simply true."

In 1971 Athas's book Entering Ephesus was featured on Time's Ten Best Fiction List and was a Cosmopolitan Book-Club selection. Although fiction, the book features characters inspired by Athas's life, as it tells the story of a New England family who moves south after their fortune is lost.

In 1978 Athas was awarded the Sir Raleigh Award for her novel, Cora. The book is a tragic love story about the doomed romance of an American GI and a 47-year-old widow on vacation in Greece.

In 1991 Athas published Crumbs for the Bogeyman, a collection of poems, and in 2010 she wrote her most recent novel, Chapel Hill in Plain Sight: Notes from the Other Side of the Tracks. In Chapel Hill in Plain Sight, Athas tells hidden stories of Chapel Hill. She goes into depth on how the town has changed over the course of the century, and shares her experiences with great artists who traveled to Chapel Hill over the years including Richard Wright, Paul Green, Gertrude Stein, and Clifford Odets.

In addition to her novels, Athas's work has appeared in a number of journals and periodicals including South Atlantic Quarterly, Frank, New World Writing, Botteghe Oscure, Shenandoah, American Letters and Commentary, Chicago Tribune Book World, Transatlantic Review, Hudson Review, College English, Philadelphia Inquirer, and The World and I.
