= Don Styron =

American hurdler

Donald Augustus Styron (born March 18, 1940) is the world record holder in the 200 meter low hurdles. He remained the current world record holder until 2025, partly because the event has not been run frequently by elite athletes since the early 1960s.

== Early life ==
Hurdler Don Styron was an identical twin, his younger brother (by 24 minutes) being David Styron (a sprinter). The brothers only had come to Colorado from southeast Kansas in 1955. During the Great Depression, the boys lived on a farm without electricity or running water until seventh grade. They would race each other home from their one-room schoolhouse. The move to Denver was a major social change. First they went to North High School where they were victims of a fight every day. The 5 ft 10 in (1.77 m) 140 pounds (64 kg) brothers demanded a change. They went west down 32nd Avenue to Wheat Ridge High School where they ran for track coach, Lew Hartzog. With points from the twins in multiple events, Wheat Ridge dominated local competition. After their graduation in 1957, Hartzog took a job establishing a new track program at Northeast Louisiana State College. Hartzog returned to recruit his former star athletes, finding them bailing hay in Wyoming. When they arrived in Monroe, Louisiana, they had to work out at a local high school. They had to help build their own track. Early on, David set the American Junior record in the 100 yard dash at 9.4. Both brothers were inducted into the Louisiana Sports Hall of Fame in 1977.

== The record ==
On April 2, 1960, in a dual meet against Louisiana State University, the 20-year-old hurdler ran a time of 21.9 for the straight 220 yard low hurdles—which is slightly longer (201.2 meters) than the metric distance recognized worldwide. That time has not been surpassed since. 1960 is the last year the IAAF recognized the world record in the 200 meter low hurdles.

The 220 yard Low Hurdles is one of the four events Jesse Owens set or tied World Records in during a 45-minute span on May 25, 1935—what many people have regarded as the greatest sports achievement. The previous mark of 22.5 was held by Karl Martin Lauer, the German Olympic hurdler, over the metric distance. As were all marks from that era, it was recorded by three hand stopwatches, as opposed to today's Fully Automatic Timing (FAT). The fastest FAT time recorded is now 22.30 (with a wind of -0.6 mps) set on May 16, 2010, by Andy Turner set at the Manchester City Games in a specially arranged race, but using standard conversion, Styron's mark is still superior. Turner beat a time by Olympian Laurent Ottoz of Italy in 1995. Ottoz had bettered the automatic time of 22.63 by British Olympic medalist and multi-time World Champion Colin Jackson, who held the world record in the much more common 110 metre hurdles for almost 13 years.

Two weeks after the 21.9, Styron ran 22.2 in Abilene, a week later a 22.3 in Baton Rouge, two more weeks later a 22.2 in Natchitoches, a week after that 22.3 in Lake Charles, then a 22.1 at the Modesto Relays, equal to the #2 time ever recorded by Elias Gilbert without a wind gauge. Styron's run had wind gauge recording he ran into a headwind, -0.9 mps. A year later he equaled that performance at the same track. In all, Styron holds 9 of the top 18 hand times recorded during that era. Two other people making that top list finished second to Styron, both were Olympic medalists, Dick Howard and Irvin Roberson. Styron did not get the opportunity to run for the NCAA Championship, 1959 was the last year the event was held. Traditionally, the event was not held in Olympic years.

The achievement merited Styron an appearance in the April 18, 1960 issue of Sports Illustrated as one of the "Faces in the Crowd." That year he was also ranked in the top 5 hurdlers in both the 110 Hurdles and 400 Hurdles, one of the few individuals to achieve such ranking simultaneously. Styron finished 6th in the 400 meter hurdles at the 1960 Olympic Trials. He remained a nationally ranked hurdler until 1962, tying the American record in the indoor 60 yard hurdles at 7.0. In 1962 he was rated as the best all around hurdler. Stryton's best chance of qualifying was in 1964, but without money, he had to hitchhike from Los Angeles to New Brunswick, New Jersey for the semi-Olympic Trials. He finished last.
