= Thomas Pinckney "Skipper" Heard =

Thomas Pinckney "Skipper" Heard (August 25, 1898 – July 11, 1980) was an American college athletics administrator and golf coach. He served as the athletic director at Louisiana State University (LSU) from 1931 until 1954.

Heard was an early pioneer in the establishment of legal and honest athletic grants-in-aid and oversaw LSU's entry into the Southeastern Conference as a charter member in 1933. In addition, he is the "father" of night football games at Louisiana State University and was a force behind three expansions of Tiger Stadium raising seating capacity from 12,000 to 67,500. He also had LSU football games broadcast on 50,000-watt clear-channel WWL-AM in 1942 giving LSU a national broadcast platform and made it possible for LSU to fly to long-distance inter-sectional football games starting in 1939. Heard also coached the LSU Tigers golf team to a national championship (1947).

Heard was inducted into the Louisiana Sports Hall of Fame in 2011.

== LSU night football ==
The change to night football started in 1931 under Heard. LSU was not the first school to play a night football game, but "after dinner" football games were popularized at LSU.

There were multiple reasons why. First, there were shift changes of refinery workers in Baton Rouge. Many couldn't attend afternoon games, but they could attend evening games with 8 p.m. kickoffs. Competition for fans also played a role. Tulane University, then a football power, was playing on Saturday afternoons. A late LSU kickoff would allow fans to attend Tulane or other games and then drive to Baton Rouge to watch LSU. The move extended LSU's fan base because in the 1930s almost 80 percent of LSU's fan base was within 30-mile radius of Baton Rouge. The afternoon heat in Louisiana also played a role in moving the games to night. Heard had lights installed at Tiger Stadium for the sum of $7,500.

== Tiger Stadium expansion ==
The first expansion of Tiger Stadium in 1931 from 12,000 to 22,000 seats was due to Heard. He learned that LSU president James M. Smith had $250,000 earmarked for dormitories. Heard sold Smith on the idea that the president could have his dormitories in the stadium simply by raising the stands on both sides and extending them to each goal line. Heard expanded Tiger Stadium for the second time in 1936 by enclosing the north end of the stadium to increase seating capacity to 46,000. In 1953, Tiger Stadium was expanded for the third time by 21,720 seats to 67,720 by enclosing the south end turning Tiger Stadium into a bowl configuration.

Due to stadium expansion in 1953, Heard was forced out of office in 1954. His persuasion of the state legislature to again enlarge Tiger Stadium was against the wishes of his boss, LSU president Troy H. Middleton, who badly wanted a new library built. Both projects eventually came to fruition, but it cost Heard his job.

== LSU Tigers head golf coach ==
Heard was head coach of the LSU Tigers golf team for two seasons from 1946 to 1947. The 1947 team won the NCAA National Championship along with the SEC Championship. LSU golfer Joe Moore won the individual SEC championship that same year. Heard's 1946 team also won the SEC championship.

== Personal life ==
Heard grew up in Pitkin, Louisiana and left high school to join the U.S. Navy during World War I. He served two years in the mine laying service before being discharged and returning to high school. He received his diploma in 1920 and was a school teacher for two years before enrolling at LSU.

At LSU, he joined Pi Alpha Omega local fraternity and caught the attention of Mike Donahue who made him an assistant student manager in 1924. By 1926, he was the senior athletics manager and helped move the athletics department to the new LSU campus. After graduation he was named the graduate manager of athletics, a post he held until he became Athletic Director. He helped Pi Alpha Omega become a chapter of Sigma Pi fraternity and was one of the first alumni initiated into the national organization.
