= 200 metres straight =

Track and field outdoor event of 200 metres on a straight track

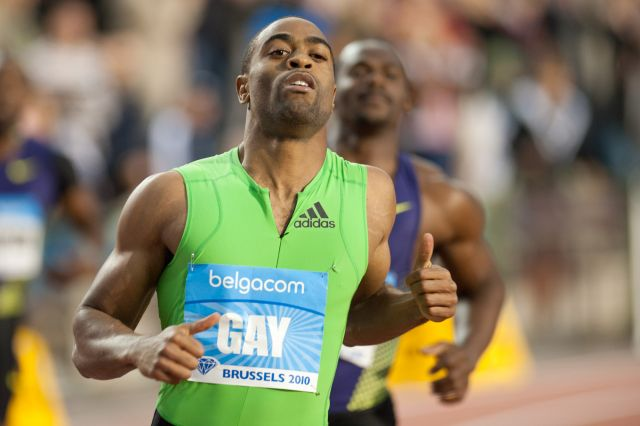
Tyson Gay, the current unofficial world record holder.

The 200 metres straight is a track and field outdoor event of 200 metres on a straight track.

In the 1960s, the straight 200 metres was a separate world record event for men until IAAF deleted this variation from its list of official records. The race was more common during the early to mid 20th century, when panhandle tracks, with 200 metre straightaways, were common. The United States Olympic Trials held the event on a straight until 1932.

Interest in the event was revived around 2009. Several street events, primarily in Manchester, Brussels and Boston have constructed special tracks to hold the races, inviting elite sprinters.

The imperial analogue of the 200 m straight is the 220 yards straight – held over 220 yards (201.17 m) – which has been contested at the USA Outdoor Track and Field Championships 38 times from 1887 to 1926.

== Record progression ==
=== Men ===
Time	Wind	Athlete	Nationality	Date	Place	Ref.
21.2		Bernard Wefers	United States	30 May 1896	New York City, United States	
21.2		Ralph Craig	United States	28 May 1910	Philadelphia, United States	
21.2		Donald Lippincott	United States	31 May 1913	Cambridge, United States	
21.2		Howard Drew	United States	28 February 1914	Claremont, United States	
21.2		George Parker	United States	2 October 1914	Fresno, United States	
20.8		Charlie Paddock	United States	26 March 1921	Berkeley, United States	
20.8		Charlie Paddock	United States	6 September 1924	West Orange, United States	
20.6		Roland Locke	United States	1 May 1926	Lincoln, United States	
20.6		Ralph Metcalfe	United States	12 August 1933	Budapest, Hungary	
20.3		Jesse Owens	United States	25 May 1935	Ann Arbor, United States	
20.2		Mel Patton	United States	7 May 1949	Los Angeles, United States	
20.1		Dave Sime	United States	11 May 1956	Durham, United States	
20.0		Dave Sime	United States	9 June 1956	Sanger, United States	
20.0		Frank Budd	United States	12 May 1962	Villanova, United States	
20.0		Tommie Smith	United States	13 March 1965	San Jose, United States	
19.5		Tommie Smith	United States	7 May 1966	San Jose, United States	
19.41	-0.4 m/s	Tyson Gay	United States	16 May 2010	Manchester, United Kingdom	

=== Women ===
Time	Wind	Athlete	Nationality	Date	Place	Ref.
22.55	+0.2 m/s	Allyson Felix	United States	16 May 2010	Manchester, United Kingdom	
21.76	+0.5 m/s	Shaunae Miller-Uibo	Bahamas	4 June 2017	Boston, United States	

== All-time top 25 ==
- h = hand timing
- NWI = no wind measurement

=== Men ===
Rank	Result	Wind (m/s)	Athlete	Nationality	Date	Place	Ref.
1	19.41	−0.4	Tyson Gay	United States	16 May 2010	Manchester	
2	19.5 h	NWI	Tommie Smith	United States	7 May 1966	San Jose	
3	19.84	+0.6	Wayde van Niekerk	South Africa	4 June 2017	Boston	
4	19.88	+0.3	Steven Gardiner	Bahamas	20 May 2018	Boston	
5	19.89	-0.3	Jerome Blake	Canada	23 May 2021	Boston	
6	19.93	-0.3	Zharnel Hughes	Great Britain	23 May 2021	Boston	
7	20.0 h	NWI	Frank Budd	United States	12 May 1962	Villanova	
7	20.0 h	NWI	Dave Sime	United States	9 June 1956	Sanger	
9	20.03	+0.3	Alonso Edward	Panama	20 May 2018	Boston	
9	20.03	+0.3	Jereem Richards	Trinidad and Tobago	20 May 2018	Boston	
11	20.09	-0.2	Kyle Greaux	Trinidad and Tobago	16 June 2019	Boston	
12	20.17	+0.6	BeeJay Lee	United States	4 June 2017	Boston	
13	20.2 h	NWI	Mel Patton	United States	7 May 1949	Los Angeles	
14	20.3 h	NWI	Jesse Owens	United States	25 May 1935	Ann Arbor	
15	20.36	+0.3	Josephus Lyles	United States	20 May 2018	Boston	
16	20.48	−0.6	Solomon Bockarie	Netherlands	4 September 2016	Brussels	
17	20.59	−0.4	Kim Collins	Saint Kitts and Nevis	16 May 2010	Manchester	
17	20.59	+0.6	Wallace Spearmon	United States	4 June 2017	Boston	
19	20.6 h	NWI	Roland Locke	United States	1 May 1926	Lincoln	
19	20.6 h	NWI	Ralph Metcalfe	United States	12 August 1933	Budapest	
21	20.64	+0.2	Jaysuma Saidy Ndure	Norway	20 May 2012	Manchester	
21	20.64	-0.2	Tony McQuay	United States	16 June 2019	Boston	
23	20.66	-0.4	Paul Hession	Ireland	16 May 2010	Manchester	
24	20.67	+0.2	James Ellington	Great Britain	20 May 2012	Manchester	
25	20.71	+0.2	David Neville	United States	20 May 2012	Manchester	

==== Notes ====
Below is a list of other times equal or superior to 20.71:

- Steven Gardiner also ran 20.49 (2019).
- Zharnel Hughes also ran 20.00 (2019).

=== Women ===
- Correct as of June 2021.

Rank	Result	Wind (m/s)	Athlete	Nationality	Date	Place	Ref.
1	21.76	+0.5	Shaunae Miller-Uibo	Bahamas	4 June 2017	Boston	
2	22.16	+0.9	Anastasia Le-Roy	Jamaica	20 May 2018	Boston	
3	22.31	+0.9	Joanna Atkins	United States	20 May 2018	Boston	
4	22.40	-0.1	Kortnei Johnson	United States	23 May 2021	Boston	
5	22.43	+0.9	Shakima Wimbley	United States	20 May 2018	Boston	
6	22.50	+0.5	Natasha Hastings	United States	4 June 2017	Boston	
7	22.55	+0.2	Allyson Felix	United States	16 May 2010	Manchester	
8	22.57	-0.1	Wadeline Jonathas	United States	23 May 2021	Boston	
9	22.62	-0.1	Michelle-Lee Ahye	Trinidad and Tobago	23 May 2021	Boston	
10	22.71	−0.3	Sanya Richards-Ross	United States	20 May 2012	Manchester	
11	22.81	+0.5	Kimberlyn Duncan	United States	4 June 2017	Boston	
12	22.86	+0.9	Tynia Gaither	Bahamas	20 May 2018	Boston	
13	22.96	+0.2	Debbie Ferguson-McKenzie	Bahamas	16 May 2010	Manchester	
14	23.10	+0.5	Phyllis Francis	United States	4 June 2017	Boston	
15	23.24	+0.1	Lynna Irby	United States	16 June 2019	Boston	
16	23.29	+0.2	Emily Freeman	Great Britain	16 May 2010	Manchester	
17	23.31	+0.1	Felicia Brown	United States	16 June 2019	Boston	
18	23.46	+0.1	Jessica Beard	United States	16 June 2019	Boston	
19	23.53	−0.3	Denisa Rosolova	Czech Republic	20 May 2012	Manchester	
20	23.56	−0.3	Margaret Adeoye	Great Britain	20 May 2012	Manchester	
21	23.75	+0.2	Lee McConnell	Great Britain	16 May 2010	Manchester	
22	23.79	−0.3	Nicola Sanders	Great Britain	20 May 2012	Manchester	
23	24.20	+0.6	Olivia Borlée	Belgium	4 September 2016	Brussels	
24	25.06	+0.6	Elke Vereecken	Belgium	4 September 2016	Brussels	
25	25.25	+0.6	Ine Hugaerts	Belgium	4 September 2016	Brussels	

==== Notes ====
Below is a list of other times equal or superior to 25.25:

- Shaunae Miller-Uibo also ran 22.08 (2021).
- Tynia Gaither also ran 22.96 (2021).
- Anastasia Le-Roy also ran 23.12 (2019).
- Shakima Wimbley also ran 23.40 (2019).
