= Ralph Maxwell (athlete) =

American judge and athlete

Ralph "Buzzy" Bernard Borden Maxwell (November 26, 1919 – September 28, 2014) was a jurist and athlete.

== Education and legal career ==
Born in Devils Lake, North Dakota, Maxwell went to Rolla High School. He then received his bachelor's degree from University of North Dakota and his law degree from the University of North Dakota School of Law. Maxwell served as state's attorney for Rolette County, North Dakota and as United States attorney for the United States District Court for North Dakota. From 1958 until 1967, Maxwell practiced law in West Fargo, North Dakota. On August 1, 1967, Maxwell was appointed North Dakota state district court judge for the first district by the Governor of North Dakota, William L. Guy and served until his retirement from the position in 1978. Maxwell died at his summer residence in Richville, Minnesota on September 29, 2014.

== Athletic career ==
After retiring, Maxwell applied some of his efforts to the sport of Masters athletics where, as a 90-year-old, he has set numerous world records in the 80-meter hurdles, the 200 meters hurdles, the pole vault, pentathlon and decathlon. His decathlon score, set in the 2011 World Masters Athletics Championships in Sacramento, California in July 2011 more than doubled the previous record score by Vic Younger of Australia. He is one of but a handful of 90-year-olds to even attempt to run over hurdles.
