= 2022 in the sport of athletics =

2022 in athletics was a year highlighted by an unusual number of significant athletics events. The delayed 2020 Olympic program led to the 2021 World Athletics Championships being rearranged for 2022, while events normally held in the middle years of Olympic cycles, such as the Commonwealth Games athletics program and the various continental championships (e.g. the 2022 European Athletics Championships) were also held, meaning significant numbers of athletes had several peaks in quick succession, particularly Canadian, British, Australian, Kenyan and South African athletes.

== World records ==
=== Indoor ===
Event	Perf.	N	Athlete(s)	Nat.	Date	Meeting	Location	Ctry.	R	V	P
Men's 1500 m	3:30.60		Jakob Ingebrigtsen	NOR	17 Feb 2022	Meeting Hauts-de-France Pas-de-Calais	Liévin	FRA			
Men's 60 m hurdles	7.29		Grant Holloway	USA	20 Mar 2022	World Championships	Belgrade	SRB			P
Men's Pole vault	6.19 m		Armand Duplantis	SWE	7 Mar 2022		Belgrade	SRB			P
Men's Pole vault	6.20 m		Armand Duplantis	SWE	20 Mar 2022		Belgrade	SRB			P
Women's Triple jump	15.74 m		Yulimar Rojas	VEN	20 Mar 2022	World Championships	Belgrade	SRB			
Women's Distance medley relay	10:33.85	(Note: Leg 1 (1200m) Heather McLean 3:14.92 Leg 2 (400m) Kendall Ellis 52.04 Leg 3 (800m) Roisin Willis 2:03.29 Leg 4 (1600m) Elle Purrier St. Pierre 4:23.60)	Heather McLean; Kendall Ellis; Roisin Willis; Elle Purrier St. Pierre	USA	15 Apr 2022	A Night at the TRACK; Presented by New Balance Running	Boston	USA			

=== Outdoor ===
Event	Perf.	W	N	Athlete(s)	Nat.	Date	Meeting	Location	Ctry.	R	V	P
Men's Marathon	2:01:09			Eliud Kipchoge	KEN	25 Sep 2022	Berlin Marathon	Berlin	GER			P
Men's 50 km (road)	2:40:13			Stephen Mokoka	RSA	6 Mar 2022	Nedbank Runified 50km	Gqeberha	RSA			
Men's 50 km (road)	2:38:43			CJ Albertson	USA	8 Oct 2022	Ruth Anderson Memorial Endurance Run	San Francisco	USA			
Men's Pole vault	6.21 m			Armand Duplantis	SWE	24 Jul 2022	World Championships	Eugene	USA			P
Women's 10 km (road)	29:14		Mx	Yalemzerf Yehualaw	ETH	27 Feb 2022	World Athletics Label road race	Castellón de la Plana	ESP			P
Women's 100 m hurdles	12.12	+0.9		Tobi Amusan	NGR	24 Jul 2022	World Championships	Eugene	USA			P
Women's 400 m hurdles	51.41			Sydney McLaughlin	USA	25 Jun 2022	USATF Outdoor Championships	Eugene	USA			P
Women's 400 m hurdles	50.68			Sydney McLaughlin	USA	22 Jul 2022	World Championships	Eugene	USA			P

== World Athletics Series ==
- March 4 & 5: 2022 World Athletics Race Walking Team Championships in (Oman) Muscat
  - 10 km: (China) Wang Hongren (m) / (China) Jiang Yunyan (f)
  - 20 km: (Japan) Toshikazu Yamanishi (m) / (China) Ma Zhenxia (f)
  - 35 km: (Sweden) Perseus Karlström (m) / (Ecuador) Glenda Morejón (f)
- March 12: 2022 FISU Cross Country Championships in (Portugal) Leiria
  - XC 10 km: (Uganda) Dismas Yeko (m) / (Ecuador) Glenda Morejón (f)
- March 18–20: 2022 World Athletics Indoor Championships in (Serbia) Belgrade
  - 60 metres: (Italy) Marcell Jacobs (m) / (Switzerland) Mujinga Kambundji (f)
  - 400 metres: (Trinidad and Tobago) Jereem Richards (m) / (The Bahamas) Shaunae Miller-Uibo (f)
  - 800 metres: (Spain) Mariano García (m) / (United States) Ajeé Wilson (f)
  - 1500 metres: (Ethiopia) Samuel Tefera (m) / (Ethiopia) Gudaf Tsegay (f)
  - 3000 metres: (Ethiopia) Selemon Barega (m) / (Ethiopia) Lemlem Hailu (f)
  - 60 metres hurdles: (United States) Grant Holloway (m) / (France) Cyréna Samba-Mayela (f)
  - 4 × 400 metres relay: Belgium (m) / Jamaica (f)
  - High jump: (South Korea) Woo Sang-hyeok (m) / (Ukraine) Yaroslava Mahuchikh (f)
  - Pole vault: (Sweden) Armand Duplantis (m) / (United States) Sandi Morris (f)
  - Long jump: (Greece) Miltiadis Tentoglou (m) / (Serbia) Ivana Vuleta (f)
  - Triple jump: (Cuba) Lázaro Martínez (m) / (Venezuela) Yulimar Rojas (f)
  - Shot put: (Brazil) Darlan Romani (m) / (Portugal) Auriol Dongmo (f)
- June 30 – July 5: 2021 Summer World University Games in (China) Chengdu
- July 15–24: 2022 World Athletics Championships in (United States) Eugene
- August 1–6: 2022 World Athletics U20 Championships in (Colombia) Cali
- November 13: 2022 World Athletics Half Marathon Championships in (China) Yangzhou

== Areas, Regional and Continental Championships ==
- February 5 & 6: South American Race Walking Championships in (Peru) Lima
  - 35 km winners: (Peru) Luis Henry Campos (m) / (Ecuador) Paola Pérez (f)
  - 20 km winners: (Peru) César Rodríguez (m) / (Ecuador) Glenda Morejón (f)
- February 6: European Champion Clubs Cup Cross Country in (Portugal) Oeiras
  - Winners: (Burundi) Rodrigue Kwizera (m) / (Ethiopia) Likina Amebaw (f)
  - U20 winners: (Republic of Ireland) Dean Casey (m) / (Finland) Ilona Mononen (f)
  - Team winners: (Turkey) Ankara Ego (Polat Kemboi Arıkan, Yemane Haileselassie, İlham Tanui Özbilen, Üzeyir Söylemez) (m) / (Spain) CA Playas de Castellón (Likina Amebaw, Blanca Fernández, Cristina Espejo, Clara Viñaras) (f)
  - Team U20 winners: (Republic of Ireland) Ennis Track AC (Dean Casey, Dylan Casey, Niall Murphy, Mark Hanrahan) (m) / (Romania) AC Mica Romă (Iulia Mărginean, Alexandra Hudea, Mihaela Blaga, Andrea Bogdan) (f)
- February 13: Oceania Open 20 km Race Walking Championships in (Australia) Adelaide
  - Winners: (Australia) Declan Tingay (m) / (Australia) Jemima Montag (f)
- February 19 & 20: 2022 South American Indoor Championships in Athletics in Cochabamba
  - 60 metres: (Brazil) Felipe Bardi dos Santos (m) / (Brazil) Rosângela Santos (f)
  - 400 metres: (Brazil) Lucas Carvalho (m) / (Brazil) Tábata de Carvalho (f)
  - 800 metres: (Venezuela) Lucirio Antonio Garrido (m) / (Uruguay) Deborah Rodríguez (f)
  - 1500 metres: (Bolivia) David Ninavia (m) / (Bolivia) Jhoselyn Camargo (f)
  - 3000 metres: (Bolivia) Daniel Toroya (m) / (Bolivia) Lizeth Veizaga (f)
  - 60 metres hurdles: (Brazil) Rafael Pereira (m) / (Brazil) Ketiley Batista (f)
  - 4 × 400 metres relay:Venezuela (m) / Bolivia (f)
  - High jump: (Brazil) Thiago Moura (m) / (Brazil) Sarah Freitas (f)
  - Pole vault: (Brazil) Augusto Dutra de Oliveira (m) / (Brazil) Isabel de Quadros (f)
  - Long jump: (Peru) José Luis Mandros (m) / (Panama) Nathalee Aranda (f)
  - Triple jump: (Brazil) Alexsandro Melo (m) / (Brazil) Gabriele dos Santos (f)
  - Shot put: (Brazil) Darlan Romani (m) / (Brazil) Livia Avancini (f)
  - Heptathlon: (Brazil) Felipe Vinícius dos Santos (m)
  - Pentathlon: (Brazil) Raiane Procópio
- February 20: 2022 Central American Race Walking Championship in (El Salvador) San Salvador
  - 20 km winners: (Guatemala) Érick Barrondo (m) / (Guatemala) Yasury Palacios (f)
- March 5: 2022 Balkan Indoor Championships in (Turkey) Istanbul
  - 60 m winners: (Turkey) Kayhan Özer (m) / (Cyprus) Olivia Fotopoulou (f)
  - 400 m winners: (Turkey) Ilyas Çanakçi (m) / (Slovenia) Anita Horvat (f)
  - 800 m winners: (Bosnia and Herzegovina) Abedin Mujezinović (m) / (Turkey) Tuğba Toptaš (f)
  - 1500 m winners: (Turkey) Mehmet Çelík (m) / (Turkey) Šilan Ayyildiz (f)
  - 3000 m winners: (Slovenia) Vid Botolin (m) / (Albania) Luiza Gega (f)
  - 60 m Hurdles winners: (Romania) Alin Ionuț Anton (m) / (Romania) Anamaria Nesteriuc (f)
  - High Jump winners: (Serbia) Božidar Marković (m) / (Bulgaria) Mirela Demireva (f)
  - Pole Vault winners: (Austria) Riccardo Klotz (m) / (Greece) Eleni-Klaoudia Polak (f)
  - Long Jump winners: (Albania) İzmir Smajlaj (m) / (Greece) Vasiliki Chaitidou (f)
  - Triple Jump winners: (Armenia) Levon Aghasyan (m) / (Turkey) Tuğba Danișmaz (f)
  - Shot put winners: (Georgia (country)) Giorgi Mujaridze (m) / (Turkey) Pinar Akyol (f)
  - 4 × 400 m winners: (Romania) (Remus Niculita, Mihai Dringo, Denis Toma, Robert Parge) (m) / (Slovenia) (Agata Zupin, Jerneja Smonkar, Veronika Sadek, Anita Horvat) (f)
- February 15: Banskobystricka latka in (Slovakia) Banská Bystrica
  - High Jump winners: (South Korea) Sanghyeok Woo (m) / (Australia) Eleanor Patterson (f)
- March 27: 2022 Pan American Cross Country Cup in (Brazil) Serra
- April 16 – 18: 2022 RIFTA Games in (Jamaica) Kingston
- May 14 – 15: 2022 NACAC Combined Events Championship (Canada) Ottawa
- May 15: 2022 Oceania Open 35 km Race Walking Championship (Australia) Melbourne
- May 22: 2022 South American Marathon Championships (Paraguay) Asunción
- June 8–12: 2022 African Athletics Championships in (Mauritius) St. Pierre
- June 11: 2022 Championships of the Small States of Europe in (Malta) Marsa
- June 29 – July 3: 2022 Caribbean Games (U23) in (France) Guadeloupe
- July 1–4: XIX Mediterranean Games (Athletics) in (Algeria) Oran
- July 4–7: 2022 European Athletics U18 Championships in (Israel) Jerusalem
- August 15–21: 2022 European Athletics Championships in (Germany) Munich
- August 16–22: 19th Asian Games in (China) Hangzhou
- August 19–21: 2022 NACAC Championships in (The Bahamas) Nassau
- August 21: 2022 South American Half Marathon Championships (Argentina) Buenos Aires
- September 9–11: 2022 South American Athletics U18 Championships (Brazil) São Paulo
- September 30 – October 2: 2022 South American Athletics U23 Championships in (Brazil) Cascavel
- October 12–15: 2022 South American Games in (Paraguay) Asunción
- TBA: 4th Asian U18 Athletics Championships in Al-Kuwait

== 2022 World Athletics Label Road Races ==
Elite Platinum

- March 6: Tokyo Marathon in (Japan) Tokyo
  - Winners: (Kenya) Eliud Kipchoge (m) / (Kenya) Brigid Kosgei (f)
- March 13: Nagoya Women's Marathon in (Japan) Nagoya (Only women's)
  - Winners: (Kenya) Ruth Chepngetich
- April 10: C&D Xiamen Marathon in (China) Xiamen
- April 17: Seoul Marathon in (South Korea) Seoul
- April 18: Boston Marathon in (United States) Boston

Elite

- January 16: Houston Half Marathon in (United States) Houston
  - Winners: (Ethiopia) Milkesa Mengesha (m) / (Kenya) Vicoty Chepngeno (f)
- January 16: Houston Marathon in (United States) Houston
  - Winners: (Kenya) James Ngandu (m) / (United States) Keira D'Amato (f)
- January 30: Osaka International Ladies Marathon in (Japan) Osaka
  - Winner: (Japan) Mizuki Matsuda
- February 12: Lagos City Marathon in (Nigeria) Lagos
  - Winners: (Ethiopia) Dagne Siranesh Yirga (m) / (Ethiopia) Ulfata Gelata (f)
- February 19: Ras Al Khaimah Half Marathon in (United Arab Emirates) Ras Al Khaimah
  - Winners: (Uganda) Jacob Kiplimo (m) / (Ethiopia) Girmawit Gebrzihair (f)
- February 20: Sevilla Marathon in (Spain) Sevilla
  - Winners: (Ethiopia) Asrar Abderehman (m) / (Ethiopia) Alemu Megertu (f)
- February 20: XXXVI Medio Maraton Internacional Guadalajara Electrolit in (Mexico) Guadalajara
  - Winners: (Kenya) Rhonzai Lokitam Kilimo (m) / (Ethiopia) Besu Sado (f)
- February 27: The Combined 10th Osaka Marathon and 77th Lake Biwa Marathon in (Japan) Osaka
  - Winners: (Japan) Gaku Hoshi (m) / (Japan) Misato Horie (f)
- March 5: Riyadh Marathon in (Saudi Arabia) Riyadh
  - Winners: (Ethiopia) Tsegaye Getachew (m) / (Ethiopia) Tadu Teshome (f)
- March 6: Nedbank #Runified 50 km in (South Africa) Gqeberha
  - Winner: (South Africa) Stephen Mokoka
- Cancelled: Marathon International de Rabat in (Morocco) Rabat
- Postponed: Xuzhou Marathon in (China) Xuzhou
- March 20: New Taipei City Wan Jin Shi Marathon in (Chinese Taipei) New Taipei City
  - Winners: (Kenya) Felix Kimutai (m) / (Ethiopia) Motu Megersa (f)
- March 27: N Kolay Istanbul Half Marathon in (Turkey) Istanbul
- TBD: Mumbai Marathon in (India) Mumbai

Label

- January 9: 10K Valencia Ibercaja in (Spain) Valencia
  - Winners: (Kenya) Daniel Ebenyo (m) / (Kenya) Norah Jeruto (f)
- January 22: Buriram Marathon in (Thailand) Buriram
  - Winners: (Russia) Sergey Zyryanov (m) / (Russia) Aleksandra Morozova (f)
- January 23: XXX Mitja Marató Internacional Vila de Santa Pola in (Spain) Santa Pola
  - Winners: (Kenya) Felix Kibitok (m) / (Kenya) Pauline Esikon (f)
- February 25: Tel Aviv Marathon in Israel
  - Winners: (Kenya) Vincent Kipsang Rono (m) / (Israel) Mentamir Bikayia (f)
- February 26: Amazing Thailand 10k Bangkok in Bangkok
  - Winner: (Poland) Krzysztof Hadas
- February 27: Napoli City Half Marathon in (Italy) Naples
  - Winners: (Italy) Yemaneberhan Crippa (m) / (Kenya) Gladys Chepkurui (f)
- February 27: Amazing Thailand Marathon Bangkok in Bangkok
  - Winners: (Kenya) David Kibet (m) / Aleksandra Morozova (f)
- February 27: Maratón BP Castellón in (Spain) Castellón
  - Winners: (Kenya) Ronald Korir (m) / (Kenya) Betty Jepleting (f)
- February 27: Amazing Thailand Half Marathon Bangkok in Bangkok
  - Winners: (Thailand) Nattawut Innum (m) / (Thailand) Aoranuch Aiamtas (f)
- March 5: Riyadh Half Marathon in (Saudi Arabia) Riyadh
  - Winners: (Kenya) Geofry Toroitich (m) / (Kenya) Daisy Cherotich (f)
- March 6: RomaOstia Half Marathon in (Italy) Roma
  - Winners: (Kenya) Sabastian Kimaru Sawe (m) / (Kenya) Irine Jepchumba Kimais (f)
- March 26: Azkoitia Azpeitia Diego Garcia Memorial in (Spain) Azpeitia
- March 27: Run Rome The Marathon in (Italy) Roma
- March 27: Tashkent International Marathon in (Uzbekistan) Tashkent
- March 27: Kiss-Run Pukou Women's Half Marathon in (China) Nanjing
- March 27: Zagreb 21 powered by Heineken 0,0 in (Croatia) Zagreb
- TBD: Zheng-Kai International Marathon in (China) Zhengzhou
- Postponed Suzhou Jinji Lake International Half Marathon in (China) Suzhou

== 2022 World Athletics Continental Tour ==
Bronze

- February 20: Sir Graeme Douglas International in (New Zealand) Auckland
  - 100 m winners: (New Zealand) Lex Revell-Lewis (m) / (New Zealand) Zoe Hobbs (f)
  - 400 m winners: (New Zealand) James Ford (m) / (New Zealand) Rosie Elliot (f)
  - 1500 m winners: (New Zealand) Julian Oakley (m) / (New Zealand) Laura Nagel (f)
  - Men's 5000 m winner: (New Zealand) Hayden Wilde
  - Women's 400 m hurdles winner: (New Zealand) Portia Bing
  - Discus Throw winners: (New Zealand) Connor Bell (m) / (New Zealand) Savannah Scheen (f)
  - Hammer Throw winners: (New Zealand) Anthony Nobilo (m) / (New Zealand) Lauren Bruce (f)
  - High Jump winners: (New Zealand) Hamish Kerr (m) / (New Zealand) Keeley O'hagan (f)
  - Men's Long Jump winners: (New Zealand) Felix McDonald
  - Pole Vault winners: (New Zealand) Nicholas Southgate (m) / (New Zealand) Olivia McTaggart (f)
  - Shot Put winners: (New Zealand) Tom Walsh (m) / (New Zealand) Maddison-Lee Wesche (f)
  - Women's Javelin Throw winner: (New Zealand) Tori Peeters
- February 26: International Track Meet in (New Zealand) Christchurch
  - 200 m winners: (New Zealand) Tiaan Whelpton (m) / (New Zealand) Katherine Camp (f)
  - Mile winners: (New Zealand) Hayden Wilde (m) / (New Zealand) Penelope Salmon (f)
  - Men's 110 m hurdles winners: (New Zealand) Joshua Hawkins
  - Women's 100 m hurdles winner: (New Zealand) Maggie Jones
  - Discus Throw winners: (New Zealand) Kieran Fowler (m) / (New Zealand) Tatiana Kaumoana (f)
  - Hammer Throw winners: (New Zealand) Anthony Nobilo (m) / (New Zealand) Lauren Bruce (f)
  - High Jump winners: (New Zealand) Hamish Kerr (m) / (New Zealand) Keeley O'hagan (f)
  - Triple Jump winners: (New Zealand) Scott Thompson (m) / (New Zealand) Anna Thompson (f)
  - Shot Put winners: (New Zealand) Tom Walsh (m) / (New Zealand) Tapenisa Havea (f)
- February 26: Sydney Track Classic in (Australia) Sydney
  - 60 metres: (New Zealand) Edward Osei-Nketia (m) / (Australia) Abbie Taddeo (f)
  - 100 metres: (New Zealand) Edward Osei-Nketia (m) / (Australia) Ella Connolly (f)
  - 400 metres: (Australia) Alex Beck (m) / (Australia) Ella Connolly (f)
  - 800 metres: (Australia) Peter Bol (m) / (Australia) Bendere Oboya (f)
  - 3000 metres: (Australia) Jude Thomas (m) / (Australia) Rosa Davies (f)
  - Men's 110 metres hurdles: (Australia) Nicholas Hough
  - Women's 100 metres hurdles: (Australia) Liz Clay
  - Women's 400 metres hurdles: (New Zealand) Portia Bing
  - High jump: (Australia) Joel Baden (m) / (New Zealand) Keeley O'Hagan (f)
  - Pole vault: (Australia) Dalton Di Medio (m) / (Australia) Courtney Smallacombe (f)
  - Triple jump: (Australia) Ayo Ore (m) / (Australia) Desleigh Owushu (f)
  - Women's Shot Put: (Australia) Sally Shokry
  - Discus Throw: (Australia) Matthew Denny / (Australia) Jade Lally (f)
  - Harmer Throw: (Australia) Ned Weatherly (m) / (Australia) Alexandra Hulley (f)
- March 19: Melbourne Track Classic in Melbourne
  - 100 m winners: (Australia) Jacob Despard (m) / (Australia) Celeste Mucci (f)
  - 200 m winners: (Australia) Calab Law (m) / (Australia) Ella Connolly (f)
  - Men's 800 m winners: (New Zealand) James Preston
  - 1500 m winners: (Australia) Thomas Thorpe (m) / (Australia) Abbey Caldwell (f)
  - 400 m hurdles winners: (Australia) Mark Fokas (m) / (New Zealand) Portia Bing (f)
  - 3000 m steeplechase winners: (Japan) Kosei Yamaguchi (m) / (Australia) Brielle Erbacher (f)
  - Long Jump winners: (Australia) Christopher Mitrevski (m) / (Australia) Samantha Dale (f)
  - Men's Shot Put winner: (Australia) Damien Birkinhead
  - Javelin Throw winner: (Australia) Cameron Mcentyre (m) / (Australia) Mackenzie Little (f)
  - 4 × 100 m winners: Australia) (m) / Australia (f)

Challenger

- January 22: Potts Classic in (New Zealand) Hastings
  - 100 m winners: (New Zealand) Tiaan Whelpton (m) / (New Zealand) Zoe Hobbs (f)
  - 800 m winners: (New Zealand) James Preston (m) / (New Zealand) Rebekah Greene (f)
  - 3000 m winners: (New Zealand) Sam Tanner (m) / (New Zealand) Kara MacDermid (f)
  - Discus Throw winners: (New Zealand) Connor Bell (m) / (New Zealand) Savannah Scheen (f)
  - Hammer Throw winners: (New Zealand) Anthony Nobilo (m) / (New Zealand) Lauren Bruce (f)
  - Long Jump winners: (New Zealand) Angus Lyver (m) / (New Zealand) Mariah Ririnui (f)
  - Pole Vault winners: (New Zealand) James Steyn (m) / (New Zealand) Olivia McTaggart (f)
  - Shot Put winners: (New Zealand) Tom Walsh (m) / (New Zealand) Valerie Adams (f)
- January 26: Zátopek Classic in (Australia) Melbourne
  - 800 m winners: (Australia) Tom March (m) / (Australia) Catriona Bisset (f)
  - 1500 m winners: (Australia) Luke Young (m) / (Australia) Claudia Hollingsworth (f)
  - 10000 m winners: (Australia) Jack Rayner (m) / (Australia) Rose Davies (f)
  - Pole Vault winners: (Australia) Dalton Di Medio (m) / (Australia) Cassidy Bradshaw (f)
  - Long Jump winners: (Australia) Amiru Chandrasena (m) / (Australia) Chloe Grenade (f)
- January 30: Cooks Classic in (New Zealand) Whanganui
  - 200 m winners: (New Zealand) Zachary Saunders (m) / (New Zealand) Georgia Hulls (f)
  - 400 m winners: (New Zealand) Joshua Ledger (m) / (New Zealand) Izzy Neal (f)
  - Men's 800 m winner: (New Zealand) James Preston
  - Women's 400 m Hurdles winner: (New Zealand) Alessandra Macdonald
  - High Jump winners: (New Zealand) Hamish Kerr (m) / (New Zealand) Keeley O'Hagan (f)
  - Women's Hammer Throw winner: (New Zealand) Lauren Bruce
  - Javelin Throw winners: (New Zealand) Jared Neighbours (m) / (New Zealand) Tori Peeters (f)
  - Triple Jump winners: (New Zealand) Scott Thomson (m) / (New Zealand) Anna Thomson (f)
  - Shot Put winners: (New Zealand) Tom Walsh (m) / (New Zealand) Lauren Bruce (f)
- February 4: Capital Classic in (New Zealand) Wellington
  - 200 m winners: (New Zealand) Zachary Saunders (m) / (New Zealand) Georgia Hulls (f)
  - Women's 800 m winner: (New Zealand) Holly Manning
  - 1500 m winners: (New Zealand) Julian Oakley (m) / (New Zealand) Laura Nagel (f)
  - Men's 110 m Hurdles winner: (New Zealand) Tom Moloney
  - Women's 100 m Hurdles winner: (New Zealand) Amy Robertson
  - Men's 3000 m Steeplechase winner: (New Zealand) George Guerin
  - High Jump winners: (New Zealand) Marcus Wolton (m) / (New Zealand) Keeley O'Hagan (f)
  - Long Jump winners: (New Zealand) Felix McDonald (m) / (New Zealand) Ashleigh Bennett (f)
  - Triple Jump winners: (New Zealand) Scott Thomson (m) / (New Zealand) Anna Thomson (f)
  - Hammer Throw winners: (New Zealand) Anthony Nobilo (m) / (New Zealand) Lauren Bruce
  - Javelin Throw winner: (New Zealand) Jared Neighbours (m) / (New Zealand) Tori Peeters (f)
  - Shot Put winners: (New Zealand) Tom Walsh (m) / (New Zealand) Tapenisa Havea (f)
- February 5: Sola Power Throws Meet in (New Zealand) Wellington
  - Discus Throw winners: (Samoa) Nathaniel Sulupo (m) / (New Zealand) Tatiana Kaumoana (f)
  - Shot Put winners: (New Zealand) Blessing Sefo (m) / (New Zealand) Tapenisa Havea (f)
- February 12: Adelaide Track Classic in (Australia) Adelaide
  - 100 m winners: (Australia) Rohan Browning (m) / (Australia) Ella Connolly (f)
  - 200 m winners: (Australia) Aidan Murphy (m) / (Australia) Riley Day (f)
  - 800 m winners: (Australia) Peter Bol (m) / (Australia) Bendere Oboya (f)
  - 5000 m winners: (Australia) Sam McEntee (m) / (Australia) Isobel Batt-Doyle (f)
  - 3000 m Steeplechase winners: (Australia) Ben Buckingham (m) / (Australia) Cara Feain-Ryan (f)
  - Women's Pole Vault winner: (Australia) Courtney Smallacombe
  - Triple Jump winners: (Australia) Julian Konle (m) / (Australia) Desleigh Owusu (f)
  - Men's Discus Throw winner: (Australia) Lachlan Page
- March 16: ASA Athletics Grand Prix 1 in (South Africa) Bloemfontein
  - 100 m winners: (South Africa) Jarryd Crossman (m) / (South Africa) Yave Collins (f)
  - 400 m winners: (South Africa) Oratile Setlhabi (m) / (South Africa) Anname Fourie (f)
  - 800 m winners: (South Africa) Jabulane Ncamane (m) / (South Africa) Danielle Verster (f)
  - Men's 110 metre hurdles winner: (South Africa) Antonio Alkana
  - Women's 100 metre hurdles winner: (South Africa) Marione Fourie
  - Long Jump winners: (South Africa) Jovan Van Vuuren (m) / (South Africa) Lene Peens (f)
  - Men's Shot Put winner: (South Africa) Jason Van Rooyen
  - Men's Harmer Throw winner: (South Africa) Allan Cumming
  - Women's Discus Throw winner: (South Africa) Yolandi Stander
- March 17–19: 16th Annual Spring Break Classic in Carolina
  - 100 m winners: (United States) Donatien Djero (m) / (British Virgin Islands) Kenyatta Grate (f)
  - 200 m winners: (The Bahamas) Steven Gardiner (m) / (Puerto Rico) Jasmine Camacho-Quinn (f)
  - Men's 300 m winner: (United States) Andrew Hudson
  - 400 m winners: (United States) Nicardo Blake (m) / (United States) Imani Gray (f)
  - 800 m winners: (Puerto Rico) Derick Ortega (m) / (United States) Tessa McClain (f)
  - 1500 m winners: (Puerto Rico) Hector Pagan (m) / (Argentina) Carolina Lozano (f)
  - 5000 m winners: (Puerto Rico) Samuel Morales (m) / (Puerto Rico) Jorelis Vargas (f)
  - Men's 110 metre hurdles winner: (Puerto Rico) Angel Ruiz
  - Women's 100 metre hurdles winner: (Puerto Rico) Paola Vazquez
  - 400 m hurdles winners: (Puerto Rico) Angel Ruiz (m) / (Puerto Rico) Grace Claxton (f)
  - High Jump winners: (Puerto Rico) Luis Castro Rivera (m) / (United States) Dominique Biron (f)
  - Pole Vault winners: (Puerto Rico) Gabriel Cumba (m) / (United States) Viviana Quintana (f)
  - Long Jump winners: (Puerto Rico) Shawn Díaz (m) / (Puerto Rico) Paola Fernandez (f)
  - Triple Jump winners: (Colombia) Andres Felipe Murillo (m) / (Colombia) Yuli Andrea Quinto (f)
  - Shot Put winner: (Puerto Rico) Josean Diaz (m) / (United States Virgin Islands) Maia Campbell (f)
  - Harmer Throw winner: (Puerto Rico) Jerome Vega (m) / (Jamaica) Erica Belvit (f)
  - Javelin Throw winner: (Colombia) Arley Ibargüen (m) / (Puerto Rico) Coralys Ortiz (f)
  - 4 × 100 m winners: International Team (Barbados/United States/Jamaica/Bahamas) (m) / United States (f)
  - 4 × 400 m winners: British Virgin Islands (m) / International Team (United States/Puerto Rico) (f)

== 2022 World Athletics Combined Events Tour ==
Bronze

- December 18–19, 2021: Oceania Combined Events Championships in (Australia) Brisbane
  - Men's Decathlon winner: (Australia) Daniel Golubovic
  - Women's Heptathlon winner: (Australia) Taneille Crase
- January 29 & 30: X-Athletics in (France) Aubière
  - Men's Heptathlon winner: (Switzerland) Simon Ehammer
  - Women's Pentathlon winner: (Poland) Adrianna Sułek
- February 5 & 6: Tallinn Indoor Meeting in (Estonia) Tallinn
  - Men's Heptathlon winner: (Estonia) Hans-Christian Hausenberg
  - Women's Pentathlon winner: (Poland) Adrianna Sułek

== 2022 World Athletics Indoor Tour ==
Gold

- January 28: INIT Indoor Meeting Karlsruhe in (Germany) Karlsruhe
  - Women's 60 m winner: (Spain) María Isabel Pérez
  - Women's 400 m winner: (Poland) Anna Kiełbasińska
  - 800 winners: (United Kingdom) Elliot Giles (m) / (Uganda) Halimah Nakaayi (f)
  - Women's 1500 m winner: (Ethiopia) Axumawit Embaye
  - Men's 3000 winner: (Ethiopia) Berihu Aregawi
  - 60 m Hurdles winners: (France) Pascal Martinot-Lagarde (m) / (Jamaica) Danielle Williams (f)
  - Men's Pole Vault winner: (Sweden) Armand Duplantis
  - Women's High Jump winner: (United Kingdom) Emily Borthwick
  - Men's Long Jump winner: (Sweden) Thobias Montler
  - Men's Triple Jump winner: (Greece) Andreas Pantazis
- January 29: Millrose Games in (United States) New York City
  - Men's 60 m winner: (United States) Christian Coleman
  - Women's 400 m winner: (United States) Wadeline Jonathas
  - Men's 800 m winner: (United States) Bryce Hoppel
  - Men's 3000 m winner: (New Zealand) Geordie Beamish
  - Women's 60 m Hurdles winner: (Jamaica) Britany Anderson
  - Women's Long Jump winner: (United States) Tara Davis
- February 6: New Balance Indoor Grand Prix in (United States) New York City
  - 60 m winners: (United States) Noah Lyles (m) / (United States) Mikiah Brisco (f)
  - Men's 200 m winner: (United States) Trayvon Bromell
  - Women's 300 m winner: (United States) Gabrielle Thomas
  - 400 m winners: (Trinidad and Tobago) Jereem Richards (m) / (United States) Jessica Beard (f)
  - 800 m winners: (Spain) Mariano García (m) / (Jamaica) Natoya Goule (f)
  - 1500 m winners: (United States) Colby Alexander (m) / (Spain) Esther Guerrero
  - 3000 m winners: (Spain) Adel Mechaal (m) / (Canada) Gabriela DeBues-Stafford (f)
  - Men's 1 mile winner: (Republic of Ireland) Andrew Coscoran
  - 60 m Hurdles winners: (United States) Grant Holloway (m) / (Jamaica) Danielle Williams (f)
  - Women's Long Jump winner: (United Kingdom) Lorraine Ugen
  - Men's Triple Jump winner: (United States) Donald Scott
- February 17: Meeting Hauts-de-France Pas-de-Calais in Liévin
  - Men's 60 m winners: (Italy) Marcell Jacobs
  - 800 m winners: (Spain) Mariano García (m) / (Jamaica) Natoya Goule (f)
  - Women's 1 mile winner: (Ethiopia) Gudaf Tsegay
  - Men's 1500 m winners: (Norway) Jakob Ingebrisgtsen
  - Men's 2000 m winners: (Ethiopia) Samuel Zeleke
  - 3000 m winners: (Ethiopia) Lamecha Girma (m) / (Ethiopia) Dawit Seyaum (f)
  - 60 m hurdles winner: (United States) Grant Holloway (m) / (France) Laeticia Bapté (f)
  - Pole Vault winner: (United States) Christopher Nielsen (m) / Anzhelika Sidorova (f)
  - Women's Long Jump winner: (Venezuela) Yulimar Rojas
  - Men's Triple Jump winner: (Cuba) Lázaro Martínez
- February 19: Birmingham Indoor Grand Prix in (United Kingdom) Birmingham
  - 60 m winners: (United States) Noah Liles (m) / (Jamaica) Elaine Thompson (f)
  - 400 m winners: (United States) Kahmari Montgomery (m) / (Jamaica) Stephenie Ann McPherson (f)
  - 800 m winners: (Kenya) Collins Kipruto (m) / (United Kingdom) Keely Hodgkinson (f)
  - 1500 m winners: (Kenya) Abel Kipsang (m) / (Ethiopia) Dawit Seyaum
  - 60 m Hurdles winners: (United States) Grant Holloway (m) / (Netherlands) Zoë Sedney (f)
  - Men's Pole Vault winner: (Sweden) Armand Duplantis
  - Women's High Jump winner: (Australia) Eleanor Patterson
  - Women's Triple Jump winner: (Sweden) Khaddi Sagnia
- February 22: Copernicus Cup in (Poland) Toruń
  - 60 m winners: (United States) Elijah Hall (m) / (Poland) Ewa Swoboda (f)
  - Women's 400 m winner: (Netherlands) Femke Bol
  - 800 m winners: (United Kingdom) Elliot Giles (m) / (Australia) Catriona Bisset (f)
  - Women's 1500 m winners: (Ethiopia) Gudaf Tsegay
  - Men's 3000 m winners: (Ethiopia) Lamecha Girma
  - 60 m Hurdles winners: (Poland) Damian Czykier (m) / (The Bahamas) Devynne Charlton (f)
  - Men's Pole Vault winner: (Philippines) Ernest John Obiena
  - Women's Long Jump winner: (Sweden) Khaddi Sagnia
  - Men's Shot put winner: (Croatia) Filip Mihaljević
- March 2: World Indoor Tour Madrid in Spain
  - Men's 60 m winners: (United States) Elijah Hall
  - Women's 400 m winner: (Poland) Justyna Święty-Ersetic
  - 800 m winners: (United Kingdom) Elliot Giles (m) / (Australia) Catriona Bisset (f)
  - Women's 1500 m winners: (Ethiopia) Gudaf Tsegay
  - Men's 3000 m winners: (Ethiopia) Selemon Barega
  - 60 m Hurdles winners: (Spain) Asier Martínez (m) / (Netherlands) Zoë Sedney (f)
  - Women's High Jump winner: (Australia) Elleanor Patterson
  - Triple Jump winners: (Cuba) Lázaro Martínez (m) / (Venezuela) Yulimar Rojas (f)
  - Women's Long Jump winner: (United Kingdom) Lorraine Ugan
  - Men's Shot put winner: (Poland) Konrad Bukowiecki

Silver

- January 22: Manchester World Indoor Tour in (United Kingdom) Manchester
  - 60 m winners: (United Kingdom) Andrew Robertson (m) / (United Kingdom) Amy Hunt (f)
  - Men's 400 m winner: (United Kingdom) Edward Faulds
  - 800 m winners: (United Kingdom) Ben Greenwood (m) / (United Kingdom) Isabelle Boffey (f)
  - 1500 m winners: (United Kingdom) Piers Copeland (m) / (Romania) Claudia Bobocea (f)
  - 3000 m winners: (Qatar) Mohamad Al-Garni (m) / (Republic of Ireland) Ciara Mageean (f)
  - 60 m Hurdles winners: (Netherlands) Koen Smet (m) / (Republic of Ireland) Sarah Lavin (f)
  - Women's Pole Vault winner: (United Kingdom) Sophie Cook
  - Men's High Jump winner: (Switzerland) Loïc Gasch
  - Women's Long Jump winner: (United Kingdom) Lucy Hadaway
  - Shot Put winners: (United Kingdom) Scott Lincoln (m) / (United Kingdom) Sophie McKinna (f)
- January 30: Hvězdy v Nehvizdech in (Czech Republic) Nehvizdy
  - High Jump winners: (Belgium) Thomas Carmoy (m) / (Ukraine) Yuliya Chumachenko (f)
  - Shot Put winners: (Czech Republic) Tomáš Staněk (m) / (Germany) Sara Gambetta (f)
- February 3: Czech Indoor Gala in (Czech Republic) Ostrava
  - 60 m winners: (Czech Republic) Jan Veleba (m) / (Republic of Ireland) Molly Scott (f)
  - Men's 200 m winner: (Czech Republic) Tomáš Němejc
  - 400 m winners: (Italy) Edoardo Scotti (m) / (Poland) Anna Kiełbasińska (f)
  - Men's 800 m winner: (Belgium) Aurèle Vandeputte
  - 1500 m winners: (United Kingdom) Elliot Giles (m) / (United Kingdom) Revée Walcott-Nolan (f)
  - Women's 60 m Hurdles winner: (Czech Republic) Helena Jiranová
  - Men's Long Jump winner: (Sweden) Thobias Montler
  - Women's Pole Vault winner: (Belarus) Iryna Zhuk
  - Men's Shot Put winner: (Poland) Michał Haratyk
- February 4: ISTAF Indoor in (Germany) Berlin
  - 60 m sprint winners: (Italy) Marcell Jacobs (m) / (United Kingdom) Daryll Neita (f)
  - 60 m Hurdles winners: (France) Aurel Manga (m) / (Finland) Reetta Hurske (f)
  - Women's Long Jump winner: (Sweden) Khaddi Sagnia
  - Men's Pole Vault winner: (Sweden) Armand Duplantis
- February 11: ORLEN Cup Łódź in (Poland) Łódź
  - 60 m winners: (Italy) Marcell Jacobs (m) / (Poland) Ewa Swoboda
  - 60 m Hurdles winners: (Brazil) Rafael Pereira (m) / (Finland) Reetta Hurske
  - Men's High Jump winner: (Ukraine) Andriy Protsenko
  - Men's Pole Vault winner: (Philippines) Ernest John Obiena
  - Men's Shot Put winner: (Poland) Konrad Bukowiecki
- February 12: Meeting Metz Moselle Athlélor in (France) Metz
  - 60 m winners: (Ivory Coast) Arthur Cissé (m) / (United States) Kayla White (f)
  - 200 m winners: (Netherlands) Isayah Boers (m) / (Netherlands) Lieke Klaver (f)
  - 400 m winners: (Netherlands) Liemarvin Bonevacia (m) / (Netherlands) Femke Bol (f)
  - 800 m winners: (Kenya) Noah Kibet (m) / (Switzerland) Lore Hoffmann (f)
  - Men's 1500 m winner: (Kenya) Abel Kipsang
  - 3000 m winners: (Ethiopia) Samuel Tefera (m) / (Netherlands) Jetske van Kampen (f)
  - 60 m Hurdles winners: (France) Pascal Martinot-Lagarde (m) / (Netherlands) Zoë Sedney
  - Men's Pole Vault winner: (United States) Chris Nilsen
  - Men's High Jump winner: (France) Kristen Biyengui
  - Men's Long Jump winner: (Greece) Miltiadis Tentoglou
- February 14: Meeting de l'Eure in (France) Val-de-Reuil
  - 60 m winners: (United States) Michael Rodgers (m) / (United States) Kayla White (f)
  - 800 m winners: (Kenya) Collins Kipruto (m) / (Uganda) Halimah Nakaayi (f)
  - Men's 1000 m winner: (Morocco) Abdelati El Guesse
  - Men's 1500 m winners: (United Kingdom) Elliot Giles
  - Women's 3000 m winners: (Ethiopia) Ayal Dagnachew
  - 60 m Hurdles winners: (United States) Jarret Eaton (m) / (Spain) Teresa Errandonea
  - Women's Pole Vault winner: (Slovenia) Tina Šutej
  - Men's High Jump winner: (Switzerland) Loïc Gasch
  - Men's Triple Jump winner: (France) Enzo Hodebar
- February 15: Banskobystricka latka in (Slovakia) Banská Bystrica
  - High Jump winners: (South Korea) Sanghyeok Woo (m) / (Australia) Eleanor Patterson (f)
- February 19: All Star Perche in (France) Aubiére
  - Pole Vault winners: (Netherlands) Meno Vloon (m) / Anzhelika Sidorova (f)
- February 20: ISTAF Indoor Düsseldorf in Germany
  - 60 m winners: (Ivory Coast) Artur Cissé (m) / (Poland) Ewa Swoboda (f)
  - 60 m Hurdles winners: (Cyprus) Milan Trajkovic (m) / (Netherlands) Nadine Visser (f)
  - Women's Long Jump winner: (Germany) Malaika Mihambo
  - Men's Pole Vault winner: (Germany) Bo Kanda Lita Baehre
- March 5: Perche Elite Tour Indoor in (France) Rouen
  - Pole Vault winners: (United States) Christopher Nielsen (m) / (Slovenia) Tina Šutej (f)
- March 6: Meeting de Paris Indoor in (France) Paris
  - 60 m winners: (United States) Michael Rodgers (m) / (Switzerland) Mujinga Kambundji (f)
  - 60 m Hurdles winners: (France) Wilhem Belocian (m) / (France) Cyréna Samba-Mayela (f)
  - Men's Pole Vault winner: (United States) Christopher Nielsen
  - Triple Jump winner: (France) Jean-Marc Pontvianne / (Portugal) Patrícia Mamona
- March 7: Belgrade Indoor Meeting in (Serbia) Belgrade
  - 60 m winners: (Slovakia) Ján Volko (m) / (Italy) Zaynab Dosso (f)
  - 400 m winners: (Slovakia) Šimon Bujna (m) / (Slovenia) Anita Horvat (f)
  - Women's 800 m winners: (Republic of Ireland) Louise Shanahan
  - Men's 1500 m winners: (United Kingdom) Elliot Giles
  - 60 m Hurdles winners: (Czech Republic) Petr Svoboda (m) / (Croatia) Ivana Lončarek (f)
  - Women's High Jump winner: (Montenegro) Marija Vuković
  - Men's Pole Vault winners: (Sweden) Armand Duplantis
  - Long Jump winner: (Greece) Miltiadis Tentoglou (m) / (Serbia) Ivana Vuleta (f)
  - Men's Shot Put winner: (Italy) Nick Ponzio

Bronze

- January 27: Kladno Indoor in (Czech Republic) Kladno
  - High Jump Indoor winners: (Syria) Majd Eddin Ghazal (m) / (Ukraine) Yuliya Chumachenko (f)
  - Shot Put Indoor winners: (Norway) Marcus Thomsen (m) / (Sweden) Fanny Roos (f)
- February 4: Meeting Elite de Miramas in (France) Miramas
  - Men's 60 m winner: (Kenya) Ferdinand Omurwa
  - 200 m winners: (Germany) Owen Ansah (m) / (Denmark) Ida Karstoft (f)
  - Men's 400 m winner: (Belgium) Julien Watrin
  - Men's 1500 m winner: (Italy) Ossama Meslek
  - Women's 3000 m winner: (Albania) Luiza Gega
  - 60 m Hurdles winners: (France) Pascal Martinot-Lagarde (m) / (United States) Evonne Britton (f)
  - Men's High Jump winner: (Switzerland) Loïc Gasch
  - Triple Jump winners: (Finland) Simo Lipsanen (m) / (Cuba) Leyanis Pérez (f)
  - Shot Put winners: (France) Frédéric Dagée (m) / (Germany) Yemisi Ogunleye (f)
- February 4 & 5: Dr. Sander Invitational in (United States) New York City
  - 400 m winners: (United States) Wellington Ventura (m) / (United States) Stephanie Davis (f)
  - 800 m winners: (United States) Shane Streich (m) / (United States) Sage Hurta (f)
  - 1500 m winners: (United States) Colin Sahlman (m) / (Mexico) Alma Cortés (f)
  - Men's 3000 m winner: (United States) Dan Schafer
  - Men's Pole Vault winner: (United States) Zach McWhorter
  - High Jump winners: (United States) Keenon Laine (m) / (United States) Amina Smith (f)
  - Men's Long Jump winner: (United States) Marquis Dendy
  - Women's Triple Jump winner: (United States) Tori Franklin
  - Women's Shot Put winner: (Canada) Sarah Mitton
- February 5: Hustopečské skákání in (Czech Republic) Hustopečské
  - High Jump Winners: (South Korea) Sanghyeok Woo (m) / (United Kingdom) Emily Borthwick (f)
- February 5: Dynamic New Athletics Indoor Match in (United Kingdom) Glasgow
  - 60 m winners: (United Kingdom) Andrew Robertson (m) / (Spain) María Isabel Pérez (f)
  - Women's 800 m winner: (United Kingdom) Jenny Selman
  - 60 m Hurdles winners: (Spain) Enrique Llopis (m) / (Spain) Teresa Errandonea (f)
  - Men's High Jump winner: (Spain) Xesc Tresens
  - Women's Long Jump winner: (Portugal) Evelise Veiga
  - Men's Shot Put winner: (Portugal) Francisco Belo
  - Mixed 2x2x200 m winners: England (Thomas Somers, Amy Hillyard)
  - Mixed 4 × 400 m winners: Spain (Iñaki Cañal, Aauri Bokesa, Sara Gallego, Bernat Erta)
- February 5: Hustopečské skákání in (Czech Republic) Hustopeče
  - High Jump winners: (South Korea) Woo Sang-hyeok (m) / (United Kingdom) Emily Borthwick (f)
- February 9: Meeting d'Athlétisme de Mondeville in (France) Mondeville
  - 60 m winners: (United States) Cravont Charleston (m) / (Trinidad and Tobago) Michelle-Lee Ahye (f)
  - 400 m winners: (Saudi Arabia) Mazen Al-Yassin (m) / (United Kingdom) Ama Pipi (f)
  - Women's 1500 m winner: (Ethiopia) Netsanet Desta
  - Men's 3000 m winner: (Kenya) Daniel Ebenyo
  - 60 m Hurdles winners: (France) Wilhem Belocian (m) / (France) Laëticia Bapté (f)
  - Women's High Jump winner: (United Kingdom) Emily Borthwick
  - Women's Triple Jump winner: (France) Rouguy Diallo
  - Women's Pole Vault winner: (United States) Jacob Wooten
- February 12: PSD Bank Indoor Meeting in (Germany) Dortmund
  - 60 m winners: (Netherlands) Joris van Gool (m) / (Germany) Gina Lückenkemper (f)
  - Women's 200 m winner: (Germany) Lilly Kaden
  - 400 m winners: (Czech Republic) Pavel Maslák & (Romania) Mihai Sorin Dringo (m) / (Poland) Justyna Święty-Ersetic (f)
  - Women's 800 m winner: (Kenya) Eglay Nafuna Nalyanya
  - 1500 m winners: (Portugal) Isaac Nader (m) / (United States) Eleanor Fulton (f)
  - Men's 3000 m winner: (Ethiopia) Abrham Sime
  - Women's Long Jump winner: (Germany) Merle Homeier
  - Men's Pole Vault winner: (United States) KC Lightfoot
- February 12: American Track League #1 in (United States) Louisville
  - 60 m winners: (Liberia) Emmanuel Matadi (m) / (United States) Kiara Parker (f)
  - Women's 200 m winner: (Puerto Rico) Jasmine Camacho-Quinn
  - 300 m winners: (United States) Kahmari Montgomery (m) / (Canada) Kyra Constantine (f)
  - 800 m winners: (United States) Erik Sowinski (m) / (United States) Charlene Lipsey (f)
  - 1000 m winners: (United States) Shane Streich (m) / (United States) Danae Rivers (f)
  - 3000 m winners: (Canada) Rory Linkletter (m) / (United States) Emma Grace Hurley (f)
  - 60 m Hurdles winners: (United States) Devon Allen (m) / (Jamaica) Britany Anderson (f)
  - Women's High Jump winner: (United States) Vashti Cunningham
  - Women's Pole Vault winner: (United States) Sandi Morris
  - Men's Shot Put winner: (United States) Josh Awotunde
- March 6: World Tune-Up – Adam Sanford Pro in (United States) New York City
  - 60 m winners: (Puerto Rico) Miles Lewis (m) / (Canada) Khamica Bingham (f)
  - Men's 200 m winner: (Puerto Rico) Ezequil Suarez Hidalgo
  - 400 m winners: (Guyana) Arinze Chance (m) / (Jamaica) Junelle Bromfield (f)
  - 800 m winners: (Canada) Marco Arop (m)
  - Women's 3000 m winners: (Mexico) Laura Galván
  - Women's 60 m Hurdles winners: (Jamaica) Danielle Williams
  - Women's Long Jump winner: (Jamaica) Chanice Porter
- Cancelled: LLN Indoor in (Belgium) Louvain-la-Neuve
- TBD: Chinese Indoor Tour Round #1 in (China) Chengdu
- TBD: Chinese Indoor Tour Round #2 in (China) Chengdu

Challenger

- February 6: RIG Games in (Iceland) Reykjavík
  - 60 m winners: (Iceland) Birgir Jóhannes Jónsson (m) / (Netherlands) Naomi Sedney (f)
  - 200 m winners: (Iceland) Gudmundur August Thoroddsen (m) / (Iceland) Guðbjörg Jóna Bjarnadóttir (f)
  - 400 m winners: (Iceland) Dagur Fannar Einarsson (m) / (Finland) Milja Thureson (f)
  - 800 m winners: (Iceland) Samundur Ólafsson (m) / (Iceland) Ísold Sævarsdóttir (f)
  - High Jump winners: (Iceland) Kristján Viggó Sigfinnsson (m) / (Iceland) Eva María Baldursdóttir (f)
  - Long Jump winners: (Iceland) Daníel Ingi Egilsson (m) / (Iceland) Hildigunnur Þórarinsdóttir (f)
  - Shot Put winners: (Netherlands) Sven Poelmann (m) / (United States) Chase Ealey (f)
- February 9: Beijer Stavhoppsgala in (Sweden) Uppsala
  - Winner: (Sweden) Armand Duplantis
- February 13: Nordic Indoor Match in (Sweden) Uppsala
  - 60 m winners: (Norway) Even Meinseth (m) / (Sweden) Claudia Payton (f)
  - 200 m winners: (Sweden) Zion Eriksson (m) / (Denmark) Ida Karstoft (f)
  - 400 m winners: (Sweden) Carl Bengtström (m) / (Norway) Linn Oppegaard (f)
  - 800 m winners: (Sweden) Erik Martinsson (m) / (Finland) Sara Kuivisto (f)
  - 1500 m winners: (Norway) Mats Hauge (m) / (Sweden) Sara Christiansson (f)
  - 3000 m winners: (Sweden) Jonathan Grahn (m) / (Denmark) Sofía Thørgersen (f)
  - 60 m hurdles winners: (Finland) Ilari Manninen (m) / (Denmark) Mette Graversgaard (f)
  - High Jump winners: (Sweden) Fabian Delryd (m) / (Sweden) Louise Ekman (f)
  - Pole Vault winners: (Norway) Pål Haugen Lillefosse (m) / (Denmark) Caroline Bonde Holm (f)
  - Long Jump winners: (Sweden) Thobias Montler (m) / (Sweden) Tilde Johansson (f)
  - Triple Jump winners: (Sweden) Gabriel Wallmark (m) / (Sweden) Rebecka Abrahamsson (f)
  - Shot Put winners: (Norway) Marcus Thomsen (m) / (Sweden) Fanny Roos (f)

== 2021–2022 World Athletics Cross Country Tour ==
Gold

- October 16, 2021: Cardiff Cross Challenge in (United Kingdom) Cardiff
  - Winners: (United Kingdom) Hugo Milner (m) / (United Kingdom) Charlotte Arter (f)
- October 24, 2021: Cross Internacional Zornoza in (Spain) Amorebieta-Etxano
  - Winners: (Eritrea) Awet Habte (m) / (Burundi) Francine Niyomukunzi (f)
- October 31, 2021: Cross Internacional de Soria in (Spain) Soria
  - Winners: (Burundi) Rodrigue Kwizera (m) / (Kenya) Lucy Mawia (f)
- November 14, 2021: Cross de Atapuerca in (Spain) Atapuerca
  - Winners: (Eritrea) Aron Kifle (m) / (Eritrea) Rahel Daniel (f)
- November 21, 2021: Cross Internacional de Itálica in (Spain) Sevilla
  - Winners: (Burundi) Rodrigue Kwizera (m) / (Kenya) Norah Jeruto (f)
- November 28, 2021: Cross Internacional de la Constitución in (Spain) Alcobendas
  - Winners: (Spain) Abdessamad Oukhelfen (m) / (Eritrea) Dolshi Tesfu (f)
- December 4, 2021: Mt. SAC Cross Country Invitational in (United States) Walnut
  - Winners: (United States) Dillon Maggard (m) / (United States) Allie Buchalski (f)
- December 19, 2021: Cross Internacional de Venta de Baños in (Spain) Venta de Baños
  - Winners: (Burundi) Rodrigue Kwizera (m) / (Kenya) Edinah Jebitok (f)
- January 6: Campaccio in (Italy) San Giorgio su Legnano
  - Winners: (Ethiopia) Addisu Yihune (m) / (Ethiopia) Dawit Seyaum (f)
- January 9: Juan Muguerza Cross-Country Race in (Spain) Elgoibar
  - Winners: (Kenya) Nicholas Kimeli (m) / (Kenya) Edinah Jebitok (f)
- January 30: Cinque Mulini in (Italy) San Vittore Olona
  - Winners: (Ethiopia) Nibret Melak (m) / (Kenya) Teresia Muthoni Gateri (f)
- February 12: Agnes Tirop Cross Country Classic in (Kenya) Eldoret
  - Winners: (Kenya) Samuel Chebole (m) / (Kenya) Joyce Chepkemoi Tele (f)
- February 20: Lotto Cross Cup de Hannut in (Belgium) Hannut
  - Winners: (Germany) Samuel Fitwi (m) / (Uganda) Peruth Chemutai (f)
- February 27: Cross das Amendoeiras em Flor in (Portugal) Albufeira
  - Winners: (Burundi) Rodrigue Kwizera (m) / (Eritrea) Rahel Daniel (f)
- March 6: Gran Premio Cáceres Campo a Través in (Spain) Serradilla
  - Winners: (Burundi) Thierry Ndikumwenayo (m) / (Turkey) Yasemin Can (f)

Silver

- September 25, 2021: TCS Lidingöloppet in (Sweden) Lidingö
  - Winners: (Eritrea) Samuel Russom (m) / (Kenya) Sylvia Mboga Medugu (f)
- November 28, 2021: International Warandecross Tilburg in (Netherlands) Tilburg
  - Winners: (Switzerland) Jonas Raess (m) / (Sweden) Meraf Bahta (f)
- January 22: Northern Ireland International Cross Country in (United Kingdom) Belfast (final)
  - Winners: (United Kingdom) Zakariya Mahamed (m) / (Kenya) Hellen Obiri (f)

Bronze

- November 7, 2021: Cross de San Sebastián in (Spain) San Sebastián
  - Winners: (Burundi) Rodrigue Kwizera (m) / (Ethiopia) Zenebu Fikadu (f)
- November 7, 2021: CrossCup de Mol in (Belgium) Mol
  - Winners: (Luxembourg) Ruben Querinjean (m) / (Belgium) Elise Vanderelst (f)
- February 6: Cross della Vallagarina in (Italy) Rovereto (final)
  - Winners: (Ethiopia) Tadese Takele (m) / (Slovenia) Klara Lukan (f)
- March 6: Brussels CrossCup in (Belgium) Bruxelles (final)
  - Winners: (Belgium) Michael Somers (m) / (Belgium) Mieke Gorissen (f)

== 2021–22 World Athletics Race Walking Tour ==
Bronze

- December 19, 2021: Open Irish 35 km Race Walking Championships in (Republic of Ireland) Dublin
  - Winners: (Sweden) Perseus Karlström (m) / (Poland) Agnieszka Ellward (f)
- January 8: Ecuadorian Race Walking Championships in (Ecuador) Machala
  - 35 km winners: (Ecuador) Brian Pintado (m) / (Ecuador) Magaly Bonilla (f)
  - 20 km winners: (Ecuador) Jordy Jiménez (m) / (Ecuador) Glenda Morejón (f)
- January 16: USA Open 35 km Race Walking Championships in (United States) Santee
  - Winners: (United States) Nick Christie (m) / (United States) Miranda Melville (f)
- January 22: Turkish Open 20 km & 35 km Race Walking Championships in (Turkey) Antalya
  - Men's 35 km winner: (Slovakia) Michal Morvay
  - 20 km winners: (Turkey) Şahin Şenoduncu (m) / (Kazakhstan) Galina Yakusheva (f)
- January 30: Spanish Open 35 km Race Walking Championships in (Spain) Lepe
  - Winners: (Spain) Miguel Ángel López (m) / (Spain) María Pérez (f)
- January 30: 5° Circuito Nacional de Caminata Coatzacoalcos in (Mexico) Coatzacoalcos
  - 20 km winners: (Mexico) Noel Chama (m) / (Mexico) Alegna González (f)
  - 35 km winners: (Mexico) Ricardo Ortiz (m) / (Mexico) Ilse Guerrero (f)
- February 13: Oceania Open 20 km Race Walking Championships in (Australia) Adelaide
  - Winners: (Australia) Declan Tingay (m) / (Australia) Jemima Montag (f)
- February 13: Spanish Open 20 km Race Walking Championships in (Spain) Pamplona
  - Winners: (Spain) Alberto Amezcua (m) / (Spain) María Pérez (f)
- March 20: 2022 Asian 20 km Race Walking Championships (Japan) Nomi
  - Women's 5 km winners: (Japan) Satsuki Nakano
  - Men's 10 km winners: (Japan) Atsuki Tsuchiya
  - 20 km winners: (Japan) Daisuke Matsunga (m) / (Japan) Serena Sonoda (f)
