= 2022 British Indoor Athletics Championships =

Indoor track and field competition for British athletes

- Dates: 26–27 February
- Host city: Birmingham, United Kingdom
- Venue: Arena Birmingham
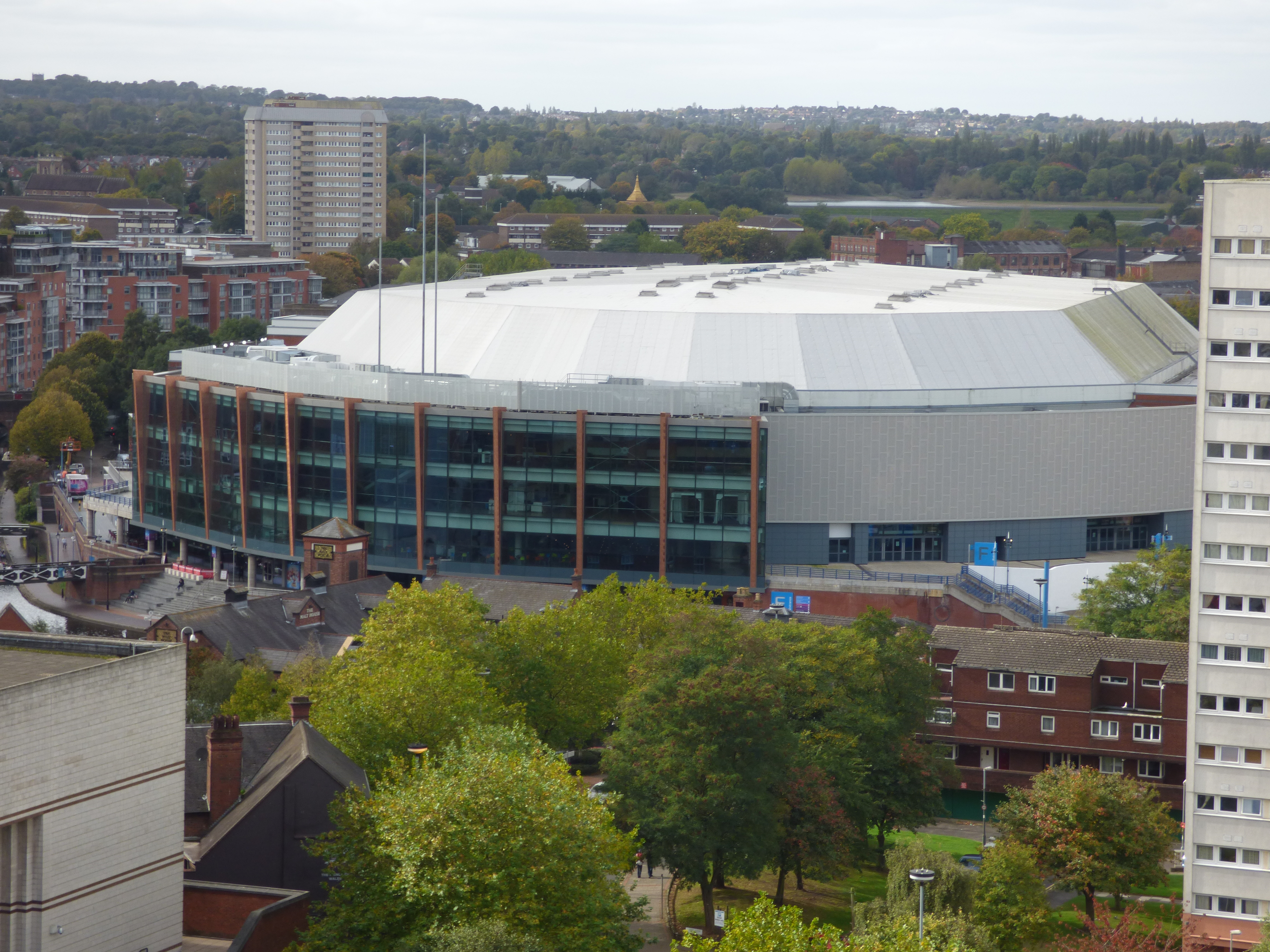
- Level: Senior
- Type: Indoor

The 2022 British Indoor Athletics Championships were the national indoor track and field competition for British athletes, held on 26 and 27 February 2022 at Arena Birmingham. The competition served as a qualification event for the 2022 World Athletics Indoor Championships, and on 1 March, 33 British competitors were announced for that championships, and this was increased to 36 a couple of days later.

== Background ==
The 2022 British Indoor Athletics Championships were held on 26 and 27 February 2022 at Arena Birmingham. The 2020 event had been held at the Emirates Arena in Glasgow, and the 2021 championships was cancelled due to the COVID-19 pandemic. The 2022 event was used as a qualification event for the 2022 World Athletics Indoor Championships in March 2022 in Belgrade, Serbia. In addition, parasports events were held in the 60 metres. The championships were broadcast on the BBC website.

== Highlights ==
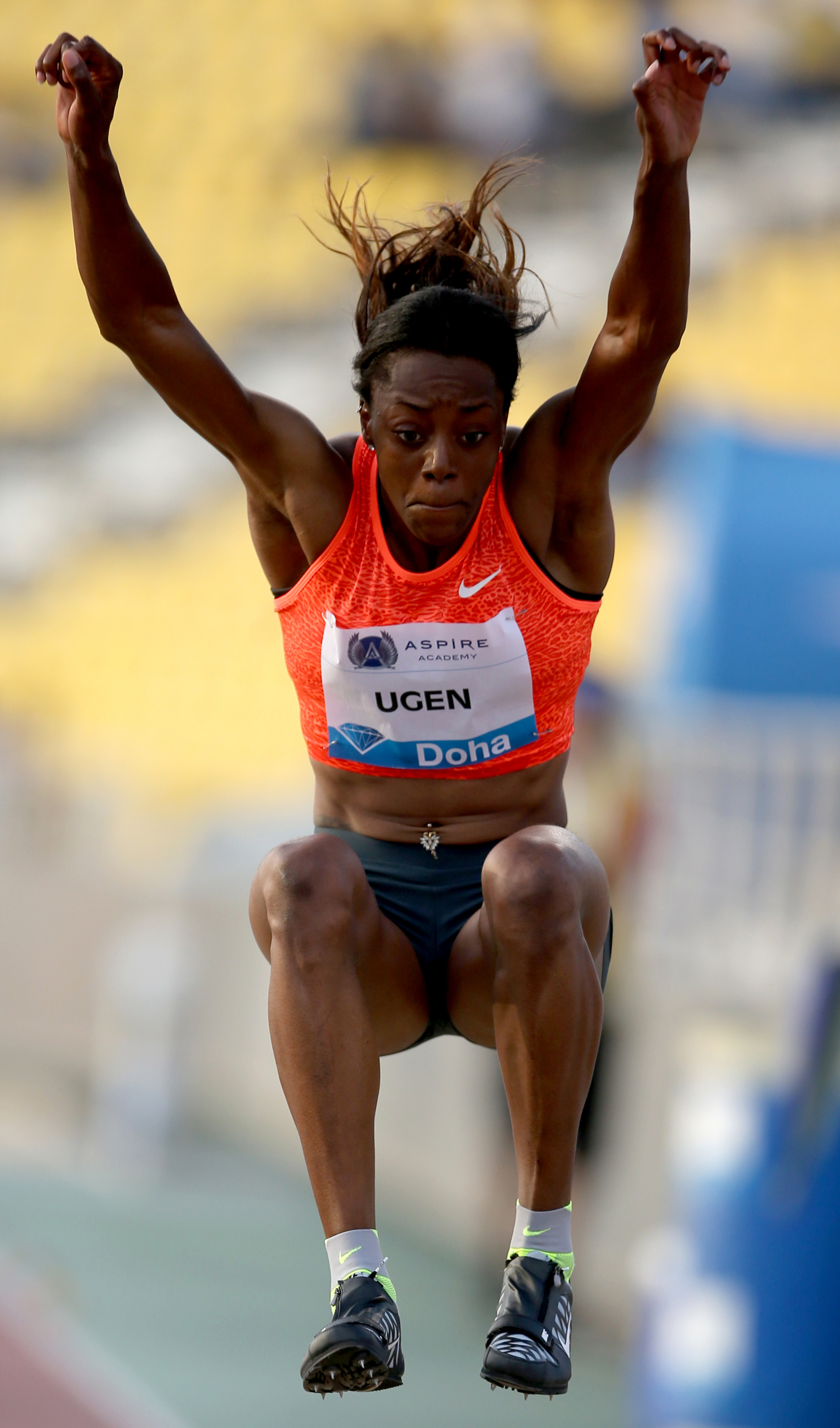
Lorraine Ugen equalled the championship record in the long jump.

Sophie McKinna won the shot put event with a British Indoor Athletics Championships record distance of 18.82 metres. Lorraine Ugen won the long jump event, and equalled the Championship record.

Adelle Tracey won the 1500 metres event, ahead of Erin Wallace and Holly Archer. Adam Thomas won the men's 60 metres event, and Cheyanne Evans-Gray won the women's competition. Andrew Pozzi won the men's 60 metres hurdles event; he was the current indoor world champion at the event, and qualified for the World Championship as a result. Megan Marrs won the women's 60 metres hurdles event.

Jessie Knight won the women's 400 metres event, ahead of Keely Hodgkinson and Ama Pipi, who finished second and third respectively. Hodkingson had already qualified for the 800 metres event at the 2022 World Athletics Indoor Championships, and so decided to participate in the 400 metres race instead. Alex Haydock-Wilson finished first at the men's 400 metres event, but was later disqualified. As a result, Ben Higgins was declared the event winner.

The men's Para Mixed Ambulant 60m sprints was won by Zac Shaw in a T12 record time of 6.98 seconds. Thomas Young and Emmanuel Oyinbo-Coker finished second and third respectively. The women's event was won by Sophie Hahn, ahead of Faye Olszowka and Esme O'Connell.

On the first day of the Championships, five athletes achieved qualification for the 2022 World Athletics Indoor Championships. On the second day, eight further athletes qualified for the World Championships. On 1 March, UK Athletics announced that 33 athletes would compete for Great Britain at the 2022 World Athletics Indoor Championships. On 3 March, three additional competitors were announced, bringing the total up to 36.

== Results ==
=== Men ===
Event	Gold		Silver		Bronze	
60 metres	Adam Thomas	6.56s PB	Andrew Robertson	6.58s SB	Jeremiah Azu	6.61s
200 metres	Toby Harries	20.99s PB	Ben Snaith	21.01s PB	Joe Ferguson	21.35s
400 metres	Ben Higgins	46.82s	James Williams	46.89s	Sam Reardon	47.01s
800 metres	Elliot Giles	1:47.99	Guy Learmonth	1:48.58	Ben Greenwood	1:49.13
1500 metres	Piers Copeland	3:49.01	Neil Gourley	3:49.13	Charlie Grice	3:50.22
3000 metres	Marc Scott	7:53.35 SB	Jamaine Coleman	7:53.92	James West	7:53.95
3000 metres race walk	Christopher Snook	12:27.27 PB	Tom Pattington	12:41.43 PB	Luc Legon	13:15.66 SB
60 metres hurdles	Andrew Pozzi	7.67s	Cameron Fillery	7.85s	Miguel Perera	7.87s
High jump	Kelechi Aguocha; David Smith	2.13m	Not awarded		Joel Clarke-Khan; William Grimsey	2.09m
Pole vault	Harry Coppell	5.50m	Ethan Walsh	5.07m SB	Jack Phipps	5.07m SB
Long jump	Samuel Khogali	7.54m PB	Murray Fotheringham	7.46m	Allan Hamilton	7.41m SB
Triple jump	Seun Okome	16.13m PB	Ben Williams	16.05m SB	Jude Bright-Davies	15.91m PB
Shot put	Scott Lincoln	19.52m	Youcef Zatat	17.79m	Patrick Swan	17.09m PB
Heptathlon	Lewis Church	5488 SB	Harry Kendall	5441 PB	Howard Bell	5434 PB
Para Mixed Ambulant 60 Metres	Zac Shaw	6.98s NR	Thomas Young	7.04s	Emmanuel Oyinbo-Coker	7.15s PB

=== Women ===
Event	Gold		Silver		Bronze	
60 metres	Cheyanne Evans-Gray	7.25s	Alisha Rees	7.31s PB	Kimbeley Baptiste	7.33s
200 metres	Hannah Brier	23.64s PB	Ellie Booker	23.70s PB	Jazmine Moss	23.94
400 metres	Jessie Knight	52.37s	Keely Hodgkinson	52.42s PB	Ama Pipi	52.43
800 metres	Jenny Selman	2:08.29	Jemma Reekie	2:08.52	Abigal Ives	2:08.98
1500 metres	Adelle Tracey	4:13.14	Erin Wallace	4:14.72	Holly Archer	4:18.36
3000 metres	Amy-Eloise Markovc	9:04.26	Amelia Quirk	9:06.21 SB	Isobel Fry	9:09.30
3000 metres race walk	Bethan Davies	13:24:07 SB	Hannah Hopper	14:24.14 PB	Erika Kelly	14:24.64 SB
60 metres hurdles	Megan Marrs	8.15s SB	Holly Mills	8.20s	Alicia Barrett	8.23s
High jump	Laura Zialor	1.88m	Emily Borthwick	1.88m	Kate Anson	1.82m SB
Pole vault	Sophie Cook	4.45m SB	Jade Ive	4.40m SB	Sophie Ashurst	4.15m PB
Long jump	Lorraine Ugen	6.75m CR	Jahisha Thomas	6.45m	Jazmin Sawyers	6.42m
Triple jump	Naomi Metzger	13.81m	Emily Gargan	12.69m PB	Lia Stephenson	12.64m SB
Shot put	Sophie McKinna	18.82m CR	Amelia Strickler	17.62m SB	Adele Nicoll	17.02m PB
Pentathlon	Ella Rush	4365 CR	Jodie Smith	4277 PB	Lauren Evans	4020 PB
Para Mixed Ambulant 60 Metres	Sophie Hahn	8.11s NR	Faye Olszowka	8.30s	Esme O'Connell	8.39s PB
