= Athletics at the 2022 Commonwealth Games – Women's high jump =

Women's high jump at the 2022 Commonwealth Games
- Venue: Alexander Stadium
- Dates: 4 August (qualification); 6 August (final)
- Competitors: 18 from 12 nations
- Winning height: 1.95

Medalists
gold medal	Lamara Distin	Jamaica
silver medal	Eleanor Patterson	Australia
bronze medal	Kimberly Williamson	Jamaica

The women's high jump at the 2022 Commonwealth Games, as part of the athletics programme, took place in the Alexander Stadium on 4 and 6 August 2022.

== Records ==
Prior to this competition, the existing world and Games records were as follows:

World record	Stefka Kostadinova (BUL)	2.09 m	Rome, Italy	30 August 1987
Commonwealth record	Hestrie Cloete (RSA)	2.06 m	Saint-Denis, France	31 August 2003
Games record	Hestrie Cloete (RSA)	1.96 m	Manchester, England	30 July 2002

== Schedule ==
The schedule was as follows:

Date	Time	Round
Thursday 4 August 2022	11:05	Qualification
Saturday 6 August 2022	10:17	Final

All times are British Summer Time (UTC+1)

== Results ==
=== Qualification ===
Qualification: 1.90 (Q) or 12 best performers (q) advance to the Final. .

Rank	Group	Name	1.60	1.66	1.71	1.76	1.81	Result	Notes
1	A	Temitope Adeshina (NGR)	–	–	o	o	o	1.81	q
1	B	Abigail Kwarteng (GHA)	–	–	–	o	o	1.81	q
1	B	Morgan Lake (ENG)	–	–	–	o	o	1.81	q
1	B	Nicola Olyslagers (AUS)	–	–	–	–	o	1.81	q
1	A	Eleanor Patterson (AUS)	–	–	–	–	o	1.81	q
1	A	Kimberly Williamson (JAM)	–	–	–	o	o	1.81	q
1	A	Laura Zialor (ENG)	–	–	o	o	o	1.81	q
8	A	Emily Borthwick (ENG)	–	–	–	xo	o	1.81	q
8	B	Esther Isa (NGR)	–	–	o	xo	o	1.81	q
8	B	Keeley O'Hagan (NZL)	–	–	o	xo	o	1.81	q
11	B	Lamara Distin (JAM)	–	–	–	–	xo	1.81	q
12	A	Rose Amoanimaa Yeboah (GHA)	–	o	o	o	xxo	1.81	q, SB
13	B	Natasha Chetty (SEY)	xo	o	o	o	xxx	1.76	SB
14	A	Tyra Gittens (TTO)	–	–	–	xo	xxx	1.76	
15	A	Sakari Famous (BER)	–	–	o	xxo	xxx	1.76	
15	B	Michelle Sng Suat Li (SGP)	o	o	o	xxo	xxx	1.76	
17	B	Despoina Charalambous (CYP)	–	o	o	xxx		1.71	
18	A	Ummay Rumky (BAN)	o	o	xxx			1.66	

=== Final ===
The medals were determined in the final.

Rank	Name	1.71	1.76	1.81	1.85	1.89	1.92	1.95	1.98	Result	Notes
1st place, gold medalist(s)	Lamara Distin (JAM)	–	o	o	o	o	xo	o	xxx	1.95	
2nd place, silver medalist(s)	Eleanor Patterson (AUS)	–	–	–	o	o	xo	xxx		1.92	
3rd place, bronze medalist(s)	Kimberly Williamson (JAM)	–	o	o	xo	o	xo	xxx		1.92	
4	Morgan Lake (ENG)	–	–	xo	xo	o	xo	xxx		1.92	
5	Abigail Kwarteng (GHA)	o	o	o	o	o	xxx			1.89	
6	Keeley O'Hagan (NZL)	–	o	xxo	o	xxo	xxx			1.89	PB
7	Rose Amoanimaa Yeboah (GHA)	o	xxo	o	o	xxx				1.85	PB
8	Laura Zialor (ENG)	–	o	o	xo	xxx				1.85	
9	Esther Isa (NGR)	o	o	o	xxx					1.81	
10	Temitope Adeshina (NGR)	xo	o	xxo	xxx					1.81	
11	Emily Borthwick (ENG)	–	o	xxx						1.76	
	Nicola Olyslagers (AUS)	DNS									
