= 2023 British Indoor Athletics Championships =

Indoor track and field competition for British athletes

- Dates: 18–19 February
- Host city: Birmingham, United Kingdom
- Venue: Arena Birmingham
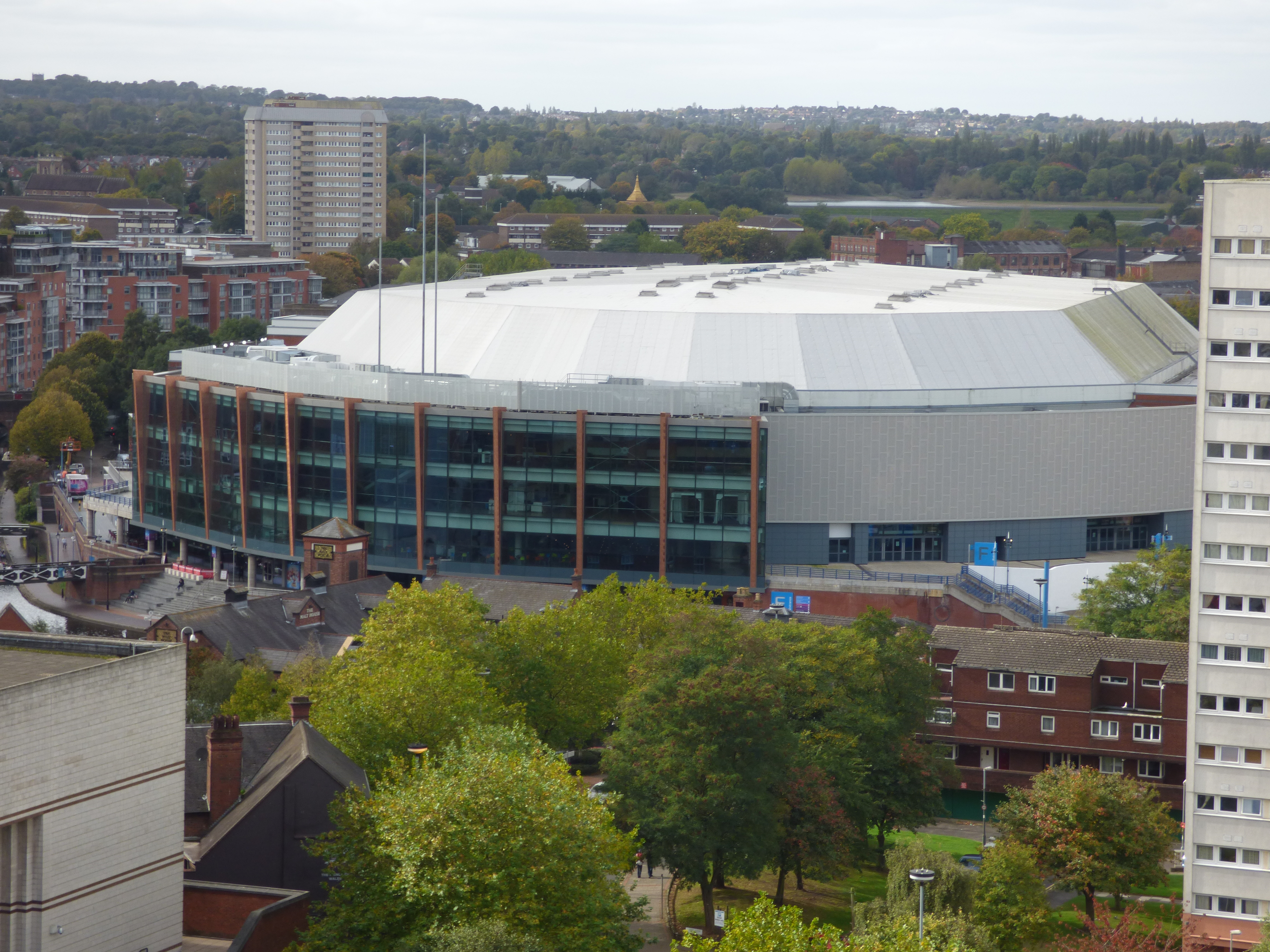
- Level: Senior
- Type: Indoor

The 2023 British Indoor Athletics Championships were the national indoor track and field competition for British athletes, held on 18 and 19 February 2023 at Arena Birmingham. The competition served as a qualification event for the 2023 European Athletics Indoor Championships.

== Background ==
The 2023 British Indoor Athletics Championships were held on 18 and 19 February 2023 at Arena Birmingham. In the United Kingdom, they were shown on BBC television and online. The championships were used as a qualification event for the 2023 European Athletics Indoor Championships, though many athletes who had already qualified for that competition chose not to compete at the British championships.

== Highlights ==
Ellie Baker won the 1,500 metres event in a championship record time of 4:06:73. The previous record had been held by Zola Budd since 1986. The 60 metres races were won by Reece Prescod and Daryll Neita respectively. Both athletes qualified for the European Indoor Championships as a result. Mary Elcock won the women's triple jump event on countback, after tying for the best distance in the event. Jazmin Sawyers won the long jump event, seven years after her last British title at the event. Aled Davies finished fifth in the able bodied shot put event, and broke his own world record for F42 classification athletes in the event.

The men's 60 metres para event was won by Kevin Santos, and the women's competition was won by Faye Olszowka.

== Results ==
=== Men ===
Event	Gold		Silver		Bronze	
60 metres	Reece Prescod	6.54s SB	Jeremiah Azu	6.57s SB	Eugene Amo-Dadzie	6.61s SB
200 metres	Richard Akinyebo	21.10s PB	Stephen Baffour	21.16s PB	Derek Kinlock	21.46s
400 metres	Samuel Reardon	46.96s SB	Ben Higgins	47.07s	Lee Thompson	47.14s
800 metres	Guy Learmonth	1:47.43	Ben Claridge	1:48.06 PB	James McMurray	1:49.42 PB
1500 metres	Neil Gourley	3:41.20	George Mills	3:42.87	Blake Moore	3:47.74 SB
3000 metres	James West	7:47.78	Osian Perrin	7:50.86 PB	Charles Wheeler	7:51.80 PB
3000 metres race walk	Callum Wilkinson	11:00:98 SB	Christopher Snook	11:57.16 PB	Luc Legon	12:44.21 PB
60 metres hurdles	David King	7.62s SB	Andrew Pozzi	7.81s	Cameron Fillery	7.93s SB
High jump	William Grimsey	2.16m	Divine Duruaku	2.12m	Akin Coward	2.12m
Pole vault	Charlie Myers	5.05m SB	Ewan Bradley; Reuben Nairne; Jack Phipps	4.90m	Not awarded	
Long jump	Reynold Banigo	7.85m SB	Jack Roach	7.53m	Samuel Khogali	7.45m
Triple jump	Jude Bright-Davies	16.05m PB	Seun Okome	15.40m SB	Montel Nevers	15.32m SB
Shot put	Scott Lincoln	20.36m SB	Youcef Zatat	18.47m SB	Patrick Swan	17.39m PB
Para 60 Metres	Kevin Santos	7.02s PB	Zac Shaw	7.02s	Emmanuel Oyinbo-Coker	7.10s SB

=== Women ===
Event	Gold		Silver		Bronze	
60 metres	Daryll Neita	7.17s	Asha Philip	7.21s SB	Alisha Rees	7.30s
200 metres	Success Eduan	23.49s	Hannah Brier	23.60s PB	Hannah Williams	23.77s PB
400 metres	Ama Pipi	52.52s SB	Laviai Nielsen	52.90s	Carys Mcaulay	52.98s PB
800 metres	Isabelle Boffey	2:03.27	Jenny Selman	2:03.68	Abigail Ives	2:03.97
1500 metres	Ellie Baker	4:06.73 CR	Katie Snowden	4:06.98	Erin Wallace	4:09.22 SB
3000 metres	Melissa Courtney-Bryant	8:50.76	Hannah Nuttall	8:50.85	Eloise Walker	9:00.53
3000 metres race walk	Abigail Jennings	14:16.37 PB	Erika Kelly	14:28.88	Gracie Griffiths	14:34.12 SB
60 metres hurdles	Cindy Sember	8.10s SB	Marli Jessop	8.26s PB	Alicia Barrett	8.32s
High jump	Morgan Lake	1.90m	Laura Zialor	1.87m	Kate Anson	1.84m
Pole vault	Jade Ive	4.35m SB	Sophie Cook	4.25m	Jade Spencer-Smith	4.15m
Long jump	Jazmin Sawyers	6.73m	Lucy Hadaway	6.56m	Jodie Smith	6.16m
Triple jump	Mary Elcock	12.71m PB	Lily Hulland	12.71m SB	Montana Jackson	12.46m SB
Shot put	Sophie McKinna	17.20m	Amelia Strickler	17.01m SB	Serena Vincent	16.76m PB
Para 60 Metres	Faye Olszowka	8.18s SB	Alison Smith	8.39s PB	Hetty Bartlett	8.41s PB
