= 2025 Italian Athletics Indoor Championships =

Edition of the Italian Athletics Indoor Championships

- Dates: 22-23 February
- Host city: Ancona
- Venue: PalaCasali
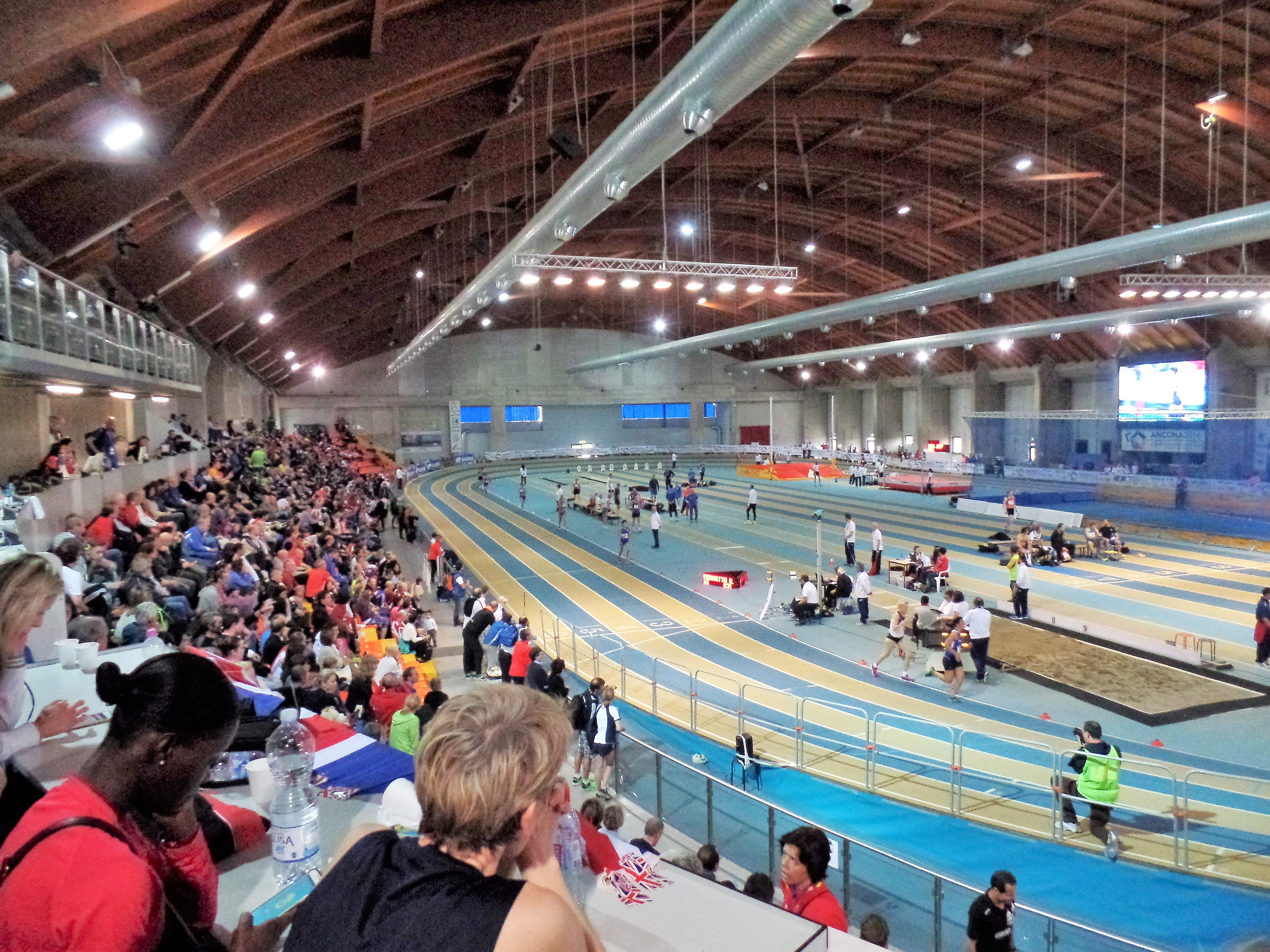
- Level: Senior
- Events: 26 + 2 relays

2025 Italian Athletics Indoor Championships was the 56th edition of the Italian Athletics Indoor Championships held in Ancona.

== Champions ==
Event	Men	Performance	Women	Performance
60 m	Yassin Bandaogo	6.69	Zaynab Dosso	7.07
400 m	Luca Sito	46.15	Alice Mangione	52.18
800 m	Giovanni Lazzaro	1:47.42	Eloisa Coiro	2:02.15
1500 m	Federico Riva	3:54.37	Ludovica Cavalli	4:11.37
3000 m	Federico Riva	7:57.12	Ludovica Cavalli	9:03.66
60 m hs	Nicolò Giacalone	7.82	Giada Carmassi	8.02
5000/3000 m race walk	Francesco Fortunato	17:16.65	Federica Curiazzi	12:17.08
High jump	Matteo Sioli	2.28 m	Idea Pieroni	1.91 m
Pole vault	Matteo Oliveri	5.70 m	Roberta Bruni	4.58 m
Long jump	Daniele Inzoli	7.93 m	Larissa Iapichino	6.69 m
Triple jump	Andrea Dallavalle	17.38 m	Erika Saraceni	13.71 m
Shot put	Leonardo Fabbri	21.86 m	Sara Verteramo	16.33 m
Combined events	Andrea Cerrato	5500 pts	Sara Chiaratti	4193 pts
