= Ben Claridge =

British middle-distance runner

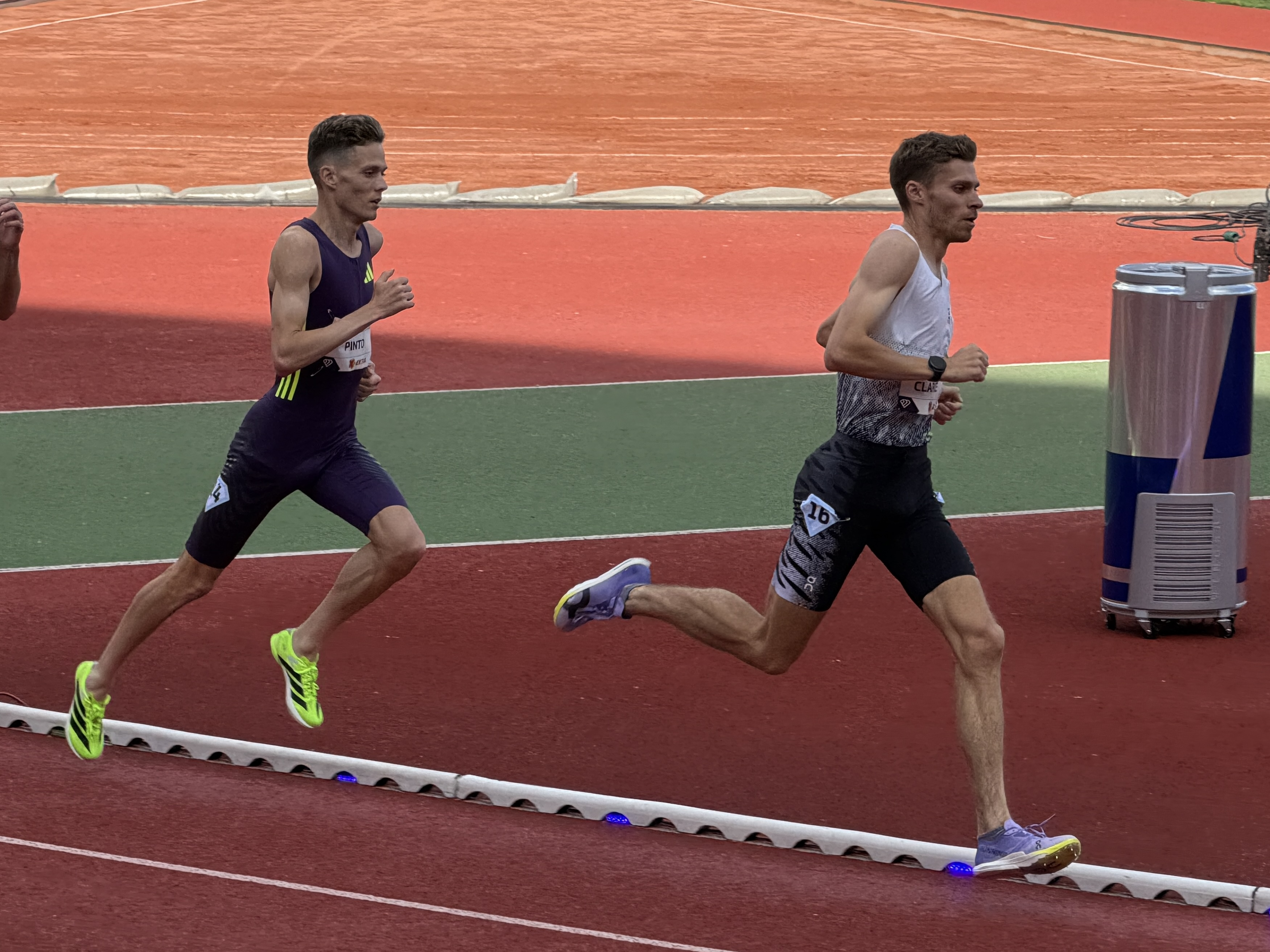
- Clarisge at the 2026 Bislett Games

Personal information
- Born: 12 November 1997 (age 28)

Sport
- Sport: Athletics
- Event: Middle-distance running

Achievements and titles
- Personal best(s): 800m: 1:47.20 (Watford, 2025)

Ben Claridge (born 12 November 1997) is a British middle-distance runner. He was runner-up over 800 metres at the 2023 British Indoor Athletics Championships.

== Early life ==
He is from Blewbury in Oxfordshire, and was educated at King Alfred's Academy in Wantage. He joined the White Horse Harriers athletic Club when he was 11-years-old and would also train as a youngster in Abingdon's Tilsley Park, and felt personally inspired to pursue athletics after attending the 2012 Olympic Games in London as a spectator.

== Career ==
He won the senior boys title as an 18 year-old over 400 metres at the English Schools Championship in Gateshead in 2016. He was educated in Sport Performance at the University of Bath, and was a silver medalist over 400 metres at the British Universities and Colleges Sport (BUCS) Outdoor Championships in 2018, winning gold in the 4x400 metres relay at the same championships. He also won the England under-23 title in the 400m. After graduating in 2020, he became based in Cardiff. He also briefly trained in Guernsey when races were cancelled due to the Coronavirus pandemic, in a training group including Cameron and Alastair Chalmers.

He was runner-up over 800 metres at the 2023 British Indoor Athletics Championships behind race winner Guy Learmonth, running a personal best time of 1:48.06.

In January 2025, he won the mile run at the 2025 Butterfield Mile in Bermuda. He won the mile run on the road at the Riga Marathon in Latvia in May 2025 in 4:08.84. He lowered his personal best for the 800 metres to 1:47.20 in Watford in June 2025. He acted as pacemaker at the 2025 London Athletics Meet, part of the 2025 Diamond League, as Phanuel Koech set a new meeting record for the 1500 metres on 19 July 2025.
