= Samuel Khogali =

English athlete

Personal information
- Nationality: British (English)
- Born: 15 July 1997 (age 28) Worcester, England

Sport
- Sport: Athletics
- Event: Long jump
- Club: Worcester; Woodford Green with Essex Ladies

Achievements and titles
- Personal best(s): Long jump: 7.93m (Athens, 2026)

Samuel Khogali (born 15 July 1997) is a British long jumper. He won the 2022 British Indoor Athletics Championships.

== Early life ==
Born in Worcester, England, he competed from a young age as a member of Worcester Athletics Club. He attended Redhill Primary School and King's School, Worcester before studying at the University of Loughborough.

== Career ==
Khogali attended Loughborough University for whom he jumped a personal best of 7.40 metres in Sheffield at the British Universities and Colleges Sport (BUCS) Championships in February 2019. Later that year, he improved his personal best again with a jump of 7.75m at the Maltese Athletics Challenge Meeting in April. He won the Loughborough International representing England that year with a jump of 7.56 metres. He was selected for the 2019 Summer Universiade in Naples.

Khogali became national indoor champion when he won the 2022 British Indoor Athletics Championships with a jump of 7.54 metres. His second-best jump on the day would also have won him the title. In June of that year he jumped a 7.83m (+1.8) lifetime best to place third at the 2022 British Athletics Championships. He finished third overall in the long jump at the 2023 British Indoor Athletics Championships.

Khogali was runner-up in the long jump at the 2024 British Indoor Athletics Championships. In May 2024, he jumped a new personal best distance of 7.92 metres in Loughborough (+0.9 m/s).

Khogali won competing for England at the Loughborough International in May 2025, with a best jump of 7.80 metres. He was selected for the Great Britain squad for the long jump at the 2025 European Athletics Team Championships in Madrid in June 2025, placing eleventh overall with a jump of 7.69 metres, helping the Great Britain team to finish in fifth place overall. On 19 July, he jumped 7.19m for seventh place in the men's long jump at the 2025 London Athletics Meet, part of the 2025 Diamond League.

Khogali placed sixth at the 2026 British Indoor Athletics Championships in Birmingham in February 2026. In May, he set a new personal best of 7.93 metres (+1.4) competing in Athens at the Filathlitkos Kallitheas International Jumping Meeting. That month, he placed fourth in the long jump at the 2026 British Championships with 7.74 metres.
