= 2025 London Athletics Meet =

Athletics meeting in London, United Kingdom

- Dates: 19 July 2025
- Host city: London
- Venue: London Stadium
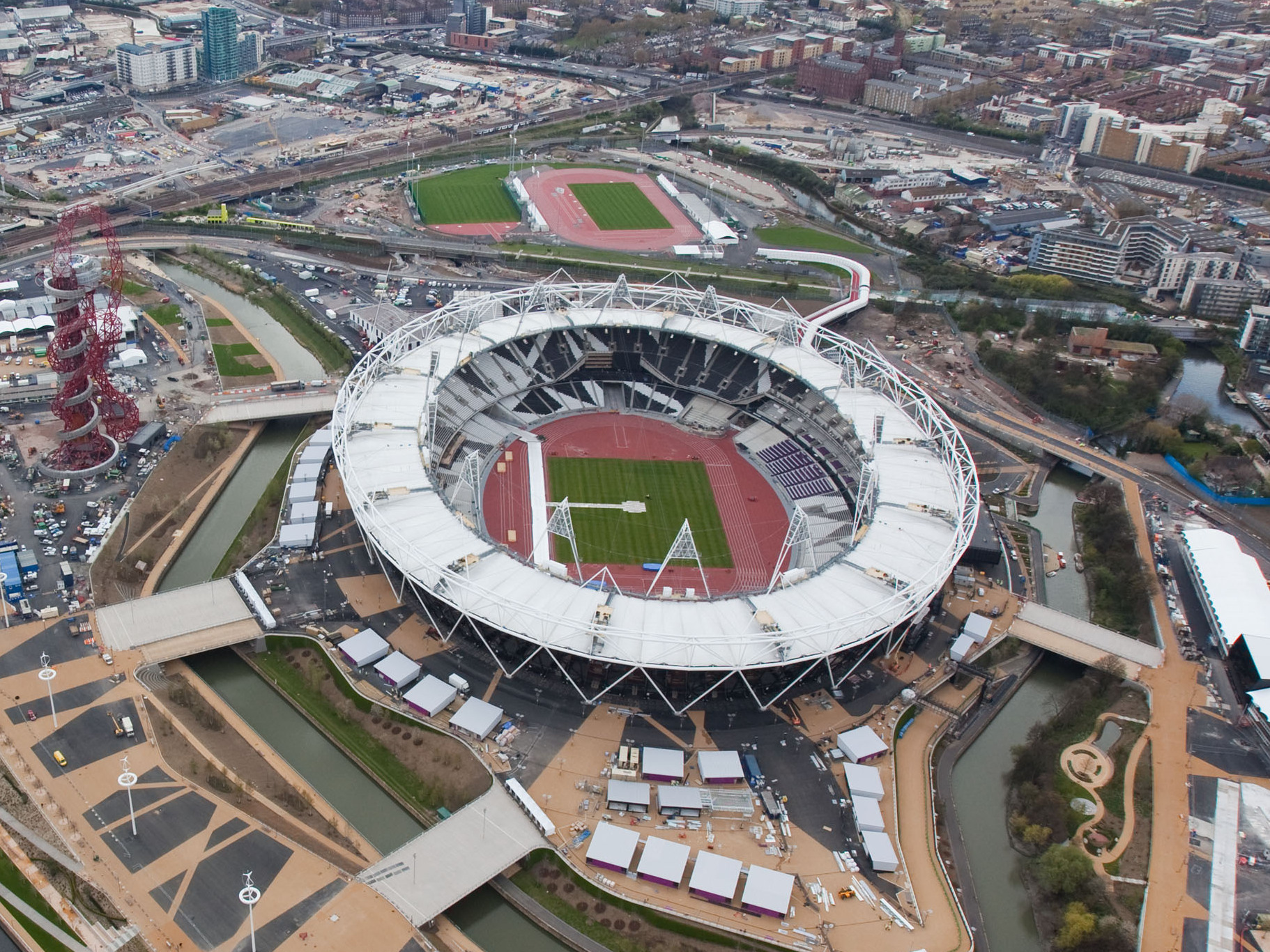
- Level: 2025 Diamond League

The 2025 London Athletics Meet was the 72nd edition of the annual outdoor track and field meeting held in London. Held on 19 July at London Stadium, it was the eleventh leg of the 2025 Diamond League – the highest level international track and field circuit.

== Diamond+ events results ==
Starting in 2025 a new discipline of events was added called Diamond+, these 4 events per meet awarded athletes with increased prize money whilst keeping the standard points format to qualify for the Diamond league finals. First place earns 8 points, with each step down in place earning one less point than the previous, until no points are awarded in 9th place or lower. In the case of a tie, each tying athlete earns the full amount of points for the place.

=== Men's ===
100 metres
Place	Athlete	Nation	Time	Points	Notes
1st place, gold medalist(s)	Oblique Seville	Jamaica	9.86	8	
2nd place, silver medalist(s)	Noah Lyles	United States	10.00	7	SB
3rd place, bronze medalist(s)	Zharnel Hughes	Great Britain	10.02	6	
4	Ackeem Blake	Jamaica	10.08	5	
5	Akani Simbine	South Africa	10.11 [.102]	4	
6	Jeremiah Azu	Great Britain	10.11 [.108]	3	
7	Letsile Tebogo	Botswana	10.12	2	
8	Louie Hinchliffe	Great Britain	10.21	1	
			Wind: (−0.6 m/s)		

1500 metres
Place	Athlete	Nation	Time	Points	Notes
1st place, gold medalist(s)	Phanuel Koech	Kenya	3:28.82	8	MR
2nd place, silver medalist(s)	Josh Kerr	Great Britain	3:29.37	7	SB
3rd place, bronze medalist(s)	Isaac Nader	Portugal	3:31.55	6	
4	Jake Wightman	Great Britain	3:31.58	5	SB
5	Jude Thomas	Australia	3:32.36	4	
6	Elliot Giles	Great Britain	3:32.51	3	
7	Narve Gilje Nordås	Norway	3:32.54	2	
8	Adam Spencer	Australia	3:32.88	1	SB
9	Selemon Barega	Ethiopia	3:32.93		PB
10	Neil Gourley	Great Britain	3:33.69		
11	Olli Hoare	Australia	3:34.03		
12	George Mills	Great Britain	4:18.37		
13	Cameron Myers	Australia	4:24.03		
14	Robert Farken	Germany	4:27.54		
—	Ben Claridge	Great Britain	DNF		PM
—	Žan Rudolf	Slovenia	DNF		PM

=== Women's ===
800 metres
Place	Athlete	Nation	Time	Points	Notes
1st place, gold medalist(s)	Georgia Hunter Bell	Great Britain	1:56.74	8	SB
2nd place, silver medalist(s)	Addison Wiley	United States	1:57.43	7	SB
3rd place, bronze medalist(s)	Halimah Nakaayi	Uganda	1:57.62	6	SB
4	Claudia Hollingsworth	Australia	1:58.02	5	PB
5	Shafiqua Maloney	Saint Vincent and the Grenadines	1:58.47	4	
6	Jemma Reekie	Great Britain	1:58.76	3	
7	Sarah Billings	Australia	1:58.99	2	
8	Natoya Goule-Toppin	Jamaica	1:59.27	1	
9	Anna Wielgosz	Poland	2:00.78		
10	Laura Muir	Great Britain	2:00.95		SB
—	Lisanne de Witte	Netherlands	DNF		PM

Pole vault
Place	Athlete	Nation	Height	Points	Notes
1st place, gold medalist(s)	Olivia McTaggart	New Zealand	4.73 m	8	PB
2nd place, silver medalist(s)	Katie Moon	United States	4.73 m	7	
3rd place, bronze medalist(s)	Angelica Moser	Switzerland	4.73 m	6	
4	Emily Grove	United States	4.73 m	5	=SB
5	Molly Caudery	Great Britain	4.60 m	4	
5	Amálie Švábíková	Czech Republic	4.60 m	4	
7	Tina Šutej	Slovenia	4.60 m	2	
8	Marie-Julie Bonnin	France	4.30 m	1	

== Diamond events results ==
=== Men's ===
400 metres
Place	Athlete	Nation	Time	Points	Notes
1st place, gold medalist(s)	Charlie Dobson	Great Britain	44.14	8	PB
2nd place, silver medalist(s)	Matthew Hudson-Smith	Great Britain	44.27	7	
3rd place, bronze medalist(s)	Zakithi Nene	South Africa	44.29	6	
4	Vernon Norwood	United States	44.34	5	SB
5	Busang Kebinatshipi	Botswana	44.51	4	=SB
6	Reece Holder	Australia	44.76	3	
7	Bayapo Ndori	Botswana	45.30	2	
8	Toby Harries	Great Britain	45.41	1	

800 metres
Place	Athlete	Nation	Time	Points	Notes
1st place, gold medalist(s)	Emmanuel Wanyonyi	Kenya	1:42.00	8	MR
2nd place, silver medalist(s)	Marco Arop	Canada	1:42.22	7	SB
3rd place, bronze medalist(s)	Max Burgin	Great Britain	1:42.36	6	PB
4	Bryce Hoppel	United States	1:42.71	5	SB
5	Mohamed Attaoui	Spain	1:43.01	4	
6	Donavan Brazier	United States	1:43.08	3	SB
7	Mark English	Ireland	1:44.07	2	
8	Andreas Kramer	Sweden	1:44.26	1	
9	Ethan Hussey	Great Britain	1:44.30		PB
10	Ben Pattison	Great Britain	1:46.08		SB
—	Patryk Sieradzki	Poland	DNF		PM

Long jump
Place	Athlete	Nation	Distance	Points	Notes
1st place, gold medalist(s)	Wayne Pinnock	Jamaica	8.20 m (+0.2 m/s)	8	
2nd place, silver medalist(s)	Miltiadis Tentoglou	Greece	8.19 m (+0.9 m/s)	7	
3rd place, bronze medalist(s)	Carey McLeod	Jamaica	8.10 m (+0.2 m/s)	6	
4	Mattia Furlani	Italy	8.05 m (+0.4 m/s)	5	
5	Simon Ehammer	Switzerland	8.03 m (+0.5 m/s)	4	
6	Liam Adcock	Australia	7.89 m (+1.1 m/s)	3	
7	Samuel Khogali	Great Britain	7.19 m (−0.9 m/s)	2	

Discus throw
Place	Athlete	Nation	Distance	Points	Notes
1st place, gold medalist(s)	Mykolas Alekna	Lithuania	71.70 m	8	DLR
2nd place, silver medalist(s)	Kristjan Čeh	Slovenia	68.83 m	7	
3rd place, bronze medalist(s)	Lawrence Okoye	Great Britain	67.24 m	6	
4	Daniel Ståhl	Sweden	66.62 m	5	
5	Rojé Stona	Jamaica	64.71 m	4	
6	Henrik Janssen	Germany	64.39 m	3	
7	Claudio Romero	Chile	60.21 m	2	
8	Nicholas Percy	Great Britain	58.89 m	1	

=== Women's ===
200 metres
Place	Athlete	Nation	Time	Points	Notes
1st place, gold medalist(s)	Julien Alfred	Saint Lucia	21.71	8	NR, MR, WL
2nd place, silver medalist(s)	Dina Asher-Smith	Great Britain	22.25	7	SB
3rd place, bronze medalist(s)	Amy Hunt	Great Britain	22.31	6	PB
4	Rhasidat Adeleke	Ireland	22.52	5	SB
5	Jaël Bestué	Spain	22.67	4	
6	Daryll Neita	Great Britain	22.69	3	SB
7	Ashanti Moore	Jamaica	22.86	2	
8	Torrie Lewis	Australia	23.05	1	
			Wind: (−0.6 m/s)		

Mile
Place	Athlete	Nation	Time	Points	Notes
1st place, gold medalist(s)	Gudaf Tsegay	Ethiopia	4:11.88	8	NR, MR, WL
2nd place, silver medalist(s)	Jessica Hull	Australia	4:13.68	7	AR
3rd place, bronze medalist(s)	Sarah Healy	Ireland	4:16.26	6	PB
4	Sinclaire Johnson	United States	4:16.32	5	AR
5	Marta Zenoni	Italy	4:17.16	4	NR
6	Agathe Guillemot	France	4:19.08	3	NR
7	Revée Walcott-Nolan	Great Britain	4:19.16	2	PB
8	Salomé Afonso	Portugal	4:19.51	1	NR
9	Linden Hall	Australia	4:19.58		PB
10	Birke Haylom	Ethiopia	4:19.74		SB
11	Gaia Sabbatini	Italy	4:19.83		PB
12	Esther Guerrero	Spain	4:20.12		NR
13	Weronika Lizakowska	Poland	4:20.19		PB
14	Erin Wallace	Great Britain	4:20.44		PB
15	Abbey Caldwell	Australia	4:20.74		SB
16	Katie Snowden	Great Britain	4:24.71		SB
—	Catriona Bisset	Australia	DNF		PM

5000 metres
Place	Athlete	Nation	Time	Points	Notes
1st place, gold medalist(s)	Medina Eisa	Ethiopia	14:30.57	8	
2nd place, silver medalist(s)	Fantaye Belayneh	Ethiopia	14:30.90	7	PB
3rd place, bronze medalist(s)	Rose Davies	Australia	14:31.45	6	AR
4	Fotyen Tesfay	Ethiopia	14:32.55	5	SB
5	Georgia Griffith	Australia	14:32.82	4	PB
6	Hirut Meshesha	Ethiopia	14:33.42	3	
7	Nozomi Tanaka	Japan	14:34.10	2	SB
8	Marta Alemayo	Ethiopia	14:34.46	1	PB
9	Margaret Akidor	Kenya	14:38.45		
10	Yenawa Nbret	Ethiopia	14:39.13		PB
11	Hannah Nuttall	Great Britain	14:39.48		PB
12	Innes FitzGerald	Great Britain	14:39.56		PB
13	Chaltu Dida	Ethiopia	14:39.64		
14	Jana Van Lent	Belgium	14:42.93		NR
15	Diane van Es	Netherlands	14:43.80		PB
16	Megan Keith	Great Britain	14:47.34		SB
—	Calli Thackery	Great Britain	DNF		PM
—	Alexandra Millard	Great Britain	DNF		PM

400 metres hurdles
Place	Athlete	Nation	Time	Points	Notes
1st place, gold medalist(s)	Femke Bol	Netherlands	52.10	8	
2nd place, silver medalist(s)	Jasmine Jones	United States	53.18	7	SB
3rd place, bronze medalist(s)	Andrenette Knight	Jamaica	53.79	6	
4	Gianna Woodruff	Panama	54.00	5	
5	Emma Zapletalová	Slovakia	54.08	4	NR
6	Lina Nielsen	Great Britain	55.04	3	
7	Daniela Ledecká	Slovakia	55.83	2	
8	Janieve Russell	Jamaica	1:00.55	1	

High jump
Place	Athlete	Nation	Height	Points	Notes
1st place, gold medalist(s)	Morgan Lake	Great Britain	1.96 m	8	=SB
2nd place, silver medalist(s)	Eleanor Patterson	Australia	1.93 m	7	
3rd place, bronze medalist(s)	Christina Honsel	Germany	1.93 m	6	
4	Yaroslava Mahuchikh	Ukraine	1.93 m	5	
5	Imke Onnen	Germany	1.89 m	4	
6	Elena Kulichenko	Cyprus	1.89 m	3	
7	Lamara Distin	Jamaica	1.85 m	2	
7	Charity Hufnagel	United States	1.85 m	2	

Long jump
Place	Athlete	Nation	Distance	Points	Notes
1st place, gold medalist(s)	Malaika Mihambo	Germany	6.93 m (−0.6 m/s)	8	
2nd place, silver medalist(s)	Larissa Iapichino	Italy	6.92 m (−0.5 m/s)	7	
3rd place, bronze medalist(s)	Hilary Kpatcha	France	6.86 m (−0.4 m/s)	6	
4	Claire Bryant	United States	6.78 m (+0.3 m/s)	5	
5	Monae' Nichols	United States	6.74 m (−0.1 m/s)	4	
6	Annik Kälin	Switzerland	6.72 m (−0.6 m/s)	3	
7	Jazmin Sawyers	Great Britain	6.63 m (−0.5 m/s)	2	
8	Katarina Johnson-Thompson	Great Britain	6.48 m (−0.6 m/s)	1	SB

== See also ==
- 2025 Diamond League
