= Cheyanne Evans-Gray =

British sprinter (born 1998)

Personal information
- Citizenship: British
- Born: 15 July 1998 (age 27)

Sport
- Country: Great Britain
- Sport: Running
- University team: East London
- Club: Croydon Harriers

Achievements and titles
- World finals: 2022 Indoor
- National finals: 2022 Indoor, 2025 Indoor
Medal record
Representing Great Britain
British Indoor Athletics Championships
| Gold medal – first place | 2022 Birmingham | 60m |
| Bronze medal – third place | 2025 Birmingham | 60m |

Cheyanne Evans-Gray (born 15 July 1998) is a British sprinter, who won the 60 metres event at the 2022 British Indoor Athletics Championships, and came third in the same event in 2025. She has been the British Universities and Colleges Sport record holder in the 60 metres event.

== Personal life ==
Evans-Gray has studied sports science at the University of East London. She worked at Ladbrokes until 2021, when she left to focus on her athletics career.

== Career ==
Evans-Gray gave up running, but at the age of 20, she rejoined Croydon Harriers athletics club. At the 2020 British Indoor Athletics Championships, she went out in the heats of the 60 metres event. That year, she won the 60 metres event at the British Universities and Colleges Sport championships in a record time of 7.28 seconds. After the event, she was the second highest ranked British woman in the event. Prior to the COVID-19 pandemic, Evans-Gray had been hoping to qualify for the 2020 World Athletics Indoor Championships, and to compete in the 100 metres trial event for the 2020 Summer Olympics.

Evans-Gray won the 60 metres event at the 2022 British Indoor Athletics Championships. She ran both the semi-final and final in a time of 7.25 seconds. She qualified for the 2022 World Athletics Indoor Championships, where she was eliminated in the semi-finals of the 60 metres event, despite setting a personal best time of 7.19 seconds. At the 2025 British Indoor Athletics Championships, Evans-Gray finished third in the 60 metres event.
