= Stephen Baffour =

Italian sprinter (born 2003)

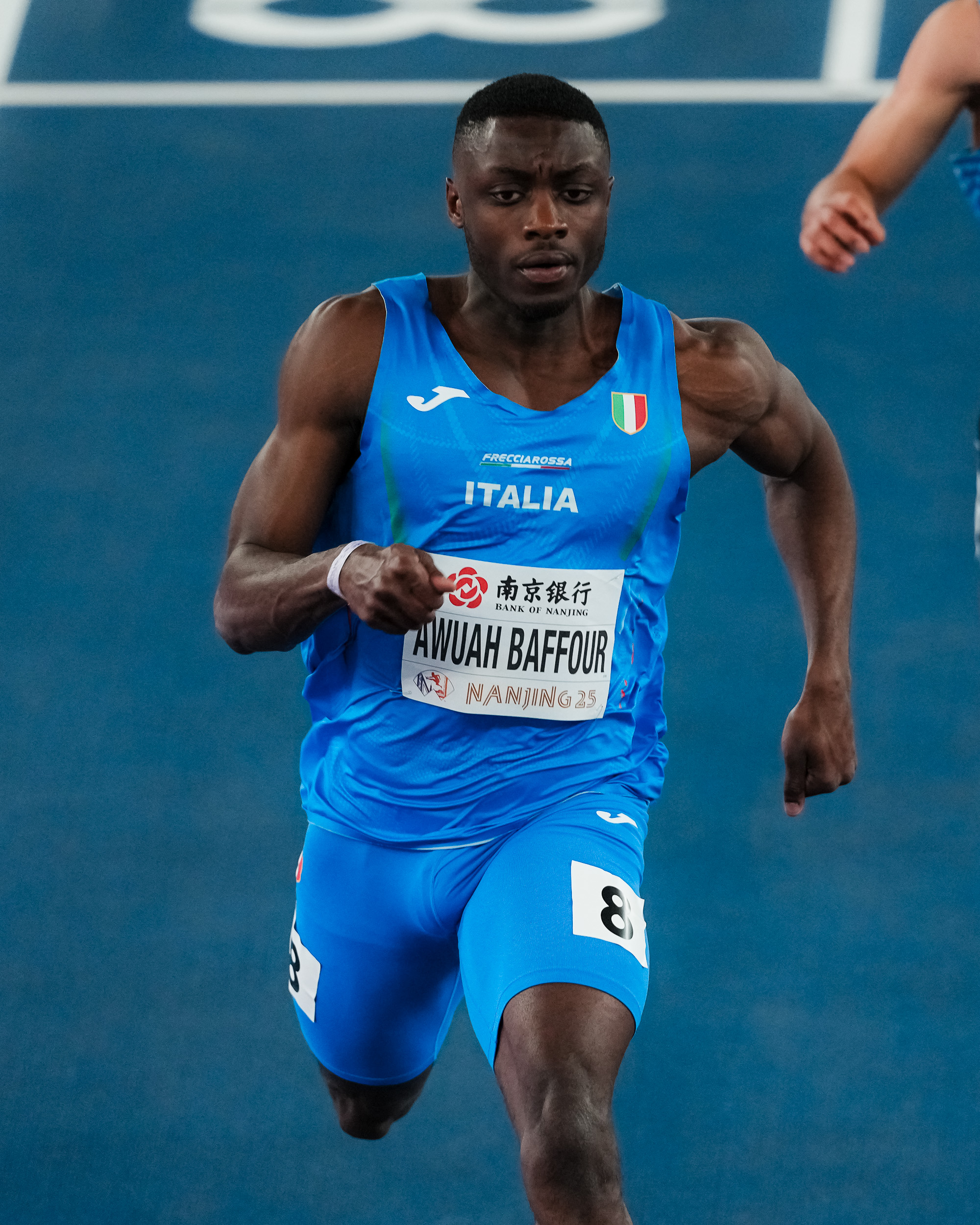
- Baffour at Nanjing 2025

Personal information
- Full name: Stephen Awuah Baffour
- Nationality: Italian
- Born: 9 November 2003 (age 22)

Sport
- Sport: Athletics
- Event: Sprint
- Club: Battaglio Cus Torino; Fiamme Gialle (2024- )
- Coached by: Ronnie Williams

Achievements and titles
- Personal bests: 60m: 6.61 (Belgrade , 2026); 100m: 10.17 (London, 2024); 200m: 20.71 (Rieti, 2024)

Stephen Awuah Baffour (born 9 November 2003) is an Italian sprinter. He competed at the 2025 World Athletics Indoor Championships.

== Early and personal life ==
He was born in Pomezia, Rome to Ghanaian parents. He later lived and trained in Coventry, England and studied at De Montfort University. He is also a member of Battaglio Cus Torino. He had the option of taking a British passport but chose to run for Italy with the support of the Italian federation.

== Career ==
He finished second in the 200 metres race at the 2023 British Indoor Athletics Championships, running 21.26 seconds.

=== 2024 ===
He won the 100 metres at the British Universities and Colleges Sport (BUCS) Championships in May 2024, running 10.44 seconds. He ran a personal best 10.29 seconds for the 100 metres at the Italian Athletics Championships in La Spezia in June 2024. In July, he lowered it to 10.24 to move to seventh on the Italian all-time U23 list. In August 2024, racing in London he lowered it again to 10.17 seconds. In 2024, he won winning two titles, over 100 metres and 200 metres, at the Italian U23 Championships.

=== 2025 ===
He finished second behind Yassin Bandaogo at the Italian Indoor Athletics Championships February 2025. He was selected for the Italian team for the 2025 European Athletics Indoor Championships in Apeldoorn, Netherlands, where he ran a personal best 6.65 seconds to qualify for the semi-finals. In his semi-final he ran 6.67 seconds but did not proceed to the final. He was selected for the 2025 World Athletics Indoor Championships in Nanjing, China in March 2025. He qualified for the semi-finals with a time of 6.66 seconds. In his semi-final he ran 6.67 seconds but did not progress through to the final. He competed at the 2025 World Athletics Relays in China in the Mixed 4 × 100 metres relay in May 2025.
