= Tapenisa Havea =

New Zealand shot putter (born 2003)

Personal information
- Born: 19 April 2003 (age 23)

Sport
- Country: New Zealand
- Sport: Athletics
- Event(s): Shot put, Discus

Achievements and titles
- Personal best(s): Shot put: 17.22 m (Flagstaff, 2026); Discus: 56.46 m (Tucson, 2025)

Tapenisa Havea (born 19 April 2003) is a New Zealand shot putter and discus thrower.

== Biography ==
From Christchurch, New Zealand, Havea is of Tongan descent. She competed in netball prior to taking up athletics and joining New Brighton Olympic Athletics Club. In 2017, she finished fourth in the 100 metres at the New Zealand Secondary Schools Championships, running 12.49 seconds. She later finished second in the U18 100m hurdles at the 2019 New Zealand Track & Field Championships. From 2020, she focused on throwing events.

Havea achieved second place in both the shot put and the discus throw at the New Zealand Athletics Championships in 2022. Havea placed fourth at the 2022 World Athletics U20 Championships in Cali, Colombia, equalling her personal best of 15.97 metres. Havea also placed seventh in the discus throw at the same championships with a throw of 50.97 metres.

Competing for the University of Arizona, Havea won the discus throw at the Willie Williams Classic in March 2025 in Tucson, Arizona, with a personal best throw of 56.46 metres, which came on her fifth throw of the competition. The distance moved Havea to fifth in the university’s all-time list for the event. She threw 16.67 metres in the shot put at the 2025 NCAA Division I Outdoor Track and Field Championships in Eugene, Oregon.

Havea opened her 2026 season with a throw 17.22 meters at the Friday Night Axe 'Em Open at Northern Arizona University in Flagstaff, on 9 January 2026. She subsequently qualified to make her NCAA Indoor debut at the 2026 NCAA Division I Indoor Track and Field Championships. In March 2026, she was named in the New Zealand team for the 2026 World Athletics Indoor Championships in Toruń, Poland, placing fifteenth overall. In May, Havea won the shot put with a season's best 16.11m at the Big 12 Championships.
