= Tom March =

British music industry executive

- Born: Thomas March; 1981 (age 44–45); London
- Occupation: Music industry executive
- Employer: Capitol Music Group
- Title: Chairman and CEO
- Awards: BRIT Award; Billboard International Power Players; Billboard Power 100

Tom March is a British music industry executive. The CEO and chairman of Capitol Music Group, he oversees Capitol Records, Blue Note Records, Motown, Astralwerks, Harvest Records, and Capitol Christian Music Group.

March was previously the president of Geffen Records; the co-president of Polydor Records; the general manager of Virgin EMI UK; and the head of marketing at Island UK. He has worked with artists including Lana Del Rey, Doechii, Billie Eilish, Florence and the Machine, Lorde, Olivia Rodrigo, The Rolling Stones, Royel Otis, Leon Thomas, Queen, and Yungblud.

== Early life ==
March was born in London. He was classically trained on viola, violin, and piano. He was obsessed with pop and dance music as a teenager.

== Career ==
=== 2002-2016: Darling Department, Island, Virgin ===
March began his career as a dance music publicist at the London-based PR firm Darling Department, where he worked with Fatboy Slim, Mylo, Röyksopp, and The Chemical Brothers, among others. He first met Ben Mortimer—then a journalist at The Face—while at Darling.

In 2006, he was hired as a junior product manager at Island Records. In 2008, with his boss, Island co-president Ted Cockle, he won Music Week's Artist Marketing Campaign of the Year for Mika's multiplatinum debut, Life in Cartoon Motion. His marketing campaigns for Florence and the Machine, Jessie J, James Bay, and Queen were later nominated for the Artist Marketing Campaign of the Year award. Several of the artists he worked with were signed by Mortimer, who joined Island as an A&R rep at around the same time that that March was hired.

In early 2013 Cockle was appointed president of the newly launched Virgin EMI Records. He recruited March—by then, the head of marketing at Island—and in April 2013 he was appointed general manager of Virgin. He was at Virgin for three years, during which the label had significant success with records by artists including Avicii, Lorde, Queen and Paul Weller.

=== 2016-2022: Polydor, BRITS ===
In May 2016 March and Mortimer were reunited as co-presidents of Polydor. At 31, March became the youngest person in the history of the UK music industry to run a major label. When his appointment was announced, March said he and Mortimer would "take risks and break records." Over the next four years, Polydor had a #1 album with Sam Fender, a Top 3 debut with Mabel, a #1 album with Billie Eilish's debut, three consecutive #1 Eminem albums and two consecutive #1 Lana Del Rey albums. The Glass Animals song ''Heat Waves" hit #1 on the Billboard year-end Hot 100 and Global 200 charts. Polydor won Record Company Of The Year at the Music Week Awards three years in a row. Variety reported that March "made the label one of the top imprints in the U.K."

March was the executive producer and showrunner for the BRIT Awards in 2022. Under his auspices, gender-based categories were removed and Alternative/Rock Act, Hip-Hop/Grime/Rap Act, Dance Act and Pop/R&B Act awards were introduced. Unlike other BRIT awards, which were decided by the BRITS Academy, the newly added genre awards were determined by public votes. Best British Single was renamed Song of the Year and for the first time included featured artists, and honorary Producer Of The Year and Songwriter Of The Year awards were added. Among others, he booked Adele, Liam Gallagher, and Ed Sheeran for the 2022 broadcast.

=== 2022-present: Geffen Records, Capitol Music Group ===
In March 2022 he was appointed president of the newly relaunched Geffen Records by John Janick, the chairman and CEO of Universal's Interscope Geffen A&M label group. March and Janick worked together at Polydor, which was also owned by Universal. Over the following two years the label had hit records with artists including Rodrigo—who March first worked with at Polydor -- Kali Uchis, JK, V, Yeat, and The Rolling Stones.

In February 2024, Janick appointed March chair and CEO of Capitol Music Group. In 2025, CMG artists received 36 Grammy nominations. March worked extensively with nominees including Doechii, who was the third woman to win the Grammy for Best Rap Album, and Leon Thomas, who received Best New Artist and Album and Song of the Year nominations for his album Mutt and its title track. He also worked closely with Yungblud, who was nominated in 2025 for 2026 Grammys in the Best Rock Album, Best Rock Song, and Best Rock Performance categories.
