= Holly Archer =

British middle-distance runner

Personal information
- Nationality: British
- Born: 7 November 1993 (age 32)

Sport
- Sport: Athletics
- Event: 1500 metres
Medal record
Women's athletics
Representing Great Britain
European Indoor Championships
Silver medal – second place	2021 Toruń	1500 m

Holly Archer (born 7 November 1993) is a British athlete. She competed in the women's 1500 metres event at the 2021 European Athletics Indoor Championships, where she won the silver medal.

== International competitions ==
Year	Competition	Venue	Position	Notes
Representing Great Britain / England
2021	European Indoor Championships	Toruń, Poland	2nd	1500 m
(q) indicates overall position in qualifying round

Note: Archer was initially disqualified in the final of the 1500 m at the 2021 Athletics European Indoor Championships due to jostling, the disqualification was overturned on appeal
