= Yassin Bandaogo =

Italian athlete (born 2004)

Personal information
- Nationality: Italian
- Born: 6 January 2004 (age 22)

Sport
- Sport: Athletics
- Event: Sprint

Achievements and titles
- Personal best(s): 60m: 6.63 (Ancona, 2025); 100m: 10.51 (Jerusalem, 2023)

Yassin Bandaogo (born 6 January 2004) is an Italian sprinter. He won the Italian Indoor Athletics Championships in 2025 over 60 metres and competed at the 2025 World Athletics Indoor Championships.

== Career ==
A keen footballer in his youth, he later focused solely on athletics, beginning his training in Breganze under coach Antonio Lazzarettoz. He went on to win Italian national titles across various age-group categories and became a member of Atletica Vicentina under Umberto Pegoraro, as well as joining the sports group Fiamme Oro. In 2023, he competed at the European Athletics U20 Championships in Jerusalem, Israel, where he reached the semi-finals of the 100 metres race.

He ran a personal best of 6.63 seconds in the 60 metres to win the Italian U23 Championships in early 2025, just five hundredths from the Italian U23 record set by Filippo Tortu in 2019. He won the Italian Indoor Athletics Championships in 2025 over 60 metres in February 2025, with a time of 6.69 seconds, beating Stephen Awuah Baffour and Samuele Ceccarelli by a hundredth of a second.

He was selected as a member of the Italian team for the 2025 World Athletics Indoor Championships in Nanjing, China, in March 2025. Competing at the championships, he ran his 60 metres heat in a time 6.74 seconds but did not progress through to the semi-final, missing out on a spot as a fastest non-automatic qualifier by seven hundredths of a second.

== Personal life ==
He is from Thiene in the province of Vicenza in the Veneto region of Italy. His parents are originally from Burkino Faso before they emigrated to Italy. He is a Muslim.
