= Ronald Korir =

Kenyan long-distance runner (born 1991)

Personal information
- Nationality: Kenyan
- Born: Ronald Kipkoech Korir; April 10, 1991 (age 35) Kenya
- Occupation: Long-distance runner
- Years active: 2013–present

Sport
- Country: Kenya
- Sport: Athletics
- Event: Marathon

Achievements and titles
- Personal bests: Marathon: 2:04:22 (Berlin, 2023)

Ronald Kipkoech Korir (born 10 April 1991) is a Kenyan long-distance runner who competes in the marathon. A top-tier elite marathoner, his career is highlighted by a sub-2:05 personal best at the Berlin Marathon.

== Career ==
Korir began competing internationally around 2013, showing early promise with a sixth-place finish at the 2014 Frankfurt Marathon in 2:07:29. He remained a consistent performer in various international marathons for several years.

After an eighth-place finish at the 2022 Valencia Marathon in 2:05:37, Korir delivered a major breakthrough at the 2023 Berlin Marathon. Competing against a world-class field, he shattered his personal best by over a minute, finishing fourth with a time of 2:04:22. This result established him as one of the world's fastest marathon runners. He followed this with another fourth-place finish at the 2024 Hamburg Marathon.

== Anti-doping violation ==
In May 2025, the Athletics Integrity Unit (AIU) announced that Korir had been provisionally suspended for the presence or use of Triamcinolone Acetonide, a prohibited substance.

== Personal bests ==
- Marathon: 2:04:22 – Berlin, Germany, 2023
- Half Marathon: 1:02:54 – Rabat, Morocco, 2013

== Major results ==
Year	Competition	Location	Position	Time
2014	Frankfurt Marathon	Frankfurt, Germany	6th	2:07:29
2022	Valencia Marathon	Valencia, Spain	8th	2:05:37
2023	Berlin Marathon	Berlin, Germany	4th	2:04:22
2024	Hamburg Marathon	Hamburg, Germany	4th	2:05:41
