= Laura Zialor =

English high jumper

Personal information
- Nationality: British (English)
- Born: 4 August 1998 (age 27) Buckinghamshire, England

Sport
- Sport: Athletics
- Event: High jump
- Club: Marshall Milton Keynes

Laura Zialor (born 4 August 1998) is an English international athlete. In 2022, she represented Great Britain at the World Championships and European Championships, and England at the Commonwealth Games.

== Biography ==
Zialor was educated at the University of Birmingham and won the British indoor high jump title in 2022. She recorded a personal best of 1.91 metres in May 2022. She had previously won the silver medal at the 2021 British Athletics Championships.

In 2022, she was selected for the women's high jump event at the 2022 Commonwealth Games in Birmingham.

In 2023, she was selected for the British team for the 2023 European Athletics Team Championships held in Chorzów, Silesia, Poland between 20 and 25 June 2023. Unfortunately, she injured her Achilles whilst competing at the event and had to crowdfund to cover the cost of private surgery as UK Athletics claimed to not be liable, a loophole Zialor campaigned to change.
