= Keeley O'Hagan =

New Zealand high jumper

Personal information
- Nationality: New Zealand
- Born: 11 March 1994 (age 31) Ōtaki, New Zealand

Sport
- Country: New Zealand
- Sport: Athletics
- Event: High jump
- Club: Christchurch Old Boys United AC
- Coached by: Terry Lomax

Achievements and titles
- National finals: High jump champion (2015, 2018, 2022)

Keeley O'Hagan (born 11 March 1994) is a New Zealand high jumper. She has represented New Zealand at multiple international competitions, including the Commonwealth Games and the Universiade, and has won several national titles.

== Early life ==
O'Hagan grew up in Ōtaki, New Zealand. She showed early promise in athletics, clearing 1.82 meters in the high jump at the age of 15. She represented New Zealand at the 2010 World Junior Championships in Athletics and the 2011 World Youth Championships.

== Career ==
In 2015, O'Hagan competed at the 2015 Summer Universiade in Gwangju, finishing eighth in the high jump with a clearance of 1.75 meters.

She achieved a personal best of 1.89 meters at the 2022 Commonwealth Games in Birmingham, placing sixth in the final.

In 2024, O'Hagan won the high jump at the 2024 Oceania Athletics Championships in Suva, Fiji, equaling the championship record with a clearance of 1.86 meters.

== Personal life ==
O'Hagan is coached by Terry Lomax and represents the Christchurch Old Boys United Athletics Club. She relocated from Wellington to Christchurch to train under Lomax, a decision that contributed to her improved performances.

== Personal bests ==
- High jump: 1.89 m (Birmingham, 6 August 2022)
- Long jump: 5.55 m (Timaru, 12 December 2009)
