= Emily Borthwick =

British high jumper (born 1997)

Personal information
- Full name: Emily Jane Borthwick
- Born: 2 September 1997 (age 28) Worthing, West Sussex, England

Sport
- Country: Great Britain
- Sport: Track and Field
- Event: high jump

Emily Jane Borthwick (born 2 September 1997) is a British high jumper. She competed at the 2020 Olympic Games and 2022 World Athletics Championships.

== Career ==
Borthwick finished third at the 2020 British Athletics Championships in the high jump. In March 2021, she was selected for the Great Britain and Northern Ireland team to compete at the 2021 European Athletics Indoor Championships, held in Toruń, Poland. At the event she secured a new personal best with a third-time clearance at 1.91 metres to qualify for the final of the women’s high jump, where she ultimately finished in eighth place overall.

After again finishing third in the British Athletics Championships in 2021, Borthwick was added to the British squad for the delayed 2020 Summer Games in Tokyo which caused unrest in the GB camp as she had not officially qualified by hitting the standard like the rest of the team. Borthwick finished 16th in the Olympic qualifying round equalling her previous lifetime best of 1.93m in the process. She went on to set a new personal best of 1.95m at The Bronze World Tour event in Hustopece, Czech Republic in February 2022. She competed at the 2022 World Athletics Championships in Eugene, Oregon and placed eleventh at the 2022 Commonwealth Games in Birmingham, England.

She finished runner-up to Morgan Lake with a jump of 1.84 metres at the 2025 British Indoor Athletics Championships in Birmingham, on 23 February 2025. She was selected for the 2025 European Athletics Team Championships in Madrid in June 2025.

== Personal life ==
From Wigan, Greater Manchester, her father Darren is an athletics coach. In November 2021, Borthwick lost her brother Connor Borthwick who was killed in an industrial accident in Blackburn, Lancashire. She completed a masters degree from Loughborough University. She later relocated to Australia and became engaged.
