= Westfield School, Sheffield =

Foundation school in Sheffield, South Yorkshire, England

Westfield School
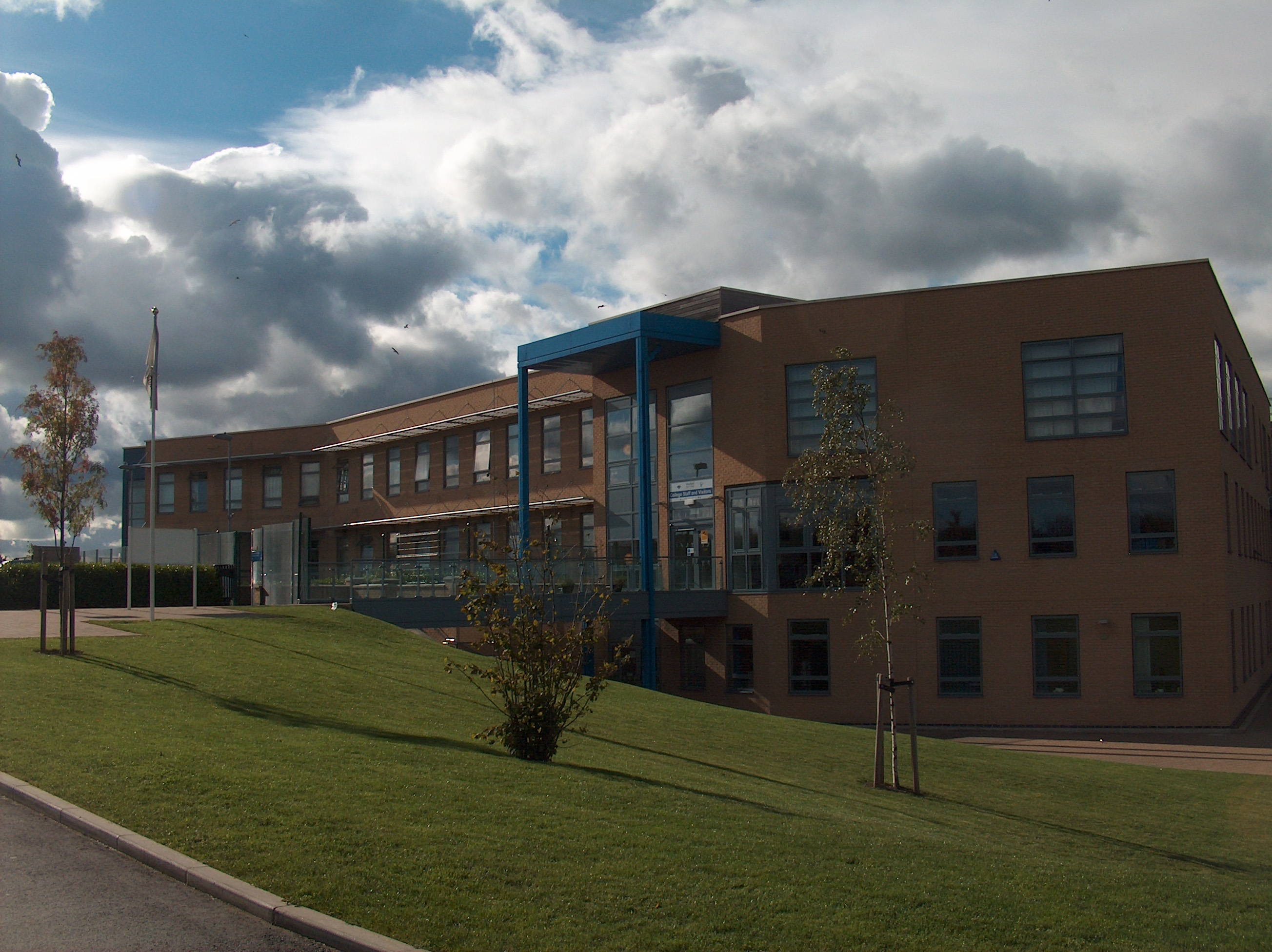
- Westfield School

Location
- Eckington Road; Sothall; Sheffield, S20 1HQ; England; 53.3365°N 1.342°W

Information
- Type: Academy
- Established: 1957
- Local authority: City of Sheffield
- Trust: Chorus Education Trust
- Department for Education URN: 145562 Tables
- Ofsted: Reports
- Headteacher: Gaynor Jones
- Staff: 98 (fte)
- Gender: Mixed
- Age: 11 to 16
- Enrolment: 1327
- Capacity: 1350
- Public transport: B Waterthorpe
- Website: www.westfield.chorustrust.org

Westfield School is a mixed secondary school located in Sheffield, South Yorkshire, England. On 1 December 2018 it joined Chorus Education Trust, a local multi-academy trust founded by Silverdale School in Sheffield. The school was a specialist Sports College but removed this title from the name in June 2013. It serves an area on the south east edge of Sheffield where many people work in service industries and where levels of prosperity range from above to below average.

== History ==
=== Eckington Grammar School ===
Westfield School is the successor to Eckington County Secondary School which opened in 1930 in Halfway, which was then in Derbyshire. It became Eckington Grammar School in the early 1940s.

=== Comprehensive school ===
Westfield Comprehensive School came into existence in 1957 as the first comprehensive school in Derbyshire. There were two sites, a new site on Westfield Crescent (53.33°N 1.36°W) in Mosborough and the existing Eckington Grammar School, which became the Lower School. Frank Rollinson, who had been appointed headmaster of the Grammar School in 1953, oversaw its conversion into a comprehensive school.

In 1967 Sheffield extended its administrative boundaries to include Mosborough. After peaking at just under 2000 in 1977, Westfield's roll declined in the 1980s and the lower school at Halfway was demolished in 1989.

On 1 December 2018, Westfield joined Chorus Education Trust, led by Silverdale School in Sheffield. A new headteacher, Joe Birkbeck, was appointed. As of 2026, the headteacher is Gaynor Jones.

== New building ==
Westfield School campus, on Westfield Crescent in Mosborough, was closed in December 2006, and the new building opened in January 2007. Westfield Secondary School is one of four schools under the Sheffield Schools Private finance initiative project. Kier Managed Services Ltd were awarded the 25-year contract for the facilities management of the school, as part of the PFI project. The new school, situated on Eckington Road behind the Waterthorpe tram stop in Sothall, is roughly two miles from its predecessor. On 1 May 2007, the new school campus was officially opened by Gordon Brown MP, who, at the time, was Chancellor of the Exchequer. He released a net of balloons to mark the opening of the school.

== The Vikki Orvice Library ==
The new school building included a library but this was converted into a ICT suite. In October 2019 this was converted back into a library, which was opened by children's author and comedian, David Baddiel. The library is named after sports journalist and former Westfield student, Vikki Orvice.

== Academic performance ==
Like most secondary schools in Sheffield, it does not have a sixth form, but Westfield students have priority access into Silverdale School sixth form (part of Chorus Education Trust).

In 2014, the school received an Ofsted judgement of Requires Improvement. As of 2026, the most recent inspection was in 2023, also with a judgement of Requires Improvement.

== Notable former pupils ==
=== Eckington Grammar School ===
- Air Vice-Marshal Eric Plumtree CB OBE DFC became Station Commander RAF Leuchars 1959–61

=== Westfield School ===
- Neil Warnock – Football Manager
- Katie Summerhayes – Freestyle Skier & Olympian
- Kyle McFadzean – Footballer
- Callum McFadzean - Footballer
- Ellie Roebuck – Footballer for England and Man City
- Vikki Orvice – sports journalist
- Oliver Arblaster - Footballer
- Scott Pollock - Football
- Harold Cartwright - Cricketer
