= Jake Wightman =

British middle-distance runner (born 1994)

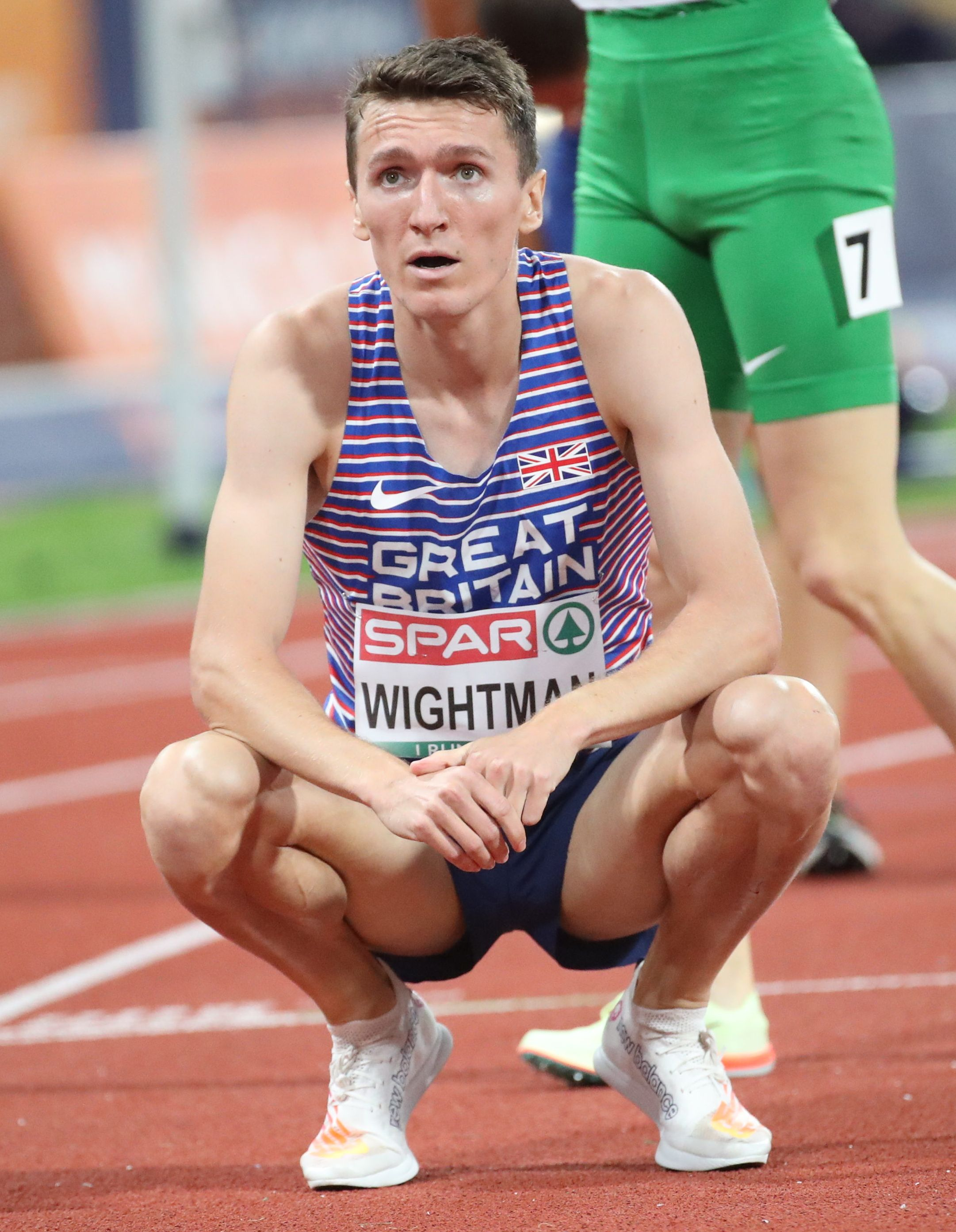
- Wightman at the 2022 European Athletics Championships in Munich

Personal information
- Born: 11 July 1994 (age 32) Nottingham, England
- Education: Loughborough University
- Height: 1.82 m (6 ft 0 in)
- Weight: 67 kg (148 lb)

Sport
- Country: Great Britain & N.I. Scotland
- Sport: Athletics
- Event: Middle-distance running
- Club: Edinburgh AC
- Coached by: John Hartigan.

Achievements and titles
- Personal bests: 800 m: 1:43.65 (Brussels 2022); 1000 m: 2:12.77 (Monaco 2026); 1500 m: 3:29.23 (Eugene 2022); Mile: 3:47.82 (Eugene 2025)
Medal record
Men's athletics
Representing Great Britain
World Championships
Gold medal – first place	2022 Eugene	1500 m
Silver medal – second place	2025 Tokyo	1500 m
European Championships
Silver medal – second place	2022 Munich	800 m
Bronze medal – third place	2018 Berlin	1500 m
European U20 Championships
Gold medal – first place	2013 Rieti	1500 m
Representing Scotland
Commonwealth Games
Bronze medal – third place	2018 Gold Coast	1500 m
Bronze medal – third place	2022 Birmingham	1500 m

Jake Wightman (born 11 July 1994) is a British middle-distance runner who competes mainly in the 1500 metres. He won the gold medal at the 2022 World Championships, the first global gold in a middle-distance event for a British male since Seb Coe's 1500 m title at the 1984 Los Angeles Olympics. At the European Athletics Championships, Wightman earned a bronze in 2018 and a silver for the 800 metres in 2022. He won bronze medals at the 2018 and 2022 Commonwealth Games. Sidelined by injury in the two years immediately after his world title, in his comeback year Wightman won the silver medal in the 1500 metres at the 2025 World Athletic Championships, becoming the first British athlete to medal twice in the event at the World Championships..

He holds two Scottish records (800 m and 1000 m) and is a two-time British champion.

== Career ==
As a junior athlete, Wightman was the 2013 European Under-20 champion in the 1500 metres.

In April 2018, he won his first major senior medal, with bronze for the 1500 m at the Gold Coast Commonwealth Games, where he also finished fourth in the 800 m. In June, he set a Scottish record for the 1000 m with a time of 2:16.27 at the Diamond League meeting in Stockholm, breaking the previous record which had stood since 1984. Wightman took bronze in the 1500 m at the Berlin European Athletics Championships in August. That year he became the first Briton to run below 1:45 in the 800 m and 3:35 in the 1500 m since Peter Elliott in 1991.

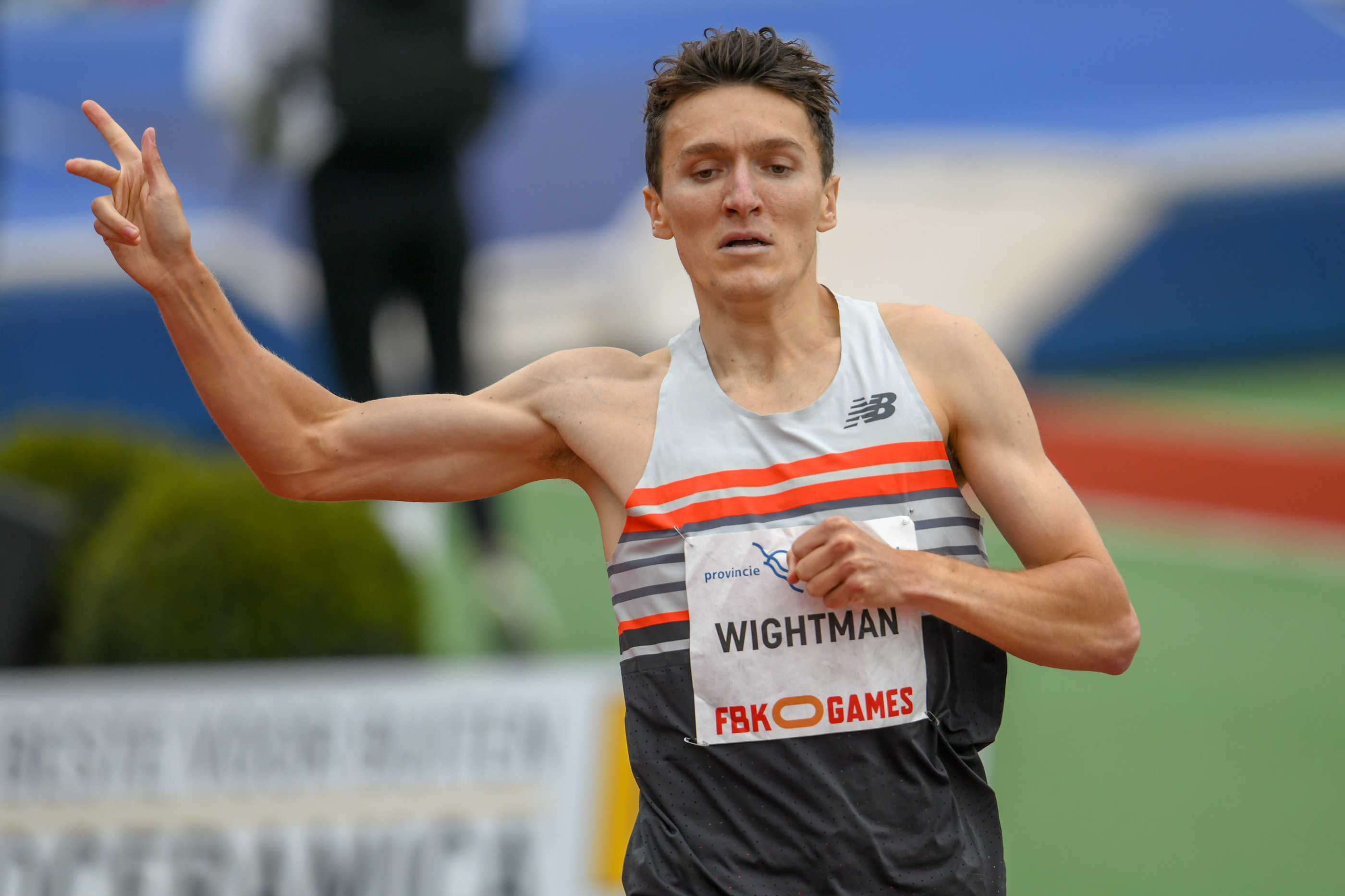
Jake Wightman at the 2021 FBK Games in Hengelo

The 25-year-old placed fifth in the 1500 m at the 2019 World Athletics Championships held in Doha, Qatar, running 3:31.87 in the final.

In 2020, Wightman broke the Scottish 1500 m record with a time of 3:29.47, finishing in third place at the Monaco Diamond League.

At the postponed 2020 Tokyo Olympics in 2021, he placed 10th in the event in a time of 3:35.09.

=== 2022: World 1500 m champion ===
Wightman won the gold medal in the 1500 m event at the World Championships in Eugene, Oregon in July with a personal best and world-leading time of 3:29.23, beating reigning Olympic champion and European record holder Jakob Ingebrigtsen (3:29.47). It was the first British world 1500 m title since Steve Cram in 1983, the first Scottish world title on the track since Liz McColgan's 10,000 m gold in 1991, and ended a streak of seven consecutive golds in the event from Kenya-born runners. The mark moved him to third on the UK all-time list. His father, Geoff Wightman, former marathoner and long-time media commentator, called the race as in-stadium commentator.

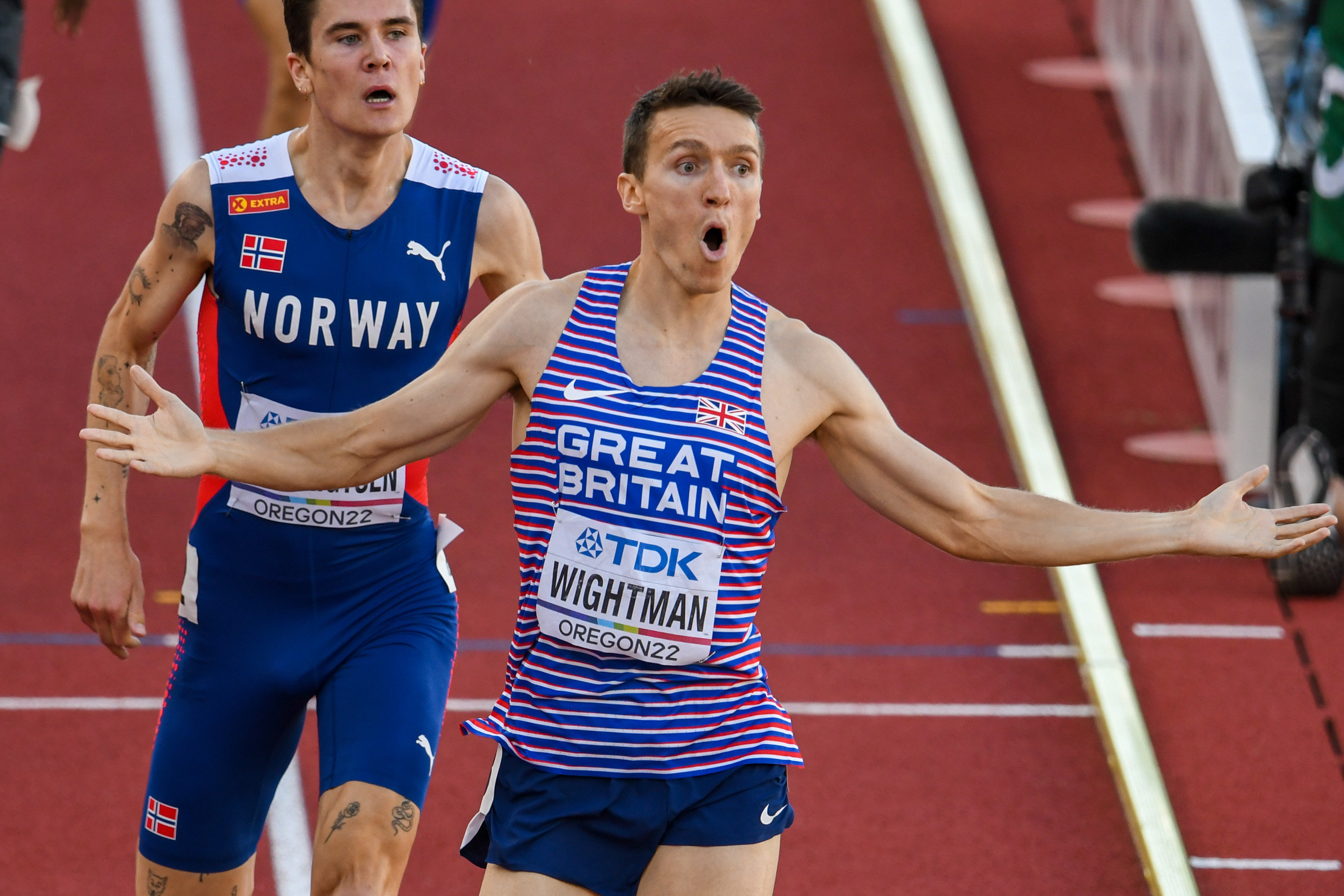
Wightman winning gold at the 2022 World Championships in Eugene

Wightman continued his good form in August by taking a bronze in his specialist event at the Commonwealth Games Birmingham 2022, and a silver for the 800 m at the European Championships held in Munich.

In September, he broke the 1:44-barrier in the 800 m for the first time, improving Tom McKean’s 33-year-old Scottish record of 1:43.88 in his fifth overall Diamond League victory with a time of 1:43.65 in Brussels. He capped his breakthrough season on the road a few days later, winning for the third time the Fifth Avenue Mile in New York (he also won in 2018 and 2021).

Across the season, Wightman set also Scottish records in the 1000 m and one mile, as well as revised his personal bests in the indoor 3000 m and road mile. He was named by Sports Journalists' Association Sportsman of the Year, while British Athletics Writers' Association awarded him John Rodda Award for British Male Athlete of the Year for the second time, among others.

=== 2023–2024: Injuries ===
Going into the 2023 season, Wightman had aimed to defend his 1500 m title at the World Championships in Budapest. However, in January, after sustaining a foot injury, he spent 5 weeks in a boot and cross-trained. Wightman was able to run by the spring, aiming to be ready for Budapest. He was able to skip qualification given his status as the reigning world champion. However, after numerous achilles, shin, and hamstring issues, he withdrew from the World Championships. In his absence, his childhood schoolmate and club colleague, Josh Kerr, succeeded him as world champion in the 1500 metres.

In 2024, after missing the British Championships due to a calf injury, Wightman was selected to represent Great Britain in the 800 metres at the Paris Olympics. He pulled out just days before he was scheduled to race because of a hamstring injury. In autumn, Wightman made the decision to switch his training base from Teddington to Manchester so he could be closer to his physiotherapist.

=== 2025–present ===
In March 2025, Wightman announced he would no longer be coached by his father Geoff. He is now coached by John Hartigan. In September 2025, Wightman won a silver medal in the 1500 metres at the 2025 World Athletic Championships.

On 10 July 2026, at the Monaco Diamond League, Wightman improved his Scottish record in the 1000 metres to 2:12.77, finishing second to Emmanuel Wanyonyi, who set a new world record of 2:11.83.

== Personal life ==
Wightman attended Stewart's Melville College and Fettes College, both independent schools in Edinburgh, before studying at Loughborough University. Although born in England, Wightman moved to Linlithgow as a child and represents Scotland internationally.

Wightman has a twin brother. His father and coach Geoff Wightman represented England in the marathon at the 1990 Commonwealth Games in Auckland, whilst his mother Susan Tooby and his aunt Angela Tooby represented Great Britain at the Summer Olympics Seoul 1988.

Wightman is engaged to former Irish international middle-distance runner Georgie Hartigan.

== Achievements ==
=== International competitions ===
Representing Great Britain & Scotland
Year	Competition	Venue	Position	Event	Time
2013	European Junior Championships	Rieti, Italy	1st	1500 m	3:44.14
2014	Commonwealth Games	Glasgow, Scotland	16th (h)	1500 m	3:43.87
2016	European Championships	Amsterdam, Netherlands	7th	1500 m	3:47.68
2017	World Championships	London, United Kingdom	20th (sf)	1500 m	3:41.79
2018	World Indoor Championships	Birmingham, United Kingdom	6th	1500 m	3:58.91
2018	Commonwealth Games	Gold Coast, Australia	4th	800 m	1:45.82
2018	Commonwealth Games	Gold Coast, Australia	3rd	1500 m	3:35.97
2018	European Championships	Berlin, Germany	3rd	1500 m	3:38.25
2019	World Championships	Doha, Qatar	5th	1500 m	3:31.87
2021	Olympic Games	Tokyo, Japan	10th	1500 m	3:35.09
2022	World Championships	Eugene, OR, United States	1st	1500 m	3:29.23
2022	Commonwealth Games	Birmingham, United Kingdom	3rd	1500 m	3:30.53
2022	European Championships	Munich, Germany	2nd	800 m	1:44.91
2025	World Championships	Tokyo, Japan	2nd	1500 m	3:34.12
2026	Commonwealth Games	Glasgow, United Kingdom	6th	Mile	3:56.36
2026	European Championships	Birmingham, United Kingdom	6th	1500 m	3:37.18
2026	World Ultimate Championship	Budapest, Hungary	9th	1500 m	3:31.56

=== Circuit wins, National titles ===
- Diamond League
  - 2017 (2): Oslo Bislett Games (1500m, PB), Birmingham Grand Prix (Mile)
  - 2022 (3): Rabat Meeting International Mohammed VI d'Athlétisme (1500m), Monaco Herculis (1000m, MR PB), Brussels Memorial Van Damme (800m, NRS)
- British Athletics Championships
  - 1500 metres: 2022
- British Indoor Athletics Championships
  - 1500 metres: 2018

=== Personal bests ===
- 800 metres – 1:43.65 (Brussels 2022) (NR Scottish)
  - 800 metres indoor – 1:47.69 (Glasgow 2018)
- 1000 metres – 2:12.77 (Monaco 2026) (NR Scottish)
  - 1000 metres indoor – 2:17.51 (Boston 2020)
- 1500 metres – 3:29.23 (Eugene 2022)
  - 1500 metres indoor – 3:34.06 (Boston 2024)
- Mile – 3:50.30 (Oslo 2022) (NR Scottish)
  - Mile indoor – 3:57.24 (Boston 2020)
  - Mile road – 3:50.0 (not legal) (New York City 2021)
- 3000 metres indoor – 7:37.81 (New York City 2022)
- 5k road - 13:52 (Leicester 2024)

== Awards ==
- British Athletics Writers' Association
  - John Rodda Award for British Male Athlete of the Year: 2020, 2022
- Sports Journalists' Association
  - Sportsman of the Year: 2022
- Scottish Athletics
  - Athlete of the Year: 2022
  - Performer of the Year: 2020 (with Laura Muir and Jemma Reekie)
- Scottish Sports Awards
  - Male Athlete of the Year: 2022
- Athletics Weekly
  - British Male Athlete of the Year: 2022
- British Milers' Club
  - BMC Male Athlete of the Year: 2022
