= Katarina Johnson-Thompson =

British heptathlete (born 1993)

Katarina Johnson-Thompson MBE
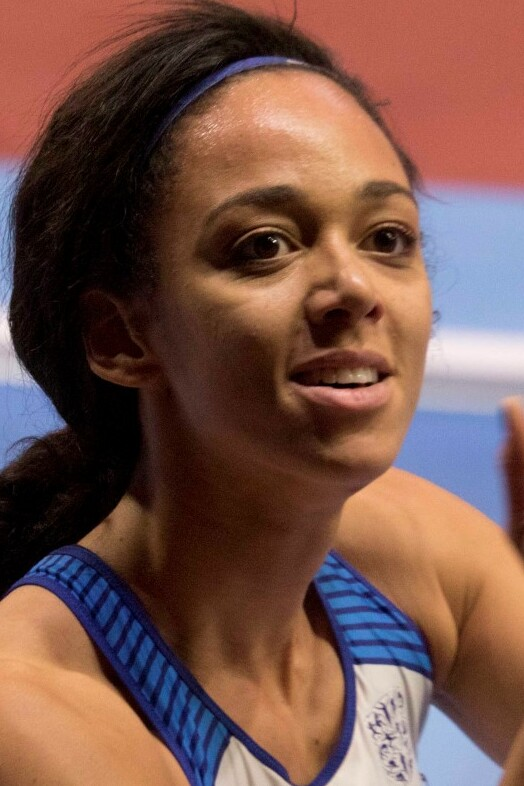
- Johnson-Thompson in March 2018

Personal information
- Nickname: KJT
- Born: 9 January 1993 (age 33) Liverpool, England
- Height: 1.83 m (6 ft 0 in)
- Weight: 68 kg (150 lb)

Sport
- Sport: Athletics
- Events: Heptathlon, Pentathlon
- Club: Liverpool Harriers
- Coached by: Aston Moore

Achievements and titles
- Personal bests: Heptathlon: 6981 NR (Doha 2019); High jump: 1.98 m (Rio de Janeiro 2016); Indoors; Pentathlon: 5000i NRi (Prague 2015)
Medal record
Women's athletics
Representing Great Britain
Olympic Games
Silver medal – second place	2024 Paris	Heptathlon
World Championships
Gold medal – first place	2019 Doha	Heptathlon
Gold medal – first place	2023 Budapest	Heptathlon
Bronze medal – third place	2025 Tokyo	Heptathlon
World Indoor Championships
Gold medal – first place	2018 Birmingham	Pentathlon
Silver medal – second place	2014 Sopot	Long jump
European Championships
Silver medal – second place	2018 Berlin	Heptathlon
European Indoor Championships
Gold medal – first place	2015 Prague	Pentathlon
Gold medal – first place	2019 Glasgow	Pentathlon
Representing England
Commonwealth Games
Gold medal – first place	2018 Gold Coast	Heptathlon
Gold medal – first place	2022 Birmingham	Heptathlon
Women's athletics (age-grade)
Representing Great Britain
European U23 Championships
Gold medal – first place	2013 Tampere	Heptathlon
World Junior Championships
Gold medal – first place	2012 Barcelona	Long jump
World Youth Championships
Gold medal – first place	2009 Brixen	Heptathlon

Katarina Mary Johnson-Thompson (born 9 January 1993) is an English athlete. A multi-eventer, she is primarily known as both a heptathlete and an indoor pentathlete. In the heptathlon she is a double world champion, double Commonwealth Games champion and an Olympic and European silver medallist. In the indoor pentathlon, she is a world and double European champion.

Representing Great Britain, Johnson-Thompson won the heptathlon gold medal at the 2019 World Championships, breaking the British record with a score of 6,981 points which ranks her at No. 7 on the all-time lists. She won her second world heptathlon title at the 2023 World Championships, and won bronze in the event at the 2025 World Championships. Her other heptathlon results include finishing 13th at the 2012 London Olympics, fifth at the 2013 World Championships, sixth at the 2016 Rio Olympics and fifth at the 2017 World Championships. She won the gold medal in the event at the 2018 Commonwealth Games before claiming silver at the 2018 European Championships. She retained her title at the 2022 Commonwealth Games. She also holds the British indoor pentathlon record of 5,000 points and won gold in that event at the 2018 World Indoor Championships, as well as the 2015 and 2019 European Indoor Championships.

Johnson-Thompson's career has largely coincided with those of two greats of the sport; fellow British athlete, Olympic and triple World champion Jessica Ennis-Hill and Belgium's triple Olympic and double World champion, Nafi Thiam, with whom she has competed since junior competition. Johnson-Thompson was the only athlete to have defeated Thiam face to face in global competition since Thiam won Olympic gold in 2016 until Thiam withdrew during the 2025 World Championships, and while Thiam has dominated the rivalry, particularly at the Olympic Games, the two are considered the dominant multi-eventers of their era, with the era defined by their rivalry. No athlete beside the pair won a global outdoor gold medal in the heptathlon between 2015 and 2024.

Johnson-Thompson has also occasionally represented Great Britain in her two strongest individual disciplines: the high jump and long jump. She previously held the British high jump outdoor record, until Morgan Lake became the 1st British woman to clear 2m, and in the long jump, she was the 2012 World Junior champion and the 2014 World Indoor silver medalist.

== Early life ==
Johnson-Thompson was born in the Woolton suburb of Liverpool on 9 January 1993, the daughter of English mother Tracey Johnson and Bahamian father Ricardo Thompson. Her mother is a former dancer, while her father worked as a production assistant for the Bahamian television station ZNS-TV.

She spent the first year of her life in Nassau with her father after her parents separated, then returned to the United Kingdom to live with her mother in the town of Halewood near Liverpool, where she attended St Mark's Catholic Primary School and became interested in athletics. She later moved with her mother back to Woolton, where she attended St Julie's Catholic High School and became close friends with future actress Jodie Comer, before she started studying sports science at Liverpool John Moores University, which she left after 21 days to concentrate on her sports.

== Career ==
=== Youth career ===
Johnson-Thompson represents Liverpool Harriers, which is based in Liverpool's Wavertree district, and was formerly coached by Mike Holmes. Her development was in part funded by the Wells Sports Foundation set up by Barrie Wells, which gave her access to the foundation's patron, Jessica Ennis (now Dame Jessica Ennis-Hill).

At the 2009 World Youth Championships in Athletics in Brixen, Italy, she won the gold medal in the heptathlon. She missed most of the 2010 athletics season suffering from patellar tendinopathy, also known as jumper's knee.

Johnson-Thompson broke Jessica Ennis' British junior record at the Multistars competition held in Desenzano del Garda, Italy in May 2012. Her score of 6007 points was enough to take third position at the event behind Sofía Ifadídou of Greece and French athlete Blandine Maisonnier. The score also meant she had surpassed the 'B' qualifying standard for the 2012 Olympics, however it fell short of the 6,150 points 'A' standard. In June, Johnson-Thompson achieved the 'A' qualifying standard for the Games by scoring a new personal best of 6,248 points at the TNT – Fortuna Meeting held in Kladno, Czech Republic. At the meeting she set six new personal bests across the seven events to beat her previous best score by 241 points.

At the 2012 World Junior Championships in Athletics held in Barcelona, Johnson-Thompson chose not to compete in the full heptathlon competition to save herself for the Olympics; instead she took part in the long jump—winning a gold medal with a jump of 6.81 metres—and the 100 metres hurdles.

=== London Olympics and first World Championships ===
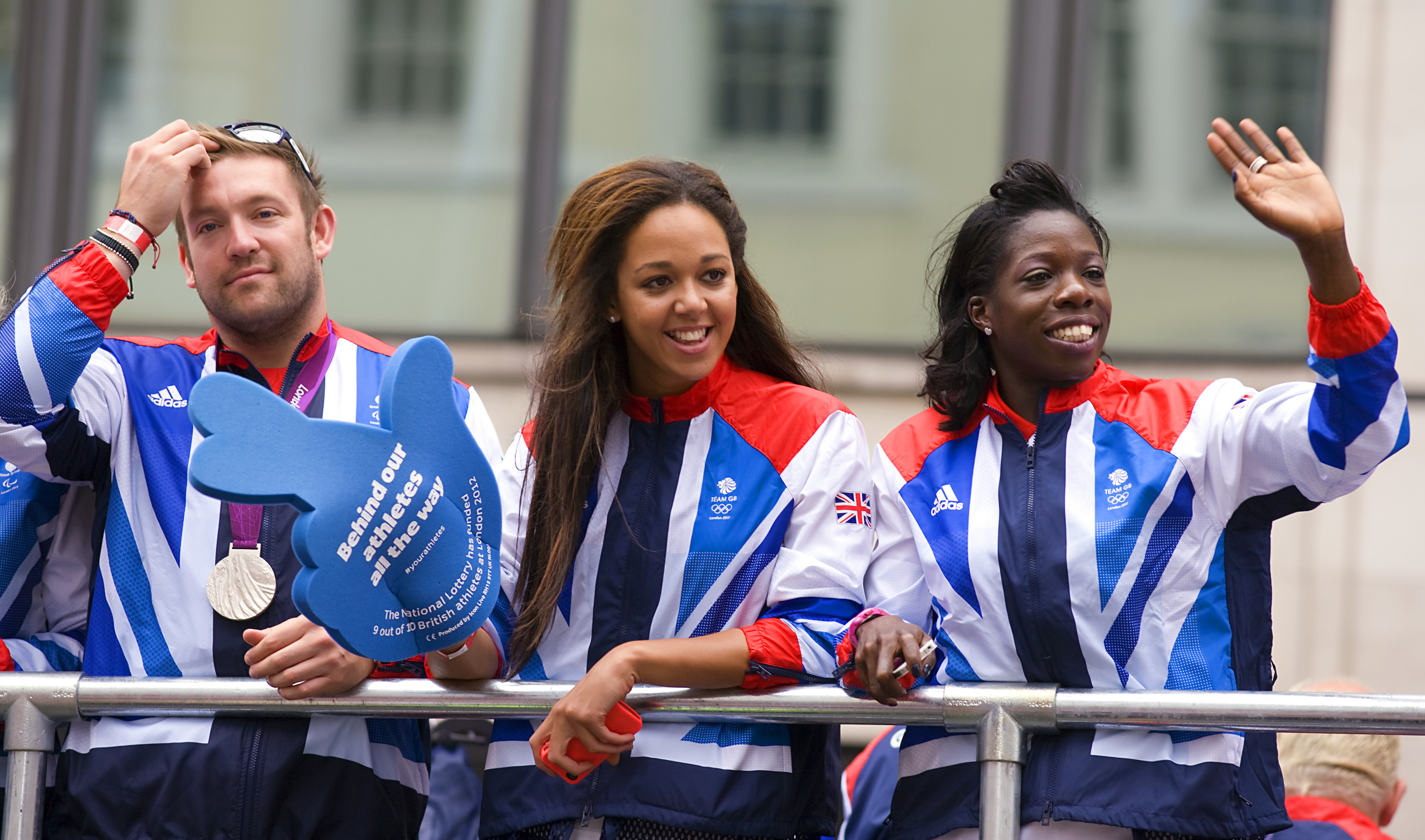
Johnson-Thompson (C) at the 2012 London Olympic Victory Parade.

Johnson-Thompson competed for Great Britain at the 2012 Summer Olympics in the women's heptathlon alongside compatriots Jessica Ennis and Louise Hazel at the Olympic Stadium on 3–4 August 2012. She finished in 13th place with a score of 6267.

In September, Johnson-Thompson was nominated for the "European Athletics Rising Star award". In October, she won the "Lillian Board Memorial Award" (for junior women) at the 2012 British Athletics Writers' Association Awards.

In the 2013 IAAF World Championships heptathlon, Johnson-Thompson finished in 5th place. After a first day which left her in 5th place, with a PB in the 200 m, she had an excellent second day with PB's in the long jump, javelin and the 800 m. However, she admitted afterwards that she wished she had set her target of finishing in the Top 8 with more ambition, having finished just 28 points away from bronze medallist Dafne Schippers.

=== First World Indoor and European medals ===
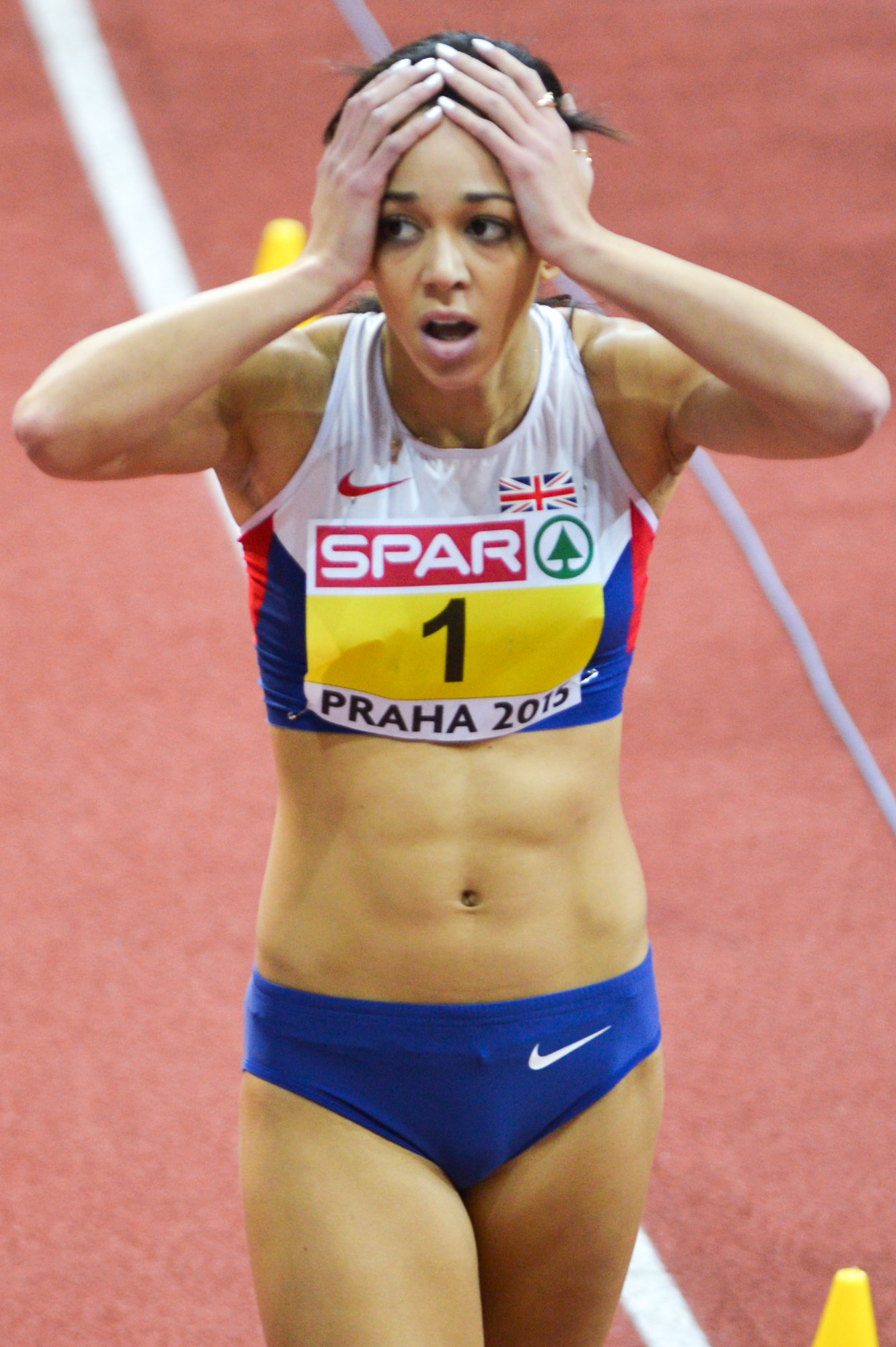
Johnson-Thompson won the pentathlon at the 2015 European Indoor Championships in Prague, becoming only the second woman to achieve 5,000 points or more in the event.

On 11 July 2014, Johnson-Thompson set a new long jump personal best of 6.92 m at the Glasgow Diamond League meeting, taking her to number 2 on the British all-time list for the event. She won gold at the 2014 edition of the prestigious heptathlon Hypo-Meeting in Götzis with a world leading personal best score of 6682 but missed the Glasgow Commonwealth Games and the European Championships after suffering a foot injury.

Johnson-Thompson set a new British high jump record with a height of 1.97 metres at the British Indoor Championships in Sheffield on 14 February 2015, surpassing her previous record of 1.96 metres set on 8 February 2014. Prior to Johnson-Thompson, Debbie Marti's 1.95-metre jump had held the record since 1997. On 21 February, she set a new British indoor long jump record with a distance of 6.93 m at the Birmingham Indoor Grand Prix.

In August 2015, Johnson-Thompson finished in 28th place in the heptathlon at the 2015 World Championships in Beijing after three foul jumps in the long jump. She had been lying in second place to Jessica Ennis-Hill after the first day of events.

Johnson-Thompson competed at the 2016 Hypo-Meeting in May of that year, her first major competition since undergoing knee surgery in the autumn of 2015: she finished the competition in sixth with a score of 6,304 points, securing her place at the 2016 Rio Olympics by beating the qualifying standard of 6,200 points.

She missed out on a medal at the Games, taking sixth in the heptathlon, although her performance in the heptathlon high jump of 1.98 m set a new British high jump record and would have been good enough to take gold in the stand-alone Olympic high jump competition.

In September 2016, UK Athletics confirmed that Johnson-Thompson had split with coach Mike Holmes, having been trained by him since 2008.

She subsequently moved to Montpellier, France, to be coached by a team led by Bertrand Valcin, joining a training group including Olympic decathlon medalist Kevin Mayer and double European heptathlon champion Antoinette Nana Djimou.

On 5–6 August 2017, Johnson-Thompson competed in the heptathlon at the 2017 World Championships in Athletics held in London. After moving to Montpellier, she was expected to land a podium position but was not able to surpass the 1.86 barrier in the heptathlon's high jump, with a successful jump at 1.80 m, which gave her 978 points. In a post heptathlon Day 1 interview, she stated: "High jump is one of my best events, I lost 200 points in just one event so that's massive. I'm massively disappointed but I'm trying to move on. In Day 2, long jump is one of my good events so hopefully I can do well there". Johnson-Thompson finished in 5th place with 6558 points. She also competed in the single high jump event, finishing fifth with a season's best jump at 1.95 m.

=== World and Commonwealth titles and Olympic medal ===
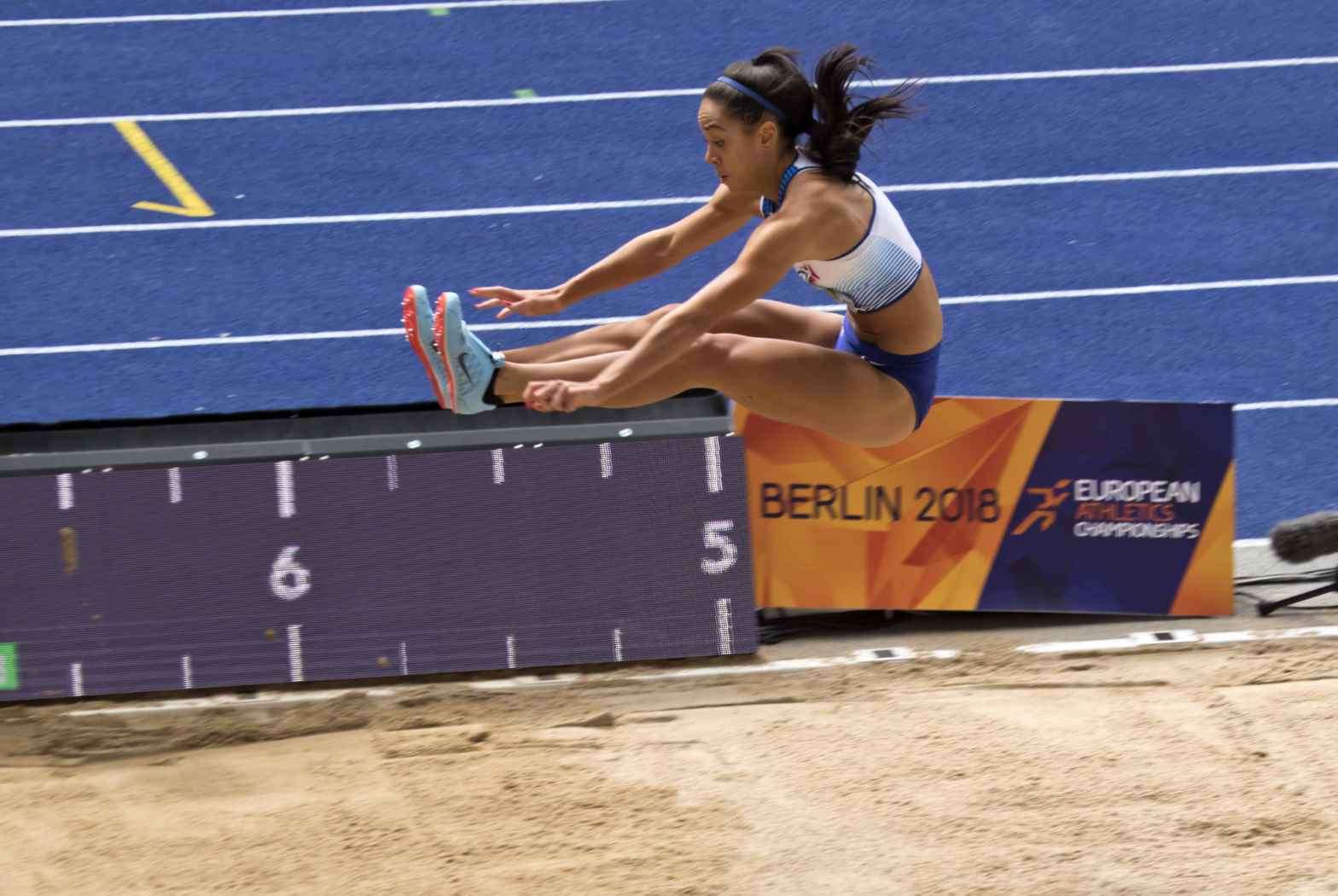
Johnson-Thompson competes in the long jump event at the 2018 European Championships in Berlin.

In 2018, Johnson-Thompson won the World indoor pentathlon and the Commonwealth Games heptathlon titles, before going on to win a silver medal behind World and Olympic champion Nafi Thiam in the heptathlon at the European Championships, recording a personal best score of 6759 points, to move into the world all-time Top 25.

In May 2019, at the 45th Hypomeeting in Götzis, Johnson-Thompson recorded a new personal best of 6,813 in the heptathlon, taking her up to 18th on the world all-time list.

She won gold in the heptathlon at the 2019 World Athletics Championships in Doha, Qatar with a British record of 6981 points.

In 2020 a ruptured Achilles tendon threatened to disrupt her preparation for the tournament, which she came close to missing entirely. In fifth place after the first three events (including her favoured high jump), she suffered a tear in her calf muscle during the 200m and fell. She got up and raced to the end only to be disqualified on the technicality of having stepped out of her lane, and was unable to compete in the remaining events.

Johnson-Thompson competed at the 2022 World Championships; finishing eighth. won the heptathlon at the 2022 Commonwealth Games in Birmingham, England.

Johnson-Thompson won gold again in the heptathlon at the 2023 World Athletics Championships in Budapest, her second World Champion title.

In 2024, Johnson-Thompson competed at the European Championships, however she withdrew due to injury before the 200 m. At the 2024 Summer Olympics in Paris, she obtained a silver medal, her first Olympic medal, coming a close second to Nafissatou Thiam. Her performance included personal bests in the shot put and 800 m.

The following year at the 2025 World Championships, in Tokyo she tied for bronze with Taliyah Brooks.

=== Media career ===
Johnson-Thompson starred in adverts for dairy brand Müller between 2019 and 2021. Since 2023, she has been one of several British Olympians and Paralympians to feature in adverts for British Gas.

In 2026, Johnson-Thompson was the subject of an episode of the BBC family history television series Who Do You Think You Are?

== Personal life ==
Since 2016, Johnson-Thompson has divided her time between her native Liverpool and the French city of Montpellier. She began dating fellow athlete Andrew Pozzi in 2018.

She is a lifelong fan of her hometown football team Liverpool FC.

== Statistics ==
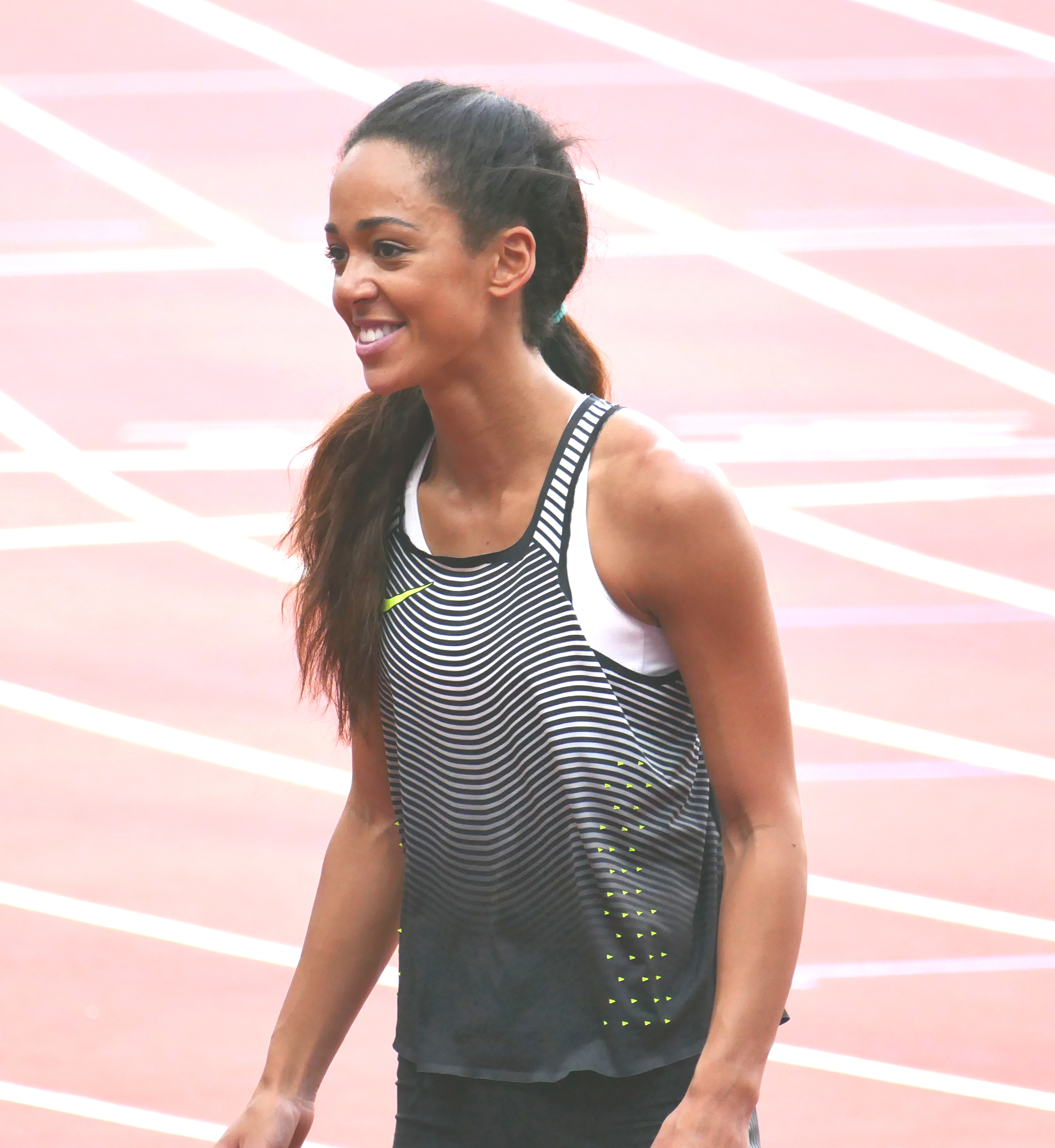
Katarina Johnson-Thompson at the Anniversary Games in London, July 2016.

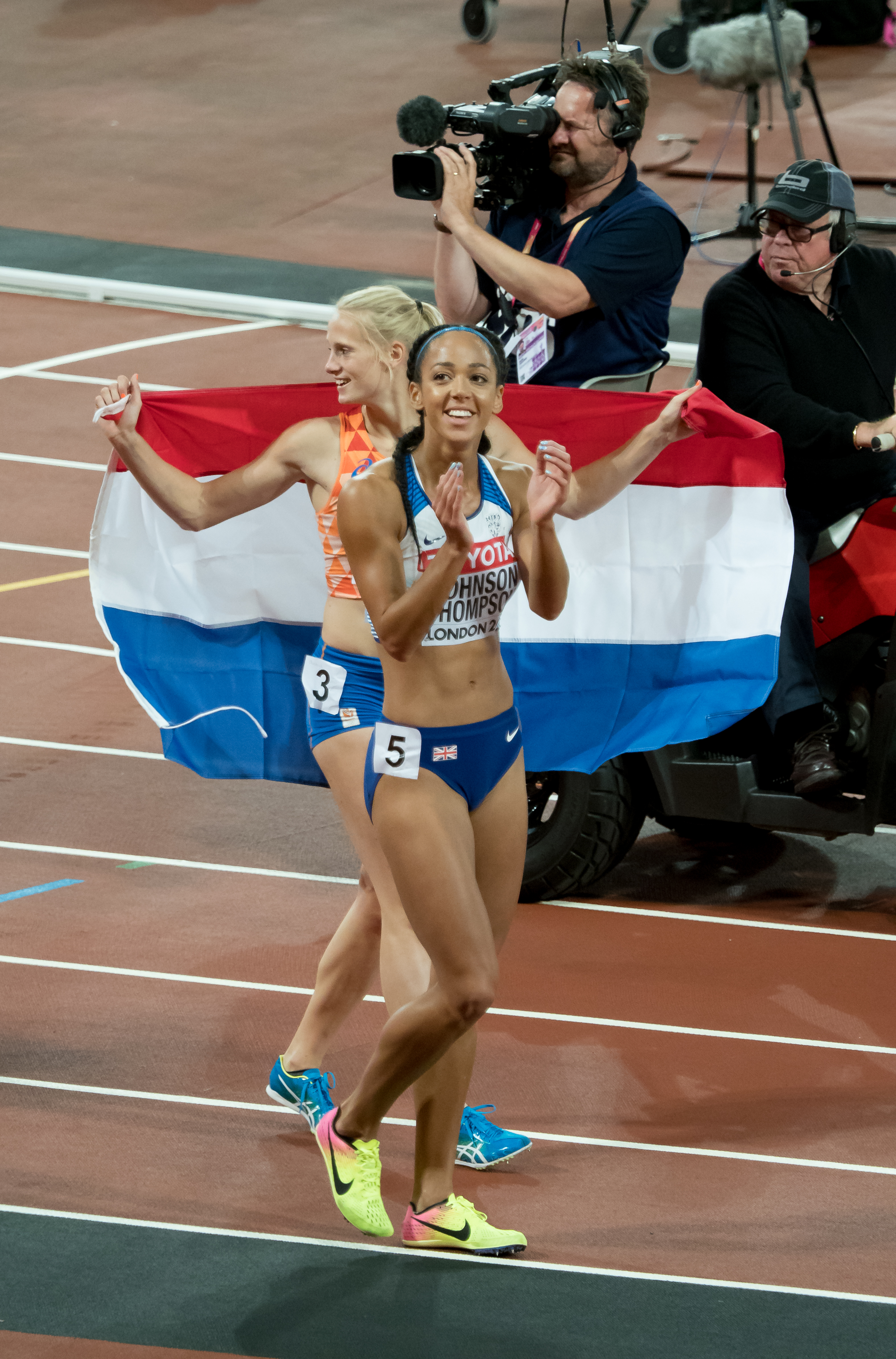
Johnson-Thompson (R) with Anouk Vetter at the 2017 World Championships held in London.

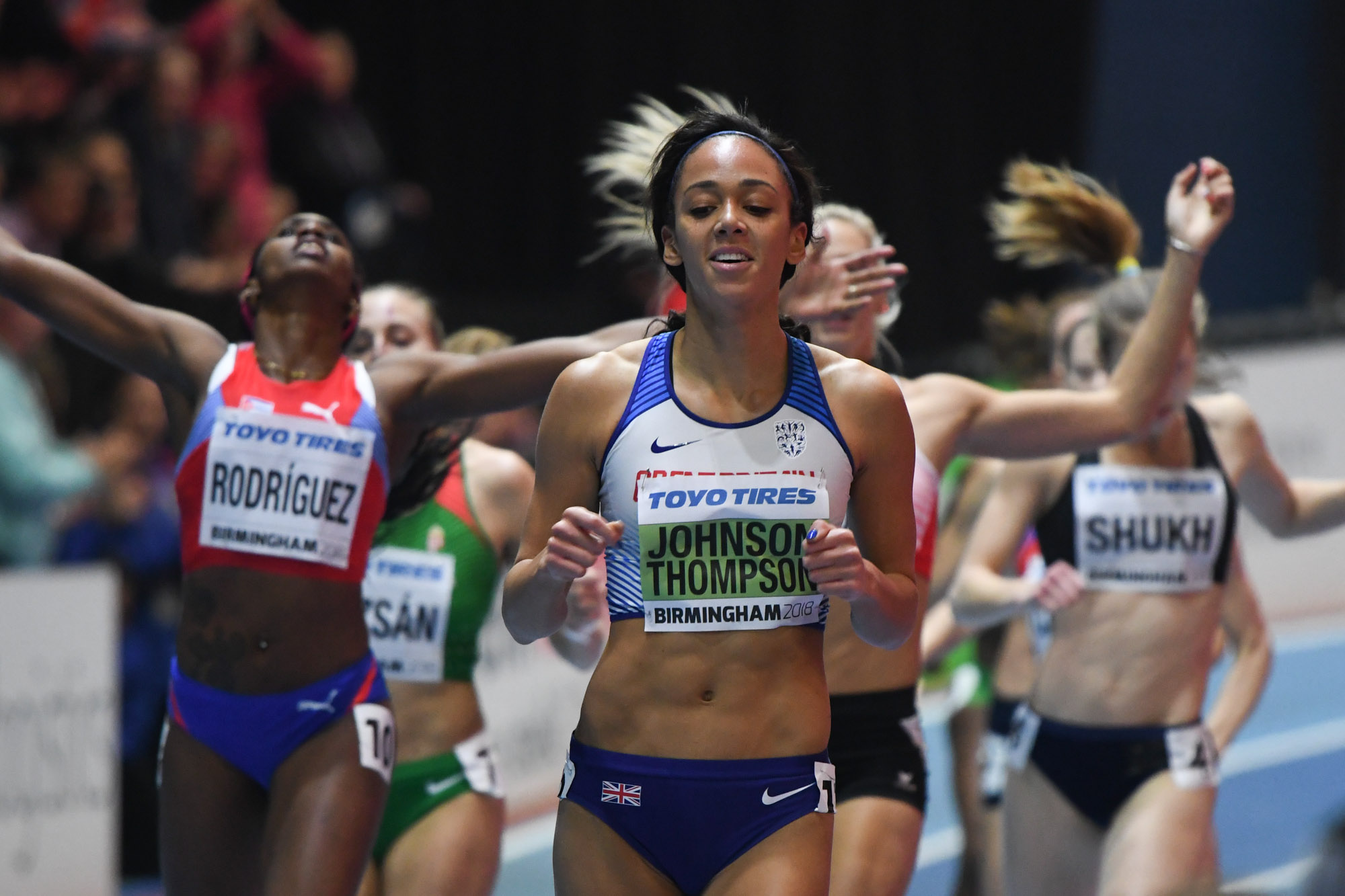
Johnson-Thompson won the 800 m run to claim the pentathlon title at the 2018 World Indoor Championships in Birmingham.

All information from World Athletics profile.

=== Personal bests ===
Outdoor
Event	Record	Points	Meeting	Venue	Date	Notes
100 m hurdles	13.09	1111	2019 World Championships	Doha, Qatar	2 October 2019	
High jump	1.98 m	1211	2016 Olympic Games	Rio de Janeiro, Brazil	12 August 2016	
Shot put	14.44 m	823	2024 Olympic Games	Paris, France	8 August 2024	
200 metres	22.79	1100	2016 Hypo-Meeting	Götzis, Austria	28 May 2016	
Long jump	6.92 m	1145	2014 Glasgow Grand Prix	Glasgow, United Kingdom	11 July 2014	
Javelin	46.14 m	785	2023 World Championships	Budapest, Hungary	20 August 2023	
800 metres	2:04.90	1041	2024 Olympic Games	Paris, France	9 August 2024	
Heptathlon	6981 pts	PB total: 7216	2019 World Championships	Doha, Qatar	4 October 2019	NR, 6th of all time

Indoor
Event	Record	Points	Meeting	Venue	Date	Notes
60 m hurdles	8.18	1088	2015 European Indoor Championships	Prague, Czech Republic	6 March 2015	
High jump	1.97 m	1198	2015 British Indoor Championships	Sheffield, United Kingdom	14 February 2015	
Shot put	13.15 m	737	2019 European Indoor Championships	Glasgow, United Kingdom	1 March 2019	
Long jump	6.93 m	1149	2015 Birmingham Indoor Grand Prix	Birmingham, United Kingdom	21 February 2015	
800 metres	2:09.13	977	2019 European Indoor Championships	Glasgow, United Kingdom	1 March 2019	
Pentathlon	5000 pts	PB total: 5149	2015 European Indoor Championships	Prague, Czech Republic	6 March 2015	NRi, 5th of all time
60 metres	7.50	—N/a	2014 Northern U17/U20/Senior Championships	Sheffield, United Kingdom	18 January 2014	

=== International competitions ===
Representing Great Britain / England
Year	Competition	Venue	Position	Event	Result
2009	World Youth Championships	Brixen, Italy	1st	Heptathlon	5750 pts
2009	European Junior Championships	Novi Sad, Serbia	8th	Heptathlon	5375 pts
2011	European Junior Championships	Tallinn, Estonia	6th	Heptathlon	5787 pts
2012	World Junior Championships	Barcelona, Spain	1st	Long jump	6.81 m
2012	Olympic Games	London, United Kingdom	13th	Heptathlon	6267 pts
2013	European U23 Championships	Tampere, Finland	1st	Heptathlon	6215 pts
2013	World Championships	Moscow, Russia	5th	Heptathlon	6449 pts
2014	World Indoor Championships	Sopot, Poland	2nd	Long jump	6.81 m
2015	European Indoor Championships	Prague, Czech Republic	1st	Pentathlon	5000 pts
2015	World Championships	Beijing, China	28th	Heptathlon	5039 pts
2015	World Championships	Beijing, China	11th	Long jump	6.63 m
2016	Olympic Games	Rio de Janeiro, Brazil	6th	Heptathlon	6523 pts
2017	World Championships	London, United Kingdom	5th	High jump	1.95 m
2017	World Championships	London, United Kingdom	5th	Heptathlon	6558 pts
2018	World Indoor Championships	Birmingham, United Kingdom	1st	Pentathlon	4750 pts
2018	Commonwealth Games	Gold Coast, Australia	1st	Heptathlon	6255 pts
2018	European Championships	Berlin, Germany	2nd	Heptathlon	6759 pts
2019	European Indoor Championships	Glasgow, United Kingdom	1st	Pentathlon	4983 pts
2019	World Championships	Doha, Qatar	1st	Heptathlon	6981 pts NR
2021	Olympic Games	Tokyo, Japan	–	Heptathlon	DNF
2022	World Indoor Championships	Belgrade, Serbia	–	Pentathlon	DNF
2022	World Championships	Eugene, United States	8th	Heptathlon	6222 pts
2022	Commonwealth Games	Birmingham, England	1st	Heptathlon	6377 pts
2023	World Championships	Budapest, Hungary	1st	Heptathlon	6740 pts
2024	European Championships	Rome, Italy	–	Heptathlon	DNF
2024	Olympic Games	Paris, France	2nd	Heptathlon	6844 pts
2025	World Championships	Tokyo, Japan	3rd	Heptathlon	6581 pts
2026	European Championships	Birmingham, United Kingdom	21st	Heptathlon	5790 pts

==== Detailed heptathlon scores ====
Key: Lifetime best

Competition	100 m hurdles	High jump	Shot put	200 metres	Long jump	Javelin throw	800 metres	Heptathlon	Notes
2012 Olympic Games	13.48 s =PB	1.89 m PB	11.32 m	23.73 s PB	6.19 m	38.37 m	2:10.76 min PB	6267 pts	NJR
2013 World Championships	13.49 s	1.83 m	11.52 m	23.37 s PB	6.56 m PB	40.86 m PB	2:07.64 min PB	6449 pts	PB
2014 Glasgow Grand Prix	—N/a				6.92 m	—N/a			
2015 World Championships	13.37 s PB	1.89 m =PB	12.47 m PB	23.08 s	NM	39.52 m	2:50.73 min	5039 pts	SB
2016 Hypo-Meeting	13.37 s =PB	1.92 m PB	11.55 m	22.79 s	6.17 m	36.66 m	2:16.81 min	6304 pts	
2016 Olympic Games	13.48 s	1.98 m NR	11.68 m	23.26 s	6.51 m	36.36 m	2:10.47 min	6523 pts	SB
2017 World Championships	13.33 s	1.80 m	12.47 m	22.86 s	6.56 m	41.72 m	2:08.10 min	6558 pts	
2018 Commonwealth Games	13.54 s	1.87 m	11.54 m	23.56 s	6.50 m	40.46 m	2:21.24 min	6255 pts	
2018 European Championships	13.34 s	1.91 m	13.09 m	22.88 s	6.68 m	42.16 m PB	2:09.84 min	6759 pts	PB
2019 World Championships	13.09 s	1.95 m	13.86 m	23.08 s	6.77 m	43.93 m PB	2:07.26 min	6981 pts	WL NR
2021 Olympic Games	13.27 s	1.86 m	13.31 m	DQ	DNS	DNS	DNS	DNF	
2022 World Championships	13.55 s	1.83 m	12.92 m	23.62 s	6.28 m	39.18 m	2:19.16 min	6222 pts	SB
2022 Commonwealth Games	13.83 s	1.84 m	12.94 m	23.70 s	6.33 m	44.33 m	2:13.93 min	6377 pts	SB
2023 Hypo-Meeting	13.88 s	1.89 m	13.92 m	23.26 s	6.32 m	44.14 m	2:12.40 min	6556 pts	
2023 World Championships	13.50 s	1.86 m	13.64 m	23.48 s	6.54 m	46.14 m	2:05.63 min	6740 pts	SB
2024 European Championships	13.66 s	1.83 m	12.44 m	DNS	DNS	DNS	DNS	DNF	
2024 Olympic Games	13.40 s	1.92 m	14.44 m	23.44 s	6.40 m	45.49 m	2:04.90 min	6844 pts	SB
2025 World Championships	13.44 s	1.86 m	13.37 m	23.51 s	6.42 m	41.91 m	2:07.38 min	6581 pts	SB
2026 European Championships	14.00 s	1.83 m	12.79 m	24.46 s	5.77 m	36.92 m	2:24.92 min	5790 pts	SB

=== National titles ===
- British Athletics Championships
  - Long jump: 2014
- British Indoor Athletics Championships
  - Long jump: 2014, 2018, 2019
  - High jump: 2014, 2015

== Awards and honours ==
- British Athletics Writers' Association: 2019 Cliff Temple Award for Female Athlete of the Year
- Sports Journalists' Association: 2023 Committee Award
- Laureus World Sports Award for Comeback of the Year: Nominee 2024
- MBE for contribution to athletics in the 2025 New Year Honours

== See also ==
- List of World Athletics Championships medalists (women)
- List of IAAF World Indoor Championships medalists (women)
- List of Commonwealth Games medallists in athletics (women)
- List of European Athletics Championships medalists (women)
- List of European Athletics Indoor Championships medalists (women)
- Great Britain and Northern Ireland at the World Athletics Championships
- List of Commonwealth records in athletics
- List of English records in athletics
- List of people from Merseyside
