= 2013 European Athletics U23 Championships – Women's heptathlon =

The Women's heptathlon event at the 2013 European Athletics U23 Championships was held in Tampere, Finland, at Ratina Stadium on 13 and 14 July.

== Medalists ==
Gold	Katarina Johnson-Thompson; United Kingdom
Silver	Kira Biesenbach; Germany
Bronze	Anastasiya Mokhnyuk; Ukraine

== Results ==
=== Final ===
14 July 2013

Rank	Name	Nationality	Points	Notes
1st place, gold medalist(s)	Katarina Johnson-Thompson	United Kingdom	6215	
2nd place, silver medalist(s)	Kira Biesenbach	Germany	5946	
3rd place, bronze medalist(s)	Anastasiya Mokhnyuk	Ukraine	5898	
4	Lisa Linnell	Sweden	5888	PB
5	Ivona Dadic	Austria	5874	
6	Carolin Schäfer	Germany	5809	
7	Xénia Krizsán	Hungary	5770	
8	Laura Arteil	France	5703	PB
9	Rokhaya Mbaye	France	5636	PB
10	Alina Biesenbach	Germany	5506	
11	Lucija Cvitanović	Croatia	5504	
12	Tanja Mayer	Switzerland	5452	SB
13	Michelle Zeltner	Switzerland	5443	PB
14	Sveinbjörg Zophoníasdóttir	Iceland	5435	
15	Tiina Säily	Finland	5386	PB
16	Sandra Jacmaire	France	5320	PB
17	Alena Galertová	Czech Republic	5263	
	Anouk Vetter	Netherlands	DNF	
	María Rún Gunnlaugsdóttir	Iceland	DNF	

== Participation ==
According to an unofficial count, 19 athletes from 13 countries participated in the event.

- Austria (1)
- Croatia (1)
- Czech Republic (1)
- Finland (1)
- France (3)
- Germany (3)
- Hungary (1)
- Iceland (2)
- Netherlands (1)
- Sweden (1)
- Switzerland (2)
- Ukraine (1)
- United Kingdom (1)
