= Barrie Wells =

English businessman

Barrie John Wells MBE is an English financial services entrepreneur and businessperson, who has set up and sold two major insurance-related businesses in his career. In 2008, so inspired by the 2008 Summer Olympics in Beijing, Wells donated £2 million to a sports athletics fund to sponsor future British athletes. He is also the founder of an initiative to provide seriously ill children with VIP experiences at sporting and entertainment events.

== Biography ==
The grandson of former World Pole Vault record holder Ernest Latimer Stones, Wells was born and raised in Liverpool and educated at Merchant Taylors' School, Crosby.

Wells set up direct home and motor insurance operation Prospero Direct, which after its sale became Axa Direct. He then setup Premierline Direct, the UK's first direct commercial insurance operation which he founded with his business partner, Philippa Rothwell; this was then sold to Allianz in 2006. Wells was also a non-executive director of Marks & Spencer Money for ten years.

A keen amateur 400m runner, Wells has travelled to every Olympic Games since 1972. He has had a box at Liverpool F.C.'s Anfield ground since 2010, which he donates for the use of seriously ill and disabled children. Wells was made an Honorary Doctor of Business Administration by Edge Hill University in 2014 and is also an Honorary Teaching Fellow at Lancaster University. He is a Patron of Alder Hey Children's Charity. In 2016 Wells was awarded the Points of Light accolade by the Prime Minister in recognition of his exceptional philanthropic work. In 2022, he also received the Chairman's Award at the British Sports Journalists' Association Awards for his contribution to British sport.

Wells currently actively manages a portfolio of private equity and property investments alongside his role as Chairman and sole funder of the Barrie Wells Trust.

== Barrie Wells Trust ==
After being inspired by a visit to the 2008 Beijing Olympics, Wells set up the Wells Sports Foundation, which was rebranded in 2015 as the Barrie Wells Trust.

Wells personally funded 18 athletes in the buildup to the 2012 Olympics. He helped to make a real difference to their preparations for international sporting competitions, and experienced being part of each of the athletes' individual journeys. The first athlete sponsored was Liverpool heptathlete Katarina Johnson-Thompson.

Wells also created 'Athletes4Schools,' which ran from 2009 up until the London 2012 Olympics, inspiring over 35,000 children. This initiative involved many of the 18 elite athletes personally funded by Wells, visiting schools in various parts of the UK to deliver free, fun and educational workshops. The charity also supported sports clubs and schools with grants of up to £2,000 to fund initiatives that increased participation in sport. This also ended in 2012.

In 2010 Wells launched his Box4Kids initiative. Box4Kids provides once in a lifetime opportunities for seriously ill children to enjoy VIP days at major sporting and entertainment events across the UK from the luxury of executive boxes. Box4Kids initially started when Wells purchased a box at Liverpool Football Club and it has since been used solely for Box4Kids. This was so successful that Wells then approached individuals and organisations across the UK to ask for donations of boxes each year. Box4Kids now operates in 150 major venues across the UK, embracing 13 different sports and every entertainment arena in the country. Box4Kids is also the charity partner of the Jockey Club and Farnborough Airshow. With a network of 269 companies and connections with 181 different hospitals, hospices and charities across the UK, Box4Kids has benefited over 19,000 seriously ill and disabled children and their family members. Box4Kids has also started to expand overseas starting with the Singapore and Farnborough International Airshows.

Wells was appointed Member of the Order of the British Empire (MBE) in the 2020 New Year Honours for services to seriously ill children.

=== Sponsored athletes and programmes ===
- Heptathlon: Jessica Ennis-Hill, Katarina Johnson-Thompson "(Patron)"
- Modern pentathlon: Sam Weale, Freyja Prentice
- Track & Field: Holly Bleasdale, Dai Greene, Jenny Meadows, Michael Rimmer, Matty Shirling, Stephanie Twell, Jodie Williams, Keely Hodgkinson
- Swimming: Anne Bochmann, Caitlin McClatchey, Hannah Miley, Lizzie Simmonds, Liam Tancock
- Gymnastics: Beth Tweddle
- Triathlon: Adam Bowden, Mark Buckingham, Matthew Gunby, Katie Hewison, Emma Pallant
- British Triathlon's new talent identification programme, trigold, presently covering: Adam Bowden, Charlotte Roach and Katie Ingram
