= Premierline =

UK-based commercial insurance broker

Premierline (Premierline Business Insurance Broker) is a UK based commercial insurance broker based in Lancaster, Lancashire. The company offers a broker service for UK businesses. The commercial broker packages insurance products to sectors including retailers, pubs, restaurants, hotels and property owners.

== History ==
Premierline Direct was the UK’s first direct commercial insurance operation offering business insurance to UK companies. The firm was originally founded by insurance entrepreneur, Barrie Wells alongside his business partner, Philippa Rothwell in 2001.

The business was then sold to Allianz in 2006. Shortly after the acquisition, Premierline announced it would be quadrupling its marketing spend to £8m ahead of "aggressive" expansion plans in the UK.

Allianz previously owned a 20% stake in the business and replaced Zenith Insurance Company as the main underwriter in 2003. Following the acquisition by Allianz, the organisation saw the launch of two new brands within the business-to-business insurance market.

Allianz Business Services Limited (ABSL) was formed as a parent company unifying these two new brands, Premierline Direct and Cornhill Direct Business. In 2014, Willis BusinessCare sold its BusinessCare company located in Preston, which focuses on micro and small enterprises, to Allianz.

Following this acquisition, the company transacted new business under the brand of Premier BusinessCare as well as servicing its original customers under the retained trading name of Premierline. In 2019 it consolidated the brands to Premierline Business Insurance Broker, or Premierline for short.

== Charity ==
As part of the Allianz Group, Premierline organises and participates in a range of fundraising activities on behalf of their chosen charity partner. 2019 saw the launch of a three-year partnership with mental health organisation, Mind.

Prior to this association, Allianz has supported other charitable organisations such as the Air Ambulance throughout the 2016-18 period.

Some fundraising activities run concurrently with popular contests, and are based on popular TV shows such as The Apprentice (British TV series). In 2014, Premierline hosted their own version of the hit BBC show to raise money for St John’s Hospice.
