= BAWA Athlete of the Year =

- Country: United Kingdom
- Presented by: British Athletics Writers' Association (BAWA)
- First award: 1963 (Senior); 2013 (Para)

The BAWA Athlete of the Year is an award presented by the British Athletics Writers' Association (BAWA) to the British athletes voted to have been adjudged to have been best of the year in British athletics.

They are presented each autumn at the Association's annual awards which have been running since 1963.

There are male and female award categories for senior, junior and Paralympic athletes. The most frequent winner of the main award is Mo Farah.

== Winners ==
=== Senior Awards ===
The awards began in 1963. In 2011, the senior awards were renamed in honour of two highly esteemed BAWA members, the John Rodda Award for men and the Cliff Temple Award for women.

| Year | Men | Women | Ref |
|---|---|---|---|
| 1963 | Maurice Herriott | Dorothy Hyman | |
| 1964 | Lynn Davies | Mary Rand | |
| 1965 | Maurice Herriott | Anne Smith | |
| 1966 | Lynn Davies | Pam Piercy | |
| 1967 | Lynn Davies | Lillian Board | |
| 1968 | David Hemery | Sheila Sherwood | |
| 1969 | Ian Stewart | Lillian Board | |
| 1970 | Ian Stewart | Rosemary Stirling | |
| 1971 | David Bedford | Barbara Inkpen | |
| 1972 | David Hemery | Mary Peters | |
| 1973 | Brendan Foster | Verona Bernard | |
| 1974 | Ian Thompson | Joyce Smith | |
| 1975 | Alan Pascoe | Andrea Lynch | |
| 1976 | Brendan Foster | Sonia Lannaman | |
| 1977 | Steve Ovett | Tessa Sanderson | |
| 1978 | Daley Thompson | Tessa Sanderson | |
| 1979 | Sebastian Coe | Christine Benning | |
| 1980 | Steve Ovett | Kathy Smallwood | |
| 1981 | Sebastian Coe | Kathy Smallwood | |
| 1982 | Daley Thompson | Kathy Smallwood | |
| 1983 | Steve Cram | Fatima Whitbread | |
| 1984 | Sebastian Coe | Tessa Sanderson | |
| 1985 | Steve Cram | Zola Budd | |
| 1986 | Roger Black | Fatima Whitbread | |
| 1987 | Jon Ridgeon | Fatima Whitbread | |
| 1988 | Linford Christie | Liz McColgan | |
| 1989 | Steve Backley | Yvonne Murray | |
| 1990 | Steve Backley | Yvonne Murray | |
| 1991 | Kriss Akabusi | Liz McColgan | |
| 1992 | Linford Christie | Sally Gunnell | |
| 1993 | Colin Jackson | Sally Gunnell | |
| 1994 | Linford Christie | Sally Gunnell | |
| 1995 | Jonathan Edwards | Kelly Holmes | |
| 1996 | Roger Black | Denise Lewis | |
| 1997 | Iwan Thomas | Denise Lewis | |
| 1998 | Iwan Thomas | Denise Lewis | |
| 1999 | Colin Jackson | Paula Radcliffe | |
| 2000 | Jonathan Edwards | Denise Lewis | |
| 2001 | Jonathan Edwards | Paula Radcliffe | |
| 2002 | Dwain Chambers | Paula Radcliffe | |
| 2003 | Darren Campbell | Paula Radcliffe | |
| 2004 | Olympic 4 × 100 m team (Note: The 4 x 100 metres relay quartet of Jason Gardener, Darren Campbell, Marlon Devonish and Mark Lewis-Francis that won Olympic Gold in 2004 were declared joint winners.) | Kelly Holmes | |
| 2005 | Jason Gardener | Paula Radcliffe | |
| 2006 | Mo Farah | Rebecca Lyne | |
| 2007 | Marlon Devonish | Christine Ohuruogu | |
| 2008 | Phillips Idowu | Christine Ohuruogu | |
| 2009 | Phillips Idowu | Jessica Ennis | |
| 2010 | Mo Farah | Jessica Ennis | |
| 2011 | Mo Farah | Jessica Ennis | |
| 2012 | Mo Farah | Jessica Ennis | |
| 2013 | Mo Farah | Christine Ohuruogu | |
| 2014 | Greg Rutherford | Jo Pavey | |
| 2015 | Greg Rutherford | Jessica Ennis-Hill | |
| 2016 | Mo Farah | Jessica Ennis-Hill | |
| 2017 | Mo Farah | Laura Muir | |
| 2018 | Zharnel Hughes | Dina Asher-Smith | |
| 2019 | Adam Gemili | Katarina Johnson-Thompson | |
| 2020 | Jake Wightman | Jemma Reekie | |
| 2021 | Josh Kerr | Keely Hodgkinson | |

=== Junior Awards ===
In 2011, the junior athlete awards were also renamed to the Jim Coote Memorial Award for junior men and the Lilian Board Memorial Award for junior women.

| Year | Men | Women |
|---|---|---|
| 2005 | Harry Aikines-Aryeetey | Emily Pidgeon |
| 2006 | Harry Aikines-Aryeetey | Sian Edwards |
| 2007 | Alexander Nelson | Asha Philip |
| 2008 | David Forrester | Stephanie Twell |
| 2009 | Lawrence Clarke | Jodie Williams |
| 2010 | Jack Meredith | Jodie Williams |
| 2011 | Adam Cotton | Jodie Williams |
| 2012 | Adam Gemili | Katarina Johnson-Thompson |
| 2013 | Zak Seddon | Jessica Judd |
| 2014 | David Omoregie | Dina Asher-Smith |
| 2015 | Kyle Langford | Morgan Lake |
| 2016 | Callum Wilkinson | Morgan Lake |
| 2017 | Tom Gale | Alicia Barrett |
| 2018 | Jake Norris | Niamh Emerson |
| 2019 | Max Burgin | Amy Hunt |

=== Para Awards ===
The Paralympic Athlete of the Year categories were introduced by British Athletics Writers in 2013, following the success of the 2012 Paralympic Games in London.

| Year | Men | Women |
|---|---|---|
| 2012 | David Weir (Note: There was no British Athletics Writers' Award in 2012, but David Weir won the Outstanding Achievement Award by a Paralympic Athlete, a category introduced by British Athletics Writers to mark the success of the 2012 Paralympic Games.) | |
| 2013 | Richard Whitehead | Hannah Cockroft |
| 2014 | Dan Greaves | Hannah Cockroft |
| 2015 | Aled Davies | Hannah Cockroft |
| 2016 | Jonnie Peacock | Libby Clegg |
| 2017 | Jonnie Peacock | Samantha Kinghorn |
| 2018 | Thomas Young | Sophie Hahn and Kare Adenegan |
| 2019 | Thomas Young | Sophie Hahn |

=== Other Awards ===
The Ron Pickering Award is awarded for services to athletics. Introduced in 2011, the BAWA Inspiration Award is given in recognition of an athlete who made an outstanding performance in a single event, performed well against the odds, or is retiring after a long and distinguished career.

| Year | Category | Winner |
|---|---|---|
| 2005 | Best Performance | Harry Aikines-Aryeetey |
| 2006 | Best Performance | David Weir |
| 2006 | Ron Pickering Memorial Award | David Moorcroft |
| 2007 | Best Performance | Christine Ohuruogu |
| 2007 | Ron Pickering Memorial Award | Martin Webster |
| 2008 | Best Performance | Christine Ohuruogu; David Weir (Note: Both Christine Ohuruogu and David Weir were declared joint winners in 2008, after Christine Ohuruogu won Olympic Gold in the 400 metres in 2008 and David Weir won four Paralympic medals including two Gold in 2008.) |
| 2008 | Ron Pickering Memorial Award | George Gandy |
| 2009 | Best Performance | Jessica Ennis |
| 2009 | Ron Pickering Memorial Award | Peter Matthews |
| 2010 | Ron Pickering Memorial Award | Mike Heath |
| 2011 | BAWA Inspiration Award | Helen Clitheroe |
| 2011 | Ron Pickering Memorial Award | David Bedford |
| 2012 | BAWA Inspiration Award | Yamile Aldama |
| 2012 | Ron Pickering Memorial Award | Mel Watman |
| 2013 | BAWA Inspiration Award | Asha Philip |
| 2013 | Ron Pickering Memorial Award | Lloyd Cowan |
| 2014 | BAWA Inspiration Award | Goldie Sayers |
| 2014 | Ron Pickering Memorial Award | Mark Shearman |
| 2015 | BAWA Inspiration Award | Stephanie Twell |
| 2015 | Ron Pickering Memorial Award | Stuart Storey |
| 2016 | BAWA Inspiration Award | Vikki Orvice |
| 2016 | Ron Pickering Memorial Award | Stan Greenberg |
| 2017 | BAWA Inspiration Award | Perri Shakes-Drayton |
| 2017 | Ron Pickering Memorial Award | Dame Mary Peters |
| 2018 | BAWA Inspiration Award | Anthony Whiteman |
| 2018 | Ron Pickering Memorial Award | Paul Dickenson |
| 2019 | Vikki Orvice Inspiration Award | James Ellington |
| 2019 | Ron Pickering Memorial Award | Peter Stanley |
