= 2012 World Junior Championships in Athletics – Women's long jump =

The women's long jump at the 2012 World Junior Championships in Athletics was held at the Estadi Olímpic Lluís Companys on 12 and 13 July. The event was won by British heptathlon specialist Katarina Johnson-Thompson.

== Medalists ==
Gold	Silver	Bronze
Katarina Johnson-Thompson; Great Britain	Lena Malkus; Germany	Jazmin Sawyers; Great Britain

== Records ==
Prior to the competition, the existing world junior and championship records were as follows.

World Junior Record	Heike Drechsler (GDR)	7.14 m	Bratislava, Czechoslovakia	4 June 1983
Championship Record	Fiona May (GBR)	6.88 m	Sudbury, Canada	30 July 1988
World Junior Leading	Jazmin Sawyers (GBR)	6.64 m	Birmingham, Great Britain	24 June 2012
Broken records during the 2012 World Junior Championships in Athletics
World Junior Leading	Jazmin Sawyers (GBR)	6.67	Barcelona, Spain	13 July 2012

=== Qualification ===
Qualification: Standard 6.30 m (Q) or at least best 12 qualified (q)

Rank	Group	Name	Nationality	#1	#2	#3	Result	Note
1	B	Alina Rotaru	Romania	6.58			6.58	Q
2	A	Katarina Johnson-Thompson	Great Britain	6.21	6.51		6.51	Q
3	A	Lena Malkus	Germany	6.28	6.45		6.45	Q
4	A	Paula Beatriz Álvarez	Cuba	X	5.94	6.44	6.44	Q
5	A	Jéssica Carolina dos Reis	Brazil	6.20	6.40		6.40	Q
6	B	Jazmin Sawyers	Great Britain	6.33			6.33	Q
7	A	Maryna Bekh	Ukraine	6.25	5.99	6.32	6.32	Q
8	A	Chanice Porter	Jamaica	6.30			6.30	Q
9	B	Brooke Stratton	Australia	6.07	6.08	6.26	6.26	q
10	B	Polina Yurchenko	Russia	X	6.02	6.25	6.25	q
11	A	Anastasiya Kadicheva	Russia	X	6.22	6.04	6.22	q
12	B	Anastassia Angioi	Italy	5.82	6.20	6.04	6.20	q
13	B	Kaia Soosaar	Estonia	6.16	X	X	6.16	
14	B	Malaika Mihambo	Germany	6.13	5.91	6.15	6.15	
15	B	Elise Malmberg	Sweden	6.15	6.12	6.11	6.15	PB
16	B	Pinar Aday	Turkey	5.85	5.78	6.13	6.13	
17	B	Robin Reynolds	United States	6.12	5.82	3.68	6.12	
18	A	Akela Jones	Barbados	6.07	6.09	6.08	6.09	
19	A	Margaret Gayen	Australia	5.46	6.05	6.08	6.08	
20	A	LeTristan Pledger	United States	X	5.75	6.08	6.08	
21	A	Jogailé Petrokaité	Lithuania	X	X	6.00	6.00	
22	A	Narumi Suenaga	Japan	5.98	5.79	5.78	5.98	
23	B	Andressa Fidelis	Brazil	5.86	5.94	5.94	5.94	
24	A	Anna Švecová	Czech Republic	5.79	7.11	5.88	5.88	
25	B	Bohdana Melnyk	Ukraine	5.57	5.66	5.88	5.88	
26	A	Giulia Liboá	Italy	5.78	5.56	5.74	5.78	
27	B	Zanri van der Merwe	South Africa	X	5.77	X	5.77	
28	A	Satenik Hovhannisyan	Armenia	X	5.74	X	5.74	
29	B	Ana Martín-Sacristán	Spain	X	X	5.71	5.71	
30	A	Jhoanmy Luque	Venezuela	5.70	5.67	X	5.70	
31	B	Josefina Gutiérrez	Chile	X	X	5.54	5.54	
–	B	Wunmi Ademuwagun	Nigeria					

=== Final ===
Rank	Name	Nationality	#1	#2	#3	#4	#5	#6	Result	Note
1st place, gold medalist(s)	Katarina Johnson-Thompson	Great Britain	6.57	6.56	6.81	5.39	5.05	X	6.81	
2nd place, silver medalist(s)	Lena Malkus	Germany	6.47	6.18	6.28	6.38	X	6.80	6.80	
3rd place, bronze medalist(s)	Jazmin Sawyers	Great Britain	6.67	X	X	X	X	X	6.67	WJL
4	Chanice Porter	Jamaica	6.25	6.42	6.19	6.58	6.33	6.51	6.58	NJ
5	Alina Rotaru	Romania	X	6.52	6.41	6.38	6.20	X	6.52	
6	Jéssica Carolina dos Reis	Brazil	6.51	6.01	6.45	6.46	6.23	X	6.51	
7	Brooke Stratton	Australia	X	6.34	4.90	X	6.42	X	6.42	
8	Maryna Bekh	Ukraine	6.05	X	6.35	6.24	X	6.10	6.35	
9	Polina Yurchenko	Russia	6.32	6.24	6.33				6.33	
10	Anastasiya Kadicheva	Russia	6.11	6.30	6.33				6.33	
11	Paula Beatriz Álvarez	Cuba	X	6.22	6.30				6.30	
12	Anastassia Angioi	Italy	5.95	6.08	5.95				6.08	

== Participation ==
According to an unofficial count, 31 athletes from 23 countries participated in the event.

- Armenia (1)
- Australia (2)
- Barbados (1)
- Brazil (2)
- Chile (1)
- Cuba (1)
- Czech Republic (1)
- Estonia (1)
- Germany (2)
- Italy (2)
- Jamaica (1)
- Japan (1)
- Lithuania (1)
- Romania (1)
- Russia (2)
- South Africa (1)
- Spain (1)
- Sweden (1)
- Turkey (1)
- Ukraine (2)
- United Kingdom (2)
- United States (2)
- Venezuela (1)
