= British Athletics Writers' Association =

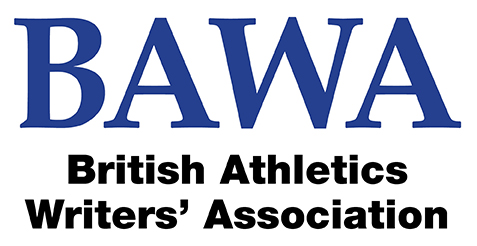
- Abbreviation: BAWA
- Formation: 1963; 63 years ago
- Legal status: 501(c)(3) nonprofit organization
- Location: London
- Coordinates: 51.5074°N 0.1278°E
- Chairman: Ben Bloom (The Daily Telegraph)
- Secretary: Jason Henderson
- Treasurer: Tony Barden
- Committee: Mark Woods, Jessica Whittington
- Website: www.bawaathletics.wordpress.com

The British Athletics Writers' Association (BAWA) is an organisation of British journalists who cover athletics. BAWA was founded in 1963 to represent the press covering the sport. It organises the BAWA Awards and is recognised by the International Association of Athletics Federations and the Sports Journalists' Association.

== Current Leadership ==
The current leadership team of BAWA for the period 2019-2020 includes:

- Chair: Ben Bloom, The Daily Telegraph
- Secretary: Jason Henderson, Athletics Weekly
- Treasurer: Tony Barden
- Committee: Mark Woods, The Scotsman; Jessica Whittington, Athletics Weekly

== Past Chairs ==
Year	Name	Employer
2017-2019	Ben Bloom	Daily Telegraph
2015-2017	Mark Woods	Daily Record
2013-2015	Simon Hart	Daily Telegraph
2011-2013	Sandy Sutherland	The Scotsman
2009-2011	Simon Turnbull	The Independent
2007-2009	Jason Henderson	Athletics Weekly
2005-2007	Jason Henderson	Athletics Weekly
2003-2005	Vikki Orvice	The Sun

== Awards Luncheon ==
The Association has held an annual luncheon to recognise achievements in the sport since 1963 and award the BAWA Athlete of the Year trophy. It has been attended by notable figures including IAAF president Sebastian Coe. The luncheon, where the winners are announced, is held in November at the Tower Hotel in London.

Previous winners of the BAWA Athlete of the Year Award have included four-time Olympic champion Mo Farah and two-time Olympic champion Dame Jessica Ennis-Hill, who have both been recognised with the trophy on numerous occasions. Former Olympic champions Greg Rutherford MBE and Jonathan Edwards CBE have also been recognised.
