= Vikki Orvice =

British sports journalist (1962–2019)

- Born: 8 November 1962; Sheffield, England
- Died: 6 February 2019 (aged 56)
- Education: University of Leicester
- Occupations: Journalist, sportswriter
- Employer: The Sun

Vikki Orvice (8 November 1962 – 6 February 2019) was a British sports journalist who was the first female football reporter on the staff of a British tabloid newspaper.

== Early life and education ==
Orvice studied English at the University of Leicester, graduating in 1984, before returning to her home city of Sheffield for postgraduate study.

== Journalism career ==
Orvice started her career as an apprentice at the Wakefield Express. After two years, she moved to the Western Daily Press, where she worked alongside doing freelance shifts for the Daily Mail and The Observer. She eventually moved to the Daily Mail full-time, working as a general news reporter, covering sport in her spare time. In 1995, she was appointed as a football reporter for The Sun and subsequently became the newspaper's athletics correspondent.

Orvice was a founding board member of Women in Football, a network of women working in football. She was also vice-chair of the Football Writers' Association and the first female chair of the British Athletics Writers' Association.

== Personal life ==
Orvice was married to fellow sports journalist Ian Ridley, who announced her death from breast cancer on 6 February 2019. She had first been diagnosed with the disease in 2007, and it returned in 2014. Knowing that her condition was terminal, Orvice continued working until the end of 2018.

== Legacy ==
After Orvice's death, The Sun announced the establishment of a sport journalism scholarship in her name. A spokesperson for the newspaper said the scholarship would be awarded to a "young woman who has all the qualities Vikki held so dearly". In November 2019, Orvice was posthumously awarded the President's Award by World Athletics. The British Athletics Writers' Association has renamed its annual Inspiration Award the Vikki Orvice Inspiration Award.
